= Blood Ties (Homicide: Life on the Street) =

- Homicide: Life on the Street episodes
- Episode nos.: Season 6 Episodes 1, 2 & 3
- Directed by: Alan Taylor (Part 1); Nick Gomez (Part 2); Mark Pellington (Part 3)
- Story by: Tom Fontana (Parts 1, 2 and 3); Julie Martin (Parts 2 and 3); James Yoshimura (Parts 2 and 3)
- Teleplay by: Anya Epstein (Parts 1 and 3); David Simon (Parts 2 and 3)
- Cinematography by: Alex Zakrzewski
- Production codes: 601, 602 & 603
- Original air dates: October 17, 1997 (Part 1); October 24, 1997 (Part 2); October 31, 1997 (Part 3)

Guest appearances
- Armando Benítez as himself; Ami Brabson as Mary Pembleton; Ellen Bethea as Thea Wilson; Robert F. Chew as Wilkie Collins; Scott Erickson as himself; Hazelle Goodman as Georgia Rae Mahoney; Željko Ivanek as Ed Danvers; Marc John Jefferies as Jack Collins; James Earl Jones as Felix Wilson; Mekhi Phifer as "Junior Bunk" Mahoney; Brian Tarantina as Scott Russell; Lynne Thigpen as Regina Wilson; Jeffrey Wright as Hal Wilson

Episode chronology
← Previous "Strangers and Other Partners"	Next → "Birthday"
- Homicide: Life on the Street season 6

"Blood Ties" is the three-episode sixth season premiere of the American police drama television series Homicide: Life on the Street. The episodes constitute the 78th, 79th and 80th overall episodes of the series. They originally aired on NBC on October 17, 24 and 31, 1997, respectively.

The teleplays were written by Anya Epstein and David Simon, based on a story by Tom Fontana, Julie Martin and James Yoshimura. Directed by Alan Taylor, Nick Gomez and Mark Pellington, "Blood Ties" marked the first appearances of Peter Gerety, Jon Seda and Callie Thorne as regular cast members, replacing outgoing cast members Melissa Leo and Max Perlich. Guest appearances were made by James Earl Jones, Jeffrey Wright, Lynne Thigpen and Mekhi Phifer.

The three episodes were tied together by the story of a murdered Haitian domestic worker employed by wealthy philanthropist Felix Wilson, played by Jones. Protagonists Frank Pembleton and Al Giardello initially refuse to properly investigate the Wilson family out of respect for their success and contributions to the African American community of Baltimore, which leads to tensions and accusations of discrimination within the police department. The storyline serves as a rumination and commentary on racism and classism, even when they come from the best of intentions.

"Blood Ties" included several additional subplots, including murder attempts made against police officers in retaliation for the fatal police shooting of drug dealer Luther Mahoney in the fifth season. The second episode involves a murder at Oriole Park at Camden Yards during a late-season baseball game. In the third episode, police investigate the execution-style slaying of a police informant. According to Nielsen ratings the first episode of "Blood Ties" was viewed by 7.94 million households, the second by 6.86 million households and the third by 6.27 million households. The episodes received generally positive reviews.

== Plot summary ==
=== Part one ===
Pembleton (Andre Braugher) and Bayliss (Kyle Secor) return to the homicide unit after a rotation in robbery, only to find the highest murder clearance rate in five years. A delighted Gee (Yaphet Kotto) credits much of the success to the new detectives Stuart Gharty (Peter Gerety) and Laura Ballard (Callie Thorne). Lewis (Clark Johnson) asks Gee for a different partner, but dodges questions about problems with his old partner Kellerman (Reed Diamond); Gee assigns him to Falsone (Jon Seda), one of the newer detectives, and Kellerman is partnered with Munch (Richard Belzer).

That evening, Gee attends a black-tie dinner honoring his friend Felix Wilson (James Earl Jones), a wealthy businessman and philanthropist. At the hotel where the event is being held, a woman is found beaten to death in the men's bathroom; Pembleton and Bayliss are called to investigate. Felix and his wife Regina (Lynne Thigpen) see the body and identify her as Melia Brierre, a Haitian expatriate working as one of their domestic workers. The Wilsons leave after only brief interviews, and Pembleton becomes agitated when Bayliss asks whether he went easy on them because of his respect for Wilson's contributions to the African-American community.

Meanwhile, a motorcyclist fires shots at the moving car of Lewis and Falsone; the two narrowly avoid injury and the motorcyclist escapes. Almost immediately afterward, the detectives are called to investigate the shooting death of a woman on a nearby street. At the scene they find Stivers (Toni Lewis), who was speaking to the woman when she was shot; police later conclude Stivers was the real target. While Munch and Kellerman are leaving the hotel, somebody opens fire on them and shoots Kellerman in the arm. Falsone suggests the shooter is targeting the detectives who were involved in the previous fatal shooting of drug dealer Luther Mahoney. Kellerman becomes angry when Falsone questions the report of Mahoney's death, which indicates Kellerman shot Mahoney to save Lewis; Falsone said autopsy reports indicate Mahoney was beaten badly.

After questioning several of Mahoney's former associates, drug supplier Wilkie Collins (Robert F. Chew) is pressured into telling Lewis and Falsone the shooter was Mahoney's nephew, Junior Bunk (Mekhi Phifer). They arrest Junior Bunk and find the matching gun, a Desert Eagle pistol, prompting Bunk to admit he shot at the police to "send a message" from his mother, Georgia Rae Mahoney (Hazelle Goodman), over the death of her brother, Luther. Georgia is arrested trying to flee in a jet to the Cayman Islands, where she used to handle Luther's drug money.

Meanwhile, following Brierre's autopsy, Cox (Michelle Forbes) finds somebody had consensual sex with the victim before her death. Pembleton and Bayliss learn from Felix's daughter Thea (Ellen Bethea) that Brierre had a vicious and abusive ex-boyfriend named Kaja. Pembleton and Gee declare Kaja the prime suspect, despite protests from Ballard that the lead is thin and that they have not properly questioned Felix. The episode ends with an imprisoned Georgia Rae Mahoney stating Kellerman will hear from her soon.

=== Part two ===
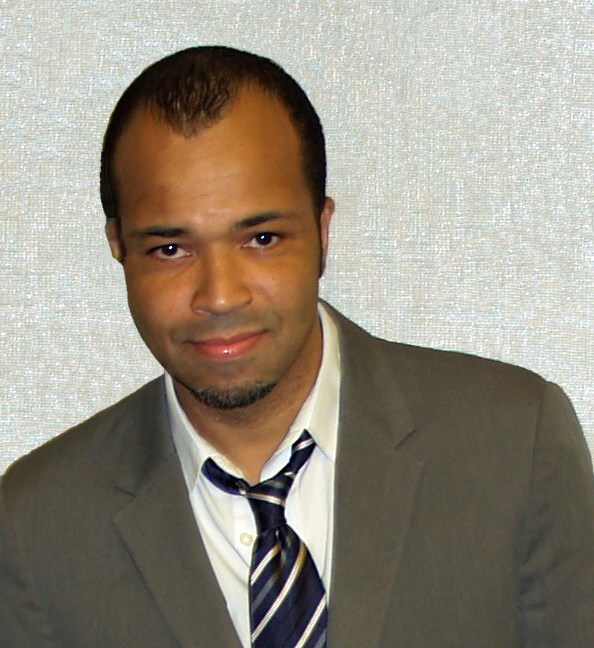
Jeffrey Wright appeared in all three "Blood Ties" episodes as Hal Wilson, a suspect in the murder of Melia Brierre.

Two days after Brierre's death, the detectives have made little progress in investigating Kaja, the victim's abusive ex-boyfriend. Ballard and Gharty suggest they look more closely at Felix and his son, Hal (Jeffrey Wright), because Brierre had sex before her death and knew few men socially besides them. Pembleton and Gee, who are both very respectful of Felix's contributions to the black community, dismiss the suggestion. The Baltimore Sun runs a story the next day about the investigation, which Pembleton believes was leaked by Gee in order to distance the Wilsons from the crime. Ballard and Gharty question Hal, who denies having sex with Brierre. After the interview, Gharty tells Ballard that Pembleton and Gee are obstructing the investigation to protect a rich and respected black family.

Pembleton and Bayliss learn Kaja has been in a Haitian prison for four months, eliminating him as a lead. Gee announces the Sun is running a story that Kaja has been cleared as a suspect, leaked from the police. Pembleton accuses Ballard and Gharty of leaking the story, while Gharty accuses Pembleton of going easy on Felix because of his social position. The discussion prompts a heated argument with accusations of racism from both sides. Pembleton agrees to interview Felix alone because he believes it will clear him. When he tells Felix he needs a blood test from him and his son, Felix admits that he had consensual sex with Brierre the night of the murder but denies killing her. Later, a devastated Pembleton and Gee still insist he should not necessarily be treated as a suspect, much to the disbelief of Ballard and Gharty. The detectives are interrupted by Felix's attorney, who says the family will not submit to a blood and hair test without a court order.

Meanwhile, Munch and Kellerman investigate a murder at Camden Yards during a late-season baseball game, leaving 48,000 possible suspects. The Long Island man, presumably a Yankees fan, is found beaten to death outside the stadium, and the governor pressures the Baltimore Police Department to solve the murder before the game ends so that millions in tourism dollars and ticket revenues will not be jeopardized. After several fruitless interviews, Munch and Kellerman question Scott Russell (Brian Tarantina), a New Yorker who attended the game with the victim. Russell admits he killed the victim because he said the Baltimore Orioles were a better team than the Yankees. He agrees to confess if the detectives let him watch the rest of the game. Back at the station, Falsone continues questioning detectives about the Mahoney shooting. Stivers expresses concern to Lewis that their covering for Kellerman's role in the shooting could bring both of them down if Falsone continues his questioning.

=== Part three ===
The Sun runs a front-page story accusing the homicide unit of protecting the Wilsons based on their race. Under pressure from his superiors, Gee demands they solve the murder immediately. Pembleton admits privately to his wife Mary (Ami Brabson) that he let his personal feelings of respect for Felix get in the way of the investigation. After searching the Wilson residence, the detectives find love letters written by Hal to Brierre. Pembleton questions Felix and Hal, who agree to talk only if their statements are not admissible in court. Pembleton presents them with the love letters, which Hal said he never had the courage to give to Brierre. Felix said he would not have had sex with Brierre if he had known, which Hal said he does not believe. Felix demands the truth from Hal, who admits to killing Brierre in a jealous rage upon learning of her affair with his father.

When Pembleton begins to read Hal his Miranda rights, Felix stops him and refuses to let him arrest his son. Later, prosecuting attorney Ed Danvers (Željko Ivanek) says because the confession is inadmissible, they have no evidence to arrest Hal and he refuses to issue an arrest warrant against a member of a prominent family without a solid case. The Wilsons decide to move to San Diego, and Felix tells Pembleton he will do everything he can to continue protecting his son. Pembleton and Ballard make a reluctant truce and, although Pembleton remains cold with her, he admits he was wrong about the Wilsons and that Ballard's instincts were correct. Gee tells Pembleton he too let his personal feelings cloud his judgment, and the two agree they will bring Hal back to Baltimore when they get enough evidence against him.

Meanwhile, Lewis and Falsone investigate the execution-style shootings of Wilkie Collins and his wife, presumably in retaliation for Collins cooperating with police in the capture of Georgia Rae Mahoney. They find Collins' young son Jack (Marc John Jefferies) hiding in a closet at the house, but he is too terrified to answer any of their questions. Falsone takes Jack to a park, where they bond over their mutual love of cars, and Falsone teaches him how to hotwire a vehicle. More comfortable with the police, Jack tells Falsone that a man identifying himself as Robert on Collins' answering machine has the same voice as the killer. A disturbed Stivers recognizes the voice as belonging to Detective Robert Castleman (Lance Lewman). After Jack identifies Castleman in a lineup, Lewis and Falsone confront him with the evidence during questioning, pressuring Castleman to confess to the murder. Castleman said Georgia Rae Mahoney blackmailed him into killing Collins by threatening to reveal Castleman had been on Luther's payroll.

== Production ==
Peter Gerety (left) and Callie Thorne (right) were introduced as regular cast members in "Blood Ties", along with Jon Seda (not pictured).

The story from "Blood Ties" was conceived by executive director Tom Fontana, and supervising producers James Yoshimura and Julie Martin. The first and third episode teleplays were written by producer Anya Epstein, with the second penned by producer David Simon. The three episodes were each directed by Alan Taylor, Nick Gomez and Mark Pellington, respectively. "Blood Ties" originally premiered in October 1997, about one month later than originally planned, which angered fans of the show. The delay is indicated by the regular-season baseball game prominently featured in the second episode of the arc, despite the fact that the 1997 Baltimore Orioles season ended in September.

"Blood Ties" featured the first appearances of Peter Gerety, Jon Seda and Callie Thorne as regular cast members on Homicide: Life on the Street. Thorne portrayed Laura Ballard, a former Seattle homicide unit detective, marking the character's first appearance in the series. Gerety and Seda each previously played their respective characters in guest appearances on the show; Seda's character Paul Falsone first appeared in the two-part fifth-season finale. Stuart Gharty, Gerety's character, is described as a transplant from the department's internal affairs department. Executive producer Tom Fontana said he thought the new cast additions would create drama and tension between the characters: "It's stimulating to add new people, because you're not feeling like you're writing or acting the same scene for the thousandth time, and I think all three of them are very different than any other characters we've had on the show."

During her audition for the show, Thorne read the lines from the Pembleton character in a previous episode. She said of her audition, "I said, 'So what do you want me to do? Do you want me to be a female Pembleton?' And they were like, 'Well we don't want to say that but that's sort of the idea." Thorne said the producers were looking for "a certain type in terms of a strong woman who could keep up with all the men" and that they incorporated elements of Thorne's own personality into the character, such as the strong amount of trust she has in her instincts. Thorne also said she was treated well by the cast, but upon starting, "I was very aware of the fact that it's predominantly men, and I have no problem saying that as a small, dark woman I was terrified. I thought I was going to be put through the ringer [sic]." Gerety, when asked about his experience joining the show, said only, "It's interesting. It's really interesting."

The new regular characters replaced outgoing cast members Melissa Leo and Max Perlich, who did not return for the sixth season. In the episode, Leo's character Kay Howard was said to be working full-time with the department's fugitive unit; actress Leo reportedly left the show so she could devote more time to her family. Perlich was allegedly fired from the series, and within the episode his character J. H. Brodie was said to have left police work after a documentary he filmed was aired on PBS and won an Emmy Award. Commentators said the Emmy mention, and a joke by Munch that "they give those things to anybody", were references to the show's failure to secure a nomination for Primetime Emmy Award for Outstanding Drama Series during its first five seasons. Armando Benítez and Scott Erickson, then pitchers with the Baltimore Orioles, make cameo appearances as themselves in the second "Blood Ties" episode.

The Wilson murder is a "red ball", a police case involving an innocent victim, widely known suspects or a combination of the two. Red ball cases tend to draw attention from the media, the public and high-ranking police brass, and often result in additional detectives being added to the case. Fontana thought these elements of the red ball case would help produce a strong season premiere and tension among the veteran characters who resent the meddling of the new detectives. Julie Martin, one of the show's writers and supervising producers, said "Blood Ties" marked a deliberate change in the series, focusing on darker story lines that are "a little messier and unresolved" and more interpersonal relationships: "The show's been on for six seasons, and it absolutely has to change. We can't keep doing the same show." Media outlets noted that "Blood Ties" included more action-oriented elements such as car chases and a chase sequence involving helicopters at an airport. Fontana denied allegations of tampering from NBC executives and said any such changes would have come from him: "I don't want us to have a style every week that we feel we have to conform to. ... I want people not to know what to expect when they tune in every week. We're not formulaic."

The New York Yankees baseball team refused to give Homicide: Life on the Street permission to use the Yankees logo in the episode, which Fontana said angered the writers and inspired them to portray Yankees fans in a particularly negative light. Fontana, a New York native himself, was later apologetic about this portrayal and said, "I kept telling the guys they were being a little harsh on the Yankees". The names "Stringfield" and "Doherty" can be seen under Ballard's case list on the white board. The names were purposely inserted as an inside joke to Homicide fans as a reference to online rumors that cast member Melissa Leo was to be replaced by actors Shannen Doherty or Sherry Stringfield. The false rumors were actually leaked by Tom Fontana himself to keep fans guessing.

"Blood Ties" and the rest of the sixth-season episodes were included in the six-DVD box-set Homicide: Life on the Street: The Complete Season 6, which was released by A&E Home Video on January 25, 2005, for $99.95.

== Themes ==
In portraying black members of the police department ignoring legitimate evidence to protect a prominent member of Baltimore's African American community, "Blood Ties" touches simultaneously on themes of police misconduct and racism, however inadvertent, from the characters of Pembleton and Gee. Because the episode involves discrimination among black characters, "Blood Ties" has been described as an example of "reverse racism", even though the majority of Baltimore's population is black. The episode also includes elements of classism, since Pembleton and Gee treat Felix Wilson differently than they would another black suspect based on his financial success and charitable contributions to the city and African American community.

Most of these themes are most overtly addressed during a climatic argument between Pembleton, Ballard and Gharty in the "Blood Ties" arc's second episode. When Ballard and Gharty suggest questioning Felix and Hal Wilson because the murder victim had sex the night she was killed, Pembleton accuses them of reverting to old stereotypes about black male sexuality, namely "that black men can't control themselves when it comes to blue shoes and tight pants". When Gharty describes Baltimore as a black-run town that protects its own, Pembleton points out similar practices were carried out in Baltimore history by the Italian Americans and Irish Americans when they primarily controlled the city; in particular, Pembleton says, "How many favors have been called in in the name of the Knights of Columbus or the St. Michael's Society, huh?"

Roger Wilkins, a history professor at George Mason University who studies race in the United States, said "Blood Ties" provided "insightful, wonderful explorations on the complexities of many levels of race." He also said the show "really does understand how we're all caught in this culture, and we're all struggling with it. And we all bring to this jagged enterprise the limited understanding of where we came from and who we are. Being fully alive requires us to struggle with these realities. That's what the show does." In his journal article about the portrayal of African American men in Homicide: Life on the Street, documentary historian Thomas A. Mascaro said the presentation of light-skinned black villains like Luther Mahoney and dark-skinned actors like the one played by James Earl Jones in "Blood Ties", "dispels the notion that black skin color is uniform or determinative with regard to character". Some media outlets described the Watson subplot as a racial spin on the 1996 murder of six-year-old child beauty pageant queen JonBenét Ramsey, although Tom Fontana said any similarities were not intended.

== Reception ==
The first episode of "Blood Ties" received an 8.1 Nielsen rating, which constituted 7.94 million households at the time. The episode outperformed Homicide's time-slot competitor, CBS's Nash Bridges, by about 588,000 households, although ABC's 20/20 beat both shows with 11.37 million households. The second and third episodes of "Blood Ties", however, finished behind both shows each week. The second episode received a 7.0 rating, which constituted 6.86 million households, compared to 7.94 million for Nash Bridges and 11.37 million for 20/20. The third episode received a 6.4 rating, which constituted 6.27 million views, compared to 7.94 million for Nash Bridges and 10.98 million for 20/20.

Homicide starts its sixth season with densely layered cases that confront the issues of racism, police misconduct, class conflicts, loyalty, fatal force and the ambiguous nature of justice. Life on the Street is never simple and always intriguing.

— Lon Grahnke,
Chicago Sun-Times

"Blood Ties" received generally positive reviews. The Baltimore Sun television critic David Zurawik described it as "one of the most serious, frank and compelling discussions of race in any medium" since an episode of NYPD Blue from 1995, in which actor Dennis Franz used the word "nigger". Mike Duffy of the Detroit Free Press described "Blood Ties" as "explosive (and) riveting", and wrote, "The smart, darkly humorous writing on Homicide is as strong as ever. So are the performances of a superb ensemble of actors." R.D. Heldenfels of the Akron Beacon Journal praised the episodes and called them "a complicated rumination on race and class". David Bianculli of the New York Daily News said the episode had an unpredictability that helped maintain the show's vitality, and said of the first two episodes, "Except for one moment in tonight's opener, I was on the edge of my seat for the entire two hours; at that moment, a surprise shooting shocked me right onto my feet." Newsday writer Verne Gay described "Blood Ties" as "brilliant drama" and "a superb piece of work (that) appears to be a novel variation on reverse discrimination". Regarding the first of the three episodes, Dallas Morning News writer Ed Bark said Seda and Thorne had "solid first impressions" and that the episode arc "has all the makings of another killer story line". Virginia Rohan of The Record of Bergen County, New Jersey, called the episode "gripping" and "another strong start for a terrific series".

Tony Norman of the Pittsburgh Post-Gazette praised the episode, which he said "has wandered into the heart of Dostoyevsky territory with its storylines". He particularly praised the episode for going outside its normal conventions by portraying lead characters like Pembleton and Gee as being so reluctant to do the right thing. Alan Pergament of The Buffalo News gave the episode four out of five stars; he particularly praised the performances of Thorne and Gerety, and said the show did an impressive job of introducing the new cast members. Michael Storey of Arkansas Democrat-Gazette said "Blood Ties" lived up to the high standards he said the show had set for itself. Ron Miller of Fort Worth Star-Telegram praised "Blood Ties", although he said he does not always enjoy Homicide: Life on the Street. He said the episode "starts fast and gets better and more intense by the minute", and described the climactic argument in the second episode as "the most turbulent internal dispute we've ever seen among the detectives". Rocky Mountain News writer Dusty Saunders praised the main story-line and said the subplots were well juxtaposed into the episode. He also said "Blood Ties" could serve as a good introduction to the series for new viewers. Alan Sepinwall, television critic for The Star-Ledger, criticized the addition of "silly" action-oriented scenes the traditionally more intelligent show, but praised "Blood Ties" and the addition of the new cast members. Sepinwall particularly praised the acting of Andre Braugher: "Pitted against a powerhouse like James Earl Jones, he not only holds his own, but at times is so dramatically forceful that the former voice of Darth Vader sounds intimidated." Not all reviews of "Blood Ties" were positive. Joanne Ostrow of The Denver Post said the series benefited from the new characters, but that the episode "asks viewers to believe rather too strongly in the inherent racism of certain characters we've come to know as heroes in seasons past". Ostrow also thought Pembleton's clashes with the new detectives was predictable.
