= Fallen Heroes (Homicide: Life on the Street) =

- Homicide: Life on the Street episodes
- Episode nos.: Season 6 Episodes 22 and 23
- Directed by: Kathryn Bigelow
- Story by: Eric Overmyer (Part 1); James Yoshimura (Part 2)
- Teleplay by: Lois Johnson (Part 1); Joy Lusco (Part 2)
- Cinematography by: Alex Zakrzewski
- Production codes: 622 and 623
- Original air dates: May 1, 1998; May 8, 1998

Guest appearance
- Mekhi Phifer as Junior Bunk/ Nathaniel Lee Mahoney

Episode chronology
← Previous "Finnegan's Wake"	Next → "La Famiglia"
- Homicide: Life on the Street season 6

"Fallen Heroes" is a two-part episode that concludes the sixth season of the American police drama television series Homicide: Life on the Street. It comprises the 99th and 100th overall episodes of the series, and originally aired on NBC in the United States on May 1, 1998 (Part 1) and May 8, 1998 (Part 2).

The episode marks the final appearances of recurring character Junior Bunk, as well as the series' break-out character, Frank Pembleton (not counting the television movie that appeared after the series). It also marks the last appearance of Mike Kellerman as a series regular, although actor Reed Diamond would later reprise this role as a guest star in a two-part episode of season seven.

== Plot summary ==
While Falsone and Stivers investigate the murder of a probation officer, Bayliss and Pembleton investigate the stabbing of Judge Gibbons, and conclude that the culprit was Nathaniel Lee Mahoney, Georgia Rae's son. Their search for Nathaniel Lee reaches a dead end until Meldrick Lewis reveals that Nathaniel Lee is also called "Junior Bunk", a small-time hood who had crossed paths with the Homicide detectives in previous episodes. When Bayliss and Pembleton bring Junior Bunk into the Box, they are taken aback by his new hard-core attitude, which contrasts sharply with his previously meek demeanor. Despite the detectives' confidence that the judge's murder was ordered by Georgia Rae, Junior refuses to give up his mother. Junior is left shackled to a desk in the squad room, where he waits to be processed and is mocked by Meldrick. Left unattended for a moment, Junior grabs a gun from an unlocked desk drawer, where he had seen a detective put it away earlier, and starts firing at officers. His shots kill three uniformed police officers, and also wound Ballard and Gharty in the foot and chest respectively. After he stops shooting, there is a moment when the police are too stunned to respond, and he takes advantage of this by demanding to be released. However, he is then immediately cut down in a hail of bullets from Giardello, Kellerman, Lewis, and Bayliss.

As Ballard and Gharty are rushed to surgery, Giardello declares all-out war on the Mahoney crime organization, resulting in a series of arrests and raids. In one raid, Georgia Rae is found dead, killed by her own panicked employees. When one fleeing suspect aims his weapon at Pembleton, Frank draws his Glock as well, but hesitates long enough for the perp to fire a shot. Tim Bayliss shoves Pembleton out of the way, and is hit by the bullet intended for Pembleton.

Meanwhile, Terri Stivers tells Giardello about her suspicions that this entire sequence of events is somehow the result of Luther Mahoney's shooting last year by Mike Kellerman, so Giardello orders Falsone and Pembleton to question Kellerman about the shooting. Not believing the official reports of the incident, the two assume that Mahoney was unarmed and that Lewis planted his gun, an accusation which outrages Kellerman. Based on Kellerman's body language, Pembleton realizes Luther was armed, but that his gun was lowered when Kellerman shot him, and thus the shooting can not be justified under "imminent danger". Kellerman admits to the truth of the shooting and angrily hands his badge to Pembleton, who refuses to look him in the eye. Having already turned his gun over to Falsone as per departmental procedure when the questioning began, Kellerman later has a private talk with Lewis and asks to borrow his gun and be left alone for a moment. Lewis refuses this request.

Giardello offers Kellerman two options. He can stay on the job and face a jury trial over the shooting; regardless of the outcome, though, he, Lewis, and Stivers (who were all on the scene) will certainly be fired once their false reports come to light. On the other hand, if Kellerman resigns immediately, then Giardello will consider the matter closed and the other two detectives can keep their jobs.

Giardello and Pembleton visit Bayliss in the hospital. Pembleton, who in the past had repeatedly expressed disdain for both friendship and God, breaks down and prays to God that his friend's life be spared. Motivated by guilt and worry over Bayliss' shooting, the strain of interrogating Kellerman, and his own moral outrage that corrupt detectives have been allowed to escape punishment, Pembleton hands in his badge and resigns.

In the final scene, Kellerman drunkenly confronts an irate customer at a bar, reflexively saying that he is a cop and opening his jacket to display the badge and gun clipped to his belt. They are no longer there, reminding him that he too has resigned, and his face floods with shame and regret as the customer laughs at him.
