= Subway (Homicide: Life on the Street) =

4th episode of the 6th season of Homicide: Life on the Street

- Homicide: Life on the Street episode
- Frank Pembleton talks to John Lange, a man pinned between a subway train and platform.
- Episode no.: Season 6 Episode 4
- Directed by: Gary Fleder
- Written by: James Yoshimura
- Cinematography by: Alex Zakrzewski
- Production code: 604
- Original air date: December 5, 1997

Guest appearances
- Vincent D'Onofrio as John Lange; Shari Elliker as witness; Bruce MacVittie as Larry Biedron; Laura MacDonald as Sarah Flannigan; Lisa Matthews as witness; Wendee Pratt as Joy Tolson

Episode chronology
← Previous "Saigon Rose"	Next → "All Is Bright"
- Homicide: Life on the Street season 6

"Subway" (sometimes referred to as "The Accident") is the fourth episode of the sixth season of the American police television drama Homicide: Life on the Street, and the 81st episode overall. It first aired on NBC in the United States on December 5, 1997. In the episode, John Lange (Vincent D'Onofrio) becomes pinned between a Baltimore Metro Subway train and the station platform. The Baltimore homicide department is informed that Lange will be dead within an hour and Pembleton tries to solve the case while comforting Lange in his final minutes.

"Subway" featured guest star Bruce MacVittie as a man suspected of pushing Lange into the path of the train. The episode was written by James Yoshimura, who co-produced with David Simon. It was directed by Gary Fleder and was the only episode of Homicide: Life on the Street helmed by the feature film director. Yoshimura based "Subway" on an episode of the HBO hidden-camera documentary show Taxicab Confessions, in which a New York City detective described a real-life instance of a man trapped between a subway train and platform.

"Subway" was filmed on location in a Maryland Transit Administration (MTA) station. Fleder included cinematic elements that were uncommon in the traditionally naturalistic show. This led to conflicts between Fleder and director of photography Alex Zakrzewski. "Subway" received overwhelmingly positive reviews but ranked number three in its time-slot during its original broadcast, capturing 10.3 million viewers but falling behind ABC's 20/20 and CBS's Nash Bridges.

The episode won a Peabody Award for excellence in television broadcasting and was nominated for two Emmy Awards, one for Yoshimura's script and one for D'Onofrio's guest performance. "Subway" was the subject of a two-hour PBS television documentary, Anatomy of a "Homicide: Life on the Street", which originally aired on the network on November 4, 1998. Screenwriter Vince Gilligan said "Subway" directly influenced an episode of The X-Files that he wrote, which in turn helped inspire the casting of Bryan Cranston in Breaking Bad.

== Synopsis ==
During an altercation on a crowded subway platform, John Lange (Vincent D'Onofrio) falls against a moving train and is pinned at waist level between a subway car and the edge of the platform. Detectives Frank Pembleton (Andre Braugher) and Tim Bayliss (Kyle Secor) arrive to investigate and are told the man's spinal cord is severed. Although Lange is not feeling much pain, emergency personnel tell the detectives he has less than an hour to live and will die as soon as he is moved. Bayliss questions Larry Biedron (Bruce MacVittie), who was involved with the altercation that led to Lange's fall. Biedron says he was bumped from behind with Lange, but witnesses give conflicting reports: Some say that Biedron pushed Lange, some that Lange pushed Biedron, and others say that it was an accident. Pembleton tries to talk to Lange, who becomes uncooperative and angry when told he is about to die.

Lange says that his girlfriend, Sarah Flannigan (Laura MacDonald), is jogging near the harbor, so Pembleton sends detectives Meldrick Lewis (Clark Johnson) and Falsone (Jon Seda) to look for her. Lewis and Falsone talk about the nature of death while questioning random joggers; their search effort proves fruitless. Lange tries to convince EMT Joy Tolson (Wendee Pratt) to give him painkillers, but she refuses because it will reduce their chances of saving his life, even while she insists he cannot be saved. Pembleton keeps Lange company, despite his initial annoyance at Lange's hostility. The emergency personnel plan to use airbags to push the subway train away from the platform, then pull Lange free and rush him to the hospital.

Pembleton and Lange grow closer; Lange experiences more pain as time passes, and switches among remorse, anger, and casual small talk during their conversations. Later, Pembleton holds Lange's hand to comfort him and confides about his recent stroke. Bayliss grows suspicious when Biedron says that he cannot recall his last place of work or when he moved to Baltimore. Biedron eventually admits that he had been criminally charged and placed into a psychiatric ward for pushing a man in front of a Chicago subway train for no reason. Biedron is arrested, and Bayliss confirms to Pembleton that Lange was pushed; Pembleton decides not to tell Lange because he does not think that it will comfort him, but Lange figures it out for himself by observing their conversation. Lange experiences greater pain and starts to lose consciousness. After saying "I'm OK" to Pembleton, Lange falls unconscious and the EMTs push the train with the airbags. Lange dies immediately after he is removed. A shocked and disoriented Pembleton leaves the subway and, after staring at Biedron in the back of a police squad car, walks to his vehicle while recalling a line about what happens to sugar maple leaves when it rains (a line that Lange said as he was dying). He then drives away with Bayliss. The episode ends with Flannigan jogging past the subway station.

== Pre-production ==
=== Conception ===
"I would look at the "Subway" episode as a throwback to early television. They used to get an idea, played it out rather simply, explored the human condition or what the phenomenon was about in a very simple kind of matter, and said, 'Let's just rely on that. Let's rely on the performance and the writing.'"

— Barry Levinson,
executive producer

James Yoshimura, one of the Homicide: Life on the Street writers and supervising producers, first conceived the story for "Subway" after watching an episode of the HBO series Taxicab Confessions, which features hidden-camera footage of taxi passengers discussing their lives with the drivers. In the episode he saw, a New York Police Department detective discussed an experience in which a man was pushed and trapped between a subway train and station platform. Although the man was initially still alive, the homicide department was called in to investigate because emergency officials said they knew that he would eventually die. The detective said that the incident was the most upsetting thing he ever saw. He likened the twisting of the body to that of a plastic bag being spun around quickly and turning like a corkscrew, and said that when the train was removed and the body was twisted back, "All your guts fall down and in less than a minute, you're dead."

Yoshimura first pitched the show to the Homicide: Life on the Street production team in May 1997 at the San Francisco production center of executive producer Barry Levinson. The episode was discussed and well-received during a round-table discussion involving Levinson, executive producer Tom Fontana, producer David Simon, supervising producer Julie Martin, and consulting producer Gail Mutrux. During that meeting, Martin suggested that the transit authority should pressure the police to resolve the homicide case quickly and get the trains moving again, an element which Yoshimura eventually added to the script. Levinson suggested ending the episode with the detectives walking back to the surface, then feeling the hum and vibration of the train starting back up under their feet. This suggestion, however, did not appear in the final episode.

Distressed from a long stretch of poor ratings, NBC executives placed pressure on Homicide: Life on the Street producers to improve its viewership and become more popular than its higher-rated time-slot competitor, Nash Bridges. Yoshimura and the other producers, however, decided to continue pushing the envelope with "Subway" because they felt the series needed to maintain its quality and survive. "Subway" had to be greenlighted by NBC before a script could be written, and Yoshimura anticipated backlash about the episode. He said, "Every episode, we have trouble with NBC, so this is no different. We've fought that battle, we've had five years of that, so it doesn't matter to us." However, the executives were surprisingly enthusiastic about the premise. Warren Littlefield, then-president of NBC Entertainment, said his first reaction was "the classic response of a network programmer: 'Oh my God, this is scary'", but that he quickly came around to the idea and greenlighted the project.

=== Writing ===
"When I first heard this, I said, 'This is a horrifying idea for a script' because I thought for sure it would be lurid and sensational and overwrought and somehow some sort of elemental and wonderful television lesson would arise from it, which frankly nauseated me."

— Andre Braugher, actor

In writing the script for "Subway", Yoshimura wanted the Pembleton character to be confronted with his own mortality, a theme that had continued from the previous season in which the character suffered a stroke. Although Pembleton does not typically discuss his own feelings, Yoshimura wanted him to be placed in a situation in which he not only discussed death, but is also led by the unique circumstance of Lange's subway incident to confide his stroke experience to an almost complete stranger. From the beginning of the writing process, Yoshimura specifically wanted the Lange character to be mean and unpleasant, rather than the nice and innocent victim more typically portrayed in such television episodes: "Tragedy can happen to jerky people too and I think it'd be much more interesting to see how that kind of character's circumstances transcends the typical clichéd TV kind of victim."

Yoshimura wanted Braugher to treat D'Onofrio like he was "bad luck" and try to keep his distance at first, but gradually come to view him as a person and form a close bond with him by the end of the episode. A New York City firefighter, Tim Brown, was a consultant for most of the technical information in the episode. In addition to helping Yoshimura with the dialogue from medical staff characters, Brown advised Yoshimura on the method of using air bags to push the subway train forward and remove Lange's body. Yoshimura included conflicting reports from witnesses about how the incident took place, which the writer described as a "Rashomon thing", in reference to the 1950 Japanese film in which several characters offer differing descriptions of the same murder. "Subway" continued a sixth season trend in which the detectives became more personally involved with the victims, and thus becoming more emotionally drained at their deaths. For example, in the episode "Birthday", which aired a month earlier, Falsone interviewed a victim who eventually died at the conclusion of the episode. It was the first television script Attanasio ever wrote.

Yoshimura included a B story of Lewis and Falsone looking for Lange's girlfriend to provide comic relief and so that the entire episode would not be confined to the subway platform location. Yoshimura wanted the two detectives to also discuss the nature of mortality and death, but deliberately included black humor in their dialogue and made sure the characters did not act "teary-eyed [or] philosophical", because he believed it would be clichéd and an inaccurate depiction of how real detectives would behave. Some viewers were offended or startled by the flippant nature of the discussions about death between the two characters. Lange's girlfriend jogged behind Lewis and Falsone during a scene in which the two detectives were distracted in a discussion; Yoshimura deliberately included this in the episode to create a moment of irony. The line by Falsone to a jogger, "Are you sure you're not Sarah?", and Lewis' mocking reaction to the question, were both ad-libbed by the actors.

Executive producers Barry Levinson and Tom Fontana reviewed the script after it was finished and made minor suggestions for changes. In the original script, Yoshimura made Pembleton more confrontational with the firefighters and emergency personnel, but this aspect of the script was changed when Fontana suggested it was too distracting. NBC executives indicated they would have preferred Lewis and Falsone find Lange's girlfriend and bring her back to the subway station before Lange died, but Yoshimura described that scenario as a "typical TV ending" and was vehemently opposed to any such change. Fontana also defended the original ending because he said Pembleton ends up filling the role that Lange's girlfriend would have filled.

On August 18, 1997, four days before shooting on the episode began, NBC censors provided 17 pages of notes to Yoshimura requiring changes regarding violence and language. A typical Homicide: Life on the Street episode usually results in only three or four pages. Yoshimura made several modifications with the help of his writing assistant Joy Lusco, a future writer on Simon's HBO series The Wire. The changes included removing several instances of the words "ass" and "bitch" from the script. Lange's line, "Why am I even saying the son of a bitch's name?" was changed to "Why am I even saying the twerp's name?", and his line, "Go find another train and throw your miserable stupid ass in front of it" was changed to "throw yourself in front of it".

=== Casting and director hiring ===
Consulting producer Gail Mutrux recommended feature film director Gary Fleder to direct "Subway" because she believed he would provide visually engaging direction without distracting from the story in the script. Other Homicide: Life on the Street producers were not familiar with Fleder. When Mutrux told them the name of one of his previous films, Things to Do in Denver When You're Dead, Yoshimura became concerned Fleder was "one of these indie kind of guys [who is] going to come in and try to reinvent our show", a problem he had experienced with other directors in the past. After watching Things to Do in Denver When You're Dead, however, Yoshimura believed Fleder would be perfect to direct "Subway" because he felt that Fleder could provide strong visuals to a story that took place in one location, and prevent the script from becoming too static and boring. Upon being offered the job, Fleder thought that it would be a challenge due to most of the action being confined to a single set, but accepted the director position based on the strength of Yoshimura's script:, "The script was terrific. And for me, the big issue from day one was, 'How do I not screw it up?'" Yoshimura said that feature directors often struggle with Homicide: Life on the Street because they are used to working at a slower and more deliberate pace than the typical eight-day filming period of a single episode. Additionally, Yoshimura said, they have little time to adjust to the regular cast and crew, which he described as a "closed community [who are] used to shooting or working a certain way on this show, and then have their rhythms and their patterns and their habits".

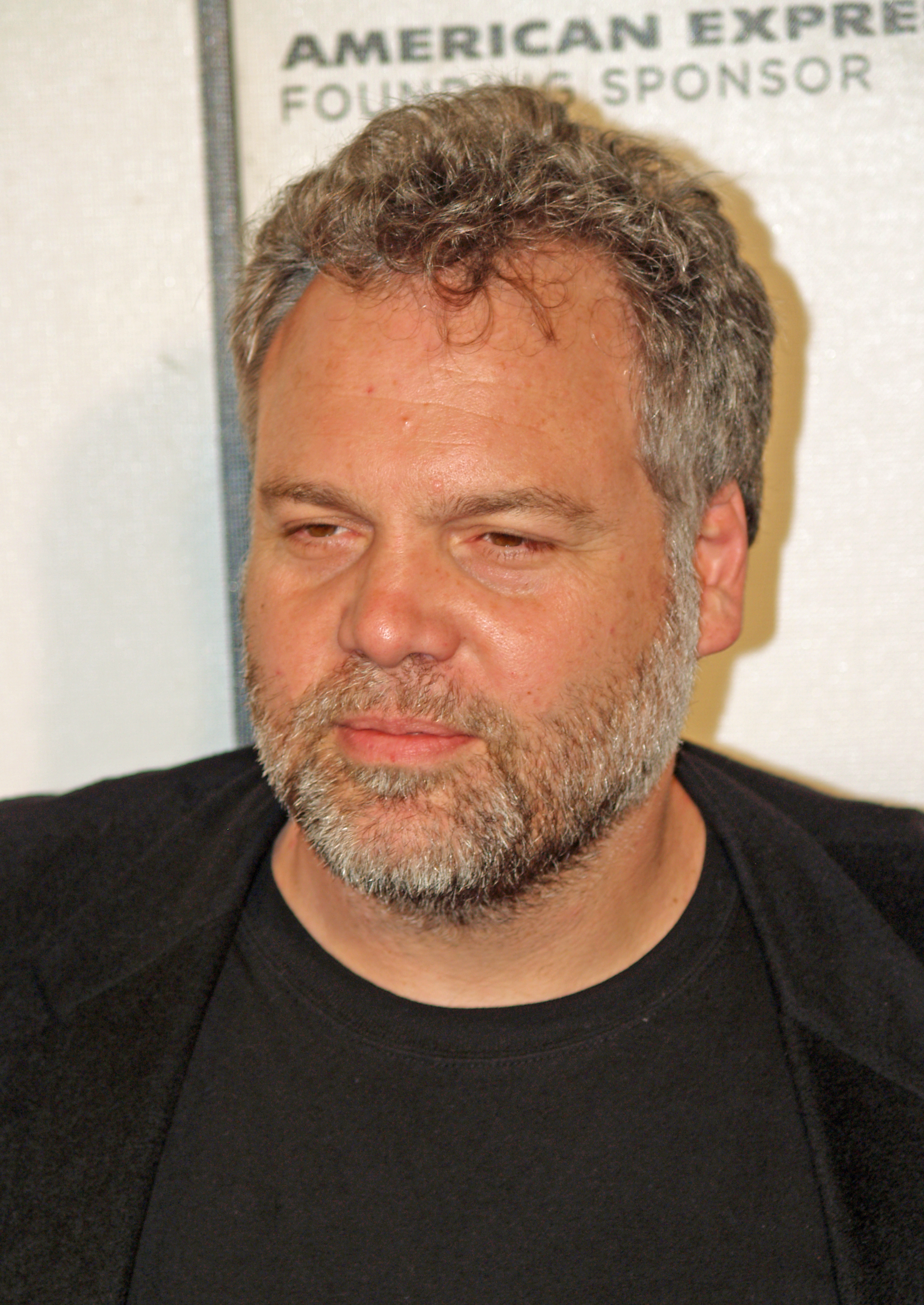
Vincent D'Onofrio (pictured) accepted the role after casting director Brett Goldstein sent the script directly to him.

Casting director Brett Goldstein contacted Vincent D'Onofrio's agent about playing the part of John Lange, but the agent said D'Onofrio would never work in television and refused to even suggest the part to the actor. Goldstein remained convinced the actor was right for the role, and mailed the script directly to D'Onofrio; the actor liked the script and agreed to play the part. The agent later contacted Goldstein a second time, and they got into a dispute over how much money D'Onofrio would be paid. Yoshimura said that D'Onofrio was not the kind of actor he originally envisioned for the part, although he later praised his performance. D'Onofrio said he was attracted to the part based on the strength of the script and the reputation of Homicide: Life on the Street, although he had never seen the show himself. Fleder, D'Onofrio and Andre Braugher had only between two and three hours to read the script, discuss the characters and rehearse the material. Braugher said his first reaction to the episode premise was that it was a "horrifying idea" because he thought it would be sensational and end with a clichéd moral, which Braugher said "frankly, nauseated me, the idea of that". But Braugher said that he was extremely satisfied with Yoshimura's final script.

Bruce MacVittie auditioned for the role of Larry Biedron by mailing a tape of himself performing to the show's producers. Yoshimura had previously seen MacVittie perform on the New York City stage and thought that he was a "wonderful, wonderful actor". After watching his rehearsal tape, Yoshimura settled on MacVittie for the part based not only on his acting, but also on his short physical stature. Yoshimura said, "I'm watching this tape and I'm thinking, 'Yeah, this little guy! Who would suspect this little guy to have these murderous kinds of tendencies.'" Laura MacDonald was also cast as Lange's girlfriend Sarah Flannigan based on an audition tape she sent to the show. Wendee Pratt was cast as emergency medical technician Joy Tolson, who works to help Lange throughout the episode but does not get along with him. Yoshimura said that he particularly enjoyed Pratt's performance "because she's not playing at all sympathetic. This guy's a pain in her ass." Shari Elliker, then a talk host on WBAL Radio, made a cameo appearance as a witness in the subway.

=== Preparation ===
NBC sought permission to film "Subway" in an MTA station, but the authority was initially hesitant to allow filming for a script that portrayed their train as the source of a fatal accident. Since it was too late to build a set, co-executive producer Jim Finnerty told Yoshimura to wait before writing the script because of the strong possibility that the episode could never be filmed. When Yoshimura insisted on continuing anyway, Finnerty angrily stormed out of the meeting. However, Finnerty was eventually able to convince the authority to allow filming in one of their stations. Yoshimura also sought 300 extras to play firefighters, emergency medical personnel, transit workers and commuters. Finnerty authorized the use of more extras than an episode usually received, but refused to pay for 300 extras, forcing Yoshimura to make minor modifications to the script.

Seven days of pre-production began on August 15, 1997. On the first day, Fleder met with Yoshimura and Fontana to discuss the script and the director's vision for the episode. Fleder suggested modifying the prologue, and storyboarded the introduction which was included in the episode. The new prologue involved commuters coming down to the train station while a street band performed, leading up to the subway accident before the opening credits rolled. The song featured in this prologue, "Killing Time", was written by Lisa Matthews, the lead singer of the Baltimore-area band Love Riot. Matthews also had a brief cameo on "Subway" as one of the witnesses to Lange's fall. On August 16, the show creators scouted out the Johns Hopkins Hospital Metro Subway Station, where the episode was to be filmed. At the request of the authority, the subway was renamed the fictional Inner Harbor station during filming. Fleder himself had only one hour to scout the location with his technical crew. Art director Vincent Peranio created a dummy wall to place in the empty space between two subway cars, making it appear that the two trains were one big car. Inside the dummy wall was a space in which the actor could stand and appear cut. Stunt coordinator G.A. Aguilar also choreographed the accident that day, and Peranio simulated the accident itself by tying a dummy into the hole in the dummy wall. Peranio originally wanted a stuntman to fall against the moving train, spin and fall into the padded hole in the dummy wall, but the transit authority refused to allow it.

== Production ==
=== Filming ===
"I need thousands of extras. I need firemen and emergency paramedics and transit supervisors and transit workers and commuters. This is going to be like Ben-Hur, except in a subway."

— James Yoshimura, writer

The episode was filmed in seven days, starting on August 26, 1997. The MTA gave permission for filming to take place in one of their subways, but only allowed shooting to take place between 6 p.m. and 6 a.m. when the trains were not running. The restrictive hours, short preparation time, confining shooting space and excessive heat due to lack of ventilation created additional stresses to the crew of more than 100 people during the filming of the episode. The tight schedule and lack of rehearsal time was difficult on the actors, but D'Onofrio said that it added "a certain velocity and energy" to the shoot, which made the dialogue from the actors feel less rehearsed and more spontaneous. Yoshimura served as the on-set consulting editor during filming along with fellow producer David Simon, who wrote the book Homicide: A Year on the Killing Streets, from which the series was adapted. The cast and crew shot between seven and nine pages of the script each of the seven production days. Fleder said he was impressed by this pace because he usually shoots between one and two pages per day during his movies, and he said that the actors on Homicide: Life on the Street were better prepared and more cooperative than his usual film actors.

Fleder dedicated a great deal of focus to establishing the correct chemistry between Braugher and D'Onofrio. Fleder said, "The energy between them had to be [strong] because they're carrying the episode. The audience is centered on them and if either of them falters, the whole episode kind of falls apart." The first day of shooting had to take place outside the subway station, so all outside scenes were shot first. As a result, the final scenes of the episode were shot on the first day. Among those scenes were Pembleton leaving the subway in a daze following Lange's death; Yoshimura deeply regretted that this was one of the first scenes shot because he felt that the performance would have been more moving if Braugher had some previous dramatic interaction with D'Onofrio.

The stunt simulating Lange's fall into the subway train was filmed on August 27, the second production day, and Yoshimura said that it was the most challenging part of the shoot. D'Onofrio and MacVittie had to arrive at the platform just as the subway train was approaching, and their scene had to be reshot several times because the train did not pass the actors on time. The crew also filmed shots of a dummy dressed as Lange being dragged by the train inside the dummy wall, but most of those scenes were not used in the final cut. The remaining five filming days focused primarily on the scenes between Braugher and D'Onofrio, which Yoshimura and Fleder felt were the most crucial element of the episode. During the filming of the climactic scene with Pembleton and Lange which ends with Lange's death, several members of the crew reacted emotionally, something Yoshimura said is extremely rare because the crew members typically look at their work as a job and do not become emotionally invested in the story that they are filming.

While shooting the first subway scenes, D'Onofrio gave a performance that was over-the-top and bombastic. Yoshimura asked him to act a little calmer during the earlier scenes and save the energy for the later scenes, because "if he did go up right away, there was nowhere else for him to go after that". D'Onofrio agreed and modified his performance accordingly. Fleder also clashed with MacVittie over his portrayal of the Biedron character. Fleder felt that the character appeared too crazy in earlier scenes, and that the actor was telegraphing the twist in which MacVittie would turn out to be a murderer. MacVittie approached Yoshimura about the criticism, but Yoshimura agreed with Fleder's interpretation. After MacVittie toned down the character's behavior, Fleder said that he was extremely pleased with the result.

Many of the firefighters appearing as extras in "Subway" were Baltimore firefighters. Yoshimura said that the firefighters who appeared to be running in the episode were actors, while the real firefighters walked slowly because, based on their real-life experience, they knew that there would be no need to rush in a situation involving a fatality. Although power on the railings were turned off during shooting, the crew and producers were not aware that some residual electricity continues to run through the cars even after the tracks have been shut down. At one point during the shooting, D'Onofrio felt a charge of that electricity run through him and said, "I'm really feeling something strange here." The crew initially believed D'Onofrio to be ad-libbing a line of dialogue in character, but eventually realized he was being electrified. When the MTA explained about the residual electricity, the crew installed rubber insulation so that D'Onofrio would not touch the metal of the train and experience any electricity. Fleder was impressed that D'Onofrio continued with the shoot, and said, "Most actors I worked with would've left the set at that point."

=== Photography ===
"Subway" was shot by Alex Zakrzewski, the series' regular director of photography. The episode was staged so that Pembleton is initially keeping his distance from Lange, but gradually moves closer and closer as they begin to bond, and by the end is sitting next to him and holding his hand. Accordingly, the initial scenes included wider shots with Braugher and D'Onofrio on the outer edges of the frame, but later scenes included more close-ups of the two sitting together. Although Homicide: Life on the Street typically employs a number of back-and-forth whip pan-style cuts, Fleder asked that the style be modified for this episode. In earlier scenes, Fleder asked for wider long shots to create a sense of setting within the subway station, and as the episode progressed and the story became more intense, he then allowed more close-ups and whip pans. This led to disagreements on the set between Fleder and Zakrzewski, who felt Fleder was trying to being too disruptive and difficult. Fleder said of his behavior, "I have to admit, I'm not the most charming guy on the set. I'm just not. When I'm on the set, I'm very focused and my humor goes away and I become not so charming." After the episode was complete, Fleder said that he and Zakrzewski settled their differences and were both happy with the final result.

Fleder also asked for stylistic touches on the episode which were inconsistent with the show's typical emphasis on documentary-style realism. For example, he arranged for red scrim lighting to reflect on the subway car to add an artistic visual touch, even though there was nothing in particular in the subway station that reflected such a light. Upon hearing of the technique, Yoshimura was initially concerned, saying "Oh, he's getting artsy fartsy with me." Just before Lange's death, Fleder included a close-up with Braugher looking directly into the camera, breaking the fourth wall in a way typically forbidden on the show. During an outdoor dialogue scene between Johnson and Seda while the characters were driving in a car, Fleder filmed it by placing the camera outside the car's front windshield and panning back and forth between the two actors. Unbeknownst to Fleder, all car shots on Homicide: Life on the Street are only allowed to be filmed from inside the car to keep the scene more realistic. As a result of Fleder's car scene, a memo was circulated to the cast and crew reminding them of this policy and threatening to fire anybody who allowed a scene to be shot through the windshield again.

=== Editing ===
The episode was edited by series regular Jay Rabinowitz in a Manhattan NBC facility, with consultation at various times by Fleder, Yoshimura and Tom Fontana. Rabinowitz edited the episode for several days alone, then worked with Fleder for four days, making hundreds of edits to the episode. Yoshimura worked with the editor next and was disappointed with the first cut of the episode that he saw, claiming that it needed to be "a lot more frenetic and chaotics at the end, and not so artsy". Yoshimura also told Rabinowitz that the final cut of the episode should place strong emphasis on Braugher because he felt that the story is experienced "through his eyes". During the editing process, Yoshimura originally removed a scene featuring a silhouette of Pembleton riding the escalator out of the subway station after Lange died. Yoshimura felt that the shot was too sentimental, but Levinson personally had it placed back in the episode after Fleder claimed to have "begged" for it to be included. When Fontana first watched the episode, he felt that the prologue was too confusing because it was difficult to tell what happened during the accident scene. It was edited so that rather focusing on medium shots of D'Onofrio and MacVittie, it included a wider shot to establish the presence of a subway train before the accident so viewers would not be so confused.

Audio tracks were mixed with recorded sounds from real subway cars, as well as PA system announcements, to make the episode sound more authentic. In the original episode, Pembleton grabbed Biedron by the collar of his shirt while Biedron sat in the back of a squad car during one of the final scenes. The scene was modified so that Pembleton only looked at Biedron, because Yoshimura felt that the scene was just as effective without him grabbing Biedron. During the last scene of the episode, in which Lange's girlfriend jogs by the subway station and ignores the emergency vehicles, Rabinowitz was originally instructed to include a musical score. He tried many different types of music, including rock music, Irish music, classical music, jazz, and piano riffs. When none of the music worked, Fontana suggested including no music at all, and it was agreed the silence was the most effective solution. Fontana said that after watching the episode repeatedly during the editing process, he liked the final product but doubted he would watch it again for a long time because it was "too emotionally draining".

== Reception ==
=== Reviews and ratings ===
"The usual (ratings) payoffs were not there. It was kind of a disparaging arc, but if you had 10, 15 million people watch it, those 10 or 15 million people are getting an artistic experience that is as genuine and accomplished and crafted as you'll get anywhere."

— John Leonard, critic

"Subway" was originally scheduled to air during the 1997 November sweeps season, but lower-than-expected ratings for the three-part sixth-season premiere, "Blood Ties", prompted NBC to move its broadcast date to December 5 and heavily promote it. The strategy also gave the press more time to preview it and generate reviews. Warren Littlefield said, "The feeling was let's get out of the insanity of the sweeps and say, 'This is a little different'—hopefully we'll bring more people to this episode." During this time, the episode was renamed "The Accident" in some advertising materials.

When all the Nielsen ratings markets were accounted for, "Subway" was listed as having been seen by 10.3 million households. It was the third-highest ranked show in its time-slot, behind ABC's 20/20, which was seen by 17.7 million households, and CBS's Nash Bridges, which was seen by 11.9 million. NBC executives had hoped that the extensive promotion and press coverage of "Subway" would help it outperform Nash Bridges and so lift Homicide: Life on the Street above its usual third place in the rankings. When it did not, "Subway" was considered a commercial failure, and helped fuel already existing discussions within NBC on whether to cancel the show.

Reviews were overwhelmingly positive for "Subway". It was identified by The Baltimore Sun as one of the ten best episodes of the series, with Sun writer Chris Kaltenbach declaring, "Dramas don't come any better than this." Kinney Littlefield of the Orange County Register said it was "perhaps the best Homicide episode ever" and praised D'Onofrio's performance. USA Today gave the episode its highest rating of four stars. Tom Shales of The Washington Post called it, "a tour de force for D'Onofrio and Braugher". Entertainment Weekly writer Bruce Fretts said, "This is as gripping an hour of television as you're ever likely to see." Television and literary critic John Leonard said that "Subway" was "an artistic experience that is as genuine and accomplished and crafted as you will get anywhere". David P. Kalat, author of Homicide: Life on the Street: The Unofficial Companion, said of the episode, "Writer James Yoshimura proves that he has not lost his touch, with yet another truly grueling screenplay."

=== Awards and nominations ===
"Subway" won a 1998 Peabody Award for excellence in television broadcasting. The episode also received two Emmy Award nominations for the 1997–98 season. James Yoshimura was nominated for an Emmy for Outstanding Writing in a Drama Series for the episode's script, and Vincent D'Onofrio received a nomination for Outstanding Guest Actor in a Drama Series. It lost both nominations; NYPD Blue won the best writing Emmy for the fifth season episode "Lost Israel", and John Larroquette won the guest actor award for his appearance in "Betrayal", a second-season episode of The Practice. However, Jay Rabinowitz and Wayne Hyde won an International Monitor Award for best editing in a film-oriented television series.

In 2009, TV Guide ranked "Subway" #25 on its list of the 100 Greatest Episodes.

=== Cultural influences ===
Vincent D'Onofrio's character in "Subway" partially inspired the creation of the antagonist played by Bryan Cranston in "Drive", a sixth season episode of The X-Files, which first aired on November 15, 1998. In the episode, Cranston's character is unpleasant and anti-semitic, but he is dying throughout the episode, and screenwriter Vince Gilligan intended for the audience to sympathize with him despite his unlikeable qualities. Gilligan said that this was influenced by "Subway", which he called an "amazing episode". He said of D'Onofrio's character: "The brilliant thing they did in this episode, the thing that stuck with me, was this guy's an asshole, the guy really is unpleasant, and yet at the end (you) still feel his humanity." The casting of Cranston in this role directly led Gilligan to eventually cast him as the lead in his television series Breaking Bad.

== PBS documentary "Anatomy of a 'Homicide: Life on the Street'" ==
WGBH-TV, a Boston-based Public Broadcasting Service station, produced a 75-minute television documentary about the episode "Subway" called Anatomy of a "Homicide: Life on the Street". The documentary was written, produced and directed by filmmaker Theodore Bogosian, and was originally broadcast on November 4, 1998, at 9 p.m. on PBS. The film focused predominantly on James Yoshimura, beginning with his conception of the script and ending with his reaction to the episode's television broadcast and the ratings numbers. The documentary included a brief featurette about Homicide: Life on the Street and its history of both critical acclaim and low ratings. It also focused on the balance between art and business, with Yoshimura and the other producers trying to produce an intelligent, high-quality episode while also capturing high ratings.

The documentary crew put wireless microphones on several of the actors and crew and followed them through the conception, pre-production, filming, editing, screening and reception of "Subway". Many people involved with the show found the process extremely disruptive. In particular, Fleder said that he hates to be photographed and found the camera crew distracting and stressful. Fleder, who agreed to interviews for the documentary but refused to wear a microphone on the set, said of the crew, "To pull off a show like this, a seven-day shoot with this much dialogue and this many shots per day, you have to be really, really focused, and for me the thing with the documentary crew kept pulling away from the focus."

Rob Owen, television editor of the Pittsburgh Post-Gazette, said that the documentary provided an interesting, entertaining and detailed look behind the scenes of the show. Owen said that this was "rare, because TV doesn't usually reveal details about itself. It's nice to see PBS pulling back the curtain on its competition, and I wish it happened more often." Manuel Mendoza of The Dallas Morning News praised it, calling it "a documentary as rare to public TV as Homicide is to commercial television", but said that it "falls short of being definitive" because it cannot address all elements of the series due to its brief running time. Several commentators praised the humorous scene in the documentary in which Yoshimura goes line-by-line through his script and replaces curse words based on orders from NBC censors.
