= 51st Writers Guild of America Awards =

51st WGA Awards
- Date: 1999
- Organized by: Writers Guild of America, East and the Writers Guild of America, West

The 51st Writers Guild of America Awards, given in 1999, honored the film and television best writers of 1998.

== Film ==
=== Best Adapted Screenplay ===
Out of Sight – Scott Frank

- A Civil Action – Steven Zaillian
- Gods and Monsters – Bill Condon †
- Primary Colors – Elaine May
- A Simple Plan – Scott B. Smith

=== Best Original Screenplay ===
Shakespeare in Love – Marc Norman and Tom Stoppard †

- Bulworth – Warren Beatty and Jeremy Pikser
- The Opposite of Sex – Don Roos
- Saving Private Ryan – Robert Rodat
- The Truman Show – Andrew Niccol

== Television ==
=== Best Episodic Drama ===
"Proofs for The Existence of God" – Nothing Sacred – Paul Leland

- "Exodus" – ER – Walon Green and Joe Sachs
- "Apollo One" – From the Earth to the Moon – Graham Yost
- "Finnegan's Wake" – Homicide: Life on the Street – David Mills, James Yoshimura and David Simon
- "Saigon Rose" – Homicide: Life on the Street – Eric Overmyer
- "The Subway" – Homicide: Life on the Street – James Yoshimura
- "Burned" – Law & Order – Siobhan Byrne
- "Betrayal" – The Practice – David E. Kelley
- "The Marie Taquet Story" – Rescuers: Stories of Courage: Two Couples – Cy Chermak, Francine Carroll and Malka Drucker

=== Best Episodic Comedy ===
"Frasier's Imaginary Friend" – Frasier – Rob Greenberg

- "Pilot" – Dharma & Greg – Dottie Dartland and Chuck Lorre
- "Emma" – Ellen – Lawrence Broch
- "Never Can Say Goodbye" – Murphy Brown – Diane English

=== Best Long Form – Adapted ===
The Love Letter – James S. Henerson

- Don King: Only in America – Kario Salem
- Thicker Than Blood – Bill Cain
