= Homicide: Life on the Street season 6 =

Homicide: Life on the Street
- Season 6
- Season 6 U.S. DVD cover
- Starring: Richard Belzer; Andre Braugher; Reed Diamond; Michelle Forbes; Peter Gerety; Clark Johnson; Yaphet Kotto; Kyle Secor; Jon Seda; Callie Thorne
- No. of episodes: 23

Release
- Original network: NBC
- Original release: October 17, 1997 – May 8, 1998

Season chronology
- ← Previous; Season 5 Next → Season 7

The sixth season of Homicide: Life on the Street aired in the United States on the NBC television network from October 17, 1997 to May 8, 1998 and contained 23 episodes.

The sixth season marked the debut of character Detective Laura Ballard (Callie Thorne). Detectives Frank Pembleton (Andre Braugher) and Mike Kellerman (Reed Diamond) depart the show in the season finale. Chief Medical Examiner Julianna Cox departs mid-season, with her last appearance being in the episode "Lies and Other Truths". Detectives Paul Falsone (Jon Seda) and Stuart Gharty (Peter Gerety), both of whom appeared in the Season 5 finale, become regular characters.

The DVD box set of season 6 was released for Region 1 on January 25, 2005. The set includes all 23 season 6 episodes on six discs.

Going into the sixth season, NBC gave the series producers an ultimatum to make Homicide more popular than its CBS timeslot competitor Nash Bridges or face cancellation. When this goal was not reached, the studio began serious consideration to canceling the show, but a number of unexpected events at NBC increased Homicide's value. Among those factors were the loss of the popular series Seinfeld and the $850 million deal needed to keep ER from leaving the network. As a result, the show received a 22-episode seventh season.

Andre Braugher would go on to win the only Emmy and, in 1999, Golden Globe awards the series would ever receive.

== Episodes ==
When first shown on network television, multiple episodes were aired out of order. The DVD present the episodes in the correct chronological order, restoring all storylines and character developments.

No. overall	No. in season	Title	Directed by	Written by	Original release date	Prod. code	U.S. viewers (millions)
78	1	"Blood Ties, Part 1"	Alan Taylor	Story by : Tom Fontana & Julie Martin; Teleplay by : Anya Epstein	October 17, 1997	601	11.44
After the summer rotation, the homicide unit reassembles itself with several personnel changes. Brodie and Howard are gone, and Falsone and Gharty have transferred in, along with newcomer Laura Ballard from Seattle. Lewis teams with Falsone, leaving Kellerman to partner with Munch; someone shoots at both pairs of detectives, then kills a woman being escorted home by Stivers. The shooter is Junior Bunk, acting on orders from his mother Georgia Rae (Luther Mahoney's sister) to get revenge on Kellerman, Lewis, and Stivers. She is arrested as she tries to flee the country, while Falsone begins to question the trio's accounts of the Mahoney shooting. Meanwhile, Melia Brierre, the housekeeper for prominent black businessman Felix Wilson, is found dead in a hotel bathroom. Cast: First appearances of Det. Laura Ballard, and Hazelle Goodman as Georgia Rae Mahoney. Guest starring (all three parts): James Earl Jones as Felix Wilson, Lynne Thigpen as Regina Wilson, Mekhi Phifer as Junior Bunk, and Jeffrey Wright as Hal Wilson.
79	2	"Blood Ties, Part 2"	Nick Gomez	Story by : Tom Fontana & James Yoshimura; Teleplay by : David Simon	October 24, 1997	602	9.71
The Brierre case continues, with Ballard wanting to focus on the Wilsons and Pembleton insisting that the victim's former boyfriend is involved. Gee favors Pembleton's theory, leading each detective to think that the other's ideas are racially motivated. When Felix is brought in for questioning, he admits that he had sex with Melia, but his attorneys cut off any further cooperation by the family. Falsone's curiosity about the Mahoney shooting rankles the trio and causes Cox to start doubting their accounts herself. During an Orioles home game at Camden Yards, Munch and Kellerman investigate a Yankees fan found dead in the stadium stairwell; with another fan's help, they close the case before the game ends. Cameos: Armando Benítez and Scott Erickson
80	3	"Blood Ties, Part 3"	Mark Pellington	Story by : Tom Fontana & Julie Martin & James Yoshimura; Teleplay by : David Simon & Anya Epstein	October 31, 1997	603	9.10
Under pressure by Barnfather to close the Brierre case, Gee reluctantly allows the detectives to get search warrants for the Wilson home. A stack of love letters to Melia, written by Felix's son Hal, leads to a confession that cannot be used as evidence in court. The Wilsons leave Baltimore in order to avoid a murder indictment, and Pembleton and Ballard make peace. When the drug dealer who gave the tip on Junior Bunk is found murdered along with his wife, Lewis and Falsone turn to his young son to find the shooter - a narcotics detective on the Mahoney payroll. Cox tells Kellerman about Falsone's questions, then drops hints to Falsone about her own budding suspicions.
81	4	"Subway"	Gary Fleder	James Yoshimura	December 5, 1997	604	10.32
A man falls off a subway platform and ends up pinned between its edge and an oncoming train. Pembleton and Bayliss are called to the scene and must treat it as a homicide, since the man will almost certainly die once he is pulled free. As Pembleton tries to keep his spirits up, Bayliss interviews the other people at the scene and finds not only that the man was pushed, but that the person who pushed him has a disturbing past. Meanwhile, Lewis and Falsone are dispatched to find the victim's girlfriend, out for a jog along the Inner Harbor, before his time runs out. Guest starring: Vincent D'Onofrio as John Lange
82	5	"Baby, It's You"	Ed Sherin	Jorge Zamacona	November 14, 1997	605	14.68
Prosecutors and detectives from two cities join forces on the case of a teenage girl who was raped in Baltimore and later found dead in New York City. As Munch, Falsone, Briscoe, and Curtis follow leads that point to her father, a dispute over jurisdiction ends with the trial being held in Baltimore – and Danvers and McCoy prosecuting it together. On the witness stand, the father offers a surprise alibi that sends the whole unit scrambling to either disprove it or find the actual killer. Falsone takes a personal interest in the case, since the victim's relationship with her parents reminds him of his love for his own son. Note: This episode concludes a crossover event that begins on Law & Order season 8 episode 6 "Baby, It's You". Guest starring: Jerry Orbach as NYPD Det. Lennie Briscoe, Benjamin Bratt as NYPD Det. Rey Curtis, Sam Waterston as New York E.A.D.A. Jack McCoy, Carey Lowell as New York A.D.A. Jamie Ross
83	6	"Birthday"	Alison Maclean	Julie Martin	November 7, 1997	606	9.47
When a woman is found sexually assaulted and beaten nearly to death - the third such attack in recent weeks - Falsone, Lewis, and Stivers are called in. Falsone works the case despite a shortage of evidence and Gee's insistence that it be handed over to Stivers and the sex crimes unit. His drive to prove himself gets the better of him, and Gee pulls him off the case for assaulting a suspect as it comes to a close. Now well past her pregnancy due date, Mary finally goes into labor and delivers the Pembletons' second child, Frank, Jr.., after an emergency Caesarean section. Georgia Rae Mahoney tells Kellerman that she has a videotape of Luther's death, recorded from surveillance cameras in his penthouse, and leaves Kellerman to wonder if she is about to ruin his life.
84	7	"Saigon Rose"	Nick Gomez	Eric Overmeyer	November 21, 1997	607	10.27
Pembleton and Lewis investigate a robbery/murder at a Vietnamese restaurant, in which one of the five victims is an off-duty cop. The only survivors are the family's two teenage children, who reluctantly give the detectives a tip leading to a second cop and her cousin. News that Georgia Rae Mahoney will not be prosecuted sparks a face-off between Falsone and Kellerman, with guns drawn; Kellerman later turns to Cox for advice on dealing with the fallout of the Mahoney shooting. Ballard is rushed to the hospital when she goes into shock after a crab dinner with Gharty. Cast: First appearance of Ellen McElduff as Billie Lou Hatfield
85	8	"All Is Bright"	Matt Reeves	Story by : Julie Martin & James Yoshimura; Teleplay by : Rafael Alvarez	December 12, 1997	608	10.77
Ballard and Gharty work the case of an HIV-positive man bludgeoned to death at a laundromat, with bleach poured down his throat. Questioning of the victim's many girlfriends leads the pair to a woman who killed him out of revenge for infecting her. One of Munch's ex-wives asks him for help planning her mother's funeral, but no one attends except for a paid mourner and author Peter Maas, who only wants to make sure she is dead. Falsone decides to sue his ex-wife for custody of his son, Kellerman tells Lewis about Georgia Rae's claim of having a videotape of the shooting, and Ballard has herself tested for HIV. Bayliss and Cox share a kiss during a Christmas party at the Waterfront. Guest starring: Carol Kane as Gwen Munch, Kathryn Erbe as Rita Hale, and Peter Maas as himself
86	9	"Closet Cases"	Leslie Libman & Larry Williams	Story by : James Yoshimura & Julie Martin; Teleplay by : Christopher Kyle	January 2, 1998	609	10.53
A man is found dressed in lingerie, beaten to death, and dumped behind a gay restaurant. As Pembleton and Bayliss determine that both the victim and his killer are gay, they are forced to confront their own attitudes about homosexuality. Bayliss accidentally brings his holiday relationship with Cox to a sudden halt, then goes out to dinner with the restaurant owner after the case is closed. After Kellerman meets with Lewis and Stivers to discuss Georgia Rae's videotape, he calls her bluff and learns that the tape does not exist, but she will still avenge Luther Mahoney's death. Falsone's attempt to discuss custody arrangements with his ex-wife quickly goes wrong. Guest starring: Peter Gallagher as Chris Rawls
87	10	"Sins of the Father"	Mary Harron	Story by : James Yoshimura & Julie Martin; Teleplay by : Darryl LeMont Wharton	January 9, 1998	610	10.68
A white man is found whipped and hanged in an empty house near a church that was a station on the Underground Railroad. Lewis and Falsone get a surprise from history as they work the case: the victim's ancestor, a notorious slave-catcher during the Civil War, kidnapped the killer's ancestor (a free black man) and sold him into slavery. Rumors about Bayliss' personal life begin to spread after Pembleton sees him have breakfast with Ballard following his dinner with the restaurant owner. Guest starring: Laurence Mason as Dennis Rigby
88	11	"Shaggy Dog, City Goat"	Kyle Secor	Eric Overmeyer	January 16, 1998	611	11.41
Cox entertains a gathering of medical examiners with a bizarre case worked by Munch and Kellerman: a man who jumped off a building only to be hit by a shotgun blast on the way down. Her job of deciding whether to classify the death as homicide or suicide gets more complicated with every new fact the detectives uncover. Georgia Rae files a $60 million wrongful-death lawsuit against everyone connected with the Mahoney shooting; when Lewis confronts and assaults her, Gee suspends him indefinitely. Ballard and Gharty call in Stivers for help on the murder of a drug dealer, then chase a pair of hillbilly suspects through Baltimore and into Allegany County. Falsone starts legal action to gain custody of his son. Guest starring: Steve Allen as George Cochran, Jayne Meadows as Emily Cochran. Note: The homicide that Munch, Kellerman and Cox are trying to solve in the episode is based on an urban legend, the fictional homicide case of Ronald Opus.
89	12	"Something Sacred"	Uli Edel	Anya Epstein	January 30, 1998	612	11.72
90	13	"Something Sacred"	Uli Edel	David Simon & Anya Epstein	January 30, 1998	613	11.72
The stabbing death of a priest in his own rectory becomes a red ball, with Ballard and Gharty in charge. Allegations of sexual abuse complicate the case, and the unit searches for two Guatemalan refugees who were living at the rectory. The detectives find the pair and take them into custody as material witnesses, sparking an outcry from the city's Catholics, and Barnfather overrides Gee and releases them. A potential lead on a suspect dries up, and Pembleton and Stivers - who has rotated into homicide from sex crimes - are called to the scene of a second priest's murder as the refugees go missing again. Falsone's custody hearing gets off to a rough start, and Kellerman worries about not having heard from Lewis since his suspension. As the red ball case continues, several detectives dress as priests and act as decoys to draw the killers out, without success. A gold chalice is found missing from the second murder scene; it soon turns up at a pawn shop, leading Ballard and Gharty to revisit the earlier lead and take a drug dealer into custody. Pembleton and Ballard take him on an impromptu tour of the morgue and the bay in order to get him to give up the killers as the two Guatemalans are picked up to be deported. Falsone runs into Lewis, who asks him for information on some of Georgia Rae's people. Upset at not having been told about Lewis' presence, a drunk Kellerman handcuffs and assaults a random man while hallucinating that he is Luther Mahoney. Guest starring: Michael Peña as Luis Carranza
91	14	"Lies and Other Truths"	Nick Gomez	Noel Behn	March 6, 1998	614	8.94
Pembleton and Bayliss are called to Fort Holabird, where they find the body of a man buried alive on the parade ground. The victim was a member of a small group of espionage enthusiasts, all but one of whom are quickly rounded up, but the full story only comes out when the last member barges into the squadroom wearing an explosive vest. Munch and Kellerman investigate a road-rage traffic accident in which the drivers of a passenger car and a state truck were killed. Cox faces pressure from her superiors to alter her autopsy report to show that the car driver was legally intoxicated and fend off a lawsuit from his widow; when she refuses and leaks the story to the press, she is fired and leaves town. Falsone loses the custody hearing concerning his son. Cast: Final appearance of C.M.E. Julianna Cox. Guest starring: John Glover as Nelson Broyles
92	15	"Pit Bull Sessions"	Barbara Kopple	Story by : Julie Martin & James Yoshimura; Teleplay by : Sean Whitesell	March 13, 1998	615	10.80
Pembleton and Falsone take the case of an elderly man who was mauled to death by his grandson's pit bulls, which had been trained for dogfighting. As they investigate and bring in the grandson, they find themselves at odds over his guilt and the uncomfortable truth that he cares for his dogs more than his family. Munch, Bayliss, Gharty, and Ballard get together at the Waterfront to reminisce about some of the dumbest criminals they have encountered. Stivers stuns Kellerman with news that Georgia Rae's wrongful-death suit will be heard by a jury; Kellerman becomes convinced that Gibbons, the presiding judge, is corrupt, but cannot get in to see him. Guest starring: Paul Giamatti as Harry Tjarks
93	16	"Mercy"	Alan Taylor	Eric Overmeyer	March 20, 1998	616	10.44
When a terminally ill man dies at home, his sister becomes convinced that his hospice doctor deliberately gave him a morphine overdose. Pembleton and Bayliss learn that the doctor may have a history of euthanizing her patients - with or without their consent - and grapple with their own attitudes about mortality. Ballard and Gharty finally bring in the suspects in the drug-dealer murder from "Shaggy Dog, City Goat", and Falsone and Stivers are deeply affected as they close a double shooting in which one of the victims is a 12-year-old girl. Kellerman shares with Lewis a recording of statements by Judge Gibbons that may constitute evidence of his corruption, but Lewis thinks Kellerman might not want to act on it. Gharty buys perfume for Billie Lou, the Waterfront's bartender. Guest starring: Alfre Woodard as Dr. Roxanne Turner, reprising her role from St. Elsewhere
94	17	"Abduction"	Kenneth Fink	Julie Martin & Anya Epstein	March 27, 1998	617	10.73
The entire homicide unit mobilizes, with Falsone as the primary, after a four-year-old boy disappears from a merry-go-round at the Inner Harbor. Gee calls on the public for help, first with a segment on the local news, then by allowing a national TV show that focuses on missing children to do a piece on the case. As the squad shifts from one suspect to another, a girl who was also on the ride helps bring the case to a close under hypnosis. Throughout, Falsone worries about his own son's safety and insists that his ex-wife keep a close eye on the boy.
95	18	"Full Court Press"	Clark Johnson	Story by : David Simon & Phillip B. Epstein; Teleplay by : Phillip B. Epstein	April 3, 1998	618	9.08
After a star high-school basketball player is found shot to death in his school's locker room, Munch and Gharty dig through the less appealing details of his life - including his habit of bullying other students - to find his killer. Pembleton and Bayliss try to close a week-old murder, but by accident their efforts instead allow the department to close down a major drug-smuggling operation. Ballard has trouble dealing with Kellerman's blasé attitude over the murder of a Mahoney drug dealer, the fifth such case in recent days; as five more are called in, Falsone asks Lewis if he has been using the files Falsone provided to start a civil war among the ranks. Kellerman is surprised to learn that the FBI is investigating Judge Gibbons for corruption. Guest starring: Steve Burns as David Tarnofski
96	19	"Strangled, Not Stirred"	Jay Tobias	Story by : Julie Martin & Anya Epstein; Teleplay by : Linda McGibney	April 10, 1998	619	9.55
Ballard and Gharty investigate the death of a young single woman who was found shocked with a stun gun and strangled with her own pantyhose. A second such victim is soon found, leading the pair to a husband and wife who accuse each other of not just these two murders, but three more in other cities. A spate of anonymous tips on the Mahoney-related cases allows the detectives to close all of them. Falsone realizes that the information in those tips had to have come from Lewis, who learns from Gee that Barnfather is trying to get him transferred out of homicide and CID.
97	20	"Secrets"	Ed Bianchi	Yaphet Kotto	April 17, 1998	620	9.96
Two prominent business executives are found dead within hours of each other. Although the deaths turn out to be suicides, the detectives uncover evidence pointing to a blackmailer who had threatened to expose the victims' most lurid activities. The case becomes even more complicated after the blackmailer is found murdered. Two high-ranking Mahoney associates are shot dead, leading the detectives to realize that the civil war in Georgia Rae's ranks has gotten out of control. As Lewis returns to duty, Kellerman watches Judge Gibbons surprise everyone by dismissing Georgia Rae's lawsuit. Afterward, he publicly calls Gibbons out on the corruption charges and urges him to give up Georgia Rae. Bayliss privately hints to Ballard that he may be bisexual.
98	21	"Finnegan's Wake"	Steve Buscemi	Story by : David Simon & James Yoshimura; Teleplay by : David Mills	April 24, 1998	621	11.33
An old man wanders into the squadroom claiming to know who killed a young girl in 1932 - the oldest unsolved murder in BPD history. Falsone takes the case and visits Thomas Finnegan, a long-retired detective who was the last officer to investigate it. As they pursue the new lead, Finnegan charms the unit with stories from his years on the job but also unsettles them by displaying the prejudices of that past time. The case bears many similarities to the murder of Adena Watson, and Bayliss struggles not to let either of them haunt his mind. Guest starring: Charles Durning as Thomas Finnegan
99	22	"Fallen Heroes, Part 1"	Kathryn Bigelow	Story by : Eric Overmyer; Teleplay by : Lois Johnson	May 1, 1998	622	9.89
Judge Gibbons is stabbed to death outside the courthouse, and Pembleton and Bayliss quickly establish that the killer is Junior Bunk. When they bring him in, though, they are surprised to find that he has developed a tough new attitude and is not about to give up Georgia Rae. Falsone and Stivers investigate the drive-by shooting death of a parole officer and find two parties involved: an ex-con he was hassling, and Aloyisus "Pony" Johnson, a double murderer who had been sent to prison five years earlier. (See "A Dog and Pony Show", season 1.) With everyone in the squadroom briefly distracted, Junior Bunk grabs a gun from a desk and opens fire, wounding Ballard and Gharty and killing three uniformed officers before the detectives kill him in turn. Gee mobilizes the entire department to bring down Georgia Rae. Guest starring: Mekhi Phifer as Junior Bunk
100	23	"Fallen Heroes, Part 2"	Kathryn Bigelow	Story by : James Yoshimura; Teleplay by : Joy Lusco	May 8, 1998	623	12.24
The BPD starts a citywide sweep to bring in every Mahoney crew member, with the goal of arresting Georgia Rae. Stivers tells Gee that the Mahoney shooting did not occur as it was reported. The detectives find Georgia Rae dead, killed by her own people, and Bayliss takes a bullet to protect Pembleton from a shooter. As he is rushed into surgery and Gharty and Ballard recover from theirs, Gee tells Pembleton to find out what really happened. He and Falsone interrogate Lewis and then Kellerman, who finally admits Luther Mahoney had not been aiming a gun at anyone when Kellerman shot and killed him. Kellerman and Pembleton both resign from the BPD - the former to keep Lewis and Stivers from losing their jobs and avoid a trial, the latter out of disgust at Kellerman's actions and the cover-up, and guilt for letting his partner down. Cast: Final regular appearances of Det. Frank Pembleton, and Det. Mike Kellerman.
