= Finnegan's Wake (Homicide: Life on the Street) =

- Homicide: Life on the Street episode
- Episode no.: Season 6 Episode 21
- Directed by: Steve Buscemi
- Story by: David Simon; James Yoshimura
- Teleplay by: David Mills
- Cinematography by: Alex Zakrzewski
- Production code: 621
- Original air date: April 24, 1998

Guest appearance
- Charles Durning as Det. Thomas Finnegan

Episode chronology
← Previous "Secrets"	Next → "Fallen Heroes: Part 1"
- Homicide: Life on the Street season 6

"Finnegan's Wake" is the 21st episode of the sixth season of the American police drama television series Homicide: Life on the Street. It is the 98th overall episodes of the series, and originally aired on NBC in the United States on April 24, 1998.

The episode was directed by Steve Buscemi, who had previously appeared in the series as sociopathic gunman Gordon Pratt. "Finnegan's Wake" continues a storyline introduced in the very first episode of the series: Tim Bayliss's obsession with the Adena Watson case. Guest star Charles Durning was nominated for an Emmy Award for Outstanding Guest Actor In A Drama Series for his portrayal of Thomas Finnegan.

== Plot summary ==
An old man wanders into the homicide squad room, claiming to have information on the 1932 death of a young girl named Clara Slone - the oldest unsolved murder in department history. The squad reopens the case with Tim Bayliss as the initial primary detective, but its similarity to the Adena Watson case — Bayliss' first as the primary, which still haunts him — motivates Lt. Al Giardello to reassign the case to Paul Falsone, who is thrilled by the opportunity to close a case that is a part of Baltimore history. Falsone gets permission from Giardello to partner with Thomas Finnegan, a detective who had investigated the murder when it occurred and who remained obsessed with it until he retired in 1974.

Finnegan eagerly steps up to help Falsone solve the case. He initially charms the entire unit with his mixture of charisma, Irish tradition, and professionalism, although his nostalgia for the days when Baltimore police were mostly Irish eventually offends Meldrick Lewis when Finnegan refers to black suspects with the racial slur "spooks." His derisive comments about Italians and women serving in the department irritate Falsone and Laura Ballard as well. However, Finnegan also persuades a dive team to keep searching a particular area until they find a revolver that proves to be the murder weapon.

Falsone and Finnegan are declared heroes when they eventually close the case, and Falsone takes great pride in writing Slone's name on the Board in blue ink as a cold case that has been solved. The happy ending is bitter for both Bayliss (who is again haunted by memories and nightmares of the Adena Watson case) and Lewis (who is left disturbed by Finnegan's racism). Bayliss does, however, find some comfort in visiting Slone's younger sister with Finnegan in order to tell her that the case has been solved.
