= Mike Kellerman =

Detective Mike Kellerman
- Detective Mike Kellerman
- First appearance: October 20, 1995 (4x01, Fire (Part 1))
- Last appearance: May 8, 1998 (6x23, Fallen Heroes (2)) (Regular); December 11, 1998 (7x09, Kellerman P.I. (2)) (Guest); February 13, 2000; Homicide: The Movie
- Created by: Tom Fontana
- Portrayed by: Reed Diamond

In-universe information
- Nicknames: Mikey; Kellermyster
- Gender: Male
- Title: Detective
- Occupation: Private Investigator; Homicide Detective (formerly); Arson Detective (formerly)
- Family: unnamed mother; unnamed father; unnamed sister; Drew (brother); Greg (brother)
- Significant others: Anne Kennedy (wife, divorced); CME Julianna Cox (Season 5)
- Nationality: American

Detective Michael Scott Kellerman is a fictional character on the television drama series Homicide: Life on the Street portrayed by Reed Diamond. He is a main character from seasons 4–6 (1995–98).

== Biography ==
Kellerman was born on July 20, 1966, in Baltimore to working class parents, the youngest of three sons. His father works at a distillery. He also has a sister who, by the time of the series, lived in St. Louis. He graduated from high school in 1984. He always wanted to be a cop and was a "good kid", quite different from his brothers Drew (Eric Stoltz) and Greg (Tate Donovan), who were always getting into trouble. Drew and Greg ended up drifting through much of the United States, occasionally turning up in Baltimore to ask for money. They appeared in the fifth season episode "Wu's On First?" on the run from two bookies, owing a gambling debt to one and having stolen a Babe Ruth uniform from the other. They were estranged from their father, who referred to them as "hoodlums". Kellerman had recently been divorced from a crime lab technician named Anne Kennedy prior to his joining the homicide unit. Kellerman would later confide with Meldrick Lewis that Anne had cheated on him.

Kellerman worked his way up through the Baltimore Police Department, eventually landing in the Arson unit. When a pair of teenagers were killed in a series of warehouse fires, Kellerman was called in to help with the subsequent homicide investigation. With the squad short three men (Stanley Bolander and Beau Felton on suspension, Steve Crosetti dead by suicide), Lieutenant Al Giardello offered Kellerman a transfer to Homicide, having been impressed with his work on the cases. Although he initially refused the transfer, his father's statement that he works at the distillery because he's never done anything he wasn't already good at led him to accept the move to Homicide. Kellerman was partnered with Meldrick Lewis, with whom he would work during most of his time with the squad. Kellerman also crossed paths with Luther Mahoney and became determined to take down the drug kingpin after Mahoney arranged for the assassination of an intelligent, introspective, and tired-of-the-game drug dealer who had had a chance to kill Kellerman but chose to let him live.

== Corruption scandal ==
Early in the fifth season, a federal grand jury was gathered to investigate corrupt cops in the arson unit, including Kellerman. He was confined to desk duty during this time, which greatly angered him because he felt it marked him as guilty. He had, in fact, been the only one of four officers investigated who had not taken money from a pair of arsonists (Matthew Roland and his son, Mitchell). Giardello went to BPD Commissioner James C. Harris on Kellerman's behalf, only to learn that no help would be coming from the upper levels of the BPD's command structure – due to a combination of political motivation and Harris' personal dislike of Giardello. Kellerman refused to testify against his fellow cops, but was not indicted; the U.S. Attorney in charge of the investigation later told him that she saw him as a good cop trying to do his job, but did not understand why good cops would choose not to turn in bad ones. Despite not being indicted, Kellerman became convinced that no one within or outside the BPD would ever believe that he was not corrupt. Falling into intense depression and reeling from another case of Luther Mahoney getting away with murder, Kellerman became increasingly angry and almost committed suicide. Lewis managed to calm him down and take his gun, after which Kellerman took some time off.

During his confinement to desk duty, Kellerman met the new medical examiner, Dr. Julianna Cox, who had just lost her father. They consoled each other with a one-night stand, then developed a rough-edged, informal relationship that continued until Cox was fired and left Baltimore in the sixth season. Before leaving, she hinted to Kellerman that she might have decided to stay in the city if they had been able to form a real relationship.

== The Luther Mahoney Shooting ==
Kellerman and Lewis were put in charge of a string of murders linked with drug kingpin and crime lord Luther Mahoney (Erik Todd Dellums). Innocents and gangbangers alike fell because of Mahoney, but there was never enough evidence to prosecute him for any of the crimes.

Eventually, a drug mule who had been transporting heroin from overseas was discovered dead in his motel room after one of the heroin-laden condoms in his stomach burst. The police decided to swap the shipment with fake heroin, leading to a huge upset in his industry. Mahoney was monitored going to a meeting with one of his lieutenants—a meeting where he executed the lieutenant and inadvertently shot a bystander before speeding off.

Lewis pursued, and Kellerman and Narcotics Detective Terri Stivers hopped in a vehicle moments later. They sped back to Mahoney's condominium and stormed in to find a disarmed Lewis on the ground, facing his own gun in Mahoney's hand. Kellerman gave three warnings, and Mahoney lowered, but did not drop, the gun. Kellerman began to recite the Miranda Rights, only getting as far as "You have the right to remain silent" before he shot Mahoney once, executing him. The detectives wrote up the incident as if Mahoney had had the gun raised, and the shooting was eventually ruled clean.

While Kellerman convinced himself that what he did was justified, Stivers was not so convinced, and Lewis eventually came to doubt it as well. Mahoney's empire was salvaged by his sister Georgia Rae (Hazelle Goodman), who was convinced that Kellerman had murdered her brother and sought revenge, initially attempting to blackmail Kellerman with non-existent video footage of the shooting (through which she was convinced that Kellerman had killed her brother in cold blood) and eventually deciding to sue the city through the help of a corrupt judge, Gerald Gibbons (Rick Warner), on her payroll. Kellerman later learned that Gibbons was being investigated by the FBI, and after the judge dismissed the lawsuit, Kellerman publicly called him out and urged him to give up Georgia Rae.

== Fallout ==
Gibbons was found stabbed to death shortly afterward, with evidence pointing to Georgia Rae's son, Nathaniel Lee "Junior Bunk" Mahoney (Mekhi Phifer). Junior Bunk was brought in for questioning, but refused to implicate his mother. While waiting to make a phone call, he seized a weapon from a desk drawer and started a firefight in the Homicide squadroom. Although he was ultimately shot dead by Bayliss, Lewis, Kellerman, and Giardello, Detectives Gharty and Ballard were injured and three uniformed officers were killed. The police went out in force, and Bayliss subsequently took a bullet to the ribcage while shielding Pembleton from a shooter. Georgia Rae was eventually found dead, killed by her own people. After Stivers told Giardello that the Mahoney shooting was not as it seemed, Giardello directed Detective Frank Pembleton to find the truth. Pembleton and fellow detective Paul Falsone interrogated Lewis and then Kellerman, who eventually admitted that Mahoney had lowered the gun before being killed.

Giardello then offered Kellerman a choice. He could face a jury trial and possibly win, but he, Lewis, and Stivers would certainly be fired once their false reports came to light; or he could resign and the other two could keep their jobs. Kellerman resigned and later became a private investigator, as seen in Season 7, but lost the respect of most of the squad. In his new work, Kellerman found himself opposed to his old coworkers when he worked to aid in the defense of a pair of teenagers who committed infanticide. In the end, however, Kellerman got to the truth and redeemed himself in the eyes of some of his former coworkers, particularly Falsone, by anonymously providing them with information that boosted their case, even though it was not enough to prosecute. For most of this story, Falsone referred to Kellerman in an angry way and used his last name, but in their last conversation implied that Kellerman had slipped them the information and in perhaps a sort of redemption, calls him "Detective".

While testifying on behalf of one of the teenagers mentioned above, Kellerman explained the use of "The Board" – the dry-erase board in the squadroom that served as a record of detectives' open and solved cases.

== The TV movie ==
In the Homicide TV movie, Kellerman was one of the many former unit members to rally around when Lt. Giardello was shot down. While the other detectives didn't shun him, he told Mike that he would be better off only working with him to prevent any new conflicts between himself and his former co-workers. As they investigated possible connections in Baltimore's Italian quarter, Mike resorted to violence tactics while Kellerman stood guard. However, Mike's rage eventually proved too strong when he pulled a gun on an elderly man and Kellerman had to talk him down. Kellerman was last seen in the Waterfront, drinking with ex-M.E. Julianna Cox, who had also come down to help in the investigation.
