= Julianna Cox =

Fictional character in the TV show Homicide: Life on the Street

M.E. Julianna Cox
- M.E. Julianna Cox
- First appearance: November 1, 1996 (5x05, "M.E., Myself and I")
- Last appearance: March 6, 1998 (6x14, "Lies and Other Truths") (HLOTS); February 13, 2000; Homicide: The Movie
- Created by: Tom Fontana
- Portrayed by: Michelle Forbes

In-universe information
- Nickname: Julie C.
- Gender: Female
- Occupation: Chief Medical Examiner (Formerly)
- Significant other: Mike Kellerman

Julianna Cox is a fictional character in the TV show Homicide: Life on the Street for seasons 5 and 6, played by actress Michelle Forbes.

Cox was introduced in the season five episode "M.E., Myself, and I," returning to her hometown to take a position as the chief medical examiner (M.E.), after two years at the morgue in Buffalo. Her father is in frail health and barely hanging on. He dies within days of her arriving, devastating her; while it is first implied that he has died of natural causes, she later reveals that he died from injuries sustained in a car crash caused by a drunk driver. She compensates for her sadness, stating that "sometimes I drive too fast... sometimes I drink too much... sometimes I fall madly in love with the wrong man".

As the chief M.E., Cox distinguished herself by being much more friendly and personable with the homicide unit than her predecessor. The detectives were all impressed that she would actually make trips to see them once in a while, both on and off duty, and she was very good at her job. She did not tolerate sloppy work or incompetence, and she fired two of her staff members - one who deliberately misclassified a prostitute's murder as a drug overdose, and a second who stole jewelry from several homicide victims. She was also a regular at the Waterfront Bar.

Cox was immediately attracted to Det. Mike Kellerman during a time when he was under investigation for corruption and sidelined from active duty. Both in need of comfort, they had a one-night stand that turned into a very open, laid-back sort of pseudo-relationship which mostly consisted of them getting drunk and having sex. The relationship eventually went downhill fast, however, and they distanced themselves. Cox briefly had a relationship with Det. Tim Bayliss, although she later admitted that it was mostly wanting someone over the holidays, and she angrily ended the relationship when he returned a pair of earrings to her in front of everyone at a crime scene.

Towards the end of the sixth season, a truck driver working for the city ran a passenger car off the road, killing both the car driver and himself and leaving the car driver's wife quadriplegic. Facing a multimillion-dollar lawsuit, the city pressured Cox to alter the evidence and report that the car driver was legally intoxicated; her tests had shown that the man had alcohol in his system but was not over the legal limit. Cox refused to lie and was fired, hearing later that the city had to pay the wife a $45 million settlement. She said goodbye to Kellerman and lamented that they had never put together a real relationship, implying she would have stayed around if they had.

After losing her job, Cox leaves Baltimore. She returns in Homicide: The Movie to help the detectives catch a man who tried to assassinate Al Giardello, who had been their shift commander during the series.

== See also ==
- List of fictional medical examiners
