= The Jury (TV series) =

- Genre: Legal drama
- Created by: James Yoshimura; Tom Fontana; Barry Levinson
- Starring: Billy Burke; Adam Busch; Anna Friel; Cote de Pablo; Jeff Hephner; Shalom Harlow
- Composer: Blue Man Group
- Country of origin: United States
- Original language: English
- No. of seasons: 1
- No. of episodes: 10

Production
- Executive producers: James Yoshimura; Tom Fontana; Barry Levinson; Jim Finnerty
- Producer: Irene Burns
- Running time: 44 minutes
- Production companies: The Levinson/Fontana Company; MarlJim Productions; HBO Independent Productions; 20th Century Fox Television

Original release
- Network: Fox
- Release: June 8 – August 6, 2004

The Jury is an American legal drama television series that aired on Fox from June 8 to August 6, 2004. Each week, in the same New York City courtroom, a new 12-person jury deliberates over a criminal case. Each episode begins at the start of jury deliberations; the trial is recounted through flashbacks.

Fox announced the series' cancellation in July 2004 due to low ratings, but all ten episodes were aired.

== Cast ==
=== Main ===
- Billy Burke as Attorney John Ranguso
- Adam Busch as Steve Dixson
- Anna Friel as Attorney Megan Delaney
- Cote de Pablo as Marguerite Cisneros
- Jeff Hephner as Attorney Keenan O'Brien
- Shalom Harlow as Attorney Melissa Greenfield

=== Recurring ===
- Barry Levinson as Judge Horatio Hawthorne
- Patrice O'Neal as Adam Walker

== Episodes ==
| No. | Title | Directed by | Written by | Original release date | Prod. code |
|---|---|---|---|---|---|
| 1 | "Three Boys and a Gun" | Ed Bianchi | Teleplay by : Jason Yoshimura; Story by : James Yoshimura & Tom Fontana | June 8, 2004 | 1AJP02 |
Tempers flare as the jurors determine whether a teenager committed a premeditated murder against a rival on the basketball court, or was simply careless as he celebrated New Year's Eve with friends by firing his father's gun from the rooftop of his apartment.
| 2 | "The Honeymoon Suite" | Barry Levinson | Teleplay by : Bradford Winters; Story by : Tom Fontana & James Yoshimura | June 8, 2004 | 1AJP01 |
The jury is charged with deciding whether a teenage girl was murdered by her boyfriend, or was a willing participant in an incomplete double suicide pact.
| 3 | "Mail Order Mystery" | Jean de Segonzac | Teleplay by : Adam Rapp; Story by : Tom Fontana & James Yoshimura | June 15, 2004 | 1AJP03 |
Greenfield presents a credible case for reasonable doubt in her defense of a man accused of the murder of his mail order bride.
| 4 | "Bangers" | Ted Bogosian | Tom Fontana & James Yoshimura | June 22, 2004 | 1AJP04 |
Hawthorne urges both sides to come to a swift plea agreement after he learns that gangbangers have intimidated the jurors deciding the fate of two of their members on trial for murdering a woman who opposed their drug dealing in her apartment building; Walker's dark mood during the case is explained when he reveals a painful incident from his past to Dixon.
| 5 | "Last Rites" | Alex Zakrzewski | Teleplay by : Bradford Winters & Jason Yoshimura; Story by : Tom Fontana & James Yoshimura | June 29, 2004 | 1AJP07 |
The jury weighs whether a inmate's grudge prompted him to kill the prison chaplain during a riot, or if his arrest was set up by a fellow inmate and correctional officers.
| 6 | "Memories" | Jake Paltrow | Teleplay by : Julie Martin; Story by : James Yoshimura & Tom Fontana | July 9, 2004 | 1AJP05 |
The jury debates whether they can rely upon the memory and the testimony of a little girl in determining if she was molested by her neighbor.
| 7 | "The Boxer" | Jean de Segonzac | Teleplay by : James Yoshimura; Story by : Tom Fontana & James Yoshimura | July 16, 2004 | 1AJP09 |
The jury must determine if the evidence of a contentious relationship and a hat left at the scene is enough to convict a boxer of the death of his manager.
| 8 | "Pilot" | Barry Levinson | Teleplay by : James Yoshimura & Tom Fontana; Story by : Tom Fontana & James Yoshimura & Barry Levinson | July 23, 2004 | 1AJP79 |
The jury must decide if a highly decorated police officer is guilty of vehicular manslaughter in the hit-and-run death of a homeless man even though there are no witnesses that can place him at the scene, and no damage to his vehicle.
| 9 | "Lamentation on the Reservation" | Clark Johnson | Teleplay by : Kia Corthron; Story by : James Yoshimura & Tom Fontana | July 30, 2004 | 1AJP08 |
The jury examines the possible motives of romantic jealousy, greed, politics, business conflicts, and revenge in determining whether a woman is guilty of soliciting the murder of her business partner and lover.
| 10 | "Too Jung to Die" | David Von Ancken | Teleplay by : Willie Reale; Story by : James Yoshimura & Tom Fontana | August 6, 2004 | 1AJP06 |
The jury has a great deal of difficulty in determining whether a psychiatrist attempted to murder a woman who claims they had a sexual relationship while she was his patient.
