= Mike Giardello =

- Special Agent Mike Giardello
- First appearance: September 25, 1998 (7x01, "La Famiglia")
- Last appearance: May 21, 1999 (7x22, Forgive Us Our Trespasses); February 13, 2000; Homicide: The Movie
- Created by: Tom Fontana
- Portrayed by: Giancarlo Esposito

In-universe information
- Nickname: Mike
- Gender: Male
- Title: Officer; Agent (formerly)
- Occupation: Patrolman; FBI Agent (formerly)
- Family: Al Giardello (father); Joanne Giardello (mother, deceased); Teresa (sister); Charisse (sister)
- Relatives: Rosina Giardello (great-grandmother); Al (nephew)

Alphonso Michael Giardello Jr. is a fictional character from the television drama Homicide: Life on the Street. The character was played by Giancarlo Esposito.

== Biography ==
Mike Giardello is an FBI agent who is the estranged son of Baltimore Police Lieutenant Al Giardello. He comes to Baltimore from Arizona when a relative is killed to assist the BPD in their investigations. He applies for and gets a job as a liaison to the Homicide unit. Although his FBI resources often help the unit's cases, he and his father often clash over media leaks; in one case, Mike's decision to give case information to his FBI superiors leads to the death of a key witness in a politically charged murder investigation. Later, he is called in to engage in hostage negotiations with a man who is holding his son and daughter at gunpoint; the man ultimately kills the boy and then himself, leaving Mike devastated. He quits the FBI in disgust after his inquiries into the death of a Baltimore resident result in the killer – a mobster in Witness Protection – being offered a lenient plea deal because he is needed to testify at a major trial. In the series finale he talks of returning to the Baltimore streets, and the 2000 TV movie reveals that he has joined the BPD as a patrolman in hopes of earning a detective's shield.

== Family ==
Mike Giardello appears as the middle child of Al and Joanne Giardello. He has two sisters Teresa and Charisse (who refers to him as Al Jr.) and at least one nephew by his sister Charisse. His great-grandmother Rosina is known to him as "Nonna". He was raised in Baltimore's Little Italy. Michael tends to have an estranged relationship with his father at first but is improved upon when he becomes an FBI liaison to the department. Michael remains proud of Al however mainly due to his accomplishments in blazing trails for African American officers in the BPD (Michael claims Al was one of the first black Lieutenants in the department and encourages Al to take the captain's position on the finale as a means of improving the bad relationship between the city's black community and the police department).
