= Paul Falsone =

Detective Paul Falsone
- Falsone, Season 7
- First appearance: May 9, 1997 (5x21, Partners and Other Strangers) (Guest); October 17, 1997 (6x01, Blood Ties (part 1)" (Regular)
- Last appearance: May 21, 1999 (7x22, Forgive Us Our Trespasses) (HLOTS); February 13, 2000; Homicide: The Movie
- Created by: Tom Fontana
- Portrayed by: Jon Seda

In-universe information
- Gender: Male
- Title: Detective
- Occupation: Homicide Detective; Auto Squad Detective (formerly)
- Spouse: Janine (divorced)
- Significant other: Laura Ballard (Season 7)
- Children: Daniel Falsone (son)
- Nationality: American

Paul Falsone is a fictional character in Homicide: Life on the Street, portrayed by Jon Seda. He is a police detective of the Baltimore Police Department. Born on October 14, 1968, Falsone was introduced as a long-time member of the Auto Squad at the end of Season 5, where his natural talents proved useful in solving vehicle-related crimes. However, when the department began a rotation program, in which detectives would be periodically reassigned to new units, Falsone was transferred to the homicide shift commanded by Al Giardello. After three months, Giardello expressed satisfaction with Falsone's work and requested that he remain with the unit.

Falsone first appears in the Season 5 finale episodes "Partners and Other Strangers" and "Strangers and Other Partners," then becomes a regular character in the Season 6 premiere "Blood Ties." He and his partner, Det. Meldrick Lewis, are shot at by Junior Bunk on behalf of the crime organization run by Georgia Rae Mahoney. Falsone's investigation leads to a suspicion that the shooting of Georgia Rae's brother Luther (the original head of the organization) was not legitimate, a suspicion which ignites a long-standing enmity between Falsone and Mike Kellerman, the detective who shot Luther during the previous season.

His son Daniel was born in December 1993. He and his girlfriend Janine got married shortly after she discovered that she was pregnant with Daniel.

He was from New Jersey. He joined the Baltimore Police Department in 1991. He became a detective in 1994. In 1997, he earned a total of $32,000. After becoming a homicide detective, he received a raise of $2,000.

He was raised Catholic, but lapsed as an adult. His father had died by 1998.

Despite Falsone's tough-guy demeanor, he is often shown to have an affection for children, especially his own son, who is the focus of a bitter custody battle between Falsone and his ex-wife.

In the Season 6 episode "Finnegan's Wake," he plays a key role in solving the oldest open homicide case in departmental history, the 1932 murder of an eight-year-old girl.

During Season 7, Falsone begins dating fellow homicide detective Laura Ballard, who joined the unit at roughly the same time that he rotated into it. In the episode "Bones of Contention", Giardello warns Falsone about the regulations against intimate fraternization among members of the same shift, and Falsone and Ballard agree to stop seeing each other rather than risk discipline or a forced transfer out of Giardello's shift. However, this agreement merely led to their continuing their relationship in secret.

The character also appeared in the Law & Order episode "Baby, It's You".
