= Tim Bayliss =

- First appearance: January 31, 1993 (1x01, "Gone for Goode")
- Last appearance: May 21, 1999 (7x22, "Forgive Us Our Trespasses") (HLOTS); February 13, 2000; Homicide: The Movie
- Created by: Tom Fontana
- Portrayed by: Kyle Secor

In-universe information
- Gender: Male
- Title: Detective
- Occupation: Homicide Detective
- Family: Virginia Bayliss (mother)
- Relatives: George (uncle); Jim (cousin); Kurt (cousin; deceased); Unnamed Sibling; Unnamed Niece

Timothy Bayliss is a fictional character on Homicide: Life on the Street, played by Kyle Secor and one of the few main characters to last the entire run of the show. He was loosely based on real-life Baltimore homicide detective Thomas Pellegrini, featured in David Simon's book Homicide: A Year on the Killing Streets, though Pellegrini was reportedly not a fan of his fictional alter ego. The character also appeared in the Law & Order episode "Charm City".

== Childhood and early life ==
Born on May 31, 1960, in Baltimore, Maryland, Bayliss had a difficult and often contentious relationship with his family. Growing up he was very close with his cousins Jim and Kurt. In Season 3, after Jim shot and killed a Turkish exchange student, Bayliss tried to shoehorn himself into his partner Frank Pembleton's investigation. Pembleton learned that Kurt was killed during the Persian Gulf War and that Kurt and Jim's father was racist. The case went to a grand jury, which voted not to indict Jim. In Season 4, Bayliss briefly mentioned having a six-year-old niece. His undergraduate minor was in drama.

In Season 5, Bayliss revealed to Pembleton that he had been molested as a child by one of his uncles. When he told his father what had happened, the elder Bayliss accused him of lying and the relationship remained hostile until his father's death. Bayliss told Det. Meldrick Lewis that he was once arrested for protesting U.S. policy in El Salvador when he was a teenager, a story idea that Secor reportedly disdained as out of character for Bayliss. It was quickly discarded in favor of the character developments for Seasons 5–7, including his abuse history and religious journey.

== Religion ==
Unlike several characters in the series, religion was not important in Bayliss's family background. When asked, he stated he had been raised "mutt." In this case that meant his family attended several different denominations, most of which could be termed "Mainline Protestant," but they had no attachment to any of them. Bayliss states that he was baptized into the Presbyterian Church and confirmed in the Episcopal Church. He briefly joined Unitarian Universalism for a girlfriend, but seems to have not been particularly sincere about it. He converted to Buddhism in the final season but eventually lost faith.

== Adena Watson case ==
After serving on the mayor's security detail for two years, Bayliss transfers into the homicide unit, regarding it as a place for "thinking cops" who are the elite of the police department. His first case as primary is the rape-murder of a young girl named Adena Watson, which goes unsolved over the entire series run. The case haunts him, particularly during the first four seasons; Frank Pembleton (Andre Braugher), Bayliss' partner, scolds him for putting too much of himself into his cases. The two put their prime suspect, an arabber named Risley Tucker (Moses Gunn), through a long interrogation but are unable to elicit a confession. In the Season 4 episode "Stakeout," set long after the case has gone cold, Bayliss learns that Tucker has died of natural causes.

The Season 4 episode "Requiem for Adena" centers on the murder of a young black girl that shows similarities to the Watson case. Bayliss becomes obsessed with the idea that the two cases are connected, to the point that his actions begin to jeopardize Pembleton's efforts to get a confession. He learns that many of the people connected with Adena and/or Tucker have moved on from her death much better than he has, and states that he has begun to hate Adena because he cannot do so himself. At the end of the episode, he takes a framed photo of her from his desk (where it had stood ever since that investigation wound down), packs it into an envelope with a carnation from his lapel, and drops the envelope into a trash can.

In the Season 6 episode "Finnegan's Wake," Bayliss wrestles anew with the Watson case when he learns about the oldest unsolved homicide on the BPD's books, the 1932 murder of an eight-year-old girl named Clara Slone. Pembleton tells Bayliss that the senior detectives all decided not to tell him about it because of its similarities to the Watson case, most notably the fact that a young officer assigned to the case quickly saw it spiral out of control and remained obsessed with it until he retired over 40 years later. The Slone case is given to Paul Falsone (Jon Seda) due to Bayliss' trouble in confronting it; after it is closed, Bayliss wonders if he let a truly evil man (Tucker) get away.

== Partnership with Pembleton ==
The partnership with Frank Pembleton would form a core element to the character and the entire show. Pembleton was by turns supportive and hurtful to Bayliss. He wanted to take a hard line on Bayliss's cousin who killed a Turkish exchange student, and also said that Bayliss lacked an understanding of "his dark side" so would do poorly in his job. Yet Pembleton also saved Bayliss from being charged in an incident that could have been interpreted as robbery, and once told him that he was the only person he trusted other than his wife, Mary. While Pembleton saw the world in strict black and white terms, Bayliss was far more open to accepting the shades of gray present in police work.

That said, the two ended their partnership for a time in the fifth season, partly due to Pembleton suffering a stroke. Bayliss stated that Frank's rhythm was "off" after recovery, but there were also hints that he had come to prefer working without him. In addition, he felt uncomfortable with Pembleton after he told him how he (Bayliss) was sexually abused in childhood. The case in the episode featuring his admission ("Betrayal") involved a mother who allowed her boyfriend to beat her daughter from a previous marriage and was pregnant with the new boyfriend's child; Pembleton showed some sympathy to the woman's story, while Bayliss repeatedly and forcefully berated the woman for her reluctance to stop the ultimately fatal abuse. Later, he returned to partnering with Pembleton due to Mary leaving Pembleton for a time. While working on a case in which a teenage girl murdered the stepfather who beat her mother, the two had very different views: while Pembleton is far more sympathetic to her, Bayliss is determined to see her charged with murder. Pembleton sees Tim's personal involvement and assures him that it is not his fault that he was abused. Following his stroke, Bayliss treats Pembleton in the same cold manner, often refusing to listen to his theories and indifferent to any attempts Pembleton made towards repairing their relationship, although this animosity had all but disappeared by the end of the fifth and start of the sixth season.

Pembleton left the force shortly after Bayliss was shot by a member of Georgia Rae Mahoney's gang in a gun battle. Pembleton met Bayliss's mother, Virginia, while Tim recovered from surgery. She told Frank what Tim thought of their friendship: "He thinks the world of you. He says you're his friend. He says you're not a person who has friends, but he's your friend." Shortly afterwards, Pembleton and Mary say a prayer for Tim, during which Pembleton is visibly distraught (something he is almost never shown to be in the course of the show) and refers to Tim as his friend.

== Personal life ==
In the first two seasons, Bayliss's character had been called a "fair-haired choir boy" and he stated once that he rejected the idea of having sex for any reason besides love. That started hints at having him "lose his innocence," or questions of whether his claimed innocence was even genuine, occurred even then. Starting in the third season, the show's producers stated they wanted to more explicitly have him "lose his innocence." Hence in season three he had an affair with crime scene specialist Emma Zoole, who liked having sex in a coffin. She later broke up with him because he "wouldn't fight with her." The statement had something of a double meaning as it directly involved his unwillingness to argue with her about their problems, but other aspects of the character implied she also was referring to his disdain for rough sex. The end of the relationship led to his pulling a gun on a store clerk in an irrational rage.

In later seasons he explored bisexuality. He did not "come out," in the standard sense, until season 7. In the first episode concerning the matter he flatly stated he was "not gay" and did not formally declare himself to be bisexual until Season 7, but even then he did not want to be deemed "a crusader" on the matter. This way of treating his sexuality is believed to have made the network uncomfortable. He had a fling with Dr. Cox and a semi-flirtation with Det. Ballard, a dinner date with gay restaurant owner Chris Rawls, and briefly dated a closeted uniform cop, but had no serious relationships in the final seasons of the show.

During Season 6, Bayliss and Pembleton partnered again, and a drug war sparked by the killing of Baltimore drug kingpin Luther Mahoney led to brutal retaliation against the police department, including Mahoney's nephew, in custody, getting hold of an officer's gun and shooting up the squad room. Bayliss was among the detectives who shot down the gunman, and accompanied Pembleton and other members of the unit in carrying out the ensuing police response. During a gun battle, Pembleton froze when confronted by a suspect and Bayliss, who shoved him aside, was shot and severely wounded. Pembleton, disgusted to find that fellow detective Mike Kellerman had deliberately shot Mahoney and would resign instead of being prosecuted, as well as grief-stricken over Bayliss's wounding, quit the force in disgust in the season finale. Bayliss would return for Season 7, forever changed and foreshadowing his actions in that season.

In Season 7, having recovered from being shot, he converted to Zen Buddhism. At the end of the episode "Zen and the Art of Murder" it is implied he abandoned Buddhism as he feels having to shoot and kill a suspect who pulled a gun made him "not a very good Buddhist." Bayliss' sexual orientation and religion had prompted him to develop a website, which was later shut down on request of Homicide Captain Roger Gaffney. In the series finale he is outraged when Luke Ryland, "the Internet killer," escapes prosecution as the result of a legal snafu. Bayliss is later shown cleaning out his desk, with the implication that he is quitting the force, despite telling Giardello that he is merely doing some spring-cleaning. Ryland is found shot dead, execution-style, a while later. In Homicide: The Movie (2000), Bayliss was revealed to have taken an extended leave of absence, claiming that he had "things to think about" and issues (a point on which he is mocked by Meldrick Lewis). He returned to the force to solve Lieutenant Giardello's murder with the help of his old partner Pembleton; afterward, he confessed to Pembleton that he had indeed murdered Ryland, and asked Pembleton to turn him in. In an ongoing set of Substack stories published by Kyle Secor that appear to be taken as canon by the H:LOTS creatives, Bayliss ends up being convicted for manslaughter in 2001 but receives a light 5-year prison sentence. He serves the entire stretch and is released without probation or parole in 2006.

Ryland's name is written on the Board in blue to indicate a closed, cold case. The circumstances leading up to that result (Bayliss' arrest or death) are not revealed, but Pembleton later comments that he caught two killers that night. In a Season 3 episode of Law & Order: Special Victims Unit, John Munch mentions he once had a partner who took cases too personally and ended up committing suicide; while he does not elaborate further, Munch was briefly partnered with Bayliss during the seventh season of Homicide.
