= Kyle Secor =

American television and film actor (born 1957)

- Born: May 31, 1957 (age 69); Tacoma, Washington, U.S.
- Occupations: Actor; director; writer
- Years active: 1986–present
- Spouse: Kari Coleman (m. 2002)
- Children: 2

Kyle Ivan Secor (born May 31, 1957) is an American actor, director and writer. He is best known for playing Detective Tim Bayliss in the NBC police drama Homicide: Life on the Street (1993–1999), opposite Andre Braugher as Detective Frank Pembleton. He also portrayed Rod Calloway, the husband of the president of the United States, in Commander in Chief (2005–2006), and had recurring roles in Veronica Mars and The Flash.

Secor began his career in theatre before appearing in the daytime soap opera Santa Barbara and the medical drama St. Elsewhere. His film credits include Sleeping with the Enemy (1991), City Slickers (1991), Untamed Heart (1993) and The Purge: Election Year (2016).

== Early life ==
Secor was born in Tacoma, Washington, and grew up in nearby Federal Way, the youngest of three sons. He graduated from Federal Way High School in 1975. As a teenager he hoped to play professional basketball, but severe nearsightedness complicated those ambitions.

After attending community college, he moved to Los Angeles and pursued acting on stage.

== Career ==
=== Stage work and early screen roles (1980s–1992) ===
Secor appeared in And a Nightingale Sang at the Santa Monica Playhouse in 1986 and portrayed Eugene Gant in Look Homeward, Angel at the Pasadena Playhouse later that year. A contemporary Los Angeles Times review discussed his performance in the latter production. In 1987, he performed in Bertolt Brecht's In the Jungle of Cities, also at the Pasadena Playhouse.

He played Brian Bradford on Santa Barbara from 1986 to 1987, followed by the role of Brett Johnston, a patient with AIDS, on St. Elsewhere. He appeared in several feature films around the turn of the decade, including Heart of Dixie, Sleeping with the Enemy, Delusion, City Slickers and The Doctor.

=== Breakthrough with Homicide: Life on the Street (1993–1999) ===
In 1993, Secor was cast as Detective Tim Bayliss in the NBC police drama Homicide: Life on the Street, developed by Tom Fontana from David Simon's nonfiction book about the Baltimore Police Department's homicide unit. Secor played Bayliss throughout the series' seven-season run and reprised the role in Homicide: The Movie (2000).

Bayliss begins the series as a relatively inexperienced detective and is partnered with Frank Pembleton, played by Andre Braugher. Their contrasting approaches to investigations and their developing relationship became central elements of the drama. Bayliss's investigation of the murder of Adena Watson recurs throughout the series, alongside storylines exploring his childhood, relationships and sexuality.

Secor also portrayed Bayliss in the 1996 Law & Order crossover episode "Charm City". His performance on Homicide received nominations from Viewers for Quality Television and for the TCA Award for Individual Achievement in Drama; these nominations require independent award-record verification before being expanded into a separate awards section.

In retrospective interviews following the series' arrival on streaming services in 2024, Secor discussed his collaboration with Braugher and the creative latitude afforded to the cast. He also participated in an oral history published by the Television Academy, discussing the series' distinctive production style and ensemble approach.

Secor has also discussed his experience directing on Homicide in a 2024 interview for the podcast Homicide: Life on the Set. In 2025, he revisited the series' production history in an interview with Australia's Special Broadcasting Service and discussed a retrospective podcast project with former co-star Reed Diamond.

=== Television roles after Homicide (1999–2010) ===
Following Homicide, Secor appeared in Party of Five and played Dr. Raleigh Stewart in the medical drama City of Angels. He later portrayed attorney Daniel X. Cavanaugh in Steven Bochco's legal drama Philly (2001–2002), and the Man with Red Eyes in the television adaptation of A Wrinkle in Time.

From 2004 to 2007, he appeared as Jake Kane, the father of murdered student Lilly Kane, in the mystery drama Veronica Mars. The character's involvement in the show's central mystery made him a recurring figure in its first season.

In Commander in Chief (2005–2006), Secor played Rod Calloway, husband of President Mackenzie Allen (Geena Davis). The role depicted the public and private challenges of a presidential spouse in an administration led by a fictional woman president of the United States. Contemporary reporting examined the reversal of the traditional first-lady role and Secor's approach to portraying the "first gentleman".

In a later career-spanning interview, Secor reflected on how audiences associated him with different roles in Homicide, Veronica Mars and Commander in Chief. His subsequent recurring television credits included Hidden Palms, Women's Murder Club and The Gates. He also guest-starred in Boston Legal, Ghost Whisperer, White Collar, The Closer and Hawaii Five-0.

=== Later roles and writing (2011–present) ===
Secor appeared in the supernatural drama Resurrection and in the 2016 dystopian horror film The Purge: Election Year, playing presidential candidate Minister Edwidge Owens.

In 2018, he was cast as Thomas Snow, the estranged father of Caitlin Snow, in the fifth season of the superhero series The Flash. The character is also known as Icicle. He later appeared in Grey's Anatomy, 9-1-1: Lone Star and The Rookie.

In 2021, Secor published Death of the Actor: Everything I Never Learned About Nothing, a book drawing on his experiences as a performer and examining acting in relation to the philosophical concept of nonduality.

== Personal life ==
Secor married actress Kari Coleman on January 28, 2002. They have two children.

== Filmography ==
Film
Year	Title	Role	Notes
1989	Heart of Dixie	Charles Payton 'Tuck' Tucker	
1991	Sleeping with the Enemy	John Fleishman	
1991	Delusion	Chevy Cox	
1991	City Slickers	Jeff	
1991	The Doctor	Alan Williams	
1991	Late for Dinner	Leland Shakes	
1993	Deaf Heaven	Matthew	Short film
1993	Untamed Heart	Howard	
1994	Drop Zone	Swoop	
2000	Endsville	Caleb Solar	
2000	Beat	Dave Kammerer	
2010	The Letter	Ken	Short film
2011	Pirate and Doctor	Doctor	Short film
2016	The Purge: Election Year	Minister Edwidge Owens	
2020	The Ball Method	Dr. Hollmann	Short Film
2020	TAWN-19	DCI Stevens	

Television
Year	Title	Role	Notes
1986–1987	Santa Barbara	Brian Bradford	TV series
1987–1988	St. Elsewhere	Brett Johnston	8 episodes
1988	Inherit the Wind	Bertram Cates	TV movie
1988	Shootdown	John Moore	TV movie
1989	The Outside Woman	Jimmy Leonard	TV movie
1990	Tales from the Crypt	Devlin Cates	Episode: "The Thing from the Grave"
1992	In the Line of Duty: Siege at Marion	Adam Swapp	TV movie
1992	Eerie, Indiana	Todd Ski (uncredited)	Episode: "No Brain, No Pain"
1992	Middle Ages	Brian Conover	TV series
1993	Silent Victim	Jed Jackson	TV movie
1993–1999	Homicide: Life on the Street	Det. Tim Bayliss	122 episodes Nominated – Q Award for Best Supporting Actor in a Quality Drama Series (1997–99); Nominated – TCA Award for Individual Achievement in Drama (1998)
1994	Midnight Runaround	Dale Adder	TV movie
1994	NYPD Blue	Dr. Danny Schrager	Episode: "Zeppo Marks Brothers"
1995	Beauty's Revenge	Kevin Reese	TV movie
1996	Law & Order	Det. Tim Bayliss	Episode: "Charm City"
1996	Her Desperate Choice	Jim Rossi	TV movie
1998	Mind Games	Doug Berrick	TV movie
1999	Party of Five	Evan Stilman	8 episodes
2000	Homicide: The Movie	Det. Tim Bayliss	TV movie
2000	City of Angels	Dr. Raleigh Stewart	11 episodes
2001	Bailey's Mistake	Lowell Lenox	TV movie
2001	Crossing Jordan	Det. Collins	Episode: "Pilot"
2001–2002	Philly	Daniel X. Cavanaugh	22 episodes
2002	Without a Trace	Duncan Muller	Episode: "He Saw, She Saw"
2003	A Wrinkle in Time	The Man with Red Eyes	TV movie
2004	CSI: Crime Scene Investigation	Dr. Vincent Lurie	Episode: "Butterflied"
2004	Infidelity	Jim Montet	TV movie
2004–2007	Veronica Mars	Jake Kane	10 episodes
2005–2006	Commander in Chief	Rod Calloway	19 episodes
2007	Hidden Palms	Alan 'Skip' Matthews	4 episodes
2007	Women's Murder Club	Hanson North	5 episodes
2008	Boston Legal	Dr. Robert Brooks	Episode: "True Love"
2009	Ghost Whisperer	Doug Bancroft	Episode: "Life on the Line"
2009	Dark Blue	FBI Agent Hollis	Episode: "Pilot"
2010	White Collar	Dr. Wayne Powell	Episode: "Vital Signs"
2010	The Deep End	Tom Lynch	Episode: "To Have and to Hold"
2010	The Closer	Mark Wheeler	Episode: "Layover"
2010	The Gates	Thomas Bates	4 episodes
2010	Outlaw	Warner Quinn	Episode: "In Re: Curtis Farwell"
2010	Hawaii Five-0	Ambassador Michael Reeves	Episode: "Nalowale"
2010	Criminal Minds	Don Sanderson	Episode: "25 to Life"
2010-2011	Private Practice	Adam Wilder	Episodes: "Can't Find My Way Back Home" and "The Hardest Part"
2013	The Mentalist	Father Peter DiBuono	Episode: "The Red Barn"
2013	Castle	FBI Deputy Director Anthony Freedman	Episode: "Watershed"
2014	American Horror Story: Coven	Bill	Episode: "The Seven Wonders"
2014	Resurrection	Brian Addison	Recurring (Season 2)
2015	Backstrom	Senator Tobias Percival II	Premier Episode: "Dragon Slayer"
2015	Aquarius	Leo Nankin	Episode: "The Hunter Gets Captured by the Game"
2016	Notorious	Dr. Govner	Episode: "Chase"
2018–2019	The Flash	Thomas Snow/Icicle	3 episodes
2019	Grey's Anatomy	John Dickinson	Recurring role (Season 15)
2021	9-1-1: Lone Star	Deputy Fire Chief Alden Radford	3 episodes
2021	The Rookie	Special Agent Sam Taggart	Episodes: "Triple Duty" and "Life and Death"
