= Frank Pembleton =

- Det. Francis Xavier "Frank" Pembleton
- First appearance: January 31, 1993 (1x01, "Gone for Goode")
- Last appearance: May 8, 1998 (6x23, Fallen Heroes (2)) (HLOTS); February 13, 2000; Homicide: The Movie
- Created by: Tom Fontana
- Portrayed by: Andre Braugher

In-universe information
- Gender: Male
- Title: Detective
- Occupation: Teacher; Homicide detective (formerly)
- Spouse: Mary Whelan-Pembleton (m.1986)
- Children: Olivia Pembleton; Frank Pembleton Jr.
- Nationality: American

Francis Xavier "Frank" Pembleton is a fictional homicide detective on the television drama series Homicide: Life on the Street portrayed by Emmy Award–winning actor Andre Braugher. He is a primary character of the show through the first six seasons. Although the show featured an ensemble cast, Pembleton would become the fan favorite and is often identified as the show's signature character. He is based on Baltimore Police Department Detective Harry Edgerton, who, like Pembleton, was an eccentric New York–born African American detective in the BPD homicide unit featured in David Simon's book Homicide: A Year on the Killing Streets. The character also appeared in the Law & Order episode "Charm City".

== Early life ==
Pembleton was born into a Catholic family in New York City on July 1, 1961. It was implied that he had siblings, but they never appear on the show. He was educated first in a Catholic elementary school and then in a Jesuit high school, a reference to Braugher attending a Jesuit school, St. Ignatius College Prep, in Chicago. Frank later said that "the Jesuits taught me how to think," which comes up on the show from time to time. He knows Latin and Greek and is well-versed in Catholic theology. He met his future wife, Mary, on the Great Lawn in Central Park shortly after graduating from the police academy when he was 24. He claims that he knew as soon as he met her that she was "the one". They were married in 1986.

In October 1988, Frank and Mary moved to Baltimore because Frank wanted to be a detective and felt there was no room for advancement in the NYPD. The move caused a permanent rift between him and his in-laws, since he had moved "their little girl" so far from home. He loved working in Baltimore, however, and Mary got a job as a lobbyist and often took trips to Washington, D.C. where her family lives.

He had become a homicide detective by 1989.

== Family ==
Frank and Mary, once settled in their careers, decided to have a family. They were forced to see a variety of fertility specialists before Mary was able to become pregnant. They had two children, a daughter Olivia (born 1996) and a son, Frank Jr.

Frank was the only detective to maintain a marriage – the others either never married, had their spouses die, or got divorced. Frank and Mary's did go through some rough times, owing to Frank's incredible drive for work. Even after marriage counseling, Mary felt that he had become too detached from his family. She was also bothered when he lost his faith, especially when he denied Olivia a baptism for many months. Mary left for a couple of months while pregnant with Frank, Jr. but eventually came back. She was happy that he quit the force in the Season 6 finale.

== Career ==
From the first episode right through to the movie finale, references are made to Pembleton's reputation as a "legend" in terms of his skills as a detective; he is especially skilled in interrogation, and he is depicted as a master of getting confessions from suspects in "the Box." Through a mixture of sympathy, confusion and fear, Pembleton almost always gets a suspect to crack. At the same time, he often fails to endear himself to his fellow detectives, who resent his black-and-white attitude toward the job and his arrogant demeanor.

Frank's religious faith is tested in the three-part premiere of Season 3 when he investigates a series of killings that are revealed to have been religiously motivated. The thought that God can allow such crimes to be committed greatly disturbs Frank, and he chooses to renounce his faith, refusing even to go to church until near the end of Season 5.

In Season 3, Pembleton is asked by Deputy Commissioner James C. Harris to help Congressman Jeremy Wade cover up a homosexual liaison by dismissing a report that he was kidnapped. Pembleton reaches an agreement with Wade to admit the report was false, but word gets to the press and accusations of a cover-up costs Wade an election. When confronted, Pembleton looks to Harris, who denies that he sanctioned any agreement, and Al Giardello (who was deliberately kept in the dark) can offer no help. Disgusted with the situation, Pembleton throws down his badge and quits. However, his intuitive attitude towards his work meshes poorly with his home life, and he annoys Mary to the point that she gently pressures him to go back to work, which he eventually does. Pembleton is later called to testify about the cover-up and reluctantly states that he decided to offer Wade the deal on his own; however, he continues to harbor a deep resentment for Harris long after the incident is closed.

Except for target practice in Season 4 and re-certification training in Season 5, Frank never fires his gun during the course of the series. It is implied on a few occasions that he is in fact unwilling to use deadly force, which becomes significant during the two-part finale of Season 6.

=== The stroke ===
In the fourth season finale, Frank suffers a stroke while interrogating a suspect, and nearly dies. When he returns to duty, his speech and memory have been noticeably impaired. He is assigned desk duty until he passes his firearms exam, and is frustrated when others baby him. When his blood pressure medication impairs his focus and sexual relations with Mary, he briefly stops taking it, but resumes after failing his first attempt at the exam.

The effects of Pembleton's stroke rapidly diminish over the course of the fifth season, mostly due to pressure from NBC who felt that Pembleton's halting delivery and memory lapses made his character difficult to watch. By the middle of the season, only a slight occasional stammer remains; by the sixth season, the effects of Pembleton's stroke seem to have been almost magically eradicated. However, the stroke adversely affects his effectiveness when he refuses to take his medication for a time; in the episode "Kaddish", he aggressively questions a suspect he believes to be guilty of a shooting in a fast food restaurant, only to be told that another person has confessed to the crime. Also, in the two-part finale of Season 6, he seems to struggle to aim his weapon and appears unable to see clearly, switching from one eye to the other. His determination to overcome his stroke and return to police work also alienates him from Mary and their daughter Olivia, and they leave him for a time.

=== Pembleton and Bayliss ===
When Det. Tim Bayliss is assigned to the homicide unit, Lieutenant Giardello partnered him with Pembleton, who had no patience for a rookie. They were partners for most of the series, though Frank never allowed Tim to get too close. Although Bayliss had great respect for Frank, to the point of calling Frank his best friend, Pembleton was often dismissive of Bayliss' attempts at friendship. When Bayliss expresses sadness at Frank's abrupt resignation in Season 3, Pembleton is indifferent, although he willingly partners with him again after coming back to the force.

Their partnership was strained when Pembleton investigated the accidental shooting of a foreign exchange student by Tim's cousin, Jim (portrayed by David Morse). Pembleton was convinced that Jim, if only in the few seconds before the shot was fired, was motivated by racism. Pembleton investigates the case vigorously, and is outraged when Jim is acquitted.

In the Season 5 episode "Betrayal," a case involving a man beating his stepdaughter to death causes an emotional Bayliss to tell Frank about how his uncle sexually abused him as a child, and his father was dismissive when told about it. When Frank attempts to be consoling, Bayliss rebuffs him and ends their partnership, causing them to become cold and indifferent toward one another. They make amends after Mary's leaving causes Frank to tentatively reach out.

In the Season 6 finale, during a gun battle with members of dead drug kingpin Luther Mahoney's organization, Frank takes aim at a suspect but cannot bring himself to fire. Bayliss pushes Frank out of the way. As a result, he is shot and critically wounded. Since Mahoney was shot by Detective Mike Kellerman, of Lt. Giardello's squad, Giardello became suspicious about the circumstances of Mahoney's shooting, even though it was officially ruled justified. When he orders Pembleton to re-investigate the shooting, Pembleton interrogates a hostile Kellerman, who finally admits, without remorse, that he shot Mahoney when the dealer's weapon was pointed downward, endangering no one.

Pembleton met Bayliss's mother, Virginia, while Tim recovered from surgery. She told Frank what Tim thought of their friendship: "He thinks the world of you. He says you're his friend. He says you're not a person who has friends, but he's your friend." Shortly afterwards, Pembleton and Mary say a prayer for Tim, during which Pembleton is visibly distraught (something he is almost never shown to be in the course of the show) and refers to Tim as his friend.

Disgusted by Giardello allowing Kellerman to resign without charges and tormented by guilt over Bayliss's shooting, Frank quits the force and is absent for Season 7.

=== Retirement and return ===
Pembleton retires from the force after Bayliss is shot, but two years later, Bayliss and Pembleton (who is now working as a professor at a Jesuit college) both come out of retirement to help solve the shooting of their former lieutenant Al Giardello. After the case is solved, Pembleton inadvertently "solves" one final case when Bayliss confesses to murdering serial killer Luke Ryland.
