= Meldrick Lewis =

- Meldrick Lewis
- First appearance: January 31, 1993 (1x01, "Gone for Goode")
- Last appearance: May 21, 1999 (7x22, "Forgive Us Our Trespasses") (H:LOTS); February 13, 2000; Homicide: The Movie; October 16, 2013 (15x05, "Wonderland Story") (SVU)
- Created by: Tom Fontana
- Portrayed by: Clark Johnson

In-universe information
- Gender: Male
- Title: Detective
- Occupation: Homicide Detective
- Family: Eleanor Lewis (mother); Medea (grandmother); Anthony (brother)
- Spouse: Barbara Shivers-Lewis (divorced)
- Nationality: American

Meldrick Lewis is a fictional character on the television series Homicide: Life on the Street, played by Clark Johnson. The character is loosely based on Baltimore detective Donald Waltemeyer and appeared in the series for its entire run. Lewis had the very first and last lines of the series.

Born on September 10, 1962, Lewis was raised in Baltimore's Lafayette Court housing project. In 1996, he watched its demolition and kept a brick from the rubble as a memento. He attended Lake Clifton High School from 1976 to 1980. It is indicated he was raised Baptist, but his wedding was performed by a member of the Universal Life Church.

Lewis joined the homicide unit in April 1990. His first partner in the series was Steve Crosetti, who occasionally irritated him with his arcane historical interests and demeanor. The two usually got along well, however, so Crosetti's later suicide deeply unnerved Lewis. At first he refused to even believe it could be a suicide, reasoning that Crosetti, a devout Catholic and devoted father, would never violate his faith and abandon his child. In time he accepted Crosetti's suicide but still felt a certain dismay that he had never known Crosetti was "in that kind of pain" and apparently felt he could not tell Lewis about his problems. Stan Bolander comforted Lewis by saying that in giving up his prized vintage yo-yo as a gift to Lewis, Crosetti was in his own way of saying goodbye.

Lewis remained without a partner for a time until partnering with Mike Kellerman, who transferred into Homicide from the arson unit at the start of Season 4. This partnership initially worked reasonably well, but had some strains as Kellerman slid toward alcoholism and humiliation when he was falsely accused of having taken bribes while in his previous position. As Kellerman kept his problems less secret than Crosetti, Lewis was able to stop a potential suicide attempt.

Lewis and Kellerman had earlier found themselves arguing with each other over a Nation of Islam group acting as a private security force in a Baltimore City housing project. During a homicide investigation, the Muslims baited Kellerman with racial remarks, and it did not help when Lewis agreed with the Muslims' presence in the projects as because of them, there were fewer homicides in the projects. Lewis nonetheless forced the Muslims' leader to answer both him and Kellerman (the leader would only speak to Black homicide detectives about the identity of a murder suspect) during an attempt at turning the two against each other.

When Kellerman and Lewis were finally able to snare drug kingpin Luther Mahoney for drug trafficking and murder, Lewis beat up Mahoney until he grabbed Lewis' gun. However, Kellerman and Terri Stivers showed up in time to prevent Mahoney from killing Lewis, and Kellerman shot and killed Mahoney during an ambiguous standoff. Although Lewis initially approved of Kellerman's actions, he later decided they could no longer be partners.

During Season 6, Lewis got into an altercation with Mahoney's sister Georgia Rae and was suspended. He persuaded fellow detective Paul Falsone to feed him information about the organization, which he used to start an internal war that eventually led to a bloodbath for both the police and the criminals. Kellerman finally admitted the truth about the Mahoney shooting - that the man had not been pointing Lewis' weapon at anyone when Kellerman shot him - and resigned in order to keep Lewis and Stivers from losing their jobs. Kellerman then asked to borrow Lewis' gun so he could commit suicide, but Lewis quietly says "I can't do that, Mikey" and leaves him by himself.

In Season 7, Lewis developed problems with his new partner, Rene Sheppard, when she suffered a brutal beating and had her gun taken from her by a suspect, who shot at Lewis and nearly killed him (the bullet nicked the crown of his trademark hat). Lewis refused to partner with any of the female detectives in the unit until the final episode, in which he and Sheppard achieved a reconciliation of sorts and began to work a crime scene together.

According to the Season 4 episode "I've Got a Secret," Lewis had a mentally ill brother named Anthony, who was institutionalized roughly 20 years earlier as he was a danger to himself and others. Lewis confessed to Kellerman that he did not intervene on one of Anthony's suicide attempts, and even briefly hoped it might succeed as it would end Anthony's suffering and the hardships he put on the rest of the family. Lewis estimated that he last visited Anthony in 1978; he tried to do so again during this episode, but Anthony refused to see him.

Lewis had a harshly realistic view of the job, and was openly critical of Tim Bayliss for putting so much of his emotional energy into the unforgiving field of police work.

In 1996, Lewis married Barbara Shivers on extremely short notice. The couple eventually split up. Those who knew Lewis were unsurprised at the breakup; in fact, up to the moment of the wedding many of his co-workers (particularly John Munch) assumed the engagement was a hoax.

In October 2013, Lewis attended a roast for Munch in New York City following his retirement from the NYPD. Lewis jokingly told the attendees that "we [Munch's former colleagues] ran his butt outta B-more."

== Behind the scenes ==
Clark Johnson regularly improvised during filming and made up his own jokes and dialogue; writer and producer James Yoshimura called him "the king of the ad lib."
