= Al Giardello =

Alphonse Michael "Gee" Giardello Sr.
- Shift Commander Lieutenant Al 'Gee' Giardello
- First appearance: January 31, 1993 (1x01, "Gone for Goode")
- Last appearance: May 21, 1999 (7x22, "Forgive Us Our Trespasses") (HLOTS); February 13, 2000; Homicide: The Movie
- Created by: Tom Fontana
- Portrayed by: Yaphet Kotto

In-universe information
- Nickname: Gee
- Gender: Male
- Title: Lieutenant
- Occupation: Shift Commander of Homicide Unit (formerly)
- Family: Rosina Giardello (grandmother)
- Spouse: Joanne (deceased)
- Children: Mike Giardello (son); Teresa (daughter); Charisse (daughter)
- Relatives: Al (grandson); Mario (cousin)

Alphonse Michael Giardello Sr. (called "Gee" by the other detectives) is a fictional character from the television drama Homicide: Life on the Street. The character was played by Yaphet Kotto. He is based on Baltimore Police Department Shift Lieutenant Gary D'Addario, a member of the BPD homicide unit described in David Simon's book Homicide: A Year on the Killing Streets which served as the inspiration for the series as a whole. The character also appeared in the Law & Order episode "Baby, It's You".

== Biography ==
Al Giardello – nicknamed "Gee" after the only thing he could say when called to his first murder scene as a rookie as well as a reference to his last name – is the commander of the homicide unit shift followed by the series. Holding the rank of lieutenant, he encounters a number of opportunities for promotion during the series, only to have his hopes dashed by the political maneuvering of his superiors. At the end of the seventh season, Giardello is offered a promotion to Captain but turns it down, since the position would require him to transfer out of the homicide unit.

He is introduced early in the series as a widower of mixed Sicilian American and African American heritage. He originates from Southeast Baltimore, where his father was from Baltimore's Little Italy and his mother was from a neighboring housing project known as the Perkins Homes. He played three sports and was Prom King when he was in high school. He takes a degree of pride in both heritages, speaking near fluent Italian and fraternizing with many of the BPD's African American and Italian American officers alike. According to the episodes "Black and Blue" and "Narcissus", he began his career in the department in 1968.

Gee enjoys cooking and is an excellent Hearts player, as revealed in the episode "All Through the House". As Bayliss tries (and fails) to hustle him out of some easy cash during a slow night, he learns from Munch that Gee put one of his three children through college by playing Hearts for money.

In the Season 6 episode "Lies and Other Truths", it is revealed that Gee has kept in touch with a former KGB agent who apparently held him captive at some earlier point in his life. The agent tried to brainwash Gee for four months, without success, and Gee eventually persuaded him to defect to the West with the help of a $300,000 bribe.

A physically imposing, highly articulate man, Giardello's cultural attitude stands in sharp contrast to both his Baltimore upbringing and many other officers in the Department. Despite his authoritative nature, Gee is essentially a humorous, good-natured man who seems to see himself as a mentor and father figure to his detectives, who are tremendously loyal to him. He also has a particular fondness for children, manifesting itself in marked outrage whenever children are murdered, an attribute shared by many other detectives.

== Family ==
Gee is introduced as a widower whose wife has been dead for at least seven years prior to the first season. According to the Season 7 premiere "La Famiglia", he has three children: two daughters, Teresa and Charisse, and a son, Michael (whom Charisse refers to as Al Jr.). He has one grandchild, Al, who was born to Charisse in January 1999. He also expresses missing his late wife in several episodes of the first four seasons as well as his devoted, if on occasion strained, relationship with his children. In Season 4, Gee delays his flight out of Baltimore for a daughter's wedding for so long that by the time he does get to BWI, the weather has made it impossible for him to fly to the event in San Francisco, and he is left devastated.

In "La Famiglia," Mike - an FBI agent - comes to Baltimore from Arizona to assist in the investigation of three murders in Little Italy. One of the victims is Gee's cousin Mario, whom Mike remembers fondly from his childhood and who was killed as a result of his decision to testify against a union boss 25 years earlier. Mike ultimately resigns from the FBI and joins the Baltimore Police Department in order to be closer to his father. In the series finale "Forgive Us Our Trespasses," Teresa and Mike attend Gee's promotion ceremony. His paternal grandmother, Rosina Giardello (whom he called "Nonna"), was still alive at the time of his death in 2000.

== As commander ==
Gee is generally supportive of his detectives and usually places their success or welfare over the desires of those above him. An early example of this concerned his discovery that his superiors were hiding the fact they were removing asbestos from the squad building. When someone under his command gets too far out of line, though, he can take them to task very sharply, at one point even forcing Bayliss to apologize to "the bosses" for making an angry phone call to them over a case. Curiously, at his most annoyed or angry, Gee expresses a kind of whimsical and "bubbly" attitude, but one that comes with threats or hints of menace. He is only rarely given to physical outbursts of rage, such as sweeping everything off his desk or attacking a storage cabinet with a baseball bat.

Gee is also in many respects "old school"; at times he expresses nostalgia for the Baltimore of his youth. Although he is critical of the abuses he endured in his early days on the police force, he expresses a grudging respect for what he feels the harder approach accomplished, including the fact that in the old days, cop-killers would not survive to face juries and trials. Giardello also possesses an intense belief in loyalty among fellow police officers as a "brotherhood"; in the episode "Black and Blue", he disagreed with Detective Frank Pembleton's suspicion that a cop had committed a shooting, and implied that loyalty to other cops is above loyalty to the citizenry, including the African-American citizenry. This was relevant, as the shooting occurred in a mostly black neighborhood and had become a racially charged issue. However, Gee's commitment to the truth above all was proven here: after Det. Pembleton's interrogation led a man they both knew was innocent to confess to the shooting, he told his detective to carry on with the case, and this led to the arrest of a police officer.

Giardello tends to allow his detectives to investigate murders in a manner that is more efficient but less discreet, very much unlike the preferred methods instructed by the department's upper command. Gee's command style allows for cases to be cleared and allows his subordinates a form of investigative freedom which may result in more negative press for the department than what the upper command wishes for.

Gee's leadership style and earned respect from his detectives mirrored the real-life dynamic with Lt. Gary D'Addario, who had a recurring role on the show as SWAT team commander Lt. Jasper.

== Relationship with bosses ==
Much of Gee's time is spent fighting against "the bosses," which is a strong factor in his initial failures at advancement. Giardello is considered a renegade commander and a thorn in the bosses' side due to his tendency to alert the media about investigations and allow his officers to investigate in a way that, while effective, is not representative of the department's political objectives.

Early in the series, Giardello finds conflict with George Barnfather, a college-educated bureaucrat who is less experienced on the street and more interested in appeasing those who outrank him. Giardello is particularly incensed when Barnfather refuses to grant Steve Crosetti an honor guard because his suicide would create bad publicity for the department. Despite their differing objectives, Barnfather eventually grows to work with and even respect Giardello following the African Revival Movement fallout. After Giardello finds that a department colonel has been stealing money from the department and forces him to resign, Barnfather is promoted and offers Giardello his support when he needs it.

Giardello finds most of his trouble throughout the department, however, with Deputy Commissioner James C. Harris. At one point in Giardello's career, Harris proved to be a useful ally whom Gee could turn to; that relationship, however, deteriorates with Gee's growing acts of command-oriented rebellion. Harris had asked Detective Frank Pembleton to cover up a scandal involving congressman Jeremy Wade, which nonetheless resulted in a lost election. Despite having ordered Pembleton to leave him out of the cover up, Harris believed Giardello could have done more to protect the Congressman in the aftermath. To punish Gee, Harris purposefully promotes an incompetent and bigoted officer named Roger Gaffney to a captain's position that Gee had earned and expected. As Gaffney is a "fat Irish ass" very much like Gee's racist training partner Mickey Shea, Harris sends Gee a reminder that his days in the BPD will be subject to dealing with contempt from the department's upper command. Gee, however, gets the last word on Harris after the fallout with the African Revival Movement, in which Harris' one-time partner Burundi Robinson provides Gee with incriminating information regarding Harris and a drug case where a large amount of heroin went missing: Harris stole the drugs and sold them to a dealer, and when Robinson protested they decided to flip a coin, with the loser resigning and the winner burying the story. After Robinson's suicide, Gee leaks this information to the press, and Harris is forced to resign in disgrace, with the ever-pleasant Gaffney pretending that he's upset about Harris' "long and distinguished career" being ruined because he wants to anger Gee. Nevertheless, Gaffney thinks better of antagonizing Gee after this incident.

== Experiences with racism ==
According to Gee's childhood associate Felix Wilson, there were few Black policemen in Baltimore when they were growing up. Giardello joined the BPD in 1968 during a racially turbulent era and was subject to working under a predominantly White department in a largely African American city. One of Gee's first experiences on the force dealt with the Baltimore riot of 1968, which occurred in response to the assassination of African American leader Martin Luther King Jr. Gee described the event to Detective Frank Pembleton as a test of his loyalty, in which Gee was forced to determine if he would side with his community or his department. Gee experienced racism first-hand at the orders of his training officer Mickey Shea, an Irish officer who had forced a young Giardello to ride in the back of the patrol car. Shea told Gee that he "wouldn't share the front seat of his car with a nigger," intentionally trying to provoke Gee into assaulting him so that he could be brought up on charges and thereby kicked off the force.

Gee had also found conflict by other African Americans both professionally and socially. Within the BPD, Gee is repeatedly passed over for promotion to captain by African American commanders Deputy Commissioner James Harris and Colonel George Barnfather for White officers Megan Russert and Roger Gaffney, both of whom are less experienced and less competent. Gaffney is specifically promoted over Gee as punishment from Deputy Commissioner Harris due to Gaffney's racist attitude, large frame, and Irish background that resembled Shea. Off the job, Gee claims that African American women have discriminated against him romantically on the basis of his appearance being "too black" (It is also noteworthy that Gee's African American supervisors are of a much lighter complexion than him and may hence practice similar discrimination).

It is stated by his son Michael that Gee was one of the department's first Black Lieutenants and that the police department had a long history of hatred towards Baltimore's Black community. Michael says he was the first black lieutenant, but Gee is ranked by Black officers such as Deputy Com. Harris and Col. Barnfather. Normally this would indicate that they both made lieutenant before him, but given Giardello's known predilection of being impolitic with the brass (including being a known leak to the press to put media pressure on the department) and Harris and Barnfather being known political animals that would play ball with their superiors, it is of strong consideration that Giardello was passed over for Captain by both for that reason and not strictly racism by either whites or lighter skinned blacks. Barnfather's youth is another indicator that Giardello was passed over by the Bosses for not cooperating in a political manner. Despite the various racial setbacks, Gee nevertheless advances in the department, managing to find camaraderie amongst many of the department's officers while maintaining a supportive attitude of Baltimore's majority African American community.

Near the end of the final season, Giardello is finally offered the Captaincy and he tentatively accepts. However, upon reflection he realizes that he would miss being a shift commander - overseeing cases and giving advice and direction to his detectives. As his promotion would result in him leaving Homicide, he simply doesn't show up for his promotion ceremony.

== The Movie ==
In Homicide: The Movie, Gee has left the department and is running for mayor on a platform in favor of drug legalization, with a considerable lead in the polls. The events of the film lead to an attempt on his life, which in turn prompts all of his living former detectives to come together and find the shooter. He is rushed to the hospital for emergency surgery, during which the assailant breaks in and shoots him again, as well as one of the surgeons operating on him. He survives the surgery and talks with his son Mike, but later dies of an aneurysm. Gee subsequently finds himself in an afterlife version of the homicide squad room, filled with the spirits of murder victims and police officers, and briefly meets Adena Watson before sitting down to play cards with Detectives Steve Crosetti and Beau Felton. As they wait for the next "arrival," Crosetti and Felton urge Gee to let go of his worries and to literally follow the old adage, "Rest in Peace."
