= James Yoshimura =

American writer and producer

- Born: Chicago, Illinois, United States
- Writing career
- Language: English
- Genres: Television, film

James Yoshimura is an American writer and producer, best known for his screenwriting work on the NBC series Homicide: Life on the Street and the short-lived Fox series The Jury, for which he served as a co-creator. He also co-wrote Homicide: The Movie, a made-for-television film that came out in 2000, after the series ended. Yoshimura has received two Emmy Award nominations: one for Homicide: The Movie and one for the Homicide episode "Subway", which also won a Peabody Award for excellence in television broadcasting.

== Biography ==
Yoshimura was born in Chicago, Illinois. He attended the Yale School of Drama in New Haven, Connecticut, where he had a playwriting class with classmate and future comedian Lewis Black. Yoshimura began his career writing for theater. Among his theater works were the plays "Union Boys", and "Mercenaries". The latter play was about three American mercenaries who are placed on trial following a defeated coup of a leftist island government. The New York Times was critical of the play, which it said lacked adequate characterization, while reviewer Frank Rich complimented "its author's willingness to reach, as well as his flickers of talent: Mr. Yoshimura can write theatrical scenes, spin dark jokes and ask big questions."

Yoshimura is a friend of Tom Fontana and Yoshimura credits Fontana with getting him work and teaching him how to write for television.

Yoshimura worked with Fontana on Homicide: Life on the Street, where Yoshimura served as a writer and later producer for the duration of the show's seven seasons. Many of the scripts Yoshimura wrote focused on one strong central story, rather than a large number of subplots. The first Homicide script he wrote was the first season episode "Son of a Gun". Among the other scripts he wrote was the sixth season episode "Subway", which featured a man becoming pinned between a subway car and train platform, leaving him only about an hour to live. Yoshimura was inspired to write it based on an episode of the HBO hidden-camera documentary show Taxicab Confessions, where a New York City detective discussed a similar real-life event. The episode won a 1997 Peabody Award for excellence in television broadcasting, and received two Emmy Award nominations during the 50th Primetime Emmy Awards season, including one for Yoshimura for Outstanding Writing in a Drama Series.

David Simon, a writer and producer who worked on Homicide: Life on the Street, suggested Yoshimura as a possible writing partner when he was pitching the mini-series The Corner to HBO executives, but writer David Mills was chosen instead. Yoshimura co-wrote the script for Homicide: The Movie, the made-for-television film that came out after the series ended. Yoshimura and his fellow co-writers, Fontana and Eric Overmyer, conceived the story for the film in one weekend. Yoshimura and the co-writers received an Emmy nomination for Outstanding Writing for a Miniseries or Movie, although the award ultimately went to Simon and Mills for The Corner.

Yoshimura co-created and wrote for the 2004 Fox series The Jury, along with Homicide executive producers Barry Levinson and Tom Fontana.

In 2010, Yoshimura returned to television as he joined Simon and Overmyer's series Treme as a writer and producer for its second season. He later went on to write for Homeland's third season.
