= Homicide: Life on the Street season 1 =

Season of television series

Homicide: Life on the Street
- Season 1
- DVD cover art for the first two seasons of Homicide: Life on the Street
- Starring: Daniel Baldwin; Richard Belzer; Andre Braugher; Clark Johnson; Yaphet Kotto; Melissa Leo; Jon Polito; Kyle Secor; Ned Beatty
- No. of episodes: 9

Release
- Original network: NBC
- Original release: January 31 – March 31, 1993

Season chronology
- Next → Season 2

The first season of Homicide: Life on the Street, an American police procedural drama television series, originally aired in the United States on NBC between January 31 and March 31, 1993. The show was created by Paul Attanasio, with film director Barry Levinson and television writer and producer Tom Fontana serving as executive producers. Adapted from David Simon's 1991 non-fiction book Homicide: A Year on the Killing Streets, the season followed the fictional detectives of Baltimore Police Department homicide unit and the murder cases they investigate. The show was broadcast on Wednesdays at 9 p.m. EST, with the exception of the series premiere, which aired immediately after Super Bowl XXVII.

The season introduced regular cast members Daniel Baldwin, Ned Beatty, Richard Belzer, Andre Braugher, Clark Johnson, Yaphet Kotto, Melissa Leo, Jon Polito and Kyle Secor. Most of the primary characters were based on real-life Baltimore detectives from Simon's book, including Gary D'Addario, Terrence McLarney, Harry Edgerton, Donald Worden and Jay Landsman. Many of the first season story arcs were also adapted from the book, most notably the 1988 Baltimore slaying of 11-year-old Latonya Kim Wallace, which was the basis for the murder case of Adena Watson in Homicide. Another multi-episode arc included Lee Tergesen as an officer who is friends with the homicide squad and later gets shot. "Night of the Dead Living," originally written as the third episode, was moved to become the season finale at the insistence of NBC executives, which led to several notable continuity errors.

The first season received consistently positive reviews, with several commentators declaring it one of the best shows on television at the time. The episode "Three Men and Adena", which consists almost entirely of one police interrogation with three actors, received particularly positive reviews and was declared one of the 100 greatest television moments by Entertainment Weekly. The series premiere, "Gone for Goode", opened to a season-high viewership of 18.2 million households due to a lead-in from the Super Bowl. The Nielsen ratings declined throughout the season, which Homicide producers attributed to a poor time-slot and heavy competition from the ABC comedies Home Improvement and Coach. The ratings led NBC executives to demand changes to the show before renewing Homicide for a second season.

Homicide: Life on the Street received four Emmy Award nominations during its first season and won two, and also received a Writers Guild of America award and a Directors Guild of America Award. The first and second seasons of Homicide were released together in a four-DVD box-set on May 27, 2003.

== Episodes ==
When first shown on network television, "Night of the Dead Living" aired out of the order that it was produced in as the season's finale. The DVD of this season presents the episodes in their correct chronological order, restoring all storylines and character developments.

No. overall	No. in season	Title	Directed by	Written by	Original release date	Prod. code	U.S. viewers (millions)
1	1	"Gone for Goode"	Barry Levinson	Paul Attanasio	January 31, 1993	101	28.1
Detectives Meldrick Lewis (Clark Johnson) and Steve Crosetti (Jon Polito) investigate an elderly woman named Calpurnia Church, whom they believe has murdered her husbands to collect their insurance money. Detective Stanley Bolander (Ned Beatty) pushes his reluctant partner, John Munch (Richard Belzer), to follow up on a cold case in which a woman was run over by a car. Munch eventually elicits a confession from a drunk driver who hit her. Detective Kay Howard (Melissa Leo) continues a recent lucky streak by easily solving a murder immediately after taking it on, much to the bewilderment of her partner, Beau Felton (Daniel Baldwin). Eccentric loner Detective Frank Pembleton (Andre Braugher) is forced to partner with rookie Tim Bayliss (Kyle Secor), who disagrees with Pembleton's methods when he tricks a suspect (Alexander Chaplin) into confessing to murder. For his first case as primary investigator, Bayliss is assigned to the murder of 11-year-old Adena Watson.
2	2	"Ghost of a Chance"	Martin Campbell	Story by : Tom Fontana; Teleplay by : Noel Behn	February 3, 1993	102	14.6
Unable to find evidence against a brutal murder suspect, Howard tries to seek help from the victim's ghost. She is frustrated when her partner, Felton, mocks her superstitious beliefs, but Felton later helps her solve the murder with help from a tarot card reader. Munch and Bolander respond to the supposed death of an elderly man, only to find him still alive, much to the disappointment of the man's wife (Gwen Verdon), who is extremely unhappy with their marriage. When that same man turns up dead later, Bolander and medical examiner Carol Blythe (Wendy Hughes) debate whether it should be considered a homicide. Meanwhile, Bayliss continues his investigation into the murder of 11-year-old Adena Watson. A rookie detective on his first case, Bayliss has trouble emotionally detaching from her death, and Al "Gee" Giardello (Yaphet Kotto) demands he show more confidence. When later pressured by his superiors to take Bayliss off the case, Giardello refuses and defends the rookie detective.
3	3	"Night of the Dead Living"	Michael Lehmann	Story by : Tom Fontana & Frank Pugliese; Teleplay by : Frank Pugliese	March 31, 1993	103	9.7
This episode recounts a hot summer night (last) September, recalling events that occurred earlier in the chronology of the season (before Officer Thormann is shot, and before the dead end in the Adena Watson case). The squad works the night shift, but no homicides are reported, leaving the detectives to brood over their personal matters. Bayliss is still investigating the Watson murder but makes no progress, prompting Pembleton to encourage him to approach it from the mindset of a criminal. This advice leads Bayliss to a breakthrough discovery. Meanwhile, Howard learns her brother-in-law has been cheating on her sister, and Felton surprises Howard by offering her genuine words of comfort. Bolander contemplates asking Blythe on a date and, when he finally builds up the courage, she accepts. Throughout the night, the detectives encounter several odd characters, including a criminal who dresses like Santa Claus (Cleve Wall) and a cleaning woman (N'Bushe Wright) who keeps her baby in an animal carrier while she works.
4	4	"Son of a Gun"	Nick Gomez	Story by : Tom Fontana; Teleplay by : James Yoshimura	February 10, 1993	104	10.1
When fellow officer Chris Thormann (Lee Tergesen) is shot in the line of duty, his friend Crosetti takes it personally and presses a reluctant Giardello to assign him the case. A man (Larry E. Hull) claims to have witnessed the shooting and says he will testify in court. Meanwhile, Bayliss and Pembleton continue their investigation into the murder of Adena Watson, and the two become frustrated with each other when nothing new develops. Pembleton requests a new partner, but Giardello refuses. Elsewhere, as Bolander prepares for a date with Blythe, he strikes up an unusual friendship with his neighbor (Luis Guzmán), a lonely Latino cabinetmaker who has built a coffin in his apartment. Meanwhile, Howard, Felton and Lewis uncover information that helps advance several outstanding homicide cases, including that of Calpurnia Church, the elderly woman suspected of killing her husbands for insurance money.
5	5	"A Shot in the Dark"	Bruce Paltrow	Story by : Tom Fontana; Teleplay by : Jorge Zamacona	February 24, 1993	105	12.8
Officer Thormann has a miraculous recovery and will live, but doctors say he will be blind. Crosetti is convinced they have found the shooter, but an unconvinced Lewis keeps investigating, much to Crosetti's frustration. Lewis' suspicions are later confirmed when he discovers the real shooter, and Crosetti feels guilt over letting his personal friendship with Thormann cloud his judgment. Meanwhile, Bayliss suspects Adena Watson was murdered by a local arabber, but Pembleton disagrees. Pembleton is later impressed to find the physical evidence substantiates Bayliss' theory. Bayliss' investigation is nearly thwarted when his superior, Captain George Barnfather (Clayton LeBouef), tells the press about secret evidence. Bayliss lashes out and insults Barnfather, and is later forced by Giardello to apologize. Bolander and Munch investigate a double shooting that has left a drug dealer dead, and eventually discover the shooter was the dealer's own bodyguard.
6	6	"Three Men and Adena"	Martin Campbell	Tom Fontana	March 3, 1993	106	10.8
Bayliss and Pembleton bring in arabber Risley Tucker (Moses Gunn), the prime suspect for the murder of Adena Watson. Since Tucker has already been interviewed by police multiple times, the detectives have only one more chance to get a confession before Tucker goes free. The three men spend 12 hours in the interrogation room, nicknamed "The Box", and the detectives try multiple tactics to get him to confess, from intimidation to empathy to lying. Tucker remains adamant that he did not kill the girl, and eventually turns the table on the police by identifying their hidden insecurities. Although Tucker admits to harboring pedophilic feelings for Adena, the interview ends without a murder confession and Tucker goes free. Bayliss now questions whether Tucker was the killer at all, but Pembleton believes he was, and expresses a new respect for his partner.
7	7	"A Dog and Pony Show"	Alan Taylor	Story by : Tom Fontana; Teleplay by : James Yoshimura	March 10, 1993	107	12.4
Giardello orders Bayliss and Pembleton to move on from the Adena Watson murder and take on new cases. They are assigned to solve the murder of a police dog, which Bayliss finds a waste of time, but Pembleton decides to take seriously. Meanwhile, Howard and Felton are determined to bust drug dealer "Pony" Johnson (Geoffrey Ewing) for the torture and murder of a young woman, and eventually elicit a confession from another drug pusher (Larry Gilliard, Jr.) whose mother was also murdered by Johnson. Crosetti provides encouragement to a recovering Thormann, who feels he should have died in the hospital and is discouraged to learn his wife (Edie Falco) is pregnant. Bolander meets his girlfriend's outrageous teenage son (Stivi Paskoski) and, despite his best efforts, cannot bond with him. Giardello attends a retirement party of a retired fellow shift commander (Michael Constantine), who tells Giardello he was forced out of the job.
8	8	"And the Rockets' Dead Glare"	Peter Markle	Story by : Tom Fontana; Teleplay by : Jorge Zamacona	March 17, 1993	108	9.8
When a Chinese college student and political refugee is murdered, Lewis and Crosetti go to Washington, D.C. to question embassy officials, but find them completely uncooperative. Howard and Felton spend the day in court testifying against "Pony" Johnson. A nervous Howard nearly jeopardizes the case with procedural missteps, but she later recovers and helps prosecutor Ed Danvers (Željko Ivanek) secure a guilty verdict. Afterward, Howard accepts a date with Danvers. Pembleton is offered a promotion to the vacant shift commander position, but is asked not to tell Giardello about it. Pembleton ultimately decides not to take it and Giardello, who learns about it on his own, is disappointed Pembleton did not confide in him. As Munch and Bolander investigate a drug-related murder, Munch argues for marijuana legalization, claiming it would reduce violent crime.
9	9	"Smoke Gets in Your Eyes"	Wayne Ewing	Tom Fontana & James Yoshimura	March 24, 1993	109	10.5
Howard and Bayliss both attempt to give up smoking, which makes Felton and Pembleton fear their partners' edginess could endanger their own safety. The four nearly miss a murder suspect during a stakeout because they are consumed by a discussion about smoking. Meanwhile, Giardello uncovers a secret construction job taking place within the police department building, which the detectives were not alerted about. Giardello is furious that it may be hazardous to his squad, and he threatens to go to the media if his superiors do not implement safeguards. Bolander and Munch investigate the death of a 14-year-old boy who has been beaten with a baseball bat. They eventually learn he was killed by a teenage gang leader (Joe Fersedi) who loved the victim like a brother, but beat him as part of an initiation. Bolander is deeply disturbed by the teen's cold casualness in discussing the murder.

== Development ==
=== Conception ===
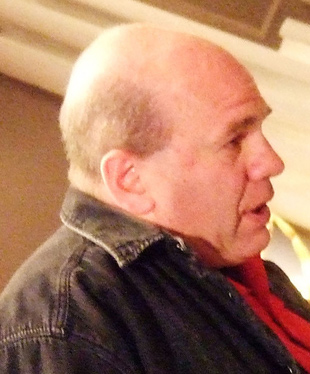
Homicide: Life on the Street was adapted from Homicide: A Year on the Killing Streets, a 1991 non-fiction book by David Simon (pictured).

Film director Barry Levinson sought to create a police drama television series based on Homicide: A Year on the Killing Streets, a 1991 non-fiction book by David Simon based on one year he spent with Baltimore Police Department homicide detectives. In addition to the book's being set in Levinson's home city of Baltimore, the director was attracted to the realistic way Simon portrayed police work and the detectives. The book contradicted many popular myths that had been built into past police dramas: it portrayed the detectives as not always getting along with each other and told stories of criminals who were not always caught or punished. It also portrayed detectives as solving cases primarily through physical evidence, witnesses and confessions, not by investigating motives like on many other police shows. Simon also sought to dispel the popular television perception that all detectives take their cases very personally and identify with their victims: in Simon's experience, homicide cases were primarily a job to the detectives, not personal. Levinson and Tom Fontana, who had past television experience as executive producer on the drama series St. Elsewhere, hired screenwriter Paul Attanasio to adapt elements of the book into the teleplay for the first episode. It was the first television script Attanasio ever wrote.

Attanasio based the characters in Homicide on the detectives featured in Simon's book. Frank Pembleton was based on Detective Harry Edgerton, although the two were so different that both the producers and detectives agreed their only true similarity was that they were black. Meldrick Lewis was only loosely based on Detective Donald Waltemeyer, and Levinson admitted Lewis did not start to become strongly developed until season three because, "I thought it'd be great to have a character who was totally unwilling to share with the people he worked with." Tim Bayliss was based on the real-life Baltimore detective Tom Pellegrini, the primary detective who investigated the 1988 slaying of 11-year-old Latonya Kim Wallace. The extremely personal approach Bayliss took in attempting to solve Adena Watson's murder, and his strong disappointment over failing to solve it, was based on the emotions Pellegrini went through in the Wallace case. Pellegrini provided advice to actor Kyle Secor about how to play the Bayliss role.

The part of John Munch was based on Jay Landsman, a practical joker who was known in his homicide unit for his morbid wit. Both Belzer and the character Munch he portrays are cynical, caustic former hippies who are so similar that Belzer declared the character "exactly as I would be if I were a cop". Stanley Bolander was inspired by Detective Donald Worden who, like his on-screen counterpart, was nicknamed "The Big Man". Ned Beatty only met Worden once before taking on the role, and he said the detective had "an uncluttered mind and a near-photographic memory". Beau Felton was based on Detective Donald Kincaid, and Felton's clashes with Pembleton were based on Kincaid's real-life strong dislike for Harry Edgerton. Kay Howard was based in part on the female Detective Bert Silver, and in part on the male Detective Rich Garvey, who experienced a real-life string of good luck in solving consecutive cases, just as Howard did in the first season.

NBC ordered a full season of Homicide: Life on the Street before a pilot episode was even produced. Planned as a mid-season replacement, the network ordered six episodes for their 1993 winter season, and then ordered another three after watching the completed pilot episode. The network had been consistently placing third behind their competitor networks ABC and CBS, and was suffering due to the loss of several successful shows in 1992, including The Cosby Show, The Golden Girls and Matlock, as well as the upcoming end of Cheers in 1993. NBC had tried appealing to audiences in their 20s through several comedies, but those efforts proved unsuccessful and the network decided to focus on high-quality dramas like Homicide. NBC Entertainment president Warren Littlefield considered it the most promising new series of the season.

=== Crew ===
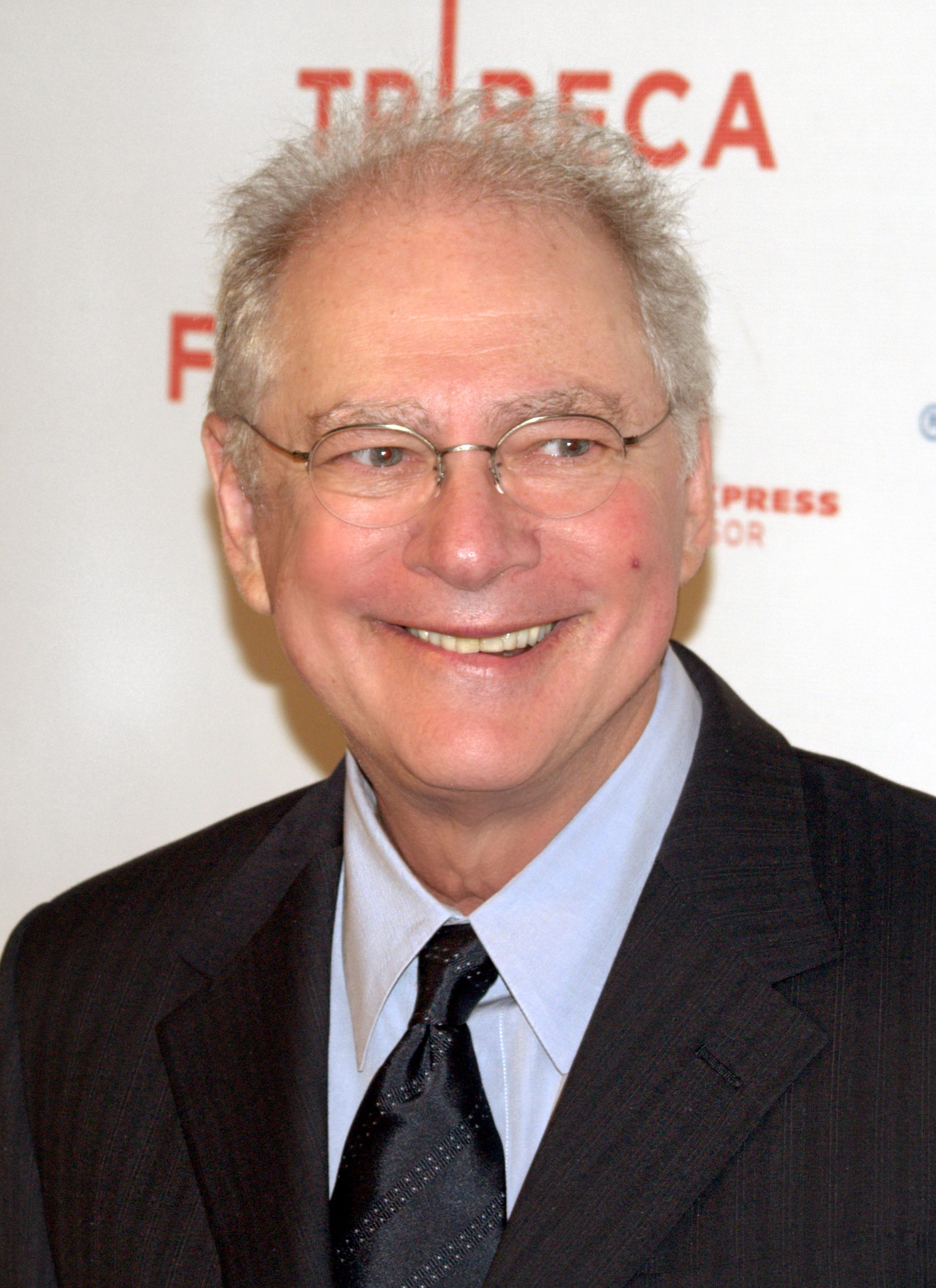
Film director Barry Levinson was executive producer of Homicide: Life on the Street.

Paul Attanasio was billed as the creator of Homicide: Life on the Street, with Barry Levinson and Tom Fontana serving as executive producers. The show was produced by Levinson's company Baltimore Pictures, which partnered with Reeves Entertainment. Wayne Ewing, who was cinematographer for Levinson's film Toys (1992), was director of photography during the first season and also directed the episode "Smoke Gets in Your Eyes".

Stan Warnow started out working as editor on the season premiere "Gone for Goode", but he departed before the process was done due to creative differences with Levinson. Tony Black finished the editing for that episode, but did not return for the rest of the season. Jay Rabinowitz worked as editor for the remaining episodes, along with editors Cindy Mollo and Richard Harkness. Van Smith designed the costumes for "Gone for Goode", but he did not return to work on subsequent episodes, where the costumes were handled by Rolande Berman.

The real-life detectives portrayed in Homicide: A Year on the Killing Streets signed waivers allowing themselves to be portrayed in the show, and some became consultants for the series. Gary D'Addario, the homicide lieutenant with the Baltimore Police Department and inspiration for the Al "Gee" Giardello character, worked as a consultant and approved the teleplays for accuracy. Fontana said of the real-life detectives' contributions: "They have great stories, and the rhythms of their different personalities are so special that it's great to have them around."

=== Cast ===
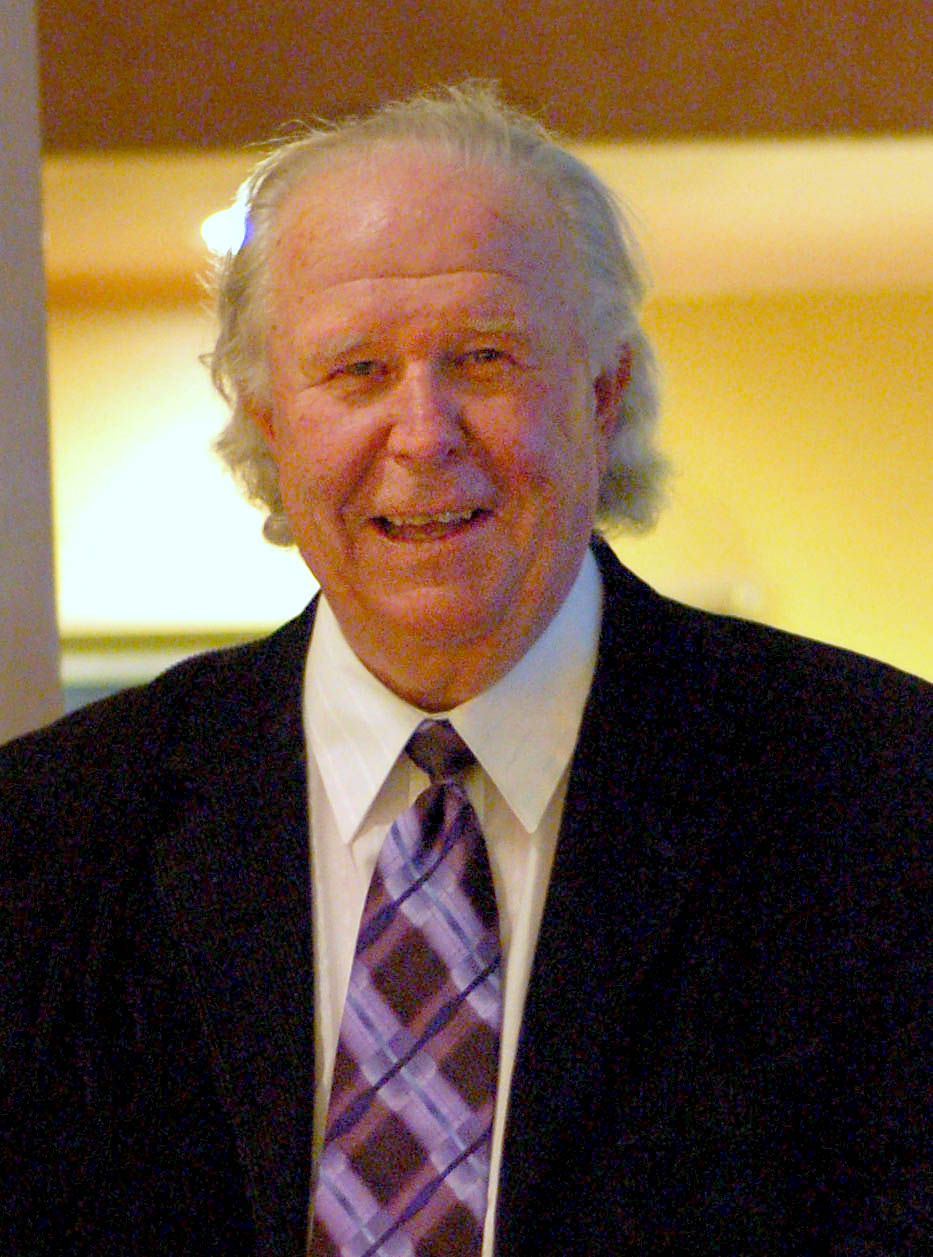
Ned Beatty, the best-known cast member when the series debuted, hesitated in accepting because he feared NBC would turn Homicide into a typical police drama.

Barry Levinson and Tom Fontana took the unusual step of basing the ethnicity and gender of the characters on the actors they cast, even though the roles were based on real-life detectives. For example, the role of Frank Pembleton, although based on the African-American Detective Harry Edgerton, was not race-specific until Andre Braugher auditioned and was cast. This impressed Braugher, who believed fully developed roles were often written for white characters and black roles were generally two-dimensional and stereotypical. This belief developed in part from Braugher's poor experience playing Detective Winston Blake on the television series Kojak, where he objected to the show's treatment of race. Ned Beatty, the best-known member of cast when the series debuted, was personally approached by Levinson and Fontana to play Stanley Bolander. Although Beatty respected the two men and liked the show, he was reluctant to take the role because he believed NBC would corrupt the series and change it to a typical police show. Beatty claimed his agents and managers "pushed, dragged and hauled" him into meeting with Levinson, but Beatty ultimately accepted the role. Kyle Secor was cast as Tim Bayliss by Fontana, who remembered the actor from his role as gay AIDS patient Bret Johnson in Fontana's previous show, St. Elsewhere.

In casting Al "Gee" Giardello, Levinson decided not to make the character Italian-American like the real-life counterpart Gary D'Addario, but rather cast Yaphet Kotto and made the character a Sicilian-African American. Kotto, who turned down two feature film offers to accept the Homicide role, was extremely impressed with Levinson's choices for the character, saying, "They had the daring to make the artistic choice without prejudice of any kind. I don't think there's another network show on the air with this sort of cast composition." Kotto struggled at first with the show's production style and constantly moving camera style, which flustered him and made him forget his lines. Levinson had to personally reassure him that he could handle the part. Clark Johnson was cast as Meldrick Lewis, and Jon Polito as his partner, Steve Crosetti. When Polito first auditioned, he read the role of a Polish cop, then did a second reading for an Irish role based on Detective Sergeant Terrence McLarney. He was cast in the McLarney role, but it was rewritten to an Italian character for Polito. The actor found working on Homicide intense and demanding, claiming, "Everybody's working so hard. This is much more of a theater atmosphere."

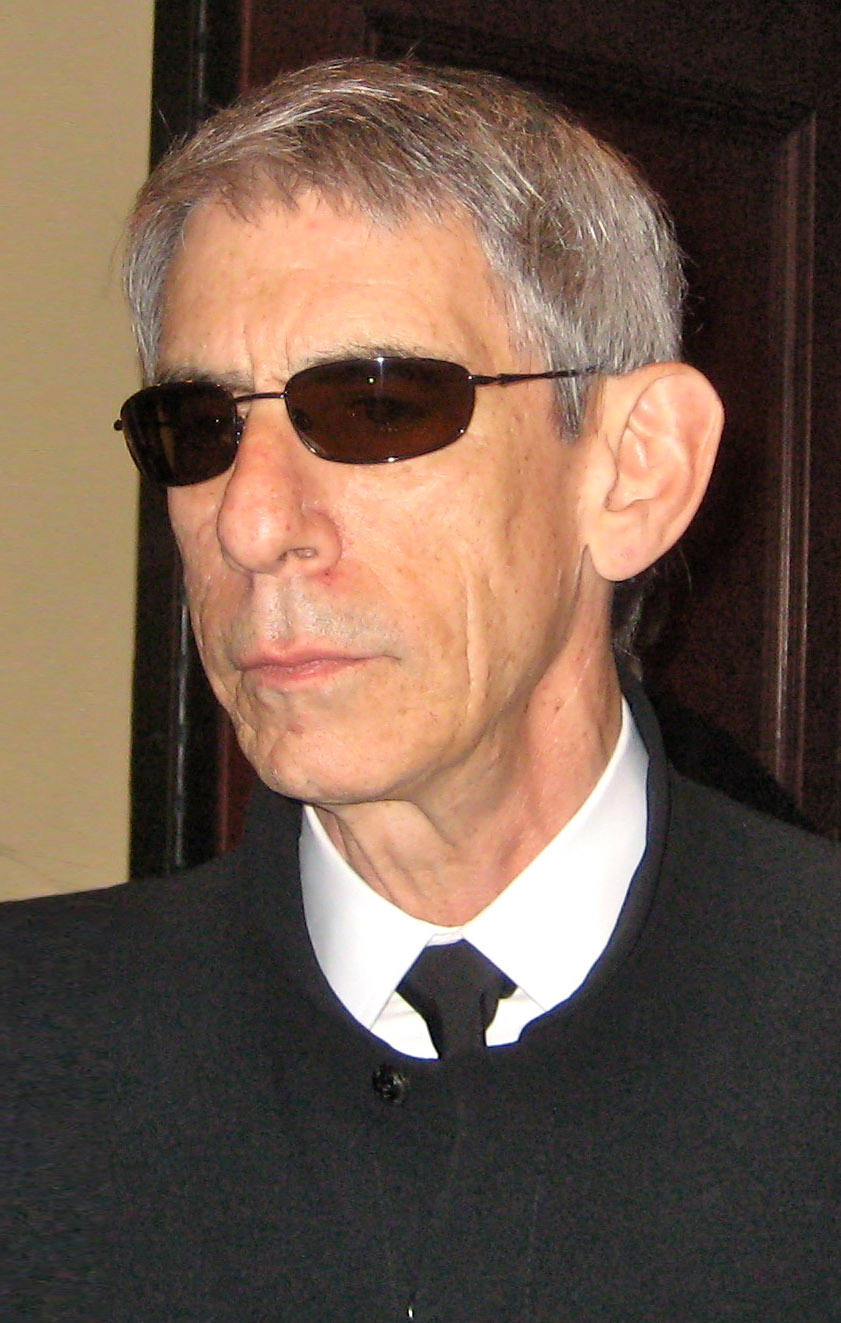
Richard Belzer earned the first of 459 credits, in 9 different television series, for the role of Detective John Munch in the first episode of Homicide.

The first Homicide season featured the first performances of Richard Belzer as Detective John Munch, a character the actor has been credited for in 459 television episodes in nine different television series, including Homicide and Law & Order: Special Victims Unit. Levinson asked Belzer to audition for the part after hearing the comedian ranting on The Howard Stern Show, where Belzer was a frequent guest. Levinson said Belzer was a "lousy actor" during his first audition with the "Gone for Goode" script. Levinson asked Belzer to take some time to reread and practice the material, then come back and read it again. During his second reading, Levinson said Belzer was "still terrible", but that the actor eventually found confidence in his performance. Daniel Baldwin was cast as Beau Felton, and dyed his naturally blond hair black for the role. Baldwin became one of the most vocal supporters of the show, giving many press interviews about it and defending it amid declining ratings. Baldwin declared, "Homicide is the best material I've had the chance to do." Melissa Leo was cast as Kay Howard, which was considered a particularly strong part compared to other female characters in police dramas at the time, which were usually limited to love interests or minor parts. While most cast members shadowed real-life Baltimore detectives to prepare for the roles, Leo did not because, she said, "I don't like to look at the horror that's in the world." Wendy Hughes was cast as medical examiner Carol Blythe.

The first season also introduced several minor characters that would make recurring appearances throughout the rest of the series. Colonel Burt Granger and Captain George Barnfather, the Baltimore Police Department bosses, were introduced in the second episode, "Ghost of a Chance". They were played, respectively, by Gerald F. Gough and Clayton LeBouef, the latter of whom later portrayed drug front worker-turned-informer Wendell "Orlando" Blocker in David Simon's other police drama, The Wire. Also introduced in "Ghost of a Chance" was prosecutor Ed Danvers, who was played by Željko Ivanek, a long-time friend of Tom Fontana. The executive producer felt Danvers was written in a dull and simple way, but felt confident Ivanek could "make it a real character". Ami Brabson, the real-life wife of actor Andre Braugher, played Mary Pembleton, the spouse of Braugher's detective counterpart character. Brabson auditioned for the role shortly after Braugher was cast in the series, and Braugher said of their on-screen pairing, "We have an instant rapport that we don't have to create." Michael Willis made his first of several appearances as defense attorney Darin Russom in the first season. Willis also later appeared in The Wire as the corrupt property developer Andy Krawczyk.

Lee Tergesen played Officer Chris Thormann, a patrolman who is shot in the head and blinded. His wife, Eva Thormann, was portrayed by Edie Falco, whom Fontana cast after watching her performance in Laws of Gravity (1992). Fontana was so impressed with Falco's work in Homicide that he later cast her in his HBO series Oz. Film and theater actor Moses Gunn's final performance before his death was as Risley Tucker, a murder suspect questioned for 12 hours by Pembleton and Bayliss in "Three Men and Adena". Several other notable actors made guest appearances throughout the first season of Homicide, including Gwen Verdon, Luis Guzmán, Paul Schulze, Walt MacPherson, Bai Ling, Lisa Gay Hamilton, Steve Harris, Alexander Chaplin, N'Bushe Wright, and Baltimore filmmaker John Waters. Larry Gilliard, Jr., who later starred as drug dealer D'Angelo Barksdale in The Wire, made a brief appearance in the Homicide episode "A Dog and Pony Show". Mel Proctor, then the home team sports announcer for the Washington Bullets, made his first of five guest performances in "Son of a Gun" as recurring reporter character Grant Besser. Detective Tom Pellegrini, the basis for the Tim Bayliss character, made an on-screen cameo in "Ghost of a Chance" as the police officer who discovered Adena Watson's body.

== Production ==
=== Writing ===
Homicide: Life on the Street was unique among police dramas for weaving multiple intricate story-lines into single episodes; the season premiere "Gone for Goode", for example, included four separate subplots. As the first season of Homicide progressed, NBC officials complained to the show's producers about the large number of subplots, but the producers resisted the pressure to scale them back until the second season. Despite intense advance promotion of the Homicide premiere due to a planned Super Bowl lead-in, Attanasio deliberately sought to introduce the show with little fanfare, avoiding sensational gimmicks in favor of character-driven plot, quirky dialogue and morbid dark humor. Homicide was noted for its deliberate lack of gun-play and car chases in favor of dialogue and story. The writers also wanted the dialogue to reflect the kinds of things detectives would talk about when not discussing murders or cases, which led to the inclusion of several scenes in which detectives talk casually among themselves during lunch or around the office. One of the "running gags" was Crosetti's obsession of the Lincoln assassination and his quest to discover the "truth" and his arguments with Lewis or anyone else willing to listen. Fontana, who compared the scenes to Levinson's 1982 film Diner, said, "That really made the show different from other shows, because we had the room to have conversations that seemingly didn't [storywise] connect anything, but they did reveal a lot about the characters."

"Gone for Goode" included several storylines, and even exact bits of dialogue, adapted straight from Homicide: A Year on the Killing Streets. One of the biggest story arcs from the first season was the murder of 11-year-old Adena Watson, which is introduced in "Gone for Goode" and lasts for five episodes until "Three Men and Adena". The case was based on the murder of 11-year-old Latonya Kim Wallace, which made up a major part of Simon's book. The Watson case, like the Wallace case, ultimately goes unsolved. A subplot from "Gone for Goode" and "Son of a Gun" involved the investigation into Calpurnia Church, an elderly woman suspected of murdering five husbands in order to collect their life insurance policies. This was based on the real-life case of Geraldine Parrish, who was also accused of killing five husbands for insurance money, and was eventually convicted for three of their murders. Another multi-episode arc involved the near-fatal shooting of Patrolman Chris Thormann, which leaves the officer blind. This was also adapted from true-life events in Simon's book, although Homicide writers added the twist of Steve Crosetti taking the case personally based on his close friendship with the victim.

Attanasio, Levinson and Fontana strove to make Homicide more realistic than other police dramas, even in minor details. For example, Levinson specifically asked that a dead body found by detectives in "Gone for Goode" be badly decomposing and attracting flies because he felt other shows did not portray corpses in a realistic way. Some episodes, like "Ghost of a Chance", focus on murders that take place in wealthy rural settings, rather than an urban or predominantly poorer location as most police dramas did. Homicide was noted for demonstrating better than most American television police shows that murders can take place in various socioeconomic circumstances. In striving for realism, some cases in Homicide remain unsolved and murderers go free, most notably in the Adena Watson case. This theme often put the show's producers at odds with NBC executives, who wanted happier endings with more closure. Fontana said of the Watson investigation, "We never solved it because we felt that it would be a disservice to the real girl, to have this fake TV solution. Because it's not O.K. that she died, that no one took responsibility."

The writers also used details from real-life criminal investigations in their script. During one scene in "Ghost of a Chance", a busload of rookie police officers straight out of the academy are brought in to investigate a crime scene. The New York Police Department employed exactly the same tactic while searching for the remains of a missing girl in upstate New York in 1987. One episode written by Tom Fontana, "Three Men and Adena", took place entirely within the confines of the police interrogation room known colloquially by the detectives as "The Box". Fontana was partially inspired to write it by comments made by Barry Levinson during filming of an interrogation scene in "Gone for Goode", when Levinson said the acting by Braugher and Secor was so good, an entire episode could be filmed around it. Fontana acknowledged a certain amount of risk in producing such an unusual episode in only the fifth week of the show, but he said, "It was important for [exec producer] Barry Levinson and I to establish that we weren't going to do the same old show every week." Multiple police departments have requested copies of "Three Men and Adena" for use in training sessions due to its accurate portrayal of the intricacies of the police interrogation process.

"Smoke Gets in Your Eyes" was originally supposed to be the first-season finale, while "Night of the Dead Living" was meant to be the third episode. However, NBC programmers felt it was too slow-paced to run so early in the season: the episode takes place entirely within the squad room and lacked traditional police drama action, which NBC executives felt was not appropriate for an early stage when the series was still trying to woo viewers. As a result, "Night of the Dead Living" was shown out of sequence and made the season finale. This created several notable continuity errors. For example, Officer Chris Thormann has not yet been shot and blinded in "Night of the Dead Living", and Tim Bayliss is still working on the Adena Watson case, which was already ended earlier in the season. These errors were addressed by Homicide producers by adding the words "One hot night, last September ..." to the beginning of the episode, thus establishing the events of the episode took place within the correct timeline of the series, even though the episodes are shown out of order.

=== Filming ===
The inaugural season of Homicide established a realistic visual style that would remain largely intact throughout the duration of the series. Among the stylistic elements were the near-constant movement with hand-held Super 16 cameras to give the show a naturalistic documentary look and an editing style involving jump cuts that was unusual for television at the time. Wayne Ewing had used Super 16 cameras while filming promotional material for Toys, and that format allowed Homicide producers to film cheaply and with a smaller crew, giving them more time to focus on the actor's performances. While filming, Levinson said he would simply allow the actors to perform while he switched back and forth between them with the hand-held camera instead of filming carefully planned shots and individual scenes from multiple angles. Levinson said the camera and editing style was partially inspired by the Jean-Luc Godard film Breathless (1960), which he would often ask his directors to watch before filming Homicide episodes.

Some individual scenes involved several jump cuts repeated several times in fast succession. Another unusual stylistic element used throughout the season involved sudden changes in jump-screen direction; a shot with an actor looking from left to right might immediately jump to another shot of the same actor looking from right to left. This process came from Levinson's insistence that the footage be edited together to include the actor's best performances. While editing "Gone for Goode", Tony Black cut together two shots that did not match and began looking for a cutaway shot he could use to disguise the edit. Levinson liked the technique that came from cutting the two conflicting shots together and insisted it stay in. This technique became commonly used throughout the series, although it was toned down in future seasons at the insistence of NBC executives who found it too unconventional.

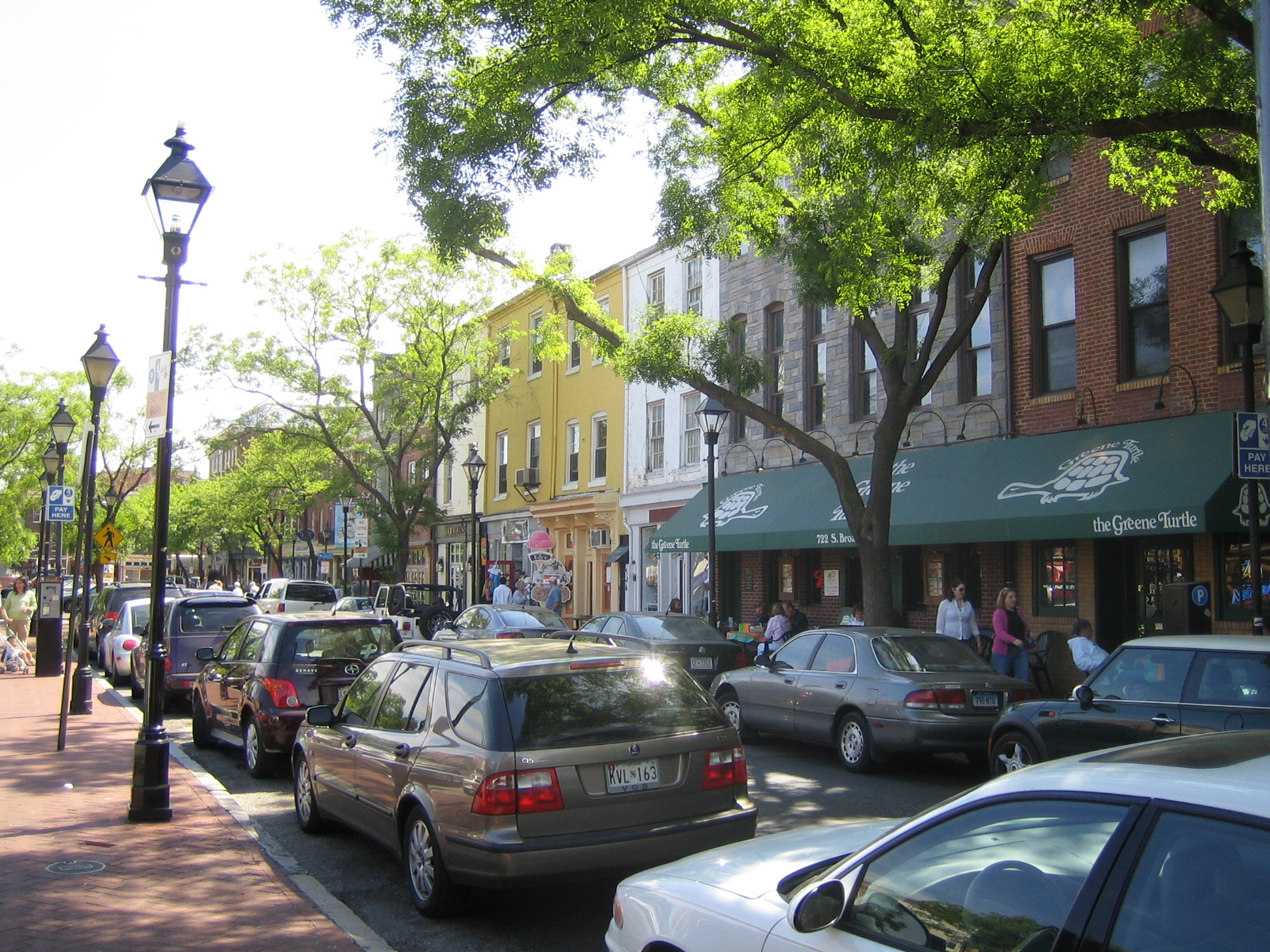
Homicide was filmed on location in Baltimore, including several locations in the neighborhood of Fells Point (pictured).

Like the rest of the series, the scenes for the first-season episodes were shot on-location in Baltimore. The use of hand-held cameras allowed the film to be shot more easily in the city, rather than on a sound-stage in Los Angeles or New York City, where most shows are typically shot. Levinson said being on location at all times allowed Baltimore "to be a character in the show". The Recreation Pier Building, a Fells Point structure built in 1914 which once housed Baltimore's marine police, was used as the set of the police department station, which was the principal set for the show. The building looked so realistic that Baltimore residents would occasionally wander into it to report actual crimes. Production director Vincent Peranino created the squad room set inside the Recreation Pier Building. While most sets include a few fake walls opposite an open space for the cameras and crew, Peranino designed the entire room as if it were a real setting, including separate areas for the detectives' coffee room and the interrogation room known as "The Box". The actors began storing their actual belongings at their desks on the set, left real personal messages to each other on the bulletin boards, and got business cards with their characters' actual names for their desks.

Many other scenes in Homicide were filmed primarily in the Fells Point neighborhood, including actual streets, bars and houses to create authenticity. Scenes at the Homicide morgue were filmed inside Baltimore's actual Office of the Medical Examiner, which the actors hated performing in due to the unsettling atmosphere; Ned Beatty said of filming there, "The one thing you can't get on camera is, oh boy, it smells." Homicide footage was transferred from film to videotape for editing at the Maryland studio Colorlab Motion Picture Services. There, Levinson and Ewing worked with colorist Drexel Williams to drain the footage of color value, leaving a gritty visual style almost reminiscent of black-and-white. This technique was downplayed starting in the second season, giving the show a more colorful look.

The opening credits for season one were developed by Mark Pellington, a director and Baltimore native. Pellington filmed the images used in the credits with an 8 mm camera to give it a gritty look. Levinson and Fontana wanted images of all the regular cast members in the credits, but wanted a different approach than the typical image of an actor looking at the camera, which they felt was a television cliche. Instead, Pellington included each of their images, but in quick close-up shots using a variety of lighting methods and camera angles; the names were only shown after the last close-up, and not in the same order. This approach was used until the beginning of the show's fifth season.

=== Music ===
The theme song for Homicide: Life on the Street was composed by Lynn F. Kowal, who submitted one of several tapes sent to the producers for consideration. Homicide producers initially had trouble finding the right song, and Levinson ultimately chose Kowal's themes because, while most of the candidates too closely resembled typical television theme songs, Levinson felt Kowal's song "had that odd quality to it, drums or whatever, and it was very unusual". Music is presented in various ways throughout the first season of Homicide. Some songs are played on radios that play in the homicide squad room, like "Lay Down My Life" by Carole King, "Texas Slide" by Jean-Jacques Milteau, "N.Y.C (Can You Believe This City?)" by Charles & Eddie, "Little Boy Blues" and "Break Up" by Gary Fitzgerald, and "Tropic Call" by Mitchell Coodley and Andrew Snitzer, all of which are featured in "Night of the Dead Living". Other songs are more integrated into the show itself, like "Hazy Shade of Blue", a Tor Hyams song that plays while the police raid several neighborhood homes in search of clues during "Ghost of a Chance", and the hymn "The Sweet By and By", which is sung at a church during Adena Watson's funeral in that same episode. Several other songs are featured in episodes throughout the first season, including "Elephant Walk" by The Kings, "The Beat Goes On" by Sonny Bono, "Going' Around in Circles" by Jules Taub, "Telephone Blues" by Sam Ling and George Smith, and "It's So Hard to Say Goodbye to Yesterday" by Freddie Perren and Christine Yarian.

== Reception ==
=== Reviews ===
Reviews were consistently positive from the beginning of the series. The Washington Post television critic Tom Shales called Homicide "the least compromised and the most intense" drama show on television, adding, "In every department, the level of excellence has been awesome." Shales complimented it for portraying the tension of a homicide squad without resorting to gratuitous violence. Harold Schindler of The Salt Lake Tribune said the series "ranks among the best programs of their kind to appear on television anywhere". He praised the acting and called the filming style "camera vérité at its best without actually becoming a documentary". Lon Grahnke of the Chicago Sun-Times called it "the season's best new series of any genre", praising it for not depending on action sequences and claiming it "has the spice, dry wit and ethnic diversity of the Hill Street Blues crew, with even more eccentricities and a heightened sense of realism". Paul Lomartire of The Palm Beach Post called it "the best new drama to come along on any network since NBC canceled Shannon's Deal". Newsday critic Marvin Kitman called Homicide "an old-fashioned NBC signature show" remnisicent of the network during the time of Grant Tinker and Brandon Tartikoff.

Associated Press writer Scott Williams praised the series as unique: "It had superb writing, a gifted cast that created complex, fully realized characters, a unique visual style, and stories of compelling power and intensity." Knight Ridder Newspapers television writer Mike Duffy praised what he called the show's witty writing, stylish visuals and superb acting, and declared it the best police drama since Hill Street Blues. The Scripps Howard News Service called Homicide "the best new drama of the season", and The Buffalo News writer Alan Pergament ranked it among the ten best television shows of 1993. Eric Kohanik of The Hamilton Spectator called it "the best new series of the midseason", and praised it for not resorting to "silly car chases [and] blazing guns". Not all reviews were positive. James Endrst, television columnist for The Hartford Courant, felt the series was over-hyped and said "seen it, done it, been there before" of the filming techniques otherwise being praised as cutting edge. In writing about "Gone for Goode", Time reviewer Richard Zoglin praised the "strong cast" and said he appreciated the lack of violence, but said, "the characters are too pat, their conflicts too predictable", particularly the rookie character Bayliss.

The New York Times writer John O'Connor praised the acting and originality of the series, which he called "simultaneously funny and harrowing". He also said Homicide occasionally gratuitously emphasized style over substance in an attempt to be original, "[as if] trying to signal, 'See how much better we are than ordinary television.'" Many commentators were impressed with the high number of strong, complex, well-developed and non-stereotypical African American characters like Pembleton, Lewis and Giardello. When the show risked facing cancellation due to poor Nielsen ratings, Benjamin Hooks, executive director of the National Association for the Advancement of Colored People, took what was considered an unusual move and wrote a letter to NBC Entertainment president Warren Littlefield urging the network not to cancel Homicide. Hooks said the show presented many positive portrayals of African Americans, as well as "a compelling and realistic rendering of today's multiracial and multicultural urban society".

"Three Men and Adena" received especially positive reviews and has been described as one of the "classic episodes" of Homicide: Life on the Street. It ranked number 74 in an Entertainment Weekly list of the 100 greatest television moments, and number 15 among the top television moments from the 1990s. David Bianculli of the New York Daily News said the episode "remains one of TV's best drama hours ever", Entertainment Weekly writer Bruce Fretts said the episode was "one of the most powerful prime-time hours ever" and literary critic John Leonard called it "the most extraordinary thing I've ever seen in a television hour". Emily Nussbaum of The New York Times called "Three Men and Adena" the standout episode of the series, and described it as "a potent showcase for the series' smartly mordant dialogue, and its willingness to explore the cliches of TV detectives instead of merely repeating them".

=== Ratings ===
The series premiered on January 31, 1993, in the time slot immediately following Super Bowl XXVII. Having consistently placed third in the Nielsen ratings during prime time since September 1992, NBC hoped a large football audience coupled with an extensive advertising campaign would allow Homicide: Life on the Street to give the network a large ratings boost. NBC ran numerous television commercials advertising the premiere episode, some of which focused on the involvement of Barry Levinson with the hope of capitalizing on the feature film director's household name. "Gone for Goode" was seen by 18.24 million household viewers, which was largest viewership of the first season, and marked the best ratings performance of a preview or premiere following a Super Bowl since The Wonder Years in 1988. Nevertheless, NBC considered it a disappointing performance based on the amount of advertising and press coverage the episode received. "Gone for Goode" received less than half the audience that the Super Bowl itself did.

We were a show the network acknowledged should never have been on at 9 and should have been at 10. It's like they said, "Let's put it in the wrong time slot and see what it'll do."

— Barry Levinson

Ratings for Homicide: Life on the Street gradually declined throughout the first season, and it ultimately finished 99th in the Nielsen ratings among network shows for the season. It aired Wednesdays at 9 p.m. EST and was consistently defeated in the ratings by a high-rating comedy block featuring Home Improvement and Coach on ABC. Barry Levinson said the scheduling was a serious detriment to Homicide which, like many other drama series at the time, was designed for a 10 p.m. time-slot. Tom Fontana also believed Homicide suffered in the ratings because it aired between Unsolved Mysteries and Law & Order, which he believed was too many police dramas for one night: "I never understood the concept of three hours of people in handcuffs as a way to entice an audience."

Viewership also suffered in part due to heavy competition in its time-slot from several major television events, such as a live Oprah Winfrey 90-minute interview with pop singer Michael Jackson on February 10, the 35th Grammy Awards ceremony on February 24, and the Sixth Annual American Comedy Awards on March 3. As the ratings declined, NBC announced to fans that a decision about whether Homicide would be renewed or canceled would depend on how the last four episodes of the season fared in the ratings. During the first week of March, the network started airing a television commercial with Barry Levinson making a direct appeal to viewers to watch the show, in which he said:

If you're wondering when we're on, remember the Michael Jackson special? We were opposite that. And when the president spoke? Pre-empted for it. And the Grammys? You got it – we were opposite that. So where are we, exactly? Well there's a show called Home Improvement – and as soon as you get there, then quickly switch to NBC.

Homicide was considered at high risk of cancellation by the end of the first season. When questioned, NBC spokesman Curt Block only said the network was "on the fence" about the series. By the time the season ended, four additional scripts had already been written, but NBC executives asked for several refinements – including fewer episode subplots and less camera movements and jump cuts – before approving a second season. Fontana said he was willing "to do anything to keep NBC from forgetting us", although Levinson said the show would maintain its realistic visual style, claiming, "We want a camera that's almost a participant in the show." Homicide was ultimately renewed, but the producers slightly toned down the show's bleak visual style and hand-held photography motif, and focused more strongly on single stories rather than multiple subplots. Tom Fontana said of the changes to the series, "We were experimenting with our first nine episodes. Whenever you try something new, you tend to err on the side of breaking ground. But we'd rather have more people watching, so the colors and lighting are slightly brighter, and the camera movements are not as jarring."

=== Awards ===
Homicide: Life on the Street won two Emmy Awards during its first season and received two additional nominations. Barry Levinson won an Emmy for Outstanding Directing for a Drama Series for his work on "Gone for Goode" and Tom Fontana won for Outstanding Writing for a Drama Series for the "Three Men and Adena" script. After winning his Emmy, Fontana made an emotional acceptance speech about the need to save the hour-long television drama, in which he said: "It's not the fault of the American public that the drama is in trouble. It's us: the writers, producers, the network executives, the studio money-crunchers. We have to figure out a way to reignite the imagination of the American people." Fontana said of the response to his speech:

I didn't think I was going to win, but I decided if they were going to give it to me, I was going to yell ... Writers told me, 'Boy, you really gave it to the producers.' Producers told me, 'Boy, you really stuck it to the networks.' The networks told me, 'Boy, you really hammered the studios.' Nobody got to the point. I was indicting all of us. What is frustrating about this is nothing has changed. Everybody wants to do everything the way it has been done 100 times before.

Mark Pellington received a Creative Arts Emmy nomination for the main title sequence of the show, and Gwen Verdon was nominated for the Emmy for Outstanding Guest Actress in a Drama Series her guest performance in "Ghost of a Chance" as Jessie Doohan, an unhappily married woman accused of killing her husband of 60 years. That same year, Verdon was also nominated for an Emmy for Outstanding Guest Actress in a Comedy Series for her performance in the series Dream On.

The first season also received other awards and nominations. Frank Pugliese and Tom Fontana won a Writers Guild of America award for Outstanding Achievement in Television Writing for Episodic Drama for the "Night of the Dead Living" teleplay. Paul Attanasio was nominated for the same award his "Gone for Goode" script. Levinson was nominated for a Directors Guild of America Award for Outstanding Direction in a Drama Series for "Gone for Goode", but lost to Gregory Hoblit for his direction of the pilot episode of the police drama NYPD Blue. Homicide was nominated for best drama series at the American Television Awards, a new awards show established in 1993 by the producers of the American Music Awards. The American Television Awards differed from the Emmys in that nominees were determined by reporters and critics rather than members of the television industry. Homicide was defeated by I'll Fly Away, an NBC drama series that was canceled in 1993.

== DVD release ==
The first and second seasons of Homicide were released together in a four-DVD box-set "Homicide: Life on the Street: The Complete Seasons 1&2", which was released by A&E Home Entertainment/NBC Entertainment on May 27, 2003. The set included an audio commentary by Barry Levinson and Tom Fontana for the "Gone for Goode" episode, as well as a collection of the commercials that advertised the episode during the Super Bowl.
