= Ghost of a Chance (Homicide: Life on the Street) =

- Homicide: Life on the Street episode
- Episode no.: Season 1 Episode 2
- Directed by: Martin Campbell
- Story by: Tom Fontana
- Teleplay by: Noel Behn
- Cinematography by: Wayne Ewing
- Production code: 102
- Original air date: February 3, 1993

Guest appearances
- Željko Ivanek as ASA Ed Danvers; Wendy Hughes as Dr. Carol Blythe; Lee Tergesen as Off. Chris Thormann; Taylor Young as Griselda Battel; Gwen Verdon as Jessie Doohen; Gerald F. Gough as Col. Burt Granger; Clayton LeBouef as Capt. George Barnfather

Episode chronology
← Previous "Gone for Goode"	Next → "Son of a Gun"
- Homicide: Life on the Street season 1

"Ghost of a Chance" is the second episode of the first season of the American police drama television series Homicide: Life on the Street. It originally aired on NBC in the United States on February 3, 1993. The teleplay was written Noel Behn based on a story by executive producer Tom Fontana, and the episode was directed by Martin Campbell. In it Bayliss begins his investigation into the murder of 11-year-old Adena Watson, Munch and Bolander investigate the unusual death of an elderly man, and Howard insists she is receiving advice about her murder case from a ghost.

The episode marked the first major developments in the Watson case, a major season one story arc based on the real-life slaying of Latonya Kim Wallace. The Wallace case was featured in David Simon's non-fiction book Homicide: A Year on the Killing Streets, from which the series was adapted. Baltimore Detective Tom Pellegrini, who handled the Wallace case, appears on-screen as a detective in "Ghost of a Chance". The episode introduced several important supporting characters, including prosecuting attorney Ed Danvers (Željko Ivanek), Colonel Burt Granger (Gerald F. Gough), Captain George Barnfather (Clayton LeBouef) and Officer Chris Thormann (Lee Tergesen).

The episode introduces the concept of a "red ball", a high-profile case that draws close media and political attention. The term would be used frequently in future episodes. It was also the first episode to feature a murder in a wealthy rural setting. At the time, most American television police shows focused on crimes in poorer neighborhoods, so "Ghost of a Chance" was noted for demonstrating that murders can take place in various socioeconomic circumstances.

The episode, seen by 9.5 million households in its original broadcast, was considered a disappointment due to the drop in viewership from the post-Super Bowl series debut, which had more than 18 million viewers. It received generally positive reviews, and was later featured in a Court TV marathon of the top 15 Homicide episodes. Gwen Verdon was nominated for an Emmy Award for her guest performance as Jessie Doohen, the woman accused of killing her husband of 60 years. The episode, along with the rest of the first and second seasons of Homicide: Life on the Street was released on DVD in the United States on May 27, 2003.

== Plot summary ==
Bayliss (Kyle Secor) is assigned as the primary detective on the murder investigation of 11-year-old Adena Watson. Being a rookie detective on his first homicide case, he has difficulty informing the family, while the veteran Pembleton (Andre Braugher) remains detached from his emotional response. Much of the Homicide unit is dedicated to the case, and Bayliss works without the benefit of his own desk. When Bayliss acts indecisively during a briefing, Gee (Yaphet Kotto) angrily orders him to show more confidence. But when a news report by journalist Griselda Battel (Taylor Young) discusses Bayliss's lack of prior experience, Gee resists pressure from his superiors to replace Bayliss, insisting, "That rookie will surprise us all."

Munch (Richard Belzer) and Bolander (Ned Beatty) arrive at the scene of a dead man named Thomas Doohen (John Habberton), only to find that the man had only fainted and is still alive. When he wakes up, Doohen immediately starts arguing with his wife Jessie (Gwen Verdon), who is unhappy with their sixty-year marriage and wishes the man were dead. Later that same day, they respond to the same house to find Doohen dead from a heart attack. Medical examiner Carol Blythe (Wendy Hughes) classifies the death as a murder because the widow dragged him into the basement and "prayed he'd stay dead," but Bolander, himself having recently left an unhappy marriage, defends the widow. Despite the disagreement, Bolander becomes smitten with Blythe and seeks romantic advice from Munch.

Prosecuting attorney Ed Danvers (Željko Ivanek) tells Howard (Melissa Leo) that if she cannot find more evidence against Ralph Fenwick (Michael Sheldon), the suspect in a brutal murder, Danvers will have to plead to manslaughter. The next day, Howard tells her partner Felton (Daniel Baldwin) she was visited by the ghost of Fenwick's victim and told where the murder weapon was, but Howard cannot find it. Felton does not believe her, and Howard grows angry when he tells Lewis (Clark Johnson) and Crosetti (Jon Polito) about the ghost experience. The next day, however, Howard and Felton arrest Fenwick after finding the murder weapon based on advice Felton got from a tarot card reader.

The Homicide unit continues investigating leads into the Adena Watson case, including an interrogation of a man who lived within walking distance of the crime scene and was previously charged with murdering a 14-year-old girl. All of the leads turn into dead ends. While investigating the Watson murder scene, police find coagulated blood and hair on a piece of metal. Reporter Griselda Battel witnesses the find but agrees to hold the information until police authorize it, as long as she gets the story first. She also tells Bayliss about a carry-out store owner who claims to know who the murderer is. The episode ends with an emotional Bayliss attending Watson's funeral.

== Production ==
"Ghost of a Chance" was written by Noel Behn based on a story by executive producer Tom Fontana, and was directed by Martin Campbell. It marked the first major developments the story arc of the Adena Watson murder case, which was introduced in the final scene of series premiere "Gone for Goode" and dominates much of the Homicide: Life on the Street first season. The Watson case was based on the real-life 1988 Baltimore slaying of Latonya Kim Wallace, which is chronicled in Homicide: A Year on the Killing Streets, the 1991 David Simon non-fiction book about a Baltimore Police Department, which was adapted into the Homicide series. "Ghost of a Chance" introduced the concept of a "red ball", which is a police jargon phrase used in the episode to describe the Adena Watson murder. A red ball is a high-profile case that draws such close media and political attention, that it diverts time and attention away from other cases in the homicide department. The phrase, which came directly from Simon's book, would be used frequently in future Homicide: Life on the Street episodes.

"Ghost of a Chance" introduced several important characters that would be regularly featured throughout the series. Among them were prosecuting attorney Ed Danvers, played by Željko Ivanek, and police department bosses Colonel Burt Granger and Captain George Barnfather, played by Gerald F. Gough and Clayton LeBouef, respectively. Ivanek was cast by his long-time friend Fontana, who thought Danvers was written in a dull and simple way, but felt confident Ivanek could "make it a real character". The episode also introduced Officer Chris Thormann (Lee Tergesen), who would become the center of a significant season one subplot in the next episode, "Son of a Gun", when he would be shot in the head during a failed arrest. Detective Tom Pellegrini, who handled the real-life Latonya Kim Wallace case and served as the basis for the Tim Bayliss character, appeared on-screen as the police officer who first discovered Adena Watson's body. Pellegrini, who was still haunted by his failure to solve the Wallace case, specifically asked to be in that scene. During filming, he stayed close to the actress who played Watson, which Secor interpreted as an attempt to make amends to the real Wallace child. Although Pellegrini personally advised Secor on his performance, the actor later said he learned more about how to play Bayliss by watching Pellegrini during that scene than anything else the detective could have told him.

In its portrayal of the possible murder of Thomas Doohen, "Ghost of a Chance" is the first Homicide episode to demonstrate a murder in a wealthy rural setting, rather than an urban or predominantly poorer location; the episode was noted for demonstrating better than most American television police shows that murders can take place in various socioeconomic circumstances. This is particularly illustrated by Munch's comment to Bolander, "Ah, green lawns, fresh air, nice houses, this is the place for a murder." The episode also maintains a common Homicide trait of combining tragedy, like the devastated response by Adena Watson's family to her murder, with scenes of dark comedy, like Jessie Doohen's claim that she endured a miserable 60-year marriage because, "We made a promise we wouldn't get a divorce until all the children were dead."

"Ghost of a Chance" marked a development of Beau Felton's character by identifying not only his trademark bullying nature, but a kinder and sweeter side of his personality. After mocking Howard publicly for her belief in ghosts, he puts in extra effort to find the killer by embracing Howard's beliefs, much to her appreciation. Howard's superstitious beliefs reappear in future episodes, particularly the fourth season episode "Heartbeat", which featured a black cat inspired by Edgar Allan Poe's short story, "The Black Cat". A scene in which a busload of rookie police officers straight out of the academy are brought in to investigate the Adena Watson crime scene was inspired by strategies used by real police departments; the New York Police Department employed exactly the same tactic while searching for the remains of a missing girl in upstate New York in 1987.

== Cultural references ==
"Ghost of a Chance" continues a common motif repeated throughout the first season of Crosetti discussing various conspiracy theories about the assassination of Abraham Lincoln, the 16th president of the United States. Crosetti said he believes the killing was arranged by the highest ranks of the Confederate States of America. Crosetti's fascination with the Lincoln assassination was based on Tom Fontana's real-life obsession with it. Throughout the episode, Lewis mournfully discussed the then-recent closing of Baltimore's Memorial Stadium. Fearing it will go to waste, Lewis wants to flood the stadium and turn it into an aquatic theme park.

The song "Hazy Shade of Blue", by songwriter Tor Hyams, plays while the police raid several neighborhood homes in search of clues and leads in the Adena Watson murder case. The hymn "The Sweet By and By", written by S. Fillmore Bennett and Joseph P. Webster, plays during Watson's funeral in the final scene of the episode. Crosetti and Lewis sing the theme song to the children's show Casper the Friendly Ghost while making fun of Howard about dreaming of ghosts.

== Reception ==
"Ghost of a Chance" originally aired on NBC in the United States on February 3, 1993, marking the show's debut in the Wednesday 9 p.m. time slot. In its original broadcast, the episode was watched by 9.5 million households, according to Nielsen Media Research. The episode received a 10.6 rating/15 share. The rating was considered a disappointment by NBC and the press, coming off of 18.8 million viewers in the series debut "Gone for Goode", which aired immediately after Super Bowl XXVII on January 31 and received generally positive reviews. "Ghost of a Chance" ranked third in its time slot for the night, The time slot winner was ABC's comedy Home Improvement, which was seen by 19.92 million viewers, the highest ever rating for the series. and ranked 60th in prime time shows for the week. "Ghost of a Chance" lost viewers from the first half hour to the second, and the episode dropped 19% in viewership among the 18-49 age group compared to "Gone for Goode". ABC's Coach earned 17.13 million viewers, while CBS's In the Heat of the Night earned 10.88 viewers. "Ghost of a Chance" also underperformed compared its predecessors in the NBC timeslot, the comedies Seinfeld and Mad About You, which averaged a combined 9.87 million viewers.

The episode received generally positive reviews. Danny Duncan of the National Catholic Reporter particularly praised the performances of Belzer, Beatty and Kotto, as well as the police relationship between Pembleton and Bayliss, which he said serves as the source of dramatic tension driving the series narrative forward in the early episodes of the first season. Eric Kohanik of The Hamilton Spectator said the episode continues to demonstrate why Homicide is "the best new series of the midseason", and praised it for not resorting to "silly car chases (and) blazing guns". Chris Kaltenbach of The Baltimore Sun complimented the episode, particularly the performances of Beatty and Verdon. Ed Siegel of The Boston Globe said he enjoyed both the humor of the episode, such as the Gwen Verdon subplot, as well as dramatic touches, like Bayliss cleaning up the spilled corn flakes of Adena Watson's despairing mother.

Not all reviews were positive. Liam Lacey said the episode was "not quite as taut" as the debut episode, particularly criticizing the ghost subplot. Lacey said, "There already appear a few cracks in the show's engaging facade, including a drift toward the Northern Exposure-style indulgent quirkiness." Time magazine reviewer Richard Zoglin said the second episode "already seems to be marking time with goofy character diversions", including Crosetti's Lincoln conspiracies and Bolander's requests for a date from Blythe. In 1999, "Ghost of a Chance" was among a Court TV marathon of the top 15 Homicide episodes, as voted on by 20,000 visitors to the channel's website.

== Emmy nomination ==
Gwen Verdon was nominated for an Emmy Award for Outstanding Guest Actress in a Drama Series her guest performance in "Ghost of a Chance". It was her second Emmy nomination in the 45th Annual Primetime Emmy Award season alone; she was also nominated for an Emmy for Outstanding Guest Actress in a Comedy Series that year for her performance in the series Dream On.

== Home media ==
"Ghost of a Chance" and the rest of the first and second-season episodes were included in the four-DVD box-set "Homicide: Life on the Street: The Complete Seasons 1 & 2", which was released by A&E Home Video on May 27, 2003 for $69.95.
