= Son of a Gun (Homicide: Life on the Street) =

- Homicide: Life on the Street episode
- Crosetti listens to jazz music in the hospital with his injured friend, Officer Thormann.
- Episode no.: Season 1 Episode 3
- Directed by: Nick Gomez
- Story by: Tom Fontana
- Teleplay by: James Yoshimura
- Cinematography by: Wayne Ewing
- Production code: 104
- Original air date: February 10, 1993

Guest appearances
- Wendy Hughes as Dr. Carol Blythe; Luis Guzmán as Lorenzo "Larry" Molera; Lee Tergesen as Off. Chris Thormann; Edie Falco as Eva Thormann; Sean Whitesell as Dr. Eli Devilbess; Mary Jefferson as Calpurnia Church; Paul Schulze as Miles Stradinger; Gerald F. Gough as Col. Burt Granger; Mel Proctor as Grant Besser; Walt MacPherson as a police officer (uncredited)

Episode chronology
← Previous "Ghost of a Chance"	Next → "A Shot in the Dark"
- Homicide: Life on the Street season 1

"Son of a Gun" is the third episode of the first season of the American police drama television series Homicide: Life on the Street. It originally aired on NBC in the United States on February 10, 1993. The teleplay was written by James Yoshimura based on a story by executive producer Tom Fontana, and the episode was directed by Nick Gomez. In the episode, recurring character Officer Thormann (Lee Tergesen) is shot while on duty, and his close friend Crosetti takes the investigation personally.

"Son of a Gun" was originally supposed to be the fourth episode of the first season, but was broadcast third when the episode "Night of the Dead Living" was moved to the end of the season. The shooting of a police officer, as well as other aspects of the script, were directly inspired by real-life events chronicled in David Simon's non-fiction book, Homicide: A Year on the Killing Streets. The episode included guest appearances by actors Luis Guzmán, Paul Schulze and Edie Falco, who played Thormann's wife. It also marked the first of five appearances by Washington Bullets team sports announcer Mel Proctor, and the first appearance by actor Walt MacPherson, who would later be cast as recurring character Detective Roger Gaffney.

"Son of a Gun" was seen by 6.52 million households in its original broadcast, continuing a downward trend in ratings since the premiere of Homicide: Life on the Street. "Son of a Gun" lost viewership in part due to competition from a live Oprah Winfrey 90-minute interview with pop singer Michael Jackson on ABC. The episode, along with the rest of the first and second seasons of Homicide: Life on the Street was released on DVD in the United States on May 27, 2003.

== Plot summary ==
Gee (Yaphet Kotto) informs the detectives that Officer Chris Thormann (Lee Tergesen) has been shot in the head, and orders an immediate investigation. Lewis (Clark Johnson) and Crosetti (Jon Polito) arrive at the hospital to find doctors working frantically on Thormann; Crosetti, a close friend of Thormann, becomes very emotional. Crosetti comforts Thormann's wife Eva (Edie Falco) but is privately told by Dr. Eli Devilbiss (Sean Whitesell) that Thormann may be blind or mentally disabled, even if he survives. Even though Gee believes Crosetti is too emotionally involved, he reluctantly agrees to give him the case after Crosetti shows him his previous gunshot wounds. When an investigation at the crime scene turns up nothing, Lewis catches Crosetti praying with a rosary in the locker room. Crosetti convinces a skeptical Lewis to pray with him for help in the investigation.

Meanwhile, Bayliss (Kyle Secor) and Pembleton (Andre Braugher) continue their investigation into the murder of 11-year-old Adena Watson. They repeatedly comb through the crime scene and conduct arrests and interrogations throughout the neighborhood, but fail to find anything new. A frustrated Bayliss snaps at Pembleton, prompting Pembleton to request a new partner, but Gee refuses and remains confident Bayliss will solve the Watson case. Elsewhere, while Bolander (Ned Beatty) prepares for a date with Blythe (Wendy Hughes), he complains to his neighbor Lorenzo Molera (Luis Guzmán) about noise he is making while performing carpentry work. The two end up bonding over beers, with both confiding in each other about their ex-wives. Inside Molera's room is a coffin he built for a customer, which Bolander insists is bad luck. His date with Blythe goes well, but he nervously rejects an invitation back to her apartment when he receives a call about a murder. The call brings him back to Molera, who has been found dead inside his coffin. Bolander tells the investigating police that Molera died of "a broken heart." Inspired by his deceased neighbor, Bolander returns to Blythe and asks to come inside after all.

While investigating a murder involving a hitman, Howard (Melissa Leo) and Felton (Daniel Baldwin) question Miles Stradinger (Paul Schulze), who serves as an arbitrator between hitmen and their customers. Stradinger gives up several of his clients, including Calpurnia Church (Mary Jefferson), a woman suspected of murdering five husbands for insurance money. Although Church denies killing anybody, the detectives find enough evidence to close many outstanding cases. Lewis, who had previously been investigating the Church case, believes his prayer with Crosetti led to her arrest. This is further upheld when Crosetti receives an anonymous call claiming a man named Alfred Smith shot Thormann. While searching for Smith, Crosetti meets a man named Charles Flavin (Larry E. Hull) who said he saw Smith shoot Thormann and will testify to it in court. The episode ends with Crosetti sitting with an unconscious Thormann in the hospital and listening to jazz music, which the two friends used to discuss frequently.

== Production ==
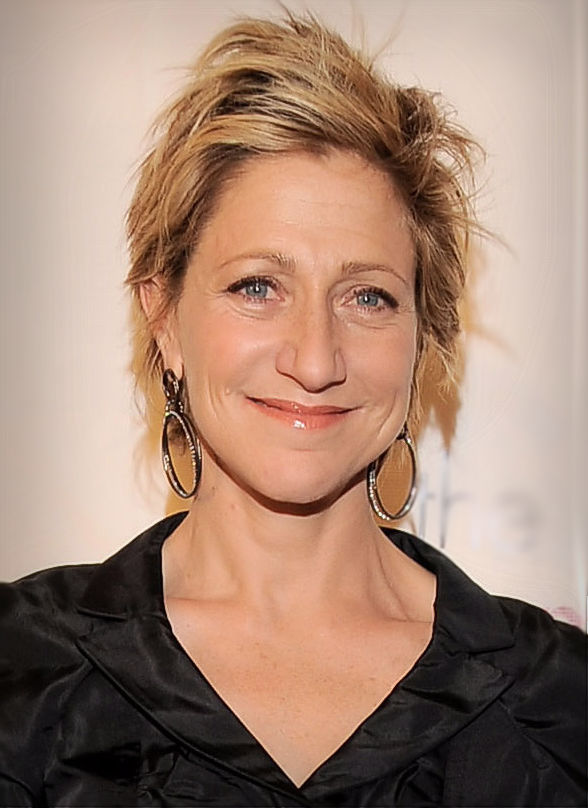
Edie Falco made a guest appearance in "Son of a Gun". Her performance inspired executive producer Tom Fontana to cast her in his HBO series, Oz.

"Son of a Gun" was written by James Yoshimura based on a story by executive producer Tom Fontana, and was directed by Nick Gomez. It was the first Homicide: Life on the Street episode written by Yoshimura, who would serve as a writer and eventually supervising producer throughout the entirety of the series. The episode featured a blending of hard-edged emotion and amusing character comedy, the combination of which would become common in future Yoshimura-penned episodes. It was originally supposed to be the fourth episode of the first season of Homicide: Life on the Street, but was broadcast third when the episode "Night of the Dead Living" was moved to the end of the season. NBC programmers were worried that the latter episode, which takes place entirely within the detective's squad room, was too deliberately paced for a series still trying to win viewers. However, as a result of the move, the Adena Watson investigation has suddenly advanced far further than it last stood in the previous episode, "Ghost of a Chance."

The episode continues the story arc of the Adena Watson murder case, which was introduced in the final scene of series premiere "Gone for Goode" and dominates much of the Homicide: Life on the Street first season. The Watson case was based on the real-life 1988 Baltimore slaying of Latonya Kim Wallace, which is chronicled in Homicide: A Year on the Killing Streets, the 1991 David Simon non-fiction book about a Baltimore Police Department, which was adapted into the Homicide series. The investigation into Calpurnia Church was inspired by the real-life case of Geraldine Parrish, which was featured in Simon's book. Parrish was accused of killing five husbands for insurance money and was eventually convicted for three of their deaths. The shooting of Officer Thormann was also adapted from true-life events in Simon's book, although Homicide writers added the twist of Crosetti taking the case personally based on his close friendship with the victim.

Edie Falco made a guest appearance in "Son of a Gun" as Officer Thormann's wife Eva. Fontana cast Falco after watching her performance in Laws of Gravity, a 1992 film also directed by Nick Gomez. Fontana said of her, "She's an actress who's unadorned by any embroidery. She does everything with such simplicity and honesty, it's breathtaking." Falco was a struggling actor at the time, and said her salary from one Homicide episode paid for one month's worth of rent. Fontana cast Falco as a regular in his HBO series Oz based on her work in the Homicide episodes.

"Son of a Gun" was also the first of five Homicide: Life on the Street episodes featuring Mel Proctor, then the home team sports announcer for the Washington Bullets, as recurring reporter character Grant Besser. Actor Walt MacPherson made a brief appearance as a uniformed police officer who finds an earring at the Adena Watson crime scene and offers it to Bayliss as possible evidence. MacPherson would return in the third season as the recurring character Detective Roger Gaffney, but there is no indication whether or not the beat cop he played in "Son of a Gun" was the same character. The line spoken by Lewis, "Murderers lie because they have to, witnesses lie because they think they have to, and everyone else lies for the sheer joy of it", is almost a verbatim line from Homicide: A Year on the Killing Streets. The line represents a three-rule theorem about police work Simon created after following a Baltimore Police Department homicide unit for one year while writing his book.

== Cultural references ==
"Son of a Gun" continues a common motif repeated throughout the first season of Crosetti discussing various conspiracy theories about the assassination of Abraham Lincoln, the 16th president of the United States. Crosetti said he believes the killing was arranged by the highest ranks of the Confederate States of America. Crosetti's fascination with the Lincoln assassination was based on Tom Fontana's real-life obsession with it. A number of songs are featured throughout the episode, including "Going' Around in Circles" by Jules Taub, "Telephone Blues" by Sam Ling and George Smith, "Something I Dreamed Last Night" by Sammy Fain, Jack Yellen and Herbert Magidson, and "It's So Hard to Say Goodbye to Yesterday" by Freddie Perren and Christine Yarian.

== Reception ==
In its original American broadcast, "Son of a Gun" was seen by 6.52 million viewers, ranking third in its time slot among major television networks. The episode received a 7 rating/10 share, which continued a downward trend in Homicide ratings since the January 31 post-Super Bowl series premiere, "Gone for Goode". "Son of a Gun" lost ratings in large part due to a live Oprah Winfrey 90-minute interview with pop singer Michael Jackson, which aired on ABC and was seen by 36.59 million people, the fourth-highest total recorded by an entertainment program at the time since 1960. Yaphet Kotto said of the scheduling, ""Heck, on that night, even I was watching Oprah instead of our show." Homicide also lost in its time slot to a cast reunion of The Andy Griffith Show, which aired on CBS and attracted 11.36 million viewers.

Lon Grahnke of the Chicago Sun-Times called the episode "outstanding" and gave it his highest possible rating of four stars. Nicholas Read of The Gazette praised "Son of a Gun" for its realism; regarding the episode's portrayal of Thormann's injuries, Read said, "For U.S. network television, it's pretty disturbing stuff. ... The series isn't afraid to show (it) in as graphic a way as network television will allow." Alex Strachan of The Vancouver Sun said it was among the "sharpest, most gruelling episodes" of Homicide. Bruce Dancis particularly complimented the performances of Jon Polito and Edie Falco, who she said "played brilliantly" in her guest role.

== Home media ==
"Son of a Gun" and the rest of the first and second-season episodes were included in the four-DVD box-set "Homicide: Life on the Street: The Complete Seasons 1 & 2", which was released by A&E Home Video on May 27, 2003, for $69.95.
