= A Shot in the Dark (Homicide: Life on the Street) =

- Homicide: Life on the Street episode
- Felton and Pembleton debate racism during a crime investigation
- Episode no.: Season 1 Episode 4
- Directed by: Bruce Paltrow
- Story by: Tom Fontana
- Teleplay by: Jorge Zamacona
- Cinematography by: Wayne Ewing
- Production code: 105
- Original air date: February 24, 1993

Guest appearances
- Željko Ivanek as ASA Ed Danvers; Wendy Hughes as Dr. Carol Blythe; Jennifer Harmon as Alison Ashley; Lee Tergesen as Off. Chris Thormann; Edie Falco as Eva Thormann; Sean Whitesell as Dr. Eli Devilbiss; Ralph Tabakin as Dr. Scheiner; Sharon Ziman as Naomi; Clayton LeBouef as Capt. George Barnfather (uncredited)

Episode chronology
← Previous "Son of a Gun"	Next → "Three Men and Adena"
- Homicide: Life on the Street season 1

"A Shot in the Dark" is the fourth episode of the first season of the American police drama television series Homicide: Life on the Street. It originally aired on NBC in the United States on February 24, 1993. The teleplay was written by Jorge Zamacona based on a story by executive producer Tom Fontana, and the episode was directed by Bruce Paltrow. In the episode, Crosetti focuses his investigation into the shooting of Officer Thormann (Lee Tergesen) on one suspect, while Lewis continues to investigate. Meanwhile, Pembleton and Bayliss pursue different leads in the murder case of 11-year-old Adena Watson.

The shooting of a police officer and the murder of a young girl were both directly inspired by real-life events chronicled in David Simon's non-fiction book, Homicide: A Year on the Killing Streets, on which the series was based. "A Shot in the Dark" continued a string of guest appearances by actress Edie Falco as Eva Thormann, the wife of Officer Thormann.

"A Shot in the Dark" was seen by 8.9 million households in its original broadcast. Although an improvement over the previous episode "Son of a Gun", the rating was considered a disappointment, continuing the show's downward trend in ratings. "A Shot in the Dark" suffered in particular due to direct competition from the 35th Grammy Awards. The episode, along with the rest of the first and second seasons of Homicide: Life on the Street was released on DVD in the United States on May 27, 2003.

== Plot summary ==
After being shot in the head during the previous episode, Officer Thormann (Lee Tergesen) has a miraculous recovery, although doctors predict he will be blind for the rest of his life. Crosetti (Jon Polito) and Lewis (Clark Johnson) question prime suspect, Alfred Smith (Mojo Gentry), who was identified by eyewitness Charles Flavin (Larry Hull) as the shooter. Crosetti, a close personal friend of Thormann, is convinced Smith is the shooter, but Lewis insists on further investigation. Lewis later learns Flavin bragged about shooting a cop the day Thormann was shot. Crosetti confronts Flavin, who nonchalantly admits to shooting Thormann in frustration because Flavin was suffering a migraine. Although the police celebrate finding Thormann's shooter, Lewis comforts a guilt-stricken Crosetti, who feels he took the case too personally and almost let the true shooter go free.

Bayliss (Kyle Secor) and Pembleton (Andre Braugher) continue their struggling investigation into the murder of 11-year-old Adena Watson. Bayliss wants to question an arabber who he maintains is the killer, but Pembleton believes that lead has already been exhausted. Pembleton instead pursues a theory posed by Felton (Daniel Baldwin) that Watson was killed one day earlier than they first believed, and rigor mortis was slowed because her body was stored in a cool place. Felton and Pembleton identify a possible suspect who lived near the murder scene, and learn his car was impounded shortly after her body was found. As they search impound lots for the car, the two detectives bicker with each other and Pembleton accuses Felton of racism. They eventually find the car but uncover no evidence linking it to Watson.

Bayliss pursues a warrant for the arabber, believing he can get a confession by confronting the suspect with secret information about a metal pipe the killer used to molest Watson. His plan is ruined, however, when Captain George Barnfather (Clayton LeBouef) tells the press about the pipe. A frustrated Bayliss yells at Barnfather and calls him a "butthead", causing Gee (Yaphet Kotto) to later convince Bayliss to apologize or risk losing the Watson case. Later that night, Pembleton tells Bayliss a lab report has revealed that smudges on Watson's dress was soot from the arabber's barn. Pembleton acknowledges Bayliss was right all along, and the two prepare to arrest the arabber.

Bolander (Ned Beatty) and Munch (Richard Belzer) investigate a double shooting in which a drug dealer was killed and another man was badly injured. During the investigation they find a high-class prostitute hiding in a nearby doghouse. After making unsuccessful advances on Bolander, she admits the drug dealer was killed by his own bodyguard, Newton Stuart (Richard Pelzman). After arresting him, Stuart says the other shooting victim used the drug dealer as a human shield. In a misguided attempt to follow his employer's orders to kill anyone who threatens him, Stuart said he shot through the drug dealer to ensure the man threatening him would also be shot.

== Production ==
"A Shot in the Dark" was written by Jorge Zamacona based on a story by executive producer Tom Fontana, and was directed by Bruce Paltrow. Paltrow, a television and feature film director, had a history of collaboration with Fontana starting with the drama series St. Elsewhere, where the two both served as producers. Paltrow told The Washington Post that Homicide "is to television what abstract expressionism is to art". "A Shot in the Dark" continues the story arc of the Adena Watson murder case, which dominates much of the Homicide: Life on the Street first season. The Watson case was based on the real-life 1988 Baltimore slaying of Latonya Kim Wallace, which is chronicled in Homicide: A Year on the Killing Streets, the 1991 David Simon non-fiction book about the Baltimore Police Department, which was adapted into the Homicide series. The animosity in the episode between Felton and Pembleton is based on the real-life Detective Donald Kincaid, who was the inspiration behind Felton, and the strong dislike Kincaid had for Edgerton, as chronicled in Simon's book.

The shooting of Officer Thormann was also adapted from true-life events in Simon's book, although Homicide writers added the twist of Crosetti taking the case personally based on his close friendship with the victim. Edie Falco made a guest appearance in "A Shot in the Dark" as Officer Thormann's wife Eva. Fontana cast Falco after watching her performance in Laws of Gravity (1992). Fontana said of her, "She's an actress who's unadorned by any embroidery. She does everything with such simplicity and honesty, it's breathtaking." Falco was a struggling actor at the time, and said her salary from one Homicide episode paid for one month's worth of rent. Fontana cast Falco as a regular in his HBO series Oz based on her work in the Homicide episodes.

The scene in which Bayliss yells at Barnfather and calls him a "butthead" was the only moment in Homicide: Life on the Street in which a detective openly criticizes the deputy commissioner, who often displays selfish and craven leadership throughout the duration of the series. As a result, David P. Kalat, author of Homicide: Life on the Street - The Unofficial Companion, called it a cathartic moment for home viewers. Those scenes were cut from the syndicated reruns when the episode was shown on Lifetime Television in 1997. "A Shot in the Dark" includes consistency errors about the Frank Pembleton character. Framed photos on Pembleton's desk include photos of his wife and apparent children, and Felton makes an offhanded joke, "Frank almost bought a dog for his wife and kid." However, it is later revealed that Pembleton has no children until the fourth season, when his wife Mary becomes pregnant.

== Cultural references ==
A number of songs are featured throughout the episode, including "It's You" by Zell Sanders, "Elephant Walk" by The Kings, "The Beat Goes On" by Sonny Bono and "Symphony No. 5" by Ludwig van Beethoven. During the closing scene, Munch sings a karaoke version of "Mack the Knife", a song by Kurt Weill.

== Release and reception ==
In its original American broadcast on February 24, 1993, "A Dog and Pony Show" was watched by 8.9 million households, according to Nielsen Media Research, earning the episode an 8.9 rating. This constituted an increase in viewership compared to the previous week's episode, "Son of a Gun", which was seen by 6.52 million household viewers. Nevertheless, Homicide ranked relatively low in the Nielsen ratings compared to other shows, ranking 65th for the week of February 22 to 28, with the CBS news magazine series 60 Minutes ranking number one with 22.8 million household viewers.

This marked a continued downward trend in Homicide viewership since the series debuted. "A Shot in the Dark" particularly suffered in the ratings because it aired at the same time as the 35th Grammy Awards ceremony on CBS. Nancy Nall of The News-Sentinel praised the episode as "fabulous". She especially complimented the performance of Richard Belzer, and said watching him sing "Mack the Knife" in karaoke was "a transcendent experience".

=== Home media ===
"Son of a Gun" and the rest of the first and second season episodes were included in the four-DVD box-set "Homicide: Life on the Street: The Complete Seasons 1 & 2", which was released by A&E Home Video on May 27, 2003 for $69.95.
