= Crosetti =

Crosetti may refer to:

- Frankie Crosetti (1910–2002), an American baseball player
- Steve Crosetti, a fictional character on Homicide: Life on the Street
- "Crosetti" (Homicide: Life on the Street episode), a 1994 television episode named after the character
