= Gone for Goode =

Pilot episode of Homicide: Life on the Street

- Homicide: Life on the Street episode
- Crosetti and Lewis investigate a crime scene in the first ever Homicide scene
- Episode no.: Season 1 Episode 1
- Directed by: Barry Levinson
- Written by: Paul Attanasio
- Cinematography by: Wayne Ewing
- Production code: 101
- Original air date: January 31, 1993

Guest appearances
- Wendy Hughes as Dr. Carol Blythe; Leonard Jackson as the cemetery manager; Steve J. Harris as Bernard; Mary Joy as Mrs. Goode; Ralph Tabakin as Dr. Scheiner; Sharon Ziman as Naomi

Episode chronology
← Previous —	Next → "Ghost of a Chance"
- Homicide: Life on the Street season 1

"Gone for Goode" or "Pilot" is the series premiere of the American police drama television series Homicide: Life on the Street. It originally aired on NBC in the United States on January 31, 1993, immediately following Super Bowl XXVII. The episode was written by series creator Paul Attanasio and directed by executive producer Barry Levinson. "Gone for Goode" introduced regular cast members Daniel Baldwin, Ned Beatty, Richard Belzer, Andre Braugher, Wendy Hughes, Clark Johnson, Yaphet Kotto, Melissa Leo, Jon Polito, and Kyle Secor.

The episode connects several subplots involving the detectives of a Baltimore Police Department homicide unit and establishes story arcs that continued through the first season. Among them are an investigation by Meldrick Lewis (Johnson) and Steve Crosetti (Polito) into a widow killing husbands for insurance money, as well as rookie Tim Bayliss (Secor) being assigned the murder of an 11-year-old girl for his first case. Both of those subplots were taken directly from Homicide: A Year on the Killing Streets, the 1991 David Simon non-fiction book from which the series was adapted.

"Gone for Goode" was seen by 18.24 million viewers, the largest viewership of the first season, although NBC was initially disappointed with the ratings. The episode received generally positive reviews upon its original broadcast. Barry Levinson won an Emmy Award for his direction in "Gone for Goode", and was nominated for a Directors Guild of America Award. Paul Attanasio received a Writers Guild of America Award nomination for the episode's script.

== Plot summary ==
The episode opens with Baltimore Police detectives Meldrick Lewis (Clark Johnson) and Steve Crosetti (Jon Polito) looking for a projectile a few yards away from the body of a man shot to death. The victim's girlfriend (Oni Faida Lampley), who was shot in the head during the incident but survived, tells police during questioning that her aunt, Calpurnia Church, hired a hit man to kill her for insurance money. The detectives learn Church previously collected life insurance from five deceased husbands. Suspecting Church of murdering her husbands, Lewis and Crosetti have the body of her most recent husband exhumed for an autopsy but reach a dead-end when it turns out the wrong body is in his grave.

Detective Beau Felton (Daniel Baldwin) hesitates to take a new murder case because he fears it will be too difficult to solve, so it is taken on by his partner, Kay Howard (Melissa Leo), who has recently experienced a perfect streak of solving eleven consecutive cases. They investigate the body of a man dead in a basement, and much to Felton's bewilderment, Howard solves the case easily. The owner of the house, Jerry Jempson (Jim Grollman), literally calls Howard at the house while she is investigating and agrees to a police interview, during which he acts extremely nervous and is eventually charged with the murder.

Detective John Munch (Richard Belzer) is reluctant to follow up on the case of murdered drug addict Jenny Goode, who was run over by a car. The case has been cold for three months, but he is guilted by his partner Stanley Bolander (Ned Beatty) into reexamining it. Munch makes no progress after speaking with the family and reexamining notes. Based on witness accounts of a man with long blond hair and a black car, Munch spends all night looking through suspect photos until he finds a man with a black car with front end damage and long black hair, but blond eyebrows. Munch and Bolander question him, believing the suspect (Joe Hansard) to have dyed his hair to change his appearance after killing the woman. He quickly confesses to having hit her accidentally while driving drunk.

Lieutenant Al "Gee" Giardello (Yaphet Kotto) tells Frank Pembleton (Andre Braugher), an excellent detective but a lone wolf, that he must work with a partner. Pembleton ends up investigating the death of a 65-year-old man with rookie detective Tim Bayliss (Kyle Secor). Bayliss initially believes the death to be a heart attack, but Pembleton correctly determines it is a murder because the man's car is missing. Police later arrest a man named Johnny (Alexander Chaplin), who is found driving the dead man's car. During interrogation, Pembleton fools Johnny into waiving his Miranda rights, then sneakily persuades him into confessing to the murder. Bayliss, although convinced of Johnny's guilt, nevertheless questions the ethics of Pembleton's approach (Reid technique), prompting Pembleton to yell angrily at him in front of the other officers. The episode ends with Bayliss responding to his first homicide as the primary detective: the brutal murder of an 11-year-old girl named Adena Watson.

== Production ==
=== Development and writing ===
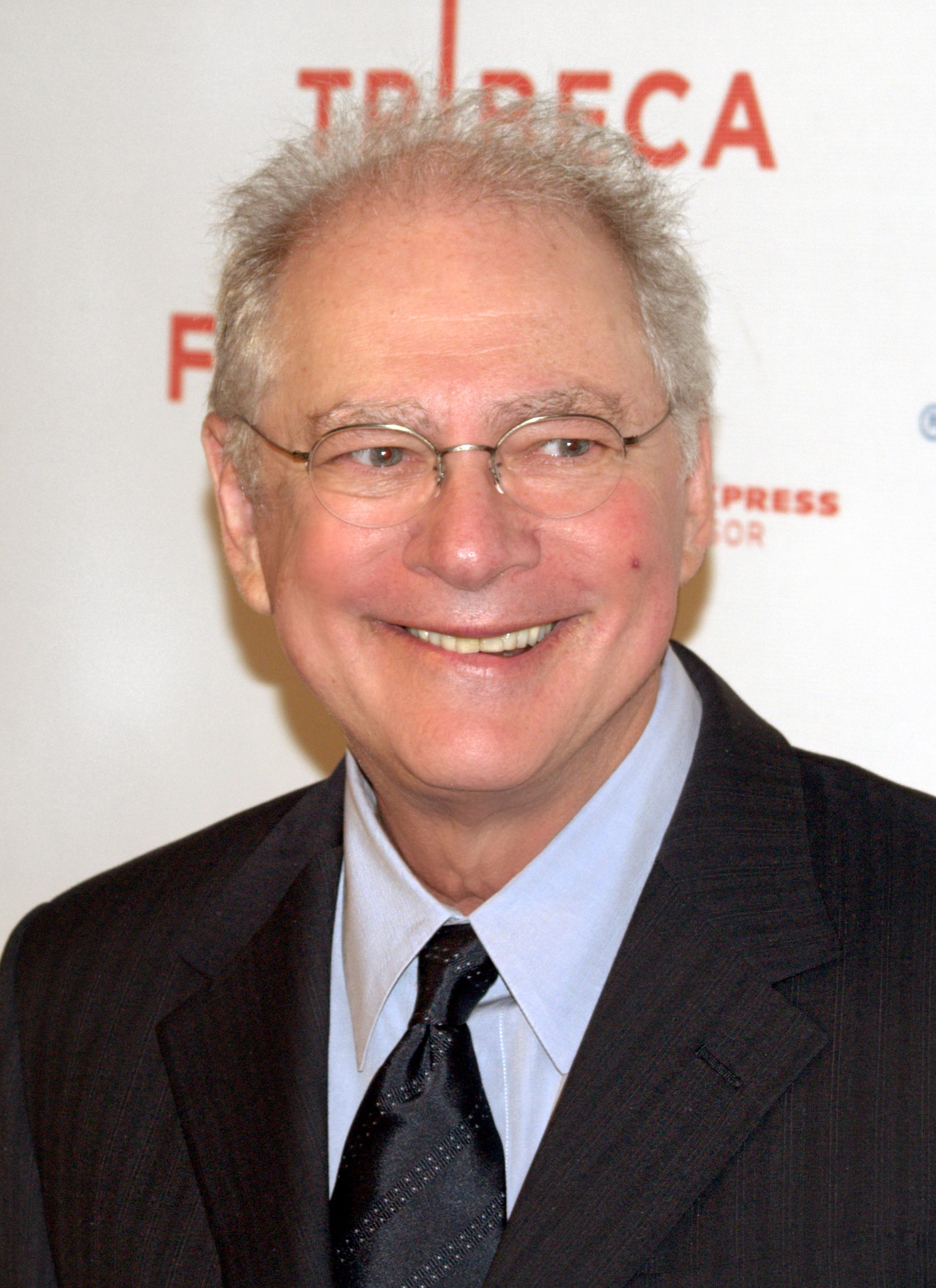
Barry Levinson, executive director of Homicide: Life on the Street, directed "Gone for Goode".

"Gone for Goode" was written by series creator Paul Attanasio and directed by executive producer Barry Levinson. Levinson was seeking to create a television series based on Homicide: A Year on the Killing Streets, a 1991 non-fiction book by David Simon based on one year he spent with Baltimore Police Department homicide detectives. Levinson and fellow executive producer Tom Fontana hired Attanasio to adapt elements of the book into the teleplay for the first episode. It was the first television script Attanasio ever wrote. The episode was shot by director of photography Wayne Ewing. Stan Warnow started out working as editor, but departed before the process was done due to creative differences with Levinson. Tony Black finished the editing for "Gone for Goode", but did not return for the rest of the season, and Jay Rabinowitz worked as editor for the remaining episodes. The costumes for the episode were designed by Van Smith, but he also did not return to work on subsequent episodes. Although it was first episode of Homicide: Life on the Street, it was not technically a television pilot because the network had already ordered a full season of episodes before "Gone for Goode" was produced. The first episode was noted at the time for weaving four separate storylines into a single episode, the first in a trend of multiple subplots in each Homicide show. NBC executives indicated to Attanasio and Levinson they would have preferred the script to focus on a single homicide case rather than four, but ultimately allowed the script to be filmed with all subplots included. Additionally, despite intense advance promotion of the Homicide premiere, Attanasio deliberately sought to introduce the show with little fanfare, avoiding sensational gimmicks in favor of character-driven plot, quirky dialogue and morbid dark humor.

"Gone for Goode" included several storylines, and even exact bits of dialogue, adapted straight from Homicide: A Year on the Killing Streets. Among them were the investigation into Calpurnia Smith, an elderly woman suspected of murdering five husbands in order to collect their life insurance policies. This was based on the real-life case of Geraldine Parrish, who was also accused of killing five husbands for insurance money, and was eventually convicted for three of their deaths. A scene involving a funeral director accidentally exhuming the wrong body while investigating the Church case mirrored a similar situation described in Homicide: A Year on the Killing Streets from the Parrish case. The Adena Watson murder case, which is assigned to Bayliss in the final scene of "Gone for Goode", was adapted from the unsolved 1988 slaying of Latonya Kim Wallace, which made up a major part of the book. The Watson case became an important story arc throughout the first season which ended without the case being solved. The hit-and-run murder of Jenny Goode was also based on Simon's book, and the murder of the elderly man was inspired by a case featured in the book in which a young homosexual man killed his elderly lover and stole his car.

Attanasio also based the characters in Homicide on the detectives featured in Simon's book. The difficulties Bayliss experienced with the case, as well as the extremely personal approach he took in attempting to solve it, were inspired by the real-life Baltimore detective Tom Pellegrini, who was the primary detective in the Wallace case. Most of the detectives featured in the Homicide book said they were happy with their on-screen counterparts, although Detective Harry Edgerton, the inspiration for Frank Pembleton, objected to a scene in "Gone for Goode" in which the character drinks milk in a bar, something Edgerton said he never does.

The episode opens with Crosetti and Lewis looking for clues in a dark alley. Levinson and Attanasio specifically wanted a dialogue-driven prologue scene that did not immediately clarify the fact that the two men were detectives or what they were looking for. The dialogue and staging of the scene were imitated in the final scene of the last Homicide episode, "Forgive Us Our Trespasses", which aired on May 21, 1999. In that final scene, Detective Rene Sheppard (played by Michael Michele) says to Lewis, "Life is a mystery, just accept it", a line spoken by Crosetti in the first episode. Lewis also said, "That's what's wrong with this job. It ain't got nothin' to do do with life", a line also spoken by Crosetti in the first episode. Early scenes in "Gone for Goode" also involved Giardello introducing rookie detective Bayliss to the homicide unit. Attanasio sought to use Bayliss' orientation as a way of introducing exposition and background about the show to the viewer as well.

In writing the script, Attanasio, Levinson and Fontana wanted the dialogue to reflect the kinds of things detectives would talk about when not discussing murders or cases, which led to the inclusion of several scenes in which detectives talk casually among themselves during lunch or around the office. Fontana, who compared the scenes to Levinson's 1982 film Diner, said, "That really made the show different from other shows, because we had the room to have conversations that seemingly didn't (storywise) connect anything, but they did reveal a lot about the characters." Levinson specifically asked that the body by Howard and Felton be badly decomposing and attracting flies because he felt other police dramas did not portray corpses in a realistic way.

=== Photography style ===
One of the discussions we had (was), 'How pretty is it supposed to look, and why does it have to look pretty? How minimalistic can we be about it, and then let that crudeness be part of our style?' And then it allowed us to shoot a show in Baltimore, be on location all the time (and) allow the city to be a character in the show.

— Barry Levinson

Levinson and Fontana sought to establish many of the stylistic elements in the episode which would define the series for its entire run. Among them were near-constant movement with hand-held Super 16 cameras to give the episode a naturalistic documentary look and an editing style involving jump cuts that was unusual for television at the time. Levinson said this camera and editing style was partially inspired by Breathless, the 1960 Jean-Luc Godard film. The scenes were shot on-location in Baltimore, as would be the case throughout the duration of the series. The use of hand-held cameras allowed the film to be shot more easily in the city, rather than on a sound-stage in Los Angeles or New York City, where most shows are typically shot. Levinson said being on location at all times allowed Baltimore "to be a character in the show".

While filming the episode, Levinson said he would simply allow the actors to perform while he switched back and forth between them with the hand-held camera instead of filming carefully planned shots and individual scenes from multiple angles. This camera style largely persisted through the end of the series in 1999. Some individual scenes involved a number of jump cuts repeated several times in fast succession. Another unusual stylistic element used in the episode involved sudden changes in jump-screen direction; a shot with an actor looking from left to right might immediately jump to another shot of the same actor looking from right to left. This process was born during the editing sessions for "Gone for Goode", where Levinson insisted that the footage be edited to include the actor's best performances. During editing, Tony Black cut together two shots that did not match and began looking for a cutaway shot he could use to disguise the edit. Levinson, however, liked the technique that came from cutting the two conflicting shots together and insisted it stay in.

In addition to stylistic touches, the episode established several narrative motifs that stayed with Homicide: Life on the Street throughout the duration of the series. Among them was the white board where detectives kept the names of their open cases in red and their closed cases in black. The names of NBC employees and friends of the Homicide crew were used on the white board. The episode was noted for its deliberate lack of gunplay and car chases in favor of dialogue and story. Levinson and Fontana also allowed humor to be incorporated into the show, particularly through the interactions between the detectives; Levinson said of the first episode, "We have to inform the audience, but at the same time you want to do it with a sense of humor so you don't seem too pretentious, in a way." Several long-standing character traits were established in "Gone for Goode", including Kay Howard's extraordinary streak of solved cases and the antagonism between Felton and Pembleton, which is demonstrated when the two argue loudly after being assigned to a case together. The animosity between Felton and Pembleton is based on the real-life Detective Donald Kincaid, who was the inspiration behind Felton, and the strong dislike Kincaid had for Harry Edgerton, as chronicled in Homicide: A Year on the Killing Streets. Howard's perfect streak is based on a similar (although shorter) lucky streak experienced by the real-life Detective Rich Garvey, who is also featured in David Simon's book.

=== Filming ===
The episode was filmed over the course of seven days in Baltimore. The scene in which Pembleton and Felton try to find the correct police car in a large garage was filmed in a rundown early 20th-century ballroom. The scene features dozens of white unmarked Cavaliers. Shortly before "Gone for Goode" was filmed, the Baltimore Police Department stopped using Cavaliers as their regular brand of police car, and agreed to sell their collection of leftover Cavaliers to the Homicide show for $1. Although the cars were used as props in the episode, only two of the cars were actually drivable. The scenes set in the medical examiner's office were filmed in the actual Office of the Chief Medical Examiner in Baltimore. The actors, particularly Jon Polito, hated performing in the morgue because they found the atmosphere unsettling. Ned Beatty said of filming there, "The one thing you can't get on camera is, oh boy, it smells." The identification pictures of suspects that Munch looks through were all pictures of photos of members of the Homicide crew. One of the final scenes in the episode, featuring Polito, Johnson and Belzer speaking in an alley at night, was conceived, written and shot in one night simply because it was raining outside, and the Homicide crew wanted to take advantage of the location during a rainy night.

Levinson said he considered the interrogation scene in "Gone for Goode" between Braugher, Secor and Chaplin, to be the "defining scene" for Frank Pembleton's character because it defined the character's intelligence, quirkiness, sharp instincts and sneaky interrogation style. While filming that scene, Levinson commented to Tom Fontana that the acting was so effective, an entire episode could be filmed revolving strictly around an interrogation. The comments partially inspired Fontana to write the first-season episode, "Three Men and Adena", which became one of the most critically acclaimed Homicide episodes. The final scene of the episode features Bayliss responding to the murder scene of Adena Watson in a rainy alleyway. The body was wrapped in a red raincoat, and Levinson worked with colorists to bleed out all the colors except that red to give the film a stark look. "Gone for Goode" originally included a scene with Gee and Bayliss discussing detective work at the police station. The scene, which was cut from the final episode, featured Gee comparing the work to challenges faced by literary character Sherlock Holmes, as well as Gee mistakenly referring to Holmes' antagonist Moriarty as "Murray".

"Gone for Goode" marks the first performance of Richard Belzer as Detective John Munch, a character the actor has played in more than 300 television episodes in a number of shows, including Homicide and Law & Order: Special Victims Unit. Levinson said Belzer was a "lousy actor" during his first audition with the "Gone for Goode" script. Levinson asked Belzer to take some time to reread and practice the material, then come back and read it again. During his second reading, Levinson said Belzer was "still terrible", but that the actor eventually found confidence in his performance. "Gone for Goode" included guest appearances by actors who later become much more widely known. Steve Harris, who later achieved fame playing Eugene Young on the ABC legal drama The Practice, played an uncooperative suspect who repeatedly lies to Munch during questioning. Alexander Chaplin, who later played speechwriter James Hobert on the ABC sitcom Spin City, portrayed the alleged murderer Johnny in "Gone for Goode". The comedic confession scenes involving Jim Grollman as accused murderer Jerry Jempson were almost entirely improvised.

The editing process for "Gone for Goode" proved difficult due to audio problems that forced producers to re-shoot several scenes. However, the cast and crew also found the atmosphere fun during editing, so much so that Barry Levinson's mother brought in home-baked snacks and the crew had to be asked to stop visiting because they were slowing down the edit sessions. When the cast finally watched the last cut of "Gone for Goode", they hugged each other in celebration.

== Cultural references ==
Throughout the episode, Crosetti discusses with Lewis various conspiracy theories about the assassination of Abraham Lincoln, the 16th president of the United States. Crosetti disputes the accepted theory that actor John Wilkes Booth killed Lincoln and instead theorizes that Jefferson Davis, the president of the Confederate States of America, organized the murder. Crosetti's assassination theories about Lincoln would be a recurring theme throughout the rest of the first season. Crosetti's fascination with the Lincoln assassination was based on Tom Fontana's real-life obsession with it. During an early scene in which a suspect tries lying to Munch, the detective berates the suspect for treating him as if he were Montel Williams instead of Larry King. King is a long-time television journalist and host of CNN's Larry King Live, whereas Williams is a more tabloid-style television show host. Williams is also a Baltimore native, which becomes a point of discussion between Munch and Bolander. Munch tells a lying suspect that his false story has an "Elmore Leonard quality", a reference to an American novelist and screenwriter.

When Munch wonders how Romans become Italians, he asks when "Friends, Romans, countrymen; lend me your ears" turned into "Hey, yo!" The former line is from the William Shakespeare play Julius Caesar. Munch says, "Great, let's arrest Axl Rose", a Guns N' Roses musician, when he is told the suspect in a murder is blond. During one scene, the detectives eat steamed crabs. This was deliberately included in the episode to reflect the culinary culture of Baltimore, where eating crabs is extremely popular. During a discussion about Pembleton, Crosetti compares him to the lone wolf character played by actor Gary Cooper in the 1952 western film High Noon; when trying to recall the title of the film, Crosetti said the character had a New York City type of attitude, prompting Lewis to believe he is referring to the 1942 baseball film The Pride of the Yankees, also starring Cooper.

== Reception ==
=== Original broadcast and ratings ===
"Gone for Goode" was scheduled to premiere on January 31, 1993, in the time slot immediately following Super Bowl XXVII. Having consistently placed third in the Nielsen ratings during prime time since September 1992, NBC hoped a large football audience coupled with an extensive advertising campaign would allow Homicide: Life on the Street to give the network a large ratings boost. The network ran numerous television commercials advertising the premiere episode, some of which focused on the involvement of Barry Levinson with the hope of capitalizing on the feature film director's household name.

"Gone for Goode" was seen by 18.24 million viewers. It earned an 18 rating, which represents the percentage of television-equipped homes, and a 31 share, which represents percentage of sets in use. This marked the best ratings performance of a preview or premiere following a Super Bowl since The Wonder Years in 1988. It was also the largest viewership of the first season, in large part due to its 10:25 p.m. time-slot immediately following the Super Bowl. Nevertheless, NBC considered it a disappointing performance, based on the amount of advertising and press coverage the episode received. The episode received less than half the audience that the Super Bowl itself did. Levinson later said the Super Bowl crowd might not have been perfectly suited to Homicide: Life on the Street. In particular, regarding the episode's complex story lines and distinctive visual style, he said, "I imagine anyone who has been drinking a lot at a Super Bowl party might have trouble following the show."

=== Reviews ===
In its first episode Homicide's sly mix of arresting cinematography, brutal, heart-tugging cases -- often infused with warped gallows humor -- and sharply written cop philosophy was fully formed.

— Kinney Littlefield,
The Orange County Register

The debut episode received generally positive reviews. Kinney Littlefield of the Orange County Register said, "One word about 'Gone for Goode' - wow." Littlefield praised the episode for dropping the viewer into the middle of an episode with complex characters and storylines without getting too confusing. People magazine reviewer David Hiltbrand called the episode "extraordinary" and gave it an A grade. He complimented the realism, the hand-held camera work and the cast, particularly Belzer. Lon Grahnke of the Chicago Sun-Times complimented the cast and praised the show for not depending on car chases or action sequences. Grahnke also said the show "has the spice, dry wit and ethnic diversity of the Hill Street Blues crew, with even more eccentricities and a heightened sense of realism". John Goff of Daily Variety said the episode was well filmed and edited, and included a strong cast with performances "above normal level of series work". Entertainment Weekly writer Bruce Fretts particularly praised Andre Braugher's performance: "It's not often you actually witness a TV star being born... The moment the galvanic actor steps onto the screen, though, he owns it." The New York Times television critic John J. O'Connor praised the performance of Jon Polito, and said the role could be "the kind of career break Joe Pesci found in the Lethal Weapon movies".

Mike Boone of The Gazette praised Belzer's performance and the hand-held camera style of photography, adding, "But if your picture tube blew Sunday night, you could still listen to an hour of the hippest, funniest dialogue on TV." Not all reviews were positive. Some critics considered the photography style of jump cuts and hand-held camera movement too jarring; some said it made them feel seasick. James Endrst, television columnist for The Hartford Courant, felt the episode was over-hyped and said "seen it, done it, been there before" of the filming techniques otherwise being praised as cutting edge. Endrst, however, praised the performances of Braugher, Belzer, Polito and Secor in particular. Time reviewer Richard Zoglin said the episode had a strong cast and that he appreciated the lack of two-dimensional violence, but said, "the characters are too pat, their conflicts too predictable", particularly the rookie character Bayliss.

"Gone for Goode" was identified by The Baltimore Sun as one of the ten best episodes of the series. Sun writer David Zurawik wrote: "'Gone for Goode' is not just a well-crafted pilot, it is one of the best in the history of the medium. It introduced a sprawling cast of complicated characters and made us want to come back and visit this world again." "Gone for Goode" was also among a 1999 Court TV marathon of the top 15 Homicide episodes, as voted on by 20,000 visitors to the channel's website.

=== Awards and nominations ===
Barry Levinson won an Emmy Award for Outstanding Directing for a Drama Series for his direction in "Gone for Goode". It was one of two Emmys Homicide: Life on the Streets received during the 45th Primetime Emmy Awards season, with Tom Fontana also winning an Emmy for Outstanding Writing for a Drama Series for the episode "Three Men and Adena". Levinson was also nominated for a Directors Guild of America Award for Outstanding Direction in a Drama Series for the episode, but lost to Gregory Hoblit for his direction of the pilot episode of the police drama NYPD Blue. Paul Attanasio was nominated for a Writers Guild of America Award for his "Gone for Goode" script. It competed in that same category with Fontana's Homicide script "Night of the Dead Living", which eventually won the award.

== Home media ==
"Gone for Goode" and the rest of the first and second-season episodes were included in the four-DVD box-set "Homicide: Life on the Street: The Complete Seasons 1 & 2", which was released by A&E Home Video on May 27, 2003, for $69.95. The set included an audio commentary by Barry Levinson and Tom Fontana for the "Gone for Goode" episode, as well as a collection of the commercials that advertised the episode during the Super Bowl.
