= Three Men and Adena =

- Homicide: Life on the Street episode
- Tucker is interrogated by Pembleton and Bayliss
- Episode no.: Season 1 Episode 6
- Directed by: Martin Campbell
- Written by: Tom Fontana
- Cinematography by: Wayne Ewing
- Production code: 106
- Original air date: March 3, 1993

Guest appearances
- Moses Gunn as Risley Tucker; Sharon Ziman as Naomi (uncredited)

Episode chronology
← Previous "A Shot in the Dark"	Next → "A Dog and Pony Show"
- Homicide: Life on the Street season 1

"Three Men and Adena" is the sixth episode of the first season of the American police drama television series Homicide: Life on the Street. It originally aired on NBC in the United States on March 3, 1993. The episode was written by executive producer Tom Fontana and directed by Martin Campbell. In the episode, Pembleton and Bayliss have a 12-hour limit to elicit a confession from Risley Tucker for the murder of 11-year-old Adena Watson. The episode takes place almost entirely within the confines of the police interrogation room with the three actors.

Tucker was played by actor Moses Gunn, in his final acting role before his death in December 1993. "Three Men and Adena" was seen by 7.08 million households in its original broadcast, which was among the lowest-rated network shows on that evening. However, the episode received positive reviews; it is considered one of the classic Homicide episodes. It ranked number 74 in an Entertainment Weekly list of the 100 greatest television moments, and ranked number 25 in a Rolling Stone list of the 100 best TV episodes of all time. Tom Fontana won an Emmy Award for Outstanding Writing for a Drama Series for the episode's script.

== Plot summary ==
Bayliss (Kyle Secor) and Pembleton (Andre Braugher) prepare to interview Risley Tucker (Moses Gunn), an elderly arabber. Bayliss is convinced Tucker murdered 11-year-old Adena Watson, but Pembleton is less confident. Since they have already interviewed Tucker multiple times, the court will not allow him to be questioned further if he does not confess after this interview; the detectives have only twelve hours to elicit a confession before Tucker walks free. Pembleton starts off acting friendly while Bayliss, who has taken the Watson case very personally, is more aggressive. Pembleton brings up Tucker's alcoholism, but Tucker said he gave up drinking sixteen months earlier because it caused blackouts. Tucker also insists he had not seen Watson for three days before she died, but Bayliss shows him she had soot on her skirt that matched soot from Tucker's barn, indicating she was there the day she was killed.

In a moment of anger, Bayliss nearly presses Tucker's face against a hot pipe on the wall, but Pembleton stops him. Tucker still angrily insists he did not kill Watson and agrees to submit to a polygraph test. When Bayliss leaves, Pembleton speaks to Tucker in a soft and comforting tone, trying to get Tucker to trust him. He suggests Tucker had a drink and blacked out the night he killed Watson, and seems close to getting a confession before Tucker once again insists he is innocent. With four hours left before the deadline, Bayliss returns and says Tucker failed the polygraph test. The detectives then aggressively team up on Tucker, talking quickly and intimidating him with repeated questions. They bring up a previously dropped statutory rape charge against Tucker involving a 14-year-old girl, then suggest he attempted to have sex with Watson and killed her when she resisted. Confronted with gruesome photos of the crime scene, a frightened and confused Tucker admits that he is no longer sure of his own innocence.

With less than an hour left and still without a confession, the detectives are exhausted, and Tucker turns the tables on them. He claims Pembleton has the attitude of a man trying to distance himself from his African-American heritage because he is ashamed to be black. Tucker also accuses Bayliss of hiding a "dark side" that he is afraid to embrace. Eventually, Tucker admits he harbored pedophilic feelings for Watson and feels shame that she was the only great love of his life. He breaks down and cries but again insists he did not kill her. The deadline passes and the detectives fail to get a confession. Tucker is released and Bayliss is miserable he was unable to close the case. Pembleton, who has a new respect for Bayliss, tries to comfort him by saying he is now convinced Tucker is the killer, but Bayliss is no longer so sure.

== Production ==
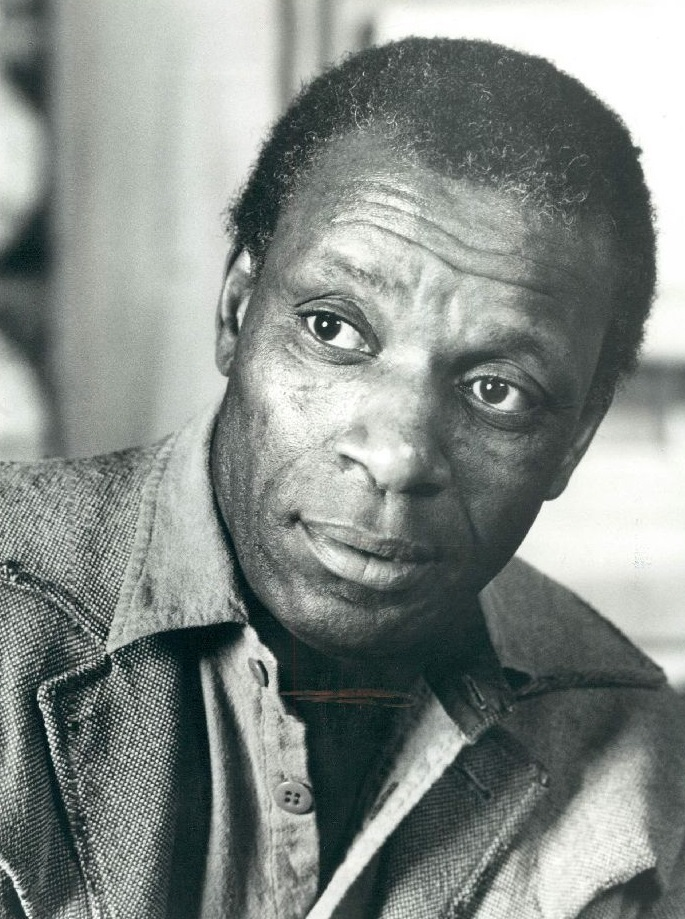
The episode was the final acting role of Moses Gunn (pictured).

"Three Men and Adena" was directed by Martin Campbell and written by Tom Fontana, executive producer of Homicide: Life on the Street. The interrogation room at the homicide division, colloquially referred to by detectives as "The Box", is a setting that appears in almost every episode of Homicide: Life on the Street. While filming an interrogation scene there in "Gone for Goode", the first episode of the first season, director Barry Levinson commented to Fontana that the acting from Andre Braugher and Kyle Secor was so effective, an entire episode could be filmed revolving strictly around an interrogation. The comments partially inspired Fontana to write "Three Men and Adena". Fontana said, "I only had the courage to write that episode based on the fact that I had seen what (Braugher and Secor) could do in the pilot episode". Almost the entire episode of "Three Men and Adena" takes place within the confines of the police interrogation room with Braugher, Secor and Moses Gunn, the actor who guest starred as Risley Tucker. It was Gunn's final acting role before his death in December 1993. Fontana acknowledged a certain amount of risk in producing such an unusual episode in only the fifth week of the show, but he said, "It was important for Barry Levinson and I to establish that we weren't going to do the same old show every week."

"Three Men and Adena" marked the conclusion of the Adena Watson murder case, a story arc that began at the start of the first season. The Watson case was based on the real-life 1988 Baltimore slaying of Latonya Kim Wallace, which is chronicled in Homicide: A Year on the Killing Streets, the 1991 David Simon non-fiction book that served as the basis of the Homicide series. Elements of the interview in "Three Men and Adena" were incorporated from real-life police interrogations in that case. The Wallace case was never solved, and Fontana insisted that the Watson case in Homicide remain unsolved as well, despite pressure from NBC for a more satisfying conclusion. Fontana said, "We never solved it because we felt that it would be a disservice to the real girl, to have this fake TV solution. Because it's not O.K. that she died, that no one took responsibility." The scene when Tucker admits for a moment he is not sure in his own mind that he didn't commit the murder was inspired by a similar real-life interaction Fontana found in a police interrogation transcript during his research. Fontana said, "It was so chilling (and) I was like, 'Oh man, how do you get there?'"

In essence, we were doing a play. We were doing a drama in which it was just as dangerous, in a certain way, as if we were on stage and it was happening right there before our very eyes. And we got a lot of very interesting, spontaneous human emotion by filming it that way, and I loved it. I absolutely adored it.

— Andre Braugher, actor

Martin Campbell spent three days of preparation on the "Box" set, analyzing it from every angle to learn the feel of the room. Fontana comes from a playwriting background, and "Three Men and Adena" involves long lengths of dialogue in a single setting, much like a play. The actors shot about 14 pages of dialogue each day, and had a very small amount of rehearsal time before shooting. According to Fontana, Campbell never shot a scene from the same angle twice, "So the entire hour keeps changing the point of view of the camera, so that you never get tired of being in that room." While filming the episode, Campbell would shoot single scenes with multiple pages of long dialogue, then film the scene again from another angle. Braugher said the experience felt more like staging a play than shooting a television episode, and allowed for a feeling of spontaneous human emotion in the performances. Although the dialogue in the final episode did not stray from the original script, Fontana said Campbell and the actors came up with the rhythm and pacing of the performances largely on their own, particularly during the fast-paced questions when Pembleton and Bayliss team up on Tucker.

The fact that Tucker goes free upholds a common theme in Homicide: Life on the Street – that life is not always fair, and that criminals sometimes get away with their crimes, a conviction that often put the show's producers at odds with NBC executives. Fontana deliberately wrote the script so that it would remain ambiguous whether Tucker committed the murder or not. He wanted the character to have a genuine feeling of love for Adena Watson, but the strong feelings do not specifically mean he killed the girl. Braugher praised Fontana for creating such a three-dimensional character in Tucker, and said, "Fontana's genius is that we are never quite certain as to what it is that we have on our hands." Fontana also wanted Pembleton and Bayliss to have different interpretations of the same interrogation; Bayliss begins the interview convinced of the man's guilt and becomes uncertain by the end, and Pembleton has the opposite experience. Multiple police departments have requested copies of "Three Men and Adena" for use in training sessions due to its accurate portrayal of the intricacies of the police interrogation process. The interrogation included several police tactics not typically featured in television dramas, including the presentation of false evidence in an attempt to get a confession.

During the opening scene of the episode, Bayliss watches the music video for "Surround", by the British band Bleach.

== Reception ==
=== Ratings ===
In its original American broadcast on March 3, 1993, "Three Men and Adena" was watched by 7.08 million households, according to Nielsen ratings. The episode received a 7.6 rating/12 share. It was among the lowest-rated major network shows from that evening, in part due to heavy competition from ABC's broadcast of the Sixth Annual American Comedy Awards, which was seen by 14.7 million households. "Three Men and Adena" was also outperformed by CBS's two-hour broadcast of In the Heat of the Night, which was seen by 11.82 million households and Fox's Beverly Hills, 90210, which was seen by 10.33 million households. Also on NBC that day, the series premiere of the new Crime and Punishment fared better than Homicide, capturing 8.47 million viewers. In the Washington, D.C.–based affiliate WRC-TV's market alone, the episode was watched by 122,166 viewers, which locally was also the lowest rating of the evening.

=== Reviews ===
"Three Men and Adena" received positive reviews and has been described as one of the "classic episodes" of Homicide: Life on the Street. "Three Men and Adena" ranked number 74 in an Entertainment Weekly list of the 100 greatest television moments, and number 15 among the top television moments from the 1990s. It was also identified by The Baltimore Sun as one of the ten best episodes of the series. Sun writer David Zurawik said Fontana's playwriting background was deeply infused in the episode, which he called a "landmark hour" that it "put (three men) and a few sticks of battle-scarred, municipal-green furniture and somehow managed to show us the human soul and the heart of darkness". Additionally, "Three Men and Adena" was among a 1999 Court TV marathon of the top 15 Homicide episodes, as voted on by 20,000 visitors to the channels website. David Bianculli of the New York Daily News said the episode "remains one of TV's best drama hours ever", and he ranked it the second-best television episode ever made, behind the Taxi episode where Reverend Jim gets his driver's license. Entertainment Weekly writer Bruce Fretts said the episode was "one of the most powerful prime-time hours ever" and called Andre Braugher's performance a "tour de police force". Alex Strachan of The Vancouver Sun described "Three Men and Adena" as "one of Homicide's finest moments". He called the episode "claustrophobic, cynical and ultimately painful" and particularly praised the performances of Braugher and Secor, and the fact that it was not a happy ending. David P. Kalat, writer of Homicide: Life on the Street: The Unofficial Companion, described the episode as "an astonishing tour de force of writing and acting that demonstrates all of Homicide's best qualities". He also praised the chemistry between Braugher and Secor, particularly when they found a common voice during the interrogation.

Rocky Mountain News critic Dusty Saunders said the episode was "as good as dramatic television gets", and showed how the quality of Homicide is anchored in strong writing and acting rather than action. John Leonard, a literary and television critic, called it "the most extraordinary thing I've ever seen in a television hour". Leonard praised the tension, the setting and the writing, particularly when Tucker turned the tables on the detectives. He said the episode was better than such works as Ariel Dorfman's Death and the Maiden and author Don DeLillo's books about men in small rooms. Lon Grahnke of the Chicago Sun-Times called it a "relentless masterpiece". Manuel Mendoza of The Dallas Morning News considered "Three Men and Adena" one of the best Homicide episodes and particularly praised the performance of Moses Gunn. Mendoza also said, "The claustrophobia of The Box contributes to the palpable tension. The Baltimore Sun television critic David Zurawik said the episode established The Box as "the main stage for Pembleton and the moral center of the Homicide universe". Zurawik also said, "Stark and minimalist, the episode was musical theater as much as television, a celebration and explosion of language; an angry, urban opera with the voices of Bayliss and Pembleton coming together and then falling back as Tucker sings a final aria of rage and contempt." Calgary Herald writer Bruce Weir said the episode "is Homicide at its finest: brilliantly written, intensely acted and continuously surprising." Emily Nussbaum of The New York Times called "Three Men and Adena" the standout episode of the series, and described it as "a potent showcase for the series' smartly mordant dialogue, and its willingness to explore the cliches of TV detectives instead of merely repeating them". Los Angeles Times writer Howard Rosenberg described it as a "mesmerizing (and) complex character study", and said Gunn delivered the best guest performance of the television season. Grant Tinker, former CEO of NBC, said of the episode, "I thought it was stunning."

=== Awards ===
Tom Fontana won an Emmy Award for Outstanding Writing for a Drama Series for his "Three Men and Adena" script. It was one of two Emmys Homicide: Life on the Street received during the 45th Primetime Emmy Awards season, with Barry Levinson also winning an Emmy for Outstanding Directing for a Drama Series for the episode "Gone for Goode".

== Home media ==
"Three Men and Adena" and the rest of the first and second season episodes were included in the four-DVD box-set "Homicide: Life on the Street: The Complete Seasons 1 & 2", which was released by A&E Home Video on May 27, 2003, for $69.95.
