= Martin Campbell =

New Zealand film and television director (born 1943)

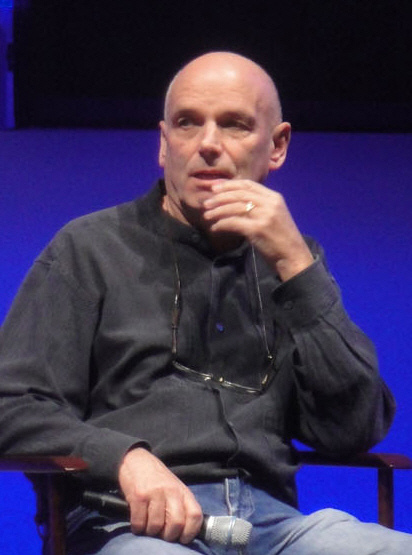
- Campbell at CES 2012
- Born: 24 October 1943 (age 83); Hastings, New Zealand
- Occupations: Director, producer
- Years active: 1973–present
- Spouse: Valarie Trapp (m. 2002; div. 2006) Sol E. Romero (m. 2006)
- Awards: BAFTA Best Director; Edge of Darkness (1985)

Martin Campbell (born 24 October 1943) is a New Zealand film and television director and producer, long based in the United Kingdom. He is best known for his works in the action and thriller film genres, including the James Bond films GoldenEye (1995) and Casino Royale (2006), The Mask of Zorro (1998) and its sequel The Legend of Zorro (2005), Vertical Limit (2000), and The Foreigner (2017).

Earlier in his career, he directed the critically acclaimed BBC drama serial Edge of Darkness (1985), which earned him a British Academy Television Award for Best Drama Series. He later directed the 2010 theatrical film adaptation of the serial.

== Life and career ==
Born in Hastings, New Zealand, Campbell moved to London in 1966, to pursue his career as a cinematographer. He began his career as a director with 1973's The Sex Thief. He went on to direct two James Bond films, 1995's GoldenEye, starring Pierce Brosnan, and 2006's Casino Royale, starring Daniel Craig. At 62 years old, Campbell was the oldest director in the series' history, beating the previous record set by Lewis Gilbert. Campbell stated that he was offered the opportunity to direct further James Bond films after GoldenEye; however, he found the plots to be limiting and only considered directing further films if working with a new Bond actor – as he subsequently did with Daniel Craig on Casino Royale.

He directed two Zorro films: The Mask of Zorro (1998) and The Legend of Zorro (2005), both starring Antonio Banderas and Catherine Zeta-Jones. Campbell also directed the 2011 film adaptation of the DC Comics superhero Green Lantern, as well as The Foreigner (2017), starring Jackie Chan.

On television, Campbell directed the film Cast a Deadly Spell and oversaw some of the more action-oriented episodes from the TV series The Professionals (1977–1983). However, his best-known work is the 1985 BBC Television drama serial Edge of Darkness, for which he won the British Academy Television Award for Best Director in 1986. Campbell also directed a 2010 movie remake of Edge of Darkness, starring Mel Gibson and Ray Winstone. Campbell directed the first episode of the American TV series Last Resort and his most recent film Cleaner released in 2025.

=== Unrealized projects ===
He almost remade El Cid (1961) under Arthur Sarkissian's deal with MGM in the 2000s.

In June 2007, Campbell was in negotiations to replace Robert Schwentke as director of the film Unstoppable (2010). Campbell was involved until March 2009, when Tony Scott came on board as director.

In October 2007, Variety reported that Naomi Watts would star in Universal's remake of Alfred Hitchcock's The Birds, to be directed by Campbell. The production was to have additionally starred George Clooney, and been a joint venture between Platinum Dunes and Mandalay Pictures. On June 16, 2009, Brad Fuller of Dimension Films stated that no further developments had taken place, commenting, "We keep trying, but I don't know." Campbell was eventually replaced as director by Platinum Dunes host Dennis Iliades in December 2009.

In July 2010, the Los Angeles Times reported that a film based on the 1980s series The Fall Guy was in development. DreamWorks Pictures had teamed up with producers Walter F. Parkes and Laurie MacDonald on the project, and Campbell was in talks to direct the film. In September 2020, Universal Pictures announced that The Fall Guy would star Ryan Gosling and be directed by David Leitch.

Campbell was initially chosen to direct Hunter Killer, but, on 2 March 2016 it was announced that Donovan Marsh would direct the film.

In 2017, it was announced that Campbell was set to direct a new adventure film, Treasure of Ali Baba & The 40 Thieves, adapted from the 1,001 Arabian Nights Tales. That year, Campbell was also attached to direct Across the River and Into the Trees, the Ernest Hemingway novel adaptation set for spring production shoot with Pierce Brosnan starring.

== Personal life ==
Martin Campbell has been married to his wife, Sol E. Romero, since 2006. Previously in 2002 he had married Valarie Trapp but they divorced in 2006.

== Filmography ==
=== Films ===
Year	Title	Notes
1973	The Sex Thief	
1975	Eskimo Nell	
1975	Three for All	
1976	Intimate Games	Uncredited
1988	Criminal Law	
1991	Defenseless	
1994	No Escape	
1995	GoldenEye	
1998	The Mask of Zorro	
2000	Vertical Limit	Also producer
2003	Beyond Borders	
2005	The Legend of Zorro	
2006	Casino Royale	Nominated—BAFTA Award for Outstanding British Film
2010	Edge of Darkness	
2011	Green Lantern	
2017	The Foreigner	
2021	The Protégé	
2022	Memory	
2024	Dirty Angels	Also writer
2025	Cleaner	
2026	Just Play Dead	

=== Television ===
Years	Title	Notes
1978–80	The Professionals	5 episodes
1980	Minder	2 episodes
1980	Shoestring	Episode "The Teddy Bears' Nightmare"
1981	Bergerac	Episode "Nice People Die in Bed"
1983	Reilly, Ace of Spies	6 episodes
1984	Charlie	4-part miniseries
1985	Edge of Darkness	6-part miniseries BAFTA TV Award for Best Drama Series/Serial
1986	Screen Two	Episode "Frankie and Johnnie"
1991	Cast a Deadly Spell	TV movie
1993	Homicide: Life on the Street	Episode "Three Men and Adena"
2003	10-8: Officers on Duty	2 episodes
2012	Last Resort	Episode "Captain"
2013	Reckless	Unaired pilot
2014	Warriors	Unaired pilot

== See also ==
- List of New Zealand film makers
