= Ed Danvers =

- Homicide: Life on the Street character
- First appearance: Ghost of a Chance
- Last appearance: Forgive Us Our Trespasses
- Created by: David Simon
- Portrayed by: Željko Ivanek

In-universe information
- Occupation: Assistant State's Attorney
- Affiliation: Office of the State's Attorney

Ed Danvers is a fictional character played by Željko Ivanek in the television series Homicide: Life on the Street. For the TV finale movie, Ivanek was promoted to the main cast.

== Character profile ==
A recurring character, Danvers is usually shown only in his professional capacity as an Assistant State's Attorney (criminal prosecutor), although the series did delve into his personal life somewhat when he engaged in a brief romance with Kay Howard. This relationship eventually ended amicably and Danvers later became engaged to an attorney for the public defender's office. A few days before the scheduled wedding, Danvers's fiancée is murdered during a botched robbery at a wedding dress shop. The homicide unit makes the case personal, illustrating how the entire unit, and Al Giardello (Yaphet Kotto) in particular, has come to think of Danvers as a member of the Homicide "family."

Danvers is usually depicted as highly dedicated and skilled, with a nearly encyclopedic knowledge of practical trial law. He is also flexible, as evidenced in the show's crossovers with Law & Order, in which his relationship with New York A.D.A. Jack McCoy (Sam Waterston) is depicted as alternately adversarial and cooperative, depending on the demands of the job.

It is revealed in "Sideshow", a Season 7 crossover with Law & Order, that, as a teenager, Danvers was a member of an all-white street gang. In 1972 Danvers participated in the racially motivated beating of an innocent African American man, but was the only one of the six gang members to show remorse for the crime. This is brought up by an Independent Counsel looking to blackmail Danvers and threaten his nomination for a judgeship. Even though Giardello and the other black officers in the Criminal Investigation Division publicly back Danvers, he loses his nomination as a result of the publicity.

A naturally quiet man, Danvers is sometimes upstaged in court by more theatrical defense attorneys. He is also not above his own prejudices, which sometimes cause him to (inadvertently) overlook overwhelming evidence. Two such instances are when he falsely assumed that his fiancée's murder was targeted rather than random (despite all evidence to the contrary) and again later when he is too quick to believe a woman's unlikely self-defense explanation for murder simply because she too is a state prosecutor; in the latter case, he even goes so far as to conspire with the defense team to minimize the defendant's sentence, although he later reverses his position when he finally realizes she had been lying. In his introductory appearance in the show's second episode, he is depicted as primarily interested in obtaining a high conviction rate so that he can move to a high-profile law firm "preferably in Los Angeles," even if that means accepting plea bargains in cases where convictions might be obtained. Danvers is also depicted as overworked, most notably in the series finale, "Forgive us our Trespasses", in which he accidentally allows serial killer Luke Ryland to go free on a technicality; the resulting tension between Danvers and homicide detective Tim Bayliss (Kyle Secor) even comes to blows before the two are able to reconcile.

Despite the fact that Homicide and the Law & Order franchise share the same continuity, Ivanek has occasionally appeared as other characters in Law & Order and its spin-offs—even sharing screen time with fellow Homicide character John Munch—with no reference to Ivanek's role as Danvers.
