= Clayton LeBouef =

American actor (born 1954)

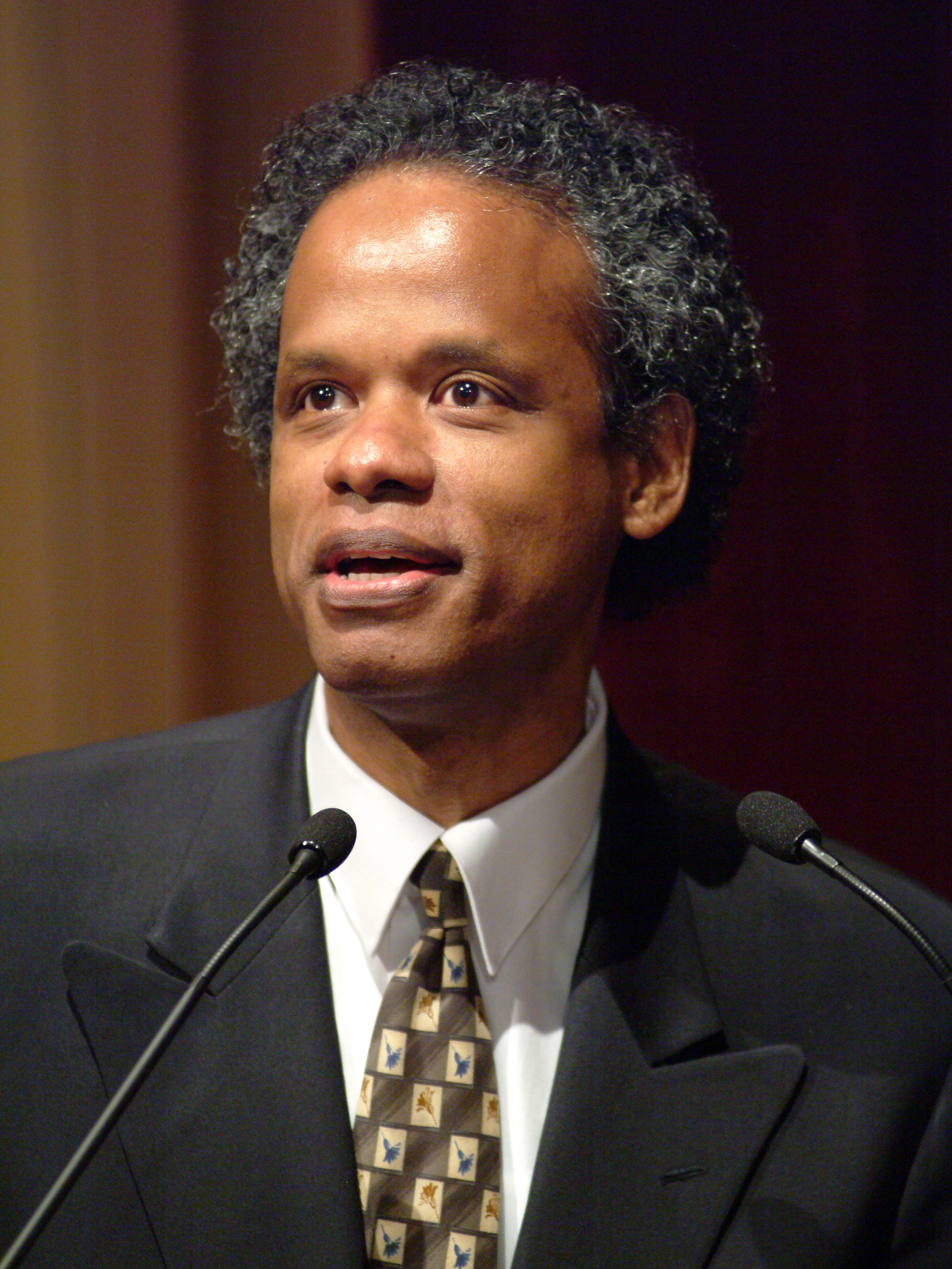
- LeBouef in 2008
- Born: November 12, 1954 (age 71); Yonkers, New York, United States
- Occupation: Actor
- Years active: 1975–present

Clayton LeBouef (born November 12, 1954) is an American actor, best known for his recurring role as Colonel George Barnfather in Homicide: Life on the Street. He appeared in several episodes during each of the show's seven seasons on the air, from 1993 to 1999, and reprised his role in Homicide: The Movie, the epilogue movie, in 2000.

== Background ==
LeBouef was born in Yonkers, New York. He performed as a theatre actor prior to his role as Captain Barnfather. He performs spoken-word pieces in addition to having authored several plays. His play Shero: The Livication of Henrietta Vinton Davis won an honorable mention at the 25th Annual Larry Neal Writers' Competition in Washington, D.C., on May 9, 2008.

In 2000, he appeared in the award-winning miniseries The Corner. In 2002, he played Wendell "Orlando" Blocker in seven episodes of The Wire.

LeBouef appeared as Harold Thomas the brother of the main character, Vivien Thomas, in the 2004 HBO movie Something the Lord Made which starred Mos Def.

From 2003 to 2005, he appeared in three episodes of Law & Order: Criminal Intent, two as the character Detective Edmunds.

His portrayal of barbershop owner Tom Taylor in the short film The Doll won him "Best Actor" honors at the San Diego Black Film Festival.

== Filmography ==
=== Film ===
Year	Title	Role	Notes
1993	The Meteor Man	Junkie	

=== Television ===
Year	Title	Role	Notes
1993–1999	Homicide: Life on the Street	George Barnfather	38 episodes
2000	Homicide: The Movie	George Barnfather	Television film
2000	The Corner	Scoogie	3 episodes
2001	Law & Order	Lawyer #1	Episode: "Teenage Wasteland"
2002	The Wire	Wendell 'Orlando' Blocker	7 episodes
2003, 2005	Law & Order: Criminal Intent	Detective Edmunds / Reggie Karter	2 episodes
2004	Law & Order: Special Victims Unit	Vernon Spiers	Episode: "Brotherhood"
2004	Something the Lord Made	Harold Thomas	Television film
2015	Show Me a Hero	Benjamin Hooks	2 episodes
