= Geraldine Parrish =

American murderer (1936–2004)

- Born: May 2, 1936; North Carolina, U.S.
- Died: Jan 1, 2004 (aged 67); Maryland, U.S.
- Penalty: Life imprisonment

Details
- Victims: 4
- Span of crimes: 1985–1988
- Country: United States
- State: Maryland
- Location: Baltimore
- Imprisoned at: Maryland Correctional Institution for Women

Geraldine Brown Parrish (1936–2004) was an American criminal and murderer. Between May 1985 and 1988, she hired two men, Edwin Gordon and Lionel Robinson, for a series of brutal insurance murders in Baltimore, Maryland. Parrish suffered from a superiority complex, as a result of which her relatives and close friends became victims of her crimes.

== Biography ==
Very little is known about Parrish's early life. She was born in rural North Carolina to a poor family with several brothers and sisters. In her youth, Parrish attended church, where she became acquainted with the basics of Catholicism. Later, she developed an interest in religions practiced by people in Central and West Africa, particularly Santería and Voodoo. In subsequent years, she studied deeper into the religious aspects and rituals, and eventually came to practice them. Since the 1970s, she presented herself as a clergy member, but no supporting evidence of her position in any religion was uncovered, and her position as an ordained minister was declared a breakaway.

== Murders ==
In the late 1970s, Parrish began to show signs of a superiority complex and exhibit deviant behavior toward friends and relatives. In the early 1980s, she developed a get rich quick scheme by receiving insurance benefits via life insurance policies. For this purpose, Parrish urged relatives, friends and acquaintances to obtain life insurance policies listing her the only beneficiary in the event of an untimely death. To get said benefits, Parrish planned several killings in the mid-1980s.

The first victim was 46-year-old Frank Lee Ross, an ex-husband of one of Parrish's sisters, who was shot dead on November 12, 1985. This murder was committed by 20-year-old Edwin Bernardo Gordon, whom Parrish paid more than $2,000 to commit the killing. On October 6, 1986, Albert Robinson and Parrish's brother Ronald Brown were killed by Lionel Robinson (no relation), and on March 6, 1987, 65-year-old Helen Wright, Parrish's housekeeper, was killed. After her death, Parrish received more than $10,000 from life insurance and social security checks. This murder was also committed by Gordon, who also received a reward of $2,000.

Six months later, Parrish arranged a plan to kill her niece, 29-year-old Dolly Brown, for whom Parrish was the beneficiary of an insurance policy worth more than $10,000. On September 19, 1987, Edwin attacked Brown and her husband, 37-year-old Ronald Mitcher, during which Mitcher was shot dead. Brown survived, and went on to survive two more attempts on her life.

== Arrest ==
After the unsuccessful attempt to kill Dolly Brown in May 1988, Edwin Gordon was arrested and began cooperating with investigators. He told them that Parrish orchestrated everything, and she was arrested later that summer. Gordon was charged with three murders, four counts of assault and conspiracy to murder, while Geraldine was charged with conspiracy to murder and contract killing. Subsequently, Parrish was suspected of committing several more murders, after it became clear that 77-year-old Rayfield Gilliard died in February 1988, 15 days after marrying her. He had left his home, money, and social benefits amounting to $440 per month in a life insurance policy, which Geraldine began receiving a month after his death. The death certificate stated that Gilliard died from a cardiovascular disease, but there was no record in his medical history that he ever had any heart problems.

== Trial and imprisonment ==
Parrish's trial began in early 1989. In May, she and Edwin Gordon pleaded guilty to organizing and committing four murders between November 1985 to May 1988, in order to receive insurance benefits in the amount of $39,000. They were also found guilty of assaulting three more people. After the conviction, Parrish received eight terms of life imprisonment, with no chance of parole. Her accomplice was also given several life imprisonment terms.

After her conviction, Parrish was sent to the Maryland Correctional Institution for Women to serve her sentence. Parrish died in custody of natural causes in 2004.
