= Steve Crosetti =

- Det. Steven "Steve" Crosetti
- First appearance: January 31, 1993 (1x01, "Gone for Goode")
- Last appearance: January 27, 1994 (2x04, "A Many Splendored Thing) (HLOTS); February 13, 2000; Homicide: The Movie
- Created by: Tom Fontana
- Portrayed by: Jon Polito

In-universe information
- Nickname: (Little Italian) Salami Brain
- Gender: Male
- Title: Detective
- Occupation: Homicide Detective (formerly)
- Spouse: Unnamed (divorced)
- Children: Beatrice (daughter)
- Nationality: Italian-American

Det. Steven Crosetti is a fictional character on the television drama series Homicide: Life on the Street portrayed by actor Jon Polito for the show's first two seasons. He is believed to be based on Baltimore Police Department Detective Sergeant Terry McLarney, who was a squad supervisor in the BPD homicide unit in David Simon's book Homicide: A Year on the Killing Streets; the character's ancestry was changed from Irish to Italian because Polito got the role.

Crosetti is a veteran police detective who is partnered with Meldrick Lewis. A deeply religious man, Crosetti is shown to have both a scapular and a rosary. In one episode, he recounts an incident several years before when he had been gunned down, hit with at least three rounds. He spent considerable time in recovery, requiring multiple operations.

As evidenced by the teleplay in "Gone for Goode" and later "Rockets' Dead Glare", Crosetti was fascinated and probably obsessed by the Lincoln assassination and rejected the belief that John Wilkes Booth was the lone assassin. In the first episode, he tells Meldrick he was up all night pondering the assassination. In "Rockets' Dead Glare", he is like a little kid when being shown Washington DC sites with any connection to Lincoln or Booth by the FBI Agent played by Ed Lauter.

A dear friend of Crosetti's, a police officer named Chris Thormann, is shot in the head while apprehending a suspect. Thormann survives, but is left blind and deeply depressed. Crosetti tries his best to help him and his wife get through it, and forces himself into the investigation. Eventually, his emotions cloud his judgment and he apprehends the wrong suspect, but Lewis eventually arrests the right one. This storyline was based on the real-life shooting and blinding of BPD Officer Gene Cassidy, and is a major part of the David Simon book which spawned the series.

Crosetti's own marriage had fallen apart sometime before the beginning of the series. He has a teenage daughter, Beatrice, whom Crosetti says "was as close to perfection as God allows." He apparently has at least joint custody. Crosetti is very protective of her, and is appalled that her mother was indifferent to the girl's having a boyfriend over to spend the night.

Crosetti is absent from the squadroom at the beginning of season 3; Lewis mentions that he has gone to Atlantic City on vacation. As weeks go by without any word from him, the detectives begin to complain about his tardiness in returning to work. In episode 6 of season 3, "Crosetti", Detectives Stanley Bolander and John Munch are called when a body is fished out of the bay. The body turns out to be Crosetti, and the initial evidence suggests a suicide. Lewis refuses to believe that Crosetti would kill himself, especially in light of his faith and his daughter. Lewis does everything he can to get the death classified a homicide, even going as far as to tell Crosetti's friends and neighbors not to give any information to Bolander (the primary detective on the case). He finally accepts the truth when he hears the medical examiner's report, which states that Crosetti had high levels of alcohol, tranquilizers, and antidepressants in his system and died by drowning. Lewis later recalls that before his vacation Crosetti had offered to give a him a childhood possession of his, a valuable vintage yo-yo, and realizes this was possibly a kind of going-away present.

Because his death was a suicide, the department refuses an honor guard at the funeral. Frank Pembleton, unwilling to attend the church funeral after his faith was shaken on a recent case, stands alone in his dress blues on the station house steps, saluting the fallen detective as the procession goes by. Lewis carries a lot of guilt over Crosetti's death, thinking back constantly to see if there had been any hint of Crosetti's suicidal tendencies beforehand. His death also deeply affects the other detectives in the squad (especially during the third season), as the reasons for Crosetti's suicide are never explained. The episode itself mentioned job stress, the divorce, and a possible gambling addiction as possible motives; but never confirmed any specific reason. The actor who played Crosetti, Jon Polito, also expressed a certain discomfort with the character's committing suicide. Because NBC aired some of the Season 3 episodes out of order, a mention of a still living Crosetti appeared after the episode that revealed the suicide. When NBC gave Tom Fontana an ultimatum of "write off Polito or this show will be cancelled", Fontana told Polito he had to do it but would bring him back later in Season 3 once the show was renewed. Polito then gave an interview where he called out Fontana and revealed spoilers on his demise, which led to a permanent estrangement with Fontana and the end of the plan to bring Polito back as a new character. Polito later apologized publicly to Fontana, stating that he didn't know the showrunner well enough at the time to know that he was a man who kept his word, and that he caused the end of his work on H:LOTS by wrongly believing Fontana was lying about the return plan.

Crosetti's final appearance is in the TV movie Homicide: The Movie, which concluded the series. Al Giardello, his shift commander, dies as a result of complications from surgery to save his life after he is shot and seriously wounded. Giardello finds himself in an afterlife version of the homicide squadroom, filled with past murder victims and police officers, and enters the break room to discover Crosetti and fellow detective Beau Felton drinking coffee and playing cards. They invite him to join the game, commenting that life is short, but that being dead is a long time.
