= List of Homicide: Life on the Street episodes =

Television series episodes

Homicide: Life on the Street is a police procedural television series that began airing on the NBC network immediately after Super Bowl XXVII on January 31, 1993, before moving to Wednesday evenings for the remainder of the first season. The show temporarily replaced L.A. Law on Thursday evenings at 10:00 p.m. ET for its limited season 2 run. From season 3 on it aired Fridays at 10:00 p.m. ET. Homicide: Life on the Street chronicled the work of a fictional Baltimore Police Department homicide unit. The show ran for seven seasons on the NBC network from 1993 to 1999, 122 episodes in all, followed by a made-for-television movie in 2000. The series was based on David Simon's nonfiction book Homicide: A Year on the Killing Streets (1991), and many characters and stories used throughout the show's seven seasons were based on individuals and events depicted in the book.

== Series overview ==
Season	Episodes	Originally released	
Season	Episodes	First released	Last released
1	9	January 31, 1993	March 31, 1993
2	4	January 6, 1994	January 27, 1994
3	20	October 14, 1994	May 5, 1995
4	22	October 20, 1995	May 17, 1996
5	22	September 20, 1996	May 16, 1997
6	23	October 17, 1997	May 8, 1998
7	22	September 25, 1998	May 21, 1999
Television film		February 13, 2000	

== Episodes ==
When first shown on network television, multiple episodes were aired out of order. The DVDs present the episodes in the correct chronological order, restoring all storylines and character developments.

=== Season 1 (1993) ===
No. overall	No. in season	Title	Directed by	Written by	Original release date	Prod. code	U.S. viewers (millions)
1	1	"Gone for Goode"	Barry Levinson	Paul Attanasio	January 31, 1993	101	28.1
2	2	"Ghost of a Chance"	Martin Campbell	Story by : Tom Fontana; Teleplay by : Noel Behn	February 3, 1993	102	14.6
3	3	"Night of the Dead Living"	Michael Lehmann	Story by : Tom Fontana & Frank Pugliese; Teleplay by : Frank Pugliese	March 31, 1993	103	9.7
4	4	"Son of a Gun"	Nick Gomez	Story by : Tom Fontana; Teleplay by : James Yoshimura	February 10, 1993	104	10.1
5	5	"A Shot in the Dark"	Bruce Paltrow	Story by : Tom Fontana; Teleplay by : Jorge Zamacona	February 24, 1993	105	12.8
6	6	"Three Men and Adena"	Martin Campbell	Tom Fontana	March 3, 1993	106	10.8
7	7	"A Dog and Pony Show"	Alan Taylor	Story by : Tom Fontana; Teleplay by : James Yoshimura	March 10, 1993	107	12.4
8	8	"And the Rockets' Dead Glare"	Peter Markle	Story by : Tom Fontana; Teleplay by : Jorge Zamacona	March 17, 1993	108	9.8
9	9	"Smoke Gets in Your Eyes"	Wayne Ewing	Tom Fontana & James Yoshimura	March 24, 1993	109	10.5

=== Season 2 (1994) ===
No. overall	No. in season	Title	Directed by	Written by	Original release date	Prod. code	U.S. viewers (millions)
10	1	"See No Evil"	Chris Menaul	Paul Attanasio	January 13, 1994	201	18.2
11	2	"Black and Blue"	Chris Menaul	Story by : Tom Fontana; Teleplay by : James Yoshimura	January 20, 1994	202	15.2
12	3	"A Many Splendored Thing"	John McNaughton	Story by : Tom Fontana; Teleplay by : Noel Behn	January 27, 1994	203	16.4
13	4	"Bop Gun"	Stephen Gyllenhaal	Story by : Tom Fontana; Teleplay by : David Simon & David Mills	January 6, 1994	204	24.9

=== Season 3 (1994–95) ===
No. overall	No. in season	Title	Directed by	Written by	Original release date	Prod. code	U.S. viewers (millions)
14	1	"Nearer My God to Thee"	Tim Hunter	Story by : Tom Fontana & Jorge Zamacona; Teleplay by : Jorge Zamacona	October 14, 1994	301	11.0
15	2	"Fits Like a Glove"	Ted Demme	Story by : Tom Fontana & Julie Martin; Teleplay by : Bonnie Mark	October 21, 1994	302	10.9
16	3	"Extreme Unction"	Keith Gordon	Story by : Tom Fontana & James Yoshimura; Teleplay by : D. Keith Mano	October 28, 1994	303	10.9
17	4	"Crosetti"	Whitney Ransick	Story by : Tom Fontana & James Yoshimura; Teleplay by : James Yoshimura	December 2, 1994	304	10.2
18	5	"The Last of the Watermen"	Richard Pearce	Tom Fontana & Henry Bromell	December 9, 1994	305	10.1
19	6	"A Model Citizen"	John McNaughton	Story by : Tom Fontana & Jorge Zamacona; Teleplay by : Noel Behn	November 11, 1994	306	9.3
20	7	"Happy to Be Here"	Lee Bonner	Story by : Tom Fontana & Julie Martin; Teleplay by : Julie Martin	November 18, 1994	307	9.3
21	8	"All Through the House"	Peter Medak	Henry Bromell	December 16, 1994	308	10.9
22	9	"Nothing Personal"	Tim Van Patten	Story by : Tom Fontana & James Yoshimura; Teleplay by : Bonnie Mark	April 21, 1995	309	11.2
23	10	"Every Mother's Son"	Kenneth Fink	Story by : Tom Fontana & James Yoshimura; Teleplay by : Eugene Lee	January 6, 1995	310	12.9
24	11	"Cradle to Grave"	Myles Connell	Story by : Tom Fontana & Jorge Zamacona; Teleplay by : David Mills	January 13, 1995	311	12.2
25	12	"Partners"	John McNaughton	Story by : Tom Fontana & Julie Martin; Teleplay by : David Rupel	January 20, 1995	312	11.4
26	13	"The City That Bleeds"	Tim Hunter	Story by : James Yoshimura & Bonnie Mark; Teleplay by : Julie Martin & Jorge Zamacona	January 27, 1995	313	14.0
27	14	"Dead End"	Whitney Ransick	Story by : James Yoshimura; Teleplay by : Julie Martin & Jorge Zamacona	February 3, 1995	314	13.1
28	15	"End Game"	Lee Bonner	Story by : James Yoshimura & Henry Bromell; Teleplay by : Rogers Turrentine	February 10, 1995	315	14.4
29	16	"Law & Disorder"	John McNaughton	Story by : James Yoshimura & Henry Bromell; Teleplay by : Bonnie Mark & Julie Martin	February 24, 1995	316	13.2
30	17	"The Old and the Dead"	Michael Fields	Story by : Henry Bromell & Jorge Zamacona; Teleplay by : Randall Anderson	March 3, 1995	317	13.4
31	18	"In Search of Crimes Past"	Kenneth Fink	Story by : Henry Bromell & Julie Martin; Teleplay by : Jane Smiley	April 14, 1995	318	11.1
32	19	"Colors"	Peter Medak	Tom Fontana	April 28, 1995	319	11.1
33	20	"The Gas Man"	Barry Levinson	Story by : Tom Fontana and Henry Bromell; Teleplay by : Henry Bromell	May 5, 1995	320	10.9

=== Season 4 (1995–96) ===
Note: On February 7, 1996, "Charm City", the 13th episode of Law & Order's sixth season, aired before the next episode of Homicide to air, "For God and Country", which directly followed the events of that episode.

No. overall	No. in season	Title	Directed by	Written by	Original release date	Prod. code	U.S. viewers (millions)
34	1	"Fire, Part 1"	Tim Hunter	Story by : Tom Fontana & Henry Bromell; Teleplay by : Julie Martin	October 20, 1995	401	13.0
35	2	"Fire, Part 2"	Nick Gomez	Story by : Henry Bromell & Tom Fontana; Teleplay by : Jack Behr	October 27, 1995	402	14.1
36	3	"Autofocus"	Alan Taylor	Story by : Tom Fontana & Henry Bromell; Teleplay by : Bonnie Mark	November 3, 1995	403	12.9
37	4	"A Doll's Eyes"	Kenneth Fink	Story by : Tom Fontana & Henry Bromell; Teleplay by : James Yoshimura	December 1, 1995	404	13.9
38	5	"Heartbeat"	Bruno Kirby	Story by : Henry Bromell and Tom Fontana; Teleplay by : Kevin Arkadie	December 8, 1995	405	12.8
39	6	"Hate Crimes"	Peter Weller	James Yoshimura and Tom Fontana	November 17, 1995	406	12.7
40	7	"Thrill of the Kill"	Tim Hunter	Story by : Tom Fontana & Henry Bromell; Teleplay by : Jorge Zamacona	November 10, 1995	407	13.0
41	8	"Sniper: Part 1"	Jean de Segonzac	Story by : Henry Bromell & Tom Fontana; Teleplay by : Jean Gennis & Phyliss Murphy	January 5, 1996	408	13.4
42	9	"Sniper: Part 2"	Darnell Martin	Story by : Henry Bromell & Tom Fontana; Teleplay by : Edward Gold	January 12, 1996	409	14.1
43	10	"Full Moon"	Leslie Libman & Larry Williams	Story by : Tom Fontana & Henry Bromell & Eric Overmeyer; Teleplay by : Eric Overmeyer	April 5, 1996	410	11.4
44	11	"For God and Country"	Ed Sherin	Jorge Zamacona & Michael S. Chernuchin	February 9, 1996	411	16.7
45	12	"The Hat"	Peter Medak	Story by : Henry Bromell & Trish Soodik and Tom Fontana; Teleplay by : Anya Epstein	January 19, 1996	412	13.8
46	13	"I've Got a Secret"	Gwen Arner	Story by : Tom Fontana & Henry Bromell; Teleplay by : D. Maria Legaspi	February 2, 1996	413	14.5
47	14	"Justice: Part 1"	Michael Radford	Story by : Tom Fontana & Henry Bromell; Teleplay by : David Rupel	February 16, 1996	414	13.3
48	15	"Justice: Part 2"	Peter Medak	Story by : Tom Fontana & Henry Bromell; Teleplay by : David Simon	February 23, 1996	415	13.4
49	16	"Stakeout"	John McNaughton	Story by : Tom Fontana & Noel Behn; Teleplay by : Noel Behn	March 15, 1996	416	13.9
50	17	"Map of the Heart"	Clark Johnson	Story by : Michael Whaley & James Yoshimura; Teleplay by : Michael Whaley	April 26, 1996	417	10.2
51	18	"Requiem for Adena"	Lee Bonner	Julie Martin	March 29, 1996	418	11.8
52	19	"The Damage Done"	Jace Alexander	Story by : Henry Bromell & Tom Fontana; Teleplay by : Jorge Zamacona	May 3, 1996	419	11.2
53	20	"The Wedding"	Alan Taylor	Henry Bromell	May 10, 1996	420	11.5
54	21	"Scene of the Crime"	Kathy Bates	Teleplay by : Anya Epstein & David Simon; Story by : Henry Bromell & Barry Levinson and Tom Fontana	April 12, 1996	421	9.7
55	22	"Work Related"	Jean de Segonzac	Tom Fontana	May 17, 1996	422	13.0

=== Season 5 (1996–97) ===
No. overall	No. in season	Title	Directed by	Written by	Original release date	Prod. code	U.S. viewers (millions)
56	1	"Hostage, Part 1"	Ted Demme	Story by : Tom Fontana & Julie Martin; Teleplay by : James Yoshimura	September 20, 1996	501	12.3
57	2	"Hostage, Part 2"	Jean De Segonzac	Story by : Tom Fontana & James Yoshimura; Teleplay by : Julie Martin	September 27, 1996	502	11.7
58	3	"Prison Riot"	Kenneth Fink	Story by : Tom Fontana & Henry Bromell; Teleplay by : Tom Fontana	October 18, 1996	503	9.8
59	4	"Bad Medicine"	Kenneth Fink	Story by : Tom Fontana & Julie Martin; Teleplay by : David Simon	October 25, 1996	504	10.8
60	5	"M.E., Myself and I"	Michael Fields	Story by : Tom Fontana; Teleplay by : Lyle Weldon & Emily Whitesell	November 1, 1996	505	10.5
61	6	"White Lies"	Peter Weller	Story by : Tom Fontana & James Yoshimura; Teleplay by : Anya Epstein	November 8, 1996	506	11.2
62	7	"The Heart of a Saturday Night"	Whit Stillman	Henry Bromell	November 15, 1996	507	11.0
63	8	"The True Test"	Alan Taylor	Story by : Tom Fontana & Noel Behn; Teleplay by : Noel Behn	November 22, 1996	508	13.0
64	9	"Control"	Jean De Segonzac	Story by : Tom Fontana & Julie Martin; Teleplay by : Les Carter & Susan Sisko	December 6, 1996	509	12.1
65	10	"Blood Wedding"	Kevin Hooks	Story by : Tom Fontana & James Yoshimura; Teleplay by : Matt Witten	December 13, 1996	510	11.6
66	11	"The Documentary"	Barbara Kopple	Story by : Tom Fontana & James Yoshimura & Eric Overmyer; Teleplay by : Eric Overmyer	January 3, 1997	511	11.54
67	12	"Betrayal"	Clark Johnson	Story by : Tom Fontana & Julie Martin; Teleplay by : Gay Walch	January 10, 1997	512	13.67
68	13	"Have a Conscience"	Uli Edel	James Yoshimura	January 17, 1997	513	13.85
69	14	"Diener"	Kyle Secor	Story by : Tom Fontana & Julie Martin; Teleplay by : Christopher Kyle	January 31, 1997	514	11.45
70	15	"Wu's on First?"	Tim McCann	Story by : James Yoshimura & Julie Martin; Teleplay by : David Simon & Anya Epstein	February 7, 1997	515	11.57
71	16	"Valentine's Day"	Clark Johnson	Tom Fontana	February 14, 1997	516	10.05
72	17	"Kaddish"	Jean De Segonzac	Story by : Julie Martin & James Yoshimura & Ron Goldstein; Teleplay by : Linda McGibney	February 21, 1997	517	10.95
73	18	"Double Blind"	Uli Edel	Story by : Tom Fontana & James Yoshimura; Teleplay by : Lee Blessing & Jeanne Blake	April 11, 1997	518	11.49
74	19	"Deception"	Peter Medak	Story by : Tom Fontana & Julie Martin & James Yoshimura; Teleplay by : Debbie Sarjeant	April 25, 1997	519	9.91
75	20	"Narcissus"	Jean De Segonzac	Yaphet Kotto	May 2, 1997	520	10.47
76	21	"Partners and Other Strangers"	Leslie Libman & Larry Williams	Anya Epstein & Julie Martin & Darryl LeMont Wharton	May 9, 1997	521	10.85
77	22	"Strangers and Other Partners"	Kenneth Fink	David Simon & Tom Fontana & James Yoshimura	May 16, 1997	522	11.09

=== Season 6 (1997–98) ===
Note: "Baby It's You", the 6th episode of Law & Order's eighth season, is a cross-over episode that precedes the events of "Baby It's You", the 5th episode of Homicide Life on the Streets sixth season.

No. overall	No. in season	Title	Directed by	Written by	Original release date	Prod. code	U.S. viewers (millions)
78	1	"Blood Ties, Part 1"	Alan Taylor	Story by : Tom Fontana & Julie Martin; Teleplay by : Anya Epstein	October 17, 1997	601	11.44
79	2	"Blood Ties, Part 2"	Nick Gomez	Story by : Tom Fontana & James Yoshimura; Teleplay by : David Simon	October 24, 1997	602	9.71
80	3	"Blood Ties, Part 3"	Mark Pellington	Story by : Tom Fontana & Julie Martin & James Yoshimura; Teleplay by : David Simon & Anya Epstein	October 31, 1997	603	9.10
81	4	"Subway"	Gary Fleder	James Yoshimura	December 5, 1997	604	10.32
82	5	"Baby, It's You"	Ed Sherin	Jorge Zamacona	November 14, 1997	605	14.68
83	6	"Birthday"	Alison Maclean	Julie Martin	November 7, 1997	606	9.47
84	7	"Saigon Rose"	Nick Gomez	Eric Overmeyer	November 21, 1997	607	10.27
85	8	"All Is Bright"	Matt Reeves	Story by : Julie Martin & James Yoshimura; Teleplay by : Rafael Alvarez	December 12, 1997	608	10.77
86	9	"Closet Cases"	Leslie Libman & Larry Williams	Story by : James Yoshimura & Julie Martin; Teleplay by : Christopher Kyle	January 2, 1998	609	10.53
87	10	"Sins of the Father"	Mary Harron	Story by : James Yoshimura & Julie Martin; Teleplay by : Darryl LeMont Wharton	January 9, 1998	610	10.68
88	11	"Shaggy Dog, City Goat"	Kyle Secor	Eric Overmeyer	January 16, 1998	611	11.41
89	12	"Something Sacred"	Uli Edel	Anya Epstein	January 30, 1998	612	11.72
90	13	"Something Sacred"	Uli Edel	David Simon & Anya Epstein	January 30, 1998	613	11.72
91	14	"Lies and Other Truths"	Nick Gomez	Noel Behn	March 6, 1998	614	8.94
92	15	"Pit Bull Sessions"	Barbara Kopple	Story by : Julie Martin & James Yoshimura; Teleplay by : Sean Whitesell	March 13, 1998	615	10.80
93	16	"Mercy"	Alan Taylor	Eric Overmeyer	March 20, 1998	616	10.44
94	17	"Abduction"	Kenneth Fink	Julie Martin & Anya Epstein	March 27, 1998	617	10.73
95	18	"Full Court Press"	Clark Johnson	Story by : David Simon & Phillip B. Epstein; Teleplay by : Phillip B. Epstein	April 3, 1998	618	9.08
96	19	"Strangled, Not Stirred"	Jay Tobias	Story by : Julie Martin & Anya Epstein; Teleplay by : Linda McGibney	April 10, 1998	619	9.55
97	20	"Secrets"	Ed Bianchi	Yaphet Kotto	April 17, 1998	620	9.96
98	21	"Finnegan's Wake"	Steve Buscemi	Story by : David Simon & James Yoshimura; Teleplay by : David Mills	April 24, 1998	621	11.33
99	22	"Fallen Heroes, Part 1"	Kathryn Bigelow	Story by : Eric Overmyer; Teleplay by : Lois Johnson	May 1, 1998	622	9.89
100	23	"Fallen Heroes, Part 2"	Kathryn Bigelow	Story by : James Yoshimura; Teleplay by : Joy Lusco	May 8, 1998	623	12.24

=== Season 7 (1998–99) ===
Note: "Sideshow", the 15th episode of Law & Order's ninth season, is a cross-over episode that precedes the events of "Sideshow", the 15th episode of Homicide Life on the Streets seventh season.

No. overall	No. in season	Title	Directed by	Written by	Original release date	Prod. code	U.S. viewers (millions)
101	1	"La Famiglia"	Nick Gomez	Tom Fontana	September 25, 1998	701	9.81
102	2	"Brotherly Love"	Peter Medak	Julie Martin	October 16, 1998	702	8.99
103	3	"Just an Old Fashioned Love Song"	Leslie Libman and Larry Williams	Eric Overmyer	October 23, 1998	703	8.44
104	4	"The Twenty Percent Solution"	Clark Johnson	David Simon	October 30, 1998	704	8.00
105	5	"Red, Red Wine"	Edward Bianchi	Sara B. Charno	November 6, 1998	705	9.98
106	6	"Wanted Dead or Alive, Part 1"	Robert Harmon	James Yoshimura	November 13, 1998	706	10.25
107	7	"Wanted Dead or Alive, Part 2"	Robert Harmon	Anya Epstein	November 20, 1998	707	10.74
108	8	"Kellerman, P.I., Part 1"	Kenneth Fink	Story by : James Yoshimura & Julie Martin; Teleplay by : Joy Lusco	December 4, 1998	708	9.49
109	9	"Kellerman, P.I., Part 2"	Jay Tobias	Story by : Tom Fontana & Eric Overmyer; Teleplay by : Sean Whitesell	December 11, 1998	709	9.32
110	10	"Shades of Gray"	Adam Bernstein	Story by : David Simon & Julie Martin; Teleplay by : T. J. English	January 8, 1999	710	12.29
111	11	"Bones of Contention"	Brad Anderson	Story by : Eric Overmyer; Teleplay by : Jason Yoshimura	January 15, 1999	711	10.57
112	12	"The Same Coin"	Lisa Cholodenko	Story by : David Simon & James Yoshimura; Teleplay by : Sharon Guskin	January 29, 1999	712	10.67
113	13	"Homicide.com"	Jay Tobias	Story by : Ayelet Sela & Sara B. Charno; Teleplay by : Sara B. Charno	February 5, 1999	713	11.23
114	14	"A Case of Do or Die"	Tim Van Patten	Anya Epstein	February 12, 1999	714	10.72
115	15	"Sideshow"	Ed Sherin	David Simon	February 19, 1999	715	12.93
116	16	"Truth Will Out"	Keith Samples	Story by : Noel Behn & Anya Epstein; Teleplay by : Anya Epstein	March 26, 1999	716	9.83
117	17	"Zen and the Art of Murder"	Miguel Arteta	Story by : Tom Fontana & Julie Martin; Teleplay by : Lloyd Rose	April 2, 1999	717	11.03
118	18	"Self Defense"	Barbara Kopple	Story by : David Simon & Eric Overmyer; Teleplay by : Yaphet Kotto	April 9, 1999	718	10.16
120	19	"Lines of Fire"	Kathryn Bigelow	Story by : Tom Fontana & James Yoshimura; Teleplay by : James Yoshimura	May 7, 1999	719	10.25
121	20	"The Why Chromosome"	Kyle Secor	Anya Epstein	May 14, 1999	720	9.78
119	21	"Identity Crisis"	Joe Berlinger	Story by : Tom Fontana & Eric Overmyer; Teleplay by : Willie Reale	April 30, 1999	721	10.54
122	22	"Forgive Us Our Trespasses"	Alan Taylor	Tom Fontana	May 21, 1999	722	11.36

== Television film (2000) ==
Title	Directed by	Written by	Original release date	Viewers (millions)
Homicide: The Movie	Jean de Segonzac	Eric Overmyer, James Yoshimura & Tom Fontana	February 13, 2000	14.23
Al Giardello, shift commander of the homicide unit, retires from the department to run for Mayor of Baltimore. When he is shot and wounded during a campaign rally, all of the living current/former detectives who served under him work together to find his assailant.

== Home media releases ==
Season	No. of discs	Release date	Bonus features
1	4	May 27, 2003	Commentary with Barry Levinson and Tom Fontana on the pilot episode "Gone for Goode"; "Homicide: Life at the Start" - An Interview with Barry Levinson and Tom Fontana; "To Catch a Killer: Homicide Detectives" Episode of A&E's Signature Series American Justice; Super Bowl XXVII Commercials for Season 1 Premiere; Homicide: Life on the Street Song Listing; Cast and Crew Biographies; Interactive Menus; Scene Selection
2	4	May 27, 2003	Commentary with Barry Levinson and Tom Fontana on the pilot episode "Gone for Goode"; "Homicide: Life at the Start" - An Interview with Barry Levinson and Tom Fontana; "To Catch a Killer: Homicide Detectives" Episode of A&E's Signature Series American Justice; Super Bowl XXVII Commercials for Season 1 Premiere; Homicide: Life on the Street Song Listing; Cast and Crew Biographies; Interactive Menus; Scene Selection
3	6	October 28, 2003	Homicide: Life in Season 3 - An Interview with Barry Levinson, Tom Fontana, Henry Bromell, David Simon, and James Yoshimura, Narrated by Daniel Baldwin; Commentary with Barry Levinson and Henry Bromell on "Gas Man"; About "The Board"; Song Listing; Cast and Crew Biographies; Interactive Menus; Scene Selection
4	6	March 30, 2004	Homicide: Life in Season 4: An Interview with Barry Levinson, Tom Fontana, Henry Bromell, David Simon, and James Yoshimura, Narrated by Isabella Hoffmann; Commentary with Clark Johnson and Writer Anya Epstein on "The Hat"; Song Listing; Cast and Crew Biographies; Interactive Menus; Scene Selection
5	6	September 28, 2004	Commentary on "The Documentary" with Writers Eric Overmeyer and James Yoshimura; Inside Homicide: An Interview with David Simon and James Yoshimura; Cast and Crew Biographies; Interactive Menus; Scene Selection
6	6	January 25, 2005	Feature-Length Documentary Anatomy of a Homicide; Commentary with Writer James Yoshimura and Director Gary Fleder on "The Subway"; Cast and Crew Biographies; Interactive Menus; Scene Selection
7	6	June 28, 2005	Commentary with Tom Fontana, James Yoshimura, and Julie Martin on the episode "Forgive Our Trespasses"; Live Panel Discussion with Tom Fontana, Barry Levinson, James Yoshimura, and David Simon; Barry Levinson's Acceptance Speech for the 2004 Video Software Dealers Association Center Achievement Award; Cast and Crew Biographies; Interactive Menus; Scene Selection
The Complete Series	35	October 20, 2009	The 3 Law & Order Crossover Episodes "Charm City", "Baby It's You, Part 1" and "Sideshow, Part 1"; Homicide: The Movie
