= Homicide: Life on the Street season 4 =

Homicide: Life on the Street
- Season 4
- Season 4 U.S. DVD cover
- Starring: Richard Belzer; Andre Braugher; Reed Diamond; Isabella Hofmann; Clark Johnson; Yaphet Kotto; Melissa Leo; Kyle Secor
- No. of episodes: 22

Release
- Original network: NBC
- Original release: October 20, 1995 – May 17, 1996

Season chronology
- ← Previous; Season 3 Next → Season 5

The fourth season of Homicide: Life on the Street aired in the United States on the NBC television network from October 20, 1995 to May 17, 1996 and contained 22 episodes.

The fourth season marked the debut of two characters: Detective Mike Kellerman (portrayed by Reed Diamond), who transfers from Arson to Homicide; and J. H. Brodie (portrayed by Max Perlich), a news cameraman who is hired as the unit's videographer. The season was also the last to feature Captain/Detective Megan Russert (portrayed by Isabella Hofmann) as a regular. Drug kingpin Luther Mahoney (portrayed by Erik Dellums) and Stuart Gharty (portrayed by Peter Gerety) debut with guest appearances.

Guest stars include Lily Tomlin, Jeffrey Donovan, Bruce Campbell, Jerry Orbach, Benjamin Bratt, Jill Hennessy, Chris Rock, Marcia Gay Harden and Jay Leno.

The DVD box set of season 4 was released for Region 1 on March 30, 2004. The set includes all 22 season 4 episodes on six discs.

== Episodes ==
When first shown on network television, multiple episodes ("Full Moon", "For God and Country", "Thrill of the Kill", "Hate Crimes", "A Doll's Eyes", and "Heartbeat") were aired out of the order in which they were actually produced. The DVD of this season presents the episodes in their correct chronological order, restoring all storylines and character developments.

No. overall	No. in season	Title	Directed by	Written by	Original release date	Prod. code	U.S. viewers (millions)
34	1	"Fire, Part 1"	Tim Hunter	Story by : Tom Fontana & Henry Bromell; Teleplay by : Julie Martin	October 20, 1995	401	13.0
With Bolander and Felton suspended, the squad struggles to pick up the slack. Pembleton and Bayliss investigate a body found at a burned-out warehouse and cross paths with arson detective Mike Kellerman, whose theories of the crime put him at odds with the pair. He believes it to be an insurance fraud ploy, while Pembleton and Bayliss suspect it to be a murder. Soon a second building is set on fire, with another body found in the rubble. Munch and Howard both sign up for promotion exams. First appearance of Det. Mike Kellerman
35	2	"Fire, Part 2"	Nick Gomez	Story by : Henry Bromell & Tom Fontana; Teleplay by : Jack Behr	October 27, 1995	402	14.1
The arson/murder investigation continues, and Kellerman surprises everyone with his successful interrogation of the prime suspect. Giardello offers him a chance to join the homicide unit. Kellerman accepts after visiting his father at the distillery where he works. Howard takes the promotion exam, but Munch is a no-show.
36	3	"Autofocus"	Alan Taylor	Story by : Tom Fontana & Henry Bromell; Teleplay by : Bonnie Mark	November 3, 1995	403	12.9
The department moves into an old bank building when a gas leak forces them to evacuate headquarters. Detectives Lewis and Kellerman partner up to investigate the murder of an old woman; a young news cameraman named J. H. Brodie risks his job to help them solve it. Pembleton is thrown off balance by the change of scenery and the fact that he will soon become a father, while Howard (recently promoted to Sergeant) gets off to a bad start in her attempts to supervise the other detectives, Lewis in particular. First appearance of J. H. Brodie
37	4	"A Doll's Eyes"	Kenneth Fink	Story by : Tom Fontana & Henry Bromell; Teleplay by : James Yoshimura	December 1, 1995	404	13.9
A shooting at a mall leaves a 10-year-old boy brain-dead. As his parents struggle with decisions about keeping him on life support or donating his organs, Pembleton and Bayliss investigate the case and wind up questioning their own moral and spiritual convictions. The parents ultimately decide to donate their son's organs, asking to spend his last moments with him. The boy was accidentally shot during a dispute between two brothers over a girl and the detectives manage to apprehend the killer. A man whose son was a recipient of the victim's kidney speaks to Bayliss about wishing to express his gratitude to the family and his complex feelings on the matter. The Pope visits Baltimore, an event that Russert has an expensive ticket to and that Pembleton watches pensively on TV. Guest star: Marcia Gay Harden
38	5	"Heartbeat"	Bruno Kirby	Story by : Henry Bromell and Tom Fontana; Teleplay by : Kevin Arkadie	December 8, 1995	405	12.8
The department returns to their headquarters. As Lewis and Kellerman quickly solve a drug-related death, they get a tip on another case: a man who was immured behind a brick wall 10 years before. Munch and Howard suspect a drug dealer obsessed with Edgar Allan Poe, relying on psychological manipulation to get him to confess. Despite failing to obtain a confession, the man is still tortured by guilt, ultimately cementing himself behind the same wall as his victim. Munch's stab at a relationship with medical examiner Alyssa Dyer quickly goes sour when he cheats on her with her roommate. Pembleton finds that everyone in the office suddenly knows about Mary's pregnancy, becoming enraged at Bayliss for revealing his secret. Guest star: Kevin Conway as Joseph Cardero
39	6	"Hate Crimes"	Peter Weller	James Yoshimura and Tom Fontana	November 17, 1995	406	12.7
After a man is killed by skinheads outside a gay bar, Pembleton and Bayliss find their investigation into the hate crime complicated by conflicting information about his sexual preferences. They identify the two suspects, but find it hard to locate them due to neonazi groups collaborating and harboring members across the country. After speaking to the victim's fiancé, the detectives conclude that he likely wasn't gay, but was killed because he was perceived sexual identity. Lewis and Kellerman catch a new lead on Crosetti's last unsolved case, putting Lewis (who originally worked it with Crosetti) and Howard (who took over after Crosetti's death) sharply at odds with each other. Despite Howard's order that she be present for the interrogation, Lewis and Kellerman interview the suspect by themselves and get a confession, leading to more tension between Howard and Lewis. The upcoming Thanksgiving holiday has all the detectives making and rearranging plans on the fly; Lewis finds a date and Howard invites Kellerman to join her family, an offer he ultimately declines, deciding to spend the day alone. Brodie is officially hired as videographer for the homicide unit. Guest stars: Terry O'Quinn as Bailey Lafeld; Allison Smith as Officer Debbie Haskell; Dean Winters as Tom Marans
40	7	"Thrill of the Kill"	Tim Hunter	Story by : Tom Fontana & Henry Bromell; Teleplay by : Jorge Zamacona	November 10, 1995	407	13.0
The homicide unit works with the FBI to catch a thrill-killer who is working his way north along Interstate 95. Pembleton and Bayliss conclude that the murders occur every time the suspect stops for gasoline. Russert authorizes a roadblock, but the killer leaves the car and escapes on foot. Eventually, he's surrounded at a gas station after hiding in the back of a woman's car. In the Box, he insists that he isn't the killer despite video and forensic evidence. Bayliss receives a call from a mysterious man who claims to be the killer instead. Arriving at another gas station, the detectives find the suspect's identical twin brother awaiting calmly after shooting another person. Giardello worries when his daughter Charisse doesn't show up for lunch. She arrives late and surprises him by announcing her engagement and plans to move across the country. Guest star: Jeffrey Donovan as Newton and Miles Dell
41	8	"Sniper: Part 1"	Jean de Segonzac	Story by : Henry Bromell & Tom Fontana; Teleplay by : Jean Gennis & Phyliss Murphy	January 5, 1996	408	13.4
The start of 1996 brings a clean board that is soon covered with red names when a series of sniper attacks leaves nine people dead and puts the entire department on red-ball alert. A game of hangman is found drawn in chalk at every scene. A handwriting expert identifies the suspect, leading the detectives to his house where Bayliss attempts to reason with him. Finishing his game of hangman, the suspect kills himself even while his house is surrounded and filled with policemen. Dissatisfied with Russert's handling of the case, Colonel Barnfather demotes her from Captain to Detective and sends her home; she is barely through the door before another sniper attack claims three more lives. During the course of the investigation, Bayliss takes a few too many muscle relaxants for his chronic back pain and ponders having surgery. Jay Leno visits the Waterfront only to be driven away by the reticence of Bayliss and Munch.
42	9	"Sniper: Part 2"	Darnell Martin	Story by : Henry Bromell & Tom Fontana; Teleplay by : Edward Gold	January 12, 1996	409	14.1
As the sniper attacks resume, the exhausted detectives return to work – including Russert, whom Giardello calls in despite Barnfather's order that she stay out of the case. Pembleton believes that the new shooter (who eventually racks up five kills) is connected to the first, while Russert believes him to be a copycat killer. After an overly helpful witness attracts the detectives' attention, Russert draws on recent experience to extract a confession from him. At a coffeeshop, Bayliss expresses his belief that Russert was demoted because she was trying to help the detectives on the ground over their self-serving higher-ups.
43	10	"Full Moon"	Leslie Libman & Larry Williams	Story by : Tom Fontana & Henry Bromell & Eric Overmeyer; Teleplay by : Eric Overmeyer	April 5, 1996	410	11.4
Lewis and Kellerman investigate a shooting death at the seedy New Moon Motel on the outskirts of Baltimore. The fact that nearly every tenant has a criminal record, and the victim is missing both a boot and vintage motorcycle, leave the pair awash in potential suspects but short on evidence. Kellerman has a deep conversation with a prostitute that reminds him of an old flame. The detectives arrest a suspicious couple and solve a different murder after interviewing the motel owner, but the New Moon Motel death remains unsolved. Lewis watches the demolition of the housing project in which he grew up, and takes one of its bricks as a memento. Cameo by The Reverend Horton Heat
44	11	"For God and Country"	Ed Sherin	Jorge Zamacona & Michael S. Chernuchin	February 9, 1996	411	16.7
As detectives from Baltimore and New York City connect a pair of poison gas attacks in the two cities five years apart, the prime suspect's wife is murdered to keep him from giving up any more information. His son tips off the police, leading to the arrest of an anarchist ex-Special Forces colonel who is trying to start a race war. The suspect is extradited to New York despite the Baltimore detectives' protests. While handing off the suspect at the train station, the colonel passes away from a heart condition after not taking his medication. Pembleton is devastated that he won't be convicted for the church attacks that greatly affected the Black community in Baltimore. This episode concludes a crossover with Law & Order that begins on "Charm City." Guest star: J. K. Simmons as Alexander Rausch Special appearances by Benjamin Bratt as NYPD Det. Rey Curtis; Jill Hennessy as New York A.D.A. Claire Kincaid; Jerry Orbach as NYPD Det. Lennie Briscoe
45	12	"The Hat"	Peter Medak	Story by : Henry Bromell & Trish Soodik and Tom Fontana; Teleplay by : Anya Epstein	January 19, 1996	412	13.8
Lewis and Kellerman are sent to Pennsylvania to pick up Rose Halligan, a fugitive wanted in Baltimore for the murder of her husband. The trip turns into a disaster after she escapes their custody and is later found outside the home of her husband's mistress, whom she has just killed. A case investigated by Munch falls apart in court when Brodie's videotape shows a key piece of evidence missing from the crime scene. Anticipation in the squadroom comes to a head with the announcement that the open captain's position has been filled – and to everyone's shock, it goes to Roger Gaffney instead of Giardello. Guest star: Lily Tomlin as Rose Halligan
46	13	"I've Got a Secret"	Gwen Arner	Story by : Tom Fontana & Henry Bromell; Teleplay by : D. Maria Legaspi	February 2, 1996	413	14.5
Investigating the case of a man found dead in the driver's seat of a borrowed car, Pembleton and Bayliss question whether an emergency room doctor's bias against criminals led her to perform shoddy surgery that caused his death. Lewis and Kellerman make several attempts to apprehend a suspect wanted for the murder of his parents, but he fights them off. After they finally catch him and he's determined to be schizophrenic, Lewis reveals that he has a mentally ill brother who has been institutionalized for nearly 20 years. Lewis attempts to visit his brother, but he refuses to see him. Munch spots Howard with a mysterious new man and relentlessly hounds her about his identity. Ultimately, he accepts Howard's decision to keep her private life private at work.
47	14	"Justice: Part 1"	Michael Radford	Story by : Tom Fontana & Henry Bromell; Teleplay by : David Rupel	February 16, 1996	414	13.3
Munch and Russert take the case of a retired cop, Edgar Rodzinski, found strangled at his wife's grave. His son Jake is a BCPD detective who knew Lewis from the police academy, and he starts pressing Lewis to give him information and get involved so he can do a little digging of his own. However, his efforts only hinder the other detectives' work. A suspect is arrested and brought to trial; after he is inexplicably acquitted, Jake stays behind at the courthouse to threaten him. Guest star: Bruce Campbell as Jake Rodzinski
48	15	"Justice: Part 2"	Peter Medak	Story by : Tom Fontana & Henry Bromell; Teleplay by : David Simon	February 23, 1996	415	13.4
As Jake Rodzinski struggles to cope with the acquittal of his father's killer, a new case comes in: that same killer has been found shot in the head. Kellerman picks up the case and is ordered not to share information with Lewis because of the past relationship between Lewis and Jake. Lewis explores a drug-related angle that only leads to dead ends. As the evidence increasingly points to Jake's involvement in the shooting, Gee reflects on the changed culture of the police; in the old days, cop killers were shot on sight. Jake's partner eventually gives him up and, unlike his father's killer, Jake is convicted by the jury. Meanwhile, Bayliss nurses a grudge against Pembleton for forgetting his lunch order of a grilled cheese sandwich. After several passive-aggressive incidents, Pembleton apologizes by filling Bayliss' desk with grilled cheese sandwiches. Guest star: Bruce Campbell as Jake Rodzinski
49	16	"Stakeout"	John McNaughton	Story by : Tom Fontana & Noel Behn; Teleplay by : Noel Behn	March 15, 1996	416	13.9
After the detectives learn the name of the man responsible for a long string of abductions and murders, they begin round-the-clock surveillance at his neighbors' house, waiting for him to come home so they can arrest him. As everyone on the shift takes a turn, three topics keep coming up: the personal lives of the homeowners, Giardello's indecision about flying to California for his daughter's wedding, and rumors that Bayliss plans to leave the homicide unit or quit altogether. Pembleton manages to convince Giardello to attend the wedding, but his plane gets delayed. Pembleton and Bayliss arrest the suspect, as Bayliss ponders taking a security guard job in Los Angeles. Guest stars: Jim True-Frost as George Buxton, Kate Walsh as Cathy Buxton
50	17	"Map of the Heart"	Clark Johnson	Story by : Michael Whaley & James Yoshimura; Teleplay by : Michael Whaley	April 26, 1996	417	10.2
A high-profile divorce lawyer is found dead in his own swimming pool, and a man named Richard Laumer claiming to be his son shows up in the homicide office with evidence to incriminate himself. The man that raised him left a trust fund that would only become Laumer's if his biological father died. Pembleton and Bayliss find themselves in a face-off with the National Security Agency that Laumer works for. Following the agency's involvement, a second suspect makes a sudden confession that seems a little too convenient. The detectives attempt to elicit a confession from Laumer at the Waterfront bar, to no avail. Meanwhile, Brodie tries to toughen himself up by training with Kellerman, Munch buys a VCR of highly questionable origin, and Kellerman tries to unmask the "Lunch Bandit" who has been stealing everyone's food from the office refrigerator. Guest star: Terry Kinney as Richard Laumer
51	18	"Requiem for Adena"	Lee Bonner	Julie Martin	March 29, 1996	418	11.8
A young girl is found murdered in a manner very similar to Adena Watson. Remembering how that investigation spiraled out of control, Pembleton insists on working the current case alone and without the usual "red ball" treatment. Bayliss’ conviction that the two cases are connected leads him into a clash with Pembleton and jeopardizes the latter’s efforts to get a confession from a suspect. Ultimately, Pembleton extracts a confession and Bayliss, after speaking with Giardello, begins letting go off his first case. Brodie reveals his secret crush on Howard, who thinks he and the rest of the squad are playing a joke on her. Guest star: Chris Rock as Carver Dooley
52	19	"The Damage Done"	Jace Alexander	Story by : Henry Bromell & Tom Fontana; Teleplay by : Jorge Zamacona	May 3, 1996	419	11.2
Kellerman becomes the primary on a rash of drug-related killings that prove to be part of a turf war between two rival dealers, "Drak" Fortunato and Luther Mahoney. Each points the finger at the other until a standoff with Drak and a surprise confession of the hired killer convince Kellerman that Mahoney is responsible for the murders. Kellerman almost shoots Drak at his apartment, instead walking away humbled with a battle wound. He also becomes close to the godmother of a little girl that was made an orphan in the conflict, but their connection seemingly goes nowhere. At a peace vigil attended by the detectives, Drak, and Mahoney, the turf war comes to a sudden end when Drak is shot dead. First appearance of Erik Dellums as Luther Mahoney
53	20	"The Wedding"	Alan Taylor	Henry Bromell	May 10, 1996	420	11.5
Lewis surprises the squad by announcing that he will be getting married at the end of the day's shift, and asks for their help in organizing the reception. Everyone is skeptical, especially Munch, but the wedding turns out to be genuine - and Pembleton's wife Mary goes into labor afterward. Howard's fun-loving sister Carrie comes in from Florence for a visit, prompting Bayliss and Kellerman to vie for her attention. With most of the squad otherwise occupied, Giardello and Howard team up to investigate the death of a controversial talk-radio DJ. After a potential suspect shoots at them and Giardello kills him in self-defense, they learn that a friend of his tipped them off as a practical joke. Giardello wrestles with feelings of inadequacy after having shot someone for the first time in 20 years, feeling like it could have been avoided, as well as bemoaning the fact that the case remains open. Melissa Leo, credited as "Margaret May", appears as Carrie Howard.
54	21	"Scene of the Crime"	Kathy Bates	Teleplay by : Anya Epstein & David Simon; Story by : Henry Bromell & Barry Levinson and Tom Fontana	April 12, 1996	421	9.7
Lewis and Kellerman investigate the death of a drug dealer in a housing project, but are hampered by the interference of a private security force run by Black Muslims. The case puts the two detectives at odds with each other and pits Giardello against Barnfather, who insists that nationwide politics trump the search for the killer. Giardello goes behind the bosses' back to the press, leading to the leader of the security force revealing the identity of the killer. A double shooting in another housing project leads Russert to file departmental charges against the patrolman, Stuart Gharty, who responded to the call, arguing that at least one of the victims might have survived if he had not waited to go in, fearing for his life. Gharty is reinstated despite the evidence presented. Meanwhile, Munch makes big plans for Bolander's return to work after his suspension, organizing everything at the Waterfront bar, only to have those plans ruined when Bolander backs out. First appearance of Patrolman (later Detective) Stuart Gharty
55	22	"Work Related"	Jean de Segonzac	Tom Fontana	May 17, 1996	422	13.0
Mary has given birth to the Pembletons' daughter Olivia and Bayliss demands to visit their home for the first time and see her. Lewis confesses to Kellerman that his marriage is already in trouble. The pair investigate a literal "red ball" case — a man killed by a red bowling ball thrown from a freeway overpass — as Giardello frets over the bosses' upcoming review of his earlier self-defense shooting. Pembleton and Bayliss take a robbery/murder at a fast food restaurant; once they get an accomplice of the shooter in the Box, Pembleton suffers a stroke. He is rushed to the hospital for emergency brain surgery, with uncertain prospects for his recovery. After exploring all options, Lewis accepts that his case is almost unsolvable and leaves to work on his marriage. Russert and Munch take over Pembleton's investigation and discover that the killer had hanged himself. Final appearance of Det. Megan Russert as a regular character

== Cast ==
Returning for the fourth season of Homicide were Richard Belzer, Andre Braugher, Isabella Hofmann, Clark Johnson, Yaphet Kotto, Melissa Leo, and Kyle Secor. Daniel Baldwin and Ned Beatty did not return, as both were frustrated with the direction of the show. The characters of Beau Felton (Baldwin) and Stanley Bolander (Beatty) were written out by engaging in drunken, inappropriate behavior while attending a policeman/firefighters convention in New York City; as a result both were suspended for 22 weeks (the length of the season). While they were only suspended for the duration of season 4, their departure from the series was not revealed until the next season.

Both Reed Diamond and Max Perlich joined the cast as Detective Mike Kellerman and J.H. Brodie, respectively. During the season, Diamond was credited as a main cast member while Perlich was a recurring cast member. The character of J.H. Brodie was supposedly based on David Simon. Season 4 also saw the debut of Peter Gerety as Stuart Gharty. The Gharty character would make a guest appearance once during the season as well as two guest appearances during the fifth season before becoming a main character in the final two seasons. The fourth season also saw the debut of Erik Dellums as drug kingpin Luther Mahoney. Despite only making one appearance during the season, the character would return many times during the fifth season serving as the main antagonist for the detectives.

Isabella Hofmann left the cast at the end of the season due to pregnancy with her and Daniel Baldwin's child, but would return for three guest appearances (two in person, one as a telephone voice) in the fifth season. Andre Braugher nearly left after the season, believing he had explored the Frank Pembleton character to its limit, but he decided to return after the producers agreed to give Pembleton a handicap by means of a stroke, portrayed at the end of season 4.

Celebrity guest appearances include Lily Tomlin as murder suspect Rose Halligan in "The Hat", Jeffrey Donovan played twins Newton and Miles Dell with one being a thrill-killer in "Thrill of the Kill", Bruce Campbell played grief-stricken detective Jake Rodzinski in the two part "Justice", Law & Order stars Jerry Orbach, Benjamin Bratt, and Jill Hennessey played their characters Lennie Briscoe, Rey Curtis, and Claire Kincaid respectively in "For God and Country", and Jay Leno played himself in a cameo appearance in "Sniper Part 1".

== Reception ==
=== Ratings ===
Ratings for season 4 improved compared to season 3. Homicide ranked #66 and had an estimated audience of 8,900,000 a step up compared to Season 3 which ranked at #89 and had an estimated audience of 8,200,000.

=== Awards ===
Homicide would win two TCA Awards for "Outstanding Achievements In Drama" and "Program of the Year" as well as one Viewers for Quality Television award for "Best Quality Drama Series". Homicide was nominated for three Emmy Awards as Andre Braugher was nominated for Lead Actor in a Drama Series, Lily Tomlin was nominated for Guest Actress in a Drama Series for her guest appearance in the episode: "The Hat", and the show was nominated for Casting for a Drama Series. The show was also nominated for one Humanitas Prize for "60 Minute Category" as well as 3 NAACP Image Awards including "Outstanding Drama Series" while Braugher and Yaphet Kotto were both nominated for "Outstanding Lead Actor in a Drama Series".
