= Stephanie Romanov =

American model and actress (born 1969)

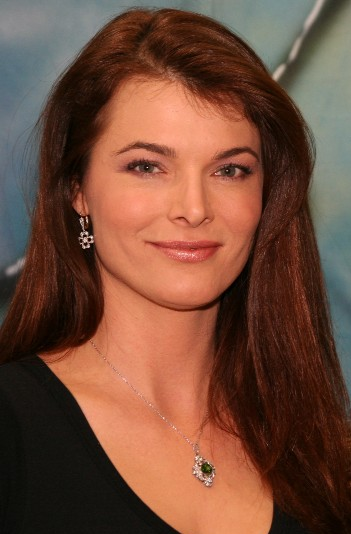
- Romanov in March 2006
- Born: Stephanie A. Romanov; January 24, 1969 (age 57); Las Vegas, Nevada, U.S.
- Occupations: Model, actress
- Years active: 1984–1993 (model); 1994–2012 (actress)
- Spouse: Nick Wechsler (m. 2001)
- Children: 1

Stephanie A. Romanov (born January 23, 1969) is an American former model and actress, best known for playing Lilah Morgan on Angel.

== Life and career ==
Romanov was born in Las Vegas, Nevada. She first began modeling in Europe and was discovered at 15 by Elite Model Management founder, John Casablancas. Her first professional modeling job was in Europe, shooting fashion layouts for Italian and French Bazaar. She then moved to New York to pursue a professional model career, leaving her family in Las Vegas. She appeared in ELLE, Vanity Fair and French Vogue.

In 1993, Romanov decided to leave modeling in favor of acting. She landed her first role as Teri Spencer on Aaron Spelling's Models, Inc.. She went on to land guest starring roles in Homicide: Life on the Street, The Sentinel, Just Shoot Me! and Burke's Law. She starred on Angel for four seasons, playing Lilah Morgan from 2000 to 2003.

Romanov has also appeared in several films, including Spy Hard and Menno's Mind. She played Jacqueline Kennedy in the critically acclaimed Thirteen Days and appeared in The Final Cut alongside Robin Williams. Her final role was in the 2012 film Slumber Party Slaughter.

She is of Slovakian descent. In December 2001, she married film producer Nick Wechsler in Cambodia; they have one child together, Lily Andreja Romanov-Wechsler.

== Filmography ==
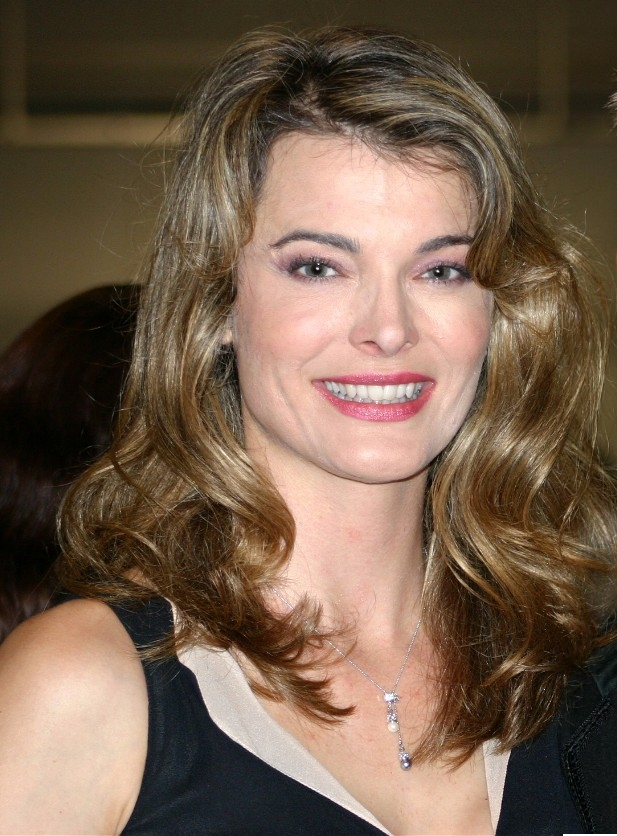
Romanov in June 2004

- Slumber Party Slaughter (2012 film) - as Victoria Spencer
- Last Night (2010) - as Sandra
- The Final Cut (2004) - as Jennifer Bannister
- Tricks (2004) - as Candy
- It Is What It Is (2001)
- Thirteen Days (2000) - as Jacqueline Kennedy
- Sunset Strip (2000) - as Christine
- Angel (2000–2003) (recurring) as Lilah Morgan
- Dark Spiral (1999) as Soupie
- Seven Days (TV series) Episodes: "Sister's Keeper" (1999) and "Kansas" (2001) - as Svetlana Vukovitch
- Alexandria Hotel (1998)
- Due South Episode: "Odds" (1998) - as Denny "Lady Shoes" Scarpa
- Cadillac (1997) as Kathy
- Early Edition (TV series) Episode: "Redfellas" (1997) - as Paulina Rosanova
- Just Shoot Me! Episode: "La Cage" (1997) - as Nikki Ellston
- The Sentinel Episode: "The Inside Man" (1997) - as Michelle Lazar
- Menno's Mind (1996) - as Loria
- Spy Hard (1996) as Victoria/Barbara Dahl
- Homicide: Life on the Street (TV series) Episode: "Fire (Part 1)", and "Fire (Part 2)" (1995) - as Anne Kennedy
- Burke's Law (TV series) Episode: "Who Killed the Tennis Ace?" (1995) - as Liza Dean
- Models Inc. (TV series) (1994–1995) - as Teri Spencer, and Monique Duran
- Melrose Place (TV series) (1994) - as Teri Spencer (two episodes)
