= Herb Levinson =

American actor (1929-2012)

Herbert S. Levinson (October 10, 1929 – November 19, 2012) was an American television and movie actor. Levinson played a variety of character roles, often set in Baltimore, Maryland. Most notably, he played the character Dr. Lausanne in the NBC police procedural series Homicide: Life on the Street.

== Biography ==
=== Personal life ===
Levinson was born October 10, 1929, in Baltimore, Maryland. He was the uncle of film director Barry Levinson. Levinson lived in Bethesda, Maryland, and was a member of Congregation Beth El there.

=== Career ===
Levinson played character roles in three Barry Levinson films. In the 1982 film Diner, Herb Levinson played an Emerson black and white television customer. In the 1987 comedy film Tin Men, Levinson played a metal siding customer. And in the 1990 film Avalon, Levinson played the Rabbi at the Funeral.

From 1994 to 1999, Levinson appeared in 15 episodes of Homicide: Life on the Street as Dr. Lausanne. And then in 2000, he again played Dr. Lausanne in the television movie Homicide: The Movie.
