= The Gas Man =

- Homicide: Life on the Street episode
- Episode no.: Season 3 Episode 20
- Directed by: Barry Levinson
- Story by: Tom Fontana; Henry Bromell
- Teleplay by: Henry Bromell
- Cinematography by: Jean de Segonzac
- Production code: 320
- Original air date: May 5, 1995

Guest appearances
- Bruno Kirby as Victor Helms; Richard Edson as Danny Newton; Ami Brabson as Mary Pembleton; Ralph Tabakin as Dr. Scheiner; Sharon Ziman as Naomi

Episode chronology
← Previous "Colors"	Next → "Fire (Part 1)"
- Homicide: Life on the Street season 3

"The Gas Man" is the season finale of the third season of the American police drama television series Homicide: Life on the Street. It originally aired on NBC on May 5, 1995. The episode was written by Henry Bromell and directed by Barry Levinson. The episode focuses on characters played by guest stars Bruno Kirby and Richard Edson, with the detectives who normally serve as the protagonists here serving the function as secondary characters.

== Plot summary ==
Victor Helms has served a six-year sentence for negligent homicide. Helms had incorrectly installed a gas heater in a house, resulting in a leak that killed the entire family living there. Pembleton was the primary investigator and key prosecution witness for the case against Helms, so when he is released from prison, he immediately seeks revenge against the detective.

Helms stalks Pembleton — spying on him with binoculars, breaking into his house to turn the stove on and even engaging in polite conversation with Pembleton's wife Mary in a grocery store — yet remains unsure of how to enact his scheme. Frank and Mary, meanwhile, remain oblivious to Helms's presence. Helms initially thinks he's found an angle for revenge when he discovers that Pembleton has been going to a fertility clinic in an attempt to get Mary pregnant, but he changes his mind when he and his friend Danny stumble upon a crime scene shortly before Pembleton arrives.

Helms and Danny are initially horrified to discover that a fortune teller's head has been severed, but Victor steals the head and the murder weapon, a large knife, to complicate Pembleton's investigation. Helms explains to Danny that his plan is to repeatedly tamper with the evidence at the crime scene in hopes that the investigation will eventually become hopelessly confused and publicly humiliate Pembleton. His plan starts to work, but Danny—who has come to respect Pembleton after observing the way he lives his life—walks away from Helms's plan, pointing out that unlike Helms the detective takes responsibility for his own life and actions.

Losing patience, Helms lures Pembleton into an abandoned building by calling in an anonymous tip on where Pembleton can retrieve the knife and the head. He takes Pembleton by surprise, putting the knife to his throat, but cannot bring himself to kill the detective. He breaks down in tears and is taken into custody.

== Production ==
According to the DVD commentary by director/producer Barry Levinson, NBC was on the fence about whether to renew Homicide for a fourth season; the show was earning critical acclaim, but struggling in the ratings. Levinson claims that the network led him to believe that the show would be cancelled, and yet failed to give him a definitive answer. Levinson's decision to give the show's acclaimed regular characters minimal screen time was an act of defiance aimed at the network.

== Cultural references ==
Danny listens to a constant stream of disco songs from the 1970s; the list of songs is provided on the DVD release of the episode.
