= Homicide: Second Shift =

Internet web series

Homicide: Second Shift was an Internet web series presented in a static script/comic book format (there was no streaming video) that tied into the TV series Homicide: Life on the Street. The web-show started 21 February 1997. The show featured detectives of the homicide squad that worked the second shift, after the television detectives went home for the day. Several of the characters from Homicide: Second Shift had cameos on Homicide: Life on the Street, and the show had one story crossover with the television show.

The on-air/online crossover—the first such crossover for NBC—was a three-part story-line. "Homicide.com", a season 7 episode Homicide: Life on the Street, was the middle part of the crossover with Homicide: Second Shift. Though the television episode was self-contained, parts one and three which were online only provided expanded context for the story.

== Cast ==
Character	Portrayed by	Character Role
Walter F. Neal	Joe Grifasi	Lieutenant
Raymonda "Ray" Cutler	Allison Janney	Detective
Layton "Lee" Johnson	Ray Anthony Thomas	Detective
Tony Bonaventura	Michael Ornstein	Detective
Joe Landau	Josh Pais	Detective
L. Z. Austin	Murphy Guyer	Detective
