= Fire (Part 1) =

- Homicide: Life on the Street episode
- Episode no.: Season 4 Episode 1
- Directed by: Tim Hunter
- Story by: Tom Fontana; Henry Bromell
- Teleplay by: Julie Martin
- Cinematography by: Jean de Segonzac
- Production code: 401
- Original air date: October 20, 1995

Guest appearances
- Stephanie Romanov as Anne Kennedy; Clayton LeBoeuf as Col. George Barnfather; Frank John Hughes as Zithead Mazursky; Walt McPherson as Det. Roger Gaffney; Margaret Trigg as Verónica Vélez; Ralph Tabakin as Dr. Scheiner; Sharon Ziman as Naomi

Episode chronology
← Previous "The Gas Man"	Next → "Fire (Part 2)"
- Homicide: Life on the Street season 4

"Fire" (Part 1) is the season premiere of the fourth season of the American police drama television series Homicide: Life on the Street. It originally aired on NBC on October 20, 1995. The episode was written by Julie Martin (from a story by Tom Fontana and Henry Bromell) and was directed by Tim Hunter. The two-part story centres on Pembleton and Bayliss' investigation into a pair of arson-related homicides, and introduces a new regular character, Arson Squad detective Mike Kellerman (played by Reed Diamond), who subsequently transfers to Homicide and partners with Det. Meldrick Lewis. This episode also flagged the permanent departure of regular characters Stanley Bolander (Ned Beatty) and Beau Felton (Daniel Baldwin).

== Plot summary ==
Baltimore Police detectives Kay Howard and John Munch are on the roof of the police station, discussing a recent fiasco at a police convention in New York City, in which 100 drunken police–including Stanley Bolander and Beau Felton–ran amok at their hotel, resulting in both Bolander and Felton being given a 22-week suspension. As they talk, Howard notices a fire in the distance. At the scene of the fire, firefighters discover a charred body and summon the homicide unit.

Frank Pembleton and Tim Bayliss arrive to investigate and meet arson investigator Mike Kellerman. He and Pembleton clash over Kellerman's assumptions about the victim's identity and manner of death. Believing the arson was for financial reasons, Kellerman meets an informant the next morning and pressures him to provide the name of the arsonist. Pembleton and Bayliss go to the pathologist for the autopsy results, only to find that Kellerman has been there ahead of them. Hoping to link the victim to missing persons records, Pembleton goes to the unit specializing in disappearances and encounters his nemesis, Detective Roger Gaffney.

At the station, Howard and Munch both declare that they will sit for the sergeant's exam in hopes of gaining a promotion; the squad begins to stake odds on the outcome. Meanwhile, Captain Megan Russert and Colonel George Barnfather discuss the problems in the unit. Barnfather pressures Russert to improve the unit's clearance rate, hinting that he might replace Al Giardello for being unable to control his detectives and will hold Russert responsible for Gee's "screw-ups".

Kellerman visits the squad room to confer with Bayliss and Pembleton, telling them he believes Matthew Rowland, the owner of the warehouse where the fire took place, is responsible for multiple arson attacks on properties he owns. While they are arguing, Meldrick Lewis informs the detectives that uniformed officers guarding the crime scene have apprehended a teenage girl, Lisa Denardi, who was found poking around in the ruined building. When questioned, she reveals that she and her boyfriend regularly met there at night to have sex; from her evidence, Pembleton and Bayliss conclude that the body is that of her 16-year-old boyfriend, Mark Landry. Kellerman visits a woman claiming to have information about the fire, but she strips naked and tries to seduce him, so Kellerman hurriedly leaves.

At the crime lab, Kellerman explains to Bayliss that tests show that the fire was started with gasoline. Coincidentally, back at the station, Pembleton receives an anonymous tip about the location of the gas can supposedly used to start the fire. The informant, who is only partially seen, declares that it "sucks" that the boy has been killed in the fire; his information leads Pembleton to the gas can. Meanwhile, Bayliss and Kellerman confront Rowland about the arson attacks, but an infuriated Rowland phones contacts at City Hall. As a result of his pressure, Russert tells Kellerman that Rowland was actually in negotiation to sell the warehouse to the city, and orders him to leave Rowland alone.

Fingerprint evidence on the gas can leads to a man called Calvin Jones, who Pembleton and Bayliss go to question. When Jones tries to flee, Pembleton freezes, but soon recovers and helps Bayliss catch him. Jones eventually proves to be a serial "confessor" with no real connection to the crime. After the arrest, Bayliss expresses concern about Pembleton's state of mind following his recent stalking ordeal, and Pembleton reveals that his wife is pregnant. At Gee's insistence, Pembleton canvasses Landry's high school, only for him to find that Landry had no enemies. Bayliss reveals that Denardi's father (who had been a suspect) also has an alibi. Kellerman offers a tentative theory that the arsonist might be someone obsessed with fire.

Russert visits Gee's office to ask about the progress of the investigation. They begin to discuss the staffing problems stemming from the suspension of Bolander and Felton, and Gee reveals that Russert's affair with Felton is common knowledge in the squad. They begin to argue, but are interrupted by news of another arson attack. When Pembleton, Bayliss and Kellerman arrive at the scene, they are told that a body has been spotted inside the burning building. Kellerman admits that Pembleton's theory about Landry's death may have been right.

== Cultural references ==
When the mystery informant calls Pembleton with the tipoff about the fire, he turns up the volume of his car radio, which is playing the Jimi Hendrix version of the Bob Dylan song "All Along The Watchtower", and this music carries through the subsequent sequence.
