= For God and Country (Homicide: Life on the Street) =

- Homicide: Life on the Street episode
- Episode no.: Season 4 Episode 11
- Directed by: Ed Sherin
- Written by: Jorge Zamacona; Michael S. Chernuchin
- Cinematography by: Jean de Segonzac
- Production code: 411
- Original air date: February 9, 1996

Guest appearances
- Željko Ivanek as ASA Ed Danvers; Sagan Lewis as Judge Susan Aandahl; J. K. Simmons as Col. Alexander Rausch; Kevin Geer as Brian Egan; Benjamin Bratt as Det. Reynaldo Curtis; Jill Hennessy as ADA Claire Kincaid; Jerry Orbach as Det. Lennie Briscoe; Harlee McBride as Dr. Alyssa Dyer; Ralph Tabakin as Dr. Scheiner

Episode chronology
← Previous "I've Got a Secret"	Next → "Justice: Part 1"
- Homicide: Life on the Street season 4

"For God and Country" is the 11th episode of the fourth season of the American police drama television series Homicide: Life on the Street. It originally aired on NBC on February 9, 1996. The episode was written by Jorge Zamacona and Michael S. Chernuchin and directed by Ed Sherin.

Aside from a brief cameo by Mike Logan in an earlier episode, "For God and Country" is the first episode to firmly establish a narrative link between Homicide and its sister show, Law & Order. The episode follows the events of Law & Order episode "Charm City".

== Plot summary ==
In New York City, a man named Brian Egan has been arrested for setting off a gas bomb in a subway that killed 20 people. He begs authorities to see to his family's protection in Baltimore, but will not reveal why he fears for their lives until he knows that his son is safe. This prompts the detectives to investigate further. Meanwhile, Egan's family is indeed attacked in Baltimore, leading to his wife's death and his son's attempt to flee the city before Detectives Frank Pembleton and Tim Bayliss chase him down.

NYPD Detectives Lennie Briscoe and Rey Curtis travel to Baltimore to aid in the investigation, and it becomes apparent that the two cases are linked to a gas attack in a Baltimore church five years earlier that killed six people. The investigation leads to the mastermind behind all of the attacks, an anarchist and Special Forces Vietnam War colonel named Alexander Rausch, who reveals that his bomb attacks on black communities were motivated by a desire to start a race war. Though Rausch is in the custody of the Baltimore police, NYC Assistant District Attorney Claire Kincaid demands extradition, creating tension between Pembleton/Bayliss and Briscoe/Curtis and starting a court battle between Kincaid and Baltimore District Attorney Ed Danvers. A Baltimore judge approves Kincaid's extradition order as all the detectives make their peace with each other.

As the detectives escort Rausch to the train station for his return trip to New York, he suffers a heart attack brought on by deliberately failing to take his medication. Pembleton, who had personalized the case, is heartbroken that Rausch has avoided the consequences of his actions.

In a comical subplot, Detective John Munch discovers that, after one of his ex-wives divorced him, she had a brief sexual relationship with Briscoe. Munch also learns that he is not as good a pool player as he thinks, losing $500 to Briscoe in short order.
