= Fire (Part 2) =

- Homicide: Life on the Street episode
- Episode no.: Season 4 Episode 2
- Directed by: Nick Gomez
- Written by: Julie Martin
- Cinematography by: Jean de Segonzac
- Production code: 321
- Original air date: October 27, 1995

Guest appearances
- Stephanie Romanov as Anne Kennedy; Adam Trese as Gavin Robb; Harlee McBride as Dr. Alyssa Dyer; Pat McNamara as Mike Kellerman, Sr.; Frank John Hughes as Zithead Mazursky; Sharon Ziman as Naomi

Episode chronology
← Previous "Fire (Part 1)"	Next → "Autofocus"
- Homicide: Life on the Street season 4

"Fire (Part 2)" is the second, concluding part of the two-part season premiere of the fourth season of the American police drama television series Homicide: Life on the Street. It originally aired on NBC on October 27, 1995. Both parts were written by Julie Martin (from a story by Tom Fontana and Henry Bromell); Part 1 was directed by Tim Hunter, and Part 2 by Nick Gomez. This episode concludes the investigation of a pair of arson-related homicides, led by detectives Pembleton and Bayliss, with their Arson Squad colleague Det. Mike Kellerman.

== Plot summary ==
Soon after the warehouse fire that has killed a teenage boy, another body is found at the scene of a second suspicious fire. The three detectives examine the charred, skeletal remains of the second victim, a young woman. Kellerman deduces that this fire has also been deliberately lit, using gasoline-soaked "trailers" (probably made from toilet paper) and from his observation of the body he theorises that the victim was probably killed elsewhere before the building was set alight. Post-mortem examination reveals that the girl was around 15, and confirms Kellerman's theory that she was probably killed before the fire, by a blow to the head with a hammer. Dental records soon match with a Missing Persons report for a local girl, Bonnie Nash.

While Howard and Munch vie with each other over the upcoming sergeant's exam, Bayliss and Pembleton discuss the duty of informing members of the public about the death of loved ones, on their way to speak to the girl's family. At a bar, Kellerman meets up with his ex-wife, pathologist Dr Anne Kennedy (Stephanie Romanoff) and they bicker about their break-up and Anne chides Mike for his unwillingness to take risks. The next morning he meets his informant, who tells him the two fires were "profit jobs"; he goes on to tell Kellerman that a friend has told him about a man in a blue van who visited the gas station where she works on the night of the second fire, that the man had bought a container of gasoline and (as she subsequently discovers) that he had stolen six rolls of toilet paper. The informant also tells Kellerman that the man had told his friend, in passing, that he was "a chemist". Kellerman tells Giardello about the new lead, and Giardello insists that Pembleton and Kellerman must work together to solve the case.

Pembleton appears on TV to appeal for witnesses to the two fires. When he returns to the squad room, Kellerman complains that his "chemist" lead has turned up nothing, but then Pembleton receives another phone call from his anonymous informant. The mystery man tells Frank that he was at the scene of the second fire and that he saw the arsonist drive away in a blue van, but he refuses to give any other information. When the caller hangs up, Kellerman confirms that they have been able to trace the call. They go to the address, but when the householder returns, they discover that the home has been broken into and ransacked, presumably by the mystery informant.

Russert delights Giardello by telling him that she has secured Barnfather's promise that he will approve the appointment of a new squad member, but the condition is that the squad must clear up the arson murders. With their leads proving fruitless, Giardello orders the team to start the investigation over, so they return to the scene of the first fire. Entering the precinct of the abandoned building, Frank pays for information from a vagrant, who directs them to a homeless old woman, Mrs Rosen. She vacantly tells him that a young man, whom she calls "Mr Rob", had taken her for a ride in his blue van on the night of the fire.

Frustrated, the detectives argue with each other over their inability to crack the case, but then Bayliss scores a breakthrough, finding a match for the elusive blue van in vehicular records, and they bring in the registered owner, Gavin Robb, a young chemistry teacher at a local high school. Under questioning, Robb protests his innocence, explaining that his connection to Mrs Rosen is because he often drives around at night helping homeless people, but he is also forced to admit that Bonnie Nash had been a student in his class the previous year.

Pembleton and Bayliss leave the interrogation room, joining Giardello to observe Kellerman as he interviews Robb alone. They wager that Kellerman will fail and Robb will go free, but Kellerman sets a subtle trap - knowing that the suspect is a dog owner, he tells Robb that a dog had been found burned to death in the second fire. After more questioning, Kellerman appears to give up, and he ends the interview, but as he goes to leave, he springs his trap, casually asking Robb why he had killed the dog. Caught offguard, Robb inadvertently replies, "I didn't know it was there", effectively admitting he had been at the warehouse on the night of the Nash's murder, and he then confesses to the girl's slaying. After the confession, Kellerman reveals that he had tricked Robb because there was no dead dog.

Impressed by Kellerman's breakthrough, Giardello offers him the place in the Homicide squad. Mike initially turns it down, worried that he is not up to the challenge, but after visiting his father at his dead-end job on production line of a local distillery, he returns to the station house to accept Giardello's offer. On the rooftop, Pembleton admits to Bayliss that he is frightened by the prospect of bringing a child into such a dangerous world.
