= 10-8: Officers on Duty =

American police drama television series

- Series stars Ernie Hudson (left) and Danny Nucci
- Genre: Police drama
- Created by: Louis St. Clair; Jorge Zamacona
- Starring: Ernie Hudson; Danny Nucci
- Composers: Danny Lux; Greg O'Connor
- Country of origin: United States
- Original language: English
- No. of seasons: 1
- No. of episodes: 15 (1 unaired)

Production
- Executive producers: Aaron Spelling; E. Duke Vincent; Jorge Zamacona
- Running time: 45–48 minutes
- Production companies: Spelling Television; Badlands Entertainment; Touchstone Television

Original release
- Network: ABC
- Release: September 28, 2003 – January 25, 2004

10-8: Officers on Duty is an American police drama television series created by Louis St. Clair and Jorge Zamacona, that aired on ABC from September 28, 2003 to January 25, 2004. The title is in reference to the ten-code for "officer in service and available for calls."

== Premise ==
Rico Amonte, a rookie deputy sheriff with the Los Angeles County Sheriff's Department, fresh from the police academy is assigned to Senior Deputy John Barnes for his probationary period where he learns the ropes and puts his training into practice.

While he makes his share of rookie mistakes, including being responsible for having a squad car stolen, he also has a keen eye for details exemplified when he is not fooled by a "homeowner" who says he accidentally tripped his home security alarm (the man, who was actually a burglar, had a tattoo of a cross on his arm, but Amonte noticed a mezuzah on the doorpost).

While he passed his initial evaluation, the show was canceled before his final evaluation was completed.

== Cast ==
- Danny Nucci as Deputy Rico Amonte
- Ernie Hudson as Senior Deputy John Henry Barnes
- Mercedes Colon as Sheryl Torres
- Travis Schuldt as Deputy Chase Williams
- Scott William Winters as Senior Deputy Matt Jablonski
- Indigo as Tisha Graves
- Miguel Sandoval as Captain Otis Briggs

== Production ==
10-8: Officers on Duty was created by Louis St. Clair and Jorge Zamacona, who also served as writers. The series was executive produced by Aaron Spelling and E. Duke Vincent. Several of the series' musical pieces were written and recorded by guitarist Arlen Roth.

== Episodes ==
No.	Title	Directed by	Written by	Original release date	Prod. code
1	"Brothers in Arms"	Martin Campbell	S : Louis St. Clair; S/T : Jorge Zamacona	September 28, 2003	001
2	"Hard Day's Night"	Alex Zakrzewski	S : Jorge Zamacona, Louis St. Clair; T : Denitria Harris-Lawrence	October 5, 2003	005
3	"Gun of a Son"	Jeff Bleckner	S : Jorge Zamacona, Louis St. Clair; T : Frank Renzulli	October 12, 2003	004
4	"Badlands"	James Whitmore Jr.	S : Louis St. Clair; S/T : Jorge Zamacona	October 19, 2003	003
5	"Blood, Sugar, Sex Magik"	Thomas J. Wright	S : Louis St. Clair; S/T : Jorge Zamacona	October 26, 2003	006
6	"Mercy, Mercy Me"	Jeff Bleckner	S : Jorge Zamacona; T : Louis St. Clair, Denitria Harris-Lawrence	November 2, 2003	007
7	"Late for School"	Jim Charleston	Jorge Zamacona, Frank Renzulli	November 9, 2003	008
8	"Gimme Shelter"	Jay Tobias	Jorge Zamacona, Frank Renzulli	November 23, 2003	009
9	"Let It Bleed"	Tawnia McKiernan	S : Frank Renzulli, Louis St. Clair; T : Charles Renee Johnson	November 30, 2003	010
10	"The Wild Bunch"	James Whitmore Jr.	S : Louis St. Clair; S/T : Jorge Zamacona	December 7, 2003	011
11	"Lucy in the Sky"	Alex Zakrzewski	S : Denitria Harris-Lawrence, Louis St. Clair; T : Angel Dean Lopez	December 21, 2003	012
12	"Flirtin' with Disaster"	Perry Lang	S : Jorge Zamacona, Louis St. Clair; T : Bradford Winters	January 11, 2004	013
13	"Gypsy Road"	Jeff Bleckner	Jorge Zamacona	January 18, 2004	014
14	"Love Don't Love Nobody"	Thomas J. Wright	S : Jorge Zamacona, Louis St. Clair; T : Denitria Harris-Lawrence	January 25, 2004	015
15	"The Wild and the Innocent"	Martin Campbell	S : Louis St. Clair; S/T : Jorge Zamacona	N/A	002
