= Michael S. Chernuchin =

American television producer and writer

- Born: 1954 (age 71–72)
- Education: University of Michigan
- Occupation: Television writer
- Writing career
- Notable work: Law & Order

Michael S. Chernuchin (born 1954) is an American television writer and producer. He has worked on the NBC crime dramas Law & Order and Brooklyn South. He has won a Producers Guild of America (PGA) Award and an Edgar Award.

== Biography ==
=== Educational background ===
He has a B.A. degree from Dartmouth College, an M.A. degree in English from the University of Michigan, and a J.D. degree from Cornell Law School.

=== 1990s ===
Chernuchin began his television career as a staff writer of the short-lived series Eddie Dodd in 1991.

He was also hired as a writer for the first season of Law & Order in Spring 1991. The series was created by television producer Dick Wolf. Chernuchin contributed to three episodes of the season as a writer. He wrote the teleplay and co-wrote the story (with Michael Duggan) for the two part episode "The Torrents of Greed". He co-wrote the teleplay for the season's penultimate episode "Sonata for Solo Organ" with Joe Morgenstern based on a story by Morgenstern and Duggan. Chernuchin and Morgenstern were nominated for an Edgar Award for Best Episode in a TV Series in 1992 for writing "Sonata for Solo Organ".

He was hired as a story editor for the second season of Law & Order in fall 1991. He wrote the story for the episode "Aria" (teleplay by Christine Roum). He co-wrote the story (with Duggan) and wrote the teleplay for the episode "Misconceptions". He co-wrote the episode "Renunciations" with Morgenstern. He was promoted to executive story editor at the mid-season break. He co-wrote the story and teleplay for the episode "Severance" (with William N. Fordes). He co-wrote the story (with Peter S. Greenberg) and the teleplay (with René Balcer) for the episode "Vengeance". He co-wrote the episode "The Fertile Fields" with Balcer. Finally, he co-wrote the teleplay for the episode "Silence" from a story by Balcer and Duggan. He co-wrote seven episodes for the second season.

He was promoted to co-producer for the third season in 1992. He co-wrote a further eight episodes of the third season; "Conspiracy" (with Balcer), "The Corporate Veil" (with Morgenstern), "Helpless" (with Roum), "Right to Counsel" (with Barry M. Schkolnick), "Night & Fog" (with Balcer), "Conduct Unbecoming" (teleplay with Balcer from a story by Walon Green & Greenberg), "Animal Instinct" (with Sibyl Gardener) and "Virus" (with Balcer). Chernuchin and Balcer won an Edgar Award for Best Episode in a TV Series in 1993 for writing "Conspiracy". They were nominated for the same award in 1994 for writing "Conduct Unbecoming". Also in 1993 Chernuchin and the production staff were nominated for the Emmy Award for outstanding drama series for their work on the third season.

He was promoted to producer for the fourth season in 1993. He wrote or co-wrote a further nine episodes of the fourth season; "Discord", "Black Tie" (with Green), "Apocrypha", "Born Bad" (story with Sally Nemeth, teleplay by Terry Cafolla), "Breeder" (with Balcer), "Mayhem" (story with Balcer, teleplay with Green), "Wager" (story with Harvey Solomon, teleplay by Solomon and Kevin Arkadie), "Sanctuary" (with Fordes) and "Doubles" (with Balcer). In 1994 Chernuchin and Fordes were nominated for the Humanitas Prize in the sixty minutes category for writing the episode "Sanctuary". Also in 1994 Chernuchin and the production staff were nominated for the Emmy Award for outstanding drama series for their work on the fourth season.

He was promoted again to supervising producer for the fifth season in 1994. He co-wrote the season premiere "Second Opinion" (with Jeremy R. Littman), "Competence" (with Mark B. Perry) and "House Counsel" (with Barry M. Schkolnick). He was promoted to co-executive producer mid-season. "Rage", "Seed" (with Janis Diamond) and "Cruel and Unusual" (with Balcer). He wrote or co-wrote six episodes in total for the fifth season. In 1995 Chernuchin and the production staff were nominated for the Emmy Award for outstanding drama series for their work on the fifth season.

He returned as an executive producer for the sixth season in 1995. He wrote a further eight episodes for the sixth season; "Savages" (with Morgan Gendel and Schkolnick), "Paranoia", "Humiliation" (with Schkolnick), "Angel" (with Diamond), "Charm City" (with Jorge Zamacona), "Savior" (with Schkolnick), "Homesick" (story with Schkolnick, teleplay by Schkolnick and Elaine Loeser) and "Aftershock" (story with Diamond, teleplay by Diamond). Chernuchin left the crew at the end of the sixth season. He wrote 37 episodes across the first six seasons of Law & Order. In 1996, Chernuchin and the production staff were nominated for the Emmy Award for outstanding drama series for their work on the sixth season. He was nominated (along with his co-writers) three times for the Writers Guild of America (WGA) Award for best episodic drama at the February 1997 ceremony for his work on the episodes "Aftershock", "Savages" and "Trophy". Chernuchin and the production staff won the Producers Guild of America Award for television producers of the year in episodic at the March 1997 ceremony for their work on the sixth season.

In Spring 1996, he worked as a writer for Homicide: Life on the Street. He co-wrote the fourth season episode "For God and Country" with Zamacona. They also collaborated on the Law & Order episode "Charm City". The episodes were a two-part story and marked the first crossover between Homicide and Law & Order.

He co-wrote the story for the 1996 action movie Eraser with his Law & Order colleague Walon Green and Tony Puryear.

In 1997, he worked as an executive producer for new Dick Wolf series Feds. The series was canceled after only seven episodes.

Also in 1997, he became an executive producer and writer for NBC police drama Brooklyn South. The series focused on a precinct of uniformed police dramas in New York. He contributed to five episodes as a writer for the series single season. He co-wrote the teleplay for the series second episode "Life Under Castro" with series co-creator William M. Finkelstein based on a story by series co-creators David Milch and ex-police officer Bill Clark. He wrote the fourth episode "Touched by a Checkered Cab" solo. He co-wrote the teleplay for the episode "A Reverend Runs Through It" with retired police officer Edward Allen Bernero based on a story by Clark and show runner Steven Bochco. He wrote the teleplay for the episode "Wild Irish Woes" from a story by Bochco, Clark, Finkelstein and Miclh. Finally, he co-wrote the episode "Exposing Johnson" with Bernero. The series was cancelled after airing a 22 episode first season.

In 1998, he worked as an executive producer for the legal drama series Michael Hayes. The series was created by Paul Haggis and John Romano. It was canceled while airing its first season.

=== 2000s ===
In 2000, he created the series Bull. He served as an executive producer and writer on the series single season. The show was about a fledgling stock broker firm. Chernuchin hired Law & Order co-writer Janis Diamond and Brooklyn South co-writer Doug Palau to work on Bull. The series was the first original drama to air on the TNT network and was canceled before completing its first season.

He served as a consulting producer and writer on the first series of action drama 24 in 2001. He wrote the episodes "2:00 p.m.–3:00 p.m." and "4:00 p.m.–5:00 p.m."

In 2002, he rejoined the crew of Law & Order as an executive producer and writer for the series thirteenth season. He personally wrote four episodes for the season; "Shangri-La", "Chosen", "B*tch" and "The Ring", the last an episode that referenced the collapse of the World Trade Center on 9/11 and was dedicated to the memory of his father, Dr. Paul Chernuchin. He wrote the teleplay for the season finale "Smoke" from a story by Dick Wolf. He wrote or co-wrote five episodes of the thirteenth season.

Also in 2002, he worked as a consulting producer and writer on the Law & Order spin-off series Law & Order: Criminal Intent. The series was created by Dick Wolf and developed by Chernuchin's frequent co-writer René Balcer. Chernuchin co-wrote the story for the episode "Malignant" with Balcer and Balcer wrote the teleplay.

He remained an executive producer and writer for the series fourteenth season of Law & Order in 2003. He co-wrote the story for the season opener "Bodies" with William N. Fordes, Fordes also wrote the teleplay for the episode. He wrote the episode "Bounty". He co-wrote the episode "Blaze" with Aaron Zelman and Marc Guggenheim. He co-wrote the episode "Ill-Conceived" with Noah Baymlin and Zelman. He co-wrote the story for the episode "Vendetta" with David Nahmod, Nahmod wrote the teleplay. Chernuchin wrote or co-wrote five episodes of the fourteenth season. In 2004, he was nominated for the WGA award for best episodic drama for the episode "Bounty". He left the production staff (for the second time) after the fourteenth season but continued to occasionally write for the series. In Spring 2006, he wrote the sixteenth season Law & Order episode "Thinking Makes It So". In Fall 2006, he wrote the seventeenth season Law & Order episode "Home Sweet". In 2007, Chernuchin wrote the seventeenth season Law & Order episode "Talking Points".

Later in 2007, Chernuchin co-wrote and executive produced the television feature Fort Pit for NBC. His co-writer was Peter Tolan. The project focused on a precinct of police officers in New York and was devised as a pilot for a series. NBC did not order a series based on the pilot but aired it as a feature.

In 2008, he served as a consulting producer and writer for the legal drama Canterbury's Law. He wrote the episode "What Goes Around".

In 2009, he returned to Law & Order: Criminal Intent as a co-executive producer (and then subsequent show runner sharing the duties with L&O veteran writer Ed Zuckerman, as Robert Nathan had departed) and writer for the eighth season. He wrote the episodes "Folie a Deux", "Lady's Man", "Passion" and "Revolution". Also in 2009, he received credit for three episodes of the British Law & Order spin-off Law & Order: UK. He was credited with providing the basis for the UK episodes "Unloved" (from his episode "Born Bad"), "Alesha" (from his episode "Helpless") and "Sacrifice" (from his episode "Sonata for Solo Organ").

Chernuchin served as showrunner of Chicago Justice, which lasted one season ending in May 2017, after which he became showrunner of Law & Order: Special Victims Unit. He is currently at work on a limited TV series Aztecs, about the last two decades of the Aztec Empire.
