= David Rupel =

David Rupel is an American television soap opera script writer.

== Early life and education ==
Rupel attended Norwell High School in Ossian, Indiana. He is a graduate of Indiana University Bloomington, with a BA in communications, where he graduated magna cum laude.

== Positions held ==
General Hospital

- Script Writer: January 6, 2016 - July 12, 2017; May 6, 2020 – January 24, 2024
- Breakdown Writer: March 12, 2012 - April 27, 2012
- Associate Head Writer: 1999 - 2001

Guiding Light

- Writer: July 24, 2007 - February 29, 2008; April 14, 2008 - September 18, 2009
- Associate Head Writer: August 11, 2006 - July 23, 2007
- Script Writer: 2002

Homicide: Life on the Street

- Writer

In the Heat of the Night

- Writer

Moloney

- Writer

The Young and the Restless

- Breakdown Writer: January 25, 2018 – August 23, 2018

Producer on Meet My Folks, American Princess, The Real Housewives of Orange County, The Real World, Big Brother 2 and Temptation Island.

== Awards and nominations ==
Daytime Emmy Award

- Win, 2007, Best Writing, Guiding Light
- Nomination, 2003, Best Writing, Guiding Light
- Nomination, 2000, Best Writing, General Hospital

Writers Guild of America Award

- Nomination, 2002 & 2006, Best Writing, Guiding Light

People's Choice Awards – Best Reality Series – Temptation Island – 2000
