= Law & Order season 6 =

Season of American television series

Law & Order
- Season 6
- Season 6 U.S. DVD cover
- Starring: Jerry Orbach; Benjamin Bratt; S. Epatha Merkerson; Sam Waterston; Jill Hennessy; Steven Hill
- No. of episodes: 23

Release
- Original network: NBC
- Original release: September 20, 1995 – May 22, 1996

Season chronology
- ← Previous; Season 5 Next → Season 7

The sixth season of Law & Order aired on NBC between September 20, 1995, and May 22, 1996.

== Cast ==
Rey Curtis (played by Benjamin Bratt) replaced season five's Mike Logan (Chris Noth) in the role of Junior Detective. This change left District Attorney Adam Schiff (played by Steven Hill) as the only remaining member of the series' character group from the first season. Hill was not an original member of the cast, as his character replaced District Attorney Alfred Wentworth (played by Roy Thinnes) from the original pilot, "Everyone's Favorite Bagman". Paul Robinette (played by original cast member Richard Brooks) returns in the episode "Custody", his first guest appearance since his departure after season three.

=== Main ===
- Jerry Orbach as Senior Detective Lennie Briscoe
- Benjamin Bratt as Junior Detective Rey Curtis
- S. Epatha Merkerson as Lieutenant Anita Van Buren
- Sam Waterston as Executive Assistant District Attorney Jack McCoy
- Jill Hennessy as Assistant District Attorney Claire Kincaid
  - Jacqueline Hennessy as A.D.A. Claire Kincaid (Hennessy’s twin sister, filled in for Hennessy in episode "Corpus Delicti" due to conflicting schedules)
- Steven Hill as District Attorney Adam Schiff

=== Recurring ===
- Richard Brooks as Defense Attorney Paul Robinette
- Carolyn McCormick as Dr. Elizabeth Olivet
- Leslie Hendrix as M.E. Dr. Elizabeth Rodgers
- John Fiore as Detective Tony Profaci

=== Guest ===
- Richard Brooks as Defense Attorney Paul Robinette
- Richard Belzer as Detective John Munch
- Kyle Secor as Detective Tim Bayliss
- Andre Braugher as Detective Frank Pembleton
- Ellen Pompeo as Jenna Weber
- Tovah Feldshuh as Defense Attorney Danielle Melnick

== Episodes ==
No. overall	No. in season	Title	Directed by	Written by	Original release date	Prod. code	U.S. viewers (millions)
112	1	"Bitter Fruit"	Constantine Makris	René Balcer & Jeremy R. Littman	September 27, 1995	K0105	17.3
Briscoe and his new partner, Det. Reynaldo Curtis, investigate the murder of Jody Gaines, a young girl who disappeared between school and her music lesson, with a blurry film from an ATM as their clue. Cast: First appearance of Benjamin Bratt as Junior Detective Rey Curtis. Note: Based on the Ellie Nesler case.
113	2	"Rebels"	Ed Sherin	T : Ed Zuckerman; S/T : Suzanne O'Malley	October 4, 1995	K0106	13.7
Briscoe and Curtis have a hard time finding cooperative witnesses when investigating the murder of Thomas Bell, a college student, at a rough biker bar.
114	3	"Savages"	Jace Alexander	Morgan Gendal & Barry M. Schkolmick & Michael S. Chernuchin	October 18, 1995	K0103	14.7
McCoy and Kincaid clash over the death penalty as McCoy prosecutes Paul Sandig, a man who murdered Bobby Croft, an undercover cop, during a drug bust. Guest starring: Victor Garber as Paul Sandig
115	4	"Jeopardy"	Christopher Misiano	René Balcer & Jeremy R. Littman	October 25, 1995	K0107	15.0
A dead editor, Eddie Nicodos, reveals a family dispute over the family business. Detectives find out that the victim's brother Peter tried to sabotage the victim's reputation and business to gain new clients for his own competing business, but when forensic evidence is ruled inadmissible, McCoy and Kincaid must refocus their case, leading to a case of sibling rivalry, a protective matriarch, and corrupt judge Edgar Hynes. Guest starring: Louis Zorich as Edgar Hynes
116	5	"Hot Pursuit"	Lewis H. Gould	Ed Zuckerman & Morgan Gendel	November 1, 1995	K0110	17.1
When the detectives solve a series of murders committed by a male and female holdup team in ski masks, McCoy must determine whether Leslie Harlan, the female member, is an unwilling hostage or an active participant in the crimes. Guest starring: Amanda Peet as Leslie Harlan
117	6	"Paranoia"	Fred Gerber	Michael S. Chernuchin	November 8, 1995	K0104	16.7
Briscoe and Curtis try to solve a young woman's murder after a graphic description appears online, while McCoy finds himself up against a lawyer who is reluctant to reveal elements of her client's past. Note: Based on the Dunster House murder–suicide and the Gina Grant case, both occurring at Harvard University.
118	7	"Humiliation"	Matthew Penn	Michael S. Chernuchin & Barry M. Schkolnick	November 15, 1995	K0111	19.2
The investigation into the murder of Gwen George, a prostitute, leads to a married plastic surgeon as the obvious suspect, but Kincaid has a hunch that an elaborate frame-up is in play. Guest starring: Bob Dishy as Defense Attorney Lawrence "Larry" Weaver.
119	8	"Angel"	Arthur W. Forney	Michael S. Chernuchin & Janis Diamond	November 22, 1995	K0114	17.0
A mother, Leah Coleman, claiming that her baby was kidnapped while she was at confession, retraces her steps and actions with Curtis, raising legal questions later when her attorney introduces an unusual defense. Note: Based on the Susan Smith case.
120	9	"Blood Libel"	Constantine Makris	S : René Balcer; S/T : I.C. Rapoport	December 13, 1995	K0109	18.7
A hidden anti-Semitic message in a high school yearbook offers a clue to art teacher Sarah Aronson's murder and leads to a case that matches McCoy against "Klan lawyer" Roy Payne. Payne nefariously involves Detective Briscoe in his defense strategy.
121	10	"Remand"	Jace Alexander	René Balcer & Elaine Loeser	January 10, 1996	K0113	15.6
The victim in a 30-year-old rape and stabbing case is fearful when information received by Briscoe and Curtis could provide grounds for a new trial for the perpetrator. Note: Based on the Kitty Genovese case.
122	11	"Corpus Delicti"	Christopher Misiano	Ed Zuckerman & Barry M. Schkolnick	January 17, 1996	K0115	17.4
The death of a show horse leads to a trial involving insurance fraud, a sting operation, and a wealthy woman's disappearance, with Lyle Christopher as the defendant. Guest starring: Frank Converse as Lyle Christopher. Note: Based on the Helen Brach case.
123	12	"Trophy"	Martha Mitchell	S : Ed Zuckerman; S/T : Jeremy R. Littman	January 31, 1996	K0112	17.3
McCoy finds that his career is on the line when his former assistant and ex-lover accuses him of concealing evidence that helped put an innocent man in prison.
124	13	"Charm City"	Ed Sherin	Michael S. Chernuchin & Jorge Zamacona	February 7, 1996	K0116	19.4
A subway station gas attack, similar to one that took place in a Baltimore church five years earlier, brings Baltimore homicide detectives Tim Bayliss and Frank Pembleton to New York to assist Briscoe and Curtis in apprehending the prime suspect in both incidents. Note: This episode begins a crossover event that concludes on Homicide: Life on the Street season 4 episode 11 "For God and Country". It is included on the third disc of the Season Six DVD set. Cast: Special appearances are made by Richard Belzer as Detective John Munch, Kyle Secor as Detective Tim Bayliss, and Andre Braugher as Detective Frank Pembleton.
125	14	"Custody"	Constantine Makris	S : René Balcer; S/T : Morgan Gendel	February 14, 1996	K0117	14.7
Paul Robinette places the system on trial when he defends a young black woman accused of kidnapping her biological baby from his white, adoptive parents. Cast: Richard Brooks reprises his role as former Assistant District Attorney Paul Robinette.
126	15	"Encore"	Matthew Penn	Ed Zuckerman & Jeremy R. Littman	February 21, 1996	K0120	15.1
After events in "Coma", A jogger killed in Central Park turns out to be the second wife of former comedy club owner Michael Dobson, who was acquitted of killing his first wife. Convicting him this time may hinge on tracing the path of a Colombian coin used as a subway token slug and a mobster that may be involved. Guest starring: Larry Miller as Michael Dobson
127	16	"Savior"	David Platt	Michael S. Chernuchin & Barry M. Schkolnick	February 28, 1996	K0121	15.9
A down-on-his-luck ad executive Ron Weber becomes the prime suspect when his wife Joyce and son Billy are killed and his daughter Jenna wounded on a night that he claims was spent drinking. Guest starring: Ellen Pompeo as Jenna Weber, Shawn Hatosy as Chester Manning
128	17	"Deceit"	Vincent Misiano	René Balcer & Eddie Feldmann	March 27, 1996	K0118	15.3
When Eliot Wells, a young attorney, is murdered shortly after he decides to file a sexual harassment claim against his employer, Briscoe and Curtis discover that the alleged harasser and the harasser's wife each have an excellent motive for murder.
129	18	"Atonement"	Martha Mitchell	S : Ed Zuckerman; S/T : Morgan Gendel	April 10, 1996	K0123	16.2
The investigation into the murder of Sharon Lasko, a cocaine-abusing model, focuses on a nightclub owner, a basketball player, a photographer, and a limousine driver. Guest starring: Michael Imperioli as Johnny Stivers. Note: Imperioli reappears in season 15 in the recurring role of Junior Detective Nick Falco.
130	19	"Slave"	Jace Alexander	René Balcer & Elaine Loeser	April 24, 1996	K0122	12.7
A woman is shot while sleeping and the investigation leads the police to a boy whose crack-addicted mother has entrusted him to a drug dealer's care.
131	20	"Girlfriends"	Christopher Misiano	S : Jeremy R. Littman; T : Suzanne O'Malley; S/T : Ed Zuckerman	May 1, 1996	K0124	13.6
After the body of college student Bridget Kaylin is found, the detectives look for a campus rapist, but the medical examiner's report puts them on a different path involving prostitution.
132	21	"Pro Se"	Lewis H. Gould	René Balcer & I.C. Rapoport	May 8, 1996	K0119	14.6
The investigation into multiple homicides at a clothing store leads to the arrest of a schizophrenic man, James Smith, who presents McCoy with a formidable opponent when he decides to represent himself. Guest starring: Denis O'Hare as James Smith
133	22	"Homesick"	Matthew Penn	S : Michael S. Chernuchin; T : Elaine Loeser; S/T : Barry M. Schkolnick	May 15, 1996	K0126	17.3
After a baby boy found dead in his crib is found to have been poisoned, all evidence points to his English au pair. Defense Attorney Ruth Miller questions the parenting ethic of his mother Wendy Karmel. Guest starring: Patti Lupone as Ruth Miller, and Kim Raver as Wendy Karmel. Note: Based on the Kristie Fischer case.
134	23	"Aftershock"	Martha Mitchell	S : Michael S. Chernuchin; S/T : Janis Diamond	May 22, 1996	K0125	15.0
After Briscoe, Curtis, McCoy, and Kincaid witness the execution of a criminal they brought to justice, their individual reactions to the event culminate in personal misfortune for each of them. Cast: Final appearance of Jill Hennessy as Assistant District Attorney Claire Kincaid.
