= Jorge Zamacona =

American television writer and producer (born 1959)

- Born: December 30, 1959 (age 66); Madigan Army Hospital, Fort Lewis, Washington, U.S.
- Occupations: Screenwriter, television producer
- Writing career
- Notable work: Third Watch

Jorge Zamacona (born December 30, 1959) is an American television writer and producer. He worked extensively on the police drama Homicide: Life on the Street and wrote the series' crossover episodes with the crime drama Law & Order. Zamacona co-created the police dramas 10-8: Officers on Duty and Wanted.

== Biography ==
Zamacona was born on December 30, 1959, in Madigan Army Hospital in Fort Lewis, Washington. He grew up in Madison, Wisconsin. He studied at the University of Wisconsin-Madison until he relocated to Los Angeles in 1980. In 1983, he graduated with a degree in television and film writing and production from California State University-Northridge.

Zamacona is married to Blair Winters Zamacona and has three children.

=== 1980s ===
Zamacona began working for television in 1984 as a writer for the second season of medical drama St. Elsewhere. The series focused on the staff of a declining urban teaching hospital. It was created by Joshua Brand and John Falsey and developed by Mark Tinker and John Masius. He co-wrote the teleplay for the episode "Vanity" with Ray De Laurentis and John Tinker from a story by producer Tom Fontana. He returned as a writer for the third season and co-wrote the teleplay for the episode "Saving Face" with Norma Safford Vela from a story by Fontana.

In 1988, Zamacona wrote the science fiction film World Gone Wild. The film was set in a post apocalyptic future where water is a precious resource.

=== 1990s ===
In 1993, Zamacona became a writer for the first season of NBC police drama Homicide: Life on the Street. The series focused on a single squad of homicide detectives in Baltimore, Maryland. It was based on a non-fiction book by David Simon and created by Paul Attanasio. Zamacona's St. Elsewhere co-writer Tom Fontana was the series executive producer and show runner. Zamacona contributed to two first-season episodes as a writer. He wrote the teleplay for the episodes "A Shot in the Dark" and "And the Rockets' Dead Glare", both were based on stories by Fontana. He returned to the series as a story editor and writer for the third season in 1994. He contributed to six third-season episodes as a writer. Zamacona wrote the teleplay for the episode "Nearer My God to Thee" from a story he wrote with Fontana. Noel Behn wrote the teleplay for the episode "A Model Citizen" from a story from Zamacona and Fontana. He co-wrote the teleplay for the episode "Cradle to Grave" with David Mills from a story by Fontana. He co-wrote the teleplay for the episode "The City That Bleeds" with fellow story editor Julie Martin from a story by Fontana and executive story editor James Yoshimura. He co-wrote the teleplay for the episode "Dead End" with Martin from a story by Yoshimura. Randall Anderson wrote the teleplay for the episode "The Old and the Dead" from a story by Zamacona and co-executive producer Henry Bromell. Zamacona was promoted to producer for the fourth season in 1995. He contributed to a further three episodes as a writer. He wrote the teleplays for the episodes "Thrill of the Kill" and "The Damage Done" both from stories by Fontana and Bromell. He co-wrote the episode "For God and Country" with Michael S. Chernuchin. Zamacona left the production team at the end of the fourth season. Chernuchin and Zamacona also collaborated on the sixth season Law & Order episode "Charm City" in 1996. The episodes were a two-part story and marked the first crossover between Homicide and Law & Order.

In 1996, Zamacona was hired as a co-executive producer and writer for new Fox Network science fiction series Millennium. The series was created by Chris Carter following the success of Carter's earlier series The X-Files. The series follows a law enforcement consultant working for a mysterious organization known as the Millennium Group. Zamacona wrote two episodes for the first season; "Kingdom Come" and "The Wild and the Innocent". Zamacona left the series at the end of the first season.

In 1997, Zamacona returned to Homicide and Law & Order to write a further crossover storyline. He wrote the eighth season Law & Order episode "Baby, It's You" and the sixth season Homicide episode "Baby, It's You: Part 2".

In 1999, Zamacona served as an executive producer and writer for CBS pilot St. Michael's Crossing but the network did not order a series.

=== 2000s ===
In 2001, Zamacona was an executive producer for the feature Hudson's Law which starred Rob Morrow. Zamacona joined the crew of TNT occult police drama Witchblade as a consulting producer and writer in summer 2002. Witchblade follows a homicide detective who acquires super powers after inheriting the titular weapon. The series was created by Ralph Hemecker based on a comic by Marc Silvestri. Zamacoma wrote or co-wrote four episodes for the second season. Hemecker wrote the teleplay for the episode "Emergence" based on a story he co-wrote with Zamacona. Hemecker, Zamacona and William J. Macdonald co-wrote the teleplay for the episode "Destiny" from a story by Zamacona and Macdonald. Zamacona wrote the episodes "Lagrimas" and "Veritas" himself.

In fall 2002, Zamacona was hired as a writer for the third season of NBC emergency services drama Third Watch. The series was created by retired Chicago police officer Edward Allen Bernero and television producer John Wells. The series focused on police officer, firefighters and paramedics working the same shift as one another in New York City. Bernero wrote the teleplay for the episode "Superheroes: Part 1" based on a story he co-wrote with Zamacona. Zamacona co-wrote the episode "The Unforgiven" with producer Scott A. Williams and executive story editor Julie Hébert. Zamacona left the series at the end of the third season having contributed to two episodes.

In 2003, Zamacona reunited with his Homicide colleague Tom Fontana as a supervising producer on the sixth and final season of HBO prison drama Oz. Oz centers on prisoners in a high security unit. The series was created by Fontana and ended in February 2003.

In fall 2003, Zamacona co-created the ABC police drama 10-8: Officers on Duty with Louis St. Clair. Zamacona worked as an executive producer and writer for the series. The series centred on a rookie police officer in Los Angeles County. The other executive producers were Aaron Spelling and E. Duke Vincent. The series was canceled after airing twelve episodes although fifteen episodes were produced. Zamacona contributed to thirteen of those episodes as a writer. Zamacona wrote the teleplay for the pilot episode "Brothers in Arms" from a story he co-wrote with St. Clair. Supervising producer Denitria Harris-Lawrence wrote the teleplay for the episodes "A Hard Day's Night", "Mercy, Mercy Me" and "Love Don't Love Nobody" from stories by Zamacona and St. Clair. Co-executive producer Frank Renzulli wrote the teleplay for the episode "Gun of a Son" from a story by Zamacona and St. Clair. Zamacona wrote the teleplay for the episodes "Badlands", "Blood Sugar Sex Magik", "The Wild Bunch" and "Wild and the Innocent" from stories he co-wrote with St. Clair. Renzulli and Zamacona co-wrote the episodes "Late for School" and "Gimme Shelter". Bradford Winters wrote the teleplay for the episode "Flirtin' with Disaster" from a story by Zamacona and St. Clair. Zamacona wrote the episode "Gypsy Road" solo.

In 2004, Zamacona served as an executive producer for the television feature Silverlake. The film starred Kerr Smith.

Zamacona and St. Clair created a second series in fall 2005. The police drama Wanted aired on the TNT network. Zamacona once again served as an executive producer and writer for the project. Wanted follows a multilateral police taskforce charged with tracking the 100 most wanted criminals. The series other executive producers were again Spelling and Vincent. Zamacona wrote the teleplay for the pilot from a story he co-wrote with St. Clair. Zamacona wrote the teleplay for the episode "The Wild Bunch" from a story he co-wrote with St. Clair. Brian Logan wrote the teleplay for the episode "Click, Click, Boom" from a story by Zamacona and St. Clair.

Zamacona participated in the 2007 Writers Guild of America strike. He supported royalties for writers based on online streaming of episodes they had written.

In 2009, Zamacona became a consulting producer and writer for the ABC police drama The Unusuals. The series was created by Noah Hawley and focused on detectives in the New York homicide unit. The series was canceled after ten episodes. Zamacona wrote the episode "The Dentist".

=== 2010s ===
In 2010, Zamacona was attached to new series The Saint as an executive producer. Following that series, Zamacona served as the Consulting Producer and writer on the TNT show Proof in 2015. The next year, Zamacona stayed with TNT as the Co-Executive Producer and Writer on The Last Ship that starred Eric Dane. Also, in 2016, Zamacona was the Executive Producer on ABC's Quantico starring Priyanka Chopra. In 2019, Zamacona resumed working alongside Tom Fontana for Showtime's City on a Hill , starring Kevin Bacon and Aldis Hodge, as a Co-Executive Producer and writer.
