= Ralph Tabakin =

American actor (1921–2001)

- Born: September 22, 1921; San Antonio, Texas, U.S.
- Died: May 13, 2001 (aged 79); Silver Spring, Maryland, U.S.
- Burial place: Judean Memorial Gardens, Olney, Maryland
- Occupation: Actor
- Spouse: Madolyn Doress (m. 1942; died 1996)
- Children: Two daughters, one granddaughter
- Relatives: Two sisters
- Military service
- Allegiance: United States
- Branch: U.S. Army
- Rank: Staff sergeant
- Conflicts: World War II, D-Day
- Awards: Two Bronze Stars and five Purple Hearts

Ralph Tabakin (September 22, 1921 – May 13, 2001) was an American actor.

== Career ==
In his acting career, Tabakin is most associated with the work of Barry Levinson, as he appeared in fifteen of Levinson's films from Diner onward. His appearance in Diner began after a visit to the set where he impressed Levinson. Considered a lucky charm of Levinson, Tabakin is perhaps best known for playing medical examiner Dr. Scheiner on the Levinson-produced TV series Homicide: Life on the Street, a recurring character from the first episode through all seven seasons and the follow-up Homicide: The Movie.

== Personal life ==
Born in San Antonio, Texas, he was the middle child in a family of five. They would also live in New Orleans, Louisiana, before moving and settling in Richmond, Virginia. He was a World War II veteran, being decorated with five Purple Hearts and two Bronze Stars. He also worked as a Federal Aviation Administration engineer for several years. He died in 2001 due to heart disease. He is buried in Judean Memorial Gardens in Olney, Maryland.

== Filmography ==
Year	Title	Role	Notes
1982	Diner	TV Customer	
1984	The Natural	Al's Customer	
1985	Young Sherlock Holmes	Policeman in Shop Window	
1987	Tin Men	Mr. Hudson	
1987	Good Morning, Vietnam	Chaplain Noel	
1988	Rain Man	Shift Boss	with Dustin Hoffman
1990	Avalon	Principal Dunn	
1991	Bugsy	Elevator Operator	
1992	Toys	Fred	
1994	Jimmy Hollywood	Fan in Hospital	
1994	Disclosure	Elevator Attendant	
1996	Sleepers	Warden	with Dustin Hoffman
1997	Wag the Dog	Southern Man	with Dustin Hoffman
1998	Sphere	O.S.S.A. Official	with Dustin Hoffman
1999	Liberty Heights	Phil, Spotlight Man at the Gaitey	

== See also ==
- Late bloomer
