= Edward Gold =

American composer (1936–2022)

Edward Gold (July 25, 1936 – March 2, 2022) was an American pianist and composer.

== Early life and education ==
Gold was born and raised in Brooklyn, New York and lived most of his adult life in Manhattan.

Gold attended public schools and majored in music at CCNY (today part of the City University of New York). He received his masters from Yale University School of Music where he studied with Ellsworth Grumman, Mel Powell and H. Leroy Baumgartner. Edward also studied with Nadia Reisenberg at the Mannes College of Music.

== Career ==
After completing his studies, Gold worked as a pianist and toured internationally. The recording of Gottschalk Piano Music (1973) on which he performed was named a "Recording of Special Merit" by Stereo Review. His recordings were also noted by The American Record Guide and The Musical Quarterly.

Early on, Edward's music was in the style of atonality (mostly Schoenberg), but with a traditional structural style using atonal and twelve-tone techniques crossed with some Stravinsky. But he largely turned away from these styles after leaving Yale. Over the course of his career, Gold's work was both eclectic and independent. He composed most often for orchestra, piano, chamber ensemble or various vocalists with or without accompaniment. He was a member of the tonality-based Delian Society but also composed at times in a structurally based atonal style.

== Death ==
Gold died from an undetermined form of dementia on March 2, 2022, at the age of 85.

== Works ==
Selected works include:

- Piano Variations (1959)
- Mass of John the Baptist (for three-part men's voices and organ, 1972)
- Sonatina for Flute and Piano (c. 1985)
- Schratlieder (settings for bass-baritone and piano of poems by Reinhard Paul Becker (1986)
- Carillon for Choir, Tuned Percussion, and Strings (c. 1996)
- Five Memorials (for various ensembles, 1996–97)
- Wind Quartet (2004)
- Symphonies on Ancient Tunes
- The Picture of Dorian Gray (for piano, four hands, 2006)
- Central Park Suite (orchestral version)

=== Discography ===
Gold's performances have been recorded and issued on media, including:

- Gottschalk Piano Music (1973)
- Piano Music of J.L. Dussek (1974)
- Romantic Cello Encores with Albert Catell (1971)
- Music by Israeli Composers (1973)
