= Homicide: Life on the Street =

American police drama series (1993–1999)

- Genre: Crime drama; Police procedural
- Created by: Paul Attanasio
- Based on: Homicide: A Year on the Killing Streets by David Simon
- Starring: Daniel Baldwin; Richard Belzer; Andre Braugher; Clark Johnson; Yaphet Kotto; Melissa Leo; Jon Polito; Kyle Secor; Ned Beatty; Isabella Hofmann; Reed Diamond; Max Perlich; Michelle Forbes; Peter Gerety; Jon Seda; Callie Thorne; Giancarlo Esposito; Toni Lewis; Michael Michele; Željko Ivanek
- Country of origin: United States
- Original language: English
- No. of seasons: 7
- No. of episodes: 122 (list of episodes)

Production
- Executive producers: Tom Fontana; Barry Levinson; Henry Bromell; Jim Finnerty
- Producers: Gail Mutrux; Julie Martin; James Yoshimura; Jorge Zamacona; Anya Epstein; David Simon
- Running time: 44–49 minutes
- Production companies: Baltimore Pictures; Reeves Entertainment (1993, season 1); MCEG Sterling Incorporated (1994–1999, seasons 2–7); Fatima Productions; NBC Productions (1994–1996, seasons 3–4); NBC Studios (1996–1999, seasons 5–7)

Original release
- Network: NBC
- Release: January 31, 1993 – May 21, 1999

Related
- Homicide: Second Shift; Homicide: The Movie; Law & Order

Homicide: Life on the Street is an American police drama television series chronicling the work of a fictional version of the Baltimore Police Department's Homicide Unit. It ran for seven seasons and 122 episodes on NBC from January 31, 1993, to May 21, 1999, and was succeeded by Homicide: The Movie (2000), which served as the series finale. The series was created by Paul Attanasio and based on David Simon's book Homicide: A Year on the Killing Streets (1991). Many of the characters and stories used throughout the show were based on events depicted in the book.

While Homicide featured an ensemble cast, Andre Braugher emerged as a breakout star through his portrayal of Detective Frank Pembleton. The show won TCA Award for Outstanding Achievement in Drama in 1996, 1997, and 1998. It also became the first drama ever to win three Peabody Awards for Drama, those being in 1993, 1995, and 1997. It received recognition from the Directors Guild of America Awards, Humanitas Prize, Q Awards, Writers Guild of America Awards and Primetime Emmy Awards. In 1997, the fifth-season episode "Prison Riot" was ranked No. 32 on TV Guide's 100 Greatest Episodes of All Time.

In 1996, TV Guide named the series "The Best Show You're Not Watching". The show placed #46 on Entertainment Weekly's "New TV Classics" list. In 2007, it was listed as one of TIME magazine's "Best TV Shows of All-TIME." In 2013, TV Guide ranked it #55 on its list of the 60 Best Series of All Time.

== Production ==
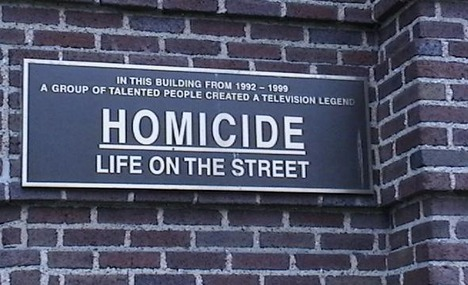
Homicide: Life on the Street sign at the City Recreation Pier in Fell's Point, Baltimore

Homicide: Life on the Street was adapted from Homicide: A Year on the Killing Streets, a non-fiction book by Baltimore Sun reporter David Simon, based on his experience following a Baltimore Police Department homicide unit in 1988. Simon, who became a consultant and producer with the series, said he was particularly interested in the debunking of the American detective. While detectives are typically portrayed as noble characters who care deeply about their victims, Simon believed real detectives regarded violence as a normal aspect of their jobs.

Simon sent the book to film director and Baltimore native Barry Levinson with the hopes that it would be adapted into a film, but Levinson thought it would be more appropriate material for television because the stories and characters could be developed over a longer period of time. Levinson believed that a television adaptation would bring a fresh and original edge to the police drama genre because the book exploded many of the myths of the police drama genre by highlighting that cops did not always get along with each other and that criminals occasionally got away with their crimes.

Levinson approached screenwriter Paul Attanasio with the material, and Homicide became Attanasio's first foray into television writing. All episodes of Homicide display the credit, "Created by Paul Attanasio" at the end of their opening sequence, a credit which both Eric Overmyer and James Yoshimura dispute on the DVD audio commentary to the season 5 episode, "The Documentary", claiming instead the show was created by Tom Fontana and Yoshimura. The series title was originally Homicide: A Year on the Killing Streets, but NBC changed it so that viewers would not believe it was limited to a single year; the network also believed the use of the term "life" would be more reaffirming than the term "killing streets". Levinson was indifferent to the change, asserting that viewers would probably casually refer to the series as "Homicide" in either case. The opening theme music was composed by Baltimore native Lynn F. Kowal, a graduate of the Peabody Institute of the Johns Hopkins University in Baltimore.

The greatest lie, I think, in dramatic TV is the cop who stands over a body and pulls up the sheet and mutters, 'Damn' and looks down sadly. To a real homicide detective, it's just a day's work.

— David Simon

Homicide's purpose was to provide its viewers with a no-nonsense, police procedural-type glimpse into the lives of a squad of inner-city detectives. As opposed to many television shows and movies involving cops, Homicide initially opted for a bleak sort of realism in its depiction of "The Job", portraying it as repetitive, spiritually draining, an existential threat to one's psyche, often glamour- and glory-free—but, nonetheless, a social necessity. In its attempt to do so, Homicide developed a trademark feel and look that distinguished itself from its contemporaries. For example, the series was filmed with hand-held 16 mm cameras almost entirely on-location in Baltimore (making the idiosyncratic city something of a character itself). It also regularly used music montages, jump cut editing, and the three-times-in-a-row repetition of the same camera shot during particularly crucial moments in the story. The episodes were also noted for interweaving as many as three or four storylines in a single episode. NBC executives often asked the writers to focus on a single homicide case rather than multiple ones, but the show producers tended to resist this advice.

Despite premiering in the coveted post-Super Bowl time slot, the show opened to lackluster ratings, and cancellation was an immediate threat. However, the show's winning of two Emmy Awards (for Levinson's direction of "Gone for Goode" and Fontana's writing of "Three Men and Adena") and the success of another police drama—the more sensational NYPD Blue—helped convince NBC to give it another chance beyond the truncated, nine-episode-long first season. Homicide consistently ranked behind ABC's 20/20 and CBS's Nash Bridges in the Nielsen ratings. Despite the poor ratings, reviews were consistently strong from the beginning of the series. Commentators were especially impressed with the high number of strong, complex, well-developed and non-stereotypical African American characters like Pembleton, Lewis and Giardello.

The police department scenes were shot at the historic City Recreation Pier in Fells Point neighborhood in Baltimore. Although NBC occasionally pressured the show's producers to write happy endings to the homicide cases, the network gave an unusual amount of freedom for the writers to create darker stories and non-traditional detective story elements, like unsolved cases where criminals escape. Nevertheless, in its attempt to improve Homicide's ratings, NBC often insisted on changes, both cosmetic and thematic. For example, by the beginning of the third season, talented but unphotogenic veteran actor Jon Polito had been ordered dropped from the cast.

The show was originally a production of Baltimore Pictures in association with Thames Television's subsidiary studio Reeves Entertainment, an American studio. In between the first and second season, Reeves had closed due to Pearson plc's acquisition of their parent company Thames, and the latter's requirement of either spinning off the studio or transferring their existing properties still in production which included Home in late 1993. After the four-episode second season had aired, NBC negotiated with Thames and MCEG Sterling Entertainment, who oversaw and held interest on the Homicide property on behalf of Thames, on the show's renewal for an order for a third season alongside taking over co-ownership, co-production duties, and copyright, though Pearson (whose television division and library is now owned by Fremantle) continued to hold international distribution rights outside of North America.

The reality of Homicide's low Nielsen ratings hovered over all things, however, and always left the show in a precarious position; it also had a harder time gaining a large audience because fewer viewers are at home watching TV on Friday nights. Despite this, the network managed to keep what TV Guide referred to as "The Best Show You're Not Watching" on the air for five full seasons and seven seasons in all. In July 1997, NBC gave the series producers an ultimatum to make Homicide more popular than Nash Bridges or face cancellation. When this goal was not reached, the studio gave serious consideration to canceling the show, but a number of shocks at NBC increased Homicide's value. Among those factors were the loss of the popular series Seinfeld and the $850 million deal needed to keep ER from leaving the network.

Re-runs of Homicide were, at one time, syndicated on Lifetime and Court TV as well as the all-crime television cable station Sleuth, and re-aired on WGN America. Episodes of Homicide have re-aired on TNT as part of several crossovers the series had with Law & Order, for which TNT once owned the broadcast rights. In these cases, both crossover episodes re-aired back to back. Its re-runs were recently televised on the Centric channel.

All seven seasons are available on DVD. One DVD set combines the first two seasons. Additional sets contain the complete third, fourth, fifth, sixth, and seventh seasons. A boxed set shaped like a filing cabinet features an additional disc containing Homicide: The Movie and the relevant Law & Order crossover episodes – those without this disc had to rely on Law & Order recap clips on the season DVDs. Significantly, the DVDs contain the episodes in the producers' intended order, not the order in which NBC aired them.

The show has spawned changes in the real life Baltimore Homicide Unit. As seen in the show, the unit originally used a dry-erase board in order to visually track detectives' progress at solving crimes. After the show began to air, the Baltimore Police Department discontinued the practice, believing the board, which concentrated on "clearance rates" for crimes, had a negative impact on publicity. It was brought back later at the insistence of the detectives.

As of August 19, 2024, all seven seasons are available to stream on NBCUniversal's Peacock service, although cropped to widescreen format and with some music changed.

== Characters ==
Character	Portrayed by	Occupation	Seasons							
Character	Portrayed by	Occupation	1	2	3	4	5	6	7	Movie
Beau Felton	Daniel Baldwin	Detective	Main	Main	Main					Main
John Munch	Richard Belzer	Detective	Main	Main	Main	Main	Main	Main	Main	Main
Frank Pembleton	Andre Braugher	Detective	Main	Main	Main	Main	Main	Main		Main
Meldrick Lewis	Clark Johnson	Detective	Main	Main	Main	Main	Main	Main	Main	Main
Al Giardello	Yaphet Kotto	Lieutenant	Main	Main	Main	Main	Main	Main	Main	Main
Kay Howard	Melissa Leo	Detective / Sergeant	Main	Main	Main	Main	Main			Main
Steve Crosetti	Jon Polito	Detective	Main	Main						Main
Tim Bayliss	Kyle Secor	Detective	Main	Main	Main	Main	Main	Main	Main	Main
Stanley Bolander	Ned Beatty	Detective	Main	Main	Main					Main
Megan Russert	Isabella Hofmann	Lieutenant / Captain / Detective			Main	Main	Recurring			Main
Mike Kellerman	Reed Diamond	Detective / Private Investigator				Main	Main	Main	Guest	Main
J. H. Brodie	Max Perlich	Crime Scene Videographer				Recurring	Main			Main
Julianna Cox	Michelle Forbes	Chief Medical Examiner					Main	Main		Main
Stuart Gharty	Peter Gerety	Officer / Detective / Lieutenant				Guest	Recurring	Main	Main	Main
Paul Falsone	Jon Seda	Detective					Recurring	Main	Main	Main
Laura Ballard	Callie Thorne	Detective						Main	Main	Main
Michael Giardello	Giancarlo Esposito	FBI Agent / Officer							Main	Main
Terri Stivers	Toni Lewis	Detective					Recurring	Recurring	Main	Main
Rene Sheppard	Michael Michele	Detective							Main	Main
Ed Danvers	Željko Ivanek	Assistant State's Attorney	Recurring	Recurring	Recurring	Recurring	Recurring	Recurring	Recurring	Main

=== Recurring cast members ===
Homicide featured a number of recurring characters, who starred alongside the ensemble. Wendy Hughes (Carol Blythe), Ami Brabson (Mary Pembleton) and Željko Ivanek (Ed Danvers) are the most notable, with the first appearing in Season 1, and the other two appearing in Seasons 1–6 and Seasons 1–7 respectively. Clayton LeBouef played Captain and later Colonel George Barnfather throughout the run. Ralph Tabakin played Dr. Scheiner in all seven seasons. The recurring cast also included: Gerald F. Gough as Colonel Burt Granger (seasons 1–3); Lee Tergesen as Officer Chris Thormann (seasons 1, 3 and 5); Sean Whitesell as Dr. Eli Devilbiss (seasons 1, 3, 4, 6 and 7); Michael Willis as Darin Russom (seasons 1–7); Sharon Ziman as Naomi (seasons 1–7); Judy Thornton as Judy (seasons 2–7); Herb Levinson as Dr. Lausanne (seasons 2–7); Gary D'Addario as Lieutenant Jasper (seasons 3–7); Walt MacPherson as Captain Roger Gaffney (seasons 3–7); Harlee McBride as Alyssa Dyer (seasons 3–7); Rhonda Overby as Reporter Dawn Daniels (seasons 3–7); Kristin Rohde as Officer Sally Rogers (seasons 3–7); Laurie Kennedy as City Attorney Felicity Weaver (seasons 3–6); Mary B. Ward as Beth Felton (season 3); Christopher Meloni as bounty hunter Dennis Knoll (season 7); Erik Dellums as Luther Mahoney (seasons 4 and 5); Mekhi Phifer as Junior Bunk (seasons 5 and 6); Hazelle Goodman as Georgia Rae Mahoney (season 6); Ellen McElduff as Billie Lou Hatfield (seasons 5–7); Austin Pendleton as Dr. George Griscom (season 7), and Jason Stanford as Joe Ryblack (seasons 6 and 7). Joey Perillo as Bernard Munch (Seasons 3 and 6).

=== Notable guest appearances ===
A number of well-known actors and celebrities appeared on the show, including Steve Allen, Lewis Black, Wilford Brimley, Steve Burns, Steve Buscemi, Bruce Campbell, Joan Chen, Heather Brown Dodge, Vincent D'Onofrio, Jeffrey Donovan, Tate Donovan, Charles Durning, Charles S. Dutton, Richard Edson, Kathryn Erbe, Edie Falco, Peter Gallagher, Paul Giamatti, John Glover, Moses Gunn, Luis Guzmán, Jake Gyllenhaal, Marcia Gay Harden, Neil Patrick Harris, Pat Hingle, James Earl Jones, Terry Kinney, Bruno Kirby, Jay Leno, Tony LoBianco, Julianna Margulies, Jena Malone, Nancy Marchand, Anne Meara, Christopher Meloni, David Morse, Terry O'Quinn, Joe Perry, Chris Rock, J. K. Simmons, Fisher Stevens, Jerry Stiller (in a different season from wife Anne Meara), Eric Stoltz, Tony Todd, Lily Tomlin, Kate Walsh, Isaiah Washington, John Waters, Robin Williams, Dean Winters, Elijah Wood, and Alfre Woodard. Jason Priestley joined the cast in the climactic television movie, during which his character referred to Pembleton and Bayliss as "legends". Typically, well-known actors making guest appearances on Homicide were cast in fully developed roles central to the episode in which they appeared. Robin Williams's portrayal of a grieving widower and father in the second-season episode, "Bop Gun", is a notable example, as is Steve Buscemi's role as a suspected gunman in the third-season episode "End Game".

Some celebrities made cameo appearances that were more lighthearted in style. Director (and Baltimore native) John Waters—who called the show "the grittiest, best-acted, coolest-looking show on TV"—appeared twice, once as a nameless bartender listening to a disconsolate Detective Bolander, and another time as a talkative prisoner transferred from New York to Baltimore by Detective Mike Logan (played by Chris Noth). Waters and Noth received "special thanks" in the episode's closing credits. Out traveling on his motorcycle, Jay Leno stopped in at the Waterfront to have a soft drink, quickly departing after finding his bartenders strangely silent. In one particularly self-referential episode, journalist Tim Russert appeared as himself, bickering about birthday presents with his cousin, Lieutenant Megan Russert. Film director Barry Levinson, who also executive produced Homicide, acted as himself directing an episode for a show-within-a-show called Homicide in the episode, "The Documentary".

Psychobilly performer The Reverend Horton Heat made a brief appearance as Preacher Lemuel Galvin, a resident at a motel where the killing of a biker is investigated. In Season 4, Episode 2, "Fire (Part 2)", Baltimore-based punk rock band Estrojet (previously known as Womyn of Destruction) can be seen onstage at a club performing their song "Magnet"; Detective Kellerman has a date with one of the members; they can be seen embracing at the end of the scene.

The Mayor of Baltimore (Kurt Schmoke) and the Governor of Maryland (Parris Glendening) made brief appearances in the episode about the death of Beau Felton, appearing at the memorial press conference for Felton's death in the line of duty.

Recurring characters of particular note include the Mahoney crime family. Luther Mahoney, played by Erik Dellums, appears in seasons four and five. Mahoney is a crime and drug kingpin who uses others to do his dirty work and masterfully manipulates the law to repeatedly escape conviction and hide his connection to the crimes committed by his underlings. At first, he is depicted as an almost friendly rival, with both Mahoney and the police mutually amused by Mahoney's antics. Gradually, however, the police—particularly Kellerman and Lewis—grow frustrated with Mahoney, until Lewis viciously beats him during an arrest, and Kellerman fatally shoots Mahoney under questionable circumstances.

In the following season, the Mahoney organization is taken over by Luther's sister Georgia Rae, played by Hazelle Goodman, who seeks both legal and illegal revenge against the Baltimore Police Department.

Mekhi Phifer makes several appearances as Junior Bunk, a dim-witted street thug who is initially depicted as someone with the potential to go straight. His crimes grow increasingly violent, however, and in his final appearance he is revealed to be Georgia Rae's son, with the real name "Nathaniel Lee Mahoney".

== Episodes ==
Season	Episodes	Originally released	
Season	Episodes	First released	Last released
1	9	January 31, 1993	March 31, 1993
2	4	January 6, 1994	January 27, 1994
3	20	October 14, 1994	May 5, 1995
4	22	October 20, 1995	May 17, 1996
5	22	September 20, 1996	May 16, 1997
6	23	October 17, 1997	May 8, 1998
7	22	September 25, 1998	May 21, 1999
Television film		February 13, 2000	

== Plot ==
Several regulars from across the series's seven-year run. Left to right: Ned Beatty, Clark Johnson, Richard Belzer, Melissa Leo, Kyle Secor, Andre Braugher, Callie Thorne, Yaphet Kotto, Peter Gerety, Toni Lewis, Jon Seda.

=== Seasons 1 and 2 ===
The first season saw the introductions of Detectives Frank Pembleton (Andre Braugher), Stan Bolander (Ned Beatty), Kay Howard (Melissa Leo), Meldrick Lewis (Clark Johnson), John Munch (Richard Belzer), Tim Bayliss (Kyle Secor), Beau Felton (Daniel Baldwin) and Steve Crosetti (Jon Polito), as well as the Commander, Lieutenant Al Giardello (Yaphet Kotto).

=== Season 3 ===
The third season saw the first changes in the character lineup; when Detective Steve Crosetti (Jon Polito) was not seen in any episodes, his body was found in a death by suicide in the sixth episode of the season. Isabella Hofmann joined the cast as Lieutenant Megan Russert, the commander of the other Homicide shift, it also dealt with her promotion to captain, and saw the last appearances of Felton and Bolander (Daniel Baldwin and Ned Beatty).

=== Seasons 4 and 5 ===
The fourth season saw the departure of Daniel Baldwin and Ned Beatty, who played Beau Felton and Stan Bolander respectively. In the story, the two detectives had recently been given a 22-week suspension, as related in the opening scene of the season's first episode. Bolander went on to retirement, and Felton, recruited for deep undercover work, was killed (off-screen) in the line of duty during the fifth season. The characters returned in the movie. This season also sees Mike Kellerman (Reed Diamond) join the cast. Isabella Hofmann (newly demoted, Detective Megan Russert) left at the end of Season 4, but returned in the Season 5 finale, in which she, Kay Howard (Melissa Leo) and J. H. Brodie (Max Perlich) made their last appearances. Season 5 also saw the addition of Chief Medical Examiner Julianna Cox (Michelle Forbes) and Detective Terri Stivers (Toni Lewis).

=== Season 6 ===
The sixth season was the first not to feature Leo as Sergeant Kay Howard, and the last to feature Braugher as Detective Frank Pembleton and Forbes as Chief Medical Examiner Julianna Cox. Jon Seda, Callie Thorne and Peter Gerety joined the cast as Detectives Paul Falsone, Laura Ballard and Stuart Gharty. J.H. Brodie (Max Perlich) is no longer present, nor is Detective Meg Russert (Isabella Hofmann).

=== Season 7 ===
Following the events of the sixth-season finale, Detective Frank Pembleton (Braugher) and Detective Mike Kellerman (Diamond) are no longer regulars; neither is Chief Medical Examiner Julianna Cox (Forbes), who left mid-season. Braugher and Forbes did not return until the movie, while Diamond made a two-episode guest appearance. Michael Michele stars in this season as Detective Rene Sheppard and Giancarlo Esposito is cast as Giardello's son Mike, who is assigned to Homicide as an FBI Liaison.

=== Homicide: The Movie ===
In 2000, following the conclusion of the series, a television film titled Homicide: The Movie was produced and aired on NBC. The squad's former Lieutenant, Al Giardello, was running for mayor on a controversial pro-drug-legalization platform, and is close to victory when he is gunned down. The assassination attempt inspires the return of the entire unit, past and present, in an effort to apprehend the gunman.

A draft of the film's shooting script was leaked onto the Internet ahead of its premiere, bearing the title Homicide: Life Everlasting. While not officially used by NBC, that title has been adopted by fans.

== Crossovers ==
Homicide: Life on the Street executive producer Tom Fontana and Law & Order creator Dick Wolf became close friends in the 1980s while working as writers in the same building, at the same time, on the series St. Elsewhere (Fontana) and Hill Street Blues (Wolf).

In the 1990s, the two friends decided to do a small crossover between their (then) current shows, with Law & Order NYPD Detective Mike Logan (Chris Noth) delivering a fugitive to Homicide: Life on the Street's Detective Frank Pembleton during the prologue of the third-season episode "Law & Disorder".

The concept proved popular with fans and with both Fontana and Wolf. As of the 2015–2016 television season, this first crossover by Wolf has been followed by 15 other crossover stories in his numerous Law & Order and Chicago franchises. Fontana expanded the Homicide: Life on the Street crossovers to include characters from St. Elsewhere, years after that series had ended its run. Wolf would adopt the same post-cancellation crossover concept when Homicide: Life on the Street characters Meldrick Lewis and Billie Lou Hatfield (Ellen McElduff) appeared, 14 years after their series ended, at John Munch's retirement party from the NYPD on the Law & Order: Special Victims Unit episode "Wonderland Story".

Homicide Episode	Crossover Series	Nature of crossover
"Law & Disorder"	Law & Order	Chris Noth has a cameo in the prologue as NYPD Detective Mike Logan, arriving at Baltimore's Penn Station to deliver a prisoner to Detective Frank Pembleton.
"A Doll's Eyes"	Chicago Hope	The organs of a Baltimore murder victim are shipped to various hospitals across the country. The heart is placed in a cooler with the destination label "Chicago Hope Hospital", and during a montage is received in Chicago by a heart surgeon played by Mandy Patinkin presumably as Chicago Hope's Dr. Jeffrey Geiger.
"For God and Country"	Law & Order	This episode acts as the conclusion of a two-part crossover with the Law & Order episode "Charm City", which aired two nights earlier.; Law & Order characters appearing on this episode of Homicide: Life on the Street were Jerry Orbach as NYPD Detective Lennie Briscoe, Benjamin Bratt as NYPD Detective Rey Curtis, Jill Hennessy as New York ADA Claire Kincaid.
"Baby, It's You (Part 2)"	Law & Order	This episode acts as the conclusion of a two-part crossover with the Law & Order episode "Baby, It's You (Part 1)", which aired two nights earlier.; Law & Order characters appearing on this episode of Homicide: Life on the Street were Jerry Orbach as NYPD Detective Lennie Briscoe, Benjamin Bratt as NYPD Detective Rey Curtis, Sam Waterston as New York Executive ADA Jack McCoy, Carey Lowell as New York ADA Jamie Ross.
"Unusual Suspects"	The X-Files	The episode opens in medias res in 1989, when a SWAT team conducts a raid on a Baltimore warehouse. Inside, they find a naked and disoriented FBI Special Agent Fox Mulder David Duchovny in a box, shouting, "They're here!" Three men attempt to flee the scene and are captured; they are revealed to be the Lone Gunmen. As they sit in a city jail, they begin blaming each other for the predicament they have found themselves in. Detective John Munch interrogates John Fitzgerald Byers, who tries to explain what happened.
"Mercy"	St. Elsewhere	Alfre Woodard reprises her St. Elsewhere role as Dr. Roxanne Turner.
"Sideshow (Part 2)"	Law & Order	This episode acts as the conclusion of a two-part crossover with the Law & Order episode "Sideshow (Part 1)", which aired two nights earlier.; Law & Order characters appearing on this episode of Homicide: Life on the Street were NYPD Detective Lennie Briscoe, Benjamin Bratt as NYPD Detective Rey Curtis, Sam Waterston as New York Executive ADA Jack McCoy, and S. Epatha Merkerson as NYPD Lieutenant Anita Van Buren (uncredited, in opening flashback).
Series regular	Law & Order: Special Victims Unit	John Munch, created for Homicide: Life on the Street and played by Richard Belzer, moved to New York and joined the NYPD's Special Victims Unit for 15 years (15 seasons of Law & Order: Special Victims Unit).
Homicide: The Movie	St. Elsewhere and Law & Order: Special Victims Unit	Ed Begley Jr. plays a surgeon identified in the closing credits as his St. Elsewhere character, Dr. Victor Ehrlich.; Now a regular character on Law & Order: Special Victims Unit, NYPD Detective John Munch (Richard Belzer) returns to Baltimore to help investigate the shooting of Al Giardello.
Series regular	Multiple	Combined with being a multi-season character on Homicide: Life on the Street and Law & Order: Special Victims Unit, John Munch (played by Richard Belzer) has been credited 459 times, on a total of 9 different television shows across five different networks, including Law & Order, The X-Files, The Beat, Law & Order: Trial by Jury, Arrested Development, The Wire, 30 Rock, Unbreakable Kimmy Schmidt, and American Dad!.
Series regulars	Law & Order: Special Victims Unit	When Detective Munch retired from the NYPD, 13 years after Homicide: The Movie aired, Homicide: Life on the Street characters Detective Meldrick Lewis (Clark Johnson) and Munch's ex-wife Billie Lou Hatfield (Ellen McElduff) were present at his New York party, on the Law & Order: Special Victims Unit episode "Wonderland Story".

== Ratings ==
Season	Episodes	Time Slot (ET)	Season premiere	Airdate	U.S. Viewers (in millions)	Season finale	Airdate	U.S. Viewers (in millions)	TV Season	Nielsen ratings (in millions)
1	9	Wednesday at 9:00 pm	“Gone for Goode”	January 31, 1993	28.9	"Night of the Dead Living" (Note: Originally written as the third episode, "Night of the Dead Living" was moved to become the season finale at the insistence of NBC executives)	March 31, 1993	9.7	1992–93	8.7
2	4	Thursday at 10:00 pm	"Bop Gun" (Note: When first shown on NBC, "Bop Gun" aired out of order as the season premiere due to a guest appearance by Robin Williams)	January 6, 1994	24.9	"A Many Splendored Thing"	January 27, 1994	16.4	1993–94	12.7
3	20	Friday at 10:00 pm	“Nearer My God To Thee”	October 14, 1994	11.0	“The Gas Man”	May 5, 1995	10.0	1994–95	7.8
4	22	Friday at 10:00 pm	“Fire (Part 1)”	October 20, 1995	13.0	“Worked Related”	May 17, 1996	13.0	1995–96	8.5
5	22	Friday at 10:00 pm	“Hostage, Part 1”	September 20, 1996	11.0	“Strangers and Other Things”	May 16, 1997	11.0	1996–97	7.7
6	23	Friday at 10:00 pm	“Blood Ties, Part 1”	October 17, 1997	11.4	“Fallen Heroes, Part 2”	May 8, 1998	12.2	1997–98	7.5
7	22	Friday at 10:00 pm	“La Flamiglia”	September 25, 1998	9.85	“Forgive Us Our Trespasses”	May 21, 1999	11.4	1998–99	10.2

== Awards and nominations ==
Association	Year (Note: The listed year refers to the date of the ceremony, not necessarily the year in which the corresponding season or episode aired)	Category	Nominee(s)	Result	Ref.
ACE Eddie Awards	1996	Best Edited One-Hour Series for Television	Cindy Mollo (for "The Gas Man")	Nominated	
ALMA Awards	1998	Outstanding Individual Performance in a Television Series in a Crossover Role	Jon Seda	Nominated	
ALMA Awards	1999	Outstanding Individual Performance in a Television Series in a Crossover Role	Jon Seda	Nominated	
American Television Awards	1993	Best Dramatic Series	Homicide: Life on the Street	Nominated	
Artios Awards	1998	Best Casting for TV, Dramatic Episodic	Pat Moran	Nominated	
Artios Awards	1999	Best Casting for TV, Dramatic Episodic	Pat Moran	Nominated	
Directors Guild of America Awards	1994	Outstanding Directorial Achievement in Dramatic Series – Night	Barry Levinson (for "Gone for Goode")	Nominated	
Directors Guild of America Awards	1998	Outstanding Directorial Achievement in Dramatic Series – Night	Barbara Kopple (for "The Documentary")	Won	
Directors Guild of America Awards	1999	Outstanding Directorial Achievement in Dramatic Series – Night	Steve Buscemi (for "Finnegan's Wake")	Nominated	
Edgar Awards	2005	Special Edgar	Tom Fontana (Note: Shared with Oz and The Jury)	Honored	
GLAAD Media Awards	1999	Outstanding TV Drama Series	Homicide: Life on the Street	Nominated	
Humanitas Prize	1996	60 Minute	Tom Fontana, Henry Bromell, James Yoshimura (for "A Doll's Eyes")	Nominated	
Humanitas Prize	1998	60 Minute	Eric Overmyer (for "Mercy")	Nominated	
Humanitas Prize	1999	60 Minute	David Simon, Julie Martin, T.J. English (for "Shades of Gray")	Won	
NAACP Image Awards	1996	Outstanding Drama Series	Homicide: Life on the Street	Nominated	
NAACP Image Awards	1996	Outstanding Actor in a Drama Series	Andre Braugher	Nominated	
NAACP Image Awards	1996	Outstanding Actor in a Drama Series	Yaphet Kotto	Nominated	
NAACP Image Awards	1997	Outstanding Drama Series	Homicide: Life on the Street	Nominated	
NAACP Image Awards	1997	Outstanding Actor in a Drama Series	Andre Braugher	Nominated	
NAACP Image Awards	1997	Outstanding Actor in a Drama Series	Yaphet Kotto	Nominated	
NAACP Image Awards	1998	Outstanding Actor in a Drama Series	Andre Braugher	Nominated	
NAACP Image Awards	1998	Outstanding Actor in a Drama Series	Yaphet Kotto	Nominated	
NAACP Image Awards	1999	Outstanding Drama Series	Homicide: Life on the Street	Nominated	
NAACP Image Awards	1999	Outstanding Actor in a Drama Series	Andre Braugher	Nominated	
NAACP Image Awards	1999	Outstanding Actor in a Drama Series	Yaphet Kotto	Nominated	
NAACP Image Awards	1999	Outstanding Supporting Actor in a Drama Series	Clark Johnson	Nominated	
NAACP Image Awards	1999	Outstanding Supporting Actor in a Drama Series	Giancarlo Esposito	Nominated	
NAACP Image Awards	1999	Outstanding Supporting Actress in a Drama Series	Toni Lewis	Nominated	
NAACP Image Awards	2000	Outstanding Actress in a Drama Series	Michael Michele	Nominated	
Peabody Awards	1994	Honoree (Note: Presented to NBC and Baltimore Pictures in association with Reeves Entertainment)		Honored	
Peabody Awards	1996	Honoree (Note: Presented to NBC, Baltimore Pictures, Reeves Entertainment, SL/TMF Productions, in association with NBC Productions)		Honored	
Peabody Awards	1998	Honoree (Note: Presented to NBC and Fatima Productions)		Honored	
Primetime Emmy Awards	1993	Outstanding Individual Achievement in Directing in a Drama Series	Barry Levinson (for "Gone for Goode")	Won	
Primetime Emmy Awards	1993	Outstanding Individual Achievement in Writing in a Drama Series	Tom Fontana (for "Three Men and Adena")	Won	
Primetime Emmy Awards	1996	Outstanding Lead Actor in a Drama Series	Andre Braugher	Nominated	
Primetime Emmy Awards	1998	Outstanding Lead Actor in a Drama Series	Andre Braugher	Won	
Primetime Emmy Awards	1998	Outstanding Writing for a Drama Series	James Yoshimura (for "Subway")	Nominated	
Primetime Emmy Awards	1999	Outstanding Directing for a Drama Series	Ed Sherin (Note: Shared with Law & Order, where Sherin also directed the opening part of this crossover episode.) (for "Sideshow")	Nominated	
Primetime Emmy Awards	2000	Outstanding Writing for a Miniseries or Movie	Tom Fontana, Eric Overmyer, James Yoshimura (for Homicide: The Movie)	Nominated	
Primetime Creative Arts Emmy Awards	1993	Outstanding Guest Actress in a Drama Series	Gwen Verdon (for "A Ghost of a Chance")	Nominated	
Primetime Creative Arts Emmy Awards	1993	Outstanding Individual Achievement in Graphic Design and Title Sequences	Mark Pellington	Nominated	
Primetime Creative Arts Emmy Awards	1994	Outstanding Guest Actor in a Drama Series	Robin Williams (for "Bop Gun")	Nominated	
Primetime Creative Arts Emmy Awards	1996	Outstanding Guest Actress in a Drama Series	Lily Tomlin (for "The Hat")	Nominated	
Primetime Creative Arts Emmy Awards	1996	Outstanding Casting for a Series	Lou Digiaimo, Pat Moran, Brett Goldstein	Nominated	
Primetime Creative Arts Emmy Awards	1997	Outstanding Guest Actress in a Drama Series	Anne Meara (for "Hostage, Part 2")	Nominated	
Primetime Creative Arts Emmy Awards	1997	Outstanding Casting for a Series	Lou Digiaimo, Pat Moran, Brett Goldstein	Nominated	
Primetime Creative Arts Emmy Awards	1998	Outstanding Guest Actor in a Drama Series	Vincent D'Onofrio (for "Subway")	Nominated	
Primetime Creative Arts Emmy Awards	1998	Outstanding Guest Actor in a Drama Series	Charles Durning (for "Finnegan's Wake")	Nominated	
Primetime Creative Arts Emmy Awards	1998	Outstanding Guest Actress in a Drama Series	Alfre Woodard (for "Mercy")	Nominated	
Primetime Creative Arts Emmy Awards	1998	Outstanding Casting for a Series	Lou Digiaimo, Pat Moran, Brett Goldstein	Won	
PRISM Awards	1998	TV Drama Series Episode	"Deception" (Note: Received PRISM Certificate of Merit)	Nominated	
Producers Guild of America Awards	1997	Outstanding Producer of Episodic Television	Barry Levinson, Tom Fontana	Nominated	
Producers Guild of America Awards	1998	Outstanding Producer of Episodic Television	Barry Levinson, Tom Fontana, Jim Finnerty, Anya Epstein, David Simon, Julie Martin, James Yoshimura, Eric Overmyer, Gail Mutrux	Nominated	
Q Awards	1994	Best Quality Drama Series	Homicide: Life on the Street	Nominated	
Q Awards	1995	Founder's Award		Won	
Q Awards	1995	Best Quality Drama Series	Homicide: Life on the Street	Nominated	
Q Awards	1995	Best Actor in a Quality Drama Series	Andre Braugher	Won	
Q Awards	1996	Best Quality Drama Series	Homicide: Life on the Street	Won	
Q Awards	1996	Best Actress in a Quality Drama Series	Isabella Hoffman	Nominated	
Q Awards	1997	Best Quality Drama Series	Homicide: Life on the Street	Nominated	
Q Awards	1997	Best Actor in a Quality Drama Series	Andre Braugher	Nominated	
Q Awards	1997	Best Supporting Actor in a Quality Drama Series	Kyle Secor	Nominated	
Q Awards	1997	Best Supporting Actress in a Quality Drama Series	Michelle Forbes	Nominated	
Q Awards	1997	Best Recurring Player	Erik Dellums	Nominated	
Q Awards	1998	Best Quality Drama Series	Homicide: Life on the Street	Nominated	
Q Awards	1999	Best Quality Drama Series	Homicide: Life on the Street	Nominated	
Q Awards	1999	Best Supporting Actor in a Quality Drama Series	Kyle Secor	Nominated	
Satellite Awards	1997	Best Television Series, Drama	Homicide: Life on the Street	Nominated	
Satellite Awards	1997	Best Actor in a Series, Drama	Andre Braugher	Nominated	
Satellite Awards	1998	Best Television Series, Drama	Homicide: Life on the Street	Nominated	
TCA Awards	1993	Program of the Year	Homicide: Life on the Street	Nominated	
TCA Awards	1993	Outstanding Achievement in Drama	Homicide: Life on the Street	Nominated	
TCA Awards	1994	Outstanding Achievement in Drama	Homicide: Life on the Street	Nominated	
TCA Awards	1995	Program of the Year	Homicide: Life on the Street	Nominated	
TCA Awards	1995	Outstanding Achievement in Drama	Homicide: Life on the Street	Nominated	
TCA Awards	1996	Program of the Year	Homicide: Life on the Street	Won	
TCA Awards	1996	Outstanding Achievement in Drama	Homicide: Life on the Street	Won	
TCA Awards	1997	Program of the Year	Homicide: Life on the Street	Nominated	
TCA Awards	1997	Outstanding Achievement in Drama	Homicide: Life on the Street	Won	
TCA Awards	1997	Individual Achievement in Drama	Andre Braugher	Won	
TCA Awards	1998	Program of the Year	Homicide: Life on the Street	Nominated	
TCA Awards	1998	Outstanding Achievement in Drama	Homicide: Life on the Street	Won	
TCA Awards	1998	Individual Achievement in Drama	Andre Braugher	Won	
TCA Awards	1998	Individual Achievement in Drama	Kyle Secor	Nominated	
TCA Awards	1999	Outstanding Achievement in Drama	Homicide: Life on the Street	Nominated	
Writers Guild of America Awards	1994	Television: Episodic Drama	Paul Attanasio (for "Gone for Goode")	Nominated	
Writers Guild of America Awards	1994	Television: Episodic Drama	Tom Fontana, Frank Pugliese (for "Night of the Dead Living")	Won	
Writers Guild of America Awards	1995	Television: Episodic Drama	Tom Fontana, David Simon, David Mills (for "Bop Gun")	Won	
Writers Guild of America Awards	1995	Television: Episodic Drama	Tom Fontana, Noel Behn (for "A Many Splendored Thing")	Nominated	
Writers Guild of America Awards	1996	Television: Episodic Drama	Tom Fontana, Julie Martin, Bonnie Mark (for "Fits Like a Glove")	Nominated	
Writers Guild of America Awards	1999	Television: Episodic Drama	James Yoshimura (for "Subway")	Nominated	
Writers Guild of America Awards	1999	Television: Episodic Drama	Eric Overmyer (for "Saigon Rose")	Nominated	
Writers Guild of America Awards	1999	Television: Episodic Drama	James Yoshimura, David Simon, David Mills (for "Finnegan's Wake")	Nominated	
Young Artist Awards	1997	Best Performance in a Drama Series – Guest Starring Young Actor	Elijah Wood	Nominated	

== Home media ==
New Video (through A&E Home Video and NBC Home Entertainment) released all seven seasons of Homicide: Life on the Street on DVD in Region 1 between 2003 and 2005. The Television film Homicide: The Movie was released on DVD in Region 1 by Trimark Pictures on May 22, 2001. A&E Home Entertainment also released a complete series set in collectible 'file cabinet' packaging on November 14, 2006. The complete series was subsequently re-released in regular packaging on October 20, 2009. FremantleMedia handled distribution rights of all 7 seasons via International.

On April 5, 2017, it was announced that Shout! Factory had acquired the rights to the series in Region 1 and would re-release Homicide: Life on the Street - The Complete Series on DVD on July 4, 2017.

In Australia, Region 4, the releases were the same as the Region 2 release. These were distributed by Roadshow Entertainment. The Complete Series collection was distributed by Shock Entertainment and packaged as the Region 1 releases with Series 1 & 2 and Series 3 through to 7. Via Vision Entertainment obtained the rights to the series and released 'The Complete Series (Special Edition)' boxset in May 2021 in the same format of the shock releases.

On June 17, 2024, producer David Simon announced on Twitter that NBC have finally secured music rights, which will allow them to sell the show to a streaming service. On July 22, 2024, NBC announced the show and movie would be available on Peacock in 4K and it officially arrived the following month. As of March 2025, it is also available to stream on both Prime Video, iTunes and Tubi.

DVD Name	Episodes	Release dates		
DVD Name	Episodes	Region 1	Region 2	Region 4
The Complete Seasons 1&2	13	May 27, 2003	February 26, 2007 (Series 1)	June 30, 2009 (Series 1)
The Complete Season 3	20	October 28, 2003	July 16, 2007 (Series 2)	September 30, 2009 (Series 2)
The Complete Season 4	22	March 30, 2004	September 24, 2007 (Series 3)	December 2, 2009 (Series 3)
The Complete Season 5	22	September 28, 2004	February 4, 2008 (Series 4)	February 2, 2010 (Series 4)
The Complete Season 6	23	January 25, 2005	May 5, 2007 (Series 5)	May 5, 2011 (Series 5)
The Complete Season 7	22	June 28, 2005	June 2, 2007 (Series 6)	TBA (Series 6)
Homicide: The Movie	1	May 22, 2001	—N/a	—N/a
The Complete Series	122	November 14, 2006; July 4, 2017 (re-release)	March 29, 2010	October 3, 2012; May 19, 2021 (re-release)

== Spin-off series ==
The show inspired the spin-off Homicide: Second Shift, which was shown exclusively online and did not include the regular cast. It featured detectives of the homicide squad that worked the second shift, after the television detectives went home for the day.
