= Smoke Gets in Your Eyes (Homicide: Life on the Street) =

- Homicide: Life on the Street episode
- Munch shows a suspect the results of a fake lie-detector test conducted with a copy machine, which was based on a real-life trick used by the Baltimore Police Department.
- Episode no.: Season 1 Episode 8
- Directed by: Wayne Ewing
- Written by: James Yoshimura; Tom Fontana
- Cinematography by: Wayne Ewing
- Production code: 109
- Original air date: March 24, 1993

Guest appearances
- Sean Whitesell as Dr. Eli Devilbiss; Dan Moran as Mr. Howell; Steven Marcus as Det. Russ DeSilva; Joe Fersedi as Colin Dietz; Gerald F. Gough as Col. Burt Granger; Clayton LeBouef as Capt. George Barnfather; Walt MacPherson as a police officer; John Waters as a bartender; Sharon Ziman as Naomi

Episode chronology
← Previous "And the Rockets' Dead Glare"	Next → "Night of the Dead Living"
- List of Homicide: Life on the Street episodes

"Smoke Gets in Your Eyes" is the eighth episode of the first season of the American police drama television series Homicide: Life on the Street. It originally aired on NBC in the United States on March 24, 1993. In the episode, Howard and Bayliss attempt to quit smoking, Gee discovers secret asbestos removal in the squad room, and Munch and Bolander investigate the beating death of a 14-year-old boy. The episode was written by James Yoshimura and Tom Fontana, and was directed by Wayne Ewing, who doubled as director of photography.

The episode featured a cameo appearance by film director and Baltimore native John Waters as a bartender. "Smoke Gets in Your Eyes" was originally supposed to be the first season finale, but the episode "Night of the Dead Living" was moved to the end of the season because NBC programmers felt it was too slow-paced to show any earlier in the season. During one scene, Munch and Bolander convince a suspect the copy machine is a dangerous lie-detector machine. This was inspired by a real-life trick used by the Baltimore Police Department and documented in David Simon's 1991 non-fiction book Homicide: A Year on the Killing Streets, on which the series was based. It was later used in an episode of Simon's police drama series, The Wire.

Since ratings for Homicide had gradually declined throughout the season, NBC announced a decision about whether the series would be renewed would depend on the Nielsen ratings of the final four episodes, including "Smoke Gets in Your Eyes". Nevertheless, it was seen by 7.08 million household viewers, which was considered relatively low, although it was an improvement over the previous episode "And the Rockets' Dead Glare".

== Plot summary ==
Howard (Melissa Leo) quits smoking, and her partner Felton (Daniel Baldwin) fears her subsequent edginess will endanger his safety. Bayliss (Kyle Secor) also tries to quit smoking but tries to live vicariously through his smoking partner Pembleton (Andre Braugher). Howard and Bayliss petition Gee (Yaphet Kotto) to set up a non-smoking section for the squad room, but an amused Gee refuses because most of the detectives smoke.

Howard, Felton, Bayliss and Pembleton find they share a common suspect in a Union Square murder, and plan a joint stakeout. Howard and Bayliss decide to ride together so Pembleton and Felton can smoke in the car. Although outwardly critical and skeptical, Pembleton and Felton are actually impressed with their partners' willpower and discuss the merits of quitting smoking. Howard and Bayliss, however, talk about nothing but smoking, prompting Bayliss to walk to Pembleton's car window and ask for a cigarette. As the result, the four detectives almost miss the suspect, and have to engage him in a foot chase to arrest him.

Meanwhile, an intrusive public works inspector (Carter Jahncke) tests the air quality at the squad room but insists to an inquisitive Gee that everything is fine. The next day, however, Gee goes upstairs and finds a team wearing protective respirator suits removing asbestos from the wall. Gee angrily confronts Captain Barnfather (Clayton LeBouef) and Colonel Granger (Gerald F. Gough) for not informing the detectives about the work, and demands it be stopped until precautionary medical checks can be conducted. Barnfather and Granger insist the removal work is safe but give in when Gee threatens to go to the media. Meanwhile, Lewis (Clark Johnson) brags repeatedly to Crosetti (Jon Polito) about his new Ford FE V8 engine and the car he plans to build. Crosetti feigns disinterest, but the next day presents Lewis with a rear-view mirror as a gift.

Munch (Richard Belzer) and Bolander (Ned Beatty) investigate the death of a 14-year-old boy found dead in a hospital waiting room. The victim, Percy Howell, appeared to suffer sustained blows to the head from a blunt object but waited days before seeking treatment. Although initially suspicious of the boy's cold and uncaring father (Dan Moran), the detectives eventually question another teen (Gavin Goren) who spent time with Howell right before he died. After convincing the gullible teen that the copy machine was actually an "electrolyte neutron magnetic scanner" that could detect lies, they learn Howell was killed by Colin Dietz (Joe Fersedi), the teenage leader of a gang called the Zaps, with a baseball bat. Munch and Bolander arrest Dietz, who says he loved Howell like a brother and the beating was an initiation. Bolander is deeply disturbed by Dietz's cold casualness in discussing the murder. Later, Bolander talks to a bartender (John Waters) about his divorce, and the episode ends with Bolander drinking alone at the bar, quietly singing an Elvis Presley song.

== Production ==
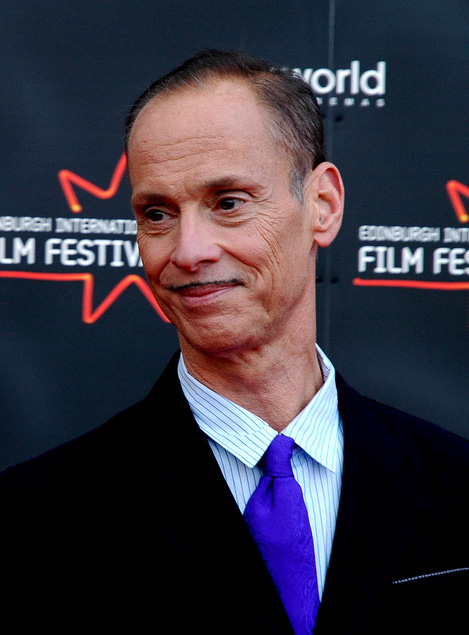
Film director and Baltimore native John Waters made his first of two Homicide cameos in "Smoke Gets in Your Eyes".

"Smoke Gets in Your Eyes" was written by James Yoshimura based on a story by executive producer Tom Fontana, and was directed by Wayne Ewing, who doubled as director of photography. The title of the episode refers both to Bayliss and Howard seeking to quit smoking, and to the hazardous asbestos being removed from the squad room. The episode includes a cameo appearance by film director John Waters, who plays a bartender speaking with Bolander in the final scene. Waters, a Baltimore native who develops and sets most of his films in the city, would make another guest appearance in the third season episode, "Law & Disorder" in a different cameo role.

"Smoke Gets in Your Eyes" was originally supposed to be the Homicide: Life on the Street first season finale, but the episode "Night of the Dead Living" was moved to the end of the season. Although originally scheduled as the third episode, NBC programmers were worried "Night of the Dead Living", which takes place entirely within the detective's squad room, was too slow-paced for a series still trying to win viewers. Although Homicide producers felt "Smoke Gets in Your Eyes" had a sense of resolving storylines, NBC executives believed it was too somber and preferred the ending of "Night of the Dead Living", which ends with the detectives happily smiling and laughing.

During one scene in "Smoke Gets in Your Eyes", Munch and Bolander force a suspect to take an "electrolyte neutron magnetic scan test", which involved placing his hand on a copy machine and photocopying his hand as they asked him questions. Prior to giving the exam, the detectives loaded papers with the words "True" and "False" into the machine, so when the final copies came out it appeared the machine was giving answers to the questions. The detectives pretended the test was radioactive and dangerous to further make the suspect nervous. This scene was based on a real-life trick used by Baltimore Police Department detectives in 1988. The real-life instance was featured in Homicide: A Year on the Killing Streets, the 1991 David Simon non-fiction book about a Baltimore Police Department, which was adapted into the Homicide series. This hoax was also used in "More with Less", the fifth season premiere episode of David Simon's later police drama series, The Wire.

== Reception ==
Ratings for Homicide: Life on the Street gradually declined since the series first premiered. In response, NBC announced to fans that a decision about whether Homicide would be renewed or canceled would depend on how the last four episodes of the season fared in the ratings, including "Smoke Gets in Your Eyes". In its original American broadcast on March 24, 1993, the episode was watched by 7.08 million households, according to Nielsen Media Research, earning the episode a 7.6 rating. This constituted a slight increase in viewership compared to the previous week's episode, "And the Rockets' Dead Glare", which was seen by 6.61 million viewers and received a 7.1 rating. Homicide ranked low in the Nielsen ratings compared to other shows the week of "Smoke Gets in Your Eyes", ranking 77th for the week of March 15 to 21, with the CBS news magazine series 60 Minutes ranking number one with 21.9 million household viewers.

== Home media ==
"Smoke Gets in Your Eyes" and the rest of the first and second season episodes were included in the four-DVD box-set "Homicide: Life on the Street: The Complete Seasons 1 & 2", which was released by A&E Home Video on May 27, 2003.
