= A Dog and Pony Show (Homicide: Life on the Street) =

- Homicide: Life on the Street episode
- Pembleton investigates the murder of police dog Jake
- Episode no.: Season 1 Episode 6
- Directed by: Alan Taylor
- Story by: Tom Fontana
- Teleplay by: James Yoshimura
- Cinematography by: Wayne Ewing
- Production code: 107
- Original air date: March 10, 1993

Guest appearances
- Wendy Hughes as Dr. Carol Blythe; Michael Constantine as Jim Scinta; Lee Tergesen as Off. Chris Thormann; Edie Falco as Eva Thormann; Stivi Paskoski as Danny Blythe; LisaGay Hamilton as Latoya Kennedy; Mel Proctor as Grant Besser

Episode chronology
← Previous "Three Men and Adena"	Next → "And the Rockets' Dead Glare"
- List of Homicide: Life on the Street episodes

"A Dog and Pony Show" is the sixth episode of the first season of the American police drama television series Homicide: Life on the Street. It originally aired on NBC in the United States on March 10, 1993. In the episode, Pembleton and Bayliss investigate the murder of a police dog, Crosetti helps his friend adjust after a serious injury, and Felton and Howard suspect a drug dealer for a brutal murder.

The episode was written James Yoshimura based on a story by executive producer Tom Fontana, and was directed by Alan Taylor, who Homicide executive director Barry Levinson chose after being impressed by Taylor's short film That Burning Question (1988). Elements of the episode, including the shooting of patrolman Chris Thormann, were adapted from David Simon's non-fiction crime book, Homicide: A Year on the Killing Streets. "A Dog and Pony Show" included guest appearances by actors Michael Constantine, Larry Gilliard, Jr., LisaGay Hamilton and Edie Falco.

Since ratings for Homicide had gradually declined throughout the season, NBC announced a decision about whether the series would be renewed would depend on the Nielsen ratings of the final four episodes, starting with "A Dog and Pony Show". Before it aired, Barry Levinson appeared in a commercial making a direct appeal to viewers to watch. Nevertheless, it was seen by 8.47 million household viewers, which was considered relatively low, although it was an improvement over the previous episode "Three Men and Adena".

== Plot summary ==
Bayliss (Kyle Secor) continues to despair over the Adena Watson case, which he has failed to solve. When Gee (Yaphet Kotto) orders Bayliss and Pembleton to move on and take new cases, they are assigned to solve the murder of Jake, a police dog. Bayliss thinks it is a waste of time, but according to municipal law, the death of a city-owned animal is treated as an official investigation and Pembleton decides to take the case seriously. The dog's gums are extremely red, leading Pembleton to believe he may have been poisoned or gassed. They question local dog pound employee Penny (Joy Ehrlich), who admits she accidentally killed Jake with carbon monoxide after mixing him up with another dog, then dumped the body in a panic. John Kuehn (Nick Olcott), Jake's human "partner", scatters Jake's ashes in a lake and Bayliss, reminded of Watson, reacts emotionally.

Felton (Daniel Baldwin) and Howard (Melissa Leo) respond to the murder of a young woman named Idamae Keene, who is found cut and tortured to death in a bedroom. They determine the victim likely knew her killer, and the next day they question "Pony" Johnson (Geoffrey Ewing), a drug dealer who was having an affair with Keene. Johnson denies killing Keene, but his other girlfriend (LisaGay Hamilton) tells the detectives Johnson abruptly left a party with fellow dealer William Lyness (Larry Gilliard, Jr.) on the night of the murder. Later, Lewis (Clark Johnson) reports Lyness's mother was killed the same way as Keene. Felton, Howard and Lewis interrogate Lyness, who confesses he sat in the car while Johnson killed his mother for stealing drugs from Lyness.

Blythe (Wendy Hughes) leaves her visiting son Danny (Stivi Paskoski) with her boyfriend Bolander (Ned Beatty) for the day, with the hopes they will get to know each other better. Danny rides along with Bolander and Munch (Richard Belzer) on their murder investigations but misbehaves and asks inappropriate questions. At dinner, Danny asks Bolander about his sex life with his mother, making Bolander extremely uncomfortable. Bolander later tells Blythe he believes her son is crazy. Meanwhile, Crosetti (Jon Polito) spends a lot of time with Officer Thormann (Lee Tergesen), who is recovering from his recent shooting. At one point, a humiliated Thormann defecates on himself, but Crosetti helps him clean up. Thormann's wife, Eva (Edie Falco), tells Crosetti she is pregnant, but that her husband reacted angrily to the news. Thormann tells Crosetti he should have died at the hospital and can never be a good father, but Crosetti encourages him.

Gee attends a retirement party for his best friend and fellow shift commander, Lieutenant John Scinta (Michael Constantine). Police brass keep Scinta's possible replacement a secret from Gee. After returning drunk from the party, the two reminisce about old times, but Scinta also warns Gee that the brass could end up forcing him into retirement, just as they did to Scinta.

== Production ==
"A Dog and Pony Show" was written by James Yoshimura based on a story by executive producer Tom Fontana, and was directed by Alan Taylor. Barry Levinson, executive producer of Homicide: Life on the Street, hand-picked Taylor to direct the episode after watching Taylor's 1988 half-hour film, That Burning Question, which Taylor made as a thesis for a seminar taught by film director Martin Scorsese. The episode establishes the vacancy of the homicide unit's second shift commander position, which is offered to Pembleton in the first season episode, "And the Rockets Dead Glare", before it is ultimately given to Megan Russert in the beginning of the third season. Taylor said of directing Homicide, "I hadn't even learned the rules of filmmaking, or TV for that matter, and I was being put in a position where I was supposed to break them all."

The shooting of Officer Thormann was adapted from true-life events in chronicled in Homicide: A Year on the Killing Streets, the 1991 David Simon non-fiction book about a Baltimore Police Department, which was adapted into the Homicide series. Homicide writers added the twist of Crosetti taking the case personally based on his close friendship with the victim. As the first season of Homicide progressed, NBC officials complained to the show's producers about the large number of protracted, interwoven subplots going on during each given episode. "A Dog and Pony Show" in particular refers to the Adena Watson murder, which was featured in five previous episodes and resolved in "Three Men and Adena", as well as the romance between Bolander and Blythe, which had been progressing throughout the first season. Additionally, the "Pony" Johnson subplot started in "A Dog and Pony Show" would not become resolved until the next episode, "And the Rockets Dead Glare." By the beginning of the second season, the Homicide producers bowed to network pressure and were forced to reduce the number of subplots in each episode.

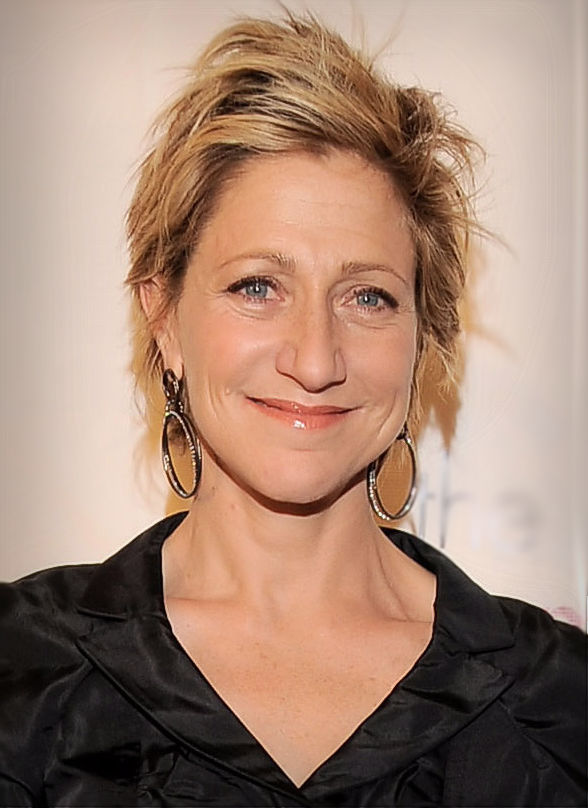
Edie Falco made a guest appearance in "A Dog and Pony Show".

"A Dog and Pony Show" included guest appearances by actors Michael Constantine, Larry Gilliard, Jr., LisaGay Hamilton and Edie Falco. Tom Fontana cast Falco as Officer Thormann's wife Eva after watching her performance in Laws of Gravity. Fontana said of her, "She's an actress who's unadorned by any embroidery. She does everything with such simplicity and honesty, it's breathtaking." Falco was a struggling actor at the time, and said her salary from one Homicide episode paid for one month's worth of rent. Fontana cast Falco as a regular in his HBO series Oz based on her work in the Homicide episodes. Larry Gilliard, Jr. later starred in a leading role as drug dealer D'Angelo Barksdale in The Wire, another Baltimore police drama created by Homicide producer and writer David Simon. LisaGay Hamilton later starred in the legal drama The Practice, making her the second future Practice star to appear on Homicide, after Steve Harris in "Gone for Goode". Hamilton also later starred in the 2009 comedy-drama series Men of a Certain Age as the on-screen wife of a character played by Homicide co-star, Andre Braugher.

== Reception ==
=== Ratings ===
Ratings for Homicide: Life on the Street gradually declined since the series first premiered. In response, NBC announced to fans that a decision about whether Homicide would be renewed or canceled would depend on how the last four episodes of the season fared in the ratings, starting with "A Dog and Pony Show". The week before the episode aired, the network started airing a television commercial with Barry Levinson making a direct appeal to viewers to watch the show, in which he said:

If you're wondering when we're on, remember the Michael Jackson special? We were opposite that. And when the president spoke? Pre-empted for it. And the Grammys? You got it - we were opposite that. So where are we, exactly? Well there's a show called Home Improvement - and as soon as you get there, then quickly switch to NBC.

In its original American broadcast on March 10, 1993, "A Dog and Pony Show" was watched by 8.47 million households, according to Nielsen Media Research, earning the episode a 9.1 rating. This constituted an increase in viewership compared to the previous week's episode, "Three Men and Adena", which was seen by 7.08 million household viewers and received a 7.6 rating. Nevertheless, Homicide ranked relatively low in the Nielsen ratings compared to other shows, ranking 67th for the week of March 8 to 14, with the ABC comedy series Home Improvement ranking number one with 22.6 million household viewers.

=== Reviews ===
The Scripps Howard News Service praised the episode, calling it one of their strongest television recommendations for the week and declaring Homicide "the best new drama of the season".

== Home media ==
"A Dog and Pony Show" and the rest of the first and second-season episodes were included in the four-DVD box-set "Homicide: Life on the Street: The Complete Seasons 1 & 2", which was released by A&E Home Video on May 27, 2003, for $69.95.
