= Night of the Dead Living =

- Homicide: Life on the Street episode
- Gee complains about the broken air conditioners
- Episode no.: Season 1 Episode 9
- Directed by: Michael Lehmann
- Story by: Frank Pugliese; Tom Fontana
- Teleplay by: Frank Pugliese
- Cinematography by: Wayne Ewing
- Production code: 103
- Original air date: March 31, 1993

Guest appearances
- Lee Tergesen as Off. Chris Thormann; N'Bushe Wright as Loretta Kenyatta; Kenny Blank as James Hill; Denise Morgan as Bessie Morris; Cleve Wall as the man dressed as Santa Claus; Sharon Ziman as Naomi

Episode chronology
← Previous "Smoke Gets in Your Eyes"	Next → "Bop Gun"
- List of Homicide: Life on the Street episodes

"Night of the Dead Living" is the ninth episode and first season finale of the American police drama television series Homicide: Life on the Street. It originally aired on NBC in the United States on March 31, 1993. In the episode, the homicide squad works the night shift on a summer evening, but no calls come in, leaving the detectives to brood over their personal matters. The teleplay was written by Frank Pugliese based on a story he wrote along with executive producer Tom Fontana. It was directed by Michael Lehmann.

"Night of the Dead Living" was originally intended to be the third episode of the season, but NBC programmers moved it to the end of the season because they felt its slow pace and lack of traditional action was inappropriate early in the series, when the show was trying to woo viewers. The broadcast schedule change led to some consistency and time-line errors, which Homicide producers addressed by adding the words "One hot night, last September..." to the beginning of the episode. Actress N'Bushe Wright makes a guest appearance as a cleaning woman who loses her baby in the police station.

Since ratings for Homicide had gradually declined throughout the season, NBC announced a decision about whether the series would be renewed would depend on the Nielsen ratings of the final four episodes, including "Night of the Dead Living". Nevertheless, it was seen by 6.7 million household viewers, marking one of the lowest viewerships of the season. It received generally positive reviews upon its original broadcast, although some mainstream television audiences were turned off by its minimalist approach. It marked the last original episode of Homicide for nine months until the second season premiere, "Bop Gun". The episode's teleplay won a Writers Guild of America Award for Outstanding Achievement in Television Writing for Episodic Drama.

== Plot summary ==
One by one, the detectives arrive for the night shift on an unusually hot September evening. A furious Gee (Yaphet Kotto) calls maintenance to complain about the non-working air conditioner and learns it has been shut off for the night. Felton (Daniel Baldwin) and Lewis (Clark Johnson) try to find out who secretly lights a candle in the squad room every night; they blow it out a number of times, but it always ends up lit again without anyone noticing. Munch (Richard Belzer) loudly complains about a romantic breakup. While the other detectives complain about the heat, Pembleton (Andre Braugher) remains calm and comfortable. Bayliss (Kyle Secor), who acts uncooperative with Pembleton, says he has found the fingerprints of a man named James Hill, who he believes is the killer in the Adena Watson case. Officer Thormann (Lee Tergesen) brings in Hill, who turns out to be a 12-year-old boy (Kenny Blank), much to the amusement of the other detectives.

The detectives are shocked at the lack of homicide-related calls they are receiving throughout the night. Bolander (Ned Beatty) tries several times to call Blythe (Wendy Hughes) and ask her out on a date, but he cannot build up the courage. With encouragement from Howard (Melissa Leo), he finally does so and is shocked when she accepts. Crosetti (Jon Polito) gets agitated when his daughter calls and wants her boyfriend to sleep over. Gee comforts Crosetti and lets him go home to take care of her. Gee finds a baby boy in a small animal carrier-like cage on the bottom floor of the police station. The detectives take care of the baby while they wait for social services to arrive. After a social worker takes the baby, the cleaning lady Loretta Kenyatta (N'Bushe Wright) hysterically screams somebody kidnapped her baby. The detectives get the baby back for her while Bayliss, infatuated with Loretta, listens to her talk about her life.

Howard gets a call from her sister, who has recently found a tumor on her breast. The sister has just learned her husband has been having an affair. Although Howard is initially hesitant to confide in Felton, he eventually surprises her by offering genuine words of comfort. A drunken man dressed as Santa Claus (Cleve Wall) is arrested for threatening his wife and a crowd of people with a water pistol. Later, the detectives get a call that "Santa Claus" has escaped from custody, and he is found after falling through the ceiling and landing on Munch's desk. Meanwhile, Pembleton and Bayliss discuss the Watson case. Bayliss insists he has already gone over the information repeatedly, but Pembleton tells him he needs to think outside the box and approach it with from the mind-frame of a criminal. Later, Bayliss reexamines the information and realizes the killer brought Watson down a fire escape, offering a new lead in the case. As the new day dawns, Gee has the detectives assemble on the roof so he can spray them with a garden hose to cool them off.

The episode ends with Munch revealing to Thormann that he lights the candle each night "for all the ones who have been killed," while Thormann admits that he re-lit it in Munch's absence because he knew it meant something to him.

== Production ==
"Night of the Dead Living" was directed by Michael Lehmann. The teleplay was written by Frank Pugliese based on a story he wrote along with executive director Tom Fontana. It was originally intended to be the third episode of the first season, but NBC programmers felt it was too slow-paced to run so early in the season. The episode takes place entirely within the squad room and lacks the traditional action of a typical police series, which NBC executives felt was not appropriate for an early stage when the series was still trying to woo viewers. The programmers also preferred to end the series on the upbeat note of the final scenes in "Night of the Dead Living", which includes the detectives happily smiling and laughing on the roof of the police department building as Gee sprays them with a hose to relieve the summer heat. In contrast, the originally-planned season finale, "Smoke Gets in Your Eyes", which Homicide producers felt had a sense of resolving season storylines, was a somber episode which ended with a sad image of Bolander quietly singing to himself at a bar over a beer.

Running the episode out of sequence produced several notable continuity errors. For example, Bayliss and Pembleton are still working on the Adena Watson murder, which they had stopped investigating in the earlier episode "Three Men and Adena". Additionally, Officer Thormann is seen onscreen working and healthy, although he was blinded in the earlier episode "Son of a Gun" as a result of a gunshot wound to the head that forced him to leave the police department. These consistency errors were addressed by Homicide producers by adding the words "One hot night, last September..." to the beginning of the episode, thus establishing the events of the episode took place within the correct timeline of the series, even though the episodes are shown out of order.

The Watson case depicted in the episode was based on the real-life 1988 Baltimore slaying of Latonya Kim Wallace, which is chronicled in Homicide: A Year on the Killing Streets, the 1991 David Simon non-fiction book about a Baltimore Police Department, which was adapted into the Homicide series.

During "Night of the Dead Living", Crosetti displays an overriding concern for the safety and welfare of his daughter Beatrice. After Crosetti was revealed to have killed himself in the third season episode "Crosetti", many viewers claimed suicide was unrealistic for his character based on his feelings about his daughter displayed in this episode. Beatrice is referred to only by name in "Night of the Dead Living", and would not appear onscreen until she grieved over her father's death in "Crosetti".

While discussing the mysterious candle with Lewis in the episode, Felton said he generally solves cases with physical evidence, witnesses and confessions, not by investigating motives. This insight into detective work is consistent with the conclusions Simon drew in Homicide: A Year on the Killing Streets, and reviewers have praised Homicide for its realism in portraying detective work from this perspective, which is in stark contrast to other typical police dramas.

N'Bushe Wright, best known to this point for playing the student activist Claudia Bishop in the NBC drama series I'll Fly Away, made a guest appearance in "Night of the Dead Living" as the cleaning woman Loretta Kenyatta. Wright was cast in the role based on her performance in Zebrahead (1992), a drama film about an interracial romance.

A number of songs play on radios in the squad room throughout "Night of the Dead Living". Among the music featured in the episode were the songs "Lay Down My Life" by Carole King, "Texas Slide" by Jean-Jacques Milteau, "N.Y.C (Can You Believe This City?)" by Charles & Eddie, "Little Boy Blues" and "Break Up" by Gary Fitzgerald, and "Tropic Call" by Mitchell Coodley and Andrew Snitzer.

== Ratings ==
Ratings for Homicide: Life on the Street gradually declined since the series first premiered. In response, NBC announced to fans that a decision about whether Homicide would be renewed or canceled would depend on how the last four episodes of the season fared in the ratings, including "Smoke Gets in Your Eyes". In its original American broadcast on March 31, 1993, the episode was watched by 6.7 million households, according to Nielsen Media Research, earning the episode a 7.2 rating. It was one of the lowest ratings of the first season of Homicide: Life on the Street, continuing the downward trend of the season. By comparison, the previous episode, "Smoke Gets in Your Eyes", was seen by 7.08 million households, while the season premiere, "Gone for Goode", was watched by more than 18 million households due to a lead-in from Super Bowl XXVII. Homicide ranked low in the Nielsen ratings compared to other shows the week of "Night of the Dead Living", while its time-slot competitor, the ABC comedy Home Improvement, ranked second for the week with 20.39 million household viewers.

At the time that the season finale aired, Homicide producers still did not know whether their show would be renewed for a second season. After the season finale, Homicide: Life on the Street went on a hiatus while the network decided whether the series would be renewed. That hiatus ultimately lasted nine months until the premiere of the first episode of the second season, "Bop Gun".

== Reception ==
This hour, which plays out like a theater piece, proves that it's great writing and great acting, not car chases and whodunit twists, that make truly compelling TV.

— Neal Justin
Star Tribune

The episode received generally positive reviews from commentators, although David P. Kalat, author of Homicide: Life on the Street: The Unofficial Companion, said mainstream television audiences were "somewhat turned off by the minimalist approach". USA Today writer Matt Roush gave the episode four out of four stars, comparing it to David Mamet's Glengarry Glen Ross and calling it "minimalist drama (with) maximum impact". Roush wrote, "Imagine a crime show during which no crime occurs. Next to nothing happens. Yet every second counts." Lon Grahnke of the Chicago Sun-Times also gave it four out of four stars. He wrote, "If Life on the Street winds up dead after tonight's episode – the victim of low Nielsen ratings – at least the nine superb actors in the squad will know they made a grand exit."

The Salt Lake Tribune writer Harold Schindler praised the episode, particularly the "excellent writing, great acting [and] super atmosphere". Rocky Mountain News writer Dusty Saunders called the series "superb" and described Night of the Dead Living as "fascinating character studies of police officers in the squad room". In a 2007 article, Star Tribune writer Neal Justin included "Night of the Dead Living" in a list of 10 excellent network television episodes dating back 40 years. Justin said the episode proved it was not acting that made for good television, but rather strong writing and acting. Not all reviews were positive. John J. O'Connor of The New York Times praised the series in general, but said the various overlapping subplots in "Night of the Dead Living" – like the Santa Claus suspect, the pre-teen murder suspect and the cleaning woman's missing baby – felt like gratuitous "oddball routines". O'Connor added, "Too much cleverness can be grating."

Frank Pugliese and Tom Fontana won a Writers Guild of America award for Outstanding Achievement in Television Writing for Episodic Drama for the "Night of the Dead Living" teleplay. The script competed in that category against another Homicide episode, the first season premiere "Gone for Goode". The "Night of the Dead Living" teleplay also defeated scripts for the shows I'll Fly Away, Life Goes On, Picket Fences, TriBeCa and Reasonable Doubts.

== Home media ==
The first and second season episodes were included in the four-DVD box-set "Homicide: Life on the Street: The Complete Seasons 1 & 2", which was released by A&E Home Video on May 27, 2003. The DVD places "Night of the Dead Living" in its correct chronological order within the season, restoring all storylines and character developments.
