= And the Rockets' Dead Glare =

- Homicide: Life on the Street episode
- Episode no.: Season 1 Episode 7
- Directed by: Peter Markle
- Story by: Tom Fontana
- Teleplay by: Jorge Zamacona
- Cinematography by: Wayne Ewing
- Production code: 108
- Original air date: March 17, 1993

Guest appearances
- Željko Ivanek as ASA Ed Danvers; Ed Lauter as Agent Gruszynski; Bai Ling as Lin Chang; Alvin Lum as Mr. Dengshu; Steven Marcus as Det. Russ DeSilva; Michael Willis as Darin Russom; Ami Brabson as Mary Pembleton; Gerald F. Gough as Col. Burt Granger; Clayton LeBouef as Capt. George Barnfather; Ralph Tabakin as Dr. Scheiner

Episode chronology
← Previous "A Dog and Pony Show"	Next → "Smoke Gets in Your Eyes"
- List of Homicide: Life on the Street episodes

"And the Rockets' Dead Glare" is the seventh episode of the first season of the American police drama television series Homicide: Life on the Street. It originally aired on NBC in the United States on March 17, 1993. In the episode, Howard testifies in a murder trial, Pembleton is offered a promotion, and Lewis and Crosetti go to the Chinese Embassy in Washington, D.C. to investigate a political refugee's murder.

The teleplay was written by Jorge Zamacona based on a story by executive producer Tom Fontana, and the episode was directed by Peter Markle. It marked the first appearances of two recurring characters: defense attorney Darin Russom (Michael Willis) and Detective Frank Pembleton's wife Mary, who was played by actor Andre Braugher's real-life wife Ami Brabson. The episode also featured a guest performance by actress and future model Bai Ling.

The murder trial portrayed in the episode is based on a trial featured in David Simon's 1991 non-fiction book, Homicide: A Year on the Killing Streets, on which the series was based. Howard's procedural missteps, and her subsequent recovery, was based on that real-life trial. The writers sought to realistically portray the trial scenes by focusing on less dramatic courtroom elements. Some of the detectives in "And the Rockets' Dead Glare" make arguments for drug liberalization, particularly John Munch, whose arguments were inspired by actor Richard Belzer's real-life personal history with drug abuse.

Since ratings for Homicide had gradually declined throughout the season, NBC announced a decision about whether the series would be renewed would depend on the Nielsen ratings of the final four episodes, including "And the Rockets' Dead Glare". Nevertheless, it was seen by a relatively low 6.61 million household viewers, a decline from the previous week's "A Dog and Pony Show".

== Plot summary ==
Lewis (Clark Johnson) and Crosetti investigate the execution-style shooting death of a Chinese college student. A friend in his dormitory (Bai Ling) says the victim was a student leader at the 1989 Tiananmen Square protest and had been hunted ever since. The detectives go to Washington, D.C. to talk to staff at the Chinese embassy about the murder, but they deny any knowledge of the incident. Secret Service agent Gruszynski (Ed Lauter) confronts Lewis and Crosetti and tells them not to waste the embassy's time but agrees to give the detectives a tour of Washington before they go. Crosetti is excited to see the landmarks but Lewis, who believes Gruszynski knows who committed the murder, remains confrontational. When Gruszynski still refuses to help, Crosetti and a frustrated Lewis leave Washington.

Felton (Daniel Baldwin) and Howard (Melissa Leo) prepare to testify in the murder trial of "Pony" Johnson (Geoffrey C. Ewing). State prosecutor Danvers (Željko Ivanek) tells an anxious Howard that the case depends entirely on her testimony. Felton, who in contrast to Howard is very relaxed, claims Howard is in love with Danvers, which she vehemently denies. Howard testifies but nervously fumbles facts and allows defense attorney Darin Russom (Michael Willis) to create reasonable doubt to the jury. After receiving reassurance from Danvers, however, Howard is recalled and performs much better, seriously damaging Russom's case. Johnson is found guilty of murder and Danvers offers to buy Howard dinner, which she accepts much to Felton's amusement.

Munch (Richard Belzer) and Bolander (Ned Beatty) respond to a body found in the woods, next to a van full of low-quality marijuana. Munch proves to be an expert on hemp and discusses how the plant was grown by founding fathers Thomas Jefferson and George Washington. The detectives eventually identify the victim as a middleman for a drug dealer, and Bolander finds a neighbor who saw the dealer holding a gun to the victim's head the night before the murder. Munch, Bayliss (Kyle Secor) and narcotics detective Russ DeSilva (Steven Marcus) debate whether drugs should be illegal; the homicide detectives claim legalization would reduce violent crime and that drug revenue could go to good causes. Bolander asks Munch if he smokes pot, but he refuses to answer. That night, Munch and Bolander arrest the drug dealer at home.

Captain Barnfather (Clayton LeBouef) and Colonel Granger (Gerald F. Gough) offer Pembleton (Andre Braugher) a promotion to lieutenant and the vacant shift commander position working alongside Gee (Yaphet Kotto). Pembleton asks for time to consider it, and the duo ask him not to mention the offer to Gee. Gee is inquisitive and immediately senses Pembleton is lying when he says the discussion was nothing. After discussing the offer with his wife Mary (Ami Brabson), Pembleton decides not to take the job and confesses to Gee, who has already learned the truth and is disappointed Pembleton did not tell him sooner. The episode ends with Pembleton going to the bar with his fellow detectives, which he seldom does.

== Production ==
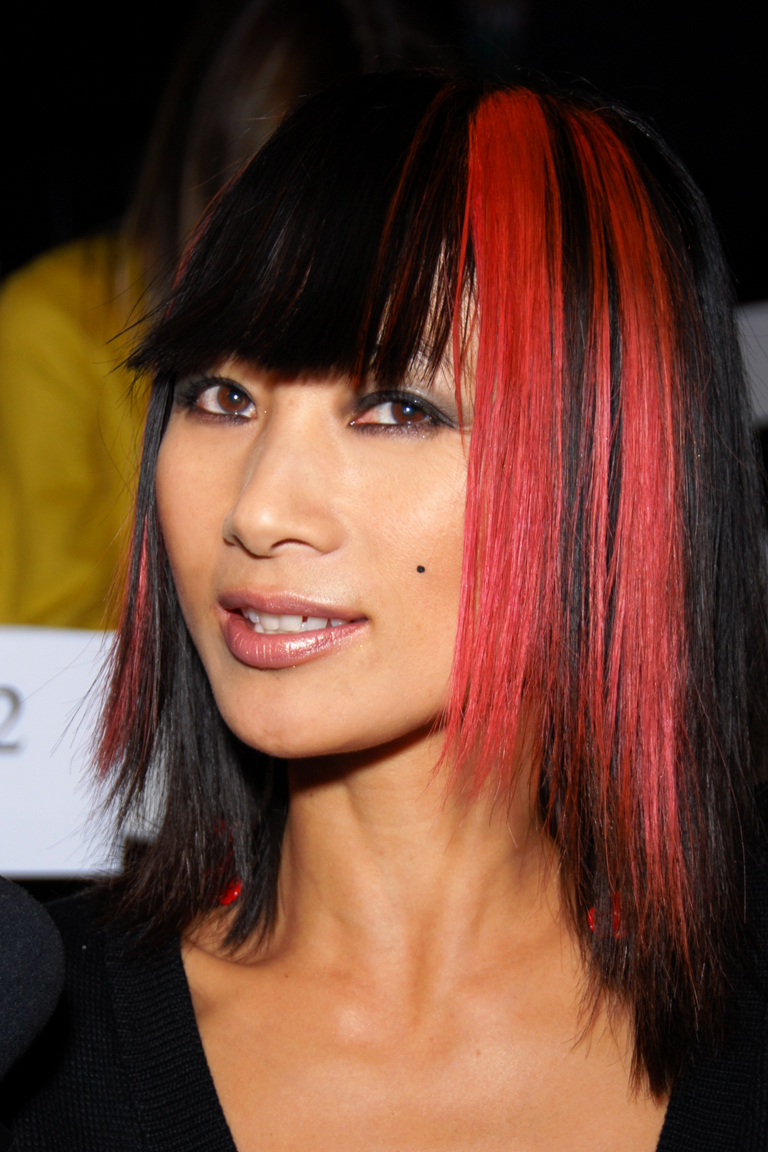
Bai Ling, who later achieved fame as an actress and model, made a guest appearance in "And the Rockets' Dead Glare".

"And the Rockets Dead Glare" was written by Jorge Zamacona based on a story by executive producer Tom Fontana, and was directed by Peter Markle. It marked the first appearances of defense attorney Darin Russom (Michael Willis) and Frank Pembleton's wife Mary, both of whom became recurring characters throughout the rest of the series. Mary Pembleton is played by Ami Brabson, who is married to actor Andre Braugher in real life. Brabson auditioned for the role shortly after Braugher was cast in the series, and Braugher said of their on-screen pairing, "We have an instant rapport that we don't have to create." Willis, in real life, has a low opinion of trial lawyers, and did little to research for his role as Russom. "And the Rockets' Dead Glare" also featured a guest appearance by actress and model Bai Ling, a student and apparent friend to the Chinese refugee murdered in the episode. Although relatively unknown at the time, Ling went on to star in such films as Red Corner (1997) and Anna and the King (1999), and was named one of People Magazine's "50 Most Beautiful People in the World" in 1998.

The "Pony" Johnson murder trial is based on a real-life trial featured in Homicide: A Year on the Killing Streets, the 1991 David Simon non-fiction book about a Baltimore Police Department, which was adapted into the Homicide series. In that real-life trial, a Baltimore detective misspeaks during his testimony and nearly jeopardizes the outcome of the case. This is mirrored by the actions of Kay Howard, who accidentally says the victim was dead at least 24 hours when she meant to say 12 hours, leaving an opening for defense attorney Darin Russom to question her recollection and expertise. The defense attorney in the real-life trial lost the case for himself with a procedural misstep similar to the one portrayed in "And the Rockets Dead Glare". In the episode, Russom asks Howard whether she had ever seen a murder victim killed by both a knife and a gun. This allows Howard to mention a second victim police suspect "Pony" Johnson murdered, which she would not have been allowed to mention had Russom not asked her. Homicide filmmakers sought to portray the trial scenes in a far more realistic light than most police drama shows, particularly with the inclusion of less dramatic courtroom elements such as Howard's waiting anxiously to testify and the awkward pauses during her testimony.

"And the Rockets' Dead Glare" presents a case for drug liberalization, arguing from the perspectives of homicide detectives Tim Bayliss and, particularly, John Munch that legalizing drugs would help curb violent crime. Munch's pro-drug liberalization comments in the episode were inspired by actor Richard Belzer's real-life personal history with drug abuse and drug dealing, which would go on to inspire further development of Munch's druggie and hippie past in future episodes. An arrangement of Frédéric Chopin's Fantaisie-Impromptu in C Minor, conducted by Louis Knatchvull, appears in "And the Rockets Dead Glare", as does the song "Rhythm and Blues" by Benjamin Antin.

== Reception ==
Ratings for Homicide: Life on the Street gradually declined since the series first premiered. In response, NBC announced to fans that a decision about whether Homicide would be renewed or canceled would depend on how the last four episodes of the season fared in the ratings, including "And the Rockets' Dead Glare". In its original American broadcast on March 17, 1993, the episode was watched by 6.61 million households, according to Nielsen Media Research, earning the episode a 7.1 rating. This constituted a decline in viewership compared to the previous week's episode, "A Dog and Pony Show", which was seen by 8.47 million viewers and received a 9.1 rating. Homicide ranked low in the Nielsen ratings compared to other shows the week of "And the Rockets' Dead Glare", ranking 78th for the week of March 15 to 21, with its timeslot competitor, the ABC comedy series Home Improvement, ranking number one with 22.3 million household viewers.

Harold Schindler of The Salt Lake Tribune praised the episode, making it one of his weekly recommendations and declaring Homicide "one of the better police procedural dramas to reach television".

== Home media ==
"And the Rockets Dead Glare" and the rest of the first and second-season episodes were included in the four-DVD box-set "Homicide: Life on the Street: The Complete Seasons 1 & 2", which was released by A&E Home Video on May 27, 2003, for $69.95.
