= Law & Disorder =

- Homicide: Life on the Street episode
- Episode no.: Season 3 Episode 16
- Directed by: John McNaughton
- Story by: James Yoshimura; Henry Bromell
- Teleplay by: Bonnie Mark; Julie Martin
- Cinematography by: Jean de Segonzac
- Production code: 316
- Original air date: February 24, 1995

Guest appearances
- Dana Ivey as Margie Bolander; Harlee McBride as Dr. Alyssa Dyer; Julie Lauren as Off. Anne Schanne; Valerie Perrine as Brigitta Svendsen; Chris Noth as Det. Mike Logan; John Waters as R. Vincent Smith; Ralph Tabakin as Dr. Scheiner; Sharon Ziman as Naomi

Episode chronology
← Previous "End Game"	Next → "The Old and the Dead"
- Homicide: Life on the Street season 3

"Law & Disorder" is the 16th episode of the third season of the American police drama television series Homicide: Life on the Street. It originally aired on NBC on February 24, 1995. The episode was written by Bonnie Mark and Julie Martin and directed by John McNaughton. The episode concludes elements of a storyline about the shooting of Beau Felton, Kay Howard, and Stanley Bolander.

== Plot summary ==
Because he responded to the call about the murder of Gordon Pratt—the prime suspect in the shooting of Bolander, Felton and Howard—Bayliss is given the unpleasant task of investigating the murder. Despite his protests, Gee orders Bayliss to question the other officers in the homicide unit, which makes him highly unpopular among his colleagues. No one in the unit considers Pratt's death to be unfortunate, and they all, to varying degrees, are offended by Bayliss's questions, despite the knowledge that he is merely following orders. The problem is compounded when Gee, dissatisfied by the investigation, orders Bayliss to double check the detectives' alibis.

Bayliss discovers that Munch has provided a false alibi and confronts him, to which Munch defiantly provides an even weaker alibi and offers to let Bayliss examine his weapon. Exhausted from having to question his fellow detectives, Bayliss chooses not to press the matter and later convinces Gee that the murder is unsolvable. It is strongly implied that Munch did kill Pratt, but no one cares and the case goes unsolved.

Pembleton, who usually partners with Bayliss, objects to his questions in a more subtle way by choosing to not be his partner on the case. Instead, he takes the case of a woman shot dead in a parking lot and asks Lewis to assist him—a whim he soon regrets. At the crime scene, Pembleton and Lewis are confused by the fact that no one saw the shooter or heard a gunshot, and a witness expresses the opinion that it must be "one of those black kids who go around shooting off guns." Pembleton points out that, statistically, the witness is probably correct that the shooter came from the nearby projects, while Lewis is offended by Pembleton's assumption that the shooter is probably black. Lewis also objects to Pembleton's method of starting the investigation by working their way down the list of registered handguns, pointing out that most crimes are committed by people with stolen or unregistered guns.

At first, the detectives are surprised when Pembleton's list immediately leads to a woman who confesses to murder. However, the murder turns out to be unrelated to their case, as the confession comes from a woman who had shot her boyfriend two days before, and mistakenly believes that Pembleton and Lewis have come to arrest her. They eventually find the perpetrator in the parking lot shooting: a little girl, living three doors down from the victim, who took her father's gun from its cabinet and fired it into the air without knowing where the bullet would land. Afterward, Pembleton and Lewis make peace by saying that if they caught the same case again, each would investigate it exactly as he did this one.

With all of his detectives either in the hospital or on other cases, Gee takes a rare case as a primary and reluctantly agrees to partner with Felton, who begs to be put back on duty after his hospitalization. At the crime scene, Felton is visibly upset by the body, and Gee's initial concern is replaced with anger when Felton, more traumatized by his shooting than he had admitted, loses his temper with Gee in the squad room. Gee bluntly tells Felton that trauma is only the latest in a long line of excuses for substandard work as a detective, and that he has never been good enough for the homicide unit.

In a comical subplot, the return of Bolander's memory prompts Munch to relax his vigil by Bolander's bed. Munch returns to the station to find himself the laughingstock of everyone who sees him. The reason why remains a mystery until Lewis advises him to visit the art gallery across the street, where Munch discovers that the main exhibit is a giant nude photograph of Munch, taken when he was a younger man. Munch confronts the artist, who turns out to be a bitter ex-girlfriend seeking to humiliate him over a bad breakup years previously. She refuses to remove the photograph, but compromises by covering the image Munch's genitals with a poster. Unfortunately, their public argument draws even more attention to the photograph, which becomes the subject of a newspaper article.

== Cultural references ==
The title is a reference to Homicide's sister show, Law & Order. The episode's cold open features a cameo from Det. Mike Logan, a character from Law & Order, who meets with Pembleton to hand over a fugitive who fled from Baltimore to New York City. Although the opening is unrelated to events in the rest of the episode, it bears a narrative significance in linking the continuities of Homicide and Law & Order. Over the course of the next four years, after Logan was replaced by the character of Rey Curtis, Homicide would use more intricate storylines to cross over with Law & Order three more times. In addition, the character of Munch would be transplanted to the series Law & Order: Special Victims Unit after the Homicide series finale in 1999, where the character talks about the naked picture incident in the second season episode "Secrets".
