= End Game (Homicide: Life on the Street) =

- Homicide: Life on the Street episode
- Steve Buscemi portrayed Gordon Pratt, the man accused of shooting three detectives
- Episode no.: Season 3 Episode 15
- Directed by: Lee Bonner
- Story by: James Yoshimura; Henry Bromell
- Teleplay by: Rogers Turrentine
- Cinematography by: Jean de Segonzac
- Production code: 315
- Original air date: February 10, 1995

Guest appearances
- Tony Lo Bianco as Det. Mitch Drummond; Steve Buscemi as Gordon Pratt; Dana Ivey as Margie Bolander; Clayton LeBouef as Capt. George Barnfather; Irv Ziff as Mr. Lebkowitz; Sharon Ziman as Naomi; Gloria Reuben as Det. Theresa Walker

Episode chronology
← Previous "Dead End"	Next → "Law & Disorder"
- Homicide: Life on the Street season 3

"End Game" is the 15th episode of the third season of the American police drama television series Homicide: Life on the Street. It originally aired on NBC on February 10, 1995. The episode was written by Rogers Turrentine and directed by Lee Bonner. The episode continues a storyline about the shooting of Beau Felton, Kay Howard, and Stanley Bolander.

== Plot summary ==
Barnfather gives the homicide unit hours to solve the case of the detective shootings before it is handed over to Violent Crimes. The investigation, still led by Pembleton, leads to a new prime suspect: Gordon Pratt, the resident of the apartment the detectives had mistakenly approached when trying to serve a warrant to Glen Holton. Pembleton, Bayliss and Mitch Drummond search Pratt's home, his parents' house and his workplace before tracking him down in a massage parlor. Meanwhile, Bolander, Felton and Howard are in various stages of recovery following their surgeries. Munch and Bolander's ex-wife stay with Bolander to keep him company; he seems fine after his first surgery but awakens after his second surgery with no memory of who Munch is.

The detectives alternate interrogating Pratt, who reveals himself to be a racist loner pretending to be a highly educated intellectual with a grudge against the concepts of government and society. Bayliss, however, finds Pratt's high school records and discovers that his intellectualism is a ruse. Hoping to rattle a confession out of him, Pembleton tricks Pratt into attempting to translate a passage from Plato, but unlike Pembleton, Pratt cannot read the original Greek, and his radical misinterpretation of Plato's words reveals that he is a fake. Unfortunately, this strategy backfires on Pembleton when an angered Pratt demands a lawyer. The attorney arranges Pratt's release, leading to rising tensions within the homicide unit and a physical altercation between Munch and Pembleton. In the episode's epilogue, Bayliss is called to a crime scene and discovers that Pratt has been shot; reporters question Bayliss whether a police officer seeking revenge for the shootings may have been responsible.

== Cultural references ==
While searching through Pratt's apartment, the police discover a photograph which echoes Lee Harvey Oswald's infamous "backyard photos," with Pratt himself mimicking Oswald's pose.
