= Oscar Requer =

American police officer

Oscar L. Requer
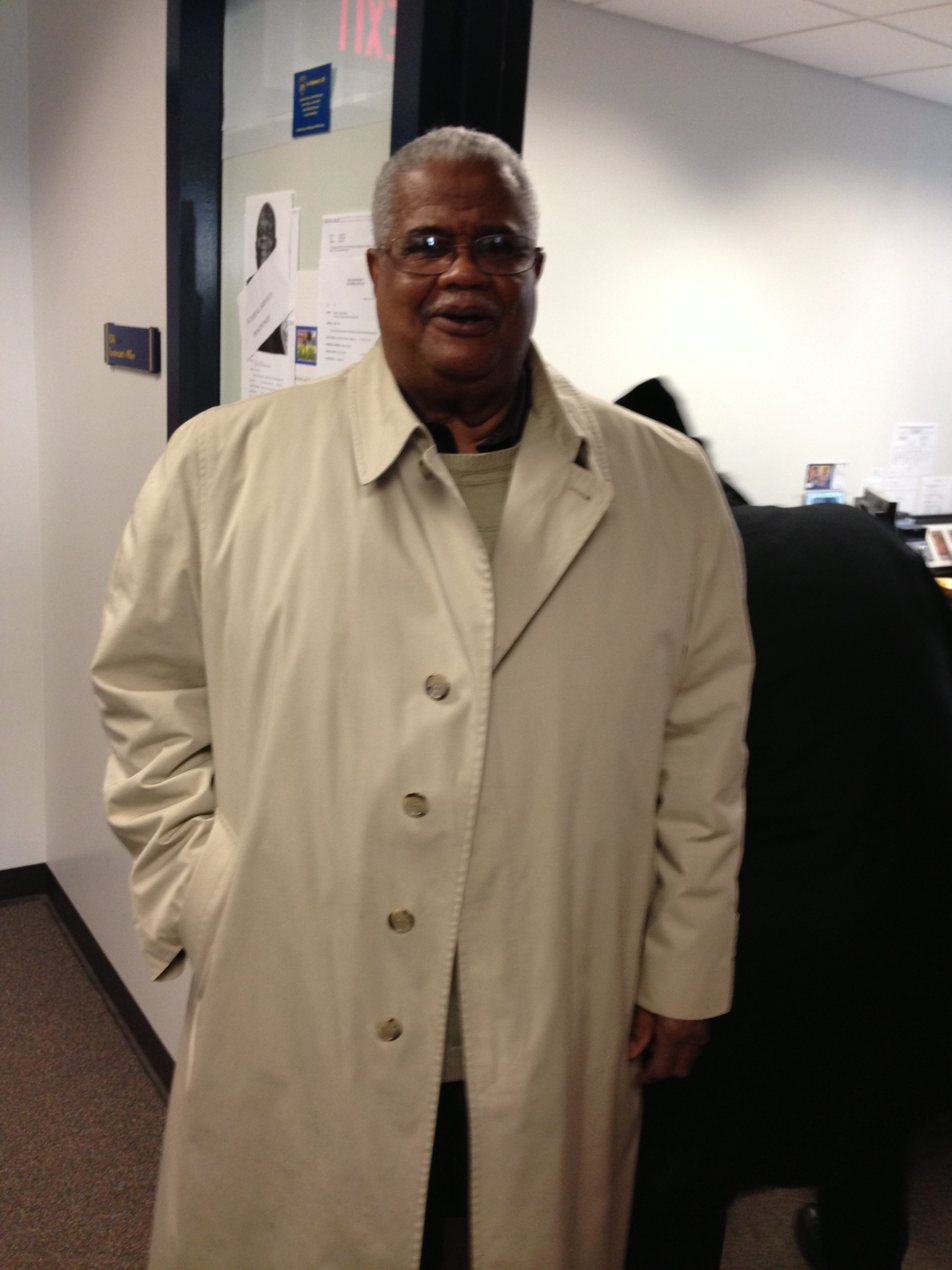
- Oscar Requer inside the Baltimore Police Headquarters on March 22, 2013
- Other names: Rick; Bunk
- Police career
- Country: United States
- Department: Baltimore Police Department
- Service years: 1964-2007
- Rank: Detective

Oscar "Rick" Requer is a former detective of the Baltimore Police Department.

Requer joined the department in 1964 as a Western District patrolman who would eventually move into the department's Homicide Unit. He was featured working under Sergeant Jay Landsman and Lieutenant Gary D'Addario whose Homicide unit was featured in David Simon's Homicide: A Year on the Killing Streets book. An African American, Requer's investigative skills earned him a position in the BPD's Criminal Investigation Division during a time period in which African American officers were still subject to racial harassment in the district roll call rooms. Requer would later man the retirement services bureau before retiring in 2007 and would provide inspiration for fictional Detective Bunk Moreland of the HBO drama series The Wire.

A character named "Oscar Requer" appeared in the "Transitions" episode on the fifth season of The Wire. The fictional Oscar Requer (played by Roscoe Orman), was a patrolman working a night shift and a former partner of detective Lester Freamon's.
