= Donald Worden =

- Born: Baltimore, Maryland
- Other name: The Big Man
- Police career
- Country: United States
- Department: Baltimore Police Department
- Service years: 1962–99
- Rank: Detective
- Badge no.: 145
- Other work: Former B.C.P.D. H.Q. Homicide Big Man Case

Donald "Don" Worden is a retired Baltimore Police Department detective who was featured in David Simon's non-fiction book about the homicide unit, Homicide: A Year on the Killing Streets (1991) and provided the inspiration for the Homicide: Life on the Street television series character Stanley Bolander, played by Ned Beatty.

== Biography ==
Worden, a native of Baltimore's Hampden neighborhood, joined the Baltimore Police Department in 1962, and had worked in the department's Northwestern district before becoming a Homicide Detective. Nicknamed, "The Big Man", he was a veteran member of Sergeant Terry McLarney's Homicide squad working under Shift Lieutenant Gary D'Addario.

== Bibliography ==
- Simon, David (2006) [1st. pub. Houghton Mifflin:1991]. Homicide: A Year on the Killing Streets (4th ed.). New York: Owl Books. ISBN 0-8050-8075-9.
