= Harry Edgerton =

American police officer

- Born: New York City, US
- Police career
- Country: United States
- Department: Baltimore Police Department
- Rank: Detective

Harry Edgerton is a former detective of the Baltimore Police Department. He is notable for his work in the Homicide Unit and on the investigation of drug dealer Melvin Williams with former BPD Detective Ed Burns and the Drug Enforcement Administration. He is notable for working under Sergeant Roger Nolan and Lieutenant Gary D'Addario whose Homicide unit was featured in David Simon's book Homicide: A Year on the Killing Streets. The son of a New York jazz pianist, Edgerton would provide the inspiration for Homicide: Life on the Street character Frank Pembleton, played by Andre Braugher who would win a Primetime Emmy Award for Outstanding Lead Actor in a Drama Series for his role.
