= Jim Finnerty =

American television producer

Jim Finnerty is an American television producer. He worked on all seven seasons of the NBC police drama Homicide: Life on the Street. He often works with Homicide executive producer Tom Fontana. He also worked on HBO's Oz.

== Biography ==
Finnerty began his broadcast career as a news anchor in Champaign, Illinois. That was followed by anchor/producer credits for network affiliated stations in Cleveland, Ohio, Columbus, Ohio and Portland, Oregon. He also has hosted for award-winning talk shows in Los Angeles and Sacramento, California as well as the host for two successful specials on earthquakes and internet connectivity for KTVU-TV in San Francisco.

As the senior executive producer for CNX Media in San Francisco, Jim directed the broadcast teams that developed, produced and distributed nationally syndicated programming on health issues, personal finance and consumer travel. Jim was directly responsible for editorial supervision and creative decisions on syndicated daily television news inserts: Quicken.com Personal Finance Reports, HealthCentral Reports with Dr. Dean Edell and the Consumer Travel Reports.

Finnerty was the unit production manager and a supervising producer on the series Homicide: Life on the Street for the pilot episode in 1993. He reprised this role when the show returned for a full season. He remained in this position until he was promoted to co-executive producer for the fourth season in 1995. He was awarded a plaque from the Directors Guild of America for his work as unit production manager when the episode "The Documentary" won the award for Outstanding Directorial Achievement in Dramatic Series. He was promoted to executive producer for the seventh and final season in 1998. He was also credited as an executive producer of the feature length follow-up Homicide: The Movie in 2000. He remained the series unit production manager throughout its run and was responsible for budgetary concerns at production meetings.

While still working on Homicide Finnerty also served as a co-executive producer on the first season of Tom Fontana's HBO prison drama Oz. He returned to Oz as an executive producer for the sixth and final season in 2002.

He worked as an executive producer and unit production manager on a second police drama with Fontana in 2000 - UPN's The Beat. He also served as an executive producer with Fontana on the television movie Shot in the Heart, which was scripted by Homicide writer Frank Pugliese in 2001.

He was an executive producer and unit production manager for Fontana's short-lived courtroom drama The Jury in 2004. He received the same credits for Fontana's 2008 drama series The Bedford Diaries. He was also an executive producer for Fontana's pilot M. O. N. Y. which was not picked up to series in 2008.
