= Smoke Gets in Your Eyes (disambiguation) =

"Smoke Gets in Your Eyes" is a show tune from the musical Roberta.

"Smoke Gets in Your Eyes" may also refer to:

- "Smoke Gets in Your Eyes" (Homicide: Life on the Street), an episode of Homicide: Life on the Street
- "Smoke Gets in Your Eyes" (Mad Men), an episode of Mad Men
- Smoke Gets in Your Eyes: And Other Lessons from the Crematory, memoir by Caitlin Doughty
