= Terrence McLarney =

American detective

Terrence Patrick McLarney
- Other name: T.P. or Terry
- Police career
- Department: Baltimore City Police Department
- Service years: 1976–present
- Rank: Police Officer, 1976; Detective, 1981; Detective Sergeant; Detective Lieutenant; Detective Major, 2008; Homicide Commanding Officer, 2008-2011; Lieutenant, 2011

Terrence Patrick "Terry" McLarney is a lieutenant assigned to the Baltimore Police Department's Southwestern (8th) District.

McLarney is best known as a longtime city detective, who from 2008 through 2011 was the commanding officer of Baltimore's Homicide Unit.

== Early life and education ==
McLarney is a native of the suburbs of Washington, D.C., and an alumnus of American University (SPA/BA '75). In 1981, McLarney graduated from the University of Baltimore School of Law with a Juris Doctor degree.

== Early Baltimore Police career ==
McLarney joined the Department in 1976 and was assigned as a patrolman to the city's Central (1st) District. Later he was promoted to Sergeant and transferred to the Police Department's Western (7th) District. In 1985, McLarney survived an incident where he was shot in the abdomen while patrolling the Western District.

== Career as a homicide detective ==
In 1981 McLarney was appointed a detective and transferred to Homicide. At that time, McLarney was the youngest detective assigned to the storied unit. McLarney would serve as a Homicide detective at every rank assigned to that unit. This includes as a Detective, the individual responsible for the investigation of each murder; as a detective Sergeant, who supervises "squads" of five detectives; as a Detective Lieutenant, who is responsible for the management of four squads of detectives and lastly and most notably as the commanding officer of the Homicide Section. From 2008 through 2011, McLarney held the rank of Detective Major throughout his tenure as the head of the Homicide Section. In July 2008, McLarney was named the official commander of the Baltimore Police Department's Homicide Unit, a position of which he had been the acting commander since May 2008.

== Relationship to David Simon's Homicide: Life on the Street ==
In 1988, McLarney along with Detective Sergeant Roger Nolan and Detective Sergeant Jay Landsman were each heading individual squads of detectives under the command of Detective Lieutenant Gary D'Addario whose Homicide unit was featured in David Simon's Homicide: A Year on the Killing Streets book. McLarney has also appeared on the commentary describing the production of HBO's The Wire, another work of David Simon displaying the Baltimore Police Department.

Preceded by Fred Taber Jr.	Homicide Section Commanding Officer	Succeeded by Garnell Green
