= Roger Nolan =

American police officer

- Born: October 27, 1939; West Baltimore, Maryland, U.S.
- Died: February 2, 2023 (aged 83)
- Known for: Homicide Squad Supervisor featured in "Homicide: A Year on the Killing Streets"
- Police career
- Country: Baltimore Police Department
- Department: Homicide Unit
- Service years: 1963 – 2009 (46 years)
- Status: Retired
- Rank: Sergeant

Roger Nolan was a former sergeant of the Baltimore Police Department's Homicide Unit. He was notable for being a Homicide Squad Supervisor, alongside fellow sergeants Terry McLarney and Jay Landsman, under the command of Lieutenant Gary D'Addario, whose work was featured in David Simon's Homicide: A Year on the Killing Streets book. A native of West Baltimore and a former Marine, Nolan joined the department in 1963 working in the State's Attorney's Unit, and the Western, Eastern, and Northwestern Districts, before becoming a supervisor in the department's Homicide Unit.

Nolan retired a day before his 70th birthday in 2009.

He married his wife Minnie in 1967 and had three children with her. He died on February 2, 2023, at the age of 83.
