= Stockings with Care =

US non-profit organization

Stockings with Care (SWC) is a 501(c)(3) non-profit organization founded in the United States that grants families in need supplies and gifts for Christmas. It provides toys as well as necessities like clothing, food, diapers, books and strollers. Individual donors (aka "Santas"), corporations and a small army of volunteers come together to purchase and wrap the gifts. They are then delivered anonymously to the parents before the holidays. In total, 40,000 children have had presents on Christmas thanks to Stockings With Care.

== History ==
Stockings with Care was founded in 1992 by Rosalie Joseph and Tom Fontana and is volunteer based. The process begins in October, and every year they have given 100% of the proceeds to the families in need.

On November 16, 2011, they held a "Stockings with Care's Celebrity Bartending Night" at Hudson Station Bar and Grille to help raise funds. Celebrities that attended were Jesse L. Martin, Carrie Preston, Dean Winters, Kate Mulgrew, Becky Ann Baker, Dylan Baker, Amy Carlson, Alana Blahoski, John Benjamin Hickey, Phyllis Somerville, David Costible, Kate Shindle, Kelli Giddish, Lorenzo Pisoni, LaChanze, Annie Parisse, Diane Neal, Danny Pino, Paul Schulze, Nancy Giles, Zuzanna Szadkowski, and from daytime television: Austin Peck, Terri Conn, Ilene Kristen, Roger Howarth, Melissa Archer, Bree Williamson, Gina Tognoni, Lenny Platt, Beth Ann Bonner, Bonnie Dennison, Caitlin Van Zandt, and Academy Award winner Celeste Holm. The event raised over $6,000.
