= Bonnie Mark =

American TV writer, producer (active 1993–2011)

- Occupation: Television Writer
- Writing career
- Period: 1994–2011
- Notable work: Third Watch

Bonnie Mark is an American former television writer and producer. She worked on the ABC crime drama NYPD Blue and the NBC crime dramas Third Watch and Homicide: Life on the Street. She was nominated for a Writers Guild of America Award for her work on Homicide.

== Biography ==
=== 1990s ===
Mark began working in television as a script co-ordinator for the first season of Homicide: Life on the Street in 1993. The series was executive produced by Tom Fontana and focused on a single squad of homicide detectives in the Baltimore police department. She was promoted to staff writer for the second season in Spring 1994. She remained a staff writer for the third season in Fall 1994. She contributed to four third-season episodes as a writer. She wrote the teleplay for the episode "Fits Like a Glove" from a story by Fontana and story editor Julie Martin. Mark, Fontana and Martin were nominated for a Writers Guild of America Award for episodic drama at the February 1996 ceremony for writing "Fits Like a Glove". She co-wrote the story for the episode "The City That Bleeds" with executive story editor James Yoshimura, Martin and story editor Jorge Zamacona wrote the teleplay. She co-wrote the teleplay for the episode "Law and Disorder" with Martin from a story by Yoshimura and co-executive producer Henry Bromell. She wrote the teleplay for the episode "Nothing Personal" from a story by Yoshimura and Fontana. She was promoted to story editor for the fourth season in 1995. She wrote the teleplay for the episode "Autofocus" from a story by Fontana and Bromell. She left the series at the end of the fourth season. She contributed to five episodes in total as a writer.

She served as an executive story editor for the police drama High Incident in 1996. The show featured eight suburban police officers at work performing street law enforcement and in their home lives. The show was created by Steven Spielberg, Michael Pavone, Eric Bogosian and Dave Alan Johnson.

In 1997 she worked as a writer for the HBO drama Feds. The series was created and executive produced by Dick Wolf. She wrote the episode "Smoking Gun". The show was canceled after one season. Also in 1997 she served as a co-producer for the short-lived crime drama C-16: FBI.

In 1998 she worked as a co-producer for the new legal drama series Michael Hayes. The series was created by Paul Haggis and John Romano. It focused on a new deputy prosecutor in New York. It was canceled while airing its first season.

=== 2000s ===
In 2000 she served as a producer for the pilot of psychiatric drama Wonderland. The show was created by Peter Berg and focused on doctors at a psychiatric inpatient facility. Mark did not return when the series was picked up. The show was canceled after eight episodes.

In 2001 she became a supervising producer and writer for the NBC emergency services drama Third Watch. The show was created by retired police officer Edward Allen Bernero and television producer John Wells. She wrote four second-season episodes; "The Tys That Bind", "Run of the Mill", "A Rock and a Hard Place" and "Walking Wounded". She left the crew after the second season ended.

In 2002 she served as a supervising producer for the short-lived drama series The Court. Also in 2002 she served as a consulting producer and writer for the police drama Robbery Homicide Division. The series was created by Barry Schindel and executive produced by Michael Mann and focused on a Los Angeles homicide unit. She wrote the story for the episode "In/Famous", Frank Spotnitz wrote the teleplay.

She was hired as a co-executive producer for the eleventh season of ABC police drama NYPD Blue in 2003. The series was created by David Milch and Steven Bochco and followed a New York homicide unit. She co-wrote the story (with retired police officer and executive producer Bill Clark) and wrote the teleplay for the episodes "Shear Stupidity" and "Passing the Stone".

In 2005 she served as a co-executive producer for new ABC drama Eyes. The show follows a firm of fringe private investigators. The series aired as a mid-season replacement and was canceled after six episodes.

Mark's last credits are in 2011, writing three episodes for Star Wars: The Clone Wars.
