= The Beat (TV series) =

- Genre: Drama
- Created by: Tom Fontana
- Starring: Derek Cecil; Mark Ruffalo; Heather Burns; Poppy Montgomery; Tom Noonan; Lea DeLaria
- Composers: Tomandandy evolution
- Country of origin: United States
- Original language: English
- No. of seasons: 1
- No. of episodes: 13 (7 unaired)

Production
- Executive producers: Barry Levinson; Tom Fontana; Jim Finnerty
- Running time: 60 minutes
- Production companies: The Levinson/Fontana Company; Viacom Productions

Original release
- Network: UPN
- Release: March 21 – April 25, 2000

The Beat is an American drama television series produced by Viacom Productions. It premiered on UPN on March 21, 2000, and ended after only six episodes a month later on April 25. Seven additional episodes were produced although they were never broadcast.

== Premise ==
The series focuses on the day-to-day experiences of two uniformed police officers, Mike Dorrigan and Zane Marinelli, of the NYPD and their attempts to deal with day-to-day life with their girlfriends Elizabeth and Beatrice, and work in New York City.

== Cast ==
=== Main ===
- Derek Cecil as Mike Dorigan
- Mark Ruffalo as Zane Marinelli
- Heather Burns as Beatrice Felsen
- Poppy Montgomery as Elizabeth Waclawek
- Tom Noonan as Howard Schmidt
- Lea DeLaria as Kathy Speck

=== Recurring ===
- Jeffrey Donovan as Brad Ulrich
- Lee Tergesen as Steve Dorigan
- David Zayas as Rei Morales

== Episodes ==
No.	Title	Directed by	Written by	Original release date
1	"The Beat Goes On"	Barry Levinson	Tom Fontana	March 21, 2000
Beat cops Mike Dorigan and Zane Marinelli juggle a number of cases with their girlfriends.
2	"They Say It's Your Birthday"	Leslie Libman	Eric Overmyer	March 28, 2000
On his 29th birthday, Zane learns that Beatrice torched his apartment and framed his father for it. John Munch, who has transferred to the NYPD's Special Victims Unit, arrives at the scene of a DOA.
3	"Three Little Words"	Jay Tobias	Sean Whitesell	April 4, 2000
Zane insists that Mike drop the idea of arresting Beatrice for arson, while Steve makes plans to throw an engagement party for Mike and Elizabeth.
4	"Can I Get a Witness?"	Ed Bianchi	Anya Epstein	April 11, 2000
Zane gets into a fight with Beatrice's new boyfriend.
5	"Cueca Solo"	Bruno Kirby	Sunil Nayar	April 18, 2000
Zane is assigned to desk duty while Mike is partnered with Officer Skloff.
6	"Someone to Watch Over Me"	Adam Bernstein	Julie Martin	April 25, 2000
With the assault charges against him dropped, Zane helps Mike prepare for the wedding.
7	"Every Beat of My Heart"	Clark Johnson	Bradford Winters	Unaired
8	"Get It On" "Get It On (Bang the Gong)"	Jason Priestley	Story by : Tom Fontana & Julie Martin; Teleplay by : Laura Cahill	Unaired
9	"Call on Me"	TBD	Story by : Tom Fontana & Anya Epstein; Teleplay by : Jason Yoshimura	Unaired
10	"Dark End of the Street"	Goran Gajic	Julie Martin & Sunil Nayar	Unaired
11	"Gimme Shelter"	TBD	Anya Epstein & Bradford Winters	Unaired
12	"Tangled Up in Blue"	TBD	Sean Whitesell & Jason Yoshimura	Unaired
13	"Come as You Are"	TBD	Story by : Tom Fontana & Frank Pugliese; Teleplay by : Frank Pugliese	Unaired

== Production ==
The series was produced by many people who worked on Homicide: Life on the Street including Barry Levinson, Tom Fontana, Anya Epstein, Eric Overmyer, Irene Burns and Jim Finnerty. Many of the producers also collaborated on Oz including Barry Levinson, Tom Fontana, Irene Burns and Jim Finnerty.

The series is also notable as being one of the many series in which the character Det. John Munch, played by Richard Belzer, has appeared. The others include: Homicide: Life on the Street, Law & Order, The X-Files, Law & Order: Special Victims Unit, Law & Order: Trial by Jury, Arrested Development, and The Wire.

== Reception ==
The Beat is rated 5.8 on IMDb, and 92% on Rotten Tomatoes.
