= Wonderland (American TV series) =

2000 American television series

- Also known as: Bellevue
- Genre: Medical drama
- Created by: Peter Berg
- Starring: Ted Levine; Michelle Forbes; Michael Jai White; Billy Burke; Martin Donovan; Joelle Carter; Patricia Clarkson
- Theme music composer: Madonna
- Country of origin: United States
- Original language: English
- No. of seasons: 1
- No. of episodes: 8

Production
- Executive producers: Brian Grazer; Ron Howard; Tony Krantz; Peter Berg; John David Coles
- Producers: Peter R. McIntosh; James Steven Sadwith; Bonnie Mark
- Production locations: New York City, New York, United States
- Running time: 50 minutes
- Production companies: Hostage Productions; Imagine Television; Touchstone Television

Original release
- Network: ABC
- Release: March 30 – April 6, 2000
- Network: The 101 Network
- Release: January 28 – March 4, 2009

Wonderland is an American medical drama television series created by Peter Berg that aired on ABC. It depicted daily life in a mental institution from the perspectives of both the doctors and patients. Due to poor initial ratings, only two episodes aired on ABC during its original two-week run, on March 30 and April 6, 2000, respectively. The remaining six episodes eventually debuted when DirecTV aired all eight filmed episodes on its channel The 101 Network starting January 14, 2009, concluding on March 4, 2009. In 2014, the entire series was available for free on Hulu (which has since become a subscription service).

== Main cast ==
- Ted Levine – Dr. Robert Banger (8 episodes, 2000)
- Michelle Forbes – Dr. Lyla Garrity (8 episodes, 2000)
- Michael Jai White – Dr. Derrick Hatcher (7 episodes, 2000)
- Billy Burke – Dr. Abe Matthews (8 episodes, 2000)
- Martin Donovan – Dr. Neil Harrison (8 episodes, 2000)
- Joelle Carter – Dr. Heather Miles (6 episodes, 2000)
- Patricia Clarkson – Tammy Banger (8 episodes, 2000)

== Main crew ==
- Peter Berg – creator, executive producer (writer/director 1 episode, 2000 "Pilot")
- Tony Krantz – executive producer (8 episodes, 2000)
- James Steven Sadwith – consulting producer (7 episodes, 2000)
- Brian Grazer – executive producer (unknown episodes)
- Peter R. McIntosh – producer (unknown episodes)
- Barry M. Schkolnick
- John David Coles (unknown episodes)
- Charles McDougall (unknown episodes)
- Oz Scott

== Episodes ==
| No. | Title | Directed by | Written by | Original release date |
|---|---|---|---|---|
| 1 | "Pilot" | Peter Berg | Peter Berg | March 30, 2000 |
| 2 | "20/20 Hindsight" | Charles McDougall | Bonnie Mark | April 6, 2000 |
| 3 | "Spell Check" | John David Coles | Story by : Peter Berg & Sasha Bardey; Teleplay by : Peter Berg | January 28, 2009 |
| 4 | "Full Moon" | Adam Bernstein | Story by : Peter Berg & Robert Berger; Teleplay by : Peter Berg | February 4, 2009 |
| 5 | "The Raw and the Cooked" | Adam Bernstein | Mark Leyner | February 11, 2009 |
| 6 | "Wilt Chamberlain 3.0" | Oz Scott | Scott Z. Burns | February 18, 2009 |
| 7 | "Personality Plus" | Peter Berg | Peter Berg & Mark Leyner | February 25, 2009 |
| 8 | "Hello, Goodbye" | Charles McDougall | Guy Zimmerman | March 4, 2009 |

== Reception and ratings ==
The series received positive reviews, with a critics score of 85% on review aggregator Metacritic.. Its pilot episode attracted a viewership of 13 million, with this falling to 7.5 million for the second episode.

== Theme music ==
The theme song of the show is a simple humming. It is performed by Madonna, although the DirecTV re-airing of the show uses a different theme song (not by Madonna).
