= Monsieur Spade =

American neo-noir television miniseries

- Genre: Neo-noir; Crime drama Mystery; Period drama
- Created by: Scott Frank; Tom Fontana
- Based on: Sam Spade by Dashiell Hammett
- Written by: Scott Frank; Tom Fontana
- Directed by: Scott Frank
- Starring: Clive Owen
- Composer: Carlos Rafael Rivera
- Countries of origin: United States; France
- Original languages: English; French
- No. of series: 1
- No. of episodes: 6

Production
- Executive producers: Scott Frank; Tom Fontana; Clive Owen; Barry Levinson; Teddy Schwarzman; Michael Heimler; Caroline Benjo; Barbara Letellier; Simon Arnal; Carole Scotta; Carlo Martinelli; David Helpern
- Production companies: Haut et Court TV; Flitcraft; The Levinson/Fontana Company; Black Bear Television

Original release
- Network: AMC (US); Canal+ (France)
- Release: January 14 – February 18, 2024

Monsieur Spade is a neo-noir television miniseries created by Scott Frank and Tom Fontana, and starring Clive Owen as Dashiell Hammett's fictional private detective Sam Spade.

== Premise ==
The series was originally released in the United States by AMC Networks, which provided the following synopsis:

The year is 1963, and the legendary Detective Sam Spade is enjoying his retirement in the South of France. By contrast to his days as a private eye in San Francisco, Spade's life in Bozouls is peaceful and quiet. But the rumored return of his old adversary will change everything. Six beloved nuns have been brutally murdered at the local convent. As the town grieves, secrets emerge, and new leads are established. Spade learns that the murders are somehow connected to a mysterious child who is believed to possess great powers.

== Cast ==
=== Main ===
- Clive Owen as Sam Spade
- Cara Bossom as Teresa
- Denis Ménochet as Chief of Police Patrice Michaud
- Louise Bourgoin as Marguerite Devereaux
- Chiara Mastroianni as Gabrielle
- Stanley Weber as Jean-Pierre Devereaux
- Matthew Beard as George Fitzsimmons
- Jonathan Zaccaï as Philippe Saint-André
- Rebecca Root as Cynthia Fitzsimmons
- Oscar Lesage as Henri Thibaut

The following actors are credited with the main cast for the episodes in which they appear:

- Dean Winters as Father Matthew
- Alfre Woodard as Virginia Dell

=== Recurring ===
- Caroline Silhol as Audrey Saint-André
- Clotilde Mollet as Helena Thibaut
- Vincent Nemeth as Doctor Pouchol

== Episodes ==
| No. | Title | Directed by | Written by | Original release date |
|---|---|---|---|---|
| 1 | "Episode 1" | Scott Frank | Tom Fontana & Scott Frank | January 14, 2024 |
In 1955, American detective Sam Spade is paid to deliver a 4-year-old girl named Teresa to the French town of Bozouls. Philippe Saint-André, Teresa's criminal father, is blackmailing some townspeople, including a woman named Gabrielle, about their activities during World War II. Gabrielle eventually becomes Sam's wife, but dies in 1961. In 1963, Sam has inherited her estate and co-owns a nightclub with singer Marguerite Devereaux. He is told he will develop emphysema if he doesn't stop smoking. Jean-Pierre, Marguerite's jealous husband, wants Sam to buy the other half of the nightclub and stay away from her. Teresa now lives at a local convent. A young man, George, comes to Sam's estate and asks if he can paint landscapes there as his father once did. Sam learns of a trust fund created by Teresa's dead mother, Brigid, containing funds (from stolen property) that Teresa is to get when she is 18. Brigid created the trust fund to protect the money from Philippe. One evening, Philippe calls Sam, warning him to stay away from Teresa. The call ends as Sam hears a gunshot over the phone. The following night, Teresa comes running to Sam's estate, telling him that Philippe visited the convent after having been shot. She adds that a monk then appeared and hit the mother superior. At the convent, Sam finds six murdered nuns.
| 2 | "Episode 2" | Scott Frank | Scott Frank & Tom Fontana | January 21, 2024 |
Sam prepares breakfast for two, then discovers that Teresa is gone and so begins a search. Finding his car's tires slashed, he takes another car. He comes upon George, who tells Sam that he saw Teresa on the road, looking distraught. At the convent, Sam goes to the mother superior's office and takes away some personnel folders on the nuns. He later suspects that one nun's folder is missing. Sam finds Teresa in the convent bell tower. As they drive away, they are shot at by a man who rides off on a motorcycle. Sam chases in the car, but the shooter escapes. Later, Chief of Police Patrice Michaud and his brother retrieve a bullet lodged in the car and conclude it is from a French Army rifle. Philippe's criminal file, retrieved by Henri, has lots of blacked-out material, leading Sam to conclude Philippe is a spy. Henri adds that Philippe was hiding an Algerian woman in his quarters. In a flashback, Patrice and the mother superior discuss awful events from the past, including killings, and what to do about Philippe — Patrice wants either to kill him or to have Sam do so; the mother superior resists. We also learn that Jean-Pierre suffers PTSD from the horrors of his war experiences. Back in the present, George introduces Sam to his mother, Cynthia Fitzsimmons, who asks Sam if she can view a painting her late husband did, now in Sam's home. She says she also knows Philippe. The discord and unhappiness between Jean-Pierre and Marguerite continues. Sam asks Teresa for details on what she witnessed earlier. She says, reluctantly, that a wounded Philippe had shown up at the convent with a boy, asking Teresa to hide him. The killer had later asked the nuns where the boy was, but they didn't talk and so were shot, one by one. Teresa had saved herself only by stabbing the killer with a knife concealed in her doll. Later, Samir, an employee at the nightclub, finds the boy hiding in Marguerite's office.
| 3 | "Episode 3" | Scott Frank | Tom Fontana & Scott Frank | January 28, 2024 |
In a flashback, a discussion between Sam and Philippe fills in some of the back story about Philippe's attempts to blackmail Gabrielle, and why she wanted Philippe to disappear. In the present, Marguerite's employee Samir takes the boy he found, Zayd, to his home, asking his family and mates to protect him. But as immigrants, they are concerned about the legality of doing so, fearing arrest and deportation. They debate about whether Zayd is the Mahdi, the chosen one. Eventually, they consult with their imam, who tells them that the boy is extremely important. Meanwhile, Zayd keeps writing in what appears to be code, raising questions about whether he has advanced encryption/decryption capabilities. In a flashback, Gabrielle tells Sam, now her husband, that she is sick and doesn't expect to live long. In the present, Sam and Jean-Pierre discuss Gabrielle and how the death of her first husband, Jacque, affected her mentally. Jean-Pierre is upset, claiming to have been shortchanged in Gabrielle's will and says that Sam, who inherited most of her estate, should compensate him. But he adds that he won't keep fighting for this, as Sam's likely to die soon from smoking anyway. Sam reveals to Teresa that the money in her trust fund came from her father and mother's illegal dealings — in stolen antiques and worse. Philippe calls Sam and sets up a nighttime meeting with him in the cemetery. Taking his gun, Sam goes there, but finds no one. Suddenly fearing for Teresa's safety, he races back home, but finds her unharmed. But he hears someone in the house and finds Helena, his housekeeper, lying unconscious on the floor. Sam is suddenly and violently attacked by a man. As the two fight, the Fitzsimmons, who have bugged Sam's house, listen in. When George grabs his gun to go help Sam, Cynthia stops him, saying they have orders not to interfere.
| 4 | "Episode 4" | Scott Frank | Scott Frank & Tom Fontana | February 4, 2024 |
1945: Jacques meets Gabrielle in the dark. Jacques believes they are leaving together. Gabrielle accuses Jacques of something and shoots him. One after another more than 5 or 6 people show up and each shoots Jacques. Philippe and his mother hear the shots, and apparently they know what has happened and are in on it. Everyone is in one it. Everyone shoots him: Mother Superior, the doctor, Patrice, and more. Someone in Sam's house attacks Helena, then tries to strangle Sam. Henri saves him. Sam sends Henri, Helena, and Teresa upstairs. He then brutally interrogates the attacker, who is from SDECE, the French secret service during the Algerian war. Marguerite is taken to speak with Jean-Pierre's father, who is dying. Marguerite hates him and will not forgive him for what he has done, especially to Jean-Pierre. The second SDECE man is found dead in Sam's swimming pool. He was shot in the back of the head, but Henri claims that he only winged him in the arm. Patrice warns Sam that he is not in San Francisco any more and cannot do whatever he wants. Jean-Pierre's father is dying. He gives a packet of letters (from Jean-Pierre?) to Marguerite. Samir's wife warns him about a lurker and that the boy is weird. Jean-Pierre talks with an old friend who was tortured by the FLN. Marguerite confesses that she cooperated with Jean-Pierre's father to try to get him out of the war. Jean-Pierre confesses to Marguerite about some deal with the devil. Jean-Pierre turns the boy, Zayd, over to Philippe. Sam and Patrice have lunch with George and his mother Cynthia. Sam becomes suspicious about their activities. Are they spying?
| 5 | "Episode 5" | Scott Frank | Tom Fontana & Scott Frank | February 11, 2024 |
| 6 | "Episode 6" | Scott Frank | Scott Frank & Tom Fontana | February 18, 2024 |

== Production ==
Monsieur Spade is a co-production between AMC and Canal+. The co-creators are Scott Frank and Tom Fontana, who also wrote the scripts and served as executive producers. Additionally, Frank directed all episodes. The series was filmed in France.

== Release ==
The series, which consists of six episodes, premiered on AMC, AMC+, Sundance TV and Acorn TV on January 14, 2024. A first look image and teaser trailer were released in September 2023.

== Reception ==
The review aggregator website Rotten Tomatoes reported a 77% approval rating, with an average rating of 7.8/10, based on 26 critic reviews. The website's critics consensus reads, "Commanding the camera's full attention amidst the French countryside, Clive Owen makes for a mesmerizingly craggy Sam Spade even as the series around him struggles to live up to its hallowed lineage." On Metacritic, the series holds a weighted average score of 70 out of 100, based on 18 critics, indicating "generally favorable reviews".
