= Homicide: Life on the Street season 3 =

Homicide: Life on the Street
- Season 3
- Season 3 U.S. DVD cover
- Starring: Daniel Baldwin; Richard Belzer; Andre Braugher; Isabella Hofmann; Clark Johnson; Yaphet Kotto; Melissa Leo; Kyle Secor; Ned Beatty
- No. of episodes: 20

Release
- Original network: NBC
- Original release: October 14, 1994 – May 5, 1995

Season chronology
- ← Previous; Season 2 Next → Season 4

The third season of Homicide: Life on the Street aired in the United States on the NBC television network from October 14, 1994, to May 5, 1995, and contained 20 episodes. It was the first full season of episodes. Beginning in the third season, Homicide was moved to Fridays at 10 p.m. EST, a timeslot the show would remain at until its cancellation in 1999.

The third season saw all the original cast members return except for Jon Polito (playing Steve Crosetti), who was reportedly dropped at the request of NBC. Season 3 also marked the debut of character Lt. Megan Russert (Isabella Hofmann), and the final season for both Detectives Beau Felton (Daniel Baldwin) and Stanley Bolander (Ned Beatty).

Celebrities who made guest appearance during the third season include Al Freeman Jr., Steve Buscemi, Tim Russert, Howie Mandel and Chris Noth. As with the previous seasons, Season 3 had several episodes air out of order resulting in continuity issues. To make up for this, the episodes "Crosetti" and "Nothing Personal" included title cards in the beginning to tell the viewers the episodes took place in the past. Season 3 also saw the first crossover between Homicide and Law & Order as Chris Noth makes a cameo appearance as Detective Mike Logan in the episode "Law & Disorder".

The DVD box set of season 3 was released for Region 1 on October 28, 2003. The set includes all 20 season 3 episodes on six discs.

== Episodes ==
When first shown on network television, multiple episodes were aired out of the order in which they were produced. The DVD of this season presents the episodes in their correct chronological order, restoring all storylines and character developments.

No. overall	No. in season	Title	Directed by	Written by	Original release date	Prod. code	U.S. viewers (millions)
14	1	"Nearer My God to Thee"	Tim Hunter	Story by : Tom Fontana & Jorge Zamacona; Teleplay by : Jorge Zamacona	October 14, 1994	301	11.0
New Shift Commander Megan Russert heads the Redball investigation of the murder of "Samaritan of the Year", Catherine Goodrich. Due to the political volatility of the case, Lieutenant Al Giardello and his shift are called in to assist the investigation. Detective Beau Felton and his wife separate, leaving Detective Kay Howard to deal with the fallout. Detectives Meldrick Lewis and John Munch look within their ranks for a third person to buy a local tavern. First appearance of Lt. Megan Russert
15	2	"Fits Like a Glove"	Ted Demme	Story by : Tom Fontana & Julie Martin; Teleplay by : Bonnie Mark	October 21, 1994	302	10.9
A second white glove victim is found behind a church. Primary Detective Roger Gaffney allows a possible murder scene to be compromised, so Russert throws him out of Homicide and puts Pembleton on the case. Later a serial murder groupie, Frederik Fuchs, shows up and gives the squad a lead on the investigation. Felton continues to wrestle with the possibility of reconciling with his wife. An indiscretion in Detective Tim Bayliss' past jeopardizes Lewis and Munch's ability to buy the tavern.
16	3	"Extreme Unction"	Keith Gordon	Story by : Tom Fontana & James Yoshimura; Teleplay by : D. Keith Mano	October 28, 1994	303	10.9
As Pembleton digs deeper into the serial murder investigation a witness, "Pamela" Wilgis, suddenly emerges. While Pembleton questions her, Bolander checks her apartment and uncovers a link to the case. Pembleton closes in on a confession, only to be interrupted by a startling discovery. Later, a statement given by Wilgis on live television undermines Pembleton's faith in the system, himself, and God.
17	4	"Crosetti"	Whitney Ransick	Story by : Tom Fontana & James Yoshimura; Teleplay by : James Yoshimura	December 2, 1994	304	10.2
The squad is shocked when Lewis' longtime partner Steve Crosetti, who was thought to have been on vacation, is found dead in the Inner Harbor. Bolander, the primary on the case, gathers proof that it's a suicide, but Lewis initially believes otherwise and interferes with the investigation in the hopes of changing the outcome. As the squad prepares for the funeral, the brass tells Giardello that there will be no honor guard for Crosetti due to the nature of his death. Pembleton, still struggling with his own issues of faith, finds his own way to honor the departed detective. (NOTE: Though intended by the producers to follow the episode "Extreme Unction", this episode was aired after "A Model Citizen", where Lewis made a jarring reference to Crosetti's death. An opening title card stating "One day last October..." informs the viewers that this episode takes place in the past.)
18	5	"The Last of the Watermen"	Richard Pearce	Tom Fontana & Henry Bromell	December 9, 1994	305	10.1
When Howard and Felton are summoned to a grisly crime scene, Howard snaps and heads home to the Eastern Shore. Back home, she's soon investigating the murder of a local conservationist. Howard suspects a local oysterman may be involved. She soon finds herself investigating friends, family, and her old flame Chick Tawes. Back in Baltimore, Giardello assigns Pembleton as Felton's temporary partner. To their shock and amazement, they work well together and come to an understanding.
19	6	"A Model Citizen"	John McNaughton	Story by : Tom Fontana & Jorge Zamacona; Teleplay by : Noel Behn	November 11, 1994	306	9.3
Sparks fly when Lewis meets his dream girl, police artist Emma Zoole, who only has eyes for Bayliss. Munch and Howard investigate the shooting of a teenager by his brother. The experience compels Munch to take some action as a volunteer. When the department, Pembleton, and Russert are sued by Annabella Wilgis for violating her civil rights, her action pits Pembleton and Russert against one another. Felton comes home from his shift to find that his wife has emptied the house and disappeared, taking the children with her.
20	7	"Happy to Be Here"	Lee Bonner	Story by : Tom Fontana & Julie Martin; Teleplay by : Julie Martin	November 18, 1994	307	9.3
Munch and Bolander investigate the murder of Sam Thorne, a journalist crusader and good friend of Giardello. Bayliss and Pembleton look into the death of an elderly woman who has been decaying in her house for two weeks. Felton continues his search for his family and confronts Howard and Russert, looking for answers to his situation. Bayliss' ongoing relationship with Emma Zoole causes a further rift between himself and Lewis and throws his personal life into turmoil.
21	8	"All Through the House"	Peter Medak	Henry Bromell	December 16, 1994	308	10.9
It's Christmas Eve and the squad is on duty. Munch and Bolander investigate the death of Nicholas McGibney, a streetside Santa Claus. When they go to the victim's residence, they find his 10-year-old son Fidel, who's waiting for his dad to come home. Bolander checks with Child Welfare, leaving Munch to deal with the child. Lewis and Russert, meanwhile, spend the evening trying to find a young woman's killer, and Bayliss tries to hustle his colleagues in cards during a quiet night in the squad room.
22	9	"Nothing Personal"	Tim Van Patten	Story by : Tom Fontana & James Yoshimura; Teleplay by : Bonnie Mark	April 21, 1995	309	11.2
Crosetti's caseload is finally reassigned to the detectives and Howard's 100% clearance rate may be in jeopardy when she gets his most difficult unsolved case. Giardello's difficult personal life turns volatile when he believes that he has been discriminated against by a friend of Russert's. Felton looks to Russert for comfort when his wife decides not to bring the children home and he loses a piece of key evidence critical to Howard's unsolved case. Bayliss, Munch, and Lewis close the deal on the bar only to find that their troubles are just beginning. (NOTE: An opening title card states "Six weeks after the death of Det. Crosetti", to inform the viewer that this episode takes place in the past. With production code 309, this episode was scheduled to air nearly four months earlier, so that events seen in this episode do not acknowledge the shootings of Howard, Felton, and Bolander, the full takeover of the tavern by Munch, Lewis and Bayliss, nor Russert's promotion to captain.)
23	10	"Every Mother's Son"	Kenneth Fink	Story by : Tom Fontana & James Yoshimura; Teleplay by : Eugene Lee	January 6, 1995	310	12.9
Pembleton and Bayliss investigate the shooting of a 13-year-old boy, Darryl Nawls. During the course of their investigation, the mother of the shooter unknowingly meets the mother of the victim and finds that they have much in common. Past events wreak havoc on Munch and Lewis' plans to remodel and open the bar. Felton continues searching for his estranged wife and kids.
24	11	"Cradle to Grave"	Myles Connell	Story by : Tom Fontana & Jorge Zamacona; Teleplay by : David Mills	January 13, 1995	311	12.2
Lewis and Munch investigate the death of Andrew "Monk" Whetherly, a member of the Deacons Motorcycle Club. Whetherly's wife, Bree, leads them to Preacher, the gang's warlord, who says Monk was killed "because he loved his little girl." The case is further complicated when Lewis is approached by an FBI Agent who is also investigating the Deacons. Monk's wife and child are taken into protective custody. Deputy Commissioner James Harris enlists Pembleton to help cover up a Congressman Wade's false reporting of a crime, but denies involvement and throws Pembleton to the wolves when a reporter unearths the cover-up. Frustrated, Pembleton quits, but returns to the department in later episodes.
25	12	"Partners"	John McNaughton	Story by : Tom Fontana & Julie Martin; Teleplay by : David Rupel	January 20, 1995	312	11.4
Detective Douglas Jones, Russert's former partner, joins Homicide from Narcotics. When questioned by the prosecutor's office, the Deputy Commissioner denies any knowledge of Frank's cover up, though Giardello questions this. Without a partner, Bayliss is ordered to work a case with Lewis. Bayliss pleads with Giardello to talk to Frank, insisting that the squad needs to help him. Later, when Jones' wife Natalie is admitted to the hospital with suspicious injuries, Russert confronts Jones about possible spousal abuse. Pembleton prepares to testify against the Congressman, with his friendships and future in the department hanging in the balance. Bayliss, Lewis, and Munch finally open The Waterfront Bar.
26	13	"The City That Bleeds"	Tim Hunter	Story by : James Yoshimura & Bonnie Mark; Teleplay by : Julie Martin & Jorge Zamacona	January 27, 1995	313	14.0
Bolander, Munch, Howard, and Felton all meet to serve a routine warrant but are caught in an ambush when a gunman opens fire, critically wounding all but Munch. Pembleton is assigned as the primary in the investigation and is partnered with Detective Theresa Walker, who specializes in the psychology of their prime suspect, a pedophile. Bolander's ex-partner Mitch Drummond from the bomb squad offers his help on the investigation. Part one of three.
27	14	"Dead End"	Whitney Ransick	Story by : James Yoshimura; Teleplay by : Julie Martin & Jorge Zamacona	February 3, 1995	314	13.1
Working with the Quick Response Team, Pembleton and Bayliss close in on the pedophile and suspected sniper, Glen Holton. Felton wrestles with his guilt over Howard's condition, as does Bolander's ex-wife, who arrives in Baltimore. Captain George Barnfather and Colonel Bert Granger tell Russert to review Giardello's actions on the day of the shooting to determine if he was negligent in his duties. A shocking admission from an apprehended suspect has unforeseen consequences on the investigation. Part two of three.
28	15	"End Game"	Lee Bonner	Story by : James Yoshimura & Henry Bromell; Teleplay by : Rogers Turrentine	February 10, 1995	315	14.4
The investigation into the detective shootings leads to a new prime suspect, Gordon Pratt (Steve Buscemi). Conclusion.
29	16	"Law & Disorder"	John McNaughton	Story by : James Yoshimura & Henry Bromell; Teleplay by : Bonnie Mark & Julie Martin	February 24, 1995	316	13.2
Bayliss is met with hostility when he has to question his colleagues after Pratt is found dead and finds out no one is interested in helping him solve the case.
30	17	"The Old and the Dead"	Michael Fields	Story by : Henry Bromell & Jorge Zamacona; Teleplay by : Randall Anderson	March 3, 1995	317	13.4
Howard and Bolander return to duty, eager to put the shooting behind them and get back to closing cases. However, Howard's rhythm is thrown off due to her desk being moved, while Bolander has become irritable and has trouble sleeping. Felton teams with Bayliss to investigate a skeleton dug up in a backyard in a Billytown neighborhood of southwest Baltimore. Giardello stumbles across corruption in the department's upper levels, leading to a forced resignation and a surprise promotion to captain - that goes to Russert. Guest star: Tim Russert as himself/cousin of character Megan Russert Note: In the pre-credits scene, Russert appears in a captain's dress uniform, though she does not get the promotion until the second half of the episode.
31	18	"In Search of Crimes Past"	Kenneth Fink	Story by : Henry Bromell & Julie Martin; Teleplay by : Jane Smiley	April 14, 1995	318	11.1
A desperate young woman takes Colonel Barnfather hostage and demands that Bolander reopen a 16-year-old murder case that put her father on death row. Lewis investigates a suicide that proves to have a surprising connection to this case, while Pembleton and Bayliss try to find answers concerning an old woman found dead in her own bathtub. Munch hires a new bartender (Jerry Stiller) who has some unusual ideas for drumming up business at the Waterfront.
32	19	"Colors"	Peter Medak	Tom Fontana	April 28, 1995	319	11.1
Bayliss' cousin Jim shoots and kills a Turkish exchange student who shows up at his front door looking for a party. When Pembleton investigates, he uncovers evidence suggesting that Jim may have acted out of prejudice against foreigners. Tension rises between Pembleton and Bayliss as the case goes to the grand jury. Meanwhile, Lewis tries to revive the restaurant end of the Waterfront's business by hiring a new cook: his grandmother. Guest Star: David Morse as Jim Bayliss
33	20	"The Gas Man"	Barry Levinson	Story by : Tom Fontana and Henry Bromell; Teleplay by : Henry Bromell	May 5, 1995	320	10.9
Released from prison after serving six years, a vengeful ex-con targets Pembleton, whom he blames for putting him there and ruining his life. He stalks Pembleton and Mary all day long, determined to harass and humiliate them both before finally deciding to kill Pembleton. Final appearances of Det. Beau Felton and Det. Stanley Bolander

== Cast ==
For the third season of Homicide, almost all the original cast members, including Daniel Baldwin, Ned Beatty, Richard Belzer, Andre Braugher, Clark Johnson, Yaphet Kotto, Melissa Leo, & Kyle Secor, returned. Jon Polito was the only original cast member not to return as NBC reportedly requested that he'd be dropped from the show due to their unhappiness with his physical appearance; Polito's character, Steve Crosetti, would be written out as having gone on vacation to Atlantic City only to commit suicide upon his return to Baltimore. According to an interview in 2005, Polito claimed that when Tom Fontana called him to tell him he was being dropped, he promised Polito would return in the future. However, after Polito refused to believe Fontana and began criticizing the show, the plans were dropped. In the same interview, Polito expressed regret for his comments:.

We had some conflicts on the show. I was also not in the best of shape: I was feeling very passionately about the show, and I was very annoyed about NBC's—what NBC was doing with it. I was very passionate about it. I stepped on the wrong toes. And I made a major mistake. I did not know at the time that Tom Fontana—when Tom Fontana tells you, "You have to be dropped now, but I'll bring you back"—I didn't believe that because I'd been screwed by so many producers over the years. He is a serious man when he says that. I didn't know that. I didn't trust him. So after he said, "NBC wants to get the girl on the show, and they have to replace somebody, and we're gonna choose you, but I'll bring you back in the fall," I instead, very stupidly, went to the newspapers. And I said, rather openly, I said some very vicious comments, both about the way it was being handled by NBC and the way Fontana and Levinson were handling listening to NBC. I was totally wrong because, in fact, the changes they made meant that NBC put it on a better night, and it became a success. But aside from that, I was wrong to jump at Fontana and all that, and not believe in Fontana and Levinson, because they're great people and would've been faithful to me, but I just didn't trust it because I'd been screwed too many times before. I actually said in one newspaper, "The producers of the show are like the people on the Titanic," and the writer said, "You mean they're the captain of the ship?" and I said "No, no. They're on the iceberg saying, 'This way. Come this way.'" That's in print and that was wrong.

Isabella Hofmann debuted as Lt. (later Captain) Megan Russert. Hofmann was hired reportedly at the request of NBC (specifically Warren Littlefield), who wanted more female characters on the show. Megan Russert was the fictional cousin of NBC Meet the Press moderator Tim Russert and was the first main character not to be based on an officer from the book Homicide: A Year on the Killing Streets. Daniel Baldwin and Ned Beatty both left the show at the conclusion of the season, reportedly due to failed contract negotiations. Both Baldwin and Beatty expressed dissatisfaction with the changes made during the third season, with Baldwin specifically claiming the Beau Felton and Megan Russert extramarital affair was "Typicial TV chicanery". Baldwin was also burnt out on NBC, saying: "I'd rather do small parts in movies."

Beatty, meanwhile, was frustrated with having to turn down other roles, including the musical Show Boat, due to Homicide, which itself had an uncertain future. Like Baldwin, Beatty also hated the changes made during the third season. Beatty was quoted in the Los Angeles Times:

It wasn't about the money. I loved it in the beginning. Some of it was the best thing I've ever done. But it got to the point where they wanted to see people get shot and car chases and all that. Which is not something homicide detectives do.

Neither would return for the duration of the series; however, both would return for Homicide: The Movie in 2000.

Celebrities who made guest appearances included Al Freeman Jr., who played Deputy Commissioner James C. Harris in "Cradle to the Grave", Steve Buscemi who played Gordon Pratt, the suspect who shot detectives Felton, Howard, & Bolander in "End Game". Tim Russert appeared as himself in "The Old and the Dead". Chris Noth appeared as his Law & Order character Detective Mike Logan in "Law & Disorder", which marked the first time that Homicide and Law & Order crossed over.

== Reception ==
=== Ratings ===
Ratings for Season 3 were much lower than the first season. The show ranked at #89 with estimated audience of 8,200,000 which was a drop compared to Season 1 which finished at #24 with an estimated audience of 12,717,000

=== Awards ===
The third season of Homicide was the only season to have no Emmy nominations. Despite this, the show did win a Viewers for Quality Television award and a Peabody Award while Andre Braugher won a VQT award for Best Actor in a Quality Drama Series. The show was also nominated for a Writers Guild of America Award for Best Episodic Drama for the episode "Fits Like a Glove".
