= Kay Howard =

Detective/Sergeant Kay Howard
- Det./Sgt. Katherine 'Kay' Howard
- First appearance: January 31, 1993 (1x01, "Gone for Goode")
- Last appearance: May 16, 1997 (5x22, Strangers and Other Partners") (HLOTS); February 13, 2000; Homicide: The Movie
- Created by: Tom Fontana
- Portrayed by: Melissa Leo

In-universe information
- Nickname: Howie
- Gender: Female
- Title(s): Sergeant; Detective
- Occupation: Fugitive Squad Sergeant; Homicide Sergeant (Formerly); Homicide Detective (Formerly)
- Family: Wesley Howard (father); Carrie Howard (sister); Josh Howard (brother)
- Nationality: American

Katherine "Kay" Howard is a fictional character in the American television series Homicide: Life on the Street. She was played by actress Melissa Leo. In the first two seasons of the show her character was the only female detective or member of the main cast. However, NBC president Warren Littlefield felt that the lack of other female characters was alienating the audience, so Megan Russert was added to the show. It was stated in a special edition of Homicide: A Year on the Killing Streets, the non-fiction book that the show was based on, that the character of Kay Howard was based on Baltimore Police detective Rich Garvey. Howard is also influenced by Detective Bertina Silver, referred to as 'Bert' by her colleagues, thought by many in the unit to be the exception to the 'Secretaries-with-guns' female officer stereotype. The end result of the real-life influences was that Howard combined Garvey's superb and persistent work and sky-high clearance rate and Silver's complete acceptance by the male-dominated Homicide unit (which was not the case with all real-life female cops, nor amongst female cops over the run of the series).

== Early and family life ==
In the Season 3 episode "The Last of the Watermen", Howard visits the small coastal oyster fishing town of Tilghman Island, Maryland where she was brought up. Her father and her brother Josh still live there. She also has a sister, Carrie, who appeared in a Season 4 episode (also played by Leo, under the pseudonym Margaret May).

== Professional life ==
Having been a homicide detective since April 1991, Kay was generally portrayed as a tough female detective. She is not entirely hardened by her job, however, and at times expresses disbelief that seemingly good people can do terrible things. As a detective she is thorough, realistic, and generally has among the highest clearance rates in the squad. Her high rate of success is important to her as she feels that, as the only woman in the department, she needs to prove herself. Megan Russert would later chide her for this tendency. Despite her generally rational approach, Howard occasionally indulges in magical thinking, feeling that some things "transcend" logic. This includes varied superstitions, which she displays at work, and the idea that the ghost of a victim had aided her in solving a case.

During Season 3, she and fellow detectives Stanley Bolander and Beau Felton are shot while trying to serve an arrest warrant on a suspect. Howard is struck in the heart, but eventually makes a full recovery and returns to work. Her family comes in from the coast to visit her in the hospital; her father is especially concerned over how little information the doctors are willing to share.

In the Season 4 premiere, Howard passes a promotion exam and is elevated to Sergeant. Most of her fellow detectives had encouraged her to go up for the position, but on actually assuming the role she becomes alienated from them. This happens in part because she seems at first to "micromanage" them, and also simply because her new position changes her relationship with them. Her friendship with Det. Meldrick Lewis, for example, grows especially stormy after she is promoted.

== Personal life ==
Howard guards her private life jealously, but is less consistent on this in the first two seasons. Prior to joining the homicide department, she had an affair with Lt. Jimmy Tyron, who was married. Tyron would later be arrested for shooting C. C. Cox in the back while fleeing. In the first season, she agrees to a date with ASA Ed Danvers, and by the second season the couple go on a double date with Det Stanley Bolander and his new girlfriend. Her relationship with Danvers is strictly sexual, and ends at an unspecified point in the third season of the show. After breaking up with Danvers, she becomes far more reticent about personal matters to avoid being the subject of office gossip.

It was implied in the fourth season that her intense privacy, combined with her toughness and style change to masculine clothing, had led to some speculation that she might be a lesbian; upon seeing Kay with a mystery date, Det John Munch said as much, although this may have just been a tactic to get her to tell him who the man is. The DVD commentaries for the show reveal that the producers were aware that the character was extremely popular in the LGBT community.

She is generally "one of the team", although her being female was occasionally remarked upon by the squad. The crime scene photographer J. H. Brodie expressed his infatuation with her, but due to a miscommunication she felt his expression of affection was a way to make fun of her. Det. Mike Kellerman also stated she was attractive "because of the hair." In certain episodes she expressed concern about her sister and gender issues. In general she dislikes both being deemed masculine and being treated "like a lady."

== Final season ==
Season 5 saw her character relegated to some degree, but also showed important developments. For example, she is surprised by how emotional she becomes when her former boyfriend Danvers gets engaged. In a later episode in the season, Danvers' fiancee is murdered, which hits Howard nearly as hard as it does Danvers. In addition, her former partner Beau Felton is murdered in Season 5. In Season 6, Howard is transferred to the Fugitive squad, and decides to remain there. The character is not seen again until Homicide: The Movie, when she joins the current and former Homicide detectives to search for Gee's attacker.
