= Jay Landsman =

American actor

- Born: Baltimore, Maryland, U.S.
- Children: 4
- Police career
- Department: Baltimore Police Department; Baltimore County Police Department
- Rank: Lieutenant
- Other work: Television actor

Jay C. Landsman is an American retired homicide detective and actor. He was featured in David Simon's 1991 book about the Baltimore homicide unit Homicide: A Year on the Killing Streets. According to the book, Landsman was the last of his family line on the Baltimore Police Department. His brother Jerry was a detective in the agency who left in the 1980s and their father was the department's first Jewish district commander.

== Acting career ==
The book was later developed into the television series Homicide: Life on the Street. He was the inspiration for the fictional character John Munch on that show, and was portrayed by Delaney Williams on the television series The Wire, created by Simon. Landsman portrayed himself in a brief appearance on the HBO miniseries The Corner and, later, appeared in The Wire, playing the character of Lieutenant Dennis Mello, interacting with the fictionalised version of himself portrayed by Williams. He appeared in season five of the food and travel show No Reservations, when host Anthony Bourdain stopped in Baltimore on a tour of America's rust belt.

== Police career ==
Landsman's family's work in police and fire departments goes back generations. His father, Lt. Charles "Buck" Pfaff, was killed in a fire truck accident on Park Heights Avenue in 1949.

In December 2015, Landsman was promoted to lieutenant in the Baltimore County Police Department. Landsman retired from the city's police force in 1994, when he joined the county. In 2004, he and his son Jay C. Landsman Jr. were simultaneously promoted from corporal to sergeant in the department. By 2015, Landsman Jr. was a captain, having commanded Precinct 6 since April 2014, and by September 2017- when he was appointed Commander of the Technical Services Division at Baltimore County Police Headquarters- a Major.

As of March 2016, by which time he was a Lieutenant in the Pikesville precinct, all four of Landsman's children were serving with him in the Baltimore County Police Department, as was one granddaughter. His nephew, Richard Landsman, also served in Baltimore as a Lieutenant, as did other members of the Landsman family.
