= Stanley Bolander =

Stan Bolander
- Homicide: Life on the Street character
- Det. Stanley 'Stan' Bolander
- First appearance: January 31, 1993 (1x01, "Gone for Goode")
- Last appearance: May 5, 1995 (3x20, "The Gas Man)" (HLOTS); February 13, 2000; Homicide: The Movie
- Created by: Tom Fontana
- Portrayed by: Ned Beatty

In-universe information
- Nickname: (The) Big Man
- Gender: Male
- Title: Detective
- Occupation: Retired; Homicide Detective (formerly)
- Spouse: Margie Bolander (divorced)

Stanley 'Stan' Bolander is a fictional character in the American crime drama / police procedural Homicide: Life on the Street. He is portrayed by Ned Beatty and appears in the first three seasons and the spinoff film Homicide: The Movie.

== Character overview ==
Stanley Bolander was born on July 6, 1944, in North Hampden, Baltimore, Maryland. Throughout his time on the show, he is partnered with Det. John Munch. It is generally agreed that Bolander is based on Donald Worden, one of the Baltimore Homicide Department detectives featured in the non-fiction book Homicide: A Year on the Killing Streets, on which the series was based.

The other members of the squad affectionately refer to Bolander as "The Big Man", a name also used by Worden's colleagues to refer to him in the book. In the fourth-season episode "Scene of the Crime", Munch explains to Mike Kellerman that the nickname has to do with aspects other than Bolander's weight: "He is in all senses a man of magnitude – enormously fair, tremendously honest, and a whale of a detective."

== Personality ==
Bolander has been a homicide detective since 1968 – indeed, he is the most experienced (and almost certainly, the oldest) officer in Lt. Al Giardello's homicide squad. He is a gruff and taciturn man, quick to irritation and not particularly fond of expressing his feelings. This masks a certain degree of insecurity and vulnerability, however; at the beginning of the show, he had recently divorced from his wife and was still coming to terms with this change in his life, especially as his wife asked for the divorce on the advice of a therapist they were seeing, neither having consulted with him first.

He is also artistic and gentle, displaying a fondness and ability for the cello. In the infrequent occasions after his divorce when he is in love, he displays a remarkable joy and lust for life that not even the investigation into a suicide can dampen. His age and marital status would also seem to allow him to identify with his lieutenant more than the other younger members of the squad, and vice versa. Despite his often bad tempered persona, Bolander has also expressed a certain fondness for children and seems to regret not having any of his own.

Not much is known of his early life, but in the episode "The Old and the Dead" he stated his father was a stevedore who occasionally took him to work so he could watch the boats. However, since he told this bit of personal information to a young suspect in "the box", it might not be true. He remarks to John Munch in the pilot that he is from the Hampden neighborhood of Baltimore. Bolander supports the Baltimore Orioles and often wears a scarf in the team colors (black and orange) during cold weather; he also thinks fondly of the Baltimore Colts before their move to Indianapolis.

== John Munch ==
Bolander's most significant relationship in the squad room is with his partner, John Munch. The two share something of a love-hate relationship; being drastically different in temperament, the two manage to tolerate each other at best, and are frequently found bickering with each other for rather petty reasons. The more intellectual, liberal Munch is usually guaranteed to rub his surly, taciturn partner up the wrong way with his various eccentricities, philosophies and conspiracy theories. Numerous times during their partnership, Bolander indicates that he appreciates Munch more than he lets on, and at times would appear to have the younger detective's best interests at heart. In the Law & Order: Special Victims Unit episode "Trials", Munch called Bolander his mentor.

== Retirement ==
In Season 3, Bolander and fellow detectives Kay Howard and Beau Felton were shot while trying to serve an arrest warrant on a suspect. Bolander was the most critically injured, taking a bullet to the head. Once he returned to work, he became even more withdrawn and melancholy than before, and wore a hat at all times to cover the long surgical scar on his scalp. While attending a police conference in New York, he and Felton caused an embarrassing disturbance and were suspended for 22 weeks; the start of this punishment coincided with the start of Season 4, marking both characters' departure from the show. When Bolander's suspension ended, he chose not to return to work and instead retired with his pension – a decision that greatly upset Munch, who was looking forward to meeting him at the Waterfront Bar.

He was next seen in Homicide: The Movie where it is implied that he had developed something of a drinking problem, but he also says his health has improved thanks to a no-salt diet which he loathes.

He returned to help catch Giardello's shooter and—much to his mortification—was once again paired with Munch.
