= Beau Felton =

Beauregard D. 'Beau' Felton
- Det. Beauregard Donald 'Beau' Felton
- First appearance: January 31, 1993 (1x01, "Gone for Goode")
- Last appearance: May 5, 1995 (3x20, "The Gas Man") (HLOTS); February 13, 2000; Homicide: The Movie
- Created by: Tom Fontana
- Portrayed by: Daniel Baldwin

In-universe information
- Nickname: Beau
- Gender: Male
- Title: Detective
- Occupation: Undercover Cop for IID (formerly); Homicide Detective (formerly)
- Family: Zack Felton (son); Alley Felton (daughter); Unnamed baby
- Spouse: Beth Felton (widow)

Det. Beauregard Donald 'Beau' Felton is a fictional character on the television drama series Homicide: Life on the Street portrayed by Daniel Baldwin for seasons 1-3. He was loosely based on Det. Donald Kincaid, from David Simon's nonfiction book, Homicide: A Year on the Killing Streets, on which the series was based.

Beau Felton was born on October 22, 1960. He is a hardheaded tough guy from Billytown, in the southwest area of Baltimore. His main squad partner in the series is Det. Kay Howard. The two of them are friends, and their discussions that there is no sexual tension between them are later affirmed when he stays at her place as a purely platonic roommate, after his marriage breaks down.

Felton is married to Beth Felton, though by the beginning of the series their marriage is on the rocks. They have three young children—a boy, Zack; a girl, Alley; and an unnamed baby—to whom Beau is very close. Beth, who is emotionally unstable, eventually empties out their house in the third season, disappears with the children, and does as much as she can to prevent him from seeing his children. When Lt. Megan Russert is introduced in the first episode of the third season, Felton is already having an affair with her, although she breaks it off very soon after. When Beth leaves, Felton begins to drink heavily and his police work suffers as a result; Howard becomes disgusted with him following a binge in which he loses crucial evidence for a seemingly unsolvable case, assigned to her from the late Steve Crosetti's caseload.

In spite of an office dress code, Felton never wears a tie unless required to for a special occasion like testifying in court; Homicide executive director Barry Levinson said this was a "big character point" for Felton.

During a raid in the third season episode "The City That Bleeds", Felton is shot, along with Det. Howard and Det. Bolander. Beau is wounded in the neck and leg, but the bullets miss all major organs and arteries; Howard and Bolander, meanwhile, are far more seriously injured. Felton is the first to recover, though he carried a lot of the guilt over Howard being hit. He is the first to go back on duty, but his recovery, coupled with Beth leaving him for good, worsens his drinking problem. After Felton loses his temper over a minor incident, and blames it on his recovery, Lt. Al Giardello bluntly tells him he had never been good enough for Homicide, even before he was shot, citing Felton's drinking and personal problems.

Due to unsuccessful contract negotiations with actors Daniel Baldwin and Ned Beatty, Felton and Bolander were written out of the series after Season 3.

The narrative reason for the characters' absence is given in the Season 4 premiere, in which Giardello reveals that Felton and Bolander got drunk and engaged in embarrassing and grossly inappropriate behavior while attending a police/firefighter convention in New York City. Both are suspended for 22 weeks without pay, a reference to the then-standard length of a network drama's TV season. Bolander chooses to retire when his suspension is up, while Felton drops out of sight. During Season 5, Giardello often complains about Felton's unknown whereabouts, and rumors began to spread that he had resigned in disgrace following his suspension.

In the two-part season finale of Season 5 ("Partners and Other Strangers" and "Strangers and Other Partners"), Felton is found dead in his house, a shotgun blast having destroyed most of his skull. The evidence first points to suicide, but M.E. Julianna Cox soon determines that he had been murdered with a pistol shot to the back of the head; the killer then used the shotgun to stage the suicide. He was murdered on May 9, 1997.

Giardello soon learns that Felton had actually returned from his long suspension to an offer to work undercover for Internal Investigations Division (IID), under the direction of Detective Stuart Gharty. The Homicide detectives are disgusted that the cowardly Gharty had chosen to remain on the force, earned a promotion from Patrolman to Detective, and been put into a leadership position within IID. He further shocks them by revealing that Felton had offered to work for IID because he would have preferred to quit the BPD rather than return to Homicide. Felton had been undercover for six months helping IID and the FBI build a case against a massive auto theft ring, but an information leak led to his cover being blown. He was personally murdered by the auto kingpin, who managed to evade capture. Beth wants nothing to do with Beau's funeral, so Howard and Russert handle the arrangements. A memorial for Felton is established in the police headquarters, and attended (on screen) by then-Maryland Governor Parris Glendening and then-Baltimore Mayor Kurt Schmoke.

The investigation of Felton's murder leads the detectives to remember moments with Felton, although most of these memories prove unpleasant, and Al Giardello regrets that he ignored a few in-suspension phone calls from Felton and helped cause the chain of events that led to his murder. The episode illustrates these memories with flashbacks consisting of brief clips from the first three seasons; these clips are Felton's only appearance on the series after Season 3.

The last appearance of Felton was in the 2000 TV movie Homicide: The Movie, where he and (Season 3 deceased) Detective Crosetti are seen in the afterlife playing cards in the squad room and waiting for the next "arrival" – who turns out to be Al Giardello.
