= Gary D'Addario =

American police officer and actor

- Born: Baltimore, Maryland, United States
- Police career
- Country: United States
- Department: Baltimore Police Department
- Service years: 1967 - 2004
- Other work: Television actor, technical advisor

Gary D'Addario is an American retired police commander, television technical advisor and actor from Baltimore, Maryland.

D'Addario joined the Baltimore police department in 1967. An Italian-American, D'Addario advanced in the department easily during the days of the BPD's brief "Holy Roman Empire", the time period from 1981–1984 under former Commissioner Frank Battaglia where Italian-American police officers of Baltimore briefly controlled the previously Irish-American dominated department. D'Addario served as a shift lieutenant in the Baltimore Police Department homicide unit for 10 years during his career. He was a captain in 1998 and was promoted to major in 2003. He retired at the rank of major in 2004, when the 37-year veteran of the department was forced to retire by new Commissioner Kevin P. Clark as part of Clark's unpopular turnover of veteran command staff.

It was in his capacity as a homicide shift lieutenant that he became one of the subjects of David Simon's non-fiction book about the homicide unit, Homicide: A Year on the Killing Streets. Simon followed D'Addario's shift within the unit for a year and wrote an account of their activity.

The book was adapted into an NBC television series called Homicide: Life on the Street and D'Addario inspired the character Al Giardello on that series. D'Addario had a recurring role on Homicide as Lt. Jasper, head of the Quick Response Team. He also worked as a technical advisor on Homicide primarily as a source on the Baltimore Police Department and a liaison between the production and the department. Simon later moved from writing books to television and became a writer and producer for the series. D'Addario was a technical advisor for Simon's next project, the Emmy Award-winning miniseries The Corner, and had a small role as a desk sergeant.

D'Addario served as a technical advisor on the first two seasons of Peabody Award-winning The Wire. The Wire was also created by Simon. D'Addario had a recurring role as the gambling-addicted grand jury prosecutor Gary DiPasquale in The Wire. Simon has speculated that D'Addario's first appearance on the series in the season 2 episode "Undertow" coincided with his forced retirement. Simon wrote to Mayor Martin O'Malley to ask if there was any link and seeking confirmation that other city employees did not risk losing their jobs by appearing on the series and received no response. D'Addario stood down as technical advisor because he was no longer part of the police department but continued to appear on the show until its conclusion.
