= Homicide: A Year on the Killing Streets =

1991 book by David Simon

- Author: David Simon
- Language: English
- Genre: Crime
- Publisher: Houghton Mifflin
- Publication date: June 1991
- Publication place: United States
- Pages: 608
- ISBN: 0-395-48829-X
- OCLC: 23356235
- Dewey Decimal: 363.2/59523/097526 20
- LC Class: HV8148.B22 S54 1991

Homicide: A Year on the Killing Streets is a 1991 non-fiction book written by Baltimore Sun reporter David Simon describing a year spent with detectives from the Baltimore Police Department Homicide Unit. The book received the 1992 Edgar Award in the Best Fact Crime category.

The book was subsequently fictionalized as the NBC television drama Homicide: Life on the Street (1993–99), on which Simon served as a writer and producer. Many of the key detectives and incidents portrayed in the book provided inspiration for the first two seasons of the show, with other elements surfacing in later seasons as well. It later also provided inspiration for Simon's HBO television series The Wire (2002–08).

== Background ==
David Simon, a reporter for The Baltimore Sun, spent four years on the police beat before taking a leave of absence to write this book. In 1988, he persuaded the Baltimore Police Department to allow him access to the city's Homicide Unit, and throughout that year he shadowed a shift of detectives as they investigated cases, conducted interrogations, executed search and arrest warrants, and testified at trials. Baltimore recorded 234 murders during the year Simon spent with the Homicide Unit.

A total of 567 murders occurred in the city in 1989 and 1990, the period during which Simon wrote Homicide. The book was published in 1991, during which Baltimore saw a record 353 murders. Simon said he was particularly interested in the "demythification" of the American detective. Although detectives are typically portrayed as noble characters who care deeply about their victims, Simon believed real detectives regarded violence as a normal aspect of their jobs.

== Content ==
Homicide: A Year on the Killing Streets provides a sympathetic but unromantic portrait of crime fighting in a major American city at the height of the late 1980s crime epidemic. The book is notable for the detailed look it gives into the professional lives of police detectives and the mix of quirky, absurd, and sometimes tragic cases they investigated.

=== Notable cases ===
==== Latonya Wallace ====
The case of Latonya Kim Wallace, an 11-year-old girl who was sexually assaulted and murdered, is perhaps the most notable case in the book. Tom Pellegrini was the primary detective on the case, which remains unsolved. The Adena Watson case in Homicide: Life on the Street was based on this case, and the travails on it of new Detective Tim Bayliss were based on Pellegrini's experiences. Simon described it as "the spine of the book".

==== Geraldine Parrish ====
A woman named Geraldine Parrish took out life insurance policies on multiple relatives, including her five husbands and a niece, then arranged for their murders so she could collect the benefits. She eventually pleaded guilty to four murders and was convicted of three assaults, receiving eight life sentences without parole.

Donald Waltemeyer was the primary on this case, which played a large role in his transition from the mindset of patrol officer to that of investigator. His experiences involved two attempts to locate and exhume a Parrish victim, both of which ended with the wrong man being disinterred. The case of Calpurnia Church in the first season of Homicide: Life on the Street was based on Parrish's crimes.

==== Gene Cassidy ====
Gene Cassidy, a patrolman and close friend of Detective Sergeant Terry McLarney, was shot twice in the head at point-blank range in October 1987. Although initially expected to die or be left completely disabled, Cassidy made a full mental recovery but was left blind and without his sense of smell or taste. Drug dealer Clifton "Butchie" Frazier was eventually convicted of attempted murder in the first degree and sentenced to life in prison plus 20 years. McLarney felt a great deal of disillusionment by the way that the BPD seemed unable to understand or fully help Cassidy in the aftermath of the shooting.

The Cassidy story was worked into the first season of Homicide: Life on the Street and was the largest storyline for the character of Detective Steve Crosetti (Jon Polito). Officer Chris Thormann (Lee Tergesen), a friend of Crosetti, was shot and blinded while on duty; Crosetti took the incident personally and went to great lengths to find the shooter. The case also inspired the character of Blind Butchie on The Wire, a blind Baltimore drug dealer who was soft-spoken and not vicious (a contrast to the real-life Butchie Frazier).

Actions by the jury during Frazier's trial became the basis for a Season 4 storyline in which Bruce Campbell played a cop whose father, a retired officer, was strangled to death by a suspect who was acquitted by an uninterested jury. A passage in Simon's book revealed that the guilty verdict against Frazier came about because two jurors who were convinced of his guilt argued more strenuously to bring the jury to their side than did two who believed he was innocent, while the other eight had no strong opinion either way.

Gary Tuggle, an officer seconded to the homicide unit to help with the investigation, went on to serve in the Drug Enforcement Administration. He returned to Baltimore in March 2018 to take the post of Deputy Police Commissioner, and was then appointed Interim Commissioner two months later, serving until March 2019.

==== John Randolph Scott ====
Car thief John Randolph Scott was fatally shot in the back while fleeing on foot from officers. Only one pursuing officer fired his weapon, and the bullet was found embedded in the dirt of a nearby vacant lot. With no clear murder weapon and no cooperation from the other officers on the scene, Detective Donald Worden was unable to close the case, making it the only unsolved police-related shooting in department history. The book notes that several officers, including a primary suspect, were reassigned to administrative positions.

Minor friction resulted between Worden and his sergeant, McLarney, on this case. A civilian suspect was a possibility, but the exposure of this development by a reporter shut down that investigative alley, and infuriated Worden and Rick James, his partner, as they knew that information could only have come from a police officer.

This story was worked into a Homicide: Life on the Street story in which Detective Frank Pembleton investigated a police-involved shooting. Unlike the real case, the fictional story ended with a police officer being arrested and charged with the shooting.

=== The "Homicide Lexicon" and its rules ===
Throughout the book, Simon frequently refers to 10 informal rules that apply in the majority of homicide cases, as detectives soon learn. They are as follows:

1. Everyone lies. Murderers lie because they have to; witnesses and other participants lie because they think they have to; everyone else lies for the sheer joy of it, and to uphold the general principle that under no circumstances do you provide accurate information to a cop.
2. The victim is killed once, but a crime scene can be murdered a thousand times.
3. The initial ten to twelve hours after a murder are the most critical to the success of an investigation.
4. An innocent man left alone in an interrogation room will remain fully awake, rubbing his eyes, staring at the cubicle walls, and scratching himself. A guilty man left alone in an interrogation room goes to sleep.
5. It's good to be good; it's better to be lucky.
6. When a suspect is immediately identified in an assault case, the victim is sure to live. When no suspect has been identified, the victim will surely die.
7. First, they're red. Then, they're green. Then, they're black. (Referring to the color of an open case on the board, the money that must be spent to investigate the case, and the color of the solved murder as it is listed on the board)
8. In any case where there is no apparent suspect, the crime lab will produce no valuable evidence. In those cases where a suspect has confessed and been identified by at least two eyewitnesses, the lab will give you fingerprint hits, fiber evidence, blood typings, and a ballistic match.
9. To a jury, any doubt is reasonable; the better the case, the worse the jury; a good man is hard to find, but 12 of them gathered together in one place is a miracle.
10. There is indeed such a thing as a perfect murder. Always has been, and anyone who tries to claim otherwise merely proves himself naïve and romantic, a fool who is ignorant of Rules 1 through 9.

== Detectives ==
David Simon joined the Baltimore Police Department as a "police intern" in January 1988 and spent 12 months following the homicide detectives of Lieutenant Gary D'Addario's shift. At the beginning of the year, the shift consisted of the following personnel:

- Lieutenant Gary D'Addario – Shift Commander
  - Detective Sergeant Terrence McLarney – Squad Supervisor
    - Detective Donald Worden ("The Big Man")
    - Detective Rick James
    - Detective Edward Brown
    - Detective Donald Waltemeyer
    - Detective David John Brown
  - Detective Sergeant Roger Nolan – Squad Supervisor
    - Detective Harry Edgerton
    - Detective Richard Garvey
    - Detective Robert Bowman
    - Detective Donald Kincaid
    - Detective Robert McAllister
  - Detective Sergeant Jay Landsman – Squad Supervisor
    - Detective Tom Pellegrini
    - Detective Oscar "Rick" Requer ("The Bunk")
    - Detective Gary Dunnigan
    - Detective Richard Fahlteich
    - Detective Fred Ceruti

Edward Brown and David John Brown were not related, though at one point David jokingly referred to Edward as his father.

Fahlteich and Ceruti both transferred out of the unit during the year; they were replaced by Detectives Vernon Holley and Chris Graul.

=== The Wire ===
Several detectives described in the book were the basis for characters on the Baltimore-based HBO drama The Wire:

- Jay Landsman spawned a character of the same name, and the real-life Landsman portrayed real life police named Dennis Mello.
- Rick "The Bunk" Requer was the basis for Detective Bunk Moreland, and in episode four of season five Roscoe Orman played a veteran named Oscar "Rick" Requer.
- Gary D'Addario appears as a Prosecuting Attorney Gary DiPasquale on the show, who assists Detective Moreland with various grand jury summonses.
- Roger Nolan, Terry McLarney and Donald Worden are briefly mentioned as officers in various episodes, and Worden makes a cameo appearance as himself in the fifth season.
- A 1970s contract killer named Dennis Wise is also briefly mentioned, and Dennis "Cutty" Wise is a major character in the series.
- Another name used for a character was Roger Twigg, a police reporter who, in the book, is characterized as an annoyance to law enforcement. When the Monroe Street investigation yielded a potential civilian lead, Twigg published an article calling the civilian a potential suspect; although the description was technically true, police believed that the man only witnessed the crime. He subsequently invoked his Fifth Amendment right against self-incrimination and refused to testify, blocking that avenue of the investigation.

Additionally, several traits of various officers can be viewed amongst the characters on the show, and much similar slang is used on the show such as the words "Dunker", "Redball", and "Stone Whodunit" to describe the various cases. Moreover, the police department on the show has the same red/black case clearance and marking criteria.

Finally, a number of small anecdotes in Homicide: Life on the Street worked their way into The Wire:

- Most notably, the tale of "Snot Boogie", a small-time thief who was shot down after a craps game, was used in the cold open of the series' first episode, providing the "This America, man" quote.
- When listing the detectives whom he sees himself and the rest of the VCU as being on a par with, McNulty mentions Worden, Ed Burns (who was a homicide detective but was detailed with the FBI for the year), and Gary Childs, a detective on the other shift in the book.

=== Aftermath ===
Gary D'Addario

Lieutenant Gary D'Addario rose to the rank of major commanding the Northeastern District of the Baltimore Police Department. The 37-year veteran of the department was forced to retire by new Commissioner Kevin Clark in 2004, as part of Clark's unpopular turnover of veteran command staff. D'Addario had guest appearances as QRT Lieutenant Jasper in Homicide: Life on the Street, as a Desk Sergeant in the HBO mini-series The Corner, and as a Grand Jury State's Attorney on the HBO drama The Wire.

Jay Landsman

Sergeant Jay Landsman retired from the Baltimore Police Department and joined the Baltimore County Police Department. Landsman worked as an actor playing Lieutenant Dennis Mello in HBO's The Wire. Delaney Williams plays a character called Sergeant Jay Landsman in the same show. Landsman's son Jay Jr. also works as a county homicide detective working out of Precinct 4 in Pikesville, Maryland.

Donald Waltemeyer

Detective Donald Waltemeyer retired from the Baltimore Police Department and joined the Aberdeen Police Department. He died of cancer in 2005, aged 58, and was posthumously promoted to Detective Sergeant.

Roger Nolan

Detective Sergeant Roger Nolan became the founder and longtime supervisor of the department's Cold Case Squad and retired a day before his 70th birthday in 2009. He died on February 2, 2023, at the age of 83.

Donald Kincaid

In the book, Kincaid's disputes with fellow Det. Harry Edgerton and Sgt. Roger Nolan were outlined; Kincaid hated Edgerton's approach to the job and an argument with Nolan over this led to Kincaid first transferring to another BPD shift and then retiring in 1990. While the Harlem Park Three case that Kincaid was the primary detective on is briefly mentioned, in the context of a prison encounter between one of the three teenagers convicted of murdering a middle-school student, it was not a main focus of the book because it was (at the time) an uncontroversial closure that happened outside of the year of Simon's coverage. In 2019, the convictions were vacated, Kincaid's professional actions were heavily criticized, and the exonerated men received tens of millions of dollars in legal settlements.

Donald Worden

Detective Donald Worden retired from police work in 1995 but was subsequently re-hired as a civilian contractor to work with the squad.

Tom Pellegrini

Detective Tom Pellegrini, then 49, retired from the Baltimore Police Department in 1999 after 20 years of service, only to join the United Nations Interim Administration Mission in Kosovo (UNMIK) police force in Kosovo, in October 1999. Pellegrini later worked as a private investigator with Sherwood Investigators based in Severn, Maryland. He also served as the chief of police in White Hall, West Virginia, and died at the age of 76 on October 22, 2025.

Richard Fahlteich

Detective Richard Fahlteich rose to the rank of major. He retired in 2004, but answered the Police Commissioner's request to return to duty that year as commander of the Baltimore Police Department Homicide Unit. He retired in 2006, after 32 years with the Department. He died at the age of 78 on January 13, 2023.

Terry McLarney

Detective Sergeant Terry McLarney is still in the Baltimore Police Department, now holding the rank of major in the Homicide Section. He spent years of exile in the Western, "where he was banished after his shift commander [not D'Addario, whom he considered a friend] politely declined an invitation to fisticuffs". McLarney began to serve as acting commander of the Homicide Section in May 2008 and was officially named to the post that July. In June 2011, McLarney was replaced as commander.

== Slang ==
The book details a number of slang terms used by the city's homicide detectives.

- Billy – Derogatory term (short for hillbilly) that can apply to "white trash" or "redneck" males and females, specifically those with roots in Appalachia and their descendants. As with blacks, "billies" do not include those with decent jobs, such as Worden or Kincaid, and Simon suggests that the two discriminations are more class-based. One typical description is that "Billies do not reside in Baltimore, they live in Bawlmer."
- Billyland – Area of South Baltimore inhabited by "billies" (see above).
- The Board – A dry erase board in the squad room. Every squad sergeant's name is at the top of a column, followed by a list of the cases their detectives are investigating; each entry consists of a number, the victim's name, and a letter indicating which detective is the primary investigator on the case. Open and closed cases are listed in red and black, respectively. This allowed supervisors to quickly assess the productivity of each shift/squad/detective and acted as motivation for detectives. "The Board" was discontinued in 1998 due to public relations and morale concerns, but restored in 2000 at the detectives' request. Closed cases from previous years are written in blue ink, as noted briefly in the afterword regarding Worden's current work on cold cases, "putting blue names on the Board". The show followed this convention as well, though the layout of "the Board" was different: each shift used one full side, with a separate column for every detective on the shift in alphabetical order and an extra column to list suspects for whom arrest warrants had been issued.
- Bunk/Bunky – A term of affection (short for "bunk mate") typically applied to friends and co-workers. McLarney regards McAllister as "my bunky", while Requer is known as "the Bunk". The veteran cops in the Southern District think of Waltemeyer in this way, since he was assigned there during his time as a patrol officer, and readily help him find a car used by a murder suspect. The term is also used sarcastically towards suspects.
- Citizen/Taxpayer – A "real" murder victim, as opposed to a drug dealer or gang member murdered in the course of criminal activity.
- Dunker – An easily cleared case (from the basketball term slam dunk). An example from the book: a husband arrested while standing over his wife's dead body, covered in her blood, telling cops he killed her and would do so again if he got the chance.
- Dying declaration – A statement made by a dying person who can speak and identify their attacker, and definitely knows they are dying. However, useful declarations are rare; instead, they tend to become the stuff of homicide legend. For example, one man, dying from a gunshot, "assured detectives that he would take care of the matter himself". Garvey solves a case using a dying declaration in the book.
- Eyefuck – To look at someone disrespectfully or in anger. A ceremonial eyefuck occurs in the book when an unrepentant criminal is convicted. Garvey is disappointed when one criminal, convicted for two brutal murders, does not follow this tradition, describing him as "no fun at all".
- Jake – A semi-derogatory term for a Jamaican-American.
- Number One Male – Police radio description for an African American male suspect. Number Two is for a White suspect, Number Three is for a suspect of another race. Numerical order is most likely based on either Baltimore's African American majority or on African Americans' being the most common criminal suspects in Baltimore, in the eyes of the BPD.
- Polygraph-by-Copier – A folk tale in police circles in which detectives use a photocopier as a faux-polygraph machine on a particularly dumb suspect. Pages are loaded into the machine with "TRUE" or "LIE" on them, and questions are asked to match them. ("What is your name? Truth. And where do you live? Truth again. And did you or did you not kill Tater, shooting him down like a dog in the 1200 block of North Durham Street? Lie. Well, well: You lying motherfucker."). This was used in an episode of Homicide: Life on the Street, and in a Season 5 episode of The Wire. A story from the book notes that several cops in Detroit were punished for using this technique during interrogations.
- Put down/Clear – To close a case, either by arresting a suspect or establishing that the perpetrator is dead.
- Red ball – A high-profile case that draws media and political attention. Red ball cases are investigated by all detectives on a shift and take precedence over existing active cases. They can and often do make or break a detective's career. They are also known as "shitstorms," "clusterfucks," and "murders that matter." Examples during the book include the Latonya Wallace case (Pellegrini's first assignment as primary detective) and the Scott police-involved shooting. Red balls also include major cases that usually fall outside the jurisdiction of the homicide unit, such as non-fatal police-involved shootings and high-profile abductions.
- Secretaries with guns – Derogatory term typically used for incompetent female detectives. There are some exceptions to this rule, e.g., Jenny Wehr and Bertina "Bert" Silver.
- Smokehound – Derogatory term for a drunk.
- Squirrel – A criminal, a suspect, a rodent. Typically too cooperative during interrogations.
- Stone Whodunit – A difficult case.
- Ten-Seven – police radio code for "out of service"; may be applied to a homicide victim.
- Ten-Seventy-Eight – Police radio code invented by McAllister to refer to "your basic blowjob-in-progress interrupted by police gunfire". This occurs twice in the course of the year, though only one is described in detail.
- Toad – A derogatory term for Blacks, specifically those who have or had a criminal history. Not usually applied to Black policemen such as Sgt. Nolan or Detectives Brown, Edgerton, or Requer, or law-abiding Blacks who hold other legitimate jobs.
- Yo – A derogatory term for Blacks, often applied to male teenagers and young adults in place of a name. Like "toad," it is not applied to those with legitimate jobs and good social standing.
- Yoette – A young black female. Unlike "yo," the term does not have any criminal or derogatory connotations.

== Reception ==
Homicide: A Year on the Killing Streets won the 1992 Edgar Award for Best Fact Crime book. The Associated Press called it "a true-crime classic". The Library Journal also highly recommended it, and Newsday described it as "one of the most engrossing police procedural mystery books ever written".

== Translations ==
- Dutch: Homicide: Een jaar achter de schermen van de afdeling moordzaken, lit. 'Homicide: A Year Behind the Scenes of the Homicide Unit'. Translated by Meile Snijders. Amsterdam: Ambo|Anthos Uitgevers. 2009. ISBN 9789026321979.
- German: Homicide: Ein Jahr auf mörderischen Straßen. Translated by Gabriele Gockel, Barbara Steckhan and Thomas Wollermann. Munich: Verlag Antje Kunstmann. 2011. ISBN 9783888977237.
- French: Baltimore, lit. 'Baltimore'. Translated by Héloïse Esquié. Paris: Editions Points. 2013. ISBN 9782757832950.
- Chinese: 凶年; pinyin: Xiōng nián; lit. 'Bad Year'. Translated by Xu Zhanxiong. Shanghai: Shànghǎi sānlián wénhuà chuánbò yǒuxiàn gōngsī. 2015. ISBN 9787542650849.
- Spanish: Homicidio: Un año en las calles de la muerte. Translated by Andres Silva. Barcelona: Editorial Principal de los Libros. 2015. ISBN 9788416223251.

== See also ==
Books:

- The Corner: A Year in the Life of an Inner-City Neighborhood, also by David Simon
- Cop in the Hood: My Year Policing Baltimore's Eastern District, by Peter Moskos
- Tokyo Vice, by Jake Adelstein

General:

- Crime in Baltimore
