= Tom Fontana =

American writer and producer (born 1951)

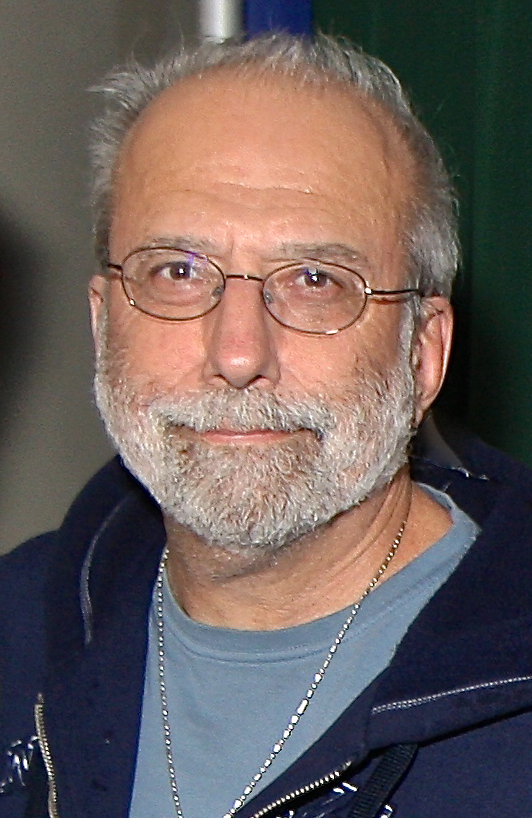
- Fontana at the Montclair Film Festival in 2014
- Born: September 12, 1951 (age 74); Buffalo, New York, U.S.
- Education: Buffalo State College
- Occupations: Screenwriter, playwright, producer
- Spouses: Sagan Lewis (m. 1982; div. 1993) (m. 2015; died 2016)
- Children: 1

Tom Fontana (born September 12, 1951) is an American screenwriter, writer, and television producer. Fontana worked on NBC's Homicide: Life on the Street and created HBO's Oz.

== Early life and education ==
Fontana was born on the west side of Buffalo, New York, and is the fourth of five children in an Italian-American family; he is a cousin of actress Patti LuPone. He attended Cathedral School, Canisius High School, and Buffalo State College. He worked at the Studio Arena Theater in Buffalo in various capacities before moving to New York City in 1973.

== Career ==
=== Television ===
Having started out as a playwright, Fontana was hired by Bruce Paltrow as a writer for St. Elsewhere. Fontana has been the creator/showrunner for Oz, Copper, The Jury, The Beat, The Bedford Diaries, The Philanthropist, Monsieur Spade and he was also the showrunner on Homicide: Life on the Street and City on a Hill.

Fontana wrote the HBO film Strip Search, directed by Sidney Lumet, and contributed two pieces to the September 11 special, America: A Tribute to Heroes. He was the executive producer of American Tragedy for CBS, Shot in the Heart for HBO Films, the independent film Jean, and the documentary The Press Secretary for PBS. Fontana also created the historical drama TV series Borgia for the French premium-pay channel Canal+, produced by Atlantique Productions and EOS Entertainment. The series recounts the Borgia family's rise to power and subsequent domination of the Vatican during the Renaissance. Fontana also co-created Copper, an 1860s police procedural set in the turbulent Five Points neighborhood of New York.

Fontana has received three Emmy Awards, four Peabody Awards, three Writers' Guild Awards, four Television Critics Association Awards, the Cable Ace Award, the Humanitas Prize, an Edgar Award, and the first prize at the Cinéma Tout Ecran Festival in Switzerland. In 2003, Fontana was the recipient of the Austin Film Festival's Outstanding Television Writer Award.

=== Articles ===
Fontana has written articles for such periodicals as The New York Times, TV Guide, and Esquire, and has taught at Columbia, Syracuse, Rutgers, and the State University College at Buffalo, his alma mater, from which he received the Distinguished Alumni Award and an honorary Doctorate of Letters.

=== Plays ===
Fontana has had numerous plays produced in New York City, where he lives, and at San Francisco's American Conservatory Theater, the Cincinnati Playhouse in the Park, the Buffalo Studio Arena Theatre, Williamstown Theatre Festival, and McCarter Theatre Company.

=== Podcasts ===
Fontana wrote, directed and produced the podcast Sugarland for Audible.

== Personal life ==
Fontana was married to actress Sagan Lewis for 12 years until their divorce in 1993. Sagan and Fontana remarried on July 10, 2015, and remained together until her death on August 7, 2016.

Fontana has a tattoo of the Oz logo on his upper right arm, which he is shown receiving in the opening credits of the series.

Fontana does not own or use a computer, and writes all of his scripts longhand on a yellow legal pad.

== Membership ==
He is a member of the Dramatists Guild, the Producers Guild of America, and the Writers Guild of America, East, from which he received the Evelyn F. Burkey Award for lifetime achievement. Fontana served as vice president of the Writers Guild of America, East from 2005 to 2007. He is president emeritus of the WGAE Foundation, commonly known as the Writers Guild Initiative, and serves on the boards of the Acting Company, the Williamstown Theatre Festival, DEAL, the New York City Police Museum, and Stockings with Care, among others.

Detective Joe Fontana, Dennis Farina's character on Law & Order, was named for Tom Fontana, who became close friends with Law & Order creator Dick Wolf while working as writers in the same building, at the same time, on the series St. Elsewhere (Fontana) and Hill Street Blues (Wolf).

== Filmography ==
=== Film ===
Year	Title	Credited as		Notes
Year	Title	Writer	Producer	Notes
1985	The Fourth Wise Man	Yes	Yes	
1993	New Year	Yes	Yes	
1996	The Prosecutors	Yes	Yes	
1997	Firehouse	Yes	Yes	
2000	Homicide: The Movie	Yes	Yes	
2004	Judas	Yes	Yes	
2004	Strip Search	Yes	Yes	

=== Television ===
Year	Title	Network	Credited as			Notes
Year	Title	Network	Creator	Writer	Producer	Notes
1982-1988	St. Elsewhere	NBC	No	Yes	Yes	
1988-1989	Tattingers	NBC	Yes	Yes	Yes	Co-created with Bruce Paltrow and John Masius
1992	Home Fires	NBC	Yes	Yes	Yes	Co-created alongside Bruce Paltrow and John Tinker
1993-1999	Homicide: Life on the Street	NBC	No	Yes	Yes	Showrunner
1997-2003	Oz	HBO	Yes	Yes	Yes	Creator/Showrunner
2000	The Beat	UPN	Yes	Yes	Yes	Creator/Showrunner
2004	The Jury	Fox	Yes	Yes	Yes	Co-created alongside Barry Levinson and James Yoshimura/Showrunner
2009	The Philanthropist	NBC	Yes	Yes	Yes	Co-created alongside Charlie Corbin and Jim Juvonen /Showrunner
2012-2013	Copper	BBC America	Yes	Yes	Yes	Co-created with Will Rokos/Showrunner
2011-2014	Borgia	Canal+	Yes	Yes	Yes	Creator/Showrunner
2019-2022	City on a Hill	Showtime	No	No	Yes	Showrunner
2024	Monsieur Spade	AMC & Canal+	Yes	Yes	Yes	Co-creator/Co-showrunner with Scott Frank
