= James Robson (Oz) =

Fictional TV character

- Oz character
- First appearance: The Tip (episode 2.01)
- Last appearance: Exeunt Omnes (episode 6.08)
- Created by: Tom Fontana
- Portrayed by: R.E. Rodgers

In-universe information
- Title: ID 97R492
- Occupation: Prisoner

James Robson is a fictional character in the television series Oz, portrayed by R.E. Rodgers. Originally, Robson was supposed to appear in only one episode ("The Tip") and then never to be seen again. However, series creator Tom Fontana was impressed by Rodgers, so Robson became a regular from the third season to the final episode.

== Character overview ==
"Prisoner #97R492: James Robson. Convicted November 7, 1997 - Murder in the first degree, assault. Sentence: Life, up for parole in 25 years."

The son of Gerald Robson, he is a sadistic racist, Robson is imprisoned for murdering a black man who he saw walking home with his girlfriend. In Oz, Robson acts as Vernon Schillinger's main lieutenant and is one of the most savage members of the Aryan Brotherhood. He is highly regarded by Schillinger until a dentist tells Robson that he had implanted the gums of an African-American into Robson's mouth. Once word gets around, Schillinger casts Robson out of the Brotherhood even though Robson cuts the skin grafts out of his mouth. Without the protection of the Brotherhood, Robson does whatever is necessary to survive, becoming Wolfgang Cutler's sex slave so that Cutler would protect him. Along with Shirley Bellinger and Moses Deyell, Robson is never housed in Emerald City, and is the only one of the three to survive the series.

During his time in the series, Robson is the main enforcer of the Aryans and takes a sadistic pleasure in committing horrific acts of violence and sexual abuse against weaker inmates. Robson is however seen as the weakest and most cowardly member of the Aryans when he is up against stronger inmates. He is hospitalised numerous times over the series for instigating conflict and fights. He also has the ability to get under people's skins, one example mocking Omar White for being Kareem Said's slave. His time as Cutler's slave changes him, however, and at the climax of the series he begins to feel some remorse for his actions.

=== Season 2 ===
In 1997, Robson is forced to bunk with his current cellmate, Peter Vinyard, as well as Tobias Beecher and Bob Rebadow, since Emerald City had transferred all of its inmates over to his cell block after the riot that occurred at the end of the first season. Robson tries to force Beecher to perform fellatio on him, but Beecher turns the tables on him by biting off the tip of his penis.

=== Season 3 ===
Robson reappears, this time as a full-fledged member of the Aryan Brotherhood inside of Oz. He serves little purpose in season 3 other than following Schillinger's schemes and encouraging him to do whatever he needs to do to maintain the power of the Brotherhood. After the death of Scott Ross and Mark Mack he becomes Schillinger's lieutenant in the aryan's. He also participates in Oz's boxing tournament, as the Aryans' representative. He faces Cyril O'Reily, but unbeknownst to him, Cyril's older brother Ryan had spiked Robson's drinking water with chloral hydrate (stolen and smuggled from the prison hospital) to make sure Cyril wouldn't lose. Robson, incapacitated by the drug, loses the fight.

=== Season 4 ===
For the first half of the season, Robson is mainly seen as a supporter of Schillinger and the rest of his Aryan brothers, aiding in whatever plot he could. In the latter half, however, he slowly evolves into a more significant character. When Schillinger begins to spend more time with Christian leader Jeremiah Cloutier, Robson temporarily runs the Aryan Brotherhood's business, gradually becoming disillusioned with his former mentor.

He is thrown into solitary confinement after getting in a fight over a joke that the Muslims overheard. Robson blames Muslim leader Kareem Said, and forms an alliance with Black inmate Leroy Tidd, who also hates Said for killing his friend, Simon Adebisi. The two plot to kill Said. Tidd pretends to convert to Islam to get close to Said. However, when Tidd's conversion becomes genuine, he pulls out of the plan. Robson then bullies a younger inmate named Carl Jenkins into killing Said by promising to initiate him into the Brotherhood, as well as threatening to sell him as a sex slave to the Black inmates if he fails. Jenkins kills Tidd instead when Tidd protects Said, and is thrown into solitary confinement. Cloutier, on Said's behalf, approaches Jenkins and convinces him to give up Robson as the man who ordered the murder. Jenkins does so, but later commits suicide for fear of the Aryans' retaliation. Since prison authorities have no testimony against Robson, he is released from solitary and cleared of the charge. He then enrages Said by taunting him about the deaths of Tidd and Jenkins. Said beats Robson unconscious, further escalating the war between the Aryans and the Muslims.

By this time, Schillinger has resumed running the Brotherhood, much to Robson's relief. The war worsens when the Muslims protect Beecher, Schillinger's longtime enemy, when he comes up for parole. When Robson and Schillinger taunt Beecher for losing his parole, Said shanks both of them. They both end up in the hospital with severe stab wounds and deepened rancor toward Beecher and Said.

=== Season 5 ===
Both Robson and Schillinger return to Oz after recovering from their wounds, ready to take revenge. The war is put on hold, however, when Schillinger participates in interaction sessions with Said, Beecher, and Sister Peter Marie to help prevent more violence. When Schillinger finds out that Chucky Pancamo, leader of the Sicilians, had his son Hank killed, he goes after them, and Robson himself shanks Pancamo, putting him in the hospital. Later, Peter Schibetta attempts to stab Schillinger. Schibetta is beaten and gang-raped by Robson, Schillinger, and another Aryan who simultaneously taunt Schibetta with racial slurs and references to his rape by Adebisi. Causing another breakdown where he is sent to psych.

Soon afterward, two new White inmates, Franklin Winthrop and Adam Guenzel, arrive in Oz to serve time for raping a college girl. They are young, scared, and weak, and the Aryans use this weakness to their advantage. In Unit B, the Aryans save Winthrop from being raped by an overweight Black inmate named Clarence Seroy — only to keep him as their sexual slave. After parading Winthrop in drag, Robson tells Beecher he would rape Guenzel (a family friend). Beecher then enlists the Italians to protect Guenzel. In the gym, Robson tries to rape Guenzel, but Frank Urbano defends him and puts Robson in the hospital. He sees Pancamo who is still recovering from his stab wound and taunts him, Pancamo can only watch and is prevented from making a move on him by the staff. Schillinger manipulates Guenzel into turning against Beecher, who then retracts his protection. Robson then kills a young Muslim named Ahmad Lalar with the help of another Aryan inmate.

When Robson visits the infirmary, prison dentist Dr. Tariq Faraj tells him that he has gum disease and needs new gums grafted from a cadaver. Robson hurls racial slurs at the Pakistani dentist, but agrees to the surgery. After the surgery, however, Faraj takes revenge by telling Robson that his new gums are from a Black man. Panicked, Robson asks Schillinger for advice, and Schillinger confers with the outside leader of the Aryan nations. The two leaders conclude that, if in fact Robson received these gums, then he is to be cast out of the gang, as he is no longer considered "pure". Faraj secretly pays Black inmate Arnold "Poet" Jackson to spread the word about Robson's gums, which actually are those of a Black man. In the cafeteria, Poet and Ryan O'Reilly, who hate Robson, announce to the entire prison population that Robson has "dirty ghetto gums" the inmates amused by this. Furious, Robson demands to know whose gums were put in his mouth and attacks Faraj, who, after hitting him in the mouth with a phone, lets him know he purposely used gums from a Black man for the transplant. Robson is put in solitary confinement and, as the outside Aryan Nation leaders learn where his new gums came from, Schillinger reluctantly kicks Robson out of the Brotherhood. After release from solitary, brotherhood members (physically and metaphorically) turn their backs on him refusing to associate.

Desperate to get back in, Robson buys heroin to use as an anaesthetic in an attempt to personally remove his new gums with a razorblade. The heroin turns out to be woefully inadequate as a painkiller, with Robson being almost immediately overcome with severe pain and bringing guards to his cell with his loud screams, and he is thrown once again into solitary confinement.

=== Season 6 ===
In the final season of Oz, Pancamo recovers from the shank wound Robson gave him and is released from the infirmary. With no allies to back him up, Robson now faces a grave threat from the Italians. He asks for protection from the Aryans, who refuse, except for Wolfgang Cutler, who agrees to protect Robson in return for Robson becoming his sex slave. After talking with Sister Pete, Robson reveals that he was raped by his father when he was six years old, and asks if it is acceptable to do "anything" to survive. Afterwards, Robson accepts Cutler's offer, and Cutler sodomizes him with a spoon. Cutler also forces him to dress in drag and perform bizarre sexual favors. In return, Cutler defends Robson (now his cellmate) from Pancamo. The Italians then offer Robson a deal: they will call a truce if he kills Cutler. Robson tells Sister Pete that Cutler is suicidal and then persuades Cutler to try auto-erotic asphyxiation. The next morning Cutler's body is found in his cell, hanging by a noose tied to the bunk bed. The authorities rule Cutler's death as a suicide.

Robson is allowed to re-enter the Brotherhood and now is free from both Cutler and the Italians, but his rape still haunts him. During a visit with his wife, he violently manhandles her to the point where she calls him a "cocksucker". Angered, Robson assaults her and ends up, once again, in solitary confinement. Remorseful, he goes to psychotherapy sessions and a rape support group. At the support group meeting, he learns from the other inmates, who all finish their stories of being violated with the phrase "I had no choice." He briefly recovers his equilibrium, but soon learns that he is HIV-positive. Department of Corrections standards mean that he is transferred to Unit F, the AIDS ward. Before he goes, he thanks the support group for helping him through the trauma and says that he initially blamed Cutler for his infection, but since he committed multiple rapes without protection, he now accepts that the responsibility is his.

In the extended version of the series finale, "Exeunt Omnes", Robson is shown once again allowing himself to be raped by Black inmate Clarence Seroy, knowing that Seroy will become infected. He then tells Schillinger that he will be transferred to the AIDS ward. As Seroy walks by them, he tells Schillinger that he raped Robson. Schillinger, disgusted that Robson would let a Black man rape him, throws Robson out of the Brotherhood for good, with Robson stating that he doesn't care and that not all of the inmates living in the AIDS ward are gay. Robson then tells Seroy to get tested because he might be HIV-positive. Angered, Seroy punches Robson before he is taken away by the COs. Robson then taunts a terrified Schillinger with his blood. He is later transferred out of Oz when the prison becomes contaminated by anthrax; meanwhile, Seroy learns he has been infected with HIV after raping Robson.
