= Cyril O'Reily =

Fictional character

Cyril O'Reily is a fictional character, played by American actor Scott William Winters, on the HBO drama Oz. He is also mentioned in the companion book Oz: Behind These Walls: The Journal of Augustus Hill.

== Character overview ==
"Prisoner #98P284: Cyril O'Reily. Convicted July 1, 1998 - Murder in the first degree. Sentence: Life, up for parole in 60 years."

Cyril was a hoodlum like his brother Ryan (who is actually his half-brother, as was revealed by Suzanne Fitzgerald). Cyril was Ryan's lieutenant and bodyguard in the Bridge Street Gang until he was injured in a fight, suffering brain damage. In the second season of Oz, Cyril murders the husband of Dr. Gloria Nathan on orders from his brother, who is in love with Dr. Nathan. Arriving in prison, Cyril is originally housed with Vernon Schillinger, head of the Aryan Brotherhood. After Schillinger rapes Cyril, however, Ryan gets his brother transferred to his own cell.

In the last season of the show, Cyril is executed despite Ryan's multiple attempts to save his brother, and despite Cyril's intellectual disability. Although Cyril is normally placid, he is prone to violent attacks on people when enraged, often showing great strength, which has earned him the resentment, but also the respect, of many inmates.

== Fictional history ==
=== Season 2 ===
Cyril O'Reily is the mentally handicapped brother of Ryan O'Reily, an Irish American sociopath serving time in Oz. He first appears when Ryan has surgery for breast cancer. Cyril is upset because their mother had died of cancer. After recovering, Ryan falls in love with Dr. Gloria Nathan, the prison doctor who helped save his life. Ryan feels that the only thing preventing a potential relationship with her is her husband, Preston, so he asks Cyril to murder him. Cyril does as he's told, and is sentenced to life in prison. Although Cyril is mentally disabled, he knows enough not to implicate Ryan in the crime as he worships his brother. Dr. Nathan and Unit Manager Tim McManus know that Ryan is responsible and demand that he confess, but Ryan says nothing and Cyril arrives in Oz.

When Cyril arrives in Oz he is put in Unit B, where he is approached by Aryan leader Vernon Schillinger, who promises to take Cyril to see Ryan. Schillinger instead takes him to a storage closet where he is gang raped by Schillinger and the other members of the Aryan Brotherhood. When Ryan realizes what has happened, he orders Cyril to assault him and as Ryan is hit, Officer Joseph Mineo takes Cyril to Ad Seg, isolated but safely away from Schillinger. Ryan cajoles McManus to bring his brother to Em City, but McManus refuses the move unless Ryan confesses to ordering his brother to kill Preston Nathan. After his release Cyril suffers terrible flashbacks and nightmares of being raped by Schillinger.

Later, a guard Eugene Rivera is blinded and needs a blood transfusion, and Ryan is the only person among both the inmates and officers with the same blood type. Ryan refuses to donate his blood unless his brother is moved to Em City. McManus arranges the transfer. Later, upon considering what Cyril's life in prison would be like without his brother to protect him, Ryan finally confesses to orchestrating the murder of Preston. Ryan's parole date is set back 40 years, but he can still protect Cyril from the other inmates, especially Schillinger.

=== Season 3 ===
Cyril starts off this season working in the kitchen and essentially shadowing his brother. The Aryan inmates, especially Schillinger and James Robson, taunt Cyril and Ryan continuously over the rape he suffered at Schillinger's hands. Ryan wants to kill Schillinger, but does not get a chance. Cyril goes to work early one day, against Ryan's wishes, and Robson tries to rape him. Cyril fights back, seriously hurting his would-be assailant. McManus wants to put Cyril in isolation, but new head CO Sean Murphy suggests that Cyril be let off with a warning. Murphy is Black Irish like the O'Reily brothers and understands that Ryan is trying to protect him. Murphy also helps McManus start the prison boxing tournament where each competitor represents one prison group. Ryan enrolls Cyril, who used to box before his injury, in the tournament to show everyone in Oz that Cyril is physically powerful.

In the first round, Cyril goes up against Robson. Ryan spikes Robson's water with drugs to ensure victory. Cyril wins the first fight against Robson in a knockout, and the Aryans leave off their taunts and threats afterward. Ryan spikes other boxer's drinks as well, as there is a lot of gambling money to be won. Ryan sees another opportunity to get back at the Aryans when Schillinger's heroin-addicted son Andrew arrives in Oz. Ryan, along with Cyril, Chris Keller and Tobias Beecher, who all have a vendetta against Schillinger, devise a plan to turn father against son. With Cyril as his bodyguard, Ryan sells drugs to Andrew then cuts him off, telling him that the only way he can buy drugs from now on is through the non-white inmates, something that the Aryan Brotherhood prohibits. Andrew eventually turns against his father, who bribes the guards to give him enough heroin to overdose. Cyril then fights in round two of the boxing tournament against Italian inmate Chucky Pancamo. Pancamo is the favorite to win, as he has more than 60 pounds on Cyril and is one of the most physically imposing inmates in Oz. Ryan spikes Pancamo's water, leading to a victory for Cyril, to the shock of the prison population.

Cyril is now in the championship round and must face Hamid Khan. Warden Glynn postpones the fight indefinitely, due to the racial tension that is building between Oz inmates, mainly between the Black Muslim and White Aryan inmates. Ryan and Khan convince Glynn to allow the fight, but Glynn stipulates that there would be no audience. Khan is encouraged by all the black inmates to kill Cyril while Cyril is encouraged to kill Khan by all the white inmates. In the meantime, Murphy discovers that Ryan has been spiking the fighters' water and threatens to expose him if he spikes Hamid Khan's water. Desperate to find a way to beat Khan, Ryan calls in their father, Seamus, whom he and Cyril despise, as a way to anger Cyril into a violent frenzy. Ryan then tells Cyril to use that anger to beat Khan who, like Pancamo, is an easy favorite. Cyril imagines Khan is their father and beats him into a coma. Cyril feels bad about hurting Khan, but Ryan tells him that it was necessary to survive inside Oz. Khan is hooked up to life support which creates animosity among the black inmates and ratchets the racial tension up to an all-time high. A near race riot breaks out, and Oz is locked down. Khan dies after his wife wins a lawsuit to take him off of life support.

=== Season 4 Part I ===
The lockdown ends and Cyril is having nightmares over Khan's death. Ryan suggests psychotherapy with prison psychologist "Sister Pete" Reimondo, who thinks interaction sessions with the families of Cyril's murder victims is the best way to clear his conscience. The only family willing to participate in the interaction sessions is the Nathan family. Sister Pete demands that Ryan participate as well, as he ordered Preston's murder.

In the interaction sessions, Cyril expresses his remorse and the Nathan parents express their anger. Ryan, however, turns the tables on the Nathans when he suggests that Gloria Nathan cheated on her husband during a temporary separation. As a result, the relationship between Dr. Nathan and Ryan becomes increasingly hostile. In Em City, Cyril is later attacked by inmates Leroy Tidd and Mondo Browne, who threaten to rape him. Cyril, however, beats the both of them and is then sedated with a large dose of Haldol by an angry Dr. Nathan. Ryan and Simon Adebisi, the leader of the Homeboys, then warn Tidd and Browne to stay away from Cyril. Dr. Nathan is raped in the meantime and she believes Ryan is responsible, punishing him by cutting off Cyril's treatment. With the help of Sister Pete, Ryan convinces Dr. Nathan that he wasn't responsible, and as a result she resumes Cyril's treatment.

In the midst of this, Em City is undergoing a demographic shift that worries Ryan, Chris Keller and some other white inmates. The new unit manager, Martin Querns, an African American, has empowered the Homeboys to do whatever they wish in exchange for enforcing a state of non-violence in Em City. Consequently, more and more black inmates and guards are transferred in, replacing their white and Latino counterparts. Claire Howell, one of the few white officers left, then develops a sexual relationship with Ryan which is discovered by Cyril. Concerned that Cyril will talk, Ryan brings Cyril to Sister Pete for counseling, telling her Cyril is "seeing things". Meanwhile, Ryan and Keller murder two inmates as a means of getting Querns fired and McManus reinstated. With the help of Muslim leader Kareem Said, they obtain videotaped evidence showing the prohibited behavior that the Homeboys are being allowed to commit, forcing Warden Glynn to fire Querns.

=== Season 4 Part II ===
In this half of the season, Cyril's violent behavior begins to worry the staff. First, reporter Jack Eldridge comes to Oz to do a news story. When Cyril and Ryan were younger, Eldridge wrote a story on Irish street gangs which depicted the O'Reily's gang as brutal and heartless. The story angered their mother Tess, who died of cancer shortly afterwards. Cyril recalls the incident and beats Eldridge severely; the story is subsequently quashed.

After Asian inmate Jia Kenmin arrives in Oz, disputes erupt between him and both the Irish and Latino factions. Kenmin provokes Cyril and Ryan to the point where Cyril loses control, beating the Asian man into a coma. McManus, angry and alarmed, considers transferring Cyril to the Connolly institute for the Mentally Unstable. Sister Pete, however, pushes him to send Cyril to Protective Custody for a while so that he can calm down.

Back in Em City, Ryan and new inmate Padraig Connolly, an IRA member awaiting deportation, plan to blow up Oz. The bomb is a dud, but Ryan leaves the gas leaking in the cafeteria which eventually detonates, destroying both Emerald City and the cafeteria.

Throughout the season, as Dr. Nathan finally falls for Ryan, she becomes somewhat more forgiving towards Cyril for killing her husband.

=== Season 5 ===
Ryan's birth mother Suzanne Fitzgerald turned herself in after being on the run with a radical group for more than 30 years. Governor Devlin however reduces her charges to 2 years of community service at Oz where she can see Ryan and Cyril. While Cyril was in Protective Custody, it was determined that he and Ryan were half-siblings with different mothers but Ryan and Suzanne keep this secret from him. They enjoy seeing her on a daily basis but this is short lived when Jia Kenmin and new Asian inmate Li Chen attend some of the performing arts classes. Jia offers peace to the two of them which Cyril accepts but Ryan remains cautious about. In an attempt to set up the O'Reily brothers, Kenmin pays inmate Glen Shupe to tell Ryan that Chen plans to rape Suzanne and as a result, he and Cyril attack Jia. Cyril picks up Ryan's knife which he drop during the fight and stabs Li Chen to death defending Ryan. Furious, Tim McManus sends Ryan to the cage and Cyril to solitary but not before stating that Cyril will either be sent to the insane asylum or death row as he is growing tired of Cyril's behavior. As Ryan is in the common room cage, Kenmin informs him it was a set up in order to eliminate the two brothers and taunts him. . On trial for murder, Cyril is represented by Katherine McClain who claims that she will do everything she can for Cyril but does not seem to be the best lawyer for this case. In a meeting with other family members to raise money for a better lawyer, Ryan, their Aunt Brenda, Suzanne, and abusive father Seamus decide that Cyril is better off dying than staying the rest of his life in Oz or a mental institution. A new inmate, Father Daniel Meehan, offers to help and riles up Sister Pete and some anti-death penalty activists to protest that sentencing a man in Cyril's mental state to death is cruel and unusual. Meanwhile, Ryan exacts revenge by getting the Latinos to injure Glen Shupe and manipulating the COs to kill Jia Kenmin. Cyril's trial does not go well and he is found guilty of murder in the first degree. When being transferred to Death Row, Cyril attacks Officer Len Lopresti and is then sedated by three additional COs. After a long talk with Father Meehan, Ryan finally agrees to protest Cyril's death by any means necessary.

=== Season 6 ===
In effort to overturn Cyril's death sentence Ryan, with the help of Sister Pete and Father Daniel Meehan, gets activist attorney Arnold Zelman to appeal his case. The appeals remonstrating the state's decision to kill a mentally handicapped person gather public support. In the meantime Sister Pete gives Cyril a hand puppet named Jericho whom Cyril speaks through with all his darker hidden thoughts. While speaking as Jericho, he uses his voice as it was before he became brain damaged rather than his present voice. In light of this disturbing behavior, Jericho is taken away from Cyril, who begins sobbing uncontrollably over the loss of his hand puppet. Cyril's crying angers Officer Lopresti, the supervising officer on death row who, with the other COs, spray Cyril down with a fire hose to shut him up. In the meantime, Governor Devlin, in an attempt to make Cyril appear normal, orders electroconvulsive therapy to be done to him. This angers Ryan, Suzanne, and others concerned with Cyril's well-being but they have no legal means of stopping the ECT treatment. Meanwhile, the appeals of Cyril's death sentence are not having any success and though protests continue, his execution date moves closer and closer. Originally, Ryan stated a preference for lethal injection as the means of execution for Cyril but, after speaking with Dr. Nathan, Ryan concludes that it will be easier for Cyril to undergo the electric chair and he explains this to Cyril in terms of having one last "Special" ECT session. At this time their father Seamus arrives in Oz for killing a man in a fight.

As Cyril's execution approaches, Oz's prisoners, led by prisoner Jahfree Neema, begin a protest. At the hour of Cyril's execution, Neema leads every inmate in Em City to tap on their cells. In the death room, while Cyril is being prepared to be electrocuted, his last statement to Warden Glynn is "Huh?". Right before the execution occurs, a 30-day stay is put in effect as new evidence is found in Cyril's case. Ryan then explains to Cyril that his session has been delayed. He is allowed to spend time with his brother during the days remaining before his new execution. As Cyril's final appeal fails, he is executed (he finally figures out what's going on as he is sitting in the chair once the black hood comes down, screaming for his brother- his last words being; "Mom! What's happening? Ryan? Ryan!"); as new warden Martin Querns watches, he throws up. After Cyril's death, Ryan and Seamus finally make peace.

=== ZO ===
Since Cyril's execution and the evacuation of Oz, the once close relationship between his brother Ryan and Tobias Beecher had deteriorated. During a phone call initiated by Ryan to have a verbal parry with Beecher, raw and emotional wounds are opened by Beecher mentioning Cyril and how people protested the cruelty of the electric chair. As the outrage came too late to help Cyril, the reminder is enough to knock Ryan off balance emotionally, showing that the memory of losing Cyril are still raw, compounded with the death of their father who died in prison before Ryan's release. Beecher also mentions that he still has drawings Cyril drew him, Beecher mocks Ryan by offering them to him, which O'Reily outright rejects, the phone call ends on bad terms.

== Analysis ==
Merri Lisa Johnson explains that one "of the few scenes in Oz to deal gently with prisoner rape comes when Cyril O'Reily, a developmentally disabled inmate who was also raped by Schillinger, talks with Gloria Nathan, the prison doctor....Cyril's diminished capacity allows him to innocently ask Nathan if she was on vacation because she was raped."
