= The Routine =

- Oz episode
- Dino Ortolani introduces Tobias Beecher to Emerald City
- Episode no.: Season 1 Episode 1
- Directed by: Darnell Martin
- Written by: Tom Fontana
- Production code: 101
- Original air date: July 12, 1997

Episode chronology
← Previous —	Next → "Visits, Conjugal and Otherwise"

"The Routine" is the pilot and first episode of the HBO prison drama television series Oz. Written by Tom Fontana and directed by Darnell Martin, it aired originally on July 12, 1997.

== Starring ==
- Ernie Hudson as Warden Leo Glynn
- Terry Kinney as Tim McManus
- Harold Perrineau, Jr. as Augustus Hill
- Eamonn Walker as Kareem Said

=== Also starring ===
- Kirk Acevedo as Miguel Alvarez
- Edie Falco as Correctional Officer Diane Whittlesey
- Leon as Jefferson Keane
- Rita Moreno as Sister Peter Marie Reimondo
- Tony Musante as Nino Schibetta
- J. K. Simmons as Vern Schillinger
- Lee Tergesen as Tobias Beecher
- Sean Whitesell as Donald Groves
- Dean Winters as Ryan O'Reily

=== Guest starring ===
- Adewale Akinnuoye-Agbaje as Simon Adebisi
- George Morfogen as Bob Rebadow
- muMs da Schemer as Arnold "Poet" Jackson
- Jon Seda as Dino Ortolani
- Jose Soto as Emilio Sánchez
- Desiree Marie Velez as Jeanie Ortolani
- Lauren Vélez as Dr. Gloria Nathan

=== Co-starring ===
- O. L. Duke as Paul Markstrom
- Goodfella Mike G as Joey D'Angelo
- Tim McAdams as Johnny Post
- Steve Ryan as CO Mike Healy
- Philip Scozzarella as CO Joseph Mineo
- Derrick Simmons as Billy Keane

== Plot ==
Augustus Hill, the series' narrator, introduces the audience to Cell Block 5 of the Oswald Maximum Security Penitentiary ("Oz"). Nicknamed "Emerald City" or "Em City," the experimental block is designed to rehabilitate select inmates by allowing them certain privileges in exchange for greater surveillance. The violence of Oz is demonstrated right away as new inmate Miguel Alvarez is shanked before even being brought inside, horrifying fellow arrival Tobias Beecher. The violence upsets Em City's unit manager, Tim McManus, who asks Warden Leo Glynn to allow the cannibalistic killer Donald Groves into Em City, believing no inmate is a lost cause. Glynn reluctantly agrees on the condition that drug dealer Paul Markstrom, his own wayward cousin, be brought there as well.

Correctional officer Diane Whittlesey assigns the arrivals to their "sponsors", veteran prisoners who at least nominally look after them and ensure they integrate appropriately. Groves is assigned the kindly Bob Rebadow; Markstrom's sponsor is Jefferson Keane, a fellow "Homeboy"; and Beecher is given Italian-American mobster Dino Ortolani. Ortolani is not interested in babysitting the anxious Beecher, but gives him basic pointers for surviving Oz. Glynn informs the inmates that cigarettes will be confiscated due to new state laws. Beecher is alarmed to find cellmate Simon Adebisi rifling through his possessions. Adebisi intimidates Beecher when he tries to stop it, and threatens to rape him at bedtime.

An unassuming-looking prisoner named Vernon Schillinger suggests that Beecher appeal to McManus to move out of Adebisi's pod, implying that Schillinger will gladly take Beecher into his own. Unfortunately, Beecher soon realizes Schillinger belongs to the Aryan Brotherhood and that he has just become Schillinger's "livestock." That night, Schillinger tattoos a swastika onto a petrified Beecher's buttocks. The following morning, McManus complains about the draconian laws passed by Governor James Devlin, saying that banning cigarettes will make the inmates uncooperative. Kareem Said, a radical black Muslim leader convicted of arson, arrives at Em City. Keane and Adebisi try to intimidate Said out of his anti-drug preaching, but Said purposefully injures himself to display his determination.

Ortolani, plagued by insomnia and violent flashbacks, puts in a request for a conjugal visit with his wife. Later, he is furious to find out that Irish-American hoodlum Ryan O'Reily, the victim of the assault which landed Ortolani in Oz, is coming to the same prison. Upon arriving, O'Reily sets out to arrange a hit on Ortolani. After getting into a bloody fight with gay inmate Billy Keane in the showers, Ortolani tries to flirt with Dr. Gloria Nathan in the infirmary. McManus punishes Ortolani by assigning him to work with the gay inmates in the AIDS ward. Nathan hates working with Ortolani and thinks McManus can't change people like him. Nonetheless, McManus successfully asks Nathan to dinner with him.

Since Ortolani had attacked his brother, Jefferson Keane agrees to O'Reily's hit. When Ortolani reacts poorly to working in the AIDS ward, McManus vindictively cancels his conjugal visit, replacing it with a behind-the-glass visit between Ortolani and his family. Ortolani tells his wife to go on with her life as though he were dead. During Ortolani's next round in the AIDS ward, he is told by a patient named Emilio Sanchez that he wants to die. In the restroom, Ortolani and O'Reily get into a fight. That night, Ortolani suffocates Sanchez in a mercy killing and is beaten, tranquilized, and left in solitary confinement by the guards. As he is sleeping, a bribed guard lets one of Keane's henchmen, Johnny Post, pour lighter fluid on Ortolani and set him on fire. A dejected McManus examines the photos of Ortolani's corpse.

== Crime flashbacks ==
More prominent prisoners in Oz are given a stylized "crime flashback," narrated by Augustus Hill, depicting the crime for which they were incarcerated. The flashbacks of the debut episode were:

- Tobias Beecher - driving while intoxicated and vehicular manslaughter of a minor.
- Kareem Said - arson in the second degree.
- Dino Ortolani - murder in the first degree and assault with a deadly weapon (Ryan O'Reily wounded).

== Production ==
"<...>there's something in the first episode. As I was writing it, I had to close my eyes; because I didn't want to see myself writing the words I had to write down. And the actor. The poor actor. [laughs] He read the script, and he called me up, and he went: "Now, you...this is a joke, right? You're not really doing this?"

— Tom Fontana about his commitment to daring, taboo-breaking writing that would become the signature of the series

Creator Tom Fontana pitched the idea of Oz to the cable channel HBO after years of dissatisfaction working within the constraints of network television and their expression-limiting censoring requirements. Executive producer Barry Levinson had visited penal institutions, such as the Baltimore City Jail and the Maryland House of Correction, before when researching for his previous TV series and felt that the prison was an intimidating and scary place with many stories to tell and that a dedicated TV series about the subject matter had never been done before. HBO felt that they had had success with their previous prison-themed documentaries and decided to commission Oz as their very first hour-long dramatic series. Fontana felt extremely liberated and satisfied writing for Oz, developing graphic scenes and breaking taboos with which, he says, he would have never gotten away in network TV. HBO constructed prison sets inside a warehouse near the Manhattan's Meatpacking District. The opening credits of the show feature Tom Fontana himself getting the "Oz" tattoo.
