= Chucky Pancamo =

Charles Pancamo
- Oz character
- First appearance: "Ancient Tribes" (season 2, episode 2)
- Last appearance: "Exeunt Omnes" (season 6, episode 8)
- Created by: Tom Fontana
- Portrayed by: Chuck Zito

In-universe information
- Nicknames: Chucky the Enforcer, Chucky

Charles "Chucky The Enforcer" Pancamo is a fictional character, played by Chuck Zito, on the HBO series Oz. Pancamo is a member of the "Wiseguys", a collection of Sicilian-American inmates connected to the Mafia.

== Character overview ==
"Prisoner #97P468: Charles Pancamo, a.k.a. "Chucky the Enforcer." Convicted June 4, 1997. Sentence: 35 years, up for parole in 15."

Pancamo is introduced in the show's second season. His grandfather worked for Al Capone in the 1920's and was given a medallion by Capone that he used when betting, later bestowed on Pancamo. He is fluent in Italian and English. He is from Little Italy, Manhattan, a Sicilian-American mobster serving time for tying a woman in a body bag and throwing her into the ocean. Unlike other prisoners with flashbacks showing their crimes, it's not mentioned what crime he was convicted of (presumably some degree of murder), nor is any context given for why he committed the crime. Extremely strong and physically imposing, he is primarily the muscle of the Wiseguys until he is later asked to take over by Antonio Nappa. Pancamo runs the gambling and drug businesses in Oz. He is generally regarded as one of the most feared and respected inmates, but makes several mistakes as a leader of the Sicilians. He is shown to be less cunning than other gang leaders such as Morales and Adebisi, however, unlike Morales and Adebisi, Pancamo usually finds a way to come out of each situation on top and is the only leader in Oz to survive the entire duration of the show.

== Development ==
Tom Fontana, who hired Chuck Zito to play Pancamo, said, "I'm going to push you and your character. I'm going to take you to places you've never been." Zito replied, "That's fine. But there's one thing you should know. I don't do rapes, and I don't get raped. And I do my own wardrobe." Zito is one of the few actors on the show that has spent time in prison. When Zito auditioned for the role, the characters first name was "Sam", but was changed to Chucky after Zito received the part.

== Fictional history ==
=== Season 2 ===
Pancamo acts as second-in-command to Peter Schibetta. Pancamo does not really like the black inmates who work in the kitchen and calls them "moolies". He helps Schibetta try to kill Simon Adebisi, leader of the Homeboys, the prison's black gangsters. Adebisi is able to defeat both of his attackers and knocks Pancamo out with a can of peaches. Adebisi rapes Schibetta, but Pancamo will not confirm that it has happened since he was unconscious. Things look up for Pancamo and the Sicilians when Pancamo’s mentor and former boss, Antonio Nappa arrives in Oz and quickly brings the Sicilians back into power. After taking Adebisi off of heroin for the time being with the help of Sicilian staff member Lenny Burrano, Nappa steals Adebisi's drugs and then makes Wangler an offer he can’t refuse - If he whacks Kipekemie Jara, an elderly, African man who has Adebisi under control, then Wangler and his paisans can work together with the Wiseguys and they will all call a truce. Wangler kills Jara and the Sicilians accept the Homeboys as their business partners.

=== Season 3 ===
The season starts with Adebisi being released from the psych ward and coming back to work in the Sicilians kitchen. When Nappa gets infected with HIV, he makes Pancamo acting leader of the Sicilians. Afterwards, Pancamo finds out that Nappa is publishing a biography detailing all the criminal acts he has committed with the Mob. With the okay from Nappa's superiors in the Family outside of Oz, Pancamo has the book destroyed and has Nappa’s cellmate, Nat Ginzburg murder Nappa.

Adebisi comes to Pancamo, asking to be partners in the drug trade. Adebisi asks him that if he kills the other Homeboys, can he be their new partner. Pancamo agrees. Adebisi, with help from the Latinos, burns Poet and Pierce in the kitchen with hot soup and then Wangler is left without any help and at Adebisi's mercy. As a result, Pancamo, Adebisi and Hernandez now are three way partners in the drug trade in Oz. Pancamo represents the Sicilians in the Oz boxing tournament. After easily knocking out a Biker in round 1 of his first match, in Pancamo’s next bout in the tournament, Pancamo somehow loses to Cyril O'Reily, the mentally handicapped brother of Ryan O'Reily. Wondering how he lost to an inmate who he had over 60 lbs. on, he is told by Russian prisoner, Nikolai Stanislofsky that the fight was fixed by Russian mobster, Yuri Kosygin. With advice from O'Reily, Pancamo gets Kosygin placed in isolation by tricking him into trying to kill Stanislofsky.

Later, racial tension brews in Oz, and Pancamo tells Adebisi to cool the rhetoric or else they will be unable to sell drugs if Oz is locked down, 24/7. Adebisi refuses and Hernandez points out to Pancamo that Adebisi is in an insane state of mind again. Vern Schillinger talks to Pancamo and all the other white inmates in the cafeteria, claiming that they must all stick together because they are bound by the color of their skin. Warden Glynn however locks Oz down going into the new millennium.

=== Season 4 Part I ===
Oz is no longer locked down and things for the time being go back to normal until a mass shooting orchestrated by Adebisi takes place in Emerald City. Pancamo and his crew hide behind a table until the gunmen kills himself, Following this and a number of other incidents Warden Glynn fires McManus. In Em City, Pancamo sponsors a new Italian-American prisoner named Ralph Galino, a contractor who is imprisoned for his alleged part in a building collapse. Galino then reveals that he has no criminal connections, worked an honest job and despises the Guido gangster stereotype that Pancamo and others like him give to law-abiding Italians and Sicilians. This causes the Wiseguys to ignore Galino as he is unable to provide any use to their operations. Hernandez reports Adebisi to the Warden for getting the gun inside Oz. In the meantime, a new Latino inmate Enrique Morales arrives in Oz. Because Morales comes in with credibility and Pancamo and Adebisi think Hernandez is on the verge of a mental breakdown, they prefer that Morales run the Latinos in the drug trade, giving him Hernandez's third if Hernandez is eliminated. Morales agrees and has senior-citizen inmate, Bob Rebadow kill him. In the meantime, another new prisoner Desmond Mobay, a Jamaican inmate needs into the drug game. Unknowing to Morales, Adebisi and Pancamo, Mobay is actually an African-American narcotics detective named Johnny Basil. They all ask Mobay to do a variety of tests to prove that he can be a reliable gangster such as taking repeated punches from Pancamo and snorting heroin (which undercover police officers are forbidden to do) among other things. A straw poll is then taken to determine if Mobay is worthy where Pancamo votes yes, Adebisi votes no and Morales abstains. To break this tie, they resolve that he will be a worthy ally under the condition that he kills an inmate, far from Em City. Mobay does so and for the time being has Pancamo's support.

Things get even better in the drug trade when new unit manager, an African American named Martin Querns replaces Tim McManus. Querns tells Adebisi that he, Pancamo and Morales can have unrestricted drug dealing if they prevent any violence from happening in Em City. He enforces this by making Pancamo, Morales and Adebisi trustees. In the meantime, Hank Schillinger, son of Aryan Brotherhood leader Vernon Schillinger, beats a murder charge for killing the son of Tobias Beecher. Beecher comes to Pancamo and hires him to arrange a hit on Hank, which he does after Beecher promptly pays him. Things get complicated, however, when several of the white inmates and guards are transferred out. All the new guards are black and all the new inmates are black and allied with Adebisi. When Pancamo's cellmate Don Zanghi is thrown into solitary confinement for getting into a racially charged fight with Mondo Browne, Pancamo is assaulted by a black guard named Officer Johnson with a billy club for protesting. Pancamo and Morales both talk to Adebisi about how they are disappointed with the way things are set up as a result. Adebisi tells them that he is cutting them out of the drug trade completely and when Morales threatens to go to war, Adebisi says that they will both lose since Em City is now overwhelmingly black and then tells them that he and Querns have arranged for the Sicilian and Latino inmates to be transferred to general population. In Unit B, Schillinger suggests to Pancamo and Hoyt that an all-white unit should be created which Unit B manager, McManus ardently rejects.

=== Season 4 Part II ===
After Adebisi has been killed by Kareem Said, Em City is running back to normal. With no leader the Homeboys are out of the drug trade so Pancamo and Morales are both cruising comfortably. Things get complicated when the Homeboys are brought back into the fold by new inmate Burr Redding, who is married to Hill's mother. Pancamo and Morales offer a partnership that Redding rejects. As a result, Pancamo and Morales tell ex-communicated Homeboy Supreme Allah, whom Redding despises, that he can be their partner if he kills Redding. Supreme says yes with time so that he can get the approval of other Homeboys. In the meantime, Morales frames Redding for murdering a Chinese refugee and as a result Redding plans his own attack on the Latino and Sicilian inmates. The Sicilians and Latinos are playing basketball in the gym when the Homeboys are ready to ambush them. A deadly fight would have occurred had Augustus Hill not tipped off the COs. Supreme Allah is then killed and Redding is back in full swing.

=== Season 5 ===
Mcmanus inform the Sicilians that Peter Scibetta is being released from psych, the Sicillians are reluctant to associate with him, due to the stigma but outwardly agree to aid his recovery out of respect to his father and also because he is their paisan. Pancamo is called to an interrogation by FBI agent Pierce Taylor, who tells him that a Sicilian hitman named Gaetano Cincetta has implicated him in the murder of Hank Schillinger. Pancamo denies everything to Agent Taylor, who tells Pancamo his next meeting is with Hank's father and Aryan Brotherhood leader Vernon Schillinger hinting that he'll tell Schillinger that Pancamo had Schillinger's son murdered. Pancamo informs Tobias Beecher after his meeting with Agent Taylor and promises Beecher because it was his mistake, he’ll cover for him. Later the Aryan Brotherhood attacks Pancamo and the Sicilians, James Robson approaches Pancamo from behind and stabs him in the side, putting him in the hospital. At the end of the season, Pancamo nearly dies in the hospital from a staph infection brought on by poor medical treatment, but he survives thanks to Oz's chief physician, Dr. Gloria Nathan. While Pancamo is in the hospital, the Sicilians fall apart: Schibetta driven by rejection of his leadership by his paisans, who will only go after the aryaans on Pancamo's orders, leads to him foolishly attempting to redeem his reputation, by attacking Robson and Schillinger is hospitalized after being gang raped by the Aryans. Redding convinces Warden Glynn, who was blackmailed by Scibetta, to let him run the kitchen and kicks the Sicilians out, Morales and Redding muscle them out of the drug trade. The timely arrival of new inmate Frank Urbano a Sicilian Hitman takes over for Pancamo and helps them regain their standing. The Sicilians fight back against the Aryans, Pancamo orders the Sicilians to protect Beecher's friend, convicted rapist Adam Gunzel who the Aryaans want, Urbano beats Robson so badly putting him in Hospital where he taunts Pancamo, who is still recovering from his wounds. Pancamo is prevented from moving on Robson by a CO, Urbano, unsuccessfully makes an attempt on Redding's life after he overdosed Sicilian inmate Salvatore Desanto's food with LSD. After Redding alienates his alliance with the Latino inmates, both incidents are caused by Homeboys inamte Arnold "Poet" Jackson, who is desperate to conceal he caused Hill's overdose, leading Morales and Urbano to negotiate a favourable deal to take back their share of the drug trade. As a gesture of goodwill for their alliance, the Sicilian agree to kill Redding, which fails, due to the interference of Augustus Hill, during the melee Augustus Hill is stabbed killed, leaving Redding distraught and dispirited at losing his last remaining family member. With the Homeboys in disarray, the Aaryan's defeated, the Sicilians regain their share in the drug trade, Chuckie recovers and reclaims his role as leader of the Sicilian's.

=== Season 6 ===
At the beginning of season 6, Pancamo is released from the hospital ward and his partnership in the drug trade with Morales is running smoothly, The Homeboys still angry over Hill's death initiate fights with the Sicilians. Ryan O'Reily lies to Pancamo about Peter Schibetta wishing to curse Pancamo with the evil eye, after he boasts that he will put the curse on everyone Ryan cares about until he is unable to bear the grief, in retaliation for causing his fathers death in season 1, but Pancamo believes him, as Scibetta has previously blamed him for past failures and being assaulted, so he and the Sicilians kill Schibetta and remove his eye. Pancamo then attempts to attacks James Robson in the prison library after being expelled from the aryans, but Robson is saved by a C.O. From there, Robson seeks protection from Wolfgang Cutler, who makes him his sex slave. Pancamo later tries to assault Robson in the cafeteria, when Robson swears at him, but Cutler steps in and fights him off. When Redding takes the Homeboys to work as telemarketers, Glynn gives back control of the kitchen to Pancamo and the Sicilians under the condition that they stay away from the Aryans. In the gym, Pancamo and the other Sicilians approach Robson with an offer he can’t refuse. They tell him that if he whacks Cutler, they will forgive him. Robson has sex with Cutler one last time then persuades Cutler to hang himself, making it look like a suicide. Pancamo is then approached by Redding, who asks him to stop any attempt by the Homeboys to deal drugs so they will be forced back to work as telemarketers. Pancamo gladly does so and has one of Poet's drug connections outside of prison incapacitated. Pancamo then sees a new inmate selling hash brownies in the cafeteria. The Sicilians corner him after killing his contacts and kill him with hot steam from a pipe inside the storage room. In the end, the Sicilians have a monopoly over the drug trade, with the Homeboys working as telemarketers and the Latinos leaderless after Morales is killed in the infirmary. In the meantime, a gay nightclub owner named Alonzo Torquemada is sent to Oz and sells designer drugs called D-Tabs. Torquemada approaches Pancamo with an offer he can't refuse - A partnership using his connection through Pancamo's nephew, Angelo as a reference. Pancamo accepts and to celebrate their new partnership, Torquemada gives Pancamo some free D-Tabs for him to pass among the Sicilians. The Sicilian and other inmates are evacuated after the unknown substance attack causes OZ to be evacuated.
