= Ryan O'Reilly (disambiguation) =

Ryan O'Reilly may refer to:

- Ryan O'Reilly (born 1991), Canadian ice hockey player
- Konnor (wrestler) (born 1980), American wrestler also known as Ryan O'Reilly

== See also ==
- Ryan O'Reily, a character from the television show Oz
