= Tobias Beecher =

Fictional character

- Oz character
- First appearance: The Routine (episode 1.01)
- Last appearance: ZO (2024)
- Portrayed by: Lee Tergesen

In-universe information
- Gender: Male
- Title: ID 97B412
- Occupation: Prisoner
- Spouse: Genevieve Beecher
- Significant other: Chris Keller

Tobias Beecher is a fictional character on the television show Oz, played by Lee Tergesen. He is one of only nine regular characters (both prisoners and guards) to survive the entire run of the show. The others are Bob Rebadow, Ryan O'Reily, Miguel Alvarez, Arnold "Poet" Jackson, Sister Peter Marie Reimondo, Tim McManus, Father Ray Mukada, and Dr. Gloria Nathan.

== Character overview ==
"Prisoner #97B412: Tobias Beecher. Convicted July 5, 1997 - Driving While Intoxicated, Vehicular Manslaughter. Sentence: 15 years, up for parole in 4. Parole denied in 2001. Parole granted in 2003. Brought back to OZ due to a parole violation."

Tobias Beecher, a graduate of Harvard Law School, became a successful attorney, husband and father but was also an alcoholic. He was already arrested twice for driving while intoxicated. This time, when he does again, he runs over and kills a little girl named Kathy Rockwell. Beecher was offered a plea bargain. He would serve his sentence in a minimum state prison. But Beecher, not wanting to do any time in prison instead goes to trial seeking an acquittal. The effort fails and the judge, a family friend of the Beecher's sought to make an example of him and was ultimately sentenced to 15 years in a maximum security prison with a chance of parole in four.

Beecher's personal transformation form is a major part of the show's drama, particularly in the first season. Arriving in Oz without any street skills and having a naturally timid personality, he became a target of abuse and was hardened by his experiences, particularly with his arch-nemesis Vernon Schillinger. He later remarks that in OZ he became “the man he always was and never knew”. Despite having done terrible things while in OZ, including murdering a guard named Karl Metzger, Beecher has many moments where he seems aware of how far he has gotten and often tries to atone, most notably in his part in the death of Andrew Peter Schillinger.

=== Season 1 ===
Beecher quickly learns that he is out of his element when he witnesses fellow arrival Miguel Alvarez (Kirk Acevedo) getting shanked right before entering Cell Block E, or "Emerald City." He is roomed with predatory inmate Simon Adebisi (Adewale Akinnuoye-Agbaje) during his first week in the titular facility. Approaching him in friendship, inmate Vernon Schillinger (J.K. Simmons) offers to be his new cellmate. Beecher, completely unaware that Schillinger is the leader of the Aryan Brotherhood, naively accepts the offer, only to be "initiated" into prison life when Schillinger rapes him and burns a swastika onto his right buttock. Beecher is frequently routinely abused and humiliated as the Brotherhood's sex slave, or "prag". In attempting to deal with the trauma, Beecher starts using heroin and develops an addiction. This is quickly noticed by prison psychologist Sister Peter Marie Reimondo (Rita Moreno), who arranges for Beecher to attend group drug counseling.

In preparation for a prison talent show, Schillinger has Beecher get a "makeover" from one of Em City's drag queens. At the show, Beecher sings a rendition of "I Got It Bad (and That Ain't Good)" while dressed in women's clothing and makeup. Among other tortures, Schillinger makes Beecher beg to have sex with his wife before a conjugal visit, forces him to eat pages of a law book, polish Schillinger's boots with his tongue, and orders him to tear up pictures of his family. In an attempt to reach him, Sister Pete arranges for Beecher to meet with the mother of his DUI victim. Beecher is too ashamed to speak, however, and the girl's mother angrily lashes out at him.

Eventually, Schillinger tires of Beecher and forces him to leave the cell wearing a Confederate Flag t-shirt. Beecher, fearing he will be killed by a black inmate, goes to Irish-American inmate Ryan O'Reily (Dean Winters), who provides him with PCP. Beecher then seeks out Schillinger, smashes the acrylic glass wall of his cell, and sends a broken shard flying into his eye. Beecher almost commits suicide immediately afterward, but is restrained by guards and put in the isolation ward. After being released, he confronts Schillinger in the prison gym's basketball court. He assaults Schillinger, ties him down, then defecates upon him in front of other inmates. This earns him respect from inmates such as O'Reily, Alvarez, and even Adebisi. When a riot erupts in Em City, Beecher sides with O'Reily in the chaos, defending him from an attack by the Muslims, as neither belongs to any strong gangs.

=== Season 2 ===
Beecher shares a cell with James Robson (R.E. Rodgers), an Aryan who tries to make Beecher perform oral sex on him. Beecher bites off the tip of Robson's penis, landing him in solitary. There, he is interviewed by Alvah Case (Charles S. Dutton), who is investigating the riot. Upon his release from isolation, Beecher threatens to manipulate Sister Pete's psychiatric reports to ruin Schillinger's chances at parole. Frightened, Schillinger tries to put a hit on Beecher. He resorts to blackmailing corrections officer Diane Whittlesey (Edie Falco) with knowledge that she had shot prisoner Scott Ross (Steven Gavedon) during the riot. Whittlesey reluctantly agrees to the hit if Schillinger will keep quiet. Beecher disappears and Schillinger subsequently meets with Whittlesey to see his dead body. Whittlesey reveals that she recorded their conversation. Schillinger is arrested for conspiracy to commit murder, lengthening his sentence.

Despite Beecher's celebratory mood, his new cellmate, Augustus Hill (Harold Perrineau), warns him that Schillinger will be out for revenge. Unit Manager Tim McManus (Terry Kinney) also forces Beecher to confront the judge who sentenced him; she expresses remorse for her ruling and apologizes to him. Beecher responds that she was right in her ruling, but adds that he can't forgive her. After Hill is transferred to a different cell, Beecher is paired with Chris Keller (Chris Meloni), a charming sociopath. Later, Beecher receives word that his wife has killed herself; Schillinger brags that the Aryans actually killed her and staged the death as a suicide. Beecher gradually finds he is attracted to Keller, only to learn that Keller is working with Schillinger. After driving Beecher to start drinking again, the two corner him with the help of an Aryan guard, Karl Metzger (Bill Fagerbakke), and break his arms and legs.

=== Season 3 ===
A vengeful Beecher is released from the infirmary at the start of the season. Keller, who had genuinely fallen in love with Beecher, tries to win back his trust, but Beecher refuses to forgive him. Beecher soon gets to work enacting his revenge. He kills Metzger by slashing his throat with his sharpened fingernails, and he probably stabs Keller non-lethally (although we don't clearly see the man stabbing him). When Schillinger's son Andy (Frederick Koehler) is sent to Oz, Beecher befriends the young man and arranges to share a cell with him. While Beecher does not mistreat Andy, he leads Schillinger to believe that he is going to sleep with him. Moved by Beecher's kindness, Andy renounces his father and his white supremacist ideology. Schillinger arranges to have his own son killed, having him thrown in solitary and getting a prison guard to deliver heroin on which he overdoses. Beecher feels guilty for his part in Andy's death and, following advice from Muslim leader Kareem Saïd (Eamonn Walker), resolves to ask forgiveness from Keller and Schillinger. Beecher finally forgives Keller after Keller saved him from Schillinger's attack, and the two reunite as lovers.

=== Season 4 ===
==== Part I ====
Beecher tries to bury the hatchet with Schillinger further by having a private investigator at his father's law firm search for his younger son Hank (Andrew Barchilon). However, Schillinger thinks Beecher is trying to turn Hank against him and orders his son to kidnap Beecher's children. Hank kills Beecher's son, then severs his hand and mails it to him in Oz. However, he ultimately releases his daughter on Schillinger's orders. Schillinger also pays prisoner Eli Zabitz (David Johansen) to tell Beecher that Keller is responsible for the kidnapping. An enraged Beecher tries to kill Keller; he is remorseful upon learning the truth, but an angry Keller casts him aside. Upon learning that Hank has been acquitted due to a legal technicality, he approaches Chucky Pancamo (Chuck Zito) in order to commission a hit. Beecher has second thoughts and tries to cancel the hit, only to learn that he is too late: Hank is already dead.

==== Part II ====
When Schillinger learns of Hank's death, he plots revenge. However, Keller falsely confesses to having hired the hitman to protect Beecher, and is transferred to another prison in Massachusetts shortly afterwards. Beecher and Schillinger then are involved in a victim-attacker interaction program led by Sister Pete. The two make significant progress, but are ultimately unable to overcome their mutual grudge.

Keller's confession results in Beecher being up for parole, and he falls in love with his attorney, Katherine McClain (Sandra Purpuro). However, Beecher is denied parole and succumbs to despair. Later that day in the library, Schillinger and Robson come by to taunt Beecher. Before they can harm him, Saïd appears and stabs them both.

=== Season 5 ===
Fearing a war between the Aryans and Muslims, Sister Pete suggests Beecher act as a mediator between Schillinger and Saïd. In the first mediation, Beecher says that Saïd and Schillinger are very alike despite drastic differences in beliefs. Pancamo informs Beecher that Agent Pierce Taylor (Robert John Burke) has implicated him in Hank's murder, and will likely inform Schillinger that Pancamo arranged the hit of his son. Shortly after, Keller is transferred back to Oz and, now suspected of a series of murders, is isolated from the general population and Beecher. During another mediation in which homosexuality is discussed, Beecher attacks Schillinger when he denies ever raping him. Afterwards, convicted rapists Franklin Winthrop (Andy Powers) and Adam Guenzel (Mike Doyle) arrive in Oz, the latter being a friend of Beecher's family. Beecher, fearing for Guenzel's safety, recruits the Italians to protect him. Schillinger forces Winthrop, now a sex slave for the Aryans, to tell the homophobic Guenzel about Beecher's past relationships with men and spread false rumors about the pair.

Schillinger offers to let Beecher reunite with Keller if he convinces McManus to transfer Guenzel to a cell block where the Italians won't protect him. Beecher initially refuses, but gives in when Guenzel assaults and humiliates Beecher. Beecher later finds a bloodied Guenzel in the gym following his gang rape by the Aryans. Saïd counsels a guilt-stricken Beecher to give up his relationship with Keller and help Guenzel any way he can. Beecher asks Sister Pete to talk to Guenzel and Schillinger; afraid that Guenzel will eventually inform on the Aryans, Schillinger arranges for Guenzel to die during a staged escape attempt. Beecher tells the authorities about Schillinger's rapes of Winthrop and Guenzel and his involvement with Guenzel's death. Warden Leo Glynn (Ernie Hudson) moves Schillinger to solitary. Beecher sees Keller, who has just been found guilty of murder, and the two share an intimate kiss.

=== Season 6 ===
Beecher is transferred to a safer unit, as McManus sees that he is being targeted by the Aryans for testifying against Schillinger. Beecher's father, Harrison (Edward Herrmann), appeals Keller's death sentence until Winthrop kills him to join the Aryans. Beecher is paroled, inherits his father's law firm, and gets Keller's sentence overturned. However, Beecher is sent back to prison after a lonely Keller arranges for him to get caught buying drugs. Upon returning to Oz, Beecher severs ties with Keller. In an attempt to make Beecher forgive him, Keller switches a prop knife for a real one before a prison production of Macbeth, resulting in Schillinger's death when Beecher stabs him. When Beecher rejects Keller for the final time, Keller throws himself backwards over a railing to make it look like Beecher murdered him. With his last chance to leave Oz gone, Beecher thinks he will face the death penalty; however, Keller states that he took care of the Aryans, and a mysterious package with a toxic powder kills everyone in the mailroom and causes an evacuation of Oz. Beecher smiles knowing Keller planned it.

=== ZO ===
In the 2024 short film ZO, Beecher and O'Reily are shown in their lives after prison. In the intervening years since the evacuation of Oz they have since fallen out. Beecher is estranged from his family, it also revealed his mother got him a pardon from the Governor, though its not known if its Devlin who issued the pardon. O'Reilly released from prison calls him, following an inflammatory phone call, in which insults and barbs are traded, the once close allies look to be starting war with each other.
