= Scott William Winters =

American actor (born 1965)

- Born: August 5, 1965 (age 60); New York, New York, U.S.
- Occupation: Actor
- Years active: 1996–present
- Spouse: Jennifer Logan Winters
- Children: 2
- Relatives: Dean Winters (brother)

Scott William Winters (born August 5, 1965) is an American actor.

Winters is of Irish and Italian descent, and grew up on Long Island and in Scottsdale, Arizona. He attended Brophy College Preparatory, a Jesuit school in Phoenix. Winters has three siblings: brothers Dean (an actor) and Bradford (a poet/writer), and a sister, Blair Winters. Scott is best known for playing Cyril O'Reily in the HBO drama Oz opposite his brother, Dean, who appeared as Cyril's brother, Ryan.

Winters had a notable role in the 1997 film Good Will Hunting as Clark, a pompous rival for Minnie Driver's attention who is bested by Matt Damon. He reprised the role, along with Damon and Ben Affleck, in a parody scene in Jay and Silent Bob Strike Back (2001). He played Det. Stan Hatcher, a recurring character on the TV series NYPD Blue. He appeared in a few episodes of Season 6 of 24, as FBI Agent Samuels, and in Season 3 of The Americans as EST seminar leader Lawrence. He made an appearance in the show The Book of Daniel, in an episode that was only aired online.

== Filmography ==
- The Prosecutors – Jeff Kendall (TV movie, 1996)
- The People vs. Larry Flynt – Blow Dried Jerk (1996)
- Good Will Hunting – Clark (1997)
- Homicide: Life on the Street – Eddie Dugan (2 episodes, 1997)
- Promised Land – Ellis (1 episode, 1998)
- Oz – Cyril O'Reily (45 episodes, 1998–2003)
- The Pretender – Ray (1 episode, 1999)
- The Beat – Damon Lawrence (1 episode, 2000)
- Angel – Jack McNamara (1 episode, 2000)
- Jay and Silent Bob Strike Back – Clark/Himself (2001) (Uncredited)
- The Dead Zone – Ranger Randy Turman (1 episode, 2003)
- Fastlane – Ghost Goucher (1 episode, 2003)
- 10-8: Officers on Duty – Senior Deputy Matt Jablonski (15 episodes, 2003–2004)
- CSI: Miami – Fred Kinnan (1 episode, 2004)
- NYPD Blue – Detective Stan Hatcher (7 episodes, 2004)
- The Jury – John McCarthy (1 episode, 2004)
- Numb3rs – Glen Nash (1 episode, 2005)
- Crossing Jordan – Ranger (1 episode, 2005)
- North Shore – Marvin (1 episode, 2005)
- Dexter – Detective McNamara (2 episodes, 2006)
- CSI: Crime Scene Investigation – Don Fitzgibbons (1 episode, 2006)
- Wildfire – Hal Berney (1 episode, 2006)
- 13 Graves – Gary Domino (TV Movie, 2006)
- Without a Trace – Don Foster (1 episode, 2007)
- Lincoln Heights – Lieutenant Pogue (2 episodes, 2007)
- 24 – FBI Agent Samuels (4 episodes, 2007)
- Eyes – Detective Bates (1 episode, 2007)
- Law & Order – Timmy Serco (1 episode, 2008)
- Urgency – Canaan (2010)
- New York'ta Beş Minare (2010)
- Borgia – Riario Sansoni (25 episodes, 2011–2014)
- The Leftovers – Michael (1 episode, 2014)
- Law & Order: Special Victims Unit – Robert Dumas, NYPD detective (4 episodes, 2011–2015)
- The Americans – Lawrence, EST seminar leader (2015)
- Lethal Weapon – Deputy Luke Barton (1 episode, 2017)
- Berlin Station – Nick Fischer (4 episodes, 2017)
- Criminal Minds – Dr. Robert Smith (1 episode, 2018)
- NCIS – Westley Clark, CIA officer (3 episodes, 2018–2019)
- Station 19 – Officer Schneider (1 episode, 2020)
