= R.E. Rodgers =

American film, stage and television actor

- Born: Richard Edward Rodgers
- Occupations: Film and television actor

Richard Edward Rodgers is an American film, stage and television actor. He is best known for playing James Robson in the American prison drama television series Oz.

Rodgers guest-starred in television programs including Law & Order: Special Victims Unit and The Jury. He played the recurring role of Scarface in the CBS soap opera television series Guiding Light, and the recurring role of Niko in the Fox crime drama television series Jonny Zero. In 1996, he played Officer Sanchez in the film Ed's Next Move. He also appeared in films such as School Ties, The Thomas Crown Affair and Bad Boys II. During his screen career, in 2005, he starred as the soap opera addicted chauffeur Edward in the stage play Dedication or The Stuff of Dreams.

Rodgers retired from acting in 2006, last appearing in the CBS crime drama television series Numb3rs.
