= Oz (TV series) =

American prison drama television series

- Genre: Crime; Serial drama; Psychological drama; Thriller; Tragedy
- Created by: Tom Fontana
- Showrunner: Tom Fontana
- Written by: Tom Fontana
- Starring: Ernie Hudson; Terry Kinney; Harold Perrineau; Eamonn Walker; Kirk Acevedo; Rita Moreno; J. K. Simmons; Lee Tergesen; Dean Winters; Adewale Akinnuoye-Agbaje
- Music by: Steve Rosen; Dave Darlington
- Country of origin: United States
- No. of seasons: 6
- No. of episodes: 56 (list of episodes)

Production
- Executive producers: Tom Fontana; Barry Levinson; Jim Finnerty
- Producers: Debbie Sarjeant; Mark A. Baker; Irene Burns; Bridget Potter; Jorge Zamacona; Greer Yeaton
- Cinematography: Alex Zakrzewski; Jean de Segonzac; Craig DiBona; Glenn Kershaw
- Editors: Sue Blainey; Cindy Mollo; Vanessa Procopio; Jay Pires; James Y. Kwei; Ken Eluto; Deborah Moran
- Running time: 55–80 minutes
- Production companies: The Levinson/Fontana Company; HBO Original Programming; Viacom Productions (seasons 4–5); Rysher Entertainment (seasons 1–5)

Original release
- Network: HBO
- Release: July 12, 1997 – February 23, 2003

Oz is an American prison drama television series created, co-executive produced, and principally written by Tom Fontana. Set at a fictional men's prison, it was the first one-hour dramatic television series produced by the premium cable network HBO. Oz ran for six seasons, from its premiere on July 12, 1997, to its series finale on February 23, 2003.

== Overview ==
"Oz" is the nickname for the Oswald State Correctional Facility, formerly Oswald State Penitentiary, a fictional level 4 maximum-security state prison in an unspecified East Coast state, although references throughout the series point to New York as its location. The nickname "Oz" also refers to L. Frank Baum's fictional Land of Oz. Most of the series' story arcs are set in "Emerald City", a wing of the prison that is named after a fantastic place in the Oz books.

== Plot ==
In an experimental unit of the prison, unit manager Tim McManus emphasizes rehabilitation and learning responsibility during incarceration, rather than carrying out purely punitive measures. Emerald City is an extremely controlled environment, with a carefully managed balance of members from each racial and social group, intended to ease tensions among these various factions. However, almost all of these factions are constantly at war with one another which often results in many prisoners being beaten, raped, or murdered.

Under McManus and Warden Leo Glynn, all inmates in "Em City" struggle to fulfill their own needs. Some fight for power – either over the drug trade or over other inmate factions and individuals. Others, corrections officers and inmates alike, simply want to survive, some long enough to make parole and others just to see the next day. The show's narrator, inmate Augustus Hill, explains the show, and provides context, thematic analysis, and a sense of humor.

Oz chronicles McManus' attempts to keep control over the inmates of Em City. There are many groups of inmates throughout the show, and not everyone within each group survives the show's events. There are the African-American Homeboys (Adebisi, Wangler, Redding, Poet, Keane) and Muslims (Said, Arif, Khan), the Wiseguys (Pancamo, Nappa, Schibetta, Ortolani), the Aryan Brotherhood (Schillinger, Robson, Mack), the Latinos of El Norte (Alvarez, Morales, Guerra, Hernandez), the Irish (Mostly made up of the O'Reily brothers), the Gays (Hanlon, Cramer, Ginzburg, Torquemada), the Bikers (Hoyt, Ross), the Christians (Cloutier, Coushaine, Cudney) and many other individuals not completely affiliated with one particular group (Rebadow, Busmalis, Keller, Stanislofsky). In contrast to the dangerous criminals, central character Tobias Beecher gives a look at a usually law-abiding albeit alcoholic man who made one fatal drunk-driving mistake.

== Cast and characters ==
From left to right: Ryan O'Reily, Vernon Schillinger, Miguel Alvarez, Tobias Beecher, Kareem Saïd, In the front sits Augustus Hill (this photo was also used as the cover for Hill's book)

Main actors are credited as "starring" in the opening title sequence, while supporting actors are listed under "also starring". Guest actors are listed in the show's end credits.

=== Main ===
Actor	Character	Seasons					
Actor	Character	1	2	3	4	5	6
Ernie Hudson	Warden Leo Glynn	Main	Main	Main	Main	Main	Main
Terry Kinney	Tim McManus	Main	Main	Main	Main	Main	Main
Harold Perrineau	Augustus Hill	Main	Main	Main	Main	Main	Main
Eamonn Walker	Kareem Saïd	Main	Main	Main	Main	Main	Main
Kirk Acevedo	Miguel Alvarez	Supporting	Main	Main	Main	Main	Main
Rita Moreno	Sister Peter Marie Reimondo	Supporting	Main	Main	Main	Main	Main
J. K. Simmons	Vernon Schillinger	Main	Main	Main	Main	Main	Main
Lee Tergesen	Tobias Beecher	Main	Main	Main	Main	Main	Main
Dean Winters	Ryan O'Reily	Supporting	Main	Main	Main	Main	Main
Adewale Akinnuoye-Agbaje	Simon Adebisi	Guest	Supporting	Main	Main		

=== Supporting ===
Actor	Character	Seasons					
Actor	Character	1	2	3	4	5	6
B.D. Wong	Father Ray Mukada	Supporting	Supporting	Supporting	Supporting	Supporting	Supporting
Edie Falco	Officer Diane Whittlesey	Supporting	Supporting	Supporting	Guest		
Sean Whitesell	Donald Groves	Supporting					
Tony Musante	Nino Schibetta	Supporting					
Leon Robinson	Jefferson Keane	Supporting					Guest
Jon Seda	Dino Ortolani	Guest					Guest
Lauren Vélez	Dr. Gloria Nathan	Guest	Supporting	Supporting	Supporting	Supporting	Supporting
George Morfogen	Bob Rebadow	Guest	Supporting	Supporting	Supporting	Supporting	Supporting
J. D. Williams	Kenny Wangler	Guest	Guest	Supporting	Supporting		
Željko Ivanek	Governor James Devlin	Guest	Guest	Supporting	Supporting	Supporting	Supporting
muMs da Schemer	Arnold "Poet" Jackson	Guest	Guest	Supporting	Supporting	Supporting	Supporting
Granville Adams	Zahir Arif	Guest	Guest	Supporting	Supporting	Supporting	Supporting
Rick Fox	Jackson Vahue	Guest	Guest		Supporting		Supporting
Eddie Malavarca	Peter Schibetta	Guest	Guest	Guest		Supporting	Supporting
Tom Mardirosian	Agamemnon Busmalis		Guest	Supporting	Supporting	Supporting	Supporting
Christopher Meloni	Chris Keller		Guest	Supporting	Supporting	Supporting	Supporting
Scott William Winters	Cyril O'Reily		Guest	Supporting	Supporting	Supporting	Supporting
Austin Pendleton	William Giles		Guest	Supporting	Supporting	Supporting	
Kathryn Erbe	Shirley Bellinger		Guest	Supporting	Supporting		Guest
Luis Guzmán	Raoul "El Cid" Hernandez		Guest	Supporting	Supporting		
Mark Margolis	Antonio Nappa		Guest	Supporting			Guest
Chuck Zito	Chucky Pancamo		Guest	Guest	Supporting	Supporting	Supporting
R.E. Rodgers	James Robson		Guest	Guest	Guest	Guest	Supporting
Evan Seinfeld	Jaz Hoyt		Guest	Guest	Guest	Guest	Supporting
Otto Sanchez	Carmen "Chico" Guerra		Guest	Guest	Guest	Guest	Supporting
Sean Dugan	Timmy Kirk		Guest		Guest	Guest	Supporting
Robert Clohessy	Officer Sean Murphy			Supporting	Supporting	Supporting	Supporting
Kristin Rohde	Officer Claire Howell			Supporting	Supporting	Supporting	Supporting
Philip Casnoff	Nikolai Stanislofsky			Supporting	Supporting		
Seth Gilliam	Officer Clayton Hughes			Supporting	Supporting		
Kevin Conway	Seamus O'Reily			Guest	Supporting	Supporting	Supporting
Charles Busch	Nathaniel "Nat" Ginzburg			Guest	Supporting		
David Zayas	Enrique Morales				Supporting	Supporting	Supporting
Reg E. Cathey	Martin Querns				Supporting		Guest
Erik King	Moses Deyell				Supporting		
Lance Reddick	Johnny Basil / Desmond Mobay				Supporting		
Lord Jamar	Supreme Allah / Kevin Ketchum				Supporting		
Michael Wright	Omar White				Supporting	Supporting	Supporting
Anthony Chisholm	Burr Redding				Supporting	Supporting	Supporting
Luke Perry	Jeremiah Cloutier				Supporting	Supporting	
Betty Buckley	Suzanne Fitzgerald				Supporting	Supporting	Supporting
Blake Robbins	Officer Dave Brass				Guest	Guest	Supporting
Patti LuPone	Stella Coffa						Supporting
Joel Grey	Lemuel Idzik						Supporting
Bobby Cannavale	Alonzo Torquemada						Supporting

== Episodes ==
Season	Episodes		Originally released	
Season	Episodes		First released	Last released
1	8		July 12, 1997	August 25, 1997
2	8		July 11, 1998	August 31, 1998
3	8		July 14, 1999	September 1, 1999
4	16	8	July 12, 2000	August 30, 2000
4	16	8	January 7, 2001	February 25, 2001
5	8		January 6, 2002	February 24, 2002
6	8		January 5, 2003	February 23, 2003

Oz took advantage of the freedoms of premium cable to show elements of coarse language, drug use, violence, frontal nudity, homosexuality, and rape of males, as well as ethnic and religious conflicts that would have been unacceptable to traditional advertiser-supported American broadcast television.

== Broadcast ==
=== Syndication ===
On April 21, 2009, Variety announced that starting May 31, DirecTV will broadcast all 56 episodes in their original form without commercials and in up-scaled "high definition" on The 101 Network available to all subscribers. The episodes will also be available through DirecTV's On Demand service.

=== International broadcast history ===
In Australia, Oz was screened uncensored on Channel "OH" on Optus TV, then free-to-air channel, SBS. This was also the case in Brazil, where it was aired by the SBT Network Corporation, late at night; in Ireland, where the series aired on free-to-air channel TG4 at 11 p.m.; in Israel, where Oz was displayed on the free-to-air commercial Channel 2; in Italy, where it was aired on the free-to-air Italia 1; and in the United Kingdom, where Channel 4 aired the show in a late-night time slot.

In Bosnia and Herzegovina, it was aired on the federal TV station called FTV. In Canada, Oz aired on the Showcase Channel at Friday 10 p.m. EST. In Croatia, Estonia, and Slovenia, the show was aired late at night on public, non-commercial, state-owned channels HRT, ETV, and RTV SLO, respectively. In Denmark, it appeared late at night on the non-commercial public service channel DR1. In Finland, it broadcast on the free-to-air channel Nelonen (TV4). In France, the show first aired on commercial cable channel Série Club and then on free-to-air channel M6, also late at night. In Malaysia, full episodes of Oz aired late at night on ntv7, while the censored version aired during the day. In the Netherlands, Oz aired on the commercial channel RTL 5. In New Zealand Oz aired on The Box at 9.30pm on Wednesdays in the early 2000s (decade). In Norway and Sweden, it aired on the commercial channels ZTV and TV3 late at night. In Panama, Oz aired on RPC-TV Channel 4 in a late-night hour. In Portugal, Oz aired late at night on SIC Radical, one of the SIC channels in the cable network. In Serbia, Oz aired on RTV BK Telecom. In Spain, the show aired on premium channel Canal+. In Turkey, Oz was aired on Cine5; DiziMax also aired the re-runs. In Japan, it aired on SuperChannel (now, Super! Drama TV) from 29 December 2001 to 22 July 2005.

== Rights ==
The series was co-produced by HBO and Rysher Entertainment (who owns the copyright), and the underlying U.S. rights lie with HBO Entertainment and Warner Bros. Entertainment, which has released the entire series on DVD in North America. The international rights were owned originally by Rysher, then Paramount Pictures/Domestic Television after that company acquired Rysher. Paramount Global Content Distribution currently owns the international TV rights, and Paramount Home Entertainment/CBS DVD owns the international DVD rights.

== Reception ==
Critical response of Oz
Season	Rotten Tomatoes
1	80% (25 reviews)
2	100% (6 reviews)
3	100% (6 reviews)
6	92% (12 reviews)

=== Critical reception ===
Critical reception of Oz was mostly positive. The first season of Oz has been ranked a 70 based on the rating aggregator website Metacritic, indicating generally favorable reviews by critics. Caryn James from The New York Times stated: "Set almost entirely in the prison, a high-tech horror with glass-walled cells, Oz can also be unpleasant to watch, it is so gruesome and claustrophobic. Yet ... as the series moves beyond its introductory shock value, it becomes more serious, disturbing and gripping ... The point of Oz, with its depiction of guilty men in torturous circumstances, is never subtle, but it is complicated and strong." Steve Johnson of the Chicago Tribune wrote: "Engaging, often Brutal."

Other reviews were more critical of the series. Frederic Biddle of the Boston Globe said: "A pretentious exercise in cheap thrills, by great talents allowed to run amok." Howard Rosenberg of the Los Angeles Times reported: "Its uniqueness and arresting style don't earn it an unqualified endorsement here, for its first two Fontana-written episodes are absolute downers—there's no light at the end of a tunnel, nor even a tunnel—that offer no central characters to like or pull for ... Be forewarned, too, that Oz is flat-out the most violent and graphically sexual series on TV."

=== Awards and nominations ===
Oz has had a successful run at many award associations, including, four wins out of sixteen nominations at the ALMA Awards, three wins out of six nominations at the Artios Awards, three wins out of seven nominations at the CableACE Awards, one win out of twenty-two nominations at the Online Film & Television Association Awards, and two wins out of five nomination at the Satellite Awards. It has also received awards at Il Festival Nazionale del Doppiaggio Voci nell'Ombra and the Edgar Awards.

Additional nominations consist of the NAACP Image Awards (seven), a GLAAD Media Award, a Producers Guild of America Award, a Writers Guild of America Award, and although the series has not been the recipient of any major awards, it was however nominated for two Primetime Emmy Awards, for Outstanding Guest Actor in a Drama Series (Charles S. Dutton), and Outstanding Casting for a Series (Alexa L. Fogel).

== Home media ==
=== VHS & DVD ===
The first two seasons of Oz were released on VHS in box sets. HBO Home Video has released all six seasons of Oz on DVD in Region 1 and Region 2. The Region 1 releases contain numerous special features including commentaries, deleted scenes and featurettes. The Region 2 releases do not contain any special features.

Season	Release date			Additional
Season	Region 1	Region 2	Region 4	Additional
The Complete First Season	March 19, 2002	February 5, 2007	February 15, 2007	Released on VHS & DVD in U.S.; 8 episodes; BBFC rating: 15; ACB rating: MA15+
The Complete Second Season	January 7, 2003	August 6, 2007	August 16, 2007	Released on VHS & DVD in U.S.; 8 episodes; BBFC rating: 18; ACB rating: MA15+
The Complete Third Season	February 24, 2004	October 29, 2007	November 8, 2007	8 episodes; BBFC rating: 18; ACB rating: MA15+
The Complete Fourth Season	February 1, 2005	March 3, 2008	March 20, 2008	16 episodes; BBFC rating: 18; ACB rating: MA15+
The Complete Fifth Season	June 21, 2005	June 30, 2008	June 19, 2008	8 episodes; BBFC rating: 18; ACB rating: MA15+
The Complete Sixth Season	September 5, 2006	September 22, 2008	September 18, 2008	8 episodes; BBFC rating: 18; ACB rating: MA15+
The Complete Series (Seasons 1–6)	September 5, 2006	September 7, 2009	TBA	Released as Special Edition (U.S.); Released as The Emerald City Collection (UK); 56 episodes; BBFC rating: 18; Re-released in UK on February 3, 2014

=== Soundtrack ===
Avatar Records released a soundtrack containing East Coast, West Coast, and Southern hip hop on January 9, 2001. It peaked at #1 on the Billboard Soundtrack Charts, #42 on the Billboard 200, and #8 on the Top R&B/Hip-Hop Albums. The soundtrack featured the song "Behind the Walls" recorded by Kurupt & Nate Dogg.

== Sequel film ==
On May 1, 2024, the 16-minute short film Zo was released on YouTube. Set over 20 years after the series' end, it portrays a tense phone conversation between Tobias Beecher and Ryan O'Reily, both now out of prison for different reasons. The film stars Lee Tergesen and Dean Winters (reprising their roles from the series) and was written by longtime Oz showrunner Tom Fontana.

== Sources ==
- Season 1, Episode 2, DVD Commentary on "Oz: The Complete First Season."
- Season 2, Episode 5, "Oz: The Complete Second Season."
