= Vernon Schillinger =

Fictional character

- Oz character
- First appearance: The Routine (1997)
- Last appearance: Exeunt Omnes (2003)
- Portrayed by: J.K. Simmons

In-universe information
- Nicknames: Vern; Schillinjer; Schallenger; Challenger
- Affiliation: Aryan Brotherhood
- Family: Heinrich Schillinger (Father); Greta Schillinger (Sister)
- Children: Andrew Schillinger; Hank Schillinger
- Relatives: Jewel Schillinger (Granddaughter)
- Nationality: American

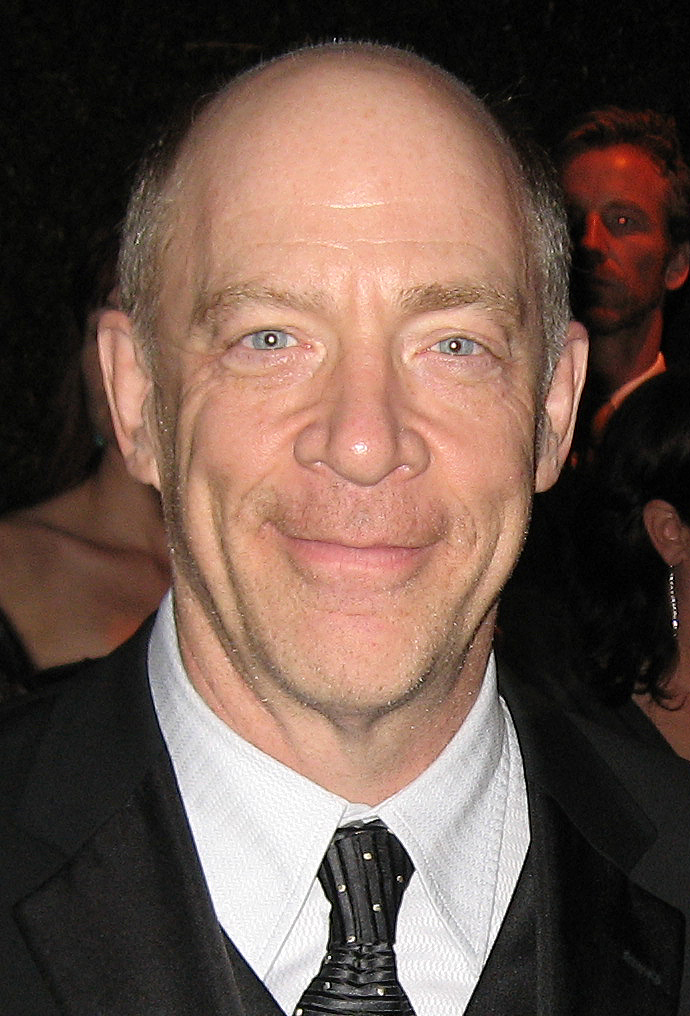
JK Simmons depicted Schillinger in the series

Vernon Schillinger is a fictional character played by American actor J. K. Simmons on the HBO series Oz and the main antagonist.

Schillinger is one of the most powerful and feared inmates in Oswald Maximum Security Penitentiary ("Oz"). As a leader of Oz's Aryan Brotherhood, Schillinger controls most white inmates and has a reputation for ruthless brutality and rape. He is shown to be a high-ranking member of the Brotherhood outside of prison, thus giving him power outside of Oz through a vast network of allies.

== Character overview ==
"Prisoner #92S110: Vernon Schillinger. Convicted October 21, 1992 - Aggravated assault in the first degree. Sentence: Eight years, up for parole in five."

Schillinger is the head of the Aryan Brotherhood inside the Oswald Maximum Security Penitentiary ("Oz"). An ardent racist, he is serving an eight-year sentence for aggravated assault for attacking an African-American drug dealer with a crowbar for selling drugs to his sons. He indulges in varying degrees of sexual sadism, especially toward fellow inmate Tobias Beecher, whom he rapes to "initiate" him into prison life. In addition to Beecher, Schillinger commits several acts of rape over the series against weaker white inmates; ironically, he is virulently homophobic. He is also quick to have the Brotherhood murder other inmates to prove that the Aryans are a legitimate threat to the rest of Oz's inmate population.

Throughout the series, Schillinger has several major family issues: his father, whom he hates, taught him everything he knows about white supremacist ideology; his sons are both amoral drug addicts; he disowned his sister for marrying a Jew, and his daughter-in-law is a prostitute. Many of his underlings are imprisoned for hate crimes and readily affiliate themselves with his group. Despite his status as a leader, he seeks approval from his superiors such as former mentor Wilson Loewen, who views him as having "a big ego and no balls to back it up." A running gag in the show revolves around his surname: Schillinger strongly objects to his name being mispronounced, averring that it should be pronounced with a hard "G" sound ("Schilling - ur"), not a soft "G" sound ("Schillin - jur"). Few characters throughout the show's run pronounce it properly. Ironically, Kareem Saïd, his biggest rival and bitter enemy, is the one character who always pronounces his name correctly.

=== Season 1 ===
Schillinger is among the inmates in the specialized Cell Block E, or "Emerald City." After Tobias Beecher is threatened by his larger African American cellmate, Simon Adebisi, the initially harmless-looking Schillinger offers to let him move into his "pod." Beecher naively accepts the offer, unaware that Schillinger is a prison rapist who intends to turn Beecher into a sex slave, or "Prag." As a result, Schillinger rapes Beecher once he is inside the cell and burns a swastika on his right buttock. Schillinger subjects Beecher to a series of rapes and humiliations, most notably forcing him to perform in drag for a prison talent show. To cope with the constant trauma, Beecher begins using heroin, much to Schillinger's disgust.

Schillinger forces Beecher to wear a T-shirt bearing a Confederate flag in hopes that Beecher will be killed by African-American inmates. However, after taking some PCP, Beecher flies into a rage and throws a chair at Schillinger, shattering a window in Schillinger's cell and temporarily blinding him in one eye. After Unit Manager Tim McManus transfers Schillinger to the prison's general population, he threatens Beecher in the gym. Beecher reacts fiercely, beating Schillinger unconscious with free weights before defecating on his face in front of other inmates. Schillinger realizes how vulnerable he is and tells McManus how badly he wants to be paroled in his upcoming review. McManus reluctantly allows him to move back into Emerald City.

Throughout this season, Schillinger is wary of the high-profile leader of the Muslim prisoners, Kareem Saïd, because of his ability to gain access to and sometimes influence McManus and other prison officials. He fears that Saïd could mobilize the African American inmates in a takeover of the prison. These fears come true when a prison riot breaks out in Emerald City, during which Schillinger lies low, allowing biker inmate Scott Ross to command his Aryan troops. During the riot, Schillinger sees correctional officer Diane Whittlesey murder Ross after the SORT team supplies her with a gun.

=== Season 2 ===
When law school dean Alvah Case investigates the riot, he offers Schillinger a letter of recommendation for parole. Despite this, Schillinger uses his knowledge of Ross' killing to blackmail Whittlesey as he is desperate to be paroled and return to his sons, who have been kicked out of their residence by their Grandfather. After Emerald City is reopened, Beecher begins taunting and threatening Schillinger in the hopes of ruining his chance at parole. When Schillinger approaches other prisoners to try and hire one of them to kill Beecher, they all make fun of him for being too frail to handle his own dirty deeds. More stress on Schillinger comes from outside, when his father Henrik reveals that both his sons are stealing money to fuel their drug addiction, resulting in them being kicked out angering Schillinger, who orders his father to find them but is refused. As soon as Beecher becomes aware of Schillinger's deeds, he works with Whittlesey and McManus to have the parole hearing halted and an additional 10 years added to Schillinger's sentence for the murder plan. Schillinger is permanently removed from Emerald City.

Once in Oz's general population, Schillinger is brutally attacked by numerous African American inmates, who taunt him about Beecher defecating on him. He takes the initiative to fill the Aaryan's leadership vacuum, rallying fellow Aryan, Mark Mack, decide to randomly kill a non-white inmate to win back respect for the Brotherhood, targeting Jewish inmate Alexander Vogel. Warden Leo Glynn cannot find any evidence to conclusively tie the murder to the Aryans, who were not prosecuted for the crime. As a result, the Aryans are once again feared in Oz and Schillinger renews his plans for revenge against Beecher. He employs Chris Keller, a bisexual serial killer who once served time with him in another prison, to play a sick mind game on Beecher to break him down. As the plan goes forward, Beecher is informed of his wife's apparent suicide, and Schillinger tauntingly implies that he actually arranged her murder. Karl Metzger a CO and Aryaan member is employed at Oz and Vern uses this to his advantage.

Cyril O'Reily, the intellectually disabled brother of Irish inmate Ryan O'Reily, arrives in Oz and is put on Schillinger's cell block. Schillinger promises to take Cyril to see his brother in Emerald City but instead orchestrates his gang rape by the Aryans. When Ryan realizes what has happened, he orders Cyril to assault him so he can be sent to solitary confinement, isolated but safely away from Schillinger. After his release, Cyril suffers flashbacks and nightmares about his sexual assault. Meanwhile, Keller seduces Beecher and gets him to relapse into alcoholism. Schillinger, Keller, and Aryan Brotherhood prison guard Karl Metzger ambush Beecher, revealing Schillinger's revenge plan and breaking his arms and legs.

=== Season 3 ===
When Augustus Hill testifies against Malcolm Coyle for murdering an innocent family, Saïd asks Schillinger, among other inmates, to help protect him. Schillinger agrees because he also is a family man and respects the fact that a member of the victims family died while serving in the Vietnam War when Antonio Nappa mentions this. Nappa has Coyle murdered to ensure a message is sent to the Homeboys. Guard Sean Murphy starts a boxing tournament in Emerald City, to which Robson agrees to compete for the Aryans. Schillinger taunts Cyril about the gang rape before he fights Robson, but Ryan pours chloral hydrate in Robson's water, thus allowing his brother to win the match. Afterward, the Aryans leave Cyril alone.

Schillinger's son Andrew arrives in Oz for his part in the lynching of a black man. Schillinger, upset that Andrew is a heroin addict, tells the Brotherhood to ignore his son until he is clean. Ryan, Keller, and Beecher devise a plan to turn father and son against each other. Beecher befriends Andrew as he helps get him off drugs, angering Schillinger. When he embraces his son for fighting his addiction, Andrew rejects his father's ideology and they fight in the cafteria with other inamtes and guards having to separate them. Feeling that Andrew has betrayed him, Schillinger arranges for his own son to die of a drug overdose in solitary, having guard Len Lopresti, a white supremacist who sympathizes with the Brotherhood, secretly provide Andrew with a highly potent package of heroin that kills him. Feeling guilty over Andy's demise Beecher has his father's law firm locate Schillinger's other son Hank, in an attempt to bury the hatchet. Schillinger is nearly sent to death row after Richie Hanlon, who he forced to take the blame for Vogel's murder, claims they did it together. He is murdered by Russian Nikolai Stanislavsky, who mistakenly believes he is avenging the death of his friend Vogel, unaware Schillinger was the actual culprit.

Beecher, after counseling from Saïd, tells Schillinger that Andrew's death was a setup. Schillinger attacks Beecher, who is now protected by Keller and the Muslims. Schillinger and Beecher both ended up in the hospital ward as a result of mutual stab wounds. When Schillinger is discharged, he realizes that Adebisi is plotting something against the white inmates. He asks all the other whites, including Beecher and Keller, to form a bond of solidarity — albeit only a temporary, opportunistic one — to prevent the blacks from taking over the entire prison. As another race riot is brewing, Glynn locks down the prison.

=== Season 4 ===
When Schillinger's younger son Hank visits him in prison, Schillinger pays him to kidnap Beecher's children as revenge for Andrew's death. Schillinger pays Jewish inmate Eli Zabitz to help frame Keller for the kidnapping, turning the two against each other, and has Hank remove the hand of Beecher's son Gary and ship it to Oz. Hank then kills Gary. Father Ray Mukada begs Schillinger to give up Beecher's daughter, after telling him Beecher had him found to make up for Andrew's death.. Hank returns Holly and is arrested by the FBI. Despite Schillinger's concerns about being given up on an interrogation, Hank is freed from the murder charges on a legal technicality. Unbeknownst to Schillinger, however, Beecher hires the Italians to murder Hank.

Hank's wife, Carrie, visits and informs Schillinger that he is going to become a grandfather. Schillinger asks Sister Peter Marie to be involved in the interaction sessions, much to Beecher's surprise. During the session, however, Schillinger is taken to Glynn's office and told that Hank's body has been found in Massachusetts. Convinced Beecher is behind his son's death, he enlists Robson to kill his old foe. However, Keller takes the blame. Schillinger delivers the news to Carrie during a visit, the stress causes her to go into labour, Schillinger and Dr Nathan aid in the delivery of his Grandchild. He is initially overjoyed, until a Black pimp, Curtis Bennett, comes to Oz and tells Schillinger that Hank allowed him to pimp out Carrie, whose clients included Black men. Cloutier counsels for him to be patient and get evidence furious, Schillinger forces Carrie to get a paternity test.Schillinger and the Aaryans launch an offensive against the Sicilians for Hank's death, defeating them and has Robson shank Pancamo, who Schillinger is informed set up his son's murder, nearly killing him. When Peter Scibetta attempts retaliation he Robson and another Aryaan gang rape Scibetta and hospitalise him, boasting about it with other inmates over their repaired pool table.

Mukada suspects Schillinger is the father of Shirley Bellinger's miscarried baby; Schillinger denies this, but admits to being attracted to Bellinger. Before Robson is put on trial for murder that he encouraged, Schillinger sends the accomplice, Carl Jenkins a disturbing letter, with pictures of lynching, that drives him to commit suicide. He also warns Jerimiah Cloutier to not interfere in the brotherhoods affairs, after he at Said's urging encouraged Jenkins to cooperate and name Robson. After being released from solitary Saïd in anger savagely attacks and beats Robson, sending him to the prison infirmary, Zahir Arif prevents Schillinger from helping by knocking him unconscious, forcing Glynn to consider putting Oz on lockdown. Schillinger orders other Aryaans to carry weapons and travel in pairs, Arif acting for Said who is in solitary, orders the Muslims to do the same, Schillinger agrees to a truce between the Muslims and the Aryans. Schillinger tries to use the Aryans and Bikers to sabotage Beecher's chances for parole, leading to a warning from Saïd. When Beecher's parole is denied, Schillinger attempts to rape him, Saïd then stabs and nearly kills both him and Robson.

=== Season 5 ===
Carrie proves Hank is the father of her baby, but is killed in a bus accident on the way to Oz. The baby survives and is sent to live with Carrie's parents in Montana. Schillinger is left devastated at this loss as it means he has no one to visit him. Cloutier is also murdered by Timothy Kirk depriving Schillinger of any positive influence to curb his tendencies and moderate him. Sister Pete averts an Aryan–Muslim war by arranging mediation sessions between Beecher, Saïd, and Schillinger. In one session Beecher admits to abusing alcohol and heroin, Saïd admits to previously using heroin and crack cocaine, while Schillinger proudly claims he has never used drugs. When discussing homosexuality, Schillinger and Saïd denounce it as a "perversion", but Saïd points out that Schillinger has previously raped Beecher and Cyril O'Reily, among others. Schillinger denies it, provoking an enraged Beecher to attack him. Schillinger offers Beecher a job delivering mail to Keller in exchange for allowing new prisoner Adam Guenzel, a family friend of Beecher's, to be left at the mercy of the Aryans in Unit B. Beecher accepts the offer after Guenzel throws homophobic slurs at him upon learning of his relationship with Keller, allowing Guenzel to be beaten and gang raped following his transfer.

An FBI agent informs Schillinger that he strongly believes Pancamo orchestrated the murder of Schillinger's younger son Hank. The Aryans attacked the Italians in the gym with Robson stabbing Pancamo, who is hospitalized. Peter Schibetta seeks revenge and asks Saïd for help. Saïd refuses, saying Schibetta's previous rape by Adebisi cannot change Schibetta's reputation. The other Italian mobsters agree and decide not to move against the Aryans without Pancamo's order. Schibetta goes after the Aryans alone attempting to stab Schillinger, when he and Robson go to pick up their damaged pool table, after they taunt him with racial slurs and references to being raped by Adebisi. Schillinger, Robson, and another Aryan beat and gang-rape Schibetta over the pool table, during the rape Schillinger taunts Schibetta about comparing Schillinger's penis size to Adebisi's. Schibetta is returned to the psych ward, while the Aryans now get a good laugh when playing with their repaired pool table.

Meanwhile, Robson has to get his gum tissue replaced. Schillinger suggests that Robson see Dr. Faraj, the Muslim prison dentist. In retaliation for Robson's racist insults, Faraj replaces Robson's tissue with that of a Black man. When word gets out, Aryan leaders on the outside order a reluctant Schillinger to kick Robson out of the Brotherhood. Beecher, feeling remorse about what happened to Guenzel, attempts to get Sister Pete to talk to him. Guenzel is later killed after Schillinger convinces him to escape. Beecher testifies against Schillinger, who is moved to solitary confinement. Before this happens, Schillinger tasks Wolfgang Cutler, a prospective Aryan member, to kill a Black inmate. Cutler targets Saïd, but is instead attacked and nearly killed by Black inmate Omar White. Following Wolfgang's death, Latino inmate Miguel Alvarez has been left everything in his will, Schillinger makes clear Alvarez is to hand it all over to Cutler's widow Cathy Jo. Which Alvarez does, after becoming suspicious about Cathy Jo's visits and discovering from an Aaryan that they are having a relationship. He has associates outside prison threaten her not to come back and has Alvarez beaten up, this is the last straw for Miguel, who after losing his parole appeal to a zealous Latino on the parole board, who doesn't like him for being a criminal spirals into drugs.

=== Season 6 ===
Schillinger is released from solitary, on the condition that he does not rape any more inmates. He immediately orally rapes Franklin Winthrop, who offers to kill Beecher's father Harrison, who had been visiting Oz to help Keller overturn his murder conviction, if he can join the Aryans. Schillinger accepts, and Winthrop kills Beecher's father after paying the guards to lock him in a corridor. Meanwhile, a family friend of Schillinger's, Mayor Wilson Loewen, faces trial for reportedly assisting the Ku Klux Klan in murder of two young Black girls in 1963. The trial leads to a full-scale race riot in the city, which spreads into Oz, putting the entire prison in lockdown. When the lockdown is over, Loewen is sent to Oz and put in Unit J with Beecher.

When Beecher saves Loewen from choking, Schillinger is so grateful that he agrees not to interfere with Beecher's parole. However, Beecher (unaware of Loewen's ties to the Brotherhood) rebuffs Schillinger and tells him it was simply his "instinct" to help Loewen. When Keller intervenes in Beecher's parole and gets him sent back to Oz, Schillinger decides to call a truce with Keller. Despite Beecher saving Schillinger's idol, the truce is ultimately undone when Loewen expresses regret for supporting Schillinger, having learned of his vendetta against Beecher. In addition, Loewen tells Schillinger that he never really liked him. When Loewen is murdered Schillingers response is indifference.

Ryan and Cyril's father, Seamus O'Reily, is sent to Oz for murder. He unsuccessfully attempts to have Schillinger kill Jahfree Neema, a Black inmate who is dating Seamus' ex-girlfriend. Schillinger refuses due to his long-time rivalry with the brothers and annoyance at seams not pronouncing his name correctly. Seamus attempts to murder Jahfree himself, but is instead stabbed with his own knife and put in the prison hospital, while Jahfree is sent to solitary. Schillinger is visited by his sister whom he had disowned for marrying a Jewish man and expresses regret upon seeing pictures of his nephews and nieces whom he can never have a relationship with due to his White Nationalist beliefs. She also reveals that that she is in touch with his Granddaughter's relatives sending money occasionally and leaving him with photos of Jules's birthday, revealing their father is dying and to which Vern responds uncaringly. In a desperate attempt to win back Beecher's love, Keller switches prop knives during the prison production of Macbeth, in which both Schillinger and Beecher have been cast, as Macbeth and MacDuff respectively. Beecher unwittingly stabs Schillinger in the play's climactic scene. New warden Martin Querns and Sister Pete conclude that Schillinger's death was an accident.

Due to the deaths of Schillinger, Scott Ross, Mark Mack, Wolfgang Cutler and other Aryan lieutenants and James Robson transfer to Unit F, due to contracting HIV, the Brotherhood is reduced to pulling mail room duty; all are wiped out when an anthrax shipment is delivered to Oz, from Chris Keller to prevent retaliation against Beecher in the series finale.

== Reception ==
TV Guide included him in their 2013 list of The 60 Nastiest Villains of All Time and Rolling Stone has ranked him number 22 of the "40 Greatest TV Villains of All Time".
