= Chuck Zito =

American actor (born 1953)

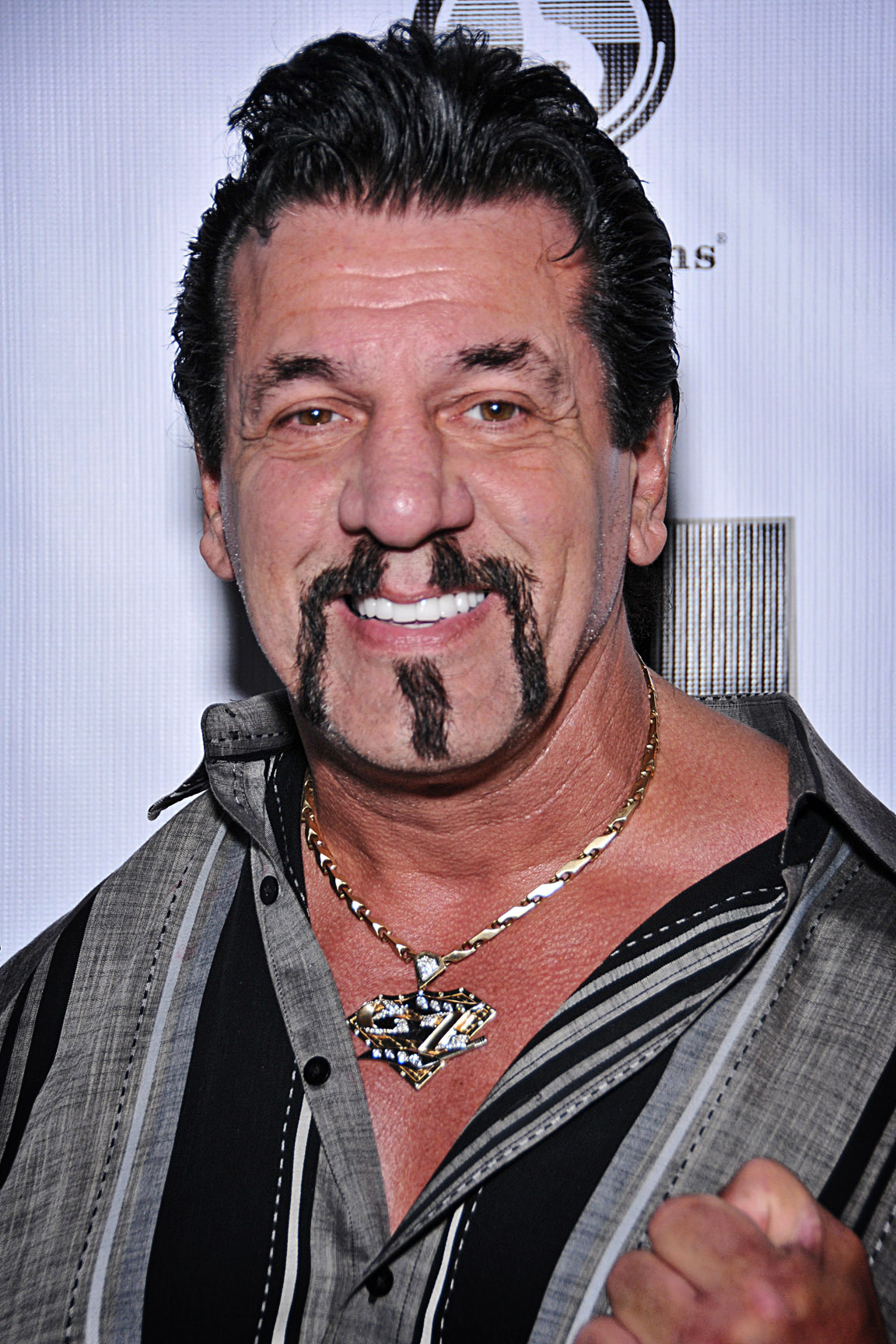
- Zito in West Hollywood, California in 2013
- Born: Charles Alfred Zito Jr. March 1, 1953 (age 73); New York City, U.S.
- Occupations: Actor; boxer; bodyguard; martial artist; stuntman
- Years active: 1982–present
- Spouse: Kathy (?–?; divorced)
- Zito's voice On becoming a Hells Angels member First published April 23, 2013

Charles Alfred Zito Jr. (born March 1, 1953) is an American actor, stuntman, celebrity bodyguard, and former outlaw biker. Zito was a member of the Hells Angels for 25 years and served as vice president of the New York City charter and president of the New York Nomads chapter. After entering Hollywood as a celebrity bodyguard, Zito was a film stuntman before finding a breakout acting role as mobster Chucky "the Enforcer" Pancamo on the HBO television series Oz (1997–2003), which he played for five seasons. He followed this up with numerous other "tough guy" roles, such as in Sons of Anarchy (2012). Zito has also been a ringside boxing reporter, professional wrestling manager, and radio personality.

== Early life ==
Zito was born in the Bronx, New York City, the second of three children of Charles Zito Sr. and Gloria Frangione. His grandparents were Italian immigrants to the United States. Zito was raised in the Bronx and New Rochelle. The son of a professional welterweight boxer, Zito was taught at an early age how to fight and defend himself. His father boxed under the ring name Al LaBarba and fought in 228 professional matches. At the age of seventeen, Zito dropped out of New Rochelle High School and married his high school sweetheart, Kathy. He later received his high school equivalency diploma while imprisoned at the Federal Correctional Institution, Petersburg. His involvement with the Hells Angels motorcycle club eventually led to their divorce. Zito became a refrigerator mechanic. He also worked as a bouncer at Café Central on the Upper West Side of Manhattan.

== Boxing and martial arts ==
Zito was an amateur boxer for several years. He trained out of the Southside Boys Club in New Rochelle and Cage Recreation in White Plains, and held an amateur boxing record of 36–5. Zito had his first boxing match aged 12. At 17, he fought his first of four career Golden Gloves bouts when he knocked out Joe Pratt at 1:50 of round two of a preliminary bout in the 147 pounds (67 kg) sub-novice division of the 47th annual New York Golden Gloves, held at the Felt Forum on January 30, 1973. Zito then defeated Michael Nesbitt in the tournament's third round at the Audubon Ballroom on February 19, 1973, before losing to Orlando Nieves in the fourth round of the competition at the Felt Forum on February 23, 1973. He returned to the Golden Gloves on February 2, 1978, losing to Gaylord Bryant at the Felt Forum in the 160 pounds (73 kg) open division. Zito was later the boxing coach of Mickey Rourke.

Reflecting on his boxing career in 2003, Zito said: "I tried to follow in my father's footsteps... but didn't have the desire and willpower to train 100 percent for the fight game. I didn't take it serious enough... When I found out I was fighting I'd go to the gym like two days before the fight. I never trained. I never got out and did my roadwork. I had so many distractions in my life, growing up at the same time. I think I could have been champion if I stuck with boxing." He further stated in a 2006 interview: "I got married young, at 17, and I had other things on my mind, but I wish I had gone pro, I would have been a good fighter". Zito began studying martial arts at the age of 18 and earned black belts in six different disciplines, including jujutsu. He claims to have broken his nose nine times and his hands eight times.

The combat sports reporter Thomas Gerbasi wrote that Zito "has achieved celebrity status in the fight game" as "a fixture at fights in and around the New York Tri-State area", remarking that "to the fighters, he's one of the guys". He developed friendships with Arturo Gatti, Vinny Pazienza and Mike Tyson. Zito first met Gatti in 1996 and accompanied the boxer to the ring for several high-profile fights. He was seen with Cuba Gooding Jr. and Dwayne Johnson at the Lennox Lewis vs. Mike Tyson pre-fight party on June 8, 2002, at the Memphis Pyramid.

In 2003, Zito began his career as a broadcaster with a role as a ringside reporter on Monday Night Fights broadcasts on HBO. He was also a correspondent at the Affliction: Day of Reckoning mixed martial arts event on January 24, 2009.

Zito owns a dojo, Chuck Zito's Street Survival School, in Pelham, New York.

== Hells Angels ==
A motorcycle enthusiast, Zito established the New Rochelle Motorcycle Club in 1974, which later merged with the Bronx-based Ching-a-Ling Nomads. As vice president of the Ching-a-Ling Nomads, Zito was arrested on June 14, 1975, along with club president Pedro Lamboy, on charges of harassment and possession of dangerous weapons relating to the alleged harassment of James Hunter, a tenant of a storefront near the Ching-a-Ling Nomads' clubhouse. On October 7, 1976, an apartment in New Rochelle which had been rented to Zito by landlord Arthur Jacobs was targeted in an arson attack two days after the lease was broken due to a dispute between Jacobs and Zito caused by Zito's membership in the biker club. Zito was also charged with assault after allegedly attacking a police officer with a bar stool during a bar brawl on June 12, 1977.

Zito met Sandy Alexander, a professional boxer who was the president of the New York City chapter of the Hells Angels, while they both trained at the Gramercy Gym on East 14th Street in Manhattan. Zito convinced the membership of the Ching-a-Ling Nomads to become prospective members of the Hells Angels, but only he and one other Ching-a-Ling biker were ultimately recruited by the Angels. Explaining what inspired him to join the club, Zito said: "I used to watch their movies like Hells Angels on Wheels and Hell's Angels '69 as a kid. They were the elite of the elite, the No. 1". His nickname in the Hells Angels was "Charming Chuck".

According to prosecutors, one membership requirement of the Hells Angels' New York City chapter was that prospective members must kill or attempt to kill a target selected by the club as part of an initiation process. Zito allegedly earned his membership in the Hells Angels by attempting to murder Robert Giangarra, a Queens pizzeria owner and low-level mobster who had previously shot and injured Hells Angels member Cortland "Chip" Candow in a Manhattan bar. According to testimony from John Joseph "Pirate" Miller, a Hells Angel-turned-government witness, Zito and another biker, Philip "Lightfoot" Kramer, used a remote-controlled device from a model airplane to detonate C-4 explosives attached to a vehicle belonging to Giangarra. On May 9, 1979, Giangarra survived without serious injury when a bomb attached to the undercarriage of a Cadillac Eldorado he was sitting in exploded in the driveway of his home in Elmhurst, Queens. Zito, along with Kramer, was voted in as a full member of the New York City Hells Angels on May 10, 1979. The police were unable to locate Giangarra afterwards, and Zito was never charged with the bombing.

On August 2, 1979, police discovered a stolen pistol, ammunition and brass knuckles in a borrowed car being driven by Zito after he was stopped for speeding in Harrison, New York. He pleaded guilty to third-degree criminal possession of a weapon and was sentenced in White Plains County Court on April 23, 1980, to five years on probation. Zito's other convictions included criminal possession of a controlled substance (Quaaludes), and disorderly conduct. The Federal Bureau of Investigation (FBI) began monitoring Zito's "meteoric rise" in the Hells Angels and labelled him "a rising star in a dangerous and well-established criminal organization". After attaining the rank of vice president in the New York City charter, Zito assisted in the formation of the Hells Angels New York Nomads chapter in November 1984 and became the Nomads' founding president. The Nomads chapter, which is based in the Hudson Valley, was allegedly formed after some members became frustrated with restrictions on narcotics distribution imposed by senior members of the New York City charter. Zito served as president of the Nomads chapter for ten years.

According to government informants, Zito and another Hells Angels member, Herbert Reynolds "One-Eyed Bert" Kittel, committed an arson on a building in Mount Vernon, New York, where Zito and Kittel each maintained apartments, on February 6, 1985. The blaze was extinguished by the fire department, and authorities found bottles, jars and cans of kerosene in the apartments. On February 12, 1985, a second fire completely destroyed the building. An insurance investigation determined that the second fire was also the result of arson, and no insurance policies were paid out.

Zito was part of a contingent of twenty American and British Hells Angels who traveled to Japan on April 23, 1985, to assess the suitability of a biker club in Tokyo for potential membership in the organization. The Hells Angels ultimately decided against granting a charter to the Japanese bikers. On May 2, 1985, 133 Hells Angels members and associates were arrested on racketeering and drug trafficking charges after a series of law enforcement raids in fourteen cities across the United States. The indictments were the culmination of Operation Roughrider, a three-year FBI investigation into the club. Fifteen of the arrests took place in the New York metropolitan area, where the New York City chapter headquarters on Manhattan's Lower East Side was raided, and at least one Uzi submachine gun and an undetermined quantity of drugs were seized. Zito's home in New Rochelle was also searched by agents of the FBI, the Drug Enforcement Administration (DEA), and local police.

A warrant was issued for Zito's arrest on charges of selling 15.8 ounces (450 g) of methamphetamine in New York state in November 1984. He and Kittel surrendered to the United States Embassy in Tokyo on July 22, 1985, after they were the subject of a nationwide dragnet by Japanese police at the request of the FBI. On October 14, 1985, the Tokyo High Court approved an extradition request by U.S. authorities. After detaining the pair in the Tokyo Detention House for four months, the Japanese Ministry of Justice released Zito and Kittel into the custody of U.S. Justice Department officials in Tokyo on October 26, 1985. The pair were then extradited on separate commercial flights to New York by U.S. Marshals Service personnel.

After being held at the Metropolitan Correctional Center (MCC) in Manhattan for fourteen months, Zito accepted a plea deal from federal prosecutors in late 1986, pleading guilty to one felony count of drug conspiracy, for which he was sentenced to ten years' imprisonment. Zito has asserted that he was convicted solely on the FBI's claims of possessing a tape of a recorded telephone conversation between him and Kittel discussing a drug deal. He denies that such a conversation ever took place and maintains that he was bodyguarding actor Mickey Rourke on the set of Year of the Dragon in Vancouver at the time of the alleged phone call. On the stigma of being a Hells Angel, Zito has said: "I never did a drug in my life. It's ridiculous to judge a group on the actions of a few". His sentence was reduced to seven years' upon appeal in 1988, and Zito ultimately served six years at nineteen different federal prisons, located in New York, Pennsylvania, Virginia, Louisiana, Alabama, Oklahoma, and Missouri. He was released from prison on April 13, 1990.

Zito was questioned by police in Rockford, Illinois in June 1994, over the shooting of a motorist who cut into a Hells Angels motorcycle procession the day before the funeral of Lamont "Monte" Mathias, the president of the Hell's Henchmen Motorcycle Club who was killed during a biker war with the Outlaws Motorcycle Club. The motorist, who was shot in the leg, refused to press charges. On December 11, 1994, Zito was among a group of twenty Hells Angels arrested at O'Hare International Airport in Chicago by a task force composed of agents from the FBI, the Bureau of Alcohol, Tobacco, Firearms and Explosives (ATF), the Illinois State Police, and the Chicago Police Department Intelligence Unit after an alleged high-speed car chase along the Northwest Tollway. The contingent, which included senior Hells Angels members from across the country, had been attending a meeting in Rockford to formally mark the club's merger of the Hell's Henchmen. The bikers were under surveillance by the task force as they traveled to O'Hare airport in three rented passenger vans at the conclusion of the trip, when the agents lost sight of one of the vans, resulting in what the task force alleged to be a chase. Zito and the two other drivers of the vans which were carrying the bikers were charged with speeding, while the passengers were charged with disorderly conduct. Police found "an undetermined amount of a white powderly substance" but no weapons upon searching the vehicles. The case was dismissed by a judge, and the Hells Angels sued the Chicago police after hiring defense attorney Ron Kuby. The Hells Angels reached a $250,000 out-of-court settlement with the police, of which Zito received a share of $9,000.

On December 15, 2001, Zito was arrested by the Connecticut State Police and charged with first-degree criminal trespass after refusing to remove his Hells Angels "colors" at the request of security staff while attending the John Ruiz vs. Evander Holyfield III boxing match at the Foxwoods Resort Casino in Mashantucket, Connecticut. Zito stated his intention to sue the casino for discrimination, and said: "If a guy walks in here with a Yankees jacket, are you going to make him take it off? This is America, this isn't Russia".

On February 23, 2002, Zito was present at the Hellraiser Ball, a tattoo and motorcycle trade exposition in Plainview, New York, sponsored by the Long Island chapter of the Hells Angels, which was ambushed by dozens of members of the rival Pagan's Motorcycle Club, resulting in one biker being killed and at least ten injured. A Hells Angel was charged with second-degree murder and 73 Pagan members were indicted on federal racketeering charges in the aftermath of the incident.

Zito was a regular patron of the Scores strip club in Manhattan while the club was controlled by the Gambino crime family. According to the Justice Department, the New York Hells Angels have associated in criminality with the Gambino family. Zito attended the funeral of Gambino boss John Gotti in Maspeth, Queens on June 14, 2002. He declined to comment when he was approached by reporters after the wake. Zito had first met Gotti while they were incarcerated together at MCC in 1986.

In 2004, Zito left the Hells Angels, after 25 years of membership in the club, to focus on his acting career. He resigned from the club "in good standing", an option reportedly extended only to the Hells Angels' most respected members.

== Hollywood ==
Following in his father's footsteps, Zito became an amateur boxer and fought in New York Golden Gloves while working manual labor. In 1979, after assisting the bodyguards of actor Robert Conrad at a motorcycle convention at the New York Coliseum, Zito began his own bodyguard agency, Charlie's Angels Bodyguard Service. Zito initially provided protection for actress Lorna Luft and later was hired by her half-sister Liza Minnelli. The actress recommended Zito's service to her plethora of celebrity acquaintances, allowing Zito to quickly develop contacts throughout Hollywood. His other clients included Muhammad Ali, Charles Bronson, Michael Jackson, Sean Penn, Chita Rivera, Eric Roberts, Mickey Rourke, Charlie Sheen, and Sylvester Stallone. Zito's brother-in-law was a policeman, which allowed him to hire moonlighting police officers to bodyguard celebrities at public events which required additional manpower, such as award shows.

In 1979, Zito and 18 other members of the New York City Hells Angels chapter were hired to appear in the film Dead Ringer, starring Meat Loaf and Cher. The film was never released due to litigation. Parlaying his connection with Mickey Rourke, Zito began a career as a stuntman in 1983 when he acted as Rourke's stunt double in the film Year of the Dragon. He later worked on over 50 films such as Nowhere to Run, The Specialist, True Lies, Die Hard with a Vengeance, Heat, Eraser, The Juror and The Rock. Zito acted as stunt coordinator for the first time on Santa with Muscles. He then also began landing small acting roles in films, including Heaven's Prisoners, No Code of Conduct and Gia. In 1996, after a meeting with producer Tom Fontana, Zito joined the HBO prison drama Oz as mobster Chucky Pancamo. He was a cast member until the show ended in 2003, after six seasons.

In 1997, Zito allegedly knocked gossip columnist A. J. Benza unconscious at the Scores strip club in New York after Benza attributed a false rumor to him in his column in the Daily News. Zito is then purported to have punched Jean-Claude Van Damme, who had previously been a bodyguarding client of his, in another incident at Scores on February 5, 1998. Recounting the incident in his autobiography, Zito claims that he suffered a broken hand as a result of striking Van Damme numerous times after Van Damme had told a bouncer at the club that Zito had "no heart" and the bouncer relayed Van Damme's comments to Zito. He reportedly stood over a prone Van Damme shouting: "This ain't the movies! This is the street, and I own the street!". He later added: "If I knew it would have gotten me so much positive publicity, I would have knocked him out 10 years earlier." Zito is also reputed to have delivered two open-handed slaps to the face of actor Gary Busey in a similar incident.

Owing to his "tough guy" image, Zito had a short role as a professional wrestling manager in World Championship Wrestling (WCW). He appeared on the January 11, 1999 edition of WCW Monday Nitro in Knoxville, Tennessee accompanying Hollywood Hulk Hogan and the New World Order (nWo) to the ring alongside 17 other members of the Hells Angels from the New York, Kentucky, Illinois and North Carolina chapters. In 2002, Zito released his autobiography, Street Justice, co-authored with Joe Layden. He released a self-defense and dieting video, Chuck Zito's Street Survival System, in 2005. Zito appeared in Carlito's Way: Rise to Power the same year. In 2006, he expanded into radio with the show Chuck Zito's View on Howard Stern's Sirius Satellite Radio station. He also hosted Chuck Zito's Italian Bad Boy Hour on WVOX.

In 2010, Zito filed a $5 million lawsuit against the cable network FX, alleging that he had a development meeting with them in 2006, in which he pitched the idea of an outlaw motorcycle group. He alleges that FX blew him off and then stole his idea, which became the FX show Sons of Anarchy. On December 11, 2011, a court judgment was ruled against Zito. Zito appeared in Sons of Anarchy season 5, as Frankie Diamonds. He also appeared in SOA creator Kurt Sutter's Discovery Channel documentary series, Outlaw Empires.

== Personal life ==
Zito has a daughter, Lisa, (who is an entertainment lawyer for Condé Nast in Manhattan) with his ex-wife Kathy. He is a supporter of Donald Trump.

== Filmography ==
=== Film ===
Year	Title	Role	Notes
1982	Dead Ringer	Biker	
1982	1990: The Bronx Warriors	Outlaw Biker	Uncredited
1984	Streets of Fire	Bombers Gang Member	Uncredited
1985	Year of the Dragon	Cab Driver/Cop	Uncredited
1991	Neon City	Bus Attacker	
1993	Nowhere to Run	Prisoner	
1993	New York Cop	Mafia Leader	
1993	Carlito's Way	Club Bouncer	
1993	Love, Cheat & Steal	Jake	
1994	Jimmy Hollywood	Gangster	
1994	Bad Blood	"Toots"	
1994	Sensation	The Bartender	
1994	Love is a Gun	Cop	
1995	Red Line	Dick	
1996	The Juror	Frankie	
1996	Heaven's Prisoners	Tony	
1996	The Funeral	Zito	
1996	Squanderers	Jerry	
1998	Gia	Biker	
1998	Scar City	Guard	
1998	No Code of Conduct	Guard	
1999	Black & White	Chuck	
1999	Me and Will	Biker	
1999	Man on the Moon	Tony Clifton / Biker	
2000	Table One	The Chef	
2001	Street Justice	The Host	
2003	This Thing of Ours	DeGrazio Soldier	
2004	Brooklyn Bound	Anthony	
2004	Coalition	Vinnie	
2005	Remedy	Captain Sallie	
2005	Searching for Bobby D	Freddy "Knuckles"	
2005	The Signs of the Cross	Tony Esposito	
2005	Carlito's Way: Rise to Power	"Buck"	
2005	Tinsel Town	Rubenstein	
2009	Under New Management	Don DeRossi	
2010	13	Ted	
2011	The Grasslands	Matty	
2013	Homefront	Danny "Danny T" Turrie	
2014	Collection	Joe	
2015	The Martial Arts Kid	Frank	
2015	Street Level	Carmine	
2016	Saturday in the Park	Danny "Danny V"	
2016	Female Fight Club	Zeke	
2017	Cops and Robbers	Randy	
2017	Blood Circus	Dominick	
2018	Fury of the Fist and the Golden Fleece	FDA Special Agent	
2018	Black Wake	Sheriff Williams	
2018	King of Newark 2	Big Al	
2018	Treasure Hunter: Legend of the White Witch	Jorge	
2018	Honor Amongst Men	Frank LaCarver	
2018	Father and Father	Udo	Short film
2019	Vault	Joey Bruno	
2020	Mott Haven	Ray Pizzalongo	
2022	Demon Pit	Biker	
2023	The Weapon	Lemmy	
2023	Phoenix	Bullet	

=== Television ===
Year	Title	Role	Notes
1997	New York Undercover	Unknown	Episode: "Hubris"
1998–2003	Oz	Chucky "The Enforcer" Pancamo	45 episodes
1999	WCW Monday Nitro	Himself	Episode: January 11, 1999
2000	V.I.P.	Mikey	2 episodes
2006	The Young and the Restless	Rudy	2 episodes
2006	Law & Order: Criminal Intent	Major Case Squad Detective	Episode: "Tru Love"
2007	Entourage	Himself	Episode: "Malibooty"
2007	Days of Our Lives	Harry Jenks	1 episode
2010	How to Make It in America	Deli Man	Episode: "Crisp"
2012	Sons of Anarchy	Frankie "Diamonds"	8 episodes
2018	Paper Empire	"Big D" Espozito	
2018	Jersey: The Series	"Big Al"	
2021	Gravesend	Carmine	Episode: "Miami Nights"

== See also ==
- Italians in New York City
- Outlaw motorcycle club
