= Simon Adebisi =

- Oz character
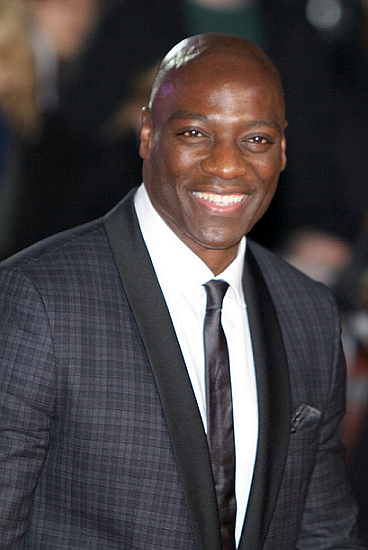
- Adewale Akinnuoye-Agbaje, portrayer of Adebisi
- First appearance: "The Routine" (episode 1.01)
- Last appearance: "You Bet Your Life" (episode 4.08)
- Portrayed by: Adewale Akinnuoye-Agbaje

In-universe information
- Gender: Male
- Title: ID 93A234
- Occupation: Prisoner, drug dealer, gang member
- Nationality: Nigerian

Simon Adebisi is a fictional character played by Adewale Akinnuoye-Agbaje on the HBO dramatic series Oz. Initially a side character, Adebisi later serves as one of the main characters in the first four seasons, beginning with the fourth episode of the first season where he is eventually promoted to leader of the Homeboys gang. After the first half of season four, his character was killed off the show so Akinnuoye-Agbaje could film the movie The Mummy Returns.

A ruthless Nigerian inmate with a penchant for rape, murder and physical intimidation, Adebisi controlled much of the drug trade at one point and is among the most feared and powerful inmates in the prison. Throughout his time in Oz, Adebisi is seen to have both sociopathic and maniacal tendencies, showing little to no remorse for the various atrocities he had committed both in and out of prison. He is also shown to have a severe addiction to heroin, suffering a nervous breakdown due to withdrawals in season 2, for which he is subsequently thrown into the psych ward where his insanity is further explored through various psychotic episodes. Adebisi's character dies in season four, when he is killed by Kareem Saïd in self-defense.

== Character overview ==
"Prisoner #93A234: Simon Adebisi. Convicted May 2, 1993 - Murder in the first degree. Sentence: Life imprisonment without the possibility of parole."

Adebisi is serving life without the possibility of parole for beheading an undercover police officer with a machete four years prior to the events of the first episode. A giant of a man, he often uses physical intimidation to impose his will around the prison, not afraid to assault, rape or even kill anyone who stands in his way. As one of the leaders of the Homeboys (the main black gang in Oz), Adebisi is considered one of the prison's most dangerous inmates, and becomes one of the most recognizable characters on the show. He is well known for his trademark tilted hat, which Akinnuoye-Agbaje suggested was inspired by the "Area Boys" of Lagos, Nigeria.

Adebisi is Nigerian - specifically Yoruba - and speaks with a strong accent, but had lived in America for about 15 years prior to his incarceration. Little else is known of his life before Oz; it is implied on more than one occasion that he was married, though his wife is never shown on screen or mentioned in any great detail. Adebisi is shown to be short-tempered, hedonistic, sociopathic and occasionally psychotic, though, he is also shown to be capable of engineering and executing long-term plans through intellect and manipulation. In one rare instance, he shows compassion; when fellow inmate Bob Rebadow raises $3,000 to send his terminally ill grandson to Disneyland, Adebisi convinces his men not to rob him, remarking "sometimes it is good to be human."

The character had only two lines in Oz's pilot episode, but series creator Tom Fontana liked Akinnuoye-Agbaje's performance so much that by the end of the first season Adebisi became a main character.

== History ==
=== Season 1 ===
Adebisi began as a minor character, a member of the Homeboys and lieutenant of leader Jefferson Keane. He is first shown threatening to rape new cellmate Tobias Beecher on the latter's first night in prison. Like Keane and most of the other Homeboys, he immediately clashes with new Muslim inmate Kareem Said, whose strict religious values oppose the Homeboys' reputation for drug abuse and violence. After Kareem begins to change Jefferson's mind and eventually converts him to Islam, Adebisi remains opposed, calling Said's teachings "bullshit" and continuing to side with the rest of the Homeboys. Following Keane's execution in Episode 4, Paul Markstrom takes over as the new leader of the Homeboys until Adebisi and Kenny Wangler kill him when it is discovered he is an undercover cop. Adebisi then takes over as the new leader and immediately partners in the drug trade with the Wiseguys, the prison's Italian gang. Their boss Nino Schibetta is shown to respect his leadership skills, seeing him as the best drug player among the black inmates. Adebisi, who works in the kitchen and sees himself as the boss, later grows annoyed with Schibetta after he instates Ryan O'Reily as the new boss of the kitchen. O'Reily however immediately begins to plot Schibetta's death, pitching to Adebisi the idea to insert crushed glass into Schibetta's food, which will slowly but painfully kill him. Adebisi agrees and the two form somewhat of an alliance, successfully carrying out their plan over the following weeks as Schibetta is eventually killed in episode 7. In the Season 1 finale, Adebisi, along with O'Reily, Said, Miguel Alvarez and Scott Ross, is one of the leaders of the Emerald City riot, representing the Homeboys. Throughout the episode, Adebisi and the rest of his gang are constantly seen abusing heroin, until they run out and are unable to source any more in the wake of the riot. Adebisi suffers a breakdown from the withdrawal, begging Said for more heroin, or "tits", as it is referred to in Oz; he and the rest of the Homeboys are subsequently tied up and taken prisoner by the other inmates towards the end of the standoff between the inmates and guards. In that episode, it is revealed that Adebisi's crime was exploited to have swept the previous governor out of office and gave Governor James Devlin his opening to reinstate the death penalty, which later resulted in Keane's execution.

=== Season 2 ===
Adebisi continues to suffer severe heroin withdrawal in solitary during the post-riot lockdown. However, he is able to maintain control of the Homeboys when Emerald City reopens. Nino Schibetta's son Peter comes to Oz and learns that Adebisi (from O'Reily to manipulate the Sicillians) is responsible for the death of his father, and is himself poisoned by Adebisi. Schibetta swears revenge and tries to kill Adebisi with help from Chucky Pancamo. In the prison kitchen Adebisi beats up Peter and Pancamo. After knocking out Pancamo, Adebisi brutally rapes a semi-conscious Schibetta. As a result, Schibetta is traumatized and humiliated, telling the authorities he doesn't remember what happened to him. In denial about being raped, Schibetta psychologically and emotionally deteriorates. Subsequently, he is transferred to the Oz prison psych ward.

However, two distractions hold Adebisi's attention: first, his crush on death row inmate Shirley Bellinger, who flirts with him through notes before rejecting him upon discovering that he is black. Secondly, his heroin addiction is out of control. The Italian Mob, seeking revenge for Schibetta's rape, takes advantage of this when new inmate and Mafia boss Antonio Nappa gets Adebisi put into drug rehab through his staff connections. Adebisi is deposed as the head of the Homeboys and cut out of the drug trade through the help of Nappa's former friends. Another Nigerian Yoruba prisoner, an elderly man named Kipekemie Jara, comes to Oz, and begins to rehabilitate Adebisi, but at the same time the stress of the change brings on schizophrenic visions and severe psychosis. The Italians and the blacks consider Jara a threat, so they kill him. The shock and trauma of the event triggers a nervous breakdown in Adebisi and he is moved to the psych ward, placed in a cell right next to Peter Schibetta.

=== Season 3 ===
Adebisi comes out of the psych ward pretending to be a changed man. To prove he is sane, he defends Peter Schibetta from an attacker in the psych ward. This convinces Antonio Nappa that a potential change in heart from Adebisi could prove useful for the Italian mobsters. This is all a ploy, however, as Adebisi takes a job in the AIDS ward as a means of obtaining blood from AIDS patient Robbie Gerth to prick Nappa undetected with an HIV-infected needle. When Dr. Nathan confirms that Nappa is HIV-positive, he is sent to the AIDS ward, and Pancamo assumes leadership of the Italians. From here Adebisi gets ready to take control of the Homeboys once again.

Meanwhile, Kenny Wangler is leading the Homeboys, who no longer trust Adebisi. Adebisi approaches Pancamo about becoming partners in the drug trade. Pancamo initially refuses because he is still angered about the beating Adebisi gave him and Schibetta. However, when Adebisi points out that he could be a strong ally, Pancamo agrees to work with him as long as he gets rid of Wangler. Adebisi then shows his sincerity with a plot to depose current black gang member Wangler by burning the skin of Wangler's allies, Poet and Junior Pierce, while Wangler is away at a funeral. When Wangler arrives back in Oz, he is locked in as Adebisi's cellmate. Adebisi practices various African "warrior training" activities such as hog tying Wangler naked. Adebisi then forces Wangler to accuse Unit Manager Tim McManus of sexual harassment. The claim hurt McManus, as he is already facing a sexual harassment suit from Claire Howell, putting McManus's credibility at further risk.

Adebisi begins to formulate a plan to take over Emerald City and make it "all black." The first step is to convince the impressionable Correctional Officer Clayton Hughes to help his African American counterparts behind bars as opposed to keeping them locked in. Adebisi tells him that his father had also died in Oz and then convinces Hughes that a white inmate murdered his father. Hughes, after seeing a few white officers make racist statements, starts accusing other black staff members, including Warden Leo Glynn, of betraying their own people and working for an oppressive white-run system. Adebisi's second step involved rallying the black inmates as a means of taking over the prison. He engineers a plan which results in the prison guards throwing Augustus Hill in the hole. He exploits the perceived racism of the white officers, in order to stoke tensions and incense the black inmates to riot. Despite opposition from Muslim inmate Kareem Said, the black inmates led by Adebisi begin shouting "Set Hill Free" and start physically confronting both the White inmates and correctional officers. Fearing a riot, Glynn locks Oz down into the new millennium and fires Hughes for being sympathetic to Adebisi's cause. Hughes however leaves Adebisi with a gun on his last day of work.

=== Season 4 ===
After the lockdown, Adebisi manipulates Warden Glynn to let Poet, Pierce, and Wangler back into Em City claiming that the racial situation will rest easier getting them back. He then secretly gives bullied inmate Guillaume Tarrant the gun. Intending to eliminate Wangler, Adebisi leaves the gun under Tarrant's mattress. Tarrant goes on a shooting spree that results in the deaths of multiple inmates, including Wangler and Pierce, and a guard. With four blacks including one correctional officer dead at the hands of a white inmate, Adebisi's goals are accomplished and his plan is set in motion. Glynn fires McManus for overlooking the gun smuggling incident and for singing a racist song, at the memorial of the deceased guard. Raoul Hernandez informs on him, , convinced that the Latinos will move to aid the Whites. Hernandez tells Glynn that Adebisi used the gun to stir up racial tension and that it was given to him by Hughes, Glynn is unable to act as acting on this as doing so, would endanger and imprison Clayton Hughes. Adebisi and Pancamo agree that it is time for Hernandez to die, and use new inmate Enrique Morales to kill Hernandez and take his position as El Norte's gang leader. Meanwhile, a new inmate named Desmond Mobay, who is supposedly Jamaican, wants in with the gangsters. Mobay is actually a narcotics detective named Johnny Basil who is sent in to bust the drug trade in Emerald City. Adebisi is suspicious and opposes having Mobay join as a member their crew. But Mobay comes though and passes every initiation test successfully, eventually gaining their confidence.

Over the course of the season Adebisi, with the help of Zahir Arif, persuades outside community leaders to pressure Glynn into hiring a black man to replace McManus. Glynn is running for Lieutenant Governor, and sees that hiring a black man to run Emerald City is likely to gain him more support from African American voters. Eventually, Glynn does hire a black man named Martin Querns. Querns, himself an ex-drug dealer, is told to rid Emerald City of violence and racial tension. Querns tells the inmates that they may sell and use drugs freely as long as there is no violence. Head guard Sean Murphy, an ardent supporter of McManus, is appalled by Querns' system, especially because it makes Adebisi, Pancamo, and Morales the trustees. Murphy questions Querns' motive in transferring all of the Aryan and Biker inmates out of Emerald City. Querns fires Murphy and instates a black officer Travis Smith as the head of Emerald City. Querns later recommends that Glynn transfer out all of the guards loyal to Sean Murphy also. Glynn allows Querns to transfer all of the white guards with the exception of Claire Howell, who hates McManus. All of the new guards transferred into Emerald City are black, as are all of the new inmates. However, none of these inmates are Muslim. This angers Arif, who had helped Adebisi get a black man to run Emerald City in the first place. The new inmates are also all loyal to Adebisi, who becomes the most powerful and influential inmate in the prison, and is given free rein by Querns as long as he suppresses violent incidents. Adebisi now has the freedom to satisfy all his vices, installing a curtain in his cell and creating his own version of "paradise", although he could not escape the fact that he was still in prison. In time, the Christian and gay gangs, both predominantly white, are replaced by black inmates, and soon the Italian and Latino inmates are deprived of the drug trade. When these two groups are sent to Unit B, two of Adebisi's lieutenants, Poet and Supreme Allah, are named trustees to replace Pancamo and Morales.

At the same time, two of the few white inmates left in Emerald City, Chris Keller and Ryan O'Reily, decide to work together to bring Adebisi and Querns down. Keller murders inmates Nate Shemin and Mondo Browne, and they frame Supreme Allah. This causes Glynn to begin to mistrust Querns, who in turn begins to mistrust Adebisi, who tries to force a confession out of his lieutenant and various others. Adebisi is rattled by these events and begins to distrust his own men.

Said, the re-instated leader of the Muslims, is greatly concerned about the effects of Adebisi's leadership in Emerald City under Querns. Said believes that Emerald City is rapidly becoming an inferno in which black inmates are being mentally poisoned. Noting Adebisi's distrust of his men in light of the murders, Said pretends to join forces with Adebisi with the covert intention of bringing him down. Said learns of Adebisi's video recordings of drug parties in his cell, and resolves to find a way to supply Glynn with this damning evidence of Querns' misconduct.

Adebisi accepts Said's request to move into his cell and voluntarily gives him a video tape to "test his loyalty." However, Said gives the tape to the warden and Querns is immediately fired. When McManus is reinstated as unit manager of Emerald City, he announces Adebisi's transfer out of the prison unit. In retaliation Adebisi tries to kill Said, gaining the attention of McManus, the guards and the prisoners. A large bloodstain splatters on the white curtains of the cell the two share and Adebisi soon emerges, seemingly victorious and unscathed. However, he reveals his injuries by spitting out blood from his mouth and collapsing at the top of the stairs, dead. His death was later ruled as self-defense since Adebisi attempted to murder Said first.
