= Ryan O'Reily =

Character from the television show Oz

- Oz character
- First appearance: The Routine (1997)
- Last appearance: ZO (2024)
- Created by: Tom Fontana

In-universe information
- Title: ID 97P904
- Occupation: Prisoner

Ryan O'Reily is a fictional character in the television series Oz. He was portrayed by Dean Winters from 1997 to 2003 and in the 2024 short film ZO.

== Character overview ==
O'Reily is an Irish-American career criminal, originally sentenced to 12 years to life imprisonment for killing two people while driving under the influence of drugs and alcohol. His sentence was later extended to 40 years to life after he confessed to a murder he committed with his brother, Cyril. Before his incarceration, he led the Bridge Street Gang, with Cyril acting as his lieutenant and bodyguard. After Cyril suffers permanent brain damage in a fight, O'Reily guilt ridden over his involvement embarks on a violent, destructive binge of substance abuse. He shown to care deeply about Cyril and Gloria Nathan.

He is highly intelligent, manipulative, and amoral, surviving in Oz by exploiting rivalries among inmates and forming temporary alliances with various prison gangs. The creator of the series, Tom Fontana, compared him to Iago, the antagonist of William Shakespeare's Othello.

== Fictional history ==
=== Season 1 ===
In the pilot episode, O'Reily is first featured in a flashback where he and friend are exiting a bar, they encounter Dino Ortalani who shoots them wounding O'Reily and killing his friend. When he arrives in Oz he publicly taunts and challenges Ortolani, he bribes a guard, who in solitary confinement allows Johnny Post to set Dino Ortolani on fire, before betraying Post to the Italians. Later in the season, he attempts to orchestrate Jefferson Keane’s death. This plan, however, fails as Keane kills one of his attackers. Scibetta is pleased with the outcome as this causes Keane to be sentenced to death, the Homeboys Adebisi and Wangler to hospitalise Nino's nephew Joey in retaliation. Ryan is then given Joey's position as head of the cafeteria, Scibetta also warns O'Reily to stop his arrangement with the CO Mike Healy who is smuggling in his heroin, as it is cutting into the Scillian's heroin profits. To stay in good graces O'Reily sells out Healy, who is revealed to be a friend of Ryan's brother Cyril and has aided in all of Ryan's plans, without implicating himself, O'Reily sets events in motion in which he and Healy are caught making a transaction. O'Reily refuses to testify against Healy, who is arrested and fired, blame is laid on another inmate who Ryan told about his operation, who then suffers a beating by other officers.

O’Reily then partners with Simon Adebisi in the kitchen, where they scheme together to murder Nino Schibetta. The two feed him ground glass for several weeks, causing him to haemorrhage internally. Upon Schibetta's hospitalisation and eventual death, O’Reily consolidates influence in the prison drug trade. He also supplies Tobias Beecher with heroin, contributing to his addiction and subsequent PCP-induced violent breakdown, during which he attacks and blinds Vernon Schillinger in one eye. He also witnesses Beecher attack Schillinger in the gym with other inmates cheering him on. During the riot he and Biker gang member Scott Ross attack CO's Joseph Armstrong and Eddie Hunt causing severe injuries to Armstrong, whose evacuation to hospital is negotiated by Mcmanus and Glynn.

=== Season 2 ===
O'Reily is diagnosed with breast cancer and undergoes chemotherapy under Dr. Gloria Nathan. He develops romantic feelings for her and arranges for his brother to kill her husband, Preston. Cyril is subsequently caught and imprisoned in imprisoned in Oz, where he is sexually assaulted by Schillinger and the Aryan Brotherhood. McManus refuses to house Cyril in the same Unit as Ryan. He also reveals to the Sicilians that Kepekime Jara, a Nigerian witch doctor and Simon Adebisi who is going through heroin withdrawal regularly converse. Antonio Nappa who is leading the Sicillians, has Jara killed in retaliation for killing his friend Nino and causing his Godson (Nino's son) to have a traumatic mental breakdown. Adebisi, ends up in the psych unit with Scibetta.

When Miguel Alvarez is bullied into attacking and blinding CO Rivera to get into the good graces of Latino leader El Cid. Ryan is found to be the only blood type to match, using this as leverage to save Cyril from Schillinger. In exchange for his brother's transfer, Ryan eventually confesses to orchestrating Preston Nathan’s murder, leading to his own indictment in the crime. Adding further time to his sentence so Cyril is not alone, to cope with life in Oz. It is also revealed that Cyril's brain damage was caused by Ryan's actions, when he instigated a fight with the partner of an ex fling. This led to Ryan feeling guilty and was a catalyst in causing his destructive alcohol fuelled binge which caused his incarceration.

=== Season 3 ===
O’Reily allies with Beecher and Chris Keller against Schillinger. When Schillinger’s son Andrew arrives in Oz, O'Reilly intends to cause him to overdose until Beecer pitches an alternative idea, he pressures him into buying drugs, and later tortures him for refusing. After Andrew publicly humiliates his father and the Aryan Brotherhood by renouncing their racism, Schillinger gives him heroin, resulting in his overdose and death.

O’Reily also develops a friendship with the new CO supervisor, Sean Murphy. During Murphy’s inmate boxing tournament, O'Reily ensures Cyril's victory by drugging his opponents, James Robson, Miguel Alvarez, Chucky Pancamo, and Hamid Khan, with chloral hydrate. He then orchestrates the death of William Cudney, who threatened to expose his actions, by hiring Russian hitman Yuri Kosygin to commit the crime.

At the end of the season, Oz is forced into lockdown because of racial unrest due to Cyril's defeat of Khan. Murphy catches O'Reily as he is about to contaminate the water, but does not report him as on the condition he does not do it again. Ryan comes up with an alternative plan, by triggering Cyril's anger at their abusive father's upbringing effecting his anger, causing Cyril to unintentionally beat Khan so severely that he is left brain damaged and on life support, until his wife orders him removed so he can die peacefully.

=== Season 4 ===
O’Reily and Cyril participate in restorative justice sessions with Dr. Nathan and her late husband’s parents. She is later assaulted by Patrick Keenan and suspects O’Reily arranged it. He falsely claims responsibility and later kills Keenan. O’Reily also manipulates events leading to the dismissal of Unit Manager Martin Querns, restoring Tim McManus as unit manager.

He also has a dispute with Nikolai Stanislofsky over a contraband cell phone, leading to the latter's death at the hands of Officer Claire Howell, with whom O'Reily has a brief sexual relationship. Later, Querns replaces McManus as unit manager and shifts control of Em City toward Adebisi's allies. O'Reily and Keller retaliate by murdering Nate Shemin and Mondo Browne and framing Supreme Allah, which results in Querns' dismissal and McManus' reinstatement.

In the second half of the season, a television crew comes to film at Oz under journalist Jack Eldridge, who had earlier exposed the O'Reilys' crimes. Ryan refuses to cooperate with the filming as retribution. Supreme Allah, released from solitary confinement, threatens O’Reily, who then arranges to have him killed by Tug Daniels. Around this time, Suzanne Fitzgerald visits, claiming to be O'Reily's mother. Despite his initial disbelief, he eventually accepts her after confirmation from his father.

=== Season 5 ===
Jia Kenmin conspires with Li Chen to target the O'Reilys, after Ryan put him in a coma. After hearing Chen intends to hurt his mother Ryan stabs and wounds Chen, who attacks Ryan, leading Cyril to fatally stab Chen during the altercation. This incident is the final straw for McManus who moves Cyril to isolation, due to this being one of many incidents where Cyril has lashed out violently and attacked Staff and Inmates. Cyril is tried for murder, with his family declining to intervene, Cyril is sentenced to the electric chair for Chen's murder and is transferred to death row. Poet reveals to O'Reily from Dr Farraj, that Robson has the cadavers of an African implanted in his mouth, which they reveal publicly in the cafeteria, humiliating Robson and causing his expulsion from the Aryans.

Meanwhile, O'Reily shares a cell with Father Daniel Meehan, who counsels him during Cyril's trial. Upon discovering that Glen Shupe had been bribed to lie, O'Reily orchestrates retaliation with the Latinos, ultimately resulting in Shupe's mutilation and Jia's death at the hands of guards. He then, with Meehan's guidance, begins confronting his childhood trauma and supports Cyril's appeal.

=== Season 6 ===
O’Reily pressures Shupe to confess, but the testimony fails to aid Cyril's defense. Meehan dies of a brain embolism, and O'Reily washes his body in the morgue while reading a passage out of the Bible. Rumors then spread that Peter Schibetta cursed O'Reily. Schibetta boasts to O'Reily that he will do the same to him and everyone Ryan cares about saving him for last. He, however, manipulates Chucky Pancamo into believing Schibetta threatened him as well, as Scibetta has blamed Pancamo previously for his failure, leading the Italians to murder Schibetta.

Cyril's execution is briefly stayed after inmate Jahfree Neema organizes a protest. Despite this, however, Cyril is eventually executed, leaving Ryan devastated. He subsequently begins a romantic relationship with Dr. Nathan.

Later, O'Reily reconciles with his father, Seamus, who expresses remorse for neglecting him and Cyril. He is last seen accompanying Seamus onto a bus during an unknown biological substance attack on Oz.

=== ZO ===
In the 2024 short film ZO, Beecher and O'Reily are shown in their lives after prison. In the intervening years since the evacuation of Oz they have since fallen out. During an inflammatory phone call the once close allies look to be initiating war with each other. It is revealed Ryan is free as the cop who investigated his case is corrupt and the District Attorney is unwilling to pursue criminal charges any further. Seamus is also revealed to have died a few weeks before his release and his mother is elsewhere, it is not known what became of his relationship with Gloria Nathan. Their phone call ends with O'Reily taunting Beecher "once a prag always a prag". Beecher is defiant and willing to fight O'Reily to the bitter end.

== Reception ==
Critics have described O’Reily as “the arch schemer”, “Oz’s resident troublemaker”, and "one of the most appealing characters in the show".
