= Craig Grant =

American poet and actor (1968–2021)

- Born: Craig O'Neil Grant; December 18, 1968; New York City, New York, U.S.
- Died: March 24, 2021 (aged 52); Wilmington, North Carolina, U.S.
- Other name: Craig muMs Grant
- Occupations: Actor, poet
- Years active: 1996–2021

Craig O'Neil Grant (December 18, 1968 – March 24, 2021), also known as Craig muMs Grant and muMs the Schemer, was an American poet and actor best known for his role as Arnold "Poet" Jackson on the HBO series Oz.

== Life and career ==
Grant was born in New York City and raised in the Bronx. His father, Samuel, was a locksmith and carpenter at Montefiore Hospital, and his mother, Theresa (née Maxwell), was a teacher. He attended Mount St. Michael Academy High School, Bronx, New York. He first gained widespread attention as a poet and performer when he was featured in the documentary SlamNation, which followed him and the other poets of 1996 Nuyorican Poetry Slam Team (Saul Williams, Beau Sia and Jessica Care Moore) as they competed at the 1996 National Poetry Slam.

Grant took the name "muMs" when he was 20 and performing in a rap group. Due to retaining traces of a childhood lisp, a friend suggested he call himself “Mumbles”, which Grant shortened to "muMs", as an acronym for "manipulator under Manipulation shhhhhhh!"

In Words in Your Face: A Guided Tour Through Twenty Years of the New York City Poetry Slam, author Cristin O'Keefe Aptowicz wrote of Grant's time in slam poetry, noting his writing "was street poetry at its purest. Thoughtful, precise but not without humor, his work spoke honestly about the life he and his friends and family lived and the city that he loved."

muMs performed his poetry on seasons 2, 3 and 4 of HBO's Def Poetry Jam, and was a member of New York City's LAByrinth Theater Company. In October 2007, muMs played a role in A View from 151st Street, a play about people trying to reconstruct their lives after gunfire.

In September 2014, muMs wrote and performed "A Sucker Emcee", hip-hop and slam poetry, based on his personal recollections.

In February 2015, muMs' play, titled Paradox of the Urban Cliché, about a young couple living in Harlem, was performed at the Wild Project as part of the Poetic Theater Productions's Poetic License festival.

In February 2015, muMs played a role in The Insurgents, a play about rage among the free, brave, and disenfranchised, produced by LAByrinth Theater Company.

Grant guest-starred in the 2016 Netflix series Luke Cage as Reggie "Squabbles", and was featured as a recurring character, Ricardo, on three episodes of Louis C.K.'s web series Horace and Pete. He appeared in two films by Steven Soderbergh, and had supporting roles in films including Bringing Out the Dead, Bamboozled, Birdman, and Good Time.

=== Death ===
Grant died in Wilmington, North Carolina on March 24, 2021, aged 52. His manager, Sekka Scher, said the cause was complications of diabetes.

== Filmography ==
=== Film ===
Year	Title	Role	Notes
1999	Bringing Out the Dead	Voice in Crowd	
2000	Bamboozled	Mau Mau: Hard Blak	
2002	Morning Breath	Grant	Short
2004	Everyday People	Ali	
2005	Dark Water	Platzer's Backseat Client	
2005	On the One	Sharif	
2005	Winning Yesterday	Delivery Man	Short
2007	Interview	Cab Driver	
2007	Rhyme Animal	Shiva	Short
2008	Asylum	-	Short
2008	Ball Don't Lie	Fat Chuck	
2008	Showdown of the Godz	Bernard	Short
2008	The Brooklyn Heist	Moose	
2009	An Englishman in New York	DJ	
2009	The Good Heart	Judge	
2009	Breaking Point	Buster Biggs	
2011	Identical	Chief Grant	
2013	Side Effects	Wards Island Orderly	
2013	Heads Up	Foster	Short
2013	Ice	Doughboy	Short
2014	Birdman	Broadway Man	
2014	Lazarus	Rusty	
2016	A Northern Star	Edna's Nurse	Short
2016	Invisible	Museum Guard	Short
2017	The Price	Iji Upla	
2017	Good Time	Denny	
2017	Sketch	Delivery Man	Short
2017	The Middlegame	Jonathan	Short
2017	Love Beats Rhymes	MuMs da Schemer	
2018	Monsters and Men	Uncle Bobby	
2018	Love Magical	Loan Officer	
2018	The Great Pretender	Barry	
2018	BlacKkKlansman	Jabbo	
2018	Hover	John	
2020	The Whistler	Coach Keickman	Short
2021	No Longer Suitable for Use	-	Short
2021	No Sudden Move	Jimmy	
2021	The Scrapper	Leon	
2022	Life After You	Terry Wright	
2022	Bitcon	-	

=== Television ===
Year	Title	Role	Notes
1997–2003	OZ	Arnold "Poet" Jackson	Recurring Cast
2002	Hack	Omar	Episode: "My Brother's Keeper"
2003	Chappelle's Show	Lysol	Episode: "Mad Real World & Ask A Gay Dude"
2003–05	Def Poetry Jam	Himself	Recurring Guest
2004	The Jury	Curtice Redding	Episode: "Last Rites"
2006	The Sopranos	Mop	Episode: "The Fleshy Part of the Thigh"
2006	Law & Order: Criminal Intent	Cousin Chet	Episode: "To the Bone"
2007	Honesty	Mailman	Episode: "Black Mailman"
2007	Boston Legal	Joseph Washington	Recurring Cast: Season 4
2008	Law & Order	Freddie	Episode: "Challenged"
2009	Cold Case	Zeb 'Zen' Edwards '09	Episode: "Read Between the Lines"
2013	Law & Order: Special Victims Unit	Eddie Baker	Episode: "Beautiful Frame"
2013	East Willy B	Ray	Episode: "Operation Strike Team"
2014	The Knick	Hernia Patient	Episode: "The Busy Flea"
2014	Blue Bloods	Leon Bendix	Episode: "Under the Gun"
2015	Nurse Jackie	Wayne	Episode: "Deal"
2016	Horace and Pete	Ricardo	Recurring Cast
2016	Luke Cage	Reggie "Squabbles"	Episode: "Step in the Arena"
2017–19	She's Gotta Have It	Cash Jackson	Recurring Cast: Season 1, Guest: Season 2
2019	NCIS: New Orleans	Larry	Episode: "Reckoning"
2019	City on a Hill	Truancy Officer	Episode: "It's Hard to Be a Saint in the City"
2020	High Maintenance	Cedric	Episode: "Screen"
2020	Bull	Walter Mora	Episode: "Off the Rails"
2020	The Last O.G.	Reggie	Episode: "Warning"
2020–21	Hightown	Wayne Grasa	Recurring Cast: Season 1, Guest: Season 2
2021	All the Queen's Men	Paul Harold	Recurring Cast: Season 1

=== Video Games ===
Year	Title	Role	
2005	The Warriors	Additional Soldier	
2008	Midnight Club: Los Angeles	Ian	
2008	Grand Theft Auto IV	The Crowd of Liberty City	
2009	Grand Theft Auto IV: The Lost and Damned	DeSean	voice and motion capture

=== Documentary ===
Year	Title	Role
1998	SlamNation	Himself
