= Directing Award Dramatic =

Film award

This is a list of winners for the Sundance Film Festival Directing Award for dramatic features.

== Winners ==
=== 1990s ===
- 1997: Morgan J. Freeman – Hurricane Streets
- 1998: Darren Aronofsky – Pi
- 1999: Eric Mendelsohn – Judy Berlin

=== 2000s ===
- 2000: Karyn Kusama – Girlfight
- 2001: John Cameron Mitchell – Hedwig and the Angry Inch
- 2002: Gary Winick – Tadpole
- 2003: Catherine Hardwicke – Thirteen
- 2004: Debra Granik – Down to the Bone
- 2005: Noah Baumbach – The Squid and the Whale
- 2006: Dito Montiel – A Guide to Recognizing Your Saints
- 2007: Jeffrey Blitz – Rocket Science
- 2008: Lance Hammer – Ballast
- 2009: Cary Joji Fukunaga – Sin Nombre

=== 2010s ===
- 2010: Eric Mendelsohn – 3 Backyards
- 2011: Sean Durkin – Martha Marcy May Marlene
- 2012: Ava DuVernay – Middle of Nowhere
- 2013: Joey Soloway – Afternoon Delight
- 2014: Cutter Hodierne – Fishing Without Nets
- 2015: Robert Eggers – The Witch
- 2016: Daniels - Swiss Army Man
- 2017: Eliza Hittman – Beach Rats
- 2018: Sara Colangelo – The Kindergarten Teacher
- 2019: Joe Talbot – The Last Black Man in San Francisco

=== 2020s ===
- 2020: Radha Blank – The Forty-Year-Old Version
- 2021: Sian Heder – CODA
- 2022: Jamie Dack – Palm Trees and Power Lines
- 2023: Sing J. Lee – The Accidental Getaway Driver
- 2024: Alessandra Lacorazza Samudio – In the Summers
- 2025: Rashad Frett – Ricky
- 2026: Josef Kubota Wladyka – Ha-Chan, Shake Your Booty!

== See also ==
- Academy Award for Best Director
