= List of awards and nominations received by Edie Falco =

List of Edie Falco's awards
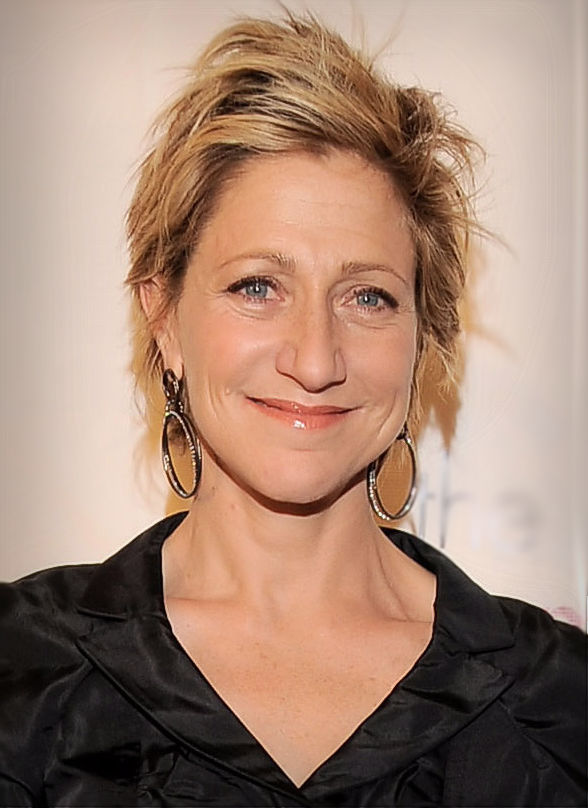
- Falco in 2010
Award	Wins	Nominations
Actor Awards	5	22
Golden Globes	2	11
Primetime Emmy Awards	4	14

The following is a list of awards and nominations received by Edie Falco.

Falco is an American television, film and stage actress, known for her roles as Diane Whittlesey in the HBO series Oz, as Carmela Soprano on the HBO series The Sopranos, and as the titular character of the Showtime series Nurse Jackie. Her work in these television programs have garnered immense critical reception, with Falco receiving two Golden Globe Awards, four Primetime Emmy Awards and five Actor Awards (from a mass twenty nominations total).

Her stage work is also greatly recognized. Falco was the recipient for a Drama Desk Award for Outstanding Featured Actress in a Play and has also been nominated for a Tony Award.

== Major associations ==
=== Actor Awards ===
Year	Category	Nominated work	Result	Ref.
2000	Outstanding Female Actor in a Drama Series	The Sopranos	Won	
2000	Outstanding Ensemble in a Drama Series	The Sopranos	Won	
2001	Outstanding Ensemble in a Drama Series	The Sopranos	Nominated	
2001	Outstanding Female Actor in a Drama Series	The Sopranos	Nominated	
2002	Outstanding Female Actor in a Drama Series	The Sopranos	Nominated	
2002	Outstanding Ensemble in a Drama Series	The Sopranos	Nominated	
2003	Outstanding Ensemble in a Drama Series	The Sopranos	Nominated	
2003	Outstanding Female Actor in a Drama Series	The Sopranos	Won	
2005	Outstanding Female Actor in a Drama Series	The Sopranos	Nominated	
2005	Outstanding Ensemble in a Drama Series	The Sopranos	Nominated	
2007	Outstanding Ensemble in a Drama Series	The Sopranos	Nominated	
2007	Outstanding Female Actor in a Drama Series	The Sopranos	Nominated	
2008	Outstanding Female Actor in a Drama Series	The Sopranos	Won	
2008	Outstanding Ensemble in a Drama Series	The Sopranos	Won	
2010	Outstanding Female Actor in a Comedy Series	Nurse Jackie	Nominated	
2011	Outstanding Female Actor in a Comedy Series	Nurse Jackie	Nominated	
2012	Outstanding Female Actor in a Comedy Series	Nurse Jackie	Nominated	
2013	Outstanding Female Actor in a Comedy Series	Nurse Jackie	Nominated	
2013	Outstanding Ensemble in a Comedy Series	Nurse Jackie	Nominated	
2014	Outstanding Female Actor in a Comedy Series	Nurse Jackie	Nominated	
2015	Outstanding Female Actor in a Comedy Series	Nurse Jackie	Nominated	
2016	Outstanding Female Actor in a Comedy Series	Nurse Jackie	Nominated	

=== Golden Globes ===
Year	Category	Nominated work	Result	Ref.
2000	Best Actress – Television Series Drama	The Sopranos	Won	
2001	Best Actress – Television Series Drama	The Sopranos	Nominated	
2002	Best Actress – Television Series Drama	The Sopranos	Nominated	
2003	Best Actress – Television Series Drama	The Sopranos	Won	
2005	Best Actress – Television Series Drama	The Sopranos	Nominated	
2007	Best Actress – Television Series Drama	The Sopranos	Nominated	
2008	Best Actress – Television Series Drama	The Sopranos	Nominated	
2010	Best Actress – Television Series Musical or Comedy	Nurse Jackie	Nominated	
2011	Best Actress – Television Series Musical or Comedy	Nurse Jackie	Nominated	
2014	Best Actress – Television Series Musical or Comedy	Nurse Jackie	Nominated	
2015	Best Actress – Television Series Musical or Comedy	Nurse Jackie	Nominated	

=== Emmy Awards ===
Primetime Emmy Awards
Year	Category	Nominated work	Result	Ref.
1999	Outstanding Lead Actress in a Drama Series	The Sopranos (episode: "College")	Won	
2000	Outstanding Lead Actress in a Drama Series	The Sopranos (episode: "Full Leather Jacket")	Nominated	
2001	Outstanding Lead Actress in a Drama Series	The Sopranos (episode: "Second Opinion")	Won	
2003	Outstanding Lead Actress in a Drama Series	The Sopranos (episode: "Whitecaps")	Won	
2004	Outstanding Lead Actress in a Drama Series	The Sopranos (episode: "All Happy Families...")	Nominated	
2007	Outstanding Lead Actress in a Drama Series	The Sopranos (episode: "The Second Coming")	Nominated	
2008	Outstanding Guest Actress in a Comedy Series	30 Rock (episode: "Episode 210")	Nominated	
2010	Outstanding Lead Actress in a Comedy Series	Nurse Jackie (episode: "Pilot")	Won	
2011	Outstanding Lead Actress in a Comedy Series	Nurse Jackie (episode: "Rat Falls")	Nominated	
2012	Outstanding Lead Actress in a Comedy Series	Nurse Jackie (episode: "Disneyland Sucks")	Nominated	
2013	Outstanding Lead Actress in a Comedy Series	Nurse Jackie (episode: "Luck of the Drawing")	Nominated	
2014	Outstanding Lead Actress in a Comedy Series	Nurse Jackie (episode: "Super Greens")	Nominated	
2015	Outstanding Lead Actress in a Comedy Series	Nurse Jackie (episode: "I Say a Little Prayer")	Nominated	
2018	Outstanding Lead Actress in a Limited Series or Movie	Law & Order True Crime	Nominated	

=== Tony Awards ===
Year	Category	Nominated work	Result	Ref.
2011	Best Featured Actress in a Play	The House of Blue Leaves	Nominated	

== Miscellaneous awards ==
=== AFI Awards ===
Year	Category	Nominated work	Result	Ref.
2002	Female Actor of the Year in a Television Series	The Sopranos	Won	

=== Independent Spirit Awards ===
Year	Category	Nominated work	Result	Ref.
1993	Best Female Lead	Laws of Gravity	Nominated	

=== Satellite Awards ===
Year	Category	Nominated work	Result	Ref.
2000	Best Actress – Television Series Drama	The Sopranos	Nominated	
2001	Best Actress – Television Series Drama	The Sopranos	Nominated	
2002	Best Actress – Television Series Drama	The Sopranos	Won	
2003	Sunshine State	Best Supporting Actress – Motion Picture	Won	
2009	Best Actress – Television Series Musical or Comedy	Nurse Jackie	Nominated	
2010	Best Actress – Television Series Musical or Comedy	Nurse Jackie	Nominated	
2014	Best Actress – Television Series Musical or Comedy	Nurse Jackie	Nominated	

=== Viewers for Quality Television Awards ===
Year	Category	Nominated work	Result	Ref.
2000	Best Actress in a Quality Drama Series	The Sopranos	Nominated	

== Critic awards ==
=== Dallas-Fort Worth Film Critics Association ===
Year	Category	Nominated work	Result	Ref.
2003	Best Supporting Actress	Sunshine State	Nominated	

=== Los Angeles Film Critics Association ===
Year	Category	Nominated work	Result	Ref.
2002	Best Supporting Actress	Sunshine State	Won	

=== Online Film Critics Society ===
Year	Category	Nominated work	Result	Ref.
2003	Best Supporting Actress	Sunshine State	Nominated	

=== Television Critics Association ===
Year	Category	Nominated work	Result	Ref.
2001	Individual Achievement in Drama	The Sopranos	Nominated	
2003	Individual Achievement in Drama	The Sopranos	Won	
2004	Individual Achievement in Drama	The Sopranos	Nominated	

== Theatre awards ==
=== Drama Desk Awards ===
Year	Category	Nominated work	Result	Ref.
1998	Outstanding Actress in a Play	Side Man	Nominated	
2011	Outstanding Featured Actress in a Play	The House of Blue Leaves	Won	

=== Outer Critics Circle Awards ===
Year	Category	Nominated work	Result	Ref.
2022	Outstanding Actress in a Play	Morning Sun	Nominated	

=== Theatre World Awards ===
Year	Category	Nominated work	Result	Ref.
1998	Theatre World Award	Side Man	Won	
