= Eric Godon =

Belgian actor, director, writer (born 1959)

- Born: 7 February 1959 (age 67); Baudour, Belgium
- Occupations: Actor; director; writer
- Years active: 2002–present
- Website: ericgodon.com

Eric Godon (born 7 February 1959) is a Belgian character actor, director and writer. Recognisable by his burly appearance and deep voice, he is perhaps best known in English language circles for his roles in In Bruges and The Missing.

== Life and career ==
Eric Godon studied Germanic Philology in Brussels, and was once a member of the Belgian Junior national basketball team. He practiced various professions before embarking on a career as an actor at the age of 42. He is largely self-taught, and is well versed in improvisation.

He speaks many languages, which have proven useful in his international acting career. In addition to his native language (French), he is fluent in Dutch, English and German, and reasonable in Spanish, Italian and Russian.

He is pursuing an international career. After Fishing Without Nets, an American independent film by Cutter Hodierne shot in Kenya, he played the character of mayor Georges Deloix in the first series of the BBC drama The Missing. In 2015, he appeared alongside Sean Bean in the recurring role of older Ivanenko in the TNT series Legends, an American TV series produced by Fox 21 for the TNT network. More recently, he played in Luc Besson's movie Anna.. He's been recently playing in Italian, French, Belgian, British, Finnish, Serbian, German, Swedish, Mexican and Spanish productions, in various languages (Italian, Spanish, German, English, Flemish and French)

== Filmography ==
=== Actor ===
Year	Title	Role	Director	Notes
2002	Petites misères	Man In The Car	Laurent Brandenbourger & Philippe Boon	
2002	Tous les chagrins se ressemblent	Commissioner Refaeli	Luc Béraud	TV movie
2003	Dédales	The Gunsmith	René Manzor	
2003	Sauveur Giordano	The Vigil	Pierre Joassin	TV series (1 episode)
2004	Tomorrow We Move	Mover	Chantal Akerman	
2004	Julie Lescaut	The Brutal Employee	Dominique Tabuteau	TV series (1 episode)
2004	P.J.	Alex Mouliet	Gérard Vergez	TV series (1 episode)... Peter Bouckaert, Eric Godon, Kadija Leclere
2004	Avocats & associés	André	Olivier Barma	TV series (1 episode)
2004	Franck Keller	Lab Technician	Stéphane Kappes	TV series (1 episode)
2005	Ultranova	Boss	Bouli Lanners	
2005	De indringer	Victor Philips	Frank van Mechelen	
2005	Comme sur des roulettes	Minou	Jean-Paul Lilienfeld	TV movie
2005	Nom de code : DP	Assidon	Patrick Dewolf	TV movie
2005	Lucile et le petit prince	Starkovsky	Marian Handwerker	TV movie
2005	La battante	Barbier	Didier Albert	TV mini-series
2006	Le Lièvre de Vatanen	Sam Bougreau	Marc Rivière	
2006	Stormforce	Defence Minister	Hans Herbots	
2006	Pom, le poulain	The Driver	Olivier Ringer	
2006	Induction		Nicolas Provost	Short
2006	Ysé		Lionel Jadot	Short
2006	Avec le temps...	Olivier Lutman	Marian Handwerker (2)	TV movie
2006	Trois pères à la maison	Carlos	Stéphane Kappes (2)	TV series (1 episode)
2007	A Secret	Serge Klarsfeld	Claude Miller	
2007	J'aurais voulu être un danseur	Tony	Alain Berliner	
2007	La fille du chef	The Barman	Sylvie Ayme	TV movie
2007	Russian Dolls: Sex Trade	Jean-Paul	Guy Goossens & Mark Punt	TV mini-series
2007	Flikken	Charlie De Kuyper	Rik Daniëls	TV series (1 episode)
2007	Carla Rubens	Victor Reinhart	Bernard Uzan	TV series (1 episode)
2007	Commissaire Cordier	Erwan Sauter	Olivier Langlois	TV series (1 episode)
2007	Septième ciel Belgique	Victor Sauvage	Stéphane Vuillet	TV series (1 episode)
2008	In Bruges	Yuri	Martin McDonagh	
2008	Trouble at Timpetill	Bucher Stettner	Nicolas Bary	
2008	Les insoumis	Johan Pauwels	Claude-Michel Rome	
2008	Complot d'amateurs	Van Der Slagmolen	Vincent Monnet	TV movie
2008	Les poissons marteaux	Pierre's Father	André Chandelle	TV movie
2008	Chez Maupassant	The Commissioner	Jacques Santamaria	TV series (1 episode)
2008	Un flic	Rouvières	Frédéric Tellier	TV series (1 episode)
2008	Sauveur Giordano	School Director	Pierre Joassin (2)	TV series (1 episode)
2009	The Vintner's Luck	Father Lesy	Niki Caro	
2009	Sister Smile	The Bailiff	Stijn Coninx	
2009	Une chaîne pour deux	Richard Arnoux	Frédéric Ledoux	
2009	Combat avec l'ange		Marian Handwerker (3)	
2009	Légende de Jean l'Inversé		Philippe Lamensch & Françoise Duelz	Short
2009	Otages	Delgado	Didier Albert (2)	TV movie
2009	Section de recherches	Louis Marzin	Gérard Marx	TV series (1 episode)
2009	Jes	Hans	Nathalie Basteyns	TV series (1 episode)
2009-2012	A tort ou à raison	Prosecutor Orban	Alain Brunard & Pierre Joassin (3)	TV series (3 episodes)
2010	From Paris with Love	Foreign Minister Francois	Pierre Morel	
2010	Nothing to Declare	Chief Willems	Dany Boon	
2010	The Pack	Jean-Jean	Franck Richard	
2010	Frits and Freddy	René Beurlet	Guy Goossens (2)	
2010	Cannibal	The Gypsy	Benjamin Viré	
2010	Ladyboys		Joel Warnant	
2010	Dominique	The Model Agent	Jim Taihuttu	Short
2010	La marquise des ombres	The Envoy of The King	Édouard Niermans	TV movie
2010	En chantier, monsieur Tanner !	The Notary	Stefan Liberski	TV movie
2010	Tombé sur la tête	Sébastien	Didier Albert (3)	TV movie
2010	Julie Lescaut	Plon	Jérôme Navarro	TV series (1 episode)
2010	Les Bleus	Artiguste	Christophe Douchand	TV series (1 episode)
2010	Dag & nacht	Antoine Chabert	Geoffrey Enthoven	TV series (1 episode)
2010	Vidocq	The Ambassador	Alain Choquart	TV series (1 episode)
2010	Empreintes criminelles	Panama's Man	Christian Bonnet	TV series (1 episode)
2011	The Long Falling	Debacker	Martin Provost	
2011	All Our Desires	Gallois	Philippe Lioret	
2011	The Incident	The Pill Inmate	Alexandre Courtes	
2011	La Chance de ma vie	Dr. Py	Nicolas Cuche	
2011	About a Spoon	The Wishesman	Philippe Lamensch (2)	Short
2011	Kerozene	The Guard	Joachim Weissmann	Short
2011	Il n'y a pas sans toi	The Father	Christophe Johanns	Short
2011	Pasteur, l'homme qui a vu	Napoleon III	Alain Brunard (2)	TV movie
2011	Het goddelijke monster		Hans Herbots (2)	TV series (1 episode)
2011	Braquo	Hugo Christiaens	Philippe Haïm & Eric Valette	TV series (2 episodes)
2012	Erased	Maitland	Philipp Stölzl	
2012	La clinique de l'amour !	Giuseppe Severini	Artus de Penguern & Gábor Rassov	
2012	Innocent Belgium	Louis	Steve De Roover	
2012	10 jours en or	The Slumlord	Nicolas Brossette	
2012	Dépression et des potes	Romain's Father	Arnaud Lemort	
2012	Les hommes plantes	The Supervisor	Boris Kish	Short
2012	Les yeux de la vigne	The Father	Margot Testemale	Short
2012	Que la suite soit douce		Alice De Vestele	Short
2012	Witse	Francis Gastmans	Luc Coghe	TV series (1 episode)
2013	Arrêtez-moi	The Guardian	Jean-Paul Lilienfeld (2)	
2013	Chambre double	The Hotel Receptionist	Mathieu Mortelmans	Short
2013	Salamander	Jean-Jacques	Frank van Mechelen (2)	TV series (5 episodes)
2014	Suite Française	Monsieur Joseph	Saul Dibb	
2014	Fishing Without Nets	Captain Charlie	Cutter Hodierne	
2014	The Connection	Zampa's Lawyer	Cédric Jimenez	
2014	Infiltrant	Di Mateo	Shariff Korver	
2014	Tombville		Nikolas List	
2014	Sacré Charlemagne	The School Director	Adrien François	Short
2014	Août 1914		Fedrik De Beul	Short
2014	Marge d'erreur	Maarten	Joël Santoni	TV movie
2014	Marie Curie, une femme sur le front	Raymond Poincaré	Alain Brunard (3)	TV movie
2014	Aspe	Serge Monbailliu	Jeroen Dumoulein	TV series (1 episode)
2014	De Ridder	Julien Vandenbroeck	Lars Goeyvaerts	TV series (1 episode)
2014	The Missing	Georges Deloix	Tom Shankland	TV series (7 episodes)
2015	Kidnapping Freddy Heineken	The Cop	Daniel Alfredson	
2015	The Ardennes	Gérard	Robin Pront	
2015	Nothing Sacred	Hermes	Morgan Pehme & Dylan Bank	
2015	Johnny Walker	Jean	Kris De Meester & Anton Scholten	
2015	Plein soleil	Haral Willems	Frédéric Castadot	Short
2015	Tom & Harry	President of The Event	Toon Slembrouck	TV mini-series
2015	Vermist	Car Owner	Cecilia Verheyden	TV series (1 episode)
2015	Legends	Older Ivanenko	Several	TV series (5 episodes)
2016	The Unreal Root	Mr. Carlson	Romy Meyer	
2016	Professor T.	Commissioner Cedric Fouchet	Indra Siera	TV series (3 episodes)
2016	Public Enemy	Etienne Gomez	Matthieu Frances & Gary Seghers	TV series (8 episodes)
2017	Pilgrimage	Baron De Merville	Brendan Muldowney	
2017	The Young Karl Marx	The Foreman	Raoul Peck	
2017	Het Tweede Gelaat	Concierge	Jan Verheyen	
2017	Once Upon a Time		Annick Christiaens	Short
2017	The Halcyon	Count Of St Claire	Rob Evans	ITV series (1 episode)
2018	The Most Assassinated Woman in the World	Georges	Franck Ribière	
2018	Monica's List	Policeman	Emmanuel Sapolsky	TV movie
2018	Yummy!	Professor K	Lars Damoiseau	
2018	Le Temps est assassin	Basile Spinello	Claude-Michel Rome	TV series (5 episodes)
2018	Greenhouse Academy	The Henchman	Amir Mann	TV series (8 episodes)
2018	48h- L'affaire Nicolas Charbonnier	Philippe Hittinger	Vincent Trisolini	TV series (1 episode)
2019	Rebelles	Le Belge	Alan Mauduit	Feature film
2019	Anna	Vassiliev	Luc Besson	Feature film
2019	Tsokos	Capitaine Mercier	Hansjörg Thurm	TV series (1 episode)
2019	Freaks out	Gus	Gabriele Mainetti	Feature film
2019	Undergods	Hans	Chino Moya	Feature film
2019	GR5	Pol Martin	Jan Matthys	TV series (6 episodes)
2020	Calibro 9	Gianni	Toni D'Angelo	Feature film
2020	Fils de	Rudy	Franck Prevost	TV series
2021	Diario di Spezie	Clemensau	Massimo Donati	Feature film
2021	The Madame Blanc Mysteries	Father Donadieu	Dermot Boyd	TV series (1 episode)
2021	Onder Vuur	Snake Tamer	Joost Wynant	TV series (1 episode)
2021	Zeppos en het mercatoorspoor	Italian Councilman	Douglas Boswell	TV series
2021	The Bastard Son & The Devil Himself	Henri Ozanne	Rachna Suri	Netflix TV series (2 episodes)
2022
2022	Un homme en fuite	Carbolet	Baptiste Debraux	French feature film
2022	Everybody Loves Diamonds	Interior minister	Gianluca Maria Tavarelli	BBC TV series (1 episode)
2022	World on Fire	Monsieur Berthaud	Meenu Gaur	Amazon TV series (2 episodes)
2023	Estonia	Hermann Abel	Mans Mansson	Swedish TV series (3 episodes)
2023	Great Expectations	Dorget	Brady Hood	BBC TV series (1 episode)
2023	Flikken Maastricht	Erwin Declercq	Pieter van Rijn	Dutch TV series
2023	La abadesa	Demetrio	Antonio Chavarrias	Spanish feature film
2023	Beneath the Houses	older Georges	Neven Rufio	Serbian Feature film
2023	Doktrinen	Sasja	Jens Jonsson	Swedish TV series
2023	Last to Brake	Burek	Simon Kaijser	Finnish TV series
2023	Blutspur Antwerpen	Abel Hoffman	Anna-Katharina Maier	German ARD TV series
2024	The Gringo Hunters	Michael Napoletano	Adrian Grunberg	Netflix Mexican TV series (1 episode)
2024	Jaren van lood	Felix Vrooman	Wim Geudens	Flemish TV series
2026	Vigil	Korotayev	Gareth Bryn / Faye Gilbert	British TV series

=== Director / Writer ===
Year	Title	Notes
2013	Rosa	Short
2013	Marguerite	Short
2013	Emma	Short
