= Fishing Without Nets =

Fishing Without Nets may refer to:

- Fishing Without Nets (2012 film), short film by Cutter Hodierne
- Fishing Without Nets (2014 film), feature film by Cutter Hodierne
