= 3 Backyards =

- Directed by: Eric Mendelsohn
- Written by: Eric Mendelsohn
- Produced by: Rocco Caruso, Amy Durning, Eric Mendelsohn
- Starring: Embeth Davidtz; Edie Falco; Elias Koteas
- Cinematography: Kasper Tuxen
- Edited by: Morgan Faust; Jeffrey K. Miller
- Release dates: January 24, 2010 (Sundance); March 11, 2011 (United States)
- Running time: 88 minutes
- Country: United States
- Language: English

3 Backyards is a 2010 American independent drama film written and directed by Eric Mendelsohn and starring Embeth Davidtz, Edie Falco, and Elias Koteas. It premiered at the 2010 Sundance Film Festival, where it won the Directing Prize, as did Mendelsohn's first feature, Judy Berlin; Mendelsohn is the only director to have won the prize twice.

The film was released theatrically by Screen Media Films on March 11, 2011.

== Plot ==
In a suburban Long Island neighborhood during one autumn day, the lives of three different people intersect. John, an emotionally troubled businessman in an unhappy marriage, decides not to go home when his flight is canceled at the last minute. He instead wanders around town and checks into a motel.

Peggy, a middle-aged housewife, is starstruck when she discovers that a famous actress has moved in next door. When the actress asks Peggy for a ride to the local ferry, a peculiar trip results in a confrontation.

Eight-year-old Christina steals some jewelry from her mother's bedroom and misses her school bus. She decides to walk to school and takes a shortcut through the woods, but ends up in an unfamiliar neighborhood where she is exposed to the dangers of the adult world.

== Cast ==
- Embeth Davidtz as The Actress
- Edie Falco as Peggy
- Elias Koteas as John
- Rachel Resheff as Christina
- Kathryn Erbe as John's Wife
- Peyton List as Emily

== Reception ==
On review aggregate website Rotten Tomatoes, 3 Backyards has an approval rating of 76% based on 17 reviews, with an average rating of 6.7/10.

== See also ==
- List of Sundance Film Festival award winners
