= Danny Leiner =

American film and television director (1961–2018)

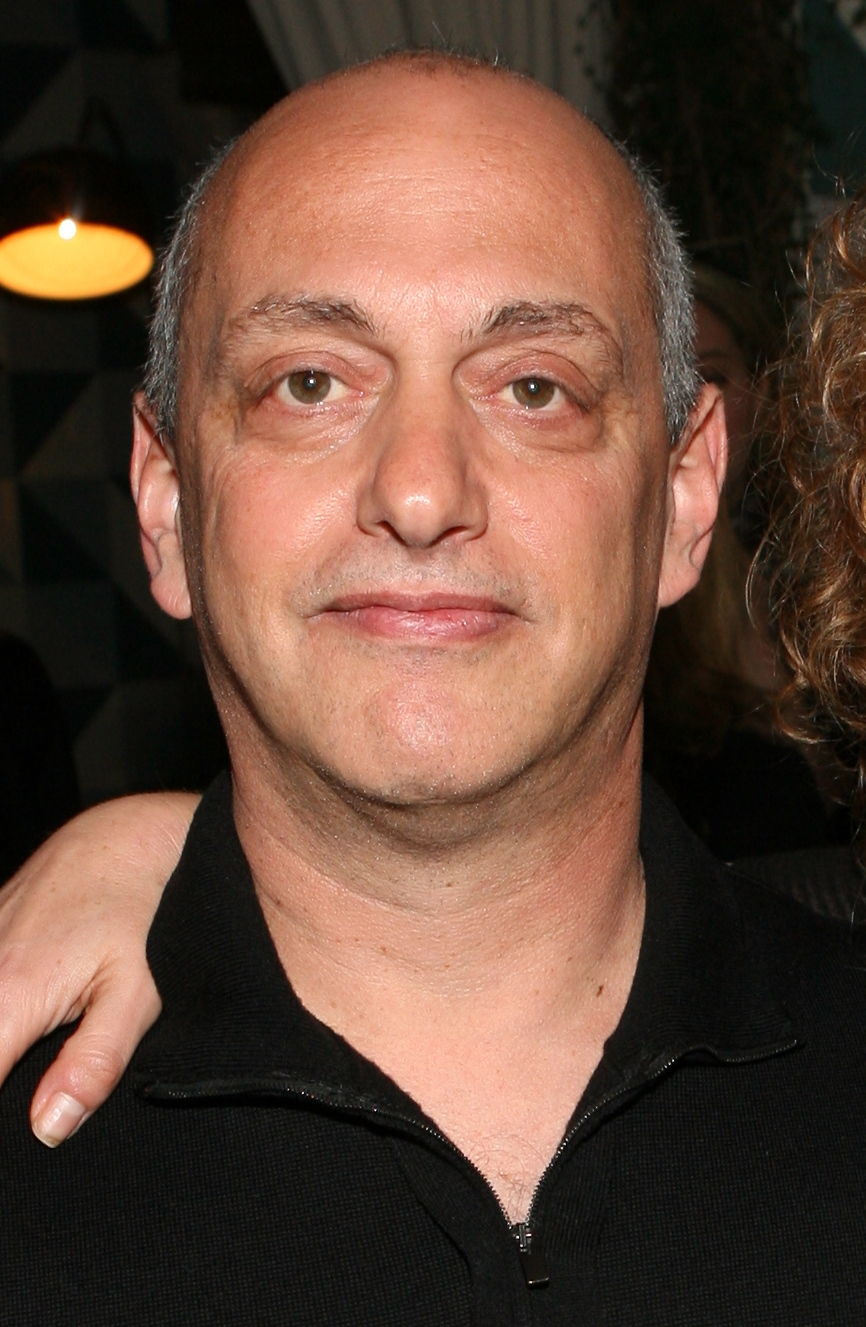
- Leiner in 2011
- Born: May 13, 1961; Manhattan, New York, U.S.
- Died: October 18, 2018 (aged 57); Los Angeles, California, U.S.
- Occupations: Film director, producer, screenwriter
- Years active: 1991–2014
- Notable work: Dude, Where's My Car? Harold & Kumar Go to White Castle

Daniel Leiner (May 13, 1961 – October 18, 2018) was an American film and television director. He is best known for directing the stoner comedy films Dude, Where's My Car? and Harold & Kumar Go to White Castle.

== Early life ==
Leiner was born in Manhattan, New York, in 1961. His parents were Dr. Marvin Leiner, a professor at Queens College, and Anne (Seagall) Leiner, a psychotherapist. He grew up in Brooklyn and Long Island, and attended Purchase College, where he met Edie Falco, who starred in three of his films.

Leiner died from lung cancer on October 18, 2018, at the age of 57.

== Career ==
Leiner's first box office hit was the stoner film Dude, Where's My Car?, which was panned by critics but achieved cult film status and was widely referenced in pop-culture during the 2000s. His next film, Harold & Kumar Go to White Castle, is another stoner comedy which was positively received by both critics and moviegoers. It went on to box office success and became the first installment in a film series.

In addition to film, Leiner also directed a wide range of television shows, including Austin Stories, Remember WENN, Felicity, Strangers with Candy, Action, Freaks and Geeks, Party of Five, Sports Night, Gilmore Girls, The Tick, Everwood, The Mind of the Married Man, Arrested Development and How to Make It in America. He worked again with Edie Falco when directing The Sopranos episode "Luxury Lounge", and also directed The Office episode "WUPHF.com".

== Filmography ==
- Time Expired (Short, 1992)
- Layin' Low (1996)
- Dude, Where's My Car? (2000)
- Harold & Kumar Go to White Castle (2004)
- The Great New Wonderful (2005)
- Gary The Tennis Coach (2009)
- The Young Kieslowski (2014) (producer)
