= Stephanie Pinola =

American film producer

Stephanie Pinola is a film producer and screenwriter based in Los Angeles. She is a graduate of the University of Southern California. Pinola produced the feature film Fishing Without Nets, which won the Best Directing Award in the U.S. Dramatic Category at the 2014 Sundance Film Festival on January 17, 2014.

== Career ==
Pinola was associated with THINK Media Studios. In 2012, The Hollywood Reporter reported that Brian Glazen and Stephanie Pinola of THINK would serve as producers on the feature version of Fishing Without Nets, after Vice joined the project as a producer. Indiewire also listed Pinola among the producers involved in the film's financing and production.

Fishing Without Nets was later screened at the BFI London Film Festival, where Pinola was credited as one of the film's producers. Her later producer credits include Wakefield and Office Uprising.
