= Stiller and Meara =

American comedic duo

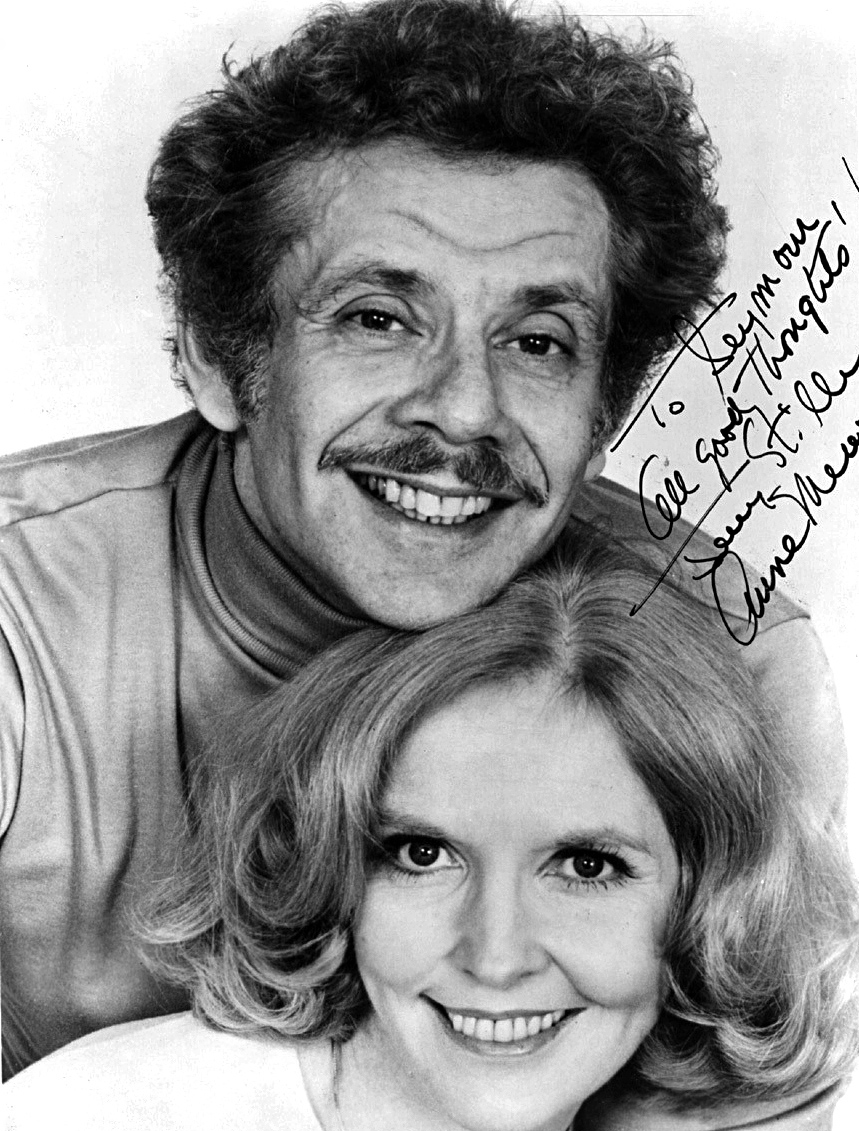
Publicity photo of Jerry Stiller and Anne Meara with an autograph, 1965

Stiller and Meara were a husband-and-wife comedy team made up of Jerry Stiller and Anne Meara that was popular primarily in the 1960s and 1970s. The duo made frequent appearances on television variety shows such as The Ed Sullivan Show.

== Career ==
Stiller and Meara were among the earliest graduates of the Second City improvisational comedy troupe to become famous. When variety shows became scarce in the late 1970s, they had a syndicated short program, only five minutes long, which ran on the NBC affiliate in the Washington, D.C. market immediately after Saturday Night Live. They also created comical radio advertisements. Their advertisements for Blue Nun were so effective that they boosted sales of the wine by 500%. During the mid-1970s Stiller and Meara made a couple of appearances together on the sitcom Rhoda. (Meara was a semi-regular during that show's third season, and Stiller appeared twice, playing her character's ex-husband.)

Anne Meara played Veronica Rooney, a cook on Archie Bunker's Place from 1979 to 1982. She often made wisecracks and gave Archie a hard time. She insisted that Archie also hire her openly gay nephew Fred as a waiter to help him pay for law school. She was an alcoholic and privately pined to reconcile with her ex-husband, Carmine (who appeared in a few episodes, played by Stiller), but knew it wasn't going to happen. Meara appeared sporadically throughout the show's third season and left the show before the fourth and final year.

Stiller and Meara's career declined, however, as variety series gradually disappeared. The duo's own 1986 TV sitcom, The Stiller and Meara Show, in which Stiller played the deputy mayor of New York City and Meara portrayed his wife, a TV commercial actress, was unsuccessful. Stiller had better luck with his next series, playing George Costanza's father in Seinfeld.

Meara and Stiller starred together in A Fish in the Bathtub in 1998.

In 1999 and from 2003 to 2007, Stiller and Meara reunited on several episodes of The King of Queens, on which Stiller played the supporting role of Arthur Spooner.

Comedians and actors Amy Stiller and Ben Stiller are their real-life children.

In 2014, Stiller and Meara provided the voices of a married RV couple in the animated film Planes: Fire and Rescue. It would be the final time they would work together before Meara's death in 2015.

On May 23, 2015, Anne Meara died of a stroke in Manhattan, New York. Prior to Meara's death, the duo starred in a web series from Red Hour Digital, in which they discussed current topics. Jerry Stiller died of natural causes in Manhattan, New York, on May 11, 2020.

== Recordings ==
- Presenting America’s New Comedy Sensations! (1963, Verve V 15038)
- The Sex Life of the Primate (and Other Bits of Gossip) (1963, Verve V/V6-15043)
- Ed Sullivan Presents the Last Two People in the World: Jerry Stiller and Anne Meara (1967, Columbia CL 2742/CS 9542)
- Laugh When You Like – Jerry Stiller & Anne Meara (1973, Atlantic SD 7249, reissued 2005, Collectables COL 6591)
- The Sullivan Years: Comedy Classics (1991, TVT Records TVT-9432-2)

== See also ==
- Stiller & Meara: Nothing Is Lost, a 2025 documentary film about them
