= Todd Waring =

American actor (born 1955)

- Born: April 28, 1955 (age 70); Ballston Spa, New York, U.S.
- Occupation: Actor
- Years active: 1981–present

Todd Waring (born April 28, 1955) is an American actor, best known for replacing Tom Hanks in the roles in both the television series version of Nothing in Common, as well as Splash, Too.

== Early life ==
Waring was born in Ballston Spa, New York.

== Career ==
Waring has played minor roles in various films and television series, including The Stiller and Meara Show, Wings and Star Trek: Deep Space Nine. On NYPD Blue, he portrayed Malcolm Cullinan in a story arc as a rich man who committed murder.

In 2007, he appeared in the short films Wilted, Dr. In Law, Spaghetti, Catch, Oh, Boy., and Keep Off Grass, which were made during the film-making reality series On the Lot. Todd portrayed Todd Scheller, who is John Abbott's ex-cell mate on The Young and the Restless on November 27, 2007.

== Filmography ==
=== Film ===
Year	Title	Role	Notes
1990	Love & Murder	Hal Caine	
2007	Take	Loud Talker	
2016	Heartland	Preacher	
2024	Afraid	Papa	

=== Television ===
Year	Title	Role	Notes
1981	Coward of the County	Luke Gatlin	Television film
1985	The Lucie Arnaz Show	Larry Love	6 episodes
1986	The Stiller and Meara Show	Daniel Bender	Television film
1987	Nothing in Common	David Basner	7 episodes
1987, 1988	The Magical World of Disney	Allen Bauer / Montgomery Daniels	2 episodes
1988	Splash, Too	Allen Bauer	Television film
1988	Duet	Peter Sommerfield	Episode: "His Mother, Myself"
1992	Sinatra	Robert F. Kennedy	2 episodes
1992	Silk Stalkings	Nick Geiger	Episode: "Love-15"
1993	Civil Wars	Warren Perry	Episode: "Alien Aided Affection"
1994	Ellen	William	Episode: "A Kiss Is Still a Kiss"
1994, 1998	Star Trek: Deep Space Nine	Lasaran / DeCurtis	2 episodes
1995	Tom Clancy's Op Center	Lowell Coffey	Television film
1995	The George Wendt Show	Teddy	Episode: "Prom Night: The Return"
1995	First Time Out	Arthur Kurlander	Episode: "Every Pot Has Its Cover"
1995	Maybe This Time	Richard	Episode: "The Catch"
1996	Melrose Place	Don Pierce	Episode: "Run, Billy, Run"
1996	ABC Afterschool Special	Jerry Gallagher	Episode: "Educating Mom"
1996	Murphy Brown	George King	Episode: "Executive Decision"
1996	Champs	Phil	Episode: "It's Must Have Been Gridlock"
1997	Wings	Matthew	Episode: "House of Blues"
1997	Working	John Delaney	Episode: "Pilot"
1997	The Secret World of Alex Mack	Dr. Felker	Episode: "The Doctor"
1998	Alright Already	Mitch	Episode: "Again with the Answering Machine"
1998	Honey, I Shrunk the Kids: The TV Show	Mr. McGann	Episode: "Honey, We're Young at Heart"
1998	Caroline in the City	Steve	Episode: "Caroline and the Big Night"
1999	NYPD Blue	Malcolm Cullinan	4 episodes
1999	Sliders	Mark Einman	Episode: "A Thousand Deaths"
2001	18 Wheels of Justice	Brock Trenton	Episode: "Countdown"
2001	JAG	Capt. Perry Reeves	Episode: "Mixed Messages"
2001	The West Wing	Rep. Rathburn, R	Episode: "Bartlet for America"
2002, 2004	The Guardian	ADA Finneran	2 episodes
2003	Miracles	Phil Bradley	Episode: "The Friendly Skies"
2004	Cold Case	Sean Murphy	Episode: "Glued"
2004	Judging Amy	Ben Hadlock	Episode: "Werewolves of Hartford"
2004	Monk	Maintenance Worker	Episode: "Mr. Monk Gets Fired"
2004	Boston Legal	Daniel Ralston	Episode: "Catch and Release"
2005	Jane Doe: The Wrong Face	Alex Brandt	Television film
2005–2006	Close to Home	Geoffrey Hart	3 episodes
2007	Heartland	Dr. Newell	Episode: "The Places You'll Go"
2007	Final Approach	Greg Adler	Television film
2007	Cane	Senator Barnes	2 episodes
2007–2015	The Young and the Restless	Dr. Barrett / Todd Scheller Jr.	4 episodes
2008	Desperate Housewives	Dr. Martin	Episode: "A Vision's Just a Vision"
2009	Grey's Anatomy	Tobin	Episode: "Elevator Love Letter"
2009	Castle	Dave Ellers	Episode: "Little Girl Lost"
2009	Nip/Tuck	Garth McCloud	Episode: "Enigma"
2009–2011	In Gayle We Trust	Mr. Anderson	10 episodes
2010	Proposition 8 Trial Re-Enactment	Ronald Flynn	Television film
2010	The Good Guys	Steve Maxson	Episode: "The Dim Knight"
2012	Scandal	Peter Nystrom	Episode: "Beltway Unbuckled"
2014–2015	Chasing Life	Bruce Hendrie	9 episodes
2018	The People v. O. J. Simpson: American Crime Story	Lincoln Aston	Episode: "Ascent"
2020–2022	Servant	Frank Pearce	6 episodes
2021	NCIS	Albert James 'Jamie' Beck	Episode: "Collective Memory"
TBA	Imposter	Victor Alberts	Post-production
