= Alicia Shepard =

American journalist and media writer (1953–2023)

- Born: Alicia Cobb Shepard; April 27, 1953
- Died: April 1, 2023 (aged 69); Arlington, Virginia, U.S.
- Education: George Washington University (BA) University of Maryland (MA)
- Occupations: Journalist, writer, professor
- Employer(s): San Jose Mercury News, National Public Radio, Georgetown University, American University, University of Nevada, Las Vegas
- Notable work: Woodward and Bernstein: Life in the Shadow of Watergate
- Spouse: Robert Hodierne (divorced)
- Children: Cutter Hodierne
- Awards: National Press Club media criticism prize (three times)

Alicia Cobb "Lisa" Shepard (April 27, 1953 – April 1, 2023) was an American journalist, media writer and expert on the work and lives of Bob Woodward and Carl Bernstein.

== Career ==
Shepard graduated from George Washington University in 1978 and worked for Scripps League Newspapers until 1982, when she joined the San Jose Mercury News in California.

From 1982 to 1987, Shepard was a reporter for the San Jose Mercury News in California. She was a Times Mirror Visiting Professor at University of Texas at Austin for the 2005–2006 academic year, where she taught a class she designed on Watergate and the press. She spent four years interviewing more than 175 people connected to Bob Woodward and Carl Bernstein and sifting through the new archival materials that the University of Texas bought from Woodward and Bernstein for $5 million in 2003. She is the author of the 2006 book Woodward and Bernstein: Life in the Shadow of Watergate.

She joined National Public Radio (NPR) in October 2007, for a three-year appointment as the Ombudsman for the nonprofit public media organization that ended May 31, 2011. In that role, she said on June 21, 2009, that waterboarding, as practiced by Americans on terror captives, should not be called "torture", although she later mentioned in an interview that "I think that it does...constitute torture".

Shepard taught media ethics at Georgetown University to its masters program from 2007 until 2010. She also taught journalism at American University. In fall 2012, she joined the University of Nevada, Las Vegas (UNLV) faculty as a visiting professor for the Greenspun College of Urban Affairs. In February 2014, she moved to Kabul, Afghanistan to work with Afghan journalists.

In 2020, she and NPR producer Trina Williams co-founded the UJW Angel Scholarship Fund.

=== Torture controversy ===
In June 2009, Shepard, acting in the capacity of NPR Ombudsman, deflected objections to NPR's use of euphemisms such as "enhanced interrogations" as a replacement for the word "torture" in their reporting about waterboarding. She wrote

No matter how many distinguished groups — the International Red Cross, the U.N. High Commissioners — say waterboarding is torture, there are responsible people who say it is not. Former President Bush, former Vice President Cheney, their staff and their supporters obviously believed that waterboarding terrorism suspects was necessary to protect the nation's security. One can disagree strongly with those beliefs and their actions. But they are due some respect for their views, which are shared by a portion of the American public. So, it is not an open-and-shut case that everyone believes waterboarding to be torture.

Shepard said that she personally believed waterboarding was torture in an interview with Bob Garfield of On the Media.

== Awards and recognition ==
Shepard contributed to Washingtonian and People magazines, and wrote for The New York Times, The Washington Post and the Chicago Tribune. For nearly a decade, she wrote for American Journalism Review on such things as ethics, the newspaper industry, and how journalism works - or doesn't. For that work, the National Press Club awarded her its top media criticism prize in three different years. In 2003, she was a Foster Distinguished Writer at Penn State.

The Alicia “Lisa” Cobb Shepard Legacy Foundation was created in her memory.

== Personal life ==
Shepard graduated from George Washington University, with honors in English. In 1987, Shepard, her husband, the photojournalist Robert Hodierne, and one-year-old son, Cutter Hodierne, set sail on their 32-foot sailboat, "Yankee Lady", for the South Pacific. They spent three years cruising in the islands, and she wrote about their adventures. They sailed to Japan and stayed for two more years writing, editing, teaching English and learning Japanese. The couple since divorced.

Shepard received a master's degree in journalism from the University of Maryland in 2002. She has traveled extensively in the U.S. and abroad. In 2002, she bicycled 517 miles from Amsterdam to Paris. Shepard remarried in 2021.

Her son, Cutter Hodierne, is director of the 2012 Sundance Grand Jury prize for the short film, "Fishing Without Nets", about the Somali pirates from their point of view.

Shepard died from complications of lung cancer at her home in Arlington, Virginia, on April 1, 2023, aged 69. Days before her death, she was at work on a memoir, "The Luckiest Unlucky Couple: A Medical Love Story", which her husband, David Marsden, brought to publication in 2026.

== Writings ==
=== Books and articles ===
- The Luckiest Unlucky Couple: A Medical Love Story - personal memoir about a late in life couple who each face separate cancers and experience learning the roles of caregiver and patient as they fall further in love; (2026) ISBN 979-8-216-27005-8
- Woodward & Bernstein: Life in the Shadow of Watergate - about the personal and professional lives of Bob Woodward and Carl Bernstein during and post-Watergate; (2006) ISBN 0-471-73761-5
- Running Toward Danger: Stories Behind the Breaking News of 9/11 (co-author) - about how journalists covered 9/11 and the role they played as modern-day keepers of calm on America's most terrifying day. (2002) ISBN 0-7425-2316-0
- Narrowing the Gap: Military, Media and the Iraq War - Conference Report for the McCormick Tribune Foundation, 2004
- Washingtonian article written by Shepard on Woodward & Bernstein
- Los Angeles Times article written by Shepard regarding Woodward & Bernstein
- Alicia C. Shepard: A belated scoop
- A's for Everyone! (The Washington Post article about grade inflation)
- Thinking Clearly (Shepard wrote a chapter in this book on the Columbine Shootings)
- Uncivil War - article written for the American Journalism Review
- Preparing for Disaster - article written for the American Journalism Review
- Appointment in Somalia - article written for the American Journalism Review
