= Edie Falco =

American actress (born 1963)

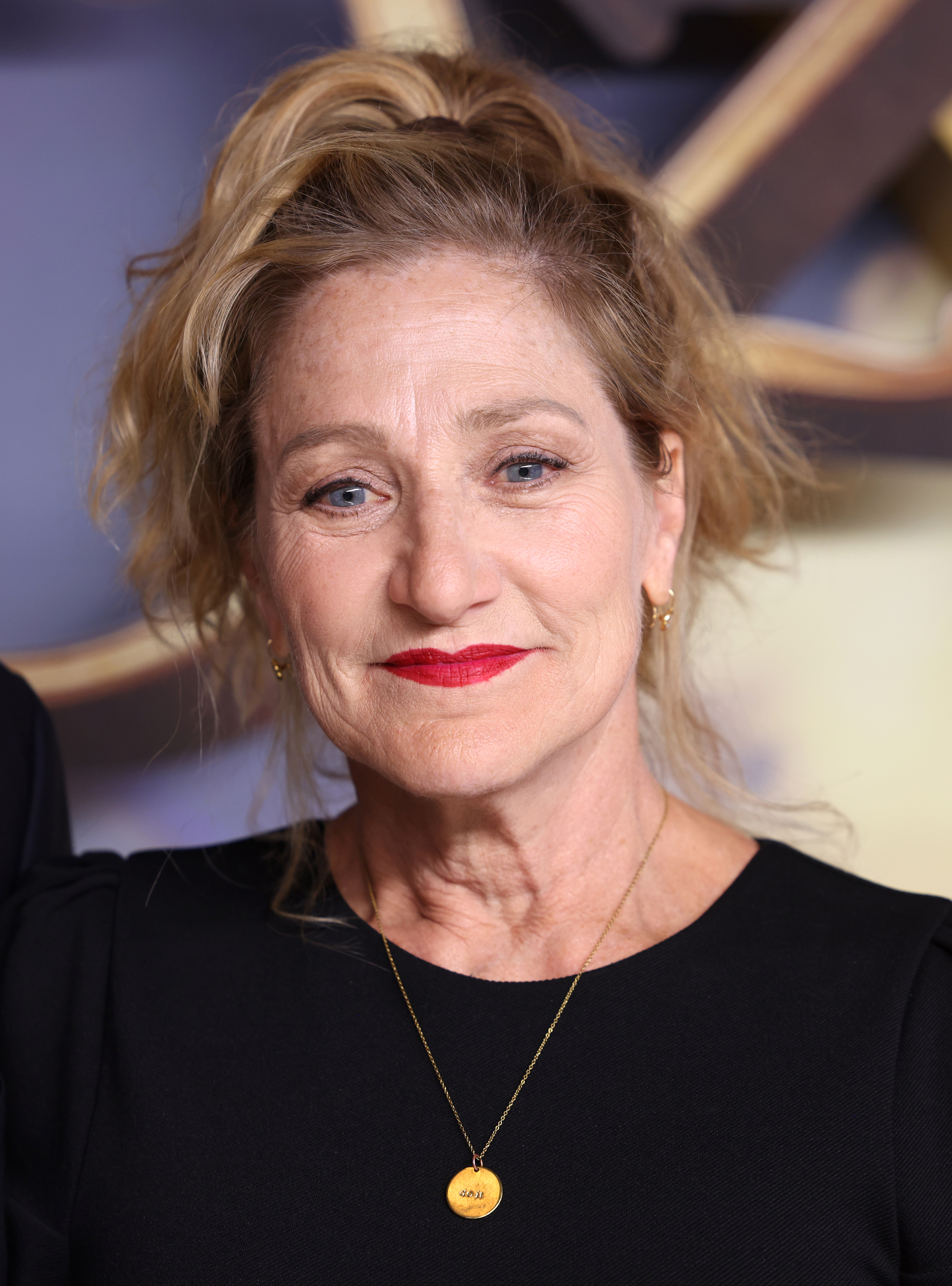
- Falco in 2025
- Born: Edith Falco; July 5, 1963 (age 63); New York City, U.S.
- Education: State University of New York at Purchase (BFA)
- Occupation: Actress
- Years active: 1987–present
- Children: 2
- Relatives: Edward Falco (uncle)
- Awards: Full list

Edith Falco (born July 5, 1963) is an American actress. Known for her performances on stage and screen, she has received numerous accolades including four Primetime Emmy Awards, five Actor Awards, and two Golden Globe Awards, as well as a nomination for a Tony Award. She is the most nominated performer in the Actor Awards history.

Her role as mob wife Carmela Soprano on the HBO series The Sopranos garnered widespread acclaim, and is often regarded as one of the greatest performances in television history, with Falco winning three Primetime Emmy Awards for Outstanding Lead Actress in a Drama Series. She also received a Primetime Emmy Award for Outstanding Lead Actress in a Comedy Series for playing the title role in the Showtime series Nurse Jackie (2009–2015). She was Emmy-nominated for her roles as C.C. Cunningham in 30 Rock (2008) and Leslie Abramson in Law & Order True Crime: The Menendez Murders (2018). She also has acted in the NBC series Homicide: Life on the Street (1993–1997), the HBO prison drama Oz (1997–2000), the web series Horace and Pete (2016), and the FX series Impeachment: American Crime Story (2021).

On film, she made her film debut in the drama Sweet Lorraine (1987). Her film work includes lead roles in Laws of Gravity (1992), for which she was nominated for the Independent Spirit Award for Best Female Lead, Judy Berlin (1999), Landline and Outside In (both 2017), and supporting roles in films including Trust (1990), Bullets Over Broadway (1994), The Addiction (1995), Sunshine State (2002), Freedomland (2006), The Comedian (2016), Avatar: The Way of Water (2022), and Avatar: Fire and Ash (2025).

She made her Broadway debut in the Warren Leight play Side Man (1999). For her role as Bananas Shaughnessy in the Broadway revival of the John Guare play The House of Blue Leaves (2011) she received a nomination for a Tony Award for Best Featured Actress in a Play. She has acted in the Broadway revivals of the plays Frankie and Johnny in the Clair de Lune (2002), and 'night, Mother (2004).

== Early life and education ==
Falco was born in the New York City borough of Brooklyn on July 5, 1963, the daughter of Judith Anderson, an actress, and Frank Falco, a jazz drummer who later worked for an advertising agency. Her father was of Italian descent and her mother had Swedish, English and distant Cornish ancestry. She has two brothers, Joseph and Paul, and a sister, Ruth. Paul is deceased. Her uncle is novelist, playwright, and poet Edward Falco. In 2012, Falco was the subject of an episode of Who Do You Think You Are? which focused on one of her ancestors, a Cornish master mariner from Penzance who was born at sea and died in 1840.

From the age of four, Falco was raised on Long Island, moving with her family to Hicksville, then North Babylon, and finally West Islip. As a child, she acted in plays at the Arena Players Repertory Theater in East Farmingdale, where her mother also performed. Her family eventually moved to Northport, where she attended high school and played Eliza Doolittle in a production of My Fair Lady during her senior year. Falco graduated from Northport High School in 1981. She attended the acting program at State University of New York at Purchase, and graduated in 1986 with a Bachelor of Fine Arts in acting.

== Career ==
=== 1987–1998: Early work and rise to prominence ===
Early in her career, Falco made appearances on television shows like Law & Order and Homicide: Life on the Street. Tom Fontana, executive producer of Homicide, cast Falco as Eva Thormann, the wife of an injured police officer, after watching Falco's performance in Laws of Gravity, a 1992 film directed by Nick Gomez. Fontana said of her, "She's an actress who's unadorned by any embroidery. She does everything with such simplicity and honesty, it's breathtaking." A struggling actress at the time, Falco said her salary from these television episodes paid for one month's worth of rent. She debuted on the big screen in 1987's Sweet Lorraine starring Maureen Stapleton.

Later, she had a small speaking role in the Woody Allen comedy film Bullets Over Broadway (1994). Her friendship with former SUNY Purchase classmate Eric Mendelsohn, who was the assistant to Allen's costume designer, Jeffrey Kurland, helped her to be cast in the role. Mendelsohn went on to direct Falco in his feature film Judy Berlin, for which he won Best Director honors at the Sundance Film Festival. Falco would later go on to star in Mendelsohn's next film 3 Backyards, for which he won Best Director a second time.

During this time, Falco appeared in the films Trust, Cop Land, Private Parts (a nonspeaking part), and Random Hearts. On Broadway, she appeared in the Tony Award-winning Side Man. In 1997, Falco started portraying prison officer Diane Whittlesey, in the HBO prison drama series Oz. Falco got the role after working with Fontana on Homicide.

=== 1999–2008: The Sopranos and acclaim ===
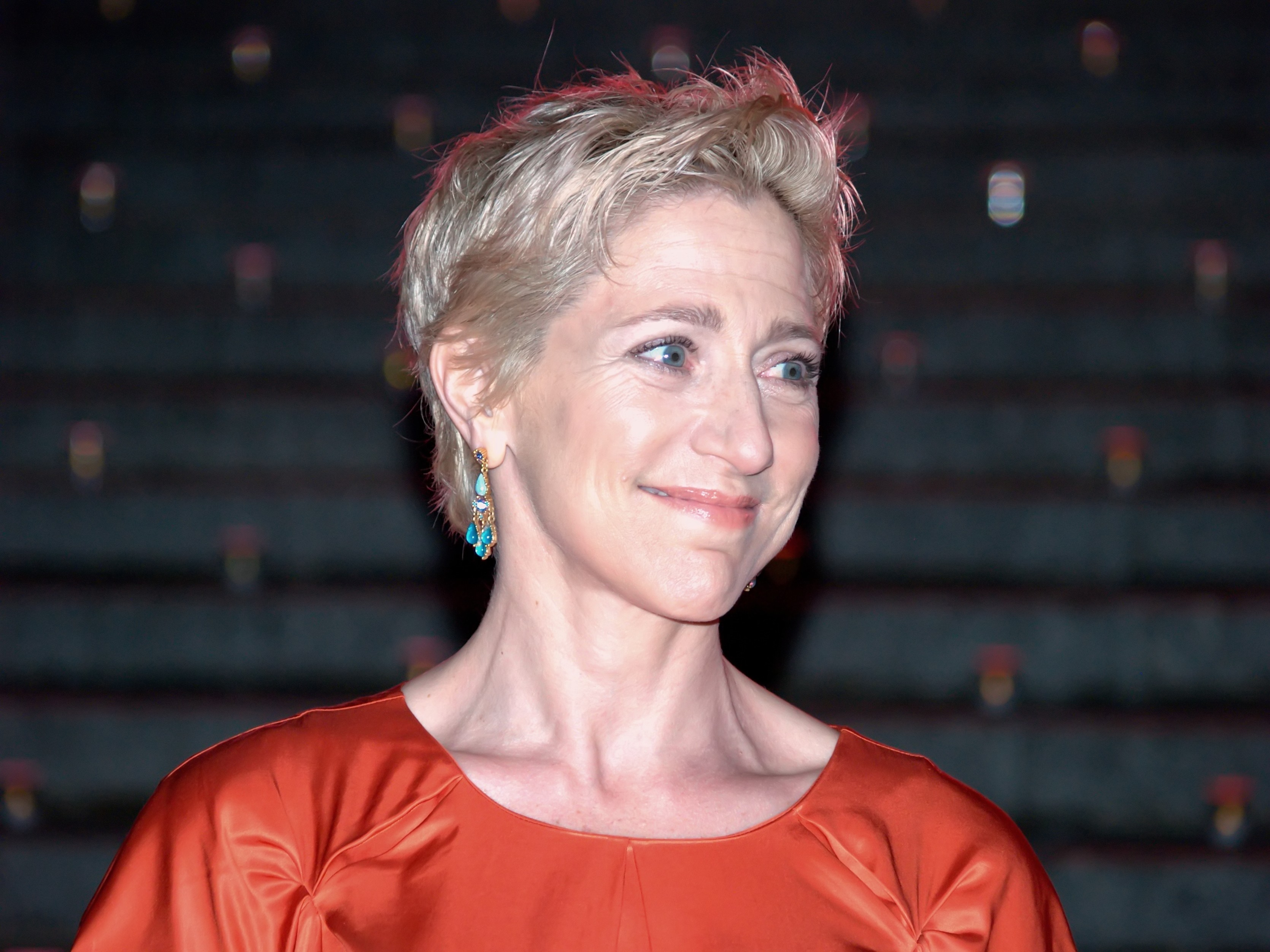
Falco at the 2009 Tribeca Film Festival

Falco landed her breakout role in the HBO drama The Sopranos created by David Chase, which premiered in 1999 and ended in 2007. She portrayed Carmela Soprano, wife of Mafia boss Tony Soprano played by James Gandolfini. The series received wide acclaim, and is often considered to be one of the greatest television series of all time. For her performance on the series, Falco won numerous awards including three Primetime Emmy Awards for Outstanding Actress in a Drama Series for the episodes "College" (1999), "Second Opinion" (2001), and "Whitecaps" (2003). She also earned two Golden Globe Awards for Best Actress – Television Series Drama and five Screen Actors Guild Awards.

As of 2008, Falco, The X-Files star Gillian Anderson, Ugly Betty star America Ferrera, and 30 Rock's Tina Fey were the only actresses to have received a Golden Globe, an Emmy, and a SAG Award in the same year. Falco won these awards in 2003 for her performance as Carmela Soprano during the fourth season of The Sopranos. In the show's final season Alessandra Stanley of The New York Times wrote, "The series has always distinguished itself by the quality of its actors, but this season Ms. Falco depicts even more deeply than before, if that's possible, the full range of a mother and wife's anguish."

During her tenure on The Sopranos, Falco appeared in films such as Freedomland and John Sayles' Sunshine State, for which she received the Los Angeles Film Critics Award for Best Supporting Actress. Falco also guest starred on the television series Will & Grace and had a recurring role on the second season of the NBC sitcom 30 Rock as Celeste Cunningham, the later of which earned her a nomination for the Primetime Emmy Award for Outstanding Guest Actress in a Comedy Series. She appeared in the Broadway revivals of Frankie and Johnny in the Clair de Lune opposite Stanley Tucci, and 'night, Mother opposite Brenda Blethyn.

=== 2009–2016: Nurse Jackie and return to Broadway ===
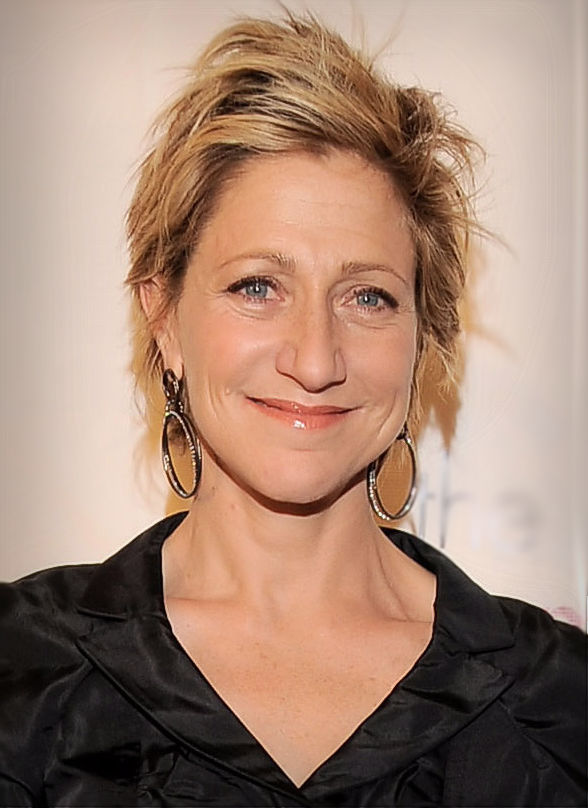
Falco in 2010

Falco starred as the title character, Nurse Jackie Peyton, in the Showtime dark comedy series Nurse Jackie, which premiered on June 8, 2009, and ended on June 28, 2015. For the first season, she won her fourth Primetime Emmy Award, this time for Outstanding Lead Actress in a Comedy Series. She also received nominations for four Golden Globe Awards and eight Screen Actors Guild Awards. Alessandra Stanley of The New York Times wrote, "It's the compelling, enigmatic heroine who holds the errant pieces together. Jackie is not Carmela, but Ms. Falco brings some of Carmela's prosaic manner and harsh certainty to the new role. Jackie has a very dry and mitigating sense of humor, but her righteous streak steers the story."

Falco returned to Broadway portraying the part of Bananas in the revival of the John Guare play The House of Blue Leaves (2011) in New York City at the Walter Kerr Theatre with Ben Stiller and Jennifer Jason Leigh. For her performance, she received a nomination for the Tony Award for Best Featured Actress in a Play. Theatre critic Ben Brantley of The New York Times wrote in his review for the show, that "Ms. Falco endows the anguished Bananas with such unvarnished emotional transparency—and clinical exactness—that it hurts to look at her." Marilyn Stasio of Variety wrote, "Falco is kind of [a] genius...What floors us is Falco's ability to play both comedy and tragedy in the same breath".

It was announced in January 2013 that Falco would star in Liz Flahive's The Madrid off-Broadway. The limited engagement, directed by Leigh Silverman, began previews on February 5 with an official opening on February 26. Along with Falco, the play starred John Ellison, Christopher Evan Welch, Phoebe Strole, and Frances Sternhagen. In 2016, Falco started portraying Sylvia Wittel on the Louis C.K. series Horace and Pete acting alongside C.K., Steve Buscemi, Alan Alda and Laurie Metcalf. The first episode was released on January 30, 2016, on C.K.'s website without any prior announcements. New episodes premiered weekly until the tenth episode was released on April 2, 2016. In the series, Falco portrayed Horace and Sylvia's abused mother. James Poniewozik of The New York Times noted "Louis C. K. is reportedly submitting Horace and Pete for the Emmys as a drama. If it gets a nomination—Mr. Alda, Mr. Buscemi, Ms. Falco and Ms. Metcalf would all be strong picks".

=== 2017–present ===
In September 2017, she began portraying Leslie Abramson in the first season of the NBC true crime anthology series Law & Order True Crime, subtitled The Menendez Murders. The role earned her a nomination for the Primetime Emmy Award for Outstanding Lead Actress in a Limited or Anthology Series or Movie at the 70th Primetime Emmy Awards. That same year she reunited with Louis C.K. for his film I Love You, Daddy (2017) starring C.K., Chloë Grace Moretz, Charlie Day, Rose Byrne, and John Malkovich. The film premiered at the 2017 Toronto International Film Festival. In the film Falco plays C.K.'s long-suffering production manager. The film's release was cancelled after misconduct allegations against C.K. were released by The New York Times. Falco stated of the film's cancellation, "I was sad. I know that he worked very hard on it. He makes his own stuff and puts it out, and I love that chutzpah"; she also added that C.K. deserves a second chance after owning up to his inappropriate behavior.

In 2020, she appeared as the lead character in the Paul Attanasio CBS police drama Tommy. Falco originally reprised her breakout role as Carmela Soprano for the 2021 film The Many Saints of Newark, a prequel to The Sopranos. However, her scenes were cut from the finished film. Falco also starred in the FX true crime series Impeachment: American Crime Story (2021) portraying Hillary Rodham Clinton opposite Clive Owen's Bill Clinton and Beanie Feldstein's Monica Lewinsky. Ines Bellina of A.V. Club wrote, "Falco expertly guides us through a whole smorgasbord of human emotions. From rage to heartache to regret to shame to longing to pride to a pure, pure ache, we ride that emotional roller coaster firmly by her side". In 2023 she played Amy Davidson, a fictional version of Pete Davidson's mother, in his semi-autobiographical series Bupkis on Peacock. It was announced in May 2024 that the series had ended after its first season.

== Personal life ==
=== Relationships ===
In 2002, Stanley Tucci left his family for Falco, with whom he was appearing on Broadway in Terrence McNally's Frankie and Johnny in the Clair de Lune, but the affair ended, and he returned to his wife and children. She adopted a son in 2005 and a daughter in 2008. Falco is a Buddhist.

Falco has been in a relationship with musician Keith Cotton since 2023.

=== Activism ===
She is a vegan and has worked with PETA on projects, including a public-service message urging parents to keep their children away from the circus. She told Parade magazine, "I believe this is at the base of everything bad in society—you can bring it back to cruelty to animals. If you don't have respect for the life of any kind, it will manifest in more obvious ways."

During the 2004 U.S. presidential election, Falco appeared in a 30-second television commercial on behalf of Mothers Opposing Bush in which she said, "Mothers always put their children first. Mr. Bush, can you say the same?" Falco has become the spokesperson for Health Care for America Now and appeared on CNN on June 25, 2009.

=== Health issues ===
Falco has struggled with alcoholism and decided to become sober in the early 1990s after "one particular night of debauchery." She said in an interview that it was difficult to be around the hard-partying cast of The Sopranos, stating, "This cast, in particular, they really love to hang out and party. They make it look like fun. And it was fun for me! They spend a lot more time without me than with me, by my own choice. I'm always invited, and I'm always there for two minutes and I leave, because I can't live in that world anymore. It's too dangerous." She is an advocate of Alcoholics Anonymous' 12-step program.

In 2003, Falco was diagnosed with breast cancer. She chose not to make the news public until the following year.

== Acting credits ==
=== Film ===
Year	Film	Role	Notes
1987	Sweet Lorraine	Karen	
1989	The Unbelievable Truth	Jane the Waitress	
1989	Sidewalk Stories	Woman in Carriage	
1990	Trust	Peg Coughlin	
1991	I Was on Mars	Female Cab Driver	
1992	Laws of Gravity	Denise	
1992	Time Expired	Ginny	Short
1993	Rift	Film Director	
1994	Bullets Over Broadway	Lorna	
1995	Backfire!	Mom	
1995	The Addiction	Jean	
1996	The Funeral	Union Speaker	
1996	Layin' Low	Angie	
1996	Breathing Room	Marcy	
1996	Childhood's End	Patty	
1997	Hurricane Streets	Joanna	
1997	Private Parts	Alison's Friend	
1997	Cop Land	Berta (Bomb Squad Agent)	
1997	Trouble on the Corner	Vivian Stewart	
1997	Cost of Living	Billie	
1998	A Price Above Rubies	Feiga	
1998	Blind Light	Diana DiBianco	
1999	Judy Berlin	Judy Berlin	
1999	Side Man	Terry	Video
1999	Stringer	TV Producer	
1999	Random Hearts	Janice	
2000	Overnight Sensation	Festival Coordinator	
2000	Death of a Dog	Mom	
2002	Sunshine State	Marly Temple	
2005	The Girl from Monday	Judge	
2005	The Great New Wonderful	Safarah Polsky	
2005	The Quiet	Olivia Deer	
2006	Freedomland	Karen Colluci	
2007	Then She Found Me	Herself	
2010	3 Backyards	Peggy	
2013	Gods Behaving Badly	Artemis	
2016	The Comedian	Miller	
2017	Landline	Pat Jacobs	
2017	Megan Leavey	Jackie Leavey	
2017	Outside In	Carol Beasley	
2017	I Love You, Daddy	Paula	
2018	Every Act of Life	Herself	
2018	Viper Club	Charlotte	
2018	The Land of Steady Habits	Helene Harris	
2021	The Disaster Dreams	Monster 1 (voice)	Short
2022	Avatar: The Way of Water	General Frances Ardmore	
2023	The Mother	Eleanor Williams	
2023	Fool's Paradise	The Agent	
2023	I'll Be Right There	Wanda	
2025	Where to Land	Clara	
2025	The Parenting	Dorothy	
2025	Avatar: Fire and Ash	General Frances Ardmore	

=== Television ===
Year	Title	Role	Notes
1993–95	Loving	Nurse Becker	Regular cast
1993–97	Homicide: Life on the Street	Eva Thormann	Recurring cast (season 1), guest (season 3 & 5)
1993–98	Law & Order	Sally Bell	Guest cast (season 3 & 5 & 7-8)
1995–97	New York Undercover	Sgt. Kelly	Recurring cast (season 2), guest (season 3)
1996	The Sunshine Boys	Carol	TV movie
1997	Firehouse	Kate Wilkinson	TV movie
1997–2000	Oz	Diane Whittlesey	Recurring cast (season 1-4)
1999–2007	The Sopranos	Carmela Soprano	Main cast
2000	The Sight	Ghost	TV movie
2001	Jenifer	Wheelchair Saleswoman	TV movie
2001	Who Wants to Be a Millionaire?	Herself/Contestant	Episode: "Celebrity Millionaire 3, Show 1 & 2"
2001	Top Ten	Herself	Episode: "TV Families"
2002	Sesame Street	Herself	Episode: "The Grand High Triangle Lover's Triangle"
2004	Will & Grace	Deirdre	Episode: "East Side Story"
2005–06	Independent Lens	Herself/Host	2 episodes
2006	The Annual Women in Film Crystal and Lucy Awards	Herself/Host	Television special
2007–08	30 Rock	Celeste "C. C." Cunningham	Recurring Cast: Season 2
2009–15	Nurse Jackie	Jackie Peyton	Main cast
2011	America in Primetime	Herself	Recurring cast
2011	Gotham Awards	Herself/Co-Host	Television special
2012	Who Do You Think You Are?	Herself	Episode: "Edie Falco"
2013	Naturopolis	Herself	Episode: "New York"
2015	American Masters	Herself	Episode: "The Women's List"
2016	Match Game	Herself/Panelist	Episode #1.8
2016	Horace and Pete	Sylvia	Main cast
2017	Law & Order True Crime	Leslie Abramson	Main cast
2018	The 2000s	Herself	Episode: "The Platinum Age of Television"
2018	Animals.	Psycho (voice)	Episode: "Roachella"
2020	Tommy	Abigail "Tommy" Thomas	Main cast
2020	Impractical Jokers: Dinner Party	Herself	Episode: "The Food After Da' Club Episode"
2021	Money, Explained	Herself/Narrator (voice)	Episode: "Student Loans"
2021	Impeachment: American Crime Story	Hillary Clinton	Main cast
2023	Bupkis	Amy Davidson	Main cast
2023	The Other Two	Herself	Episode: "Cary Pays Off His Student Loans"
2024	Wise Guy: David Chase and the Sopranos	Herself	Episode: "Part 1 & 2"
2025	Mayor of Kingstown	Nina Hobbs	Main cast (season 4)

=== Theater ===
Year	Title	Role	Venue	Ref.
1998	Side Man	Terry	Classic Stage Company, Off-Broadway	
1999	Side Man	Terry (replacement)	John Golden Theatre, Broadway	
2002	Frankie and Johnny in the Clair de Lune	Frankie	Belasco Theatre, Broadway	
2004–2005	'night, Mother	Jessie Cates	Royale Theatre, Broadway	
2010	This Wide Night	Lorraine	Peter Jay Sharp Theater, Off-Broadway	
2011	The House of Blue Leaves	Bananas Shaughnessy	Walter Kerr Theatre, Broadway	
2013	The Madrid	Martha	New York City Center - Stage I, Off-Broadway	
2018	The True	Dorothea "Polly" Noonan	Alice Griffin Jewel Box Theatre, Off-Broadway	
2021	Morning Sun	Charley	New York City Center - Stage I, Off-Broadway	
2024	Pre-Existing Condition	A	Connelly Theater, Off-Broadway	
2026	Pre-Existing Condition	A	Greenwich House Theatre, Off-Broadway	

== See also ==
- List of American film actresses
- List of American television actresses
- List of people with breast cancer
- List of Primetime Emmy Award winners
- List of Golden Globe winners
