= Cutter Hodierne =

American Filmmaker (born 1986)

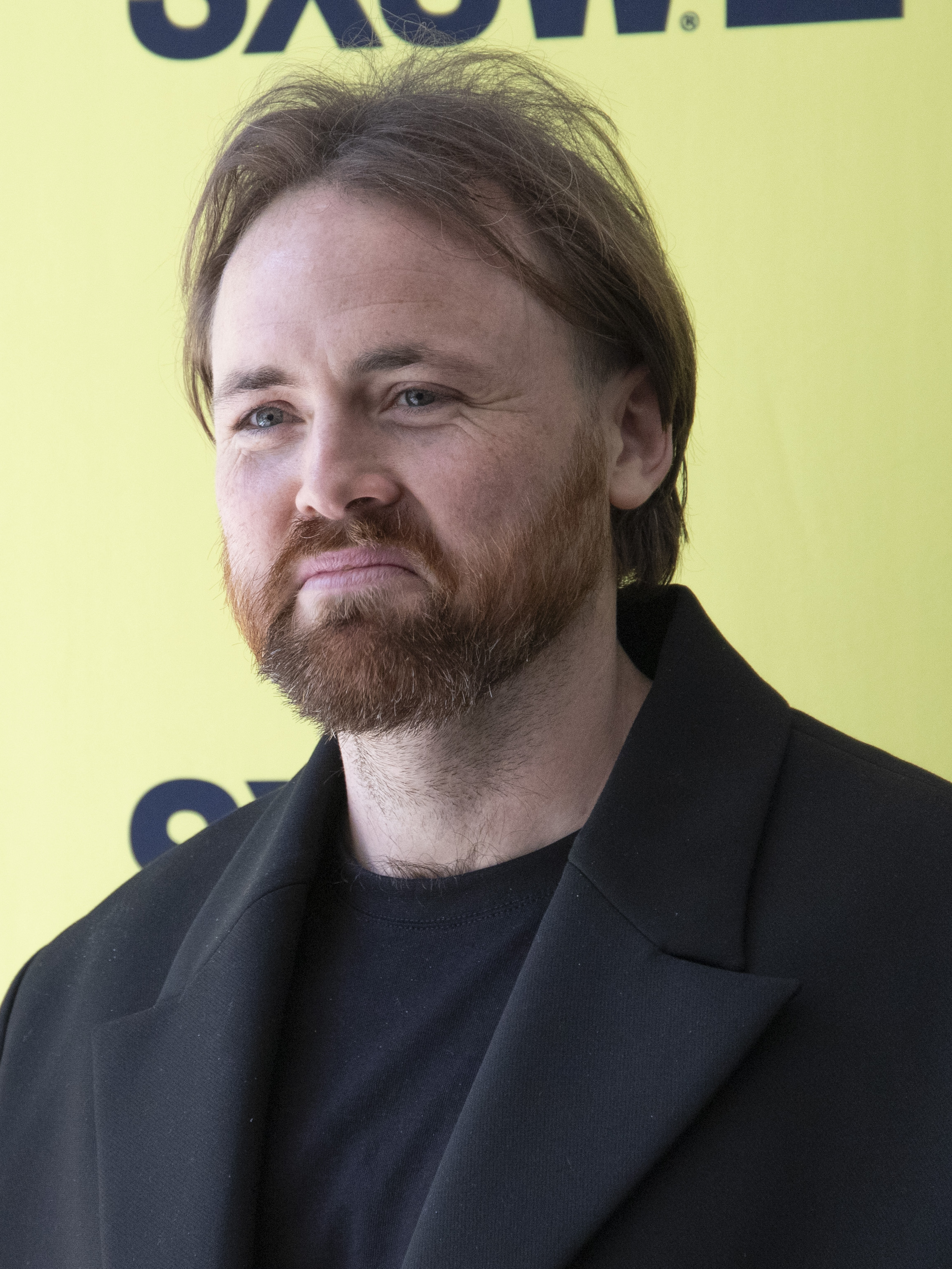
- Hodierne in 2024
- Born: October 27, 1986 (age 39); San Francisco, California
- Occupations: film director, film producer

Cutter Shepard Hodierne (born October 27, 1986) is an American filmmaker best known for winning the Grand Jury Prize at the 2012 Sundance Film Festival for his short film, Fishing Without Nets, and for winning the Directing Award at the 2014 Sundance Film Festival for a feature version of the same film.

== Early life ==
Hodierne was born in 1986 in San Francisco, California, to journalist Alicia Shepard and Robert Hodierne, who was part of the staff of the Charlotte (N.C.) Observer that received the Pulitzer Prize Gold Medal for Meritorious Public Service in 1981 for a series on brown lung disease that afflicted textile workers.

Just before his birth, his parents sold everything they owned, quit their jobs, and bought a 32-foot "cutter-rigged" sailboat, after which he was named.

Hodierne was raised in Arlington, Virginia, where he graduated from H-B Woodlawn in 2005. He briefly attended Emerson College in Boston, but dropped out after two semesters to focus on filmmaking.

== Career ==
While still in high school, Hodierne gained local attention for producing a documentary about Wakefield High School basketball team's unlikely state-championship run. After dropping out of Emerson less than a year later, he began directing short films and music videos full-time in the Washington, D.C., area, including the TV special and music video The Party Roll for Chuck Brown.

In 2009, at age 22, Hodierne was hired as U2's on-the-road documentary filmmaker for the band's U2 360° Tour. After the tour, he travelled to Kenya with co-producers John Hibey and Raphael Swann to direct a fictional short film about Somali piracy in the Indian Ocean called Fishing Without Nets. The film premiered at the 2012 Sundance Film Festival, where it won the Grand Jury Prize in Short Filmmaking.

In 2014, Hodierne returned to Sundance, winning the Directing Award in the U.S. Dramatic Competition for a feature film version of Fishing Without Nets produced and financed by Vice. This was the company's first fictional film. It was released by 20th Century Fox and VICE Films in October 2014.

Hodierne directed the 2024 thriller film Cold Wallet.

Hodierne lives in Los Angeles.
