= Splash, Too =

1988 television film directed by Greg Antonacci

- VHS cover
- Genre: Fantasy-comedy
- Based on: Splash by Bruce Jay Friedman
- Written by: Bruce Franklin Singer
- Directed by: Greg Antonacci
- Starring: Todd Waring; Amy Yasbeck
- Music by: Joel McNeely
- Country of origin: United States
- Original language: English

Production
- Producer: Mark H. Ovitz
- Cinematography: Fred J. Koenekamp
- Running time: 87 minutes
- Production company: Walt Disney Television

Original release
- Network: ABC
- Release: May 1 – May 8, 1988

Related
- Splash

Splash, Too is a 1988 American made-for-television film sequel to the film Splash (1984) produced by Walt Disney Television. Directed by Greg Antonacci and written by Bruce Franklin Singer. It stars Todd Waring as Allen Bauer and Amy Yasbeck as Madison Bauer.

It was first broadcast in two parts on The Disney Sunday Movie on May 1 and May 8, 1988, on the ABC television network.

== Plot ==
Set four years after the events of the first film, Allen Bauer and his wife, Madison a mermaid, have been living on a deserted island hideaway. Allen admits he misses New York City and his older brother, Freddie. Madison has the magical ability to view images in water and communicate; she uses this method to show Allen how things are going on back in New York with Freddie.

The family business, Bauer Produce, is in trouble since Allen left. Madison agrees to return to New York so Allen can help his brother. They are welcomed back by Freddie, and Allen attracts a potential new customer for Bauer Produce, the wealthy Karl Hooten. Karl places importance on family values, so Allen and Madison are to present themselves as a typical happily married couple. Freddie gives them a run-down suburban house to move into, which they restore into presentable condition.

Madison agrees to be a housewife and adjust to life on land. She also has to keep her mermaid side a secret, especially from their new neighbor, Mrs. Needler. When Allen's work takes up more of his time and he breaks some promises to her, his relationship with Madison is strained. Madison finds comfort with her new friend Fern Hooten, Karl's wife, who supports her desires to find her own interests.

During a business event at an aquarium, Madison sees one of her dolphin friends, Salty, in a tank. Madison is upset, especially because Salty has a mate in the wild. Karl is one of the benefactors of the aquarium, so Madison asks him to let Salty go. This causes friction between Madison and Allen, as Allen does not want to get on Karl's bad side. Madison declares her unhappiness with how Allen is disregarding her feelings and leaves, swimming into the ocean.

Allen regrets pushing Madison away. When she returns to the house, he apologizes, and the pair reconcile. They sneak into the aquarium, where Dr. Otto Benus is doing research on Salty, and try to set him free. Fern Hooten comes to their aid and helps them get Salty on to a van and out to the ocean.

At the sea front, Salty is released into the ocean and returns to his mate. Madison and Allen talk about their future and agree to be honest. Allen agrees to return to the sea with Madison if she wants, but he would prefer to stay on land. Madison agrees to stay with him, and the pair embraces. Seeing Salty back with his family makes Allen wonder how mermaids have babies. Madison tells him with a smile, "You'll see. You'll see," as they embrace again with a kiss.

== Cast ==
- Todd Waring as Allen Bauer
- Amy Yasbeck as Madison Bauer
- Donovan Scott as Freddie Bauer
- Rita Taggart as Fern Hooten
- Noble Willingham as Karl Hooten
- Dody Goodman as Mrs. Stimler
- Mark Blankfield as Otto Benus
- Barney Martin as Herb Needler
- Doris Belack as Lois Needler
- Timothy Williams as Harvey
- Jana Marie Hupp as Buffy
- Joey Travolta as Jerry
- Kirk Fyson as Walter
- Roger Hewlett as policeman #1
- Ralph Peduto as policeman #2
- Russell J. McConnell as policeman #3
- Joseph O. Reed Jr. as Wallace
- R.A. Rondell as bartender
- Ginger Stanley as tourist

== Background ==
With a production budget of $3.3 million, Splash, Too was the first film to be shot at the then-new Disney-MGM Studios complex. Dozens of actresses were looked at to play the role of Madison, but none were right for the role until the producers found Amy Yasbeck, who did a screen test for director Greg Antonacci, was cast at the start of 1988. Yasbeck had to wear a blonde wig (over her red hair, which was cut to her shoulders to accommodate wearing the wig) when playing Madison. Yasbeck went through a crash course in scuba diving as well as extensive physical training to prepare to play Madison in the underwater swimming shoots with her mermaid tail costume. Yasbeck was originally going to wear the mermaid tail costume worn and used by Daryl Hannah from the original Splash (1984) film, but she could not fit into it. (Daryl Hannah's Splash mermaid tail was designed and constructed by Academy Award-winning visual effects artist Robert Short. Thom Shouse was the project foreman on Short's mermaid crew.) After undergoing a bodycast, new form-fitted mermaid tails were made for both her and her stunt double Arlene Klein, by Shouse, best known as the Tail Man. The tails made for Splash, Too were easier to put on than the one made for Hannah since they had been made with a zipper. Nevertheless, it took three people to zip up the tail on Yasbeck, and then lift her into the water. Yasbeck received instructions when swimming to only use the tail, and never to use her arms, keeping them at her sides. Yasbeck would spend an hour at a time underwater, frequently taking breaths from the oxygen tanks of nearby divers. The tail was heavy for the actress to wear.

The film was almost entirely recast from the 1984 original, with Dody Goodman (Mrs. Stimler) as the only returning cast member from the first film.

== Home video release ==
Splash, Too was released on home video (VHS tape) in the United Kingdom, France, Germany and Australia by Walt Disney Home Video. Both the UK release and Australian release have been out of print for many years, but sometimes show up on auction sites. There has been no official home entertainment release of any form (VHS, DVD or Blu-ray) in North America (region 1, NTSC format) from Walt Disney Studios Home Entertainment.
