= Cold Wallet =

- Theatrical release poster
- Directed by: Cutter Hodierne
- Screenplay by: John Hibey
- Produced by: John Hibey; Benjamin Wiessner; Cutter Hodierne
- Starring: Raúl Castillo; Melonie Diaz; Tony Cavalero; Josh Brener; Zoe Winters
- Cinematography: Oliver Millar
- Edited by: Kate Hickey
- Music by: Andrew Silagy; Patrick Taylor; Maciej Zieliński
- Production company: Vanishing Angle
- Distributed by: Well Go USA Entertainment
- Release dates: March 8, 2024 (SXSW); February 28, 2025 (United States)
- Running time: 93 minutes
- Country: United States
- Language: English

Cold Wallet is a 2024 American thriller film directed by Cutter Hodierne and written by John Hibey.

== Premise ==
After a cryptocurrency scam causes a team of Redditors to lose everything, they set out to kidnap the "financial influencer" who screwed them over.

== Cast ==
- Raúl Castillo as Billy
- Melonie Diaz as Eva
- Tony Cavalero as Dom
- Josh Brener as Charles Hegel
- Zoë Winters as Eileen

== Release ==
Cold Wallet premiered at the 2024 South by Southwest festival on March 8, 2024. It is scheduled to be released in the United States by Well Go USA Entertainment on February 28, 2025.

== Reception ==
On the review aggregator website Rotten Tomatoes, 66% of 35 critics' reviews are positive, with an average rating of 6.2/10. The website's consensus reads: "Cold Wallet presents a clever and suspenseful premise with moments of intensity, yet its inconsistent tone and stilted dialogue often undermines what could have been a gripping cautionary tale."

== Awards & Nominations ==
Award	Year	Category	Recipient	Result	Ref.
Screamfest	2024	Best Editing	Kate Hickey	Won	
