= The Stiller and Meara Show =

- Genre: Sitcom
- Written by: Anne Meara & Jerry Stiller
- Directed by: Hal Cooper
- Starring: Stiller and Meara
- Country of origin: United States
- Original language: English
- No. of episodes: 1

Production
- Running time: 30 minutes

Original release
- Network: NBC
- Release: June 9, 1986

The Stiller and Meara Show is a 1986 television sitcom pilot featuring the comedy duo Stiller and Meara (Jerry Stiller and Anne Meara) as the deputy mayor of New York (Stiller) and his wife, a TV commercial actress (Meara). It first aired on NBC on June 9, 1986.

== Cast ==
- Jerry Stiller as Jerry Bender
- Anne Meara as Anne Bender
- Todd Waring as Daniel Bender
- Laura Innes as Krissy Bender Marino
- Peter Smith as Max Bender
