= Through an Open Window =

- Directed by: Eric Mendelsohn
- Written by: Eric Mendelsohn
- Produced by: Rocco Caruso
- Starring: F. Murray Abraham
- Cinematography: Jeffrey Seckendorf
- Edited by: Joe Furey
- Release date: 1993
- Running time: 24 minutes
- Country: United States
- Language: English

Through an Open Window is a 1992 American short film directed by Eric Mendelsohn and starring F. Murray Abraham. It was screened in the Un Certain Regard section at the 1992 Cannes Film Festival.

== Cast ==
- F. Murray Abraham
- Frances Foster as Dianne
- Anne Meara
- Cynthia Nixon
