= Anne Meara =

American comedian and actress (1929–2015)

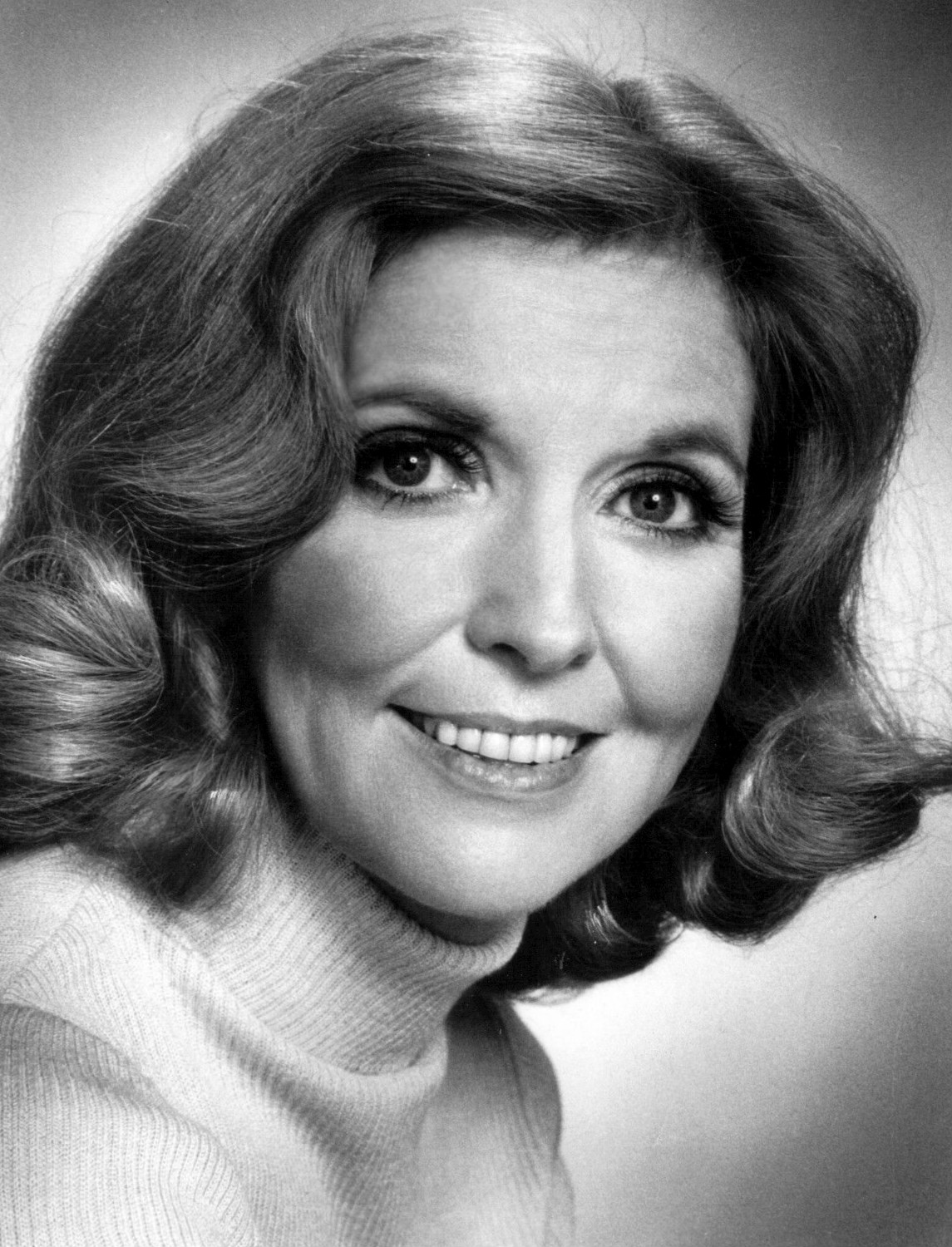
- Meara in 1975
- Born: September 20, 1929; New York City, U.S.
- Died: May 23, 2015 (aged 85); New York City, U.S.
- Occupations: Comedian; actress
- Years active: 1948–2015
- Spouse: Jerry Stiller (m. 1954)
- Children: Amy Stiller and Ben Stiller
- Relatives: Christine Taylor (daughter-in-law)

Anne Meara (September 20, 1929 – May 23, 2015) was an American comedian and actress. With her husband Jerry Stiller, she was half of the 1960s comedy team Stiller and Meara. In 2007, Stiller and Meara were honored with a joint star on the Hollywood Walk of Fame. Their son is actor, director, and producer Ben Stiller. She was also featured on stage, on television, and in numerous films and later became a playwright. During her career, Meara was nominated for four Emmy Awards and a Tony Award, and she won a Writers Guild Award as a co-writer for the television movie The Other Woman.

== Early years ==
Meara was born on September 20, 1929, in Brooklyn, New York City, to Mary (née Dempsey) and Edward Joseph Meara, a corporate lawyer for American Standard. Both of her parents were of Irish descent. An only child, she was raised in Rockville Centre, New York, on Long Island. When Anne was 11 years old, her mother died by suicide when she turned on her oven and inhaled the gas.

When she was 18, Meara spent a year studying acting at the Dramatic Workshop at The New School and at HB Studio under Uta Hagen in Manhattan. The following year, in 1948, she began her career as an actress in summer stock.

== Career ==
=== Comedy team ===
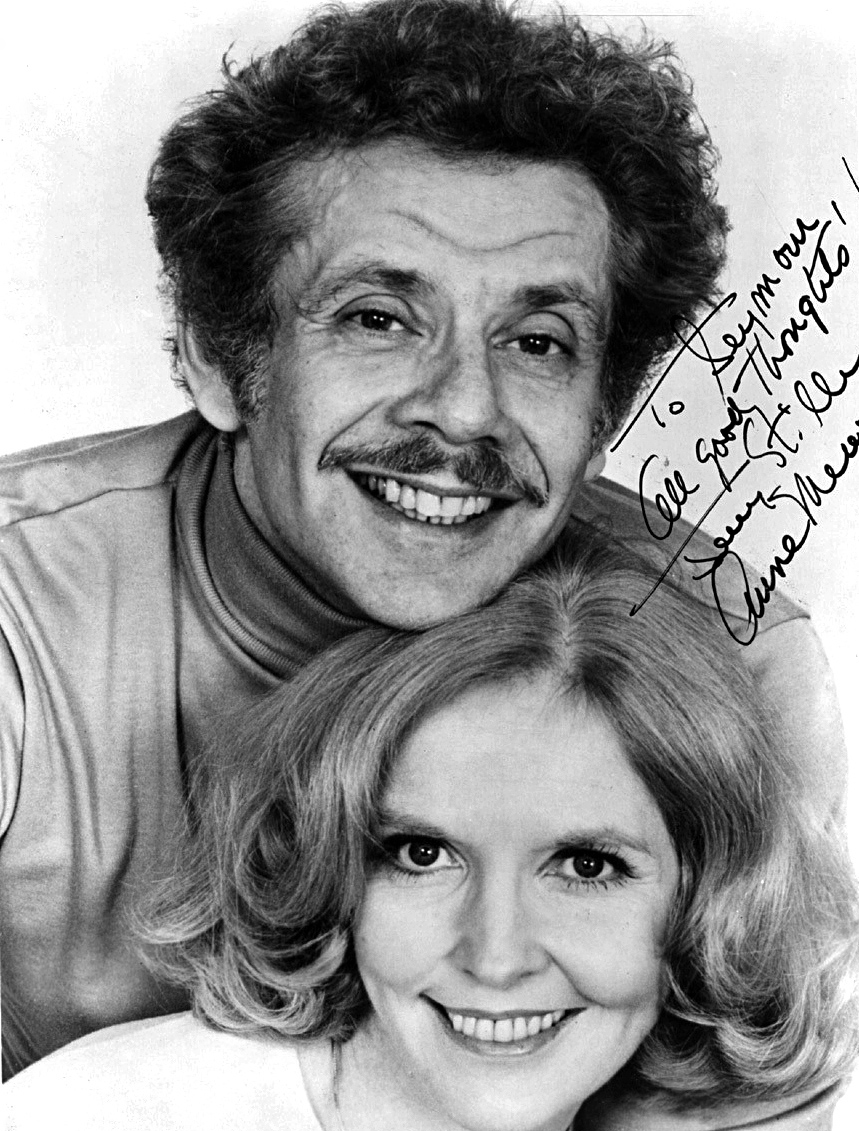
Publicity photo of Meara and Jerry Stiller, 1965

Meara met actor-comedian Jerry Stiller in 1953, and they married soon after. Until he suggested it, she had never thought of doing comedy. "Jerry started us being a comedy team," she said. "He always thought I would be a great comedy partner." They joined the Chicago improvisational company The Compass Players (which later became The Second City) and, after leaving, formed the comedy team of Stiller and Meara. She debuted off-Broadway in 1958 in Ulysses in Nighttown, based on the work by James Joyce. In 1961, she and Stiller were performing in nightclubs in New York and by the following year were considered a "national phenomenon", said the New York Times.

Their often improvised comedy routines brought many relationship foibles to live audiences. Their skits focused on domestic themes, as did Nichols and May, another comedy team from the Chicago Compass Players project during that period. "They were Nichols and May without the acid and with warmth," notes author Lawrence Epstein. They also added a new twist to their comedy act, he adds, by sometimes playing up the fact that Stiller was Jewish and Meara was Catholic. After Nichols and May broke up as a team in 1961, Stiller and Meara were the number-one couple comedy team by the late 1960s. And as Mike Nichols and Elaine May were not married, Stiller and Meara became the most famous married couple comedy team since Burns and Allen.

After some years honing the act, Stiller and Meara became regulars on The Ed Sullivan Show, with 36 appearances, and other TV programs, including The Tonight Show Starring Johnny Carson. They released their first LP in 1963, Presenting America's New Comedy Sensation: Jerry Stiller and Anne Meara Live at The Hungry I, which became a hit. By 1970, however, they broke up their act because it was affecting their marriage: "I didn't know where the act ended and our marriage began," complained Meara in 1977. Stiller agreed, fearing, "I would have lost her as a wife."

=== Television, stage, film, and video ===
During the 1970s, Meara and Stiller wrote and performed many radio commercials for Blue Nun Wine. In 1975, she starred in her own series, Kate McShane, on CBS. She was nominated for an Emmy Award for Outstanding Lead Actress in a Drama Series in 1976; however, the show was canceled after ten episodes. She had a recurring role on the sitcom Rhoda as airline stewardess Sally Gallagher, one of the title character's best friends. She had roles as Mrs. Curry in The Boys from Brazil (1978) and as Mrs. Sherwood in Fame (1980).

In the 1970s, she provided narration for segments of the educational television series Sesame Street consisting of scenes from silent films.

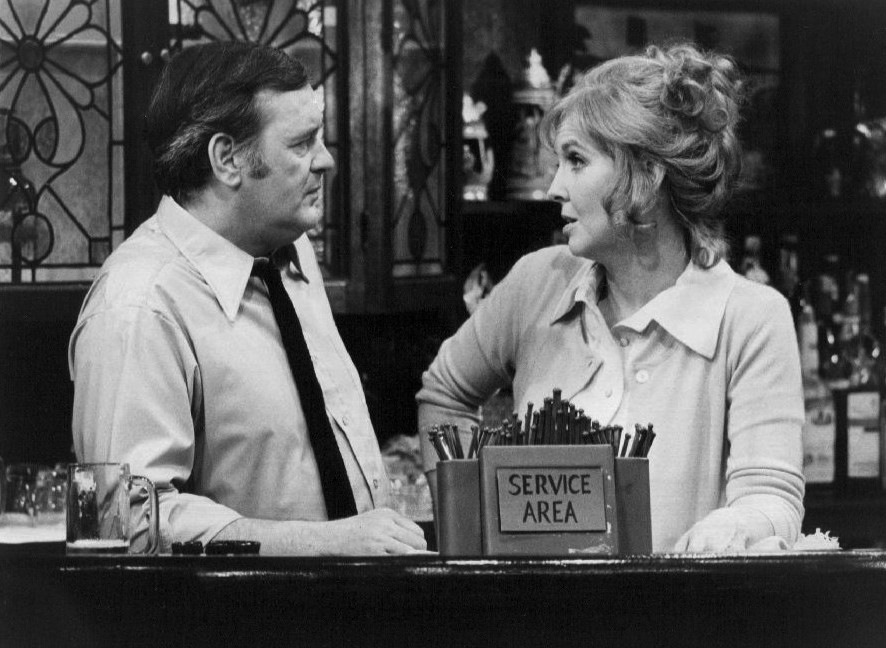
Eugene Roche and Meara in an episode of The Corner Bar, 1973

Meara co-starred with Carroll O'Connor (with whom she had appeared onstage off-Broadway many years earlier in Ulysses in Nighttown) and Martin Balsam in the early 1980s hit sitcom Archie Bunker's Place, which was a continuation of the influential 1970s sitcom All in the Family. She played Veronica Rooney, the bar's cook, for the show's first three seasons (1979–1982). During that time, she acted in the movie Fame (1980), in which she played English teacher Elizabeth Sherwood. She appeared as Dorothy Halligan Deaver, the grandmother, in the TV series ALF in the late 1980s. The Stiller and Meara Show, the 1986 TV sitcom, in which Stiller played the deputy mayor of New York City and Meara portrayed his wife, a television commercial actress, was unsuccessful.

From 1999 to 2007, Meara guest starred in The King of Queens (where her husband played Arthur Spooner), first as Mary Finnegan, then as Veronica Olchin (mother of Spence, who was played by Patton Oswalt). Veronica and Arthur were married in the series finale. In her later years, she had a recurring role in Sex and the City (as Mary Brady), and appeared in two episodes of Law & Order: Special Victims Unit.

Starting in October 2010, Meara and Jerry Stiller began starring in a Yahoo! web series called Stiller & Meara produced by Red Hour Digital, a production company owned by their son Ben Stiller.

In 2011, she accepted a role in the off-Broadway play Love, Loss, and What I Wore with Conchata Ferrell, AnnaLynne McCord, Minka Kelly, and B. Smith.

=== Writing and consulting ===
In 1995, Meara wrote the comedy After-Play, which became an off-Broadway production. In 2009, Meara wrote her personal life reflections in a New York-focused online blog titled Mr. Beller's Neighborhood -- New York City Stories. In it, Meara recalled her mother's death and her childhood experiences at Catholic boarding school.

== Personal life ==
=== Religion ===
Meara was born, baptized, and raised a Roman Catholic. She converted to Judaism six years after marrying Stiller. She insisted that she did not convert at Stiller's request, explaining, "Catholicism was dead to me." She took her conversion seriously and studied the Jewish faith in such depth that her Jewish-born husband quipped, "Being married to Anne has made me more Jewish." They discussed how they met and their early career during a guest appearance on the TV game show What's My Line? in 1968.

=== Children ===
Meara and her husband had two children, Amy and Ben.

=== Death ===
Meara died on May 23, 2015, aged 85, in Manhattan, from natural causes. She had been living in the Hebrew Home for the Aged following several strokes.

== Acting credits ==
=== Film ===
Year	Title	Role	Notes
1970	The Out-of-Towners	Woman in Police Station	
1970	Lovers and Other Strangers	Wilma	
1972	Irish Whiskey Rebellion	Goldie Fain-Follies Star	
1977	Nasty Habits	Sister Geraldine	
1978	The Boys from Brazil	Mrs. Curry	
1980	Fame	Mrs. Sherwood	
1984	In Our Hands		Documentary
1986	The Longshot	Madge	
1986	The Perils of P.K.		
1987	My Little Girl	Mrs. Shopper	
1989	That's Adequate	Charlene Lane	
1990	Awakenings	Miriam	
1992	Highway to Hell	Medea	
1992	Through an Open Window		24-minute short
1993	So You Want to Be an Actor	Herself	Short subject
1994	Reality Bites	Louise	
1994	The Search for One-Eye Jimmy	Holly Hoyt	
1995	Heavyweights	Alice Bushkin	
1995	Kiss of Death	Bev's Mother	
1996	The Daytrippers	Rita Malone	
1998	The Thin Pink Line	Mrs. Langstrom	
1998	Southie	Mrs. Quinn	
1999	The Diary of the Hurdy-Gurdy Man		
1999	Judy Berlin	Bea	
1999	Brooklyn Thrill Killers		29-minute short
1999	A Fish in the Bathtub	Molly	
2000	Amy Stiller's Breast	Herself	Short subject
2000	The Independent	Rita	
2001	Zoolander	Protestor	Uncredited
2001	Keeping It Real: The Adventures of Greg Walloch		Documentary
2001	Get Well Soon	Linda	
2002	Like Mike	Sister Theresa	
2002	The Yard Sale		19-minute short
2003	Crooked Lines	Hard Boiled	
2004	Chump Change	Casting Director	
2006	Night at the Museum	Debbie	
2007	The Mirror		
2007	The Shallow End of the Ocean	Voice of Alice	28-minute short
2009	When the Evening Comes	Marion Corrado	
2009	The Queen of Greenwich Village		13-minute short
2009	Another Harvest Moon	Ella	
2014	Simpler Times		33-minute short with Jerry Stiller
2014	Planes: Fire & Rescue	Winnie	Voice

=== Television ===
Year	Title	Role	Notes	Ref.
1954–55	The Greatest Gift	Harriet	219 episodes	
1954	The Philco Television Playhouse	Betty Blake	Episode: "Man on the Mountaintop"	
1959	The DuPont Show of the Month	Performer	Episode: "Oliver Twist"	
1960	Ninotchka	Anna	ABC TV movie	
1964–65	Linus! The Lion Hearted	Voice	Animated TV series, 3 episodes	
1971	Dames at Sea	Joan	Television Special	
1971–72	The Courtship of Eddie's Father	Bunny Sterling; Annie Dempsey	2 episodes	
1971–73	Love, American Style	Various roles	2 episodes	
1973	The Paul Lynde Show	Grace Dickerson	3 episodes	
1973	The Corner Bar	Mae/Jennifer Bradley	Cast member, 7 episodes	
1974	Medical Center	Rose Miller	Episode: "The Enemies"	
1975	Kate McShane	Kate McShane	Canceled after 10 episodes	
1976–77	Rhoda	Sally Gallagher	7 episodes	
1977–78	Take Five with Stiller & Meara			
1979–83	Love Boat	Various roles	3 episodes	
1979–83	Archie Bunker's Place	Veronica Rooney	52 episodes	
1979–83	HBO Sneak Previews		Costarred with Jerry Stiller	
1983	The Other Woman	Peg Gilford	TV movie (CBS); Meara co-wrote the teleplay with Lila Garrett	
1986	The Stiller and Meara Show	Anne Bender	Co-writer; Canceled after a few weeks	
1987	Saturday Night Live	Bartender	Episode: "Charlton Heston/Wynton Marsalis"	
1987–89	ALF	Dorothy Halligan	7 episodes	
1987–89	CBS Schoolbreak Special	Mrs. Salters	Episode: "The Day They Came to Arrest the Book"	
1988–93	Murder, She Wrote	Winnie Tupper Banner; Mae Shaughnessy	2 episodes	
1990	Monsters	Greta	Episode: "One Wolf's Family"	
1991	The General Motors Playwrights Theater	Rose Finker	Episode: "Avenue Z Afternoon"	
1991	Shalom Sesame	Miriam	Episode: "Show 10: Passover"	
1991	American Playhouse	Bernice Shapiro	"The Sunset Gang": segment: "The Detective"	
1992–99	All My Children	Peggy Moody	5 episodes	
1992–99	CBS Schoolbreak Special	Patricia Lennon	Episode: "Love off Limits"	
1994	In the Heat of the Night	Roda	Episode: "Poor Relations"	
1994	Great Performances: The Mother	Mrs. Geegan	PBS TV movie, October 24, 1994	
1994	Murphy Brown	Reena Bernecky	2 episodes	
1996	Homicide: Life on the Street	Donna DiGrazi	2 episodes	
1997	Jitters	mother	TV movie	
1999	After Play		Writer and cast member	
1999–02	Oz	Aunt Brenda O'Reily	2 episodes	
1999; 2003–07	The King of Queens	Mary Finnegan (1999); Veronica Olchin (2003–07)	10 episodes	
2001	What Makes a Family	Evelyn Cataldi	TV movie (Lifetime)	
2001	Ed	Barbara Gennacarro	Episode: "The Test"	
2001	Will & Grace	Mrs. Friedman	Episode: "Star-Spangled Banter"	
2002–04	Sex and the City	Mary Brady	4 episodes	
2003	Good Morning, Miami	Claire's Friend	Episode: "The Slow and the Furious"	
2003	Charlie Lawrence	Pauline Lawrence	Episode: "If It's Not One Thing It's Your Mother"	
2004–12	Law & Order: Special Victims Unit	Ida Becker; Irene Kerns	Episode: "Scavenger"; Episode: "Dreams Deferred"	
2006	Four Kings	Ruth	Episode: "Pilot"	
2009	Mercy	Estelle Thalberg	Episode: "The Last Thing I Said Was"	
2009–10	Wonder Pets!	Granny Ginny/Granny Winny	2 episodes: Voice	
2010	Gravity	Mrs. Talbot	Episode: "Old People Creep Me Out"	
2011	Rip City	Myrt	TVLand sitcom pilot that did not sell	

=== Theatre ===
Year	Title	Credit(s)	Notes	Ref.
1956	A Month in the Country	Katina the maid	Phoenix Theatre, Off-Broadway	
1956	The Good Woman of Setzuan	Niece	Phoenix Theatre, Off-Broadway	
1957	Miss Loneyhearts	Sick-of-it-All	Music Box Theatre, Broadway	
1958	As You Like It	Audrey	Joseph Papp Public Theater, Off-Broadway	
1958	Ulysseys in Nighttown	Various roles	Rooftop Theatre, Off-Broadway	
1971	The House of Blue Leaves	Bunny Flingus	Truck and Warehouse Theatre, Off-Broadway	
1984	Spookhouse	Performer	Playhouse 91, Off-Broadway	
1984	A... My Name Is Alice	Writer	Top of the Gate, Off-Broadway	
1988	Romeo and Juliet	Nurse	Joseph Papp Public Theater, Off-Broadway	
1988	Eastern Standard	May Logan	John Golden Theatre, Broadway	
1993	Anna Christie	Marthy Owen	Center Stage Right, Broadway	
1995	After-Play	Terry Guteman; Playwright	Theatre Four, Broadway	
2000	Down the Garden Paths	Playwright	Minetta Lane Theatre, Off-Broadway	
2011	Love, Loss and What I Wore	Performer	Westside Theatre, Off-Broadway	

=== Radio ===
- I'd Rather Eat Pants, National Public Radio, 2002

== Awards and nominations ==
Year	Award	Category	Nominated work	Result	Ref.
1976	Golden Globe Awards	Best Supporting Actress - Television	Rhoda	Nominated	
1976	Primetime Emmy Awards	Outstanding Actress in a Drama Series	Kate McShane	Nominated	
1981	Primetime Emmy Awards	Outstanding Supporting Actress in a Comedy Series	Archie Bunker's Place	Nominated	
1982	Primetime Emmy Awards	Outstanding Supporting Actress in a Comedy Series	Archie Bunker's Place	Nominated	
1997	Primetime Emmy Awards	Guest Actress in a Drama Series	Homicide: Life on the Street	Nominated	
1984	Writers Guild of America Awards	Original/Adapted Comedy Anthology	The Other Woman	Won	
1993	Tony Awards	Best Featured Actress in a Play	Anna Christie	Nominated	
1996	Outer Critics Circle Award	John Gassner Award	After-Play	Won	

- On February 9, 2007, Meara and Jerry Stiller received stars on the Hollywood Walk of Fame at 7018 Hollywood Blvd.
