= The Lucie Arnaz Show =

American TV series or program (1985)

- Based on: Agony by Len Richmond & Anna Raeburn
- Developed by: Sam Denoff
- Starring: Lucie Arnaz; Tony Roberts; Lee Bryant; Karen Jablons-Alexander; Todd Waring
- Composer: Jack Elliott
- Country of origin: United States
- Original language: English
- No. of seasons: 1
- No. of episodes: 6

Production
- Executive producer: Sam Denoff
- Producers: Susan Seeger; Kathy Speer; Terry Grossman
- Running time: 30 minutes
- Production companies: Sam Denoff Productions; Taft Entertainment Television

Original release
- Network: CBS
- Release: April 2 – June 11, 1985

The Lucie Arnaz Show is an American sitcom that aired on CBS from April 2 until June 11, 1985. It was based on the British sitcom Agony.

== Premise ==
Dr. Jane Lucas is a psychologist who answers questions from the public on her radio show ("The Jane Lucas Show") and in a magazine. Jim Gordon is her boss.

== Reception ==
Although it was billed as a comedy, Arnaz told an interviewer, "It's not a comedy, it's not a drama. It's a story." Critics agreed that the show was not a successful comedy. "The Lucie Arnaz Show lacks both appeal and humor," wrote The Cincinnati Enquirer's Tom Brinkmoeller, who also called it "uninspired". In 1990, Arnaz recalled the show's brief run as "a depressing experience."

== Cast ==
- Lucie Arnaz as Dr. Jane Lucas
- Tony Roberts as Jim Gordon
- Karen Jablons-Alexander as Loretta
- Lee Bryant as Jill
- Todd Waring as Larry Love

== Episodes ==
No.	Title	Directed by	Written by	Original release date
1	"The Old Boyfriend"	Ed Feldman	Susan Seeger	April 2, 1985
2	"Sisters"	Ed Feldman	Susan Seeger, Kathy Speer & Terry Grossman	April 9, 1985
3	"Good Sports"	Allen Baron	Kathy Speer & Terry Grossman	April 23, 1985
4	"Larry Writes the Songs"	Allen Baron	R.J. Colleary	April 30, 1985
5	"Jane's Desperate Hour"	Peter Baldwin	Len Richmond & Sam Denoff	June 4, 1985
6	"Birthday Blues"	Peter Baldwin	Laura Levine	June 11, 1985
