= Time Expired (1992 film) =

- Directed by: Danny Leiner
- Written by: Danny Leiner
- Starring: Bob Gosse; John Leguizamo; Edie Falco
- Release date: 1992
- Running time: 29 minutes
- Country: United States
- Language: English

Time Expired is a 1992 short film directed by Danny Leiner and starring Bob Gosse, Edie Falco and John Leguizamo.
