= Fishing Without Nets (2014 film) =

2014 American drama film

- Film poster
- Directed by: Cutter Hodierne
- Screenplay by: Cutter Hodierne; John Hibey; Sam Cohan
- Story by: David Burkman; Cutter Hodierne; John Hibey
- Produced by: Ben Freedman; Brian Glazen; Stephanie Pinola: Victor Shapiro; Raphael Swann
- Starring: Eric Godon; Abdiwali Farrah; Abdikhadir Hassan; Idil Ibrahim; Abdi Kani; Reda Kateb
- Cinematography: Alex Disenhof
- Edited by: Dominic LaPerriere
- Production companies: Think Media Studios; Vice Films
- Release date: January 17, 2014 (Sundance)
- Running time: 110 minutes
- Country: United States
- Language: English

Fishing Without Nets is a 2014 American drama film written and directed by Cutter Hodierne. The film stars Abdikani Muktar, Abdi Siad, Abdiwali Farrah, Abdikhadir Hassan, Reda Kateb and Idil Ibrahim.

The film premiered in-competition in the US Dramatic Category at 2014 Sundance Film Festival on January 17, 2014. It won an award at the festival.

== Synopsis ==
A Somali father turns to piracy in order to support his family. However, he begins to experience intense ethical reservations.

== Cast ==
- Abdikani Muktar Manur as Abdi
- Abdikhadir Mukhtar as Khadir
- Abdiwali Farrah as China Boy (Abdi's pirate friend)
- Reda Kateb as Victor
- Idil Ibrahim as Idil
- Eric Godon as Captain Charlie
- Abdi Siad as Blacky
- Hanad Mire as Hanad
- Abubakr Mahamud Mire as Mr. Chairman
- Abdikani Muktar as a side character (no name)

== Plot ==
Fishing Without Nets is a story of Somali pirates told from the perspective of a young fisherman named Abdi. The film begins with showcasing Abdi's life as a poor fisherman and his dire family situation. The sea later is revealed to be polluted which makes Abdi's life even more difficult to maintain. The film then transitions into Abdi and his crew hijacking a cargo ship and taking its crew members as hostages. However, Abdi starts to question his actions and develops a bond with one of the hostages, a white man named Victor.

As the story progresses, tensions among the pirates begin to rise. Some of the pirates become frustrated with the lack of payment and the presence of planes flying over their camp. This leads to a confrontation with Khadir and his men on the cargo ship. One of the pirates even threatens to shoot Victor if he doesn't call for money.

Abdi plans to leave the camp to save his family, but he is accused of stealing money and communicating with the drones. The situation becomes more intense when the pirates get high on khat and gasoline and force Victor to recite the shahada. Luckily, Kadir and his men intervene and prevent any harm from coming to Victor.

However, the tension among the pirates continues to escalate, leading to a violent attack and the pirates taking control of the cargo ship. Kadir loses his life, and Abdi is locked in a room at the bottom of the ship after trying to escape. The pirates assume that they are not getting paid and plan to kill the hostages. Victor and Abdi attempt to escape, but Victor is killed by the same pirate who killed Kadir.

Abdi manages to escape and honor Victor with a proper burial. He then sets out to find the money, and after navigating the cargo ship to the area, he finds it. The movie ends with Abdi successfully finding the money and the story coming full circle.

== Release ==
Fishing without Nets premiered at the 2014 Sundance Film Festival. It was also screened at the Venice Film Festival and the South by Southwest Film Festival. It reportedly grossed around $11,000 in its domestic box office and was later released in theaters and on video-on-demand platforms. Hodierne originally made a short film of the same name in 2012, which won the Jury Prize in Short Filmmaking at the 2012 Sundance Film Festival.

== Critical response ==
Fishing Without Nets met with positive response from critics upon its premiere at the 2014 Sundance Film Festival. Dennis Harvey, in his review for Variety, praised the film that "Cutter Hodierne makes an accomplished feature debut with this very well-crafted, empathetic hijacking drama." John DeFore of The Hollywood Reporter in his review said that "While the setup and the moral dilemmas are all familiar from crime stories told in other settings, Hodierne does a fine job balancing the elements. The movie never reaches the sweating-bullets heights of its Hollywood cousin, but it's distinct enough from that film to keep us watching." Ryland Aldrich from TwitchFilm praised the direction and editing that "From the gorgeous visuals to the incredible acting by non-professionals, Fishing Without Nets takes a world to which we've been recently introduced, and expands it to magnificent results."

== Accolades ==
Year	Award	Category	Recipient	Result
2014	Sundance Film Festival	U.S. Grand Jury Prize: Dramatic	Cutter Hodierne	Nominated
2014	Sundance Film Festival	Directing Award: U.S. Dramatic	Cutter Hodierne	Won
2014	Traverse City Film Festival	Roger Ebert Prize - Best First Feature	Cutter Hodierne	Won
2014	Washington West Film Festival	Best Narrative Feature	Cutter Hodierne	Won
2014	BFI London Film Festival	Best Film Award	Cutter Hodierne	Nominated
2014	Stockholm International Film Festival	Stockholm XXV Competition	Cutter Hodierne	Nominated
2014	Camerimage	Best Cinematography	Alex Disenhof	Nominated
2014	Guanajuato International Film Festival	Best International Fiction Feature Film	Cutter Hodierne	Nominated
2014	Auteur Film Festival (Belgrade)	Best Narrative Feature	Cutter Hodierne	Nominated
