= Diane Whittlesey =

- Oz character
- Created by: Tom Fontana
- Portrayed by: Edie Falco

In-universe information
- Gender: Female
- Title: Unit manager
- Occupation: Correctional officer
- Spouse: Unnamed ex-husband
- Significant other: Tim McManus
- Children: DeeDee

Officer Diane Whittlesey is a fictional character played by Edie Falco on the television program Oz. According to an article in The New York Times, Whittlesey was modeled after a female unit manager whom series creator Tom Fontana met at a prison in southern New Jersey.

== Character overview ==
Oz's first female correctional officer is a divorcee and single mother, who has suffered spousal abuse, poverty and substance abuse; through all of that, she gained a pretty good understanding of criminal life. She is a CO in the Oswald Maximum Security Penitentiary, but repeatedly explains that this is because she can't find work anywhere else. Her only drive is taking care of her mother, who has cancer, and her young daughter, whom she has to raise all by herself. She works double shifts, sometimes sleeping in the prison, just to make ends meet, and is shown to be one of the more compassionate and fair COs. Whittlesey is one of the few characters to have a happy ending to their series arc.

== Season 1 (1997) ==
Whittlesey is introduced as the supervisor of the guards in Emerald City, Unit Manager Tim McManus' experimental cell block, first seen when a new group of inmates, including Tobias Beecher and Miguel Alvarez, arrive at Oz. She helps to keep prisoners' records and to stop any conflicts between inmates. Eventually, she and McManus form an attraction and even have sex inside an empty cell while avoiding the execution of Jefferson Keane. However, when the two receive flak from their fellow staff members over their relationship, particularly by Mike Healy, she breaks it off with McManus, who despite his reputation for bed-hopping and womanizing, reacts poorly.

Eventually, Whittlesey gets some bad news — Oz has made a contract with the Department of Corrections that, as a condition, will no longer allow officers to work overtime, severely impacting her finances. More trouble arises for her when Scott Ross enters Oz. He was a biker on the outside and used to be in the same gang as Whittlesey's ex-husband. He is obsessed with Whittlesey, and on the outside he repeatedly tried to have sex with her behind her husband's back. Ross decides to "help her out" with her situation at home; he proposes that she smuggle cigarettes for him and he will give her a cut of the profits. She agrees reluctantly, but is quickly discovered by McManus. He doesn't fire her, knowing she's only trying to make money for her family, but demands she put an end to it. Ross however, threatens to tell Warden Leo Glynn and take from Whittlesey everything she has worked for unless she continues.

When a riot breaks out in Em City, Whittlesey is protected from serious harm or rape by Kareem Said and the Muslims, but ultimately taken hostage along with several other COs. When Miguel Alvarez attempts to patch-up two severely-injured guards, Whittlesey reveals she used to be a volunteer nurse and offers assistance, which is ignored. When the SORT team prepares to storm Em City, Whittlesey is lined up with McManus (who traded himself as a hostage for the two critically injured officers) and the other COs with the expectation they will be the first to get shot and killed. In the ensuing chaos Ross shoots McManus with Said's discarded handgun. Whittlesey later procures a gun and kills Ross; shooting him in the head, heart, and genitalia.

== Season 2 (1998) ==
As Alvah Case investigates the riot, he notices that Ross was shot execution-style. Meanwhile, while patrolling Unit B, Vern Schillinger, leader of the Aryan Brotherhood, tells Whittlesey that he saw her kill Ross and that he will make sure she is exposed. When Case confronts Whittlesey, she admits to killing Ross. Glynn convinces Case that Whittlesey is the best guard he's ever had, that she is struggling to make enough money, and that punishing her for taking Ross' life is not worth ruining hers. Feeling sorry for Whittlesey, Case rules that Ross was killed by bullets from the SORT team members.

Schillinger proposes to Whittlesey that if she helps him kill Tobias Beecher, he will pay her handsomely and keep her secret. She turns the tables against him, however, and sets him up to be charged with conspiracy to commit murder. To get back at her, Schillinger tells McManus the truth about Ross' death. Whittlesey denies it to McManus. Eventually, Whittlesey decides to move back to Emerald City, where she shows an unrequited interest in McManus. He now suspects her of killing Ross, and reopens the investigation. She admits to him that she did do it, but only because Ross shot him first.

Schillinger approached Muslim leader Kareem Said, who was handling cases for various prisoners, and asked him to represent him on the conspiracy to commit murder charge. In investigating the case, Said interrogated McManus and Whittlesey about the murder, and both of them lied. Eventually, the lack of proof buried the truth once more. However, McManus was ridden with guilt for lying, and decided to transfer Whittlesey out of Emerald City and into Unit B.

== Season 3 (1999) ==
Whittlesey continues to work in Unit B, and finds another female correctional officer working with her, Officer Claire Howell. Tension soon develops between them, once Howell takes an interest in McManus.

Soon afterward, Whittlesey learns that her mother has died. McManus comforts her, which stirs up tension in his relationship with Howell. Eventually, Howell sues him for sexual harassment, after she is threatened with termination, worsening the tension between the two women. Whittlesey takes McManus' side and the two grow close again throughout the ordeal. Which is furthered after Kenny Wangler also makes an allegation of sexual harassment to Warden Glynn, on the orders of Simon Adebisi who then sells the story to the media, which Claire Howell also attests too, hurting McManus's credibility. After enduring one of Howells taunt's, Whittlesey attacks Howell in the staff room, McManus and another CO breakup the fight. In the Infirmary, Gloria treats Claire and Diane, Leo Glynn and McManus argue in front of staff and inmates, after Leo tells him to take responsibility for "fires you create" McManus accuses Glynn of siding with black inmates and failing to back him. In the end, McManus asks Whittlesey to renew their relationship.

When the entire prison is put into lockdown amid serious racial tension, Whittlesey fears another riot, after Augustus Hill is set up and put in Ad Seg angering the black inmates who being chanting "set Hill free" and decides to take vacation leave. She goes to England with her daughter.

== Season 4 (2000) ==
Whittlesey's vacation was supposed to be finished, but she never came back to Oz, much to McManus' disappointment and agitation, since he intended to propose to her upon her return. She phones Sister Pete, and explains that she is engaged to a Royal Guardsman. McManus is crushed, reads a letter from her and barely acknowledges her during a strained long-distance phone call. This leads to McManus having a nervous breakdown, and eventually, losing his job following an incident where black inmates and a CO are killed. By an inmate, who was given a firearm by Adebisi, McManus breaks down publicly at a memorial for the CO by singing a racist song. Despite urging from Gloria Nathan and Sister Peter Marie to get McManus some help. Warden Glynn tiring of McManus's liability fires him and has Martin Querns replace him as Unit Manager of Emarald City.

Whittlesey's departure was written into the show as Edie Falco had been offered the role of Carmela Soprano on The Sopranos.
