= Side Man =

Play by Warren Leight

- Original language: English
- Written by: Warren Leight
- Characters: Jonesy; Terry; Ziggy; Clifford; Al; Patsy; Gene
- Subject
- Genre: Drama
- Setting: New York City, 1953-1985

Premiere
- Date: March 11, 1998
- Place: East 13th Street Theater; New York City

Side Man is a memory play by Warren Leight. His inspiration was his father Donald, who worked as a sideman, in jazz parlance a musician for hire who can blend in with the band or star as a solo performer, according to what is required by the gig.

== Plot ==
The play starts in the 1950s and follows the family through the next 35 years. The play's narrator is Clifford Glimmer, the only son of Gene, a talented but self-absorbed jazz trumpeter, and his alcoholic wife Terry, who describes the tumultuous relationship his parents shared and the haphazard career journey Gene followed over the course of three decades. Dedicated more to his music than his family, he refuses to accept a regular job to support them, and their home life gradually unravels. Clifford eventually assumes the role of breadwinner his father has forsaken and offers his mother the emotional support Gene cannot. Scenes alternate between the family's Spartan New York City apartment and the smoke-filled nightclubs and cabarets of another era.

== Productions ==
Side Man was first presented in a workshop by the Naked Angels in March 1996. It was then produced at Vassar College in a joint production of the New York Stage and Film Company and The Powerhouse Theatre, in association with RKJ Productions in July 1996.

The play premiered at the off-off-Broadway East 13th Street Theater from March 11, 1998, to March 29. Directed by Michael Mayer, the cast included Frank Wood as Gene, Robert Sella as Clifford, and Edie Falco as Terry, Joseph Lyle Taylor as Al, Michael Mastro as Ziggy, Kevin Geer as Jonsey, and Angelica Torn as Patsy.

The Broadway production, also directed by Mayer, opened on June 25, 1998, at the Criterion Center Stage Right. It transferred to the John Golden Theatre on October 20, 1998, for a total run of 517 performances and 27 previews. Wood and Sella reprised their roles, with Wendy Makkena replacing Falco as Terry. Later in the run Sella was replaced successively by Andrew McCarthy, Christian Slater, and Scott Wolf, Wood was replaced by Michael O'Keefe, and Makkena was replaced by Falco. Falco was replaced by Page who assumed the role of Terry for the remainder of the Broadway and Kennedy Center run. Page received the Helen Hayes Award in Washington D.C. in the Outstanding Lead Actress category.

Through an arrangement with Actors' Equity, which allowed for the British cast of The Real Thing to travel to Broadway, Side Man, with Wood, Falco (reassuming the lead role of Terry), Page (reassuming the supporting role of Patsy), and Jason Priestley, opened on February 8, 2000, in London's West End at the Apollo Theatre, where it ran to June 2000.

== Critical response ==
In reviewing the off-Broadway production, Peter Marks of the New York Times called it "both heartbreaking and touching, a play of true feeling, full of affection for its characters and insight about the events it conjures."

The CurtainUp reviewer wrote: "When a show is this good, I'm prompted to ask what distinguishes it. For one thing, there is the dexterous hand of Michael Mayer (who has been involved in this show since its early workshops) guiding; he keeps the storytelling in sharp focus. For another, there are the wholly convincing performances, rendered with attentive and obvious joy, and no weak links. But in the final analysis, it is the integrity of Warren Leight's semi-autobiographical story that sets this play apart. There is a melding of objectivity with the personal: the love is as palpable as the inconsistencies it generates."

== Awards and nominations ==
- 2000 Helen Hayes Award, Outstanding Lead Actress (Angelica Torn, winner)
- 1999 Pulitzer Prize for Drama (finalist)
- 1999 Tony Award for Best Play (winner)
- 1999 Tony Award, Featured Actor in a Play (Frank Wood, winner)
- 1999 Drama League, Distinguished Production of a Play (nominee)
- 1999 Friends of New York Theater Award, Best Play (winner)
- 1999 Friends of New York Theater Award, Outstanding Supporting Actress in a Play (Angelica Torn, winner)
- 1998 Drama Desk Award for Outstanding New Play (nominee)
- 1998 Drama Desk Award, Outstanding Actress in a Play (Edie Falco, nominee)
- 1998 Outer Critics Circle Award for Outstanding New Play (nominee)

== Music featured in the play ==
A recording was made by BMG of the music in the play, which are recordings used as background music.

1. I Remember Clifford [7:12]
2. Rockin' Chair [3:08]
3. I Don't Stand A Ghost Of A Chance [7:25]
4. Daahoud [4:07]
5. Cristo Redentor [5:47]
6. Land's End [5:02]
7. Chelsea Bridge [3:27]
8. A Night In Tunisia [11:07]
9. Time [5:07]
10. It Never Entered My Mind [4:02]

RCA Victor released a CD compiled from the original recordings.
