= Sunshine State (film) =

- Theatrical release poster
- Directed by: John Sayles
- Screenplay by: John Sayles
- Produced by: Maggie Renzi
- Starring: Jane Alexander; Angela Bassett; Bill Cobbs; Edie Falco; Timothy Hutton; Alan King; Mary Steenburgen
- Cinematography: Patrick Cady
- Edited by: John Sayles
- Music by: Mason Daring
- Production company: Anarchist's Convention Films
- Distributed by: Sony Pictures Classics
- Release dates: May 19, 2002 (Cannes Film Festival); June 21, 2002 (United States)
- Running time: 141 minutes
- Country: United States
- Language: English
- Box office: $3.4 million

Sunshine State is a 2002 American independent drama film written and directed by John Sayles. The picture stars an ensemble cast that features Angela Bassett, Edie Falco, Jane Alexander, Alan King, Timothy Hutton, Mary Steenburgen, Bill Cobbs, and others. It was filmed on Amelia Island, Florida, which includes settings in Fernandina Beach. For her performance in the film, Falco received the Los Angeles Film Critics Association Award for Best Supporting Actress.

The film follows residents in two small communities, one white and one black, on an island in North Florida that are both targeted by private real estate developers to be gentrified into upscale resort properties for wealthy retirees.

== Plot ==
As the primarily white town of Delrona Beach, Florida, is preparing for its annual festival, one of the parade floats is set afire. A young black boy named Terrell is found guilty of the deed, and he is sentenced to community service with a local community theater. An orphan, Terrell is in the care of an elderly relative, Eunice Stokes, who lives in the neighboring, primarily black community of Lincoln Beach.

Eunice is being visited by her actress daughter, Desiree, a former beauty queen who left town while she was still in high school. At the time, she caused a scandal because she was pregnant by her boyfriend and her parents sent her to live with an aunt in Georgia until the baby came. She has returned to make amends to her mother and also to introduce her new husband, Reggie. While in town, she becomes reacquainted with her old high-school paramour, Flash, who was a star football player and is now a promoter for a property development scheme.

Back in Delrona Beach, Marly Temple runs a motel and cafe owned by her elderly father and drama-instructor mother. Marly feels shackled by the arrangement and is tempted to sell the hotel to developers, but she assumes her father will never agree. Marly wanted to be a marine biologist and was once an underwater performer, but when her twin older brothers died in an accident, she reluctantly became her father's heir. Marly must also deal with her former husband, Steve, a slacker who is always looking to make some quick money. Marly additionally has a boyfriend, Scotty, who is struggling to become a golf pro and travel the tour circuit. Marly then becomes romantically involved with Jack, a landscape architect affiliated with the property developers.

Offering commentary on the story are a group of golfers, who act as an updated iteration of the Greek chorus.

== Cast ==
- Alex Lewis as Terrell Wilkins
- Alan King as Murray Silver
- Cullen Douglas as Jefferson Cash
- Clifton James as Buster Bidwell
- Eliot Asinof as Silent Sam
- James McDaniel as Reggie Perry
- Angela Bassett as Desiree Stokes Perry
- Edie Falco as Marly Temple
- Timothy Hutton as Jack Meadows
- Perry Lang as Greg
- Miguel Ferrer as Lester
- Gordon Clapp as Earl Pinkney
- Mary Steenburgen as Francine Pinkney
- Bill Cobbs as Dr. Elton Lloyd
- Mary Alice as Mrs. Eunice Stokes
- Michael Greyeyes as Billy Trucks
- Sam McMurray as Todd Northrup
- Tim Powell as Buyer
- Brett Rice as Buyer #2
- Marc Blucas as Scotty Duval
- Charlayne Woodard as Loretta
- Tom Wright as Lee "Flash" Phillips
- Ralph Waite as Furman Temple
- Richard Edson as Steve Tregaskis
- Jane Alexander as Delia Temple
- Ashley Brumby as April

== Production ==
John Sayles wrote the script for the film with Edie Falco and Angela Bassett, a native of St. Petersburg, Florida, in mind, the latter whom he had previously worked with on City of Hope and Passion Fish.

Sunshine State was filmed on Florida's Amelia Island, which is located 30 or so miles north of Jacksonville.

== Reception ==
On review aggregate website Rotten Tomatoes, Sunshine State has an approval rating of 80% based on 110 reviews. The website's critics consensus reads, "Wonderfully acted, but the story and pacing can use a little work." Metacritic, which uses a weighted average, assigned the film a score of 69 out of 100, based on 32 critics, indicating "generally favorable" reviews.

In a positive review, Stephen Holden of The New York Times wrote the film "may be the most far-reaching civics lesson ever crammed into a 2-hour-21-minute film. But more important, it creates a cinematic mosaic of American lives unprecedented in its range, balance, subtlety and even-handedness." He added, "In telling overlapping stories, it is Mr. Sayles's first film to convey the sweep of a top-drawer Robert Altman movie."

In a review that awarded 3 1/2 stars out of 4, Roger Ebert wrote, "Because we are so familiar with the conventional approach to a story like this, it takes time to catch on that Sayles is not repeating the old progressive line about the little guy against big capital. He has made a more observant, elegiac, sad movie, about how the dreams of the parents are not the dreams of the children."

Of Falco, David Ansen of Newsweek wrote her "bruised, brusque, soulful Southern girl banishes all traces of Carmela Soprano."

== Awards ==
=== Wins ===
- Los Angeles Film Critics Association Awards: LAFCA Award - Best Supporting Actress, Edie Falco; 2002.
- National Board of Review: Special Recognition - For excellence in filmmaking, 2002.
- Black Reel Awards: Black Reel - Theatrical - Best Actress, Angela Bassett; 2003.
- Florida Film Critics Circle Awards: Golden Orange Award - John Sayles; For his witty satire that insightfully examines Florida's historic past, expanding present and uncertain future; 2003.
- NAACP Image Award: Image Award - Outstanding Actress in a Motion Picture, Angela Bassett; 2003.
- Satellite Award: Golden Satellite Award - Best Performance by an Actress in a Supporting Role, Drama, Edie Falco; 2003.
