= Judy Berlin =

1999 film

- Film poster
- Directed by: Eric Mendelsohn
- Written by: Eric Mendelsohn
- Produced by: Rocco Caruso
- Starring: Barbara Barrie; Bob Dishy; Edie Falco; Carlin Glynn; Aaron Harnick; Bette Henritze; Madeline Kahn; Julie Kavner; Anne Meara; Novella Nelson
- Cinematography: Jeffrey Seckendorf
- Edited by: Eric Mendelsohn
- Production company: Starz Encore Entertainment
- Distributed by: Shooting Gallery Film Series
- Release date: January 1999 (Sundance)
- Running time: 93 minutes
- Country: United States
- Language: English

Judy Berlin is a 1999 American independent drama film directed by Eric Mendelsohn. It was screened in the Un Certain Regard section at the 1999 Cannes Film Festival. Mendelsohn won the directing prize for Judy Berlin at the 1999 Sundance Film Festival. This was Madeline Kahn's final film appearance eleven months before her death on December 3, 1999.

== Plot ==
Told in a series of vignettes, the film opens on the morning of the second day of school. Principal Arthur Gold (Bob Dishy) is married to Alice (Madeline Kahn), although their union appears to be unhappy. Alice babbles frequently, much to Arthur’s chagrin. Their son David (Aaron Harnick), who is thirty, is depressed after a failed attempt at being a Hollywood filmmaker.

The school Arthur runs employs down-and-out teacher Sue Berlin (Barbara Barrie), who prepares her children to view the upcoming solar eclipse; secretary Bea (Anne Meara) and lunch lady Marie (Julie Kavner), who discuss dreams and astrology; and bus driver Ceil (Judy Graubart).

At the center of the story is aspiring actress Judy Berlin (Edie Falco), who is Sue's daughter. Unlike many of the characters in the film, she is upbeat, excitable and enthusiastic. While on a walk, David runs into Judy, who is his former high school classmate. Judy discusses her big plans for Hollywood and is overjoyed to hear David is a filmmaker. He refuses to tell her about his failure.

During class, while her students are making paper cutouts in order to view the eclipse, Dolores Engler (Bette Henritze) wanders into the classroom and asks the children to look outside. Although a seemingly pleasant woman, she shows symptoms of dementia, as she is forgetful and emotionally unbalanced. When Sue asks her to leave, Dolores hits her and is removed from the classroom.

David visits the town's historical society, where Judy is working as a museum demonstrator. She tells him she hates her job and then asks him out to lunch. As they eat, they discuss their dreams of filmmaking; David says he hopes to make a documentary about a town similar to the one in which they live. Judy is disillusioned by this.

Arthur checks on Sue, who at first assures him she’s fine before breaking down, and saying she will not play games, hinting at her romantic interest in him. He also appears to be interested romantically in her.

The solar eclipse begins, and the landscape takes on an ethereal, dreamlike appearance. Alice is greatly moved by the eclipse, and takes her cleaning lady Carol (Novella Nelson), on a walk, calling out to her neighbors in ghostly moans and pretending to walk on the Moon. She stops by neighbor Maddie’s (Carlin Glynn) house to see her refurbished kitchen, to which Maddie informs Alice that she thought they were not on good terms after Alice called her months ago in a rage. Alice does not recall this incident, hinting that Alice might have a form of dementia herself. Then they see Arthur arrive home, before he hurries back to the school. Alice declares cryptically that her husband has left her.

As the eclipse reaches totality, Sue dismisses her class and Arthur visits her again, where they share a brief kiss. Judy and David continue their walk, where they reminisce over high school and Judy admits she had a crush on David due to his quiet, misanthropic nature. They come to a playground where Judy sings an old childhood riddle as she frolicks among the equipment. When they return to the museum, David kisses Judy and then, seeing her unaffected by it, denounces her dreams of Hollywood by telling her the competitive nature of the film industry. Judy is disheartened and runs away.

Alice and Carol continue their walk, until Carol is relieved of duty and drives off. Alice meets up with Mr. V (Peter Appel), who tells her of an upcoming appointment. Alice continues on, giving a monologue that shows her disconnect to reality and also her love for Arthur.

Undeterred by David, Judy plans to leave on train for Queens. David catches her and apologizes and admits to hating goodbyes. Judy tells him that she will star in one of his movies someday and then boards the train and leaves. Alice and Arthur greet each other quietly in the streets, and Sue catches Dolores wandering around and tells her that everything will be alright, as the sun begins to show itself again, ending the film.

== Cast ==
- Barbara Barrie as Suzan "Sue" Berlin
- Bob Dishy as Arthur Gold
- Edie Falco as Judy Berlin
- Carlin Glynn as Maddie
- Aaron Harnick as David Gold
- Bette Henritze as Dolores Engler
- Madeline Kahn as Alice Gold
- Julie Kavner as Marie
- Anne Meara as Bea
- Novella Nelson as Carol
- Peter Appel as Mr. V.
- Marcia DeBonis as Lisa
- Glenn Fitzgerald as Tour guide
- Marcus Giamatti as Eddie Dillon
- Judy Graubart as Ceil

== See also ==
- List of films featuring eclipses
