= Eric Mendelsohn =

American film director

- Born: November 1, 1964 (age 61); Old Bethpage, Long Island, New York
- Occupations: Film director Screenwriter
- Years active: 1993-present

Eric Mendelsohn (born November 1, 1964) is an American film director and screenwriter.

== Biography ==
Two of his films have been screened in the Un Certain Regard section at Cannes: Through an Open Window in 1992 and Judy Berlin in 1999, which won the Directing Award at the 1999 Sundance Film Festival. His third film, 3 Backyards, also earned the Directing Award at the Sundance Film Festival in 2010, making him the only person in history to receive that honor twice. Mendelsohn also co-wrote the screenplay of the 2017 film Love After Love with Russell Harbaugh.

He teaches at Columbia University's School of the Arts in New York City. Mendelsohn is one of five siblings. One of his brothers is author and critic Daniel Mendelsohn.

== Filmography ==
- Through an Open Window (1993)
- Judy Berlin (1999)
- 3 Backyards (2010)
