= 2012 Sundance Film Festival =

2012 film festival edition

- Festival poster
- Location: Park City
- Hosted by: Sundance Institute
- Festival date: January 19–29, 2012
- Language: English
- Website: sundance.org/festival
- 2013 Sundance Film Festival 2011 Sundance Film Festival

The 2012 Sundance Film Festival took place from January 19 until January 29, 2012 in Park City, Utah.

64 short films were selected for the festival from 7,675 submissions, including 27 international shorts from 3,592 submissions.

== Non-competition features ==
=== Midnight ===
- Black Rock
- Excision
- Grabbers
- John Dies at the End
- The Pact
- Shut Up and Play the Hits
- Tim and Eric's Billion Dollar Movie
- V/H/S

== Awards ==
- Grand Jury Prize: Documentary - The House I Live In
- Grand Jury Prize: Dramatic - Beasts of the Southern Wild
- World Cinema Jury Prize: Documentary - The Law in These Parts
- World Cinema Jury Prize: Dramatic - Violeta Went to Heaven (Violeta se Fue a Los Cielos)
- Audience Award: U.S. Documentary - The Invisible War
- Audience Award: U.S. Dramatic - The Surrogate (retitled The Sessions)
- World Cinema Audience Award: Documentary - Searching for Sugar Man
- World Cinema Audience Award: Dramatic - Valley of Saints
- Best of NEXT Audience Award - Sleepwalk with Me
- U.S. Directing Award: Documentary - The Queen of Versailles
- U.S. Directing Award: Dramatic - Middle of Nowhere
- World Cinema Directing Award: Documentary - 5 Broken Cameras
- World Cinema Directing Award: Dramatic - Teddy Bear
- Waldo Salt Screenwriting Award - Safety Not Guaranteed
- World Cinema Screenwriting Award - Young & Wild
- U.S. Documentary Editing Award - Detropia
- World Cinema Documentary Editing Award - Indie Game: The Movie
- Excellence in Cinematography Award: U.S. Documentary - Chasing Ice
- Excellence in Cinematography Award: U.S. Dramatic - Beasts of the Southern Wild
- World Cinema Cinematography Award: Documentary - Putin's Kiss
- World Cinema Cinematography Award: Dramatic - My Brother the Devil
- U.S. Documentary Special Jury Prize for an Agent of Change - Love Free or Die
- U.S. Documentary Special Jury Prize for Spirit of Defiance - Ai Weiwei: Never Sorry
- U.S. Dramatic Special Jury Prize for Excellence in Independent Film Producing - Smashed and Nobody Walks
- U.S. Dramatic Special Jury Prize for Ensemble Acting - The Surrogate (retitled The Sessions)
- World Cinema Dramatic Special Jury Prize for Artistic Vision - Can
- World Cinema Documentary Special Jury Prize for its Celebration of the Artistic Spirit - Searching for Sugar Man
- Jury Prize: Short Filmmaking - Fishing Without Nets
- Jury Prize: Short Film, U.S. Fiction - The Black Balloon
- Jury Prize: Short Film, International Fiction - The Return
- Jury Prize: Short Film, Non-Fiction - The Tsunami and the Cherry Blossom
- Jury Prize: Animated Short Film - A Morning Stroll
- Short Film Audience Award - The Debutante Hunters

== Juries ==
Jury members were announced on January 10, 2012. Presenters of awards are followed by asterisks:

U.S. Documentary Jury

- Fenton Bailey*
- Shari Berman
- Heather Croall*
- Charles Ferguson*
- Kim Roberts*

U.S. Dramatic Jury

- Justin Lin*
- Anthony Mackie*
- Cliff Martinez*
- Lynn Shelton*
- Amy Vincent*

World Documentary Jury

- Nick Fraser*
- Clara Kim*
- Jean-Marie Teno*

World Dramatic Jury

- Julia Ormond*
- Richard Peña*
- Alexei Popogrebski*

Alfred P. Sloan Jury

- Scott Burns
- Tracy Day
- Helen Fisher*

Short Film Jury

- Mike Judge*
- Dee Rees*
- Shane Smith*

Others who presented awards included Mike Birbiglia and Eric Wareheim.

== Premieres ==
The National Film Board of Canada (NFB) web documentary Bear 71 premiered January 20 in an installation at the festival's New Frontier multimedia program. The NFB documentary Payback, based on Margaret Atwood's Payback: Debt and the Shadow Side of Wealth, and the documentary A Place at the Table, also premiered at the festival.
