= List of Oz episodes =

The following is a list of the episodes of the HBO television drama Oz. Each episode addresses a particular theme, which is addressed during Augustus Hill's narratives as well as during various points in the actual episode. During the first six episodes of season 6, Hill shares the narration with another inmate. In the season 5 episode "Variety", the narratives are replaced by short songs sung by series characters, in a variety show format.

== Series overview ==
Season	Episodes		Originally released	
Season	Episodes		First released	Last released
1	8		July 12, 1997	August 25, 1997
2	8		July 11, 1998	August 31, 1998
3	8		July 14, 1999	September 1, 1999
4	16	8	July 12, 2000	August 30, 2000
4	16	8	January 7, 2001	February 25, 2001
5	8		January 6, 2002	February 24, 2002
6	8		January 5, 2003	February 23, 2003

== Episodes ==
=== Season 1 (1997) ===
The first season of Oz stars Ernie Hudson as Warden Leo Glynn, Terry Kinney as Emerald City Unit Manager Tim McManus, Harold Perrineau as inmate and narrator Augustus Hill, and Eamonn Walker as new inmate and devout Muslim Kareem Saïd.

It also stars Kirk Acevedo as Latino inmate Miguel Alvarez, Edie Falco as correctional officer Diane Whittlesey, Rita Moreno as prison counselor Sister Peter Marie Reimondo, Tony Musante as inmate and Mafia boss Nino Schibetta, Leon Robinson as inmate Jefferson Keane, J.K. Simmons as inmate and Aryan Brotherhood leader Vernon Schillinger, Lee Tergesen as new inmate Tobias Beecher, Sean Whitesell as cannibalistic inmate Donald Groves, Dean Winters as manipulative Irish inmate Ryan O'Reily, and BD Wong as the prison chaplain Father Ray Mukada.

Recurring guest stars included Adewale Akinnuoye-Agbaje as inmate and Homeboys gang leader Simon Adebisi, Rick Fox as inmate and former basketball star Jackson Vahue, goodfella Mike G as inmate and Schibetta's right-hand man Joey D'Angelo, Stephen Gevedon as biker inmate Scott Ross, Craig muMs Grant as inmate Arnold "Poet" Jackson, Željko Ivanek as Governor James Devlin, Tim McAdams as Homeboys inmate Johnny Post, George Morfogen as long-term inmate Bob Rebadow, Steve Ryan as corrupt Officer Mike Healy, Lauren Vélez as prison doctor Gloria Nathan, and J. D. Williams as Homeboys inmate Kenny Wangler.

Season 1 chronicled the spiritual and political journeys of many of the characters as they descend into insanity, rise and fall politically, and seek redemption. The season showed how the different gangs fight each other as well as the prison system, culminating in a riot in which the inmates take over Emerald City.

No. overall	No. in season	Title	Directed by	Written by	Original release date	US viewers (millions)	Theme
1	1	"The Routine"	Darnell Martin	Tom Fontana	July 12, 1997	3.45	Oswald Maximum Security Penitentiary
In Oswald Maximum Security Penitentiary ("Oz"), Warden Leo Glynn and Unit Manager Tim McManus preside over "Emerald City," an experimental cell block designed to promote rehabilitation among a select group of inmates. Tobias Beecher, a former lawyer convicted of killing a child while driving under the influence, is sent to Oz and finds it difficult to adjust to prison life. After being roomed with one of the most dangerous inmates, Simon Adebisi, Beecher is "saved" by Aryan inmate Vernon Schillinger - only to find that things go from bad to worse. Muslim Kareem Said arrives and declares that he now runs Oz. Another inmate, Dino Ortolani, makes enemies fast and ends up getting burned alive, in a move perpetrated by longstanding Irish inmate Ryan O'Reily.
2	2	"Visits, Conjugal and Otherwise"	Nick Gomez	Tom Fontana	July 14, 1997	2.90	Sex
Dino Ortolani's death sparks numerous outbursts from the Italians and the gangsters. Beecher gets a conjugal visit from his wife but has to ask Schillinger for permission first. Jefferson Keane wants to marry; Prison Chaplain, Father Ray Mukada, counsels Miguel Alvarez about the arrival of his unborn child with the help of his grandfather. Nino Schibetta finds Ortalani's killer, who is one of Keane's henchmen, Johnny Post, and the governor ends conjugal visits.
3	3	"God's Chillin'"	Jean de Segonzac	Tom Fontana	July 21, 1997	2.48	Religion
Intensity between the gangsters and wise guys ensues after Johnny Post's death. Glynn warns Schibetta, Keane, and Said to keep the peace, or he will lockdown the prison. Keane finds solace with Said, and O'Reily tries to lock him down for his protection. Alvarez feels that God is punishing him by giving his child a bad liver; he decides to cut himself up as a result.
4	4	"Capital P"	Darnell Martin	Tom Fontana	July 28, 1997	2.30	Capital Punishment
Governor Devlin reinstates capital punishment; Keane is the first man executed. Tobias Beecher tries to redeem himself by trying to appeal on Keane's behalf, but Schillinger forces him to stop. O'Reily plays a double agent by being loyal to both sides to cover up his own dirty business. Alvarez finds sorrow and peace after his son's death. Sister Peter Marie is fired for protesting against the death penalty but is rehired.
5	5	"Straight Life"	Leslie Libman & Larry Williams	Tom Fontana	August 4, 1997	1.99	Drugs
The drug epidemic grows as the staff's efforts to stop it fail. Schibetta sides with the gangsters and offers them a deal, only to find out that one of them is not who he says he is. Diane Whittlesey meets an old friend and joins him in smuggling cigarettes to make ends meet. Said is diagnosed with hypertension but refuses to take his medication. An anonymous tip leads to one of the officers' getting arrested for smuggling drugs into Oz. McManus and Sister Pete discover that Beecher has found a new addiction to kill his pain; Sister Pete tries to get him into counseling but with no luck. Schillinger decides to give him a makeover.
6	6	"To Your Health"	Alan Taylor	Tom Fontana	August 11, 1997	2.26	Health
The staff realize they are not dealing with senior inmates very well, so they decide to give them a senior citizens unit, with no success. McManus starts behaving strangely and is somewhat permanently attached to Em City. Rebadow decides to leave with God's aid but fails. Ricardo Alvarez has Alzheimer's, and Mukada and Sister Pete debate whether or not he should be released. Schillinger grows tired of Beecher and decides to get rid of him. O'Reily gives Beecher PCP, and Beecher takes a stand against Schillinger. O'Reily and Adebisi know that Schibetta is driving a wedge between them, so they concoct a plan to kill him. Basketball star Jackson Vahue comes to Oz. He is Augustus Hill's role model, and Hill tries to win his respect, but Vahue gets Hill to take drugs to prove his loyalty. Said suffers a heart attack, and Huseni Mershah, who does not share Said's enthusiasm, decides to let him die.
7	7	"Plan B"	Darnell Martin	Tom Fontana	August 18, 1997	2.85	Unplanned events
Following his heart attack, Said banishes Huseni Mershah, but Mershah tells Glynn and McManus about Said's plans to start a riot. Following a shakedown, Mershah is transferred out of Em City, where he is labeled an outcast and later commits suicide. Donald Groves, who wants to follow Said, decides to kill Glynn but by accident kills an officer in the process. While Groves is awaiting execution, the guards brutally beat the inmates in retaliation. Hill admires a cellist, Eugene Dobbins, and through this decides to find a role model other than Vahue. O'Reily and Adebisi take down Schibetta. Beecher manages to stand up to Schillinger by attacking him in the gym and defecating on his face.
8	8	"A Game of Checkers"	Jean de Segonzac	Tom Fontana	August 25, 1997	3.21	Revolution
After months of tension, a riot breaks loose in Em City, started by two inmates playing a game of checkers. McManus goes in to trade himself for a couple of wounded hostages, and the Governor decides to take back Em City by force.

=== Season 2 (1998) ===
The second season of Oz starred Kirk Acevedo as Latino inmate Miguel Alvarez, Ernie Hudson as Warden Leo Glynn, Terry Kinney as Emerald City Unit Manager Tim McManus, Rita Moreno as prison counselor Sister Peter Marie Reimondo, Harold Perrineau as inmate and narrator Augustus Hill, J.K. Simmons as reformed Aryan Brotherhood inmate Vernon Schillinger, Lee Tergesen as the mentally unstable inmate Tobias Beecher, Eamonn Walker as inmate and devout Muslim leader Kareem Saïd, and Dean Winters as manipulative Irish-American inmate Ryan O'Reily.

It also starred Adewale Akinnuoye-Agbaje as inmate and Homeboys gang leader Simon Adebisi, Edie Falco as correctional officer Diane Whittlesey, George Morfogen as long-term inmate Bob Rebadow, Lauren Vélez as prison doctor Gloria Nathan, and BD Wong as the prison chaplain Father Ray Mukada.

Recurring guest stars included Bryan Callen as Christian inmate Jonathan Coushaine, Kathryn Erbe as death row inmate Shirley Bellinger, Bill Fagerbakke as corrupt corrections officer Karl Metzger, Rick Fox as inmate and former basketball star Jackson Vahue, Craig muMs Grant as inmate Arnold "Poet" Jackson, Luis Guzmán as new inmate and Latino gang leader Raoul "El Cid" Hernandez, Željko Ivanek as Governor James Devlin, Jordan Lage as homosexual inmate Richie Hanlon, Eddie Malavarca as inmate and new leader of the mob Peter Schibetta, Tom Mardirosian as inmate Agamemnon "The Mole" Busmalis, Mark Margolis as Peter Schibetta's godfather and new inmate Antonio Nappa, Christopher Meloni as new inmate Chris Keller, Austin Pendleton as inmate and Alzheimer's patient William Giles, Evan Seinfeld as new biker inmate Jaz Hoyt, J. D. Williams as homeboy inmate Kenny Wangler, and Scott William Winters as Ryan O'Reily's brother, Cyril O'Reily. Tony Masters played by Steven Wishnoff, Fiona Zonioni and Kiki Dowling are introduced as The Gays when Emerald City reopens in episode 2.

Season two of Oz continued to show the aftermath of the riot and the lessons each character learned from it. Throughout the course of the season, each principal character was forced to confront their own demons, and some prevailed while others faltered.

No. overall	No. in season	Title	Directed by	Written by	Original release date	US viewers (millions)	Theme
9	1	"The Tip"	Nick Gomez	Tom Fontana	July 11, 1998	3.42	Blame/Lying
Following the riot's aftermath, Devlin starts an inquiry to investigate the riot's causes. Devlin hires law school dean Alvah Case to lead the investigation. While investigating, Case discovers that one inmate, Scott Ross, may have been murdered intentionally and that Whittlesey is responsible.
10	2	"Ancient Tribes"	Uli Edel	Story by : Tom Fontana; Teleplay by : Tom Fontana & Sean Jablonski	July 20, 1998	2.87	Forced perceptions
Ten months after the riot, Em City reopens, and McManus lays down new ground rules to make everybody's lives better. He starts by making a high school education program. Peter Schibetta, the son of the deceased mob boss Nino Schibetta, decides to find the person responsible for his father's death, O'Reily decides to give up Adebisi to protect himself. Schibetta knows a secret about Glynn, regarding his brother. Schillinger is up for parole, but Beecher does what he can to stop him. Glynn's daughter is brutally raped, and Glynn takes his frustrations out on Alvarez. O'Reily learns he has breast cancer.
11	3	"Great Men"	Bob Balaban	Story by : Tom Fontana; Teleplay by : Tom Fontana & Sean Jablonski	July 27, 1998	2.25	Historical impact
Alvarez finds out who raped Glynn's daughter but refuses to cooperate. An elderly inmate, Agamemnon Busmalis, decides to dig his way out of Oz. Kenny Wangler learns to read, but Adebisi makes him stop. Insane inmate William Giles starts talking to Sister Peter Marie in a strange way. Said, who has been reading up on judicial litigation, decides to help Hill when it is confirmed that the judge presiding over Hill's trial may have taken a bribe, as he did for other trials he presided over. Ryan O'Reily is visited by his mentally-challenged brother, Cyril, before undergoing breast cancer surgery at the prison's expense. Meanwhile, Schillinger decides to stop being nice and takes matters into his own hands. Shirley Bellinger, who has drowned her daughter, is the first woman sent to Death Row.
12	4	"Losing Your Appeal"	Keith Samples	Story by : Tom Fontana; Teleplay by : Tom Fontana & Bradford Winters	August 3, 1998	2.46	Love
The Aryan Brotherhood comes back in full force and makes one of the inmates take responsibility for a murder the Brotherhood committed. At Hill's hearing, the judge decides there was no misjustice in his conviction. McManus decides to make one of his students, Poet, famous. After O'Reily has surgery, he starts developing feelings for Dr. Nathan. Schibetta decides to get revenge on Adebisi by hiring Alvarez, while Adebisi tries to make a deal with Alvarez, who declines. Beecher gets a new cellmate, Chris Keller, who is actually working with Schillinger.
13	5	"Family Bizness"	Kathy Bates	Story by : Tom Fontana; Teleplay by : Tom Fontana & Bradford Winters	August 10, 1998	2.92	Family
The high school program comes to a permanent end after graduation. Poet, whose poetry was published, is released. McManus discovers the truth about Ross' murder. Hill wants to join in with Busmalis' escape. Glynn gives his brother up to stop Schibetta from taking power over him. Beecher and Keller's relationship deepens when Beecher's wife commits suicide. Sister Pete learns that what Giles is saying has something to do with her husband's death. O'Reily wants to prove his love for Dr. Nathan by having his brother kill her husband.
14	6	"Strange Bedfellows"	Alan Taylor	Tom Fontana	August 17, 1998	3.23	Consequences
Said represents Schillinger. Whittlesey lies about Ross' death, and so does McManus. Bellinger starts receiving love letters from an anonymous person. Schibetta tries to prove his capability to lead by taking down Adebisi, but ends up losing leadership. Alvarez loses his leadership of El Norte when Raoul "El Cid" Hernandez arrives. New inmate Jiggy Walker arrives with a secret regarding Governor Devlin that turns out to be false. Sister Pete learns that Giles killed the man who killed her husband and rewards him for his efforts. Cyril O'Reily is imprisoned for the murder of Dr. Nathan's husband. Beecher confesses his love for Keller, which results in Keller's getting sent to the hole, and Beecher drowns his sorrows in alcohol.
15	7	"Animal Farm"	Mary Harron	Story by : Tom Fontana; Teleplay by : Tom Fontana and Debbie Sarjeant	August 24, 1998	2.75	Animals
A lonely Beecher continues to drink while missing Keller. Schillinger sets his sights on Cyril, and Ryan tries to get him away from Schillinger. McManus sets the condition that O'Reily must first confess to murdering Preston Nathan. The Senate passes a law which requires sex offenders to register with their community; Robert Sippel, a former priest imprisoned for molesting a 14-year-old boy, is released after 10 years, much to the dismay of the community. Hill tries to figure out a way to escape from Oz. After being rejected by Bellinger, Adebisi continues to use on a regular basis. Mob boss Antonio Nappa arrives to take revenge on Adebisi by organizing random drug testing. Another new inmate, Kipkeme Jara, is disgusted with Adebisi, who starts to have illusions about Jara. Rebadow learns that his grandson is dying from leukemia and wants to go to Disney World. One of the inmates, Jaz Hoyt, gets most of the prisoners in Em City to donate money to Rebadow's grandson. Hernandez lets Alvarez prove his loyalty to him by blinding a C.O. and former rival gang member, Eugene Rivera. McManus, feeling guilty about lying about Ross' murder, breaks it off with Whittlesey by transferring her out of Em City. Poet is sent back to Oz for murder and drugs.
16	8	"Escape from Oz"	Jean de Segonzac	Tom Fontana	August 31, 1998	3.24	Escaping prison life
Aryan prisoner Mark Mack finds Busmalis' tunnel and arranges for Karl Metzger, a new C.O. supervisor secretly working with the Brotherhood, to transfer him and his cellmate to Rebadow and Busmalis' cell. Mack and his cellmate are killed when the tunnel collapses on them. Hill figures out a way to escape. Sippel has a rough time adjusting to life on the outside; he comes back to Oz to work for Mukada and meet the man he molested 10 years ago. Schillinger is disgusted with Sippel and crucifies him in the middle of the gym. Alvarez blinds Rivera and realizes he will not be able to adjust to Solitary. Ryan O'Reily's blood type is the only match to that of Rivera, who is in desperate need of a blood transfusion. O'Reily will help only on the condition that Cyril is transferred to Em City. He then confesses his part in Preston Nathan's murder. Keller is released from the hole and breaks it off with Beecher, and he and Schillinger, along with Metzger, break Beecher's heart and other things in the process. Adebisi continues to suffer delusions and finds peace, which Nappa sees as an opportunity to rally the other gangsters and set up Adebisi for murdering Jara. As a result, Adebisi is sent to the psych ward. Devlin offers Said clemency, resulting in making the other Muslim prisoners jealous. Said humiliates Devlin by exposing the truth of his actions after the riot and rejecting the pardon. Hill goes along with his plan to escape.

=== Season 3 (1999) ===
The third season of Oz starred Kirk Acevedo as Latino inmate Miguel Alvarez, Adewale Akinnuoye-Agbaje as inmate Simon Adebisi, Ernie Hudson as Warden Leo Glynn, Terry Kinney as Emerald City Unit Manager Tim McManus, Rita Moreno as prison counselor Sister Peter Marie Reimondo, Harold Perrineau as inmate and narrator Augustus Hill, J.K. Simmons as Aryan Brotherhood inmate Vernon Schillinger, Lee Tergesen as the mentally unstable inmate Tobias Beecher, Eamonn Walker as inmate and devout Muslim leader Kareem Saïd, and Dean Winters as manipulative Irish inmate Ryan O'Reily.

It also starred Kathryn Erbe as death row inmate Shirley Bellinger, Edie Falco as correctional officer Diane Whittlesey, Luis Guzmán as inmate and Latino gang leader Raoul "El Cid" Hernandez, Mark Margolis as inmate and Italian gang leader Antonio Nappa, Christopher Meloni as inmate Chris Keller, George Morfogen as longterm inmate Robert 'Bob' Rebadow, Lauren Vélez as prison doctor Gloria Nathan, and BD Wong as the prison chaplain Father Ray Mukada, Granville Adams as Muslim inmate Zahir Arif, Arija Bareikis as Tricia Ross, the sister of dead inmate Scott Ross, Philip Casnoff as new Russian inmate Nikolai Stanislofsky, Robert Clohessy as new head CO of Emerald City Sean Murphy, Seth Gilliam as new CO Clayton Hughes, Tom Mardirosian as inmate Agamemnon "The Mole" Busmalis, Craig muMs Grant as inmate Arnold "Poet" Jackson, Kristin Rohde as new CO Claire Howell, J. D. Williams as inmate and Homeboy gang leader Kenny Wangler, and Scott William Winters as inmate Cyril O'Reily.

No. overall	No. in season	Title	Directed by	Written by	Original release date	US viewers (millions)	Theme
17	1	"The Truth and Nothing But..."	Nick Gomez	Tom Fontana	July 14, 1999	2.69	The truth
The prison is renamed Oswald State Correctional Facility Level 4. Governor Devlin makes a deal with Weigart, a pharmaceutical corporation, to cut costs to the state prison medical board. This results in Alvarez, who is suicidal, having his medicine rejected and his not being fed in retaliation for blinding Rivera. Wangler, who dubs himself "Brickz", takes new inmate Malcolm Coyle under his wing. Nappa who suspects he is undercover, decides to have Wangler prove his loyalty to him. Adebisi is released from the psych ward and decides not to fight back. Clayton Hughes, who is a close friend of Glynn, whose father was killed in the line of action, is hired. Another new CO, Claire Howell, sets her sights on McManus. O'Reily wants to get revenge on Schillinger by causing trouble between Schillinger and the bikers. Richie Hanlon is sent to death row, and Bellinger finds him intriguing. Said meets Scott Ross' sister to try to persuade her to join the lawsuit; during this meeting, he starts to show feelings for her. McManus learns the truth about Metzger and tries to get Beecher to testify about what happened to him. Beecher declines. Keller starts to feel guilty for his part and wants to prove his love to Beecher, so he confesses the truth to McManus. Beecher gets revenge on Metzger.
18	2	"Napoleon's Boney Parts"	Matt Dillon	Tom Fontana	July 21, 1999	3.18	Napoléon Bonaparte
With Metzger dead, McManus brings in a childhood friend, Sean Murphy, to become supervisor. With Murphy's help, McManus organizes a boxing tournament. Coyle, who is working in the barbershop, confesses a strange tale to Hill, who does not take the news very well. A lawsuit is in effect against the state. Said, who does not want his judgment about his faith clouded, decides to fast. McManus and Howell's relationship takes a turn for the worse. Hughes feels he does not have what it takes to be a C.O. Schillinger's son is arrested for possession of drugs. Keller is sent back to Em City, but Schillinger exacts his revenge on him. Adebisi ostensibly wants to work in the AIDS ward in hopes of learning about the disease, but his true motives become clear when he gets revenge on Nappa. Alvarez continues to show signs of agitation. Dr. Fredrick Garvey, who heads the organization administering health care at Oz, gives Dr. Nathan two weeks' notice for disagreeing with him. Mukada tries to comfort Alvarez by giving him food. When Alvarez refuses the food, the C.O.s once again take their frustrations out on him. Sister Pete decides to start a victim/offender program; Mukada wants the first session to be between Alvarez and Rivera. Glynn disagrees, and Alvarez attempts to end his pain the only way he knows how.
19	3	"Legs"	Keith Samples	Tom Fontana	July 28, 1999	3.01	Running
Following Alvarez's suicide attempt, Dr. Nathan decides to expose Garvey. Devlin instead exposes Garvey's past on the condition that Weigart revise its policies. Hill is in protective custody for exposing Coyle's murdering of a family. Said and other leaders want to protect Hill, but Nappa takes matters in his own hands. Said's efforts to practice his religion take another turn when he and the other Muslim prisoners go on a hunger strike. McManus and Glynn have no choice but to give in by allowing Said to have food in his cell. Howell tries to apologize to McManus for her actions. However, McManus still wants to break things off with her. After assaulting a prisoner, Howell is fired. The boxing tournament gets underway with Pancamo and Cyril winning their first matches. O'Reily fixes Cryil's fight to ensure that he will not be damaged more. Rebadow has diabetes. After he faints, he decides to meet his son and grandson, whom he has never met and who were unaware of his existence at Oz. Nappa discovers he is HIV positive and is transferred out of Em City. Keller continues to attempt to patch things up with Beecher. The arrival of Schillinger's son in Em City gives Beecher new hope that he will be able to get revenge on Schillinger.
20	4	"Unnatural Disasters"	Chazz Palminteri	Tom Fontana & Bradford Winters	August 4, 1999	2.86	God's will
Beecher befriends Schillinger's son as a means to get back at Schillinger. Howell sues McManus for sexual harassment and is reinstated. Said cannot fight his feelings for Patricia Ross. Keller manipulates Sister Pete after discovering why she became a nun. Rivera agrees to meet with Alvarez. Alvarez is released from Solitary. Once again, O'Reily uses his tricks to have a fight fixed. Hughes tries to earn respect his own way, which costs him his position in Em City. Hughes is transferred to the library. Hanlon's murder conviction is overturned. Nikolai Stanislofsky gets revenge but slits the wrong throat. Nappa decides to confess everything he has done in the course of his life. Adebisi recruits the Latinos to try to run with the Sicilians' drug trade. Wangler gets disturbing news that his son may be getting hurt and gets his comrades to take care of the matter.
21	5	"U.S. Male"	Steve Buscemi	Tom Fontana & Bradford Winters	August 11, 1999	3.33	U.S. Postal Service
Hamid Khan defeats Wangler in the final first-round boxing match. In an act of revenge for the Homeboys, Poet delivers a poem attacking Said. Said's fellow Muslims also condemn him for continuing to meet with Patricia Ross. Said has a heated confrontation with them when he learns that Ross has received threatening messages demanding that she cut off contact with him. New inmate Yuri Kosygin, a Russian gangster, sparks animosity between the Sicilians and Russians when he declines Nappa's offer of friendship. Wangler learns that his contract has been carried out, and his wife and her lover are dead. While Wangler attends their funeral, Adebisi severely wounds Pierce and Poet, in a bid to regain control of the Homeboys. Adebisi returns to his old self. McManus prepares for his sexual harassment trial and is enraged when Dr. Nathan does not immediately agree to serve as a character witness. Officer Hughes begins investigating his father's murder and becomes aggressive while questioning Rebadow. Father Mukada witnesses the incident and offers Hughes emotional support, but Hughes declines. Beecher comforts and bonds with Andrew Schillinger, as he gives up drugs and goes through withdrawal. Beecher uses his influence over Andrew to taunt and threaten Vern Schillinger. Vern tries to improve his relationship with his son, but Andrew rejects him and white supremacy. After assaulting Vern, Andrew is put in solitary confinement, where Vern tests him by passing drugs to him through Officer Lopresti. Andrew cannot resist the drugs and suffers a fatal overdose.
22	6	"Cruel and Unusual Punishments"	Terry Kinney	Tom Fontana	August 18, 1999	3.69	Punishment
William Cudney, who has been stealing chloral hydrate for Ryan O'Reily, realizes that O'Reily has been using it to drug some of the boxing contestants, fixing the matches. In order to save his own soul, Cudney plans to turn O'Reily in, but O'Reily hires Kosygin to "save him". With his brother's help, Cyril O'Reily defeats Pancamo in the next match. Stanislofsky attempts to bring Kosygin down, telling Pancamo that Kosygin has been fixing the boxing matches. Kosygin attacks Stanislofsky, almost killing him, but is stopped and taken to the hole. Nappa decides to write a memoir with the help of his new cellmate, Nat Ginzburg. Pancamo hears of this and decides that Nappa must be stopped, since his memoir might include confessions implicating the other Italians. At McManus' suggestion, Wangler enrolls in a parenting program and has a visit with his infant son, but he storms out when the baby seems uncomfortable around him. Adebisi, who is keeping Wangler tied up at night, plots to bring McManus down. Father Mukada takes up the investigation of Hughes' father's death, interviewing Giles, who tells him Glynn was the killer. Keller tries to repair his relationship with Beecher, but Beecher continues to rebuff him. Beecher goes to Said for spiritual counsel. Khan disagrees with Said's decision to include Beecher in their group; he rejects Said and takes over leadership of the Muslims.
23	7	"Secret Identities"	Adam Bernstein	Tom Fontana & Sunil Nayar	August 25, 1999	3.44	One's true identity
Alvarez meets with Rivera and his wife, but when they ask him why he mutilated Rivera, he does not fully explain his reasons. Sister Pete determines that Keller has been manipulating her, trying to earn her favor so that she might convince Beecher to forgive him. Realizing that she is sexually attracted to Keller, she decides to leave the convent. Carlo Ricardo, whose family has been visiting him since he came to Oz and started to whittle down, is put in solitary confinement for refusing to cooperate in an investigation of the drug trade at Oz; this causes him to miss his final visit with his sister, who is moving away. After Father Mukada confronts Glynn about Hughes' father's murder, Glynn finally tells Hughes what happened, confessing that his own foolish behavior with the inmates led to the fatal beating. Nappa completes his memoir, but Ginzburg secretly conspires with Pancamo, killing Nappa and destroying the memoir. McManus tells Whittlesey that he still has feelings for her; she kisses him in front of Claire Howell. McManus' legal problems worsen when Wangler makes a claim that McManus groped him, and Adebisi gets the media involved in the story. Bellinger's final appeal is denied, and after seeking McManus' advice about execution methods, she decides on a hanging. Soon afterward, though, an exam reveals she is pregnant. The final semi-finals boxing match sees Khan defeat Cramer by split decision. Beecher continues to explore Islam with Said, who recommends that he forgive Keller and Schillinger. Beecher and Keller reconcile, but Schillinger refuses to forgive Beecher and attacks him instead; Said and Keller intervene, setting off a melee between the Muslims and Aryans in which Beecher and Schillinger are stabbed.
24	8	"Out o' Time"	Barbara Kopple	Tom Fontana	September 1, 1999	3.94	The new year, end of the millennium
After refusing to tell Glynn who raped his daughter following the end of the meeting with Rivera, Alvarez is cast out and attacked by the other Latinos, but he defends himself, killing Ricardo in the process. He then tells Glynn that Ricardo was responsible for Ardith Glynn's rape. After hearing Bellinger's stories about her daughter being possessed by Satan, Sister Pete decides that Bellinger is mentally ill and convinces Governor Devlin to commute her sentence. This infuriates Bellinger, who had stated a desire to be executed. Ryan O'Reily is caught and forced to stop fixing the boxing matches with chloral hydrate, but he still manages to give Cyril an advantage in the final match, manipulating Cyril with thoughts of their abusive father. Cyril is so enraged that his knockout punch leaves opponent Khan brain dead. Cyril, who feels guilty about what happened, attacks O'Reily but breaks down. Khan's widow wants her husband removed from life support, but they refuse. She then threatens to sue the prison for negligence. On New Year's Eve, Racial tensions escalate amongst inmates and staff; Schillinger attempts to rally the white inmates despite their differences, while Adebisi does the same with the black inmates. Hughes begins to adopt Adebisi's views on race, and when he expresses these views to Glynn, Glynn fires him. Hill tries to stay out of the racial conflict, but when he is put in solitary confinement for defying Murphy, the inmates become more defiant. As the new millennium arrives, Glynn puts the prison on lockdown, and Adebisi finds a gun in his bed.

=== Season 4 (2000–01) ===
No. overall	No. in season	Title	Directed by	Written by	Original release date	US viewers (millions)	Theme
25	1	"A Cock and Balls Story"	Adam Bernstein	Tom Fontana	July 12, 2000	2.56	The U.S. prison system
The lockdown ends. Khan is taken off life support, and Arif assumes leadership of the Muslims. Cyril O'Reily feels guilty about Khan and has recurring nightmares about the two men he has killed. Sister Pete tries to help by setting up a victim/offender meeting between Dr. Nathan and the O'Reily brothers, but Nathan refuses to participate. During recreation time for the inmates in solitary confinement, Giles overhears Alvarez saying that Louie Bevilacqua was the true culprit in Ardith Glynn's rape; Giles stabs both inmates, killing Bevilacqua, but wounding Alvarez. Beecher continues to seek Schillinger's forgiveness and decides, against Keller's wishes, to help Schillinger find his other son Hank. This leads to tension and an eventual fistfight between Beecher and Keller. Bellinger returns to death row after miscarrying under suspicious circumstances. Governor Devlin's campaign manager invites Glynn to run for lieutenant governor alongside Devlin. McManus is upset to learn that Whittlesey, while on vacation, became engaged and will not return to Oz. Three new inmates enter Emerald City, one of them, John Basil, an undercover police officer investigating the prison drug trade. Another new inmate, Guillaume Tarrant, is bullied by Wangler, Poet and Pierce when they return to Emerald City. O'Reily advises Tarrant to stand up for himself if given the opportunity; soon afterward, Tarrant finds a gun exactly like Adebisi's in his bed. When the Homeboys harass him again, Tarrant opens fire on the common area, shooting Wangler, Pierce, Keller, and an officer before turning the gun on himself.
26	2	"Obituaries"	Kenneth Fink	Tom Fontana	July 19, 2000	3.02	Newspaper obituaries
After the shooting, which left Wangler, Pierce and two others dead, Glynn is forced to fire McManus in order to cement his candidacy for lieutenant governor. Keller is in the hospital after being wounded in the shooting; Beecher reaffirms his love for Keller despite Said's insistence that homosexuality is sinful. Beecher also succeeds in setting up a visit between Schillinger and his son Hank. Basil, the undercover agent, has a visit with his partner; when Hill says that the partner looks familiar, Basil worries about being exposed. Said's trial is underway, and he meets again with Patricia Ross, who admits she is attracted to him. When the time comes for Said to testify, he refuses to wear the orange jumpsuit that is required in order for him to appear in court. Beecher testifies instead, afraid that Said might want the trial to fail so that he can continue to indict the United States legal system. Jason Cramer discovers that his own trial may have been influenced by anti-gay prejudice amongst the jury, and he asks Said for legal help. Ryan O'Reily learns that Stanislofsky has a cell phone, and he attempts to obtain it. Stanislofsky resists O'Reily and has one of the new inmates, Galino, killed in order to protect his secret, but eventually, he agrees to work with O'Reily. Hernandez and the Latinos continue trying to kill Alvarez, but instead, Alvarez escapes with Busmalis through his newly completed tunnel.
27	3	"The Bill of Wrongs"	Goran Gajić	Tom Fontana	July 26, 2000	2.08	The Bill of Rights
After their escape, Busmalis is apprehended, but Alvarez remains at large. New inmate Enrique Morales assumes control of the Latinos by coercing Rebadow into killing Hernandez. Before his death, though, Hernandez tells Glynn that Officer Hughes was responsible for giving Adebisi the gun used in the recent shooting. Hughes admits to this, and Glynn arrests him. Glynn is also occupied with his campaign for lieutenant governor; he decides of hiring an African-American for the job of running Em City to get voter sympathy of the community. Basil begins using drugs as he attempts to work his way into the prison drug trade. Said says goodbye to Patricia Ross, who plans to move out of state when the prison riot trial is over; he also manages to get Cramer a new trial. Bellinger tells her ex-husband that his father raped her, and the daughter she murdered was the product of that rape. After a rocky victim/offender interaction between the Nathans and the O'Reily brothers, Dr. Nathan is raped. Schillinger learns that his visit with his son Hank was arranged by Beecher; assuming that Beecher is trying to manipulate him, he has Hank kidnap Beecher's children.
28	4	"Works of Mercy"	Adam Bernstein	Tom Fontana	August 2, 2000	3.08	Mercy
A search for Beecher's children is under way, and Beecher is convinced Schillinger is behind the kidnapping. The situation worsens when Schillinger has his son mail Beecher a package containing a child's severed hand. Keller returns from the hospital seeming distressed after his brush with death; he and Beecher comfort each other, but Sister Pete still refuses to see him. Basil makes progress in earning the trust of Adebisi, Pancamo, and Morales, but is assigned the final test of committing a murder. Said provides legal assistance to Cramer but has second thoughts when it seems that Cramer's sentence might actually be overturned. Said withdraws from the case because he believes Cramer is guilty, but Cramer receives a not guilty verdict nonetheless and is released. The new Emerald City manager, Martin Querns, tells Adebisi he will turn a blind eye to the drug trade as long as there is no violence. Hughes, out on bail before his trial begins, campaigns against Devlin and Glynn. McManus returns, and Glynn hires him to run Unit B. Dr. Nathan also returns to work and confronts Ryan O'Reily, accusing him of ordering her rape. Although he accepts responsibility and taunts Nathan, driving her into a rage, Sister Pete believes he is innocent, and he later indicates that he was not in fact involved. Bellinger is executed; before her death, she tells Glynn that she was having sex with Lopresti, but he was not the man who impregnated her. She gives Father Mukada a hint as to that person's identity.
29	5	"Gray Matter"	Brian Cox	Tom Fontana	August 9, 2000	2.79	The human brain
Basil meets an old comrade, Bruno Goergen who threatens to expose his identity. Basil decides to make him his victim with Hill's unexpected help. Word is out on Glynn's brother's sentence but Devlin decides to use this and his daughter's rape to get the upper hand in the election. Querns' attempt at a no violence unit sees him transfer the Aryan and biker inmates and make Adebisi, Pancamo, and Morales trustees. O'Reily meets the person responsible for Dr. Nathan's rape, and he succeeds in getting the cell phone from Stanislofsky. Rebadow starts to become a different man when he asks Morales to kill someone. Beecher and the FBI think that Keller is responsible for kidnapping Beecher's children and his son's death; this causes another riff between Beecher and Keller only to have Schillinger throw everyone off guard, when Mukada tells Schillinger the truth he spares Beecher's daughter.
30	6	"A Word to the Wise"	Keith Samples	Tom Fontana	August 16, 2000	3.10	Figures of speech
As more white inmates are transferred out of Em City, Said starts to show concern about Querns' policy. Arif sees Kevin Ketchum, aka Supreme Allah, as a threat but Adebisi sees him as an ally. McManus brings in his former buddies from Em City to Unit B. Nathaniel Ginzburg decides to accept his fate and wants to be executed as soon as possible only to have him die on his execution date. Basil's attempt to shut down the drug trade is unsuccessful when he confesses to Sister Pete about his new addiction. After Beecher discovers that it was the Schillingers who kidnapped his children, he tries to once again forgive Keller but Keller cuts him off completely and he confesses to Mukada about his past in which Mukada says he needs to confess to the police before being absolved, Meanwhile Beecher tries to find a new love with a new cellmate. Rebadow decides who he wants to kill only for it to backfire on him. O'Reily proves his love for Dr. Nathan by killing Patrick Keenan, following this, she decides to take a leave of absence.
31	7	"A Town Without Pity"	J. Miller Tobin	Tom Fontana	August 23, 2000	3.12	Prison economics
O'Reily finds a new soulmate in Claire Howell and gets her to take care of some business. Keller exacts revenge on the one that lied to Beecher only to have him die under bizarre circumstances. When Hank Schillinger gets off on a technicality for kidnapping Beecher's children, Beecher wants revenge on Schillinger so he hires someone to kill Hank. Rebadow hears strange voices in his head. Basil continues to go down the path of drugs. Arif decides to let Said regain leadership to stop Adebisi. Adebisi's efforts to get Said on his side seem successful. And Hughes makes a statement by eliminating Devlin.
32	8	"You Bet Your Life"	Adam Bernstein	Tom Fontana	August 30, 2000	3.46	Gambling
After the assassination attempt on Devlin, Glynn decides to pull out of the election. Basil is forced to confess that he killed Goergen, ending all hope of eliminating the drug trade. Sister Pete finally comes to peace after Keller had manipulated her into what she was. In Death Row, Moses Deyell is fed up with his neighbor, Mark Miles and shuts him up. Schillinger gets a visit from a strange woman who is Hank's wife. Keller and O'Reily decide to help eliminate Adebisi's idea of a utopia. Said ends Adebisi's dreams and the two have a fight to the death.
33	9	"Medium Rare"	Alex Zakrzewski	Story by : Tom Fontana & Sunil Nayar; Teleplay by : Tom Fontana	January 7, 2001	3.06	News and the media
Following the death of Adebisi, a news crew comes to make a documentary on life in prison. Worrying that they may uncover the truth about Adebisi, McManus insists they go after Querns. While starting to follow new inmate, Omar White, News anchor, Jack Eldridge, spends the night in the cell with Cyril O'Reily who he met years ago and gets a little payback.
34	10	"Conversions"	Adam Bernstein	Tom Fontana	January 14, 2001	2.79	Converting
McManus sets some new rules in Em City. Miguel Alvarez is caught and brought back to prison and Guerra targets him to no avail. Howell continues to stalk Ryan O'Reily, Dr. Nathan returns to Oz to learn more about why O'Reily killed Patrick Keenan. Devlin is inaugurated for a second term in office and Glynn gets a new secretary while he is struggling with a separation. Busmalis proposes to Norma Clarke and plans to escape Oz with Rebadow to marry her. Leroy Tidd wants to "convert" to Islam but Said, who is experiencing sudden urges of rage, rejects him. Schillinger finds salvation with former televangelist, Jeremiah Cloutier. Beecher makes Keller jealous by sleeping with his new cellmate, Ronald Barlog, who Keller knew years ago. Burr Redding tries to take control of the homeboys but the arrival of Chinese immigrants gives Pancamo and Morales an idea to stop him.
35	11	"Revenge is Sweet"	Goran Gajić	Tom Fontana	January 21, 2001	3.75	Revenge
Glynn releases Alvarez on condition that he becomes his informant, Morales gives him the chance to come back if he kills Redding. Dr. Nathan institutes a new drug that will cause an inmate to age the same number of years he serves, The O'Reilys join up to try to get released. Jackson Vayhue is up for parole but Hill arranges for the woman Vayhue almost raped to not let him go free. William Giles is sentenced to death, Said finally accepts Tidd, who is working with the Aryans to kill Said, first chance he gets. Beecher and Schillinger meet in an interaction where Schillinger is quoting from the bible. Robson and Hoyt see Cloutier as a threat, while Timmy Kirk tries to woo Cloutier. As Busmalis is making preparations for the wedding, his latest tunnel is discovered. Glynn has Hughes transferred to Unit J, a unit they put corrupt cops in and where Basil is. The FBI makes a deal with Barlog to reduce his sentence if he testifies against Keller, who decides to shut him up.
36	12	"Cuts Like a Knife"	Steve Buscemi	Tom Fontana	January 28, 2001	2.81	Shanks
Alvarez decides to withdraw himself to solitary for a while where he experiments with his bodily fluids. Rebadow speaks on behalf of Busmalis who Glynn allows to get married. Cyril starts to show the effects of the aging pill while another inmate dies as a result. Tidd gets closer Said but after getting his opportunity to kill, he has a change of heart. White decides to let everyone know to fear him by stabbing McManus. Hughes believes that he a political prisoner. Before the immigrants get sent back to China, one of them meets Jia Kenmin and makes a deal to kill Morales, for killing one of the migrants. Supreme Allah is released and makes a deal with Pancamo and Morales to kill Redding, who explains to Hill that he ratted him to cops years ago. Father Mukada returns and is disappointed that Kirk has converted to Protestantism. Schillinger finds out about Hank's death and suspects that Beecher is involved, Beecher offers to die but Keller makes a sacrifice for him which sees him transferred out of Oz.
37	13	"Blizzard of '01"	Leslie Libman	Tom Fontana	February 4, 2001	3.40	Snow
With the arrival of a blizzard, Dr. Nathan is sued by the board of Ethics for misconduct in the aging pill trial. O'Reily meets Suzanne Fitzgerald, a woman who claims to be his mother. Hughes continues to cause trouble in Unit J. As Busmalis' wedding date arrives, she leaves him standing at the altar. Mukada and Cloutier have a feud to try to see who saves the most souls in Oz but decide to have an ecumenical service. Hank's wife, Carrie goes into labor when hearing of the news of his death. Beecher is up for parole and might be released on the circumstances based on his two recent losses. Vayhue decides to stop using drugs when thinking of his roots. Redding goes to war but Hill confesses the danger to the COs based on how Redding raised him. Giles decides to be executed by being stoned to death, a punishment that is said to be cruel and unusual while Deyell decides he wants to donate his organs. Robson decides to finish off Said his own way, which costs Tidd his life. Ratings: 6.9 million viewers
38	14	"Orpheus Descending"	Gloria Muzio	Tom Fontana & Sunil Nayar & Sean Whitesell	February 11, 2001	3.71	Orpheus
McManus returns and has Redding and Morales call a truce. Supreme Allah arranges for Hill to kill Redding, whom Redding disowns. Hughes makes it clear he is to be feared by eliminating Basil. Beecher talks with Keller, which ends in sorrow. Schillinger learns that his grandchild might not be related by blood. Cloutier talks with the man who killed Tidd to save his soul. McManus arranges for a best 2 out of 3 basketball game against Jackson Vayhue where McManus is teamed with Dave Brass against Vayhue and Busmalis, which sees Vayhue and Busmalis win the first match. Moses tries to escape at the cost of his life. IRA supporter, Pauric Connelly arrives and gets the attention of O'Reily. After knocking out Jia Kenmin, the staff argue about shipping Cyril to the insane asylum but O'Reily convinces Dr. Nathan to try to help them escape.
39	15	"Even the Score"	J. Miller Tobin	Tom Fontana & Sunil Nayar & Sean Whitesell	February 18, 2001	3.72	Sports
McManus' attempts to help Omar White seem hopeless but he insists that he will not give up on him. Beecher talks with the parents of Kathy Rockwell about understanding how they feel and why he is being paroled. Hughes accepts his fate and asks to be executed for murdering Basil but Glynn refuses. Said continues to struggle with his demons but cannot find any comfort having assaulted Robson. Schillinger learns that his daughter-in-law, Carrie, was a prostitute and his granddaughter may not be his granddaughter at all. The COs give McManus and Brass an advantage in the next basketball game. A scout believes Brass has what it takes to play pro ball but Morales cuts Brass' dreams out. Supreme Allah and Tug Daniels work together to take over the drug trade but Daniels is tried in Redding's court and the result is Daniels' life. Devlin decides to suspend the death sentence of William Giles and suspends the death penalty until it is not deemed cruel and unusual. Cloutier exiles Kirk for using physical force on those who do not wish to convert. O'Reily finally gets the upper hand on Howell and works with Connelly on what he thinks is the good for Ireland. Ratings: 3.722 million viewers
40	16	"Famous Last Words"	Adam Bernstein	Tom Fontana & Sean Whitesell	February 25, 2001	4.16	Last words
In trying to get back at Supreme Allah and save Redding, Hill concocts a plan to rid Oz of Supreme Allah. Morales survives a hit on him. Cloutier is forced to resign as minister and loses the support of his followers. To try to gain their respect, he offers to help them in their work but ends up bricked behind a wall. Hughes tries to rally the inmates in Solitary to rise up but an attempt to kill Glynn costs Hughes his life. McManus and Murphy lose the final game to Vayhue and Busmalis and after failing to help White, he starts to wonder if he and Glynn are both capable of running Oz. Schillinger learns of Beecher's parole and vows to stop him from going free, while Beecher dreams of what it would feel like to be free. With his parole denied and Schillinger happy about it, Said feels the spirit of Adebisi and takes down Schillinger and Robson. Connelly's plan of blowing up Em City is almost in effect until O'Reily has a change of heart. The bomb turns out to be a dud but Oz is rocked by an unrelated explosion.

=== Season 5 (2002) ===
No. overall	No. in season	Title	Directed by	Written by	Original release date	US viewers (millions)	Theme
41	1	"Visitation"	Alex Zakrzewski	Tom Fontana	January 6, 2002	4.17	Historical figures and prison
Oz re-opens after the renovations. Complications leave the Solitary inmates in Gen Pop for a while. Ryan does what he does best, complicating the investigation into Keenan's murder. He has Martin Montgomery (notable for being played by Kiss drummer Peter Criss) claim that he saw Henry Stanton (whom Cyril befriended in protective custody) murder Keenan. Beecher, Said and Schillinger agree to interaction sessions. A busload of visitors to Oz skids off the road and many are killed before seeing their loved ones.
42	2	"Laws of Gravity"	Rob Morrow	Tom Fontana & Sean Whitesell	January 13, 2002	3.45	The Three Laws
Rebadow gives Alvarez some advice on what it would take to earn respect. Rebadow's grandson is dying, in desperate need of a bone marrow donor, but while doing research Rebadow discovers that there may be a way to save him. Suzanne Fitzgerald begins community service teaching music in Oz. Montgomery threatens to expose Ryan's deceit, but Ryan schemes his way out, free of Montgomery. Devlin sets up a state liaison where his assistant, Elanor O'Conner will be handling complaints; it turns out that she is McManus' ex wife. McManus gives Said a new project: Omar. The hit man who killed Hank Schillinger gives up Pancamo and Schillinger takes revenge. The Reverend Cloutier continues to influence his followers from his infirmary bed.
43	3	"Dream a Little Dream of Me"	Adam Bernstein	Tom Fontana & Sean Whitesell	January 20, 2002	3.38	Dreams
After Alvarez has himself stabbed, one of the inmates sees him as a guiding light but Alvarez gives him the task of killing Guerra. Brass tries to find out who cut his tendon, suspecting Morales is involved. Jia Kenmin returns and will not retaliate against the O'Reilys. Redding and Morales forge an uneasy defensive alliance, which sees the Sicilians get replaced quickly when Schibetta tries to get revenge on Schillinger only to be raped again. Keller returns to find out that the FBI knows he is responsible for a murder he committed years ago; the Cloutier mystery deepens after Hoyt tries to kill Kirk and confesses to all the crimes he committed.
44	4	"Next Stop, Valhalla"	J. Miller Tobin	Tom Fontana & Sunil Nayar	January 27, 2002	3.80	Norse mythology
Velez fails in his attempt to kill Guerra. A class to train guide dogs for the blind is arranged and Alvarez, Hill and Penders register. Miss Sally's Schoolyard is cancelled and replaced with Sallycize. Schillinger threatens Schibetta. Beecher sponsors a family friend, Adam Gunzel, who is in prison for raping a girl, while his friend, Franklin Winthrop, winds up being Schillinger's new prag. The O'Reily brothers band together to protect Suzanne Fitzgerald when Cyril murders Li Chen and gets sent to Solitary. Gloria attacks Martinez when he gropes her while she is treating him in solitary. The Aryans attack Lalar. Augustus Hill cannot stop thinking about his mother's death.
45	5	"Wheel of Fortune"	Terry Kinney	Tom Fontana & Sunil Nayar	February 3, 2002	2.61	Psychics
Said and Arif go to Warden Glynn about Lalar's murder. Angry and full of rage, Said then confronts White about passing drugs. Unsatisfied with White's response, Said beats White severely, which gets Said thrown in the hole. Robson stirs up trouble. Pancamo develops a staph infection. On orders from Schillinger, Winthrop gets into a fight with Guenzel. Schillinger goes to Beecher to win favor, only he intends to have Beecher turn Guenzel over to him to be his "slave". Guenzel does not want to be seen with Beecher. Keller discovers the feds have compelling evidence linking him to one of the past murders. Meanwhile, Howell makes her move on Keller. Officer Brass makes off with Rebadow's winning $2 million lottery ticket; Rebadow's ship comes in, for someone else. Hill becomes gravely ill. Redding vows to find out who got Hill back on drugs. Morales deals with his sister's death by beating his brother-in-law bloody in the visiting room and is thrown in the hole. Kirk is transferred back to Oz from Benchley Memorial and begs Father Ray to let him return to the church as Hoyt is transferred to death row. O'Reily tries to cover Cyril's legal fees and holds a family meeting. McClain recommends that O'Reily hire a big-name lawyer for Cyril.
46	6	"Variety"	Roger Rees	Tom Fontana & Bradford Winters	February 10, 2002	3.89	Variety show
The inmate variety show takes shape with Father Mukada as MC and White the featured performer and with Omar White as the finale. Said returns from the hole ready to apologize to White, and the two turn over a new leaf in their relationship. Robson's painful teeth force him to the dentist, something he secretly fears. The dentist recommends gum replacement surgery. Alvarez wants to give his dog to Eugene Rivera (the Oz guard he blinded). Cyril's trial looms and gets off to an inauspiciously cold start. Ryan is worried and cuts a deal that gets Shupe disabled. Redding continues to search for the culprit who gave drugs to Hill. Poet, in an attempt to hide the truth from Redding convinces Busmalis to tell Redding that one of the Italians did the deed. This results in Redding having DeSantos poisoned. Chucky's condition worsens and out of fear he summons Sister Pete for spiritual help. Dr. Nathan counsels Peter Schibetta. Sister Pete starts looking for Schibetta's attackers only the three who know (Said, Beecher, Schillinger) refuse to divulge. Tensions between Mukada and Kirk come to a boil when Mukada convinces Hoyt to inform. In exchange for fellatio, Timmy Kirk has Clarence get someone to burn down Father Mukada's church and rectory. He is seriously injured, and two other priests die. Beecher and Keller anger McClain, who walks out. Howell gives Keller a free trip to Benchley Memorial. Beecher accepts Schillinger's deal: he takes the mail job and Adam is transferred to Unit B.
47	7	"Good Intentions"	Adam Bernstein	Tom Fontana & Bradford Winters	February 17, 2002	3.65	Good intentions gone bad
Hill returns from Benchley Memorial but refuses to tell McManus who gave him the drugs. Cyril is found guilty and Ryan informs Catherine and Sister Pete that he will not ask for clemency. He tells Cyril that he is going to be set free. Behind Ryan's back, Sister Pete, Suzanne, Catherine, and Father Meehan begin working on a press blitz to ensure the public will not let Cyril be executed. Ryan repays the Latinos for amputating Shupe's right arm by provoking Jia into a fight. When Officer Lopresti bullies Penders, Penders tells his dog to attack. Well-trained, the dog rips into Lopresti's throat. Penders is sent to solitary, leaving Miguel as the last of the three dog-trainers. Feeling guilty for his part in Brass' downslide and stealing of the lottery ticket, Tim helps Bob Rebadow track down a match for his grandson's transplant, when this fails, he finds another way, faith healing, only to be shunned by his family. Keller caught the same bus that took Hill back to Oz, only Keller has permanent hearing loss in his right ear. Sister Pete tries in vain to help him. Meanwhile, a guilt-ridden Beecher admits his behavior to Said, who tells him he has to punish himself by not seeing Keller if he truly wants to atone. Beecher agrees. Vern then arranges for Adam to "escape", which leads to Adam being electrocuted on the barb-wire fence at the gates. Beecher is, as always, guilt-ridden.
48	8	"Impotence"	Alex Zakrzewski	Tom Fontana	February 24, 2002	3.59	Erectile dysfunction
Robson deals with his rejection by the Brotherhood by slicing his gums away with a razor blade. McManus arranges a parole hearing for Miguel. Glynn is outraged and tells the board of Miguel's many misdeeds. Miguel tries but reaches his limit with a hateful inquisitor and beats him bloody, causing his 50th trip back to solitary. Gloria's guilt over Pancamo grows as he lapses into a coma. McManus tries to comfort her, telling her even doing one good thing, as he has with Omar, makes up for all the mistakes. Omar threatens Cutler in the storage closet, which leads to a fight and Omar nearly killing him. A betrayed, furious McManus sends Omar back to solitary. Beecher's guilt leads him to come forward with news of Vern raping Winthrop and Guenzel, sending Vern to solitary with the help of corroborating witnesses and evidence. Beecher then defies Said and returns to Keller's arms (through cell bars). Keller is found guilty of murder and sentenced to death. Rebadow leaves Oz for the first time in over 35 years to visit his near-death grandson. Cyril is moved to death row and beats on several guards (with Keller's encouragement) when he realizes he is going to die. He is somewhat comforted when Sister Pete brings his sock puppet. Father Meehan finds out Ryan O'Reily has a dark secret that involves his infant sister who died many years ago. Morales convinces default-Sicilian leader Urbano to kill Redding. Urbano crosses his path, preparing to stab him, but Hill wheels in front of his father figure, the blade cutting into him.

=== Season 6 (2003) ===
No. overall	No. in season	Title	Directed by	Written by	Original release date	U.S. viewers (millions)	Theme
49	1	"Dead Man Talking"	Adam Bernstein	Tom Fontana	January 5, 2003	3.86	Death and the afterlife
Augustus wrote memoirs before he died, and McManus gives them to Said and a regretful Redding. Suzanne proposes a production of Macbeth instead of a talent show; Meehan gets the role before dying of natural causes. The Mayor goes on trial for a racially motivated double murder and racial tensions rise. Alvarez and Guerra try to make peace after Alvarez is released from solitary due to overcrowding, on condition of ongoing good behaviour. Schillinger and Stanton are released from solitary. Timmy Kirk is sent to death row while Mukada returns to work, Kirk feels he is possessed by Satan and wants his help, but rejects him, the Vicar general arrives saying that he molested Kirk and as a result, is suspended. Winthrop gets out of being a prag and into the brotherhood by killing Beecher's father.
50	2	"See No Evil, Hear No Evil, Smell No Evil"	Marc Klasfeld	Tom Fontana & Sunil Nayar	January 12, 2003	2.64	Senses
Beecher finally gets parole. The reconstruction ends up making the inmates in solitary sick. Telemarketing arrives in Oz; Burr sees it as the perfect alternative to drug dealing and enlists the homeboys. A magazine shoot results in Hoyt killing Kirk and Mukada is reinstated, claiming his prayers have been answered. Alvarez tries to make contact with his old girlfriend Maritza. Schibetta tries to curse the O'Reilys, but Ryan has powers of his own. Pancamo tries to get revenge on Robson for almost killing him, and he goes to Cutler for protection, but has to pay a hefty price for it.
51	3	"Sonata da Oz"	Judy Dennis	Tom Fontana & Sunil Nayar	January 19, 2003	2.51	Music
Beecher leaves Oz. An unknown person has the Mayor assassinated. Cyril begins electro-convulsive therapy to combat severe depression and schizophrenia. Glynn meets the press about the solitary poisonings while Brass gets revenge on Morales. Said attempts to start a bookbinding business and meets with a reporter with a surprise up his sleeve.
52	4	"A Failure to Communicate"	David Von Ancken	Tom Fontana & Bradford Winters	January 26, 2003	3.09	Communication
Ryan despairs about Cyril's unsuccessful appeal as a friend from Suzanne's radical days arrives in Oz. Beecher returns to Oz as a visitor and gets Keller off Death Row. Arif reluctantly takes control of the Muslims and the bookbinding business as Burr has troubles of his own keeping the homeboys in telemarketing. Martinez did not die of poisoning, he was murdered. Penders threatens to sue about the conditions in solitary and Omar agrees not to, in exchange for a ticket back to Em City. Robson thinks up a way to get out of being Cutler's "prag".
53	5	"4giveness"	John Henry Davis	Tom Fontana & Bradford Winters	February 2, 2003	3.20	Forgiveness
Cyril's execution date approaches, while Hoyt is ruled insane and is prepped to be sent to the institution. The Muslims struggle to cope without Said and to run his bookbinding business. Alvarez is bewildered to discover Cutler left him all his possessions. Robson rejoins the Brotherhood. Glynn investigates the murder of the Mayor. Busmalis visits Norma and the baby and they get engaged again. Keller betrays Beecher to bring him back to Oz.
54	6	"A Day in the Death..."	Daniel Loflin	Tom Fontana & Sunil Nayar & Bradford Winters	February 9, 2003	3.68	Causes of death
Keller is rejected by Beecher and strikes up an alliance with Schillinger. Idzik is transferred to Em City, where he has an unusual request for Omar. Glynn gets closer to who murdered Mayor Loewen as the feds seem to lose interest. One of the infirmary staff has a suspicious record of deaths. Cutler's widow visits Alvarez again. Redding has a plan to get the homeboys out of bookbinding and back under his control. The date of Cyril's execution is set.
55	7	"Junkyard Dawgs"	Theodore Bogosian	Tom Fontana & Chuck Schweitzer	February 16, 2003	3.27	Junk
Two new drug peddlers arrive in Oz and try to scrape out a market between the Sicilians and the homeboys, with two different results. Keller pledges loyalty to both Beecher and Schillinger, with a kiss for each. McManus has one last chance to save Omar. Ryan keeps faith as Cyril's execution nears. Alvarez tries to right wrongs and keep in the straight life. Glynn continues digging into the web of the Mayor's murder, but his investigation will come to an end, one way or another.
56	8	"Exeunt Omnes"	Alex Zakrzewski	Tom Fontana	February 23, 2003	3.71	True facts
Devlin is accused of being involved in the deaths of Mayor Lowen and Glynn, among others. Prior to the pending investigation, he fires McManus from Em City. Querns replaces Glynn as warden and of course plans to make waves. Brass goes completely crazy and tries to kill Jackson Vayhue (now paroled and playing ball again) after Vayhue snubs him. He is arrested and sent away. Father Mukada learns that Hoyt's rich parents adopted him at birth. Mukada tracks down his mother and they share a loving, tender reunion. As he is also cut off from Cutler's wife, Miguel slips into the seductive arms and drugs of his cellmate, Torquemada. Rebadow and Stella reunite. Pablo stabs another inmate and goes to the Hole (where the prisoner is now stripped naked and held in a restraining chair). Vern is stabbed in the stomach by Beecher. Although Gloria tries to comfort him as best she can, Ryan is barely able to cope without Cyril in his life. Ryan forgives his father for past sins, and they decide to start over. Keller jumps from the balcony in Em City, killing himself, but making it seem as if Beecher had pushed him, thereby falsely implicating him. Before, Keller told Beecher that he had taken care of the Aryans, and those cryptic words come true when a mysterious package arrives at the post office. The contents are a poisonous powder which kills all the Aryans immediately. In Oz's final moments, each section of the prison is evacuated, McManus is heard saying "The move is temporary, we will be back someday," and every last character gets on a bus; while back in Oz the echoes of the past years linger in the empty cells and recreation rooms, implying they never came back and Oz is still a ghost town.

Bonus Episode: Zo: On May 1, 2024, the 16-minute short film Zo was released on YouTube (https://www.youtube.com/watch?v=Xu_yujhtkpI). Set over 20 years after the series' end, it portrays a tense phone conversation between Tobias Beecher and Ryan O'Reily, both now out of prison for different reasons. The film stars Lee Tergesen and Dean Winters (reprising their roles from the series) and was written by longtime Oz showrunner Tom Fontana
