= Detours (film) =

- Promotional Film Poster by David Spagnolo
- Directed by: Robert McCaskill
- Written by: Mara Lesemann
- Produced by: Carlo Fiorletta; Mara Lesemann; Tara Westwood
- Starring: Tara Westwood; Carlo Fiorletta; Paul Sorvino; Richard Kind; Michael Cerveris; Phyllis Somerville; Kim Director
- Cinematography: Christopher Eadicicco
- Music by: Andre Fratto
- Production company: About Us Productions
- Release date: April 30, 2016 (Sunscreen Film Festival)
- Running time: 81 minutes
- Country: United States
- Language: English

Detours is a 2016 road-trip comedy about a newly single New Yorker who must relocate to Florida for a new job; she travels south with her widowed father and her mother's ashes in a coffee can. Detours was directed by Robert McCaskill from a script by Mara Lesemann (additionally known for Surviving Family). The movie starred Tara Westwood and Carlo Fiorletta; the supporting cast included Richard Kind, Michael Cerveris, Phyllis Somerville, Kim Director, and Paul Sorvino. Cerveris also contributed several original songs to the soundtrack.

Detours premiered at the Sunscreen Film Festival on April 30, 2016, and was released on Amazon Prime on November 25, 2016.

== Plot ==
Detours is the story of a father and daughter who are both starting over, one after the death of a spouse and the other after a divorce.

When Jennifer Giraldi (Tara Westwood) visits her father (Carlo Fiorletta) to announce she is relocating to start a new career, she realizes her father has not left the house since the death of his wife (Kim Director), except for bare necessities, and he has yet to dispose of her mother's ashes. Jennifer realizes she has lost touch with her dad despite being geographically close. She convinces Dan to tackle the relocation with her and her automated friend, Joe, her GPS with above-average artificial intelligence.

== Cast ==
- Tara Westwood as Jennifer Giraldi
- Carlo Fiorletta as Dan Giraldi
- Paul Sorvino as Joe DiMaria
- Richard Kind as Sam Jacobson
- Michael Cerveris as Bob O’Connor
- Kim Director as Grace Giraldi
- Phyllis Somerville as Annie Delaney
- Deirdre O’Connell as Beth
- Vanessa Aspillaga as Megan O’Malley
- Michael Pressman as Tom McKinnon

== Production ==
Detours was shot over 20 days in September and October 2014. Interiors were shot in New Jersey and New York City. Exteriors were shot in New Jersey; North Carolina; Myrtle Beach, South Carolina; Savannah, Georgia; and Saint Petersburg, Florida.

=== Soundtrack ===
The score for Detours was created by Andre Fratto, and featured several original songs.

No.	Title	Writer(s)	Artist(s)	Length
1.	"Down the Road" (Theme Song)	Lane Turner	Lane Turner	4:31
2.	"Disconnect"	Michael Cerveris	Michael Cerveris	6:47
3.	"Crosshill"	Michael Cerveris	Michael Cerveris	3:48
4.	"SPCA"	Michael Cerveris and Corin Tucker	Michael Cerveris and Corin Tucker	4:47
5.	"Just My Love"	Katherine C. Hughes and Craig Wilson	Katherine C. Hughes	2:59
6.	"Carry On"	Deena Miller	Deena Miller	4:39
7.	"Back to You"	Jon Alan Lee	Jon Alan Lee	1:43
8.	"Almost Beautiful"	Kurt Krezanski and Jimmy Thow	Kurt Krezanski	3:58
9.	"Bach Sarabande in B Minor, BWV 1002"	Johann Sebastian Bach	David Patterson	2:55
10.	"Over That Bridge"	Britt Neal	Britt Neal	3:40
11.	"I Do"	Abby Payne	Abby Payne	2:59

== Release ==
Detours premiered at the Sunscreen Film Festival in Saint Petersburg, Florida, on April 30, 2016. It subsequently screened at the Golden Door Film Festival in Jersey City, New Jersey. Detours received positive reviews from critics: Florida feature editor Jennifer Heit praised the film, saying, “With much candor and a touch of whimsy, Detours explores the issues all of us grapple with - grief, rejection, insecurity - while showing how even just a kernel of hope helps manage life's inevitable messiness.” Richard Propes of The Independent Critic gave the film three stars, calling it “the kind of film that proves to be popular on the indie fest circuit by telling a story so seldom seen in the multiplexes these days.”

=== Home media ===
Detours was released on Amazon Prime on November 25, 2016. TubiTV was added in March 2020 and Plex in May 2021.

== Awards and nominations ==
Year	Award	Category	Nominees	Result
2016	Action on Film International Film Festival	Best Picture	Detours	Won
2016	Golden Door International Film Festival of Jersey City	Best Actress in a Feature Film	Tara Westwood	Won
2016	Golden Door International Film Festival of Jersey City	Best Supporting Actor	Richard Kind	Won
2016	Golden Door International Film Festival of Jersey City	Best Actor in a Feature Film	Carlo Fiorletta	Nominated
2016	Long Island International Film Expo	Best Feature Film	Detours	Nominated
