= List of awards and nominations received by Oz =

Oz awards and nominations
Awards and nominations
Award	Wins	Nominations
Primetime Emmy Awards	0	2
ALMA Awards	4	16
Artios Awards	3	6
CableACE Awards	3	7
Il Festival Nazionale del Doppiaggio Voci nell'Ombra	1	1
Edgar Awards	1	1
GLAAD Media Awards	0	1
NAACP Image Awards	0	7
PGA Television Awards	0	1
Satellite Awards	2	5
Writers Guild of America Awards	0	1

Totals (Note: Certain award groups do not simply award one winner. They acknowledge several different recipients, have runners-up, and have third place. Since this is a specific recognition and is different from losing an award, runner-up mentions are considered wins in this award tally. For simplification and to avoid errors, each award in this list has been presumed to have had a prior nomination.)
- Wins: 14
- Nominations: 48

Oz is an American drama television series which was produced and broadcast by premium cable network HBO from 1997 to 2003. The series has been successful with many award associations, in particular, the American Latino Media Arts Awards (known as the ALMA Awards), the Casting Society of America's Artios Awards, the CableACE Awards, the Online Film & Television Association Awards and the International Press Academy's Satellite Awards. It has never been the recipient of any major awards, however, it has been nominated two Primetime Emmy Awards for Outstanding Guest Actor in a Drama Series and Outstanding Casting for a Series, as well as garnering several nominations at the NAACP Image Awards.

Rita Moreno is the most nominated actress of the series, with a total of four wins out of twelve nominations. Other successful recipients include Lauren Vélez, Ernie Hudson, Eamonn Walker and Christopher Meloni.

== Primetime Emmy Awards ==
Year	Category	Nominee(s)	Result	Ref(s)
1999	Outstanding Guest Actor in a Drama Series	Charles S. Dutton	Nominated	
1999	Outstanding Casting for a Series	Alexa L. Fogel	Nominated	

== ALMA Awards ==
Year	Category	Nominee(s)	Result	Ref(s)
1998	Outstanding Actor in a Drama Series	Kirk Acevedo	Nominated	
1998	Outstanding Actress in a Drama Series	Rita Moreno	Won	
1999	Outstanding Actor in a Drama Series	Kirk Acevedo	Nominated	
1999	Outstanding Actress in a Drama Series	Lauren Vélez	Nominated	
1999	Outstanding Actress in a Drama Series	Rita Moreno	Won	
1999	Outstanding Drama Series	Oz	Nominated	
2000	Outstanding Actor in a Drama Series	Kirk Acevedo	Nominated	
2000	Outstanding Actress in a Drama Series	Lauren Vélez	Nominated	
2000	Outstanding Actress in a Drama Series	Rita Moreno	Nominated	
2001	Outstanding Actor in a Drama Series	Kirk Acevedo	Nominated	
2001	Outstanding Actress in a Drama Series	Lauren Vélez	Won	
2001	Outstanding Actress in a Drama Series	Rita Moreno	Nominated	
2001	Outstanding Television Series	Oz	Nominated	
2002	Outstanding Actress in a Drama Series	Lauren Vélez	Nominated	
2002	Outstanding Actress in a Drama Series	Rita Moreno	Won	
2002	Outstanding Television Series	Oz	Nominated	

== Artios Awards ==
The Artios Awards are presented by the Casting Society of America.

Year	Category	Nominee(s)	Result	Ref(s)
1998	Dramatic Pilot Casting	Alexa L. Fogel	Won	
1998	Dramatic Episodic Casting	Alexa L. Fogel	Won	
1999	Dramatic Episodic Casting	Alexa L. Fogel	Won	
2000	Dramatic Episodic Casting	Alexa L. Fogel	Nominated	
2001	Dramatic Episodic Casting	Alexa L. Fogel	Nominated	
2002	Dramatic Episodic Casting	Alexa L. Fogel	Nominated	

== CableACE Awards ==
Year	Category	Nominee(s)	Result	Ref(s)
1997	Actor in a Dramatic Special or Series	Eamonn Walker	Won	
1997	Actor in a Dramatic Special or Series	Kirk Acevedo	Nominated	
1997	Actor in a Dramatic Special or Series	Terry Kinney	Nominated	
1997	Actress in a Dramatic Special or Series	Rita Moreno	Won	
1997	Directing a Dramatic Special or Series (Note: Episode: "Visits, Conjugal and Otherwise".)	Nick Gomez	Nominated	
1997	Writing a Dramatic Special or Series (Note: Episode: "Straight Life".)	Tom Fontana	Nominated	
1997	Dramatic Series	Oz	Won	

== Il Festival Nazionale del Doppiaggio Voci nell'Ombra ==
Year	Category	Nominee(s)	Result	Ref(s)
2001	Special Jury Prize	Giovanni Giacomo Galassi	Won	

== Edgar Awards ==
The Edgar Awards are presented by the Mystery Writers of America.

Year	Category	Nominee(s)	Result	Ref(s)
2005	Special Edgar Award (Note: Tied with Homicide: Life on the Street (NBC) & The Jury (Fox).)	Tom Fontana	Won	

== GLAAD Media Awards ==
Year	Category	Nominee(s)	Result	Ref(s)
2000	Outstanding Drama Series	Oz	Nominated	

== NAACP Image Awards ==
Year	Category	Nominee(s)	Result	Ref(s)
1999	Outstanding Lead Actress in a Drama Series	Rita Moreno	Nominated	
1999	Outstanding Supporting Actor in a Drama Series	Charles S. Dutton	Nominated	
2000	Outstanding Actress in a Drama Series	Rita Moreno	Nominated	
2000	Outstanding Actor in a Drama Series	Adewale Akinnuoye-Agbaje	Nominated	
2000	Outstanding Drama Series	Oz	Nominated	
2001	Outstanding Supporting Actor in a Drama Series	Adewale Akinnuoye-Agbaje	Nominated	
2003	Outstanding Supporting Actress in a Drama Series	Rita Moreno	Nominated	

== PGA Television Awards ==
The PGA Television Awards are presented by the Producers Guild of America.

Year	Category	Nominee(s)	Result	Ref(s)
2001	Best Episodic Drama	Oz	Nominated	

== Satellite Awards ==
The Satellite Awards are presented by the International Press Academy.

Year	Category	Nominee(s)	Result	Ref(s)
1999	Best Actor – Television Series Drama	Ernie Hudson	Won	
1999	Best Actress – Television Series Drama	Rita Moreno	Nominated	
1999	Best Television Series – Drama	Oz	Won	
2000	Best Actor – Television Series Drama	Eamonn Walker	Nominated	
2000	Best Television Series – Drama	Oz	Nominated	

== Writers Guild of America Awards ==
The Writers Guild of America Awards are presented by Writers Guild of America, East.

Year	Category	Nominee(s)	Result	Ref(s)
2000	Best Episodic Drama (Note: Episode: "U.S. Male".)	Tom Fontana; Bradford Winters	Nominated	
