= My Dead Ex =

American teen comedy web series

- Genre: Teen comedy
- Created by: Jason Director; Ayla Harrison; Drew Hancock
- Starring: Katherine Hughes; Ryan Lee; Ryan Malaty
- Country of origin: United States
- Original language: English
- No. of seasons: 1
- No. of episodes: 8

Production
- Executive producers: Brett Bouttier; Joe Davola; Don Dunn; Drew Hancock; Matthew Kaplan; Jordan Levin
- Production locations: Canada; Ohio
- Editor: Jason Miller
- Running time: 60 minutes
- Production company: AwesomenessTV

Original release
- Network: go90
- Release: March 20, 2018

My Dead Ex is an American web series which was produced by AwesomenessTV and aired on go90. The series premiered at South by Southwest in 2018 before being aired on go90 starting on March 20. The show currently added on Paramount+.

== Plot ==
Charley is a normal high school girl with a crush on a cute boy. As she tries to score a date with the cute boy named Luke, her annoying ex, Ben Bloom, will do anything to get her to go on a date with him. Ever since she dumped him, she wanted nothing to do with him, but when he dies, things start to change.

== Cast ==
- Katherine Hughes as Charley
- Ryan Lee as Ben
- Medalion Rahimi as Wren
- Ryan Malaty as Luke
- Marc Evan Jackson as Vice Principal Kelly
- Beth Littleford as Laurel
- Audrey Wasilewski as Mary Bloom
- Matt Braunger as Officer Mitch Maloof

== Episodes ==
No.	Title	Directed by	Written by	Original release date
1	"That Nervous Jittery Feeling"	Chris Nelson	Drew Hancock, Jason Director & Ayla Harrison	March 20, 2018
2	"Ace of Hearts"	Chris Nelson	Drew Hancock	March 20, 2018
3	"¿Quién Diablos es Ben Bloom?"	Joe Lynch	Drew Hancock	March 20, 2018
4	"Swivel and Smile"	Joe Lynch	Drew Hancock	March 20, 2018
5	"The Z Word"	Zoe R. Cassavetes	Drew Hancock	March 20, 2018
6	"Someone Always Pukes Someone Always Cries"	Zoe R. Cassavetes	Drew Hancock	March 20, 2018
7	"Obligatory High School Dance Episode"	Chris Nelson	Drew Hancock	March 20, 2018
8	"You're The Parasitic Flatworm I Want To Be With"	Chris Nelson	Drew Hancock	March 20, 2018
