= Perfect Commando =

Finnish television series

- Also known as: Californian Commando
- Genre: Comedy
- Written by: Mikko Pöllä
- Directed by: Jalmari Helander
- Starring: Kian Lawley; Katherine Hughes; Johannes Holopainen; Wenla Reimaluoto
- Country of origin: Finland
- Original languages: English; Finnish
- No. of seasons: 1
- No. of episodes: 10

Production
- Production companies: Fire Monkey; Elisa Viihde (co-production)

Original release
- Network: Elisa Viihde
- Release: 13 February 2020 – present

Perfect Commando (also known as Californian Commando; Finnish: Kalifornian kommando) is a Finnish television comedy series that premiered on Elisa Viihde network on 13 February 2020. It is directed by Jalmari Helander and stars Kian Lawley and Katherine Hughes.

== Synopsis ==
Perfect Commando tells the story of Vantaa "Van" Hamilton (Lawley), who travels from California to his mother's homeland Finland with his girlfriend Rachel (Hughes), but their paths differ in Helsinki Airport due to a system error related to Van's background, and Van suddenly finds himself in the Finnish Defence Forces training as a commando into the middle of nowhere, while Rachel ends up living in Helsinki with Van's Finnish cousin who maintains a rap band with friends.

== Production ==
The series is partly spoken in English and partly in Finnish. The army scenes of the series are mainly filmed in the former garrison of Keuruu, Finland.
