= Ryan Malaty =

American actor and television personality

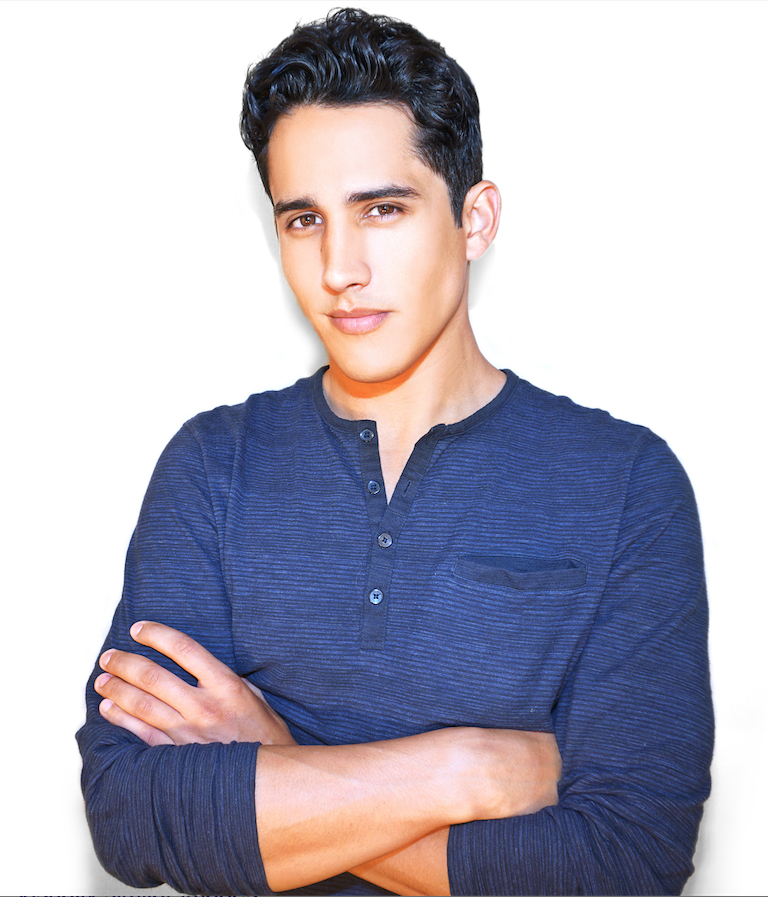
- Born: September 6, 1989 (age 37); New York City
- Occupations: Actor, Television Personality

Ryan Malaty (born September 6, 1989) is an Egyptian-American actor and television personality. Malaty stars on the Netflix feature film Reality High and the go90 series My Dead Ex. He is well known internationally for the MTV reality series Are You the One?, and has hosted the series AfterBuzz TV.

== Filmography ==
Year	Title	Role	Notes
2014	Are You the One?	Himself	
2016	Youthful Daze	Oliver Cardin	Web series, 78 episodes
2016	AfterBuzz TV	Himself	Host
2017	Reality High	Vinny	Netflix feature film
2018	My Dead Ex	Luke Sullivan	Series regular
2019	The Wedding Year	Ron	
2020	That One Time	Phil Agresta	Short film
2021	List of a Lifetime	Tobias	TV film
