= Kenny Wangler =

- First appearance: "God's Chillin" (episode 1.03)
- Last appearance: "A Cock and Balls Story" (episode 4.01)
- Portrayed by: J. D. Williams

In-universe information
- Nickname: Bricks

Kenny "Bricks" Wangler is a fictional character in the HBO drama series Oz, portrayed by J. D. Williams.

== Character overview ==
"Prisoner #97W566: Kenneth Wangler (16 years old and tried as an adult). Convicted July 6, 1997 - Murder in the first degree. Sentence: 20 years, up for parole in six."

Wangler was sent to prison for murdering a student he was attempting to rob. His constant macho bravado, disrespect for older prisoners, and drug addiction, among other things, make him particularly unsympathetic. He has an uneasy relationship with Homeboy gang leader Simon Adebisi throughout the series, which oscillates between loyal camaraderie and public antagonism. Adebisi routinely harasses his constant sidekick but freely shares the drugs.

=== Season 1 ===
Wangler is sent to Oz for murder and is immediately seen as a target. After he compliments Kareem Said by telling him he loved his book, Said tries to convert him to Islam, but his heroin addiction keeps him off the straight and narrow path. Adebisi suggests to current Homeboy leader Jefferson Keane to let him in so that the Homeboys can more easily wipe out the Italians. He helps Adebisi seriously injure Italian Joey D'Angelo in the kitchen and proves that he has a place in the gang. He later robs elderly inmate Bob Rebadow for no apparent reason, for which Unit Manager Tim McManus chokes him. Throughout the season up to the riot, Wangler remains a key drug dealer and a user who goes through severe withdrawal during the riot.

=== Season 2 ===
In general population, Wangler goes through severe heroin withdrawal and is assaulted by the guards. He is later let back into Em City, and McManus assigns him to a program dedicated to getting prisoners a GED. In the classroom, Wangler is disrespectful and verbally berates several inmates, particularly Poet, to deflect from his own illiteracy. Wangler's behavior improves due to his education, but Adebisi pulls him out of the class, and though McManus forces Wangler to stay, his behavior worsens once again. McManus punishes him by not allowing him to walk the stage at graduation. Wangler then gets back into the routine, even making peace with Poet and berates the Italian inmates after Adebisi takes out their most powerful members.

As Adebisi becomes increasingly unstable, it becomes clear that he cannot lead the Homeboys. The Italians offer Wangler a partnership if he kills Jara, the man responsible for salvaging Adebisi. In the kitchen where Jara is working, Wangler kills Jara by stabbing him several times in the back and then hands Junior Pierce, his main sidekick in the Homeboys, the murder knife to dispose it in a dishwasher. Wangler lies in his testimony that Adebisi committed the murder, successfully framing him.

=== Season 3 ===
Wangler befriends new inmate Malcolm Coyle, and defends him against Nappa, who despises the man. Adebisi is released from the psych ward and Wangler and Pierce begin plotting to kill him. Nappa, however, tells them to stand back for the time being. Wangler is upset when Coyle is kicked out of the kitchen on Nappa's suspicions. Wangler attempts to argue with Nappa on the issue, to which Nappa retorts "well then the two of you can cuddle in the privacy of your cell" amusing Chucky. Later Augustus Hill testifies against Coyle for murdering an Italian-American family, and Wangler seeks revenge. With the help of Kareem Said, Antonio Nappa, Carmen Guerra, and Vernon Schillinger, Hill is protected and Coyle is killed by the Italians.

Taking the new moniker of "Bricks", Wangler represents the Homeboys in the boxing tournament and falls quickly to heavier, fitter Muslim inmate Hamid Khan. Wangler, enraged by his loss, has Poet publicly humiliate Said for having sexual thoughts about a white woman. As a result, Said is kicked out of the Muslims, who do not like his association with Tricia Ross (sister of biker inmate Scott Ross) who is filing a lawsuit against the state for the death of her brother.

Later, Wangler's mother visits, telling him that his wife is cheating on him with a man he despises, who is also abusing his infant son. Wangler has them killed, while he attends his wife's funeral, Adebisi cuts a deal with Chucky Pancamo, who is now the head of the Italians, and with the help of the Latinos, burns Poet and Pierce severely. With Poet and Pierce hospitalised Adebisi then has himself arranged to become Wangler's cellmate, leaving Wangler at Adebisi's mercy. Adebisi has Wangler tied naked to his bed each night as a form of African war training and to reaffirm his dominance over Wangler. He then forces Wangler to accuse Tim McManus of sexual harassment. McManus credibility is severely hurt as he is already accused of sexual harassment by Claire Howell, McManus transfers Wangler to Unit B and Wangler accepts Adebisi's plan to get rid of McManus and have a black man run Em City. Poet and Pierce get out of the hospital wanting to kill Adebisi, but Wangler tells them to cool off for the time being. On New Year's Eve, amid the racial tension, Wangler, Poet, and Pierce lead the black inmates in a chant throughout Unit B to set Augustus Hill free from solitary.

=== Season 4 ===
Adebisi gets Wangler, Poet, and Pierce back into EM City against McManus' wishes. While inside, Adebisi is trying to find someone to use a gun in a specific manner so that McManus can be exposed as incompetent and unfit to run Em City. A new inmate, an insecure white man named Guillaume Tarrant, arrives in Oz and is an immediate target for Wangler, Poet, and Pierce; they steal his shoes and bully him regularly. Seeing this, Adebisi places the gun in his cell, and the next day Tarrant goes on a shooting spree after they antagonize him once again, gunning down Wangler, Pierce and a guard furthering racial tensions and wounding Keller in the process. Adebisi is able to focus on his other goals leaving his rivals dead and stoke further tensions in Oz.
