= Billy Magnussen =

American actor (born 1985)

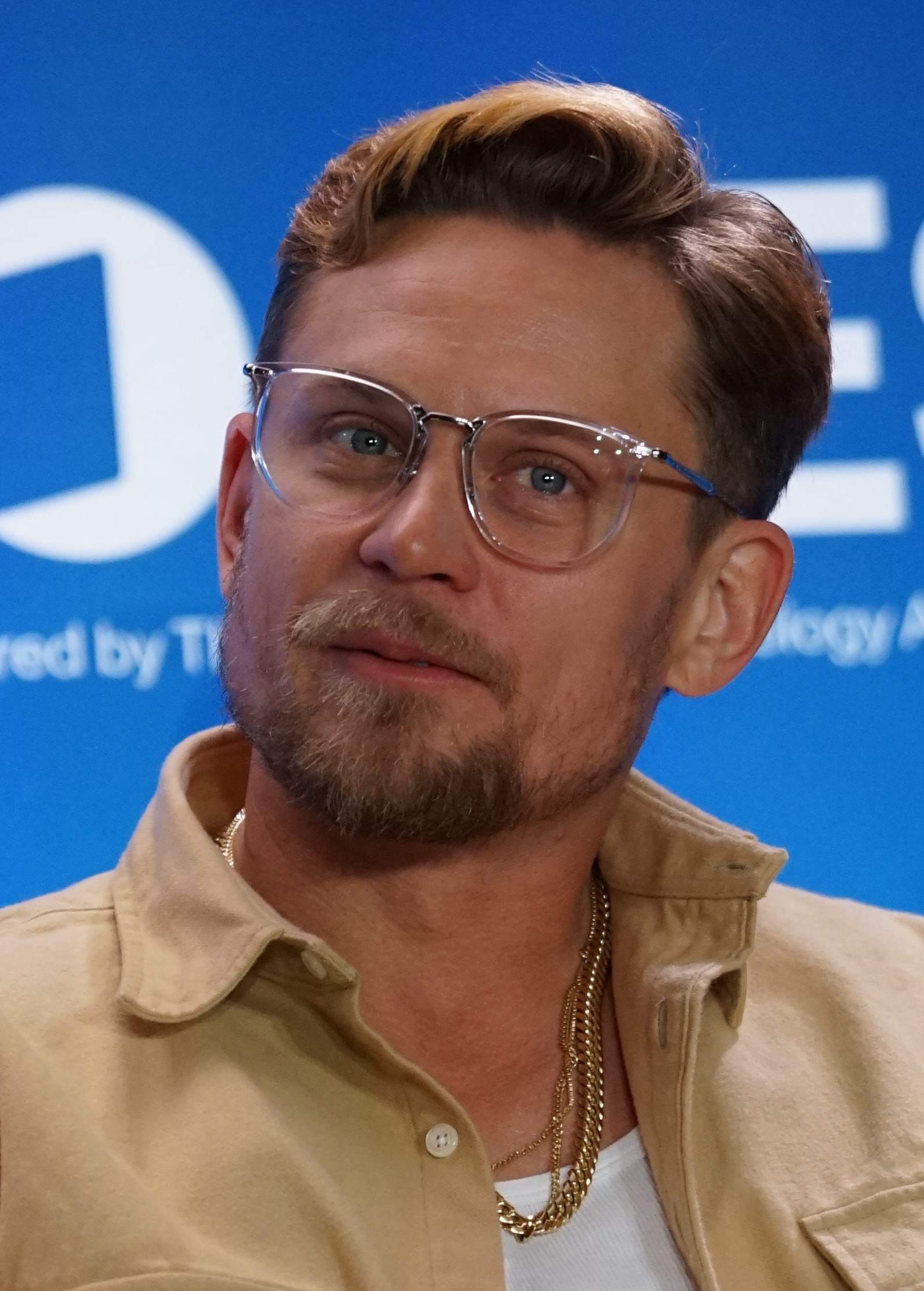
- Magnussen at CES 2026
- Born: William Gregory Magnussen; April 20, 1985 (age 41); New York City, U.S.
- Education: University of North Carolina School of the Arts (BFA)
- Occupation: Actor
- Years active: 2007–present

William Gregory "Billy" Magnussen (born April 20, 1985) is an American actor. He has been featured in the films Into the Woods (2014), Bridge of Spies (2015), Birth of the Dragon (2016), Game Night (2018), and Aladdin (2019), and has had supporting television roles in Get Shorty (2017) and Maniac (2018). In 2021, Magnussen starred in the sci-fi series Made for Love on HBO Max and appeared in the films The Many Saints of Newark and No Time to Die. He has since also starred as Rey "The King" Kingston in Spy Kids: Armageddon (2023) and as Pleakley in the live-action film adaptation of Lilo & Stitch (2025).

He has starred in Broadway and off-Broadway theater productions, including 2013's Vanya and Sonia and Masha and Spike, for which he received a nomination for the Tony Award for Best Featured Actor in a Play.

== Early life ==
Magnussen was born in Woodhaven, Queens, New York City, the son of Daina, an aerobics instructor, and Greg Magnussen, a professional bodybuilder and kickboxer. He has two younger brothers. He is of Norwegian and Lithuanian descent. He grew up in Queens around Woodhaven Boulevard until the age of 10, when he moved with his family to Cumming, Georgia. Magnussen graduated from South Forsyth High School in 2003, and later from the University of North Carolina School of the Arts.

== Acting career ==
=== Stage ===
Magnussen made his Broadway stage debut in 2007's The Ritz, starring Rosie Perez. In 2012, he was cast alongside David Hyde Pierce and Sigourney Weaver in Christopher Durang's Vanya and Sonia and Masha and Spike, premiering at the McCarter Theatre in Princeton, New Jersey, prior to its move to Lincoln Center in New York City. It then moved to the John Golden Theatre, where it was nominated for six Tony Awards. Magnussen was nominated for a Tony Award for Best Featured Actor in a Play for his role as Spike. In 2014, he starred on off-Broadway with Anna Gunn in a critically acclaimed production of Sex with Strangers directed by David Schwimmer at the Second Stage Theater.

=== Film ===
Magnussen appeared in the films Blood Night: The Legend of Mary Hatchet and Happy Tears, which stars Demi Moore and Parker Posey. He starred as Claude in the film Twelve, which was released July 30, 2010. He played Neil Thomas, a World War II hero, in the 2011 film The Lost Valentine, based on the book of the same name by James Michael Pratt, which aired on CBS on January 30, 2011. That same year, he also played Thor in Whit Stillman's Damsels in Distress. In 2012, he starred in the independent feature Surviving Family.

Magnussen starred in his breakout role as Rapunzel's Prince in Rob Marshall's 2014 film Into the Woods. In 2016, Magnussen appeared in The Great Gilly Hopkins, opposite Kathy Bates, as Ellis, the social worker in charge of Gilly Hopkins, played by Canadian actress Sophie Nélisse. The role was originally written for a female in the novel and stage play. In 2019, Magnussen played the newly created role of Prince Anders in Disney's live action adaptation of Aladdin, directed by Guy Ritchie. He returned to Disney in 2025, playing Pleakley in Lilo & Stitch.

In the 25th James Bond film No Time to Die (from Eon Productions), Magnussen plays CIA officer Logan Ash, who tries to convince a retired Bond to assist with a mission.

In 2025, he played the lead role in Violent Ends.

=== Television ===
Magnussen played Kato Kaelin on the first season of American Crime Story, about the murder trial of O. J. Simpson. He is known for his role on the CBS soap opera As the World Turns, where he took over the role of Casey Hughes on January 29, 2008. He guest-starred on The CW's series The Beautiful Life: TBL in 2009. He guest-starred on Boardwalk Empire as Roger McAlister, Gillian Darmody's (Gretchen Mol) ill-fated lover.

He also guest-starred on Law & Order: Criminal Intent, in the 10th-season episode "Icarus", and on Law & Order, in the 19th-season episode, "Sweetie". Magnussen appeared in four episodes of The Divide, guest-starred on NCIS: Los Angeles in episode 3 of season 2, titled "Borderline", and in episode 6 of the first season of The Leftovers. In 2017, Magnussen guest-starred as Russ Snyder on Unbreakable Kimmy Schmidt.

Magnussen also played a high school teacher Joshua "Nick" Sullivan who engages in a relationship with one of his students in Tell Me a Story during the first season, which came out in 2018.

== Music career ==
Magnussen once was the bass player and a contributing songwriter for the New York City-based rock band The Dash. He plays guitar in the New York City-based band Reserved for Rondee.

== Filmography ==
=== Film ===
Year	Title	Role	Notes
2009	Happy Tears	Ray	
2009	Blood Night: The Legend of Mary Hatchet	Eric	
2010	Twelve	Claude Kenton	
2011	Choose	Paul	
2011	Damsels in Distress	Thor	
2012	Surviving Family	Alex D'Amico	
2012	The Brass Teapot	Arnie	
2012	2nd Serve	Lingo	
2013	The East	Porty McCabe	
2014	Revenge of the Green Dragons	Detective Boyer	
2014	Into the Woods	Rapunzel's Prince	
2015	I Smile Back	Zach	
2015	The Meddler	Ben	
2015	Bridge of Spies	Doug Forrester	
2015	The Great Gilly Hopkins	Ellis	
2015	The Big Short	Mortgage broker	
2016	Birth of the Dragon	Steve McKee	
2017	Ingrid Goes West	Nicky Sloane	
2018	Game Night	Ryan Huddle	
2018	The Oath	Agent James Mason	
2019	Velvet Buzzsaw	Bryson	
2019	Aladdin	Prince Anders	
2021	The Survivor	Dietrich Schneider	
2021	The Many Saints of Newark	Paulie Gualtieri	
2021	No Time to Die	Logan Ash	
2022	Family Squares	Robert	
2023	Coup!	Jay "J.C." Horton	Also executive producer
2023	Spy Kids: Armageddon	Ray "The King" Kingston	
2024	Lift	Magnus	
2024	Road House	Ben Brandt	
2024	Reunion	Evan West	Also executive producer
2025	Lilo & Stitch	Agent Wendy Pleakley	Also voice
2025	A Big Bold Beautiful Journey	The Man	
2025	Violent Ends	Lucas Frost	
2026	The Social Reckoning	Teddy Marks	
2027	Buzzkill †	Sheriff Red	Post-production
2028	Lilo & Stitch 2 †	Agent Wendy Pleakley	Filming

=== Television ===
Year	Title	Role	Notes
2008	Law & Order	Cody Larson	Episode: "Sweetie"
2008–2010	As the World Turns	Casey Hughes	Contract role
2009	The Unusuals	Bo Keebler	Episode: "The Dentist"
2009	The Beautiful Life: TBL	Alex Marinelli	3 episodes
2010	NCIS: Los Angeles	Cpl Allen Reed	Episode: "Borderline"
2011	The Lost Valentine	Neil Thomas	Television film
2011	In Plain Sight	Jonathan Collins / Yonni Peterschwim	Episode: "Something A-mish"
2011	Law & Order: Criminal Intent	Marc Landry	Episode: "Icarus"
2012	Blue Bloods	Rand Hilbert	Episode: "Collateral Damage"
2012	CSI: Crime Scene Investigation	Det. Michael Crenshaw	2 episodes
2012	Boardwalk Empire	Roger McAllister	2 episodes
2013	Your Pretty Face Is Going to Hell	Spencer	Episode: "Schmickler83!"
2014	It Could Be Worse	Competition	Web series; episode: "Uncharted Territory"
2014	The Leftovers	Marcus	Episode: "Guest"
2014	The Divide	Eric Zale	4 episodes
2015	The Good Wife	Chris Fife	Episode: "Open Source"
2016	The People v. O. J. Simpson: American Crime Story	Kato Kaelin	3 episodes
2017	Unbreakable Kimmy Schmidt	Russ Snyder	2 episodes
2017	Friends from College	Sean	Episode: "All-Nighter"
2017	Get Shorty	Nathan Hill	Recurring role (season 1), 6 episodes
2017, 2025	Black Mirror	Karl Valdack	Episodes: "USS Callister", "USS Callister: Into Infinity"
2018	Maniac	Jed Milgrim / Grimsson	Miniseries, 7 episodes
2018–2019	Tell Me a Story	Joshua / Nick Sullivan	Main role (season 1)
2018–2020	The Bold Type	Billy Jeffries	2 episodes
2021–2022	Made for Love	Byron Gogol	Main role
2022	Woke	Denny "Dee Dee" Davis	Episode: "Black Exceptionalism"
2022	The Offer	Robert Redford	Episode: "A Seat at the Table"
2024	The Franchise	Adam Randolph	Main role
2025	Elsbeth	Rod Bedford	Episode: "I've Got a Little List"
2026	The Audacity	Duncan Park	Main role
2026	Tires	Taylor	3 episodes

=== Audio dramas ===
Year	Title	Role	Notes
2021	Unwanted	Grant	Scripted podcast
2023	Harley Quinn and The Joker: Sound Mind	The Joker	Scripted podcast

== Stage ==
Year	Title	Role	Notes
2007	The Ritz	Patron	Also understudy
2013	Vanya and Sonia and Masha and Spike	Spike	
2014	Sex With Strangers	Ethan	
2024	Shit. Meet. Fan.	Frank	

== Accolades ==
Award	Date of ceremony	Category	Work	Result	Ref(s)
Tony Awards	June 9, 2013	Best Featured Actor in a Play	Vanya and Sonia and Masha and Spike	Nominated	
San Diego Film Critics Society	December 10, 2018	Best Ensemble	Game Night	Won	
