= Blu Hunt =

American actress, from USA. (born 1995)

- Born: Blu Farias Hunt; July 11, 1995 (age 31); Placer County, California, U.S.
- Occupation: Actress
- Years active: 2015–present

Blu Farias Hunt (born July 11, 1995) is an American actress. She is best known for her roles as Inadu/The Hollow in The CW supernatural drama series The Originals (2017) and as August Catawnee in the Netflix science fiction drama series Another Life (2019–2021).

Hunt made her film debut as Danielle Moonstar / Mirage in the superhero film The New Mutants (2020), which is part of the X-Men film series.

== Early life ==
Blu Farias Hunt was born in Placer County, California to mother (née Andreotti) and father (Hunt), and grew up in a suburban environment. Her grandmother is part of the Oglala Lakota Nation and was from the Pine Ridge Reservation in South Dakota. Her great-grandfather was Apache. She studied at the American Academy of Dramatic Arts.

== Career ==
In 2017, Hunt received recognition for her recurring role as powerful Native American witch Inadu (The Hollow) Labonair in the fourth season of The CW supernatural drama series The Originals.

From 2019 to 2021, Hunt starred as August Catawnee, the lead engineer and youngest member of the crew aboard the spaceship Salvare, in the Netflix science fiction drama series Another Life. It was canceled after two seasons.

In 2019, Hunt guest starred in the ABC crime drama series Stumptown.

Hunt made her feature film debut as Danielle Moonstar / Mirage in the superhero horror film The New Mutants, which is part of the X-Men film series. The film was originally intended for release in April 2018, but suffered several delays. It was released on August 28, 2020.

Hunt stars as Amelia, the daughter of Sherlock Holmes in the CW series Sherlock & Daughter.

Hunt co-directed, co-wrote, produced, and stars in the feature film Replay from co-director Jason Lester.

== Personal life ==
Hunt has admitted that the best part of her leading role in The New Mutants, in which her character is of Native American descent and becomes romantically involved with another woman, was “knowing that I got to be queer and that I got to represent the Indigenous community.”

As of April 2025, Hunt is engaged to filmmaker Jason Lester.

== Filmography ==
=== Film ===
Year	Title	Role	Notes
2015	One Block Away	Erica	Short film
2020	The New Mutants	Danielle "Dani" Moonstar / Mirage	
2024	The Dead Thing	Alex	
2025	Lockjaw	Rayna	
2026	Replay	Viv Marie	Also writer and co-director

=== Television ===
Year	Title	Role	Notes
2016	Girl on Girl	Blu	Episode: "Assumptions"
2016	This Is It	Layla	Unaired pilot
2017	The Originals	The Hollow / Inadu Labonair	Recurring role (season 4)
2019–2021	Another Life	August Catawnee	Main cast (season 1), guest appearance (season 2)
2019	Stumptown	Nina Blackbird	Episode: "Forget It Dex, It's Stumptown."
2023	Grownish	Grace	3 episodes
2023	Lawmen: Bass Reeves	Calista	2 episodes
2025	Sherlock & Daughter	Amelia Rojas	Main cast
2026	The Faithful: Women of the Bible	Rachel	Episode: "The Women Who Loved."

Key
†	Denotes TV productions that have not yet been released

== Awards and nominations ==
Year	Work	Organizations	Category	Result
2024	The Dead Thing	Brooklyn Horror Film Festival	Best Performance	Won
