= Phyllis Somerville =

American actress (1943–2020)

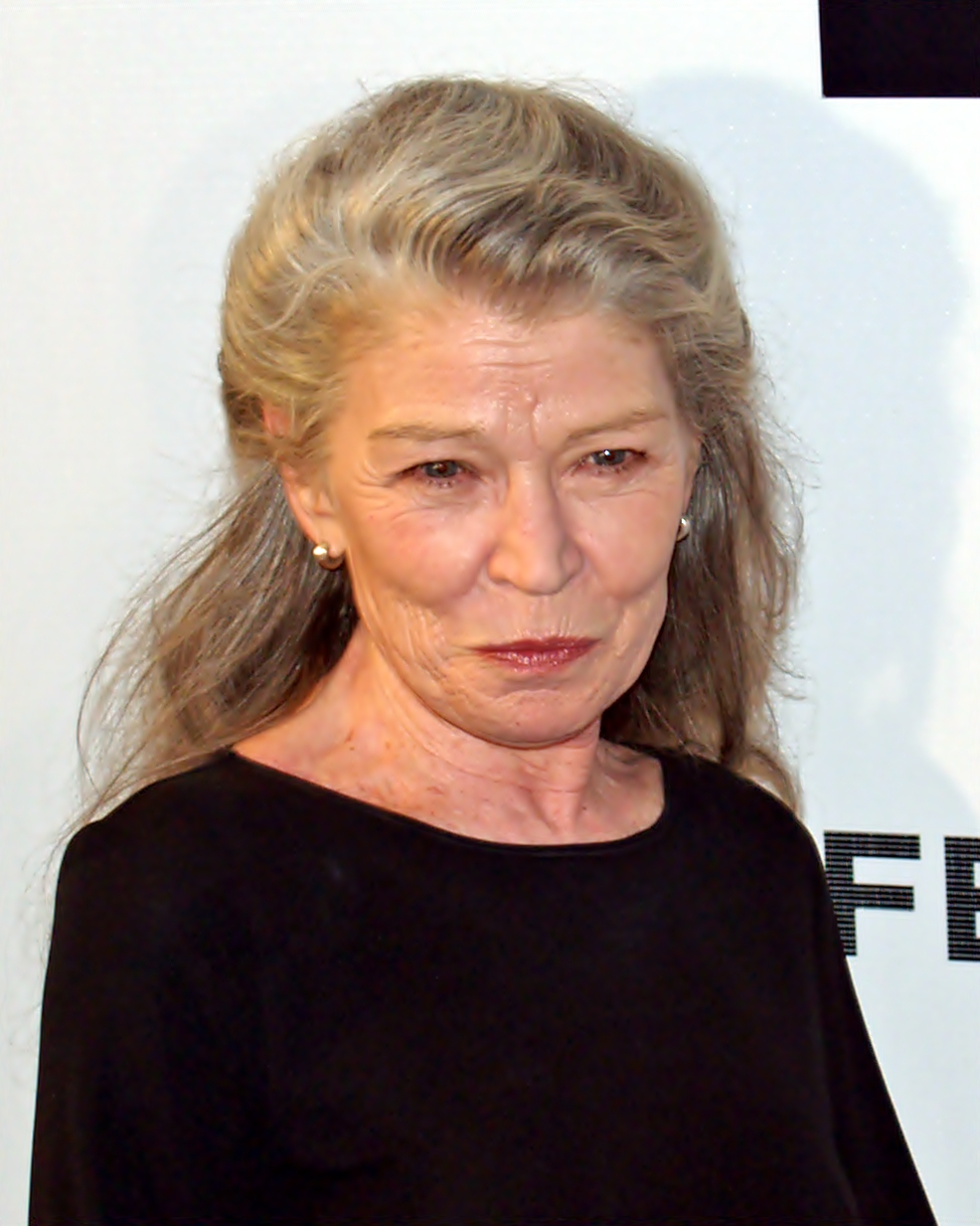
- Somerville at the 2007 Tribeca Film Festival
- Born: Phyllis Jeanne Somerville; December 12, 1943; Iowa City, Iowa, U.S.
- Died: July 16, 2020 (aged 76); New York City, New York, U.S.
- Education: University of Northern Iowa
- Occupation: Actress
- Years active: 1968–2020

Phyllis Jeanne Somerville (December 12, 1943 – July 16, 2020) was an American stage, film, and television actress. She is best known for her roles in Little Children (2006), The Curious Case of Benjamin Button (2008), Surviving Family (2012), The Big C (2010–2013), and Outsiders (2016–2017).

== Personal life ==
Somerville was born in Iowa City, Iowa, to Lefa Mary (née Pash; 1918–2011) and the Rev. Paul Somerville (1919–1995), who moved the family around as he preached at different churches, until settling in Traer, and eventually Cresco, Iowa. There, her mother worked as a librarian, and Phyllis attended high school, where she was involved with cheerleading, drama, and music, including playing clarinet in the All-State band. She had three brothers: Paul (clinical social worker, MBA) (1947–2005), Stephen (naval officer, forensic pathologist) and Bruce (artist).

She attended Morningside College and then transferred to the University of Northern Iowa, studying theatre and graduating with a degree in English in 1966. In college, she starred in productions such as The Visit, Electra, and Macbeth. She next did graduate work performing classical roles such as Puck in A Midsummer Night's Dream at the Hilberry Theatre through Wayne State University in Detroit and later became a resident equity actress with the Arena Stage in Washington, DC. Her first paid job as an entertainer was at Buckskin Joe amusement park over summer break in college.

She lived in New York City, where she died in 2020, aged 76, of natural causes.

== Theatre ==
Somerville made her Broadway debut as Wilma in the 1974 musical Over Here!, which was nominated for the Tony Award for Best Musical. The following year, she performed in the off-Broadway musical The Journey of Snow White as the Witch. She appeared in the 1978 Broadway production of Once in a Lifetime. In 1983, she was the understudy for Kathy Bates in the Broadway production of Marsha Norman's 'night, Mother, and later toured in the role opposite Mercedes McCambridge. In 1984, she originated the role of Glory in Norman's next play, Traveler in the Dark, at the American Repertory Theater.

In 1990, she originated the role of Joyce in The Sum of Us by David Stevens. In 2001, she originated the role of Hannah in the off-Broadway musical The Spitfire Grill, a role played in the 1996 film by Ellen Burstyn. In 2009, she performed in the musical Happiness at the Lincoln Center Theatre. She has appeared in other productions off-Broadway, as well as in regional theatre, including many roles with the Hartford Stage Company. She was a member of the LAByrinth Theater Company. In 2014, she appeared off-Broadway in an experimental all-female production of I Remember Mama, alongside Rita Gardner, Heather MacRae, and Barbara Barrie.

== Filmography ==
=== Film ===
| Year | Title | Role | Notes |
|---|---|---|---|
| 1981 | Arthur | Saleslady | |
| 1992 | Leap of Faith | Dolores | |
| 1997 | Trouble on the Corner | Crazy Woman | |
| 1998 | Montana | Waitress | |
| 1998 | The Impostors | Woman at Bar with Pills | |
| 1998 | Just One Time | Scratchy-voiced Woman | |
| 1998 | Curtain Call | Gladys | |
| 1998 | Better Living | Nellie | |
| 1999 | Simply Irresistible | Ruth | |
| 1999 | Bringing Out the Dead | Mrs. Burke | |
| 2001 | The Sleepy Time Gal | Rebecca's Adoptive Mother | |
| 2002 | Swimfan | Aunt Gretchen Christopher | |
| 2005 | Just Like the Son | Judge | |
| 2006 | Little Children | May MacGorvey | |
| 2007 | Broken English | Psychic | |
| 2007 | Lucky You | Pawnbroker | |
| 2008 | The Brooklyn Heist | Connie | |
| 2008 | The Curious Case of Benjamin Button | Grandma Fuller | |
| 2009 | The Mighty Macs | Sister Sister | |
| 2011 | One Fall | Mrs. Barrows | |
| 2011 | A Bird of the Air | Ivy Campbell | |
| 2012 | Forgetting the Girl | Ruby | |
| 2012 | Surviving Family | Mary Giaconne | |
| 2013 | Stoker | Mrs. McGarrick | |
| 2013 | The Double | Mrs. James | |
| 2015 | Stuff | Ginger | |
| 2016 | Detours | Annie Delaney | |
| 2017 | Our Souls at Night | Ruth | |
| 2018 | Diane | Ina | |
| 2019 | Poms | Helen | |

=== Television ===
| Year | Title | Role | Notes |
|---|---|---|---|
| 1990 | Law & Order | Ms. Maltese | Episode: "Subterranean Homeboy Blues" |
| 1991 | Law & Order | Kristen Cameron | Episode: "Heaven" |
| 1992 | Loving | Mrs. Swan | Episode #1.2201 |
| 1994 | As the World Turns | Alice | 1 episode |
| 1995 | New York News | Edith Schemer | Episode: "The Using Game" |
| 1995–1996 | NYPD Blue | Dorothy Russell | 2 episodes |
| 1998 | One Life to Live | Charlotte Stonecliff | Episode #1.7668 |
| 1998 | Guiding Light | Mrs. Beasley | Unknown episodes |
| 1998 | Sex and the City | Gertrude Morgan | Episode: "The Power of Female Sex" |
| 1998 | Homicide: Life on the Street | Faye Ann Ralston | Episode: "Brotherly Love" |
| 2000 | The Sopranos | Brenda | Episode: "Big Girls Don't Cry" |
| 2001 | Third Watch | Fran | Episode: "A Hero's Rest" |
| 2001 | Law & Order: Special Victims Unit | Mrs. Moss | Episode: "Victims" |
| 2002 | Law & Order: Criminal Intent | Mrs. McLeish | Episode: "The Third Horseman" |
| 2003 | Chappelle's Show | Old Lady #2 | Episode: "O'Dweeds & Trading Spouses" |
| 2004 | As the World Turns | Annabelle Fettle | 1 episode |
| 2004 | Law & Order: Criminal Intent | Louise Politano | Episode: "The Saint" |
| 2007 | Kidnapped | Annie Phillips | 3 episodes |
| 2008 | Life on Mars | Mrs. Raimes | Episode: "Out Here in the Fields" |
| 2010 | CSI: Miami | Louise Russo | Episode: "In the Wind" |
| 2010–2013 | The Big C | Marlene | 19 episodes |
| 2011 | Fringe | Alice Merchant | Episode: "6B" |
| 2013 | House of Cards | Russo's Mother | Episode: "Chapter 8" |
| 2013 | Unforgettable | Ruth | Episode: "Memory Kings" |
| 2013 | Elementary | Miriam Berg | Episode: "The Marchioness" |
| 2014 | Taxi Brooklyn | Sasha Lowenthal | Episode: "Brooklyn Heights" |
| 2014 | The Blacklist | Skye Kincaid | Episode: "The Mombasa Cartel" |
| 2015 | Blue Bloods | Beth Del Rio | Episode: "Occupational Hazards" |
| 2015 | The Night Shift | Marilyn Capshaw | Episode: "Eyes Look Your Last" |
| 2015 | Daredevil | Mrs. Vistain | 2 episodes |
| 2015 | The Good Wife | Louise Nolfi | Episode: "The Deconstruction" |
| 2016 | Impastor | Ester Strumble | Episode: "Guardian Angel" |
| 2016–2017 | Outsiders | Lady Ray | 13 episodes |
| 2017 | Unbreakable Kimmy Schmidt | Meemaw | Episode: "Kimmy Steps on a Crack!" |
| 2018 | Castle Rock | Leanne Chambers | Episode: "Severance" |
| 2018 | Madam Secretary | Gloria Paley | Episode: "Requiem" |
| 2021 | Mare of Easttown | Betty Carroll | Posthumous release |

=== Podcasts ===
| Year | Title | Role | Notes |
|---|---|---|---|
| 2016 | Homecoming | Ellen Bergman | 3 Episodes |

== Awards and nominations ==
| Year | Award / Festival | Category | Work | Result |
|---|---|---|---|---|
| 2006 | Awards Circuit Community Awards | Best Cast Ensemble | Little Children | Nominated |
| 2009 | Gold Derby Awards | Best Ensemble Cast | The Curious Case of Benjamin Button | Nominated |
| 2009 | Screen Actors Guild Awards | Outstanding Performance by a Cast in a Motion Picture | The Curious Case of Benjamin Button | Nominated |
| 2012 | Indie Gathering International Film Festival | Best Supporting Actress | Surviving Family | Nominated |
| 2012 | Golden Door Film Festival | Best Supporting Actress | Surviving Family | Won |
| 2016 | Long Island International Film Expo | Best Supporting Actress | Stuff | Won |
