= The Dead Thing =

American erotic drama film

- Release poster
- Directed by: Elric Kane
- Screenplay by: Elric Kane; Webb Wilcoxen
- Produced by: Matt Mercer; Monte Yazzie
- Starring: Blu Hunt; Ben Smith-Petersen
- Production companies: Yellow Veil Pictures; Rubric Pictures; Coda Films
- Distributed by: Shudder
- Release dates: 26 August 2024 (Fantasia); 14 February 2025 (United States)
- Running time: 94 minutes
- Country: United States
- Language: English

The Dead Thing is a 2024 American horror drama film directed by Elric Kane and co-written by Kane and Webb Wilcoxen. It stars Blu Hunt and Ben Smith-Petersen.

== Premise ==
A woman is charmed by a barista on a blind date, but after he disappears, she becomes determined to find out why.

== Cast ==
- Blu Hunt as Alex
- Ben Smith-Petersen as Kyle
- Katherine Hughes as Kara
- John Karna as Chris
- Joey Millin as Mark

== Production ==
The film is directed by Elric Kane and co-written by Kane and Webb Wilcoxen. It is produced by Matt Mercer and Monte Yazzie. Yellow Veil Pictures boarded worldwide sales in May 2024.

Blu Hunt and Ben Smith-Petersen lead the cast, which also includes Katherine Hughes, John Karna, and Joey Millin. Petersen had to film around his work as a stunt man on George Miller's film Furiosa: A Mad Max Saga that required him to shave his head and offered not to work on that film, but Kane was quoted as telling him "go to George Miller and we'll make it work. And we did."

== Release ==
The film had its world premiere at the Fantasia International Film Festival in 2024. It debuted on Shudder on 14 February 2025.

== Reception ==
On the review aggregator website Rotten Tomatoes, The Dead Thing holds an approval rating of 83% based on 40 reviews. The website's consensus reads: "A potent metaphor for toxic relationships, The Dead Thing unfolds slowly but proves haunting thanks to its eerie mood and Blu Hunt's committed performance." Metacritic, which uses a weighted average, assigned the film a score of 53 out of 100, based on 6 critics, indicating "mixed or average" reviews.
