= The Wedding Year =

- Theatrical release poster
- Directed by: Robert Luketic
- Written by: Donald Diego
- Produced by: Gary Lucchesi; Marc Reid; Mark Korshak
- Starring: Sarah Hyland; Tyler James Williams; Jenna Dewan; Matt Shively; Anna Camp
- Cinematography: Tom Banks
- Edited by: Beatrice Sisul; Peggy Eghbalian
- Music by: Raney Shockne
- Production company: Lakeshore Entertainment
- Distributed by: Entertainment Studios Motion Pictures
- Release date: September 20, 2019 (United States)
- Running time: 90 minutes
- Country: United States
- Language: English

The Wedding Year is a 2019 American romantic comedy film directed by Robert Luketic and starring Sarah Hyland, Tyler James Williams, Jenna Dewan, Matt Shively and Anna Camp.

Los Angeles photographer, Mara Baylor, "isn’t sure she is the marrying type and her new ready-to-settle-down boyfriend and commitment issues are put to the test when she is invited to 7 weddings in the same year", putting "pressure on Mara to make some big decisions."

It was released on September 20, 2019, by Entertainment Studios Motion Pictures.

== Plot ==
Mara Baylor, a Los Angeles photographer who works in a high-end vintage clothing shop, is best friends with Alex. Out for drinks with him, she uses a dating app to select someone to get a free dinner. In this case it is Jake Harrison, as he is a chef.

Out to dinner with Jake, after Mara orders an expensive dinner, he confesses he's not really a celebrity chef. A cook in a local diner, he instead offers to make her something. As Mara is eating her pancakes, Jake tells her he has just finished culinary school and is from Virginia. When he accuses her of using people for free food, she suggests they sleep together.

Mara and Jake start dating, which is unusual for her. Soon, her sister Jessica calls to announce her engagement. Cynical about marriage, as their parents had a painful divorce when they were young, she finds it difficult to congratulate her. Jake's big brother Robbie also calls to announce his engagement to Violet.

As they have been invited to more weddings than they can attend, Mara and Jake play a drinking game to narrow down the quantity. At the first of the 7, she meets Nicole, the intimidating ex he had moved to LA for from his hometown. Mara makes a drunk spectacle of herself.

At the second wedding, seeing that Alex is interested in Zak, Jake gets him an introduction. At Mara's boss Ellie's wedding, as Mara did not have eels at the rehearsal dinner and is therefore not ill, she is asked to be maid of honor. Around the fifth wedding, she and Jake talk about moving in together, she confesses she loves him and he suggests they get married.

At Jessica's wedding, the sixth, Mara tells her and Alex about their parents uncomfortable meeting with their parents. At Robbie's, soon Jake's family starts talking about them moving to Virginia and having kids. Seeing Violet on the run, Mara alerts Jake and Robbie and they follow her to a burger joint, where she finds her binge-eating. She is freaked out how baby obsessed his family is.

After the long flight to LA, the tired pair find Mara's car not functioning. As she and Jake await mechanical assistance, she asks him where he sees them in five years. Describing a house in Virginia with a room that could eventually be converted into a kid's room, Mara says she does not see herself as the marrying type and feels too much pressure from him. Not wanting to give up on her dream of a photography career, she gives the ring back.

Jake moves back east, getting a proper chef's job, and gets a positive review from a food critic. Nicole talks him into having a drink, then posts the photos on Facebook. Mara, who is still trying to get discovered for her photography, pauses to have a random hookup with the app. Heading home in a car in the morning, Alex calls to announce his engagement to Zak, warning her that Jake will also be invited to the wedding in a month's time.

At Alex and Zak's wedding, after Mara's speech, Jake approaches her. They both apologize, congratulate each other for their successes, admit they still love each other and he puts the ring back on her finger. Soon after, they adopt a rescue dog.

== Cast ==
- Sarah Hyland as Mara Baylor
- Tyler James Williams as Jake Harrison
- Jenna Dewan as Jessica
- Matt Shively as Alex
- Anna Camp as Ellie
- Noureen DeWulf as Boss Queen
- Wanda Sykes as Janet/Grandma
- Keith David as Preston
- Grace Helbig as Kelly
- Benton Jennings as Waiter
- Darlene Vogel as Mother
- Patrick Warburton as Michael
- Kristen Johnston as Barbara
- Camille Hyde as Nicole Whitney
- Zora Bikangaga as Robbie Harrison
- Laci Mosley as Violet Harrison
- Tom Connolly as Zak
- Martin Martinez as Alex
- Danielle Bux as Megan
- Ryan Malaty as Ron
- Dominic Leeder as Brendan
- Jimmy Walker Jr. as Pastor Watkins
- Thomas Kasp as Peter

== Production ==
=== Development ===
On August 4, 2016, it was reported that Lakeshore Entertainment has acquired a romantic comedy spec script written by Donald Diego. On May 1, 2018, it was announced that Lakeshore would be presenting the movie for sales at the 2018 Cannes Film Festival.

The film was directed by Robert Luketic, produced by Gary Lucchesi, Marc Reid, and Mark Korshak, and executive produced by Sarah Hyland.

=== Casting ===
On May 1, 2018, it was announced that Sarah Hyland would play the lead in the romantic comedy as Los Angeles photographer, Mara Baylor. On May 29, 2018, Tyler James Williams joined the production as Jake Riddick, the boyfriend of Mara Baylor. On May 30, 2018, it was announced that Anna Camp, Wanda Sykes, Jenna Dewan, Keith David, Patrick Warburton, Tom Connolly, Grace Helbig and Fred Grandy would also be joining the production. Grandy did not end up in the final production.

=== Filming ===
Principal photography for the film begin on May 21, 2018, in Los Angeles, United States. Filming concluded on July 10, 2018.

== Release ==
In May 2019, Entertainment Studios Motion Pictures acquired distribution rights to the film.

The film was released on September 20, 2019.
