= J. D. Williams =

American actor (born 1978)

- Born: Darnell Williams; May 22, 1978 (age 48); Newark, New Jersey, U.S.
- Occupation: Actor
- Years active: 1994–present
- Known for: "Bodie Broadus" in The Wire and Kenny Wangler in Oz

Darnell "J. D." Williams (born May 22, 1978) is an American actor known for his starring roles in the HBO television series Oz as Kenny Wangler, The Wire as Bodie Broadus and Pootie Tang as Froggy, Surviving Family (2012) as Bobby, The Good Wife (2010–2015) as Dexter, and in the main cast of Saints & Sinners. He also starred in Blood Brother (2018) as Kayvon.

== Early life ==
Williams was born in Newark, New Jersey. He attended Newark Arts High School, a performing arts public school in Newark. He portrayed a biracial 15-year-old dealing with racism and his father's infidelity in the play A.M. Sunday in late 2003 at Baltimore's Centerstage theater. He had a number of cameos and leading roles in R&B and hip-hop music videos between 2002 and 2005.

== Career ==
Williams appeared in Homicide: Life on the Street, a show based on a book by The Wire creator David Simon, where he guest-starred as Casper in the episode "The Why Chromosome". He had a small guest starring role in The Sopranos episode "46 Long" as Special K, an incompetent stickup man and one of Brendan Filone's goons. He went on to play series regular, inmate Kenny Wangler, in the first four seasons of Oz. He then appeared in HBOs The Wire as Bodie Broadus, a Barksdale Organization drug dealer who slowly rises through the ranks throughout the seasons. In preparation for the role, he walked around Baltimore's inner city during the middle of the night a few days before the first taping; talking about this to AllHipHop, Williams stated "it was like 12 or 1:00 in the morning. I just threw on a black hoodie and walked around. I went to one of their hoods and watched that night. I learned not to do that no more, I was lucky I made it back that night." He is older than his character by eight years.

According to his original HBO bio, he is credited with appearing in the film Graffiti Bridge, but a 2003 interview with AllHipHop revealed that Williams was not in the movie. The page no longer exists, however. Tevin Campbell filled the cameo role with which Williams was credited.

Williams has had leading roles or cameo appearances in a number of R&B and hip-hop music videos. He has appeared as himself, a love interest, and characters resembling his role as a drug dealer on The Wire.

In 2012, Williams had a major supporting role in the indie film Surviving Family as the ex-boyfriend of the main character. His character was a wounded veteran of the war in Iraq who had lost an eye in an IED attack and suffered from PTSD.

He has starred in a number of commercials, and played a delivery man in a FedEx commercial. He appeared as Lemond Bishop's Lieutenant "Dexter" in episodes of The Good Wife.

== Filmography ==
=== Film ===
Year	Title	Role	Notes
1994	Death Riders	Buzz Saw	
1999	The 24 Hour Woman	Toy Store Clerk	
2001	Pootie Tang	Froggy	
2001	Popcorn Shrimp	Bubba	Short
2001	Snipes	J.D.	
2002	Mr. Smith Gets a Hustler	Abe	
2002	Durdy Game	Little Man	Video
2005	Two Guns	Bill	Video
2007	4 Life	Pooh	Video
2007	The Second Line	Natt	Short
2008	Cash Rules	Spike (J.D.)	Video
2009	Falling Awake	D-Money	
2010	Code Blue	Wicked	
2011	Happy New Year	Jerome	
2011	Shanghai Hotel	Thump	
2011	After Hours: The Movie	D.C.	
2012	Zoo	Red	
2012	Surviving Family	Bobby	
2013	Chinese Puzzle	Le barman	
2013	The Lost Book Of Rap	Hassen	Short
2014	An American in Hollywood	Dorian	
2014	Cymbeline	Quarry Cop 2	
2014	Shelter	Drug Dealer	
2016	Guns and Grams	BK	
2016	The Choir	Police Officer	Short
2017	Served Film	Uncle Q	Short film
2018	Blood Brother	Kayvon	
2018	Clipped Wings, They Do Fly	Toby Johnson	
2019	The Probe	Stink	TV movie
2020	One Sweet Night	Ossian Sweet	Short
2021	Bruiser	Malcolm	Short

=== Television ===
Year	Title	Role	Notes
1997	New York Undercover	Victor	Episode: "Fade Out"
1997–2000	Oz	Kenny Wangler	Guest: season 1-2, Supporting Cast: season 3-4
1998	Law & Order	2nd Kid	Episode: "Castoff"
1999	The Sopranos	Special K	Episode: "46 Long"
1999	Trinity	Malik	Episode: "Breaking In, Breaking Out, Breaking Up, Breaking Down"
1999	Homicide: Life on the Street	Damon 'Casper' Kelly	Episode: "The Why Chromosome"
1999	Third Watch	Pee Wee	Episode: "Welcome to Camelot"
2000	Sex and the City	Sweet Sauce	Episode: "No Ifs, Ands or Butts"
2001	100 Centre Street	William Floyd	Episode: "Bobby & Cynthia" & "Queenie and Joe"
2001	Big Apple	Derrick	Episode: "A Ministering Angel"
2002–06	The Wire	Preston 'Bodie' Broadus	Recurring cast: Season 1-2, main cast: Season 3-4
2007	The Kill Point	Marshall O'Brien, Jr./Mr. Cat	Main cast
2009	Nite Tales: The Series	Rapper	Episode: "Trapped"
2010–11	Detroit 1-8-7	Pup Clemmons	Episode: "Royal Bubbles/Needle Drop" & "Stone Cold"
2010–15	The Good Wife	Dexter Roja	Recurring cast: Season 2 & 4 & 6
2012	Blue Bloods	Benjamin Banks	Episode: "No Questions Asked"
2014	The Following	Carlos	Recurring cast: Season 2
2014	Black Box	George	Recurring cast
2015	Deadbeat	Frank	Episode: "The Polaroid Flasher"
2016	Law & Order: Special Victims Unit	Detective Anton Jefferson	Episode: "Manhattan Transfer" & "Unholiest Alliance"
2016	The Night Of	Trevor Williams	Recurring cast
2016–22	Saints & Sinners	Jabari Morris	Main cast
2020	Manifest	Walter	Episode: "Coordinated Flight"
2024–25	BMF	J-Pusha	Recurring cast Season 3 & 4

=== Video games ===
Year	Title	Role
2005	The Warriors	Additional Soldier
2005	True Crime: New York City	
2008	Midnight Club: Los Angeles	Henry
