= Katherine Hughes (actress) =

American actress and singer

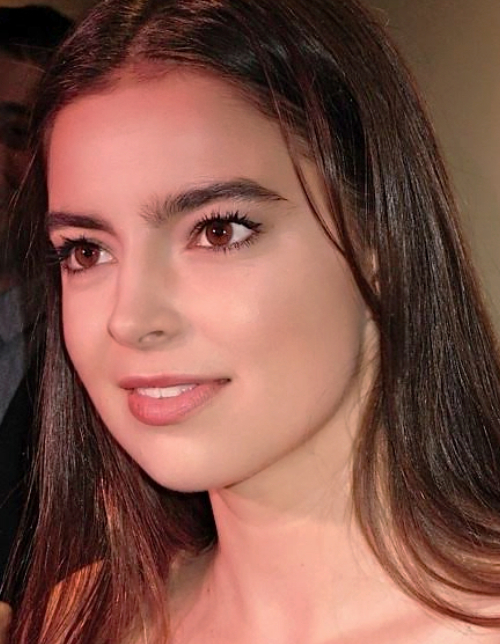
- Hughes in 2015
- Born: Katherine C. Hughes; New York City, U.S.
- Occupations: Actress; singer
- Years active: 2009–present

Katherine C. Hughes is an American actress and singer. She has guest starred in NBC's Law & Order: SVU, CBS's Blue Bloods, Men, Women & Children, had a supporting role in the film Me and Earl and the Dying Girl. and main roles in the series My Dead Ex and Perfect Commando.

== Career ==
Hughes competed in Radio Disney's Next Big Thing, season 5 for a chance to record her own single and a guest starring role on Austin & Ally to perform her song. Although she did not make it to the finals, she made it to third place. She has since moved to Los Angeles to continue to pursue acting.

== Filmography ==
=== Film ===
Year	Title	Role	Notes
2011	Roadie	Young Nikki	
2012	Surviving Family	Lily Fulton	
2014	Men, Women & Children	Brooke Benton	
2015	Me and Earl and the Dying Girl	Madison Hartner	
2016	Dirty 30	Kinsey	
2017	Say You Will	Ellie Vaughn	
2017	September Morning	Lynz	
2018	Monsoon	Sarah	
2019	Ambition	Jude Hunter	
2022	Tangled	Katherine "Kate" Brooks	
2024	The Dead Thing	Kara	
TBA	The Crawling	Emma	Post-production

=== Television ===
Year	Title	Role	Notes
2009	Law & Order: Special Victims Unit	Tina	Episode: "Users"
2012	Blue Bloods	Amy	Episode: "No Questions Asked"
2016	#ThisIsCollege	Gigi	Episode: "Relationship Status"
2017	Kingdom	Kayla	Recurring role; 7 episodes
2018	My Dead Ex	Charley	Main role
2020	Perfect Commando	Rachel	Main role
2021	The Goldbergs	Jean Jacobs	Episode: "Mr. Ships Ahoy"
2022	Echo 3	Reese Keller	Apple TV+ series
2024–present	Tell Me Lies	Molly	5 episodes
