= Steven Wishnoff =

American actor

- Born: August 10, 1959 (age 66); New York City, New York, United States
- Occupations: Actor, Casting professional & Television producer

Steven Wishnoff is an actor, casting professional and television producer who has twice been nominated for an Emmy Award.

== Acting ==
=== Television ===
Wishnoff played Tony Masters, the leader of the gay gang on the HBO television series Oz, from season two until the show's sixth and final season.

Other television acting credits include The Richard Bey Show, Mike Nichols's Angels in America for HBO, Sex and the City (episode 1), Late Night with Conan O'Brien, Law & Order and New York Undercover.

=== Film ===
Wishnoff's film credits include [[Marci X]], Joel Schumacher's Flawless and Stonewall. He was John Goodman's stunt and photo double on film and television projects including Martin Scorsese’s Bringing Out the Dead, Glen Gordon Caron's Now and Again and Coyote Ugly.

=== Stage ===
Some of Wishnoff's onstage credits are Albin/Zaz in several productions of La Cage aux Folles, Amos Hart in several productions of Chicago and Vivian McVanish in the Drama Desk Award-winning Howard Crabtree's Whoop Dee Doo.Regarding Wishnoff's portrayal of Amos Hart in the Boston production of Chicago, Peter Filicia, a writer for TheaterWeek, wrote:

"...Billy Flynn sings the line 'give them an act that's unassailable, they'll wait a week til you're available.' A smart producer would wait a year or two until he [Wishnoff] is available. ...this is as good a portrayal as I have ever seen."

He is also a musician and has performed music and directed productions and recordings. He was the musical director of The Real Live Brady Bunch at the Village Gate Theater in New York City when the original cast moved to the Westwood Playhouse in Los Angeles.

== Producing, writing ==
Wishnoff is the creator and writer of the multi-award winning web series Life Interrupted starring Mason Reese, Alison Arngrim, Dawn Wells, Erin Murphy, Robbie Rist and Michael Learned. The series has won multiple awards across several festivals including awards for his Direction, Writing, Producing as well as several awards for the shows theme song which he co-wrote with Robbie Rist.

Steven Wishnoff was the writer of the Los Angeles Area EMMYS for 5 years beginning in 2008. He was the writer and producer of "LGBT Above and Below the Line"' for The Academy of Television Arts & Sciences (featuring Billy Crystal and hosted by Bruce Vilanch), as well as the writer and producer of "LGBT Youth in Television: Teens, Tweens and More!", hosted by Kathy Griffin. Wishnoff was segment producer of T.V.'s All-Time Funniest for ABC, senior writer-producer for Court TV (aka truTV), supervising producer (pre-production) for "The Jazz Awards", senior producer for Nick at Nite and TVLand.com, and has written/produced for Kathy Griffin, Danny Bonaduce and Barry Williams (among others).
