= Surviving Family =

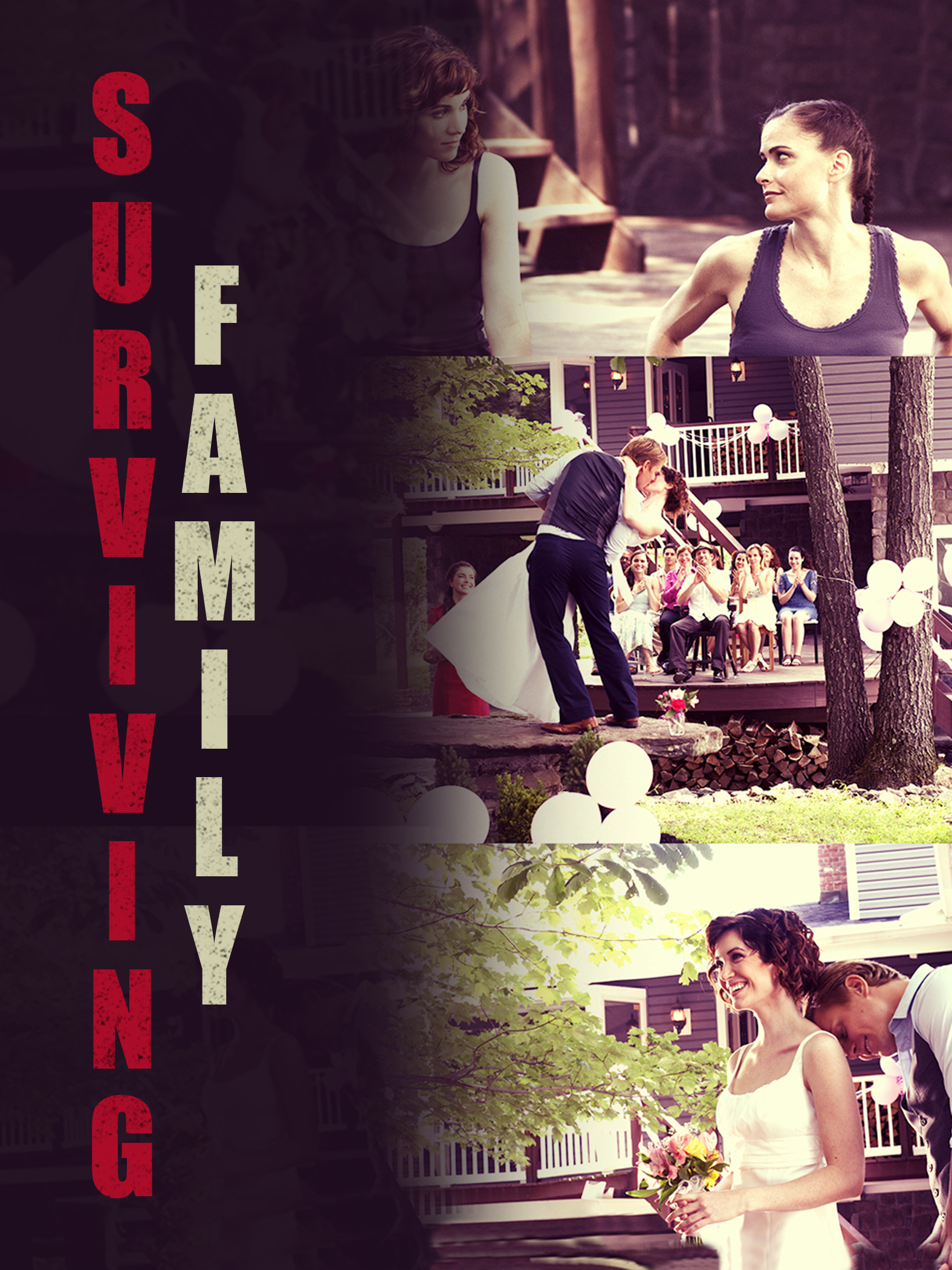
- Promotional film poster
- Directed by: Laura Thies
- Written by: Mara Lesemann
- Produced by: Mara Lesemann; Carlo Fiorletta
- Starring: Billy Magnussen; Sarah Wilson; Tara Westwood; Bill Sage; Johnny Hopkins; J. D. Williams; Phyllis Somerville; Vincent Pastore; Katherine C. Hughes
- Cinematography: Timothy Naylor
- Edited by: Laura Thies
- Music by: Barry Salmon
- Production company: Surviving Family Productions
- Release date: August 5, 2012
- Running time: 87 minutes
- Language: English

Surviving Family is a 2012 American drama about the effects of mental illness and alcoholism on the fictional Malone family. It was directed by Laura Thies and written by Mara Lesemann. The film stars Billy Magnussen, Sarah Wilson, Tara Westwood, Bill Sage, Johnny Hopkins, J. D. Williams, Vincent Pastore, Phyllis Somerville, and Katherine C. Hughes. Surviving Family premiered at the 2012 Woods Hole Film Festival, where it was the Runner Up for the Jury Award for Best Narrative Feature.

It was released on iTunes on August 15, 2014.

== Plot ==
Surviving Family counterpoints romance and comedy as it examines the dramatic role of alcoholism, mental illness, and suicide in the lives of the fictional Malone family.

Terry Malone shows up unannounced on her father's doorstep - with her fiancé and a plan to get married in five days. She learns that she's not the only one in the family with secrets. As Terry struggles to rebuild her relationship with her older sister Jean, she learns that her young niece Lily has been diagnosed with bipolar disorder. With the help of her Aunt Mary, Terry must come to terms with the truth behind her mother's suicide and her father's alcoholism.

== Cast ==
- Billy Magnussen as Alex D'Amico
- Sarah Wilson as Terry Malone
- Tara Westwood as Jean Malone Fulton
- Bill Sage as Jerry Fulton
- Johnny Hopkins as Hank Malone
- J. D. Williams as Bobby
- Phyllis Somerville as Mary Giaccone
- Vincent Pastore as Mayor Avenoso
- Katherine C. Hughes as Lily Fulton

== Production ==
Director Laura Thies had previously collaborated with producers Mara Lesemann and Carlo Fiorletta on several short movies, and came on board early in the pre-production process.

The movie was shot over 20 days in July and August 2011 on a Red One camera. Shooting locations were in New Jersey (Teaneck and Jersey City), New York City, and Bushkill, Pennsylvania.

Barry Salmon wrote the score. The soundtrack includes Bach's Prelude to Cello Suite No. 1 in G Major, BWV 1007, performed by Canadian cellist Stéphane Tétreault. Thies found the young violinist on YouTube.

== Release ==
Surviving Family premiered at the 22nd annual Woods Hole Film Festival on Cape Cod, MA on August 5, 2012. It was the Runner Up for the Jury Award for Best Narrative Feature at the Festival. It went on to screen at 18 other festivals in the US and Canada, winning 20 awards.

== Home media ==
Surviving Family was released on iTunes on August 15, 2014. Amazon Prime was added in December of that year, Vimeo on Demand was added in March 2019, and TubiTV was added in March 2020. Hoopla, a free streaming service through public libraries in the US and Canada, added the film to its platform in November 2020.
