= Augustus Hill =

- Oz character
- First appearance: "The Routine" (episode 1.01)
- Last appearance: "Exeunt Omnes" (episode 6.08)
- Portrayed by: Harold Perrineau

Augustus Hill is a fictional character, played by Harold Perrineau on the American television show Oz, serving as the show's narrator.

== Character overview ==
Mentored by his godfather Burr Redding, Hill started selling and using drugs during his teenage years. In 1995, a SWAT team raided Hill's apartment while he and his wife were having sex. Finding himself cornered on the roof of the building as he tried to escape, he shot and killed one officer. The others threw him off the roof in retaliation, leaving him paralyzed from the waist down, after which he began using a wheelchair. At the Oswald Maximum Security Penitentiary ("Oz"), Hill is a mostly neutral figure. Throughout much of his time in Oz, he remains one of the more consistently decent characters, struggling to avoid moral compromises while staying alive in the prison. Hill also serves as the narrator of the series, breaking the fourth wall in his monologues, even after his death at the end of the fifth season.

=== Season 1 ===
Hill is one of the inmates sent to "Emerald City," an experimental cell block designed to rehabilitate prisoners from differing backgrounds. He works in the dress factory with inmates Bob Rebadow and Tobias Beecher. When conjugal visits are allowed, Hill sleeps with his wife Annabella for the last time; as he is paraplegic, he has no sensation below his waist and cannot experience the pleasure received during sex. When Simon Adebisi asks why Hill even wants to have sex with his wife without sensation, he replies it is all for her.

Despite being clean for almost two years, Hill started using again with the encouragement of his favorite NBA player, Jackson Vahue, after he arrives in Oz. After using twice and falling out with Vahue, he stops his habit again. Hill admires Eugene Dobbins, an inmate who has a gift for playing the cello. When Dobbins is harassed by Vahue for no apparent reason, Hill tells him stop and recognize the gift that Dobbins has. However, Vahue breaks into Father Ray Mukada's office and smashes Dobbins' instrument. When a prison riot erupts in Em City, Hill forces Vahue to tend to Dobbins after he is shanked by a black inmate. He hides with the rest of the prisoners as the SORT team recaptures the unit.

=== Season 2 ===
Law school dean Alvah Case interviews Hill as part of his investigation into the riot. Hill is told that Dobbins has died. When Em City is reopened, he is angered when he is assigned with a prisoner group called the "Others" — along with Rebadow, Beecher, and Agamemnon Busmalis — instead of the Homeboys, the black gangsters in Oz. He is wary of rooming with Beecher, who recently bit off the tip of the penis of an Aryan inmate. When the judge from Hill's trial is sent to Oz for taking bribes while sentencing inmates, Hill asks black Muslim inmate Kareem Said to help get him freed. It is determined the judge had fairly sentenced Hill. Frustrated, he spends the rest of the season figuring out ways of escaping Oz.

=== Season 3 ===
Inmate Malcolm Coyle confesses to Hill that he got away with murdering a family. Hill and Said inform Warden Leo Glynn, who contacts the district attorney. When the Homeboys plot to murder Hill, Said convinces Antonio Nappa, Carmen Guerra, and Vernon Schillinger to have their respective gangs aid the Muslims in protecting Hill. Nappa murders Coyle before his trial, deterring the Homeboys from taking any action. When Adebisi takes over the Homeboys, he stirs up racial tension in Oz to the point that inmates lose their pornographic magazines. After Adebisi gives Hill a confiscated magazine as a truce, corrections officer Sean Murphy has Hill thrown into solitary confinement. The tensions cause Glynn to lock down Oz. As Adebisi had intended in his scheme to stir racial tensions.

=== Season 4 ===
==== Part I ====
After three weeks, Hill returns to Em City and rooms with Desmond Mobay. Unbeknownst to Hill, Mobay is an undercover detective named Johnny Basil who is investigating Oz's drug trade. In the visiting room, Hill thinks he recognizes Mobay's girlfriend, forcing Mobay to put a halt to their visits. Mobay begins abusing heroin and decides he has to kill a random inmate to get in the good graces of the Homeboys. Hill initially refuses to help Mobay, but is manipulated into doing so and watches as Desmond pushes inmate Bruno Goergen down an elevator shaft. Mobay also accidentally loses his accent one night, drawing Hill's suspicion. When Hill realizes the truth and confronts Mobay, he is beaten out of his wheelchair. Mobay turns himself in for killing Goergen.

==== Part II ====
The Homeboys are in disarray in the wake of Adebisi's death. Possible salvation appears when Redding comes to Oz and immediately takes control of the gang. Hill becomes more involved with the Homeboys as a result. The Italians and the Latinos plot to eliminate Redding, who intends on taking back power in the drug scene. Kevin Ketchum (using a moniker Supreme), whom Redding despises, is released from solitary and offered a third in the drug trade from the competing gangs. When Hill asks why Redding hates Ketchum, he learns that Ketchum gave up Hill's location to avoid prison and is culpable for his capture and paralysis. Furious, Hill attacks Allah and ends up hospitalized. In retaliation, Redding arranges for Ketchum to be killed, only for him to survive the attempt.

Redding plans to eliminate the Italians and the Latinos, but Hill doesn't want violence and alerts Murphy of the plan. When Murphy breaks up the murder attempt, Redding casts Hill out of the gang. Meanwhile, Hill sabotages Vahue's parole, feeling he has shown no remorse. As the gang war within Oz escalates, Ketchum tries to ally himself with Hill for the purpose of using him to kill Redding. When Ketchum is set to kill Redding on his own, Hill obtains Ketchum's medical records and learns he is lethally allergic to eggs. With this information, Hill has the Homeboys mix Ketchum's food with a heavy concentration of eggs, resulting in his death in the cafeteria. Redding forgives Hill and allows him to rejoin the Homeboys. Hill respectfully declines, as he does not feel good about causing Ketchum's death, but keeps Redding's good will nonetheless.

=== Season 5 ===
Hill is warned by his mother Eugenia that his wife plans to divorce him. Eugenia then dies when the visitor's bus crashes. Distraught by the bad news, Hill becomes a complete emotional wreck and begins using heroin. Under the influence, he forgets to clean his catheter and goes into kidney failure. McManus assumes Redding sold the heroin to Hill, but Redding denies any involvement and vows to bring down the men responsible. Arnold "Poet" Jackson, the inmate who sold the drugs, gets Busmalis to frame Italian inmate Salvatore DeSanto. Redding has Poet put a lethal amount of LSD in DeSanto's food. As he recovers, Hill refuses to give up Poet but exonerates the Italians.

Poet next forces Busmalis to finger the Latinos, ending the alliance between them and the Homeboys. Hill is released after Redding and Latino leader Enrique Morales are sent to solitary for fighting. Redding has a long talk with Hill, stating that he is sorry for ever encouraging him to do or sell drugs in the first place. During this talk, the Latinos and Italians renew their alliance on the condition that the Italians kill Redding. Hill and Redding's reconciliation is short lived, Frank Urbano charges at Redding with a knife but is stopped by Hill, who during the melee is stabbed defending his adoptive father. Hill's death puts Redding in complete disarray, leaving him distraught and dispirited Hill's demise motivates him to have the Homeboys drop out of the drugs trade.
