= Sebastian Monroe =

Sebastian Monroe may refer to:

- Sebastian Monroe (model), American fashion model
- Sebastian Monroe (Revolution), character in Revolution
