= Milengrad =

Mediaeval castle in northern Croatia

Coordinates: 46.1633°N 16.1703°E

Milengrad (Hungarian: Milen vára) is a mediaeval castle 2 kilometres (1.2 mi) northwest from Zajezda village, in Budinščina municipality, Krapina-Zagorje County, Croatia.

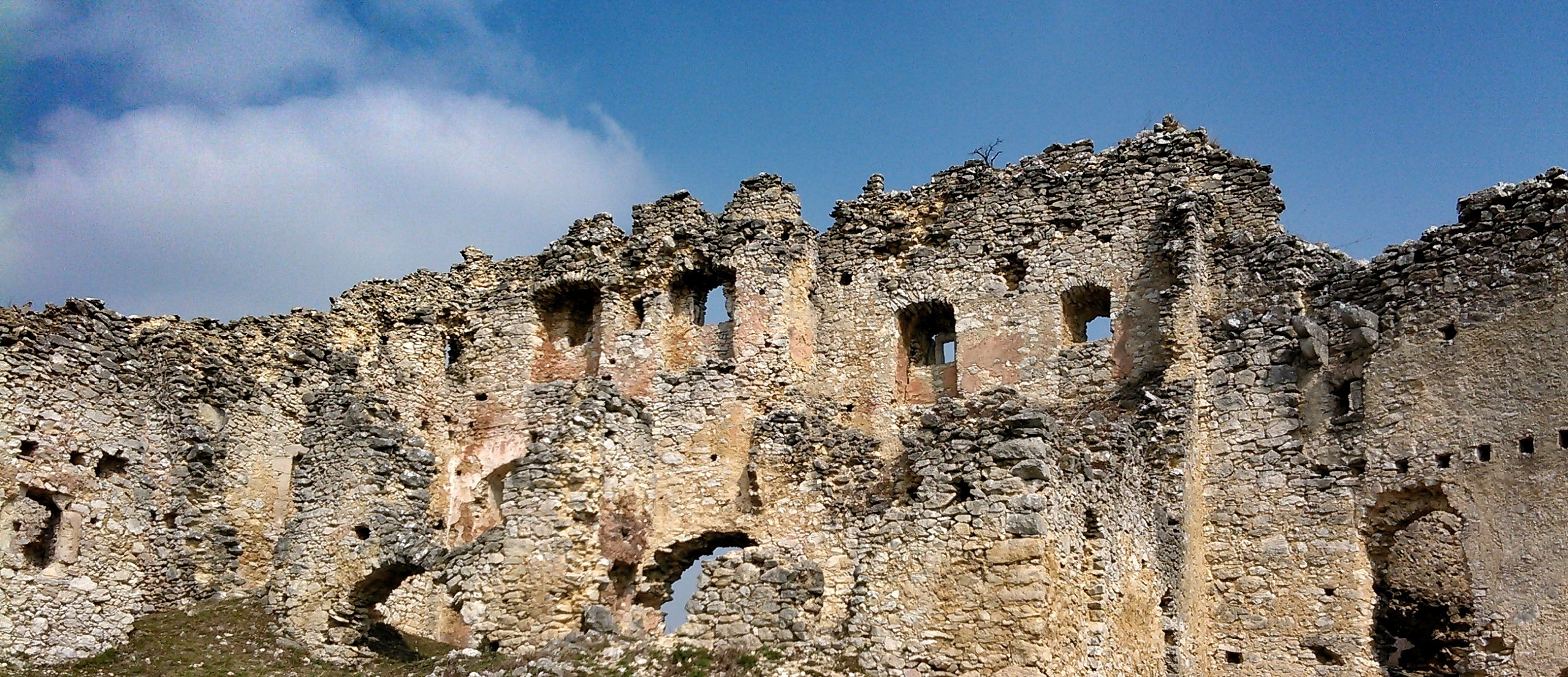
Ruins of Milengrad

== Name ==
Milengrad is a compound name – Milen being a proper noun and grad meaning castle or fortress in Croatian. Thus Milengrad is Milen's castle. In mediaeval documents it was called Mel(l)en, Milen and Miluan. Its Hungarian equivalents, Milen vára or Mileni vár, derive from the Croatian form and have the same meaning.

== History ==
Ground plan of the castle

Milengrad was built during the reign of Hungarian–Croatian King Béla IV after the Mongol invasion of 1241–1242. Around 1303, King Charles Robert donated the fortress to the Cseszneky family in compensation for their loss of Ipolyvisk Castle. The counts Cseszneky sold it soon to Ban Mikcs, who, in 1309, ceded the lordship to the Herkffy family. In 1536, by the marriage between Katalin Herkffy and Miklós Patačić, Milengrad became the two families' shared property. In the 17th century, the Herkffy family became extinct, and the Patačićs followed in the 19th century. Due to the constant warfare with the Ottomans, and probably as well to an earthquake, by the late 17th century several walls of Milengrad fell down, and in 1683 it was already mentioned as arx diruta, a castle in ruins.

== Sources ==
- Branko Nadilo in Građevinar n. 56. 2004/1
- Đuro Szabo: Középkori várak Horvátországban és Szlavóniában, Zagreb, 1920 [Medieval cities in Croatia and Slavonia]
- Codex Diplomaticus Hungaricus Andegavensis
- Almanach of Hungarian noble families
