= James Devlin (Oz) =

Fictional character

Governor James Devlin is a fictional character on the HBO drama Oz, played by Željko Ivanek.

== Character overview ==
James Devlin is the governor of an unspecified U.S. state. His draconian legislation, designed to emphasize punishment in the correctional system, makes him a figure hated by Oz's inmate population and several staff members. He is frequently shown as opportunistic and morally dubious, using his strict laws to deflect attention from his political corruption. Devlin is shown as a sadistic elitist only out for himself, an image he doesn't bother to hide in private. He knows that the public views him as such but will vote for him because he gets the results they want.

=== Season 1 ===
Devlin passes laws prohibiting several basic freedoms, such as smoking and conjugal visits, from inmates statewide; as a result, tension builds within prison walls. He also reinstates the death penalty, which had been abolished in the state for thirty years. Kareem Saïd, an inmate in Oz, and Tim McManus, the manager of Oz's "Emerald City" cell block, openly oppose Devlin. However, the governor's edicts are enforced by Warden Leo Glynn. Saïd decides to protest Devlin's measures by leading Oz's inmates in a prison riot, issuing a list of demands and holding several guards hostage. While Glynn and McManus feel that several of the demands are reasonable, Devlin orders a SORT team to recapture Em City. During the ensuing violence, two guards and six inmates are killed while Em City is left a ruin.

=== Season 2 ===
Devlin has law school dean Alvah Case investigate the riot, offering to appoint him as state attorney general if he prosecutes the guilty parties. However, Case concludes that no one in particular was at fault and suggests that Devlin is just as culpable as the prisoners. When the governor furiously rescinds his appointment offer, Case threatens to run against him in the next election. Devlin is forced to acknowledge Case's findings at a press conference. Meanwhile, Devlin ends funding for McManus' inmate GED program, and decides to make the announcement after Oz's graduation ceremony. However, McManus undermines Devlin's stunt by announcing the completion of the program earlier than the governor anticipated. Off camera, Devlin tells McManus that this ploy will ultimately make no difference as to what the state's voters will think about his actions.

After an Oz inmate named Jiggy Walker accuses Devlin of purchasing crack cocaine from him, the governor holds a press conference discrediting Walker and proving his innocence. However, Glynn wonders if Devlin bribed Walker as a means of setting up the press conference. During the month of Ramadan, Devlin decides to pardon a Muslim inmate as a means of boosting his popularity in both the state's Muslim and African-American communities. He pardons Saïd, who then humiliates him by refusing the pardon and accusing him of instigating the riot.

=== Season 3 ===
Devlin deals with issues involving Dr. Gloria Nathan, the chief attending physician in Oz, who opposes a bid by the Weigart Corporation to privatize the prison's health care system, and objects when Weigart head Frederick Garvey orders that inmate Miguel Alvarez be taken off of anti-depressants as a way of reducing the costs of medical care. Alvarez is later found trying to hang himself in solitary confinement. Garvey fires Nathan — only to be fired himself when Devlin ends Weigart's contract. Devlin blackmails Garvey into re-hiring Nathan, in a ploy to make himself look compassionate to voters.

=== Season 4 ===
==== Part I ====
Glynn runs as Devlin's lieutenant governor, even though he realizes that he is a token minority in an otherwise all-white campaign. Devlin's office quickly pressures Glynn to fire McManus, replacing him with Martin Querns. When Alvarez and Agamemnon Busmalis break out of Oz, Devlin's office suggests that while their escape is initially appealing to the public, they will want them captured and returned promptly. Later, at Devlin's suggestion, Glynn publicly divulges his brother's life sentence for murder and his daughter's rape. Clayton Hughes, a former corrections officer at Oz, makes numerous speeches condemning Devlin as representing all that is evil within white society. At a press conference, Hughes attempts to assassinate Devlin, temporarily crippling him. Glynn is forced to drop out of the race, while Devlin wins re-election.

==== Part II ====
Devlin is reinaugurated as governor, but not before allowing a television crew to investigate happenings at Oz, but the footage is not aired. He is then seen at Oz's annual warden's conference on crutches, mockingly telling Glynn to thank Hughes for helping him win the election. Devlin encounters controversy in the death sentence of William Giles, who wishes to be stoned to death. After Sister Pete makes an unsuccessful attempt to change the form of capital punishment, other psychiatrists deem Giles as insane, and his death sentence is overturned.

=== Season 5 ===
Devlin appoints Eleanor O'Connor, McManus' ex-wife, as a state liaison to address political concerns from Oz's staff. Devlin reaffirms his support for the death penalty during the sentencing of Oz inmate Cyril O'Reily for the murder of another prisoner, Li Chen. As O'Reily has a low IQ, his execution causes several liberal groups to call for an appeal against his sentence. Devlin's public image then diminishes, although efforts to stop O'Reily's execution fail.

=== Season 6 ===
Race riots erupt statewide as Wilson Loewen, a powerful mayor who aided Devlin's election, is convicted for his involvement in a 1963 murder of two black girls by the Ku Klux Klan. Devlin makes the situation worse when, off the record, he says that he will pardon Loewen. He is forced to publicly backtrack and send Loewen to Oz to placate the black community. However, Devlin tells Glynn that he will pardon Loewen after the public uproar dies out, and orders the warden to protect Loewen while he is incarcerated. When Loewen blackmails Devlin for an immediate pardon, Devlin has his African-American assistant, Perry Loftus, use staff member Adrian Johnson to arrange Loewen's murder. Meanwhile, Devlin suggests that O'Reily undergo ECT treatment despite the protests of O'Reily's family and attorneys.

As Glynn and a detective investigate Loewen's murder, they discover Johnson's involvement. When Devlin and Loftus are informed of what's happening, the governor has the detective replaced to draw suspicion away from himself. Glynn ultimately learns the truth, causing Devlin and Loftus to order Johnson to arrange for Glynn's death. Johnson pays an inmate to kill Glynn, whose death angers Oz's staff. After McManus ties the governor's office to the murders, Devlin orders Querns to fire him. When Oz is evacuated during an anthrax attack, Devlin realizes that McManus is on the verge of ending his political career. During the final episode, several clues indicate that Devlin remains in office. However, McManus is still shown in his position, making the ultimate outcome inconclusive.
