= Ferdo Ivanek =

American electrical engineer (1923–2021)

- Born: June 1, 1923; Ljubljana, Yugoslavia
- Died: October 2, 2021 (aged 98)
- Education: University of Zagreb; TU Wien
- Spouse: Vojka Ivanek
- Children: Željko and Ivan Ivanek
- Parent(s): Ivan and Lily Ivanek
- Scientific career
- Fields: Electrical engineering Microwave engineering
- Workplaces: Stanford University; Fairchild Semiconductor; Communications Research

Ferdo Ivanek (June 1, 1923 – October 2, 2021) was an American electrical engineer of Yugoslav origin. He is best known for his contributions to microwave oscillators and amplifiers. He is the father of the American actor Željko Ivanek.

== Biography ==
Ferdinand Ivanek was born in Ljubljana, and grew up in the village of Zajezda in Hrvatsko Zagorje, and then moved to Varaždin where he completed middle school. During World War II, Ivanek's parents were hanged by the fascist Ustaše, while he also lost some 20 Jewish relatives on his mother's side, in Ustaše and Nazi concentration camps, as recounted in a book by his cousin Paul Schreiner.

Ivanek received his engineer's degree at the Technical High School in Zagreb (today's University of Zagreb) in 1948. Afterwards he moved to Vienna to study electrical engineering, and he received his bachelor's degree and Ph.D. in electrical engineering from TU Wien. Between 1949 and 1955 Ivanek worked for his scholarship at the Central Radio Institute in Belgrade, then moved to Ljubljana where his family spent another decade. Between 1956 and 1957, he was employed at the University of Ljubljana's Institute for Telecommunications.

At the time in Yugoslavia, he worked in Zagreb, Belgrade, Ljubljana, Split before he moved abroad. In 1959, he emigrated to the United States to work as a research assistant at Stanford University's Microwave Integrated Circuits Laboratory, where he remained until 1962.

He received his doctorate in Vienna in 1964. He later also obtained a doctorate in Zagreb in 1965. Between 1964 and 1967, when the Ljubljana research institute that specialized in radio equipment design and manufacturing was named the Institute for Automation (later part of the Iskra conglomerate), he was an advisor and a manager of research projects.

In 1967, he returned to the United States to work at Fairchild Semiconductor's Research and Development Division, where he focused on the applications of solid-state microwave devices. In 1986, he left Fairchild to establish Communications Research, a consulting firm. In 1995, he became an adjunct lecturer at Stanford University's Department of Engineering Economics Systems.

Having served as the chairman of IEEE Microwave Theory and Techniques Society's local chapters, Ivanek became the society's 1991 president. He became a fellow member of IEEE in 1993, for "his contributions to the development of fundamental-frequency/microwave oscillators and amplifiers and their application in analog and digital radio relay systems." Ivanek also co-authored and edited the book, Terrestrial Digital Microwave Communications (1989). He was the recipient of IEEE Third Millennium Medal.

Ivanek was married to Vojka Ivanek until her death in 2010; his wife worked at Stanford University as a project manager. Ivanek died on October 2, 2021, and was survived by his sons, Ivan and Željko Ivanek.
