= List of Revolution episodes =

Revolution is an American science fiction dramatic television series. The series was created by Eric Kripke and produced by J. J. Abrams and Bryan Burk. Jon Favreau directed the pilot episode. The series began on Monday September 17, 2012, at 10 pm. On October 2, 2012, NBC picked it up for a full season of 22 episodes, which was later reduced to 20 episodes. On April 26, 2013, the series was renewed by NBC for a second season of 22 episodes to air in a new time slot of Wednesdays at 8PM. The second season premiered on September 25, 2013.

On May 9, 2014, NBC announced that Revolution had been canceled before the remaining two episodes aired. In total, 42 episodes aired over two seasons.

== Series overview ==
Season	Episodes	Originally released	
Season	Episodes	First released	Last released
1	20	September 17, 2012	June 3, 2013
2	22	September 25, 2013	May 21, 2014

== Episodes ==
=== Season 1 (2012–13) ===
No. overall	No. in season	Title	Directed by	Written by	Original release date	Prod. code	US viewers (millions)
1	1	"Pilot"	Jon Favreau	Eric Kripke	September 17, 2012	296830	11.65
An American family (consisting of father Ben Matheson, children Charlie and Danny, who is asthmatic, and Ben's girlfriend Maggie, a doctor) struggles in a rural farming village in a world that has been devoid of electricity for fifteen years. Ben's wife and the children's mother, Rachel, disappeared years before while hunting and is believed by all to be dead. Unexpectedly, troops from the Monroe Militia commanded by Captain Tom Neville arrive while Charlie is out hunting, intending to take Ben Matheson prisoner, because General Monroe believes that Ben may know something about restoring the power. Before Ben is arrested, he secretly gives Aaron a mysterious pendant with directions to meet someone and instructions to keep it safe. However, a militia soldier fatally shoots Ben, who was protecting Danny. The soldiers take Danny prisoner and leave. Ben requests that Charlie go to Chicago and find Ben's brother Miles, whom Charlie has never heard of, to help rescue Danny. Aaron and Maggie accompany Charlie. Along the way they meet Nate, who helps them out of trouble. Upon reaching Chicago they find that The Grand has been converted to a tavern owned by Miles -- and Miles immediately identifies Nate as a soldier in the Monroe Militia. After the militia unsuccessfully tries to arrest Miles, who slaughters the troops trying to capture him with Charlie's help, the group sets off to find Danny. Meanwhile, Danny escapes and meets a woman named Grace, but the militia come to her house and recapture Danny. Grace is then shown using another pendant to power a computer and communicate with an unknown party. Flashbacks: Ben rushes home to warn his family that "It's happening." He urgently downloads something onto a USB pendant and tries to warn his brother Miles. Miles, who is in the Marines in South Carolina, is on his way back to base with his friend (and fellow Marine) "Bass" when he is contacted by Ben, but the blackout happens and interrupts the call. Miles and his friend return to base, and it is revealed that his friend "Bass" is Sebastian Monroe, later General and President of the Monroe Republic.
2	2	"Chained Heat"	Charles Beeson	Eric Kripke	September 24, 2012	2J7102	9.21
Charlie, Miles, Aaron, and Maggie continue to travel together looking for a way to find Danny. Miles insists that the group also needs his friend Nora, who they find has been captured by the militia. Charlie discovers Nate following her, captures him, and leaves him chained to a pole. As Charlie and Miles go to rescue Nora, Aaron shows Maggie the locket that Ben gave him. Danny continues his journey with the militia and is forced to watch as they execute a man for owning a gun and an American flag. Monroe tortures a member of a rebel group that are trying to bring back the United States. Nora escapes with Miles and Charlie and they find out that she had deliberately allowed herself to be captured to steal a sniper rifle that the militia had. They return to take the rifle and rescue the slaves she was held with, forcing Charlie to make her first kill. Nora tells Miles, much to his displeasure, that she has joined the resistance, who are trying to restore the United States. Meanwhile, a man stealthily shows up at Grace's house wearing a necklace just like hers, and Grace sends a frantic online message as she saw him that "Randall" was there. At the end, it is revealed that Gen. Monroe has been holding an uncooperative Rachel prisoner for years. Flashbacks: Rachel killed a man who was trying to steal the family's food while Ben was getting his work from the University of Chicago on their way out of the city.
3	3	"No Quarter"	Sanford Bookstaver	Monica Owusu-Breen	October 1, 2012	2J7103	8.32
Now fleeing from the Monroe Militia, Nora leads the gang back to camp, only to find many of the fighters are injured from an earlier trap set by the militia. Besieged, they try to dig a tunnel to escape, while the sniper rifle Nora stole keeps the militia at bay, but the tunnel finally collapses. They capture the militia's commander, Jeremy, to use as leverage, but Jeremy tells the rebels that his troops are under orders not to deal for him because of Miles' presence, and then, realizing that the others didn't know Miles' history, tells them that Miles was the founder and former commanding general of the Monroe Militia. Miles gives himself up to Jeremy in exchange for the militia allowing Charlie, Nora and the others to get away, but Charlie and Nora later ambush the Militia on a bridge to rescue Miles. Meanwhile, Aaron and Maggie go in search of the address that Ben gave Aaron, which turns out to be Grace's, but find her house empty. Aaron finds it strange that she still had a computer, but he can't make it work. Later, the pendant powers up unexpectedly, making Grace's CD player and Maggie's iPhone work for a moment, but then everything goes dark again. Finally, Danny gets physically abused by a soldier bent on revenge, but manages to even things out. Flashbacks: Some months after the blackout, Miles and Monroe go AWOL in search of Miles' family. While on the road, they find a couple who have been killed and some time later they come across two men who are attacking a man. Miles realizes they're the same men who killed the couple and kills them, much to Monroe's shock. The man they rescued is Jeremy.
4	4	"The Plague Dogs"	Felix Alcala	Anne Cofell Saunders	October 8, 2012	2J7104	8.01
Charlie and Nora meet back up with Aaron and Maggie. Unknown to them, Nate has escaped and continues to track Miles and Charlie. After running into a group of what appears to be stray dogs, Aaron is injured and Maggie is forced to kill one of the dogs. Miles sees and fights Nate and the group capture him. It is discovered that the dogs are the companions of a man who attacks the group and stabs Maggie in revenge for her killing one of his dogs. The group tries to save her, and Charlie is captured by the man. Miles frees Nate, and he and Miles kills the man and then went to find Charlie. Charlie has been tied to a chair with an elaborate, crossbow booby trap that will go off if the door to the room is opened. She escapes just as Nate and Miles enter the room. They return to Aaron, Maggie and Nora just as Maggie dies. Danny continues his journey with the Militia and they are forced to take shelter during a storm. Danny escapes and is quickly recaptured by Captain Neville. While taking shelter in a storm cellar, the roof falls in trapping Neville. Danny rescues him only to be put back into cuffs. Rachel continues to be a captive of the Militia and it appears she is being tortured for information on the blackout and Ben's involvement. Monroe taunts her with the knowledge that her son will arrive shortly. Flashbacks: Over several years, Maggie searches for a boat to return home so that she can be reunited with her family. However, all the boats have been lost or destroyed in the chaos following the blackout. As she is about to commit suicide, believing she will never see her family again, she is found by Ben, Charlie and Danny. In a different flashback, some years after the blackout, Rachel tearfully leaves her family "to look for supplies". For unknown reasons, she travels to the Monroe Militia where she is put into handcuffs almost immediately while a silent Miles in a militia uniform looks on.
5	5	"Soul Train"	Jon Cassar	Paul Grellong	October 15, 2012	2J7105	8.61
After catching up with Captain Neville and the Militia at Noblesville, Indiana the group discovers a working steam train being prepared to take Danny to Monroe at the Capital of the Monroe Republic in Philadelphia. Charlie and Miles set off in town to look for Danny and Charlie runs into Neville. Miles and Neville fight and Miles escapes. They return and discover Nora has gone to find the local resistance member and plans on blowing up the train. They are about to question "Nate" when he escapes and returns to Neville who moves Danny to the train and brings his departure forward and plans on leaving right away. Nora plants her bomb in a log and plans on it being set off in the furnace of the train but after seeing Danny on the train, has second thoughts and is then stabbed by a member of the resistance who wants revenge on the Militia for his wife. Nora is found by Charlie and Miles and they chase after the train and Miles manages to get rid of the bomb before it explodes. Charlie finds Danny and Neville on the train and they fight. Nate joins the fight and captures Charlie but helps her and Miles to escape. The train arrives where Monroe has been discussing border skirmishes with the Georgia Federation and Plains Nation. When he shows Rachel that Danny has arrived, she explains she was also part of the project that Ben was working on and she draws a picture of the Pendant, explaining that twelve of them exist and that they are the key to getting the power back on. It is revealed that "Nate" is in fact Tom Neville's son, Jason. Flashbacks: Tom Neville is shown to be a sensitive man who is reluctant to stand up for himself and instead takes out his anger on a punching bag. A few weeks after the blackout, his next-door neighbor attempts to loot the house and winds up trying to kill Tom. A shocked Jason, who had been taught by his father never to hit another man, watches as Tom kills the assailant in self-defense. As he recovers from the brutal reality of the post-electricity world, Tom insists that his young son should also learn how to defend himself.
6	6	"Sex and Drugs"	Steve Boyum	David Rambo	October 29, 2012	2J7106	7.90
Nora's condition worsens on the journey to Philadelphia; the party must find antibiotics in order to save her life. They are forced to turn to a drug kingpin named Drexel, who provides medical treatment, but not without a price. In return for the medicine, Charlie is tasked to assassinate the head of a neighboring family who has burned down Drexel's fields. Miles escapes from Drexel's compound to rescue Charlie and stops her just before she completes the task. Drexel is furious and makes Nora and Aaron fight each other to the death, but Aaron comes up with a ruse which leaves Drexel dead instead. Miles, Nora, Charlie and Aaron reunite and continue on the trek to Philadelphia. Flashbacks: Aaron recalls his experiences on the night of the blackout and in the months that followed. He and his wife succeeded in fleeing the city and joining up with another band of survivors. He leaves his wife with the rest of the group because he feels that he has nothing to contribute and cannot keep her safe.
7	7	"The Children's Crusade"	Charles Beeson	Matt Pitts	November 5, 2012	2J7107	7.34
Rachel and her son reunite and more information is dragged out of Rachel and her old "friends" before the black out. Charlie and the gang run into a group of self-governing children whose parents were killed by the militia about eight years ago. Miles feels responsible so he and Charlie devise a plan to get their leader, Peter, who was captured by the militia and sent to a militia ship. Though they want to do it alone, some of the children follow them, including Peter's brother Michael. Charlie lets the militia capture her and becomes a conscript. She escapes with Peter, but she is branded with the Monroe Militia symbol on her wrist. Miles and Nora also come to her aid, but Michael sneaks in, is captured, and used against them. Back at the lighthouse, where Aaron and the children are staying, Aaron's pendant randomly starts working, lighting up the lighthouse whose light distracts the crew of the ship while Charlie, Nora, and Miles kill the crew and free everyone. Back in Philadelphia, one of Rachel's old coworkers, Dr. Bradley, is captured because of his knowledge of the blackout thanks to the information Rachel provided. His daughter is hurt and captured, to force him to reveal all he knows about the blackout, including the location of his pendant. Miles asks Aaron for an explanation about the lighthouse and he is forced to reveal the existence and power of the pendant to Miles and Charlie. Meanwhile, it is revealed that Grace is being held captive by Randall. Flashbacks: Prior to the blackout, Ben was the head of a small startup technology company that Rachel and Grace worked for trying to create renewable free green energy, however their experiments have the opposite effect and instead cause a blackout in a localized area. Ben demonstrates this to Randall, the Assistant Secretary of the United States Department of Defense, Randall, seeing its potential as a weapon, promised them a contract to experiment further, but Rachel has reservations about the experiment being weaponized. Ben is insistent on accepting Randall's offer since the company will go bankrupt in less than a month if they do otherwise. Rachel still has doubts but the son she's expecting is gravely ill, and Randall offers her a chance to enter a maxed out medical program that may save him.
8	8	"Ties That Bind"	Guy Bee	David Rambo & Melissa Glenn	November 12, 2012	2J7108	7.10
When Nora encounters her sister, she must make a difficult choice between family and her promise to Charlie and Miles. However, when she learns that her sister is actually a bounty hunter and has made a secret deal with the militia to deliver Miles to them, she rejoins Miles' band to help them escape the ambush. Meanwhile, one of the most ruthless members of the militia, Strausser, is tracking Miles, Charlie and the gang. General Monroe hands Major Neville a stern warning. The locations of numerous pendants are revealed on a working computer screen in the unknown location where Randall is holding Grace prisoner. Flashbacks: Nora is shown to have been a teenager at the time of the blackout, as well as having a younger sister. Living in Texas shortly after the blackout, the two flee the home of their mother (who has been killed by a looter) for their father's home in Galveston, Texas. When they arrive, their father is nowhere to be found. They make a pact to always be there for each other.
9	9	"Kashmir"	Charles Beeson	Jim Barnes	November 19, 2012	2J7109	7.02
Charlie and the group get closer to rescuing Danny. With the aid of the rebels they use abandoned subway tunnels to get under the walls of a heavily defended Philadelphia. However, their efforts are impeded when they begin to hallucinate due to oxygen deprivation after a subway tunnel collapses. During his hallucinations it is revealed that not only did Miles attempt to assassinate Monroe, but also that Miles fears that if Monroe asked him to rejoin the Militia, he would abandon his friends and do so. When they found the way out, one of the rebel members kills all the rebels and reveals that he's a spy working for the Militia. While holding Miles hostage, Charlie kills a Militia spy. After killing him, Miles, Aaron, Nora, and Charlie walks out of the tunnel to Philadelphia. Meanwhile, Rachel, still under duress by Monroe, purports to be building a device to enhance the radius of the pendant devices, but Rachel's former colleague Dr. Jaffe reveals it to be a bomb. In order to maintain her usefulness to Monroe, Rachel kills Jaffe. Flashbacks: Unlike other episodes there are none for this episode. Instead the characters hallucinate. Miles hallucinates about seeing Monroe again and him asking him to rejoin the Republic, Nora about being bitten by a crocodile and Aaron sees his wife again. Charlie, having passed out since she hit her head on the stone floor due to a bullet graze, dreams that her journey so far has been just that, a dream.
10	10	"Nobody's Fault But Mine"	Frederick E. O. Toye	Monica Owusu-Breen & Matt Pitts	November 26, 2012	2J7110	8.54
Aaron, Nora, and Charlie are captured while hiding at the home of a friend of Miles after the four infiltrate Philadelphia. Miles takes Neville's wife Julia hostage and exchanges her for their safe return. Neville returns Aaron and Nora, and directs Miles to a defunct power plant where Charlie and Danny have been taken. Charlie reunites with her mother, Rachel, and her brother, Danny, at the plant. Rachel successfully completes the pendant amplifier before killing Strausser when he attempts to assault her. As Miles and Nora rescue Danny and Charlie, Miles faces off with Monroe to give the others time to escape. Monroe forgives Miles' treachery and pleads with him to come back and join his side, just as in Miles' hallucination. However, Miles refuses and fights with Monroe, and Miles then makes a quick exit when Monroe's soldiers appear. All of them escape after Aaron blasts a hole in the exterior wall with Nora's pipe bombs, but stop in their tracks when they hear a thundering sound and see a militia helicopter take flight using Rachel's amplifier and spool its minigun. Flashbacks: The life-long friendship of Miles Matheson and Sebastian Monroe is explored in a series of flashbacks working backward through time. Five years after the blackout, Miles and Sebastian are fighting in "The Trenton Campaign". Miles is injured and wants Sebastian to lead the troops. Sebastian doesn't leave his side and pledges his life to Miles. During the next flashback, two years before the blackout, Miles finds Sebastian, who is drinking and completely depressed near four freshly dug graves that belong to his parents and two sisters, who were recently killed in a car accident. Miles talks Sebastian out of suicide and into giving up his gun to him. During the next flashback, both of them are playing together as kids. The origin of the "M" insignia, the mark of the Monroe Republic, is revealed as a childhood symbol of unity standing for both "Matheson" and "Monroe".
11	11	"The Stand"	Steve Boyum	Anne Cofell Saunders & Paul Grellong	March 25, 2013	2J7111	7.03
Miles' and Charlie's group flee from a newly functional Militia helicopter by hiding in an abandoned diner. The diner is destroyed by rocket fire from the helicopter, but the group survived in the reinforced walk-in refrigerator. After a short discussion, the group decides to warn and aid the rebels in their fight against Monroe's forces. Rachel and Miles are in need of anti-air weaponry, so they seek out another scientist, John Sanborn (Leland Orser), who is in possession of both weapons and another pendant. While alone, Miles tells Rachel that he saw her dead body and would never have abandoned her had he known she was alive. Sanborn informs Rachel that Randall captured Grace and then incapacitates them before revealing that he also is working for Randall. Miles, however, frees himself, incapacitates John, and takes the weapons and the pendant along with Rachel. Charlie and the others go to the rebel headquarters to warn the rebels, but the mood is grim as Commander Ramsey, the rebel leader, believes they can no longer win, but Nora says that Miles will help. Neville and his son Jason (formerly known as Nate) overlook a massacred rebel camp, while Jason voices his disapproval of Monroe's methods, because the rebels don't stand a chance. They eventually find the rebel headquarters and spot Charlie among many people there. Jason refuses to order an air strike, and he and Neville come to blows, with Neville beating him up and telling him to never come home. Neville then orders the air strike and tells Monroe that Jason is dead. Jason proceeds to warn Charlie, who is grateful but says he can't come with her. Monroe's helicopters arrive and the rebels take many casualties before Miles and Rachel arrive with surface-to-air rocket launchers. Miles aims his rocket launcher but is knocked out by the concussion from a missile. Danny then takes the rocket launcher and fires at the helicopter containing the amplifier, the source of power for both Militia helicopters. As the helicopters fall, Danny is killed by stray bullets to his chest. Later, Rachel cuts into Danny's body and pulls out a device with a flashing LED. Earlier, Grace is revealed to be working under duress for Randall to get the elevators working so Randall could go to Level 12 of the unknown location. Later, Randall Flynn and John Sanborn arrive in Philadelphia by car that works via pendant and offer their help to the Monroe Militia. Flashbacks: Rachel reasures a young Danny that she isn't going anywhere as he is prepped for an experimental procedure, but she expresses her doubts regarding the procedure to Ben. He, however reminds her that nothing else has worked and this is their only option.
12	12	"Ghosts"	Miguel Sapochnik	David Rambo & Melissa Glenn	April 1, 2013	2J7112	6.36
After Danny's sacrifice, Miles and Nora decide to go in search of his old top officers, the ones who supported his assassination attempt on Monroe, starting by Jim Hudson. He tells the rebels that Jim could help train them into real soldiers. Meanwhile, Rachel, Charlie and Aaron go to the rebels' Eco base, an old hospital. Things between Rachel and Charlie are strained, since Charlie is cold to her mother. Randall reveals that he can activate the pendants remotely to track them, and he and Monroe seal an uneasy alliance. After Rachel sees the pendants activate on their own, she realizes that Randall is tracking them, and she destroys the pendants so they cannot be tracked or used. Someone sees Miles and Nora and sells the information to a militia kill squad. Miles and Nora find Jim living under an assumed name as a happily-married town librarian. He's not happy to see Miles again and he refuses to go back. With Eco base under attack by Randall and militia troops, Rachel reveals that Randall was her boss at the United States Department of Defense (DOD), while Randall tells her through a megaphone that he needs her for her scientific knowledge. The militia kill squad arrives in Jim's town, but Miles, Jim and Nora manage to kill them. Randall captures Rachel and reveals to her that his intention is to restore power, but only in the hands of a chosen few, to prevent a return to the wars of the past. Charlie rescues Rachel. The militia's captain tries to kill Jim's wife. He saves her, but she's shocked by his background and repudiates him. Jim tells Miles he has destroyed his life again, but agrees to go with him. They arrive at the rebel camp in time to see Charlie apologize to her mother, and the two hug. Aaron asks Rachel for the truth and she agrees to tell him everything, starting with a place called "The Tower". Flashbacks: One year before the Blackout, an Army officer comes to tell Randall and his wife that their son has been killed in Afghanistan. One month before the Blackout, at the DOD, Randall pushes to activate the program to fight the Taliban, despite Rachel and Ben's concerns. The night of the blackout, Randall orders the activation of the Tower.
13	13	"The Song Remains the Same"	John F. Showalter	Monica Owusu-Breen & Matt Pitts	April 8, 2013	2J7113	6.07
Rachel tells Aaron that the global power outage was caused by quadrillions of microscopic programmable nanites that execute only two commands: absorb power and replicate. Although Rachel does not know how the nanites went out of control, she tells Aaron that the nanites could be shut off from the Tower, which is in Colorado. Neville faces danger and hard choices as Randall doubts his competence, Monroe doubts his loyalty, he and Julia have to pretend that Jason was killed, and his convoy is ambushed by the rebels led by Miles, resulting in his capture and torture. Charlie stops Rachel from murdering Neville in revenge for Danny's death. Left alone, Rachel and Miles then discuss Charlie and renew their romantic attraction. After mistakenly revealing his destination to Jason, who pretended to free him, Neville kills two rebels and escapes. He then makes his way to Philadelphia and flees with Julia before Monroe learns of his blunder. Using Neville's information, the rebels find that Randall has built a nuclear weapon, which Randall takes back to Philadelphia by car using the pendants. Rachel and Charlie begin slowly patching their relationship, only to be pulled apart again as Rachel embarks on a quest to make amends for her past actions and restore the power, taking Aaron with her on a "suicide mission" to the Tower.
14	14	"The Night the Lights Went Out in Georgia"	Nick Copus	Paul Grellong	April 22, 2013	2J7114	5.88
Paranoia strikes Monroe deeply as Neville disappears and word reaches him that Jason is with the rebels. Miles, Charlie and Nora infiltrate the Georgia Federation to chase the nuclear device, which Monroe has had Miles' former protege Alec plant in Atlanta, the federation's capital. During a battle, Alec tells Charlie to ask Miles what he did to Rachel. Monroe uses a helicopter to drop leaflets over Atlanta demanding unconditional surrender. Miles is captured by Georgia police and turns out to have had a personal relationship with Georgia Federation president Kelly Foster, who ultimately frees him to find Alec. Miles kills Alec just as Monroe orders Alec to detonate the nuke. Meanwhile, Rachel and Aaron locate her former co-worker Dr. Jane Warren (Kate Burton), who reveals that the nanites kept Danny and keep her partner Beth alive through their cancer-eating abilities. Jane believes that if Rachel shuts down the nanites and restore the power, Beth will die. However, at Beth's urging, she provides Rachel with her technical journal, which has information that will permit Rachel to turn off the nanites if she reaches the Tower. After the nuclear weapon has been disarmed, Charlie asks Miles about Rachel, and Miles answers only that he hurts anyone close to him. President Foster declares war on the Monroe Republic and offers Miles command of an army made up of 200 soldiers from the Georgia Federation, to help the rebels open a second front within the Monroe Republic. Flashbacks: Seven years after the blackout, Miles gives Alec a "lucky" knife from Miles' father and grandfather, which he tells Alec to pass along to his own son, when he has one. Nine years after the blackout, Miles has his troops turn Alec over to Texas after Alec's attempt to assassinate the Texas leader failed and the leader could identify Alec.
15	15	"Home"	Jon Cassar	David Rambo	April 29, 2013	2J7115	5.49
Miles is now in command of the combined rebel forces and 200 Georgian troops. His capture of three southern outposts of the Monroe Republic draws the attention of Monroe, who reminds Jeremy that the militia started with a few small victories. Monroe, Jeremy, and several troops travel by helicopter to Miles' and Monroe's home town and round up all the citizens, including Emma (Annie Wersching), Miles' former fiancée and Bass Monroe's former lover, and Monroe sends a runner to Miles stating that he will execute everyone if Miles does not come alone and surrender. Although Miles sneaks away from camp at night, he is later followed by Charlie, Nora, Jim Hudson and some Georgian soldiers. In the battle that ensues, Emma tells Bass that she gave birth to his son while he and Miles were away in boot camp, but she is then killed by a Georgian officer trying to shoot Monroe. Miles shoots and kills the Georgian officer for killing Emma. Jeremy leads a wounded Monroe back to the helicopters. Meanwhile. Aaron and Rachel cross the Mississippi River into the Plains Nation on their way to The Tower. The pair stop in La Grange, Missouri , where Rachel tries to decipher the diagrams in Jane's journal. She declines help from Aaron, who has two technical doctorates from MIT, and asks him instead to shop for supplies. While doing so, Aaron sees his wife, Priscilla whom he abandoned in the months right after the black-out, but she acts cold and distant. Priscilla tells Aaron that she has moved on, but Aaron believes her actions indicated that she was in trouble. He ultimately finds that she was being held by a bounty hunter and rescues her (with her help). She tells him that she has remarried and her family is in Texas; the Monroe Republic put a bounty on her after she killed an official while defending her eleven-year-old daughter. They say goodbye. President Foster decides to appoint a former militia officer who has defected to her side as her new liaison to Miles: Tom Neville. Flashbacks: Teenage Miles, his fiancée Emma, and his friend Bass form a threesome in town just before Bass and Miles have to report after enlisting. While Miles is passed out drunk, Emma and Bass make love.
16	16	"The Love Boat"	Charles Beeson	Melissa Glenn	May 6, 2013	2J7116	6.06
Neville and Miles work together, in a capacity unknown to the rest of the gang. In secret, they take control of a scientist named Dr. Ethan Camp (Timothy Busfield), via his wife and daughter, Bonnie, from the Monroe Republic, intending to hand him over to the Georgia Federation to weaponize anthrax. Charlie, Nora and Jason work against them and attempt to free Dr. Camp, only to be ambushed by a stationed group of Monroe's Militiamen. During the gunfight, Miles decided to help them escape with Dr. Camp's family, with Charlie thanking him. After they escape, Neville is furious at Miles for his action, but Miles says that they're better him, much to Neville's unhappiness. Meanwhile, Rachel and Aaron, in their desperate attempt to find food, steal some from a local Plains Nation settlement while on their journey to The Tower, resulting in three men from the settlement being killed trying to retrieve it. Rachel's leg is broken during their escape, and it is revealed that Aaron pioneered a software application while he was a student at MIT, therefore he must be the one to go to The Tower. It was also revealed that this software and Aaron's profile was in a journal owned by Dr. Jane Warren, and was most likely used by Randall Flynn when beginning his project at The Tower. The extent or the purpose of this software use is currently unknown. Grace Beaumont cracks into the elevator using a computer within The Tower, and a man set to guard her is killed while going to level 12. The show ends with Grace coming face-to-face with the killer.
17	17	"The Longest Day"	Steve Boyum	Anne Cofell Saunders	May 13, 2013	2J7117	5.51
The Rebel and Georgia Federation Alliance is attacked by the Monroe Republic, reducing their numbers from 300 men to 30. This prompts President Foster (Leslie Hope) to tell Miles that either he comes up with a plan, or she will surrender to Monroe in order to save her people. During the attack on the Rebel/Georgia Alliance, Jason is critically injured, but is carried to safety by his father, Major Neville. Monroe kills Jeremy Baker (Mark Pellegrino) believing him to behind an assassination attempt made against him. It is later revealed that Baker had nothing to do with this assassination attempt, strengthening Baker's statement that he made before he was killed, pointing out that the only reason all of Monroe's friends betray him (including Major Neville and Miles) is because his delusions, paranoia, and barbaric nature drive them away. Rachel has Aaron reprogram the flashing LED, which she explains to be first-generation nanotechnology, that she had removed from Danny after his death, and inserted it into her leg to repair the bone and tissues. When Rachel's leg is healed, a group from the settlement saw how her leg was healed and force them to heal one of the group's son, who has been injured and has infection in his wounds. They agree to help the boy, but when they arrive at the electronics store where Rachel's leg was healed, Rachel knocks the boy's father out. Rachel then says that she has to go the Tower first because she has to restore the world's electricity so that the opposing nations could overthrow Monroe and end his ongoing war. She also reveals that she wants revenge on Monroe for killing her son, and ruining her life. At the end of the episode, Jason and Charlie are witnessed by Tom, kissing in a hospital room within the Georgia Federation Presidential House. Nora is captured by the Monroe forces and delivered to Monroe, where it is revealed that they knew each other previously. Flashbacks: More is shown into the history between Miles and Rachel, the latter first arriving at the Monroe Republic to give her family time to escape Miles. She tricks Miles into thinking that she can turn the power back on herself, and that she knew more about the blackout than her then husband, Ben Matheson. It is revealed that Rachel had an affair with Miles and that she deeply regretted it.
18	18	"Clue"	Helen Shaver	Story by : Oanh Ly; Teleplay by : Paul Grellong & Oanh Ly	May 20, 2013	2J7118	5.64
The episode begins with Nora refusing a peaceful proposition from Monroe, requesting information on Miles' whereabouts. As a result, over the next 21 days, she is tortured repeatedly until she finally reveals the locations of Miles, Neville and Charlie. John Sanborn, who attacked Miles and Rachel, rescues Nora from the Militia Prison, after injecting her with a substance which causes hallucinations and paranoia. He also steals a pendant and amplifier for the rebels to use. He tells Miles he did so because he didn't want to carry out his orders of killing her and doesn't want to be responsible for people's death. Subsequently, Nora reveals to Miles that she told Monroe everything. Miles, Nora, Jason, Neville, Charlie, Sanborn, and Hudson board a helicopter bound for The Tower, stopping on the way to siphon fuel from vehicles abandoned in an airstrip. During this stop, the pilot of the helicopter and another rebel, Ramsay, were murdered with an X on their throats from a knife, leading to speculation that the murders were carried out by members of the Plains Nation. Charlie, however, points out that it cannot be a local of the area who did it because there is no food or water nearby. It is also confirmed by Ramsay that it was one of the group who did it, and eyes immediately turn to Jason, as he was seen by Charlie speaking to a member of the Monroe Militia back in Atlanta. Jason attempts to flee with Miles in pursuit. Sanborn quickly notices the knife used to murder the two rebels bore the stamp of Annapolis and follows. He tells Miles that it was Hudson who committed the murders, and then he is shot by Hudson himself. Hudson then reveals that Monroe has his wife, and that he was told by the Militia men that he had to kill Miles, Neville, Ramsay, and Sanborn. Hudson and Miles fight, with Hudson gaining the upper hand, but ultimately is shot dead by Jason. Monroe decides that Flynn is no longer of any use, and tells his forces to kill him. Flynn then discloses information about The Tower, including that it holds weapons which make his helicopters seem like toys. This makes Monroe lead an operation to retrieve this weaponry, but their path is blocked by an invading force within The Tower, which have locked Flynn out of the system, preventing him from gaining access to the building. Rachel and Aaron get closer to The Tower. Realizing that The Tower is now surrounded by Militia, Rachel makes the decision that she will fulfill her personal mission of killing Monroe at nightfall, leaving the rest of the Militia to fight for leadership, subsequently leaving Aaron with the chance of approaching the door to The Tower with the override codes. Rachel walks into Monroe's tent and pulls the pin on a grenade in her hands. Monroe and his men, holding guns, try to talk Rachel down and the episode ends with Rachel releasing the lever on the grenade.
19	19	"Children of Men"	Frederick E. O. Toye	David Rambo & Jim Barnes	May 27, 2013	2J7119	6.32
Rachel unpins the grenade in Monroe's tent, but one of Monroe's bodyguards pushes her out of the way. Another militia soldier tackles Rachel and throws the grenade outside just in time. Aaron witnesses Rachel being led in chains, eliminating his chance to get into the Tower. Rachel is allowed access into the Tower, much to the astonishment of Randall. The group inside the Tower witnesses Monroe's entry as the leader, named Dan Jenkins, orders his men to take their weapons to fight Monroe. ( Dan Jenkins is the same man who was the Tower's commander and who took Randall's order to activate the machine that caused the blackout). Miles lands the helicopter four miles from the Tower On his groups hike to the entrance of the Tower, they run into Aaron. Aaron tells Miles that there is a way into the Tower, but they have to find a way around Monroe's troops. Inside the Tower, Randall shows Monroe the control room, where the U.S. government's satellites still have live feeds of the entire planet. According to Randall, the Tower has the capacity to do anything and is impervious to everything, including the Blackout. However, they first need to go to Level 12. Rachel is shocked when Randall reveals this, but Monroe and his troops enter the elevator, ready to witness the entirety of the Tower's potential. Monroe and his group take the elevator to Level 12, but it stops at Level 11. Monroe's men step out of the elevator, but an alarm sounds and Jenkin's men, using superior coil gun weaponry, begin to take down Monroe's men. Rachel runs for cover in a room that was a vice-presidential bunker, but Monroe follows and pins her, demanding to know who the attackers are. Outside, Tom Neville and Jason take out the Militia encampment's power source with grenades. Aaron and Miles rush to open the doors of the Tower as Monroe's men descend on them. However, only Miles, Charlie, Nora, and Aaron can get in, leaving Jason and Neville outside when the door shuts. The Militia captures Jason and Neville, but they manage to plot a revolt with the assistance of the local commanders they meet during interrogation. At the Tower, Rachel tells Monroe that he killed her son and her son's death was his fault, but Monroe tells her that he doesn't know how he got out of control and reveals to Rachel that he also has a son, too. Meanwhile, Miles, Charlie, Nora, and Aaron are in the battle with the attackers. Monroe decided to help Rachel save Charlie, but he has to kill Miles. During the fight, Miles and Nora are separated from Charlie and Aaron, and Monroe separated from Rachel, with Miles face to face with Monroe. Rachel, Charlie, and Aaron are captured by the attackers and are led to a place where there are families. They grow their own food and live to protect the Tower, especially Level 12. Rachel realizes that the inhabitants at the Tower are the workers and scientists. Grace Beaumont and Dan Jenkins burn Doctor Warren's journal in order to prevent Rachel and Aaron from turning the lights back on. This is because there are two possible results of deactivating the nanites. It could turn the lights back on, or it could set the world on fire. Flashbacks: One week before the Blackout: we see Ben working on something for Randall. Ben and Rachel are having disagreements due to the stress of the project. Rachel wants to spend time apart after the project is launched. Four months after the blackout: We see Ben turning on the Pendant, which enables him to turn on a computer that he uses to contact others. Grace responds to Ben on the computer as Rachel has a suicidal breakdown over the blood on their hands. Ben encourages her to stay strong for the children.
20	20	"The Dark Tower"	Charles Beeson	Story by : Eric Kripke; Teleplay by : Eric Kripke & Paul Grellong	June 3, 2013	2J7120	6.17
During the fight between Monroe and Miles, they are attacked by the Tower's inhabitants, and Miles is separated from Nora when he and Monroe are flown away out of the Tower. After waking up outside of the Tower, Miles fights Monroe and beats him. When Miles is about to leave him, Monroe reveals to Miles that everything he has ever done has been for Miles, as he has always followed him to have his back. In addition, he states that the war between him and Miles began when Miles attempted to kill him. Miles reveals that he could never kill Monroe as he still considers him his brother. After that, Monroe is captured by his own men. Meanwhile, Aaron discovers that his code from MIT was sold to the Department of Defense, and was used for the Tower's operating system, much to his shock. Later, Miles rescues Monroe from the new Monroe Republic, headed by Tom Neville, who led a revolt against Monroe. Miles tells Monroe to run, while he enters the Tower. Meanwhile, Charlie, Rachel, and Aaron escape their way to Level 12, and later reunited with Nora. Nora is shot in the abdomen while creating a way for Rachel, Charlie, and Aaron to reach Level 12, Charlie stays with Nora while Rachel and Aaron makes their way to Level 12. Miles is reunited with Charlie and Nora, who later bled to death and subsequently dying in Miles' arms. While heading down to Level 12, Aaron and Rachel are confronted by Neville and his Militia, who entered the Tower, first. It is later revealed that Neville decided to become the leader of the Monroe Republic, himself. Neville orders them to surrender, but Miles and Charlie helps them escape. After arriving at Level 12 Aaron runs the shutdown command for the nanites, re-instating electric power worldwide. As the power is re-instated, President Foster of the Georgia Federation orders military strikes on Philadelphia, and lightning begins to strike the surface of the Earth at a rapid rate. However, the victory is short-lived as Randall appears and reveals he has been attempting to gain access to Level 12 for a long time, not to turn the power back on for everybody, but for the purpose of sending out ICBMs aimed at Atlanta and Philadelphia in order to reunite the states into one entity, quoting Lincoln's famous line, "A house divided against itself cannot stand." Randall then proceeds to say that everything he did was so "this great nation shall not perish." When Rachel asks him why he is doing this, Randall smiles, calls himself a Patriot, and then shoots himself in the head. At the end, the camera shows a room with an American flag, where someone is turning a lamp on and off. Another person enters the room saying that Flynn has succeeded in his mission, and that, "It's time to go home, Mr. President." The camera zooms out and the location is a U.S. Colony at Guantánamo Bay, where the President of the United States has presumably been hiding for the past 15 years, waiting for Flynn to fulfill his mission. Flashbacks: Ten years after the blackout, Miles and Bass are in a restaurant reminiscing about their pasts. A rebel force attacks the restaurant, attempting to assassinate them. Bass retaliates by ordering the killing of the would-be assassin, along with his wife and children. This is the key factor that resulted in Nora and Miles defecting from the Monroe Republic.

=== Season 2 (2013–14) ===
No. overall	No. in season	Title	Directed by	Written by	Original release date	Prod. code	US viewers (millions)
21	1	"Born in the U.S.A."	Steve Boyum	Eric Kripke	September 25, 2013	2J7701	6.81
Set six months after the events of Season 1, the episode is broken into three storylines. Miles, Aaron, and Rachel have settled into life in the Texas town of Willoughby. Rachel was brought to the town in emotional shock after the events of the Tower. As hoped, her father, Gene Porter, is still alive and living in the town, and is willing to help Rachel recover. It is confirmed that the nuclear missiles bound for Atlanta and Philadelphia struck their targets, creating widespread devastation and throwing both the Monroe Republic and the Georgia Federation into disarray. Meanwhile, in a refugee camp outside of Savannah, Georgia, Neville and Jason desperately search for Julia, Neville’s wife. They witness the return of the U.S. Government, and a group calling themselves "The Patriots". One of the Patriots, Secretary Justine Allenford, gives a speech about how the U.S. Government is back to help its people, but Neville becomes suspicious. He believes that the Patriots were behind the nuclear bombings on Atlanta and Philadelphia. Meanwhile, Charlie is hunting for Monroe in the Plains Nation, and comes upon him pit fighting in a small town. She tries to assassinate him but misses and witnesses Monroe abducted by two men. The episode concludes with an attack on Willoughby by a warrior clan from the Plains Nation. In the attack, Miles is captured and brought before the tribe’s leader, Titus Andover. Aaron is killed protecting his girlfriend, but unexpectedly opens his eyes in the final moments of the episode. Flashback: Six months before, Miles, Aaron and Charlie find Gene, Rachel's dad and Charlie's grandfather. Rachel is clearly unwell. Two months later, Charlie leaves and says goodbye to Miles.
22	2	"There Will Be Blood"	Phil Sgriccia	Paul Grellong	October 2, 2013	2J7702	5.46
Aaron wakes up after being dead for hours. Rachel and Gene discover that he's alive, much to their shock. Aaron begins to believe that the nanites were responsible for bringing him back to life. Meanwhile, Miles is held captive by Titus Andover and his tribe members. The holding area contains a red door through which prisoners are taken and do not return. The town discovers that the sheriff is dead and Miles is being held captive. Rachel tries to organize a rescue for Miles, but no one agrees to join her, eventually leading her to try to rescue him on her own. While Rachel is leaving town, Gene and the others join her. Miles tries to escape, but gets caught instead. He is brought before Titus Andover who, after revealing his history, smashes Miles' right hand with a hammer. It is revealed later that a key member of Titus’ group is a Patriot. Back at Willoughby, Aaron reveals to his girlfriend Cynthia the truth behind the blackout and his resurrection. Meanwhile, Charlie is captured by Monroe’s abductors and discovers they are contracted by the Patriots. The lead, Adam, notes that the Patriots need Monroe alive. The pair let Charlie go and ride off with Monroe, only to have Monroe escape. Charlie manages to save Adam but not his partner. In Savannah, Neville organizes an assassination attempt on Allenford, but turns on the would-be assassin to further his goal of infiltrating the Patriots. At the tent, Allenford allows Neville to join the Patriots. The episode closes as Miles is brought behind the red door where Titus is next to a sick woman who is receiving a blood transfusion from a dead man lying on a table nearby. Flashback: During the incident at the Tower, Miles, Charlie, Rachel and Aaron try to stop the nuclear missiles from hitting Atlanta and Philadelphia, but fail when the computer crashes. Neville and the Monroe Militia burst in and order them to surrender, but the lights go out. Then the room begins to explode.
23	3	"Love Story"	Helen Shaver	David Rambo	October 9, 2013	2J7703	5.45
Miles is brought behind the red door and Titus explains that his wife has diabetes and must be given new blood in order to survive. Titus' men strap Miles down to the cart and begin draining his blood. Rachel appears and rescues Miles. They escape back to Willoughby, taking Titus' wife, Jessica, with them. The war tribe advances on the town, but Miles threatens to kill Jessica if they attack. A warrior, previously seen working for the Patriots, tries to get Titus to back down but Titus resists. In the house, Jessica begs Rachel not to give her back to Titus because she's afraid of him. Miles offers himself to Titus in exchange for the safety of the town residents. Titus agrees, but also sends in a spy to check on his wife. The spy and Rachel discover she has killed herself rather than return to Titus. As the last wagon out of town is leaving, Titus discovers the deception, and his tribe begins to brutally attack the town. Meanwhile, in the Savannah Refugee Camp, Neville tells Jason they are now Patriots working for the U.S. Government, until they "climb to the top and kill them all." He burns his wife's picture. Upon returning to their tent at the end of the day, they are attacked and beaten unconscious. After waking, they are questioned by the Patriots. The group reveals they know Neville’s true identity. He talks his way into release after Allenford intervenes, but Jason will not be released. In the Plains Nation, Adam and Charlie catch up to their wagon only to be ambushed by Monroe who knocks out Adam. Monroe reveals to Charlie that Rachel is wanted by the Patriots for crimes against the U.S. Government. Monroe tells Charlie that he'll help her and her family, but she refuses and walks away. Back at Willoughby, the town is saved when the Patriots, wielding assault rifles, kill all the attackers. As Titus cries over his wife's body, one of the tribe members throws a bag over his head, capturing him. Meanwhile, Miles sees the Patriots marching into the town, killing all the tribesmen, and setting up an American flag, taking control of the town. Rachel lies critically injured from an arrow, but is helped by the Patriots.
24	4	"Patriot Games"	Charles Beeson	Story by : Anne Cofell Saunders; Teleplay by : Anne Cofell Saunders & Paul Grellong	October 16, 2013	2J7704	5.42
In Pottsboro, North Texas, Charlie finds herself in trouble in a bar. Monroe arrives and kills everyone in the bar to rescue her. Charlie wakes up in the middle of a thunderstorm with Monroe. He tells Charlie he is doing this as a show of faith. Rachel awakens and leaves the house in search of Miles and her father. The town has been overtaken by the Patriots. Miles, Aaron, and Rachel are suspicious of the Patriots' role in recent events and set about investigating. Rachel breaks into the Patriots' office, but gets caught and is removed. Aaron experiences sudden pain, disorientation, and a disturbing dream. Miles follows a lead and investigates Titus' compound only to discover it seemingly deserted and Titus rifling through paper. Upon discovery, Titus acts crazy and accuses the Patriots of being "unhuman". After blaming Miles for his wife’s death, Titus fights Miles and is killed. Rachel tells her friend, Ken, everything that has happened to this point. As they visit Ken’s wine cellar, Rachel notices the same eye-and-pyramid symbol the Patriots use and begins to back away. She tries to run, but is captured. Ken reveals that he worked for the Patriots for seven years. She breaks free of her bonds just in time to stab him and buries him. In Savannah, Neville is threatened by another Patriot. He notices needle marks on the officer's arm and bribes a prostitute for access to the officer at a local brothel/drug house. He offers the officer a deal - he gets promoted and told where Jason is. The officer agrees, but when he cannot tell Neville where Jason is, Neville injects an overdose into him. Neville is promoted in place of the officer, who Secretary Allenford says that has been transferred to another camp. Meanwhile, Miles searches the local train yard and discovers a train car filled with prisoners from Titus’ clan. Miles recognizes one of the soldiers in the yard as Titus' advisor. Miles is discovered spying and attempts to flee, only to be cornered. Aaron's dreams and Miles' reality somehow overlap and cause the officers to catch on fire, allowing Miles to escape. Miles and Rachel discuss what happened, the conversation ending with Miles declaring that every occupation needs a resistance. The last scene is Charlie and Monroe on a wagon riding towards Willoughby.
25	5	"One Riot, One Ranger"	Frederick E. O. Toye	David Rambo & Ben Edlund	October 23, 2013	2J7705	5.04
In Willoughby, Texas, as Miles and Rachel discuss Ken's death, Aaron knocks on their door to confront Miles about the situation at the rail road. Aaron says he is pretty sure he caused the men to catch fire, and Rachel thinks it might be the nanotech. Shortly after, Monroe, Charlie and a contingent of Texas Rangers arrive in town. After pointing guns at each other, the Rangers and Patriots lower their weapons. However, the Patriots make efforts to hide their activities from the Rangers. Miles contacts the lead Ranger, Fry, whom he tried to kill when he was in the Monroe army, as he is their best shot at starting a war with the Patriots. Fry demands proof to take back, otherwise Texas will sign a treaty with the Patriots. Charlie and Monroe make contact with Miles and aid him in the capture of the Patriot soldier who was working with Titus. As they prepare to question him at a hidden location, Aaron and Rachel arrive due to a vision Aaron had of the location. As they hide and the Ranger arrives, Miles discovers the soldier committed suicide with a cyanide tooth. Monroe kills Fry in order to frame the Patriots as a way to start the war. In the Savannah Refugee Camp, a wagon is mobbed by desperate people who want to board. Neville speaks with Allenford, who tells him she is being called to D.C. and he is to accompany her as her security force. Along the way, they are ambushed by Patriots, who try to assassinate Allenford. Neville and Allenford escape, although Allenford is wounded. When they stop to rest, Allenford reveals that the wagon was actually taking people to reprogramming centers, the same one where Neville's son is now. She tells Neville that the Patriots are brainwashing innocent people to become members. She also knows that the Patriots were sent to kill her, in order to silence her for objecting to them. After Neville begins to leave her to die from her wounds, she bargains to take him there if he helps her. Flashback: Cynthia interviews Aaron about being a teacher, and although he is qualified, she believes Aaron's unhappiness will upset the children. Later, working as a teacher, he is given a gag gift by Cynthia as her husband walks in. Aaron later runs into her husband sleeping with another woman in a car. After the husband threatens Aaron as he returns to the other woman, Aaron unintentionally sets the car on fire, killing them both, similar to the soldiers in a previous episode. He was not aware that he created the fire until now.
26	6	"Dead Man Walking"	Steve Boyum	Story by : Trey Callaway; Teleplay by : Trey Callaway & Paul Grellong	October 30, 2013	2J7706	4.87
Miles and Monroe set about making the ranger look like he was killed by the Patriots, sinking his body in the river. The Texas Rangers follow Fry's tracks to the old warehouse and find a gun casing from a Patriot gun. Miles catches Monroe with a Patriot body and Monroe gives him information that the Patriot disclosed before Monroe killed him. Monroe is sitting in a building when someone throws in a stun grenade. He leaves the building to find a number of Patriots with their guns pointed at him, and he is taken into custody. Instead of the intended war, the Texas Rangers and the Patriots are working together. They present Monroe to the public and say he will not live to see another sunrise if he is found guilty of his crimes at an immediate trial. Reporters and old flash cameras are there to capture the moment. Aaron meets Bonnie Webster (Alanna Ubach), who has entered the town with the Texas Rangers. Miles tells Charlie they have to get Monroe out. At night, Miles and Charlie sneak along the top of a building. They see Monroe being moved to a vault in the bank and Miles confronts Rachel about tipping off the Rangers and Patriots that there was going to be a jailbreak. Rachel confesses to telling them. Charlie and Rachel have a confrontation: Rachel tells her she cannot bear to lose another child, but Charlie says Monroe saved her life. In the courtroom, Monroe is sentenced to death. Monroe's last request is to see Miles. Monroe asks Miles to shake his hand and say goodbye and to find his son by Emma. Miles tells Monroe he hid his son from him, much to his shock. At midnight, Monroe is given the injection by Gene Porter and dies. Miles is broken by the loss of Monroe and tries to drink his pain away. Allenford tells Neville the direction of the camp his son is being held in, then refuses to go any farther. Neville tells her he is not letting her go until he lays eyes on his son. They find dead bodies ripped apart, and Allenford reveals it is the work of the Patriots' bootcamp. Soldiers fire on them and they run. The main attacker turns out to be Jason, who does not hesitate as he attempts to kill his father. Jason and his group storm through hallways of the warehouse and Jason's vision is blurry. Allenford says that Neville's son is no longer his son. She knows this because her own son has been put through this program in Cuba, and her husband is a high ranking Patriot who puts country before family. Neville kills the other two with Jason and holds Jason at gunpoint. Jason beats up Neville and is trying to killing him when Allenford hits him over the head, knocking him unconscious. Rachel stands over Monroe's grave and begins digging. Flashback: Three years after the Blackout, Miles and Monroe walk through a tent camp, discussing stealing food from a nearby camp. Miles suggests forming an army. Monroe enters one of the tents to greet his girlfriend, Shelly, who is pregnant with his child. In the following scene, Shelly is giving birth when things goes wrong. Miles and Neville bring water and towels but when they arrive, Monroe exits the tent sobbing, his hands covered in blood. Later, Monroe is seen celebrating with others about the success of the raid on the camp. Miles asks him if there were any casualties in which he replies that Miles means if there were any survivors. This shows that losing his girlfriend and unborn child broke Monroe and changed him into what he became.
27	7	"The Patriot Act"	Omar Madha	Anne Cofell Saunders & Matt Pitts	November 6, 2013	2J7707	5.21
Monroe is dug out of his grave by Rachel, having been heavily drugged to make him appear dead. He rehabilitates in a farmhouse outside of town. Dr. Horn, science adviser to the Patriots, arrives, having been drawn by news of Rachel's presence and strange happenings that have occurred since her arrival. With the help of Gene, Dr. Horn learns that Aaron was the cause of the strange happenings, including the spontaneous combustion of two soldiers. Miles and company are aware of Dr. Horn's interest in Aaron and conspire to help him escape town. Aaron won't leave town without his girlfriend, who ultimately agrees to come with him. Gene agrees to help Aaron escape, but is coerced by the Patriots into setting up his capture. On a hunch, Miles observes Gene aiding the Patriots, which devastates Rachel. When Aaron fails to arrive at the rendezvous, the Patriots realize Gene's cover is blown. They lock down the town and aggressively search house to house. Aaron and company make for a sewer line that leads out of town and barely escape. At the end of the tunnel, they are confronted by Patriot soldiers, but are suddenly helped by Monroe. However, in the fighting, Aaron's girlfriend is attacked by a soldier, triggering another nanotech attack by Aaron. As they walk to safety with Monroe, Aaron's girlfriend is terrified of him. Meanwhile, somewhere on the east coast, Neville and Allenford are hiding out as Jason wakes up. The drugs are being flushed out of his system, but Allen still questions his trustworthiness. After getting ambushed by Patriot cadets, Jason seems to betray both Neville and Allenford, but instead kills their attackers and offers the knife he used to his father. Allenford wants to try to reclaim her son in Cincinnati after Jason helps, but she is unexpectedly drugged by Neville. She awakens in handcuffs, and is questioned by Neville about the location of her husband. Flashback: Gene's cooperation with the Patriots is shown to stem from a Cholera outbreak that killed his wife. A member of the Patriots offers him medicine to save the remaining victims. The officer continues to supply the town with medicine in exchange for Gene's cooperation, which devolves into assistance with torture. Gene becomes disgusted at his role, and questions the motives of the Patriots, but continues to help.
28	8	"Come Blow Your Horn"	Charles Beeson	Rockne S. O'Bannon	November 13, 2013	2J7708	5.17
Miles and Rachel are interrogating a captured Patriot soldier when they are informed by Charlie about a statement Truman made to the town, claiming Miles and Aaron were behind the store bombing. Rachel tells Charlie that the Patriots will never stop looking for them unless they kill Horn. After realizing the Patriot HQ is in the town paper factory, they devise a plan to send Rachel to drop poisonous gas into the factory. Monroe, Aaron, and Cynthia are waiting for Miles to come for them. Cynthia asks Aaron if he killed Carl, her late husband, and he says he did but he can't control his powers. Aaron breaks down in tears and asks Cynthia to leave him alone. They are discovered by Patriot soldiers sent by Horn, who Monroe attempts to fight off. On the verge of being overwhelmed by too many Patriots, Monroe flees, leaving Aaron and Cynthia to be captured. Miles calls off the mission when Gene enters the factory, but Rachel continues anyway. As Rachel prepares to drop the poison, Aaron and Cynthia are led into the factory. Miles stops her just in time. Inside the factory, a drugged Aaron begs Horn to let Cynthia go. Cynthia realizes Gene is there and that he is collaborating with the Patriots. Horn refuses to let her go, saying she is assurance that Aaron will not torch the factory, and orders Gene to leave. As Cynthia sits in a cell, she hears Aaron screaming from being tortured by Horn. Horn observes Aaron’s skin healing when cut. Miles, Rachel, and Charlie kidnap Gene and question him. He says the Patriots were the ones who gave him the medicine way back when and he took it. Truman shows up demanding they all come out. Gene emerges, alone, and holds a knife to Truman's throat. The soldiers chase Miles, Rachel, and Charlie. Truman holds a gun to Gene's head and takes him back to the factory. Horn brings Cynthia into the room to see if Aaron can heal her when they cut her. Aaron screams as they stab her in the back and the fire flashes. Meanwhile, in North Carolina, Neville walks into a Patriot camp to see Commander Roger Allenford. When asked his business, Neville holds up a ring. He convinces Allenford that although the commander’s wife is alive, she is an enemy of the Patriots. Neville says if Allenford brings his own wife in for justice, it would raise his standing in the eyes of the Patriots. Neville further convinces the commander that bringing her in would ultimately protect Allenford’s son and the commander’s life. At the barn where Justine Allenford is being held captive, she asks Roger (her husband) to kill Neville and Jason and then run away with her, but Roger says there is no place to run to and shoots her. Flashback: Eighteen years before the Blackout, when Horn was young, his mother is dying of sickness, and his father tries to heal his wife through prayer rather than medicine. He offers to get help for his mother, but his father will not allow it. However, Horn gets prescription drugs from his friend's house to save his mother. When he gives the medicine to his mother, she dies. After he discovers what happened, his father blames him for her death.
29	9	"Everyone Says I Love You"	Steve Boyum	Trey Callaway & Paul Grellong	November 20, 2013	2J7709	5.37
Miles, Rachel, and Charlie move to rescue Aaron. They discover all the soldiers knocked out and Aaron and Cynthia gone. Following their escape route, they look in a fog-shrouded forest, with the Patriots searching too. They are eventually joined by Monroe and follow the trail to a local high school. At the high school, Aaron wakes up next to Cynthia, alive and apparently healed from her injuries. He discovers a small boy who says he lives there. After Cynthia wakes up, she notes that she does not see the boy and it becomes apparent that the boy is a manifestation of the nanotech. The nanotech says it has been helping Aaron because he woke it up. The Patriots arrive at the high school just before Miles and company. A competing search begins for Aaron. Miles collapses from his arm infection and confesses his love for Rachel as Patriots burst in. Neville boards a train bound for Washington D.C. with Jason and Commander Allenford. They are headed for the White House. His wife boards the train too, although she is newly married. After reuniting, they conspire to greater political ambitions. Horn discovers Aaron fleeing and holds him at gunpoint. After Horn shoots dead Cynthia, the boy reappears. In his grief, Aaron requests that the boy kill all the Patriots in the school. He complies, but wonders why Aaron did not ask for Cynthia to be healed. The boy is confused and vanishes, leaving Cynthia dead and Aaron alone. Flashback: Six years before the blackout, Miles arrives at an airport, and is met by Rachel. Before he departs, Rachel offers to leave her husband for Miles, but Miles says to Rachel that they can't keep doing this. Rachel tells Miles to love her, but Miles, who wants Rachel to be with her family, tells her that he doesn't love her. Miles apologizes and heads into the terminal, leaving Rachel devastated.
30	10	"The Three Amigos"	Charles Beeson	David Rambo & Anne Cofell Saunders	January 8, 2014	2J7710	5.93
After the group is reunited, Charlie and Monroe save Gene from the Patriots and escape to a farmhouse. Gene helps Miles tend his injury. The next day, Aaron stands next to Cynthia's grave, wondering why the nanotech told him to go to Spring City, Oklahoma the previous day. Meanwhile, when Miles wakes up, Monroe asks him where his son is. Miles tells him that his son is in Mexico and his name is Connor. Miles, Rachel and Monroe then travel to Mexico to find Connor, although Rachel is not happy going with Monroe as he killed her son. Meanwhile, Aaron leaves the farmhouse and journeys to Spring City, Oklahoma. Gene and Charlie discover that Aaron is gone. When Miles, Rachel and Monroe enter Mexico, Monroe discovers that Connor became part of the Mexican cartel. Connor recognizes Miles at the bar. After Monroe reveals everything to his son, Connor threatens him and tells his father to go away. That night, Monroe blames Miles for sending his son to Mexico, which led Connor to become like this. Monroe goes back to talk to Connor. Connor tells his father that he knows Miles sent him to Mexico to keep him safe from Monroe. Monroe tells him that he and Connor should take back and lead the Monroe Republic. Then, one of members of the Mexican cartel captures Monroe, and Connor has him detained. Rachel and Miles realize that Monroe has been captured. Meanwhile, Gene notices two wagons being brought to Willoughby by the Patriots. Meanwhile, Neville, Julia, Jason and the Patriots, including Commander Roger Allenford, head to Washington D.C. and enter the White House, where a party is being held. Julia's new husband, Victor Doyle, who is a member of the Patriots, is going to be promoted. Julia and Neville decide to kill the current Chief of Staff, Bill Harlow, so that Doyle can be promoted to Chief of Staff. After this succeeds, Julia will force Doyle to let Neville be promoted into his security detail. Neville attempts to poison Harlow's drink, but gets distracted and fails. Neville manages to enter Harlow's room and kills him by putting poison in his throat. Meanwhile, outside of Willoughby, Charlie kills two Patriot members. Charlie and Gene discover that the Patriots were bringing oranges to the town. Aaron arrives in Spring City but no one is there. Aaron is devastated by Cynthia's death and wants to know why he was brought here. He encounters Grace Beaumont. At the town of Willoughby, the Patriots inject the oranges with something and give them to the townspeople.
31	11	"Mis Dos Padres"	Michael Offer	Rockne S. O'Bannon & Ben Edlund	January 15, 2014	2J7711	4.78
Aaron meets Grace in Spring City, Oklahoma and believes he was sent there to find her. Inside, Aaron finds Priscilla, his first wife. Aaron and Priscilla discover they have a connection with the nanotech and have both been seeing hallucinations and fireflies. They were both involved in the making of a code that allows the nanotech to communicate. Connor marches Monroe as a prisoner to his mansion. Connor suggests that they sell him to the highest bidder. Miles and Rachel plan to rescue him. Monroe attempts to convince Connor to believe him, but when that doesn't work, Miles bashes him over the head and releases Monroe. Monroe tells Miles he can't leave when the blame would lie on Connor. Miles runs for it, but is captured. Connor punishes Monroe for trying to escape by whipping him in front of an audience, which includes Rachel. Rachel finds a way into the house, and is caught by Connor, who pushes a key into her hand. She releases Miles and Monroe, but they are caught on the way out and Connor is threatened for his betrayal. They brawl with the gang, and take Connor with them when they run. Monroe tells Connor they will get back his territory, but they have to get rid of the Patriots first. Charlie and Gene spy on the construction of a US Patriots tent. When Gene spots a friend of theirs, they go to rescue him. Gene sneaks in, only to find that his friend is dead. Charlie comes after him, but they are both caught by armed Patriots. Truman brings them to another tent and releases their handcuffs. They are led into the tent, where it is revealed that there is an outbreak of typhus. They are building a quarantine camp for the outbreak in the general populace. Neville delivers a bouquet of flowers to Julia and presses her about becoming security for her new husband, Doyle, who is now the Chief of Staff. Jason and Neville discover that there are new re-education camps being opened all across the United States. Neville and Julia argue about what she is doing to protect him. Someone breaks into the Chief of Staff's office and Julia believes it to be Neville, but he denies it. Jason admits to the break-in. Jason is quickly found by security and taken away.
32	12	"Captain Trips"	Steve Boyum	Paul Grellong & Jim Barnes	January 22, 2014	2J7712	5.28
Grace leaves Aaron and Priscilla in Spring City, Oklahoma. Aaron receives a visit from the nanotech taking the appearance of Cynthia, saying that he and Priscilla have to go to Lubbock, Texas. After arriving at Willoughby, Miles, Monroe, Rachel and Connor discover that a typhus outbreak has hit the town. Rachel decides to infiltrate the quarantine camp. Meanwhile, in the quarantine camp, Gene and Charlie are forced to work together with Truman and the Patriots in order to save the town. Rachel shows up to help the ill and to get more information about the disease. She finds out that the Patriots are poisoning people with problems (epilepsy, alcohol addiction) to make a pure race and are using the outbreak as a cover. She assumes that the Patriots have an antidote for the virus they created, and when Gene becomes sick she sends a note to Miles and Monroe to get it. Miles and Monroe are outside the camp, and they look for the antidote in a Patriots' warehouse. Not finding anything, they kidnap Truman, injecting him with infected blood to force him to reveal the location of the antidote. Connor accompanies Truman into his office where he can retrieve the antidote. However, he is surrounded by Patriot soldiers before he can leave, holding Truman at gunpoint. In Washington, Julia and Neville try to get information about the incarceration of their son Jason. Julia searches her new husband's office and finds out that he is in Kenilworth Prison. Julia and Neville try to capture her husband, Doyle, Chief of Staff, in order to force him to show them to their son. However, he learns of their plan and has them both arrested. Flashback: Two years after the blackout Julia and Neville murder two campers to get food for their sick child Jason.
33	13	"Happy Endings"	Ernest Dickerson	David Rambo & Trey Callaway	January 29, 2014	2J7713	5.04
Charlie and Rachel race to Gene's aid as he suffers a crisis from his illness. He stops breathing, but they manage to revive him. Connor holds Truman prisoner, with Truman urging a soldier to shoot Connor, but before the soldier can shoot he is killed by Miles. Connor handcuffs the other soldiers and delivers the antidote to Rachel and Charlie. They load Gene into a wagon and depart the quarantine camp, but Truman escapes and injects the antidote into him. Monroe, Connor and Charlie depart for New Vegas, where Monroe intends to hire mercenaries. They meet Duncan, a female warlord, and Monroe wants to talk to her, but she tells them to walk back. Charlie then pulls a gun on her, but Monroe convinces both Duncan's guards and Charlie to stand down. He bargains with Duncan for some of her men. During the night, Charlie and Connor are lying under a blanket together, talking about what they have just done, when Monroe comes in, obviously upset with them. Back at camp, Miles and Rachel go to the "drive-in" together. Rachel says "I think 20 years is plenty of foreplay", and they kiss. In order to get the diamonds to pay Duncan, Monroe, Connor and Charlie hatch a plan to rob the casino. Monroe agrees to be in a prize fight that night, drawing the guards away. Connor pretends to be drunk and falls in the casino, drawing attention while Charlie escapes with the diamond lock box, later revealed to be a fake. Connor retrieves the real one, but he and Monroe are caught before leaving New Vegas. Neville is being held captive at the capital, where he is clearly malnourished and abused. He is brought to President Jack Davis. The President threatens Neville with Julia's safety to get Neville to hunt down Monroe and assassinate him. Neville tells the President that he needs Jason to come with him. After arriving at Willoughby, Texas, Neville and Jason meet with Truman, who tells them if they fail, he'll send word to Washington and order Julia to be killed. Later, Neville finds Miles' camp and swears to him that he wants to get revenge on the Patriots for the death of his wife. Aaron and Priscilla arrive in Lubbock, Texas, where they find Peter, the third member of their MIT nanotech developing group. Peter is a born-again Christian, who is working miracles thanks to the nanotech's help. A blind and burned woman who was in the Atlanta bombing is brought forward and Peter prays over her, with both Aaron and Priscilla seeing the fireflies over him. In front of his church, Peter completely heals her. Peter locks Aaron and Priscilla in a room after they reveal the truth, saying that the people's faith cannot waver.
34	14	"Fear and Loathing"	Liz Friedlander	Anne Cofell Saunders & Matt Pitts	February 26, 2014	2J7714	4.63
Monroe and Connor are trapped in New Vegas. Their only means of escape is to fight each other to the death, in which case only one of them will walk out alive. Duncan refuses to help, and Charlie is locked up and put to work. Monroe teaches Connor all of his weaknesses, including that he has a blind spot on his left side. He also reveals to Connor that he was partly responsible for the death of Emma, Connor's mother, fuelling Connor's rage. Duncan, saved by Charlie from being killed, repays her by letting Monroe and Connor escape. After they escape, Duncan gives them several men to take down the Patriots. Meanwhile, Miles and Rachel discovers that Neville and Jason are working for the Patriots, in order to save Neville's wife, Julia. Meanwhile, Peter repeatedly insists that Aaron do something to fix the dying nanotech. Instead, Aaron creates a virus in the code in an attempt to shut down the nanotech, but the computer explodes, knocking Aaron and Priscilla out. Aaron then wakes on March 5, 2014, with the world seemingly still powered and never affected by the blackout.
35	15	"Dreamcatcher"	Roxann Dawson	Ben Edlund & Paul Grellong	March 5, 2014	2J7715	4.76
Aaron wakes up in a world where there is still power, married to Priscilla, and running a company. When he arrives at work, two of his employees bring him into a room and present him with the code. He slowly realizes that the nanotech has created this world as an illusion in an attempt to make him fix the code that will save it. Aaron escapes and seeks out Rachel, however, she has no memory of him. Nevertheless, he convinces her to help him. Once they arrive at Miles' house, he tries to convince Miles as well, but he thinks Aaron is nuts. Aaron longs to stay in this world, but he knows it is all fake, so he falls backwards off a building. When he wakes up, an unnatural lightning storm begins, which is perceived to be the nanotech's dying strikes as it releases all the energy it had been absorbing. After Rachael dies from a lightning bolt, Aaron enters the code so the nanotech can heal her, and learns that this, too, was an illusion designed to trick Aaron into saving the nanotech. After leaving the town, Aaron and Priscilla continue on their journey back to Willoughby. They suspect that the nanotech is not finished with them.
36	16	"Exposition Boulevard"	Nick Copus	David Rambo & Trey Callaway	March 12, 2014	2J7716	4.63
Miles and Rachel escape from Neville and Jason, who are working for the Patriots, and reunite with Monroe, Connor and Charlie, along with Duncan's men. They find out that the quarantine camp featured previously has been converted into a re-education camp, which was built by Doyle. They also find that the re-education camp is using children from Willoughby and other towns. One of the kid's fathers inadvertently activates programming in his daughter cadet when he recites the numbers from a tattoo discovered on her eyelid. They return to the encampment, only to be attacked by Neville and Truman. Before they escape, Rachel convinces Miles let the cadet go. In Washington D.C., President Jack Davis is told by Commander Allenford that the re-education centers are up and running. Meanwhile, Aaron continues his journey to Willoughby with Priscilla, who is later enveloped by nanotech fireflies. Flashback: Six months after the blackout, Truman is a US Army corporal guarding prisoners at the U.S. Naval Station in Guantanamo Bay, Cuba. The U.S. government arrives and announces their plans to the soldiers stationed there, starting a new form of dictatorship. They are headed by the Secretary of Defense named Jack Davis.
37	17	"Why We Fight"	Frederick E. O. Toye	Rockne S. O'Bannon	March 19, 2014	2J7717	4.26
Monroe and the others debate what to do about the Patriots, especially after their remaining safe house is compromised with the help of the cadet Miles allowed to go free. Gene tries to convince local bar operator, Marion, to get the townspeople to side with them. Meanwhile, Monroe and the others have found more of Duncan's men, and one of Duncan's tribe members reveals that Duncan was killed by the Patriots, because the Patriots are hunting down war clans. With Duncan's men backing him, Monroe moves to attack the re-education camp and kills every patriot soldier there. Meanwhile, Neville and Jason are captured by Doyle, who knows that Neville is going to kill him. When Monroe attacks the camp, Neville kills Doyle and escapes with Jason. At the bar, just as Marion is being convinced by Gene that the patriots have lied, Truman arrives for dinner (he and Marion are engaged). Marion is horrified by the killing spree at the camp, and tells Truman about Miles and Gene managing to escape. After translating an Arabic journal, the group learns that Patriot cadets will be used to attack Austin, seat of the Texas government.
38	18	"Austin City Limits"	Helen Shaver	Paul Grellong & Jim Barnes	April 2, 2014	2J7718	4.40
Frustrated with Neville, Jason turns to Miles with crucial information about the Patriots' next steps for Texas. When they arrive at Austin, they find the Patriots' hideout, where they discover that the cadets are going to kill General Frank Blanchard, a former Texas leader, who retired before General Carver became the leader of Texas. When Miles and Monroe tell Blanchard everything about the Patriots, he believes them. Blanchard is stabbed by a cadet, who then stabs herself. The Texas Rangers burst in and see Miles and Monroe as killers, but Miles and Monroe manage to escape. Meanwhile, Jason captures a Patriot member, and demands to know where the cadets are. Attempting to stop the assassination, Miles, Monroe, Jason, Charlie and Connor arrive at the Capitol Building, where General Carver is making his speech. Meanwhile, Jason is captured and reactivated by the Patriots. Charlie spies Jason walking into the building as the Patriots' backup, but before he can kill Charlie, Charlie kills Jason with a rifle, which makes a noise during the speech. Miles shoots the cadet, who tries to kill Carver. Charlie is devastated when Jason dies. Meanwhile, Aaron discovers Priscilla is being controlled by the nanotech, which wants to learn how to 'be human'. Later, Aaron and (the nano-controlled) Priscilla reunite with Rachel in Willoughby, Texas.
39	19	"$#!& Happens"	John F. Showalter	Anne Cofell Saunders & David Reed	April 30, 2014	2J7719	4.32
Now outside of Austin with the Texas Rangers in pursuit, Miles leads them away to buy Monroe, Connor and Charlie time to escape and return to the camp. Knocked from his carriage and confronted by the rangers, Miles fails to reason with them and is seriously injured in the ensuing gunfight. With the rangers now dead, Miles makes his way to an abandoned house but ends up trapped in the basement, alone and wounded, where he attempts to treat his wound. Meanwhile, Charlie and Rachel decide to search for Miles along with Monroe. During the search, Charlie is confronted by Neville who demands to know where Jason is. She leads him to a house, but he holds her at gunpoint, forcing her to reveal that she had previously killed Jason in self defense. Meanwhile, Aaron continues to deal with the nanotech-controlled Priscilla's demands, and learns that she knew where Miles was, but believed him not worth the effort of saving. Desperate and alone, Miles successfully escapes from the basement after burning the ceiling. Flashback: Six months ago, alone and drinking in a bar in Willoughby, Miles walks outside and is drawn to a nearby shed. Inside he encounters a nanotech illusion of Ben Mattheson. The nanotech recreated Ben talks about Miles' relationship with Rachel. Angered by this, Miles then burns the shed down.
40	20	"Tomorrowland"	David Boyd	Trey Callaway & Ryan Parrott	May 7, 2014	2J7720	3.78
When the camp is attacked with mustard gas by the Patriots, Monroe, enraged by what has happened, suggests to Miles that they steal some mustard gas to use against the Patriots. That night, Aaron follows a nanotech-controlled Priscilla to a house and learns of the nanotech's experiments on humans to learn about human nature and of its plans for humanity, to his horror. Meanwhile, Neville captures a Patriot officer and learns through torture that his wife Julia is dead. With the mustard gas now in their possession, Miles has Rachel destroy it. When the group learns from Marion that the Patriots plan to ship 100 tons of the gas into the area, she offers to gather more information on them by using her relationship with Truman to their advantage. Angered by Miles' actions, Monroe confronts him and leaves the camp with Connor. The next day, while retrieving weapons near a chemical plant, Connor is taken hostage and held at knife-point by Neville, who reveals that he wishes to join them.
41	21	"Memorial Day"	John F. Showalter	David Rambo & Ben Edlund	May 14, 2014	2J7721	3.91
When the group learns of a Patriot plot to use mustard gas against the Texas Republic to incite a war between Texas and California, they hijack a train carrying what they believe to be the gas. Meanwhile, Rachel learns of the nanotech's experiments, and along with Aaron attempts to save Priscilla. That night, with the train now stopped, Monroe, Connor and Neville hold the group at gunpoint. Neville holds Charlie at gunpoint, but during the ensuing struggle a shot is fired and the group learns that the tanker was empty. Back in Willoughby, the Patriots invite General Carver and the Texas Rangers to a courthouse where the President makes his speech. Marion learns of the Patriots' plan to use the gas at the courthouse, but is discovered and killed by Truman. Miles, Monroe, Charlie and Gene make their way back to Willoughby, but a lone Patriot officer deploys the gas.
42	22	"Declaration of Independence"	Charles Beeson	Rockne S. O'Bannon & Paul Grellong	May 21, 2014	2J7722	4.13
Now in Willoughby, Miles and the group successfully stop the mustard gas attack on the courthouse, but during the ensuing chaos, Truman, along with the President and General Carver, escape. Believing their plan to be in ruin, Truman shoots Carver dead, and then shoots himself and the President in the arm, and informs the President that this is Plan B. Back at the house, with the nanotech-controlled Priscilla out of control, Aaron reaches out and helps free her from their control by confessing his love for her. The next day, when Miles hears news that the President has blamed him, along with Monroe and the California commonwealth, for Carver's death, he comes up with a plan to kidnap the President to prevent a war between Texas and California. While en route to Austin with the President, the group is attacked by Patriot officers. When Miles allows Monroe to take the President ahead, Monroe takes him to an abandoned building where he meets Connor. When Monroe fails to reason with Connor, Neville opens fire, forcing Monroe to leave along with the President before trapping them both in a building. With his plan now in motion, and seemingly caught by the Patriots, Miles tricks the President into confessing his involvement in Carver's death to the Texas Rangers dressed as Patriot officers. Meanwhile, the Texas Republic declares war on the Patriots, and at a nearby camp, an order is given to shoot any Patriots on sight. Priscilla awakens and tells Aaron of a terrifying vision she experienced as the nanotech lost control of her, that of millions of humans under the nanotech's control, and that of a grinning man. Meanwhile, the nanotech appears to Neville in the form of his son Jason, Truman in the form of Marion, and the imprisoned President as his father, informing them that they have to travel to Bradbury, Idaho. Later that night, in the Wasteland (Bradbury, Idaho), the nanotech restores power to several buildings, including a clown sign, and a large crowd of people walks toward it.

== Digital comics ==
Between May 4 and June 15, 2015, four separate digital chapters were released fortnightly. Each of the four chapters have a specifically designed cover, all illustrated by DC Comics artist Angel Hernandez.

No. in series	Issue	Title	Illustrated by	Written by	Original release
43	1	"Chapter 1 of 4: Electric Avenue"	Angel Hernandez	David Reed & Ryan Parrott	May 4, 2015
Charlie introduces us to what's been going on the show since the second season finale: Power has been restored in Bradbury, Idaho by the nanotech. The nanotech are also controlling the citizens actions, and allow anyone to visit the city as long as they follow the rules. Now one year since the Patriots, Rachel continues to work on the Pendant and is able to get it working again, and shows it to Aaron and Priscilla. Grace appears to the group and tells them that she has found a way to kill the nanotech, by infecting it with a virus she has been working on. She tells them to travel to Bradbury, Idaho, and that she may be able to bring the power back. Grace later dies in the morning. Meanwhile, Monroe and Miles continue their fight against the Patriots and are joined by Charlie. But while checking an old store, they come across Rachel and her group who ask for their help.
44	2	"Chapter 2 of 4: The Searchers"	Angel Hernandez	David Reed & Ryan Parrott	May 18, 2015
Miles and Monroe initially refuse to help Rachel, but Charlie decides to help, causing Miles to join. The group of six struggles to Bradbury, where Priscilla sees the sign that the nanotech showed her. They enter Bradbury, and send Aaron and Priscilla to upload the virus into a computer while the rest fend off the townspeople. Miles recognizes Tom Neville at the front, apparently possessed by the nanotech, as are all the people. Neville tells them he initially wanted to kill them in revenge for Jason, but the nanotech showed him that true power is forgiveness, and is flanked by Truman and President Davis. Neville then tells them that the town is all about forgiveness, and they have an option. Join the town, or die. As he says this, an unseen person puts a gun to Aaron's head as he is about to activate the virus.
45	3	"Chapter 3 of 4: Death in the Family"	Angel Hernandez	David Reed & Ryan Parrott	June 1, 2015
Charlie talks about seeing a group of ants kill a rabbit when she was a girl, and says she now knows how the rabbit felt. When the group does not wish to surrender, Neville tries to persuade them by showing them Connor - the person who has a gun to Aaron's head - is among them. Connor states that he forgives his father for loving Miles more than him. When Neville tries to say that Connor has the life Monroe couldn't give him, Monroe shoots him in the head, killing him. President Davis orders the possessed townspeople to attack, since the nanotech cannot attack them directly due to their proximity to the pendant. Aaron, Priscilla, Charlie and Rachel escape to an isolated area and attempt to activate the virus, while Miles and Monroe fight the townspeople. Charlie kills President Davis, and Miles is stabbed non-fatally, but saved by Monroe. As Aaron is about to activate the virus, he and Priscilla are shot dead by Truman, and the computer is destroyed. Monroe kills Truman and the survivors flee. Rachel, who realizes the terrible, selfish things she did in the past, plans to turn herself over to the nanotech. After telling Charlie and Miles about the terrible things she did, Rachel tells Miles to look after their daughter, kisses him, and goes to join the townspeople, led by Connor, and destroys the pendant. Rachel is then shown possessed by the nanotech.
46	4	"Chapter 4 of 4: Into the Light"	Angel Hernandez	David Reed & Ryan Parrott	June 15, 2015
Rachel is in the midst of a Nanite-induced hallucination, where they use Ben to tell her that, rather than nearly destroy humanity, she saved it by creating them. They see the downfall of the pre-Blackout world as inevitable, and they are doing humanity a favor by being in control. Rachel admits that her joining was a trick, as she recites the virus code. This disables the Nanites, but also kills everyone possessed, including Connor and Rachel. Charlie, Monroe, and Miles later bury their friends and go their separate ways. Miles and Charlie return to Sylvania Estates, while Monroe disappears to somewhere in South America. The story then fast-forwards to years later with the power never returning. Miles, who is still sad, struggles with guilt over Rachel's death, but eventually settles down with a woman and has a son with her. The series ends with a grown-up Charlie telling the whole story to her younger half-brother on the Ferris Wheel next to Miles' grave.

== Ratings ==
Altogether a total of 24.2 million American viewers watched all or some of the premiere episode and/or the encore two days later.

=== Season 1 (2012–13) ===
Viewership and ratings per episode of List of Revolution episodes
No.	Title	Air date	Rating/share (18–49)	Viewers (millions)	DVR (18–49)	DVR viewers (millions)	Total (18–49)	Total viewers (millions)
1	"Pilot"	September 17, 2012	4.1/11	11.65	1.8	—N/a	5.9	—N/a
2	"Chained Heat"	September 24, 2012	3.4/9	9.21	2.3	4.87	5.7	14.08
3	"No Quarter"	October 1, 2012	3.2/8	8.32	2.1	4.48	5.3	12.79
4	"The Plague Dogs"	October 8, 2012	3.0/8	8.01	1.9	4.22	4.9	12.23
5	"Soul Train"	October 15, 2012	3.3/9	8.61	1.9	4.10	5.2	12.71
6	"Sex and Drugs"	October 29, 2012	3.0/7	7.90	1.7	4.13	4.6	11.84
7	"The Children's Crusade"	November 5, 2012	2.8/7	7.34	2.0	4.72	4.8	12.09
8	"Ties That Bind"	November 12, 2012	2.6/7	7.10	1.8	3.99	4.4	11.09
9	"Kashmir"	November 19, 2012	2.6/7	7.02	1.8	4.41	4.4	11.43
10	"Nobody's Fault But Mine"	November 26, 2012	2.9/8	8.59	1.7	4.03	4.6	12.63
11	"The Stand"	March 25, 2013	2.6/7	7.03	1.4	3.80	4.0	10.83
12	"Ghosts"	April 1, 2013	2.2/6	6.36	1.4	3.27	3.6	9.63
13	"Song Remains The Same"	April 8, 2013	2.2/6	6.06	1.5	3.57	3.7	9.63
14	"The Night The Lights Went..."	April 22, 2013	2.0/6	5.88	0.8	1.98	2.8	7.86
15	"Home"	April 29, 2013	1.8/6	5.49	1.5	3.42	3.3	8.90
16	"The Love Boat"	May 6, 2013	2.0/5	6.06	1.4	3.33	3.4	9.39
17	"The Longest Day"	May 13, 2013	1.9/5	5.51	1.3	3.43	3.2	8.95
18	"Clue"	May 20, 2013	1.9/5	5.64	1.4	3.26	3.2	8.77
19	"Children of Men"	May 27, 2013	1.9/5	6.32	—N/a	—N/a	—N/a	—N/a
20	"The Dark Tower"	June 3, 2013	2.0/5	6.17	—N/a	—N/a	—N/a	—N/a

=== Season 2 (2013–14) ===
Viewership and ratings per episode of List of Revolution episodes
No.	Title	Air date	Rating/share (18–49)	Viewers (millions)	DVR (18–49)	DVR viewers (millions)	Total (18–49)	Total viewers (millions)
1	"Born in the U.S.A."	September 25, 2013	1.8/6	6.81	1.1	2.79	2.9	9.60
2	"There Will Be Blood"	October 2, 2013	1.6/5	5.46	1.0	2.77	2.6	8.24
3	"Love Story"	October 9, 2013	1.5/5	5.45	1.0	2.49	2.5	7.94
4	"Patriot Games"	October 16, 2013	1.4/4	5.42	1.1	—N/a	2.5	—N/a
5	"One Riot, One Ranger"	October 23, 2013	1.4/4	5.04	1.0	2.49	2.4	7.53
6	"Dead Man Walking"	October 30, 2013	1.4/4	4.87	0.9	2.46	2.3	7.35
7	"The Patriot Act"	November 6, 2013	1.4/4	5.21	1.1	2.71	2.5	7.92
8	"Come Blow Your Horn"	November 13, 2013	1.5/4	5.17	0.9	—N/a	2.4	7.57
9	"Everyone Says I Love You"	November 20, 2013	1.4/4	5.37	0.9	2.39	2.3	7.76
10	"The Three Amigos"	January 8, 2014	1.5/5	5.93	0.9	2.22	2.4	8.15
11	"Mis Dos Padres"	January 15, 2014	1.3/4	4.78	1.0	2.40	2.3	7.19
12	"Captain Trips"	January 22, 2014	1.5/4	5.28	1.0	2.21	2.5	7.49
13	"Happy Endings"	January 29, 2014	1.3/4	5.04	0.9	2.19	2.2	7.22
14	"Fear and Loathing"	February 26, 2014	1.3/4	4.63	0.9	—N/a	2.2	n/a
15	"Dreamcatcher"	March 5, 2014	1.3/4	4.76	0.9	—N/a	2.2	—N/a
16	"Exposition Boulevard"	March 12, 2014	1.3/4	4.63	0.8	—N/a	2.1	—N/a
17	"Why We Fight"	March 19, 2014	1.2/4	4.26	0.8	—N/a	2.0	—N/a
18	"Austin City Limits"	April 2, 2014	1.3/4	4.40	0.8	—N/a	2.1	—N/a
19	"$#!& Happens"	April 30, 2014	1.3/4	4.32	0.7	1.85	2.0	6.17
20	"Tomorrowland"	May 7, 2014	1.1/4	3.78	0.8	—N/a	1.9	—N/a
21	"Memorial Day"	May 14, 2014	1.2/4	3.91	—N/a	—N/a	—N/a	—N/a
22	"Declaration of Independence"	May 21, 2014	1.1/4	4.13	0.6	1.90	1.7	6.03
