= Željko Ivanek =

Slovenian-American actor (born 1957)

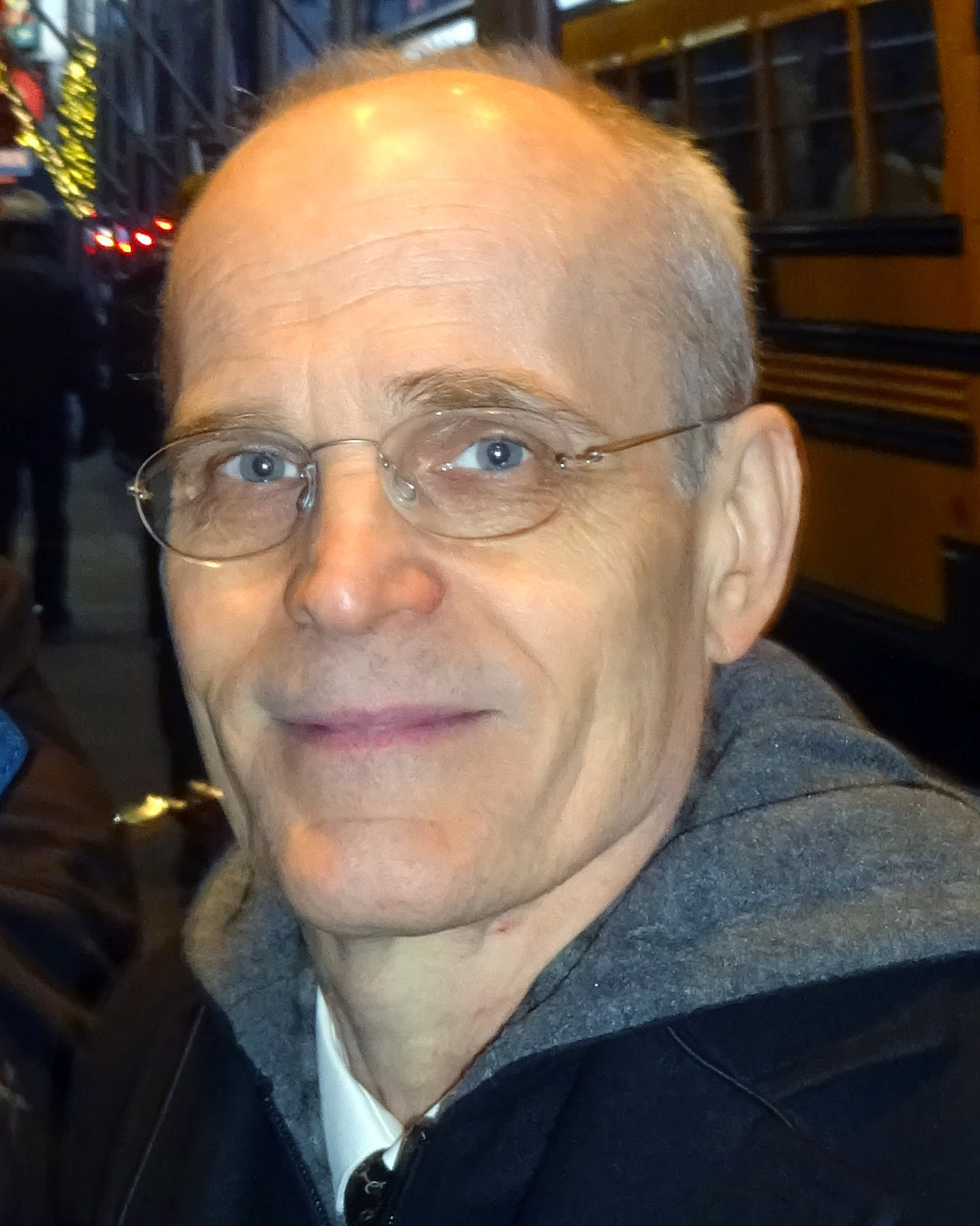
- Ivanek in 2017
- Born: August 15, 1957 (age 69); Ljubljana, PR Slovenia, FPR Yugoslavia (now Slovenia)
- Education: Yale University (BA); London Academy of Music and Dramatic Art
- Occupation: Actor
- Years active: 1981–present
- Partner: Greg Pierce
- Father: Ferdo Ivanek

Željko Ivanek (/ˈʒɛlkoʊ ɪˈvɑːnɪk/; Slovene: [ˈʒɛːlkɔ iˈʋaːnək]; born August 15, 1957) is a Slovenian-American actor. His accolades include an Actor Award, a Drama Desk Award, and a Primetime Emmy Award, as well as nominations for three Tony Awards.

Ivanek's film credits include Courage Under Fire (1996), Donnie Brasco (1997), Hannibal, Black Hawk Down (both 2001), Unfaithful (2002), The Manchurian Candidate (2004), Live Free or Die Hard (2007), The Bourne Legacy, Argo, Seven Psychopaths (all 2012). He has appeared in several films by Lars von Trier, including Dancer in the Dark (2000), Dogville (2003), and Manderlay (2005). In 2017, he appeared in Three Billboards Outside Ebbing, Missouri, receiving a Screen Actors Guild Award for his performance.

Ivanek portrayed Ray Fiske on the FX television series Damages (2007–2010), for which he won the 2008 Primetime Emmy for Outstanding Supporting Actor. He also appeared as Ed Danvers on Homicide: Life on the Street (1993–1999) and Russell Jackson on the CBS drama Madam Secretary (2014–2019), and has had recurring roles on series such as Oz (1997–2003), 24 (2002), True Blood (2008), Heroes (2009), Big Love (2009–2010), Banshee (2014), 12 Monkeys (2015–2017), and The Walking Dead: Dead City (2023–2026).

== Early life and education ==
Ivanek was born in Ljubljana, PR Slovenia, FPR Yugoslavia. His father was Ferdo Ivanek, who grew up in Zajezda, in the Croatian region of Hrvatsko Zagorje, and spent his later childhood in Varaždin. In 1960, Željko, his younger brother Ivan, and his mother immigrated to Palo Alto, California, United States, where his father was working as a research assistant at the Department of Electrical Engineering at Stanford University. His mother also worked at Stanford University as a project manager.

In 1962, Ivanek and his family moved back to Slovenia for five years; they returned to Palo Alto in 1967. Having performed in numerous community theater plays in the San Francisco Bay Area, Ivanek graduated from Ellwood P. Cubberley High School in Palo Alto in 1975. In 1978, Ivanek graduated from Yale University, majoring in theater. He later attended the London Academy of Music and Dramatic Art.

== Acting career ==
Ivanek has worked extensively on the stage. In 1982, he originated the role of Hally in Athol Fugard's play "Master Harold"...and the Boys. He appeared in the American premieres of Cloud 9 (for which he earned the 1981 Drama Desk Award for Outstanding Featured Actor in a Play), and The Pillowman. He performs frequently on Broadway and has been nominated for three Tony Awards for his performances in the original production of Brighton Beach Memoirs, in Two Shakespearean Actors, and in a revival of The Caine Mutiny Court-Martial, alongside David Schwimmer and Tim Daly.

However, Ivanek is perhaps best known for his supporting roles in a number of well-known television series. His first television role was as Sammie Wheaton on the soap opera The Edge of Night. Other roles include Emile Danko in Heroes; Roland in The X-Files; prosecuting attorney Ed Danvers in Homicide: Life on the Street; Ray Fiske in Damages (for which received the Primetime Emmy Award for Outstanding Supporting Actor in a Drama Series); J.J. in Big Love; the Magister in True Blood; Governor James Devlin in Oz; Serbian terrorist Andre Drazen in 24; and Blake Sterling, the Director of National Intelligence in the NBC drama series The Event.

Ivanek played Russell Jackson in the TV series Madam Secretary. He portrayed John Dickinson, the Pennsylvania representative to the Second Continental Congress, in the miniseries John Adams. He has guest-starred on such shows as Law & Order: Special Victims Unit and House. He has appeared several times on Law & Order, both as one-off characters and as Ed Danvers in crossover episodes with Homicide: Life on the Street.

In addition to his stage and television work, Ivanek has appeared in more than 20 feature films, including The Sender, in which he made his feature film debut as the unnamed title character; School Ties; Black Hawk Down; In Bruges; Dogville; The Bourne Legacy; Donnie Brasco; Argo; Seven Psychopaths; and Three Billboards Outside Ebbing, Missouri.

In 2012, he portrayed Dr. Stafford White in the drama The Mob Doctor. As of 2014, he had supporting roles in several shows on broadcast and cable television, including the series Revolution, where he plays the recurring roles of Dr. Calvin Horn and an illusory nanotech avatar of Horn; Suits; Banshee; and The Americans.

In the documentary That Guy... Who Was in That Thing, Ivanek states that his contract includes a rider to ensure that the first letter in his name, Ž, has its caron properly rendered in any credits sequence where his name appears.

== Personal life ==
As of 2018, Ivanek resided in New York City with his partner, Greg Pierce. Pierce is the nephew of actor David Hyde Pierce.

== Acting credits ==
=== Film ===
Year	Title	Role	Notes
1982	The Soldier	Bombmaker/Cleaning lady	
1982	Tex	Mark Jennings	Credited as "Hitchhiker"
1982	The Sender	John Doe #83 / The Sender	
1984	Mass Appeal	Mark Dolson	
1984	The Sun Also Rises	Bill Gorton	
1987	Rachel River	Momo	
1990	Artificial Paradise	Willy	
1991	Our Sons	Donald Barnes	
1992	School Ties	Mr. Cleary	
1996	White Squall	Coast Guard Captain Sanders	
1996	Courage Under Fire	Ben Banacek	
1996	Infinity	Bill Price	
1996	The Associate	SEC Agent Thompkins	
1997	Donnie Brasco	Tim Curley	
1997	Julian Po	Tom Potter	
1998	Nowhere to Go	Principal Jack Walker	
1998	A Civil Action	Bill Crowley	
1999	Snow Falling on Cedars	Dr. Whitman	
2000	Dancer in the Dark	District Attorney	
2001	Hannibal	Dr. Cordell Doemling	
2001	Black Hawk Down	Lieutenant Colonel Gary Harrell	
2002	Unfaithful	Detective Dean	
2003	Dogville	Ben	
2004	The Manchurian Candidate	Vaughn Utly	
2005	Manderlay	Dr. Hector	
2006	The Hoax	Ralph Graves	
2007	Ascension Day	Master Travis	
2007	Live Free or Die Hard	Molina	
2008	In Bruges	Canadian Guy	
2011	Tower Heist	FBI Director Mazin	
2012	The Bourne Legacy	Dr. Donald Foite	
2012	Argo	Robert Pender	Nominated—Phoenix Film Critics Society Award for Best Cast; Nominated—San Diego Film Critics Society Award for Best Performance by an Ensemble
2012	Seven Psychopaths	Paulo	Boston Society of Film Critics Award for Best Cast; Nominated—San Diego Film Critics Society Award for Best Performance by an Ensemble
2012	The Words	Cutler	
2016	X-Men: Apocalypse	Pentagon Scientist	
2017	Three Billboards Outside Ebbing, Missouri	Desk Sergeant Cedric Connoly	Critics' Choice Movie Award for Best Acting Ensemble; Screen Actors Guild Award for Outstanding Performance by a Cast in a Motion Picture
2020	The Courier	John A. McCone	
2021	The Last Duel	Le Coq	

=== Television ===
Year	Title	Role	Notes
1983	Great Performances	March Hare	Episode: "Alice in Wonderland"
1986	American Playhouse	George Deever	Episode: "All My Sons"
1987	St. Elsewhere	Mark Dolson	Episode: "You Again?"
1987	Echoes in the Darkness	Vince Valaitis	Television movie
1990	L.A. Law	Joel Lassen	Episode: "Bound for Glory"
1993	Law & Order	Phillip Swann	Episode: "American Dreams"
1993–1999	Homicide: Life on the Street	Ed Danvers	37 episodes
1994	The X-Files	Roland Fuller / Dr. Arthur Grable	Episode: "Roland"
1995	Murder, She Wrote	Eddie Saunders	Episode: "Home Care"
1995	Truman	Eddie Jacobsen	Television movie
1997–1999	Law & Order	AUSA Ed Danvers	2 episodes
1997	Frasier	Dr. Arnold Shaw	Episode: "Death and the Dog"
1997	The Practice	DA Mark McGovern	Episode: "The Civil Right"
1997	Millennium	Dr. Daniel "Danny" Miller	Episode: "Walkabout"
1997	Ally McBeal	Judge Marshal Pink	Episode: "One Hundred Tears Away"
1997–2003	Oz	Governor James Devlin	27 episodes
1998	From the Earth to the Moon	Ken Mattingly	Episode: "The Original Wives Club"
1998	The Rat Pack	Robert F. Kennedy	Television movie
2000	ER	Bruce Resnick	Episode: "The Dance We Do"
2000	Homicide: The Movie	Ed Danvers	TV film
2001	The Practice	AUSA Steven Sanders	Episode: "The Confession"
2002	The Practice	Matthew Davies	Episode: "Neighboring Species"
2002	24	Andre Drazen	15 episodes
2002	The Twilight Zone	ER chief	Episode: "The Lineman"
2003	The West Wing	Steve Atwood	2 episodes
2003	The Reagans	Michael Deaver	TV movie
2004	Law & Order	Richard Kaplin	Episode: "Gov Love"
2004	Touching Evil	Ronald Hinks	Episode: "Pilot"
2005	NYPD Blue	Justin Deroos	Episode: "Stoli With a Twist"
2005	CSI: Crime Scene Investigation	Andrew Melton	Episode: "Nesting Dolls"
2006	Law & Order: Special Victims Unit	Everett Drake	Episode: "Taboo"
2006	Bones	Carl Decker	Episode: "The Woman in the Car"
2006	Shark	Eliot Dasher	2 episodes
2006	Cold Case	John Doe (John Harding)	Episode: "One Night"
2007–2010	Damages	Raymond "Ray" Fiske	16 episodes Primetime Emmy Award for Outstanding Supporting Actor in a Drama Series; Nominated—Satellite Award for Best Supporting Actor – Series, Miniseries, or Television Film
2007	Lost	Edmund Burke	Episode: "Not in Portland"
2008	Numbers	William Fraley	Episode: "When Worlds Collide"
2008	John Adams	John Dickinson	2 episodes
2008	House	Jason	Episode: "Last Resort"
2008–2014	The Mentalist	Dr. Linus Wagner	2 episodes
2008–2014	True Blood	Magister	5 episodes
2009	Heroes	Emile "The Hunter" Danko	13 episodes
2009–2010	Big Love	J.J.	12 episodes
2010–2011	The Event	Blake Sterling	22 episodes
2013	White Collar	Brett Forsythe	Episode: "Digging Deeper"
2012–2013	The Mob Doctor	Dr. Stafford White	13 episodes
2013–2014	Revolution	Dr. Calvin Horn	5 episodes
2014	Banshee	FBI Special Agent Jim Racine	3 episodes
2014	The Americans	John Skeevers	Episode: "Stealth"
2014–2015	Suits	Eric Woodall	4 episodes
2014–2019	Madam Secretary	Russell Jackson	Main role; 102 episodes
2015–2017	12 Monkeys	Leland Goines	3 episodes
2022	Now and Then	Detective Sullivan	8 episodes
2022	Let the Right One In	Arthur	Recurring role; 4 episodes
2023–2026	The Walking Dead: Dead City	Mile Jurkovic / "The Croat"	Main role; 14 episodes
2024–2026	Law & Order	Defense Attorney Charles Banks	3 episodes
2025	Death by Lightning	Doctor Willard Bliss	4 episodes

=== Theater ===
Year	Title	Role(s)	Notes
1978	Idiot's Delight	Palota	
1978	Design for Living	Photographer	
1978	The School for Wives	Notary	
1978	A Month in the Country	Matvey	
1979	Hay Fever	Sandy Tyrell	
1979	Charley's Aunt	Charley Wykeham	
1979	Children of the Sun	Rioter	
1980	The Front Page	Earl Williams	
1981	The Survivor	Yankele, understudy Rudy	Broadway debut
1981	Cloud 9	Betty/Gerry	Winner: Drama Desk Award for Outstanding Featured Actor in a Play
1982	"Master Harold"...and the Boys	Hally	
1983	Brighton Beach Memoirs	Stanley Jerome	Nomination: Tony Award for Best Featured Actor in a Play
1985	A Map of the World	Stephen	
1986	Loot	Hal	
1988	The Cherry Orchard	Trofimov	
1988	Hamlet	Hamlet	
1990	Ivanov	Lvov	
1991	Two Shakespearean Actors	John Ryder	Nomination: Tony Award for Best Featured Actor in a Play; Nomination: Drama Desk Award for Outstanding Featured Actor in a Play
1992	It's Only a Play	Peter Austin	
1994	The Glass Menagerie	Tom Wingfield	
2001	The Dumb Waiter	Ben	
2001	The Zoo Story	Peter	
2002	Blue/Orange	Robert Smith	
2005	The Pillowman	Ariel	
2006	The Caine Mutiny Court-Martial	Lt. Com. Philip Francis Queeg	Nomination: Tony Award for Best Actor in a Play; Nomination: Drama Desk Award for Outstanding Actor in a Play
2012	Slowgirl	Sterling	
