= Budinščina =

Municipality of Croatia

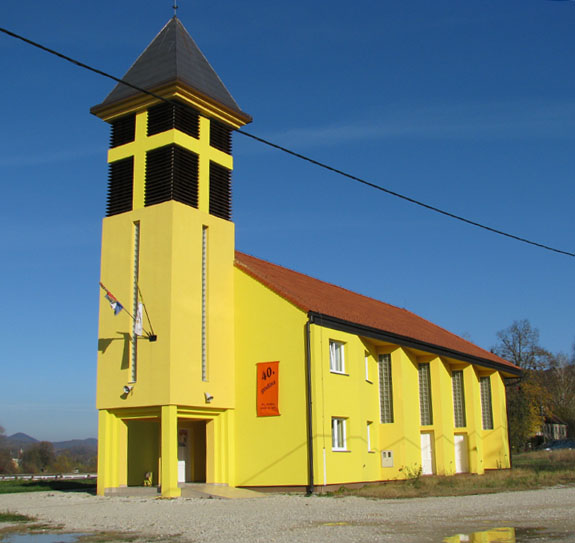
- Interactive map of Budinščina
- The municipality is located in northern Croatia.
- Coordinates: 46°6′36″N 16°12′0″E
- Country: Croatia
- County: Krapina-Zagorje County

Government
  - Mayor: Franjo Jagić (Independent)

Area
  - Total: 55.0 km^{2} (21.2 sq mi)

Population (2021)
  - Total: 2,182
  - Density: 39.7/km^{2} (103/sq mi)
- Time zone: UTC+1 (CET)
  - Summer (DST): UTC+2 (CEST)
- Website: budinscina.hr

Budinščina is a village and municipality in the Krapina-Zagorje County in Croatia. It is connected by the state road D24 and R201 railway.

Milengrad (Milen) castle is located in the municipality.

== History ==
The origin of Budinšćina is linked to 1234, when the land of Budindol is mentioned. The remains of the cultural monuments of the Milengrad castle, the Patačić castle in Zajezda, the Zakmardy manor house in Budinšćina, the school in Zajezda, the Church of the Assumption of the Blessed Virgin Mary in Zajezda speak of the importance of this area in the past. There is also a valuable Bronze Age site in the municipality. The area of the municipality was once a famous mining area with brown coal mines and a quarry of diabase and limestone, which started the economic development of Budinščina.

== Demographics ==
In the 2021 census, there were a total of 2,182 inhabitants in the municipality with Croats being the majority at 99.18%. The following 13 settlements comprise the municipality:

- Budinščina, population 510
- Gotalovec, population 139
- Grtovec, population 299
- Krapinica, population 223
- Marigutić, population 20
- Pažurovec, population 80
- Pece, population 244
- Pokojec, population 4
- Pomperovec, population 46
- Prepuštovec, population 65
- Sveti Križ, population 121
- Topličica, population 138
- Zajezda, population 293
Budinščina: Population trends 1857–2021
v

population	2186	2583	2832	3196	3742	4223	4249	4954	5318	5347	4785	4138	3444	3150	2793	2503	2182
	1857	1869	1880	1890	1900	1910	1921	1931	1948	1953	1961	1971	1981	1991	2001	2011	2021

Sources: Croatian Bureau of Statistics publications

== Administration ==
The current mayor of Budinščina is Franjo Jagić and the Budinščina Municipal Council consists of 9 seats.

Groups	Councilors per group
HSU-HSS-SDP	4 / 9
HDZ	2 / 9
HNS	2 / 9
Dražen Hranić	1 / 9
