= Gotalovec =

- Location within Croatia
- Coordinates: 46°09′25″N 16°13′05″E
- Country: Croatia
- County: Krapina-Zagorje
- Municipality: Budinščina

Area
  - Total: 3.0 km^{2} (1.2 sq mi)
- Elevation: 252 m (827 ft)

Population (2021)
  - Total: 139
  - Density: 46/km^{2} (120/sq mi)
- Time zone: UTC+1 (CET)
  - Summer (DST): UTC+2 (CEST)

Gotalovec is a village in northern Croatia, located near Budinščina in the region of Hrvatsko Zagorje. The population is 187 (census 2001).

== History ==
Gotalovec was founded by the Gotal (Note: also known as Gatal, Gotall, Gothal, Gottal, Gottall, Gotthal, or Gotthall) noble family, first mentioned in 1356, who may have originated in Hrašćina. The village initially consisted of the medieval fort of Gotalovec, dated to dated 1322, and the surrounding villages.

In 1431, at the request of Jacob de Gatalovc, the Zagreb Kaptol officially established the formal boundaries among the Gotalovac estates. The family attained the title of baron in 1710. Following the death of Emeric Gabriel Gotal in 1740–the last male member of the family line–ownership of the estate passed by inheritance to his second wife, Jelena Rozalija Somogy, then to Ljudevit Bedekovic Komorski and then to the Petkovic family.

Finally, in the late 18th century it was incorporated by the noble Erdody family into their estate. The last remain of the Gotalovac fort were removed in 1912 and used to build a nearby road. It is known however that the fort was situated some 100 to 200 meters from one of the source of the river Krapina; in 1988, one could clearly distinguish three levels under an orchard and an access through a hole in a bush which was no more accessible in 2002. Old people sead it gave access to a large room (some sort of wardroom) they visited as children. The 1500 castle was located westward from the fort.
