= Zajezda =

- Village
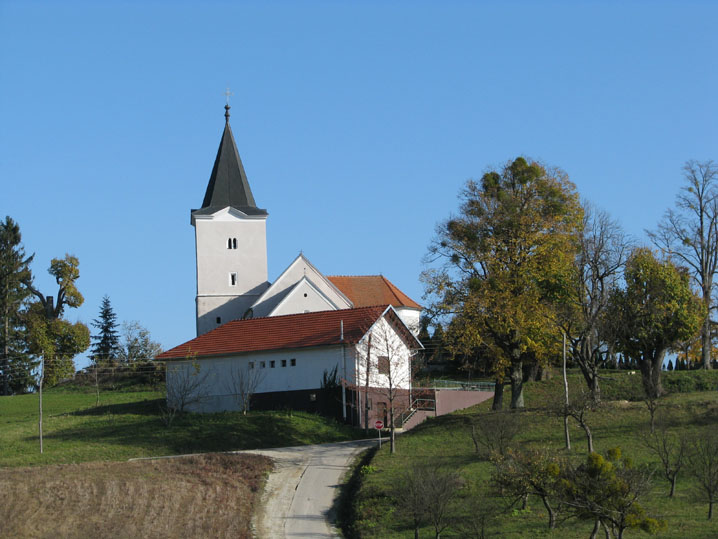
- Church in Zajezda, Budinščina municipality, Krapina-Zagorje County
- Interactive map of Zajezda
- Location within Krapina-Zagorje County Location within Croatia
- Coordinates: 46°09′30″N 16°11′30″E
- Country: Croatia
- County: Krapina-Zagorje County
- Municipality: Budinščina

Area
  - Total: 16.9 km^{2} (6.5 sq mi)

Population (2021)
  - Total: 293
  - Density: 17.3/km^{2} (44.9/sq mi)
- Time zone: UTC+1 (CET)
  - Summer (DST): UTC+2 (CEST)

Zajezda is a village in northern Croatia, located north of Budinščina and the D24 road, south of the Ivanšćica and east of Novi Marof.

== Notable people ==
- Josip Posavec – footballer
- Ferdo Ivanek – electrical engineer, father of actor Željko Ivanek
