= Sebastian Monroe (model) =

American fashion model (1985–2019)

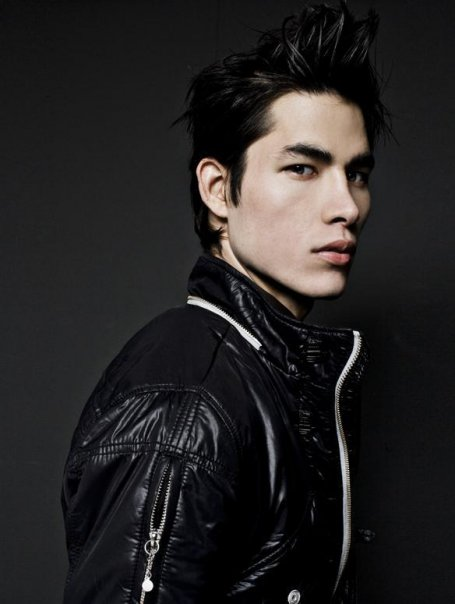
- Sebastian Monroe
- Born: United States
- Occupation: Model
- Years active: 2008–2010

Sebastian Monroe was an American fashion model who appeared in advertisements for Calvin Klein and Diesel (brand).

He debuted Misomber Nuan and "Fettile Derelicts" by Gian Romano who showcased his collection at Singapore's Audi Fashion Festival.

Monroe is of German and Irish descent with Korean and Native American ancestry.

Sebastian Monroe was born 21 April 1985 and died 13 March 2019.
