= Revolution (TV series) =

2012–2014 US post-apocalyptic science fiction TV series

- Genre: Post-apocalyptic; Action-adventure; Science fiction; Drama
- Created by: Eric Kripke
- Starring: Billy Burke; Tracy Spiridakos; Giancarlo Esposito; Zak Orth; David Lyons; Daniella Alonso; Anna Lise Phillips; Graham Rogers; J. D. Pardo; Tim Guinee; Maria Howell; Stephen Collins; Elizabeth Mitchell
- Theme music composer: J. J. Abrams
- Composer: Christopher Lennertz
- Country of origin: United States
- Original language: English
- No. of seasons: 2
- No. of episodes: 42 (list of episodes)

Production
- Executive producers: Bryan Burk; Eric Kripke; J. J. Abrams; Rockne S. O'Bannon; Jon Favreau
- Producers: Athena Wickham; Robert M. Williams Jr.; Trey Callaway
- Production locations: Atlanta, Georgia (Pilot); Wilmington, North Carolina (season 1); Austin, Texas (season 2)
- Cinematography: Michael Bonvillain
- Camera setup: Multi-camera
- Running time: 43 minutes
- Production companies: Kripke Enterprises; Bad Robot; Bonanza Productions; Warner Bros. Television

Original release
- Network: NBC
- Release: September 17, 2012 – May 21, 2014

Revolution (stylized as REVOLUTI⏻N) is an American post-apocalyptic science fiction television series that ran from September 17, 2012, until May 21, 2014, when it was cancelled by NBC. The show takes place in the post-apocalyptic near-future of the year 2027, 15 years after the start of a worldwide, permanent electrical-power blackout in 2012. Created by Eric Kripke and produced by J. J. Abrams' Bad Robot for the NBC network, it originally aired on Mondays at 10:00 p.m. ET, and did well enough that NBC ordered a second season shortly after the first-season finale.

Film director Jon Favreau directed the pilot episode. In October 2012, NBC picked it up for a full season of 22 episodes, which was later reduced to 20 episodes. Season 1 of the show was filmed in and around Wilmington, North Carolina. Many of the scenes were shot in historic downtown Wilmington and on the campus of the University of North Carolina Wilmington. On April 26, 2013, the series was renewed by NBC for a second season of 22 episodes to air in a new time slot of Wednesdays at 8 p.m. Season 2 of Revolution was filmed in and around Bartlett and Granger, Texas. The second-season premiere aired on September 25, 2013, and the finale aired on May 21, 2014. A four-part comic book series from DC Comics appeared in May and June 2015 to wrap up the story.

== Plot ==
=== Series overview ===
Season	Episodes	Originally released	
Season	Episodes	First released	Last released
1	20	September 17, 2012	June 3, 2013
2	22	September 25, 2013	May 21, 2014

=== Season 1 ===
The series is set in a post-apocalyptic near-future, in 2027. Fifteen years earlier, in 2012, a worldwide event known as "The Blackout" caused all electricity on Earth, ranging from computers and electronics to car and jet engines, to be disabled permanently. As a result, trains and cars stopped where they were, ships went dead in the water, and aircraft plummeted from the skies and crashed. In the years after the Blackout, people adapted to this new world without electricity.

The series begins with the surviving Matheson family; Ben and his two young adult children, daughter Charlie and son Danny, now live in a village near Chicago. Ben wears a small pendant around his neck that is the key not only to finding out what happened fifteen years ago, but also a possible way to reverse its effects. Sebastian Monroe, Monroe Militia general and self-appointed President of the "Monroe Republic", whose borders are the Mississippi River and the old states of Kentucky and the Carolinas, is searching for the pendants so he can use their power to take control of the entire North American continent. In the series' pilot, Ben Matheson is killed and Danny is abducted by Captain Tom Neville of the Militia. The remaining Matheson family, joined initially by Miles Matheson, Aaron Pittman, and Nora Clayton, now are on the run from the Monroe Militia. Monroe's new benefactor, Randall Flynn, a former U.S. Assistant Secretary of Defense who fifteen years earlier ordered deployment of the weaponized technology that caused the Blackout, now works with Monroe in his efforts after Ben's wife Rachel (working under duress for Monroe) escapes from his custody. This technology is later revealed to be a form of nanotechnology whose ability to drain electricity can be countered by the pendant.

Opening Introduction:

We lived in an electric world. We relied on it for everything. And then the power went out. Everything stopped working. We weren't prepared. Fear and confusion led to panic. The lucky ones made it out of the cities. The government collapsed. Militias took over, controlling the food supply and stocking up on weapons. We still don't know why the power went out. But we're hoping someone will come and light the way.

Season 1 Episode 5, "Soul Train", explains that government and public order collapsed after the blackout, leading areas that are ruled by militias and their generals. A map of the former continental United States, Canada, and Mexico is shown with the continent of North America divided into six "republics" (including parts of present-day Canada and Mexico along with the contiguous United States):

Post-blackout "republics" in North America
Nation	Description	Capital City
The Monroe Republic	Centered mainly in the American Northeast, it takes in the Great Lakes region, the Canadian Maritimes, extending as far north as the Gaspé Peninsula, and as south as the Virginias and Southern Illinois.	Philadelphia
The Georgia Federation	Encompassing the Southeast, it extends as far north as Kentucky and at least as west as New Orleans.	Atlanta
The Plains Nation	Covers the Great Plains (as far south as northern Arkansas and the Green Country) and the Rocky Mountains (as far as the Continental Divide in Montana), extending into the Canadian prairies.	Unknown
Texas	Includes Texas Proper along with large swaths of southern and western Oklahoma, southern Arkansas and all of Louisiana west of the Mississippi River, as well as the Mexican states of Coahuila, Nuevo León, and Tamaulipas.	Austin
The California Commonwealth	Located on the West Coast, incorporating California Proper, the Pacific Northwest as well as western and northern Idaho, much of British Columbia and all of Baja California.	Sacramento
The Wasteland	An unknown region concentrated mostly in the American Southwest, and includes Utah, Sonora and Chihuahua. Not much is revealed about it in the show.	None mentioned

In the same episode, it indicates that the Georgia Federation and Plains Nation have allied against the Monroe Republic; border skirmishing in southwest Illinois, near St. Louis, is also mentioned. According to the wife of Captain Thomas Neville (Julia) in a letter to her husband, the Monroe Republic capital of Philadelphia, Pennsylvania is relatively safe; however, life outside west of Pittsburgh is subject to rebel attacks and other dangers such as bandits. The fates of Alaska and Hawaii are not mentioned, while Mexico is shown to still exist, albeit in a much-reduced form.

=== Season 2 ===
In April 2013, the series was renewed for a second season of 22 episodes. The new season aired on Wednesdays at 8:00 pm (ET) as opposed to the previous time slot of Monday at 10:00 pm (ET). The season premiered on September 25, 2013, took a mid-season break before Thanksgiving 2013, and returned with new episodes on January 8, 2014.

Nicole Ari Parker was cast in a recurring role as Secretary Justine Allenford. Patrick Heusinger and Jessie Collins were also signed. Supernatural alumnus Jim Beaver was cast as John Franklin Fry, "a hard-ass, whip smart Texas Ranger who allies with Miles." The second season takes place six months after the events of the first season.

The themes and settings of the series change significantly in the second season. The Monroe Republic is no longer the primary enemy, being replaced by the Patriots. Sebastian Monroe becomes an ally (albeit an uneasy one) of the Matheson family, while the Nevilles are largely isolated from this group. The action of the main group of characters is centered on the town of Willoughby, in the nation of Texas. There is still considerable travel from this location (to the Plains Nation, the outpost called New Vegas, and to Mexico) but there is not a single continuing odyssey, as in the first season. The pendants and the Tower are no longer significant, with self-willed nanites becoming the major science-fictional element.

=== Planned season 3 ===
According to the show's creator, Eric Kripke, the third season was going to be different from the first two seasons:

It was going to be great. It was gonna be this kind of treasure story where they were going to hear a legend of a very mythic treasure. It wasn't gonna be gold, it was gonna be supplies. It was gonna be this incredible stockpile of supplies. All the good guys and all the bad guys in the show were going to fight for this gold mine of material and supplies. It was going to be fun. It wasn't going to be a war season. It was going to be a treasure hunt season, which would have been fun and mixed up the show in a really interesting way.

The third season was made into a four-part comic book series in 2015. It gave the ending and answered questions left from season 2.

== Characters ==
Promotional image showing the main characters of the 1st season

=== Main ===
- Miles Matheson (Billy Burke), a former U.S. Marine Corps Sergeant-turned-tavern owner, pursued by the Monroe Republic Militia. He is also the former commanding general of its militia, who became disillusioned with the Republic and unsuccessfully attempted to assassinate Monroe.
- Charlotte "Charlie" Matheson (Tracy Spiridakos), Ben Matheson's daughter and Miles's niece. She is very caring, but is increasingly at odds with trying to find a balance between concern and self-preservation in the post-blackout society, often choosing to emulate her Uncle Miles more than her own family.
- Rachel (née Porter) Matheson (Elizabeth Mitchell), Ben's wife and Charlie and Danny's mother, who is initially believed to have died following the blackout.
- Aaron Pittman (Zak Orth), an MIT graduate, former Google executive, and friend of Ben Matheson.
- Major Tom Neville (Giancarlo Esposito), a former insurance adjuster who joined the Monroe Republic militia after the blackout.
- Jason Neville/Nate Walker (J. D. Pardo), a lieutenant of the Monroe Militia tasked with tracking down Miles.
- President/General Sebastian "Bas" Monroe (David Lyons), a former U.S. Marine Corps sergeant who co-founded the Monroe Republic. President (de facto dictator) of the republic, as well as the commanding general of the militia.
- Nora Clayton (Daniella Alonso) (season 1, guest afterwards), a woman with connections to the rebels, who fight against the Monroe Republic to restore the United States of America.
- Dr. Gene Porter (Stephen Collins) (season 2), one of the civic leaders of the town of Willoughby, the town doctor and the father of Rachel Matheson.
- Danny Matheson (Graham Rogers) (episodes 1–11), Charlie's brother, an asthmatic who was constantly watched over by his sister.
- Grace Beaumont (Maria Howell) (series regular: 1 episode, recurring thereafter), a woman who hides Danny from the Monroe Militia and also has a pendant matching the one Ben Matheson gave Aaron.
- Ben Matheson (Tim Guinee) (season 1, guest afterward), Charlie and Danny's father. Along with Rachel he initially developed the nano-robot technology that caused the blackout, which was researched and developed by the other scientists including Grace, John and others.

=== Recurring ===
- Maggie Foster (Anna Lise Phillips) (episodes 1–4), a British medical doctor who became stranded and separated from her children following the blackout.
- Randall Flynn (Colm Feore), the Assistant Secretary of Defense who was working with Ben Matheson and his team to fund and support their project to weaponize Ben's research for military purposes.
- Jim Hudson (Malik Yoba), an ex-Monroe Militia captain who helped Miles with his initial assassination attempt on Bass and defected after their failure.
- John Sanborn (Leland Orser), a scientist who worked with Ben and Rachel in developing the blackout technology.
- Julia Neville (Kim Raver), Tom Neville's wife and Jason's mother.
- Jeremy Baker (Mark Pellegrino), a militia captain and former friend of Miles Matheson.
- Will Strausser (David Meunier), a sergeant in the Monroe Militia.
- Priscilla Pittman (Maureen Sebastian), Aaron's ex-wife.
- President Kelly Foster (Leslie Hope), the President of the Georgia Federation.
- Secretary Justine Allenford (Nicole Ari Parker), a now-renegade member of the Patriots.
- Cynthia (Jessica Collins), Aaron's girlfriend.
- Edward Truman (Steven Culp), a member of the Patriots.
- John Franklin Fry (Jim Beaver), a Texas Ranger.
- Titus Andover (Matt Ross), the leader of a war clan, attacking the town of Willoughby.
- Dr. Calvin Horn (Željko Ivanek), a member of the Patriots.
- Commander Roger Allenford (David Aaron Baker), a member of the Patriots and the husband of Justine Allenford. It was later implied that Roger was shot and killed by President Davis for his failures.
- Martin Shaw (Waleed Zuaiter), the member of the Patriots, who recruited Gene Porter.
- Connor Bennett (Mat Vairo), Sebastian Monroe's son.
- Victor Doyle (Christopher Cousins), a member of the Patriots and Julia's new husband.
- President Jack Davis (Cotter Smith), a ruthless, tyrannical President of the United States and a dictatorial leader of the Patriots.
- Duncan Page (Katie Aselton), the leader of a tribe in New Vegas and former associate of Monroe.
- Peter Garner (Daniel Henney), a former MIT student and friend of Aaron and Priscilla Pittman.
- Scanlon (Billy Lush), a member of Duncan's tribe.
- General Bill Carver (Anthony Ruivivar), the President of Texas.
- General Frank Blanchard (M. C. Gainey), a former President of Texas, who retired before General Carver was elected.
- Malcolm Dove (Barry Tubb)
- Militia Soldier (Zeeko Zaki)

== Production ==
Executive producer J. J. Abrams told the Los Angeles Times' Hero Complex blog that series creator Eric Kripke:

came to us with an idea that was undeniably good. It was such a great premise for a series that it was just that feeling of the misery that you'd feel if you had a chance to be part of that and didn't take advantage of it. I'm really looking forward to that show. He's so obviously the real deal, and we're just really lucky and honored that he wanted to collaborate with us on it.

The series – described by its creators as a "romantic swashbuckling sci-fi adventure" – debuted in the United States on September 17, 2012. In October 2012, NBC announced it would pick up the series for an additional nine episodes after achieving an average of 9.8 million viewers for the first three episodes. After November 26, 2012, Revolution went on hiatus for a holiday break and to catch up on post-production. Following this, the show resumed broadcast on March 25, 2013, for the remaining episodes of season 1.

The role of Rachel Matheson was originally played by Andrea Roth until she was replaced by Elizabeth Mitchell. A portion of episode 4 of season 1 was filmed at Freestyle Music Park in Myrtle Beach, South Carolina.

Revolution was renewed for a full 22-episode second season in April 2013. Production for season two moved to Austin, Texas. On May 9, 2014, NBC canceled the series after two seasons.

== Post cancellation ==
About the show’s cancellation, Eric Kripke said: "Any time a show gets canceled, you shed a tear just because you put so much effort into it. I would say looking back, I feel like my primary emotion was relief. It was such a hard show, and I forgot every lesson I learned with Supernatural. It was completely serialized. There was no engine. There was no clean path. But it was still a network show. Like, had that show been an eight-episode streaming show with a bigger budget? It would have been called The Last of Us [laughs]. It would have been good! Like, people ask me there, 'What do you think of The Last of Us?' I'm like, 'Oh, it's like if Revolution was good.' But trying to do 20 episodes of Revolution was just so, so hard and took two years out of my life. So as much as I love those actors and missed that show, I didn't miss the feeling that I was slowly dying every day.

== Release ==
=== Broadcast ===
In Canada, the series aired simultaneously with the American broadcast on City. It premiered in Australia on Fox8 in September 2012 and re-screened on free-to-air on Nine and Go! from November 2013. It premiered in New Zealand on TV2 on October 16, 2012. The series was broadcast by DSTV in South Africa and to the rest of Africa via satellite; it was delayed by a week from the US broadcast. In the United Kingdom, the series started airing on Sky1 from March 29, 2013.

=== Advance screenings ===
In the summer of 2012, NBC had a voting campaign on Revolution's Facebook page where visitors could vote for which American city should have an advance screening of the series' pilot in early September. The top ten markets selected were Atlanta, Boston, Chicago, Denver, Los Angeles, Minneapolis, New York City, Philadelphia, Salt Lake City, and Seattle.

On September 4, 2012, New York City's advance screening was held for 1,000 guests, with 80 of them seated on stationary bicycles to generate electricity for lighting. The remaining cities' screenings were held two days later, on September 6, 2012.

== Reception ==
=== Ratings ===
Viewership and ratings per season of Revolution
Season	Timeslot (ET)	Episodes	First aired		Last aired		TV season	Viewership rank	Avg. viewers (millions)
Season	Timeslot (ET)	Episodes	Date	Viewers (millions)	Date	Viewers (millions)	TV season	Viewership rank	Avg. viewers (millions)
1	Monday 10:00 pm	20	September 17, 2012	11.65	June 3, 2013	6.17	2012–13	33	10.53
2	Wednesday 8:00 pm	22	September 25, 2013	6.81	May 21, 2014	4.13	2013–14	63	6.96

=== Critical response ===
The first season holds a 55% "Rotten" score on review aggregator Rotten Tomatoes, based on 55 reviews with an average rating of 6.3/10. The website's critics consensus reads, "Revolution could work harder to be more realistic and relevant, but it still manages to intrigue with suspense, mystery, and good old-fashioned action." Metacritic, which uses a weighted average, gave the season a score of 64 out of 100 based on 32 reviews, indicating "generally favorable" reviews. Glen Garvin of The Miami Herald described the show as "big, bold and brassy adventure, a cowboys-and-Indians story for end times". Dorothy Rabinowitz of The Wall Street Journal praised the production quality of the pilot: "If the quality of this one, so irresistible in its vitality and suspense, does fail to hold up, its creators will have delivered, at the least, one remarkably fine hour." Ed Bark observed that the show "has the overall look and feel of a big budget feature, delivers some consistently terrific action scenes". The New York Post compared the show to Dies the Fire, The Hunger Games, and Lost. Verne Gay of Newsday gave the premiere a negative review: "There's an almost overwhelming been-there-seen-that feel to the pilot, which doesn't really offer any suggestion of 'well, you haven't seen this.'"

The second season received more positive reviews. Rotten Tomatoes reported a 79% approval rating with an average rating of 7.8/10, based on 14 reviews. The website's critics consensus reads, "Revolution's second season offers a welcome course correction from its uneven predecessor, adding new narrative wrinkles while refocusing on the show's stronger elements."

=== Awards and nominations ===
Awards and nominations for Revolution
Year	Association	Category	Nominee	Result
2012	People's Choice Awards	Favorite New TV Drama	Crew	Nominated
2012	Satellite Awards	Best Television Series, Genre	Revolution	Nominated
2013	Saturn Awards	Best Network Television Series	Revolution	Won (Note: Tied with Hannibal)
2013	Saturn Awards	Best Actor on Television	Billy Burke	Nominated
2013	Saturn Awards	Best Actress on Television	Tracy Spiridakos	Nominated
2013	Saturn Awards	Best Supporting Actor on Television	Giancarlo Esposito	Nominated
2013	Emmy Awards	Outstanding Visual Effects in a Supporting Role	Episode: Pilot	Nominated
2013	Emmy Awards	Outstanding Stunt Coordination for a drama series, miniseries or movie	Episode: Nobody's Fault But Mine	Won
2013	BMI TV Music Awards	Composer	Christopher Lennertz	Won
2013	TV Guide Awards	Favorite New Series	Revolution	Nominated
2014	Emmy Awards	Outstanding Stunt Coordination for a drama series, miniseries or movie	Jeff Wolfe	Nominated

== Digital comic ==
In May 2015, DC Comics started releasing a new digital comic book which picks up where the television series left off. Eric Kripke announced the digital comics revival on April 15, 2015. Between May 4 and June 15, 2015, four separate digital chapters were released fortnightly. Each of the four chapters have a specifically designed cover, all illustrated by DC Comics artist Angel Hernandez.

The four chapters were available on comicbook.com as well as on the TV series' Facebook page.

== See also ==
- Dies the Fire
- One Second After
- Ravage (novel)
- The Changes (TV series)
- Power symbol
- Escape from L.A., a movie ending with a worldwide blackout
- July 2012 solar storm, an event that almost caused a worldwide blackout in real life
