= Omar Little =

Character from The Wire

- The Wire character
- Michael K. Williams as Omar Little
- First appearance: "The Buys" (2002)
- Last appearance: "Clarifications" (2008)
- Created by: David Simon
- Portrayed by: Michael K. Williams

In-universe information
- Gender: Male
- Occupation: Stick-up man
- Family: Josephine (grandmother); Anthony "No Heart" Little (brother)
- Significant others: Brandon Wright (season 1); Dante (seasons 2–3); Renaldo (seasons 4–5)

Omar Devone Little is a fictional character on the HBO crime drama series The Wire, portrayed by Michael K. Williams. He is a notorious Baltimore stick-up man who frequently robs street-level drug dealers. He is legendary around the inner city for his characteristic duster, under which he hides his shotgun, large caliber handgun, and bulletproof vest, as well as for his facial scar and his whistling of "A-Hunting We Will Go" (a.k.a. "The Farmer in the Dell" (Note: Sometimes, the tune is characterized as "The Farmer in the Dell", as in "The Pager" (season 1, episode 5), when he concludes with, "the cheese stands alone".)) when stalking targets.

Omar's homosexual character is based on the heterosexual Baltimore area robber and hitman Donnie Andrews. Andrews served 18 years in prison after murdering a drug dealer. Andrews was married to Francine Boyd, who inspired the miniseries The Corner on HBO.

Both the character and Williams's performance have received critical acclaim, with Omar frequently being regarded as one of the greatest and most iconic television characters of all time.

== Character biography ==
When people see or hear him approaching, they run away and will often warn others by shouting "Omar comin'!" Omar has a strict moral code, which involves refusal to harm innocent "civilians" and distaste (usually) for profanity, setting him apart from other street-level characters. His homosexuality and privately tender nature starkly contrast with typical notions of machismo attached to violent criminals. Omar cares for his grandmother and is seen escorting her to church on Sunday mornings. He also has a tendency to refer to himself in the third person.

Omar steadily descends into intractable conflict with the Barksdale and Stanfield Organizations, started by his robberies. Omar is also noted for his close relationships with his partners, and with his guardian, ad hoc banker, and close friend Butchie.

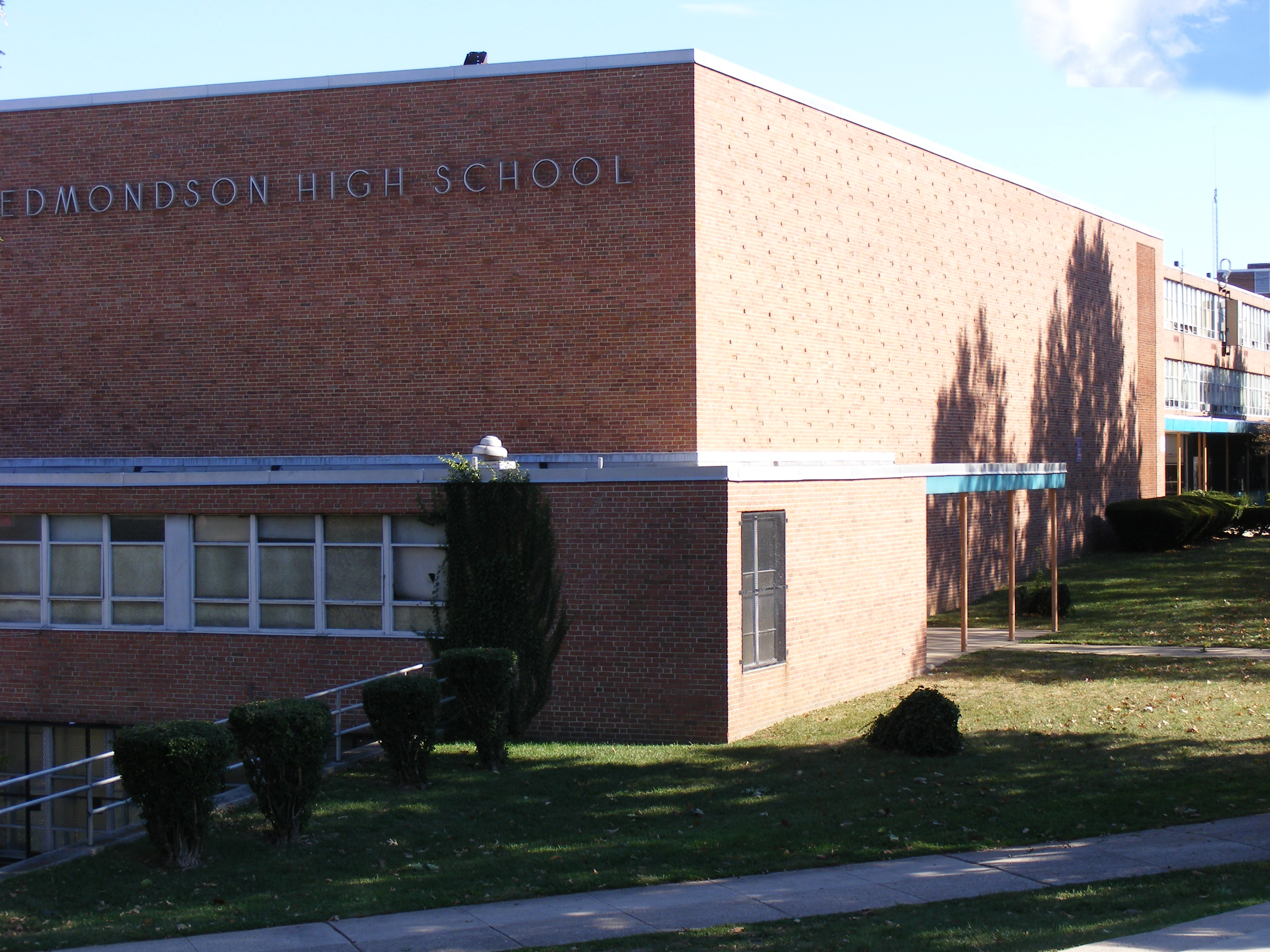
Edmondson High School, which Little attended

In "Clarifications", it is stated that Omar is 34 years old. He was orphaned at a young age and raised by his grandmother Josephine, who was largely responsible for his strict moral code, despite his criminal occupation. (Note: Omar tells his grandmother that he works at a cafeteria, at the airport.) He attended Edmondson High School in West Baltimore, a few years behind Bunk Moreland.

For more than 15 years, Omar made his living holding up drug dealers and staying alive "one day at a time". He repeatedly demonstrated exceptional skill at surveillance, and as a stick-up man and shooter, further contributing to his feared status as an efficient professional. Omar is highly intelligent and cunning, and consistently executes well-laid plans, anticipating his adversaries' moves and outsmarting them. He had a brother, "No Heart" Anthony, who was incarcerated for a jewelry store robbery in the early 1990s.

== Season 1 ==
After Omar, his boyfriend Brandon, and John Bailey rob a stash house, Avon Barksdale puts out a contract on the trio, doubling the reward once he discovers Omar is gay. Bailey is killed, and Brandon is tortured, mutilated, and killed for keeping silent on Omar's whereabouts. He is then left in a public place so as to be seen and quickly found. In response, Omar, emotionally distraught, cooperates with Detectives Jimmy McNulty and Kima Greggs.

Omar provides key information leading to the arrest of Barksdale's soldier Bird, and agrees to be a witness against him at his trial (though it is unlikely that Omar was an actual witness to the crime). While meeting with the police, he observes information which he uses to exact further revenge against the Barksdale Organization, killing Stinkum and wounding Wee-Bey Brice. McNulty and Bunk are forced to mislead Cole, the detective assigned to Stinkum's murder, in order to protect Omar.

Omar gets a shot at Avon himself, by giving stolen drugs to Eastside drug kingpin Proposition Joe for Avon's pager number. He tails Avon to Orlando's strip club, pages him and waits for him to emerge into the open. Avon narrowly escapes when Wee-Bey arrives and shoots Omar in the shoulder. Afterward, Stringer Bell offers Omar a truce, planning to kill him when he relaxes his guard. Omar, who has been wired up by McNulty for the meeting, realizes Stringer's duplicity and leaves town, temporarily relocating to New York City. In the last scene of the first season, he is seen robbing a drug dealer in the Bronx, merely saying that it's "all in the game, yo. All in the game."

== Season 2 ==
Omar returns to Baltimore with a new boyfriend, Dante. He returns to his old business, targeting the Barksdales exclusively, and connects with Tosha and Kimmy, stick-up artists who join his crew.

Omar provides false testimony against Bird in open court as he had promised to do. Unabashed and unapologetic about who he is, he wins over the jury with his wit. When the Barksdales' shady attorney Maurice Levy attempts to discredit Omar by calling him a parasite who thrives on the drug trade, Omar fires back that Levy is just as culpable. Levy works intimately with the Barksdale organization as its corrupt attorney, often providing legal guidance and sensitive information.

In the end, the jury believes Omar's testimony, and Bird is sent to prison for life. Assistant State's Attorney Ilene Nathan promises Omar a favor as a thank you for his testimony. While waiting to be called to the witness stand, Omar helps the bailiff with a crossword puzzle clue, explaining that the Greek god of war is called Ares. He mentions that he was fascinated by Greek mythology in middle school.

Around this time, as Stringer Bell starts making business decisions on his own for the Barksdale operation, Avon hires Brother Mouzone from New York as new muscle. With the threat to his secret dealings apparent, Stringer arranges a meeting with Omar and tells him that Mouzone was the one who had tortured and killed Brandon. Omar finds Mouzone and shoots him once, but when Mouzone reveals that Omar had been given false information, Omar realizes he has been duped and lets Mouzone live, even calling the paramedics for him. He redirects his murderous intent at Stringer himself.

== Season 3 ==
Omar and his crew continued robbing the Barksdale stash houses, even though they are more difficult and risky than other potential targets. Tosha is killed during one such raid on a Barksdale house, and Omar contemplates giving up his war against the Barksdale organization. Bunk, investigating the deaths, makes Omar feel further guilt over the incident, giving a speech about how the neighborhood used to be closer-knit and with less violence. "And now all we got are bodies. And predatory motherfuckers like you."

Bunk mentions that when he went to the scene, he found children arguing about whose turn it was "to be Omar." As a way of making amends with Bunk, Omar arranges the recovery of Kenneth Dozerman's service pistol, which Bunk had been tasked with finding.

Under orders from Stringer Bell, two of Avon's soldiers open fire on Omar while he is taking his grandmother to church. Omar forces her into a taxi, but she loses her best hat in the gunfire. This blatant violation of the longstanding "Sunday truce" between rival gangs, combined with the risk Omar's grandmother was put in during the incident, leads Omar to rededicate himself to war with the Barksdales, though Kimmy opts out. Avon, outraged at Stringer, forces the men responsible for the attack to buy Omar's grandmother a new hat.

Meanwhile, Brother Mouzone captures Dante, and forces him to reveal Omar's hiding place. Dante gives in, in contrast with Brandon, who never cracked. Mouzone suggests an alliance against Stringer. Together, Omar and Mouzone ambush Stringer during a meeting with Andy Krawczyk and murder him.

Brother Mouzone sets Dante free and returns to New York. Omar is tasked with disposing of Mouzone's gun, as well as the shotgun that killed Stringer. Both weapons are later thrown into the harbor. Omar is shown to be suspicious of the severity of Dante's injuries and his release by Mouzone is the last time he is seen. It is implied that Omar left him for giving him up so easily.

== Season 4 ==
Omar feels dissatisfied with how easy work has become after the collapse of the Barksdale organization and worries that pursuing easy thefts would make him soft ("How you expect to run with the wolves come night when you spend all day sparring with the puppies?"). He and new boyfriend Renaldo pull a robbery of one of Marlo Stanfield's dealers, Old Face Andre, who runs a westside corner convenience store that was actually a drug front.

At Proposition Joe's suggestion, they rob a poker game, not knowing that Marlo Stanfield is participating there. While committing the robbery, Omar makes a point to take a large ring from Marlo, who had earlier taken the same ring from Old Face Andre as a debt for money owed. Though Marlo vows revenge, his right-hand man Chris Partlow convinces him to take a subtler approach.

Chris kills a deliverywoman during a staged robbery at Old Face Andre's store and instructs Andre to call the police and falsely implicate Omar as the culprit. Omar is subsequently jailed. During the arrest, he is robbed by Officer Eddie Walker, who takes the ring that Omar had stolen from Marlo. Before Omar is taken away in a police van, he is questioned by McNulty, who finds it out of character for Omar to have murdered an ordinary citizen not involved in the drug trade.

While imprisoned in Baltimore City's Central Booking, Omar is recognized by other inmates he'd previously robbed, a number of whom want to kill him for the bounty placed on his head. In retaliation for an attempt on his life, he brutally stabs his attacker in the rectum as a means of warning the other inmates not to attack him.

Omar reaches out to Bunk for help. Omar convinces Bunk that he would never kill a "citizen". After having Omar transferred to a safer prison in Harford County (calling in the favor from Ilene Nathan), Bunk and Vernon Holley revisit the crime scene and get Old Face Andre to recant his original statement. The charge against Omar is dropped. Bunk transports him out of Harford County with a warning: no more murders of anyone. Bunk threatens to bring up the unsolved murders at Omar's hands that he knew about, such as Stringer Bell, Stinkum, and Tosha if Omar was caught killing anyone else.

Omar learns that Marlo had framed him and was the one he had robbed at the card game. Omar demands that Proposition Joe help him rob Marlo, and Joe agrees to alert Omar when Joe's soldier Cheese is dropping off Marlo's package. Omar orchestrates an elaborate and successful hijacking of Joe's entire shipment of heroin as it enters port. As he had no wish to sell drugs on the street, he sells the heroin back to Proposition Joe at 20 cents on a dollar. Although the heist makes Omar a lot of money, it has all of the drug kingpins ready to put a contract on his head.

== Season 5 ==
After the heist, Omar and Renaldo move to San Juan, Puerto Rico. Marlo Stanfield has Butchie tortured and murdered while failing to learn where Omar is hiding. Word reaches Omar and he returns to Baltimore to punish those responsible. When told by Butchie's surviving bodyguard the torture Marlo's soldiers put him through, Omar angrily vows to "work them".

Omar ambushes Slim Charles and confronts him. Omar knows that Slim Charles' employer "Proposition Joe" Stewart knew of his connection to Butchie and believes Proposition Joe may have been responsible. Slim Charles is able to convince Omar of Proposition Joe's innocence and Omar targets Stanfield. Along with Butchie's friend Donnie, Omar decides to go after Stanfield's people as Stanfield himself has gone into hiding. Omar targets Monk.

Stanfield's soldiers spot Omar outside Monk's apartment and bait Omar and Donnie into an ambush. Once inside they are attacked by Chris Partlow, Snoop, Michael Lee, and O-Dog. During the shootout, Omar shoots O-Dog in the leg and Chris shoots Donnie in the head. Out of ammunition, Omar is forced to jump from the fourth-story window, breaking his leg in the process.

He continues his mission around the city in search of Marlo, limping and supporting his weight on a makeshift crutch improvised from a broom. He terrorizes and robs many of Marlo's corners and shoots or kills several members of Stanfield's crew including Savino Bratton. Instead of keeping the drugs or money for himself, he destroys them each time to show that his motive is vengeance, not profit. At the scene of every action, Omar calls out loudly for Marlo to meet him on the streets.

Kenard follows Omar into a Korean-owned convenience store. Omar, seeing the small boy, pays no attention to him. Kenard shoots Omar in the side of the head, killing him. This is a reference to some of the foreshadowing in Season 3 when Kenard is witnessed by Bunk imitating Omar at the Barksdale stash house shootout. News of Omar's death is received with mild amusement and indifference. Bunk shows some sympathy, which he brushes aside when he learns Omar was once again "on the hunt". McNulty and Lester Freamon react with mere curious interest and instead focus on a list of names found on Omar's body. The newspaper makes no mention of the incident for lack of printing space.

An employee at the morgue believes the identification tag on Omar's body has been switched with that of a white male on the neighboring table and swaps the tags (Omar's ID tag gives his age as 47, which contradicts the previous age given for him, which was 34). In the series finale, Michael Lee is seen wielding a shotgun, carrying on with Omar's legacy, while robbing Vinson and shooting him in the leg.

After Omar's death, the tale of his downfall became glorified. The simple murder by a child soon evolves to Omar fending off an army of police or New York gangsters during the finale. Kernard is eventually arrested by Detective Crutchfield.

== Prequels ==
A brief prequel released online before season 5 and in the season 5 DVD set features a young Omar, his brother Anthony, and an unidentified older boy planning and executing a robbery of a man at a bus stop in 1985 Baltimore. Even as a young boy, Omar shows remarkable intelligence, morality, and force of character by first questioning the value of robbing the man and then compelling the unidentified older boy (at gunpoint) to return the money. Anthony expresses tired amusement at Omar's actions, demonstrating his familiarity with his brother's forceful personality. Omar is shown with his characteristic facial scar, indicating that he somehow received it as a child.

At the end of this segment, the unidentified boy tells Anthony that his brother is not "cut out" for their line of work, an ironic foreshadowing of what would happen to Anthony some years later. In season one, it is revealed that after bungling a jewelry store heist, Anthony was pursued by police. Apparently sensing he was about to be caught, and unwilling to do hard time, Anthony put a gun to his chest and pulled the trigger. He survived the suicide attempt, however, only receiving a contact wound. After this incident, he earned the derisive nickname "No Heart" Anthony.

== Production ==
=== Casting ===
Michael K. Williams was cast in the role of Omar after a single audition. Williams has stated that he pursued the role because he felt it would make him stand out from other African Americans from Brooklyn with acting talent because of its contradictory nature.

Williams expressed that his relationship with and love of off-Broadway New York theatres, such as the National Black Theater in Harlem, gave him the skill set needed for his portrayal of Omar, in particular using the Meisner technique to create Omar from the ground up, immersing himself by researching details of inner-city Baltimore. The role presented a particular challenge as it was the first major recurring television character he had played.

As part of his preparation for the role, Williams created playlists tailored to Omar's emotional and psychological state. He explained that music helped him stay grounded in the character's mindset. Songs on "Omar's playlist" included Lauryn Hill's "I Gotta Find Peace of Mind" and "Mystery of Iniquity", Tupac Shakur's "Dear Mama", Nas's "One Mic", and The Notorious B.I.G.'s "Who Shot Ya". Williams described the playlist as essential to channeling the character's internal conflict and moral complexity.

=== Origins ===
David Simon has said that Omar is based on Shorty Boyd, Donnie Andrews, Ferdinand Harvin, Billy Outlaw, and Anthony Hollie, Baltimore stickup men who robbed drug dealers in the 1980s through early 2000s. Donnie Andrews later reformed, got married and helped troubled youths. In season 4 of The Wire, Andrews plays one of the two men Butchie sends to help Omar in prison, in the episodes "Margin of Error" and "Unto Others", and Omar later meets with him at Blind Butchie's in "That's Got His Own" while planning the big drug robbery. Andrews died at age 58 in New York City on December 13, 2012, after suffering an aortic dissection.

Omar admits to an interest in Greek mythology in the season 2 episode "All Prologue". Omar's nascent love of Greek mythology has some truth in real life; according to a passage in David Simon and Ed Burns' non-fiction book, The Corner: A Year in the Life of an Inner-City Neighborhood, children in Baltimore schools pay little attention to most classes or stories (as seen in season 4 of The Wire), but are often interested in and appreciative of Greek mythology.

An earlier version of the Omar Little character appears in a season 3 episode of NYPD Blue, entitled "Hollie and the Blowfish". The episode, written by future-Wire creator David Simon, featured a character named Ferdinand Hollie who, like Omar, was a stickup artist who made his living boldly and brazenly robbing (often-powerful) drug-dealers, but still lived his life by a code of honor, and was willing to cooperate with the police. However, unlike Omar, Hollie's thefts were largely in support of his own drug addiction, and he is infected by HIV.

No mention is made of Hollie's sexual orientation, but a reference is made of a deceased running partner who has died of AIDS. Hollie is killed by the end of the episode, and like Omar, is mourned by police who alternately worked with him and pursued him. Detective Bobby Simone, at the end of the episode, beat up the detective who leaked the information that got Hollie killed.

Hollie shares his first name with Ferdinand Harvin and his last name with Anthony Hollie, two real-life Baltimore stickup men whom Simon has cited as inspirational sources for Omar Little.

== Reception ==
For his portrayal of Omar, Michael K. Williams was named by USA Today as one of ten reasons they still love television. The character was praised for his uniqueness in the stale landscape of TV crime dramas and for the wit and humor that Williams brought to the portrayal. Other commentators applauded the many dimensions of the character with his appearances in various story lines as " ... a sawed-off shotgun-toting terror, a vulnerable jailbird whose life lies in the balance, and a double crossing mastermind who outsmarts Baltimore's biggest drug dealers time and time again." He is widely regarded as one of the greatest television characters of all time.

Omar was named as one of the first season's richest characters, not unlike the Robin Hood of Baltimore's west side projects, although his contradictory nature was questioned as a little too strange. The Baltimore City Paper named the character one of their top ten reasons not to cancel the show and called him "arguably the show's single greatest achievement". Little appeared in Comcast's list of "TV's Most Intriguing Characters", with the website stating that "no character is more enigmatic and shocking than Omar".

Williams has stated that he feels that the character is well liked because of his honesty, lack of materialism, individuality and his adherence to his strict code. In January 2008 then-presidential candidate Barack Obama told the Las Vegas Sun that Omar was his favorite character on The Wire (which, in turn, is his favorite television show), adding, "That's not an endorsement. He's not my favorite person, but he's a fascinating character."

American voice-actor Matthew Mercer named his dog Omar, a Pembroke Welsh Corgi, after the character. In an interview with voice-actress Tawny Platis on YouTube, Mercer called Omar Little: "One of the greatest characters in modern media."
