= Michael K. Williams =

American actor (1966–2021)

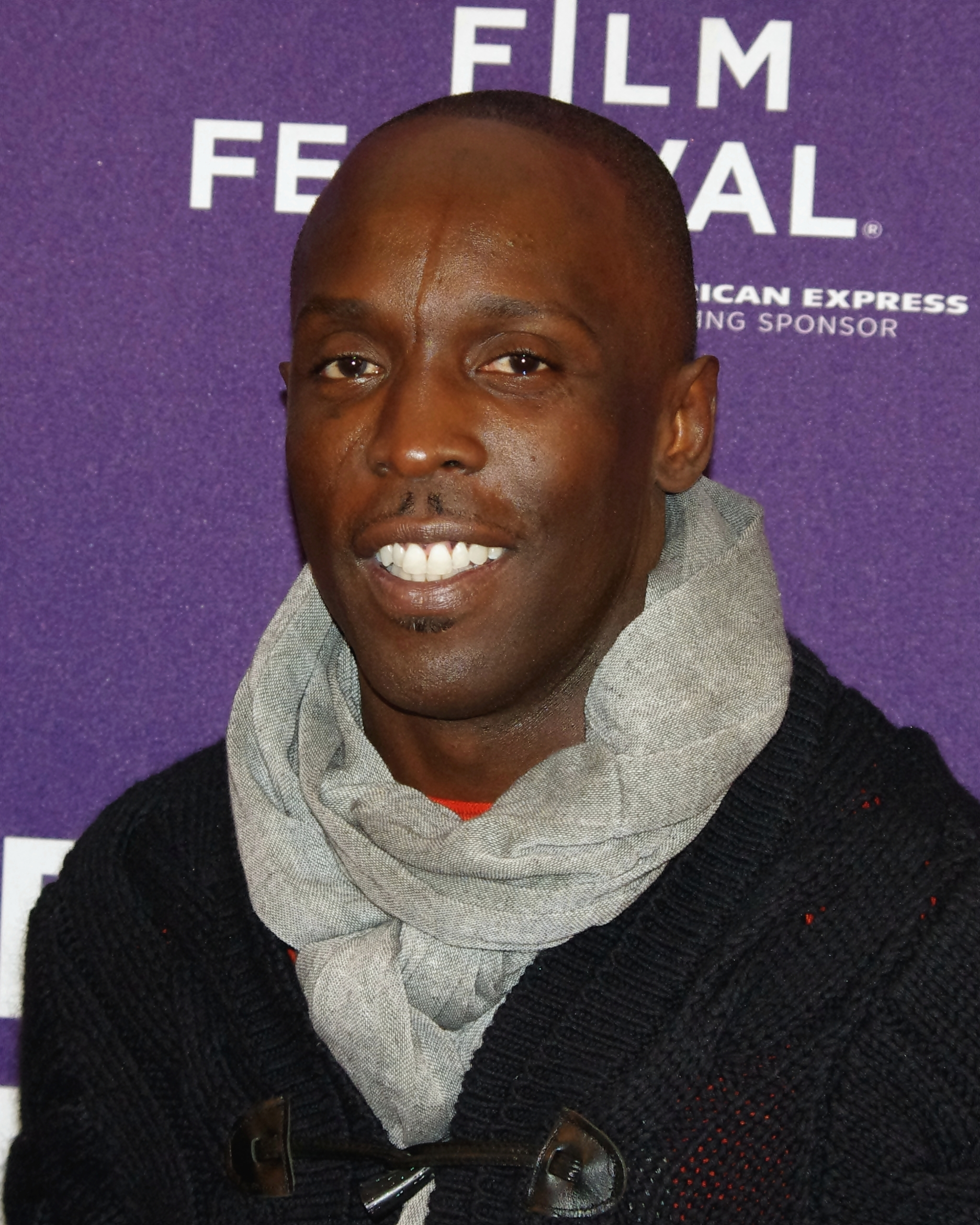
- Williams in 2012
- Born: Michael Kenneth Williams; November 22, 1966; New York City, U.S.
- Died: September 6, 2021 (aged 54); New York City, U.S.
- Occupation: Actor
- Years active: 1994–2021
- Children: 3
- Website: michaelkennethwilliams.com

Michael Kenneth Williams (November 22, 1966 – September 6, 2021) was an American actor. He rose to fame for his acclaimed portrayals of Omar Little on the HBO drama series The Wire (2002–2008), Albert "Chalky" White on the HBO series Boardwalk Empire (2010–2014), and Freddy Knight on the HBO series The Night Of.

Born in Brooklyn, New York City, to an African-American father from South Carolina and a Bahamian mother, Williams enrolled at the National Black Theatre. He left school early to pursue a career as a dancer, which resulted in his working with Kym Sims, George Michael, and Madonna, and found work choreographing music videos. His distinctive voice, prominent facial scar, and charisma helped him obtain acting work, initially alongside Tupac Shakur in the 1996 film Bullet before being cast in The Wire in 2002.

Williams earned five Primetime Emmy Award nominations for his performances in the HBO television biopic Bessie (2015), the Netflix drama series When They See Us (2019), the HBO crime series The Night Of (2016), and the HBO supernatural series Lovecraft Country (2020). He featured in Boardwalk Empire (2010-2014) as the character Chalky White. He had a recurring role in the NBC sitcom Community from 2011 to 2012. He also had supporting roles in a number of films including Gone Baby Gone (2007), The Road (2009), Inherent Vice (2014), and Motherless Brooklyn (2019), as well as starring roles in 12 Years a Slave (2013), Robocop (2014), The Purge: Anarchy (2014), The Gambler (2014), Triple 9 (2016), Ghostbusters (2016), and Assassin's Creed (2016).

During his career he acknowledged struggles with fame throughout his life, admitting that he had suffered from drug addictions during the height of his success. He continued to live in Brooklyn until his death in 2021 at age 54, after using heroin laced with a lethal amount of fentanyl. Four men were charged in the aftermath of his death with various crimes, including manslaughter.

== Early life and education ==
Michael Kenneth Williams was born on November 22, 1966, in Brooklyn, in New York City, the son of Bahamian-born Paula Thompson and Booker T. Williams, an African-American, from Greeleyville, South Carolina, where his family has deep roots. Williams was raised on New York Avenue near Vanderveer Projects in East Flatbush, and attended George Westinghouse Career and Technical Education High School. Later, Williams enrolled at the National Black Theatre in New York City.

== Career ==
=== 1994–2001: Early career and acting-debut ===
Williams worked for Pfizer pharmaceuticals as a temp. However, inspired by Janet Jackson's Rhythm Nation 1814, he left school and quit his job, against the wishes of his family, to pursue a career as a dancer. During a year in which he was intermittently homeless, Williams visited record labels and dance studios looking for work. He got a job as a background dancer with singer Kym Sims, which led to more work appearing as a dancer in music videos and on tours with artists such as George Michael and Madonna, as well as some modeling work. He also choreographed Crystal Waters' 1994 single "100% Pure Love".

Williams had a prominent vertically spanning forehead scar inflicted in a bar fight on his 25th birthday. The scar became his signature feature, and resulted in offers to perform as a thug in music videos and modeling opportunities with noted photographers like David LaChapelle. One of his first acting roles was alongside Tupac Shakur as High Top, the brother and henchman to Shakur's drug kingpin Tank, in the 1996 film Bullet. Shakur reportedly decided on Williams for the role after spotting a Polaroid photograph of him in a production studio.

=== 2002–2008: Breakthrough with The Wire ===
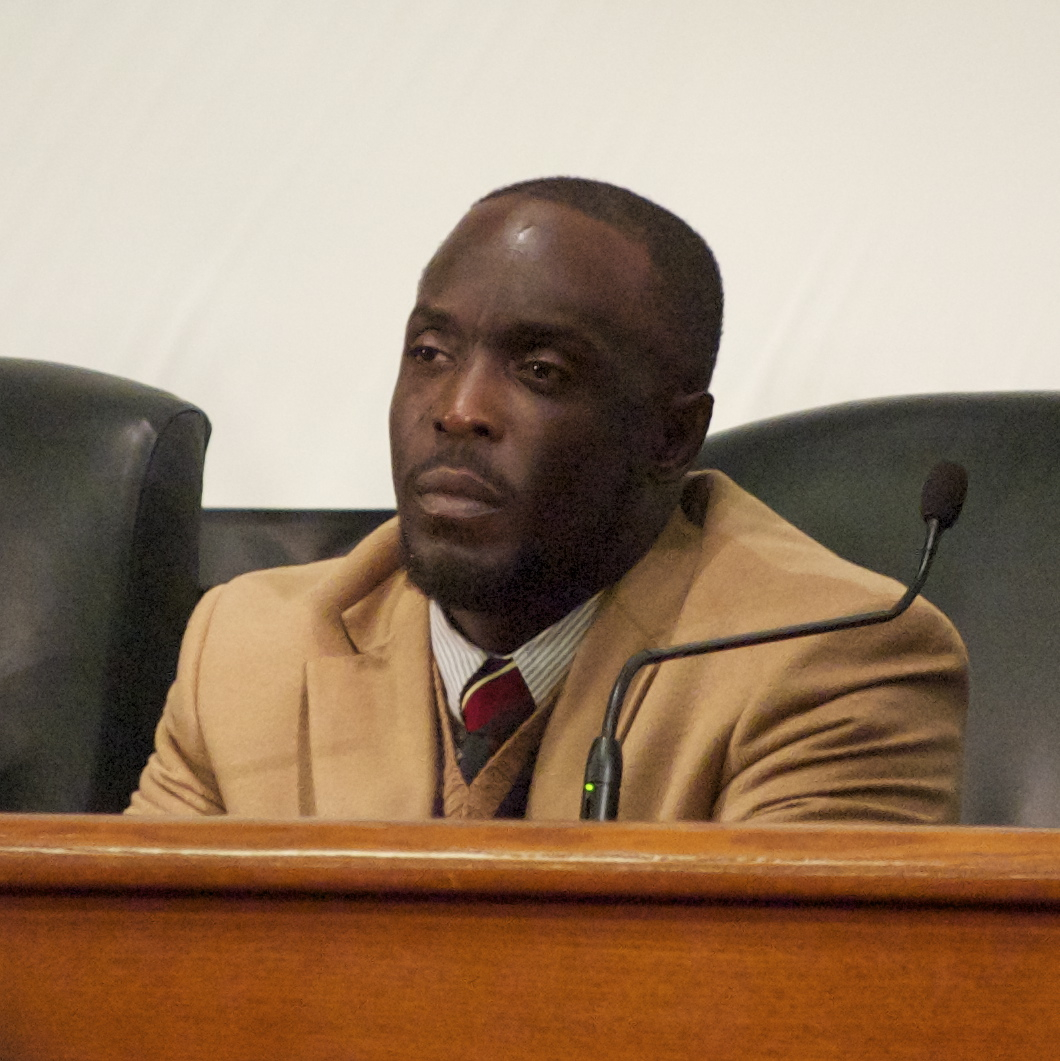
Williams at Harvard University for a panel discussion on The Wire, November 8, 2010

Williams gained recognition as an actor for his portrayal of Omar Little in The Wire, which began filming in 2002. The character was based on Donnie Andrews, along with other crime figures in Baltimore. Williams received the part after a single audition, at the encouragement of writer Ed Burns. He was told that the character was slated to appear in just seven episodes and expected him to be killed by the end of the first season. However, creator David Simon stated that they always planned to keep the character as part of the continuing ensemble should the show be renewed beyond one season.

For his portrayal of Omar, Williams was named by USA Today as "one of ten reasons they still love television". The magazine praised Omar for his uniqueness as a character, and Williams for bringing wit and humor to the portrayal. Omar has been named as one of the first season's richest characters, a Robin Hood of Baltimore's west side projects. The Baltimore City Paper named the character one of their top ten reasons not to cancel the show and called him "arguably the show's single greatest achievement". In 2007, he was nominated for an NAACP Image Award for Outstanding Actor in a Drama Series for his role as Omar.

Williams pursued the role because he was intrigued by Omar's contradictory nature. He felt Omar's popularity stemmed from his honesty, lack of materialism, individuality and his adherence to his strict code. He felt that the role has been a breakthrough in terms of bringing attention to him and getting further roles. Williams received both positive and negative reactions to Omar's homosexuality and felt that he was successful in challenging attitudes and provoking discussion with the role. In 2008, then-U.S. Senator Barack Obama cited The Wire as his favorite television show, and called Omar his favorite character. About Omar, Obama said, "That's not an endorsement. He's not my favorite person, but he's a fascinating character ... he's the toughest, baddest guy on the show."

Williams had a recurring role on J. J. Abrams' Alias. He also had a recurring role on the Abrams-produced Six Degrees. He made brief appearances on CSI: Crime Scene Investigation (playing two different characters on two different seasons), Boston Legal, The Sopranos, Law & Order (playing three different characters on three different seasons), Law & Order: Special Victims Unit (also playing two different characters on two different seasons), Human Giant, and Third Watch. Williams appeared in The Kill Point as recurring guest star Q, a police sniper, alongside The Wire co-stars J. D. Williams, Michael Hyatt and Leo Fitzpatrick. He auditioned for the starring role of Mr. Cat but was forced to take a smaller role due to scheduling conflicts; the part of Mr. Cat went to J. D. Williams instead. Williams played a Boston area detective named Devin Amronklin in the 2007 film Gone, Baby, Gone. The film is based on a novel by Dennis Lehane, who has written for The Wire, and was adapted and directed by Ben Affleck. Amronklin is a recurring character in Lehane's Kenzie-Genarro series of books. Williams said that he enjoyed working with Affleck and characterized him as a passionate and hands-on director. Williams played Teddy, the former boyfriend of Nikki Tru (Kerry Washington) in the Chris Rock film I Think I Love My Wife. He played James, a policeman, in singer R. Kelly's video for "Trapped in the Closet". He also appeared in The Game's "Dreams" and "How We Do" music videos, Tony Yayo's "It's a Stick Up" music video and Cam'ron's film Killa Season, as well as Trick Daddy's video "Tuck Your Ice In", Freeway's "How We Do", Sheek Louch's "Good Love", and Young Jeezy's "Bury me a G" alongside his The Wire co-star Hassan Johnson. Williams played the role of The Thief in the 2009 film The Road, an adaptation of the Cormac McCarthy novel of the same name.

=== 2009–2020: Established work and final roles ===
In 2010, Williams appeared in the film Life During Wartime. The character he played, Allen, was portrayed by Philip Seymour Hoffman in the film's predecessor, Happiness. Williams starred in the film A Day in the Life, which was directed by, produced by, and starred rapper Sticky Fingaz. The entire film is a musical with every line being delivered in rap verse. Williams starred in HBO's Boardwalk Empire for its five seasons (2010–2014), appearing as Albert "Chalky" White, the leader of 1920s' Atlantic City's black community.

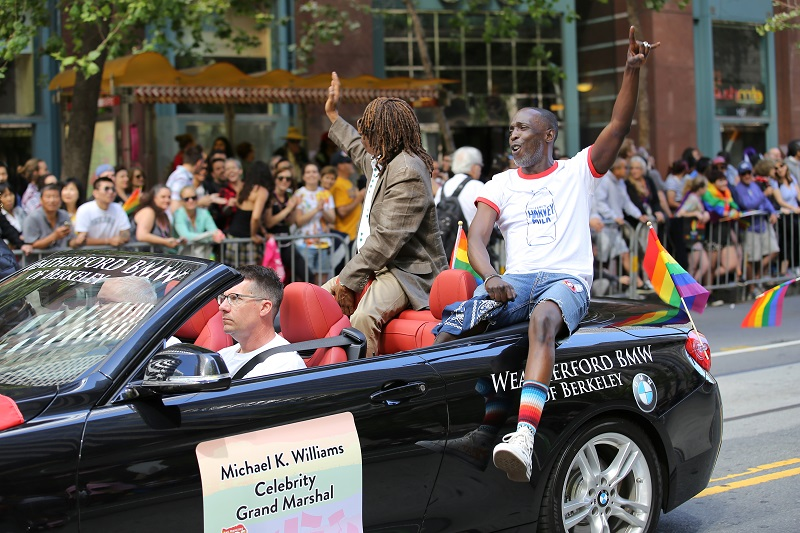
Williams on the float as the Celebrity Grand Marshal at the 2016 San Francisco Pride Parade

On July 23, 2011, Community creator Dan Harmon revealed that Williams would star in "at least three episodes" of the sitcom's third season. He played the role of Biology Professor Marshall Kane at Greendale Community College. In November 2011, it was announced that Williams would appear in Quentin Tarantino's feature film Django Unchained. Williams, who had previously confirmed that he was actually in talks with Tarantino to take on the titular role of Django, was to portray a minor character in the film, but scheduling conflicts with Boardwalk Empire prevented him from doing so. On May 16, 2012, Williams announced that he was an executive producer of the independent film Snow on tha Bluff, Williams' first film under his company, Freedome Productions. On Power 105.1fm's The Breakfast Club, Williams revealed the June 19 release date for Snow on tha Bluff, describing the movie as "real graphic": "everything that is wrong with the 'hood is in this movie". Williams also shared on The Breakfast Club that he was starring in an African American western, They Die by Dawn, with his co-star Snoop from the HBO series The Wire. Williams also revealed that he was starring in the lead role as rapper Ol' Dirty Bastard (ODB) from the Wu-Tang Clan in the movie Dirty Whiteboy in 2014, which is based on the relationship ODB had with his manager during the last two years of his life. Williams mentioned the role was special to him because he grew up listening to Ol' Dirty Bastard and to Wu-Tang and was also a Brooklyn native. In 2013, Williams starred in MGMT's music video for "Cool Song No. 2" and had a cameo appearance in Jay-Z's "Picasso Baby" art film. That same year, Williams appeared in ASAP Rocky's video for "Phoenix". He was also featured modeling for The Gap's 2014 fall collection. In 2013, Williams was the voice actor and motion capture performer for the character Kimble "Irish" Graves in the video game Battlefield 4, reprising the role posthumously in 2022 for Battlefield 2042.

On March 9, 2015, it was announced that Williams would star in SundanceTV's Hap and Leonard, and he stayed with the series for its entire three-season run. Also in 2015, Williams appeared in the music video for "The Mephistopheles of Los Angeles" by Marilyn Manson. In 2016, Williams began working with Vice News, hosting a VICELAND program titled Black Market. In the series, he visited various clandestine markets to explore how they operate while investigating the circumstances that generate their clientele. In 2018, Williams again worked with the Vice team. In "Raised in the System", the extended premiere episode of the sixth season of HBO's Emmy-winning weekly news magazine series Vice, Williams embarked on a personal journey to expose the root of the American mass incarceration crisis: the juvenile justice system. Williams was originally cast as Dryden Vos, a crime lord, in Solo: A Star Wars Story, but exited the role after being unable to return for re-shoots due to scheduling conflicts with the film The Red Sea Diving Resort. Paul Bettany was cast in his place, with the character being reworked from a motion-capture alien to a human. In 2020, he played Montrose Freeman on the HBO series Lovecraft Country.

== Personal life ==
During his portrayal of Omar, Williams went by his character's name and developed a habit of smoking cannabis and an addiction to cocaine in 2004. Williams lived part-time in Newark, New Jersey, using drugs, but sought help from a ministry in neighboring Irvington, which he credited for helping him during the production.

== Death ==
On September 6, 2021, at the age of 54, Williams was found dead by his nephew at his apartment in the Williamsburg neighborhood of Brooklyn. On September 24, the Chief Medical Examiner of New York City ruled it a death by overdose and confirmed that Williams died of a combination of cocaine, fentanyl, heroin, and parafluorofentanyl. His private funeral was held at St. Stephen's Episcopal Cathedral in Harrisburg, Pennsylvania, where his mother lives. The Baltimore Ravens played a tribute to Williams by playing his character Omar Little's whistle of the song "The Farmer in the Dell" as part of the team intro all throughout the M&T Bank Stadium. Félix Bautista of the Baltimore Orioles began entering the game to Omar's whistle as a tribute.

In February 2022, police arrested four men in connection with Williams' death. In April 2023, drug dealer Irvin Cartagena pleaded guilty to selling the mix of heroin and fentanyl to Williams that resulted in his death. In July 2023, four men took guilty pleas and Carlos Macci, one of the men, was sentenced to 2.5 years in prison.

== Artistry and legacy ==
Williams also served as the American Civil Liberties Union celebrity ambassador to the Campaign for Smart Justice. Williams' portrayal of openly gay characters was deemed revolutionary. He has been described as a "singular presence, onscreen and off, who made every role his own". Williams's portrayal of Omar Little has been called one of the best in the history of television. His performance as Omar was widely-acclaimed, leading to praise from President Barack Obama and a nomination for NAACP Image Award for Outstanding Actor in a Drama Series in 2007. With The Wire and other shows such as The Sopranos, Williams was credited with being part of the late 1990s and early 2000s artistic force changing American television as an art-form. In the aftermath of his death, he was the subject of tributes and appraisal both in the United States and beyond; the British lecturer and writer Kenan Malik wrote of his "power and nuance, seldom seen on screen".

== Filmography ==
=== Film ===
List of Michael K. Williams film credits
Year	Title	Role	Notes
1996	Bullet	High Top	
1996	Mugshot	Rumor	
1998	The Substitute 2: School's Out	Gang Member (uncredited)	
1999	Bringing Out the Dead	Drug Dealer	
2000	Broke Even	Kenny	
2004	Doing Hard Time	Curtis Craig	Video
2005	Guile	Ken	Short
2005	Trapped in the Closet: Chapters 1–12	Sgt. James	Video short; part of the series Trapped in the Closet
2006	Bondage	Willie	
2006	Mercenary for Justice	Samuel Kay	Video
2006	5up 2down	Terance	
2007	Trapped in the Closet: Chapters 13–22	Sgt. James	Video short
2007	Trapped in the Closet: The BIG Package	Sgt. James	Video short (Chapters 1–22)
2007	I Think I Love My Wife	Teddy	
2007	Gone Baby Gone	Devin	
2008	The Incredible Hulk	Harlem Bystander	
2008	KeAnthony: A Hustlaz Story	Shawn	Short
2008	Belly 2: Millionaire Boyz Club	Tone	Video
2008	Miracle at St. Anna	Tucker (Scared Soldier)	
2009	Brooklyn's Finest	Red	
2009	Tell-Tale	Acherton	
2009	Wonderful World	Ibu	
2009	The Perfect Age of Rock 'n' Roll	Sonnyboy	
2009	A Kiss of Chaos	Demetrius	
2009	Addicts	Lil J	
2009	A Day in the Life	Killer Mike	
2009	The Road	Thief	
2009	Life During Wartime	Allen	
2011	Bayou Black	Willy Jones	Short
2011	You're Nobody 'til Somebody Kills You	A.D.	
2012	LUV	Det. Holloway	
2012	Crispus Attucks: Today Was a Good Day	Himself	Short
2012	W8 (Weight)	Derrick Jones / Dee	Short
2012	The Wire: The Musical	Omar Little	Short
2012	Nobody's Nobody's	Emeka	Short
2012	Trapped in the Closet: The Next Installment	Sgt. James	Video short (Chapters 23–33)
2013	Snitch	Malik	
2013	12 Years a Slave	Robert	
2013	Plant Hunter	Plant Hunter	Short
2013	They Die by Dawn	Nat Love	
2013	The Devil Goes Down	The Devil	Short
2013	Fairfield County	Leonard	Short
2014	RoboCop	Jack Lewis	
2014	The Purge: Anarchy	Carmelo Johns	
2014	Time Out of Mind	Mike	
2014	Kill the Messenger	Ricky Ross	
2014	Inherent Vice	Tariq Khalil	
2014	The Gambler	Neville Baraka	
2015	Anesthesia	Jeffrey	
2015	Captive	Det. John Chestnut	
2016	The Land	Pops	
2016	Triple 9	Sweet Pea	
2016	Ghostbusters	Agent Hawkins	
2016	When the Bough Breaks	Roland	
2016	Against the Wall	Man	Short
2016	Assassin's Creed	Moussa	
2017	Above the Noise		Short
2018	The Public	Jackson	
2018	Superfly	Scatter	
2019	The Red Sea Diving Resort	Kabede Bimro	
2019	Motherless Brooklyn	Trumpet Man	
2019	Father	Grandfather	Short
2019	About The People	The Senator	Short
2020	Arkansas	Almond	
2020	Critical Thinking	Mr. Roundtree	
2020	Beastie Boys Story	Bob Dylan	
2021	Body Brokers	Wood	
2022	Breaking	Eli Bernard	Posthumous release
2023	Surrounded	Will Clay	Posthumous release
2024	The Brown Dog	Nobody	Animated short; posthumous release

=== Television ===
List of Michael K. Williams television credits
Year	Title	Role	Notes
1997	Law & Order	Delmore Walton	Episode: "Shadow"
2001	Law & Order	Marcus Cole	Episode: "A Losing Season"
2001	Deadline	Darin	Episode: "The Undesirables"
2001	The Sopranos	Ray Ray	Episode: "Army of One"
2002	Third Watch	Cop #1	Episode: "Superheroes Part 2"
2002–2008	The Wire	Omar Little	Recurring cast (seasons 1–2), main cast (seasons 3–5); 42 episodes
2003	Law & Order: Special Victims Unit	Double-D Gamble	Episode: "Escape"
2005	Lackawanna Blues	Jimmy	TV movie
2005	Alias	Roberts	Recurring cast (season 4)
2005	Boston Legal	Randall Kirk	Episode: "Gone"
2005	CSI: Crime Scene Investigation	Ronnie	Episode: "Hollywood Brass"
2005–2012	Trapped in the Closet	Sgt. James	Chapters 1–12, Chapters 13–22, The BIG Package (Chapters 1–22), and The Next Installment (Chapters 23–33)
2006	Law & Order: Special Victims Unit	Victor Bodine	Episode: "Underbelly"
2006–2007	Six Degrees	Michael	Recurring cast
2007	The Kill Point	Quincy	Recurring cast
2008	Human Giant	Chris Barksdale	Episode: "Respect. Honor. Discipline."
2008	CSI: NY	Reggie Dunham	Episode: "The Box"
2009	Law & Order	Charles Cole	Episode: "Great Satan"
2009	The Philanthropist	Dax Vahagn	Main cast
2010	CSI: Crime Scene Investigation	Laurent Senyabou/Matthew Babajide	Episode: "World's End"
2010–2014	Boardwalk Empire	Chalky White	Main cast; 35 episodes
2011	Detroit 1-8-7	Clarence Warrenton	Episode: "Legacy/Drag City"
2011	Aqua Teen Hunger Force	Unnamed Citizen (voice)	Episode: "Allen Part Two"
2011	The Cookout 2	Cable Guy Mike	TV movie
2011–2012	Community	Dr. Marshall Kane	Recurring cast (season 3)
2013	Walk This Way	Rev. Daniels	Main cast
2013	High School USA!	Lucius (voice)	Episode: "Adderall"
2014	Lucas Bros. Moving Co.	Satan / Nigerian Dude (voice)	Episode: "A/C Tundra"
2014	I Love the 2000s	Himself	10 episodes
2015	Bessie	Jack Gee	TV movie
2015	The Spoils Before Dying	Rock Banyon	Main cast
2016	The Night Of	Freddy Knight	Main cast
2016, 2022	Black Market with Michael K. Williams	Himself	14 episodes
2016–2018	Hap and Leonard	Leonard Pine	Main cast
2017	When We Rise	Ken Jones	Main cast
2017–2021	F Is for Family	Smokey Greenwood (voice)	Recurring cast (seasons 2–5)
2018	The Guest Book	Gabe	Episode: "Someplace Other Than Here"
2018	Vice	Himself	Episode: "Raised in the System"
2019	Last Week Tonight with John Oliver	Richard Sackler	Episode: "Opioids II"
2019	When They See Us	Bobby McCray	Main cast
2020	Lovecraft Country	Montrose Freeman	Main cast

=== Theater ===
Year	Title	Role	Venue	Ref.
2007	The 24 Hour Plays	Gehring	American Airlines Theatre, Broadway	

=== Video games ===
List of Michael K. Williams video game credits
Year	Title	Role	Notes
2013	Battlefield 4	Sgt. Kimble "Irish" Graves	Voice and motion capture
2020	NBA 2K21	Archie Baldwin	Voice and motion capture
2021	Battlefield 2042	Cpt. Kimble "Irish" Graves	Posthumous; voice and motion capture

== Bibliography ==
In 2022, his autobiography Scenes From My Life was published. He died a few weeks before the manuscript was completed.
