= David Mills (TV writer) =

American journalist and TV writer (1961–2010)

- Born: David Eugene Mills; November 20, 1961; Washington, D.C., U.S.
- Died: March 30, 2010 (aged 48); New Orleans, Louisiana, U.S.
- Education: University of Maryland, College Park
- Occupations: Journalist, television writer
- Writing career
- Period: 1993–2010
- Notable works: The Corner, Kingpin

David Eugene Mills (November 20, 1961 – March 30, 2010) was an American journalist, writer and producer of television programs. He was an executive producer and writer of the HBO miniseries The Corner, for which he won two Emmy Awards, and the creator, executive producer, and writer of the NBC miniseries Kingpin.

== Early life ==
Mills was born in Washington, D.C. His family moved to Lanham, Maryland, after their home was destroyed by a fire. In 1979, Mills graduated from DuVal Senior High School in Lanham.

He had African American and Pamunkey heritage and was the nephew of artist Georgia Mills Jessup.

== Journalism ==
Mills attended the University of Maryland, where he was on the staff of The Diamondback, the independent student newspaper. He met frequent collaborator David Simon while working on The Diamondback. While he was a student, Mills published This Magazine, a tabloid that failed after three editions. Later, he and a group of his friends published Uncut Funk, a zine that focused on the music of George Clinton and Parliament-Funkadelic.

After graduating, Mills became a features writer. He worked for The Wall Street Journal, The Washington Times, and The Washington Post. Among the many articles he wrote, Mills produced a number of controversial celebrity interviews.

=== Professor Griff ===
In 1989, Mills interviewed Professor Griff, a member of the hip hop group Public Enemy, for the Washington Times. During the interview, Griff made a number of antisemitic remarks, leading to criticism of the group.

=== Sister Souljah ===
Mills spoke with activist and rapper Sister Souljah in 1992 for the Washington Post. During the interview, the two spoke about the race riots that had taken place weeks earlier in Los Angeles after a predominantly-white jury acquitted four police officers who had been videotaped while beating a black motorist named Rodney King following a high-speed car chase.

The most controversial portion of the interview came when Mills asked Souljah whether violence was a rational response to outrage. Imagining the thoughts of a participant in the riots, Souljah said that it was:

Mills: But even the people themselves who were perpetrating that violence, did they think it was wise? Was that wise, reasoned action? Souljah: Yeah, it was wise. I mean, if black people kill black people every day, why not have a week and kill white people? You understand what I'm saying? In other words, white people, this government, and that mayor were well aware of the fact that black people were dying every day in Los Angeles under gang violence. So if you're a gang member and you would normally be killing somebody, why not kill a white person? Do you think that somebody thinks that white people are better, or above and beyond dying, when they would kill their own kind?

Within weeks of the interview, Democratic presidential candidate Bill Clinton criticized Jesse Jackson and the Rainbow Coalition for inviting Souljah to speak at its convention. Quoting Souljah as saying "If black people kill black people every day, why not have a week and kill white people?" Clinton said that "if you took the words 'white' and 'black' and reversed them, you might think David Duke was giving that speech".

== Television ==
=== Homicide: Life on the Street ===
In 1993 Mills wrote the script for an episode of Homicide: Life on the Street. The network series was based on a book, Homicide: A Year on the Killing Streets, by David Simon, a college friend of Mills. Simon was also a writer and producer of the show.

The episode, called "Bop Gun", which featured Robin Williams as a guest star, aired in January 1994 as the second-season premiere. Mills named the episode after a Parliament song, "Bop Gun (Endangered Species)"; one of the criminals featured in the episode claimed he shot someone in anger over the destruction of a rare record by Eddie Hazel, a member of Funkadelic. This was the first of many P-Funk references that Mills would incorporate into his screenplays. Mills and Simon won the WGA Award for Best Writing in a Drama for "Bop Gun". Mills said of the episode, "That script inspired me to quit journalism. It was a golden opportunity, even though I didn't know what I was doing. I developed bad habits as a newspaper feature writer. I would always stretch a project to fill the available time." Mills wrote two more episodes for Homicide, one each in 1995 and 1998.

=== NYPD Blue ===
At a professional writer's seminar during 1994, David Milch, the co-creator of NYPD Blue, tried to explain why there were so few African-American screenwriters. He said that "in the area of drama, it was difficult for black American writers to write successfully for a mass audience". In response to Milch's comments, which were made public by The Washington Post, Mills wrote a letter in which he challenged Milch's assumptions concerning Black writers. As a result, Milch hired Mills as a writer for NYPD Blue.

Mills wrote nine episodes of NYPD Blue between 1995 and 1997. In one of those episodes, "Closing Time", recovering alcoholic Andy Sipowicz begins drinking again and is beaten by a group of young men who steal his gun. Before the men confront Sipowicz, they are arguing about whether Bootsy Collins or Larry Graham is the better bass player. This is another one of Mills's P-Funk references in his work.

Looking back on his experience working on NYPD Blue, Mills would later write, "Milch didn't hire me just to get Jesse Jackson off ABC's back. He gave me a shot, I rose to the occasion, and he became a true mentor to me."

=== ER ===
Between 1997 and 1999, Mills wrote four episodes of ER. He is credited with creating the character of "Rocket" Romano.

=== The Corner ===
During 1999, David Simon was asked to adapt his book The Corner: A Year in the Life of an Inner-City Neighborhood into a miniseries for HBO. Simon invited Mills to co-write and co-produce the six-part miniseries, also called The Corner. The critically acclaimed program, which ran during 2000, was awarded three Primetime Emmys. Simon and Mills won the award for Writing, they shared the award for Outstanding Mini-Series with two co-producers, and director Charles S. Dutton won the Emmy for Directing.

In another P-Funk reference, Mills named his production company Knee Deep Productions, a reference to Funkadelic's 1979 hit "(Not Just) Knee Deep".

=== Kingpin ===
Mills's next project was the development of an original miniseries for NBC. Kingpin, a six-part series that aired during 2003, was a drama about the head of a Mexican drug cartel and his business and family lives. It was expected to be network television's answer to HBO's hit series The Sopranos, but lackluster ratings forced NBC to cancel plans to extend the miniseries into a full-length series.

=== The Wire ===
In 2006 Mills was reunited with Simon as part of the writing staff for The Wire. He joined the crew of the fourth season as a writer. He wrote the teleplay for "Soft Eyes" from a story he co-wrote with producer Ed Burns. Mills and the writing staff won the Writers Guild of America (WGA) Award for Best Dramatic Series at the February 2008 ceremony and the 2007 Edgar Award for Best Television Feature/Mini-Series Teleplay, both for their work on the fourth season.

He returned as a writer for the fifth season in 2008. Mills wrote the episode "React Quotes". Mills and the writing staff were nominated for the WGA Award for Best Dramatic Series at the February 2009 ceremony for their work on the fifth season but Mad Men won the award.

=== Conviction ===
During 2006 Mills wrote one script for the short-lived Conviction.

=== Treme ===
Mills collaborated with Simon on Treme, a series that premiered on HBO in April 2010. The final episode of the show's first season was dedicated to him.

== Book ==
In 1998, Mills and some of his fellow Uncut Funk authors edited various interviews they had conducted with P-Funk members over the years. The resulting book, George Clinton and P-Funk: An Oral History, was published as part of the For the Record series, edited by music critic Dave Marsh.

== Death ==
David Mills died of a brain aneurysm on March 30, 2010, at the Tulane Medical Center in New Orleans, Louisiana, twelve days before the premiere of Treme. Two weeks after his death, 80 members of the cast and crew of the show dedicated a tree in New Orleans' City Park in Mills's memory. As the Rebirth Brass Band played, the group ate apple-filled Hubig's Pies from wrappers on which the lines "David Mills 1961–2010/Won't Bow, Don't Know How" had been stamped.

== Awards ==
Year	Award	Category	Result	Work	Notes
2009	Writers Guild of America (WGA) Award	Outstanding Dramatic Series	Nominated	The Wire season 5	Shared with Ed Burns, Chris Collins, Dennis Lehane, David Mills, George Pelecanos, Richard Price, David Simon and William F. Zorzi
2008	Writers Guild of America (WGA) Award	Outstanding Dramatic Series	Won	The Wire season 4	Shared with Ed Burns, Chris Collins, Kia Corthron, Dennis Lehane, Eric Overmyer, George Pelecanos, Richard Price, David Simon and William F. Zorzi
2007	Edgar Award	Best Television Feature/Mini-Series Teleplay	Won	The Wire season 4	Shared with Ed Burns, Kia Corthron, Dennis Lehane, Eric Overmyer, George Pelecanos, Richard Price, David Simon and William F. Zorzi
2000	Emmy Award	Outstanding Miniseries	Won	The Corner	Shared with Robert F. Colesberry, Nina K. Noble and David Simon
2000	Emmy Award	Outstanding Writing for a Miniseries or a Movie	Won	The Corner	Shared with David Simon
1999	WGA Award	Episodic Drama	Nominated	Homicide: Life on the Street episode "Finnegan's Wake"	Shared with David Simon and James Yoshimura
1998	Emmy Award	Outstanding Drama Series	Nominated	ER	Shared with Penny Adams, Neal Baer, Christopher Chulack, Michael Crichton, Carol Flint, Lance Gentile, Walon Green, Jack Orman, Tom Park, Wendy Spence, John Wells and Lydia Woodward
1997	Emmy Award	Outstanding Drama Series	Nominated	NYPD Blue	Shared with Steven Bochco, Bill Clark, Steven DePaul, Robert J. Doherty, David Milch, Theresa Rebeck, Michael M. Robin, Mark Tinker and Michael W. Watkins
1997	Emmy Award	Outstanding Writing for a Drama Series	Nominated	NYPD Blue episode "Taillight's Last Gleaming"	
1997	Humanitas Prize	60 minute category	Won	NYPD Blue	
1996	Emmy Award	Outstanding Writing for a Drama Series	Nominated	NYPD Blue episode "The Backboard Jungle"	Shared with William L. Morris
1995	WGA Award	Episodic Drama	Won	Homicide: Life on the Street episode "Bop Gun"	Shared with David Simon
1992	Pulitzer Prize		Nominated	articles for The Washington Post	

== Bibliography ==
- Mills, David; Alexander, Larry; Stanley, Thomas; Thomas, Aris (1998). George Clinton and P-Funk: An Oral History. New York: Avon Books. ISBN 0-380-79378-4.
