= Khandi Alexander =

American dancer, choreographer, and actress (born 1957)

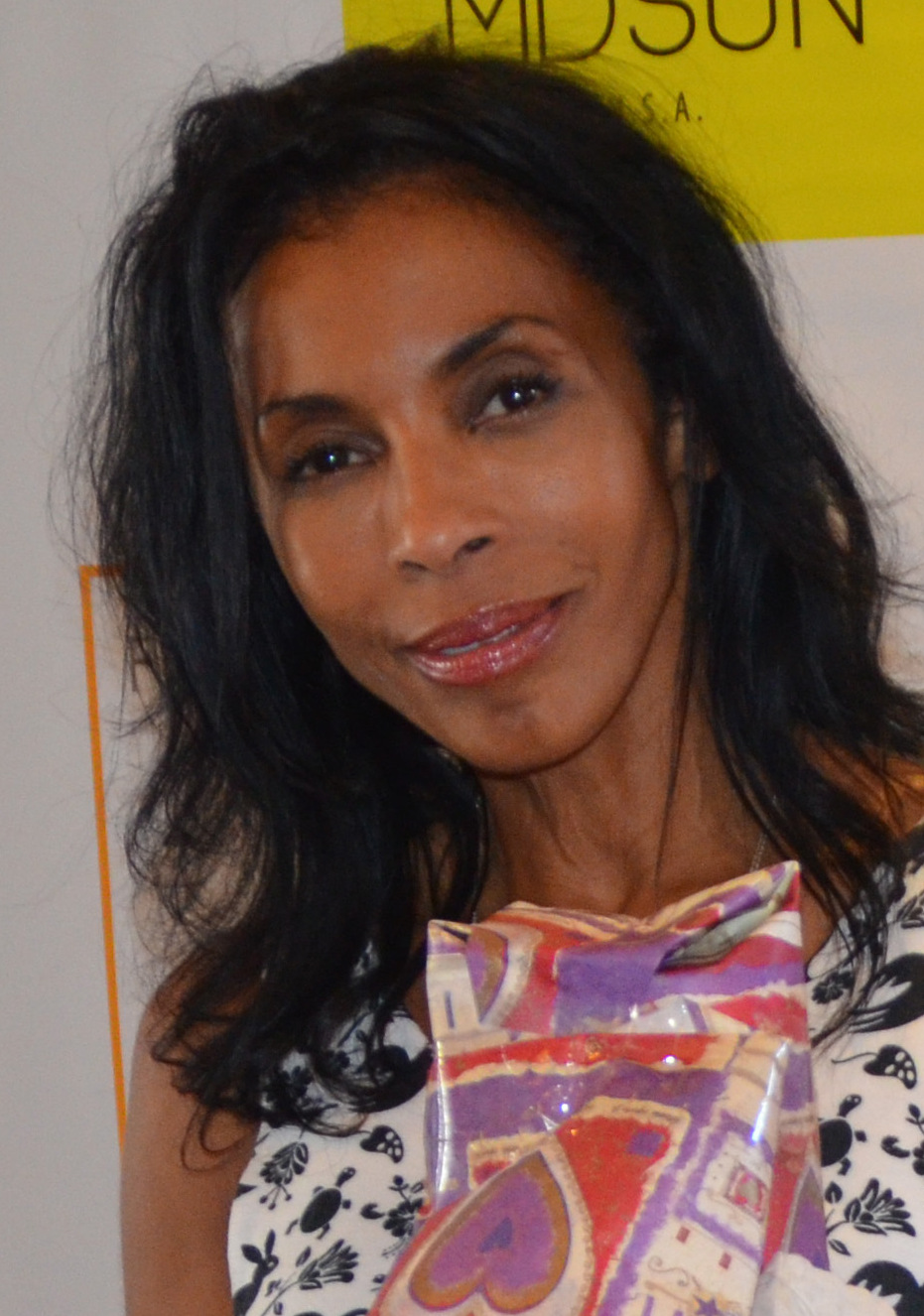
- Alexander in 2014
- Born: Harriet Rene Alexander; September 4, 1957 (age 69); Jacksonville, Florida, U.S.
- Occupations: Dancer; choreographer; actress
- Years active: 1985–present
- Known for: There's Something About Mary; The Corner; CSI: Miami; NewsRadio; Scandal; ER

Harriet Rene "Khandi" Alexander (born September 4, 1957) is an American dancer, choreographer, and actress. She began her career as a dancer in the 1980s, and was a choreographer for Whitney Houston's world tours from 1988 to 1992.

During the 1990s, Alexander appeared in a number of films, including CB4 (1993), What's Love Got to Do with It (1993), Sugar Hill (1994), and There's Something About Mary (1998). She starred as Catherine Duke in the NBC sitcom NewsRadio from 1995 to 1998. She also had a major recurring role in the NBC medical drama ER (1995–2001) as Jackie Robbins, sister to Dr. Peter Benton. Alexander also received critical acclaim for her leading performance in the HBO miniseries The Corner in 2000.

From 2002 to 2009, Alexander starred as Dr. Alexx Woods in the CBS police procedural series CSI: Miami. From 2010 to 2013, she starred as LaDonna Batiste-Williams in the HBO drama Treme. Later in 2013, she joined the cast of the ABC drama Scandal as Maya Lewis, Olivia Pope's mother, for which she received a Primetime Emmy Award nomination in 2015. Alexander also received a Critics' Choice Television Award nomination for playing Bessie Smith's sister Viola in the 2015 HBO film Bessie.

== Early life, family and education ==
Khandi Alexander was born in Jacksonville, Florida, the daughter of Alverina Yavonna (Masters), an opera and jazz singer, and Henry Roland Alexander, who owned a construction company. She was raised in Queens, New York. By the time she was in fifth grade, she knew she wanted to be in show business.

She attended Queensborough Community College before pursuing an acting career. She trained at Alvin Ailey Studio.

== Career ==
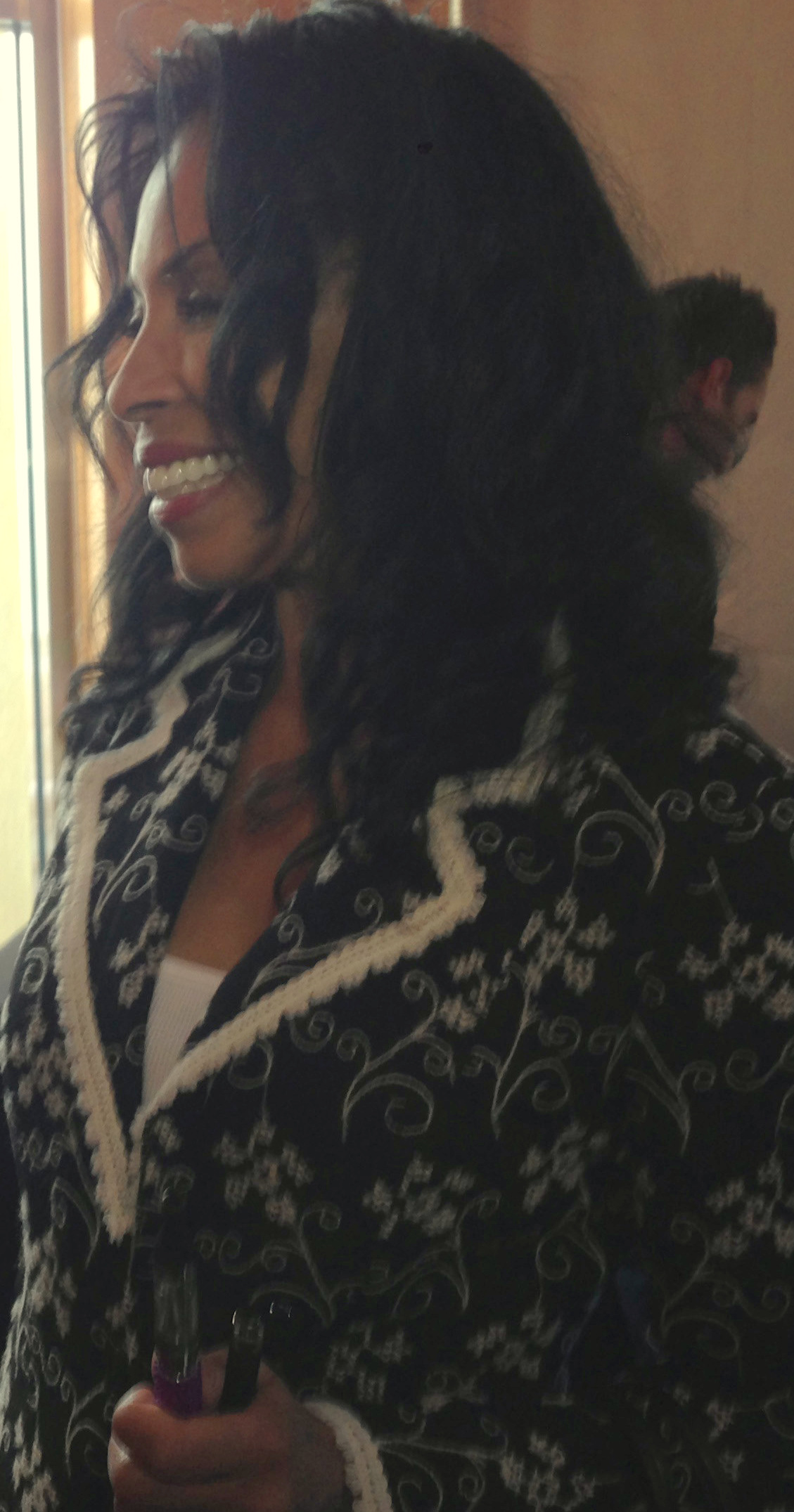
Alexander in 2013

Alexander performed on stage in 1980 and 1981 as Susie in Period of Adjustment. She was a dancer in Natalie Cole's music video for "Pink Cadillac" in 1988. She met pop singer Whitney Houston in 1989, backstage at an American Music Awards ceremony. She became Houston's choreographer, "working with her on her world tour" until 1992. Alexander has appeared on Broadway, starring in Chicago, Bob Fosse's Dancin', and Dreamgirls.

Alexander appears as a dancer in the 1985 film A Chorus Line. She made her television debut on the 1985 sketch-comedy show FTV. Since the early 1990s, Alexander has concentrated on film and TV, playing supporting roles in several movies, including CB4, Joshua Tree, What's Love Got to Do with It, Poetic Justice, and Sugar Hill.

In 1995, Alexander was cast as Catherine Duke on the NBC comedy series NewsRadio. She stayed with the show until season 4, episode 7, "Catherine Moves On", then returned for a final appearance in the season 5 premiere episode, "Bill Moves On" to memorialize Phil Hartman. She played the recurring character of Jackie Robbins in the medical drama series ER. Alexander has made a number of guest appearances on other television shows, including Law & Order: Special Victims Unit, NYPD Blue, Third Watch, Cosby, Better Off Ted, La Femme Nikita, and Body of Proof.

In 2000, Alexander won critical acclaim for her performance as Fran Boyd, a mother addicted to drugs in the Emmy Award-winning HBO miniseries The Corner. She later appeared in the films Emmett's Mark and Dark Blue, and starred opposite Rob Lowe in the Lifetime television movie Perfect Strangers. In 2002 through 2008, she portrayed the character of Alexx Woods, a medical examiner in the CBS police drama CSI: Miami. Alexander left CSI: Miami shortly before the end of the 2007–2008 season. Her final appearance aired on May 5, 2008. On February 2, 2009, she returned to the role of Alexx Woods for a guest appearance in the episode "Smoke Gets in Your CSI's". She returned again as Alexx Woods in guest appearances in the episodes "Out of Time" on September 21, 2009, and "Bad Seed" on October 19, 2009.

In fall 2008, Alexander was cast as a lead character in the HBO drama pilot Treme, that premiered on April 11, 2010. She played a bar owner in a neighborhood of New Orleans affected by Hurricane Katrina. She received critical acclaim for her performance in the show. Alexander starred in the award-winning HBO television series by David Simon from 2010 to 2013. The series ended after four seasons. She later was cast in Shonda Rhimes' drama series Scandal as Maya Lewis, Kerry Washington's character Olivia Pope's mother. In 2015, she was nominated for a Primetime Emmy Award for Outstanding Guest Actress in a Drama Series for her performance.

In 2014, Alexander was cast as older sister of Queen Latifah's title character in the HBO Film Bessie about iconic blues singer Bessie Smith. She was nominated for a Critics' Choice Television Award for Best Supporting Actress in a Movie/Miniseries.

== Personal life ==
Alexander has resided in Queens, New York City, New York; and Los Angeles, California. She has owned cats.

Alexander's drug usage began "in the mid-1980s. By the late-1980s, her drug problem began to interfere with her dancing and choreographing. Eventually Alexander had a breakdown and realized that she needed help," and she checked herself in to drug rehabilitation facility for 30 days in 1990 with support from her friend and employer Whitney Houston.

== Filmography ==
=== Film ===
Year	Film	Role	Notes
1985	Streetwalkin'	Star	
1985	A Chorus Line	Dancer	
1987	Maid to Order	Hooker in Jail	
1993	CB4	Sissy	
1993	Joshua Tree	Maralena Turner	
1993	Menace II Society	Karen Lawson	
1993	What's Love Got to Do with It	Darlene	
1993	Poetic Justice	Simone	
1994	Sugar Hill	Ella Skuggs	
1994	House Party 3	Janelle	
1994	Greedy	Laura Densmore, P.I.	
1996	No Easy Way	Diana Campbell	
1998	There's Something About Mary	Joanie	
1999	Thick as Thieves	Janet	
2002	Fool Proof	Icarus	
2002	Emmett's Mark	Detective Middlestat	
2002	Dark Blue	Janelle Holland	
2006	Rain	Latishia Arnold	
2007	First Born	Dierdre	
2013	The-N-word	Ms. Greene	Short
2016	A Woman, a Part	Leslie	
2016	Pushing Dead	Dot	
2016	Patriots Day	Veronica the Interrogator	
2018	Fahrenheit 451	Toni Morrison	

=== Television ===
Year	Title	Role	Notes
1985	FTV	Various Characters	TV series
1987	Rags to Riches	The Delights	Episode: "Pilot"
1988	Duet	Nurse	Episode: "Special Delivery"
1989	A Different World	Theressa Stone	Episode: "Citizen Wayne"
1992	The Edge	Various Characters	Episode: "Episode #1.11"
1993	Shameful Secrets	Rosalie	TV movie
1994	To My Daughter with Love	Harriet	TV movie
1995–1998	NewsRadio	Catherine Duke	Main cast (season 1–4), guest (season 5)
1995–2001	ER	Jackie Robbins	Recurring cast (season 1–8)
1996	Terminal	Dr. Deborah Levy	TV movie
1998	La Femme Nikita	Terry	Episode: "Soul Sacrifice"
1999	Cosby	Karen	Episode: "The Awful Truth"
1999	NYPD Blue	Sonya	Episode: "What's Up, Chuck?"
1999	Spawn 3: Ultimate Battle	Lakesha / Nurse (voice)	Episode: "Seed of the Hellspawn"
1999	X-Chromosome	Yolanda (voice)	TV series
1999	Partners	Charlie	TV movie
2000	Rude Awakening	Juanita Wilson	Episode: "Star 80 Proof"
2000	The Corner	Denise Francine 'Fran' Boyd	Main cast
2000	Third Watch	Beverly Saunders	Episode: "History"
2001	Law & Order: Special Victims Unit	Sgt. Karen Smythe	Episode: "Paranoia"
2002	CSI: Crime Scene Investigation	Dr. Alexx Woods	Episode: "Cross Jurisdictions"
2002–2009	CSI: Miami	Dr. Alexx Woods	Main cast (season 1–6), guest (season 7–8)
2003	Life's a Bitch	Yolanda	Episode: "Pilot"
2004	Perfect Strangers	Christie Kaplan	TV movie
2009	Better Off Ted	Stella Clifton	Episode: "Battle of the Bulbs"
2010–2013	Treme	LaDonna Batiste-Williams	Main cast
2012	Body of Proof	Beverly Travers	Episode: "Occupational Hazards" & "Identity"
2013–2018	Scandal	Maya Pope	Recurring cast (season 3–4 & 6–7)
2014	The Assault	Detective Jodi Miller	TV movie
2015	Bessie	Viola Smith	TV movie
2015	BoJack Horseman	Police Chief / Farmer's Wife (voice)	Episode: "Chickens"
2019	A Black Lady Sketch Show	Narrator	Episode: "Why Are Her Pies Wet, Lord?"
2019	SEAL Team	Ambassador Nicole Marsden	Episode: "All Along the Watchtower: Part 1 & 2"
2021	What We Do in the Shadows	Contessa Carmilla De Mornay	Episode: "A Farewell"
2026	Abbott Elementary	Miss Carroll	Episode: "Mall Part 3: Heroes"; Episode: "The Campaign"

=== Music videos ===
Year	Title	Artist
1993	"Heaven Knows"	Luther Vandross

== Awards and nominations ==
Year	Award	Category	Work	Result
1998	NAACP Image Award	Outstanding Supporting Actress in a Comedy Series	NewsRadio	Nominated
2000	Online Film & Television Association	Best Actress in a Motion Picture or Miniseries	The Corner	Nominated
2001	NAACP Image Award	Outstanding Actress in a Television Movie, Mini-Series or Dramatic Special	The Corner	Nominated
2001	Black Reel Awards	Best Actress	The Corner	Won
2002	NAACP Image Award	Outstanding Supporting Actress in a Drama Series	Law & Order: Special Victims Unit	Nominated
2003	DVD Exclusive Awards	Best Actress	Emmett's Mark	Nominated
2005	NAACP Image Award	Outstanding Supporting Actress in a Drama Series	CSI: Miami	Won
2006	NAACP Image Award	Outstanding Actress in a Drama Series	CSI: Miami	Nominated
2011	Vision Award	Best Performance - Drama	Treme	Won
2012	NAACP Image Award	Outstanding Actress in a Drama Series	Treme	Nominated
2013	NAACP Image Award	Outstanding Actress in a Drama Series	Treme	Nominated
2014	NAACP Image Award	Outstanding Actress in a Drama Series	Treme	Nominated
2014	Vision Award	Best Performance - Drama	Treme	Nominated
2015	NAACP Image Award	Outstanding Supporting Actress in a Drama Series	Scandal	Won
2015	Critics' Choice Television Award	Best Supporting Actress in a Movie or Miniseries	Bessie	Nominated
2015	Primetime Emmy Award	Outstanding Guest Actress in a Drama Series	Scandal	Nominated
