= Donnie Andrews =

Former criminal, turned anti-crime advocate (1954–2012)

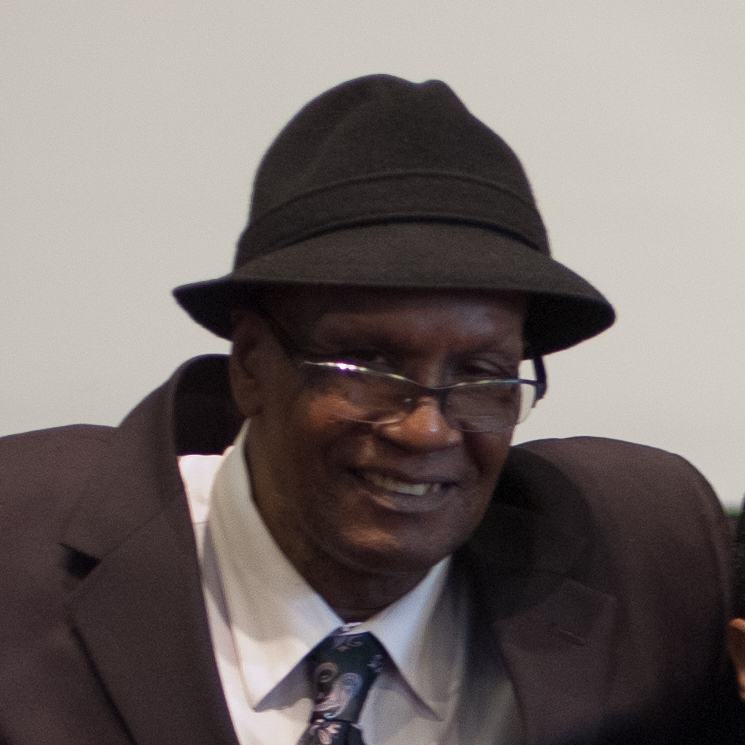
- Andrews in 2010
- Born: Larry Donnell Andrews; April 29, 1954; Baltimore, Maryland, U.S.
- Died: December 13, 2012 (aged 58); Manhattan, New York, U.S.
- Occupations: Criminal, anti-crime advocate
- Spouse: Fran Boyd (m. 2007)

Larry Donnell "Donnie" Andrews (April 29, 1954 – December 13, 2012) was an American armed robber, murderer, and anti-crime advocate. He was one of the inspirations for the character Omar Little on the HBO series The Wire.

== Early life ==
Andrews grew up in a housing project in West Baltimore, Maryland. He was physically abused by his mother and became addicted to heroin, easily obtainable in the crime-ridden environment of his childhood, at a young age. As a 9-year-old boy, he witnessed a man being beaten to death over 15 cents.

== Life of crime and after ==
Andrews became an armed robber who robbed drug dealers, but who also adhered to a code of ethics that included never harming either women or children. He was known to police for an extensive record of armed robbery, assault, and trafficking in stolen narcotics throughout the 1970s and early 1980s in Baltimore. In 1986, local drug kingpin Warren Boardley hired Andrews (who by this point was stealing largely to support his heroin addiction) to back up Reggie Gross, an enforcer tasked with the contract killing of two associates, Zachary Roach and Rodney "Touche" Young. Filled with guilt, Andrews surrendered himself to Ed Burns, a homicide detective with the Baltimore Police Department. Working with Burns, he agreed to wear a covert listening device, which he used to implicate Boardley and Gross in the killings.

In 1987, Andrews received a life sentence for the murders of Roach and Young. He was denied parole on his first few attempts, but continued to study, ended his addiction to heroin, and helped other inmates by running an anti-gang workshop.

Andrews was paroled from prison in 2005. He performed youth outreach after his release. His foundation, Why Murder?, attempted to steer children away from a life of crime.

== The Wire ==
By 1998, Burns and David Simon, as well as the lead prosecutor who obtained Andrews' conviction, began to lobby for Andrews' release from prison. While Andrews was in prison, Simon sent him copies of the newspaper, and Andrews in turn gave Simon a wealth of information about crimes taking place in Baltimore. Simon named Andrews a consultant on The Wire, a critically acclaimed HBO series about crime in Baltimore which ran from 2002 to 2008. Simon used Andrews as one of the inspirations for the character Omar Little, a stickup artist who never targeted innocent bystanders.

He portrayed Donnie on The Wire, an associate of Omar and his advisor Butchie.

== Personal life ==
While Andrews was in prison, Ed Burns introduced him to Fran Boyd, whose family was prominently featured in The Corner: A Year in the Life of an Inner-City Neighborhood, a 1997 book by Burns and David Simon. Andrews and Boyd's first conversation came in January 1993, when Boyd was still using drugs; Andrews used his own experiences to encourage Boyd to get clean.

Andrews and Boyd married on August 11, 2007. Wedding guests included Simon and The Wire cast members Dominic West, Sonja Sohn, and Andre Royo.

Andrews suffered from an aortic dissection, from which he died on December 13, 2012, in Manhattan, New York. He was 58 years old.
