= Film Hawk =

US documentary film

Film Hawk is a 2017 US documentary film by JJ Garvine and Tai Parquet that charts the life and career of veteran film producer and consultant Robert Hawk. It contains interviews with a number of US independent filmmakers whose work has been nurtured by Hawk such as Rob Epstein, Kevin Smith, Ed Burns, David Rosfeld, Ira Sachs and Barbra Hammer. The film premiered at the 2016 Sundance Film Festival.
