= Jim True-Frost =

American actor (born 1966)

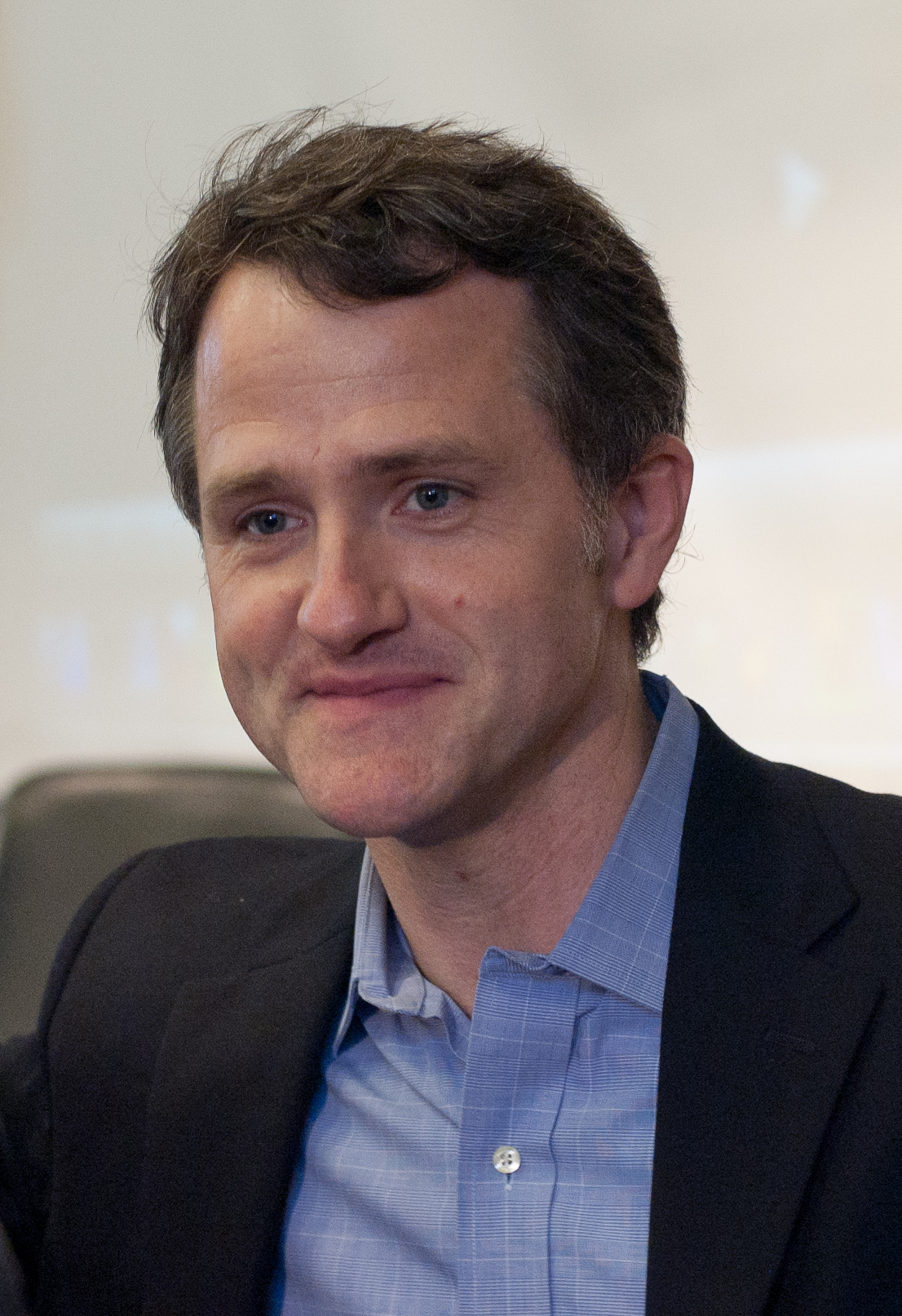
- True-Frost at Harvard University in 2011
- Born: Jim True; July 31, 1966 (age 59); Greenwich, Connecticut, U.S.
- Occupation: Actor
- Years active: 1986–present
- Spouse: Cora Frost (m. 1999)
- Children: 2

Jim True-Frost (né True; July 31, 1966) is an American stage, television and screen actor. He is most known for his portrayal of Roland "Prez" Pryzbylewski on all five seasons of the HBO drama series The Wire (2002–2008), as James Woodrow in Treme (2010–2013), and film roles such as Singles (1992).

== Biography ==
True-Frost graduated from New Trier High School in Winnetka, Illinois. He has been an ensemble member of the Steppenwolf Theatre Company in Chicago since 1989. Prior to that, he was a member of Remains Theater, co-founded by actor William L. Petersen (To Live and Die in L.A., CSI: Crime Scene Investigation). True-Frost appeared in the film Off the Map with fellow Steppenwolf ensemble member Joan Allen, directed by Singles co-star Campbell Scott. He has performed on Broadway and as far away as Sierra Leone.

When he married lawyer and legal scholar Cora Frost in 1999, both changed their last names to True-Frost. Jim and his wife now reside in Syracuse, New York, and have two children, a son named Leo and a daughter named Phoebe.

True-Frost appeared in 2008 as Brutus in the American Repertory Theatre's production of William Shakespeare's Julius Caesar, as well as Steppenwolf's Broadway run of August: Osage County, which won the Tony for Best Play.

== Filmography ==
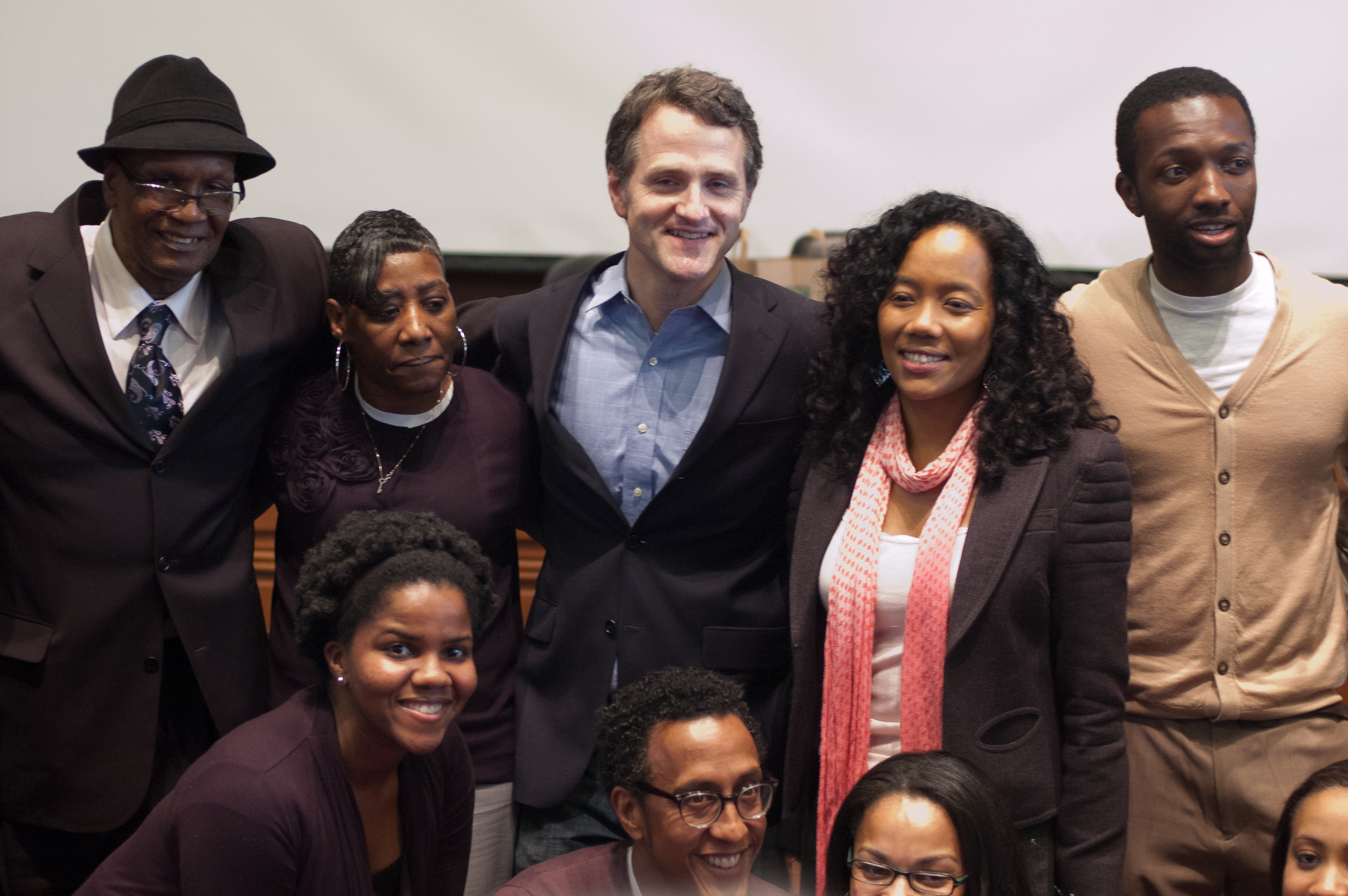
True-Frost (center) with (from left to right) Donnie Andrews, Fran Boyd, Sonja Sohn, and Jamie Hector, (Andre Royo is in the bottom row)

=== Films ===
Year	Title	Role	Notes
1989	Fat Man and Little Boy	Donald Hornig	
1992	Singles	David Bailey	
1994	Two Over Easy	Jesse	
1994	The Hudsucker Proxy	Clarence "Buzz" Gunderson	
1994	Normal Life	Mike Anderson	
1996	Far Harbor	Ryland	
1996	Joe		Short film; special thanks
1997	Affliction	Jack Hewitt	
2003	Off the Map	William Gibbs	
2005	Winter Passing	Doctor	
2006	Slippery Slope	Hugh Winston	
2008	Diminished Capacity	Donny Prine	
2008	Sympathetic Details	Rogers	
2009	Company Retreat	Perry McHugh	
2010	The Conspirator	General Hartranft	
2019	Saint Frances	Isaac	

=== Television ===
Year	Title	Role	Notes
1986	Crime Story	Jo Jo Sweeney	Episode: "Pilot"
1995	W.E.I.R.D. World	Noah Lane, Robotics	TV movie
1996	Early Edition	Sam	Episode: "The Wrong Man" (#1.10)
1996	Homicide: Life on the Street	George Buxton	Episode: "Stakeout" (#4.15)
2002, 2010	Law & Order: Criminal Intent	Various characters	2 episodes
2002–2008	The Wire	Roland 'Prez' Pryzbylewski	Series regular
2002	Benjamin Franklin	William Franklin	Mini-series
2003	Karen Sisco	Lestor Porter	Episode: "Nostalgia"
2004	Anatomy of a Scene	Himself	Episode: "Off the Map"
2005, 2008	Law & Order	Various characters	2 episodes
2007	CSI: Miami	Dave Keppling	Episode: "Stand Your Ground"
2007	Medium	Stephen Campbell	Episode: "The Boy Next Door"
2009	Law & Order: Special Victims Unit	Thomas Banks	Episode: "Hardwired"
2010	Chase	Curt Seaver	Episode: "The Longest Night"
2010	Fringe	Ted Pratchett	Episode: "Jacksonville"
2010–2013	Treme	James Woodrow	Recurring role
2011	Blue Bloods	Lyle Greene	Episode: "To Tell the Truth"
2012	666 Park Avenue	Peter Kramer	3 episodes
2012	The Good Wife	Seth Kleinberg	Episode: "The Penalty Box"
2013	Elementary	Anson Samuels	Episode: "Déjà Vu All Over Again"
2013–2014	Hostages	Secret Service Agent Logan	Season regular
2014	Boardwalk Empire	Eliot Ness	Episode: "The Good Listener"
2015	American Odyssey	Ron Ballard	Series regular
2017	Law & Order: Special Victims Unit	Lawrence Hendricks Jr.	Episode: "Decline and Fall"
2017	Z: The Beginning of Everything	Max Perkins	5 episodes
2018	Blindspot	John Saya	Episode: "Balance of Might"
2018–2022	Manifest	Rector Dave Hynes	3 episodes
2019	Madam Secretary	Pastor Eli Bragg	Episode: "The New Normal"
2019	Proven Innocent	Professor Arthur Kauffman	Episode: "A CinderHella Story"
2020	The Blacklist	Gordon Kemp	Episode: "Gordon Kemp (No. 158)"
2021	American Rust	Pete Novick	5 episodes
2022	Yellowstone	Father McGreggor	Episode "Grass on the Streets and Weeds on the Rooftops"
2022	Law & Order: Special Victims Unit	Mitch Caplan	Episode "Video Killed the Radio Star"
