= Black Market with Michael K. Williams =

Black Market with Michael K. Williams is a television series that airs on VICELAND, and is hosted by Michael K. Williams. The series features Williams journeying into the dangerous world of illicit trade. In the first season, Williams hangs out with thieves, poachers, drug users, gun runners, and possible killers to learn why crime pays for them.

In the second season, Williams invites guest hosts from all over the world to explore global black markets, including poaching, smuggling, and underground fights.
