= Fran Boyd =

American drug counsellor and actress (1956–2022)

Denise Francine Boyd Andrews
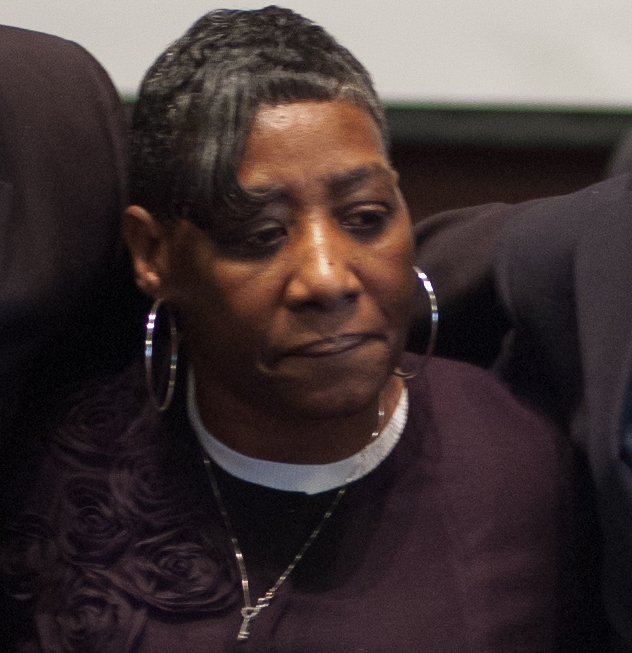
- Boyd in 2010
- Born: Denise Francine Boyd; October 15, 1956; Baltimore, Maryland, USA
- Died: May 3, 2022 (aged 65); Parkville, Maryland, USA
- Spouse: Donnie Andrews
- Children: 2

Denise Francine Boyd Andrews (October 15, 1956 – May 3, 2022) was an American drug counsellor and actress.

== Early life ==
Boyd was born on October 15, 1956, in Baltimore, Maryland.

== Career ==
Her struggle with drug addiction was chronicled in The Corner: A Year in the Life of an Inner-City Neighborhood, a book by David Simon and Ed Burns, which was adapted into an HBO miniseries.

Boyd was an actress, known for The Wire (2002) and The Corner (2000).

== Personal life ==
She married Donnie Andrews in 2007. Her son, DeAndre McCullough, who also served as an inspiration for The Corner, died at the age of 35 in 2012. Boyd died on May 3, 2022, at her home in Parkville, Maryland.
