= Tawny Platis =

American voice actress (born 1990)

Tawny Platis (December 12, 1990) is an American voice actress. She has worked as an actress for commercials, automated voice projects, audiobooks, and video games. She is best known for her viral social media videos where she demonstrates different voice styles and tones within an informational context.

== Life and career ==
Platis was born and raised in San Diego. Her first advertising job was when she was an infant. She continued to work in commercials while growing up, and was working full-time by her twenties. She has voiced characters for audiobooks and for voice-to-speech. Her voice is frequently licensed for automated voice projects, such as to software companies.

She gained wider prominence for social media videos discussing her past work and breaking down voice trends for various media tropes. One of her viral videos shared information on the voice of the "cool girl" in media throughout history, with Platis voice acting examples corresponding to each decade.

She is an actress for several characters in the upcoming video game sequel to Symphony of War: The Nephilim Saga.

Platis resides in San Diego.
