= The Corner =

American television series

- The Corner DVD cover
- Genre: Drama
- Based on: The Corner: A Year in the Life of an Inner-City Neighborhood by David Simon; Ed Burns
- Written by: David Simon; David Mills
- Directed by: Charles S. Dutton
- Starring: T. K. Carter; Khandi Alexander; Sean Nelson
- Theme music composer: Corey Harris
- Country of origin: United States
- Original language: English
- No. of episodes: 6

Production
- Producers: Robert F. Colesberry; David Mills; David Simon; Nina Kostroff Noble
- Production location: Baltimore, Maryland
- Cinematography: Ivan Strasburg
- Running time: 59–73 minutes
- Production companies: Blown Deadline Productions; HBO Films; Knee Deep Productions

Original release
- Network: HBO
- Release: April 16 – May 21, 2000

The Corner is a 2000 HBO drama television miniseries based on the nonfiction book The Corner: A Year in the Life of an Inner-City Neighborhood (1997) by David Simon and Ed Burns, and adapted for television by David Simon and David Mills. It premiered on HBO in the United States on April 16, 2000, and concluded its six-part run on May 21, 2000. The series was released on DVD on July 22, 2003. It won the Primetime Emmy Award for Outstanding Miniseries in 2000.

The Corner chronicles the life of a family living in poverty amid the open-air drug markets of West Baltimore. "The corner" is the junction of West Fayette Street and North Monroe Street (U.S. Route 1).

== Cast and characters ==
- T. K. Carter as Gary McCullough, a drug addict; DeAndre's father, and Fran's ex-husband. He dropped out of college when Fran became pregnant and became addicted to drugs after their marriage ended.
- Khandi Alexander as Denise Francine "Fran" Boyd, a drug addict; DeAndre McCullough and DeRodd Hearns' mother, and Gary's ex-wife. She lives in the "Dew Drop Inn" with her sisters, Bunchie and Sharry, brother Stevie, and his son.
- Sean Nelson as DeAndre "Black" McCullough, a 15-year-old drug dealer; Gary McCullough and Francine "Fran" Boyd's son.
- Clarke Peters as Fat Curt
- Glenn Plummer as George "Blue" Epps
- Toy Connor as Tyreeka Freamon
- Maria Broom as Bunchie Boyd
- Sylvester Lee Kirk as DeRodd, DeAndre's younger brother
- Corey Parker Robinson as R.C.
- Reg E. Cathey as Scalio
- Rodney Scott as Little DeAndre

Many actors from The Corner had also appeared in Homicide: Life on the Street (1993–1999), which was adapted from Simon's book, Homicide: A Year on the Killing Streets (1991). Similarly, many actors who appeared in The Corner later appeared in Simon's next television series, The Wire (2002–2008), often playing contrasting characters, e.g., Clarke Peters, Maria Broom, Corey Parker Robinson, Reg E. Cathey, Clayton LeBouef, Donnell Rawlings, Tootsie Duvall, Robert F. Chew, Lance Reddick, Delaney Williams, and DeAndre McCullough (as an assistant to Brother Mouzone). Additionally, Alexander and Peters later starred in Simon's television series Treme (2010–2013), and DeAndre McCullough (who also played a bit role in The Corner, as a policeman who arrested 15-year-old DeAndre) briefly worked for the show in set construction and on the security crew.

== Episodes ==
Each episode starts and ends with a documentary style interview, wherein a lead character answers questions posed by the director, Charles S. Dutton.

No.	Title	Directed by	Written by	Original release date
1	"Gary's Blues"	Charles S. Dutton	David Simon & David Mills	April 16, 2000
Thirty-four year-old Gary McCullough has seen four years of drug addiction strip him of his money, his career, and his family. Now he has one mission: to get his next drug fix. When he's not shooting up with his girlfriend Ronnie - a ruthless, scheming addict who even steals from Gary when he isn't looking - he scours the neighborhood for heroin or spare cigarettes, and scrounges for money selling scrap metal and stolen appliances.
2	"DeAndre's Blues"	Charles S. Dutton	David Simon & David Mills	April 23, 2000
DeAndre spends his life walking a fine line between childhood and maturity - a very fine line, since both of his parents are addicts, and he's been dealing drugs since he was 13 years old. DeAndre hangs out with his girlfriend Tyreeka while struggling to attend school so he can achieve a promotion from 9th to 10th grade. After getting into a fight with his mother, Fran, he leaves to stay with his father, Gary, who ends up stealing some of his drugs.
3	"Fran's Blues"	Charles S. Dutton	David Mills	April 30, 2000
Fran has her own drug habit but 15-year-old DeAndre helps support her and his younger half brother De'Rodd by selling cocaine on the corner. Fran's admonitions to her son against selling drugs continue to go unheeded, and DeAndre gets busted again. This time, to teach him a lesson, Fran makes no effort to get him out, and he is transferred to "Boy's Village", where he gets a wake-up call. The real Fran Boyd makes a cameo appearance in this episode, as a receptionist.
4	"Dope Fiend Blues"	Charles S. Dutton	David Simon	May 7, 2000
Attempting to go straight, Gary gets a seasonal job at the crab market where he worked in his youth. When an addict gets shot, a local artist named Blue realizes the time to clean up his life is now or never. DeAndre has a new girlfriend, not knowing that Tyreeka, whom he's been ignoring, is pregnant with his child. With his mother in rehab, DeAndre turns to Gary for some money to feed the family. The real DeAndre McCullough makes a cameo appearance in this episode, as the police officer arresting Blue; the real Tyreeka Freamon makes a cameo appearance in this episode, as a Checkers employee; and the real George "Blue" Epps makes a cameo appearance in this episode, as a counselor.
5	"Corner Boy Blues"	Charles S. Dutton	David Simon & David Mills	May 14, 2000
Things are going well for Fran, who proudly moves the family into a new home, but not so well for Gary, who loses his job as the crab season ends. With a baby on the way, DeAndre attempts to walk a straight line, taking a job at a fast food restaurant while still earning off the corner and agreeing to a midnight curfew imposed by Fran. Drugs are starting to take their toll on the aging corner seller, Curt, who collapses and ends up in the hospital.
6	"Everyman's Blues"	Charles S. Dutton	David Simon & David Mills	May 21, 2000
The entire Boyd family gathers for Thanksgiving, a celebration that also marks the birth of DeAndre's son. It is a happy time for all, but it is to be short-lived as old addictions are revisited and new ones are born. DeAndre himself falls into a life of drug use.

== Reception ==
=== Critical response ===
The review aggregator website Rotten Tomatoes reported a 100% approval rating with an average rating of 10/10, based on 14 critic reviews. The website's critics consensus reads, "Powerfully performed and authentically written, The Corner is an unwavering depiction of life under the thumb of addiction and poverty." Metacritic, which uses a weighted average, assigned a score of 90 out of 100 based on 21 critics, indicating "universal acclaim".

A review by Hugh K. David of DVD Times praised The Corner as "raw, gritty, uncompromising, realistic, smartly directed, supremely well-acted, compulsively watchable, but harrowing and with little light at the end of the tunnel", comparing it to the television equivalent of such films as Last Exit to Brooklyn (1989) and Requiem for a Dream (2000; also adapted from novels), with elements in common with both La Haine (1995) and City of God (2002).

=== Awards ===
The miniseries received four Emmy awards nominations at the 52nd Primetime Emmy Awards. It won for Outstanding Miniseries; Outstanding Directing for a Miniseries, Movie or a Special (Charles S. Dutton); and Outstanding Writing for a Miniseries or a Movie (David Simon and David Mills); and was nominated for Outstanding Casting for a Miniseries, Movie or a Special. It also won a Peabody Award in 2000.

== Related media ==
- Simon, Scott; Simon, David (October 6, 2011). "A Return to The Corner". Need to Know. PBS. "Fifteen years after David Simon and Ed Burns spent a year chronicling an inner city neighborhood in Baltimore in the book and HBO miniseries "The Corner," Need to Know returns to see how life has changed for one of the main characters they profiled."
- Simon, Scott; Simon, David (March 15, 2012). "The Corner, Revisited". Need to Know. PBS. "Scott Simon returns to the inner city community in Baltimore that he first visited last fall to see if recent improvements in the economy are improving the lot of chronically under-employed and unemployed young African-American men there."
