= The Corner: A Year in the Life of an Inner-City Neighborhood =

1997 book by David Simon and Ed Burns

- First edition cover, featuring DeAndre McCullough
- Author: David Simon and Ed Burns
- Language: English
- Genre: True crime
- Publisher: Broadway
- Publication date: September 2, 1997
- Publication place: United States
- Media type: Print (Hardback & Paperback)
- Pages: 560 pp
- ISBN: 0-7679-0030-8 (Hardcover first edition)
- OCLC: 36857674
- Dewey Decimal: 364.1/77/097526 21
- LC Class: HV5833.B2 S55 1997

The Corner: A Year in the Life of an Inner-City Neighborhood is a 1997 book written by Baltimore Sun reporter David Simon and former Baltimore homicide detective Ed Burns. This book follows the lives of individuals who lived on the corner of Fayette Street and Monroe Street in West Baltimore over one year. It was named a Notable Book of the Year by The New York Times.

== Origins ==
Simon credits his editor John Sterling with the suggestion that he observe a single corner in Baltimore. Simon believes Sterling was expecting a neighborhood story but he knew that "the corner" also had connotations for Baltimore's open-air drug markets. He took a second leave of absence from the Baltimore Sun in 1993 to research the project. The authors eventually spent three years working with the people of the neighborhood.

== Plot introduction ==
The book covers a year in the life of an inner city drug market at Fayette & Monroe Streets in Baltimore. Simon and Burns spent over a year interviewing and following around the people who lived on the Fayette & Monroe corner. Although written like a novel, the book is nonfiction; it uses the real names of those people and recounts actual events.

It revolves mostly around the lives of Gary McCullough, a drug addict, his ex-wife Francine "Fran" Boyd, also an addict, and their older son DeAndre McCullough, a high school student who begins to sell drugs. The book is a look at the effects of drug addiction, the drug trade, and the war on drugs on an urban neighborhood, as well as an examination of the sociological factors which underlie the modern drug trade.

== Subjects ==
- Gary McCullough: a drug addict; DeAndre's father and Fran's ex-husband. He dropped out of college when Fran became pregnant and became addicted to drugs after their marriage ended. Burns and Simon wrote that after he died of an overdose after nearly getting clean, "we didn't write a word for months".
- Denise Francine "Fran" Boyd: a drug addicted mother of DeAndre and DeRodd, who lives in the "Dew Drop Inn" with her sisters, Bunchie and Sherry, brother Stevie, and his son.
- DeAndre McCullough: a 15-year-old high school student and some-time drug dealer; Gary McCullough and Francine "Fran" Boyd's son. Thanks in part to Simon's attention, DeAndre went clean for a number of years and even had a minor role in The Corner and The Wire, and briefly worked for Treme in set construction and on the security crew. However, on August 1, 2012, he was found dead at the age of 35, from an apparent drug overdose.
- Rita Hale: "The doctor" at a shooting gallery (a townhouse where people come to get high). She injects patrons "whose veins have retreated to portions of their bodies that can only be reached by a second party", in exchange for drugs.
- Tyreeka Freamon: DeAndre's on-again/off-again girlfriend.
- George "Blue" Epps: runs a shooting gallery from his house where people come to shoot drugs. He has been on the corner for a long time and is regarded as the corner's local artist.
- Ella Thompson: runs the Martin Luther King Jr. Recreation Center for the corner's children, shielding them as best she can from what lies outside the playground's chain-link fence.
- Bob Brown: a Western District police officer who is feared by congregants of the corner due to his harsh treatment of drug dealers, while he remains feared by those involved in drugs, he is shown to also treat the law abiding and elderly citizens respectfully, many of whom act as his informants letting him secretly use their residences to spy on drug dealers.
- Veronica "Ronnie" Boice: Gary McCullough's on-again/off-again girlfriend.
- Rose Davis, aka Miss Rose: works at Francis M. Woods School and is known for letting students back into school after lengthy truancies.
- Curtis "Fat Curt" Davis, an ailing junkie with a 25-year-old habit, who frequents Blue's shooting gallery and supports his habit as a tout for street dealers.

== Impact ==
=== Critical response ===
Richard Price, author of Clockers and later a co-writer of The Wire with the two authors, said that "The Corner is an intimate, intense dispatch from the broken heart of urban America. It is impossible to read these pages and not feel stunned at the high price, in human potential, in thwarted aspirations, that simple survival on the streets of West Baltimore demands of its citizens. An important document, as devastating as it is lucid." The Seattle Times said that in terms of providing the reader access to the secret world of the urban drug trade the book "transcends There Are No Children Here and Clockers."

Simon has said that he feels the book perplexed readers in terms of its outspokenness on political issues, and that liberals were outraged by criticism of welfare, and conservatives were appalled at the ennobling of drug dealers and addicts. In the afterword of Homicide, Simon acknowledged that while most of the detectives he accompanied accepted The Corner as legitimate, some saw it as a "betrayal", possibly due to the mention of the extent of police brutality.

However, it is noted in The Corner that this form of brutality was far worse than had taken place during Simon's tenure as a "police intern" (i.e., reporter). One such example is when a uniformed officer beats a boy who is in handcuffs, whereas in Homicide the code of honor at the time makes clear that "you don't hit a man who's wearing cuffs or is unable to fight back."

=== Adaptations ===
The book was adapted into the 2000 Emmy award winning HBO miniseries, The Corner, for which Simon served as a writer and executive producer. The Millions' Nick Moran observes: "The Wire later adopted aspects from both the book and the miniseries".

== See also ==
- Homicide: A Year on the Killing Streets, also by David Simon
- Tally's Corner: A Study of Negro Streetcorner Men, by Elliot Liebow
