= David Simon =

American author, journalist, and television writer and producer (born 1960)

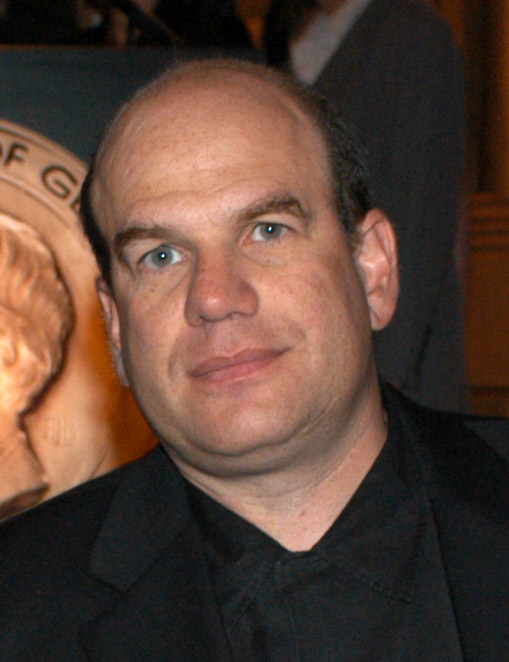
- Simon in 2004
- Born: David Judah Simon; May 13, 1960 (age 66); Washington, D.C., U.S.
- Education: Bethesda-Chevy Chase High School
- Alma mater: University of Maryland, College Park (BA)
- Occupations: Author; journalist; screenwriter; producer
- Spouses: Kayle Tucker (m. 1991; div. 1998) Laura Lippman (m. 2006; div. 2024)
- Children: 2
- Writing career
- Years active: 1982–present
- Subjects: Crime fiction, true crime
- Notable works: The Wire; Treme; The Deuce

David Judah Simon (born May 13, 1960) is an American author, journalist, screenwriter, and producer best known for his work on The Wire (2002–2008).

He worked for The Baltimore Sun City Desk for twelve years (1982–1995), wrote Homicide: A Year on the Killing Streets (1991), and co-wrote The Corner: A Year in the Life of an Inner-City Neighborhood (1997) with Ed Burns. The former book was the basis for the NBC series Homicide: Life on the Street (1993–1999), on which Simon served as a writer and producer. Simon adapted the latter book into the HBO mini-series The Corner (2000).

He is the creator, executive producer, head writer, and showrunner of the HBO television series The Wire (2002–2008). He adapted the non-fiction book Generation Kill into a television mini-series and served as the showrunner for the project. He was selected as one of the 2010 MacArthur Fellows and named an Utne Reader visionary in 2011. Simon also created the HBO series Treme with Eric Overmyer, which aired for four seasons. Following Treme, Simon adapted former New York Times reporter Lisa Belkin's nonfiction Show Me A Hero (1999), into an HBO mini-series, with journalist William F. Zorzi, a colleague at The Baltimore Sun and on The Wire. Simon and frequent collaborator George Pelecanos reunited to create original series The Deuce. The drama about the New York porn industry in the 1970s and 1980s starred producer Maggie Gyllenhaal and executive producer James Franco and aired from 2017 to 2019. Simon's next series, The Plot Against America, debuted in 2020.

We Own This City was developed and written by George Pelecanos and Simon and directed by Reinaldo Marcus Green. The six-episode limited series premiered on HBO on April 25, 2022.

== Early life and education ==
Simon was born in Washington, D.C., the son of Dorothy Simon (née Ligeti), a homemaker, and Bernard Simon, a former journalist and then public relations director for B'nai B'rith for 20 years. Simon was raised in a Jewish family, and had a bar mitzvah ceremony. His family roots are in Russia, Belarus, Hungary, and Slovakia (his maternal grandfather had changed his surname from "Leibowitz" to "Ligeti"). He has a brother, Gary Simon, and a sister, Linda Evans, who died in 1990.

In March 1977, when Simon was still in high school, Simon's father was one of a group of over 140 people held hostage (and later released) in Washington, D.C., by former national secretary of the Nation of Islam Hamaas Abdul Khaalis in the Hanafi Siege.

Simon graduated from Bethesda-Chevy Chase High School in Bethesda, Maryland, and wrote for the school newspaper, The Tattler. In 1983, he graduated from the University of Maryland, College Park. While at college he wrote and was editor for The Diamondback, and became friends with contemporary David Mills.

== Career ==
External videos
- Author, Screenwriter, & Producer David Simon: 2010 MacArthur Fellow MacArthur Foundation
- A Conversation with President Obama and The Wire Creator David Simon, The White House

=== Journalism ===
Upon leaving college, Simon worked as a police reporter at The Baltimore Sun from 1982 to 1995. Simon was hired by the Baltimore Sun for a piece he wrote about Lefty Driesell, who was then the men's basketball coach at the University of Maryland. Driesell had been extremely frustrated that one of his players was suspended from playing for sexual impropriety and called the victim, threatening to destroy her reputation if she did not withdraw her complaint. This was all done while the university administration was listening to the call, but they did nothing. Lefty Driesell was later given a 5-year contract and, in 2018, he was inducted into the ACC Hall of Fame.

Simon spent most of his career covering the crime beat. A colleague has said that Simon loved journalism and felt it was "God's work". Simon says that he was initially altruistic and was inspired to enter journalism by The Washington Post's coverage of Watergate but became increasingly pragmatic as he gained experience.

Simon was a union captain when the writing staff went on strike in 1987 over benefit cuts. He remained angry after the strike ended and began to feel uncomfortable in the writing room. He searched for a reason to justify a leave of absence and settled on the idea of writing a novel. "I got out of journalism because some sons of bitches bought my newspaper and it stopped being fun," said Simon.

In 1988, disillusioned, Simon took a year's leave to go into the Baltimore Police Department Homicide Unit to write a book.

=== Book ===
==== Homicide: A Year on the Killing Streets ====
Simon's leave of absence from The Sun resulted in his first book Homicide: A Year on the Killing Streets (1991). The book was based on his experiences shadowing the Baltimore Police Department homicide unit during 1988. The idea came from a conversation on Christmas Eve 1985 in the unit office, where Det. Bill Lansey told him, "If someone just wrote down what happens in this place for one year, they'd have a goddamn book." Simon approached the police department and the editors of the paper to receive approval. The detectives were initially slow to accept him, but he persevered in an attempt to "seem … like part of the furniture". However, he soon ingratiated himself with the detectives, saying in the closing notes of the book, "I shared with the detectives a year's worth of fast-food runs, bar arguments and station house humor: Even for a trained observer, it was hard to remain aloof." During one instance, Simon even assisted with an arrest. Two detectives Simon was riding with pulled their car to a curb to apprehend two suspects, but Detective Dave Brown got his trenchcoat caught in a seat belt when he tried to exit the car. Brown told Simon to assist Detective Terry McLarney himself, and Simon helped apprehend and search one of the suspects.

The book won the 1992 Edgar Award for Best Fact Crime book. The Associated Press called it "a true-crime classic". The Library Journal also highly recommended it, and Newsday described it as "one of the most engrossing police procedural mystery books ever written". Simon credits his time researching the book as altering his writing style and informing later work. He learned to be more patient in research and writing, and said a key lesson was not promoting himself but concentrating on his subjects. Simon told Baltimore's City Paper in 2003 that Homicide was not traditional journalism. "I felt Homicide the book and The Corner were not traditional journalism in the sense of coming from some artificially omniscient, objective point of view," said Simon. "They're immersed in the respective cultures that they cover in a way that traditional journalism often isn't."

=== Television ===
==== Homicide: Life on the Street ====
The publishers of Homicide: A Year on the Killing Streets were eager for a screen adaptation and submitted it to numerous directors but there was little interest. Simon suggested that they send the book to Baltimore native and film director Barry Levinson. Levinson's assistant Gail Mutrux enjoyed the book and both she and Levinson became attached as producers. The project became the award-winning TV series Homicide: Life on the Street (1993–1999), on which Simon worked as a writer and producer.

Simon was asked by Mutrux to write the show's pilot episode but declined, feeling he did not have the necessary expertise. He collaborated with his old college friend David Mills to write the season two premiere "Bop Gun". The episode was based on a story by executive producer Tom Fontana and featured Robin Williams in a guest starring role that garnered the actor an Emmy nomination. Simon and Mills won the WGA Award for Best Writing in a Drama for the episode. Simon also received Austin Film Festival's Outstanding Television Writer Award in 2010.

Simon left his job with the Baltimore Sun in 1995 to work full-time on Homicide: Life on the Street during the production of the show's fourth season. Simon wrote the teleplay for the season four episodes "Justice: Part 2" and "Scene of the Crime" (with Anya Epstein). For season five he was the show's story editor and continued to contribute teleplays writing the episodes "Bad Medicine" and "Wu's on First?" (again with Epstein). He was credited as a producer on the show's sixth and seventh seasons. He wrote the teleplays for parts two and three of the sixth-season premiere "Blood Ties" (the latter marking his third collaboration with Epstein) and provided the story for the later sixth-season episodes "Full Court Press" and "Finnegan's Wake" (with James Yoshimura). He provided the story for the seventh season episodes "Shades of Gray" (with Julie Martin), "The Same Coin" (again with Yoshimura) and "Self Defense" (with Eric Overmyer). Simon wrote the story and teleplay for the seventh season episodes "The Twenty Percent Solution" and "Sideshow: Part 2". Simon, Martin and teleplay writer T. J. English won the Humanitas Prize in the 60 minutes category for the episode "Shades of Gray". Simon was nominated for a second WGA Award for Best Writing in a Drama for his work on "Finnegan's Wake" with Yoshimura and Mills (who wrote the teleplay).

Simon has said that he thought the show was a "remarkable drama" but that it did not reflect the book. He has also said that when writing for the show he had to put his experiences of the real detectives aside as the characters became quite different, particularly in their more philosophical approach to the job. Simon said that TV must find shorthand ways of referencing anything real.

==== The Corner ====
In 1997 he co-authored, with Ed Burns, The Corner: A Year in the Life of an Inner-City Neighborhood, the true account of a West Baltimore community dominated by a heavy drug market. Simon credits his editor John Sterling with the suggestion that he observe a single drug corner. He took a second leave of absence from the Baltimore Sun in 1993 to research the project. Simon became close to one of his subjects, drug addict Gary McCullough, and was devastated by his death while he was writing the project. Simon says that he approached the research with the abstract idea that his subjects may die because of their addictions but it was not possible to fully prepare for the reality. He remains grateful to his subjects saying "This involved people's whole lives, there's no privacy in it. That was an enormous gift which many, many people gave us. Even the most functional were at war with themselves. But they were not foolish people. And they made that choice."

The Corner was named a Notable Book of the Year by The New York Times. Simon again returned to his journalism career after finishing the book but felt further changed by his experiences. He said he "was less enamored of the braggadocio, all that big, we're-really-having-an-impact talk" and no longer believed that they were making a difference; he left his job at The Sun within a year for work on NBC's Homicide.

Soon after Homicide concluded Simon co-wrote (with David Mills) and produced The Corner as a six-hour TV miniseries for HBO.

==== The Wire ====
Simon was the creator, show runner, executive producer and head writer of the HBO drama series The Wire for five seasons. Many of The Wire's characters and incidents also came from Homicide: A Year on the Killing Streets. After the fourth season, Simon signed on to produce the fifth and final season of The Wire, which focused on the role of mass media in society.

Again he worked with Ed Burns on creating the show. Originally they set out to create a police drama loosely based on Burns' experiences when working on protracted investigations of violent drug dealers using surveillance technology. During this time Burns had often faced frustration with the bureaucracy of the police department, which Simon equated with his own ordeals as a police reporter for The Baltimore Sun. Writing against the background of current events, including institutionalized corporate crime at Enron and institutional dysfunction in the Catholic Church, the show became "more of a treatise about institutions and individuals than a straight cop show."

They chose to take The Wire to HBO because of their existing working relationship from The Corner. Owing to its reputation for exploring new areas, HBO was initially dubious about including a cop drama in their lineup, but eventually agreed to produce the pilot after ordering a further two scripts to see how the series would progress. Carolyn Strauss, the president of HBO entertainment, has said that Simon's argument that the most subversive thing HBO could do was invade the networks' "backyard" of police procedurals helped to persuade them.

The theme of institutional dysfunction was expanded across different areas of the city as the show progressed. The second season focused on the death of working-class America through examination of the city ports. The third season "reflects on the nature of reform and reformers, and whether there is any possibility that political processes, long calcified, can mitigate against the forces currently arrayed against individuals." For the fourth season Simon again turned to Burns' experience, this time his second career as a Baltimore public school teacher in examining the theme of education. The fifth season looked at the media, as well as continuing themes such as politics from earlier seasons.

Simon was reunited with his The Corner producers Robert F. Colesberry and Nina K. Noble on The Wire. Simon credits Colesberry for achieving the show's realistic visual feel. They recruited Homicide star and director Clark Johnson to helm the pilot episode. The completed pilot was given to HBO in November 2001. Johnson returned to direct the second episode when the show was picked up, and would direct the series finale as well, in addition to starring in the fifth season.

Simon approached acclaimed crime fiction authors to write for The Wire. He was recommended the work of George Pelecanos by a colleague while working at the Baltimore Sun because of similarities between their writing. The two writers have much in common including a childhood in Silver Spring, attendance at the University of Maryland and their interest in the "fate of the American city and the black urban poor." Simon did not read Pelecanos initially because of territorial prejudice; Pelecanos is from Washington. Once Simon received further recommendations including one from his wife Laura Lippman he tried Pelecanos' novel The Sweet Forever and changed his mind. He sought out Pelecanos when recruiting writers for The Wire. The two met at the funeral of a mutual friend shortly after Simon delivered the pilot episode. Simon pitched Pelecanos the idea of The Wire as a novel for television about the American city as Pelecanos drove him home. Pelecanos became a regular writer and later a producer for the show's second and third seasons. Simon and Pelecanos collaborated to write the episode "Middle Ground" which received the show's first Emmy nomination, in the category Outstanding Writing for a Drama Series.

Pelecanos left the production staff following the third season to focus on his next novel; Simon has commented that he missed having him working on the show full-time but was pleased that he continued to write for them and was a fan of the resultant book The Night Gardener. Similar to Simon's own experience in researching Homicide Pelecanos spent time embedded with the Washington DC homicide unit to research the book.

Crime novelist Dennis Lehane has also written for the series starting with the third season. Lehane has commented that he was impressed by Simon and Burns' ear for authentic street slang.

Eric Overmyer was brought in to fill the role of Pelecanos as a full-time writer producer. He had previously worked with Simon on Homicide where the two became friends. Simon has said that he was impressed with Overmyer's writing particularly in synthesizing the story for "Margin of Error" as the episode is the height of the show's political storyline but must also progress other plot threads.

Simon and his writing staff were nominated for the Writers Guild of America Award for Best Dramatic Series at the February 2009 ceremony for their work on the fifth season. Simon and Burns collaborated to write the series finale "-30-" which received the show's second Emmy nomination, again in the category Outstanding Writing for a Drama Series.

Simon has stated that he finds working with HBO more comfortable than his experiences with NBC on Homicide and that HBO is able to allow greater creative control because it is dependent on subscribers rather than on viewing figures. He has said that he feels unable to return to network television because he felt pressure to compromise storytelling for audience satisfaction.

==== Generation Kill ====
Simon produced and wrote Generation Kill for HBO with Ed Burns. They again worked with Nina Noble as a producer. The miniseries is an adaption of the non-fiction book of the same name. It relates the first 40 days of the 2003 invasion of Iraq as experienced by 1st Reconnaissance Battalion and their embedded reporter, Evan Wright. Simon and Burns worked with Wright in adapting his book into the series.

==== Treme ====
Simon collaborated with Eric Overmyer again on Treme, a project about musicians in post-Katrina New Orleans. Overmyer lives part-time in New Orleans, and Simon believed his experience would be valuable in navigating the "ornate oral tradition" of the city's stories. Simon also consulted with New Orleans natives Donald Harrison Jr., Kermit Ruffins, and Davis Rogan while developing the series. The show focuses on a working-class neighborhood, and is smaller in scope than The Wire. The series premiered on April 11, 2010, on HBO and ran for four seasons.

Treme is named after the Faubourg Treme neighborhood in New Orleans that is home to many of the city's musicians. Simon stated that the series would explore beyond the music scene to encompass political corruption, the public housing controversy, the criminal-justice system, clashes between police and Mardi Gras Indians, and the struggle to regain the tourism industry after the storm. One of the principal characters in the pilot script runs a restaurant. The series was filmed on location and was expected to provide a boost to the New Orleans economy. Simon's casting of the show mirrored that of The Wire in using local actors wherever possible. Wendell Pierce, who had previously played Bunk Moreland on The Wire, stars in the series. Clarke Peters, also of The Wire, is another series regular. Many other stars of The Wire have appeared in Treme, these include Steve Earle, Jim True-Frost, James Ransone, and Anwan Glover.

==== Show Me a Hero ====
In 2014, HBO greenlit production for Simon's next project Show Me a Hero, a six-hour miniseries co-written with William F. Zorzi and the episodes directed by Academy Award-winner Paul Haggis. The miniseries is an adaptation of the nonfiction book of the same name by Lisa Belkin and tells the story of Nick Wasicsko, the youngest big-city mayor in the country who is thrust into racial controversy when a federal court orders to build a small number of low-income housing units in the white neighborhoods of Yonkers, New York. Oscar Isaac stars as Wasicsko and leads a cast, which includes Catherine Keener, Jim Belushi, Bob Balaban and Winona Ryder. The miniseries premiered on August 16, 2015.

==== The Deuce ====
The Deuce is a 2017 drama television series set in Times Square, New York focusing on the rise of the porn industry in the 1970s-80s. Created and written by Simon along with frequent collaborator George Pelecanos, the series pilot began shooting in October 2015. It was picked up to series in January 2016. It premiered on September 10, 2017, and is broadcast by HBO in the United States.

The Deuce tells the story of the legalization and ensuing rise of the porn industry in New York beginning in the 1970s and its ongoing rise through the mid-1980s. Themes explored include the rise of HIV, the violence of the drug epidemic and the resulting real estate booms and busts that coincided with the change.

==== The Plot Against America ====
An adaptation of Philip Roth's novel, The Plot Against America is an alternate history told through the eyes of a working-class Jewish family in Newark, New Jersey; as they watch the political rise of Charles Lindbergh, an aviator-hero and xenophobic populist, who becomes president and turns the nation toward fascism. The six-part miniseries premiered on March 16, 2020, on HBO.

==== We Own This City ====
A miniseries based on the nonfiction book of the same name by Baltimore Sun reporter Justin Fenton. The miniseries details the rise and fall of the Baltimore Police Department's Gun Trace Task Force and the corruption surrounding it. The six-part miniseries premiered on April 25, 2022, on HBO.

=== Cancelled and upcoming projects ===
- Parting the Waters: With Taylor Branch, James McBride, Ta-Nehisi Coates, and Eric Overmyer. About Martin Luther King Jr. and the Civil Rights Movement, based on one of the volumes of the books America in the King Years written by Taylor Branch, specifically At Canaan's Edge: America in the King Years, 1965–1968. The project was to be produced by Oprah Winfrey, but was shelved.
- The Avenue: A book with William F. Zorzi Jr., on the Baltimore drug epidemic from 1951 to late 1980s.
- The Good Friday Plot: Miniseries about Abraham Lincoln based upon Manhunt: The Twelve-Day Chase for Lincoln's Killer by James L. Swanson and American Brutus: John Wilkes Booth and the Lincoln Conspiracies by Michael W. Kauffman. The show was to be executive produced by Simon and Tom Fontana. Manhunt was later adapted by a different team as a miniseries for Apple TV+ in 2024, created by Monica Beletsky.
- Capitol Hill: A collaboration with Carl Bernstein set in Capitol Hill, it examines partisanship and the role money plays in influencing national governance. The series was ordered to pilot by HBO in 2015, but has not received a subsequent season order.
- Legacy of Ashes: On the Central Intelligence Agency, based on the 2007 book Legacy of Ashes by Tim Weiner. The show was taken to the BBC and would have had Anthony Bourdain and Ed Burns on the writing staff.
- The Pogues: Musical project with the help of the late Philip Chevron in development at The Public Theater in New York City, with Laura Lippman and George Pelecanos, focused on the band The Pogues.
- A Dry Run: The Lincolns in Spain: A historical miniseries set during the Spanish Civil War about the Abraham Lincoln and George Washington Battalions, which were composed of volunteers from the United States who wanted to help the Spanish Republic overcome fascism. Mark Johnson will be the series producer and Mediapro will be the series' production company.

== Writing process ==
Simon is known for his realistic dialogue and journalistic approach to writing. He says that authenticity is paramount and that he writes not with a general audience in mind but with the opinions of his subjects as his priority. He has described his extensive use of real anecdotes and characters in his writing as "stealing life".

In a talk that Simon gave to a live audience in April 2007 at the Creative Alliance's storytelling series, Simon disclosed that he had started writing for revenge against John Carroll and Bill Marimow, the two most senior editors at The Baltimore Sun when Simon was a reporter at the paper. Simon said he had watched Carroll and Marimow "single-handedly destroy" the newspaper and that he spent over ten years trying to get back at them.

Anything I've ever accomplished as a writer, as somebody doing TV, anything I've ever done in life, down to, like, cleaning up my room, has been accomplished because I was going to show people that they were fucked up, wrong, and that I was the fucking center of the universe and the sooner they got hip to that, the happier they would all be.

One of the actions Simon took was to name a character in The Wire after Marimow and make the character "a repellent police-department toady." Carroll left The Baltimore Sun to become editor at the Los Angeles Times and resigned in 2005 after budget cuts were announced. "He stands up like a [bleeping] hero, takes a bullet," said Simon. In 2006 Marimow was diagnosed with prostate cancer, something that Simon said "took the edge off" his grudge. Carroll and Marimow "were fuel for 10 years of my life. ... And now, I got nothing," Simon said.

When asked about these comments, Simon said that he had spoken with "some hyperbole and, I hope, comic effect", adding that his basic viewpoint was: "that simple revenge is both empty and beside the point and that a good story carefully told has to speak to larger themes. You do not tell an ornate, careful story over ten hours of HBO airtime merely to bust on any given soul."

=== Views on journalism ===
In an interview in Reason in 2004, Simon said that since leaving the newspaper business he has become more cynical about the power of journalism. "One of the sad things about contemporary journalism is that it actually matters very little. The world now is almost inured to the power of journalism. The best journalism would manage to outrage people. And people are less and less inclined to outrage," said Simon. "I've become increasingly cynical about the ability of daily journalism to effect any kind of meaningful change. I was pretty dubious about it when I was a journalist, but now I think it's remarkably ineffectual."

While testifying at a May 2009 Senate hearing regarding the future of journalism in America, Simon indicated what he saw as poor online journalism, calling the phrase citizen journalist "Orwellian to [his] ears." Simon ended his testimony by declaring, "I don't think anything can be done to save high-end journalism." The next month, Simon spoke about the future of professional journalism in remarks at a National Press Club meeting.

== Political views ==
Simon has described himself as a social democrat, broadly supporting the existence of capitalism while opposing "raw, unencumbered capitalism, absent any social framework, absent any sense of community, without regard to the weakest and most vulnerable classes in society", which he described as "a recipe for needless pain, needless human waste, (and) needless tragedy". He has criticized the idea of trickle-down economics.

In 2013, Simon compared the global surveillance disclosures uncovered by Edward Snowden to a 1980s effort by the City of Baltimore to record the numbers dialed from all pay phones. The city believed that drug traffickers were using pay phones and pagers, and a municipal judge allowed the city to record the dialed numbers. The placement of the payphone number recorders formed the basis of The Wire's first season. Simon argued that the media attention regarding the surveillance disclosures is a "faux scandal."

During a November 2013 speech at the Festival of Dangerous Ideas in Sydney, he said that America has become "a horror show" of savage inequality as a result of capitalism run amok, and that "unless we reverse course, the average human being is worthless on planet Earth. Unless we take stock of the fact that maybe socialism and the socialist impulse has to be addressed again; it has to be married as it was married in the 1930s, the 1940s and even into the 1950s, to the engine that is capitalism."

Simon has also spoken out publicly against crime journalist Kevin Deutsch, disputing the portrayal of Baltimore's illegal drug trade in Deutsch's book, Pill City: How Two Honor Roll Students Foiled the Feds and Built a Drug Empire. Simon has described the book as "a wholesale fabrication."

During the 2016 Democratic presidential primaries, Simon praised Bernie Sanders for "rehabilitating and normalizing the term socialist back into American public life", but opposed some attacks against Hillary Clinton which he felt focused on her presumed motives rather than the substance of policies.

In April 2022, David Simon thanked Russian opposition leader Alexei Navalny for using a quote from the TV series The Wire in his court speech and wished good luck to the politician.

== Personal life ==
In 1991, Simon married graphic artist Kayle Tucker. They had a son. The marriage ended in divorce.

In 2006, Simon married best-selling Baltimore novelist and former Sun reporter Laura Lippman in a ceremony officiated by John Waters. They have a daughter, who was born in 2010. Lippman and Simon separated in 2020, divorcing in 2024. The two continue to co-parent their daughter.

Simon's nephew, Jason Simon, is a guitarist and vocalist for the psychedelic rock band Dead Meadow. The band was mentioned in an episode of The Wire.

Simon was the 2012 commencement speaker for the Georgetown University College of Arts and Sciences, as well as the speaker for the Bethesda-Chevy Chase High School graduation.

In 2019, Simon joined several other writers in firing their agents as part of the Writers Guild of America's stand against the Association of Talent Agents after failing to come to an agreement on their "Code of Conduct". Simon's statement to the writers union was widely circulated. He had previously criticized the practice of packaging by the major talent agencies.

== Works and publications ==
=== Commentary ===
- Simon, David (January 20, 2008). "Does the News Matter To Anyone Anymore?". The Washington Post. Archived from the original on May 16, 2008.
- Simon, David (March 1, 2009). "In Baltimore, No One Left to Press the Police". The Washington Post. Archived from the original on March 12, 2009.
- Simon, David (July–August 2009). "Build the Wall". Columbia Journalism Review. Archived from the original on October 4, 2009.

=== Non-fiction books ===
- Simon, David (1991). Homicide: A Year on the Killing Streets. Boston: Houghton Mifflin. ISBN 978-0-395-48829-4. OCLC 23356235. OL 2157541W. Wikidata Q1387845.
- Simon, David; Burns, Edward (1997). The Corner: A Year in the Life of an Inner-City Neighborhood. New York: Broadway Books. ISBN 978-0-767-90030-0. OCLC 36857674

== Filmography ==
=== Producer ===
Year	Show	Role	Notes
1996	Homicide: Life on the Street	Story editor	Season 5
1997	Homicide: Life on the Street	Story editor	Season 5
1997	Homicide: Life on the Street	Producer	Season 6
1998	Homicide: Life on the Street	Producer	Season 6
1998	Homicide: Life on the Street	Producer	Season 7
1999	Homicide: Life on the Street	Producer	Season 7
2000	The Corner	Executive producer, showrunner, writer	Miniseries
2002	The Wire	Executive producer, showrunner, writer	Season 1
2003	The Wire	Executive producer, showrunner, writer	Season 2
2004	The Wire	Executive producer, showrunner, writer	Season 3
2006	The Wire	Executive producer, showrunner, writer	Season 4
2008	The Wire	Executive producer, showrunner, writer	Season 5
2008	Generation Kill	Executive producer, showrunner, writer	Miniseries
2010	Treme	Executive producer, showrunner, writer	Season 1
2011	Treme	Executive producer, showrunner, writer	Season 2
2012	Treme	Executive producer, showrunner, writer	Season 3
2013	Treme	Executive producer, showrunner, writer	Season 4
2015	Show Me a Hero	Executive producer, showrunner, writer	Miniseries
2017	The Deuce	Executive producer, showrunner, writer	Season 1
2018	The Deuce	Executive producer, showrunner, writer	Season 2
2019	The Deuce	Executive producer, showrunner, writer	Season 3
2020	The Plot Against America	Executive producer, showrunner, writer	Miniseries
2022	We Own This City	Executive producer, showrunner, writer	Miniseries

=== Writer ===
Television shows for which David Simon had writing credit
Year	Show	Season	Episode title	Episode	Notes
1994	Homicide: Life on the Street	2	"Bop Gun"	1	Teleplay by Simon and David Mills from a story by Tom Fontana
1996	NYPD Blue	3	"Hollie and the Blowfish"	17	Teleplay by Simon, story by Simon and Bill Clark
1996	Homicide: Life on the Street	4	"Justice: Part 2"	14	Teleplay by Simon from a story by Tom Fontana and Henry Bromell
1996	Homicide: Life on the Street	4	"Scene of the Crime"	18	Teleplay by Simon and Anya Epstein from a story by Tom Fontana, Henry Bromell and Barry Levinson
1996	Homicide: Life on the Street	5	"Bad Medicine"	4	Teleplay by Simon from a story by Tom Fontana and Julie Martin
1997	Homicide: Life on the Street	5	"Wu's on First?"	15	Teleplay by Simon and Anya Epstein from a story by Julie Martin and James Yoshimura
1997	Homicide: Life on the Street	6	"Blood Ties: Part 2"	2	Teleplay by Simon from a story by Tom Fontana and James Yoshimura
1997	Homicide: Life on the Street	6	"Blood Ties: Part 3"	3	Teleplay by Simon and Anya Epstein from a story by Tom Fontana, Julie Martin and James Yoshimura
1998	Homicide: Life on the Street	6	"Full Court Press"	18	Teleplay by Phillip B. Epstein from a story by Simon
1998	Homicide: Life on the Street	6	"Finnegan's Wake"	21	Teleplay by David Mills from a story by Simon and James Yoshimura
1999	Homicide: Life on the Street	7	"Shades of Gray"	10	Teleplay by T. J. English from a story by Simon and Julie Martin
1999	Homicide: Life on the Street	7	"The Same Coin"	12	Teleplay by Sharon Guskin from a story by Simon and James Yoshimura
1999	Homicide: Life on the Street	7	"Sideshow: Part 2"	15	Writer
1999	Homicide: Life on the Street	7	"Self Defense"	18	Story
2000	The Corner	1	"Gary's Blues"	1	Writer
2000	The Corner	1	"DeAndre's Blues"	2	Writer
2000	The Corner	1	"Dope Fiend Blues"	4	Writer
2000	The Corner	1	"Corner Boy's Blues"	5	Writer
2000	The Corner	1	"Everyman's Blues"	6	Writer
2002	The Wire	1	"The Target"	1	Story and teleplay
2002	The Wire	1	"The Detail"	2	Story and teleplay
2002	The Wire	1	"The Buys"	3	Story and teleplay
2002	The Wire	1	"Old Cases"	4	Story and teleplay
2002	The Wire	1	"The Pager"	5	Story
2002	The Wire	1	"The Wire"	6	Story and teleplay
2002	The Wire	1	"One Arrest"	7	Story
2002	The Wire	1	"Lessons"	8	Story and teleplay
2002	The Wire	1	"Game Day"	9	Story
2002	The Wire	1	"The Cost"	10	Story and teleplay
2002	The Wire	1	"The Hunt"	11	Story
2002	The Wire	1	"Cleaning Up"	12	Story
2002	The Wire	1	"Sentencing"	13	Writer
2003	The Wire	2	"Ebb Tide"	1	Story and teleplay
2003	The Wire	2	"Collateral Damage"	2	Story and teleplay
2003	The Wire	2	"Hot Shots"	3	Story and teleplay
2003	The Wire	2	"Hard Cases"	4	Story
2003	The Wire	2	"Undertow"	5	Story
2003	The Wire	2	"All Prologue"	6	Story and teleplay
2003	The Wire	2	"Backwash"	7	Story
2003	The Wire	2	"Duck and Cover"	8	Story
2003	The Wire	2	"Stray Rounds"	9	Story and teleplay
2003	The Wire	2	"Storm Warnings"	10	Story
2003	The Wire	2	"Bad Dreams"	11	Story
2003	The Wire	2	"Port in a Storm"	12	Story and teleplay
2004	The Wire	3	"Time After Time"	1	Story and teleplay
2004	The Wire	3	"All Due Respect"	2	Story
2004	The Wire	3	"Dead Soldiers"	3	Story
2004	The Wire	3	"Hamsterdam"	4	Story
2004	The Wire	3	"Straight and True"	5	Story
2004	The Wire	3	"Homecoming"	6	Story
2004	The Wire	3	"Back Burners"	7	Story
2004	The Wire	3	"Moral Midgetry"	8	Story
2004	The Wire	3	"Slapstick"	9	Story and teleplay
2004	The Wire	3	"Reformation"	10	Story
2004	The Wire	3	"Middle Ground"	11	Story
2004	The Wire	3	"Mission Accomplished"	12	Story and teleplay
2006	The Wire	4	"Boys of Summer"	1	Story and teleplay
2006	The Wire	4	"Alliances"	5	Story
2006	The Wire	4	"A New Day"	11	Story
2006	The Wire	4	"Final Grades"	13	Story and teleplay
2008	The Wire	5	"More with Less"	1	Story and teleplay
2008	The Wire	5	"Unconfirmed Reports"	2	Story
2008	The Wire	5	"Not for Attribution"	3	Story
2008	The Wire	5	"Transitions"	4	Story
2008	The Wire	5	"React Quotes"	5	Story
2008	The Wire	5	"The Dickensian Aspect"	6	Story
2008	The Wire	5	"Took"	7	Story
2008	The Wire	5	"Clarifications"	8	Story
2008	The Wire	5	"Late Editions"	9	Story
2008	The Wire	5	"-30-"	10	Story and teleplay
2008	Generation Kill	1	"Get Some"	1	Writer
2008	Generation Kill	1	"The Cradle of Civilization"	2	Story
2008	Generation Kill	1	"Screwby"	3	Story
2008	Generation Kill	1	"Combat Jack"	4	Story and teleplay
2008	Generation Kill	1	"A Burning Dog"	5	Story
2008	Generation Kill	1	"Stay Frosty"	6	Story
2008	Generation Kill	1	"Bombs in the Garden"	7	Story and teleplay
2010	Treme	1	"Do You Know What It Means"	1	Teleplay
2010	Treme	1	"Meet De Boys on the Battlefront"	2	Story
2010	Treme	1	"Right Place, Wrong Time"	3	Story
2010	Treme	1	"Shame, Shame, Shame"	5	Story
2010	Treme	1	"Shallow Water, Oh Mama"	6	Story
2010	Treme	1	"Wish Somebody Would Care"	9	Story
2010	Treme	1	"I'll Fly Away"	10	Teleplay
2011	Treme	2	"Everything I Do Gonh Be Funky"	2	Teleplay
2011	Treme	2	"Slip Away"	5	Story
2011	Treme	2	"Carnival Time"	7	Teleplay
2011	Treme	2	"What Is New Orleans?"	9	Story
2011	Treme	2	"Do Whatcha Wanna"	11	Story and teleplay
2012	Treme	3	"Knock With Me - Rock With Me"	1	Story and teleplay
2012	Treme	3	"The Greatest Love"	4	Story
2012	Treme	3	"Promised Land"	7	Story
2012	Treme	3	"Tipitina"	10	Story and teleplay
2013	Treme	4	"Yes We Can Can"	1	Teleplay
2013	Treme	4	"Sunset on Louisianne"	4	Teleplay
2013	Treme	4	"...To Miss New Orleans"	5	Teleplay
2015	Show Me a Hero	1	"Parts 1 & 2"	1 & 2	Story and teleplay
2015	Show Me a Hero	1	"Parts 3 & 4"	3 & 4	Story
2015	Show Me a Hero	1	"Parts 5 & 6"	5 & 6	Story and teleplay
2017	The Deuce	1	"Pilot"	1	Story and teleplay
2017	The Deuce	1	"The Principle is All"	3	Story and teleplay
2017	The Deuce	1	"Au Reservoir"	7	Story
2017	The Deuce	1	"My Name Is Ruby"	8	Story and teleplay
2018	The Deuce	2	"Our Raison d'Etre"	1	Story and teleplay
2018	The Deuce	2	"Inside the Pretend"	9	Story and teleplay
2019	The Deuce	3	"The Camera Loves You"	1	Story and teleplay
2019	The Deuce	3	"That's a Wrap"	7	Story and teleplay
2019	The Deuce	3	"Finish It"	8	Story and teleplay
2020	The Plot Against America	1	"Part 1"	1	Teleplay
2020	The Plot Against America	1	"Part 2"	2	Teleplay
2020	The Plot Against America	1	"Part 4"	4	Teleplay
2020	The Plot Against America	1	"Part 6"	6	Teleplay
2022	We Own This City	1	"Part One"	1	Teleplay
2022	We Own This City	1	"Part Six"	6	Teleplay
