= Ed Burns =

American screenwriter (born 1946)

- Born: Edward P. Burns; January 29, 1946 (age 80); Baltimore, Maryland, U.S.
- Occupations: Screenwriter, television producer, teacher, police officer
- Writing career
- Subjects: Crime fiction, true crime
- Notable works: The Wire, The Corner: A Year in the Life of an Inner-City Neighborhood, Generation Kill

Edward P. Burns (born January 29, 1946) is an American screenwriter and television producer. He has worked closely with writing partner David Simon. For HBO, they have collaborated on The Corner, The Wire, Generation Kill, The Plot Against America, and We Own This City. Burns is a former Baltimore police detective for the homicide and narcotics divisions, and a public school teacher. He often draws upon these experiences for his writing.

== Biography ==
Burns served in the U.S. Army infantry during the Vietnam War. He then served in the Baltimore Police Department for twenty years. When he worked in homicide, his partner was Detective Harry Edgerton, who would later become the basis for Frank Pembleton on the television series Homicide: Life on the Street.

Following his retirement from the police force, Burns became a teacher in the Baltimore public school system. He has said that he stumbled into teaching with little preparation because of the intense demand for teachers in inner-city schools. He taught seventh and eighth grade. Psychologically, he compared the experience of teaching to the Vietnam War.

He found the experience profoundly challenging because of the emotional damage that the vast majority of his students had already experienced before reaching the classroom. He saw his primary role as instilling caring behavior in his pupils. He felt his major impact was in giving the children an example of an "adult who's consistent, who's always there, who always comes through with what he said, then that's a new world for them."

=== The Corner ===
In 1995, he co-authored, with Simon, The Corner: A Year in the Life of an Inner-City Neighborhood, the true account of a West Baltimore community dominated by a heavy drug market. Simon credits his editor John Sterling with the notion that he observe a single drug corner. It was named a Notable Book of the Year by The New York Times. An adaptation of the book, also called The Corner, was produced as a six-hour TV miniseries for HBO. The show received three Emmy Awards.

=== The Wire ===
Burns was a producer, writer, and co-creator (also with Simon) of the HBO series The Wire. They originally set out to create a police drama loosely based on Burns's experiences working on protracted investigations of violent drug dealers using surveillance technology. He had often faced frustration with the bureaucracy of the police department, which Simon equated with his own ordeals as a police reporter for The Baltimore Sun. Writing against the background of current events, including institutionalized corporate crime at Enron and institutional dysfunction in the Catholic Church, the show became "more of a treatise about institutions and individuals than a straight cop show."

They chose to take The Wire to HBO because of their existing working relationship from the 2000 miniseries The Corner. Owing to its reputation for exploring new areas, HBO was initially dubious about including a cop drama in their lineup, but eventually agreed to produce the pilot.

The theme of institutional dysfunction was expanded across different areas of the city as the show progressed. The second season focused on the death of white working class America through examination of the city ports. The third season "reflects on the nature of reform and reformers, and whether there is any possibility that political processes, long calcified, can mitigate the forces currently arrayed against individuals."

Burns has called education the theme of the fourth season. The writing drew extensively on his experience as a teacher. Rather than solely focusing on the school system, the fourth season looks at schools as a porous part of the community that are affected by problems outside their boundaries. Burns states that education comes from many sources other than schools and that children can be educated by other means, including contact with the drug dealers they work for.

The fifth and final season focuses on the media's coverage of crime and corruption in Baltimore, tapping into Simon's past with The Baltimore Sun. Burns was nominated for the Writers Guild of America Award for Best Dramatic Series at the February 2009 ceremony for his work on the fifth season. Simon and Burns collaborated to write the series finale, "-30-". The show was nominated for several Emmys and numerous other awards.

=== Generation Kill ===
Burns traveled to Africa to film a miniseries as a producer and writer for Generation Kill (airdates July 13 to August 24, 2008) for HBO Network. The seven-part miniseries received 10 Emmy nominations. His influence on the show stems from the year he spent in Vietnam. Burns stated that as a writer "(He) can use the universal experience of war to create a realistic scenario for the viewers."

He also drew from his experience as a writer for The Wire. Simon and Burns wrote for both shows and had similar ideas in characterization for the show. Burns stated that he wanted "To make characters into characters, not cliches. Just as we did on The Wire."

=== The Plot Against America ===
Burns co-created the HBO miniseries The Plot Against America with Simon. The six episode miniseries premiered in 2020.

=== We Own This City ===
Burns is an executive producer and writer for the HBO miniseries We Own This City. The series was developed by Simon and George Pelecanos from the non-fiction book of the same name by former The Baltimore Sun reporter Justin Fenton. The series focuses on police corruption in the Baltimore Police Department and particularly the Gun Trace Taskforce.
