= Homicide: Life on the Street season 2 =

1994 American television series season

Homicide: Life on the Street
- Season 2
- DVD cover art for the first two seasons of Homicide: Life on the Street
- Starring: Daniel Baldwin; Richard Belzer; Andre Braugher; Clark Johnson; Yaphet Kotto; Melissa Leo; Jon Polito; Kyle Secor; Ned Beatty
- No. of episodes: 4

Release
- Original network: NBC
- Original release: January 6 – January 27, 1994

Season chronology
- ← Previous; Season 1 Next → Season 3

The second season of Homicide: Life on the Street, an American police procedural drama television series, originally aired in the United States between January 6 and January 27, 1994. Due to low Nielsen ratings during the first season, NBC executives decided to order only a four-episode season, after which they would evaluate the ratings and decide whether to renew the show. Homicide was moved to a new timeslot of Thursdays at 10 p.m. EST, temporarily replacing the legal drama L.A. Law. NBC requested several changes from the series, including fewer episode subplots and less camera movements and jump cuts.

The entire Homicide cast returned for the second season. The uncertainty over Homicide's future was stressful for the cast and crew and the logistics of scheduling the filming around the actors' schedules was difficult. Daniel Baldwin publicly criticized NBC Entertainment president Warren Littlefield over the matter, and it was initially reported Ned Beatty would not return at all. The second season was the last to include original cast member Jon Polito, who was reportedly dismissed because NBC officials were unhappy with his physical appearance. Polito was publicly critical of the show after his dismissal.

The second season marked the debut of Jean de Segonzac as director of photography and Chris Tergesen as music coordinator. The season premiere, "Bop Gun", was the last of the four episodes filmed, but it was the first to be broadcast due to a guest appearance by Robin Williams, which NBC hoped would lead to improved ratings. "Bop Gun" differed from other Homicide episodes because it focused entirely on one story: the murder of a tourist and its impact on her husband, played by Williams. The episodes "See No Evil" and "Black and Blue" featured a suspected police shooting, which was based on a real-life incident in David Simon's book Homicide: A Year on the Killing Streets.

In addition to Williams, several actors made guest appearances throughout the second season, including Julianna Margulies, Wilford Brimley, Isaiah Washington, Adrienne Shelly and a 13-year-old Jake Gyllenhaal. Homicide received generally positive reviews during the season, and the show received one Emmy nomination for Outstanding Guest Actor in a Drama Series for Williams. The "Bop Gun" script won a Writers Guild of America Award. Homicide was often compared to the ABC police drama series NYPD Blue, which Baldwin called "the knockoff of Homicide". While ratings improved during the second season, NBC still demanded further changes to the show before committing to a third season. The first and second seasons of Homicide were released together in a four-DVD box-set on May 27, 2003.

== Cast ==
=== Main ===
- Andre Braugher as Detective Frank Pembleton
- Kyle Secor as Detective Tim Bayliss
- Melissa Leo as Detective Kay Howard
- Yaphet Kotto as Lieutenant Al Giardello
- Daniel Baldwin as Detective Beau Felton
- Clark Johnson as Detective Meldrick Lewis
- Jon Polito as Detective Steve Crosetti
- Richard Belzer as Detective John Munch
- Ned Beatty as Detective Stan Bolander

=== Recurring ===
- Clayton LeBouef as Captain George Barnfather
- Gerald F. Gough as Colonel Burt Granger
- Julianna Margulies as Linda
- Michael S. Kennedy as Lieutenant Jimmy Tyron
- Jeff Mandon as Officer Fred Hellriegel
- Zeljko Ivanek as ASA Ed Danvers

=== Guest ===
- Wilford Brimley as Harry "The Admiral" Prentiss
- Robin Williams as Robert Ellison
- Isaiah Washington as Lane Staley
- Adrienne Shelly as Tanya Auinn
- Jake Gyllenhaal as Matt Ellison

== Episodes ==
When first shown on network television, "Bop Gun" aired out of the order in which it was originally produced as the season's premiere. The DVD of this season presents the episodes in their correct chronological order, restoring all storylines and character developments.

No. overall	No. in season	Title	Directed by	Written by	Original release date	Prod. code	U.S. viewers (millions)
10	1	"See No Evil"	Chris Menaul	Paul Attanasio	January 13, 1994	201	18.2
A friend (Michael Chaban) of Felton kills his ill father (Wilford Brimley) in an assisted suicide, and a suspicious Lewis (Clark Johnson) is assigned to the case. Felton tries to convince Lewis to dispose of evidence so his friend will go free. Lewis wrestles with his conscience, but ultimately decides to help Felton. Meanwhile, Bolander (Ned Beatty) resists new sensitivity training requirements based on his lack of trust for therapists, stemming from his failed marriage. When Pembleton (Andre Braugher) and Bayliss (Kyle Secor) investigate the killing of a drug peddler, Pembleton suspects a police shooting, which upsets Lt. Giardello (Yaphet Kotto).
11	2	"Black and Blue"	Chris Menaul	Story by : Tom Fontana; Teleplay by : James Yoshimura	January 20, 1994	202	15.2
As Pembleton continues his investigation into a suspected police shooting, Giardello pressures him to pursue civilian suspects. To make a point, Pembleton elicits a confession from an innocent man (Isaiah Washington), but Giardello realizes he cannot accept it. Ultimately, Giardello helps Pembleton find the real shooter, a police lieutenant (Michael S. Kennedy) with whom Howard had an affair and for whom she still harbors romantic feelings. Meanwhile, as Munch (Richard Belzer) runs into problems in his love life, the normally-lonely Bolander strikes up a relationship with a young waitress named Linda (Julianna Margulies).
12	3	"A Many Splendored Thing"	John McNaughton	Story by : Tom Fontana; Teleplay by : Noel Behn	January 27, 1994	203	16.4
Pembleton and Bayliss investigate the S&M-related murder of a young woman, which initially makes Bayliss uncomfortable, but ultimately forces him to confront his own darker side. The detectives eventually learn the woman was killed by her neighbor, who accidentally choked her to death during rough sex. In another case, Lewis and Crosetti (Jon Polito) pursue a suspect who killed a man over a $1.49 pen. Lewis is deeply shaken by the seemingly pointless motive. Meanwhile, the despairing Munch crashes the first date of Bolander and Linda, ruining their evening by venting his romantic woes, until Linda offers him words of encouragement.
13	4	"Bop Gun"	Stephen Gyllenhaal	Story by : Tom Fontana; Teleplay by : David Simon & David Mills	January 6, 1994	204	24.9
Baltimore detectives Felton (Daniel Baldwin) and Howard (Melissa Leo) investigate the murder of a tourist who was shot to death in front of her husband Robert Ellison (Robin Williams) and their two young children. The case receives considerable attention from the press and police officials. Ellison struggles with feelings of helplessness and guilt, and becomes offended by the insensitivity of the detectives investigating the case. When the seemingly good-natured 19-year-old Vaughn Perkins (Lloyd Goodman) is identified as the shooter, Howard becomes convinced he is taking the fall for his friends, and desperately tries to learn the truth while Felton closes the case. Final appearance of Det. Steve Crosetti

== Development ==
=== Renewal ===
We had this television show, this ensemble, these incredibly talented executive producers saying we need a home and a family, and, although we weren't prepared to make a huge commitment, we chose not to let them go.

— NBC Entertainment president Warren Littlefield

Nielsen ratings for Homicide: Life on the Street had gradually declined throughout the first season, leaving the show at high risk of cancellation by the time the season concluded. NBC executives asked for several refinements—including fewer episode subplots and less camera movements and jump cuts—before approving a second season. Executive producer Tom Fontana said he was willing "to do anything to keep NBC from forgetting us", although executive producer Barry Levinson said the show would maintain its realistic visual style, claiming, "We want a camera that's almost a participant in the show." Homicide was ultimately renewed, but the producers slightly toned down the show's bleak visual style and hand-held photography motif, and focused more strongly on single stories rather than multiple subplots. Fontana said, "We were experimenting with our first nine episodes. Whenever you try something new, you tend to err on the side of breaking ground. But we'd rather have more people watching, so the colors and lighting are slightly brighter, and the camera movements are not as jarring." However, both Levinson and Fontana insisted the changes were not entirely due to network pressure, but rather were evolutionary developments for the series.

NBC ordered a four-episode second season, which would be broadcast in January 1994 as a mid-year replacement. A decision about whether to renew the show for a third season would then be made based on how those four episodes performed in the ratings. David P. Kalat, author of Homicide: Life on the Street – The Unofficial Companion, credited NBC Entertainment president Warren Littlefield with that move, although Levinson claimed NBC West Coast president Don Ohlmeyer was behind the decision. Ohlmeyer said he believed a better timeslot, less dense stories and less hand-held photography would attract more viewers and help the show succeed better: "For it to succeed long-term, there's a humanity that needs to be brought to the characters. There's more here than there was last year." Littlefield said of Homicide, "It's a show we think has tremendous potential that was not fully realized in the first nine episodes. And that's why we want to make more."

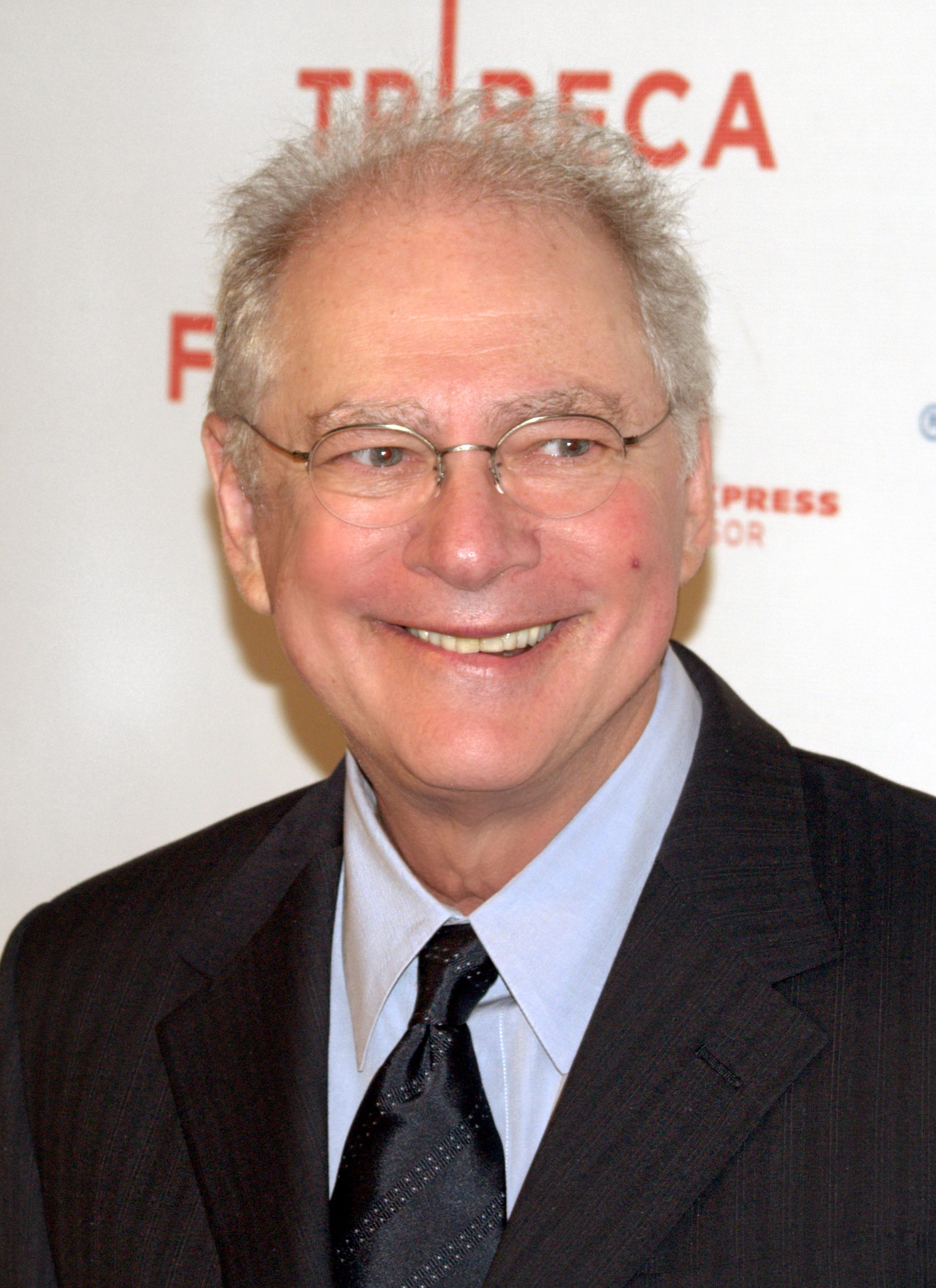
Homicide executive producer Barry Levinson said NBC's decision to evaluate the series after a four-episode season placed a great deal of pressure on the staff.

Homicide was moved from its previous timeslot of Wednesdays at 9 p.m. EST to a new time on Thursdays at 10 p.m. Levinson and the other series producers considered this an extremely positive move for the show, as Homicide suffered greatly in the ratings on Wednesdays due to competition from the highly rated ABC comedy block featuring Home Improvement and Coach. Even during the first season, Levinson often said the series was truly designed for a 10 p.m. timeslot. Homicide took the timeslot previously held by the legal drama L.A. Law, which was placed on a six-week hiatus from December 23 until early February. With some critics claiming L.A. Law had declined in quality, the hiatus led to speculation that it would be canceled and Homicide would replace it. This led to some tension during an NBC reception when L.A. Law star Corbin Bernsen approached Homicide actor Richard Belzer and shouted expletives at him, yelling, "You stole our timeslot!"

The producers of Homicide said the decision to evaluate the series after a four-episode season placed tremendous pressure on the staff of the show. Fontana said one-hour dramas need time to fully develop and allow audiences to become familiar with the characters. Fontana expressed frustration with NBC in some news interviews, claiming the networks seemed to lack the courage to either cancel or renew it: "They will run it in a 10 p.m. time period for a month and then they'll kiss us goodbye ... I'm used to this kind of treatment from NBC. I'm a little surprised they'd treat Barry Levinson the same way they'd treat me." In other interviews, however, Fontana said he saw the decision as a sign of support: "This is not just a casual action on NBC's part. It's a real statement to me that we have a possibility to return." Levinson said he believed "four shots are better than nothing", adding:

What I learned is that it is very hard for a network to make a real commitment. A hit-and-run sensibility is prevalent ... In all fairness to NBC, this is a tougher kind of show than any other show they carry. It is different, and no one is going to endorse different in this world, no one celebrates different.

=== Crew ===
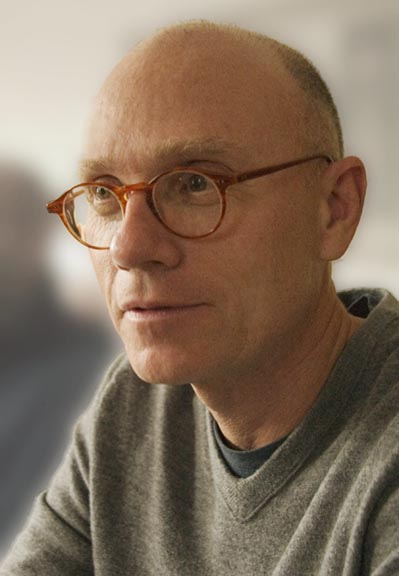
The second season marked the debut of Jean de Segonzac as Homicide's director of photography.

Homicide was produced by Levinson's company Baltimore Pictures, which had partnered with Reeves Entertainment during the first season. However, Reeves Entertainment went out of business after the first season concluded, so NBC bought into the show and formally became a co-producer, which gave the network more latitude to demand creative changes. The second season marked the debut of Jean de Segonzac as director of photography. He replaced Wayne Ewing, who Levinson felt was too inexperienced and did not trust with the responsibility of managing the show's cinematography. Among Segonzac's film credits was Laws of Gravity (1992), which was directed by Nick Gomez, who directed the Homicide first-season episode "Son of a Gun".

Season premiere "Bop Gun" was directed by Stephen Gyllenhaal, a feature director then best known for such films as Waterland (1992) and A Dangerous Woman (1993). Chris Menaul directed the back-to-back episodes "See No Evil" and "Black and Blue", while the season finale, "A Many Splendored Thing", was directed by John McNaughton, who previously directed Homicide star Belzer in the film Mad Dog and Glory (1993). The second season included much of the same crew as the first: in addition to executive producers Levinson and Fontana, Jim Finnerty returned as supervising producer, Debbie Sarjeant worked as associate supervisor and screenwriter James Yoshimura became story editor starting with the second season, with Bonnie Mark as a staff writer and Chris Friel as a script supervisor. Other crew included Cindy Mollo as editor, Vincent Peranio as production designer, Susan Kessel as set decorator, Roland Berman as costume designer, Ivan Fonseca as post-production coordinator, Bruce Litkey as sound mixer and Louis DiGiaimo and Pat Moran as casting directors. Ted Zachary and Allan Chaflin worked as the executives in charge of production.

=== Cast ===
Almost the entire original cast from season one returned for the second season, including Daniel Baldwin, Ned Beatty, Richard Belzer, Andre Braugher, Clark Johnson, Yaphet Kotto, Melissa Leo, Jon Polito and Kyle Secor. The only permanent cast member not to return was Wendy Hughes, who previously played medical examiner Carol Blythe; her absence was never explained on-screen other than a mention in the episode "A Many Splendored Thing" that Bolander and Blythe had broken up. While the rest of the cast was contractually obliged to return, many of them had offers for other films, television shows or plays, and the logistics of arranging their schedules so all of them could return for the show was difficult. In an interview, Fontana claimed the cast was contractually entitled to be paid for 13 episodes but they all agreed to take less money and come back for the shortened-season. The uncertainty over whether Homicide would be renewed or not created a great deal of stress for some cast members. Polito said of the feeling, "Where is limbo? It's in Baltimore." Baldwin in particular expressed frustration with NBC for failing to renew the show for a full season and said he feared the uncertainty could hurt his film career:

For two years now, I've been walking around thinking, 'Why did I do this? Why did I subject myself to this nonsense?' I will never, ever do another series. Ever. Ever. Ever. Ever. There is no justice in television ... Where's the confidence? Why aren't I here talking about being picked up for 22 episodes? I want to say to Warren Littlefield: Can you read? Can you read? I've never seen this kind of critical response to a show before.

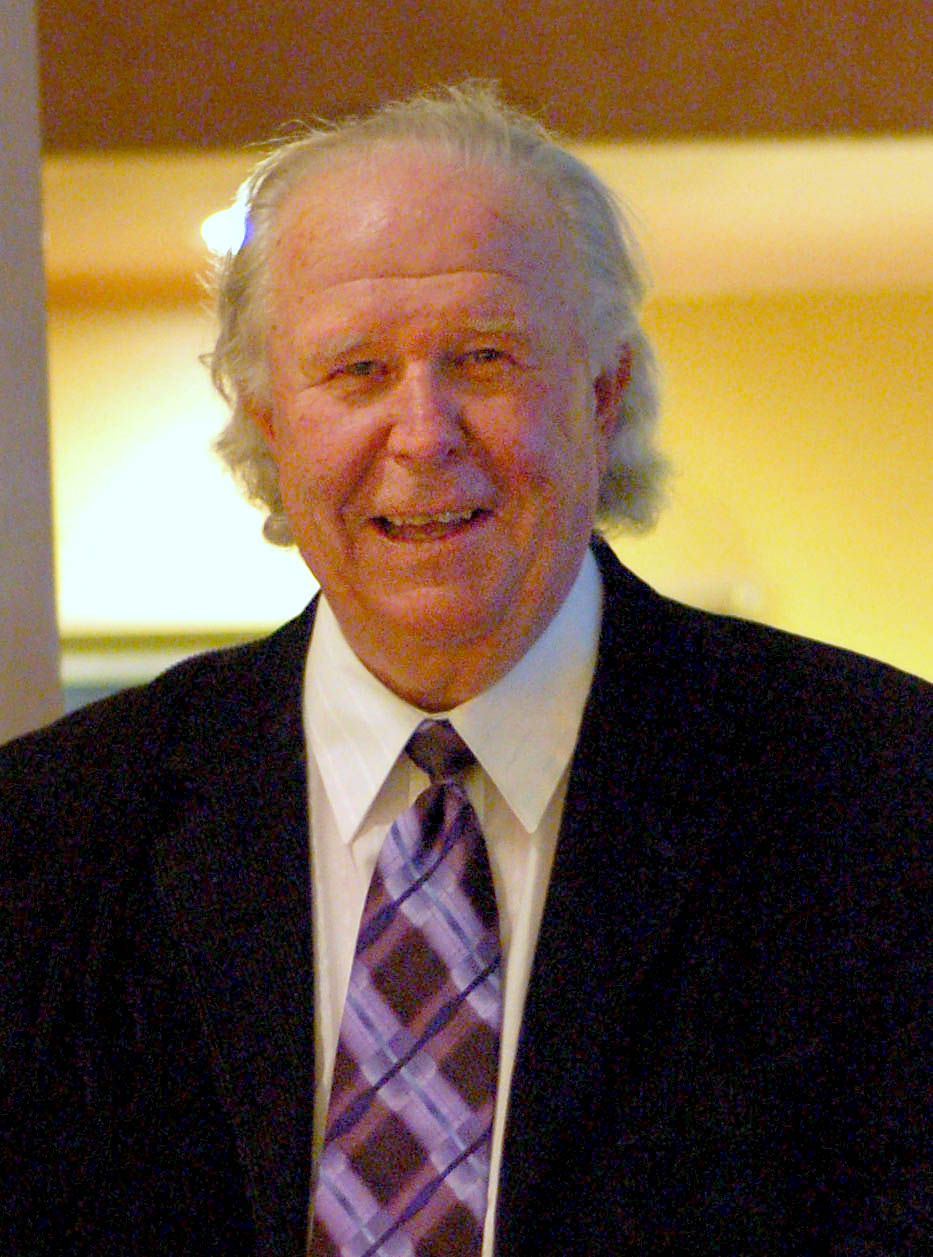
Ned Beatty, who was critical of the business aspect of television filming, was initially reported to be leaving Homicide before the season began, but those reports proved untrue.

Likewise, Beatty said he enjoyed the actual filming of the episodes but hated the television business end of it, claiming, "I can't think of anything I would less rather do than television at this moment." He said the process left him "pretty much burnt" and said his enthusiasm for the show had "eroded as time goes on". It was initially reported that Beatty would not return for the second Homicide season at all because he had accepted a starring role in The Boys, a CBS comedy series also featuring Christopher Meloni. Polito said he did not believe Beatty's departure would hurt the show because of the ensemble nature of the cast: "I love Ned's work, but the show won't fall apart because of one character." Beatty ended up appearing in both shows, and The Boys was canceled after six episodes.

Although Belzer said he and the rest of the cast returned to filming with "guarded emotions", he credited his role as John Munch with giving him credibility as an actor. While he previously had to vigorously pursue roles, he was receiving unsolicited offers by the time of the second season, including a recurring role in the ABC television series Lois & Clark: The New Adventures of Superman. Polito, however, was terminated from the cast after the second season ended, reportedly because NBC officials were unhappy with his weight and physical appearance and did not believe he appealed to audiences. After his dismissal, Polito became publicly critical of the direction Homicide had recently taken, saying it changed to a "parody of itself" and claiming he had repeatedly voiced problems with the show's recent scripts to Fontana and Chris Menaul. Polito said:

It would have killed me to come back. The show went from art to mediocrity. I'm relieved that they've freed me legally. I didn't want to go back to another six months of indecision and hurt. I'm shocked that the other actors re-signed ... The brilliance of the show under Levinson was lost this season. It's like watching the sinking of the Titanic. The problem is that the iceberg is the guys who built the ship—the producers. You can never trust producers. They would have said to van Gogh: 'Nice painting. A little lighter on the colors and we can sell it.'

Several notable actors made guest appearances throughout the second season of Homicide. Robin Williams appeared in "Bop Gun" as Robert Ellison, the husband of a slain woman tourist. Levinson previously directed Williams in the films Good Morning, Vietnam (1987) and Toys (1992). Although Williams was primarily known for his comedic work, the Homicide producers and Williams himself consciously decided to remain true to the original script, rejecting the idea of adding humor or jokes to the episode. "Bop Gun" also featured a 13-year-old Jake Gyllenhaal, son of the episode's director Stephen, in one of his earliest acting performances; he played Matt, the young son of Robert Ellison. Wilford Brimley portrayed the bed-ridden and suicidal Harry Prentice in "See No Evil", Isaiah Washington played murder suspect Lane Staily in "Black and Blue", and Adrienne Shelly portrayed S&M fashion store owner Tanya Quinn in "A Many Splendored Thing". Julianna Margulies appeared in the last two episodes of the season as Linda, a waitress who starts dating Bolander. Fontana was so impressed with Margulies that he offered her a recurring role on Homicide, but she turned it down in favor of the medical drama series ER.

== Production ==
=== Writing ===
By the time the first season ended, four additional scripts for the second season had already been written, but before approving the second season, NBC asked for refinements both in the visual style and in the scripts. From a screenwriting perspective, NBC asked that the scripts place more emphasis on single storylines, rather than multiple subplots; during the first season, some episodes included as many as four separate storylines. The season premiere, "Bop Gun", was the first Homicide episode to revolve entirely around a single plot: the murder of a tourist and its aftermath. Fontana said by focusing on one story, he believed it allows the show to tell that story better, adding, "In some places, there wasn't enough time for the story. The "Bop Gun" script also differed from previous Homicide episodes by focusing more strongly on a murder victim, rather than on the detectives. The other three episodes of the season continued to focus on multiple stories, but switched from four different subplots to three.

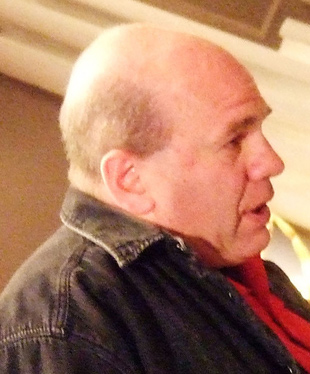
"Bop Gun" was co-written by David Simon, author of Homicide: A Year on the Killing Streets, from which the series was adapted.

"Bop Gun" was written by David Mills and David Simon, the latter of whom wrote the 1991 non-fiction book Homicide: A Year on the Killing Streets, from which the television series was adapted. It was the first television script written by Mills, who previously worked as a reporter and became friends with Simon while studying journalism at the University of Maryland, College Park. Writing the script inspired Mills to quit journalism and start writing for television full-time. Simon felt the script's dialogue was faithful to reality, especially the detectives' use of dark humor as a coping mechanism for dealing with the horrors of the homicide unit. This was particularly embodied by a scene in which the murdered tourist's husband becomes angry after overhearing detectives talk about how much overtime they would get from the case, which Simon claimed was a conversation real-life detectives would really have.

"See No Evil" was written by series creator Paul Attanasio, who had not penned a Homicide script since the series premiere "Gone for Goode". Attanasio deliberately wrote the "See No Evil" script so that it would be morally questionable whether the police handling of both main subplots—the assisted suicide and the suspected police shooting—were done in an ethically correct way. "Black and Blue" was written by James Yoshimura, who continued working on Homicide throughout the entire life of the show, but considered that episode his favorite script. A story arc in "See No Evil" and "Black and Blue" featured Pembleton investigating a suspected police-related shooting. This was based on a real-life 1988 shooting and subsequent investigation by Baltimore Police Department Detective Donald Worden featured in David Simon's book Homicide: A Year on the Killing Streets. Several members of the Baltimore Police Department publicly criticized Homicide for its negative portrayal of the police in the storyline, and 22 detectives wrote a formal letter of protest to Levinson over the matter.

"A Many Splendored Thing" was written by Noel Behn, who became consulting producer with the series. That episode featured a subplot about a man who killed another man over a pen, which was inspired by a real-life murder in Anne Arundel County, Maryland, in which a 23-year-old man shot another man 10 times in a doughnut shop when the victim refused to sell the shooter his pen. Since NBC had not decided on whether to renew Homicide until after the four episodes aired, the screenwriters did not start working on any scripts for the third season until after the second season concluded. As a result, once NBC was committed to renewal, the scripts had to be written later and the Homicide producers were not able to turn around new shows until the fall. Additionally, Fontana was working on other projects, including Philly Heat, an ABC miniseries about members of the Philadelphia Fire Department. Some media outlets criticized NBC for not commissioning Fontana and Levinson to write back-up scripts, which prevented Homicide from starting earlier once the show was renewed. Alan Pergament of The Buffalo News wrote, "Understandably, Fontana didn't sit by idly and wait for NBC to make its decision on Homicide."

=== Filming ===
The four second-season episodes were filmed during the summer of 1993. The last of them, "Bop Gun", was filmed in late September 1993, with Fontana just having returned from accepting an Emmy Award for Outstanding Writing for a Drama Series for the script of first-season episode "Three Men and Adena". Like the first season, they were filmed on location in Baltimore. Levinson was not present for the filming and development of the episodes because he was in Los Angeles shooting Jimmy Hollywood (1994), a comedy film starring Joe Pesci and Christian Slater. Fontana said Levinson remained involved in the development of scripts and the production of the shows.

Among the visual changes during Homicide's second season were brighter colors. While colorist Drexel Williams previously drained footage of color value to create a gritty style, cinematographer Jean de Segonzac directed Williams to make the colors less muted and more lively. Segonzac also sought a more restrained visual style, as he believed the previous cinematographer Wayne Ewing tended to "get a little too wild, and someone could complain they got a little dizzy". Levinson praised what he described as a subtler and more effective style under Segonzac. "Bop Gun" was originally meant to serve as the second-season finale, but NBC decided to make it the season premiere with the hopes of getting increased ratings from Williams' guest appearance. The scenes with Williams were filmed over three days; Fontana said of the shooting, "[Williams] worked like a dog. It was quite a special event for all of us. It's very intense."

=== Music ===
With songs like Seal's "Killer" and Buddy Guy's "Feels Like Rain' played at full volume, Homicide suddenly seemed more urgent and more cool.

— writer David P. Kalat

Chris Tergesen became music coordinator during the second season, and more music is featured than in the previous episodes as a result. The first scene of "Bop Gun", for example, featured the song "Killer" by Seal and Adamski over a brief montage of images just before a murder took place. In that same episode, the Buddy Guy blues song "Feels Like Rain" plays just after Howard speaks with a suspect in jail. Other songs were integrated into the show itself: one suspect listens to the Public Enemy song "Gett off My Back" on headphones just before he was arrested. Various songs are featured in other second-season episodes, including the Gerry Goffin and Carole King song "Up on the Roof" in "Black and Blue", and the Soul Asylum song "Whoa" and Donna Summer song "Bad Girls" in "A Many Splendored Thing". "Black and Blue" ended with Bolander and Linda, on cello and violin respectively, performing a movement of "Passacaglia", a classical music piece composed by George Frideric Handel. Cellist Zuill Bailey served as a body double for Beatty in the scenes with Bolander playing cello.

== Reception ==
=== Reviews ===
Though it is scheduled for only a four-week run, if there's any justice in TV, it should be around much longer ... The show, for all of its superficial similarities to other cop ventures, is wholly original, a shining example of how entertainment television can give us humanity-and lack of it-in all its striking, sometimes frightening colors.

— Rick Kogan, Chicago Tribune

The second season received generally positive reviews. "Bop Gun" was particularly acclaimed; it was named one of the ten best episodes of the series by The Baltimore Sun, and the Star Tribune called Williams' performance one of the ten best guest star moments in television history. The performance of Andre Braugher was also particularly praised, especially for his scene in "Black and Blue", in which Pembleton persuades a suspect to confess to a murder he did not commit. Gail Pennington of the St. Louis Post-Dispatch said the second season was an improvement over the first, which she said was excellent but "tended to demand an awful lot from viewers". Pennington said the toned down visual style and stronger emphasis on single stories better focused the show, adding: "Homicide is great TV, and NBC believes in it enough to give it what may be the network's best time slot." Bob Langford of The News & Observer called Homicide "absolutely brilliant" and praised it for focusing not on the crimes but on the effects of it, as well as the realistic themes regarding race, such as concerns in "Bop Gun" that the murder would deter white tourists from visiting Baltimore. Langford said it was occasionally preachy, but said, "Sometimes, a good sermon is what we need. Amazing that one this powerful can come from a TV show."

Rick Kogan, television critic with the Chicago Tribune, called the show "wholly original" and an example of how good television entertainment can be. He praised the ensemble cast and interesting characters, and said the show would be renewed "if there's any justice in TV". Ray Richmond of the Los Angeles Daily News praised NBC for giving Homicide a second chance, comparing it to the days when NBC stuck with the comedy series Cheers even though it ranked last in the ratings during its first season. Richmond said of Homicide: "This is also one of the final opportunities to see a television network stick with a struggling show for no better reason than it deserves to be stuck with. In the bottom line-driven 1990s, that's become as rare as quality itself. " Steven Cole Smith with the Fort Worth Star-Telegram said of the evaluation period during Homicide's second season: "If you don't watch it, you may lose your right to complain that there's never anything good on TV." He called it "a gritty, atmospheric police series" and complimented it for showing not only gratuitous violence but the consequences of it.

Robert Bianco of the Pittsburgh Post-Gazette praised the show and said the decision to focus on fewer subplots might help. Bianco said, "Let's hope the changes work, because Homicide is too good to lose, and its vision of civilization is too troubling to shunt aside." The Washington Post television reviewer Tom Shales called Homicide "achingly, even painfully, brilliant. The best cop show I have ever seen." David Zurawik of The Baltimore Sun called it the best police drama ever made for television besides Hill Street Blues. Baltimore Sun reporter David Bianculli praised the show's writers for being willing to place their characters in ethically questionable positions, adding: "Please watch this series; it's so good, I don't mind pleading." Tom Jicha of South Florida Sun-Sentinel called it "an hour about as fine as there is on the tube" with great writing and camera-work. Jicha said, "It would be a senseless act of violence against superb TV for those who claim to appreciate fine drama to kill this show by turning the dial." Hal Boedeker, television critic with The Miami Herald, strongly praised the series, particularly "Bop Gun", which he called "the highest order for network TV". Boedeker called the writing, direction and acting "first-rate" and declared Homicide the better choice over NYPD Blue because it did not resort to gimmicks like the nudity featured in the latter show.

=== NYPD Blue ===
NYPD Blue comes out and shows the side of a woman's breast and some risque language on a show not as well-written as our show, although it's wonderfully acted, and it goes through the roof and everyone's talking about it. I'm thinking, "Give us a shot here."

— Daniel Baldwin

The second season of Homicide drew several comparisons to NYPD Blue, an ABC police drama series that had debuted in September 1993. It received a large amount of publicity and better ratings than Homicide, which some reviewers attributed to the violence and nudity featured in the show. Like Homicide, NYPD Blue featured an ensemble cast and intertwined subplots, and commentators suggested its success may have encouraged NBC to support Homicide. Levinson said he was not deterred by comparisons to NYPD Blue because Homicide debuted before that series. In a news article, Fontana quoted a friend who described NYPD Blue as "the television version of Homicide". Baldwin was even more critical of the show, and said in an interview: "The ultimate compliment that can ever be paid [is] to be mimicked by someone else. So, thank you, NYPD Blue, because it's the knockoff of Homicide." NYPD Blue co-creator Steven Bochco took exception to that characterization, saying he believed his reputation and experience in television proved he was capable of conceiving his own material. Bochco said: I don't think it's a knock-off. It was conceived as its own show. I wish Homicide the best – and they should be so lucky as to do as well as we're doing right now."

Pete Schulberg of The Oregonian wrote, "Forget all the commotion about NYPD Blue. Homicide delivers without the lewd language and skin shots. It depicts violence in a most compelling way: You don't see it. You just feel it." Bob Wisehart of The Sacramento Bee said, "The bottom line is that while NYPD Blue is a fine show—it was on my 10-best list for 1993–Homicide is better. There's been nothing like it since the heyday of Hill Street Blues." Elaine Liner, television critic with the Corpus Christi Caller-Times, who called Homicide "as rewarding an hour of serious, quality television as you could ask for", praised it for highlighting quality writing rather than gimmicks like the nudity from NYPD Blue, and praised it for fleshing out not only the detectives and victims, but the suspects too, like in "Bop Gun". Ed Siegel of The Boston Globe wrote, "If [the nudity] is what it took to get you to watch NYPD Blue and you decided to stay because it was grittier, better written, directed and acted than any other drama on TV, be advised that Homicide is so far superior to NYPD Blue in all those categories that if you're not [watching it], you're missing the best hour of episodic television since Hill Street Blues and St. Elsewhere left the air."

=== Ratings ===
NBC heavily advertised the second season, especially the guest appearance by Williams in the season premiere, "Bop Gun". Levinson, Baldwin, Belzer and Fontana all participated in multiple media interviews about the show. "Bop Gun" was seen by 16.3 million viewers, a higher-than-usual Homicide: Life on the Street rating in large part to interest in Williams' appearance. It received a 17.3 Nielsen rating and a 28 share, the highest rating for a 10 p.m. drama series since January 1992. The rating placed Homicide among the top ten network television Nielsen ratings for the week, and outperformed the ratings of L.A. Law, which normally filled the 10 p.m. Thursday timeslot. Warren Littlefield said the ratings "far exceeded expectations", and said he expected the series to return for a third season if the viewership remained strong. Littlefield said of the Homicide ratings:

These are outstanding numbers for a dramatic television series. If we can keep a reasonable level of audience, we believe in the work, we believe in the creative team we think we have, perhaps the most outstanding ensemble cast in all of television. We just would like to see continued signs of life.

The other three episodes of the season did not match the viewership of "Bop Gun", but they were nevertheless considered strong ratings for the show, better than past Homicide episodes and the average rating for L.A. Law. Homicide's improved ratings in the Thursday night timeslot fueled speculation that L.A. Law might be canceled and Homicide would take its place. Warren Littlefield denied such claims, believing the success of one series did not necessarily have to mean the cancellation of the other. Despite Homicide's improvement in the ratings, NBC did not immediately commit to a third season until the producers agreed to even more changes, including more prominent guest stars, more women in the cast and more life-affirming storylines. Outgoing cast member Polito publicly decried these changes, claiming the show was going to change from a drama into a "soap opera".

To cut down on costs, the network also pressured Levinson to relocate filming to California rather than Baltimore, which would reduce costs for travel, lodging and meals. Maryland Governor William Donald Schaefer sent a telegram to Levinson encouraging him to remain in the city: "I wanted you to know that we are proud of having this exceptional series shot in your native state and stand ready to help toward a positive decision for additional production of the series." Levinson and Fontana considered leaving Baltimore not only for the cost savings, but also because of the letters of outrage by the city's detectives over "See No Evil," as well as a report in the Associated Press that the show was giving Baltimore a bad image by drawing attention to its murder rate. Ultimately, however, Levinson decided to remain in Baltimore. On February 15, 1994, the day the options of the cast contracts expired, NBC decided at midnight to sign for a third season, but ordered only 13 episodes instead of a full 22-episode season, opting to wait and see how the ratings performed before committing to the final nine.

=== Awards ===
Robin Williams received an Emmy Award nomination for Guest Actor in a Drama Series for his role in "Bop Gun". It was the only Emmy nomination Homicide: Life on the Street received in the 46th Primetime Emmy Awards; the series received four nominations the previous year. Williams lost the Emmy to Richard Kiley for his performance in the CBS drama series Picket Fences. "Bop Gun" won a Writers Guild of America Award for Best Screenplay of an Episodic Drama. It defeated competing episodes of Northern Exposure and NYPD Blue, as well as another second season Homicide episode, "A Many Splendored Thing".

== DVD release ==
The first and second seasons of Homicide were released together in a four-DVD box-set "Homicide: Life on the Street: The Complete Seasons 1 & 2", which was released by A&E Home Video on May 27, 2003 for $69.95. The set included an audio commentary by Levinson and Fontana for the first-season premiere, "Gone for Goode", as well as a collection of the commercials that advertised the episode during the Super Bowl.
