= Bop Gun =

Bop Gun may refer to:

- "Bop Gun (Endangered Species)", a song by Parliament
- "Bop Gun (One Nation)", a song by rapper Ice Cube
- "Bop Gun" (Homicide: Life on the Street), a television episode
