= Black and Blue (Homicide: Life on the Street) =

- Homicide: Life on the Street episode
- Episode no.: Season 2 Episode 2
- Directed by: Chris Menaul
- Story by: Tom Fontana
- Teleplay by: James Yoshimura
- Cinematography by: Jean de Segonzac
- Production code: 202
- Original air date: January 20, 1994

Guest appearances
- Julianna Margulies as Linda; Isaiah Washington as Lane Staley; Gerald F. Gough as Col. Burt Granger; Mel Proctor as Grant Besser

Episode chronology
← Previous "See No Evil"	Next → "A Many Splendored Thing"
- List of Homicide: Life on the Street episodes

"Black and Blue" is the second episode of the second season of the American police drama television series Homicide: Life on the Street, and the twelfth overall episode of the series. It originally aired on NBC in the United States on January 20, 1994. In the episode, Pembleton aggressively investigates what he believes to be a police-related shooting. Amid pressure from Gee to pursue civilian suspects, Pembleton elicits a successful confession from an innocent man, leaving Gee feeling conflicted. Directed by Chris Menaul, the episode's teleplay was written by James Yoshimura based on a story by series executive producer Tom Fontana.

Yoshimura considered "Black and Blue" the favorite script he wrote for Homicide. Pembleton's investigation was based on a real-life investigation into a suspicious shooting featured in David Simon's non-fiction book Homicide: A Year on the Killing Streets, on which the Homicide series was based. However, fictional elements like Howard's romantic interest in the perpetrator were added so more cast members could be part of the story. Detectives from the Baltimore Police Department wrote a letter of formal protest to executive producer Barry Levinson over the negative portrayal of police in the episode.

"Black and Blue" featured Julianna Margulies as a waitress who befriends Bolander and Isaiah Washington as an innocent man who Pembleton tricks into confessing to murder. Mel Proctor, home team sports announcer for the Washington Bullets, also reprised his recurring role as reporter Grant Besser. According to Nielsen Media Research, the episode was seen by 10.83 million household viewers, a drop from the previous episode "See No Evil". It received generally positive reviews, with critics particularly praising the performance of Andre Braugher.

== Plot ==
Pembleton (Andre Braugher) continues his investigation into the shooting death of drug peddler Charles Courtland Cox, who he suspects was killed by police during a botched crack house raid. As the involved officers turn over their guns for testing, the press reports heavily on the story, which results in pressure from the top brass to solve the case. Pembleton aggressively questions several officers, but none are cooperative. Gee (Yaphet Kotto) is angry with Pembleton's focus and demands civilian suspects be pursued. Howard (Melissa Leo) and Bayliss (Kyle Secor) canvas the neighborhood of the shooting and find most residents do not trust the police, who they feel are responsible for the death of one of their own. However, one woman named Dale (June Thorne) tells Bayliss her grandson, Lane Staley (Isaiah Washington), witnessed the shooting. Staley is brought to the station for questioning, and while Pembleton plans to question him as an eyewitness, Gee demands he be treated as a suspect.

Frustrated that Gee refuses to consider the possibility of a police shooting, Pembleton assures him he will get a confession out of Staley, whether he did it or not. Pembleton starts the interrogation calm and polite, but gradually becomes angrier, frightening Staley. Pembleton makes him feel responsible for allowing Cox to be at the crack house and uses that guilt to break Staley down and confess, even though he is obviously innocent. Pembleton gives the confession to Gee, who is conflicted, especially when Pembleton compares it to past police practices of white detectives getting confessions from black suspects no matter the cost. Ultimately, Gee tears up the confession and instead visits Staley at jail. Staley tells Gee that Lieutenant Jimmy Tyron (Michael S. Kennedy) shot Cox in the back without warning while Cox was running away. Pembleton and Bayliss arrest Tyron at his home, where they confiscate a gun and bullets that appear to match those used against Cox. The arrest deeply saddens Howard, who previously had an affair with Tyron.

Meanwhile, Munch (Richard Belzer) repeatedly and loudly declares his love for his girlfriend Felicia, much to the annoyance of his lonely partner Bolander (Ned Beatty). The two confiscate a live tropical fish from the murder scene of a dead drug dealer. Upon learning it will not be used as evidence, Munch decides to give it as a gift to Felicia, who loves fish. However, she breaks up with Munch after the fish, a Jack Dempsey, ends up eating all her other fish. The now-lonely Munch turns to Bolander for comfort but finds the tables have turned and that Bolander has met a local waitress named Linda (Julianna Margulies). The episode ends with Linda and Bolander getting together to play music: Linda plays the violin, while Bolander plays the cello.

== Production ==
"Black and Blue" was written by James Yoshimura and directed by series executive producer Tom Fontana. Like the other three second-season episodes, the script was already finished by the time the first season ended, but due to poor Nielsen ratings throughout the duration of the show, NBC executives asked for several refinements – including fewer episode subplots and fewer camera movements and jump cuts – before approving a second season. Although Yoshimura continued working on Homicide throughout the entire life of the show, he considered "Black and Blue" his favorite script. Braugher also complimented the writing, particularly during the interrogation scene with his character:

"I didn't dare judge my character before I did that scene. Andre Braugher doesn't judge Frank Pembleton about being right or wrong. It's a way for me to remain blessedly free of conscience. But for me the beauty of that scene was that we really dared to get into it. Typically in TV shows we skim over the edges of issues like water spiders, spouting platitudes and spouting unearned 'clarifying' emotions. But there were no violins strumming in 'Black and Blue'."

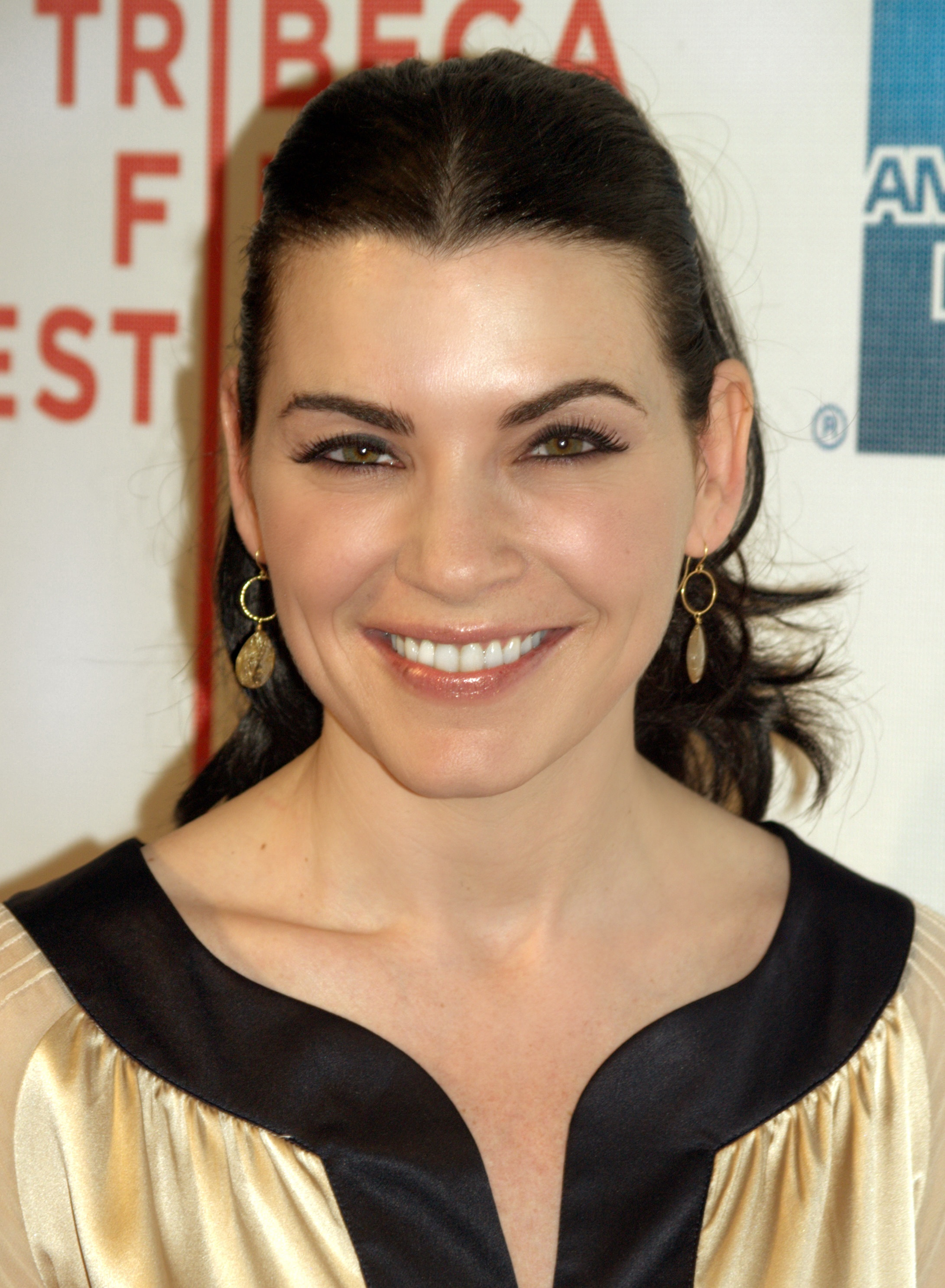
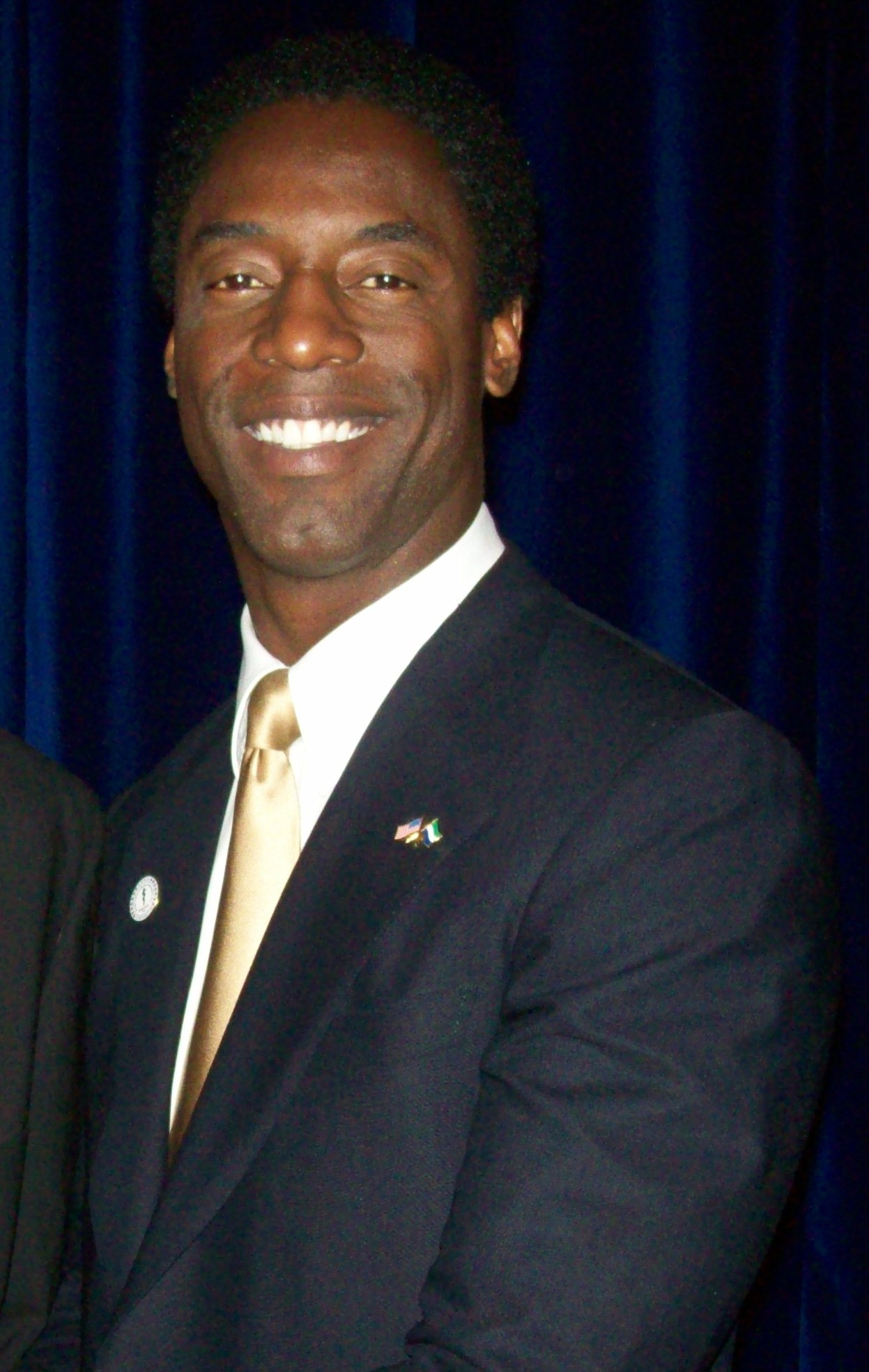
"Black and Blue" featured guest appearances by Julianna Margulies and Isaiah Washington.

Pembleton's investigation of fellow police officers for a suspicious shooting was based on a real-life investigation chronicled in David Simon's 1991 non-fiction book Homicide: A Year on the Killing Streets, from which the Homicide series was adapted. Baltimore Police Department Detective Donald Worden, on whom the Bolander character is based, handled the actual real-life investigation in 1988. However, Howard's affair with the perpetrator was not part of the real-life incident, but rather was added by Yoshimura as part of the show's efforts to ensure as many detectives were personally involved in the storylines as possible. Several members of the Baltimore Police Department publicly criticized Homicide for its negative portrayal of the police in the episode, and 22 detectives wrote a formal letter of protest to executive producer Barry Levinson over the matter. Cellist Zuill Bailey served as a body double for Ned Beatty in the scenes with Bolander playing cello. Bailey was studying at Baltimore's Peabody Conservatory at the time, and his appearance on Homicide led to further collaborations with Tom Fontana, including a recurring guest appearance for Bailey on Fontana's drama series Oz.

The episode featured guest appearances by Isaiah Washington, who went on to play Preston Burke on the medical drama series Grey's Anatomy, and Julianna Margulies, who started her long-running lead role as nurse Carol Hathaway on the medical drama series ER a few months after "Black and Blue" aired. She was cast in the part after having worked with Fontana on the unaired pilot of Philly Heat, an ABC miniseries he worked on about members of the Philadelphia Fire Department. Fontana offered Margulies a recurring role on Homicide, but she turned it down in favor of ER. Michael S. Kennedy, an actor from Richmond, Texas, reprised his role of Lt. Jimmy Tyron from the previous episode, "See No Evil". A struggling actor, Kennedy received a call from a casting director he knew, in the middle of an all-night Virginia Beach shoot for a small role in Assault at West Point: The Court-Martial of Johnson Whittaker, giving him one day's notice of the audition for Homicide. He so enjoyed working on the show that he wrote a Homicide script himself, with the Tyron character playing a major part, although it was ultimately never used. "Black and Blue" also featured the second of five guest appearances by Mel Proctor, then the home team sports announcer for the Washington Bullets, as Grant Besser, a recurring reporter character in Homicide.

The songs "Slow Fire" by Just Like Jane, and "Up on the Roof" by Gerry Goffin and Carole King, were featured in "Black and Blue". During the final scene, Bolander and Linda perform a movement of "Passacaglia", a classical music song composed by George Frideric Handel.

== Reception ==
=== Ratings ===
While the season premiere episode, "Bop Gun", opened with an extremely high rating due to a guest appearance by Robin Williams, the ratings had declined since then and Tom Fontana said a future decision about whether Homicide would be renewed depended heavily on the ratings performance of "Black and Blue": "I hope the numbers level off now. This Thursday night is do-or-die. It will tell the tale." In its original American broadcast on January 20, 1994, the episode was watched by 10.83 million households, according to Nielsen Media Research, earning the episode an 11.5 rating. That constituted a drop from the previous week's episode, "See No Evil", which was seen by 12.53 million households. Although a drop from the previous episode, "Bop Gun", which drew 16.3 million household viewers and was the 31st highest-rated show of the week. "Black and Blue" was the 47th highest rated show the week it aired, tying with the CBS drama series Picket Fences and the ABC comedy series Thea.

=== Reviews ===
Rarely has a TV series spawned such superb memories. Clear and sharp, they flow together yet persist as separate gems. Among them: Detective Frank Pembleton (Andre Braugher) haranguing a perp into confession just to prove he could do it, in Homicide's season two tale of psychological terror, " Black and Blue".

— Kinney Littlefield,
The Orange County Register

"Black and Blue" received generally positive reviews, with critics particularly praising the performance of Andre Braugher. David P. Kalat, author of Homicide: Life on the Street – The Unofficial Companion, praised the script of "Black and Blue", writing: "Yoshimura has written some of the series' most memorable installments, but the scene of Pembleton extracting a 'confession' from an innocent man is one of his greatest achievements." Kalat also complimented the performance by Margulies, who he said "exhibits the same charm and charisma that made her a star on ER". Kinney Littlefield of the Orange County Register praised Braugher, particularly during the "excruciating" interrogation scene, and wrote, "Unbelievably, 'Black and Blue' didn't earn Braugher an Emmy nomination." Greg Paeth of Scripps Howard News Service called it an "exceptional cop drama" and complimented the dramatic tension between Pembleton and Gee. Chicago Sun-Times writer Lon Grahnke gave the episode four stars and said "Anyone who likes NYPD Blue should give Homicide a try."

Tom Shales of The Washington Post strongly praised both "Black and Blue" and "See No Evil" in part because they showcased Braugher, who he called the finest actor in the ensemble cast. Shales said: "Braugher manages to be utterly compelling whether slamming doors and throwing chairs, reducing a murder suspect to quivering tears, having furious arguments with Lt. Giardello (rock-solid Yaphet Kotto) or simply lurking about." The Baltimore Sun writer David Bianculli called it a superb episode with a "lyrical, beautiful climax", praising Braugher's performance, particularly during the intense interrogation scene with Isaiah Washington. "Black and Blue"" was among a 1999 Court TV marathon of the top 15 Homicide episodes, as voted on by 20,000 visitors to the channel's website.

== Home media ==
"Black and Blue" and the rest of the first and second-season episodes were included in the four-DVD box-set "Homicide: Life on the Street: The Complete Seasons 1 & 2", which was released by A&E Home Video on May 27, 2003, for $69.95.
