= Love Is a Many Splendored Thing =

Love Is a Many Splendored Thing may refer to:

- A Many-Splendoured Thing, a 1952 novel by Han Suyin
- Love Is a Many-Splendored Thing (film), a 1955 film based on the novel starring William Holden and Jennifer Jones
- "Love Is a Many-Splendored Thing" (song), a song written for the film by Sammy Fain and Paul Francis Webster
- Love Is a Many Splendored Thing (TV series), a soap opera based on the film
- "A Many Splendored Thing" (Homicide: Life on the Street), a second-season episode of the television series Homicide: Life on the Street
- A song by the punk rock band AFI on the vinyl version of the album Very Proud of Ya

== See also ==
- "Love Is a Really, Really, Perfectly Okay Thing", an episode of Cheers
- "Love Is a Many Strangled Thing", an episode of The Simpsons from Season 22
- "Love Is a Many-Splintered Thing", an episode of The Simpsons from Season 24
- "A Many Splendored Thing", an episode of NCIS from Season 14
