= A Many Splendored Thing (Homicide: Life on the Street) =

- Homicide: Life on the Street episode
- Bayliss and Pembleton question the owner (Adrienne Shelly) of an S&M fashion store
- Episode no.: Season 2 Episode 4
- Directed by: John McNaughton
- Story by: Tom Fontana
- Teleplay by: Noel Behn
- Cinematography by: Jean de Segonzac
- Production code: 203
- Original air date: January 27, 1994

Guest appearances
- Željko Ivanek as ASA Ed Danvers; Julianna Margulies as Linda; Adrienne Shelly as Tanya Quinn; Ralph Tabakin as Dr. Scheiner

Episode chronology
← Previous "Black and Blue"	Next → "Nearer My God to Thee"
- Homicide: Life on the Street season 2

"A Many Splendored Thing" is the second season finale of the American police drama television series Homicide: Life on the Street, and the thirteenth overall episode of the series. It originally aired on NBC in the United States on January 27, 1994. In the episode, Pembleton and Bayliss investigate the S&M-related murder of a young woman, which forces an uncomfortable Bayliss to confront his darker side. Meanwhile, Lewis is disturbed when a man commits murder over a $1.49 pen, and a despairing Munch crashes Bolander's date and ruins it by venting his own romantic woes.

Written by Noel Behn and directed by John McNaughton, "A Many Splendored Thing" was not originally planned to close the second season, but the expected finale "Bop Gun" was changed to the season premiere to capitalize on a guest performance by Robin Williams. The homicide case in "A Many Splendored Thing" involving a man who committed murder over a pen was based on a similar real-life killing that took place in Anne Arundel County, Maryland. The episode featured the second of two guest appearances by actress Julianna Margulies as Linda, Bolander's romantic interest, as well as an appearance by Adrienne Shelly as the owner of an S&M fashion store.

"A Many Splendored Thing" marked the final appearance by Jon Polito, who had played Detective Steve Crosetti since the series debuted, but was dismissed reportedly because NBC officials were unhappy with his physical appearance. Polito was publicly critical of the show after his dismissal. According to Nielsen Media Research, the episode was seen by 11.2 million household viewers, a slight increase from the previous week's episode, "Black and Blue". It received generally positive reviews, and was identified by The Baltimore Sun as one of the ten best episodes of the series. "A Many Splendored Thing" was nominated for a Writers Guild of America Award for Best Screenplay of an Episodic Drama.

== Plot summary ==
Pembleton (Andre Braugher) and Bayliss (Kyle Secor) investigate the murder of Angela Frandina, who was found strangled in her bed clutching a note reading, "Ed did it", although it proves to be a false lead. Their investigation leads the detectives to discover Angela had several strange boyfriends and worked for both an S&M fashion store and a phone sex hotline. Bayliss claims to be disgusted by sexual taboos, but Pembleton insists everybody has a darker side and that until Bayliss recognizes his own, his virtues can never truly be tested.

Pembleton and Bayliss return to the store and ask about leather belts with bead patterns matching the marks on Angela's neck. Store owner Tanya (Adrienne Shelly) tells them Angela's neighbor Jeremy (Scott Nielson) has a jacket with a matching belt. Under interrogation, Jeremy confesses to choking and accidentally killing Angela with the belt during violent (but consensual) sex. As a thank you for solving the murder, Tanya brings Bayliss a leather jacket as gift, which he reluctantly accepts. That night, he visits Baltimore's red light district wearing the jacket, as a way to test himself as Pembleton suggested. He is approached by a prostitute but rejects her, thus passing the test.

Lewis (Clark Johnson) and Crosetti (Jon Polito) investigate the fatal shooting of a man, who was apparently killed for a $1.49 pen. Lewis believes there must be more to the story, refusing to believe a pen is worth killing for. When they search suspect Mitchell Forman's (Sal S. Koussa) apartment, they find thousands of pens, many of which line the walls like bizarre decorations. Lewis later finds Forman at the police station, where he originally planned to turn himself in, but instead went up to the roof to commit suicide. Lewis lures Forman away from the ledge by enticing him with a beautiful golden pen, which belonged to Lewis' deceased grandmother. Forman is taken into custody. Later, Lewis still cannot believe someone would kill over a pen, but Gee (Yaphet Kotto) suggests it is no worse than killing over a car or woman. Lewis, determined not to develop such a strong attachment to a material item, gives his grandmother's pen to Felton (Daniel Baldwin).

Meanwhile, although Munch (Richard Belzer) is cynical and despairing over his recent breakup, the normally-grumpy Bolander (Ned Beatty) is unusually cheerful due to his romantic relationship with Linda (Julianne Margulies), a much younger 26-year-old waitress. Nervous about his first real date with her, Bolander asks Howard (Melissa Leo) to go on a double-date with him along with Howard's boyfriend, prosecuting attorney Ed Danvers (Željko Ivanek). The double -ate goes well until a lonely Munch crashes, joins the table and ruins the mood by complaining about his romantic woes. Bolander, Munch and Linda leave together and walk to Fort McHenry, where Linda offers Munch words of encouragement. Impressed with her, Munch leaves Linda and Bolander alone, where they happily watch a fireworks show.

== Production ==
"A Many Splendored Thing" was written by Noel Behn and directed by John McNaughton, who previously directed Homicide star Richard Belzer in the film Mad Dog and Glory (1993). Like the other three second season episodes, the script for "A Many Splendored Thing" was already finished by the time the first season ended, but due to poor Nielsen ratings throughout the duration of the show, NBC executives asked for several refinements – including fewer episode subplots and fewer camera movements and jump cuts – before approving a second season. "A Many Splendored Thing" was the second-season finale. The season premiere, "Bop Gun", was originally meant to serve as the finale, but NBC decided to instead open the season with it, with the hopes of getting increased ratings from a guest appearance by actor Robin Williams.

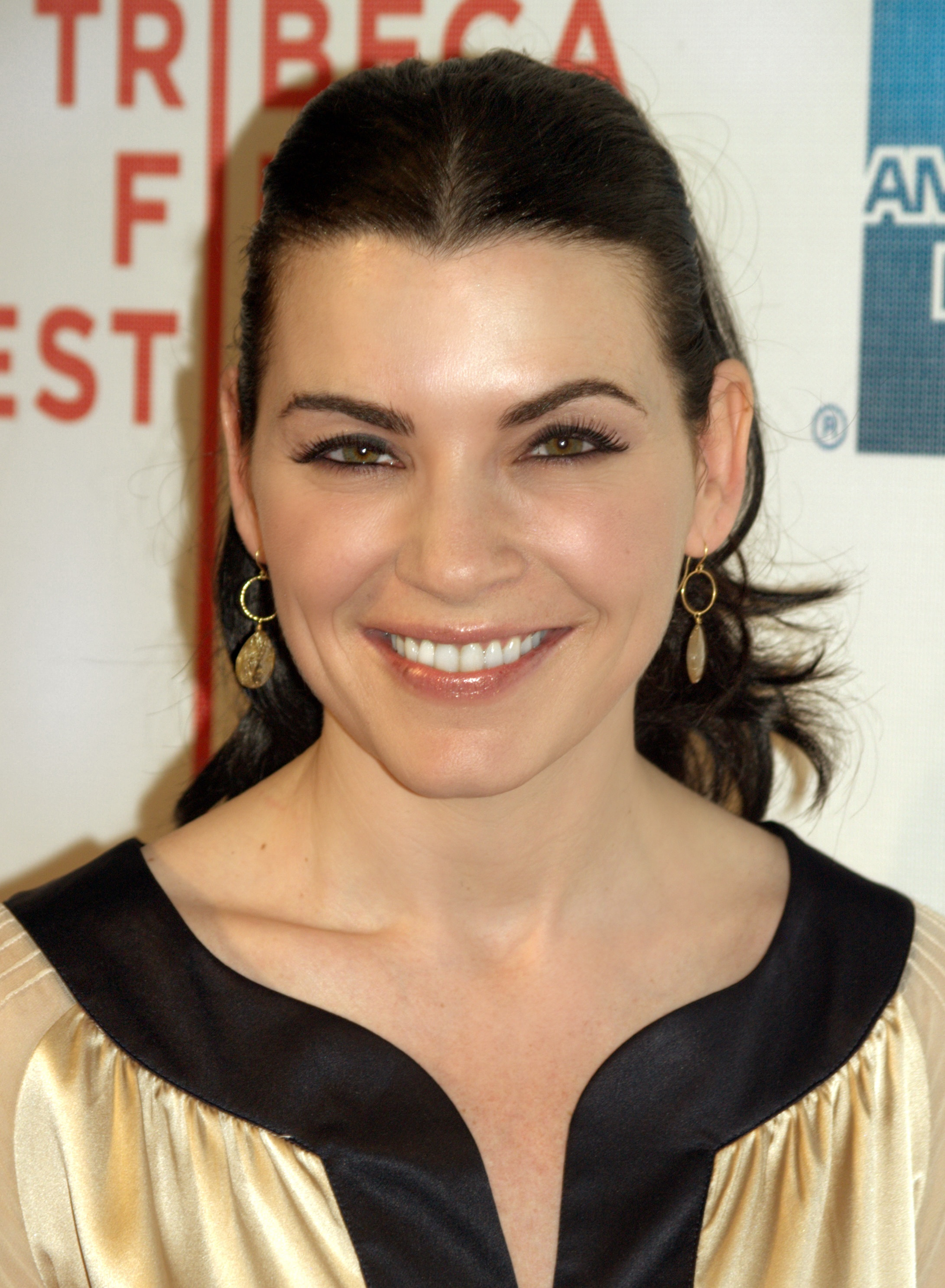
"A Many Splendored Thing" featured the second of two guest performance by Julianna Margulies as the waitress Linda.

The title "A Many Splendored Thing" is a reference to the 1952 historical romance novel A Many-Splendoured Thing and the subsequent film Love Is a Many-Splendored Thing (1955). The title refers to the episode's theme of the many variations of love, as demonstrated by the sexual taboos from the world of Angela Frandina, the dysfunctional relationship of Munch and Felicia, the budding romance between Bolander and Linda, and the twisted love Mitchell Forman harbors for pens. The Forman case was inspired by a real-life murder that took place in Anne Arundel County, Maryland, in which a 23-year-old man shot another man 10 times in a doughnut shop when the victim refused to sell the shooter his pen. During the double date Munch crashes, Howard becomes depressed about the hopelessness of life and love, leaving unhappily with Danvers. This scene foreshadows the eventual break-up of Howard and Danvers, which occurs at an unspecified time in the third season.

The episode marked the final appearance by Jon Polito, who had been a regular cast member since the series debuted, but was dismissed reportedly because NBC officials were unhappy with his weight and physical appearance and did not believe he appealed to audiences. The departure was not amicable, as Polito publicly criticized the direction Homicide had taken in the second season and claimed he voiced concerns about the recent scripts to Fontana and Menaul. "A Many Splendored Thing" featured the second of two guest appearances by actress Julianna Margulies as Linda. A few months later, Margulies started her long-running lead role as nurse Carol Hathaway on the medical drama series ER. She was cast in the part after having worked with Fontana on the unaired pilot of Philly Heat, an ABC miniseries he worked on about members of the Philadelphia Fire Department. Tom Fontana had offered Margulies a recurring role on Homicide, but she turned it down in favor of ER. "A Many Splendored Thing" also featured guest appearances by Adrienne Shelly who played S&M fashion store owner Tanya Quinn, and Sal Koussa as murder suspect Mitchell Forman. Koussa was not a professional actor, and was working as a waiter at Ristorante i Ricchi, a Washington, D.C. favorite, when the episode was filmed.

The songs "Hideaway" and "Out of Time", both of which were written by Bernie McNabb and performed by Scarlet Bride, were featured in "A Many Splendored Thing". Other featured songs include "Whoa" by Soul Asylum, the Donna Summer song "Bad Girls", and a rendition of Italian composer Ottorino Respighi's "Feste Romane", as performed by the Oregon Symphony.

== Reception ==
=== Ratings ===
NBC had renewed Homicide for a second season to assess how the show performed in the Nielsen ratings and make a determination whether to continue the series. The series premiere, "Bop Gun", drew unusually large viewership numbers due to a guest appearance by Robin Williams, but the subsequent episodes had dropped in the ratings, making the viewership of "A Many Splendored Thing" particularly important for the future of the series. Fontana said if the episode performed well, "NBC's going to have to do some hard thinking." In its original American broadcast on January 27, 1994, "A Many Splendored Thing" was watched by 11.2 million households, according to Nielsen Media Research, earning the episode an 11.9 rating. That constituted a slight increase from the previous week's episode, "Black and Blue", which was seen by 10.83 million households. It was the 37th highest rated television show of the week, tied with the Fox animated comedy series The Simpsons. "A Many Splendored Thing" faced unusually tough competition in its timeslot from the ABC news series Primetime Live, which did a special report about convicted murderer Richard Allen Davis.

=== Reviews ===
"A Many Splendored Thing" received generally positive reviews. It was identified by The Baltimore Sun as one of the ten best episodes of the series. Sun writers David Zurawik and Chris Kaltenbach particularly praised the creative pairing of Ned Beatty and Julianna Margulies, of whom they said, "somehow it is as touching a love story as you could want". The Washington Post television reviewer Tom Shales strongly complimented the episode, especially for its serious and unflinching approach to disturbing and twisted events like the Forman murder: "Homicide is more than a superb cop show; it's a helpful guide on dealing with the madness of the modern world. It's Attention Television – a program that grips one's attention and rewards it." The Atlanta Journal-Constitution writer Drew Jubera said the episode "shifts deftly between the underbelly of cop work and the surprising moments of light that leak into these detectives' lives". Greg Paeth of The Cincinnati Post called it "another stunning installment of a cop drama that defines the genre", and particularly praised the "perfect" performance of Ned Beatty. The Baltimore Sun writer David Bianculli called the episode superb and said Adrienne Shelly left a "stunning impression in her performance. Bianculli said it left him "hungry for the next episode," adding, "Personal plea to NBC: Please, please renew this series."

"A Many Splendored Thing" was nominated for a Writers Guild of America Award for Best Screenplay of an Episodic Drama, but ultimately lost to the Homicide episode "Bop Gun".

== Home media ==
"A Many Splendored Thing" and the rest of the first and second-season episodes were included in the four-DVD box-set "Homicide: Life on the Street: The Complete Seasons 1 & 2", which was released by A&E Home Video on May 27, 2003, for $69.95.
