= See No Evil (Homicide: Life on the Street) =

- Homicide: Life on the Street episode
- Chuckie Prentice reluctantly participates in the assisted suicide of his father Harry, who was portrayed by guest star Wilford Brimley
- Episode no.: Season 2 Episode 1
- Directed by: Chris Menaul
- Written by: Paul Attanasio
- Cinematography by: Jean de Segonzac
- Production code: 201
- Original air date: January 13, 1994

Guest appearances
- Wilford Brimley as Harry Prentice; Jennifer Mendenhall as Carry Weston; Michael Chaban as Chuckie Prentice; Clayton LeBouef as Capt. George Barnfather; Gerald F. Gough as Col. Burt Granger

Episode chronology
← Previous "Bop Gun"	Next → "Black and Blue"
- List of Homicide: Life on the Street episodes

"See No Evil" is the first episode of the second season of the American police drama television series Homicide: Life on the Street, and the eleventh overall episode of the series. It originally aired on NBC in the United States on January 13, 1994. In the episode, Felton's friend kills his father in an assisted suicide, and Felton tries to convince Lewis to look the other way. In a subplot, Pembleton investigates what appears to be the police shooting of an unarmed suspect.

The episode was directed by Chris Menaul and written by series creator Paul Attanasio. Wilford Brimley made a guest appearance as Harry Prentice, an ill and bed-ridden man who convinces his son to help him kill himself. Attanasio deliberately wrote the script so it would be morally questionable whether police handling of both the suicide and the police shooting were done in an ethically correct way. Pembleton's investigation was based on a real-life investigation into a suspicious shooting featured in David Simon's non-fiction book Homicide: A Year on the Killing Streets, on which the Homicide series was based.

Detectives from the Baltimore Police Department wrote a letter of formal protest to executive producer Barry Levinson over the negative portrayal of police in the episode. According to Nielsen Media Research, "See No Evil" was seen by 12.53 million household viewers. Although a drop from the previous episode "Bop Gun", it was nevertheless considered a strong rating for Homicide, which NBC was still considering whether to renew. The episode received generally positive reviews.

== Plot ==
Felton (Daniel Baldwin) visits Harry Prentice (Wilford Brimley), the elderly and bed-ridden father of his friend Chuckie (Michael Chaban). Ill and miserable, the hard-bitten Harry has decided he wants to die and has hired a suicide doctor. Felton believes this is wrong and convinces Chuckie to call it off, much to Harry's anger. A few days later, however, Harry wears Chuckie down and convinces his son to shoot him with a handgun. When Lewis (Clark Johnson) and Crosetti (Jon Polito) investigate, Chuckie claims Harry shot himself, which Lewis does not believe. Felton talks to Chuckie at the police station and Chuckie admits to the assisted suicide, but Felton tells him to stick to the original suicide story. Lewis realizes what happened and confronts Felton, who admits what Chuckie did and suggests it was the right thing to do, but Lewis adamantly disagrees. Since the bullet evidence is inconclusive, Felton asks Lewis to let Chuckie secretly wash his hands so no gunpowder residue will be found in tests. Lewis eventually agrees, allowing Chuckie to get away with the shooting.

Meanwhile, the homicide unit is requiring all the detectives to take sensitivity training with therapist Carry Westin (Jennifer Mendenhall). While most of the detectives have positive experiences with her, Bolander (Ned Beatty) flatly refuses to participate and repeatedly avoids their scheduled sessions. When Gee (Yaphet Kotto) tells Bolander he will be suspended without pay if he does not meet with her, Bolander chooses the suspension, but later reconsiders after his partner Munch (Richard Belzer) harasses him at the bar until he changes his mind. When they finally meet, Bolander explains he does not trust therapists because when going through marriage counseling with his ex-wife, the therapist actively encouraged her to leave Bolander. He feels he was cheated out of $7,000 in therapy bills, but Westin explains his anger is not from the money, but from feelings of betrayal by his ex-wife. Bolander is ultimately impressed by Westin and even decides to ask her on a date, but she strongly hints she is a lesbian.

Pembleton (Andre Braugher) and Bayliss (Kyle Secor) are called to investigate the shooting death of Charles Courtland Cox, a small-time drug peddler shot in the back after a police raid of a crack house. When Pembleton suspects a police shooting, Lieutenant Jimmy Tyron (Michael S. Kennedy) explains Officer Hellriegel (Jeffrey Mandon) accidentally shot Cox after falling down and discharging his weapon. However, Hellriegel does not recall details and appears nervous by questioning from Pembleton. Gee is angry with Pembleton's inquiries into the police and becomes even angrier when Colonel Granger (Gerald F. Gough) and Captain Barnfather (Clayton LeBouef) say they will make Hellriegel a scapegoat if the media start suggesting racism or police brutality. Hellriegel is cleared when tests reveal the bullet does not match his gun, but Pembleton requests the firearms of the other officers be tested. Gee refuses to approve the tests, but Pembleton gets Barnfather to order them.

== Production ==
"See No Evil" was directed by Chris Menaul and written by series creator Paul Attanasio, who had not penned a Homicide script since series premiere "Gone for Goode". The episode was originally meant to be the second season premiere, but NBC decided to air "Bop Gun" first because it featured a guest appearance by Robin Williams, which the network hoped would lead to increased Nielsen ratings. Like the other three second season episodes, the script for "See No Evil" was already finished by the time the first season ended, but due to poor ratings throughout the duration of the show, NBC executives asked for several refinements – including fewer episode subplots and fewer camera movements and jump cuts – before approving a second season. Attanasio deliberately wrote the "See No Evil" script so that it would be morally questionable whether the police handling of both main subplots — the assisted suicide and the suspected police shooting — were handled in an ethically correct way. Ultimately, Attanasio wanted it to be up to the audience to interpret for themselves.

Pembleton's investigation of fellow police officers for a suspicious shooting was based on a real-life investigation chronicled in David Simon's 1991 non-fiction book Homicide: A Year on the Killing Streets, from which the Homicide series was adapted. Baltimore Police Department Detective Donald Worden, on whom the Bolander character is based, handled the actual real-life investigation in 1988. Lewis' agreement to help Felton would later be referenced in the third season episode "Crosetti", when Lewis reminded Felton of the favor while seeking help in stopping Bolander's investigation into the death of Crosetti. Several members of the Baltimore Police Department publicly criticized Homicide for its negative portrayal of the police in the episode, and 22 detectives wrote a formal letter of protest to executive producer Barry Levinson over the matter.

"See No Evil" featured a guest performance by Wilford Brimley as the bed-ridden and suicidal Harry Prentice, as well as Michael Chaban as his son Chuckie Prentice and Jennifer Mendenhall as sensitivity training therapist Carry Westin. The Harry Prentice story line includes his service aboard the SS John W. Brown, with the final scene of the episode filmed in front of that Liberty ship in Baltimore harbor. Mendenhall, predominately a stage actress, was a regular performer with the Woolly Mammoth Theatre Company in Washington, D.C. at the time she appeared in this episode. Michael S. Kennedy, an actor from Richmond, Texas, played Lt. Jimmy Tyron, a part he would reprise in the subsequent episode, "Black and Blue". A struggling actor, Kennedy received a call in the middle of an all-night shoot in Virginia Beach from a casting director he knew, informing him about the audition for Homicide one day in advance. He so enjoyed working on the show that he wrote a Homicide script himself, with Tyron playing a major part in the story, although it was ultimately never used. The songs "Rhythm and Blues" by Benjamin Antin, and "Barkeep" by Lee Currerri", were featured in "See No Evil".

== Reception ==
=== Ratings ===
In its original American broadcast on January 13, 1994, the episode was watched by 12.53 million households, according to Nielsen Media Research, earning the episode a 13.3 rating. It was a drop from the previous episode, "Bop Gun", which drew 16.3 million household viewers, and Homicide dropped from the 10th highest-rated show of the week to the 31st highest-rated. But the ratings dip was expected due to the absence of Robin Williams and the "See No Evil" rating was nevertheless considered a strong one for the show, better than past Homicide episodes and the average rating for L.A. Law, the legal drama which previously occupied that NBC timeslot. "See No Evil" was outperformed in its timeslot by the ABC news series Primetime Live, which was the 11th highest-rated show of the week. Fontana said of the rating, "I hope the numbers level off now. This Thursday night is do-or-die. It will tell the tale," referring to the subsequent week's episode, "Black and Blue".

=== Reviews ===
"See No Evil" received generally positive reviews. David Bianculli of The Baltimore Sun said he was surprised and impressed that the writers placed their characters in ethical dilemmas that led them to making illegal decisions. He added of the series, "Please watch this series; it's so good, I don't mind pleading." Matt Roush of USA Today called it a powerful episode and praised Andre Braugher's "terrific" performance. Gannett News Service writer Tim Kiska praised the episode and called Yaphet Kotto's performance a "tour-de-force". The Miami Herald television critic Hal Boedeker called "See No Evil" equally as strong as "Bop Gun", of which he was also extremely complimentary. Tom Shales of The Washington Post said both "See No Evil" and "Black and Blue" were better than the critically acclaimed "Bop Gun", in part because they showcased Andre Braugher, who he called the finest actor in the ensemble cast: "Braugher manages to be utterly compelling whether slamming doors and throwing chairs, reducing a murder suspect to quivering tears, having furious arguments with Lt. Giardello (rock-solid Yaphet Kotto) or simply lurking about."

== Home media ==
"See No Evil" and the rest of the first and second season episodes were included in the four-DVD box-set "Homicide: Life on the Street: The Complete Seasons 1 & 2", which was released by A&E Home Video on May 27, 2003 for $69.95.
