= Writers Guild of America Award for Television: Episodic Drama =

Annual award by the Writers Guild of America

- Awarded for: Outstanding Writing for a Drama Series
- Country: United States
- Presented by: Writers Guild of America
- First award: 1961
- Currently held by: R. Scott Gemmill; The Pitt (2025)
- Website: https://www.wga.org/

The Writers Guild of America Award for Television: Episodic Drama is an award presented by the Writers Guild of America to the best written episodes of a dramatic television series. It has been presented annually since the 14th annual Writers Guild of America awards in 1962. The years denote when each episode first aired. Though, due to the eligibility period, some nominees could have aired in a different year. The current eligibility period is December 1 to November 30. The winners are highlighted in gold.

== Winners and nominees ==
=== 1960s ===
Year	Series	Episode	Winners/nominees	Network
Episodic, Longer Than 30 Minutes in Length
1960 (13th)
1960 (13th)	The Untouchables	"The Unhired Assassin"	William Spier	ABC
1960 (13th)	Bonanza	"The Last Hunt"	Donald S. Sanford	NBC
1960 (13th)	Rawhide	"Incident of the Dry Drive"	John Dunkel	CBS
Episodic Drama
1961 (14th)
1961 (14th)	Naked City	"The Fault in Our Stars"	Barry Trivers	ABC
1961 (14th)	Have Gun – Will Travel	"The Fatalist"	Shimon Wincelberg	CBS
1961 (14th)	The Law and Mr. Jones	"No Sale"	Palmer Thompson	ABC
1961 (14th)	Rawhide	"The Incident of the Buffalo Soldier"	John Dunkel	CBS
1961 (14th)	The Westerner	"Brown"	Bruce Geller	NBC
1962 (15th)
1962 (15th)	Naked City	"Today the Man Who Kills the Ants Is Coming"	Story by : Kenneth M. Rosen; Teleplay by : Howard Rodman and Kenneth M. Rosen	ABC
1962 (15th)	Ben Casey	"I Remember a Lemon Tree"	Story by : Marcus W. Demian; Teleplay by : Jack Laird	ABC
1962 (15th)	The Defenders	"The Benefactor"	Peter Stone	CBS
1962 (15th)	Naked City	"The Multiplicity of Herbert Konish"	Ernest Kinoy	ABC
1962 (15th)	Route 66	"Goodnight, Sweet Blues"	Story by : Leonard Freeman and Will Lorin; Teleplay by : Will Lorin	CBS
1963 (16th)
1963 (16th)	Route 66	"Man Out of Time"	Lawrence B. Marcus	CBS
1963 (16th)	Ben Casey	"A Cardinal Act of Mercy"	Norman Katkov	ABC
1963 (16th)	The Defenders	"A Book for Burning"	William Woolfolk	CBS
1963 (16th)	Empire	"Between Friday and Monday"	Kenneth Trevey	NBC
1963 (16th)	Naked City	"The S.S. American Dream"	Frank Pierson	ABC
1964 (17th)
1964 (17th)	East Side/West Side	"Who Do You Kill?"	Arnold Perl	CBS
1964 (17th)	Channing	"Freedom is a Lovesome Thing God Wot!"	Jack R. Guss and Edmund Morris	ABC
1964 (17th)	Channing	"Wave Goodbye to Our Fair-Haired Boy"	Kenneth Kolb	ABC
1964 (17th)	The Defenders	"The Non Violent"	Ernest Kinoy	CBS
1964 (17th)	Gunsmoke	"Owney Tupper Had A Daughter"	Paul Savage	CBS
1965 (18th)
1965 (18th)	Mr. Novak	"With a Hammer In His Hand, Lord, Lord!"	John D. F. Black	NBC
1965 (18th)	12 O'Clock High	"Interlude"	Dean Riesner	ABC
1965 (18th)	Ben Casey	"A Woods Full of Question Marks"	Ellis Marcus	ABC
1965 (18th)	Dr. Kildare	"Man is a Rock"	Christopher Knopf	NBC
1965 (18th)	The Fugitive	"Men in a Chariot"	George Eckstein	ABC
1965 (18th)	Slattery's People	"Did He Who Made the Lamb Make Thee?"	William P. McGivern	CBS
1966 (19th)
1966 (19th)	The Trials of O'Brien	"No Justice for the Judge"	David Ellis	CBS
1966 (19th)	Court Martial	"Judge Them Gently"	Gerry Day	ABC
1966 (19th)	The Fugitive	"When the Wind Blows"	Betty Langdon	ABC
1966 (19th)	Slattery's People	"Color Him Red"	Pat Fielder	CBS
1966 (19th)	The Virginian	"The Horse Fighter"	Richard Fielder	NBC
1967 (20th)
1967 (20th)	Star Trek	"The City on the Edge of Forever"	Harlan Ellison	NBC
1967 (20th)	The Big Valley	"The Martyr"	Mel Goldberg	ABC
1967 (20th)	Gunsmoke	"Fandango"	Don Ingalls	CBS
1967 (20th)	Mission: Impossible	"Odds on Evil"	William Read Woodfield & Allan Balter	CBS
1967 (20th)	Star Trek	"The Return of the Archons"	Story by : Gene Roddenberry; Teleplay by : Boris Sobelman	NBC
1968 (21st)
1968 (21st)	Judd, for the Defense	"To Kill a Madman"	Robert Lewin	ABC
1968 (21st)	Hawaii Five-O	"Pilot"	Leonard Freeman	CBS
1968 (21st)	Judd, for the Defense	"The Commitment"	Paul Monash	ABC
1968 (21st)	Judd, for the Defense	"No Law Against Murder"	Harold Gast	ABC
1968 (21st)	Mannix	"The Name is Mannix"	Bruce Geller	CBS
1968 (21st)	The Outcasts	"Take Your Lover in the Ring"	Anthony Lawrence	ABC
1968 (21st)	Star Trek	"Return to Tomorrow"	John T. Dugan	NBC
1969 (22nd)
1969 (22nd)	Judd, for the Defense	"An Elephant in a Cigar Box"	Robert Lewin	ABC
1969 (22nd)	Hawaii Five-O	"To Hell with Babe Ruth"	Anthony Lawrence	CBS
1969 (22nd)	The Mod Squad	"In This Corner -- Sol Alpert"	Rita Lakin and Harve Bennett	ABC
1969 (22nd)	The Mod Squad	"Keep the Faith, Baby"	Harve Bennett	ABC
1969 (22nd)	Then Came Bronson	"Two Percent of Nothing"	D. C. Fontana	NBC
1969 (22nd)	The Virginian	"Black Jade"	Herb Meadow	NBC

=== 1970s ===
Year	Series	Episode	Winners/nominees	Network
1970 (23rd)
1970 (23rd)	The Bold Ones: The Senator	"A Continual Roar of Musketry"	David W. Rintels	NBC
1970 (23rd)	Bracken's World	"Infinity"	Cliff Gould	NBC
1970 (23rd)	Bracken's World	"Meanwhile, Back at the Studio"	Joseph Bonaduce	NBC
1970 (23rd)	Hawaii Five-O	"Trouble in Mind"	Mel Goldberg and Sasha Gilien	CBS
1970 (23rd)	The Young Lawyers	"The Glass Prison"	John W. Bloch	ABC
1971 (24th)
1971 (24th)	The Psychiatrist	"Par for the Course"	Story by : Thomas Y. Drake; Teleplay by : Herb Bermann, Thomas Y. Drake, Jerrold Freedman and Bo May	NBC
1971 (24th)	The Bold Ones: The Lawyers	"The Invasion of Kevin Ireland"	Story by : Bret Huggins; Teleplay by : Jack B. Sowards	NBC
1971 (24th)	The Bold Ones: The New Doctors	"Angry Man"	Arthur Dales	NBC
1971 (24th)	Columbo	"Murder by the Book"	Steven Bochco	NBC
1971 (24th)	Hawaii Five-O	"F.O.B. Honolulu"	Jerry Ludwig & Eric Bercovici	CBS
1971 (24th)	Ironside	"No Motive for Murder"	Sy Salkowitz	NBC
1971 (24th)	Marcus Welby, M.D.	"They Grow Up"	Dick Nelson	ABC
1971 (24th)	Owen Marshall: Counselor at Law	"Until Proven Innocent"	Pat Fielder	ABC
1972 (25th)
1972 (25th)	Kung Fu	"King of the Mountain"	Herman Miller	ABC
1972 (25th)	Columbo	"Etude in Black"	Story by : Richard Levinson & William Link; Teleplay by : Steven Bochco	NBC
1972 (25th)	Marcus Welby, M.D.	"Please Don't Send Flowers"	Bess Boyle	ABC
1972 (25th)	McCloud	"The Barefoot Stewardess Caper"	Story by : B. W. Sandefur; Teleplay by : Michael Gleason and Glen A. Larson	NBC
1972 (25th)	McCloud	"The New Mexican Connection"	Glen A. Larson	NBC
1972 (25th)	The Mod Squad	"Taps, Play It Louder"	Sandor Stern	ABC
1973 (26th)
1973 (26th)	The Starlost	"Phoenix without Ashes"	Harlan Ellison	Syndicated
1973 (26th)	Gunsmoke	"The Golden Land"	Hal Sitowitz	CBS
1973 (26th)	Marcus Welby, M.D.	"A Necessary End"	Norman Hudis	ABC
1973 (26th)	The Streets of San Francisco	"House on Hyde Street"	Story by : Cliff Osmond; Teleplay by : John Wilder	ABC
1973 (26th)	The Waltons	"The Easter Story"	Story by : Earl Hamner; Teleplay by : John McGreevey	CBS
1973 (26th)	The Waltons	"The Odyssey"	Joanna Lee	CBS
1973 (26th)	The Waltons	"The Roots"	Sheldon Stark	CBS
1973 (26th)	The Waltons	"The Thanksgiving Story"	Story by : Earl Hamner; Teleplay by : Joanna Lee	CBS
1974 (27th)
1974 (27th)	Gunsmoke	"Thirty a Month and Found"	Jim Byrnes	CBS
1974 (27th)	McCloud	"The Colorado Cattle Caper"	Michael Gleason	NBC
1974 (27th)	The New Land	"The Word Is: Growth"	William Blinn	ABC
1974 (27th)	The Waltons	"The Conflict"	Jeb Rosebrook	CBS
1975 (28th)
1975 (28th)	The Law	"Prior Consent"	Story by : Stephen Kandel; Teleplay by : Arthur A. Ross	NBC
1975 (28th)	Gunsmoke	"The Busters"	Jim Byrnes	CBS
1975 (28th)	Kojak	"The Good Luck Bomber"	Raymond Brenner	CBS
1975 (28th)	The Streets of San Francisco	"Web of Lies"	Leonard Kantor	ABC
1975 (28th)	The Waltons	"The Woman"	Hindi Brooks	CBS
1976 (29th)
1976 (29th)	Sandburg's Lincoln	"Crossing Fox River"	Loring Mandel	NBC
1976 (29th)	Baa Baa Black Sheep	"Flying Misfits"	Stephen J. Cannell	NBC
1976 (29th)	City of Angels	"The November Plan"	Story by : Roy Huggins and Stephen J. Cannell; Teleplay by : Stephen J. Cannell	NBC
1976 (29th)	Rich Man, Poor Man Book II	"Chapter I"	Millard Lampell	ABC
1976 (29th)	The Rockford Files	"So Help Me God"	Juanita Bartlett	NBC
1977 (30th)
1977 (30th)	Police Story	"Pressure Point"	Mark Rodgers	NBC
1977 (30th)	Eight Is Enough	"The Gipper Caper"	William Blinn	ABC
1977 (30th)	Lou Grant	"Christmas"	David Lloyd	CBS
1977 (30th)	Lou Grant	"Housewarming"	Leonora Thuna	CBS
1977 (30th)	Police Woman	"Merry Christmas, Waldo"	E. Arthur Kean	NBC
1977 (30th)	The Rockford Files	"Beamer's Last Case"	Story by : Booker Bradshaw & Calvin Kelly; Teleplay by : Stephen J. Cannell	NBC
1977 (30th)	The Rockford Files	"Quickie Nirvana"	David Chase	NBC
1978 (31st)
1978 (31st)	Lou Grant	"Prisoner"	Seth Freeman	CBS
1978 (31st)	Columbo	"The Conspirators"	Howard Berk	NBC
1978 (31st)	Lou Grant	"Murder"	Gary David Goldberg	CBS
1978 (31st)	The Rockford Files	"The House on Willis Avenue"	Stephen J. Cannell	NBC
1978 (31st)	The Waltons	"The Captive"	Ray Cunneff	CBS
1978 (31st)	The Waltons	"The Illusion"	John McGreevey	CBS
1979 (32nd)
1979 (32nd)	Lou Grant	"Vet"	Leon Tokatyan	CBS
1979 (32nd)	Eischied	"The Demon"	Mark Rodgers	NBC
1979 (32nd)	Lou Grant	"Exposé"	David Lloyd	CBS
1979 (32nd)	Lou Grant	"Home"	Gary David Goldberg	CBS
1979 (32nd)	Lou Grant	"Slammer"	Johnny Dawkins	CBS
1979 (32nd)	The Rockford Files	"Some Things You Can Tell Yourself"	David Chase	NBC
1979 (32nd)	The Waltons	"The Burden"	E. F. Wallengren	CBS

=== 1980s ===
Year	Series	Episode	Winners/nominees	Network
1980 (33rd)
1980 (33rd)	Tenspeed and Brown Shoe	"Pilot"	Stephen J. Cannell	ABC
1980 (33rd)	Little House on the Prairie	"Second Spring"	John T. Dugan	NBC
1980 (33rd)	Lou Grant	"Blackout"	Steve Kline	CBS
1980 (33rd)	Lou Grant	"Brushfire"	Allan Burns and Gene Reynolds	CBS
1980 (33rd)	Lou Grant	"Inheritance"	April Smith	CBS
1980 (33rd)	M*A*S*H	"Dreams"	Story by : Alan Alda and James Ray Rubinfier; Teleplay by : Alan Alda	CBS
1980 (33rd)	Skag	"Pilot"	Abby Mann	NBC
1981 (34th)
1981 (34th)	Hill Street Blues	"Hill Street Station"	Michael Kozoll and Steven Bochco	NBC
1981 (34th)	Hill Street Blues	"Film at Eleven"	Anthony Yerkovich	NBC
1981 (34th)	Lou Grant	"Campesinos"	Michael Vittes	CBS
1981 (34th)	Lou Grant	"Strike"	April Smith	CBS
1981 (34th)	M*A*S*H	"Bless You, Hawkeye"	Dan Wilcox & Thad Mumford	CBS
1981 (34th)	Palmerstown, USA	"Future City"	Ronald Rubin	CBS
1982 (35th)
1982 (35th)	Hill Street Blues	"The World According to Freedom"	Michael Wagner	NBC
1982 (35th)	Darkroom	"Closed Circuit"	Alan Brennert	ABC
1982 (35th)	Fame	"A Special Place"	Parke Perine	NBC
1982 (35th)	Hill Street Blues	"Fruits of the Poisonous Tree"	Jeffrey Lewis	NBC
1982 (35th)	Lou Grant	"Review"	Jeffrey Lane	CBS
1983 (36th)
1983 (36th)	Hill Street Blues	"Trial by Fury"	David Milch	NBC
1983 (36th)	Cagney & Lacey	"Jane Doe #37"	Peter Lefcourt	CBS
1983 (36th)	Hill Street Blues	"Eugene's Comedy Empire Strikes Back"	Story by : Steven Bochco, Anthony Yerkovich and Jeffrey Lewis; Teleplay by : Anthony Yerkovich, David Milch and Karen Hall	NBC
1983 (36th)	Hill Street Blues	"Gung Ho!"	David Milch, Jeffrey Lewis and Michael Wagner	NBC
1983 (36th)	St. Elsewhere	"Addiction"	John Masius and Tom Fontana	NBC
1983 (36th)	Two Marriages	"Pilot"	Carol Sobieski	ABC
1984 (37th)
1984 (37th)	Hill Street Blues	"Grace Under Pressure"	Story by : Steven Bochco, Jeffrey Lewis and David Milch; Teleplay by : Jeffrey Lewis, Michael Wagner, Karen Hall and Mark Frost	NBC
1984 (37th)	Cagney & Lacey	"Victimless Crime"	Peter Lefcourt	CBS
1984 (37th)	Hill Street Blues	"Death by Kiki"	David Milch and Mark Frost	NBC
1984 (37th)	Hill Street Blues	"Parting is Such Sweep Sorrow"	Story by : Steven Bochco, Jeffrey Lewis and David Milch; Teleplay by : Jeffrey Lewis, Michael Wagner, David Milch and Mark Frost	NBC
1984 (37th)	St. Elsewhere	"Hello and Goodbye"	John Masius and Tom Fontana	NBC
1984 (37th)	St. Elsewhere	"The Women"	Story by : John Masius and Tom Fontana; Teleplay by : John Ford Noonan	NBC
1984 (37th)	Trauma Center	"Turnaround"	Harry Longstreet & Renee Schonfeld Longstreet	ABC
1985 (38th)
1985 (38th)	Cagney & Lacey	"An Unusual Occurrence"	Georgia Jeffries	CBS
1985 (38th)	Miami Vice	"Brother's Keeper"	Anthony Yerkovich	NBC
1985 (38th)	Cagney & Lacey	"Child Witness"	Deborah Arakelian	CBS
1985 (38th)	Cagney & Lacey	"Who Said It's Fair?" (Part II)	Patricia Green	CBS
1985 (38th)	Call to Glory	"A Wind from the East"	Josef Anderson	ABC
1985 (38th)	Hill Street Blues	"Watt a Way to Go"	Story by : Steven Bochco, Jeffrey Lewis and David Milch; Teleplay by : David Milch and Roger Director	NBC
1985 (38th)	St. Elsewhere	"Sweet Dreams"	John Masius and Tom Fontana	NBC
1986 (39th)
1986 (39th)	Moonlighting	"The Dream Sequence Always Rings Twice"	Debra Frank and Carl Sautter	ABC
1986 (39th)	St. Elsewhere	"Remembrance of Things Past"	John Masius, Bruce Paltrow and Tom Fontana	NBC
1986 (39th)	Hill Street Blues	"Remembrance of Hits Past"	Story by : Jeffrey Lewis, David Milch and Walon Green; Teleplay by : Walon Green	NBC
1986 (39th)	Hill Street Blues	"What Are Friends For?"	Dick Wolf	NBC
1986 (39th)	Moonlighting	"Every Daughter's Father is a Virgin"	Bruce Franklin Singer	ABC
1987 (40th)
1987 (40th)	Cagney & Lacey	"Turn, Turn, Turn: Part 1"	Georgia Jeffries	CBS
1987 (40th)	Moonlighting	"It's a Wonderful Job"	Debra Frank and Carl Sautter	ABC
1987 (40th)	Hill Street Blues	"Fathers and Guns"	Story by : Jeffrey Lewis and Jerry Patrick Brown; Teleplay by : Jeffrey Lewis	NBC
1987 (40th)	Hill Street Blues	"More Skinned Against than Skinning"	David Black	NBC
1987 (40th)	L.A. Law	"Fry Me to the Moon"	Jacob Epstein, Marshall Goldberg and David E. Kelley	NBC
1987 (40th)	L.A. Law	"The Venus Butterfly"	Steven Bochco and Terry Louise Fisher	NBC
1987 (40th)	Moonlighting	"Atomic Shakespeare"	Jeff Reno & Ron Osborn	ABC
1987 (40th)	Moonlighting	"Big Man on Mulberry Street"	Karen Hall	ABC
1987 (40th)	St. Elsewhere	"A Room with a View"	Story by : John Masius, Tom Fontana and Channing Gibson; Teleplay by : Channing Gibson	NBC
1988 (41st)
1988 (41st)	thirtysomething	"Pilot"	Marshall Herskovitz & Edward Zwick	ABC
1988 (41st)	thirtysomething	"Therapy"	Susan Shilliday	ABC
1988 (41st)	China Beach	"Home"	William Broyles Jr.	ABC
1988 (41st)	L.A. Law	"Full Marital Jacket"	Story by : Steven Bochco and Terry Louise Fisher; Teleplay by : Terry Louise Fisher and David E. Kelley	NBC
1988 (41st)	St. Elsewhere	"A Moon for the Misbegotten"	Story by : Tom Fontana, John Tinker and Channing Gibson; Teleplay by : Tom Fontana	NBC
1988 (41st)	thirtysomething	"Nice Work If You Can Get It"	Story by : Jean Vallely; Teleplay by : Paul Haggis	ABC
1989 (42nd)
1989 (42nd)	TV 101	"Rolling"	Karl Schaefer	CBS
1989 (42nd)	CBS Summer Playhouse	"Elysian Fields"	Joan Tewkesbury	CBS
1989 (42nd)	China Beach	"Where the Boys Are"	Alan Brennert	ABC
1989 (42nd)	China Beach	"Xmas/CHNBCH VN '67"	John Wells	ABC
1989 (42nd)	L.A. Law	"His Suite is Hirsute"	Steven Bochco, David E. Kelley, Michele Gallery and William M. Finkelstein	NBC
1989 (42nd)	Star Trek: The Next Generation	"The Measure of a Man"	Melinda M. Snodgrass	Syndicated

=== 1990s ===
Year	Series	Episode	Winners/nominees	Network
1990 (43rd)
1990 (43rd)	China Beach	"Souvenirs"	John Sacret Young	ABC
1990 (43rd)	China Beach	"Warriors"	Story by : Martin M. Goldstein and Neal Baer; Teleplay by : Dottie Dartland	ABC
1990 (43rd)	L.A. Law	"Bang...Zoom...Zap"	David E. Kelley and William M. Finkelstein	NBC
1990 (43rd)	L.A. Law	"Justice Swerved"	David E. Kelley and Bryce Zabel	NBC
1990 (43rd)	thirtysomething	"I'm Nobody! Who Are You?"	Winnie Holzman	ABC
1990 (43rd)	thirtysomething	"Strangers"	Richard Kramer	ABC
1991 (44th)
1991 (44th)	thirtysomething	"Photo Opportunity"	Racelle Rosett Schaefer	ABC
1991 (44th)	China Beach	"Escape"	Story by : John Sacret Young, John Wells, Carol Flint and Lydia Woodward; Teleplay by : Paris Qualles	ABC
1991 (44th)	China Beach	"Hello Goodbye"	Story by : John Sacret Young, John Wells, Carol Flint and Lydia Woodward; Teleplay by : John Wells	ABC
1991 (44th)	Law & Order	"Everybody's Favorite Bagman"	Dick Wolf	NBC
1991 (44th)	Quantum Leap	"The Leap Home, Part 1"	Donald P. Bellisario	NBC
1991 (44th)	thirtysomething	"Guns and Roses"	Liberty Godshall	ABC
1992 (45th)
1992 (45th)	I'll Fly Away	"Amazing Grace"	Henry Bromell	NBC
1992 (45th)	I'll Fly Away	"Coming Home"	Kevin Arkadie	NBC
1992 (45th)	Northern Exposure	"Burning Down the House"	Robin Green	CBS
1992 (45th)	Northern Exposure	"Seoul Mates"	Diane Frolov and Andrew Schneider	CBS
1993 (46th)
1993 (46th)	Homicide: Life on the Street	"Night of the Dead Living"	Story by : Tom Fontana and Frank Pugliese; Teleplay by : Frank Pugliese	NBC
1993 (46th)	Homicide: Life on the Street	"Gone for Goode"	Paul Attanasio	NBC
1993 (46th)	I'll Fly Away	"Comfort and Joy"	Barbara Hall	NBC
1993 (46th)	Life Goes On	"Last Wish"	Toni Graphia	ABC
1993 (46th)	Picket Fences	"Thanksgiving"	David E. Kelley	CBS
1993 (46th)	Reasonable Doubts	"Thank God It's Friday"	Ed Zuckerman	NBC
1993 (46th)	TriBeCa	"The Box"	David J. Burke and Hans Tobeason	Fox
1994 (47th)
1994 (47th)	Homicide: Life on the Street	"Bop Gun"	Story by : Tom Fontana; Teleplay by : David Simon and David Mills	NBC
1994 (47th)	Homicide: Life on the Street	"A Many Splendored Thing"	Story by : Tom Fontana; Teleplay by : Noel Behn	NBC
1994 (47th)	Northern Exposure	"Hello, I Love You"	Robin Green and Mitchell Burgess	CBS
1994 (47th)	NYPD Blue	"Pilot"	Story by : Steven Bochco and David Milch; Teleplay by : David Milch	ABC
1994 (47th)	NYPD Blue	"Tempest in a C-Cup"	Gardner Stern	ABC
1995 (48th)
1995 (48th)	ER	"Love's Labor Lost"	Lance A. Gentile	NBC
1995 (48th)	Homicide: Life on the Street	"Fits Like a Glove"	Story by : Tom Fontana and Julie Martin; Teleplay by : Bonnie Mark	NBC
1995 (48th)	Picket Fences	"Saint Zack"	Story by : Nick Harding; Teleplay by : Nick Harding and David E. Kelley	CBS
1995 (48th)	The X-Files	"Duane Barry"	Chris Carter	Fox
1996 (49th)
1996 (49th)	NYPD Blue	"Girl Talk"	Story by : Bill Clark and Theresa Rebeck; Teleplay by : Theresa Rebeck	ABC
1996 (49th)	Law & Order	"Aftershock"	Story by : Michael S. Chernuchin and Janis Diamond; Teleplay by : Janis Diamond	NBC
1996 (49th)	Law & Order	"Savages"	Morgan Gendel, Barry M. Schkolnick and Michael S. Chernuchin	NBC
1996 (49th)	Law & Order	"Trophy"	Story by : Jeremy R. Littman and Ed Zuckerman; Teleplay by : Jeremy R. Littman	NBC
1996 (49th)	Murder One	"Chapter One"	Story by : Steven Bochco, Charles H. Eglee and Channing Gibson; Teleplay by : Charles H. Eglee, Channing Gibson, Steven Bochco and David Milch	ABC
1996 (49th)	Party of Five	"Falsies"	Mark B. Perry	Fox
1996 (49th)	The X-Files	"Clyde Bruckman's Final Repose"	Darin Morgan	Fox
1997 (50th)
1997 (50th)	Law & Order	"Entrapment"	Rene Balcer and Richard Sweren	NBC
1997 (50th)	ER	"Who's Appy Now?"	Neal Baer	NBC
1997 (50th)	Law & Order	"Deadbeat"	Ed Zuckerman and I.C. Rapoport	NBC
1998 (51st)
1998 (51st)	Nothing Sacred	"Proofs for the Existence of God"	Paul Leland	ABC
1998 (51st)	ER	"Exodus"	Walon Green and Joe Sachs	NBC
1998 (51st)	From the Earth to the Moon	"Apollo One"	Graham Yost	HBO
1998 (51st)	Homicide: Life on the Street	"Finnegan's Wake"	Story by : James Yoshimura and David Simon; Teleplay by : David Mills	NBC
1998 (51st)	Homicide: Life on the Street	"Saigon Rose"	Eric Overmyer	NBC
1998 (51st)	Homicide: Life on the Street	"Subway"	James Yoshimura	NBC
1998 (51st)	Law & Order	"Burned"	Siobhan Byrne	NBC
1998 (51st)	The Practice	"Betrayal"	David E. Kelley	ABC
1998 (51st)	Rescuers: Stories of Courage	"The Marie Taquet Story"	Story by : Cy Chermak, Francine Carroll and Malka Drucker; Teleplay by : Cy Chermak and Francine Carroll	Showtime
1999 (52nd)
1999 (52nd)	The Sopranos	"Meadowlands"	Jason Cahill	HBO
1999 (52nd)	ER	"The Storm, Part 1"	John Wells	NBC
1999 (52nd)	Law & Order	"DWB"	Rene Balcer	NBC
1999 (52nd)	Oz	"U.S. Male"	Tom Fontana and Bradford Winters	HBO

=== 2000s ===
Year	Series	Episode	Winners/nominees	Network
2000 (53rd)
2000 (53rd)	The West Wing	"In Excelsis Deo"	Aaron Sorkin and Rick Cleveland	NBC
2000 (53rd)	Once and Again	"Strangers and Brothers"	Richard Kramer	ABC
2000 (53rd)	The Sopranos	"Big Girls Don't Cry"	Terence Winter	HBO
2000 (53rd)	The Sopranos	"The Knight in White Satin Armor"	Robin Green and Mitchell Burgess	HBO
2000 (53rd)	The West Wing	"Enemies"	Story by : Rick Cleveland, Lawrence O'Donnell and Patrick Caddell; Teleplay by : Ron Osborn and Jeff Reno	NBC
2000 (53rd)	The West Wing	"Take This Sabbath Day"	Story by : Lawrence O'Donnell, Paul Redford and Aaron Sorkin; Teleplay by : Aaron Sorkin	NBC
2001 (54th)
2001 (54th)	The Sopranos	"Pine Barrens"	Story by : Tim Van Patten and Terence Winter; Teleplay by : Terence Winter	HBO
2001 (54th)	CSI: Crime Scene Investigation	"Blood Drops"	Story by : Tish McCarthy; Teleplay by : Ann Donahue	CBS
2001 (54th)	The Sopranos	"Employee of the Month"	Robin Green and Mitchell Burgess	HBO
2001 (54th)	The Sopranos	"Proshai, Livushka"	David Chase	HBO
2001 (54th)	The West Wing	"Somebody's Going to Emergency, Somebody's Going to Jail"	Paul Redford and Aaron Sorkin	NBC
2001 (54th)	The West Wing	"Two Cathedrals"	Aaron Sorkin	NBC
2002 (55th)
2002 (55th)	The Education of Max Bickford	"Pilot"	Dawn Prestwich and Nicole Yorkin	CBS
2002 (55th)	ER	"On the Beach"	John Wells	NBC
2002 (55th)	Resurrection Blvd.	"Nino del Polvo"	Robert Eisele	Showtime
2002 (55th)	Six Feet Under	"In Place of Anger"	Christian Taylor	HBO
2002 (55th)	The Sopranos	"Whoever Did This"	Robin Green and Mitchell Burgess	HBO
2002 (55th)	The West Wing	"Game On"	Aaron Sorkin and Paul Redford	NBC
2003 (56th)
2003 (56th)	24	"Day 2: 7:00 p.m. – 8:00 p.m."	Evan Katz	Fox
2003 (56th)	Law & Order	"Bounty"	Michael S. Chernuchin	NBC
2003 (56th)	Law & Order: Special Victims Unit	"Abomination"	Michele Fazekas and Tara Butters	NBC
2003 (56th)	Law & Order: Special Victims Unit	"Loss"	Michele Fazekas and Tara Butters	NBC
2003 (56th)	The O.C.	"Pilot"	Josh Schwartz	Fox
2003 (56th)	The West Wing	"Disaster Relief"	Story by : Alexa Junge and Lauren Schmidt; Teleplay by : Alexa Junge	NBC
2004 (57th)
2004 (57th)	The West Wing	"The Supremes"	Debora Cahn	NBC
2004 (57th)	Six Feet Under	"Falling into Place"	Craig Wright	HBO
2004 (57th)	The Sopranos	"Long Term Parking"	Terence Winter	HBO
2004 (57th)	The West Wing	"Memorial Day"	John Sacret Young and Josh Singer	NBC
2005 (58th)
2005 (58th)	House	"Autopsy"	Lawrence Kaplow	Fox
2005 (58th)	CSI: Crime Scene Investigation	"Grave Danger"	Story by : Quentin Tarantino; Teleplay by : Naren Shankar, Anthony E. Zuiker and Carol Mendelsohn	CBS
2005 (58th)	Nip/Tuck	"Rhea Reynolds"	Jennifer Salt	FX
2005 (58th)	Six Feet Under	"Singing for Our Lives"	Scott Buck	HBO
2005 (58th)	Veronica Mars	"Normal Is the Watchword"	Rob Thomas	UPN
2005 (58th)	The West Wing	"A Good Day"	Carol Flint	NBC
2006 (59th)
2006 (59th)	Big Love	"Pilot"	Mark V. Olsen and Will Scheffer	HBO
2006 (59th)	Battlestar Galactica	"Occupation" / "Precipice"	Ronald D. Moore	Sci-Fi
2006 (59th)	Lost	"Two for the Road"	Elizabeth Sarnoff and Christina M. Kim	ABC
2006 (59th)	Nightmares & Dreamscapes: From the Stories of Stephen King	"The End of the Whole Mess"	Story by : Stephen King; Teleplay by : Lawrence D. Cohen	TNT
2006 (59th)	Studio 60 on the Sunset Strip	"Pilot"	Aaron Sorkin	NBC
2006 (59th)	The West Wing	"Election Day, Part 2"	Eli Attie and John Wells	NBC
2007 (60th)
2007 (60th)	The Sopranos	"The Second Coming"	Terence Winter	HBO
2007 (60th)	The Closer	"The Round File"	Michael Alaimo	TNT
2007 (60th)	Dexter	"The Dark Defender"	Tim Schlattmann	Showtime
2007 (60th)	Lost	"Flashes Before Your Eyes"	Damon Lindelof and Drew Goddard	ABC
2007 (60th)	Mad Men	"The Hobo Code"	Chris Provenzano	AMC
2007 (60th)	The Wire	"Final Grades"	Story by : David Simon and Ed Burns; Teleplay by : David Simon	HBO
2008 (61st)
2008 (61st)	Breaking Bad	"Pilot"	Vince Gilligan	AMC
2008 (61st)	Breaking Bad	"Gray Matter"	Patty Lin	AMC
2008 (61st)	Burn Notice	"Double Booked"	Craig O'Neill and Jason Tracey	USA
2008 (61st)	Dexter	"There's Something About Harry"	Scott Reynolds	Showtime
2008 (61st)	Eli Stone	"Faith"	Greg Berlanti and Marc Guggenheim	ABC
2008 (61st)	House	"Don't Ever Change"	Doris Egan and Leonard Dick	Fox
2009 (61st)
2009 (61st)	House	"Broken"	Russel Friend, Garrett Lerner, David Foster and David Shore	Fox
2009 (61st)	Big Love	"Come, Ye Saints"	Melanie Marnich	HBO
2009 (61st)	Breaking Bad	"Phoenix"	John Shiban	AMC
2009 (61st)	Mad Men	"The Grown-Ups"	Brett Johnson and Matthew Weiner	AMC
2009 (61st)	Mad Men	"Guy Walks Into an Advertising Agency"	Robin Veith and Matthew Weiner	AMC
2009 (61st)	True Blood	"I Will Rise Up"	Nancy Oliver	HBO

=== 2010s ===
Year	Series	Episode	Winners/nominees	Network
2010 (63rd)
2010 (63rd)	Mad Men	"The Chrysanthemum and the Sword"	Erin Levy	AMC
2010 (63rd)	Breaking Bad	"I.F.T."	George Mastras	AMC
2010 (63rd)	Breaking Bad	"I See You"	Gennifer Hutchison	AMC
2010 (63rd)	The Good Wife	"Boom"	Ted Humphrey	CBS
2010 (63rd)	House	"Help Me"	Russel Friend, Garrett Lerner and Peter Blake	Fox
2010 (63rd)	Lost	"The End"	Damon Lindelof and Carlton Cuse	ABC
2011 (64th)
2011 (64th)	Breaking Bad	"Box Cutter"	Vince Gilligan	AMC
2011 (64th)	Homeland	"The Good Soldier"	Henry Bromell	Showtime
2011 (64th)	Boardwalk Empire	"The Age of Reason"	Bathsheba Doran	HBO
2011 (64th)	Boardwalk Empire	"A Dangerous Maid"	Itamar Moses	HBO
2011 (64th)	Breaking Bad	"End Times"	Thomas Schnauz and Moira Walley-Beckett	AMC
2011 (64th)	Dexter	"Just Let Go"	Jace Richdale	Showtime
2012 (65th)
2012 (65th)	Mad Men	"The Other Woman"	Semi Chellas and Matthew Weiner	AMC
2012 (65th)	Breaking Bad	"Buyout"	Gennifer Hutchison	AMC
2012 (65th)	Breaking Bad	"Dead Freight"	George Mastras	AMC
2012 (65th)	Breaking Bad	"Fifty-One"	Sam Catlin	AMC
2012 (65th)	Breaking Bad	"Say My Name"	Thomas Schnauz	AMC
2012 (65th)	Homeland	"New Car Smell"	Meredith Stiehm	Showtime
2013 (66th)
2013 (66th)	Breaking Bad	"Confessions"	Gennifer Hutchison	AMC
2013 (66th)	Breaking Bad	"Buried"	Thomas Schnauz	AMC
2013 (66th)	Breaking Bad	"Granite State"	Peter Gould	AMC
2013 (66th)	The Good Wife	"Hitting the Fan"	Robert King and Michelle King	CBS
2013 (66th)	House of Cards	"Chapter 1"	Beau Willimon	Netflix
2013 (66th)	Masters of Sex	"Pilot"	Michelle Ashford	Showtime
2014 (67th)
2014 (67th)	The Good Wife	"The Last Call"	Robert King and Michelle King	CBS
2014 (67th)	Boardwalk Empire	"Devil You Know"	Howard Korder	HBO
2014 (67th)	Boardwalk Empire	"Friendless Child"	Riccardo DiLoreto, Cristine Chambers and Howard Korder	HBO
2014 (67th)	Game of Thrones	"The Lion and the Rose"	George R. R. Martin	HBO
2014 (67th)	Mad Men	"A Day's Work"	Jonathan Igla and Matthew Weiner	AMC
2014 (67th)	Rectify	"Donald the Normal"	Kate Powers and Ray McKinnon	Sundance TV
2015 (68th)
2015 (68th)	Better Call Saul	"Uno"	Vince Gilligan and Peter Gould	AMC
2015 (68th)	Game of Thrones	"Mother's Mercy"	David Benioff and D. B. Weiss	HBO
2015 (68th)	The Good Wife	"Mind's Eye"	Robert King and Michelle King	CBS
2015 (68th)	The Leftovers	"International Assassin"	Damon Lindelof and Nick Cuse	HBO
2015 (68th)	Mad Men	"Person to Person"	Matthew Weiner	AMC
2015 (68th)	Narcos	"Explosivos"	Andy Black	Netflix
2016 (69th)
2016 (69th)	This Is Us	"The Trip"	Vera Herbert	NBC
2016 (69th)	Better Call Saul	"Gloves Off"	Gordon Smith	AMC
2016 (69th)	Better Call Saul	"Klick"	Heather Marion and Vince Gilligan	AMC
2016 (69th)	Better Call Saul	"Switch"	Thomas Schnauz	AMC
2016 (69th)	Game of Thrones	"The Winds of Winter"	David Benioff and D. B. Weiss	HBO
2016 (69th)	Shameless	"I Am a Storm"	Sheila Callaghan	Showtime
2017 (70th)
2017 (70th)	Better Call Saul	"Chicanery"	Gordon Smith	AMC
2017 (70th)	The Americans	"The Soviet Division"	Joel Fields & Joe Weisberg	FX
2017 (70th)	Better Call Saul	"Slip"	Heather Marion	AMC
2017 (70th)	Good Behavior	"The Heart Attack is the Best Way"	Chad Hodge	TNT
2017 (70th)	The Leftovers	"The Book of Nora"	Story by : Tom Spezialy and Damon Lindelof; Teleplay by : Tom Perotta and Damon Lindelof	HBO
2017 (70th)	The OA	"Homecoming"	Brit Marling & Zal Batmanglij	Netflix
2018 (71st)
2018 (71st)	Homeland	"Paean to the People"	Alex Gansa	Showtime
2018 (71st)	The Affair	"407"	Story by : Jaquén Castellanos and Sarah Sutherland; Teleplay by : Lydia Diamond and Sarah Sutherland	Showtime
2018 (71st)	The Handmaid's Tale	"First Blood"	Eric Tuchman	Hulu
2018 (71st)	Narcos: Mexico	"Camelot"	Eric Newman & Clayton Trussell	Netflix
2018 (71st)	Ozark	"The Precious Blood of Jesus"	David Manson	Netflix
2018 (71st)	This Is Us	"The Car"	Isaac Aptaker & Elizabeth Berger	NBC
2019 (72nd)
2019 (72nd)	Succession	"Tern Haven"	Will Tracy	HBO
2019 (72nd)	The Crown	"Moondust"	Peter Morgan	Netflix
2019 (72nd)	Mr. Robot	"407 Proxy Authentication Required"	Sam Esmail	USA
2019 (72nd)	The OA	"Mirror Mirror"	Dominic Orlando & Claire Kiechel	Netflix
2019 (72nd)	Ray Donovan	"A Good Man is Hard to Find"	Joshua Marston	Showtime
2019 (72nd)	This Is Us	"Our Little Island Girl"	Eboni Freeman	NBC

=== 2020s ===
Year	Series	Episode	Winners/nominees	Network
2020 (73rd)
2020 (73rd)	Ozark	"Fire Pink"	Miki Johnson	Netflix
2020 (73rd)	Better Call Saul	"JMM"	Alison Tatlock	AMC
2020 (73rd)	Better Call Saul	"Something Unforgivable"	Peter Gould and Ariel Levine	AMC
2020 (73rd)	Better Call Saul	"Bad Choice Road"	Thomas Schnauz	AMC
2020 (73rd)	Euphoria	"Trouble Don't Last Always"	Sam Levinson	HBO
2020 (73rd)	Raised by Wolves	"Raised by Wolves"	Aaron Guzikowski	HBO Max
2021 (74th)
2021 (74th)	Succession	"Retired Janitors of Idaho"	Tony Roche & Susan Soon He Stanton	HBO
2021 (74th)	1883	"1883"	Taylor Sheridan	Paramount+
2021 (74th)	The Handmaid's Tale	"Testimony"	Kira Snyder	Hulu
2021 (74th)	The Morning Show	"La Amara Vita"	Kerry Ehrin & Scott Troy	Apple TV+
2021 (74th)	New Amsterdam	"The New Normal"	David Schulner	NBC
2021 (74th)	This Is Us	"Birth Mother"	Eboni Freeman & Kay Oyegun	NBC
2022 (75th)
2022 (75th)	Better Call Saul	"Plan and Execution"	Thomas Schnauz	AMC
2022 (75th)	Bad Sisters	"The Prick"	Sharon Horgan and Dave Finkel & Brett Baer	Apple TV+
2022 (75th)	Better Call Saul	"Rock and Hard Place"	Gordon Smith	AMC
2022 (75th)	The Good Fight	"The End of Everything"	Robert King and Michelle King	Paramount+
2022 (75th)	Ozark	"A Hard Way to Go"	Chris Mundy	Netflix
2022 (75th)	Severance	"The We We Are"	Dan Erickson	Apple TV+
2023 (76th)
2023 (76th)	Succession	"Living+"	Georgia Pritchett and Will Arbery	HBO
2023 (76th)	The Crown	"Sleep, Dearie Sleep"	Peter Morgan	Netflix
2023 (76th)	Godfather of Harlem	"Our Black Shining Prince"	Chris Brancato and Michael Panes	MGM+
2023 (76th)	Queen Charlotte: A Bridgerton Story	"Crown Jewels"	Shonda Rhimes	Netflix
2023 (76th)	Star Trek: Picard	"The Last Generation"	Terry Matalas	Paramount+
2023 (76th)	Succession	"Kill List"	Jon Brown and Ted Cohen	HBO
2024 (77th)
2024 (77th)	Shōgun	"Anjin"	Rachel Kondo & Justin Marks	FX on Hulu
2024 (77th)	Elsbeth	"Pilot"	Robert & Michelle King	CBS
2024 (77th)	Evil	"Fear of the End"	Rockne S. O'Bannon and Nialla LeBouef	Paramount+
2024 (77th)	Fallout	"The End"	Geneva Robertson-Dworet and Graham Wagner	Prime Video
2024 (77th)	Mr. & Mrs. Smith	"First Date"	Francesca Sloane & Donald Glover	Prime Video
2024 (77th)	Sugar	"Olivia"	Mark Protosevich	Apple TV+
2025 (78th)
2025 (78th)	The Pitt	"7:00 A.M."	R. Scott Gemmill	Max
2025 (78th)	Forever	"Reunion"	Mara Brock Akil	Netflix
2025 (78th)	The Handmaid's Tale	"Execution"	Eric Tuchman	Hulu
2025 (78th)	Pluribus	"Charm Offensive"	Jonny Gomez	Apple TV
2025 (78th)	Pluribus	"Got Milk"	Ariel Levine	Apple TV
2025 (78th)	Task	"A Still Small Voice"	Brad Ingelsby	HBO

== Total awards ==
- NBC – 21
- ABC – 14
- CBS – 11
- AMC – 8
- HBO – 7
- Fox – 3
- Showtime – 2
- Syndicated – 1

== Writers with multiple awards ==
3 awards

- Tom Fontana
- Vince Gilligan

2 awards

- Steven Bochco
- Henry Bromell
- Harlan Ellison
- Debra Frank
- Georgia Jeffries
- Robert Lewin
- David Milch
- Carl Sautter
- Michael Wagner
- Terence Winter

== Programs with multiple awards ==
4 awards

- Hill Street Blues (NBC)

3 awards

- Better Call Saul (AMC)
- Breaking Bad (AMC)
- The Sopranos (HBO)
- Succession (HBO)

2 awards

- Cagney & Lacey (CBS)
- Homeland (Showtime)
- Homicide: Life on the Street (NBC)
- House (Fox)
- Judd, for the Defense (ABC)
- Lou Grant (CBS)
- Mad Men (AMC)
- Moonlighting (ABC)
- Naked City (ABC)
- thirtysomething (ABC) (Note: thirtysomething's double win in 1988 is counted as only one win.)
- The West Wing (NBC)

== Writers with multiple nominations ==
12 nominations

- Steven Bochco
- Tom Fontana

10 nominations

- David Milch

8 nominations

- David E. Kelley
- Jeffrey Lewis

6 nominations

- John Masius
- Thomas Schnauz
- Aaron Sorkin
- John Wells

5 nominations

- Stephen J. Cannell
- Robin Green
- Michelle King
- Robert King
- Matthew Weiner

4 nominations

- Mitchell Burgess
- Vince Gilligan
- Damon Lindelof
- Michael Wagner
- Terence Winter
- John Sacret Young

3 nominations

- David Chase
- Michael S. Chernuchin
- Terry Louise Fisher
- Carol Flint
- Mark Frost
- Channing Gibson
- Peter Gould
- Karen Hall
- Gennifer Hutchison
- Paul Redford
- David Simon
- Gordon Smith
- Anthony Yerkovich
- Ed Zuckerman

2 nominations

- Neal Baer
- Rene Balcer
- David Benioff
- Harve Bennett
- William Blinn
- Alan Brennert
- Jim Byrnes
- Rick Cleveland
- John T. Dugan
- John Dunkel
- Harlan Ellison
- Pat Fielder
- William M. Finkelstein
- Debra Frank
- Eboni Freeman
- Leonard Freeman
- Russel Friend
- Bruce Geller
- Michael Gleason
- Gary David Goldberg
- Mel Goldberg
- Walon Green
- Earl Hamner
- Georgia Jeffries
- Ernest Kinoy
- Howard Korder
- Richard Kramer
- Anthony Lawrence
- Joanna Lee
- Peter Lefcourt
- Garrett Lerner
- Ariel Levine
- Robert Lewin
- David Lloyd
- Heather Marion
- George Mastras
- John McGreevey
- David Mills
- Peter Morgan
- Lawrence O'Donnell
- Ron Osborn
- Jeff Reno
- Mark Rodgers
- Carl Sautter
- April Smith
- Eric Tuchman
- D.B Weiss
- Dick Wolf
- Lydia Woodward
- James Yoshimura

== Programs with multiple nominations ==
15 nominations

- Hill Street Blues (NBC)

14 nominations

- Breaking Bad (AMC)
- Lou Grant (CBS)

11 nominations

- Better Call Saul (AMC)
- The West Wing (NBC)

9 nominations

- Law & Order (NBC)
- The Sopranos (HBO)
- The Waltons (CBS)

8 nominations

- Homicide: Life on the Street (NBC)

7 nominations

- China Beach (ABC)
- Mad Men (AMC)
- St. Elsewhere (NBC)
- thirtysomething (ABC)

6 nominations

- Cagney & Lacey (CBS)
- L.A. Law (NBC)

5 nominations

- ER (NBC)
- Gunsmoke (CBS)
- Moonlighting (ABC)
- The Rockford Files (NBC)

4 nominations

- Boardwalk Empire (HBO)
- The Good Wife (CBS)
- Hawaii Five-O (CBS)
- House (Fox)
- Judd, for the Defense (ABC)
- Naked City (ABC)
- Succession (HBO)
- This Is Us (NBC)

3 nominations

- Ben Casey (ABC)
- Columbo (NBC)
- The Defenders (CBS)
- Dexter (Showtime)
- Game of Thrones (HBO)
- The Handmaid's Tale (Hulu)
- Homeland (Showtime)
- I'll Fly Away (NBC)
- Lost (ABC)
- Marcus Welby, M.D. (ABC)
- McCloud (NBC)
- The Mod Squad (ABC)
- Northern Exposure (CBS)
- NYPD Blue (ABC)
- Ozark (Netflix)
- Six Feet Under (HBO)
- Star Trek (NBC)

2 nominations

- Big Love (HBO)
- Bracken's World (NBC)
- Channing (ABC)
- The Crown (Netflix)
- CSI: Crime Scene Investigation (CBS)
- The Fugitive (ABC)
- Law & Order: Special Victims Unit (NBC)
- The Leftovers (HBO)
- M*A*S*H (CBS)
- Picket Fences (CBS)
- Pluribus (Apple TV)
- Route 66 (CBS)
- Slattery's People (CBS)
- The OA (Netflix)
- The Streets of San Francisco (ABC)
- The Virginian (NBC)
