= Bop Gun (Homicide: Life on the Street) =

- Homicide: Life on the Street episode
- Robin Williams in a guest appearance as the husband of a slain tourist. A young Jake Gyllenhaal is to his left.
- Episode no.: Season 2 Episode 4
- Directed by: Stephen Gyllenhaal
- Story by: Tom Fontana
- Teleplay by: David Mills; David Simon
- Cinematography by: Jean de Segonzac
- Production code: 204
- Original air date: January 6, 1994

Guest appearances
- Robin Williams as Robert Ellison; Lloyd Goodman as Vaughn Perkins; Antonio D. Charity as Kid Funkadelic / Marvin; Julia Devin as Abby Ellison; Jake Gyllenhaal as Matt Ellison; Caron Tate as Renee Perkins; Vincent Miller as Tweety; Kay W. Lawal as Rose Landry; Mel Proctor as Grant Besser; Sharon Ziman as Naomi

Episode chronology
← Previous "Night of the Dead Living"	Next → "See No Evil"
- List of Homicide: Life on the Street episodes

"Bop Gun" is the second season finale of the American police drama television series Homicide: Life on the Street, and the thirteenth overall episode of the series. It originally aired on NBC in the United States on January 6, 1994, as the season premiere. In the episode, the Baltimore homicide unit investigates the shooting death of the wife of a tourist, played by guest star Robin Williams.

The episode was written by David Mills and David Simon based on a story by executive producer Tom Fontana, and directed by Stephen Gyllenhaal. In response to network feedback and poor ratings from the first season, "Bop Gun" marked several changes in the series, including a less bleak visual style and a greater focus on one plot, rather than multiple subplots. It was also the first episode to focus primarily on a homicide victim, rather than on the detectives. Simon felt the dialogue was realistic, especially that of the dark humor employed by detectives as a coping mechanism for dealing with the horrors of the job.

Williams previously worked with Homicide executive producer Barry Levinson on the films Good Morning, Vietnam (1987) and Toys (1992). This led to speculation that Williams took the role on "Bop Gun" as a favor to Levinson, but the actor insisted it was out of admiration for the series itself. A young Jake Gyllenhaal, the son of the episode's director, makes an appearance as Williams' son. The episode was the first to feature Chris Tergesen as music coordinator, which resulted in the use of more songs than previous episodes, including "Killer" by Seal and "Feels Like Rain" by Buddy Guy.

"Bop Gun" was seen by 16.3 million viewers, one of the highest Nielsen ratings of the week, thanks in large part due to interest in Williams' appearance. The episode received generally positive reviews, with several particularly complimenting the dramatic performance by Williams. "Bop Gun" won a Writers Guild of America Award for Best Screenplay of an Episodic Drama. Williams also received an Emmy Award nomination for Guest Actor in a Drama Series. The episode, along with the rest of the first and second seasons of Homicide: Life on the Street was released on DVD in the United States on May 27, 2003.

== Plot summary ==
Felton (Daniel Baldwin) and Howard (Melissa Leo) investigate the murder of an Iowa woman who was shot to death in front of her husband, Robert Ellison (Robin Williams), and their two young children during a mugging. Since the victims are tourists, the case becomes a "red ball" and receives considerable attention from the press, city officials and top police brass. Bayliss (Kyle Secor) tries to interview the children, but Ellison stops him, protesting that the experience is too hard on them. After obtaining information from street thugs, the police arrest Marvin (Antonio Charity), who possesses .45 caliber bullets matching those used in the shooting.

Marvin tells the detectives that he's a "stone stick-up man" who has robbed dozens of people and never shot anyone because people don't argue with a .45-carrying man, and also that he knows he will spend decades in prison anyway because he was involved in the shooting so there is no reason to lie about being the shooter. A mournful Ellison overhears Felton joking about the investigation and bragging about the overtime he expects to receive from it. He angrily demands Felton be thrown off the case, but Gee (Yaphet Kotto) calms him down by explaining the police have to be detached from the victims because they encounter so many. Ellison takes his children back to their hotel room, where his daughter Abby (Julia Devin) is in denial about her mother's death, and his son Matt (Jake Gyllenhaal) angrily refuses to talk to his father.

Police arrest a second suspect named Tweety (Vincent Miller), who was found in possession of the murdered woman's locket. The detectives question Marvin and Tweety separately until Tweety identifies the shooter as 19-year-old Vaughn Perkins (Lloyd Goodman). Howard is surprised to learn Vaughn has a mostly clean criminal record, and his family insists Vaughn would never kill anybody. Vaughn is arrested without incident, but Ellison is unable to identify the three suspects because he does not remember their faces. Meanwhile, Ellison sees his wife's body in the morgue and gets upset that her clothes and wedding ring have been removed. Bayliss later returns the ring to Ellison, who admits he feels guilty for not protecting his wife or stopping the shooter. Ellison asks to hold Bayliss' gun just to know how it feels, and Bayliss reluctantly agrees.

Howard repeatedly questions Vaughn, believing he is acting as the fall guy for his two friends. Vaughn says nothing, but eventually writes a letter of apology to Ellison. Felton closes the case despite Howard's protests for more time to investigate. Vaughn eventually pleads guilty at his arraignment and insists on serving life without parole. Marvin and Tweety are sentenced to thirty years in prison, but Ellison tells Howard he feels no comfort because his wife is still dead. Howard tries to give Vaughn's letter to Ellison, but he refuses to accept it. Howard eventually speaks directly to Vaughn in prison, where Vaughn admits he handled the gun during the stick-up because he thought if he had the gun, he could control the situation and prevent anyone from getting hurt. Vaughn said he lost control of the robbery, and insists he needs to serve his life sentence to make amends. A devastated Howard finally agrees with Felton's opinion that Vaughn was indeed the shooter.

== Production ==
Despite critical acclaim, Homicide: Life on the Street suffered from poor ratings throughout its first season, prompting NBC to consider taking it off the air. After a nine-episode first season, the network approved four more episodes for the show's second season as a trial run to determine whether to continue or cancel the show. The script for "Bop Gun" was completed before the first season ended, but NBC executives asked for several refinements – including less involved plots and fewer camera movements – before approving a second season. In an attempt to appease the network and improve ratings, executive producers Barry Levinson and Tom Fontana sought to make subtle changes to give the show a stronger mainstream appeal, while aiming not to compromise its integrity or originality. With "Bop Gun", the producers slightly toned down the bleak visual style and hand-held photography motif. It is also the first episode to focus on a single story, rather than multiple subplots, which Fontana felt allowed the writers to tell the main story better. Fontana said of the changes to the series, "We were experimenting with our first nine episodes. Whenever you try something new, you tend to err on the side of breaking ground. But we'd rather have more people watching, so the colors and lighting are slightly brighter, and the camera movements are not as jarring." "Bop Gun" marked the first episode with Jean de Segonzac as director of photography. The first scene, which depicts the moments immediately before the shooting, juxtaposes shots of the Ellison family admiring the tourist attractions of Baltimore with shots of their shooters playing basketball before following the family. The photography depicts the different sides of Baltimore by presenting the Ellison family shots like a cheerful tourist advertisement, with the other shots presenting a grittier image of the city.

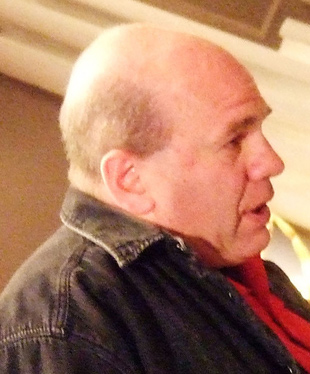
David Simon (pictured) wrote "Bop Gun" along with screenwriter David Mills.

"Bop Gun" marked the first episode in its new time slot on Thursdays at 10 p.m., occupying a period previously filled by L.A. Law. The show previously aired 9 p.m. on Wednesdays, where it was regularly defeated in the ratings by the ABC comedy Home Improvement. "Bop Gun" was written by David Mills and David Simon based on a story by Fontana. It was directed by Stephen Gyllenhaal, a feature director then-best known for such films as Waterland (1992) and A Dangerous Woman (1993). It was the first television script written by Mills, who previously worked as a reporter and became friends with Simon while studying journalism at the University of Maryland, College Park. Mills said of "Bop Gun", "That script inspired me to quit journalism. It was a golden opportunity, even though I didn't know what I was doing. I developed bad habits as a newspaper feature writer. I would always stretch a project to fill the available time." "Bop Gun" served as a departure from previous Homicide: Life on the Street episodes by focusing more strongly on a murder victim, rather than on the detectives. Simon felt the script's dialogue, particularly the detectives' use of dark humor as a coping mechanism for dealing with the horrors of the homicide unit, were faithful to reality. He particularly cited the scene in which Felton angers Ellison by talking excitedly about how much overtime he expected to get. Simon said, "That's a conversation that would happen. It would happen in any homicide unit in America, and when I saw it actually being acted out I got a real kick in the pants because I thought, 'Wherever there are homicide detectives watching this, they're cracking up because they know how true it is.'"

"Bop Gun" was originally meant to serve as the second season finale, but NBC decided to make it the season premiere with the hopes of getting increased ratings from a guest appearance by Robin Williams. Williams portrayed Robert Ellison, the husband of a slain woman tourist. Several news sources indicated Williams took on the role as a favor to Homicide executive producer Barry Levinson, who directed Williams in the films Good Morning, Vietnam (1987) and Toys (1992). But Fontana said Williams agreed to take the part based on the actor's positive impression of both the show in general and the "Bop Gun" script in particular. Fontana said of Williams, "He read the script, responded instantly and said, 'When do you want me there?'. He could not have been more prepared or more of a gentleman to everyone, and he worked his tail off. That whole experience was a joy." Williams himself said of the show, "Visually, it was just so different from anything else on television." Although Williams was primarily known for his comedic work, the Homicide producers and Williams himself consciously decided to remain true to the original script, rejecting the idea of adding humor or jokes to the episode. Williams' scenes were filmed over three days, and the actors found the part emotionally draining. Fontana said, "[Williams] worked like a dog. It was quite a special event for all of us. It's very intense."

A 13-year-old Jake Gyllenhaal, son of the episode's director Stephen, made one of his earliest acting performances in "Bop Gun" as Matt, the young son of Robert Ellison. Williams and Homicide regular Richard Belzer were acquainted from a HBO comedy special they both appeared in, although the two had never acted together before. The two often joked between filming takes, except for during Williams' most dramatic scenes. The episode also featured Vincent Miller, an actor who worked primarily in the Washington, D.C. area, as Tweety.

== Music ==
With songs like Seal's "Killer" and Buddy Guy's "Feels Like Rain' played at full volume, Homicide suddenly seemed more urgent and more cool.

— David P. Kalat,
Homicide: Life on the Street:
The Unofficial Companion

"Bop Gun" was the first episode to feature Chris Tergesen as music coordinator, and thus more music is featured in it than any previous episodes. During the opening scene, the song "Killer" by Seal and Adamski plays over a brief montage of images of Vaughn Perkins, just as Tweety and Marvin preparing to rob the Ellison family. When he is arrested, Marvin is wearing headphones, listening to the Public Enemy song "Gett off My Back". The Eric B. & Rakim song "Chinese Arithmetic" plays during the scene in which police simultaneously interview Tweety and Marvin. "Feels Like Rain", by the blues guitarist and singer Buddy Guy, plays as Howard arrives to talk to Vaughn, and when she leaves after talking to him, in the episode's final scene. The song "Don't Start Me to Talkin'", by blues harmonica player Sonny Boy Williamson II, was also featured in the episode.

Tergesen was a fan of the funk band Parliament-Funkadelic, and the episode has several references to the group as a result. The episode's title derives from the band's song "Bop Gun (Endangered Species)", and during one scene a criminal claims he shot someone over the destruction of a rare record by Eddie Hazel, a member of Funkadelic. Additionally, one of the street thug characters is named Kid Funkadelic.

== Reception ==
=== Ratings ===
In its original American broadcast on January 6, 1994, "Bop Gun" was seen by 16.3 million viewers, a higher-than-usual Homicide: Life on the Street rating in large part to interest in Williams' appearance. It received a 17.3 Nielsen rating and a 28 share, the highest rating for a 10 p.m. drama series since January 1992. The rating placed Homicide among the top ten network television Nielsen ratings for the week, and outperformed the ratings of L.A. Law, which normally filled the 10 p.m. Thursday timeslot. NBC Entertainment president Warren Littlefield said the ratings "far exceeded expectations", and said he expected the series to return for a third season if the viewership remained strong. Littlefield said of the Homicide ratings:

"These are outstanding numbers for a dramatic television series. If we can keep a reasonable level of audience, we believe in the work, we believe in the creative team we think we have, perhaps the most outstanding ensemble cast in all of television. We just would like to see continued signs of life."

=== Reviews ===
It's a terrific show, with a wonderful and unexpectedly understated performance by Williams. Nothing in the hour seems simple or formulaic. In other words, it's not like most TV.

— Benjamin Morrison,
The Times-Picayune

"Bop Gun" received generally positive reviews, and was identified by The Baltimore Sun as one of the ten best episodes of the series. Sun writer David Zurawik said Gyllenhaal's direction was as good as anything he had done in film, and called the script "one of the most ambitious scripts you'll see on TV this year". Lon Grahnke of the Chicago Sun-Times gave the episode his highest rating of four stars, and called Williams portrayal "a piercing dramatic performance". Grahnke also said, "In one hour, 'Bop Gun' says more about firearms, urban tragedies, crime victims and racial politics than any yammering congressman trying to blame television for our violent society." Entertainment Weekly critic Ken Tucker complimented the episode, noting, "Don't let Williams distract you from the real stuff here: the brilliantly jagged murder-investigation scenes and the exceptional performances from homicide-detective costars Daniel Baldwin and Melissa Leo." Tribune Company television critic Kate O'Hare praised "Bop Gun" for focusing on characterization and dialogue rather than action, and said of the episode, "With a mix of intense emotion, dogged police work and humorous banter among the detectives, "Bop Gun" typifies the philosophy of Homicide." David P. Kalat, author of Homicide: Life on the Street - The Unofficial Companion, called it a "grueling" episode, and that Williams performed "probably his finest noncomedic performance ever". The Philadelphia Inquirer television critic Jonathan Storm lauded the cast, the "visual art of the camera" and the "realistic, yet nearly literary dialogue" of "Bop Gun".

The Times-Picayune writer Benjamin Morrison praised the "unexpectedly understated" performance of Williams and praised the episode for not being simple or formulaic. He suggested viewers who were crime victims themselves would be particularly moved by the script. Hal Boedeker, television critic with The Miami Herald, called the episode an "uncompromising hour" and "the highest order for network TV". He said Williams "astonishes in every scene", and praised the script for not racing over topics as many television shows do, but rather taking "full measure of the weight of grief". Elaine Liner, television critic with the Corpus Christi Caller-Times, described Williams' performance as "heartbreaking", but particularly praised the writers for "taking the show to a higher level" by making the perpetrator sympathetic and three-dimensional, not only the victim. Liner said, "Fontana succeeds in fleshing out the characters on both sides of this tragedy." Bob Langford of The News & Observer called the episode "brilliant" and praised it for focusing not on the crime but on the effects of it, as well as the realistic portrayals regarding race, such as concerns the crime would keep away white tourists. Langford said it was occasionally preachy, but said "Sometimes, a good sermon is what we need. Amazing that one this powerful can come from a TV show."

Adam Sandler of Daily Variety praised the cast, the hysteria and confusion conveyed in Gyllenhaal's direction, and the "themes of police insensitivity, victims rights and dysfunctional families" in the script. The Washington Post writer Harriet Winslow called Williams' performance poignant and riveting, and called the fact that it did not overshadow the other actors a "tribute to the quality of this cast". John J. O'Connor of The New York Times called the episode "extraordinary" and said "The senselessness of the incident is heartbreakingly captured". St. Louis Post-Dispatch writer Gail Pennington praised Williams' "controlled performance" as well as several "terrific scenes". Among them, she said, were Gee's explanation of how police use humor as a buffer from the horrors of their jobs, and the scene where detectives simultaneously interrogate two suspects in different rooms, which she said was "choreographed as tightly as the Bolshoi Ballet".

Not all reviews were so positive. The Dallas Morning News writer Ed Bark called Williams' a "sometimes overly transparent effort to underscore the grief of the victims' survivors", and said the episode "works overtime" to make the world seem like a "bleak and scary place". Bark also said the show made itself a "target for charges of racism" by making the three murderers black, but also credited the script with making one of the perpetrators so sympathetic. Tom Shales of The Washington Post said the writers "try a little too hard" to create sympathy for the three murder suspects, and the episode suffers due to the absence of actor Andre Braugher, who plays Detective Frank Pembleton. But Shales also praised Williams' performance and said the episode was particularly powerful because the actual violence is off-screen. Buzz McCain, columnist with The Washington Times, called the episode "irritating" and "as pointless as the killing". He particularly criticized the script, which he said was clichéd and overly "misty-eyed", particularly the extended moments of Williams talking about the shooting. In a later article, McCain said, "Nothing I've written in this column generated as much visceral response as my nine paragraphs about ("Bop Gun")." In addition to responses from angry fans, McCain received a call from David Mills, who McCain said "simply wanted some insight as to what specifically I didn't like about his show and how the writers might improve on the next one."

Robin Williams' performance in "Bop Gun" was among a list of the ten best guest star moments in television history, compiled by the Star Tribune in April 2001.

=== Awards ===
"Bop Gun" won a Writers Guild of America Award for Best Screenplay of an Episodic Drama. It defeated competing episodes of Northern Exposure and NYPD Blue, as well as another second season Homicide episode, "A Many Splendored Thing". Robin Williams also received an Emmy Award nomination for Guest Actor in a Drama Series. It was the only Emmy nomination Homicide: Life on the Street received in the 46th Primetime Emmy Awards; the series received four nominations the previous year. Williams lost the award to Richard Kiley for his performance in CBS drama series Picket Fences; the other nominees were Dan Hedaya, James Earl Jones and Tim Curry.

== Home media ==
"Bop Gun" and the rest of the first and second season episodes were included in the four-DVD box-set "Homicide: Life on the Street: The Complete Seasons 1 & 2", which was released by A&E Home Video on May 27, 2003 for $69.95.
