= Noel Behn =

American novelist (1928–1998)

Noel Ira Behn (Chicago, January 6, 1928 – New York, July 27, 1998) was an American novelist, screenwriter and theatrical producer.

His first novel, The Kremlin Letter, drawn from his work in the US Army's Counterintelligence Corps, was published in 1966 and made into a film by John Huston in 1970. Behn's non-fiction Big Stick-Up at Brink's about a 1950 raid on a Boston armoured car facility, was published in 1977 and adapted into a 1978 movie, The Brink's Job, starring Peter Falk and Peter Boyle. His controversial book Lindbergh: The Crime (1993) delved into the Lindbergh kidnapping, claiming that the baby had died in a family accident, and the kidnapping was faked.

Behn was influential in the development of Off Broadway theatre in New York and he was producing director of the Cherry Lane Theater throughout the 1950s and 1960s. Among the influential works premiered there under his direction were Sean O’Casey’s Purple Dust and Samuel Beckett’s Endgame. Beginning in the late 1960s, owing to the happenstance of having offices in the same building on 57th Street in New York City, Behn began longstanding creative friendships with screenwriter Paddy Chayefsky, choreographer Bob Fosse and playwright Herb Gardner. He also wrote seven episodes of Homicide: Life on the Street between 1993 and 1997. The second episode of the third season of the prison drama Oz was dedicated to his memory.

Behn became a well-known participant in the social life of Manhattan, often found at the Russian Tea Room (where he always took the first booth for lunch), and at Elaine's on the Upper East Side in the evening, where he talked and drank with writers such as Gay Talese, A. E. Hotchner, Peter Maas and Pete Hamill. Woody Allen was also a regular at Elaine's, and found acting roles for Behn in his films Stardust Memories (1980) and Another Woman (1988).

== Books ==
- The Kremlin Letter - a novel of espionage (1966)
- The Shadow Boxer (1971)
- Big Stick-Up at Brink's (1977)
- Seven Silent Men (1984)
- Lindbergh the Crime (1993)
