= List of The Wire characters =

The following is a listing of fictional characters from the HBO series The Wire, which has a large ensemble cast. Critics have described the characters as morally complex with no clear division into heroes and villains. Unusually for its time, the show had a large number of complex Black characters.

The series has no single main character; instead, the focus is on the city of Baltimore and its institutions. All of the characters ultimately serve the purpose of telling a story about the American city. The viewer is expected to see how the characters are connected to a larger system that the individual characters often lack the perspective to understand.

Many of the characters, such as Bunk Moreland and Bubbles, are based on specific real-life counterparts. Others, like Omar Little, are composites of multiple people.

== Appearances ==
=== Main cast ===
Actor	Character	Seasons					Episode count
Actor	Character	1	2	3	4	5	Episode count
Dominic West	Jimmy McNulty	Main	Main	Main	Main	Main	56
John Doman	William Rawls	Main	Main	Main	Main	Main	46
Idris Elba	Russell "Stringer" Bell	Main	Main	Main			36
Frankie R. Faison	Ervin Burrell	Main	Main	Main	Main	Recurring	40
Lawrence Gilliard Jr.	D'Angelo Barksdale	Main	Main				18
Wood Harris	Avon Barksdale	Main	Main	Main		Guest	32
Deirdre Lovejoy	Rhonda Pearlman	Main	Main	Main	Main	Main	44
Wendell Pierce	William "The Bunk" Moreland	Main	Main	Main	Main	Main	54
Lance Reddick	Cedric Daniels	Main	Main	Main	Main	Main	58
Andre Royo	Reginald "Bubbles" Cousins	Main	Main	Main	Main	Main	40
Sonja Sohn	Kima Greggs	Main	Main	Main	Main	Main	56
Chris Bauer	Frank Sobotka		Main				12
Paul Ben-Victor	Spiros "Vondas" Vondopoulos		Main		Guest	Recurring	15
Clarke Peters	Lester Freamon	Recurring	Main	Main	Main	Main	54
Amy Ryan	Beatrice "Beadie" Russell		Main	Guest	Recurring	Recurring	20
Aidan Gillen	Tommy Carcetti			Main	Main	Main	35
Jim True-Frost	Roland "Prez" Pryzbylewski	Recurring	Recurring	Main	Main	Guest	45
Robert Wisdom	Howard "Bunny" Colvin		Guest	Main	Main	Guest	25
Seth Gilliam	Ellis Carver	Recurring	Recurring	Main	Main	Main	50
Domenick Lombardozzi	Thomas "Herc" Hauk	Recurring	Recurring	Main	Main	Main	53
J. D. Williams	Preston "Bodie" Broadus	Recurring	Recurring	Main	Main		37
Michael K. Williams	Omar Little	Recurring	Recurring	Main	Main	Main	42
Corey Parker Robinson	Leander Sydnor	Recurring		Main	Main	Main	38
Reg E. Cathey	Norman Wilson				Main	Main	23
Chad L. Coleman	Dennis "Cutty" Wise			Recurring	Main	Guest	20
Jamie Hector	Marlo Stanfield			Recurring	Main	Main	32
Glynn Turman	Clarence Royce			Recurring	Main	Guest	16
Clark Johnson	Augustus Haynes					Main	10
Tom McCarthy	Scott Templeton					Main	10
Gbenga Akinnagbe	Chris Partlow			Recurring	Recurring	Main	26
Neal Huff	Michael Steintorf				Recurring	Main	11
Jermaine Crawford	Duquan "Dukie" Weems				Recurring	Main	20
Tristan Wilds	Michael Lee				Recurring	Main	22
Michael Kostroff	Maurice Levy	Recurring	Recurring	Recurring	Guest	Main	21
Michelle Paress	Alma Gutierrez					Main	10
Isiah Whitlock Jr.	Clay Davis	Recurring	Recurring	Recurring	Recurring	Main	22

=== Recurring cast ===
Actor	Character	Seasons					Episode count
Actor	Character	1	2	3	4	5	Episode count
Delaney Williams	Jay Landsman	Recurring	Recurring	Recurring	Recurring	Recurring	45
Robert F. Chew	Joseph "Proposition Joe" Stewart	Recurring	Recurring	Recurring	Recurring	Recurring	24
Maria Broom	Marla Daniels	Recurring	Recurring	Recurring	Recurring	Recurring	16
Tray Chaney	Malik "Poot" Carr	Recurring	Recurring	Recurring	Recurring	Guest	26
Melanie Nicholls-King	Cheryl	Recurring	Recurring	Recurring	Guest	Guest	15
Callie Thorne	Elena McNulty	Recurring	Recurring	Recurring	Guest	Guest	12
Michael Hyatt	Brianna Barksdale	Recurring	Recurring	Recurring	Guest		12
Doug Olear	Terrance "Fitz" Fitzhugh	Recurring	Recurring	Recurring		Recurring	13
Leo Fitzpatrick	Johnny Weeks	Recurring	Recurring	Recurring			15
Shamyl Brown	Donette	Recurring	Recurring	Recurring			12
Hassan Johnson	Roland "Wee-Bey" Brice	Recurring	Recurring	Guest	Recurring	Guest	20
Susan Rome	Ilene Nathan	Recurring	Recurring	Guest	Recurring		7
Erik Todd Dellums	Dr. Randall Frazier	Recurring	Recurring	Guest			6
Nat Benchley	Augustus Polk	Recurring	Recurring			Guest	8
Robert F. Colesberry	Ray Cole	Recurring	Recurring				8
Michael Salconi	Michael Santangelo	Recurring	Guest	Recurring	Recurring	Recurring	25
Ed Norris	Ed Norris	Recurring	Guest	Recurring	Recurring	Recurring	22
Brian Anthony Wilson	Vernon Holley	Recurring	Guest	Recurring	Recurring	Recurring	19
Antonio Cordova	Michael McNulty	Recurring	Guest	Recurring	Guest	Guest	10
Eric Gershowitz	Sean James McNulty	Recurring	Guest	Recurring	Guest	Guest	10
Peter Gerety	Daniel Phelan	Recurring	Guest	Recurring		Recurring	15
Wendy Grantham	Shardene Innes	Recurring	Guest			Guest	11
Richard DeAngelis	Raymond Foerster	Recurring		Recurring	Guest		15
Fredro Starr	Marquis "Bird" Hilton	Recurring	Guest				4
Tony D. Head	Bobby Reed	Recurring		Recurring	Guest		10
Bobby J. Brown	Robert "Bobby" Brown	Recurring		Guest	Recurring	Recurring	12
Steve Earle	Walon	Recurring			Guest	Recurring	8
Chris Clanton	Savino Bratton	Recurring				Recurring	8
Michael B. Jordan	Wallace	Recurring					13
Clayton LeBouef	Wendell "Orlando" Blocker	Recurring					8
Brandon Price	Anton "Stinkum" Artis	Recurring					8
Michael Kevin Darnall	Brandon Wright	Recurring					4
Al Brown	Stanislaus "Stan" Valchek	Guest	Recurring	Recurring	Recurring	Recurring	19
Michael Willis	Andy Krawczyk		Recurring	Recurring	Recurring	Recurring	15
Method Man	Melvin "Cheese" Wagstaff		Recurring	Recurring	Recurring	Recurring	13
S. Robert Morgan	Butchie		Recurring	Recurring	Recurring	Guest	10
Kelli R. Brown	Kimmy		Recurring	Recurring	Recurring		11
Richard Burton	Shaun "Shamrock" McGinty		Recurring	Recurring			20
Michael Potts	Brother Mouzone		Recurring	Recurring			7
DeAndre McCullough	Lamar		Recurring	Recurring			6
Edwina Findley	Tosha Mitchell		Recurring	Recurring			4
Benay Berger	Amanda Reese	Guest	Recurring	Guest		Recurring	8
Bill Raymond	The Greek		Recurring			Recurring	10
Pablo Schreiber	Nick Sobotka		Recurring			Guest	13
Jeffrey Pratt Gordon	Johnny "Fifty" Spamanto		Recurring			Guest	13
Luray Cooper	Nat Coxson		Recurring			Guest	12
Chris Ashworth	Sergei Malatov		Recurring			Guest	11
Richard Pelzman	Little Big Roy		Recurring			Guest	7
Gary "D.Reign"	Frog		Recurring			Guest	4
James Ransone	Ziggy Sobotka		Recurring				12
Charley Scalies	Thomas "Horseface" Pakusa		Recurring				12
Bus Howard	Vernon "Ott" Motley		Recurring				8
Jeffrey Fugitt	Claude Diggins		Recurring				7
Jill Redding	Delores		Recurring				7
Kristin Proctor	Aimee		Recurring				6
Kelvin Davis	La La		Recurring				6
Teddy Cañez	George "Double G" Glekas		Recurring				5
Lance Irwin	Maui		Recurring				5
Lev Gorn	Eton Ben-Eleazer		Recurring				5
Robert Hogan	Louis Sobotka		Recurring				4
Brook Yeaton	"White" Mike McArdle		Recurring				4
Tom Mardirosian	Kristos Koutris		Recurring				3
Jay Landsman	Dennis Mello		Guest	Recurring	Recurring	Recurring	18
Anwan Glover	Slim Charles			Recurring	Recurring	Recurring	27
Felicia Pearson	Felicia "Snoop" Pearson			Recurring	Recurring	Recurring	26
Ryan Sands	Lloyd "Truck" Garrick			Recurring	Recurring	Recurring	20
Benjamin Busch	Anthony Colicchio			Recurring	Recurring	Recurring	20
Gregory L. Williams	Michael Crutchfield			Recurring	Recurring	Recurring	19
Edward Green	Spider			Recurring	Recurring	Recurring	17
Frederick Strother	Odell Watkins			Recurring	Recurring	Recurring	15
Rick Otto	Kenneth Dozerman			Recurring	Recurring	Recurring	14
Megan Anderson	Jen Carcetti			Recurring	Recurring	Recurring	13
Troj Marquis Strickland	Fat Face Rick			Recurring	Recurring	Recurring	9
Melvin Williams	The Deacon			Recurring	Recurring	Guest	11
Cleo Reginald Pizana	Coleman Parker			Recurring	Recurring		15
Brandy Burre	Theresa D'Agostino			Recurring	Recurring		15
Christopher Mann	Anthony "Tony" Gray			Recurring	Recurring		12
Dravon James	Mrs. Grace Sampson			Recurring	Recurring		12
Joilet F. Harris	Caroline Massey			Recurring	Recurring		10
Justin Burley	Justin			Recurring	Recurring		10
Brandon Fobbs	Fruit			Recurring	Guest		8
Norris Davis	Vinson			Recurring		Recurring	7
Ernest Waddell	Dante		Guest	Recurring			9
Leonard A. Anderson	Gerard			Recurring			7
Brandan T. Tate	Sapper			Recurring			6
Melvin Jackson, Jr.	Bernard			Recurring			4
Mia Arnice Chambers	Squeak			Recurring			4
Gary D'Addario	Gary DiPasquale		Guest		Recurring	Recurring	5
Thuliso Dingwall	Kenard			Guest	Recurring	Recurring	19
Kwame Patterson	Monk Metcalf				Recurring	Recurring	17
Marlyne Afflack	Nerese Campbell				Recurring	Recurring	11
Keenon Brice	Aaron "Bug" Manigault				Recurring	Recurring	11
Dion Graham	Rupert Bond				Recurring	Recurring	8
Darrell Britt-Gibson	Darius "O-Dog" Hill				Recurring	Recurring	8
Shamika Cotton	Raylene Lee				Recurring	Recurring	8
Donnie Andrews	Donnie				Recurring	Recurring	6
Derrick Purvey	Big Guy				Recurring	Recurring	5
Maestro Harrell	Randy Wagstaff				Recurring	Guest	14
Julito McCullum	Namond Brice				Recurring	Guest	14
Tootsie Duvall	Marcia Donnelly				Recurring	Guest	12
Ramón Rodríguez	Renaldo				Recurring	Guest	8
Rashad Orange	Sherrod			Guest	Recurring		7
Dan DeLuca	Dr. David Parenti				Recurring		11
Nathan Corbett	Donut				Recurring		9
Sandi McCree	De'Londa Brice				Recurring		9
Taylor King	Zenobia Dawson				Recurring		9
Jonnie Louis Brown	Eddie Walker				Recurring		7
Stacie Davis	Miss Duquette				Recurring		6
Tyrell Baker	Little Kevin				Recurring		6
Boris McGiver	Charles Marimow				Recurring		6
Alfonso Christian Lover	Old Face Andre				Recurring		6
Richard Hildebird	Claudell Withers				Recurring		5
Gene Terinoni	Jimmy Asher				Recurring		3
Armando Cadogan, Jr	Bubbles' Tormentor				Recurring		5
Bill Zorzi	Bill Zorzi	Guest				Recurring	9
Michael Stone Forrest	Frank Barlow	Guest				Recurring	4
Todd Scofield	Jeff Price			Guest		Recurring	8
David Costabile	Thomas Klebanow					Recurring	9
Sam Freed	James Whiting					Recurring	9
Brandon Young	Mike Fletcher					Recurring	9
Donald Neal	Jay Spry					Recurring	7
Robert Poletick	Steven Luxenberg					Recurring	7
Thomas J. McCarthy	Tim Phelps					Recurring	7
Dennis Hill	Christeson					Recurring	5
Kara Quick	Rebecca Corbett					Recurring	5
Bruce Kirkpatrick	Roger Twigg					Recurring	4

== A to Z ==
=== A ===
- Aimee
- Artis, Anton "Stinkum"
- Asher, Jimmy

=== B ===
- Bailey, John
- Baker, Brian
- Barksdale, Avon
- Barksdale, Brianna
- Barksdale, D'Angelo
- Barlow, Frank
- Ben-Eleazer, Eton
- Bernard
- Bell, Russell "Stringer"
- "Big Guy"
- "Big Roy"
- Blocker, Wendell "Orlando"
- Bond, Rupert
- Bratton, Savino
- Brice, De'Londa
- Brice, Namond
- Brice, Roland "Wee-Bey"
- Broadus, Preston "Bodie"
- Brown, Bobby
- Brother Mouzone
- "Bubbles"
- Bubbles' Tormentor
- Burrell, Ervin
- Butchie

=== C ===
- Campbell, Nerese
- Cantrell, Walter
- Carcetti, Jen
- Carcetti, Thomas "Tommy"
- Carr, Malik "Poot"
- Carver, Ellis
- Castor, Aaron
- Cheryl
- "Chess"
- Christeson
- Cole, Ray
- Colicchio, Anthony
- Colvin, Howard "Bunny"
- Country
- Cousins, Reginald "Bubbles"
- Coxson, Nat
- Crutchfield, Michael

=== D ===
- D'Agostino, Theresa
- Daniels, Cedric
- Daniels, Marla
- Dante
- Davis, R. Clayton "Clay"
- Dawson, Zenobia
- The Deacon
- "Dee-Dee"
- Delores
- Demper, Steven
- DiBiago, Bruce
- DiPasquale, Gary
- Diggins, Claude
- Donette
- Donnie
- "Donut"
- Donnelly, Marcia
- Dozerman, Kenneth

=== F ===
- Fitzhugh, Terrance "Fitz"
- Fletcher, Mike
- Foerster, Raymond
- Frazier, Warren
- Frazier, Randall
- Freamon, Lester
- "Frog"
- "Fruit"

=== G ===
- Garrick, Lloyd "Truck"
- Gerard
- Gerry
- "Ghost"
- Glekas, George a.k.a. "Double G"
- Gray, Anthony
- "The Greek"
- Greggs, Shakima "Kima"
- Gutierrez, Alma

=== H ===
- Hauk, Thomas "Herc"
- Haynes, Augustus "Gus"
- Hendrix, Ricardo a.k.a. "Fat-Face Rick"
- Hilton, Marquis "Bird"
- Holley, Vernon
- "Hucklebuck"

=== I ===
- Innes, Shardene

=== J ===
- Jamal
- Judkins, Crystal
- Johnson, Herbert De'Rodd a.k.a. "Puddin"

=== K ===
- Kenard
- Kimmy
- Klebanow, Thomas
- Koutris, Kristos
- Krawczyk, Andy
- Kirk, Sylvester

=== L ===
- "La La"
- Lamar
- Lambert
- Landsman, Jay
- Lee, Michael
- Lee, Raylene
- Levy, Maurice
- "Little Big Roy"
- "Little Kevin"
- "Little Man"
- Little, Omar
- Luxenberg, Steven

=== M ===
- Mahon, Patrick
- Malatov, Sergei
- Manigault, Aaron "Bug"
- Manigault, Devar
- Manns, Nathaniel "Hungry Man"
- Marimow, Charles
- Massey, Caroline
- "Maui"
- McArdle, "White" Mike
- McGinty, Shaun "Shamrock"
- McNulty, Elena
- McNulty, Jimmy
- McNulty, Michael
- McNulty, Sean
- Mello, Dennis
- Metcalf,"Monk"
- Mitchell, Tosha
- Moreland, Bunk
- Motley, Vernon "Ott"

=== N ===
- Nathan, Ilene
- Norris, Ed

=== O ===
- "O-Dog"
- Old Face Andre

=== P ===
- Pakusa, Thomas "Horseface"
- Parenti, David
- Parker, Coleman
- Partlow, Chris
- Pearlman, Rhonda
- Pearson, Felicia "Snoop"
- Perkins, Eunetta
- Perry
- Phelan, Daniel
- Phelps, Tim
- "Phil-Boy"
- Polk, Augustus
- Price, Damien Lavelle a.k.a. "Day Day"
- Price, Jeff
- Pryzbylewski, Roland "Prez"

=== R ===
- Rawls, William
- Reed, Bobby
- Renaldo
- Reese, Amanda
- Rico
- "Ronnie Mo"
- Royce, Clarence
- Russell, Beatrice "Beadie"

=== S ===
- Sampson, Grace
- Santangelo, Michael
- Sapper
- Sherrod
- "Slim Charles"
- Sobotka, Frank
- Sobotka, Joan
- Sobotka, Louis
- Sobotka, Nick
- Sobotka, Ziggy
- Spamanto, Johnny "Fifty"
- Spry, Jay
- "Squeak"
- Stanfield, Marlo
- Sterling
- Stewart, "Proposition" Joe
- Stokes, Albert
- Sydnor, Leander

=== T ===
- Tank
- Taylor, Marvin
- Templeton, Scott
- Tilghman, Dwight
- Torret
- Twigg, Roger
- Tyson, Darnell

=== V ===
- Valchek, Stanislaus
- Vinson
- Vondopoulos, Spiros "Vondas"

=== W ===
- Wagstaff, Calvin/Melvin "Cheese"
- Wagstaff, Randy
- Wallace
- Walker, Eddie
- Walon
- Watkins, Odell
- Weeks, Johnny
- Weems, Duquan "Dukie"
- Whiting, James
- Williams, Karim
- Williamson, Kintel
- Wilson, Norman
- Wise, Dennis "Cutty"
- Withers, Claudell
- Wright, Brandon

=== Z ===
- Zorzi, Bill
