= The Wire season 5 =

The Wire
- Season 5
- DVD cover
- Starring: Dominic West; Reg E. Cathey; John Doman; Aidan Gillen; Clark Johnson; Deirdre Lovejoy; Tom McCarthy; Clarke Peters; Wendell Pierce; Lance Reddick; Andre Royo; Sonja Sohn; Seth Gilliam; Domenick Lombardozzi; Michael K. Williams; Gbenga Akinnagbe; Jamie Hector; Neal Huff; Jermaine Crawford; Corey Parker Robinson; Tristan Wilds; Michael Kostroff; Michelle Paress; Isiah Whitlock Jr.
- No. of episodes: 10

Release
- Original network: HBO
- Original release: January 6 – March 9, 2008

Season chronology
- ← Previous; Season 4

The fifth and final season of the television series The Wire commenced airing in the United States on January 6, 2008, and concluded on March 9, 2008; it was the show's shortest season with 10 episodes. The series introduced a fictionalized version of the Baltimore Sun newsroom, while continuing to follow the Baltimore police department and city hall, and the Stanfield crime syndicate.

The fifth season aired on Sundays at 9:00 pm ET in the United States. The season was released on DVD as a four-disc boxed set under the title of The Wire: The Complete Fifth Season on August 12, 2008 by HBO Video.

== Production ==
HBO announced on September 12, 2006, that a fifth and final season consisting of 13 episodes—but later reduced to ten—had been commissioned. Production for Season 5 officially began on April 30, 2007. Filming wrapped early in the morning of September 1, 2007 and the first episode aired on January 6, 2008.

In an interview with Slate on December 1, 2006, David Simon said that Season 5 would be about the media and media consumption. A major focus would be journalism, which would be dramatized through a newspaper modeled after The Baltimore Sun. The theme, according to Simon, would deal with "what stories get told and what don't and why it is that things stay the same."

Issues such as the quest for profit, the decrease in the number of reporters, and the end of aspiration for news quality would all be addressed, alongside the theme of homelessness. In the same interview, Simon indicated that no other theme seemed substantial enough to warrant a sixth season, except possibly the large influx of Latinos into Baltimore. He noted, however, that since no writer on the show spoke Spanish or had any intimate knowledge of the city's Latino population, the field work would be too cumbersome.

At the Night at the Wire event on June 9, 2007, Simon stated that Detective Sydnor is the only character who remains morally clean by the end of the show, but not perfectly since "after all, this is The Wire." He also hinted that Mayor Carcetti might make a run for governor.

The series continued the show's examination of the devaluing of human life and institutional dysfunction. The increased scope of the season to include the media allowed this theme to be explored through an examination of "the people who are supposed to be monitoring all this and sounding the alarm — the journalists." In particular Simon has spoken about the devaluing of the reporter in terms of downsizing a newspaper staff and the management expecting to do "more with less" when he asserts that in reality, you can only do "less with less."

The series realism has been reported as being maintained particularly through the accurate dialogue and use of contemporary slang. Series creator David Simon further expanded on the thematic content of season five in an interview with Fancast/Inside TV. Critic David Zurawik saw the unifying theme of the season as "public and private lies," particularly those perpetuated by the media and told by Jimmy McNulty in protest against cutbacks in the police department. TV Guide writer Matt Roush also saw the central theme as lies and characterized it as "deeply and darkly ironic."

=== Promotion ===
A preview for Season 5 of The Wire aired on HBO on October 28, 2007 and was later made available on YouTube. HBO sent critics the first seven episodes on DVD in December 2007.

HBO's On Demand and multiplatform marketing division approached creator David Simon about producing exclusive on-demand content and three short prequel clips were produced that take place prior to the linear storyline of the show. The clips were made available via Amazon.com from December 5 and through HBO's on-demand service from December 15.

The first video takes place in 1962 and focuses on the school days of drug kingpin Proposition Joe; the second is set in 1985 and focuses on Omar Little making an early robbery; the third video is set in 2000 and shows the first meeting of Jimmy McNulty (played by Dominic West) and Bunk Moreland (Wendell Pierce). The clips aired after Season 5 episodes as they premiered starting January 6, 2008.

=== Locations ===
At that Night at the Wire event, fans were allowed to tour the Baltimore Sun newsroom constructed for the show. The real newspaper allowed the show to use their name but stipulated that no current employees could appear in the series. The newsroom was an entirely built set constructed at the show's out-of-town soundstage.

The actual Washington Post newsroom was also featured, as one reporter visits for an interview. The Wire is the first production to be allowed to film at the location; even the film All the President's Men about the paper's role in breaking the Watergate scandal had to build a set to represent the paper.

=== Cast ===
New starring cast member Clark Johnson as editor Augustus "Gus" Haynes.

It was rumored in August 2007 that Homicide: Life on the Street stars Richard Belzer and Clark Johnson would guest star in the fifth season. Johnson was later confirmed as joining the starring cast to play Gus Haynes, "a city editor who tries to hold the line against dwindling coverage, buyouts, and pseudo-news."The New Yorker described an early scene from the season where Haynes rants about a reporter inserting a charred doll into scenes of fires to eke more sympathy from his readers. Johnson also directed the final episode of the show. In the episode "Took," Belzer made a cameo appearance as John Munch, the police detective he had portrayed since 1993 on Homicide: Life on the Street (1993–1999) and Law & Order: Special Victims Unit (1999–2013).

The majority of the starring cast from the fourth season returned. On the police front, Dominic West returned as Jimmy McNulty with a larger storyline than the fourth season; John Doman as Deputy Commissioner William Rawls; Seth Gilliam as Western district Sergeant Ellis Carver; Corey Parker Robinson as Major Case Unit detective Leander Sydnor; Deirdre Lovejoy as prosecutor Rhonda Pearlman; Clarke Peters as veteran Detective Lester Freamon; Wendell Pierce as veteran homicide Detective Bunk Moreland; Lance Reddick as Colonel Cedric Daniels; and Sonja Sohn as Detective Kima Greggs.

In the political storyline, Aidan Gillen returned as ambitious Mayor Tommy Carcetti; as well as Reg E. Cathey as political aide Norman Wilson; and Domenick Lombardozzi as troubled defense investigator Thomas "Herc" Hauk.

In the street, Jamie Hector returned as West-side drug kingpin Marlo Stanfield. Also returning for the street storyline were Andre Royo as heroin addict Bubbles; and Michael K. Williams as underworld legend Omar Little.

Former recurring characters who joined the main cast were Tristan Wilds as Michael Lee, Gbenga Akinnagbe as Chris Partlow, Jermaine Crawford as Duquan "Dukie" Weems, Isiah Whitlock, Jr. as corrupt State Senator Clay Davis, Michael Kostroff as defense attorney Maurice Levy, and Neal Huff as Mayoral chief of staff Michael Steintorf.

In addition to Johnson, joining the main cast in the journalism story line were Tom McCarthy as morally challenged reporter Scott Templeton and Michelle Paress as reporter Alma Gutierrez.

Season 4 main cast members Frankie Faison, Jim True-Frost, Robert Wisdom, and Chad L. Coleman, who played Ervin Burrell, Roland "Prez" Pryzbylewski, Howard "Bunny" Colvin and Dennis "Cutty" Wise, respectively, had recurring but not starring roles in the season.

Other returning guest stars included Steve Earle as drug counsellor Walon; Anwan Glover as Slim Charles; Robert F. Chew as drug kingpin Proposition Joe; Method Man as drug lieutenant Melvin "Cheese" Wagstaff; Felicia Pearson as the eponymous criminal enforcer Felicia "Snoop" Pearson; Chris Ashworth as former enforcer for the Greeks Sergei "Serge" Malatov; Wood Harris as fallen kingpin Avon Barksdale; Marlyne Afflack as city council president Nerese Campbell; and Amy Ryan as McNulty's domestic partner Beadie Russell. The return of guest stars from past seasons was described in reviews as a reward to loyal viewers.

New recurring guest stars included David Costabile, Sam Freed, Bruce Kirkpatrick, Todd Scofield, Kara Quick, and Donald Neal.

Continuing the show's trend of using non-professional actors and real-life Baltimore figures, several ex-Baltimore Sun reporters appeared in recurring roles. The editor character Rebecca Corbett, played by actress Kara Quick, was named after and based on Simon's former editor at the Baltimore Sun who now works at The New York Times; the real Rebecca Corbett has a cameo near the end of the series. Writer and former political reporter William F. Zorzi gained further screen time after his season 1 cameo.

Steve Luxenberg, the editor responsible for hiring Simon at The Sun, also had a role. Simon's wife Laura Lippman also appeared as a reporter in an early scene alongside Michael Olesker, another former Sun reporter. Baltimore attorney Billy Murphy appeared as a lawyer for corrupt Senator Clay Davis, and former senator and current radio host Larry Young conducted a fictional interview with the character. Former police commissioner Ed Norris returned in his recurring role as a homicide detective with the same name.

==== Main cast ====
- Dominic West as Jimmy McNulty (10 episodes), an intelligent but egotistical BPD homicide detective who comes up with an outlandish plan to secure department funding.
- Reg E. Cathey as Norman Wilson (10 episodes), Carcetti's aide who is left disillusioned after he prioritizes running for governor over helping Baltimore.
- John Doman as William Rawls (9 episodes), the BPD's deputy commissioner.
- Aidan Gillen as Thomas "Tommy" Carcetti (10 episodes), Baltimore's mayor who is forced to choose between furthering his political ambitions or helping the city.
- Clark Johnson as Augustus "Gus" Haynes (10 episodes), a principled Baltimore Sun city editor who grows suspicious of Templeton's reporting.
- Deirdre Lovejoy as Rhonda Pearlman (9 episodes), the deputy chief prosecutor of the BPD's violent crimes unit and Daniels's partner.
- Tom McCarthy as Scott Templeton (10 episodes), a Baltimore Sun reporter who has a habit of embellishing and fabricating details of his stories.
- Clarke Peters as Lester Freamon (10 episodes), an intelligent BPD major crimes detective who pursues Marlo, Davis, and department funding.
- Wendell Pierce as William "Bunk" Moreland (10 episodes), an intelligent BPD homicide detective who looks for ways to connect Marlo to a murder.
- Lance Reddick as Cedric Daniels (9 episodes), a BPD commander who Carcetti has his eye on to succeed Burrell.
- Andre Royo as Reginald "Bubbles" Cousins (6 episodes), a friendly former heroin addict who struggles to make peace with his checkered past.
- Sonja Sohn as Shakima "Kima" Greggs (10 episodes), a BPD homicide detective who tries to reconnect with her young son.
- Seth Gilliam as Ellis Carver (7 episodes), a principled BPD sergeant.
- Domenick Lombardozzi as Thomas "Herc" Hauk (5 episodes), a former BPD sergeant who now works as an investigator for Levy.
- Michael K. Williams as Omar Little (6 episodes), an extremely dangerous robber who is forced out of retirement by the death of a friend.
- Gbenga Akinnagbe as Christopher "Chris" Partlow (9 episodes), Marlo's quiet, ruthless underboss.
- Jamie Hector as Marlo Stanfield (9 episodes), a drug kingpin that seeks revenge on his enemies now that he is fully in power.
- Neal Huff as Michael Steintorf (9 episodes), Carcetti's chief of staff who is most concerned with the budget and statistics of City Hall.
- Jermaine Crawford as Duquan "Dukie" Weems (8 episodes), Michael's intelligent friend who finds himself out of place in the Stanfield Organization.
- Corey Parker Robinson as Leander Sydnor (9 episodes), an ambitious BPD major crimes detective who works to crack the code Marlo communicates to his dealers with.
- Tristan Wilds as Michael Lee (9 episodes), a young Stanfield Organization soldier who begins to doubt Marlo's leadership.
- Michael Kostroff as Maurice Levy (5 episodes), Marlo's defense attorney who has an illegal way to help his clients avoid prosecution.
- Michelle Paress as Alma Gutierrez (10 episodes), an ambitious Baltimore Sun reporter who catches Haynes's attention with her skills.
- Isiah Whitlock Jr. as Clayton "Clay" Davis (7 episodes), a corrupt state senator being investigated for his various financial crimes.

=== Crew ===
Creator David Simon continued to act as the show's executive producer and show runner. Nina Kostroff Noble once again served as the show's other executive producer. Joe Chappelle reprised his co-executive producer role and continued to direct episodes. Ed Burns once again served as a writer and joined Chappelle as a co-executive producer. Karen L. Thorson returned as a producer. George Pelecanos produced the sixth episode of the series only - his first production work since the third season.

Political journalist William F. Zorzi continued to write for the show and guide the political storylines. Acclaimed crime fiction novelist Pelecanos returned as a writer and contributed his seventh episode to the series. Pelecanos's fellow crime novelists Richard Price and Dennis Lehane also returned as writers. Chris Collins returned as a staff writer and contributed his first script. David Mills contributed an episode, completing the writing team.

New star Clark Johnson also helmed the final episode after previously directing the pilot. Other returning directors for the fifth season included Ernest Dickerson, Anthony Hemingway, Agnieszka Holland, Dan Attias, and Seith Mann. Series star Dominic West made his directorial debut. Husband and wife directing team Scott and Joy Kecken were also first time directors on the fifth season.

== Reception ==
The fifth season received widespread acclaim from critics, scoring 89 out of 100 based on 24 reviews on Metacritic. On Rotten Tomatoes, the season has an approval rating of 93% with an average score of 9.8/10 based on 44 reviews. The website's critical consensus reads, "The Wire goes out with a suitably resonant bang in its final season, craftily maneuvering venturesome motifs and a colorful cast of characters to skillfully understated conclusion."

Matt Roush of TV Guide favorably reviewed the series calling it "brilliantly bleak" and a "landmark series." Brian Lowry of Variety characterized the series' look at the media as the most realistic portrayal of a newsroom in film and television history.

However, Leigh Claire La Berge found that "in the popular press [...] the level of critical anticipation that greeted that season was matched only by the immediate disappointment that followed it", noting that the season is The Wire's most explicitly didactic, the one that most obviously comments on the series's own fictionality, and the one with the least realistic plot. Thus in reviewing the first seven episodes of the fifth season David Zurawik of the Baltimore Sun said that while "there is greatness in the seven episodes," the major newspaper storyline "contain[s] nothing that matches the emotional power and sociological insight of the show at its best." La Berge argued that it is precisely the fifth season's capacity to explore the social construction of realism itself that is the season's most important characteristic.

=== Awards and nominations ===
60th Primetime Emmy Awards

- Nomination for Outstanding Writing for a Drama Series (Ed Burns & David Simon) (Episode: "–30–")

Writers Guild of America Awards

- Nomination for Best Drama Series

24th TCA Awards

- Award for Heritage Award
- Nomination for Program of the Year
- Nomination for Outstanding Achievement in Drama
- Nomination for Outstanding Individual Achievement in Drama (David Simon)

== Episodes ==
All episodes except "-30-" were made available by HBO six days earlier than their broadcast date, via On Demand.

No. overall	No. in season	Title	Directed by	Written by	Original release date	U.S. viewers (millions)
51	1	"More with Less"	Joe Chappelle	Story by : David Simon & Ed Burns; Teleplay by : David Simon	January 6, 2008	1.23
Epigraph: "The bigger the lie, the more they believe." -Bunk Chris gets Serge Malatov's (Note: An incarcerated lieutenant for "The Greek", a former Baltimore crime boss, first seen in "Ebb Tide".) picture from courthouse files. Dukie fails to get respect from a crew Michael gives him, who asks him to focus on watching Bug Manigault. As the Baltimore Sun faces budget cuts, Bubbles, sober and living in Rae's (Note: Bubbles's estranged and mistrustful sister, first seen in "Game Day".) basement again, works as a distributor for it. Carcetti refuses the Republican U.S. attorney's offer to assist with an investigation into Davis. His attempts to fund the school system causes budget issues in the BPD, shutting down the major crimes unit and the investigation of the vacant murders. (Note: As depicted in "Final Grades".) Freamon and Sydnor are given the Davis detail, while McNulty falls back into infidelity and alcoholism.
52	2	"Unconfirmed Reports"	Ernest Dickerson	Story by : David Simon & William F. Zorzi; Teleplay by : William F. Zorzi	January 13, 2008	1.19
Epigraph: "This ain't Aruba, bitch." -Bunk Bubbles regularly attends NA meetings but is unable to talk about Sherrod's death. (Note: As depicted in "That's Got His Own".) Sun reporter Scott Templeton cuts corners on a piece, but the lead editor is impressed regardless and ignores city editor Gus Haynes's concerns. Carcetti commits to running for governor, unable to fix Baltimore's problems without asking for help from the current one. Avon refuses to let Marlo see Serge until he gives money to Brianna Barksdale. After doing so, Marlo convinces Serge to put him in contact with Vondas. He has a rumor-spreading dealer killed in his home by Chris and Snoop Pearson. Michael is disturbed and lets a child escape the scene, while Greggs finds a second child, Devonne, hiding in a closet. Unable to get federal backing for the Stanfield investigation, McNulty manipulates the scene of an overdose, plotting to fabricate a serial killer that preys on the homeless to get funding sent to the BPD.
53	3	"Not for Attribution"	Scott Kecken & Joy Kecken	Story by : David Simon & Chris Collins; Teleplay by : Chris Collins	January 20, 2008	0.85
Epigraph: "They're dead where it doesn't count." -Fletcher McNulty contacts Sun reporter Alma Gutierrez, but the story is only given a small piece. Bunk tries to get Freamon to talk sense into McNulty, but he instead agrees with the idea. He and Sydnor discover that Davis committed a federal crime by lying on a mortgage application. Burrell shows Carcetti crime stats that Stan Valchek reveals are doctored, giving Carcetti cause to fire him. He plans to replace him with Daniels, which a disillusioned Wilson leaks to his friend Haynes. Templeton spitefully publishes a quote that frames Daniels as betraying Burrell when another reporter is given the story. Damien Price (Note: Davis's driver who would move dirty money on his behalf, first seen in "One Arrest".) testifies against Davis before a grand jury. Dukie persuades a depressed Michael to go to Six Flags America with him and Bug, but he is berated by Monk Metcalf for leaving when he returns. Vondas tells Marlo to clean his money if they do business, so Joe Stewart points him to the Antilles for laundering. Cheese Wagstaff gives up Butchie, (Note: Omar's close friend and confidant, first seen in "Hot Shots".) who Chris tortures and kills to lure out Omar.
54	4	"Transitions"	Dan Attias	Story by : David Simon & Ed Burns; Teleplay by : Ed Burns	January 27, 2008	1.28
Epigraph: "Buyer's market out there." -Templeton A BPD officer assaults a civilian after being humiliated by Kenard (Note: Michael's young dealer, first seen in "Dead Soldiers".) and Carver decides to charge him when he expresses no regret. The state's attorney decides to charge Davis locally. Burrell uses his knowledge on Daniels's FBI file to get a lucrative job, smugly revealing he had forgotten much of the contents as Rawls is temporarily promoted in his stead. McNulty and Russell fight, interrupted when Freamon's old partner calls him to report a dead homeless man, who McNulty and Freamon bite with dentures to invent a sexual deviance angle. After watching an unsuccessful interview with a traumatized Devonne, Greggs spends time and eventually bonds with Elijah. (Note: Greggs's young son, first seen in "All Due Respect".) Marlo gives Cheese his New Day Co-Op rival to kill. Joe tells Slim Charles that he suspects Cheese gave Butchie up. Vondas insists on primarily doing business with Joe, so Cheese gives him to Marlo and he is killed.
55	5	"React Quotes"	Agnieszka Holland	Story by : David Simon & David Mills; Teleplay by : David Mills	February 3, 2008	0.53
Epigraph: "Just cause they're in the street doesn't mean that they lack opinions." -Haynes Vondas gives Marlo a phone as he takes over for Joe. He gives the number to his attorney Levy, and Herc, working as Levy's investigator, jots it down. Omar breaks into Monk's apartment but is ambushed by Stanfield men, jumping from a balcony to escape. Bubbles is upset when he tests negative for HIV, feeling he deserves worse. Davis begins a campaign to frame his charges as racially motivated. McNulty tells Gutierrez about the bites and her story draws more attention to the case. He and Freamon fake a phone call from the killer, and the story makes the front page when Templeton fakes his own call. Carver receives Marlo's number and passes it to Freamon, who obtains a wiretap on the killer and uses it on Marlo instead when Daniels refuses to pursue him.
56	6	"The Dickensian Aspect"	Seith Mann	Story by : David Simon & Ed Burns; Teleplay by : Ed Burns	February 10, 2008	0.74
Epigraph: "If you have a problem with this, I understand completely." -Freamon Omar sets his broken leg and burns one of Marlo's money stashes. Marlo disbands the Co-Op and gives Cheese his rival's territory. Trying to get Marlo on a murder, Bunk interviews Michael's mother, who tells him that Chris was involved in Devar Manigualt's death. (Note: As depicted in "Misgivings".) Stolen indictments turn up in Joe's shop. Carcetti publicly pledges to help the homeless, which Wilson and Steintorf suggest he could run for governor on. Templeton's article is a national success, so he interviews homeless veteran Terry Hanning for a follow-up. Finding it difficult to stage bodies with increased police activity, McNulty accosts a homeless man named Larry Butler, photographs him, and plots a narrative where the killer sends photos of his victims to the press and hides the bodies. He sends Larry to a shelter in Richmond to fake his death.
57	7	"Took"	Dominic West	Story by : David Simon & Richard Price; Teleplay by : Richard Price	February 17, 2008	0.57
Epigraph: "They don't teach it in law school." -Pearlman McNulty calls Templeton through the wire and sells the new narrative while posing as the killer. Freamon pulls messages from Marlo's phone and finds images of clock faces sent with a number. Davis charms the jury into an acquittal despite more damning testimony from Price. Haynes sends reporter Mike Fletcher to canvas the homeless, where he meets Bubbles. Omar robs a stash house and kills Savino Bratton, (Note: A former Barksdale soldier, first seen in "The Target".) who is out of jail and working for Marlo. He approaches Marlo's younger dealers, amongst them Kenard, and warns them that he will keep killing Stanfields until Marlo meets him in person. Greggs, having taken Elijah for the night, tenderly reads to him when he cannot sleep.
58	8	"Clarifications"	Anthony Hemingway	Story by : David Simon & Dennis Lehane; Teleplay by : Dennis Lehane	February 24, 2008	N/A
Epigraph: "A lie ain't a side of a story. It's just a lie." -Terry Hanning McNulty travels to Quantico for FBI assistance in the case and is unsettled by their profile of the killer mirroring him. He admits the truth to Greggs and Russell. Bunk runs the DNA on Devar's body and matches it to Chris. Sydnor realizes that the page numbers of a street atlas match the message numbers and the clock hands are Cartesian coordinates that mark a meeting's location. Carcetti gives half of Baltimore's federal funding to Prince George's County for support in the gubernatorial primary. Terry confronts Haynes and Templeton on inaccuracies in the latter's story. Haynes tries to cut the lead paragraph in Templeton's new story, but is stopped by the managing editor. He is impressed with Fletcher's report on Bubbles and tells him to talk to him again. Dukie looks for a job but can only find work helping a junk collector. Kenard notices Omar disrupting Marlo's corners and kills him when his back is turned.
59	9	"Late Editions"	Joe Chappelle	Story by : David Simon & George Pelecanos; Teleplay by : George Pelecanos	March 2, 2008	0.71
Epigraph: "Deserve got nuthin' to do with it." -Snoop The Stanfields are arrested after Monk is caught at a deal, while Chris is arrested for Devar's murder. Marlo suspects Michael's involvement due to his recent hesitance and orders him killed. Carcetti approaches Colvin at a student debate where he is proudly watching Namond Brice speak, and is ignored when he tries to apologize about not supporting the free zone project. (Note: As depicted in season 3.) Freamon blackmails Davis with the mortgage into giving up a courthouse worker that sells information to Levy. Herc intuits while talking to Carver that Marlo was arrested using a wire, which he relays to Levy. Haynes grows suspicious when Daniels refuses to talk to Gutierrez due to Templeton's quoting. He visits WRAMC and confirms with Terry's friend that Templeton lied in his story. Fletcher accompanies Bubbles to NA for his anniversary of sobriety where he finally tells Sherrod's story, though he leaves out his culpability in his death. Greggs reports McNulty's scheme to Daniels after a homeless man turns up murdered. He visits the evidence room and finds the killer's phone is actually Marlo's. Snoop tries to lure Michael to his death, but he ambushes and kills her. He gives Bug money and sends him to his aunt, then drops Dukie off with the junk man for his safety. Dukie asks if he remembers their water balloon escapade, (Note: As depicted in "Boys of Summer".) to which he responds "I don't" before leaving.
60	10	"-30-"	Clark Johnson	Story by : David Simon & Ed Burns; Teleplay by : David Simon	March 9, 2008	1.10
Epigraph: "...the life of kings." -H.L. Mencken Another man is murdered and McNulty catches the perpetrator—another homeless man—who is framed as the killer. He and Freamon are fired, though the latter identifies the leak and points Pearlman to Levy. Levy gets Marlo freed because of the wire, but on the condition that the rest stay in jail and he stays out of the drug game. An enraged Sydnor breaks chain of command by going to Daniel Phelan. (Note: A judge who used to be friends with McNulty, first seen in "The Target".) (Note: A reference to "The Target", where McNulty broke chain of command with Phelan to get the Barksdales investigated.) Marlo gets in a fight with dealers rather than let Levy introduce him to developers. Carcetti becomes governor and Rawls is promoted, leaving Daniels to become commissioner under new mayor Nerese Campbell. (Note: Baltimore's former city council president who was initially promised the position of mayor after Royce, first seen in "Boys of Summer".) He refuses to doctor stats and is served his FBI file, so he resigns after promoting Carver to major crimes lieutenant and becomes an attorney while Pearlman becomes a judge. Valchek takes his place. Templeton fakes a story and wins a Pulitzer Prize, while Gutierrez is transferred. Haynes is demoted but is happy to see Fletcher in his place for his moving story on Bubbles, who is invited upstairs to eat with Rae. Dukie asks Prez for money to enroll in a GED program, who warns him their friendship is over if he is lying. He later sees Dukie giving it to the junk man, who he starts using heroin with. Michael robs Marlo's advisor and Kenard is arrested for Omar's murder. Charles kills Cheese for his role in Joe's murder and starts business with Vondas. Having healed his relationship with Russell, McNulty takes Larry back to Baltimore, stopping and contemplating the city as a montage reveals the characters' fates. After a moment, he tells Larry "let's go home" before driving off. The episode is dedicated to Robert F. Colesberry, the show's co-creator and Ray Cole's actor, who died between the second and third season.
