= More with Less =

- The Wire episode
- Episode no.: Season 5 Episode 1
- Directed by: Joe Chappelle
- Story by: David Simon; Ed Burns
- Teleplay by: David Simon
- Original air date: January 6, 2008
- Running time: 58 minutes

Episode chronology
← Previous "Final Grades"	Next → "Unconfirmed Reports"

"More with Less" is the first episode of the fifth season of the HBO original series The Wire. The episode was written by David Simon from a story by David Simon & Ed Burns and was directed by Joe Chappelle. It originally aired on January 6, 2008.

== Plot ==
The bigger the lie, the more they believe.

— Bunk, in More with Less

Mayor Tommy Carcetti's plan to rejuvenate the Baltimore Police Department has been halted by funding cuts necessitated by the city's education deficit. Carcetti and Council President Nerese Campbell meet with a Republican U.S. Attorney who promises to lend a dozen FBI agents to the BPD in exchange for the city allowing the investigation into the corrupt State Senator Clay Davis to be made a federal case. Carcetti fears that the U.S. Attorney will use the case to discredit the Democrats, while Campbell sees State's Attorney Rupert Bond's case against Davis as a means of eventually running for mayor. Carcetti's cuts cause the Major Crimes Unit (MCU) to shut down, effectively ending the investigation into the vacant murders. Detectives Lester Freamon and Leander Sydnor take over the Davis investigation.

Colonel Cedric Daniels is outraged that City Hall is prioritizing Davis over 22 murders. Detective Jimmy McNulty, having already fallen back into his old habits of alcoholism and infidelity while working in the MCU, is despondent upon his return to Homicide. In the Western District, Sergeant Ellis Carver struggles to keep up morale following pay cuts. Herc is now working as an investigator for defense attorney Maurice Levy. Marlo Stanfield intimidates other drug dealers into buying his product and causes unrest in the New Day Co-Op. He gets Chris Partlow to find Sergei Malatov as a connection to the Co-Ops' suppliers. Partlow visits the courthouse, where he unwittingly approaches Daniels, Bond, and Rhonda Pearlman to ask for directions. Michael Lee is acting as an enforcer under Partlow, while his friend and cohabitant Duquan "Dukie" Weems runs their drug dealing crew. Dukie has not gained the respect of the crew, and Michael suggests paying him for looking after his younger brother Bug instead.

The Baltimore Sun also faces budget cuts, but editor Augustus "Gus" Haynes remains principled and efficient. The Sun breaks a story about Campbell's relocation of drug dealer Ricardo "Fat-Face Rick" Hendrix's strip club out of a redeveloping neighborhood at a considerable cost to the city budget, linking the plan to campaign contributions from Hendrix and Campbell's associates. Ambitious reporter Scott Templeton remains dissatisfied while his colleague Alma Gutierrez, who got a choice quote from Hendrix for the story, is happy with her work. Bubbles lives in his sister's basement and no longer uses drugs, but leaves each evening that his sister is assigned to night shift, as she does not trust him enough to leave him alone in her house. He works as a rush hour distributor for the Sun to commuters. He sells a copy to Campbell, who is outraged by the Hendrix story.

== Production ==
=== Guest stars ===
- Frankie Faison as Ervin Burrell
- Amy Ryan as Beatrice "Beadie" Russell
- Marlyne Afflack as Nerese Campbell
- Robert F. Chew as Proposition Joe
- Delaney Williams as Jay Landsman
- Felicia Pearson as Felicia "Snoop" Pearson
- Duane Rawlings as Hungry Man
- Troj Marquis Strickland as Ricardo "Fatface Rick" Hendrix
- Anwan Glover as Slim Charles
- David Costabile as Thomas Klebanow
- Sam Freed as James Whiting
- Dion Graham as Rupert Bond
- Bruce Kirkpatrick as Roger Twigg
- Jay Landsman as Dennis Mello
- Ed Norris as Ed Norris
- Method Man as Melvin "Cheese" Wagstaff
- Joseph Urla as Maryland District US Attorney
- Gregory L. Williams as Michael Crutchfield
- William F. Zorzi as Bill Zorzi
- Bobby J. Brown as Bobby Brown
- Benjamin Busch as Anthony Colicchio
- Rick Otto as Kenneth Dozerman
- Ryan Sands as Lloyd "Truck" Garrick
- Ron Tucker as Unknown
- Thomas J. McCarthy as Tim Phelps
- Donald Neal as Jay Spry
- Robert Poletick as Steven Luxenberg
- Kara Quick as Rebecca Corbett
- Todd Scofield as Jeff Price
- Eisa Davis as Bubbles' Sister
- Gil Deeble as Hucklebuck
- Edward Green as Spider
- Dante Painter, Jr. as DeShawn
- Corbin Smith as Monell
- Peter Linari as Pete the Bartender
- Laura Lippman as Laura Lippman
- Michael Olesker as Michael Olesker
- Gene Terinoni as Jimmy Asher
- Brandon Young as Mike Fletcher
- Lee Everett Cox as Aaron Castor
- Dennis Hill as Detective Christeson
- Juhahn Jones as Drug Dealer
- Brian E. McLarney as Officer Brian McLarney
- Jermaine Shorts as Unknown
- Jay Spadaro as Officer

Lee Everett Cox and David Costabile's names are misspelled in the credits as Lee Evertt Cox and David Costible, respectively.

=== Uncredited appearances ===
- Mike D. Anderson as Ghost
- Keenon Brice as Bug
- Darrell Britt-Gibson as O-Dog
- Chris Clanton as Savino Bratton
- Thuliso Dingwall as Kenard

=== First appearances ===
- Gus Haynes - a veteran of The Baltimore Sun and city desk editor
- Scott Templeton - reporter
- Alma Gutierrez - reporter
- James Whiting - the paper's Executive Editor
- Thomas Klebanow - the paper's Managing Editor
- Steven Luxenberg - the paper's Metro Desk Editor
- Tim Phelps - the paper's State Desk Editor
- Rebecca Corbett - the paper's Regional Affairs Editor
- Jay Spry - veteran rewrite man
- Roger Twigg - long-serving reporter
- Mike Fletcher - young general assignments reporter
- Det. Christeson - new member of the homicide unit who has McNulty's old desk
