= Unconfirmed Reports =

- The Wire episode
- Episode no.: Season 5 Episode 2
- Directed by: Ernest Dickerson
- Story by: David Simon; William F. Zorzi
- Teleplay by: William F. Zorzi
- Original air date: January 13, 2008
- Running time: 58 minutes

Episode chronology
← Previous "More with Less"	Next → "Not for Attribution"

"Unconfirmed Reports" is the second episode of the fifth season of the HBO original series The Wire. The episode was written by William F. Zorzi from a story by David Simon & William F. Zorzi and was directed by Ernest Dickerson. It originally aired on January 13, 2008.

== Plot ==
This ain't Aruba, bitch.

— Bunk, in Unconfirmed Reports

At a Narcotics Anonymous meeting, Bubbles follows a speaker named Dee-Dee who discusses her struggle with her inner addict and personal code. Bubbles is engaging and humorous, but unable to discuss an emotional memory. Walon tries to convince him to share the tragedy of Sherrod's death in order to move on, and persuades him to fill his time by volunteering at a soup kitchen. At The Baltimore Sun, Templeton plans a color piece about the Baltimore Orioles opening game, but fails to find a suitable subject. He returns with an unverifiable story about an orphaned wheelchair user truanting to attend. Gus is concerned about the piece's lack of corroboration, but is forced to print it after executive editor James Whiting gives his approval. Later, desk editor Rebecca Corbett also questions the authenticity of the story, but Gus tells her there's nothing he can do.

Marlo decides to reassert his authority and orders several murders. Partlow, Snoop, and Michael watch the house of a target named June Bug, who has spread rumors that Marlo is homosexual. Michael questions the necessity of the murder of an entire family for a possible insult, but is admonished by Snoop for second-guessing Marlo. Partlow and Snoop disable the street's security cameras, stage a home invasion, and kill the three adults inside. Michael lets a child escape and is disgusted by the entire operation. Later, Detective Kima Greggs finds a second child hiding in the home. She picks up the child and leaves the building. Marlo visits Serge in prison and finds Avon Barksdale waiting in his place. Avon tells Marlo that in order for him to talk to Serge, he has to give Avon's sister Brianna $100,000. Marlo agrees and convinces Serge to give him a line to Spiros Vondas.

Commissioner Ervin Burrell struggles to meet Mayor Carcetti's crime reduction target while implementing budget cuts. He alienates Senator Davis by refusing to interfere in his corruption case. Carcetti intends to run for governor despite the city's fiscal difficulties, which he accepts because he can't fix schooling and crime problems at the same time without asking for money from Annapolis. State Delegate Odell Watkins expresses disappointment in Carcetti's priorities. Freamon still works the Davis case, but also spends his own time watching known Stanfield meeting places. McNulty desperately wants to return to the Stanfield case and is increasingly frustrated in Homicide. Freamon and McNulty try to get federal support, but their proposal is shot down by the U.S. Attorney as retaliation against Carcetti for not allowing the Clay Davis case to go federal. The detectives bitterly drown their sorrows with Bunk Moreland afterward.

When McNulty and Bunk are assigned a probable overdose, McNulty begins drinking and deliberately stages the body and the scene to suggest that the victim was murdered. McNulty tells Bunk that he plans to create the illusion of a serial killer with the intent of compelling City Hall to better fund the BPD in response to public pressure. Bunk wants no part of it and leaves in disgust.

== Production ==
=== Guest stars ===
- Frankie Faison as Ervin Burrell
- Wood Harris as Avon Barksdale
- Steve Earle as Walon
- Felicia Pearson as Felicia "Snoop" Pearson
- Delaney Williams as Jay Landsman
- Chris Ashworth as Sergei Malatov
- Genevieve Hudson-Price as Dee-Dee
- Frederick Strother as Odell Watkins
- Benay Berger as Amanda Reese
- Doug Olear as Terrence "Fitz" Fitzhugh
- Joseph Urla as Maryland District US Attorney
- David Costabile as Thomas Klebanow
- Sam Freed as James Whiting
- Donald Neal as Jay Spry
- Bobby J. Brown as Bobby Brown
- Anthony Mangano as Kevin Infante
- Kristie Dale Sanders as Nancy Porter
- Gregory L. Williams as Michael Crutchfield
- Bruce Kirkpatrick as Roger Twigg
- Thomas J. McCarthy as Tim Phelps
- Kara Quick as Rebecca Corbett
- Todd Scofield as Jeff Price
- Darrell Britt-Gibson as O-Dog
- Kwame Patterson as Monk Metcalf
- Scott Shane as Scott Shane
- Suzanne Wooton as Suzanne Wooton
- Willa Bickham as Willa Bickham
- Dan Manning as Assistant Medical Examiner
- Kate Revelle as Jane
- Kelley Slagle as Assistant Medical Examiner
- Brendan Walsh as Brendan Walsh
- Erica Chamblee as Pregnant Mother
- Lee Everett Cox as Aaron Castor
- Rachel Lynn Dinenna as unknown
- Frank McPartland as Angry fan
- Andrew Roth as Tim Packard
- Tasha R. Rudolph as Abusive mother
- Andrew Cruttenden as unknown
- Ayoka Dorsey as Gus' wife
- Tyson Hall as Marvin
- Adrienne Meisel as Recovering addict
- Patricia Penn as Sun staff member
- Steve Zettler as Prison guard

=== Uncredited roles ===
- Curt Boushell as Andy, Sun copy editor
- Louis Stancil as Unknown corner boy
