= Took (The Wire) =

- The Wire episode
- Episode no.: Season 5 Episode 7
- Directed by: Dominic West
- Story by: David Simon; Richard Price
- Teleplay by: Richard Price
- Original air date: February 17, 2008
- Running time: 58 minutes

Episode chronology
← Previous "The Dickensian Aspect"	Next → "Clarifications"

"Took" is the seventh episode of the fifth season of the HBO original series The Wire. The episode was written by Richard Price from a story by David Simon & Richard Price and was directed by cast member Dominic West. It aired on February 17, 2008.

== Plot ==
They don't teach it in law school.

— Pearlman

McNulty, Freamon, and Sydnor plot to get Templeton to take a phone call from the "serial killer." McNulty, posing as the killer, acts upset about Templeton's articles painting him in a sexual light and says that no more bodies will be found in Baltimore; instead, he will simply send pictures of his victims. Both the BPD and The Baltimore Sun prioritize the serial killer and resolve to see the case to its end. Freamon, now able to intercept cell phone images via his illegal wiretap on Marlo, runs up against a tougher code than he expected – a simple clock face showing a different time in each picture – and he needs more manpower to determine what these messages mean. McNulty, knowing the serial killer case is a hoax, sends his surveillance teams to Freamon while allocating the extra manpower assigned to him to allow other detectives to earn their overtime pay. McNulty is overwhelmed as the bosses offer him more and more men. Eventually, the fact that he's giving away time gets out and people come looking for it.

Knowing the truth about McNulty's hoax, Bunk refuses to attend a mandatory meeting about the serial killer and instead goes back to investigating the vacant murders. Carver brings in Michael to let Bunk interview him about his stepfather. Omar robs a Stanfield stash house, killing a soldier and flushing several kilos of heroin. He later traps and executes Savino Bratton, now working for Marlo. Later, Omar tells Michael that he will take out all Marlo's muscle until Marlo comes at him himself. Gus consults his old friend, Major Dennis Mello, about whether someone can go through the court system with a false name. Mello's answer casts doubt on Templeton's reporting. Gus and Corbett show disgust at Templeton's maudlin story about living with the homeless. Gus sends Sun reporter Mike Fletcher to research the homeless, which leads Fletcher to Bubbles' soup kitchen. Bubbles guides Fletcher to the Jones Falls Expressway, where he talks to local homeless. When Fletcher offers to pay Bubbles, he turns him down and tells him to "write it how it feels".

Senator Davis hires high-powered attorney Billy Murphy Jr. Despite another round of incriminating testimony from Damien Price, Davis is able to charm the jury and present himself as a man of the people. To the shock of Bond and Pearlman, Davis is acquitted. Greggs, assigned to the homeless killings full-time, spends an entire day getting background information on the homeless victims. She plans to keep her ex-partner's son Elijah for the night. When Elijah can't sleep, Greggs sits with him in the apartment window and says goodnight to the denizens of the inner city à la Goodnight Moon.

== Production ==
=== Guest stars ===
- Peter Gerety as Judge Daniel Phelan
- David Costabile as Thomas Klebanow
- Sam Freed as James Whiting
- Delaney Williams as Jay Landsman
- Ed Norris as Ed Norris
- Gregory L. Williams as Michael Crutchfield
- Brian Anthony Wilson as Vernon Holley
- Kara Quick as Rebecca Corbett
- Brandon Young as Mike Fletcher
- William F. Zorzi as Bill Zorzi
- Dion Graham as Rupert Bond
- Billy Murphy Jr. as himself
- Donnell Rawlings as Damien "Day-Day" Price
- Richard Belzer as John Munch
- Thomas J. McCarthy as Tim Phelps
- Crissandra Spencer as Reporter
- Stanley Boyd as Cherry
- Christopher J. Clanton as Savino Bratton
- Edward Green as Spider
- Kwame Patterson as Monk Metcalf
- Thuliso Dingwall as Kenard
- James Jorsling as Vincent
- Jay Landsman as Dennis Mello
- Michael Salconi as Michael Santangelo
- Curt Boushell as Andy
- David Goodman as Budget Advisor
- Dennis Hill as Detective Christeson
- Elijah Grant Johnson as Elijah
- Kim Tuvin as Judge Emily Johnson
- Stu Evered as Detective
- Seymour Horowitz as Father
- Rosemary Knower as Mother
- Ken Ulman as Reporter Ken Ullman
- Vickie Warehime as Patrol Sergeant

Stanley Boyd's name is misspelled in the credits as Stanely Boyd.

==== Uncredited appearances ====
- Michael Stone Forrest as Frank Barlow
- Derek Horton as Brian Baker
- Todd Scofield as Jeff Price

== Special appearance ==
Richard Belzer makes a cameo appearance as former Baltimore police detective John Munch, the character he portrayed on the Baltimore-based police drama Homicide: Life on the Street (1993–1999), and subsequently on the New York-based Law & Order: Special Victims Unit (1999–2014). Clark Johnson's character, Augustus Haynes, walks into a bar to speak with Major Dennis Mello, played by Jay Landsman (the John Munch character was based upon Landsman from David Simon's non-fiction book Homicide: A Year on the Killing Streets). On Homicide, Johnson's character Meldrick Lewis owned a Baltimore bar with Munch. As Haynes walks past him, Munch can be heard telling the bartender that he cannot ask a regular to pay his entire outstanding tab as "it just isn't done" and adds that he once owned a bar. As the audio of their conversation fades, the bartender can be faintly heard saying "Whatever, John."
