= Clarifications (The Wire) =

- The Wire episode
- Episode no.: Season 5 Episode 8
- Directed by: Anthony Hemingway
- Story by: David Simon; Dennis Lehane
- Teleplay by: Dennis Lehane
- Original air date: February 24, 2008
- Running time: 58 minutes

Episode chronology
← Previous "Took"	Next → "Late Editions"

"Clarifications" is the eighth episode of the fifth season of the HBO original series The Wire. The episode was written by Dennis Lehane from a story by David Simon and Dennis Lehane and was directed by Anthony Hemingway. It aired on February 24, 2008.

== Plot ==
Michael informs Partlow and Snoop about his confrontation with Omar. Soon afterwards, Omar goes to a corner store and is killed by Kenard. At a COMSTAT meeting, McNulty updates his superiors and Mayor Carcetti on the "serial killer" case. Carcetti approves McNulty's request to let Carver join the investigation. Carver quickly deduces that Freamon is running a wiretap. While Carver assembles surveillance teams, McNulty helps Bunk take a request for DNA matching to the crime lab.

McNulty arrives home to find that Beadie has left a note saying she is not sure when she and her children will return. When McNulty and Greggs travel to Quantico, Virginia, to get FBI assistance, he is disturbed when the Bureau's psychological profile of the supposed serial killer reflects his own personality. Back in Baltimore, Bunk finds himself investigating Omar's murder and realizes from a hit list that he was hunting Marlo's crew, with Savino's name the only one crossed out. Bunk delivers the list to McNulty, and reluctantly agrees to hold back on a murder warrant for Partlow so that Freamon can make a break in the Stanfield investigation. McNulty pulls Greggs into an interview room and comes clean about fabricating the case. Greggs tells McNulty he cannot carry on with his plan, but McNulty tries to reassure her that it will all be over soon. Beadie eventually returns with her children and confronts McNulty, prompting him to confess to her as well. Freamon intercepts a coded message from Marlo to organize a meeting with Partlow.

Freamon meets with the U.S. Attorney with the evidence from the Davis investigation, hoping to take the case federal now that local prosecution has failed. The U.S. Attorney refuses to take the case, since Davis is now a martyr to the black community. Freamon later tracks Davis to a bar and threatens him with the prospect of a new case at the federal level. Davis assumes Freamon is trying to blackmail him for money, to which Freamon instead demands answers.

When McNulty hands Freamon Omar's hit list, he recognizes Cheese's name. While tracking Marlo, Sydnor decodes the clock messages as codes for the Cartesian coordinates of the location on each page of a street atlas. Sydnor is perplexed that the code gives only a location and not a time to meet, and Freamon postulates that the meetings happen within an hour. Freamon guesses that Cheese is involved in the East Side meetings. Elsewhere, Dukie goes into a sporting goods store to seek a job from retired dealer Malik "Poot" Carr, who recommends that Dukie go back to the street and apply for a job when he is older. Dukie leaves the store and helps a junk man, who offers more work for Dukie the next day.

To deflect from his weakness on crime in the upcoming campaign, Mayor Carcetti and Steintorf decide to use the serial killings to attack the governor for cutting funds to homeless programs. Wilson learns that the mayor is facing a primary challenger named Dobey. Carcetti and Wilson drive to Prince George's County to persuade Congressman Upshaw, who is considering supporting Dobey, to remain in his camp. He then meets with Senator Davis and Campbell and makes concessions to them in exchange for their support. At a homeless vigil, Carcetti gives a rousing speech as Campbell, Wilson and Steintorf look on approvingly. Upon returning home, he complains to his wife Jen about the compromises he has been forced to make, revealing that Upshaw demanded that half of Baltimore's federal funding be allocated to his county. Jen objects, but Carcetti rationalizes that if he does not get elected, Baltimore will get nothing.

At The Baltimore Sun, Gus arranges a face-to-face meeting between Templeton and Terry, who angrily accuses the former of falsifying their discussion. Gus informs Templeton that they will investigate the complaint, but that a correction will be printed if more details are found to be incorrect. Gus, intrigued by Fletcher's story about Bubbles, asks Fletcher to see what comes of spending more time with him. He cuts the lede from Templeton's story on the homeless vigil for including an unsourced anecdote. Templeton angrily turns to Klebanow, who questions Gus's decision. Gus defends his adherence to the newspaper's standards and leaves the newsroom.

== Production ==
=== Title reference ===
The title refers to Haynes telling Templeton that he may have to submit a clarifications and corrections piece for Templeton's embellishing of Hanning's story. It may also refer to McNulty coming clean about his ruse. Additionally, the title refers to the mixed up identity tags on the bodies of Omar Little and the middle aged white man in the body bag next to his. The morgue attendant rectifies this by switching them back.

=== Epigraph ===
A lie ain't a side of a story. It's just a lie.

— Terry Hanning

Homeless Marine veteran Terry Hanning says this as a rebuttal to journalist Scott Templeton while they're arguing, cutting each other off, and Templeton wants to tell "[his] side of the story."

=== Credits ===
==== Starring cast ====
Although credited, Deirdre Lovejoy, Andre Royo, Domenick Lombardozzi, and Michael Kostroff do not appear in this episode.

==== Guest stars ====
- Amy Ryan as Beatrice "Beadie" Russell
- Tray Chaney as Malik "Poot" Carr
- Felicia Pearson as Felicia "Snoop" Pearson
- Marlyne Afflack as Nerese Campbell
- Megan Anderson as Jen Carcetti
- Benay Berger as Amanda Reese
- Doug Olear as Terrance "Fitz" Fitzhugh
- Joseph Urla as Maryland District US Attorney
- David Costabile as Thomas Klebanow
- Todd Scofield as Jeff Price
- Brandon Young as Mike Fletcher
- Michael Stone Forrest as Frank Barlow
- Ed Norris as Ed Norris
- Gregory L. Williams as Michael Crutchfield
- Bobby Brown as Bobby Brown
- Rick Otto as Kenneth Dozerman
- Ryan Sands as Lloyd "Truck" Garrick
- Dave Ettlin as Dave Ettlin
- Donald Neal as Jay Spry
- Robert Poletick as Steven Luxenberg
- David Goodman as Budget Advisor
- Robert G. McKay as Congressman Albert Upshaw
- William F. Zorzi as Bill Zorzi
- Connor Aikin as Jack Russell
- Keenon Brice as Aaron "Bug" Manigault
- Aubrey Deeker as Terry Hanning
- Thuliso Dingwall as Kenard
- Reggie A. Green as Arabber
- Amy Lee as Store Clerk
- Russ Widdall as Ron Lowenthal
- Curt Boushell as Andy
- Joe Inscoe as Deputy Director Arthur Tolan
- William Johnson as FBI Agent
- Paul Morella as FBI Profiler
- Dennis Hill as Detective Christeson
- Melody Williams as Woman at crime scene #1
- Melvina Williams as Woman at crime scene #2
- Mary Beth Wise as Karen
- Jim Ancel as unknown
- Leroy Graves Jr. as unknown

==== Uncredited appearances ====
- Kwame Patterson as Monk Metcalf
- Jason Moffett as Tony – surveillance team
- Brian E. McLarney as Brian McLarney – surveillance team
- Marcus Hamm as Marcus – surveillance team
- Sophia Ayoud as Cary Russell
- Jim Jones as man on corner
- Charlotte R. Noranbrock as crime scene technician

Aaron D. Hearn as Morgue Attendant
