= Clarification =

Clarification, clarifications, or clarify may refer to:

- Clarification (cooking), purification of broths
- Clarification, preparation of clarified butter
- Clarification and stabilization of wine
- Clarification (water treatment)
- "Clarifications" (The Wire), The Wire episode
- The Clarification, Declaration Concerning Status of Catholics Becoming Freemasons
