= White Lies (1996 film) =

- Directed by: Ken Selden
- Distributed by: Buena Vista International
- Release date: 1996
- Country: United States
- Language: English

White Lies is a movie, directed by Ken Selden, with Larry Gilliard Jr. and Julie Warner playing the main characters Leon Turner and Mimi Furst.

The plot is a love story between a young white woman and a young black man.

It is a story of overcoming racist prejudices, and about how a little lie can have big consequences, and about trust each other, and in the end: what chances are unfolded by forgiveness, when somebody regrets his mistake.

The year it was made and/or published is variably cited as 1995 (NY Times), 1996 (German Wikipedia site), and 1997 (several television journals / IMDB).
