= Chris Collins (writer) =

American television writer and producer

- Occupation: Television Writer
- Writing career
- Notable works: The Wire, Sons of Anarchy

Chris Collins is an American television writer and producer. He has worked on the HBO dramas The Sopranos and The Wire. He was an executive story editor for the Starz drama series Crash. He is a producer and writer for the FX series Sons of Anarchy.

== Biography ==
Collins joined the crew of The Wire in 2004 as a script coordinator for the third season. He continued to serve as a script coordinator and became a staff writer for the fourth season in 2006 . Collins and the writing staff won the Writers Guild of America (WGA) Award for Best Dramatic Series at the February 2008 ceremony for their work on the fourth season. Collins became a story editor for the fifth season in 2009. Collins was involved in the writer's planning meetings for the fifth season. He wrote the teleplay for the third episode of the fifth season "Not for Attribution" from a story he co-wrote with show runner and executive producer David Simon. Collins and the writing staff were nominated for the WGA award for Best Dramatic Series again at the February 2009 ceremony for their work on the fifth season but Mad Men won the award.

In 2009 Collins became an executive story editor and writer for new Starz drama series Crash. Showrunner Glen Mazzara handpicked the writing staff for the series and selected people with a background of writing edgier material. Collins was hired because of his work on The Wire. The series followed an ensemble cast in racially tense Los Angeles and was based on the film of the same name. Collins co-wrote the episode "The Doctor Is In" with co-executive producer Frank Renzulli and wrote the episode "Los Muertos". Mazzara, Collins and the majority of the writing staff left the series at the end of the first season.

Collins was hired as a co-producer and writer for the second season of FX crime drama Sons of Anarchy in fall 2009. Sons of Anarchy showrunner and executive producer Kurt Sutter had previously worked with Mazzara on The Shield. The series focuses on a motorcycle gang. Collins wrote the episode "Smite" and co-wrote the episode "Gilead" with Sutter.

Collins was promoted to producer for the series third season in 2010. He wrote the episode "Caregiver", co-wrote the episode "The Push" with Julie Bush, co-wrote the teleplay for the episode "Turas" with Brady Dahl based on a story by Sutter and wrote the teleplay for the season's penultimate episode "June Wedding" based on a story by Sutter. Collins was promoted to supervising producer for the fourth season in 2011. Collins co-wrote the season's second episode "Booster" with co-executive producer Dave Erickson and the sixth episode "With an X" with co-producer Regina Corrado.

== Filmography ==
Production staff

Year	Show	Role	Notes
2018	The Man in the High Castle	Co-Executive Producer	Season 3
2013	Sons of Anarchy	Executive Producer	Season 6
2012	Sons of Anarchy	Co-Executive Producer	Season 5
2011	Sons of Anarchy	Supervising Producer	Season 4
2010	Sons of Anarchy	Producer	Season 3
2009	Sons of Anarchy	Co-Producer	Season 2
2008	Crash	Executive Story Editor	Season 1
2008	The Wire	Story Editor	Season 5
2007	The Sopranos	Production co-ordinator	Season 6, part II
2006	The Wire	Script Coordinator & Staff Writer	Season 4
2006	The Sopranos	Assistant to writers	Season 6, part I
2005	Disarm	Story Editor	
2004	The Wire	Script Coordinator	Season 3
2003	The Wind Effect	Production Manager	

Writer

Year	Title	Season	Episode title	Episode	Notes
2019	John Wick: Chapter 3 – Parabellum	-	-	-	Feature. Co-written with Derek Kolstad, Shay Hatten, and Marc Abrams
2011	Sons of Anarchy	4	"With an X"	6	Co-written with Regina Corrado
2011	Sons of Anarchy	4	"Booster"	2	Co-written with Dave Erickson
2010	Sons of Anarchy	3	"June Wedding"	12	Teleplay by Collins from a story by Kurt Sutter
2010	Sons of Anarchy	3	"Turas"	9	Teleplay co-written with Brady Dahl from a story by Kurt Sutter
2010	Sons of Anarchy	3	"The Push"	6	Co-written with Julie Bush
2010	Sons of Anarchy	3	"Caregiver"	3	
2009	Sons of Anarchy	2	"Gilead"	7	Co-written with Kurt Sutter
2009	Sons of Anarchy	2	"Smite"	5	
2008	Crash	1	"Los Muertos"	7	
2008	Crash	1	"The Doctor Is In"	2	Co-written with Frank Renzulli
2008	The Wire	5	"Not for Attribution"	3	Teleplay by Collins, story co-written with David Simon

== Awards ==
Year	Award	Category	Result	Work	Notes
2009	Writers Guild of America Award	Outstanding Dramatic Series	Nominated	The Wire season 5	Shared with Ed Burns, Dennis Lehane, David Mills, George Pelecanos, Richard Price and David Simon and William F. Zorzi
2008	Writers Guild of America Award	Outstanding Dramatic Series	Won	The Wire season 4	Shared with Ed Burns, Kia Corthron, Dennis Lehane, David Mills, Eric Overmyer, George Pelecanos, Richard Price, David Simon and William F. Zorzi
