= Sergei Malatov =

Character from The Wire

Sergei Malatov Сергій Малатов
- The Wire character
- Chris Ashworth as Sergei Malatov
- First appearance: '"Ebb Tide" (2003)
- Last appearance: "Unconfirmed Reports" (2008)
- Created by: David Simon
- Portrayed by: Chris Ashworth

In-universe information
- Alias: Serge; Boris
- Gender: Male
- Occupation: Convict, Smuggler, enforcer in The Greeks' organization
- Nationality: Ukrainian

Sergei "Serge" Malatov (Ukrainian: Сергій Малатов) is a fictional character on the HBO drama series The Wire, played by Chris Ashworth. He acts as a driver and enforcer for The Greek. He is Ukrainian, although Americans often assume he is Russian. He is responsible for picking up containers of smuggled goods from the port and taking them to The Greek's front warehouse to be fenced.

== Biography ==
Malatov is a trusted lieutenant in The Greek's import business. He is said by White Mike to be "straight muscle". When vodka, appliances, electronics, drugs or Eastern Bloc women destined to be prostitutes arrive in Baltimore, Sergei ensures the cargo is delivered to The Greek's associates in the city. He mentions that he has spent four years in prison in Ukraine, and that American prisons are nowhere near as harsh.

=== Season two ===
Sergei is supposed to collect fourteen prostitutes hidden in a cargo container from the docks, but when he does not receive the all-clear signal from The Greek's accomplice on the ship which delivered the women, he abandons the container on the waterfront. The Greek later learns that the women were killed, and Sergei is sent to the Philadelphia port (the ship's next destination) to find the crewman.

He infiltrates the port and captures the crewman. When The Greek and Spiros "Vondas" Vondopoulos arrive, the crewman tells them everything about how the women were killed, and Spiros murders him. Sergei is charged with disposing of the body and The Greek instructs him to make sure there is no face or fingerprints. The body is later found and identified by a tattoo.

Sergei is friendly with drug kingpin Proposition Joe, who is supplied by The Greek. He intervenes on behalf of Nick Sobotka—because The Greek needs Nick and his uncle Frank's help to smuggle containers off of cargo ships—when Ziggy Sobotka gets into debt with Proposition Joe's nephew, Cheese.

He is ruthless in his work, and thorough in clean-up. When a drug dealer asks whether a recently found body was his handiwork, he retorts "Did he have hands? Did he have a face? Yes? Then it wasn't us. Idiot!" As most of the US population is not in police/federal DNA records (minus convicted felons, military, etc.), a body that has neither fingerprints, a recognizable appearance, or intact teeth is generally impossible to identify.

When security camera footage of him abducting the crewman is discovered by a police detail investigating the deaths of the girls and smuggling on the docks, Sergei is persuaded to become an informer and turn on The Greek and Spiros, but The Greek has already escaped. After the events on season 2, Sergei was sentenced to life imprisonment without the possibility of parole and sent to Jessup penitentiary to serve out his sentence.

=== Season five ===
Several years later, as rising kingpin Marlo Stanfield gets a line on Spiros "Vondas" Vondopoulos and the Greeks, he has Chris Partlow investigate the port investigation, as well as Sergei's criminal record at the courthouse. Upon learning that Sergei is locked up in Jessup, Marlo arranges a meeting with him. Initially, Marlo's access to Sergei is blocked by Avon Barksdale, who is effectively running the criminal activities within the prison, but after Marlo makes a payment to Avon's sister, Avon grants Marlo access to Sergei.

Sergei, despite receiving a great deal of money from Marlo, is disrespectful and states that he does not need Marlo's help or money. However, Marlo points out that Sergei can win back some favor with the Greeks if he gets a message to Vondas regarding Marlo's intentions to do business with them. Avon encourages Sergei to cooperate with Marlo, and Sergei, realizing that Marlo is right that he can claim some credit if the deal happens, agrees to get in touch with Vondas.
