= Alma Gutierrez =

Character from The Wire

- The Wire character
- Michelle Paress as Alma Gutierrez
- First appearance: "More with Less" (2008)
- Last appearance: "–30–" (2008)
- Created by: David Simon
- Portrayed by: Michelle Paress

In-universe information
- Gender: Female
- Occupation: Reporter at The Baltimore Sun

Alma M. Gutierrez is a fictional character on the HBO drama The Wire, played by actress Michelle Paress. Gutierrez is a dedicated and idealistic young reporter on the city desk of The Baltimore Sun.

== Biography ==
Gutierrez joins the staff of The Baltimore Sun five months before the fifth season begins after working for the Sun-Sentinel in Fort Lauderdale, Florida. She is eager for the chance to prove herself and is enjoying her new career. Her abilities have already caught the attention of city desk editor Gus Haynes. Gutierrez lives with her boyfriend.

=== Season 5 ===
Gutierrez submits a story about a fire in a row house and is embarrassed in front of the whole newsroom by her editor Gus Haynes and copy editor Jay Spry, who take her to task over her use of the word evacuate. Gutierrez is also assigned by Haynes to get a reaction quote from drug dealer Ricardo "Fat-Face Rick" Hendrix after the editor notices a lucrative real estate deal between Hendrix and the city council. Gutierrez is sent to Hendrix's strip club Desperado and comes back with a strong quote. She receives a contributing line in the story for her efforts. Her colleague Scott Templeton is disparaging about the credit she received and the credentials of the paper as a whole but Gutierrez remains upbeat.

Gutierrez usually covers the police beat and is excited when she reports on a home invasion and triple homicide. She awakes early the next day to look at her story in print, but is disappointed to find that it has been edited down and buried within the paper. Haynes tells her that it was a bureaucratic mishap, but her colleague Mike Fletcher tells her the piece was cut because of the area where the victims are from. Gutierrez is worried when buy-outs are announced to cut costs at the paper, but ultimately has more opportunities as veteran crime beat reporter Roger Twigg accepts a buy-out.

Without Twigg's expertise and contacts, Gutierrez struggles to find sources to provide analysis for a story about Mayor Tommy Carcetti replacing police commissioner Ervin Burrell. Gutierrez also works with the city desk team to prepare a last-minute story about the Clay Davis corruption case which was initially missed because there is no daily city court reporter on staff.

Alongside Haynes, Gutierrez begins to question Templeton's reporting, and her doubts grow after she discovers Templeton's supposedly filled notebook is empty. She reports her findings to chief editors Whiting and Klebanow, but is instead demoted and reassigned to the Bureau.

== Production ==
Paress was married to former The Wire star Larry Gilliard Jr., who played D'Angelo Barksdale. The part is Paress' first major role on screen, having previously worked primarily on stage. Paress submitted an audition tape expecting to be considered for a smaller role and was asked to play Gutierrez by executive producer and head writer David Simon. Paress describes her character as ambitious, principled and light hearted.
