= Colour piece =

Type of publication section

A colour piece (or colour feature) is a section of a publication (such as a newspaper or magazine) that focuses mainly on impressions or descriptions of the subject matter. It mainly emphasises the descriptive aspects.
