= Corey Parker Robinson =

American actor (born 1975)

- Born: February 9, 1975 (age 51); Washington, D.C., U.S.
- Occupations: Actor, Writer
- Years active: 1997–present

Corey Parker Robinson (born February 9, 1975) is an American actor.

== Career ==
Robinson is best known for his role in the HBO drama series The Wire as Detective Leander Sydnor. He also appeared in episodes of The Corner, Homicide, and ER. In the daytime soap opera Guiding Light, he played the role of Remy Boudreau.

== Filmography ==
=== Film ===
Year	Title	Role	Notes
2000	The Cactus Kid	Isaiah	
2005	The L.A. Riot Spectacular	Crazy Dee	
2010	Unstoppable	Lead Officer #1	
2018	Amateur	Coach Curtis	

=== Television ===
Year	Title	Role	Notes
1997	New York Undercover	Derrick Johnson	Episode: "The Unthinkable"
1998	Free of Eden	Lewis	Television film
1999	Homicide: Life on the Street	Yates	Episode: "Shades of Gray"
1999	ER	Antoine Bell	2 episodes
2000	The Corner	R.C.	6 episodes
2002–2008	The Wire	Leander Sydnor	45 episodes
2007	How Soon Is Now?	Samuel Johnson	Episode: "1968–1969"
2010	Past Life	Second Team Agent	Episode: "Pilot"
2011	Blue Bloods	Mark Taylor	Episode: "To Tell the Truth"
2012	Are We There Yet?	Lamarr	Episode: "The Suzanne Gets Arrested Episode"
2013	Boardwalk Empire	Uncredited	Episode: "Acres of Diamonds"
2014	The Red Road	Detective	2 episodes
2015	Orange Is the New Black	Detective Marshall	Episode: "Fake It Till You Fake It Some More"
2016	Unforgettable	Clint	Episode: "About Face"
2018	The Neighborhood	Agent Taylor	2 episodes
2020	Gravesend	Agent Taylor	2 episodes
