= Michelle Paress =

American actress

- Occupation: Actress
- Known for: The Wire
- Spouse: Lawrence Gilliard Jr. (m. 1996; div. 2020)

Michelle Paress is an American actress. She starred in the HBO series The Wire as reporter Alma Gutierrez; Paress joined the cast in the show's fifth season. In 1996, she married a future star of the same show, actor Lawrence Gilliard Jr. They divorced in 2020.
