= Lawrence Gilliard Jr. =

American actor

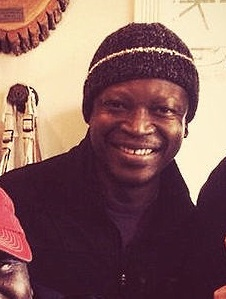
- Gilliard Jr. in 2014
- Born: September 22, 1971 (age 55); New York City, U.S.
- Occupation: Actor
- Years active: 1989–present
- Spouse: Michelle Paress (m. 1996; div. 2020)
- Children: 2
- Website: LawrenceGilliardJr.com

Lawrence Gilliard Jr. (born September 22, 1971) is an American actor who has appeared in films, television series, and theatre. He portrayed D'Angelo Barksdale on the HBO drama series The Wire, a role which earned him critical acclaim. He is also known for his role as Bob Stookey in the AMC horror drama The Walking Dead. He was in the cast of David Simon's HBO TV series The Deuce, which premiered in September 2017 and concluded in October 2019. Gilliard Jr. has had roles in movies such as Straight Out of Brooklyn (1991), Next Stop Wonderland (1998), and Gangs of New York (2002).

== Early life and education ==
Gilliard was born in New York City. He and his family moved to Baltimore, Maryland, when he was seven years old.

Gilliard played clarinet and studied classical music at Baltimore School for the Arts. Jada Pinkett Smith and Tupac Shakur were classmates of Gilliard at the Baltimore School of the Arts.

After attending Juilliard School for three years as a clarinet performance student, Gilliard decided to pursue acting instead of music. He also studied acting at the American Academy of Dramatic Arts, The Acting Studio – New York, and the Stella Adler Conservatory.

== Career ==
Gilliard made his film debut playing the lead, Dennis Brown, in the 1991 independent film Straight Out of Brooklyn.

Gilliard has appeared on numerous television crime dramas such as Law & Order, Homicide: Life on the Street, The Wire, New York Undercover, and CSI: NY. Film roles include a love-struck ghetto teen in LottoLand (1995), an earnest college football player in The Waterboy (1998), and a member of the Dead Rabbits in Gangs of New York (2002).

Gilliard is also a stage actor. He received positive reviews for his role of Booth in a production of the Pulitzer Prize-winning play Topdog/Underdog. He joined The Walking Dead cast as a regular, playing Bob Stookey.

== Personal life ==
In 1996, Gilliard married Michelle Paress, who joined the cast of The Wire in its fifth season. They divorced in 2020.

== Filmography ==
Key
†	Denotes works that have not yet been released

=== Film ===
Year	Title	Role	Notes
1991	Straight Out of Brooklyn	Dennis Brown	
1993	Fly By Night	Jed Lyte	
1993	The Pickle	Boy Who Stopped	
1995	Lotto Land	Hank	
1995	Money Train	Hood #3/Hood #1	
1996	Trees Lounge	James	
1996	The Associate	Thomas, Plaza Bellhop	
1997	White Lies	Leon Turner / Leon Chame	
1998	A Soldier's Sweetheart	Shoeshine	
1998	The Substitute 2: School's Out	Dontae	
1998	Next Stop Wonderland	Brett	
1998	One Tough Cop	Curtis Wilkins	
1998	The Waterboy	Derek Wallace	
1999	Simply Irresistible	Nolan Traynor	
1999	Loving Jezebel	Walter	
2000	Cecil B. Demented	Lewis	
2001	Home Invaders		
2001	Trigger Happy	Ray	
2002	Gangs of New York	Jimmy Spoils	
2003	Kill the Poor	Spike	
2004	Brother to Brother	Marcus	
2004	The Machinist	Jackson	
2004	Woman Hollering Creek	Melvin	Short
2008	Turnipseed	Johnny Turnipseed	
2008	The Highs & Lows of Milo Brown	Elliot	Short
2011	The Double	Agent Burton	
2012	Junior	Det. Daniel Abrams Sr.	Short
2012	The Wire: The Musical	D'Angelo Barksdale	Short
2012	The Trial of Ben Barry	June	Short
2012	Would You Rather	Dr. Barden	
2013	Turnipseed: Second Chance	John Turnipseed	
2014	Walk of Shame	Scrilla	
2018	Hot Air	Earl	
2020	One Night in Miami...	Drew Bundini Brown	
2023	Big George Foreman	Archie Moore	
2023	The Featherweight	Sandy Saddler	

=== Television ===
Year	Title	Role	Notes
1992	In the Line of Duty: Street War	Will	TV movie
1993	Homicide: Life on the Street	William Lyness	Episode: "A Dog and a Pony Show"
1993	ABC Afterschool Specials		Episode: "Girlfriend"
1993	Survive the Night		TV movie
1993–1994	George	Lathan Basmore	9 episodes
1994	New York Undercover	Quentin	Episode: "After Shakespeare"
1995	Inflammable	Wesley Raines	TV movie
2000	Sally Hemings: An American Scandal	Henry Jackson	TV movie
2002	Less than Perfect	Chester	Episode: "Kip Steadman's Guide to Dating"
2002–2003	The Wire	D'Angelo Barksdale	18 episodes
2004	The Jury	Corey Hamilton	Episode: "The Boxer"
2005	CSI: NY	Officer Omar Lilly	Episode: "Crime and Misdemeanor"
2005	Law & Order: Criminal Intent	Eddie Roberts	Episode: "Acts of Contrition"
2006	Numb3rs	Amos Shabaz	Episode: "Waste Not"
2008	Fear Itself	James	Episode: "Spooked"
2009	The Beast	Nick / Raymond Beaumont	10 episodes
2009	Trauma	Duke	Episode: "Blue Balloon"
2010	Friday Night Lights	Elden	Episode: "The Lights in Carroll Park"
2010	The Boondocks	2nd Prisoner (voice)	Episode: "A Date with the Booty Warrior"
2010	Detroit 1-8-7	Lefty Reed	Episode: "Déjà Vu/All In"
2010	Lie to Me	Marcus Weaver	Episode: "Smoked"
2011	Partners	Dr. J	TV movie
2012	Southland	John's Sponsor	2 episodes
2012	Army Wives	Marcus Williams	7 episodes
2013	Longmire	Burke	Episode: "Unquiet Mind"
2013–2015	The Walking Dead	Bob Stookey	14 episodes
2015	Graceland	Deputy Agent Sean Logan	6 episodes
2015	Elementary	Dr. Dwyer Kirk	Episode: "The Eternity Injection"
2015	The Good Wife	Ken Boxer Jr.	Episode: "Winning Ugly"
2017–2019	The Deuce	Chris Alston	25 episodes
2018	God Friended Me	Aaron	Episode: "Coney Island Cyclone"
2020	Bull	Prosecutor Benjamin	Episode: "My Corona"
2021	Chicago P.D.	Latrell Wade	Episode: "Equal Justice"
2021–2022	That Damn Michael Che	Clarence	2 episodes
2021–2023	Power Book III: Raising Kanan	Azumadeen 'Deen' Tippett	4 episodes
2023–2026	Law & Order	Attorney Aaron Dressler	3 episodes
2024	Clipped	Grady Rivers	1 episode
