= Cedric Daniels =

Character from The Wire

- The Wire character
- Lance Reddick as Cedric Daniels.
- First appearance: "The Target" (2002)
- Last appearance: "–30–" (2008)
- Created by: David Simon
- Portrayed by: Lance Reddick

In-universe information
- Gender: Male
- Title: Deputy of Operations
- Occupation: Lawyer; Deputy Commissioner for Operations
- Spouse: Marla Daniels
- Significant other: Rhonda Pearlman

Cedric Daniels is a fictional character on the HBO drama The Wire, portrayed by Lance Reddick. Daniels is well-regarded in the Baltimore Police Department for making his subordinates focus on decent police work and quality arrests. He occasionally has disagreements with higher-ranking officers but for the most part performs well, and has thereby gained a reputation as both a reliable commander and an above-average investigator within the force, in stark contrast to some of his superiors and peers, most of whom display varying degrees of corruption and unreliability.

Daniels was investigated by the FBI for corruption prior to the start of the series. By the end of the series, he rises through the ranks to police commissioner but resigns after refusing a political request to manipulate crime statistics. As a result, he starts a new career as a criminal defense lawyer.

== Biography ==
=== Season 1 ===
Daniels was the lieutenant of the Baltimore Police Department's Narcotics Unit, and the shift commander for detectives Kima Greggs, Ellis Carver, and Thomas "Herc" Hauk. His commanding officer is Major Raymond Foerster.

When Jimmy McNulty prompts Judge Daniel Phelan to start asking questions about the Barksdale Organization, Daniels is unable to give Foerster much information on Avon Barksdale, who has managed to operate under the radar until then. Soon afterward, Daniels is given command of the Barksdale detail and appoints Greggs as lead detective.

Daniels meets with Deputy Commissioner Ervin Burrell, who tells him the case should be made with buy busts in a fast, straightforward investigation. Daniels discusses the new assignment with his wife Marla and promises to run the investigation per the wishes of the higher-ups.

Marla's own ambitions drive her to pursue a career in politics, and Daniels attends political fundraisers with her. At one such function, Daniels finds himself hiding with the politicians' drivers in the kitchen. There, he meets State Senator Clay Davis' driver Damian "Day-Day" Price, later discovered to be a bag man involved with the Barksdales.

Daniels has a difficult relationship with the insubordinate McNulty, who is informed by his FBI contact that Daniels has $200,000 more in liquid assets than his salary warrants; it is later implied that these were picked up during Daniels' tenure in the Eastern District.

Daniels initially tries to follow Burrell's advice that the operation should be fast and simple, and shoots down McNulty's suggestions to mount a surveillance operation. Daniels also has difficulties with several other detectives deliberately assigned to the detail because they are considered the worst in the department: Patrick Mahon is injured by Bodie Broadus during a raid and takes early retirement, after which Mahon's partner Augustus Polk takes to drinking and misses several days' work. However, in contrast, Lester Freamon proves to be quietly capable and a huge asset to Daniels' detail.

Another problematic assignee to the detail is Roland "Prez" Pryzbylewski, a trigger happy detective who had once shot up his own patrol car. Daniels is able to convince Prez's commanding officer, Lieutenant Walter Cantrell, to balance taking Prez out of his hands by assigning him the promising Leander Sydnor. Prez attends an unsanctioned, drunken late-night raid on the Barksdale tower operations with Herc and Carver, during which Prez seriously injures a young boy. Daniels defends Prez to his superiors and gains the respect of his father-in-law, Major Stan Valchek. Under Daniels' supervision, both Prez and Sydnor become valuable assets to the detail.

Elsewhere, Daniels suspects Herc and Carver of skimming seized drug money. He leniently gives them one day to return the money rather than immediately turning them in.

As the investigation progresses, Daniels' attitude towards the case changes, and he risks his career several times in order to protect it. For example, when Major William Rawls wants to issue a murder warrant for D'Angelo Barksdale based on flimsy evidence, Daniels resorts to bypassing the chain of command and persuading Burrell to delay the warrants.

Freamon uncovers the Barksdales' campaign contributions to Baltimore political figures, leading Daniels' team to arrest Day-Day. However, rather than seize the Barksdale money in Day-Day's possession, Daniels is forced to return the funds with no further investigation, to avoid raising Davis' ire.

Burrell tries to shut the detail down and threatens to reveal the source of Daniels' liquid assets, but Daniels calls his bluff and points out that doing so would bring bad press to the BPD. Daniels also is able to determine that Burrell is using Carver as a mole.

The Barksdale investigation ends with the arrests of Avon and D'Angelo, along with soldier Wee-Bey Brice and several other members of the organization. Convictions are secured against all participants, and Wee-Bey confesses to several unsolved murders to prevent fallout from reaching other members of the organization.

Daniels is left unsatisfied because Avon is convicted for minor offenses, and Avon's right-hand man, Stringer Bell, escapes uncharged. Much better results are within Daniels' grasp when his team convinces D'Angelo to testify against the organization. However, D'Angelo's mother Brianna talks him out of it, and he ends up taking a 20-year sentence for his family.

At the end of the first season, Daniels is passed over for promotion to major in favor of Cantrell. However, he has won the respect of his unit for his dedication to their cases, which surpasses that of their other commanding officers.

=== Season 2 ===
As punishment for defying Burrell, Daniels is reassigned to evidence control. Daniels contemplates quitting to become a lawyer, but reconsiders when Valchek insists that he be given command of a special detail to investigate stevedore union leader Frank Sobotka. Daniels realizes Valchek had asked for him personally in exchange for offering Burrell political support, and uses this fact to leverage several promises from Burrell.

Daniels insists on picking his own detectives and forces Burrell to agree that he become commander of a permanent unit if the investigation is successful. The new detail initially consists of Prez, Greggs and Herc.

At Herc's insistence, Daniels allows Carver the chance to rejoin the team despite his previous treachery. Daniels campaigns for McNulty and Freamon to rejoin the team, but Rawls refuses to reverse his punitive transfer of McNulty to the marine unit. Daniels's detail works closely with Bunk Moreland, who is investigating the discovery of fourteen Jane Does at the Port of Baltimore, and Officer Beadie Russell, detailed to Bunk's investigation from the Port Authority.

Russell blossoms into a capable investigator with Daniels's team and is instrumental in coming up with the idea of cloning the port's computers to monitor smuggling. Daniels finally persuades Rawls to let McNulty return by agreeing to take on Rawls's murders from the docks. Meanwhile, Daniels has tensions with Marla due to his career decisions. Eventually, they begin to sleep in different rooms of their home.

The detail links Sobotka's union to a smuggling operation run by a mysterious figure called "The Greek". Sobotka's son Ziggy is arrested for killing the Greek's fence, George "Double G" Glekas, and his nephew Nick is proven to be involved in drug dealing. Daniels' detail is not informed of Ziggy's arrest until after he gives a signed confession to Sergeant Jay Landsman, giving the Greek time to clear out his warehouse.

Valchek becomes disillusioned with Daniels when he learns that he has shifted his focus away from Sobotka and insults the detail in a heated meeting. Daniels is forced once again to defend Prez after he punches Valchek. Daniels quickly collects statements from everyone present and convinces Valchek that it would be best to accept Prez's apology.

Sobotka is arrested along with several other people identified by the detail. It is only after they attempt to arrest Double G that they learn he was murdered by Ziggy. To protect his family, Daniels's team convince Sobotka to act as an informant on the Greek and arranged for him to return with a lawyer the next day. However, Sobotka is murdered before his testimony can be taken, and the Greek evades arrest.

The investigation is disappointing for the detail, but is deemed a tremendous success for the BPD. Bunk and Freamon secure evidence that solves the Jane Doe homicides, but no conviction is made since the suspect was killed by the Greek. However, "White" Mike McArdle, Sergei Malatov and Eton Ben-Eleazer are arrested, putting Daniels in the department's good graces once again.

=== Season 3 ===
Burrell follows through with his promise and lets Daniels form a permanent Major Case Unit, consisting of McNulty, Greggs, Freamon, Prez, Sydnor, and a new recruit, Caroline Massey. The detail returns to investigating the Barksdales and their association with Proposition Joe, an East Baltimore drug kingpin with links to the Greek. Cedric separates from Marla, partly because of her dissatisfaction with his career path, which Cedric blames on her own political climbing.

Nonetheless, he continues to support her, attending functions in uniform and acting the part of a devoted husband. Cedric starts a relationship with State's Attorney Rhonda Pearlman, but is skeptical about making it public while Marla runs for Baltimore City Council; he claims that it will look bad for Marla's political career to have him leave her for a white woman.

Daniels gets commended several times by several senior figures throughout the BPD due to his good police work, including Burrell, Rawls, and Major Howard "Bunny" Colvin, amongst others. This, however, is not enough for Daniels, whose promotion to major is being held up due to Marla's political conflicts. Daniels also feels that Burrell is purposefully holding him back due to past incidents. Daniels becomes even more angered when McNulty goes around the chain of command to Colvin, and has the MCU shift its focus back to the Barksdales.

Daniels makes it clear that McNulty is done with the MCU after Stringer is arrested. Stringer is murdered before he can be apprehended, but Avon is rearrested on weapons charges. When Colvin is forced to retire from the BPD due to his "Hamsterdam" experiment, Daniels is promoted to Colvin's old post as major for the Western District, as Mayor Clarence Royce throws support behind Marla.

=== Season 4 ===
Daniels tries to convince McNulty, now a patrolman in the Western, to return to detective work with no success. He realizes that McNulty is better off with his new rank on a personal level. Greggs meets with Daniels to discuss a transfer after Rawls appoints the abrasive Lieutenant Charles Marimow to head the MCU. Daniels suggests a move to Homicide, and successfully meets with Rawls to facilitate the transfer.

Elsewhere, after finding out that his student Randy Wagstaff knows information about Curtis “Lex” Anderson's murder, Prez – now a schoolteacher – meets with Daniels, who suggests that Prez consult with Carver over the matter. Following the mayoral election, Daniels attends a COMSTAT meeting and tells Burrell and Rawls that the homicide rate in the Western has dropped while other felony rates have risen. Mayor-elect Tommy Carcetti observes the meeting and is impressed that Daniels prioritizes quality felony arrests over statistical reductions in crime.

Carcetti learns that he is more respected than most other commanding officers in the BPD. Daniels is invited to lunch with Carcetti and takes his offer to be appointed commander of the Criminal Investigations Division (CID) under Rawls. Burrell realizes that the new mayor intends to promote Daniels to commissioner at his own expense. Burrell and Davis convince city council president Nerese Campbell to oppose Daniels, hinting that they plan to revisit the previous corruption allegations against him.

As CID colonel, Daniels clears Herc of a racial profiling incident and assists Freamon in building a case against Marlo Stanfield. Freamon discovers evidence of dead bodies in vacant row houses and asks Daniels for more manpower for a citywide search. The city's homicide rate increases dramatically with the discovery of 22 concealed bodies.

Daniels transfers McNulty back into the MCU, with the unit again refocused on Stanfield. Rawls comes to believe that Daniels will be moved up the ladder while Burrell and Davis conspire to keep Daniels from getting the commissioner's post.

=== Season 5 ===
Daniels is outraged when Carcetti closes the MCU due to budgetary problems, leaving the investigations into Davis, Stanfield, and the vacant murders unresolved. He and Pearlman arrange a meeting with Carcetti and State's Attorney Rupert Bond, leading to the mayor approving a two-man detail for the Davis case. Daniels is further angered that Davis has been given priority over the vacant murders. He reluctantly reassigns McNulty and Greggs to homicide, while putting Freamon and Sydnor on the Davis detail.

Carcetti finally accrues the political capital he needs to fire Burrell when the commissioner delivers false crime statistics. The mayor plans to temporarily promote Rawls to acting commissioner, with Daniels serving as Deputy Commissioner of Operations to prepare him to permanently take over the post. Carcetti leaks the story to The Baltimore Sun to gauge reaction to Daniels. However, the story runs with a quote, invented by reporter Scott Templeton, falsely implicating Daniels in causing Burrell's departure.

Daniels meets with Marla to discuss Burrell's potential reaction to the story, and both become worried that he will reveal evidence of corruption from Daniels's past. Marla persuades Daniels to approach Burrell and promise not to take his post. Burrell gives Daniels the silent treatment.

Campbell convinces Burrell to leave quietly in exchange for a comfortable replacement position. Carcetti holds a press conference to announce the promotions. Daniels is promoted to commissioner after the homeless killings and the vacant murders are solved, but resigns from the position over threats from Campbell and his refusal to "juke the stats". His last act as commissioner is to confer a set of promotions, including that of Carver to lieutenant. In the final flash-forward montage, Daniels is shown practicing as a criminal defense lawyer before Pearlman, who recuses herself as a newly commissioned judge.

== Production ==
=== Casting ===
Lance Reddick was cast in the role after auditioning for the parts of Bunk Moreland and Bubbles. He was told that they were looking for "a name" to fill the Daniels role. Reddick has described the character as serious, intense and committed. Although a number of actors are credited in every episode regardless of their appearance, Daniels appears in more episodes of the show than any other character (58 out of 60), and is also the last original character to miss an episode.
