= Ziggy Sobotka =

Character from The Wire

- The Wire character
- James Ransone as Ziggy Sobotka
- First appearance: "Ebb Tide"; June 1, 2003
- Last appearance: "Port in a Storm"; August 24, 2003
- Created by: David Simon
- Portrayed by: James Ransone

In-universe information
- Full name: Chester Karol Sobotka
- Alias: Ziggy
- Gender: Male
- Occupation: Dock worker
- Family: Frank Sobotka (father)
- Relatives: Nick Sobotka (cousin)

Chester Karol "Ziggy" Sobotka is a fictional character on the HBO drama The Wire, played by actor James Ransone. His father Frank Sobotka was a well-respected stevedore union leader. Ziggy's thoughtless and immature behavior gained him little respect among other members of the union and The Greek's crime organization, although he was a source of amusement for them and was generally well-liked.

== Biography ==
=== Season 2 ===
Ziggy is Frank Sobotka's son and Nick's cousin. He is a Baltimore dock worker and is involved in his father's stevedores union, but is also involved in criminal activity. Like most of the dock workers, Ziggy frequents Delores' bar, where he amuses the other customers with his drunken antics, such as publicly exposing himself. His work on the docks is often poor, resulting in him regularly being fired and reinstated by his father. Due to his lack of seniority, Ziggy receives little work.

He is often portrayed as a clumsy and inept beneficiary of his father's position and is more interested in goofing off. He is close to Nick, who often bails him out when his various money-making schemes backfire. Despite his shortcomings, however, he has a better understanding of technology than many of his colleagues. He uses his computer research skills to assist Nick in his dealings with the Greeks.

When thirteen dead women are discovered in one of Sobotka's shipping containers, Ziggy is dealing drugs supplied by "White Mike" McArdle. He tries unsuccessfully to convince the more streetwise Nick to join him. He sells the drugs at street level using an East Baltimore dealer known as Frog. When Frog lies about being robbed and keeps the money, White Mike severs ties with Ziggy.

He turns to smuggling with his cousin, starting with a container of digital cameras. During a meeting with George "Double G" Glekas, a front man for an international smuggling operation, Ziggy's knowledge of the product helps to secure a better deal. However, when Glekas sees Ziggy taking pictures, he angrily smashes the camera. When Ziggy uses his share of the money to buy a new leather coat, Nick chastises him for flashing his newfound wealth. This also earns him the disdain of Maui.

Turning to a drug dealer named Cheese for a fresh supply, Ziggy finds himself ripped off again. Cheese's group steals his car, delivers a beating and threatens to kill him if he does not pay within a week. The debt is ultimately cancelled when Nick enlists the help of the Greeks, since they are shown to supply the entire operation. The two of them smuggle chemicals that the Greeks use to process cocaine. When offered payment in the form of drugs, Nick opts for cash instead to stop Ziggy from failing at another scheme (the Greeks, who are rightly impressed by Nick's criminal acumen, initially offered him the drugs because they knew he would be able to make a large profit from selling them). Ziggy accepts regular installments from Nick until he decides that his pride has been hurt too much and dramatically throws a pile of bills away in refusal.

After losing a fight with Maui, in response to a fake paternity suit prank, Ziggy buys a duck and takes it to Delores' bar. He feeds the duck too much alcohol and becomes upset when it dies. In an attempt to prove his smuggling skills, Ziggy begins stealing cars with Johnny Fifty. He announces this to Glekas, who reluctantly agrees to participate. Upon delivery, Glekas refuses to part with the agreed sum, sending Ziggy into a rage. He returns with a gun and kills Glekas with a barrage of gunshots. He also wounds a boy working in the warehouse.

Ziggy breaks down in tears when he comes to his senses and confesses to the police when they arrive. While being interviewed by Sergeant Jay Landsman at the Homicide division, he agrees to sign a murder confession Landsman had prepared based on Ziggy's statements. Ziggy requests the document be changed to reflect that Double G "begged" for his life. Frank later visits Ziggy in jail and apologizes for not doing more to help his son. Ziggy tells Frank that the union had always come before him, harkening back towards the memories they had shared previously on the docks. Ziggy is convicted of the murder and is last seen walking to his cell in a prison, serving out his sentence.

== Origins ==
The actor who portrays Ziggy, James Ransone, was a Baltimore native and described the character as representative of the difficulties people face just trying to get by in Baltimore. The character's creators have deemed him "the angry prince of goofs".

In an online interview, David Simon stated that Ziggy is loosely based on a real stevedore named Pinkie Bannion whose antics have become a local legend around the docks. According to Simon, Bannion "used to take his duck to the bar and repeatedly expose 'pretty boy' and all else. As they said in Bawlmer about Pinkie: 'That boy ain't right.'"
