= Chris Ashworth =

American actor

- Born: Christopher Michael Ashworth; March 13; Farmville, Virginia, U.S.
- Occupation: Actor
- Years active: 2000–present

Christopher Michael Ashworth (born March 13) is an American actor, perhaps best known for his portrayal of Sergei Malatov on The Wire. He commonly plays characters from Eastern Europe due to his ability to mimic accents and dialects.

Ashworth began training in martial arts, particularly Muay Thai and Brazilian jiu-jitsu, in 1993. He also earned two associates' degrees, criminal justice & general studies, and a bachelor's degree in criminal justice. He made his acting debut in 2000, in the low-budget sci-fi film Aquarius. He followed this up with a number of small roles in higher budget films such as Cecil B. DeMented, The Replacements and The Watcher before eventually landing a regular role on The Wire's second season in 2003. He has since appeared in numerous other films and television series including Without a Trace, The Lost Room and Terminator Salvation.

== Filmography ==
=== Film ===
Year	Film	Role	Notes
2000	Aquarius	Gan/Marcus Pavlof	
2000	Cecil B. DeMented	News Camera man	Uncredited
2000	The Replacements	Sentinels Player #38	Uncredited
2000	The Watcher	S.W.A.T. Team Leader	Uncredited
2004	Mafioso: The Father, the Son	Surfer Boy	
2004	Hitch	Derek	
2005	The Refuge	Michael	
2008	Love Lies Bleeding	Eddie	
2008	Sex and Lies in Sin City: The Ted Binion Scandal	Frank Lipjanic	TV film
2009	Terminator Salvation	Richter	
2013	Space Warriors	Cosmonaut Yuri	TV film
2013	The Demented	Military Soldier	
2014	13 Sins	Park Police Officer	
2015	Hero of the Underworld	Chris	
2016	Deepwater Horizon	Coast Guard Commander	

=== Television ===
Year	Show	Role	Notes
2003	Critical Rescue	Dennis Clapp	1 episode
2003–2008	The Wire	Sergei Malatov	11 episodes
2005	America's Most Wanted	Phillip Saul	1 episode
2006	The Lost Room	Kreutzfeld Guard #2	1 episode
2008	Without a Trace	Lt. Rick Cheever	1 episode
2012	Justified	Trooper Roby	1 episode
2014	Those Who Kill	Officer Cridge	2 episodes
2016	Underground	Hollander	2 episodes
2016	Outsiders	Merrimac Cop #2	1 episode
2016	Turn: Washington's Spies	Steer	1 episode
2018	Sneaky Pete	Miro	5 episodes
2018	Deception	Ominous Man	1 episode
2018	Elementary	Doron	1 episode
2018	The Resident	Reggie Perez	3 episode
2019	Bosch	Vardy	
