= Augustus Haynes =

Character from The Wire

- The Wire character
- Clark Johnson as Gus Haynes
- First appearance: "More with Less" (2008)
- Last appearance: "–30–" (2008)
- Created by: David Simon
- Portrayed by: Clark Johnson

In-universe information
- Alias: Gus
- Gender: Male
- Occupation: City Desk Editor at The Baltimore Sun

Augustus "Gus" Haynes is a fictional character on the HBO drama The Wire, played by actor Clark Johnson, who also directed multiple episodes of the series. Haynes is the dedicated and principled editor for The Baltimore Sun city desk.

== Character depiction ==
Haynes is a reporter who now serves as city desk editor of The Baltimore Sun. He has worked at the paper for many years; he claims to have dropped out of journalism school and worked his way up from the police beat and labor beat to his current position. He maintains several contacts within the Baltimore Police Department.

Haynes is profane and often conflicts with the management of The Sun. He is a reporter's editor and is quick to criticize or complement others.

=== Season 5 ===
Haynes often smokes on the loading dock of the building with fellow veterans, police reporter Roger Twigg, court reporter Bill Zorzi and State Desk Editor Tim Phelps. Haynes reports to Metro Desk Editor Steven Luxenberg and is required to manage a team of journalists including city hall reporter Jeff Price, general assignments reporters Scott Templeton and Mike Fletcher, Twigg and Alma Gutierrez on the police beat, ornery veteran Bill Zorzi and rewrite man Jay Spry, among others.

Haynes is responsible for editing the stories his reporters submit, keeping them on deadline and in organizing the submissions for daily budget meeting with managing editor Thomas Klebanow. The budget meeting determines how much space each story is allocated and Haynes often calls for budget lines (short summaries of stories) from his staff so he can present them in the meeting. Haynes is also working with executive editor James Whiting on a prospective series of articles about the city school system.

Haynes is upset at continuing cutbacks at the paper causing the closure of foreign bureaus and the loss of veteran reporters and their institutional memory. He is outspoken about the loss of their transportation reporter when The Sun is beaten to a story about city bus cutbacks by the Daily Record. He clashes with Whiting when the executive editor suppresses a story about the University of Maryland failing to meet its desegregation goals. Whiting refuses to run the story because he is friends with the Dean of Journalism, who assures him that the university's reputation is improving amongst black faculty and students.

Haynes helps to identify and generate stories, including dispatching Twigg to report on a row house fire and noticing a zoning issue in a set of city council minutes that indicates a political scandal. While checking the minutes from a meeting Price has attended, Haynes notices the name of known drug dealer Ricardo "Fat Face Rick" Hendrix, who owns a strip club that is being relocated by the council.

Haynes discerns that the city will lose a substantial amount of money on the deal, to the benefit of the drug dealer. He has reporters investigate and links the property exchange to campaign contributions from Hendrix to city council president Nerese Campbell. Haynes is even able to manipulate Campbell into revealing that there are further campaign donations that he has not recognized. When Klebanow congratulates Haynes on the story, he gives full credit to Price. Haynes rewards his team by taking them out for drinks.

Templeton delivers a story about a mother of four who died of an allergic reaction to crabs. Templeton includes mention of a scholarship fund for the woman's children. However, Haynes later learns that the details of a correction by Templeton involving a scam being run by the mom's relative are phony. Haynes meets with Whiting's education piece team to discuss their approach to a series of articles on the subject.

Haynes and Scott Shane argue that the school children face wider problems than a lack of funding for their education. Templeton disagrees and Whiting backs his view that a tightly focused story will be easier to read and will appeal more to their audience. Haynes is angry that they are focusing on one aspect of a larger problem but Whiting insists that widening the focus would dilute the impact of the story.

Although he doesn't like the story idea, Haynes later tries unsuccessfully to revive the series as a project for Templeton (who he has become distrustful of), but is rebuffed by Klebanow and Whiting because they want Templeton to continue the "homeless serial killer" story.

Templeton is assigned to write a color piece about the Baltimore Orioles' Opening Day. When Templeton delivers an unverifiable story about a disabled boy who would only give his nickname and was cutting class to attend the game Haynes is reluctant to run it because it violates the paper's policy on naming its subjects. Haynes is overruled by Whiting.

Haynes is apologetic when Gutierrez's story about a home invasion triple homicide is cut in length and relegated to the metro section. Gutierrez also presents a story about a series of potentially linked murders of homeless men but the details are not sufficient for it to receive a great deal of coverage.

Haynes is angry when Whiting announces another round of buy outs and the closure of several foreign bureaus (including Beijing and Jerusalem) and questions why their funding is being cut when the newspaper remains profitable. Haynes is further disappointed when his friend and fellow veteran Twigg is manipulated into accepting a buy out. Haynes himself is told by Whiting and Klebanow that he is essential in managing the transitions in the newsroom.

Norman Wilson, an ex-colleague and current advisor to Mayor Tommy Carcetti, leaks a story to Haynes about the Mayor's plans for the police department. Carcetti is going to force commissioner Ervin Burrell to resign and eventually replace him with colonel Cedric Daniels. Haynes offers the story to Templeton but reassigns it to Twigg when Twigg demonstrates in depth knowledge of Daniels' background. Haynes assigns Templeton to gather react quotes for the piece and is suspicious when Templeton comes up with an incredibly worded quote.

Haynes presses Templeton for his source and he claims that it came from Nerese Campbell. After work Haynes drinks with Twigg and they discuss their reasons for getting into the industry and bemoan the current state of the paper. Haynes reveals that watching his father set time aside to read the paper each day convinced him of its importance and that he wanted to be a part of it. Twigg quotes H.L. Mencken and Haynes dismisses their predecessor, Twigg leaves telling Haynes that he forgives him.

Haynes amuses the newsroom with running commentary on the press conference Carcetti holds to announce the transitions in the department. Klebanow wonders how much of Haynes' insight will filter into their coverage and Haynes comments that with the loss of Twigg it will be difficult to find sources to support a thorough analysis of the promotions.

Haynes' team are also forced to hurry to catch up when the lack of a daily city court reporter causes them to miss the development of the Clay Davis corruption investigation. Haynes is impressed with Templeton's work on this story.

Eventually, Haynes begins to suspect that Templeton is fabricating his stories. When a homeless veteran confronts Templeton and Haynes about a combat story that he claims Templeton made up, he takes a trip to Walter Reed Medical Center in Washington, D.C. to talk to another vet, who confirms that the veteran is an honest man. Also, during a meeting with Nerese Campbell, she reveals that she was surprised to hear that someone said that Cedric Daniels had a hand in then-Commissioner Burrell's dismissal — a quote previously attributed to Campbell herself by Templeton.

He confronts Klebanow, who stands by Templeton. Later, in an argument, Templeton throws a notebook which he says has all his notes in it — when Gutierrez takes a look at it, she discovers it is blank. She relays this information to Gus, who once again confronts Whiting. This time, he is sent back to the copy desk as punishment.
