= Leander Sydnor =

Character from The Wire

- The Wire character
- Corey Parker Robinson as Leander Sydnor
- First appearance: "The Detail" (2002)
- Last appearance: "–30–" (2008)
- Created by: David Simon
- Portrayed by: Corey Parker Robinson

In-universe information
- Gender: Male
- Title: Detective
- Occupation: Detective in the Baltimore police department's major crimes unit

Leander Sydnor is a fictional character on the HBO drama The Wire, played by actor Corey Parker Robinson. Sydnor is a young, married Baltimore Police detective who is a member of the Barksdale detail and later works in the Major Crimes Unit.

== Biography ==
=== Season one ===
Sydnor is assigned to the Barksdale detail from the Auto Theft Unit after Cedric Daniels requests Sydnor's commanding officer, Lt. Cantrell, give him his best detective to balance out having to take "his worst" – the erratic Roland Pryzbylewski. Once in the detail, he is partnered with Lester Freamon and the pair work on following the Barksdale organisation's paper trail.

Sydnor also performs valuable undercover work, making hand-to-hand buys to build evidence, alongside Kima Greggs and her informant Bubbles. Sydnor's initial attempt to disguise himself as a "junkie" is not credible to Bubbles, but he proves responsible for identifying Avon Barksdale at the annual West-Side versus East-Side basketball game. He later tells Freamon, who has become something of a mentor to the young detective, that the Barksdale investigation is the best police work he has ever done.

=== Season three ===
Sydnor returns to working in his old district after the dissolution of the Barksdale detail. When Daniels establishes the Major Case Unit, he is allowed to choose his own detectives and encourages Sydnor to transfer in, replacing one of the spots vacated by Herc and Carver transferring out. Sydnor takes up the offer and again works on investigating the Barksdale organization. During paperword and admin duties he mentions "missing Prez".

=== Season four ===
In Season four, the Major Case Unit starts investigating Marlo Stanfield in addition to the Barksdale money trail. With Daniels promoted to Major, Lester is now the de facto commander of the unit, having been allowed to hand-pick their shift lieutenant Jimmy Asher, a soon-to-retire officer who takes an entirely hands-off approach to the unit's investigations. When the money trail leads the investigation to major political figures, Sydnor worries about the potential damage to his career; nonetheless, he personally delivers the subpoena for financial records to State Senator Clay Davis.

Davis angrily protests the subpoenas to Mayor Clarence Royce, who then orders Burrell to rein in the Major Crimes Unit. William Rawls suggests that proper supervision is all the unit needs and replaces Asher with Lieutenant Charles Marimow. Marimow is a caustic commander with a reputation for being a "unit killer". Marimow's command style drives away Freamon and Greggs, leaving only Sydnor and Massey.

Sydnor decides he wants to leave the unit at the first available opening. With the transfer in of Herc and Kenneth Dozerman, Sydnor gets two allies in his desire to make cases (and who shared his dislike of Marimow). Ultimately the unit is unsuccessful at building a case against Marlo under Marimow's supervision. Over the course of the season, Sydnor mentors Dozerman, and also cautions Herc on the consequences of lying to Marimow. Herc nevertheless continues to act in an unprofessional and often counterproductive manner while in the unit.

Syndor is angered when Herc reveals information to corner boy Little Kevin, resulting in Randy Wagstaff being targeted as a snitch. The unit is eventually reconstituted under the control of Freamon after Daniels gets promoted to CID colonel. Under Freamon's leadership, Asher is renamed Lieutenant again, and Jimmy McNulty and Kima Greggs transfer back into the unit. Dozerman remains with the unit while Herc is suspended pending an internal investigations division investigation. As the season ends, a new investigative strategy is mapped out against Marlo.

=== Season five ===
After more than a year of investigation into the Stanfield Organization the unit still does not have a strong enough case to file charges. When budget cuts in the department eventually lead to the unit being closed down, Sydnor is disappointed to find his work wasted and realizes that simply keeping Marlo under surveillance was effective in reducing crime. Sydnor and Freamon are detailed to the State's Attorney's office to prepare the corruption case against Clay Davis. Sydnor and Freamon first prepare the paperwork on Davis and then assist Rhonda Pearlman in a series of Grand Jury depositions.

Sydnor uncovers evidence of Davis having committed a federal crime when he finds that Davis borrowed money from his mother for a mortgage deposit. Freamon realizes the significance of the crime and knows that it could mean a thirty-year jail term. The detectives present the evidence to State's Attorney Rupert Bond and he refuses to take the case federal as he wants to prosecute Davis himself for political reasons. In the series finale, Sydnor visits Judge Daniel Phelan in his chambers to apply back-channel pressure in order to advance an investigation, much like McNulty did in Season 1.
