= Jimmy McNulty =

Character from The Wire

- The Wire character
- Dominic West as Jimmy McNulty
- First appearance: "The Target" (2002)
- Last appearance: "–30–" (2008)
- Created by: David Simon
- Portrayed by: Dominic West

In-universe information
- Aliases: Jimmy; McNutty; Bushy Top; Jim
- Gender: Male
- Title: Detective
- Occupation: Major Crimes Unit Detective (Seasons 1, 3, 5); Baltimore City Homicide Detective (Seasons 1, 5); Baltimore Marine Unit (Season 2); Western District Patrolman (Season 4)
- Spouse: Elena McNulty (divorced)
- Significant other: Beadie Russell
- Children: Sean McNulty; Michael McNulty

James McNulty is a fictional character and one of the protagonists of the HBO drama The Wire, played by English actor Dominic West.

McNulty is an Irish-American detective in the Baltimore Police Department. While talented in his profession, McNulty's conceited belief that he is more intelligent than his peers and his willingness to ignore the chain of command in pursuit of his own investigative projects mean that he regularly incurs the wrath of his superiors.

When off the job, he has frequent problems involving alcoholism, alimony, child support, cheating and sexual promiscuity, and unstable relationships. He is central to many of the successful high-end drug investigations that take place within the series.

McNulty is loosely based on Ed Burns, co-writer of the series.

== Casting ==
British actor Ray Winstone was originally considered for the part. After the September 11 attacks in 2001, Winstone had difficulty returning to Britain for several weeks due to the subsequent grounding of flights, and dropped out of consideration once he was finally able to return home. Series creator David Simon next considered American actor John C. Reilly, but he declined because his wife did not wish to move to Baltimore.

For his audition tape, West was asked to record a scene between McNulty and his partner, Bunk Moreland. With only a day to record, and no one suitable to record with, he recorded himself reading his own dialogue and left gaps of silence for Moreland's dialogue, reacting appropriately. Simon described watching the tape with casting director Alexa L. Fogel: "We fell around the room laughing, like, 'What the...?'"

Despite the unusual tape, and West's dubious American accent, Simon found his ability to react to non-existent dialogue impressive. Fogel described West as "too young" and "too attractive" to play the character, but found that he understood McNulty's psychology. She took West to do a reading for Chris Albrecht, then the president of HBO Original Programming, who had final say on the casting. Albrecht assented, but told Fogel "You better be right."

== Character storyline ==
Of Irish Catholic descent, to the point he referred to Bushmills whiskey as "Protestant whiskey", McNulty grew up in the Lauraville neighborhood of Baltimore, Maryland. His father was an employee for Bethlehem Steel before being laid off in 1973. After a year of attending Loyola College in Maryland (now Loyola University Maryland), McNulty joined the Baltimore Police Department [EOD (Entrance on Duty) date April 5, 1994] when his girlfriend Elena (whom he later married on August 3, 1999) became pregnant.

He has two sons with Elena: Sean James (born on June 22, 1992), and Michael Barnes (born on November 3, 1993). In his first few years on the job, he proved himself as an effective patrolman in the Western District, under the command of Major Howard "Bunny" Colvin. McNulty spent four years in patrol at the Western District before becoming a detective and spending two years in the Escapes and Apprehensions Unit. After assisting Ray Cole in solving a homicide, McNulty was moved up to the Homicide Unit, where he was partnered with Bunk Moreland.

=== Season 1 ===
Before the start of the series, McNulty has noticed that drug kingpin Avon Barksdale is expanding his organization's territory, and that his gang has successfully beaten several murder prosecutions. After Avon's nephew D'Angelo is acquitted thanks to witness tampering, McNulty goes over the head of his superior, Major Bill Rawls, and convinces Judge Phelan to call Deputy Commissioner Ervin Burrell to encourage further investigation of the Barksdales.

Because of McNulty's efforts, the Barksdale detail is officially formed. It initially comprises narcotics lieutenant Cedric Daniels and his three detectives: Kima Greggs, Ellis Carver, and Thomas "Herc" Hauk. When Burrell asks his majors and shift lieutenants to send additional detectives for the investigative detail, McNulty is also assigned to the unit.

Daniels and McNulty argue about how to handle the case at their first meeting: McNulty, after seeing an FBI drug sting, suggests surveillance and wiretaps, but Burrell has ordered Daniels to put together a quick and simple case to appease Phelan. Soon after the investigation begins, McNulty learns from his friend in the FBI, Terence "Fitz" Fitzhugh, that Daniels had been investigated for having a suspiciously large amount of liquid assets. McNulty's relationship with Daniels continues to be complicated by their mutual distrust.

The detail is assigned as a prosecutor Assistant State's Attorney Rhonda Pearlman ("Ronnie"), with whom McNulty is having a casual sexual relationship. McNulty is officially separated from his wife, who limits his contact with his two sons, Sean and Michael.

While at the market with his sons one afternoon, McNulty spots Stringer Bell, Avon Barksdale's second-in-command, and sends his sons to tail him and get his license plate number. When Elena finds out, she seeks an emergency order to stop McNulty from seeing the boys. She is also angry that McNulty continues to see his affair partner, Ronnie Pearlman, casually.

Working on the Barksdale detail, McNulty becomes friends with Lester Freamon, who had previously been exiled to the pawn shop unit for 13 years and four months, as punishment for his insistence on charging a politically connected fence. Freamon often tries to temper McNulty's animosity towards Daniels. Frustrated that Barksdale's dealers do not use cell phones, they decide to clone the dealers' pagers instead. They also work together to convince Daniels to allow them to do better police work.

With the help of Kima, McNulty tracks down the elusive outlaw Omar Little, and gains Omar's respect and cooperation. Omar agrees to testify against Marquis "Bird" Hilton, a Barksdale soldier. His assistance also leads to McNulty's inadvertently solving one of Michael Santangelo's old cases; the grateful Santangelo in turn reveals that he is a mole for Rawls, who is looking for an excuse to fire McNulty.

Kima introduces McNulty to her confidential informant, Bubbles. When Kima is shot in a buy-bust sting operation gone wrong, McNulty is guilt-ridden, although even Rawls assures him that the shooting is not his fault.

McNulty has a frank discussion with Daniels in which he admits that the Barksdale case is no more than an exercise in intellectual vanity and an opportunity to demonstrate the BPD's shortcomings. Daniels tells him that everyone has known this all along, but the case has taken on meaning for those involved.

The detail succeeds in arresting Barksdale soldier Wee-Bey Brice for shooting Kima, Bird for murdering a state's witness, and both D'Angelo and Avon Barksdale. McNulty almost convinces D'Angelo to testify against Avon but at his mother's insistence, D'Angelo takes a 20-year prison sentence instead. When the Barksdale detail closes, Rawls reassigns McNulty to the marine unit, having learned from Sergeant Jay Landsman that this is precisely the BPD unit where McNulty would most hate to go due to seasickness.

=== Season 2 ===
While on harbor patrol, McNulty spots the body of a dead woman in the water. When Rawls argues the case is not in his jurisdiction, McNulty spends three hours poring over wind and tide charts to prove the death occurred within city limits.

When port authority police officer Beadie Russell finds 13 dead women in a shipping container on the Baltimore docks, McNulty again intervenes and, with the help of the medical examiner, proves that the deaths were not accidental: the air pipe to the container was deliberately closed off, and, with the help of a mining engineer, the investigators are able to prove that the ship was within the city limits when it happened. The case is given to Bunk and Lester, who don't look forward to investigating these difficult cases. This also angers Rawls because 13 unsolved murders (14 including the dead woman in the bay) ruins Homicide's clearance rate.

McNulty unsuccessfully searches for the identity of the floater. He also finds himself under pressure from Bunk to find Omar, since Bird is about to go on trial. McNulty coerces Bubbles into tracking down Omar, who successfully testifies against Bird who is convicted of murder and sentenced to life in prison.

Meanwhile, McNulty wants to salvage his marriage, leading him to sign a separation agreement with generous alimony as a gesture of good will towards his estranged wife so she will agree to get back together. He resolves to give up alcohol and detective work, two of the main reasons for the breakup of his marriage. When Elena confirms the marriage is over, he grows despondent and relapses.

When Daniels's unit is re-formed to investigate stevedore union boss Frank Sobotka, Rawls refuses to allow McNulty to rejoin the team, vowing he will remain working in the harbor for the rest of his career. McNulty seems to accept this with good grace but tries to help the detail unofficially. Daniels persuades Rawls to let McNulty return by agreeing to have his team take on the murders of the 14 women.

McNulty's first assignment is to go undercover as a client visiting a local brothel, where he scandalizes and amuses his colleagues by actually having sex with two prostitutes during the sting operation. He also flirts with Russell, who has been assigned to Daniels' detail, although he seems to shy away from a relationship.

While on surveillance, McNulty watches Spiros Vondas, an associate of an underworld figure known as The Greek, sending a text message. McNulty reasons that the time and location of the text could be used to retrieve it from the phone company's databases, and it is from this message that the detail learns the Greek had shut down his operations.

After McNulty learns from Bubbles that Stringer Bell and Barksdale rival Proposition Joe are sharing territory, he begins investigating them on his own time, convinced that he can gather enough evidence to prompt Daniels to focus the Major Crimes Unit's attention on Stringer.

=== Season 3 ===
McNulty continues to work with the MCU but is disappointed that their target is not Bell. He begins looking into the Barksdales anyway, finding out about D'Angelo's death and Avon's early release.

Investigating D'Angelo's death, which has been listed as a suicide, McNulty quickly realizes that D'Angelo was murdered. McNulty reconnects with Colvin to set up the Barksdale organization as the MCU's primary target. McNulty circumvents the chain of command again to set up the investigation, as Daniels is not interested in the quality of the unit's assigned case targets, blaming his rank in the department for his lack of case target interests. Angered by McNulty's attitude, Daniels makes it clear that he's forcing McNulty out when Stringer is arrested.

McNulty begins a casual sexual relationship with political consultant Theresa D'Agostino but ends it when he realizes that she is only interested in him physically and is pumping him for politically useful information about Colvin. Largely due to Freamon's work, the MCU implicates Stringer, but Stringer is murdered before McNulty can arrest him.

After Avon is arrested, Daniels reevaluates his decision to get rid of McNulty, but McNulty, thinking about something Freamon had remarked about to him earlier in the season, realizes he has no life outside his work and graciously declines Daniels' offer to keep him in the unit. He transfers to patrol in the Western District, which he remembers as the happiest time of his life, and begins a relationship with Russell.

=== Season 4 ===
McNulty moves in with Russell and her two children and enjoys his life as a patrolman in the Western District under Ellis Carver. McNulty's beat includes the corner that Bodie Broadus works on behalf of drug kingpin Marlo Stanfield. Both Daniels and Administrative Lieutenant Dennis Mello ask McNulty to do investigative work in the district, but he declines. Mello is disappointed, but Daniels realizes that McNulty has been able to get his life in order while working as a patrolman.

Although other officers make arrests for statistical purposes, McNulty focuses on quality arrests. This is exemplified by the arrest of two burglars who were stealing from churches.

McNulty mentors Brian Baker, a younger patrol officer in the Western District, whom he and Bunk end up referring to as "good police". McNulty also gives up drinking almost entirely, sometimes resolving to stay sober despite pressure from his friends. Bunk and Freamon are amazed and slightly dismayed at how much McNulty has changed, and Elena even expresses regret for having left him.

McNulty soon begins to miss the MCU and quietly begins getting closer to Bodie in the hopes of turning him into an informant against Marlo. After Stanfield lieutenant Monk Metcalf sees Bodie with McNulty, Marlo has Bodie killed as a precaution.

McNulty feels guilty and rejoins the MCU, much to Freamon and Daniels' delight. It is revealed during a scene shortly after Bodie's death that McNulty feels he "owes it to the kid".

=== Season 5 ===
With the BPD scaled back due to Mayor Tommy Carcetti's budget cuts and the vacant murders unsolved, McNulty is despondent and falls back into old habits. Shortly after being transferred back to Homicide, he visits the morgue, finds two county detectives arguing with the medical examiner, and subsequently learns that pre-mortem and immediate post-mortem strangulations are forensically indistinguishable. He applies what he learns to a probable overdose case he is investigating with Bunk, and tampers with the crime scene to make it seem that a struggle occurred, and over Bunk's protests, McNulty strangles and stages the corpse to make it appear as if a serial killer has come to Baltimore.

McNulty sets out on his ruse in the hopes that such a case will secure more funding for Homicide and the Stanfield investigation. Thus, he doctors case files and plants evidence in order to link cases together to create the impression of a serial killer targeting homeless men.

When Landsman ignores the case, McNulty approaches reporter Alma Gutierrez of The Baltimore Sun, but only succeeds in the story's getting printed in the middle of the paper instead of on the front page. Bunk repeatedly warns McNulty against this self-destructive course; Lester, enormously frustrated because he is close to solving the murders in the vacant houses but lacks funds to complete the task, approves of the endeavor and suggests that they sensationalize the killer to get the funds required to succeed in their crime solving.

When McNulty finds that most dead homeless men are concentrated in the Southern District, Freamon puts him in touch with an old patrol partner there who agrees to tip them off when new bodies are found. Freamon also devises a plan to show maturation in their serial killer's pattern, and acquires dentures to create bite marks on the victims, thus enhancing the media appeal for the story.

While canvassing an area frequented by the local homeless population, McNulty complains that Landsman barely noticed his work on the case, but Freamon reminds him that if their plan works, the case will attract more interest, and sloppiness could be their downfall. Upon returning home, McNulty is confronted by Russell about his drinking and philandering.

Upon finding a new body, McNulty mutilates the corpse to show bite marks and defensive wounds. When investigating the "homeless killer", McNulty and Greggs travel to the FBI Academy in Quantico, Virginia for assistance. McNulty realizes that he can no longer falsify the murders on real corpses as there is too large a police presence, so he instead takes a mentally ill homeless man off the streets and stages a photograph of a murder to send to Sun reporter Scott Templeton, before taking the man to a homeless shelter in Richmond with fake identification.

McNulty has been voicing the killer in telephone calls to Templeton. After doing the voice analysis, the FBI provides McNulty and Greggs with a psychological profile of the homeless killer, inadvertently giving a near-perfect description of McNulty himself. Having his character flaws spelled out for him gives McNulty second thoughts about what he has done. He confesses his deception to Greggs, who in turn informs Daniels, now the BPD's Deputy Commissioner for Operations. Daniels and Pearlman subsequently meet with Acting Commissioner Rawls, State's Attorney Rupert Bond, and the mayor's office. Daniels and Rawls confront McNulty, informing him that this will be his last CID case.

The case is "solved" when McNulty encounters a mentally ill homeless man who has started using the modus operandi of the phony serial killer. McNulty brings the man to justice, in his final case. McNulty and Freamon then leave the police department and the entire affair is swept under the rug, as revealing it will result in too many people getting into too much trouble, all the way up to the mayor's office and the chief of police.

After attending a detective's wake (for their careers) in their honor, McNulty leaves the bar sober and returns home, where he and Russell have reconciled. The next day, McNulty returns to Richmond, finds the homeless man he had put there, and drives him back to Baltimore. On the way back, he stops his car, gets out, and looks at the city, leading to the series-ending montage.

== Critical response and analysis ==
Jim Shelley of The Guardian found McNulty "irresistibly charming, a classic anti-hero, a modern-day Rockford." Also for The Guardian, Paul Owen commented that the season 1 episode "The Hunt" was the first to show "some pretty unsympathetic characteristics" of McNulty such as "sanctimonious and arrogant pronouncements". Jon Garelick of the Boston Phoenix remarked that McNulty is not precisely the central character despite his actions starting most of the plotlines, and wrote he preferred other characters to McNulty's “one-dimensional functionality as the Dirty Jimmy of the series”.

James Norton of Flak Magazine commented on how McNulty seems to fit to a standard police character archetype ("He has poor impulse control. He's personally fearless and outspoken, and he bangs babes like a hunchback rings bells...") but ends up subverting the archetype by being self-destructive and “kind of a jerk”.

Dan Kois of Salon described McNulty as "The heart, soul and oft-impaired nervous system of 'The Wire'", characterizing him as a central character. Kois also named McNulty's pride as his main character trait, noting this aspect of his personality made McNulty a successful investigator and a failure in most other aspects of his life.

Gillian Flinn of Entertainment Weekly observed McNulty offered one of the show's most wicked ironies: he is one of the characters you would expect to be on the side of law and order as a police detective but they describe him as a "boozing cop who pisses on authority and order."

== Origins ==
David Simon, the character's creator, has described his goal of presenting McNulty as ambiguous in his motivations. Based on his experiences with real detectives, Simon feels that most crime dramas present their police characters with the falsehood that they care deeply about the victims in the cases they are investigating. Simon states that in his experience, a good detective is usually motivated by the game of solving the crime—he sees the crime as an "insult to his intellectual vanity", and this gives him motivation to solve it.

The character was originally named Jimmy McArdle, but because no one liked the name, executive producer Robert F. Colesberry suggested renaming him Jimmy McNulty (after his maternal grandmother). The McArdle surname was reused for the character of "White Mike" McArdle in season 2.
