= William F. Zorzi =

American journalist and screenwriter (born 1954)

William Zorzi
- Born: William F. Zorzi Jr. 1954 (age 71–72)
- Occupations: Political reporter Television Writer
- Notable work: The Wire; Show Me a Hero

William F. Zorzi Jr. (born 1954) is an American journalist and screenwriter. He worked at The Baltimore Sun for almost twenty years and covered politics for the majority of his career. He has also written for the HBO television series The Wire and is the co-writer of the HBO miniseries, Show Me a Hero.

== Personal life ==
Zorzi is the son of reporter and public relations executive William F. Zorzi, Sr., and financial manager Mary Zorzi (née Fannon). He has three siblings, a brother and two sisters.

== Career ==
=== Journalism ===
He worked at The Baltimore Sun for almost twenty years and covered politics for the majority of his career. He has also covered the courts and the crime beat. As a reporter Zorzi has been described as tough and cranky and characteristically refused to accept free gifts (including food) from the politicians he was covering. He wrote a weekly column called "The Political Game" for five years in the mid nineties. He left reporting in 1998 and became The Sun's Weekend Metropolitan Editor. He later became Assistant City Editor.

=== Television ===
Zorzi had previously worked with television producer David Simon at The Sun. Zorzi worked for 13 years on the passion project that eventually became the 2015 HBO miniseries Show Me a Hero, which he created with Simon. The project was to be "about the volatile events surrounding a federal public housing desegregation case in Yonkers, NY." In 2001, Simon sent Zorzi, who at that time was assistant city editor at The Baltimore Sun, a copy of Lisa Belkin's book Show Me a Hero: A Tale of Murder, Suicide, Race, and Redemption, which he was taking to HBO as a potential project. In 2002, Zorzi quit his job at The Sun and began working on what became a long-term project. HBO had an option on the book, but it spent years in script re-writes with Zorzi as Simon and Zorzi were both busy working on other projects.

Zorzi had a brief cameo appearance in Simon's HBO crime series The Wire as a reporter in the 2002 episode "The Buys." Zorzi joined the crew of The Wire as a staff writer for the third season in 2004. Zorzi was hired to add authenticity to a new political story line. Fellow writer George Pelecanos commented that he knew that anything he wrote for the political story line would be extensively re-written by Simon and Zorzi. Zorzi was promoted to story editor for the fourth season in 2006 and made his television writing debut. He wrote the teleplay for the episode "Unto Others" from a story he co-wrote with producer Ed Burns. Zorzi and the writing staff won the Writers Guild of America (WGA) Award for Best Dramatic Series at the February 2008 ceremony and the 2007 Edgar Award for Best Television Feature/Mini-Series Teleplay for their work on the fourth season.

Zorzi returned as an executive story editor and writer for the fifth season in 2008. He also joined the cast as a fictionalized version of himself. He wrote the teleplay for the episode "Unconfirmed Reports" from a story he co-wrote with Simon. Zorzi and the writing staff were nominated for the WGA award for Best Dramatic Series a second time at the February 2009 ceremony for their work on the fifth season but Mad Men won the award.

=== Teaching ===
Following production of the fourth season Zorzi spent a year teaching Journalism at the Baltimore Freedom Academy, a public high school in the city. He also helped the school to launch a newspaper.

== Filmography ==
Production staff

Year	Show	Role	Notes
2008	The Wire	Executive story editor	Season 5
2006	The Wire	Story editor	Season 4
2004	The Wire	Staff writer	Season 3

Writer

Year	Show	Season	Episode title	Episode	Notes
2015	Show Me a Hero	1	"Parts 1 & 2," "Parts 3 & 4," "Parts 5 & 6"	1-6	
2008	The Wire	5	"Unconfirmed Reports"	2	Teleplay by Zorzi, story by Zorzi and David Simon
2006	The Wire	4	"Unto Others"	7	Teleplay by Zorzi, story by Zorzi and Ed Burns

== Awards ==
Year	Award	Category	Result	Work	Notes
2009	Writers Guild of America Award	Outstanding Dramatic Series	Nominated	The Wire season 5	Shared with Ed Burns, Chris Collins, Dennis Lehane, David Mills, George Pelecanos, Richard Price and David Simon
2008	Writers Guild of America Award	Outstanding Dramatic Series	Won	The Wire season 4	Shared with Ed Burns, Chris Collins, Kia Corthron, Dennis Lehane, David Mills, Eric Overmyer, George Pelecanos, Richard Price and David Simon
2007	Edgar Award	Best Television Feature/Mini-Series Teleplay	Won	The Wire season 4	Shared with Ed Burns, Kia Corthron, Dennis Lehane, David Mills, Eric Overmyer, George Pelecanos, Richard Price and David Simon
