= Scott Templeton =

Character from The Wire

- The Wire character
- Tom McCarthy as Scott Templeton
- First appearance: "More with Less" (2008)
- Last appearance: "-30-" (2008)
- Created by: David Simon
- Portrayed by: Tom McCarthy

In-universe information
- Gender: Male
- Occupation: Reporter at The Baltimore Sun

M. Scott Templeton is a fictional character on the HBO drama The Wire, played by actor Tom McCarthy. The actor joined the starring cast as the series' fifth season began.

== Biography ==
Templeton is a young reporter who allows his extreme ambition to lead him to falsify stories. He has previously worked at the Wichita Eagle and the Kansas City Star. Templeton sees his current job as a general assignment reporter at The Baltimore Sun as a stepping stone to The Washington Post or The New York Times. His prose is reflective of his personality, and is often overwrought and exaggerated. Templeton's style is welcomed by Managing Editor Thomas Klebanow and Executive Editor James Whiting.

=== Season 5 ===
Templeton is involved with breaking a story about a drug dealer making campaign contributions and receiving profitable property deals in return. He finds his role of preparing background information dissatisfying, and he speaks dismissively of the paper as a whole to his colleague Alma Gutierrez. Nevertheless, Templeton is eager to write a follow-up story and requests the assignment from City Desk Editor Gus Haynes. Haynes denies the request, as he has already given the story to city council reporter Jeff Price, but encourages Templeton to continue seeking stories.

Templeton is part of a team led by Executive Editor James Whiting planning a series of articles about the problems with education. Templeton wins favor with Whiting when he backs Whiting's philosophy that the piece requires little context and should remain tightly focused on the schools themselves. Haynes unsuccessfully argues the alternative position—that more context increases the relevance and effectiveness of any story.

Templeton is assigned the color story about the Baltimore Orioles' opening day game. He plans to write a story about a dedicated fan, but his canvassing does not garner anyone who fits that profile. When he returns to the paper he tells Haynes that his subject is a 13-year-old boy who uses a wheelchair and wanted to attend the game, but could not afford a ticket. Haynes is concerned by several of Templeton's claims, e.g., that the boy would only give his nickname ("E-Jay").

Haynes asks Templeton for more details, and Templeton claims E-Jay didn't want to give his name because he went truant from school in order to attend. He also says that E-Jay is an orphan who lives with his aunt in a neighborhood distant from the stadium and was disabled by a stray bullet. Haynes tries to verify the story by dispatching photographers to find the boy and checking the archives for a story about his original injury.

When unable to corroborate Templeton's story Haynes confronts him a second time, and Templeton says he resents the implication that his work was fabricated. Haynes is forced to run the piece when Whiting gives Templeton his full support.

Templeton also submits a story about a mother of four who has died of a toxic reaction to blue crabs. He claims the woman's sister is collecting for a fund to pay for the children's education.

When buyouts are announced at the paper, Templeton comments to his colleagues that he hopes they will get rid of some of the "dead wood" in the newsroom. Haynes is perturbed by the perceived insult to his friend, veteran police reporter Roger Twigg, who has accepted a buyout.

When Haynes gets news of a story about Police Commissioner Ervin Burrell's being forced to retire and replaced by Colonel Cedric Daniels, he offers the story to Templeton because of Twigg's impending departure. Templeton is not aware of Daniels, but Twigg recites a quick history of the subjects' careers and expresses an interest, so Haynes gives him the assignment, instead, and asks Templeton to canvass for react quotes to the story.

Templeton is seen not making phone calls and then submits an incredibly worded quote which he attributes to an anonymous source. Haynes is again dubious about the material and asks Templeton for his source. Templeton reluctantly credits the quote to City Council President Nerese Campbell and claims that Twigg is not the only skilled reporter in the newsroom. Haynes accepts the quote for the piece.

Templeton is pleased when he is offered an interview with The Washington Post and takes the day off to attend. When he first arrives he is eager to observe a budget meeting, but during the interview he becomes discouraged when his prose is described as overwrought, and he is unfamiliar with the stories that have most impressed the editors of the Post. They do not offer Templeton a position but do promise to keep his resume on file and ask him to reapply when he has more experience. As he leaves, Templeton's asked if he still wants to observe the budget meeting, but he now shows no interest in the meeting. Templeton returns to Baltimore disheartened.

Haynes asks Templeton to assist Bill Zorzi in catching them up on a missed story about a local corruption charges against State Senator Clay Davis. Templeton is assigned to contact State's Attorney Rupert Bond, and Haynes later praises his hard work in preparing the story in time for the next edition. Templeton admits to Gutierrez that he was unsuccessful in his job interview and reverses his position on The Sun, stating that it is not a bad paper.

Haynes is briefly impressed by Templeton when he hits the streets and writes an excellent profile of a homeless Iraq War veteran who suffers from PTSD incurred when an IED hit his patrol unit in Fallujah, Iraq.

Templeton also claims in the same episode to have checked on a fraud case, and Haynes later finds out Templeton's explanation for the story doesn't check out. The vet later comes in and says Templeton lied about his story as well, saying such things as the vet was in a Black Hawk Down-level firefight and saying they had coffee instead of chocolate milk.

Templeton says the vet has changed his story. To fact check it, Haynes goes to the Walter Reed Center in D.C. and talks to a wounded veteran who backs up the interviewed vet, saying he's not a liar.

Templeton continues to fabricate information for the fake serial-killer case which was actually hatched by McNulty to receive stronger government funding for his department. McNulty quickly catches on to Templeton's lies and privately tells him the truth before calling him out on his purposeless lies. In the end Haynes and Gutierrez both receive demotions for questioning Templeton's work and McNulty is forced to resign from police work, while Templeton wins a Pulitzer Prize for his "reporting" on the homeless in Baltimore.

== Origins ==
Critics have stated that Templeton is based on reporter Jim Haner. In January 2000, Haner wrote a story which the Sun retracted several days later due to inaccuracies. Show creator and writer David Simon, a former Sun reporter, stated that he believed that Haner invented quotes and events without punishment from his editors. Haner's work was supported by past editors, including William Marimow.

The character also appears to reference some famous cases of journalists falsifying stories to advance their careers, such as Stephen Glass at The New Republic, Janet Cooke at the Washington Post, and Jayson Blair at The New York Times.
