= List of blind people =

This is a list of notable individuals who were blind or became blind over the course of their lives. The list is organized into categories based on their notable achievements or contributions.

== Activists and organizers of the blind ==
- Tilly Aston – Australian educator, founder of the Victorian Association of Braille Writers.
- Louis Braille – French educator, known for Braille writing system.
- Tiffany Brar – Indian social activist, who founded the Jyothirgamaya Foundation, which empowers the blind in all spheres of life
- Molly Burke – Canadian, social media personality, corporate brand ambassador for blind representation in marketing.
- Francis Joseph Campbell – British-American anti-slavery campaigner and co-founder of the Royal National College for the Blind
- Haben Girma – American disability rights advocate, first deafblind graduate of Harvard Law School
- Kenneth Jernigan – American, long-time leader of the National Federation of the Blind.
- Helen Keller – American deaf-blind writer, lecturer, and activist.
- Juan Carlos González Leiva – Cuban lawyer, who founded the Fraternity of the Independent Blind of Cuba and the Cuban Foundation of Human Rights. He has been harassed, imprisoned and tortured by the communist regime.
- Judy Castle Scott – American, blind advocate and activist in the field of vision loss
- Sabriye Tenberken – German, Braille Without Borders co-founder.

== Adventurers ==
- Miles Hilton-Barber – British traveler and climber.
- James Holman – British man known as the "Blind Traveler."
- Tofiri Kibuuka – Ugandan-Norwegian athlete. One of the first three blind people to reach the summit of Mount Kilimanjaro (along with John Opio and Lawrence Sserwambala). First African competitor at the Winter Paralympic Games.
- Takeichi Nishi – Colonel in the Imperial Japanese Army During World War II. Commander of the 26th Tank Regiment in the Battle of Iwo Jima. He was blinded during battle.
- Erik Weihenmayer – First blind person to reach the summit of Mount Everest.

== Artists ==
=== Acting and performing ===
- Jack Birkett – Also known as "Orlando" and "The Incredible Orlando"; camp actor, dancer, mime. Best known for his roles as Borgia Ginz in the Derek Jarman film Jubilee, and as Caliban in Jarman's version of The Tempest. Though his best-known and most prominent roles have been with Jarman, he has had roles in other films, including 1984's The Bride and in televised productions of William Shakespeare.
- Dana Elcar – Played Peter Thornton (MacGyver). He lost his vision during this time and it was written into the character's story.
- S. Robert Morgan – A recurring role in The Wire.
- Callan Mulvey – An actor seen in various series (Rush and in movies like Batman v Superman: Dawn of Justice) has lost the sight in one eye during an accident.
- Geraldine Lawhorn – One-woman show performer in New York City.
- Tommy Edison – Person known as the "Blind Film Critic", being blind since birth.
- Skyler Davenport – Played a visually impaired teenager who is housesitting for a wealthy client when three criminals break into the house to rob it for the film See for Me.
- Dionne Quan – Voice actress who is legally blind from being born with Optic Nerve Hypoplasia, her known roles are Kimi Watanabe Finster from Rugrats, and Trixie Tang from The Fairly OddParents.

=== Music ===
- Robin Millar – Record producer, Businessman and philanthropist.
- Tsutomu Aragaki – Japanese tenor, blind from just after birth.
- Garret Barry – an Irish uilleann piper, among the most famous players of the 19th century.
- Delta Blind Billy – an American Delta blues artist and outlaw.
- Blind Blake – American blues and ragtime singer and guitarist.
- The Blind Boys of Alabama – Gospel group.
- Andrea Bocelli – Operatic pop singer.
- Ricky Boon – Former guitarist of Australian thrash metal band Fury.
- Joséphine Boulay – French organist and composer.
- Rudolf Braun – composer and organist.
- Pearly Brown – American gospel blues singer and guitarist, known primarily as a street performer.
- Henry Butler – American jazz and blues pianist.
- Blind James Campbell – American blues singer and guitarist.
- Henry Caldera – Sri Lankan singer/songwriter, blind since age 14.
- Ray Charles – pianist and singer inducted to various halls of fame.
- Fanny Crosby – Christian hymn writer.
- Reverend Gary Davis – gospel blues guitarist.
- Blind John Davis – American blues and boogie-woogie pianist and singer.
- Kimio Eto – Japanese blind musician who played the koto.
- José Feliciano – Grammy Award-winner.
- Five Blind Boys of Mississippi – The original line-up of this gospel group was blind, some later members were not.
- Blind Boy Fuller – Blues guitarist and vocalist.
- Blind Leroy Garnett – American boogie-woogie and ragtime pianist and songwriter.
- Terri Gibbs – country music singer and musician.
- Blind Roosevelt Graves – American blues guitarist and singer, who recorded both sacred and secular music in the 1920s and 1930s.
- Geoffrey Gurrumul Yunupingu – indigenous Australian singer-songwriter.
- Diana Gurtskaya – pop singer from the ex-Soviet country of Georgia
- Ed Haley – Appalachian old-time fiddler.
- Casey Harris – keyboardist of X Ambassadors.
- Jeff Healey – Blues-rock guitarist and vocalist.
- Al Hibbler – Jazz pop vocalist.
- Patrick Henry Hughes – multi instrumental musician, recipient of Extreme Makeover: Home Edition.
- Blind Lemon Jefferson – "Father of the Texas Blues".
- Blind Willie Johnson – Slide guitarist who's been termed "influential" and "the apogee" for the instrument.
- Terry Kelly – Canadian singer.
- Rahsaan Roland Kirk – Jazz multi-instrumentalist.
- Lachi – Visually impaired Nigerian American singer-songwriter, pianist and composer out of New York City
- Francesco Landini – 14th century Italian composer and organist.
- Rachael Leahcar – Australian pop singer and songwriter, born with retinitis pigmentosa and is legally blind.
- Blind Willie McTell – Blues guitarist.
- Raul Midón – Singer-songwriter.
- Ronnie Milsap – Country and pop singer.
- Moondog – Outsider musician born "Louis Thomas Hardin."
- Joe Mooney – American jazz and pop accordionist, organist, and vocalist.
- Blind Mississippi Morris – American blues musician.
- Turlough O'Carolan – harper and composer blinded by smallpox.
- Ginny Owens – American contemporary Christian music singer, songwriter, author and blogger, born with poor vision and has been blind since the age of three.
- Jay Owens – American electric blues and soul blues guitarist, singer and songwriter.
- Frankie Paul – a Jamaican dancehall reggae musician.
- Jerron "Blind Boy" Paxton – American blues and jazz vocalist and multi-instrumentalist.
- Paul Pena – American blues musician and throat singer.
- Blind Alfred Reed – American folk, country, and old-time musician and singer-songwriter.
- Blind Joe Reynolds – American singer-songwriter and blues guitarist.
- Joaquín Rodrigo – Spanish composer and pianist.
- Diane Schuur – Grammy winning jazz singer.
- Charlotta Seuerling – Swedish concert singer.
- George Shearing – British jazz pianist.
- Tom Sullivan – American musician, author and motivational speaker. The 1982 film If You Could See What I Hear is based on his autobiography.
- Blind Joe Taggart – American country blues and gospel singer and guitarist who recorded in the 1920s and 1930s.
- Bertha Tammelin – a Swedish actress, operatic mezzo-soprano, pianist, composer and drama teacher.
- Art Tatum – Grammy Lifetime Achievement Award and DownBeat Jazz Hall of Fame, partial sight in one eye.
- Sonny Terry – American Piedmont blues and folk musician.
- Lennie Tristano – DownBeat Jazz Hall of Fame, critics choice.
- Ostap Veresai – Noted kobzar.
- Helmut Walcha – German organist, who recorded the complete organ works of Bach.
- Blind Willie Walker – an American Piedmont blues guitarist and singer.
- Doc Watson – guitarist in several genres.
- Blind Tom Wiggins – an American pianist and composer, he had numerous original compositions published and had a lengthy and largely successful performing career.
- Stevie Wonder – singer-songwriter, multi-instrumentalist, and Rock and Roll Hall of Fame and Songwriters Hall of Fame inductee.
- Ravindra Jain – Indian poet and musician, composed several Hindi film songs in 1970s and 1980s.
- Âşık Veysel – Turkish poet and musician, considered as the father of Turkish folk music.

=== Visual artists ===
- Esref Armagan – Turkish painter, born blind.
- John Bramblitt – American painter & writer, lost sight in 2001, paints realistically through touch techniques with intense color.
- Keith Salmon – English painter & sculptor, blind through diabetes retinopathy.

=== Writers ===
- Homer – Ancient Greek orator of the epic poems Iliad and Odyssey. According to legend, he was blind either at birth or due to disease or injury.
- Ludwig von Baczko – German writer and historian.
- Jorge Luis Borges – Argentine writer blind in later part of his career.
- Didymus the Blind – Ecclesiastical writer of Alexandria.
- John Lee Clark – American deafblind poet.
- Belo Cipriani – Latino writer, blind at the age of 26.
- Morrison Heady – deafblind author and inventor
- James Jerpe – Sports writer.
- Ed Lucas – Sports writer.
- John Milton – Poet who was blind for the last 22 years of life.
- Helen Keller – American writer who was both blind and deaf.
- Ved Mehta – an Indian/American writer who was born in Lahore (now a Pakistani city) to a Hindu family.
- Nikolai Ostrovsky – a Soviet socialist realist writer.
- Aldous Huxley – British philosophical writer, partially blind.
- Taha Hussein – Egyptian writer and intellectual who became blind at the age of three.
- Jack Vance – American fantasy writer

=== Other ===
- Richard Turner – Close-up card magician

== Athletes and sportspersons ==
- Zeeshan Abbasi – Blind cricketer.
- Muhammad Akram – Blind cricketer, holds the record for highest individual score in a Blind T20I
- Lisa Banta – Goalball player.
- Anthony Clarke (athlete) – World class Judoka.
- Chris Holmes (swimmer) – He has won multiple Paralympic gold medals for swimming.
- Cedric Jones – American football player, blind in one eye.
- Masood Jan – Blind cricketer, holds the record for highest individual score in a Blind ODI
- Shekhar Naik – Blind cricketer.
- Jake Peavy – Former Major League Baseball pitcher, legally blind without corrective lenses
- Marla Runyan – Legally blind Olympic and Paralympic runner.
- Suranga Sampath – Blind cricketer.
- Zohar Sharon – Blind golfer.
- Crazzy Steve – Professional Wrestler signed to Impact Wrestling who is legally blind due to congenital bilateral cataracts
- Henry Wanyoike – Long-distance runner with 95% vision loss.
- Trischa Zorn – Swimmer who's the most successful athlete in the history of the Paralympic Games.

== Engineers ==
- John Metcalf – English civil engineer.
- T. V. Raman – Indian computer scientist.
- Ralph Teetor – American engineer, who invented the cruise control.

== Mathematicians and scientists ==
- Amy Bower – American oceanographer
- Kent Cullers – American astronomer
- Gustaf Dalén – Swedish inventor and Nobel Prize winner; continued to make inventions and lead his company after being blinded in an accident
- Wanda Díaz-Merced – American astrophysicist
- Victor Eberhard – German geometer
- Leonhard Euler – Swiss mathematician and physicist; went almost totally blind at age 59
- Florence Goodenough (1886–1959) – American psychologist; went blind in late life, then learned braille so she could continue publishing
- François Huber – Swiss naturalist who made fundamental contributions to melittology.
- Joshua Miele – American adaptive technology designer
- Mona Minkara – American chemist
- Bernard Morin – French topologist
- Abraham Nemeth – Developed Nemeth Braille for blind students in science and math
- Joseph Plateau – Physicist who went blind at forty-two when he gazed too long at the sun
- Lev Pontryagin – Soviet mathematician who went blind at fourteen; continued mathematical study with the help of his mother Tatyana Andreevna, and made major discoveries in a number of fields of mathematics
- Nicholas Saunderson – English mathematician who went blind at the age of twelve months, held in high esteem by Isaac Newton.
- Geerat J. Vermeij – Dutch-born American evolutionary biologist and paleontologist; went blind at the age of three
- Galileo Galilei – Italian astronomer and physicist; went blind at 74, six years before his death

== Medical professionals ==
- Dr. Satish Amarnath – an Indian medical microbiologist who became totally blind after an acid attack.
- Jacob Bolotin – the world's first totally blind physician fully licensed to practice medicine.
- Tim Cordes – American physician.

== Politicians ==
- Abdurrahman Wahid – otherwise known as Gusdur – 4th president of Indonesia.
- Richard H. Bernstein – Elected to Wayne State University Board of Governors in Michigan.
- David Blunkett – Labour Party (UK) politician, former cabinet minister, and Member of Parliament.
- Kristen Cox – Cabinet secretary in Utah and Maryland.
- Matthew A. Dunn – Member of the United States House of Representatives.
- Henry Fawcett – Member of Parliament and Postmaster General of the United Kingdom.
- Ian Fraser, Baron Fraser of Lonsdale – MP for St Pancras North for eleven non-consecutive years, blinded in World War I.
- Thomas Gore – US Senator.
- Cyrus Habib – 16th Lieutenant Governor of Washington.
- Colin Low, Baron Low of Dalston – Member of the British House of Lords.
- Robert Mahoney – First blind member of the Michigan House of Representatives
- George May, 1st Baron May – Member of the British House of Lords.
- Floyd Morris – President of the Senate of Jamaica
- David Paterson – Governor of New York.
- Bob C. Riley – An acting governor of Arkansas.
- Thomas D. Schall – A US Senator from Minnesota, blinded by an electrical shock before his time in office.
- Yuriy Shukhevych – People's Deputy of Ukraine, former head of Ukrainian National Assembly – Ukrainian National Self Defence.
- Doug Spade – Member of the Michigan House of Representatives

=== Political activists ===
- Shelley Davis – American lawyer and labor advocate.
- Chen Guangcheng – Lawyer and Ramon Magsaysay Award winner was imprisoned in China on 22 April 2012, Chen escaped from house arrest.
- Jacques Lusseyran – French author and political activist during World War II.
- Karla Gilbride – American civil rights litigator currently serving as the General Counsel of the U.S. Equal Employment Opportunity Commission

== Rulers ==
- Shah Alam II – Emperor of India
- Louis the Blind – 10th century European king, blinded after being captured.
- Vasily II of Russia – the 15th century Grand Prince of Moscow
- Béla the Blind – the 12th century King of Hungary
- Enrico Dandolo – 12th and 13th century 42nd Doge of Venice
- John of Bohemia – King of Bohemia, died at the Battle of Crécy (1346)
- George V of Hanover – King of Hanover in the 19th century (1819)

== Saints ==
- Didymus the Blind – Dean of the Theological School of Alexandria and first man to memorise the Holy Bible
- Lutgardis – Catholic saint, blind in the last 11 years of her life.
- Margaret of Castello – a 13th - 14th century Italian Catholic educator and Dominican tertiary, born blind.
- Pacificus of San Severino – Franciscan visionary.
- Surdas – Hindu saint, devotional poet and singer who lived during reign of king Akbar (1542–1606).

== Diplomats ==
- Victoria Harrison – UK Ambassador-designate to Slovenia.
- Saima Saleem – Pakistani diplomat.
- Beno Zephine N L – Indian Foreign Service officer.

== Others ==
- Ibn Baz – Grand mufti of Saudi Arabia (1993–1999).
- Srikant Bolla – Founder and CEO of Bollant Industries.
- Ashish Goyal – first blind trader in finance.
- Christine Hà – Winner of MasterChef USA 2012.
- Mary Ingalls – sister of Laura Ingalls Wilder, author.
- Sheena Iyengar – Professor at Columbia Business School
- Akbar Khan – Singer, Composer, Writer and a Banker honored with National Award in 1989, Rajasthan, India.
- Jim Knipfel – journalist, autobiographer, and novelist who got blind later in his life.
- Ross Minor – accessibility content creator, shooting survivor, para swimmer
- Gary O'Donoghue – political correspondent for the BBC.
- Mélanie de Salignac – discussed by Diderot.
- Russell Redenbaugh – blinded as a teenager, graduated from Wharton with an MBA, Self-Made Wall Street and Silicon Valley Millionaire, BBJ Black Belt Three Time Masters Champion
- Yousaf Saleem – Pakistani jurist.
- Richard B. Teitelman – Justice of the Supreme Court of Missouri
- Ed Walker – lifelong radio show host/humorist, Washington, DC.

== Fictional ==
=== Literature ===
- DeLacey – an old blind man in Frankenstein who cannot see the monster so isn't prejudiced by his sight, and offers the only genuine friendship the monster has ever experienced.
- Quasimodo – In The Hunchback of Notre-Dame, a hunchback, is half-blind, and becomes deaf due to his living in the bell tower of the cathedral.
- Zatoichi – A blind masseur and swordsman created by Japanese novelist Kan Shimozawa.
- Phillip Enright – Main character of The Cay who becomes temporarily blind due to a concussion.
- Tahl – A love interest of Qui-Gon Jinn, was rendered blind after being held captive. However, with the use of the Force, she was able to compensate for her blindness.
- Halcyon "Hal" Green – a character from the short story "The Diary of Luke Castellan" of the Percy Jackson & the Olympians series, was a blind seer who antagonist Luke Castellan befriended long before his fall from grace.
- Hazel Grace Lancaster, Augustus Waters, and several other characters in The Fault in our Stars, a book is about characters with several types of cancer and resulting disabilities including a blind character and one with a prosthetic leg.

=== Comics and Manga ===
- Daredevil – Blind Marvel Comics superhero.
- Reader – a blind Inhuman who has the ability to make anything he reads manifest into reality. His fellow Inhumans decided to remove his eyes, fearing the potential of his powers. Instead, Reader learned to use his powers via Braille.
- André Grandier – In Rose of Versailles, later losing sight in his left eye and his condition slowly worsens until he is completely blind.
- Terezi Pyrope – from Homestuck, a main character in the webcomic, who is blind, but can process the world through scent and taste.
- Shizuka Yakou – In The Invisible Man and His Soon-to-Be Wife, a quiet, blind. and bashful woman who works at a small detective agency, and uses a white cane when walking.

=== Cinema ===
- Selina D'Arcey – In A Patch of Blue, a blind character played by Elizabeth Hartman.
- Susy Hendrix – In Wait Until Dark, a blind character played by Audrey Hepburm.
- Mr. Will – In Places in the Heart, a blind character played by John Malkovich.
- Nick Parker – In Blind Fury, a blind character played by Rutger Hauer.
- Frank Slade – Main character of the movie Scent of a Woman who lost his sight by showing off juggling live grenades.
- Garrett – from Quest for Camelot, a love interest of Kayley, was rendered blind after being struck accidentally by a horse during a stable fire. He uses the skills he learnt from Ayden, a silver-winged falcon, to survive whilst living in the Forbidden Forest.
- Ivy Elizabeth Walker – In The Village, a blind character played by Bryce Dallas Howard.
- Chirrut Îmwe – a blind fortune teller and member of the Force sect Guardians of the Whills, appearing in the film Rogue One: A Star Wars Story.
- Norman Nordstrom – A veteran of the Gulf War who was blinded by a shrapnel. Also simply known as "The Blind Man", he is the antagonist of the horror film Don't Breathe and the protagonist of its sequel Don't Breathe 2.
- Sophie Scott – In See for Me, a blind character played by Skyler Davenport.

=== Television ===
- Master Po – from the Kung Fu TV series.
- Geordi La Forge – was blind since birth, but uses a VISOR and later ocular implants that allow him to see the electromagnetic spectrum. The character was created by Gene Roddenberry – a positive role model for disabled people.
- Snap – A character from ChalkZone
- Butchie – In The Wire, a blind character who is portrayed by a blind actor, S. Robert Morgan.
- Toph Beifong – from the show Avatar: The Last Airbender was born blind, but uses her Earthbending abilities to sense vibrations and "see" things that are in contact with the earth. For this reason, she hates flying and sailing, as she lacks contact with the ground and is truly blind.
- Hanne – In Doctor Who, a blind character played by Ellie Wallwork.
- Isobel Reilly – In Home Fires, a blind character played by Gillian Dean.

=== Video Games ===
- Jerec – A character from Star Wars Jedi Knight: Dark Forces II who served Emperor Palpatine as an Inquisitor. A Miraluka, he was born without eyes and instead uses the Force to see.
- Kenshi Takahashi – A blind swordsman and Special Forces operative with telekinetic abilities from the Mortal Kombat series.
- Wu Zi "Woozie" Mu – from Grand Theft Auto: San Andreas, a blind Triad gang leader whose lack of sight is compensated for by his heightened other senses and streak of luck. He becomes an ally of Carl Johnson throughout the middle third of the game following a street race between the two, eventually making him a partial owner of his casino in Las Venturas.
- Snake – from Zero Escape, a blind man forced into a Nonary Game.

=== Music ===
- Tommy – titular character of the album of the same name by The Who. His blindness, along with his deafness and muteness, are actually psychosomatic.
