= Fredericka Foster =

American artist, curator, and activist

- Born: Seattle, Washington
- Education: B.A., University of Washington, Factory of Visual Arts
- Occupations: artist, activist, curator
- Known for: painting, photography, curating The Value of Water, at The Cathedral of Saint John the Divine, New York, and starting Think About Water, a collective of ecological artists and activists
- Spouse(s): Bennett M. Shapiro, MD
- Website: http://www.frederickafoster.com/, https://www.thinkaboutwater.com/

Lake Union, 2013, 42 x 64," oil on canvas, by Fredericka Foster

Fredericka Foster is an American artist, curator and water activist known for her work in oil painting and photography, with a focus on water-related themes. She has been recognized as a River Warrior by the Lewis Pugh Foundation for her efforts in raising "awareness about water's profound impact on our socio-economic, environmental, and subconscious realm."

== Early life and education ==
A graduate of the University of Washington, Foster studied and served as an instructor at the Factory of Visual Arts, a professional art school that provided an alternative to conventional university art education in Seattle.

== Art career ==
Foster's work as a painter centers on water; she uses her art to examine its impact on people's lives, subconscious, and the environment. She initially gained recognition for her photography, particularly her candid portrayals of older couples "at ease in aging skin." Foster has exhibited her work since the late 1970s. In the 1990s, her paintings and installations were influenced by the AIDS epidemic, focusing on themes of healing and mortality.

Known as an accomplished colorist who uses a limited palette and multiple layers of paint, Foster works in "the romantic landscape tradition of Dove, Hartley, Burchfield and O'Keeffe." Art critic Carter Ratcliff notes, although "labeled a realist, a recorder of visible facts, she turns out to be a visionary."

Her artistic practice is influenced by Buddhist philosophy and practice, as demonstrated in her public discussions that explore the relationship between Buddhist practice and art, including conversations with composer Philip Glass. Their dialogue was later used as the basis for Play with Time, a music theater work written by Eric Henry Sanders and presented by the Tanglewood Learning Institute, an initiative by the Boston Symphony Orchestra that aims to enhance the cultural and educational offerings at Tanglewood, in August 2025. The work, described as “poetic” and producing “a nearly out of body sensation” evoked “Samuel Beckett’s Waiting for Godot.”

Foster has exhibited her work in numerous solo and group shows in the United States and Europe. Her solo exhibitions include five Water Way shows at the Fischbach Gallery in New York City, and an exhibition with an accompanying lecture at the Beacon Institute for Rivers and Estuaries. Notable group exhibitions include The Flag Project for the inauguration of the Rubin Museum of Art, and two exhibitions at the Cathedral of Saint John the Divine: the "groundbreaking" The Christa Project: Manifesting Divine Bodies on the feminine divine, and the Value of Sanctuary: Building a House Without Walls, all in New York City.

In 2022, Foster participated in the "I AM WATER" juried exhibition by Ecoartspace, which featured her oil painting Molten Sea on a billboard in Manhattan. She has also been in exhibitions at ecoartspace in New Mexico, including ecoconsciousness (2020) and Earthkeepers Handbook (2023). In New York, her work appeared in Scape - Land City, Sea and Sky in Southold (2022), and for East End Arts in Riverhead, Detour IV (2023), and at their Hamptons Fine Art Fair booth in Southampton (2024.)

"Molten Sea" billboard on 46th Street at the West Side Highway in Manhattan for ecoartspace's I AM WATER 2022 exhibition.

Foster and artist Hilda O'Connell contributed to Art Beyond Sight's publication Art Beyond Sight: A Resource Guide to Art, Creativity, and Visual Impairment, an educational book and compact disk designed to provide visual experiences to individuals with impaired sight and blind artists. A corresponding video, Art Beyond Sight: A Demonstration of Practical Techniques, was co-produced with the Museum of Modern Art.

Her work is held in private and public collections including the Garrison Institute, Artsbridge and the Lambertville Chamber of Commerce, Commerce Bancshares, Merck and Company, Microsoft Corporation, and General Electric.

=== Curator ===
Foster is also known for her role curating and participating in the "monumental" exhibition, The Value of Water at the Cathedral of Saint John the Divine in New York City, where the "cathedral staff are to be congratulated for having the vision to raise the funds and commission so ambitious an exhibition from so clearly competent a curator." The largest exhibition to ever appear at the cathedral, it anchored a year long initiative by the cathedral on our dependence upon water. Over forty artists were featured, including Jenny Holzer, Robert Longo, Mark Rothko, William Kentridge, April Gornik, Kara Walker, Kiki Smith, Pat Steir, Edwina Sandys, Alice Dalton Brown, Teresita Fernandez, Eiko Otake and Bill Viola.

In April 2023 Foster curated The Rivers exhibition which complemented the Pathways to Planetary Health Initiative hosted at the Garrison Institute. Ten artists affiliated with Think About Water (see below, Activist) collaborated to underscore the imminent threats confronting freshwater ecosystems.

=== Activist ===
In the 1970s, Foster observed the situation of the Duwamish people along the Duwamish River in Seattle. The Duwamish, who had historically inhabited the area, faced challenges when the government condemned their houseboat residences and adjacent ancestral lands. Foster supported their peaceful protests by participating in a letter-writing campaign. This led to collaborations with artists, scientists, and non-profit organizations to raise awareness about water-related issues, including environmental concerns, pollution, and climate change. Her work often involves interdisciplinary approaches to address these topics. Foster has been interviewed for her role as a cultural activist and has also lectured on art and activism.

To educate about the water crisis and water scarcity, she presented her work to two hundred and fifty scientists, staged a performance based on the 2017 sewage spill into Puget Sound at the Sage Assembly 2017, Exploring a Catastrophe to Water Through Science and Art; and conducted an exhibition and talk at the Beacon Institute for Rivers and Estuaries. Like a Circle in Water, part of the Elements video series commissioned by the Buddhist Tricycle Foundation in 2014, was an official selection of the Awareness Festival and Blue Ocean Film Festival.

=== Think About Water Artist Collective ===
Foster founded and curates Think About Water, an artist collective of ecological activists which spotlights their work using water as their subject or medium. Members include indigenous water protectors Charlotte Coté, and Dr. Kelsey Leonard; Basia Irland, Aviva Rahmani, Betsy Damon, Diane Burko, Leila Daw, Stacy Levy, Meridel Rubenstein, Rosalyn Driscoll, Doug Fogelson, Giana Pilar González, Rachel Havrelock, Susan Hoffman Fishman, Fritz Horstman, Sant Khalsa, Ellen Kozak, Anna Macleod, Ilana Manolson, Lauren Rosenthal McManus, Randal Nichols, Dixie Peaslee, Jaanika Peerna, Aviva Rahmani, Lisa Reindorf, Naoe Suzuki, Linda Troelle, Leslie Sobel and Adam Wolpert.

== Selected bibliography ==
- Tara Lohan, ed. (2010). Water Matters: Why We Need to Act Now to Save Our Most Critical Resource. AlterNet Books; Washington (DC). ISBN 978-0-9752724-8-0.
- Deloris Tarzan Ament, ed. (2010). Iridescent Light: The Emergence of Northwest Art. University of Washington Press, P. 8.
- Simon Winchester; Katherine Anne Paul (2010). The Flag Project - Contemporary Artists Celebrate the Opening of a New Museum. Rubin Museum of Art.
- Elisabeth Salzhauer Axel; Nina Sobol Levent, eds. (2003). Art Beyond Sight: A Resource Guide to Art, Creativity, and Visual Impairment. Art Beyond Sight, American Foundation for the Blind, Art Education for the Blind.

== Films ==
- Like a Circle in Water, Part of the Elements series, commissioned by the Tricycle Foundation, directed by Andrew Chan Gladstone; summer, 2014; official selection: The Awareness Film Festival, Los Angeles, California; and the Blue Ocean Film Festival, St. Petersburg, Florida.
- Mary Mary, Foster and Christopher Young, 1999; official selection: Northampton Independent Film Festival, Short Program #4: Surreal Reels and the Seattle Underground Film Festival.
- The Spiritual Journey: Interfaith Perspectives, Foster paintings shown throughout, Galen Films/Romano Productions, presented to the Parliament of the World's Religions by the Auburn Theological Seminary and the Temple of Understanding, 2000.

== Awards ==
- 1998, The Inn at Phillips Mill award, Phillips Mill Photographic Exhibition; New Hope, Pennsylvania
- 1993, First prize, National Polaroid Transfer Exhibition; Kirkland, Washington
- 1989, Grand prize, Harvest of Arts, Bellevue, Washington; Second prize, Pacific Northwest Arts and Crafts Fair, Bellevue, Washington
- 1981, Second prize, Heart of the City, Seattle, Washington
