= Blind artists =

People who are physically unable to see normally but work in the visual arts

Blind artists are people who are physically unable to see normally, yet work in the visual arts. This seeming contradiction is overcome when one understands that only around 10% of all blind people can see absolutely nothing at all. As such most blind people can in fact perceive some level of light and form, and it is by applying this limited vision that many blind artists create intelligible art. Also, a blind person may once have been fully sighted and yet simply lost part of their vision through injury or illness. Blind artists are able to offer insight into the study of blindness and the ways in which art can be perceived by the blind, in order to better improve art education for the visually impaired.

== Education ==
Art education was an integral part of many of the earliest institutions for the blind, with the motivation for their curriculum being largely religious. For instance, industrial art education was introduced into the earliest English and Scottish asylums by their Protestant Christian founders from 1791. This curriculum was believed to provide religious enlightenment, and allow asylum residents to work their way to heaven. What can be referred to as fine art education for students who were blind or visually impaired was first recorded in Vienna by the educationalist Johann Wilhelm Klein. Klein trained people who were blind to carve crucifixes which, he believed, would prevent his students falling prey to what he felt was sexual deviance.

There was no widespread fine art education in schools for the blind until the latter years of the 20th century, and even when it was introduced many felt people who were blind could not draw or paint only sculpt or mold. Subsequently, there were many instances of the exclusion of students who were blind or visually impaired in the early years of the 21st century.

Despite little inclusion of formal art education in schools for the blind, there were courses, tours and exhibitions on the fine arts for people who were blind or visually impaired from the early years of the 20th century. Although, like art education in schools for the blind, these courses were not widespread until the latter years of the 20th century. Through the work of people such as the Austrian teacher Viktor Lowenfeld, Professor John Kennedy from University of Toronto, Rebecca Maginnis from the Metropolitan Museum of Art, Barry Ginley from the Victoria & Albert Museum and organisations such as Art Beyond Sight, BlindArt and Blind with Camera since the latter years of the 20th century, there has been a significant uptake of fine art education by museums. This education has included well established courses and tours, verbal imaging, audio tours and audio description. Notable examples of museum inclusion can be found at the Metropolitan Museum of Art, the Victoria & Albert Museum, the Wallace Collection, and the Museum of Modern Art.

More recently there have been regional and national initiatives to create a Community of Practice for museum professionals, designed to help these professionals share their expertise and experience in the field. An example of such an initiative is the Sensing Culture Community of Practice, founded in 2018.

There are a number of publications that promote or discuss blind education programs, seek to show how art can be constructive for the blind and those with visual impairments, and show the ways in which people who are blind or visually impaired can be taught to create art.

Elisabeth Salzhauer Axel's book Art beyond sight: a resource guide to art, creativity, and visual impairment covers a variety of different subjects like the meanings of making art, art theory and verbal description. The book gives different suggestions about how the blind can actually go about making art; there is an example of one woman who is not completely blind but severely impaired who, when sculpting something, finds it easier to close her eyes and feel the material and the shape rather than trying to see it with her imperfect vision, much like a completely blind person would. The book emphasizes the importance of touch and feeling when creating art without sight.

The book, Drawing and the Blind: Perceptions to Touch, by John Kennedy, focuses on the ways in which the blind, both young and old, can perceive pictures and 3D objects. According to Kennedy, visually impaired people are able to feel a 3D object and then create a drawing of the object that can be easily recognized by a sighted individual. Kennedy likens the drawings of the average blind-since-birth person to those of a sighted child. He notices that blind children are much more willing to attempt to draw than blind adults who have no prior experience. Kennedy discusses the fact that the blind can perceive a drawing made of raised lines, as well as 3D objects that have shape and form.

The book, Arts Culture and Blindness, by Simon Hayhoe, presents a social study of arts students who are visually impaired and blind in situ, their understanding and practice of the visual arts and their reaction to the attitudes of their teachers, past and present. It analyses the topic of the culture of education, the effects of this culture on blindness and the visual arts and introduces an inclusive model of studying blindness and visual arts. In researching the material for Arts, Culture, and Blindness, Simon Hayhoe collaborated with internationally renown charities in the area of blindness, galleries, exhibitions and art, such as Art Education for the Blind, New York and BlindArt, London.

The book, Blind Visitor Experiences at Art Museums, by Simon Hayhoe, examines the question, Why would a person who is blind want to visit an art museum, even when he or she cannot touch the exhibits? The book features a study at the Metropolitan Museum of Art, New York, and presents case studies of visitors who are blind and visually impaired, teachers at the museum and blind artists, such as Esref Armagan. Through this study, the book examines philosophies of exclusion and access, and argues there is an extra dimension to understanding the visual arts by people who are blind or visually impaired. This dimension can, "act as a bridge between the awareness of art works through perception, and an understanding of their contents beyond perceptual knowledge. This bridge between awareness and non-verbal knowledge is described as an ambience that is provided by the environment and context of knowing art works. This ambience is felt in museums, galleries and monuments, and is made possible by the visitor's proximity to art works."

Blind or visually impaired artists work in a variety of different media, and are by no means limited to only one type of art. The website for the Blind Artist's Society contains a page where blind artists can display their work, and some types of work include nature/ landscape painting, physical models, wood carvings, portraits, abstract paintings, watercolor paintings, and drawings. Many are able to create realistic artwork through the use of light/shadows and perspective in their work.

Textile Needle Arts such as machine sewing, hand sewing, braided rugs, needle felting, knitting and crochet are other mediums a visually impaired artist may use. Experienced Needle Artists who have recently lost vision can continue to pursue their textile art/craft using a few adaptive blind techniques.

== Contributions to the study of visual impairments ==
The ways in which the visually impaired are able to create art are giving new insights into the study of sight loss. For example, Ann Roughton is a landscape artist experiencing Macular Degeneration. Her paintings not only include what she can see with her partial vision, but her work also includes the grey haze that she sees in the center in her vision as a result of her Macular Degeneration. In doing so, she is literally painting sight, giving a new perspective on sight loss.

== Organizations ==
There are many organizations around the world that offer assistance to the blind. There are also some that offer assistance and support specifically for blind artists.

One example of these organizations in the United States is the Blind Artists Society, a support group for visually impaired amateur artists. Founded in 2007, the organization is funded by the Retina Research Foundation and seeks to provide an environment where artists can gather to display and sell their art, communicate with other artists and receive support. The organization also organizes periodic exhibitions of the work of blind artists.

== Notable examples ==
- John Bramblitt is an American blind painter and first blind muralist.
- Eşref Armağan is a Turkish artist born without eyes.
- Keith Salmon is a visually impaired artist working in Ayrshire, Scotland.
- Giovanni Gonnelli, blind Italian sculptor of the 1600s.
- Michael Naranjo blind Native American sculptor lost eyesight in battlefield in Vietnam.
- Gordon Gund American sculptor lost his sight from retinitis pigmentosa (RP)
- John Dugdale is a photographer who has lost most of his eyesight to CMV retinitis.

== See also ==
- Blind photography
