= Susan Hoffman Fishman =

American painter, environmental artist, and writer

- Known for: Painting, environmental art, mixed media, activism
- Movement: Environmental art
- Website: www.susanhoffmanfishman.com

Susan Hoffman Fishman is an American painter, mixed-media and environmental artist, writer, and climate activist whose work explores the relationship between water, climate change, and humanity’s disconnect with the environment. Integrating painting, collage, and cyanotype, she often draws on satellite imagery and environmental data to depict the fragility of the earth. Her practice joins visual art, writing, and activism in response to ecological loss and community resilience.

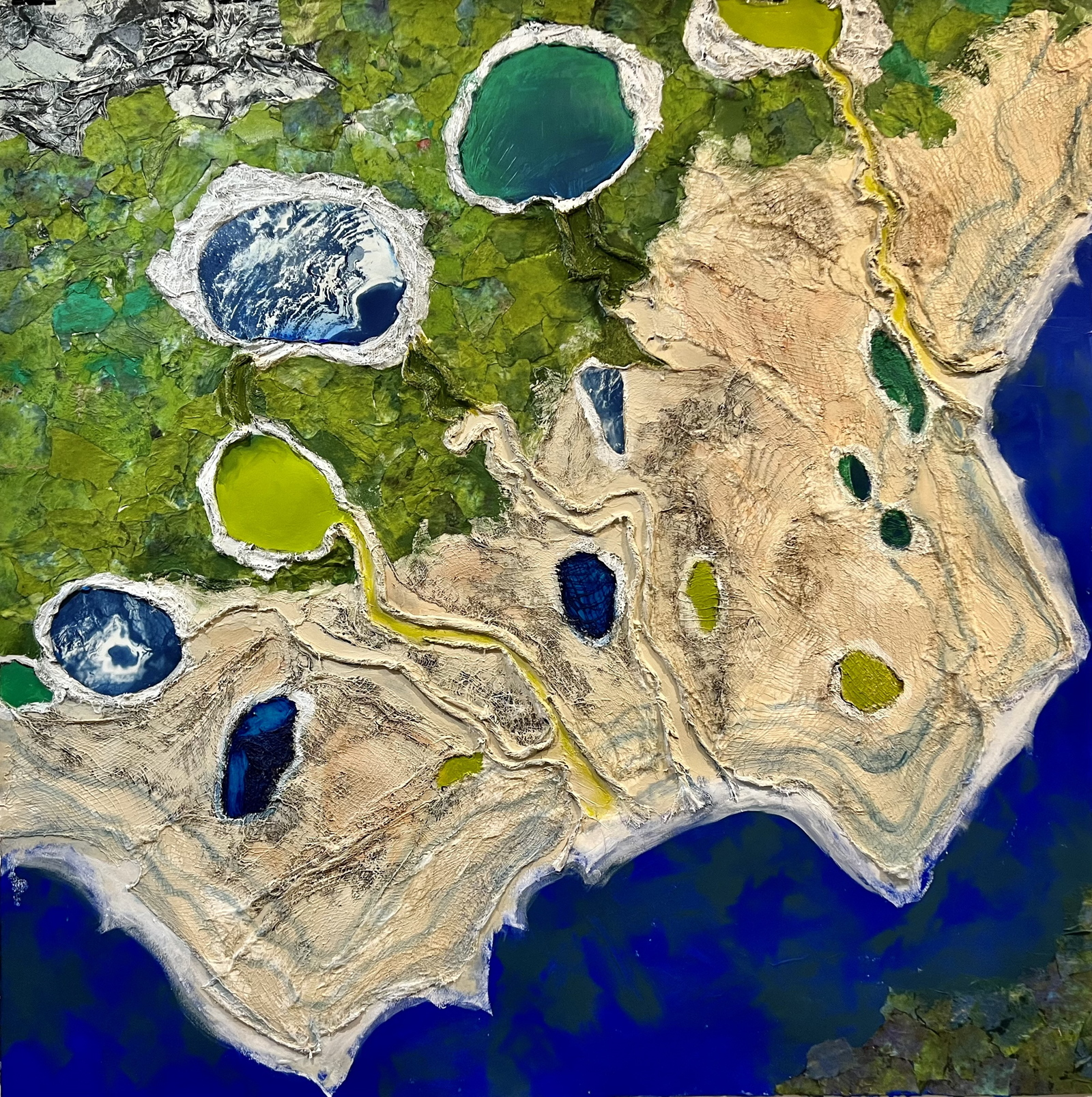
The Earth is Breaking Beautifully VII: Dead Sea Sinkholes (2023) by Susan Hoffman Fishman — acrylic, oil pigment sticks, satellite images, cyanotype and mixed media on paper, 51″ × 51″.

== Work ==
In the 1980s Fishman exhibited widely, combining mixed media and narrative imagery to examine social change. A 1988 review noted her “consistent progress and a respectable maintenance of cutting-edge content,” describing her paintings as both experimental and political. In 1987 and 1988 The New York Times' coverage placed her among artists addressing social themes and civic engagement.

During the 2010s her work shifted toward environmental issues, particularly water and climate change. The traveling, interactive exhibition The Wave (2011–2017), co-created with Elena Kalman, encouraged participants to consider how water binds global communities. Commissioned by the Peabody Essex Museum in Salem, Massachusetts, the project traveled to twenty-four indoor and outdoor venues, including the Wadsworth Atheneum, New Britain Museum of American Art, Hartford’s Bushnell Park in Connecticut, as well as sites in Massachusetts, Maryland, and New York City. It was also presented at the National Aquarium in Baltimore for World Oceans Day in 2013. Its form and meaning evolved at each site: in Salem it was part of The Ripple Effect: The Art of H2O, while in Hartford it symbolized the return of water to Bushnell Park as part of the city’s iQuilt Plan. Fishman described the installation as shaped by public participation, noting that “none of this, we did—it’s all come from the community.” This participatory project marked her transition from social commentary to ecological inquiry. In 2017 the William Benton Museum of Art presented Unfiltered: An Exhibition About Water, where her paintings Water Wars, and Rising Tides, addressed water scarcity and floods.

In Turning Tides (Torpedo Factory Art Center, 2022), curated by Diane Burko, Mark Jenkins described her contribution as reflecting “the devastating effects of human interference.” In Mayday! EAARTH (Ceres Gallery, 2022), her aerial views of Dead Sea and Siberian terrains, showing sinkholes from permafrost melt and water extraction, use color that makes the land appear “riven with pain.” Her imagery was described as “hovering between abstraction and landscape,” using shifting perspectives to evoke ecological instability. Fishman collaborated with artists Krisanne Baker and Leslie Sobel on the multimedia installation Flood 2.0 (Five Points Arts Center, Torrington, Connecticut, and Ely Center of Contemporary Art, 2022), developed during a residency at the former, which combined projected video, an original Greek chorus, a suspended boat and scrolls to evoke rising waters and collective resilience. The installation linked future apocalyptic flood projections with the Biblical flood narrative.

Fishman’s Dead Sea paintings were included in the Yale Institute of Sacred Music exhibition Biophilia: In Excelsis (2024). Critic Eleanor Heartney wrote in the catalog that they “document the unsettling radiance of sinkholes, balancing beauty with ecological warning." Across her work, she draws on myth and ritual to reflect on humanity’s relationship with a planet in flux. Her installation In the End, a Devastating Beauty, (Stand4 Gallery, 2024) with Leslie Sobel, was described as "a meditation on the Anthropocene, where data becomes emotion." They developed the project during a joint artist residency at Planet Labs, a global satellite imaging company that created its residency program to explore what would happen when artists were given access to its scientists and satellite resources. Fishman noted that the Dead Sea changes visible in their imagery were so dramatic that even the geologist she was working with was astonished. The Tale of Lost Waters (Five Points Arts, 2025) continues this investigation, depicting bodies of water that have receded or vanished, documenting a global geological disaster. It was described as a meditation on what is disappearing and an appeal to attend to what is being lost and remembered, a “ritual for mourning."

== Activism ==
Fishman’s activism includes collaborative, community-based projects. Earlier civic involvement included projects at Hartford’s Charter Oak Cultural Center, noted in a feature on the synagogue’s revitalization as a community arts space. In 2016 Fishman and Kalman created Open House: Hartford at the Charter Oak Cultural Center, a participatory installation addressing homelessness. This evolved from an earlier version shown at Stamford Government Center and reflected themes of safety, belonging, and shelter. In April 2016 Fishman installed The Wave outside the Connecticut State Capitol during protests over a proposed deal to sell discounted water from the Metropolitan District Commission to Niagara Bottling Company, describing its message as all people are interconnected by our need for water.

Fishman is a founding member of the international artist cooperative Think About Water. In 2024 she participated in Exquisite River at the Ely Center of Contemporary Art on their collaborative exhibition on rivers.

In 2025 the Adaptation and Sustainability Committee of the United Nations Framework Convention on Climate Change produced a video presentation that examined Fishman’s visual documentation of shrinking lakes and permafrost sinkholes within a broader discussion of artists addressing the climate crisis. In the video, she observed that “Art has the unique ability to confront overwhelming subjects like climate change and stimulate difficult conversations.”

== Writing ==
From 2017 to 2022 Fishman wrote the monthly column Imagining Water for Artists & Climate Change, examining the work of artists worldwide whose practices center on water and climate change. Image Journal published her 2024 essay “Imagining Water: Myth, Ritual, and a Changing Planet,” about artists who expressed their anxiety about the future of the planet by creating work that is a form of prayer. In interviews she has said that “my belief in the power of art to effect change is stronger than it was when we first talked,” linking her studio practice to direct advocacy.

== Collections ==
- William Benton Museum of Art, University of Connecticut — The Wave (2018, with Elena Kalman). Polycarbonate and recyclable plastic on nylon string. A commissioned installation. Waiting Room III (1992). Mixed media on paper, 40 1/4 x 26 1/2 in. (102.2 x 67.3 cm). The Esther and James Barnett Collection of American Paintings.
- Climate Art Collection — The Dead Sea: Then and Now (2023). Acrylic, oil pigment, satellite images, cyanotype, and mixed media on panel, 18 x 18 in.
