= Not for Attribution =

- The Wire episode
- Episode no.: Season 5 Episode 3
- Directed by: Scott Kecken; Joy Kecken
- Story by: David Simon; Chris Collins
- Teleplay by: Chris Collins
- Original air date: January 20, 2008
- Running time: 58 minutes

Episode chronology
| ← Previous "Unconfirmed Reports" | Next → "Transitions" |

"Not for Attribution" is the third episode of the fifth season of the HBO original series The Wire. The episode was written by Chris Collins from a story by David Simon & Chris Collins and was directed by Joy Kecken and Scott Kecken. It aired on January 20, 2008.

== Plot ==
They're dead where it doesn't count.

— Fletcher, Not for Attribution

A withdrawn Michael is persuaded to take a trip to Six Flags America with Dukie and Bug. The three boys have a fun day at the park, although Michael is later reprimanded by Monk for leaving his corner. Continuing his efforts to create a fake serial killer and draw funding for the police, McNulty falsifies a connection between two old cases involving homeless victims and the corpse which he had earlier staged. The plan fails when both the media and his superiors are uninterested. Bunk remains outraged at McNulty's plan and, after several attempts to talk him out of it, enlists the help of Freamon. However, this tactic backfires when Freamon makes suggestions to improve McNulty's plan by sensationalizing the killer.

Elsewhere, Deputy Commissioner Stan Valchek leaks rising crime statistics to Mayor Carcetti and makes an appeal to be appointed as interim commissioner should Burrell be fired. When Burrell delivers manipulated statistics, the mayor finally has the political ammunition he needs to fire him. Carcetti plans to replace Burrell with Daniels, which his aide Norman Wilson leaks to The Baltimore Sun. Pearlman presents evidence before a grand jury seeking an indictment against Senator Davis on corruption charges. Davis' former driver, Damien Price, testifies under subpoena about the $20,000 in drug money he was arrested with by Daniels' detail. Davis tries desperately to convince Burrell and Carcetti to protect him.

At the Sun, Alma is disappointed when her story on the deadly home invasion doesn't make the front page. The paper copes with budget cuts by offering reporters "buy-outs" to leave their jobs. Templeton, upset that outgoing crime reporter Roger Twigg was given the story on Daniels' promotion, produces a strongly worded "react" quote implicating him in deposing Burrell. When Daniels learns of the quote, he is alarmed that Burrell may use information about his past corruption. Meanwhile, after Vondas rejects Marlo's monetary gift as figuratively and literally "dirty", Marlo seeks help from Proposition Joe in both obtaining fresh bank bills and laundering his money through Caribbean-based charities. Marlo visits the Antilles after Joe helps him with his financial requests, but Joe does not help him find Omar. Marlo then gives a second, clean gift to The Greeks.

In spite of being told by Joe that he fears Omar's return to Baltimore, Cheese gives Partlow information on the location of Omar's mentor Butchie in return for Marlo's $50,000 bounty. Partlow and Snoop torture and execute Butchie after killing his bodyguard and shooting Big Guy in the leg, thus ensuring that their actions will reach Omar.

== Production ==
=== Guest stars ===
- Frankie Faison as Ervin Burrell
- Paul Ben-Victor as Spiros "Vondas" Vondopoulos
- Robert F. Chew as Proposition Joe
- S. Robert Morgan as Butchie
- Delaney Williams as Jay Landsman
- David Costabile as Thomas Klebanow
- Sam Freed as James Whiting
- Bruce Kirkpatrick as Roger Twigg
- Maria Broom as Marla Daniels
- Al Brown as Stanislaus Valchek
- Donnell Rawlings as Damien "Day Day" Price
- Anwan Glover as Slim Charles
- Method Man as Melvin "Cheese" Wagstaff
- Felicia Pearson as Felicia "Snoop" Pearson
- Michael Stone Forrest as Frank Barlow
- Todd Scofield as Jeff Price
- Brandon Young as Mike Fletcher
- Lenny Hamm as Homicide Detective
- Ramon Rodriguez as Renaldo
- Gregory L. Williams as Michael Crutchfield
- Donald Worden as Donald Worden
- Damon Henderson as Pastor
- Thuliso Dingwall as Kenard
- Kwame Patterson as Monk Metcalf
- Edward Green as Spider
- Keenon Brice as Bug
- Dominick Cicco as Andreas
- Sarah Desage as Bank Teller
- Michael Rivera as Renaldo's friend
- Baye C. Harrell as Hack driver
- Kristian King Lewman as Assistant Medical Examiner Diane Lerner
- Eric Messner as Alma's Boyfriend
- Joey Perillo as Medical Examiner
- Tracey Teague as McNulty's date
- Vincent M. Ward as Butchie's Bodyguard
- John Brennon as Banker #2
- Gary D'Addario as Gary DiPasquale
- Sarah Grace Hart as Six Flags girl #1
- Christine Lee as Store Clerk
- Jim Scopeletis as Banker #1
- Sophia Wang as Six flags girl #2

=== Uncredited appearances ===
- Robert Poletick as Steven Luxenberg
- Derrick Purvey as Big Guy
- Kara Quick as Rebecca Corbett
- Steve Luxenberg as Sun staff member
