= Janki Goud =

Indian judoka

Personal information
- Born: Jabalpur, Madhya Pradesh, India

Sport
- Country: India
- Sport: Judo
Medal record
Women's Judo
Representing India
Judo Championship
Bronze medal – third place	IBSA Judo Asian & Oceanian Championships	–

Janki Goud is an Indian judoka. As of August 2018, she has been reported to be 23 years old. She won the bronze medal at the 2017 Asian and Oceania Judo Championships, held in Uzbekistan.

== Early life ==
Janki lost her sight at the age of 5, after contracting measles. She received judo and self-defence training from Sightsavers, a nongovernmental organization.

== Awards and Recognition ==
She won a bronze medal at the 2017 Judo Asian & Oceania Championship held by the International Blind Sports Federation at Tashkent, Uzbekistan. She was congratulated by chief minister Shivraj Singh Chouhan in a tweet.

In 2016 and 2017, she won silver and gold medals respectively at the 4th and 5th National Judo Championship for Deaf & Blind. She won the gold medal at the 6th National Blind and Deaf Judo Championship, held in Lucknow, Uttar Pradesh in February 2018.

== See also ==
- List of Indian sportswomen
- List of blind people
