= Sargy Mann =

British painter (1937–2015)

- Born: Martin Oliver Henson Mann; 29 May 1937; Hythe, Kent, England
- Died: 5 April 2015 (aged 77); Suffolk, England
- Occupation: Painter
- Known for: Painting while being blind

Martin Oliver Henson Mann (29 May 1937 – 5 April 2015), known as Sargy Mann, was a British painter. Over the course of his career, Mann's subject matter featured both landscapes and portraiture. Mann began to lose his eyesight in 1973. An avid painter, he was undeterred by his failing vision and as such he continued to find new ways of seeing as his artistic career progressed.

== Early life, education and teaching ==
Sargy Mann was born in Hythe, Kent, in 1937, son of Stanley Mann and Mary B. (née Kent) Mann. He was first educated at Dartington Hall School, where he developed a keen interest in maths, physics and sports, and was given his nickname. At 16, he moved to Oxford to become an apprentice in the Morris Motors factory, where his love for jazz led him to play in a band with Dudley Moore and others. Mann enrolled at Hammersmith Polytechnic in London in 1958 and was accepted into the Camberwell College of Arts. Mann went on to teach at both Camberwell and the Camden Arts Centre until 1988 and his lessons focused on the transformative powers of light and colour.

== Painting career ==
In 1963, Mann had his first exhibition. His painting Karen I was featured in the Contemporary Portrait Society show on Bond Street. His commercial success was slow, though, and he returned to Camberwell in 1967 to become the first ever postgraduate student in their painting school. Mann moved to Tottenham Court Road in 1964, where he lived with a number of creative individuals who pushed his artistic boundaries. He then in 1967 moved into the house of friends Elizabeth Jane Howard and Sir Kingsley Amis in Hertfordshire. Mann spent all of his free time painting in their garden. He lived among these friends until 1976, when he married friend and former student Frances Carey. It was around this time that he began to question the limits of typical vision.

Early collectors of his work included Dame Iris Murdoch, Sir John Betjeman and Cecil Beaton. Poet Laureate Cecil Day-Lewis and his son Daniel Day-Lewis lived alongside Mann in the Amis's house Lemmons for some time, and Daniel Day-Lewis went on to become an avid fan and collector of Mann's work. Day-Lewis has said of Mann's work: "There is a freedom in his work, which only one with a supreme mastery of structure, light and colour could ever afford."

In 1973, Mann exhibited at the Salisbury Festival of Arts, organized by Elizabeth Jane Howard and Geraint Jones. The exhibit featured his "Lemmons bathroom" works, depicting the room of his friends' home. The show was met with success, and was proceeded with his "sketchbook" collection.

In 1994, Mann served as co-curator for the Bonnard at le Bosquet exhibition at the Hayward Gallery in London. Throughout the 1990s, he served as a visiting lecturer in Italy at the Verocchio Art Centre, and in England at the Royal Drawing School.

In 1990 Mann moved with his wife and his four children to Suffolk, where he lived until his death in April 2015. Celebrities and key art collectors worldwide have acquired Mann's work.

== Sight and style ==
Mann's sight started to deteriorate in 1973. At 36 years of age, he developed cataracts in both eyes, followed by retinal detachments. Despite cataract surgery, retinal detachments and burst corneal ulcerations left one eye nearly blind, followed years later by a total loss of vision. He was officially registered blind in 1988. It was at this point that Mann gave up his teaching career, now well protected by commercial success.

Without his vision, Mann was forced to find new ways to approach painting. In the 2014 BBC News documentary on him, Mann describes the process of learning "how to reinvent painting for myself." He first used a specifically modified telescope to enlarge images in the better eye. Mann created form and composition through touch, employing strategically placed lumps of Blu-Tack and rubber bands to map out his canvases. His wife Frances, also an artist, assisted him by mixing the colours.

Mann's technique changed not only in the physical sense of painting but also in his cognitive process of creating images. His memory and imagination became his vision, replacing straightforward observation, and his paintings celebrate this subjectivity. His son Peter created a documentary about his father's adaptive techniques. The restrictions imposed by the reality of vision no longer applied to him, and he remarked that he had complete creative liberation. "I chose the colour chord for each painting intuitively, thinking in an overtly decorative way which, before, I would never have allowed myself to do. It seems that blindness has given me the freedom to use colour in ways that I would not have dared to when I could see."

The colours featured in Mann's work reflect the stages of his changing vision and the effects of each eye operation. His first cataract operation left "his brain dazzling with blue light." One eye saw differently from the other, and suddenly Mann was experimenting with single-eye versus double-eye vision.

Before the onset of his blindness, Mann considered himself primarily a landscape painter. Following his loss of vision, however, he became more oriented toward portraiture, as the depth is more easily comprehended of figures.

== Success after blindness ==
After losing his sight, and prior to his death in April 2015, Mann painted his wife, Frances, whom he "saw" through touch. In his artist statement, he recalled his method for seeing: "As I tried to understand her position and the chair in my totally blind state, by touch alone, I found that my brain… was busy turning this three dimensional understanding into the view that I would have seen, and the two dimensional pattern this would give."

== Media coverage ==
Mann has been the feature of a number of documentaries. In 2006, son Peter Mann created a documentary of his life, entitled Sargy Mann. The video is accompanied by a book, co-written by Peter and Sargy Mann, entitled Sargy Mann: Probably the Best Blind Painter in Peckham. Mann was also featured on the BBC News in 2014, in the story "Blind painter Sargy Mann: Painting with inner vision".

A number of interviews and stories have also investigated his storyn. An October 2006 piece, "Ways of Seeing" by Virginia Boston appeared in Artists and Illustrators Magazine. On 21 November 2010, reporter Tim Adams of The Observer wrote "Sargy Mann: the blind painter of Peckham". In March 2013, Laura Barber published an interview in Port Magazine, entitled "10,000 Hours: Sargy Mann". Mann's painting "See the Girl with the Red Dress On" was featured on UN Stamps for the 2013 "Breaking Barriers" Collection. (Mann was one of six artists chosen for the collection.)

Most recently, Sargy Mann is featured in the BBC interactive project, The Story of Now. The "art" section of the interactive film follows his artistic journey.
