= Maurice Hilton-Barber =

South African military personnel

Lt. Col. Maurice Clinton Hilton-Barber, DFC, OBE (8 August 1912 – 11 August 1975) was a South African wing commander in the South African Air Force during World War II.

== Biography ==
Hilton-Barber was born in Craddock, the son of Harry Atherstone Hilton-Barber and Celia Andrews. Barber served during World War II in 250 Squadron of the RAF on the Western front in 1942. He went on to command 450 Squadron of the RAAF from November 1942 until March 1943. Although it was considered to have achieved 5 wins, it seems that this total is only 3. He received a DFC in February 1943 and was transferred to the SAAF with the rank of lieutenant colonel. After the war, he became the Federal Director of Civil Aviation in Southern Rhodesia.

His two brothers, Roger and Harry, were also fighter pilots. He had two sons, Miles and Geoff, who went blind from a genetic condition but became adventurers.

== Awards ==
- Distinguished Flying Cross on 23 February 1943 as Acting Squadron Leader of the No. 450 (RAAF) Squadron, Royal Air Force
- Officer of the Order of the British Empire (OBE), 1962 Birthday Honours

== Distinguished Flying Cross citation ==
Barber's official DFC citation says:

During operations in the Western Desert this officer displayed great skill and unflagging devotion to duty. As flight and squadron commander his steady judgment and high morale proved a tower of strength. In 1 flight during the battle of El Alamein, Squadron Leader Barber destroyed 3 Junkers 87's. His example has been worthy of high praise.
