= Simon Hayhoe =

- Born: UK
- Citizenship: British
- Education: Birmingham University, UK (PhD)
- Known for: Visual Art and Blindness; Disability Arts; Cultural Anthropology of Disability and Museums, Inclusive Technical Capital; Inclusive Technology
- Scientific career
- Fields: Education; Blindness; Disability; Museums; Philosophy; History of Education; Visual Arts
- Workplaces: University of Exeter, UK; University of Bath, UK; Canterbury Christ Church University, UK; Sharjah Women's College, United Arab Emirates the Metropolitan Museum of Art, United States; Institute of Education, University of London, UK; Birkbeck, University of London, UK; University of Toronto, Canada; London School of Economics and Political Science, London University, UK
- Doctoral advisor: Professor John Hull

Simon Hayhoe is the author of twelve books on topics ranging from visual impairment and the arts, access to public spaces and the philosophy of social research. His books include The Psychology of Blindness and Visual Culture, Principles and Concepts of Social Research, Emancipatory and Participatory Research for Emerging Educational Researchers, An Introduction to Grounded Methodology for Emerging Educational Researchers, Grounded Theory and Disability Studies, Accessible Vacations two travel guides on visiting public spaces in the US for older people and people with disabilities, Cultural Heritage, Ageing, Disability, and Identity, which features case studies of the Statue of Liberty, Yosemite National Park, Boston Museum of Fine Art, Blind Visitor Experiences at Art Museums, which features a study of the Metropolitan Museum of Art, New York City, Arts, Culture and Blindness on arts education and visual impairment, Philosophy as Disability & Exclusion and God, Money and Politics, these latter two books were the first books on the history of English education of the blind since 1910.

Hayhoe's work on the history and epistemology of visual impairment is the subject of numerous international academic courses, including PSYC54 Cognition and Representation at the University of Toronto, THST 422a: Senses in the Museum and Theater at Yale University, amongst a number of others. In addition, his writing has been the topic of discussion on BBC Radio 4 in the UK and syndicated radio in the US, news articles in the US, and a theatrical installation project in London by Extant and the Open University.

== Current and recent work ==
Simon Hayhoe is currently an associate professor of special educational needs, disability and inclusion at the University of Exeter, a centre research associate in the Centre for the Philosophy of Natural and Social Science, London School of Economics and an associate of the Scottish Sensory Centre, University of Edinburgh. Through these posts he continues to research and teach participatory and grounded methodology, and epistemology of disability and ability, with special reference to education, inclusion, technology and the arts. Hayhoe's other research interests include inclusive and assistive technology, mobile technology and disability, religion and disability - with a focus on Christianity and Islam - and museums and disability. He was also a partner of an international project investigating the use of mobile technologies as a tool of inclusion for disabled people in museum environments. This project is sponsored by a Horizon 2020 grant from the European Union. The research was partnered with TreeLogic (based in Madrid), the Open University, and national museums in London, Madrid and Vienna.

Over the past fifteen years, Hayhoe has conducted projects in the field of disability and cultural and artistic inclusion in the US, Canada, United Arab Emirates, Spain, Austria, Republic of Ireland, Russia, Mexico and the UK. He has also presented his research and writing on inclusive capital, inclusive technical capital, the epistemology of disability, and passive & active exclusion to further educational conferences and expositions in Europe, North America, the Far East / East Asia and the Middle East.

== Other publications and awards ==
Hayhoe's articles on disability and blindness appear in works such as the American Foundation for the Blind's Art Beyond Sight, the Encyclopedia of American Disability History, Global Sustainable Communities Handbook, and Learning in a Digitalized Age, The Routledge Handbook of Visual Impairment and The Routledge Handbook of Disability Arts, Culture, and Media amongst others. In addition, his articles appear in special issues of Optometry and Vision Science (the official journal of American Academy of Optometry), the Harvard Educational Review, the British Journal of Visual Impairment, the Society for Disability Studies' Disability Studies Quarterly, and the National Federation of the Blind's Journal of Blindness Innovation and Research amongst others. He is also a consultant and chair of the Educational Psychology Research Group for Art Beyond Sight (New York, USA), the Beyond Sight Foundation (Mumbai, India), co-editor of the Routledge book series Qualitative and Visual Methods in Educational Research and the editor of the on-line knowledge base ECO: On Blindness and the Arts, which was contributed to by authors such as the neurologist Oliver Sacks and the blind artist Eşref Armağan.

Hayhoe has also won a number of awards in his field, including a Fulbright All Disciplines Scholar's Award to conduct a fellowship at The Metropolitan Museum of Art (New York, USA) and he was a finalist in the London 2012's Great Briton's Prize. He has also delivered guest lectures at the Institute of Child Health Great Ormond Street Hospital/University College London, Harvard University, the London School of Economics, MIT, UC, Berkeley, Vrije Universiteit Brussel, the Government of the Province of Milan, Italy, v-a-c Foundation, Moscow, and St Petersburg State's Manege Central Exhibition Hall, Russia, amongst others.
