= Satish Amarnath =

Indian microbiologist

- Occupations: Head, Quality Compliance and Outreach Services, Manipal Hospitals
- Spouse: Jyotsna.

Satish Amarnath is a Medical Microbiologist associated with Manipal Hospitals. He works as the Coordinator for distance education in Allied and Sciences, Quality Management Representative for Manipal for the ISO certification, Advisor in Microbiology and Chairman of the Manipal Infection Control Committee. He is acclaimed for his passion for his work despite having zero vision.

== Personal life ==
Amarnath was brought up in Bangalore. He is married to Jyotsna and the couple have a daughter and a son.

=== Acid attack and vision loss ===
On 5 September 1998, two unidentified people threw sulfuric acid on his face as he stepped out of a tailor shop. The incident burnt his face and blinded him for life. Eight reconstructive surgeries were performed on his face. Despite the harrowing experience, he was back to work on the 40th day of the incident.

== Professional life ==
After finishing his ICSE exams, Amarnath enrolled for B.Sc. in Botany and Zoology St Joseph's College. After that he studied MBBS from Karnataka Medical College where he met his future wife Jyotsna. Amarnath went on to do his MD in Microbiology in 1983. Then he joined JIPMER as a resident doctor and later became an associate professor. He returned to Bangalore in 1996 to join Manipal hospitals as a Consultant Microbiologist.

== Achievements ==
Amarnath headed the digitization of medical and patient records in JIPMER. He published 12 scientific papers while he was in JIPMER. After the loss of vision, Amarnath helped Manipal Hospitals in implementing ISO 9001-2000 for quality procedures. He wrote two books and published several papers after his vision loss.

== See also ==
- List of blind people
