= BlindArt =

British charity founded in 2004

- Founded: 2004; 22 years ago
- Location: London, England
- Region served: United Kingdom
- Method: Direct Aid / Program Funding
- Website: BlindArt Homepage

BlindArt is a British charity that was established in 2004 to educate the public about the needs of people who are visually impaired and to promote the idea that lack of sight need not be a barrier to the creation and enjoyment of works of art. BlindArt exhibitions typically contain paintings, sculptures, installations and other works of art that have been designed to engage all the senses. BlindArt pieces are created by sighted artists, blind artists, and partially sighted artists.

BlindArt was founded in 2004 by the Iranian artist Sheri Khayami who has been visually impaired since childhood. The charity gained national attention in the United Kingdom following its 2005 Sense and Sensuality exhibition at the Royal College of Art in London. The exhibition was made up of pieces created by the finalists of the UK's first annual competition to create pieces of artwork that can be appreciated by visually impaired people. Annual competitions have been held since, with pieces of artwork from the exhibition for sale and proceeds used to create a National BlindArt Collection.

Unlike conventional exhibitions, visitors to BlindArt exhibitions are encouraged to touch and interact with the exhibits, with latex and cotton gloves provided for this purpose. The experience is enhanced through the use of audio description and braille signage. Plinths are also specially designed to allow wheelchair access.

In September 2009, the National BlindArt Collection was given a permanent home at the Royal National College for the Blind in Hereford, where it can be viewed by the public.
