= Bruce Hall (photographer) =

American photographer

- Known for: Photography
- Website: visualsummit.com

Bruce Hall is a legally blind photographer and parent of autistic twins. Some of his work is stored in the Library of Congress. Hall has stated that he takes pictures in order to be able to see the world more clearly.

Hall has 5% normal eyesight and severe nystagmus. Because of his visual difficulties, he uses workarounds to achieve the ability to take pictures. Hall's favored photography subjects are underwater photography, nature photography, and taking pictures of his twin boys. He advocates for awareness of the challenges surrounding autism.

== Immersed ==
Immersed: Our Experience With Autism is a 2016 book written by Bruce and Valerie Hall about their autistic children with highly intensive support needs. Jill Escher in a review wrote that they took "the Carrie Fisher approach and rather than trivializing or minimizing the tragic dimensions of their boys’ disorders or pretending to speak for all with 'autism,' the talented duo steadfastly tell their own truth." Psychologist David Royko wrote about how the book focuses on the difficulties of autism, and that it was good for politicians and policy makers. However, the book also discusses the love and joy of their family. Advocate Amy S.F. Lutz also noted that the book portrays the happy moments, and the difficulties of autism.

== See also ==
- Blind photography
