= Shelley Davis =

American attorney and activist

Shelley Davis (October 18, 1952 – December 12, 2008) was an American attorney and activist best known for her advocacy of rights and better working conditions for farm workers, particularly child, migrant and seasonal laborers.

== Activism ==
At the time of her death, Davis served as deputy director of the advocacy group Farmworker Justice, where she campaigned against a 2006 Environmental Protection Agency proposal that would have allowed humans to be exposed to pesticides as part of toxicity tests. Her work with Farmworker Justice also took her to the U.S. Supreme Court, where she litigated the case of Bates v. Dow Agrosciences, 544 U.S. 431 (2005), in which Dow Agrosciences attempted to block 29 Texas peanut farmers from suing the company after a pesticide developed by Dow allegedly caused damages to the farmers' crops.

Prior to working with Farmworker Justice, Davis worked to reform the H-2A program, which allows foreign nationals entry into the United States for temporary or seasonal agricultural work. The efforts of Davis and other labor advocates in monitoring a group of H-2A workers from the Caribbean, allegedly being exploited by the Florida sugar cane industry, served as the basis for the film H-2 Worker. This film won the award for 'Best Documentary' at the 1990 Sundance Film Festival.

== Personal life ==
Davis was born in Brooklyn, New York in 1952. She attended Bryn Mawr College in Pennsylvania, and received a Juris Doctor degree from the Columbus School of Law at Catholic University in 1978. She lived in Silver Spring, Maryland with her husband and son and died of breast cancer in Washington, D.C. on December 12, 2008.

Following her death, the Shelley Davis Memorial Fund was established at Farmwork Justice.
