= Miles Hilton-Barber =

British adventurer (born c.1949)

Miles Anthony Hilton-Barber (born c. 1949) is a Zimbabwean-British blind adventurer. He undertakes a variety of expeditions all around the world to raise awareness and money for a charity organization, and blind people in general. His recent trips include flying from London to Sydney in a micro-light, climbing Mont Blanc and running across the Gobi Desert.

Hilton-Barber grew up in Rhodesia (now Zimbabwe), where his father, Lt.-Col. Maurice Hilton-Barber DFC, OBE, was Director of Civil Aviation in Rhodesia. Prior to losing his sight, he aspired to be a fighter pilot like his father and two uncles, but failed the eye exam at age 18. At age 21 he was diagnosed with the genetic deteriorative condition, retinitis pigmentosa, and believed until age 50 that his life would be dull and extremely limited. His brother, Geoff, was also diagnosed with the same condition and was also fully blind by age 40 but became an adventurer in multiple extreme sports, including skydiving, sailing, and mountain and desert hiking. After Geoff set the record as the first blind sailor to cross an ocean solo, sailing from Durban, South Africa to Perth, Australia in 1997, Miles was inspired to also become an adventurer.
