= Juan Carlos González Leiva =

Cuban human rights activist

- Occupation: lawyer

Juan Carlos González Leiva is a blind lawyer and human rights activist in Cuba. He created the Fraternity of the Independent Blind of Cuba and the Cuban Foundation of Human Rights.

He has accused the government of harassing and torturing him.

== See also ==
- Chen Guangcheng, another blind activist, in the communist People's Republic of China.
- Human rights in Cuba
- Cuban dissident movement
