= Saima Saleem =

Pakistani civil servant

- Education: MPhil in English literature
- Alma mater: Kinnaird College for Women, Georgetown University
- Occupation: Diplomatic service
- Relatives: Yousaf Saleem (brother)

Saima Saleem is a Pakistani civil servant. She is the first visually impaired Pakistani woman to be employed by the Federal Government and is part of the country's diplomatic service. She is the Second Secretary on Human Rights for Pakistan's Permanent Mission to the United Nations in Geneva.

== Education ==
Saima completed her bachelor's and MPhil in English literature from Kinnaird College for Women University, where she completed both her degrees in first division and won gold medals for her performance.

She was also among the top 10 students among the 300 sighted students.

In 2007, she passed her Central Superior Services (CSS) exam, securing the 6th position overall and the first position among women.

== Personal life ==
In her childhood, Saima Saleem was diagnosed with RP (retinitis pigmentosa), an eye disease. The disease was incurable and gradually, Saima started losing her sight. When she was thirteen years old, Saima lost her vision completely. Saima has four siblings, two of whom are also blind. Earlier, her brother Yousaf Saleem became the first blind judge of Pakistan. Saima's sister, who is also blind, is a lecturer at the University of Lahore.

== Career ==
Saima started her career as a lecturer at her home university, Kinnaird College for Women, where she stayed from 2007 to 2008.

== Foreign service ==
When Saima applied for giving CSS exams, she requested Federal Public Service Commission (FPSC) to conduct a computer based exam for her. However, the FPSC refused to conduct a computer exam because they were always conducted on paper. Saima pursued her case by quoting the ordinance passed in 2005. The press release issued in this regard, said government will facilitate candidates with visual impairment and they will be allowed to take exams on computer. Saima's director of school helped her in her case and her application was sent to the staff of the president. Her application got approved by the president and Saima was finally allowed to take the computer based exams.

After passing the exam, Saima had to face another hurdle. The FPSC did not allow blind candidates to apply for foreign service. However, Saima always wanted to be a diplomat and she persuaded the panel to allow her to take up the groups of her choice. According to Saima, during her interview the panel asked "Are you not satisfied with the groups that have been allocated to you?" to which Saima said: "I am not satisfied at all because competitive exam means whatever position you get you should get the group accordingly." The panel forwarded Saima's recommendation to the Prime Minister and her case was approved by him as an exception. After passing her CSS exams, Saima joined the Foreign Service of Pakistan in 2009 where she served at the Ministry of Foreign Affairs as assistant director to China from May 2012 to July 2012 and as the assistant director Security Council and Human Rights from July 2010 to August 2011. In 2013, Saima was appointed as the second secretary on human rights for Pakistan's Permanent Mission to the United Nations in Geneva, Switzerland. She works as deputy secretary in the Prime Minister's secretariat.

== Awards ==
Saima has received many awards during her studies. She got Quaid-e-Azam gold medal on her best academic performance and got first position in Punjab Public Service Commission exam.

She has won women achievement award and Madar-e-Millat Fatima Jinnah medal.

Saima was also commended by the former Prime Minister of Pakistan, Nawaz Sharif on his visit to Switzerland in the world economic forum.
