= Meridel Rubenstein =

American artist

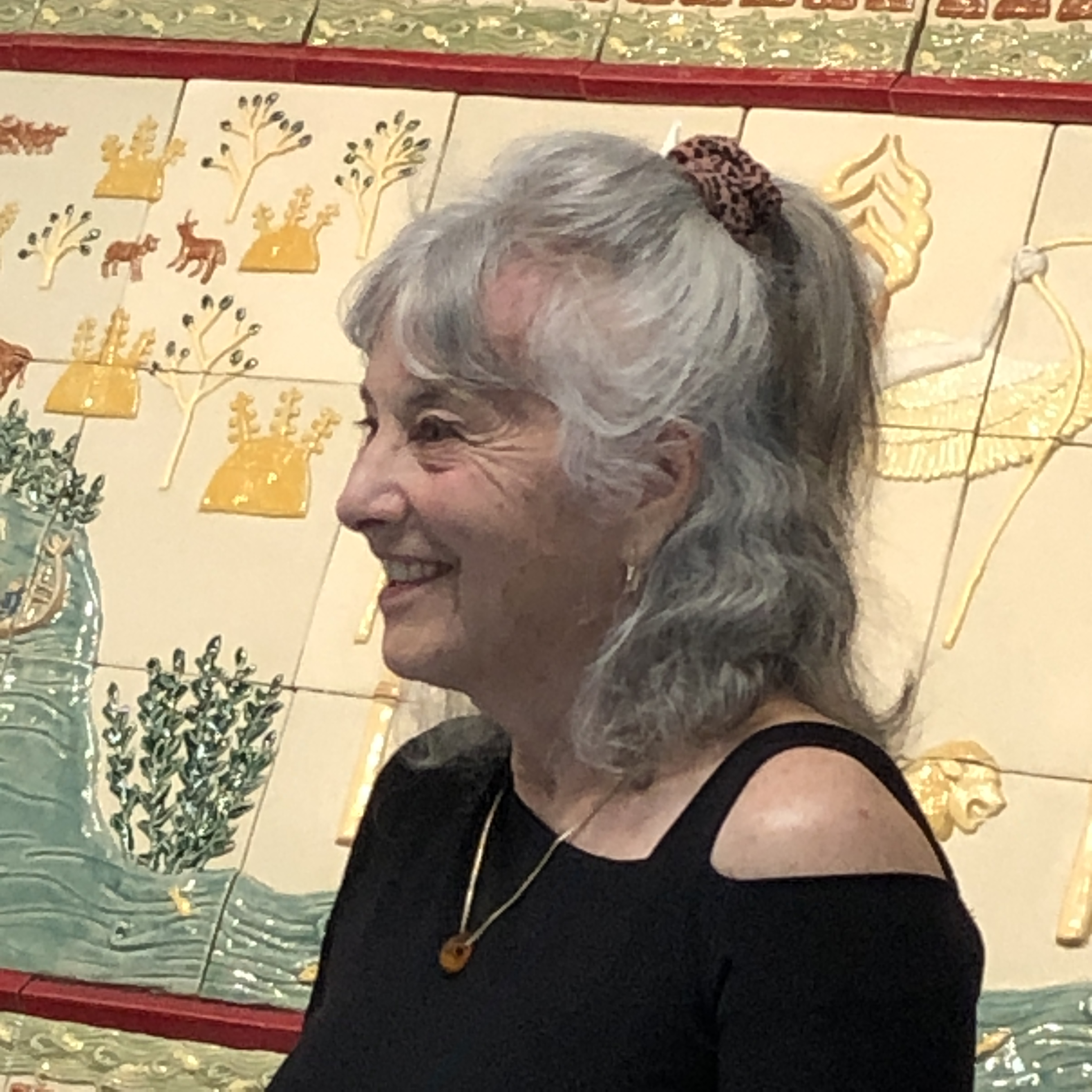
- Meridel Rubenstein in 2024
- Born: March 26, 1948 (age 78); Detroit, MI
- Education: Minor White
- Alma mater: Sarah Lawrence College; Massachusetts Institute of Technology; University of New Mexico
- Known for: Photography
- Style: narrative, mixed-media installation
- Website: www.meridelrubenstein.com

Meridel Rubenstein (born 1948) is an American photographer and installation artist based out of New Mexico. She is known for her large-format photographs incorporating sculptures and unusual media.

== Biography ==
Monks in a Canoe by Meridel Rubenstein, 2000–2001, Honolulu Museum of Art

Rubenstein was born in Detroit, Michigan in 1948. In 1970, Rubenstein earned a bachelor's degree in social science, with a film-making emphasis from Sarah Lawrence College. She received an M.A. from the University of New Mexico in 1974 and an M.F.A. from the same institution in 1977, studying with Beaumont Newhall and Franck Van Deren Coke. She received a Guggenheim Fellowship in 1981 and a National Endowment for the Arts Fellowship in 1983. From 1985 to 1990 she was head of the photography department at San Francisco State University. In 1990 she returned to New Mexico to teach at the Institute of American Indian Arts. In 2006, she received a fellowship from the Pollock-Krasner Foundation. She currently lives and works in Santa Fe, New Mexico and Singapore.

Rubenstein is best known for her large-format photographs incorporating sculptures and unusual media, such as Monks in a Canoe from 2000 to 2001 in the collection of the Honolulu Museum of Art. This work consists of a dye transfer on glass and a found wooden dug-out canoe. Her photographic series, The Volcano Cycle, is a component of the larger project, Eden Turned on its Side.

== Collections ==
The Honolulu Museum of Art, the Museum für Kunst und Gewerbe Hamburg (Hamburg, Germany), the New Mexico Museum of Art, the San Francisco Museum of Modern Art, and Smithsonian American Art Museum (Washington, DC) are among the public collections holding work by Meridel Rubenstein.
