= Yousaf Saleem =

Pakistani jurist

civil judge
- Incumbent
- Assumed office 26 June 2018

Yousaf Saleem is a Pakistani jurist. He is first ever blind judge in Pakistan. He took oath on 26 June 2018. He was gold medalist of University of the Punjab LLB (Honors) program in 2014. He also topped written judicial exam out of 6,500 candidates in 2017. He was one of 21 candidates interviewed, but was failed in interview because of his disability. After intervention of Supreme Court of Pakistan, he was selected to be a judge on merit. Supreme Court cited that according to Constitution of Pakistan, disable person can be made judge and not doing so is against fundamental rights.

Saleem is from Lahore and son of a charted accountant. He is youngest child in his family and has four elder sisters and two of them are visually impaired. His sister Saima Saleem was first blind civil services officer. She was gold medalist from Kinnaird College and ranked sixth in civil services exam held in 2007. She joined foreign services and served in UN missions in Geneva and New York.
