= Blind photography =

Photography by blind photographers

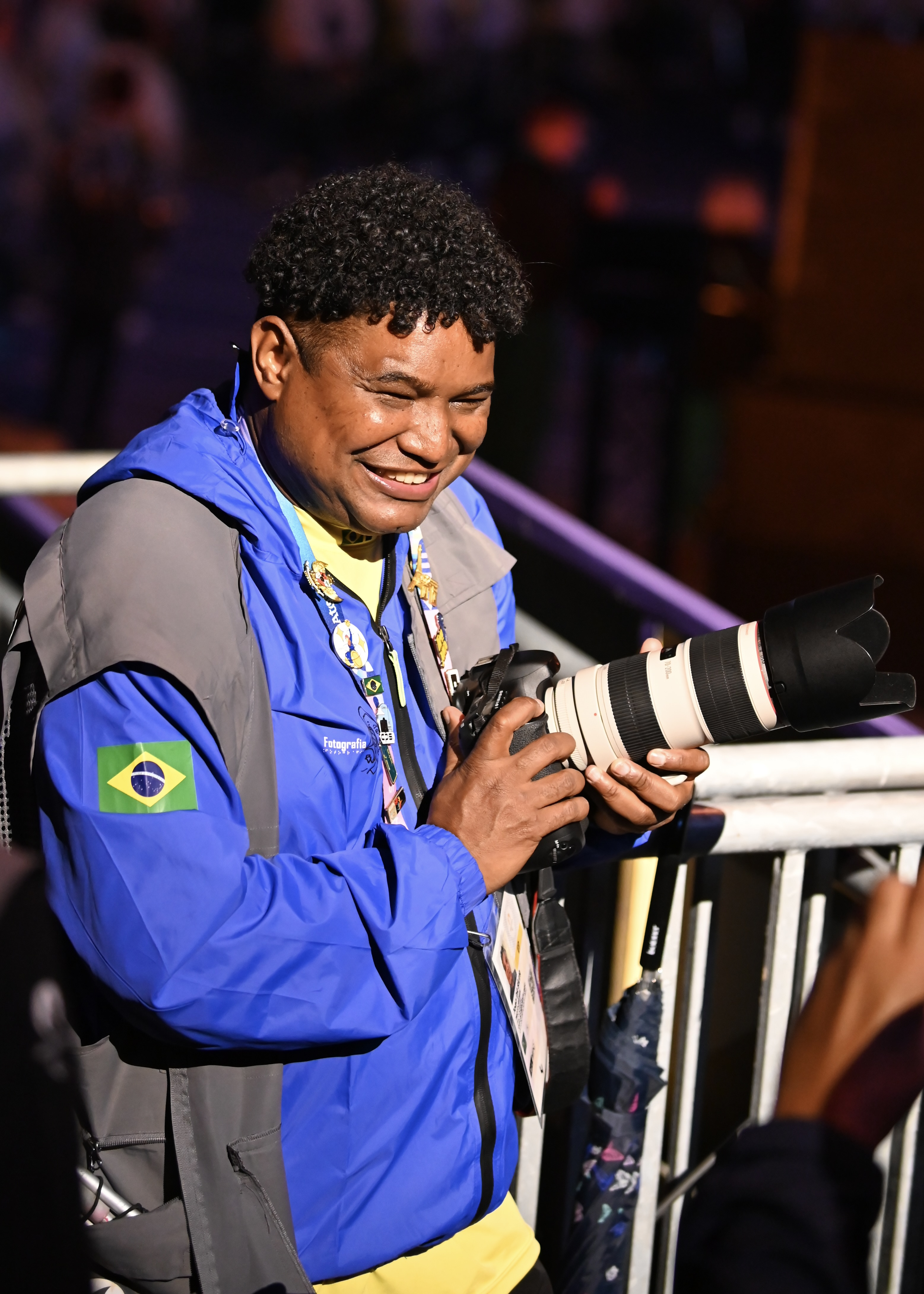
Blind Brazilian photographer João Batista Maia da Silva at the 2024 Summer Paralympics closing ceremony

Blind photography is a term that refers to photographic work done by a person who is visually impaired and/or blind.

== History ==
Since at least the 1970s, people with visual disabilities have been engaging in photography as an art form. In 1976, Evgen Bavcar began doing photography at the Institute of Contemporary Art Aesthetics, and, in 1988, he was titled the Official Photographer of the Month in Paris. In the 1980s, Jazz musician and composer Henry Butler, who was blind from infancy, experimented with photography; his work was published in various art galleries and events in 1985.

Seeing With Photography Collective, a group of blind and visually impaired photographers based in New York, was established in the early 1990s. Since then, the collective has had great success and their work has been exhibited in galleries across the globe. In April 2010, Pete Eckert and Bruce Hall became the first blind photographers to shoot for Playboy. Their model was Hiromi Oshima, the first ever Japanese Playmate. In 2010, the Library of Congress, Prints and Photographs Division, purchased a portfolio of photographs from Hall’s Autism in Reflection series for their permanent collection. In 2015, PhotoVice, in partnership with Sense, launched a project in the UK, Mexico, and China with the objective to help deafblind participants explore artistic expression through photography.

== Types of work ==
The two most common forms of work done by blind photographers are realistic photography and artistic expression.

=== Realism ===
Some blind photographers focus their work on capturing the world around them as is. This includes taking pictures of their homes and neighborhoods, the people they care about, or their work may aim to capture the daily life of foreign cultures.

In their professional work, some photographers take tight headshots or portraits of ordinary people, actors, and celebrities. In other cases, visually impaired photographers attempt to share their visual perspective with a sighted audience, to recreate what they see.

=== Artistic expression and conceptual photography ===
Several blind photographers attempt to capture images that reflect their mental image of their subject, often called the "mind's eye" or "soul's eye". Their work is often inspired by their senses and past memories. The intention is not to capture the object as it is but rather to focus on art, creativity, and a sense of freedom. The goal, then, is to show their audience the essence of subjects according to their mind’s eye and to commentate on it.

== Techniques ==
Each photographer has their own process of how they capture their images. However, there are some common techniques among artists.

=== Sighted help ===
One common technique is getting help from sighted assistants, whose involvement ranges from artist to artist. In some cases, the sighted assistants help place the camera, fix the composure, and set up the subjects under the direction of the photographer.

Depending on the artist, their direction can be very specific with camera, light and object placement along with specific settings for each. In other cases, sighted assistants are not needed. Some photographers set up their camera and expose their own photographs unassisted.

=== Light painting ===
Light painting is a term used to describe long-exposure photography in which the camera’s shutter is held open for a prolonged period of time. In this time, the artist or their assistants wave a light around the object and within the frame which is captured on the final still as long light streaks and luminous distortions. Any movement by the subject within that time is also recorded in the photograph and is shown as a vibration in motion.

=== Alternate frequencies ===
Sometimes combined with the light painting technique, some photographers decide to shoot in wavelengths that cannot be seen by the naked eye. This is achieved with cameras with custom and sensitive sensors and even vintage cameras.

=== Smart phones ===
Modern smartphones come with many accessibility features that aid people with visual disabilities in taking pictures. Apple’s VoiceOver dictates camera orientation, settings and buttons of the camera app as the user drags their finger across the screen. In combination with facial recognition technology, VoiceOver also informs the user how many people are in frame, their position and whether they are in focus. This can allow blind photographers to take panoramic pictures.

Google's Pixel phones include an accessibility feature called "Guided Frame," using the Talkback screen reader, it walks visually impaired people through the steps of taking a selfie by telling the user where to move the phone and how to place themselves. When the image is ready, it automatically takes the picture.

== Notable artists ==
- Pete Eckert - A photographer with retinitis pigmentosa who has photographed for Volkswagen and Playboy.
- Bruce Hall - A legally blind (congenital nystagmus) underwater photographer whose work has been featured in Discover Diving, Nature's Best Photography, Spirit Magazine, Men's Journal, National Geographic, and the National Museum of History. His work is also archived in The Library of Congress.
- Evgen Bavcar - A Slovenia-born photographer and author. His work was showcased in France, Germany, Italy, Mexico, Brazil, and Canada from the 1990's to the early 2000's.
- Gerando Nigenda - A Mexican photographer whose work blends photography and poetry by including braille to his images.
- Ian Treherne - A deaf and blind photographer who focuses on portraits and realistic depictions of life.
