= Butchie =

Character from The Wire

- The Wire character
- S. Robert Morgan as Butchie
- First appearance: "Hot Shots" (2003)
- Last appearance: "Not for Attribution" (2008)
- Created by: David Simon
- Portrayed by: S. Robert Morgan

In-universe information
- Gender: Male
- Occupation: Bar owner
- Family: Hayward (Nephew)

Butchie is a fictional character on the HBO drama series The Wire, portrayed by S. Robert Morgan. A blind man, he runs an East-Side Baltimore bar, and is Omar Little's bank and advisor. Like his character, actor S. Robert Morgan is blind; he lost his sight to macular degeneration in his twenties.

== The Wire ==
=== Season 2 ===
Butchie is first seen supplying Corrections Officer Tilghman with the narcotics he sells inside the prison and later negotiating with Stringer Bell over supplying Tilghman with the poisoned drugs that will kill several prisoners and hospitalize others. Later in the season, it becomes apparent that Butchie is a connection to Omar, as Proposition Joe arranges a face-to-face meeting between Omar and Stringer by talking to him.

=== Season 3 ===
Butchie's connection to Omar is more apparent, as several scenes show Omar getting advice from Butchie. Omar enlists Butchie to find Officer Dozerman's missing gun, and Omar returns it to Detective Bunk Moreland through Butchie. Butchie later provides Omar with Avon Barksdale's hideout location. Butchie had known the information all along but hoped to protect Omar by withholding it. In the end, Avon is arrested before Omar can use Butchie's tip.

=== Season 4 ===
Proposition Joe again contacts Butchie to set up a meeting with Omar, this time pitting Omar against Marlo Stanfield by convincing Omar to rob a card game that Stanfield will attend. When Stanfield contrives to have Omar framed for murder, Butchie is Omar's first phone call after Omar is arrested. Omar escapes the charge and steals an entire shipment of drugs from the New Day Co-Op, getting revenge on both Stanfield and Joe ("That's Got His Own"). Butchie suggests that Omar sell the shipment back to Joe, and Omar leaves Baltimore to retire on the profits. ("Final Grades")

=== Season 5 ===
Despite Omar leaving, Marlo is still vengeful over Omar's insult to him at the robbery. Partlow secretly meets with cheese who reveals Butchie's connection to Omar. Snoop and Chris go to Butchie, killing one of his men and wounding Big Guy in the leg. Butchie is tortured in his bar by Stanfield enforcers Chris Partlow and Snoop in an effort to lure Omar from retirement. Butchie refuses to give information about Omar's whereabouts and is killed by Chris; his death prompts Omar to return to Baltimore for revenge. Butchie's surviving bodyguard Big Guy is left alive by Chris and Snoop revealing to Omar when questioned, they tortured Butchie "to send a message". Omar vows to "work them" and proceeds on an assault campaign against Stansfield. ("Not for Attribution")

== See also ==
- Omar Little and associates
