= S. Robert Morgan =

American television actor and theatre director

S. Robert Morgan is an American television actor and theatre director. He starred in the HBO drama series The Wire as Butchie from the second season until the show's fifth and final season.

== Personal life ==
Morgan is from Fort Washington, Maryland and is a regular patron of the Martin Luther King Jr. Memorial Library, which The Washington Post has described as "A Haven for Sightless Readers". He lost his sight in his twenties due to macular degeneration.

== Filmography ==
- Literary Visions (1992) (Actor) (2 episodes)
- The Wire (2003–08) (Butchie) (10 episodes)
- Blind Date (2009) (Fred)
- Luke Cage (2016) (Oliver) (Moment of Truth)
