= Diane Burko =

American painter (born 1945)

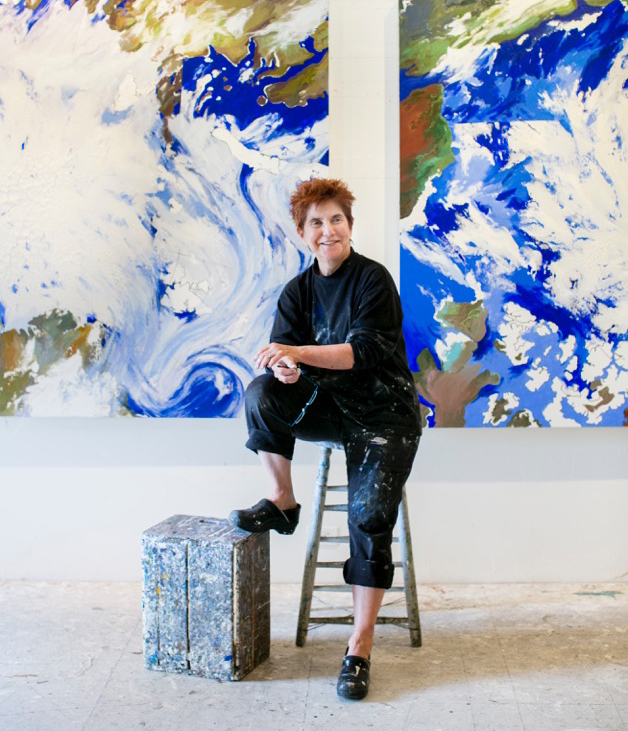
- Burko in 2016. Paintings "Arctic Melting, July 2016 (After NOAA)" and "Arctic Melting, July 2016 (After NASA)" in the background.
- Born: 1945; New York City, US
- Education: Skidmore College; University of Pennsylvania
- Known for: Painting, photography

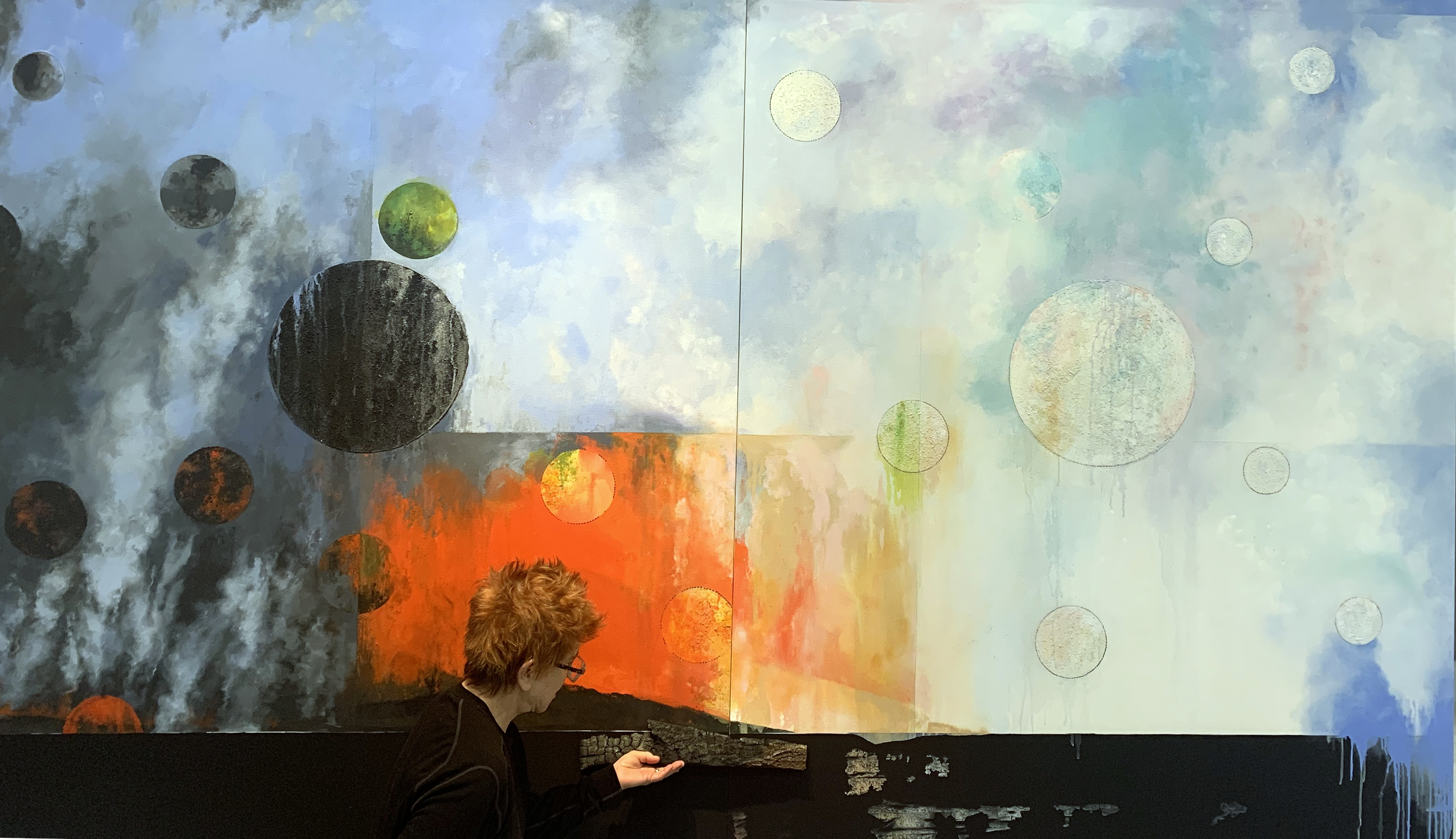
Diane Burko adds finishing touches to her 2021 painting "Unprecedented."

Diane Burko (b. 1945, New York City, NY) is an American painter and photographer. She is based in Philadelphia and Bucks County, Pennsylvania. Her work addresses landscape, climate change and environmental activism.

== Biography ==
External videos
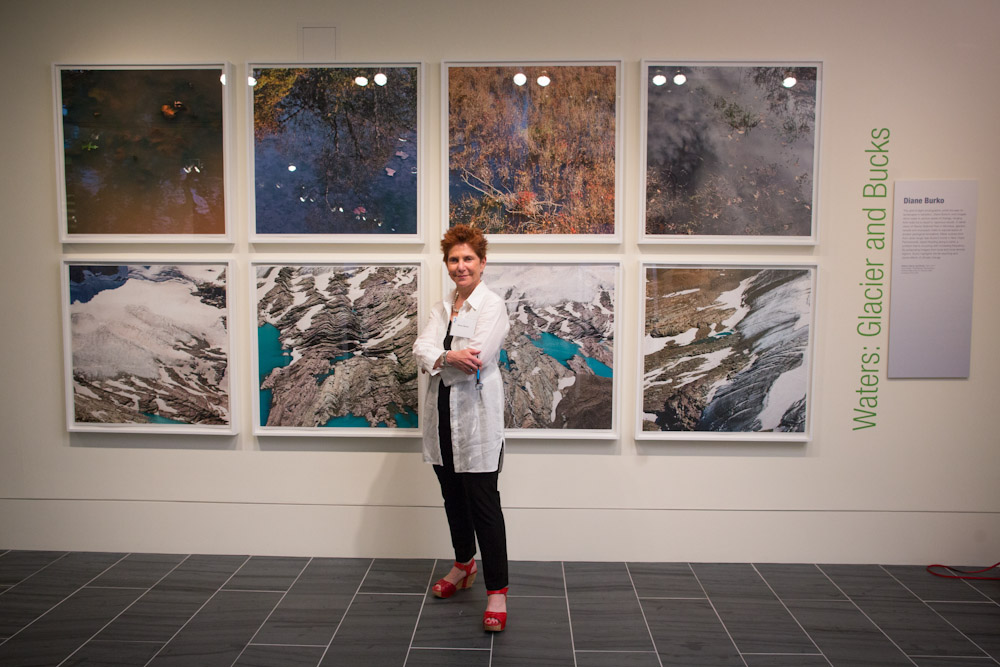
- "Serendipity plays a big role in my life. Things just get connected, and I'm always standing back and saying, 'Wow. How did that happen?'", Science History Institute, 2013
- "Diane Burko, Painter" by John Thornton

Diane Burko was born in Brooklyn, New York in 1945. Burko received a B.S. in art history and painting from Skidmore College in 1966, and an M.F.A. from the University of Pennsylvania in 1969. She is professor emeritus at the Community College of Philadelphia, and has taught at various schools across the country such as Princeton University, Arizona State University and the Pennsylvania Academy of the Fine Arts. She has served on the College Art Association board of directors.

Burko was the founder of FOCUS, Philadelphia Focuses on Women in the Visual Arts, a two-month-long all city festival in 1974

== Work ==
Burko's work has been shown at Locks Gallery, Cristin Tierney Gallery, Cindy Lisica Gallery, LewAllen Gallery, Tufts University, the Michener Museum, the Bernstein Gallery at Princeton University, Rowan University Art Gallery, Walton Arts Center, Zimmerli Art Museum, the Tang Museum, the National Academy of Sciences, the American University Museum in Washington, D.C., Círculo de Bellas Artes in Madrid, and the Royal Academy of Arts in London, UK.

Burko's early work consisted of drawings and paintings of iconic American landscapes such as the Grand Canyon and Lake Powell, as well as international sources such as the French Alps. In 1977, while flying with Light and Space artist James Turrell in his Helio Courier over the Grand Canyon, Burko captured her first aerial photographs of the landscape. Burko's paintings draw from art historical sources such as the Hudson River School and the appropriation of landscape imagery in popular culture. Past subjects include the landscape of Bucks County, Pennsylvania, the coast of California, the fjords of Scandinavia, and the volcanoes of Hawaii, Italy and Iceland. In 2000, this led to Burko's interest in volcanic tectonics and glacial geology, as well as climate change.

Burko depicts scientific data through visual motifs, incorporating Landsat imagery, mapping data and U.S.G.S. repeat photography archives. From 2007 through 2011, Burko developed the project Politics of Snow, investigating the historical comparisons of global climate change through images culled from glacial geological data recorded throughout the world. Other works depict the same location seen from different points in time, showing the effects of climate change on a specific site – a method glaciologists call "repeats." Such photo-documents have been shot by scientists and field researchers at U.S. Geological Survey and Byrd Polar Research Center at Ohio State University, such as David Arnold, Henry Brecher, Dan Fagre, Ulysses S. Grant IV, Karen Holzer, Carl Key, Bruce Molnia, Sidney Paige, Tad Pfeffer, Lonnie Thompson and Bradford Washburn. Judith E. Stein observes, "To my horror, I found myself adding my own mental image to each sequence, extrapolating from what [Burko] shows, thereby envisioning the next, un-depicted step in the warming process—our dystopic future."

Since 2013, Burko has embarked on research expeditions to various glaciers and reefs around the world. Through these locations, Burko explores the impacts of climate change, with particular emphasis on glacial melt and coral bleaching. In 2013, Burko traveled to Antarctica in January and the high Arctic in October. The latter was sponsored by the nonprofit organization The Arctic Circle, and was supported by a Fellowship in the Arts, awarded by The Independence Foundation in Philadelphia. These expeditions led to a body of work entitled "Polar Investigations." In 2015, Burko flew from Ushuaia to El Calafate to discover the Patagonian ice field of Argentina. In 2017, her exploration of landscapes affected by climate change continued with New Zealand's Fox and Franz Josef Glacier, along with The Great Barrier Reef. This experience marked a shift in her practice from glaciers to reefs.

In January 2018, Diane Burko travelled to American Samoa, Oahu, and Honolulu with the non-profit project "Kai 'Apapa," a multimedia exploration of American coral reef systems, in collaboration with climatologist Samiah Moustafa, composer/video artist Christine Southworth, and composer/clarinetist Evan Ziporyn. The project aims to raise awareness of the rapid changes to coral reef systems, and present the scientific ramifications through art and performance. The project has received a nearly $31,450 grant from the MAP Fund.

Independently, Burko's recent work includes video and lenticular pieces based on footage from this expedition, alongside paintings of reefs. Following the record-breaking wildfires intensified by deforestation of the Amazon Rainforest in 2019, Burko has pivoted the focus of her paintings towards the Amazon Basin and the relationship between extractive industry and ecological degradation.

== Activism ==
Burko has spoken about the role of art in climate discourse at universities and conferences including the American Geophysical Union, the Geological Society of America, the Atlantic Council (Washington, D.C.), the Michener Museum, the Zimmerli Museum, The Painting Center (New York City), the University of Colorado, Boulder. Burko's 2018 exhibition at Rowan University was accompanied by the panel "Art and Science Perspectives on Climate Change," hosted in partnership with the School of Earth and Environment and Rowan University Art Gallery.

== Collections ==
Burko's work is in the collections of the Philadelphia Museum of Art, the Pennsylvania Academy of the Fine Arts, the Woodmere Art Museum, the Delaware Art Museum, the Art Institute of Chicago, the James A. Michener Art Museum, the Frederick R. Weisman Art Museum, the Zimmerli Art Museum at Rutgers University, the Hood Museum, the Tucson Museum of Art, the Phillips Collection, the National Academy of Sciences, Everson Museum of Art, Montclair Art Museum, the David Owsley Museum of Art, and the Minneapolis Institute of Art.

Burko was represented by Locks Gallery from 1976 through 2012. From 2012 to 2015, she was shown by LewAllen Gallery in Santa Fe, NM, and from 2016 to 2019 she was shown by Cindy Lisica Gallery, in Houston, TX, where she mounted her 2016 solo exhibition, "Traces of Change."

Burko worked as an independent artist from 2012 to 2025, and as of Spring 2025, she is now represented by Cristin Tierney Gallery in New York City. This came shortly after her first solo exhibition there, titled "Diane Burko: Bearing Witness," which ran from January 31 to March 8, 2025. That exhibition was her first solo show in New York in over 40 years.

== Awards ==
In 1976, Ivan Karp offered Burko a "Dealer's Showcase" at OK Harris Gallery in New York, NY, which attracted the attention of critic David Bourdon, who reviewed her solo exhibition in The Village Voice. Critics and curators who have written about Burko's work include: Lawrence Alloway, Roberta Fallon, Pat Hogan, Leslie Kaufman, Cate McQuaid, Preston McLane, Edith Newhall, John Perreault, Carter Ratcliff, Libby Rosof, Julie Sasse, Amy Schlegel, Ed Sozanski, and Michael Tomor.

In 1989, the Lila Wallace Reader's Digest Fund awarded Burko a grant to fund a six-month residency in Giverny, France. The paintings which resulted from this residency met with positive reviews in the United States. The Washington Postpraised Burko's "distinctive approach to composition."

In 1993 Burko was awarded a residency at the Rockefeller Study and Conference Center in Bellagio where she painted en plein air for five weeks. This culminated in her 1994 Locks Gallery exhibition, "Luci ed Ombra di Bellagio" – "The Light and Shadow of Bellagio." Robert Rosenblum, who first took an interest in Burko's work in 1976, wrote the accompanying catalog essay.

Burko has received two NEA Visual Arts Fellowships (1985, 1991); two Individual Artists Grants from the Pennsylvania Council on the Arts (1981, 1989); a Lila Acheson Wallace Foundation Residence Fellowship (1989); a Rockefeller Foundation Residence Fellowship (1993); and the Bessie Berman $50,000 Grant, awarded by the Leeway Foundation in Philadelphia (2000).

In 1996, Burko won a $200,000 Public Art commission sponsored by the Redevelopment Authority of the City of Philadelphia and the Marriott Hotel. The result was a three-year project: Wissahickon Reflections, which comprises over 1,400 square feet (130 m^{2}) of paintings, with one single panel measuring 11.5 feet (3.5 m) by 32 feet (9.8 m).

Burko has been an active member in the Feminist art movement. In 1974 she founded the all city festival "Focus: Philadelphia Focus on Women in the Visual Arts – Past and Present." She was awarded the WCA/CAA Lifetime Achievement Award in February 2011. In 2019, Burko was awarded the Fleisher Founder's Award, honoring her "contributions as an artist, educator, and environmentalist" and her "commitment to providing access to the arts."
