= John Bramblitt =

American painter (born 1971)

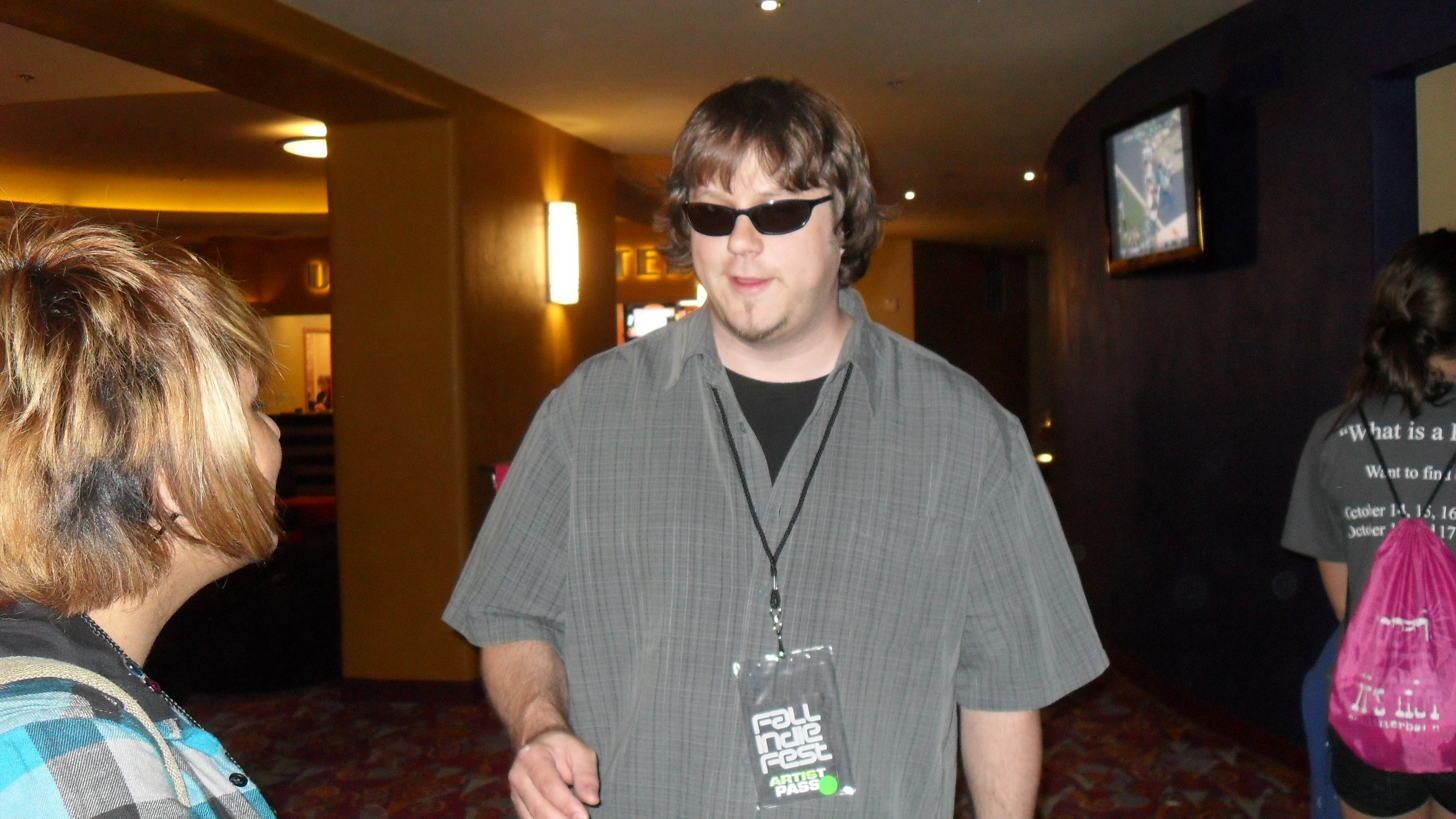
Bramblitt in 2010

John Bramblitt (born 1971) is an American painter, muralist, author, educator, and speaker who began painting after losing his sight in 2001. He taught himself to paint by developing tactile techniques that use raised lines to navigate the canvas and differences in paint texture and viscosity to identify colors. The Taubman Museum of Art has described Bramblitt as the first blind person in the world to work on large-scale outdoor murals. His work also includes inclusive art workshops designed for participants with and without disabilities.

Bramblitt was born in El Paso, Texas and began painting after losing his sight in 2001 following a series of severe seizures. He fell into a deep depression until he found his love for painting. Bramblitt has been tby adding different mediums to his paints to give each color a different texture that can be identified by touch. He is the subject of multiple media stories, including an award-winning documentary and a video that was voted Most Inspirational Video of 2008 for YouTube. He was awarded three U.S. presidential service awards in 2005, 2006, and 2007 for his creation of a series of free art workshops designed to bring art to people and neighborhoods lacking access to art instruction.

Bramblitt also authored the book Shouting in the Dark. He still paints and lives in Denton, Texas with his wife and son.

While he was a student at the University of North Texas, Bramblitt was featured on the Texas Country Reporter.

== Murals and public art ==
Bramblitt began creating large-scale public murals in 2017, becoming the first blind artist known to work on large-scale outdoor murals. He adapted the tactile methods he had developed for studio painting to architectural-scale surfaces, using touch and physical landmarks to navigate much larger compositions. His first mural was created in the Bushwick neighborhood of Brooklyn, New York, for World Sight Day. Since then, Bramblitt has created murals and large-scale public artworks in the United States and internationally. Among his documented projects are two four-story murals in Dallas's Bishop Arts District, a civic mural in downtown Garland, Texas, and an outdoor mural at the Taubman Museum of Art in Roanoke, Virginia. These projects represent only a portion of his larger body of mural and public-art work. His large-scale work has also extended beyond traditional walls. In 2017, Bramblitt created the original artwork for Musicolors, which was adapted across a GOL Linhas Aéreas Boeing 737-800 for the Rock in Rio music festival. The finished aircraft installation used more than 700 square metres of material and flew routes throughout Brazil, South America, and the Caribbean.
