= Eşref Armağan =

Turkish blind painter (born 1953)

- Born: 1953 (age 72–73); Istanbul, Turkey
- Known for: Painting

Eşref Armağan (born 1953) is a Turkish painter born in Istanbul, Turkey. He is a very prominent painter in Turkey, mostly known for his ability to portray forms, perspective and colour in his artworks despite suffering from complete visual impairment, a condition he was born with.

== Early life ==
Armağan grew up legally blind in a poor household and with no formal education. One of his eyes failed to develop beyond a "rudimentary bud", meanwhile the other was "stunted and scarred". Having no visual perspective of the outside world, he resorted to experiencing the world through heightening his other senses, particularly through touch. He often looked to his father, Nazim Armağan, for guidance. He started to take interest in learning about the world at the age of 6.

== Painting process ==
He has painted using oil paint for roughly 35 years. Armağan first visualises his painting before even touching the canvas, after which he often uses a braille stylus or a rope covered in a sticky substance to create the outline of his drawing. He requires complete silence before he begins painting. He then uses his fingers to apply the oil paint. After he applies one layer, he leaves it to dry before applying a new colour so that there is no smudging. The art pieces themselves are created without help from any individual. He is also able to create art that has visual perspective.

His art style is one based on challenging the limitations that affect him via his condition. In an interview with Al-Jazeera, he stated that his art is "...to prove that I can draw by touch" as well as claimed that if he were to "...specialise in abstract art, the critics would dismiss my efforts as 'he paints things as he feels them'" rather than a skill to see past his blindness.

== Psychological subject ==
In 2004, he was the subject of a study of human perception, conducted by the psychologist John M. Kennedy of the University of Toronto. This was to prove that, contrary to popular belief, a blind person can develop their visual prowess normally without external visual input from the outside world. In 2008 two researchers from Harvard, Amir Amedi and Alvaro Pascual-Leone, tried to find more about neuroplasticity using Armağan as a study case.

Both scientists had evidence that in cases of blindness, the visual cortex acts differently from how it acts with the non-blind. Pascual-Leone has found that Braille readers use this very same area for touch. Amedi, together (with Ehud Zohary) at the Hebrew University in Jerusalem, found that the area is also activated in verbal memory tasks. The results they found showed that Armağan's visual cortex lit up during the drawing task, but hardly at all for verbal recall, meaning that some unused visual areas might be used in collaboration with one's needs from the brain. Moreover, in scans that were held while Armağan drew, his visual cortex signals seemed as he was seeing to the extent that a naive viewer of his scan might assume Armağan really could see. Through this study, they concluded that ″...the blind and the sighted use perspective projection in making and using tactile pictures, and pictures by the blind include the use of freehand parallel, one-point and two-point perspective″.

== Exhibitions and media ==
He has displayed his work at more than 20 exhibitions in Turkey, Italy, China, the Netherlands and the Czech Republic. He has appeared several times on television and in the press in Turkey and has been on programs on Al Jazeera, BBC and ZD.

=== Volvo ad campaign ===
In 2009, Armağan was invited by Volvo to paint the new model S60 as part of a social media campaign.

Prior to the release of the S60, Volvo asked him to paint his interpretation of the then unreleased model as a promotional piece. This was a key demonstration of his ability to sense form and perspective, as well as contrast between the landscape and the car.

Armağan absorbed the information by walking around the car, highlighting the key aspects of the car model such as the hood and the side. He then depicted the car on a road using a ¾ perspective. His work was documented in a series of videos posted on Volvo's Facebook page. The resulting painting of the S60 sold on eBay for US$3,050. The Canadian non-profit charity organization World Blind Union was the benefactor of the auction.

=== Other works ===
Other more notable works include his exhibitions for organizations such as the Art Education for the Blind, a non-profit organization aimed at making art accessible to those with visual impairment.

== Personal life ==
Armağan is married and has two children.

== Sources ==
- Official Sites— Eşref Armağan, Extraordinary people: Esref Armagan
- "Senses special: The art of seeing without sight" The New Scientist 29 January 2005
- John Kennedy's study at the University of Toronto.Esref Armagan and perspective in tactile pictures
- Слепой художник Эшреф Армаган
- Blogspot Painting in the Dark: Esref Armagan, Blind Artist Esref Armagan: History, photographs, how to buy his art. Also links to science journals, articles, and videos.
- Tobias Teutenberg: Bilder aus der Dunkelheit. Zum sichtbar Taktilen in der Kunst Eşref Armağans, 2013
- Locke and Hume’s Philosophical Theory of Color is Investigated through a Case Study of Esref Armagan, An Artist Born Blind
- Art Beyond Sight
