= Nice Guy Johnny =

- Film poster
- Directed by: Edward Burns
- Written by: Edward Burns
- Produced by: Aaron Lubin; Edward Burns; William Rexer II
- Starring: Kerry Bishé; Matt Bush; Edward Burns; Max Baker
- Cinematography: William Rexer II
- Edited by: Janet Gaynor
- Music by: P.T. Walkley
- Distributed by: Marlboro Road Gang Productions
- Release dates: April 2010 (Tribeca Film Festival); October 26, 2010 (United States)
- Running time: 89 minutes
- Country: United States
- Language: English
- Budget: $25,000

Nice Guy Johnny is a 2010 American romantic comedy film written and directed by Edward Burns, and starring Matt Bush, Kerry Bishé and Burns.

== Plot ==
Johnny Rizzo, a young man who dreams of working in radio, is engaged to Claire. When Claire demands that he pursue a more realistic goal than following his dreams, Johnny's uncle Terry attempts to tempt him away from the relationship with a decadent party. Johnny resists his uncle's hedonistic lifestyle, but meets a free-spirited woman named Brooke, whom he quickly befriends. Alarmed by the direction Johnny's life is taking, Brooke encourages him to pursue his dreams and avoid selling out. When a misunderstanding causes Claire to incorrectly believe that Johnny has been cheating on her with Brooke, Johnny and Claire break up. Now free to pursue a romance, Johnny and Brooke begin dating.

== Cast ==
- Matt Bush as Johnny Rizzo
- Kerry Bishé as Brooke
- Edward Burns as Uncle Terry
- Max Baker as Max
- Anna Wood as Claire
- Brian Delate as Frank
- Marsha Dietlein as Nicole
- Jay Patterson as Dr. Meadows
- Michele Harris as Amy

== Production ==
Burns based the film on his own experiences as an independent filmmaker when offered a choice between following his dreams and working for a major studio. After his previous film, Purple Violets, did not perform as hoped, Burns took the opportunity to re-educate himself on screenwriting. He recalled, "I recognized after my film Purple Violets that I had gotten away from respecting traditional storytelling structure. I thought I knew it, but I stopped outlining and stopped thinking about audiences’ expectations. After that film I thought that I needed to go back and re-educate myself. So I went back and read a ton of books on Hollywood screenwriting and story structure. A lot of it I found very helpful and a lot of it I didn’t, but I know going back and having respect for structure helped me enormously as a screenwriter."

Knowing that Nice Guy Johnny would be a micro-budget film (as his following films, Newlyweds and The Fitzgerald Family Christmas, would be) while writing the script, Burns concentrated on how he could keep the cost of the film down:

"With all three of those movies I would write down the list of locations that I knew I could get for free. I knew I would be writing more daytime exterior scenes than nighttime scenes just because of the cost of lighting and how time consuming and difficult shooting at night is with a micro-budget. I also knew I would be writing away from any scenes that would require a lot of extras. With those parameters I wrote the scripts. It was a different discipline."

== Soundtrack ==
The soundtrack is composed by P.T. Walkley. His song "Save The World" is featured in the film's theatrical trailer.

== Release ==
Nice Guy Johnny was released on DVD in the United States on April 23, 2010.

== Reception ==
Dan Heaton of PopMatters rated it 5/10 stars, and wrote: "This good-natured story needs more fiery drama and conflict to make its resolution inspiring." Jason Bailey of DVD Talk rated it 2/5 stars and praised Bishé's performance, but called the film "not terribly funny and not really dramatic". Patrick Bromley of DVD Verdict also wrote a mixed review while praising Bishé. Bromley concluded: "I wish I could speak more highly of Nice Guy Johnny, but the audience for Burns' films seems to be shrinking thanks to outings like this one. It inspires mostly indifference."
