= Kerry Bishé =

American actress

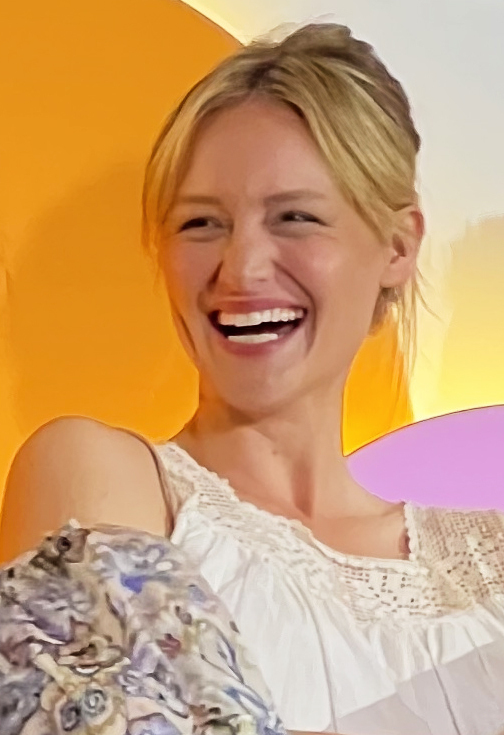
- Bishé in 2024 at the 10th anniversary panel for Halt and Catch Fire
- Education: Northwestern University (BS)
- Occupation: Actress
- Years active: 2007–present
- Spouse: Chris Lowell
- Children: 1

Kerry Bishé is an American actress. She is best known for her roles as Donna Clark in the AMC period drama series Halt and Catch Fire (2014–2017) and Lucy Bennett, the lead/narrator in the ninth season of the ABC medical sitcom Scrubs (2009–2010), and her supporting role in the drama film Argo (2012).

== Early life and education ==
Kerry Bishé grew up in Glen Ridge, New Jersey, in the United States. She graduated from Montclair Kimberley Academy, where her father, Kenneth Bishé, taught social studies, and then enrolled at Northwestern University in 2006.

== Career ==
Bishé toured professionally with Montana Shakespeare in the Parks during the summer of 2004, performing the role of Juliet in Romeo and Juliet. She also appeared in a 2006 production of Eugene O'Neill's The Hairy Ape and in the Roundabout revival of George Bernard Shaw's Pygmalion.

Bishé made her screen debut in 2007 when she portrayed Sarah Rosen in The Half Life of Mason Lake, a low-budget production. After appearances as an extra in the first film adaptation of Sex and the City and The Lucky Ones, and a small role in The Understudy (2008), Bishé was cast in Night Life, a television pilot directed by Scrubs star Zach Braff. The production did not make Bishé well-known, but did introduce her to Braff, with whom she later worked on Scrubs.

In 2009, Bishé had a number of television roles, appearing in an episode of the American version of Life on Mars, an episode of the USA comedy drama series Royal Pains, and in the lead role in the TV movie made from the failed pilot of the proposed sci-fi series Virtuality.

In December 2009, Bishé took on the lead role on the ABC medical sitcom Scrubs, that of Lucy Bennett, the show's new narrator, taking over from Zach Braff. ABC cancelled the show May 14, 2010. Bishé costarred in the independent film Nice Guy Johnny (2010) with Edward Burns and Matt Bush. She also played a supporting role in Kevin Smith's horror film Red State (2011) and in Ben Affleck's drama film Argo (2012). In 2013, she co-starred with Elijah Wood in the independent film Grand Piano.

From 2014 to 2017, Bishé starred as Donna Clark in the AMC period drama series Halt and Catch Fire. Coincidentally, her character's husband in Halt and Catch Fire is portrayed by Scoot McNairy, who also played her spouse in Argo (2012). In season three of Narcos, she played Cristina Jurado, the American wife of the Cali Cartel's Harvard-educated money launderer Franklin Jurado.

In 2023, Bishé returned to theatre, starring in the Steven Soderbergh-produced play The Fears.

== Personal life ==
Bishé is married to actor Chris Lowell, with whom she has a daughter.

== Filmography ==
=== Film ===
Year	Title	Role	Notes
2007	The Half Life of Mason Lake	Sarah Rosen	
2008	The Lucky Ones	College Girl	
2008	Sex and the City	Twenty-Something Girl Dreaming	
2008	The Understudy	April	
2009	Motherhood	Good Sharing Mom	
2010	Meskada	Emily Cordin	
2010	Nice Guy Johnny	Brooke	
2011	Red State	Cheyenne	
2011	Turkey Bowl	Kerry	
2011	Newlyweds	Linda	
2012	Argo	Kathy Stafford	
2012	The Fitzgerald Family Christmas	Sharon	
2013	Max Rose	Annie Rose	
2013	Goodbye World	Lily Palmer	
2013	Grand Piano	Emma Selznick	
2013	Blue Highway	Kerry	
2016	The Ticket	Jessica	
2016	Rupture	Dianne	
2018	How It Ends	Meg	
2020	The Evening Hour	Lacy Cooper	
2021	Happily	Janet	
2024	Madame Web	Constance Webb	
2024	Anwar	Mona	Short film

=== Television ===
Year	Title	Role	Notes
2009	Life on Mars	Eve Flannery	Episode: "The Simple Secret of the Note in Us All"
2009	Royal Pains	Emma Newberg	Episode: "Strategic Planning"
2009	Virtuality	Billie Kashmiri	Television pilot
2009–2010	Scrubs	Lucy Bennett	Narrator; 13 episodes
2014–2017	Halt and Catch Fire	Donna Clark	40 episodes
2015	Public Morals	Sarah	2 episodes
2016	Billions	Elise	Episode: "Short Squeeze"
2017	Narcos	Cristina Jurado	5 episodes
2018	The Romanoffs	Shelly Romanoff	Episode: "The Royal We"
2020	Amazing Stories	Mary Ann Whitaker	Episode: "The Rift"
2020	Penny Dreadful: City of Angels	Sister Molly Finnister	10 episodes
2022	Super Pumped: The Battle for Uber	Austin Geidt	7 episodes
2025	Law & Order	Grace Hall	Episode: "Hindsight"

=== Video games ===
Year	Title	Role	Notes
2019	Telling Lies	Emma	Full-motion video

== Theatre credits ==
Year	Title	Role	Venue
2006	The Hairy Ape	Mildred Douglas	Irish Repertory Theatre
2006	My Name Is Rachel Corrie	Rachel Corrie (replacement)	Minetta Lane Theatre
2007	Pygmalion	Clara Eynsford-Hill	American Airlines Theatre
2023	The Fears	Thea	Irene Diamond Stage
2025	This World of Tomorrow	Cyndee/Woman Cashier	The Shed

== Awards and nominations ==
Year	Award	Category	Work	Result	Ref.
2012	Hollywood Film Awards	Ensemble of the Year	Argo	Won	
2012	San Diego Film Critics Society Awards	Best Ensemble Performance	Argo	Nominated	
2013	Palm Springs International Film Awards	Ensemble Performance Award	Argo	Won	
2013	Screen Actors Guild Awards	Outstanding Performance by a Cast in a Motion Picture	Argo	Won	
2017	Women's Image Awards	Actress Drama Series	Halt and Catch Fire (for "NeXT")	Nominated	
