= Marsha Dietlein Bennett =

American actress

Marsha Dietlein
- Born: 1965 or 1966 (age 60–61)
- Occupation: Actress
- Years active: 1988–present
- Spouse(s): Tim Dietlein Matthew Bennett (m. 2001)

Marsha Dietlein (born 1965 or 1966) is an American actress best known for her role as Lucy Wilson in the 1988 zombie horror film Return of the Living Dead Part II.

== Early years ==
Marsha Bradley Dietlein Bennett is the daughter of Mr. and Mrs. Robert Bradley. When she was 6 years old the family moved to Sidney, Ohio. She attended schools there until the family moved to Springfield, Ohio, in 1981. She graduated from North High School in Springfield, in 1983. She majored in drama at Brigham Young University (BYU).

When she was 9 years old she joined the Longfellow Rhythmettes, and while she was in junior high school she portrayed one of the children in a production of The Sound of Music by Sidney High School. She was involved in theatrical presentations as a student at both Sidney and North high schools.

== Career ==
As well as Return of the Living Dead Part II, Dietlein has appeared in numerous other films including Only You (1992), Mickey Blue Eyes (1999), Boiler Room (2000), Little Manhattan (2005), Little Children (2006), Winter of Frozen Dreams (2009), Nice Guy Johnny (2010), Newlyweds (2011) and The Fitzgerald Family Christmas (2012).

Dietlein has guests starred on numerous TV shows including Herman's Head, Night Court, Walker, Texas Ranger, Matlock, Without a Trace, Gossip Girl, Third Watch, Law & Order, Law & Order: Special Victims Unit, Law & Order: Criminal Intent, Ed, and Blue Bloods.

== Personal life ==
She met Tim Dietlein when they were involved in a production at BYU. After they married and he graduated, they moved to Glendale, California. They later were divorced.

== Filmography ==
=== Film ===
Year	Title	Role	Notes
1988	Return of the Living Dead Part II	Lucy Wilson	
1992	Eddie Presley	Aspiring Actress #2	
1992	Only You	Mrs. Lipman	
1995	Rumpelstiltskin	Young Mother	
1998	Detention	Louise Germain	
1999	Mickey Blue Eyes	Proposed Girl in Restaurant	
2000	Boiler Room	Susan Reynard	
2005	Little Manhattan	Mother at Party	
2006	Little Children	Cheryl	
2009	Winter of Frozen Dreams	Harry's sister	
2010	Nice Guy Johnny	Nicole	
2011	Newlyweds	Marsha	
2012	The Fitzgerald Family Christmas	Dottie Fitzgerald	
2017	Getting Grace	Venus	
2018	Prepper's Grove	Sarah Simmons	
2018	Unintended	Patricia	
2019	Crypto	Janice	
2019	Beneath the Blue Suburban Skies	Aunt Betty	
2020	My Brothers' Crossing	Terri Lee Clark	

=== Television ===
Year	Title	Role	Notes
1991	Herman's Head	Meredith	Episodes: "Lies, Lies, Lies"
1992	Night Court	Pamela Monroe	Episode: "Opportunity Knock Knocks: Part 1"
1993	Johnny Bago	Marry Morrow	Episode: "Johnny Bago Free at Last"
1993	Based on an Untrue Story	Receptionist	Television film
1993	Walker, Texas Ranger	Frances Clancy	Episode: "Crime Wave Dave"
1994	Matlock	Joanne Walters	Episode: "The Idol"
1995	The George Wendt Show	Carly	Episode: "And Here's to You, Mrs. Robertson"
1995	White Dwarf	Emma	Television film
1997	Falls Road	Joy Cole	Television film
1999, 2008	Law & Order	Dr. Amy Allers / Nicole Hampton	2 episodes
2000	The Michael Richards Show	Quinn	Episode: "Simplification"
2002, 2006, 2009	Law & Order: Criminal Intent	Caroline / Paula Chopauer / Laura Carlson	3 episodes
2003	Without a Trace	Sydney Harrison	2 episodes
2004	Ed	Dakota Cooley	Episode: "The Process"
2004	Third Watch	Josephine Fryar	Episode: "Purgatory"
2005	As the World Turns	Mother	Episode dated 8 April 2005
2006	Law & Order: Special Victims Unit	Mrs. Hoskins	Episode: "Influence"
2010, 2011	Gossip Girl	Cynthia Sharp	2 episodes
2013	Blue Bloods	Mrs. Clarke	Episode: "The Truth About Lying"
2015	Public Morals	Lois	Episode: "No Crazies on the Street"
