= No Looking Back (1998 film) =

- Directed by: Edward Burns
- Written by: Edward Burns
- Produced by: Ted Hope; Michael Nozik; Edward Burns
- Starring: Lauren Holly; Edward Burns; Jon Bon Jovi; Blythe Danner; Connie Britton
- Cinematography: Frank Prinzi
- Edited by: Susan Graef
- Music by: Joe Delia
- Production companies: PolyGram Filmed Entertainment; Good Machine; Marlboro Road Gang; South Fork Pictures
- Distributed by: Gramercy Pictures (United States and Canada); 20th Century Fox (International)
- Release date: March 27, 1998
- Running time: 96 minutes
- Country: United States
- Language: English
- Budget: $5 million
- Box office: $222,099

No Looking Back is a 1998 American drama film directed, written, produced by, and starring Edward Burns. The film centers on the relationship between Charlie (Burns) and Claudia (Lauren Holly). The film had a limited theatrical release and grossed less than $250,000 domestically from its $5 million budget.

== Plot ==
Charlie Ryan (Burns) returns to his hometown after failed attempts at unmentioned endeavors in California. It becomes apparent that his mother no longer finds Charlie's Kerouac-like tendencies to be entertaining as one of her first greetings is telling Charlie she's not going to put up with his crap this time.

At first, Charlie lays low, embarrassed he's returned home empty handed and unaccomplished. Hero to most of his childhood friends, Charlie appears to be the only one who left their small east coast sea-side town after high school. Word does soon travel instigating a visit from one of Charlie's best high school buds. Michael, (Bon Jovi) a thoroughly blue collar kind of guy, is interested in more than just saying hello after all these years. Michael's idea of catching up is letting Charlie know that Claudia and Michael are living together and are planning to be married. Although Charlie tells Michael he is okay with how things have changed, he is shocked and hurt.

Claudia (Holly), it turns out, is a waitress in the small-town luncheonette, complete with skirted pink uniforms and is Charlie's high school sweetheart, whom he left behind in the wake of an unwanted pregnancy and abortion. Charlie visits Claudia at work despite his knowledge of her relationship with Michael. Still hurt from Charlie's post-high school departure, she tells Charlie to leave her alone. Stuck there most of her life and as her 30th birthday approaches, Claudia dreams of bigger things, but is afraid to take a chance.

Other subplots surrounding the love triangle include Claudia's sister, Kelly (Britton) who still lives at home and laments the absence of quality dating material. An even sadder subplot involves Claudia and Kelly's mother (Danner) who still holds a torch for her husband/father of the girls, even though he has left them. Their mother foolishly and unrealistically maintains that her husband will return, repeating to her daughters that he has done this before and came back. Claudia's best friend (Esposito) is so lonely she is willing to throw herself at the recently singled, bald pizza guy.

Making matters worse for Claudia is Michael's desire to get married and settle down, which was discussed before Charlie's return, but is now being sought by Michael in earnest. Beaten down, free-spirit Claudia takes stock of her life and the people around her in the small town and decides she is not ready to be someone's wife, worrying that once she settled for that, it's all she would ever be. Claudia is crushed at her mother's hidden pain and the unrealistic belief that her family will be reunited.

Charlie is finally able to wear Claudia down and she leaves work early at the luncheonette to spend the night with him. Feeling nostalgic and giddy, the two declare their love for each other and begin a plan to run away together. During this conversation, Claudia tells Charlie there were complications with her abortion and is likely unable to have children. They drive to a motel, but once they are alone, both become thoughtful and somber at the potential of their future together. Meanwhile, when Claudia doesn't come home, Michael checks all their regular hang-outs, increasingly suspicious after it appears Charlie is also nowhere to be found. When Michael checks with Claudia's best friend's house, he rebuffs her blatant attempt to seduce him.

Claudia arrives home early the next morning to Michael sitting at their kitchen table, obviously knowing where she has been and what she has done. He tells her he doesn't deserve to be treated this way and angrily tells her to leave for good.

Claudia spends several days of thinking of her life, anguishing over being stuck between Charlie who would offer her excitement, adventure and unpredictability or Michael who would offer her stability, security and a stifling predictability. She consults her mother who has finally come out of her hazy denial after receiving a call from her husband who stated he would not be calling anymore and did not want to be contacted. Her mother tells Claudia to follow her own instincts and make herself happy.

In the last scenes, Claudia tells Charlie she has decided not to leave with him and is also not staying with Michael. She tells Charlie she needs to leave by herself and be on her own for a while. She tells Charlie that he of all people should understand that, to which he agrees. He remarks, "Good luck. Whatever it is you're looking for, I hope you find it".

Suitcase in trunk, Claudia is seen driving away out of town alone looking happily uncertain but determined to make herself happy.

== Cast ==
- Lauren Holly as Claudia
- Edward Burns as Charlie Ryan
- Jon Bon Jovi as Michael
- Blythe Danner as Claudia's Mother
- Connie Britton as Kelly
- Jennifer Esposito as Teresa
- Nick Sandow as Goldie
- John Ventimiglia as Tony the Pizza Guy
- Welker White as Missy
- Kaili Vernoff as Alice

== Production ==
Burns said he originally wanted a budget of $12 million to get more shooting days but he was only able to secure $5 million; he attributes the tepid critical reception and box office of She's the One to the reduction in budget. The movie was shot over 35 days, from April 10 to May 29, 1997, in Rockaway Beach, Queens. Burns found the collaboration with Gramercy Pictures uncomfortable; among changes requested by the production company was abandoning the original title: Long Time, Nothing New.

Burns cast Lauren Holly and Jon Bon Jovi because they had both grown up in small towns in the Northeastern United States - Holly in Upstate New York and Bon Jovi in Sayerville, New Jersey - and Holly's real life experience as a diner waitress.

== Reception ==
On the review aggregator website Rotten Tomatoes, 36% of 22 critics' reviews are positive, with an average rating of 5.2/10. The website's consensus reads: "Edward Burns' first foray into melodrama is too dour to arise passion, suffering from a lack of narrative direction and romantic chemistry."

Leonard Maltin gave the film two out of four stars, writing that while the film "provides a nice lead role for Holly", the cast can't overcome the slight story and the "strong soundtrack overpowers the script." Roger Ebert, writing for the Chicago Sun-Times, also gave the film two stars, writing that while the film attempted to elicit sympathy for the characters, he saw them as "boring slugs" whose unhappiness was avoidable and whose lives were uninteresting, deeming the film "thin and unconvincing." He later included the review in his 2000 book, I Hated, Hated, Hated This Movie.

Todd McCarthy of Variety wrote that the film represented a "watchable but unexciting sidestep" for Burns as a director, citing a lack of complexity and incident, but praised the cinematography and performances.

While at the time he described it as "the most personal film I've ever made. The one that's closest to my heart", Burns later said his friends nicknamed the film Nobody Saw It. After its poor commercial reception, he did not write anything for two years, and decided to return to independent filmmaking: "Now that it bombed and didn't do so well critically, I know never again. I'll only make films the way I want to make them, and I'll live and die by my decisions, not somebody else's."
