= P.T. Walkley =

American singer-songwriter

- Origin: Manhattan, New York City
- Genres: Indie folk, Indie rock
- Occupations: Singer-songwriter, film and tv composer
- Instruments: Guitar, vocals, keyboards
- Formerly of: The Blue Jackets, PT Walkley and the Adventures of Track Rabbit
- Website: ptwalkley.com

P.T. Walkley is an American singer-songwriter and composer for film and television. He is the composer and songwriter for Netflix's Gabby's Dollhouse, which is Netflix’s award winning, number one kid series worldwide, streaming in 160 countries in 17 different languages. He is the songwriter and composer for Nickelodeon television shows Team Umizoomi and Blue's Clues & You!. He has also released several critically acclaimed albums. He and his live band have opened for Weezer (at Hammerstein Ballroom) and Coldplay (at Madison Square Garden), and have played at music festivals such as All Points West. He has collaborated with Meghan Trainor, H.E.R., Cynthia Erivo, Leslie Odom Jr., Yolanda Adams, Chris Jackson, Don Sebesky and Steven Bernstein. He released his first LP as a solo artist, Mr. Macy Wakes Alone, in January 2009, and includes contributions from artists such as Larry Campbell, David Campbell, and Sean Lennon. Walkley has since released two EPs, What's What and The Ghost of Chivalry. Walkley is also part of the musical project The Blue Jackets.

Walkley has also scored and written songs for several major motion pictures, including the Edward Burns films Looking for Kitty, The Groomsmen, Purple Violets, and Nice Guy Johnny, as well as the 2005 film Southern Belles, which starred Anna Faris and Judah Friedlander. Walkley has also composed and licensed music for numerous national advertising campaigns, for clients such as MasterCard, General Electric, Mercedes-Benz, Starbucks, and Macy's. He composed original music for the Ed Burns/Steven Spielberg TV Series "Public Morals" as well as the Nickelodeon television show Team Umizoomi, where he also provides vocals for UmiCar and the Shape Bandit. He has written multiple songs for Sesame Street. In 2021, Walkley wrote the theme song "Hey Gabby!" for Netflix's Gabby's Dollhouse and is the driving force behind the hit series’ music, having written over 200 songs for Gabby’s Dollhouse to date. Gabby’s Dollhouse is the number one Netflix kid series worldwide.
