= Jay Patterson =

American actor (born 1954)

- Born: August 22, 1954 (age 71); Cincinnati, Ohio, United States
- Occupation: Actor
- Years active: 1984–present

Jay Patterson (born August 22, 1954) is an American actor. He has appeared in more than sixty films since 1984.

== Selected filmography ==
=== Film ===
Year	Title	Role	Notes
1984	Places in the Heart	W.E. Simmons	
1985	Heaven Help Us	Brother Constance	
1985	Alamo Bay	Texas Voice #1	
1987	Street Smart	Leonard Pike	
1987	Nadine	Dwight Estes	
1988	D.O.A.	Graham Corey	
1989	Double Exposure: The Story of Margaret Bourke-White	Henry Luce	TV movie
1989	Tailspin: Behind the Korean Airliner Tragedy	Gene	TV movie
1990	Teenage Mutant Ninja Turtles	Charles Pennington	
1991	McBain	Dr. Dalton	
1992	Double Jeopardy	Assistant District Attorney	TV movie
1993	Romeo Is Bleeding	Mona's Lawyer	
1993	Nurses on the Line: The Clash of Flight 7	Graham	TV movie
1994	Nobody's Fool	Jocko	
1995	Excessive Force II: Force on Force	Detective Wayne O'Conner	
1997	American Perfekt	Bernie	
1998	Hard Rain	Mr. Wellman	
1998	City of Angels	Air Traffic Controller	
1998	Slums of Beverly Hills	Dr. Grossman	
1998	A Civil Action	Geologist	
2002	A Gentleman's Game	Golf Pro	
2004	Pet the Goat	Luntz	Video Short film
2005	Love, Ludlow	Storkelson	
2005	The Exonerated	Cop #2	TV movie
2006	Send in the Clown	Ron Watson	
2006	Brother's Shadow	Alaskan Parole Officer	
2006	Death of a President	Sam McCarthy	
2006	All the King's Men	Senator	
2007	Gracie	Boardmember Rice	
2007	Purple Violets	Book Editor	
2007	The Babysitters	Ira	
2008	Soldier's Heart	Commercial Director	
2008	My Sassy Girl	Roger Bellow	
2010	My Own Love Song	Neighbor	
2010	Nice Guy Johnny	Dr. Meadows	
2013	Isn't It Delicious	Dr. Buckley	
2014	A Million Ways to Die in the West	Dr. Harper	
2014	Rickover: The Birth of Nuclear Power	McShane	
2014	Mary and Louise	Roguish Gentleman #4	Short film
2015	Ted 2	Karl Jackson	
2016	Nine Lives	Benson	
2016	Norman	Amos Chertoff	

=== Television ===
Year	Title	Role	Notes
1984	Miami Vice	Billie Joe Higgins	Episode: "Glades"
1985	American Playhouse	Edward Pierce	Episode: "Charlotte Forten's Mission: Experiment in Freedom"
1987	Spenser: For Hire	Al Sheen	Episode: "The Man Who Wasn't There"
1988	The Equalizer	Jay Trescott	Episode: "The Last Campaign"
1990–2003	Law & Order	Maxie, Charles Heckstrom, Conn. ADA Jack O'Connell, Hoexter	4 episodes
1991	All My Children	Bert Darlow	3 episodes
1993	L.A. Law	Mr. Colquit	Episode: "Testing, Testing, 1... 2... 3... 4..."
1994	Home and Away	Dylan Parrish	7 episodes
1994	NYPD Blue	Tim Miller	Episode: "Trials and Tribulations"
1994	The Boys Are Back	Mr. Rathke	Episode: "Fred Runs Away"
1995	Murder, She Wrote	Noah Farmer	Episode: "The Dream Team"
1997	Promised Land	Stan Borgstrom	Episode: "St. Russell"
2000	Now and Again	Man in Library	Episode: "There Are No Words"
2000	Touched by an Angel	Russell Tate	Episode: "Monica's Bad Day"
2002	One Life to Live	Motel Clerk	Episode: #1.8699
2004	Third Watch	Andy Fryer	Episode: "Purgatory"
2004–2006	Law & Order: Criminal Intent	Benton Williams and Terrence Boyd	2 episodes
2008–2015	Law & Order: Special Victims Unit	Federal Judge Williams Evans, Lt. James Reed	3 episodes
2012	Blue Bloods	Dennis Driscoll	Episode: "Whistle Blower"
2014	The Louise Log	The Pitbull	Episode: "How to Go Rogue"
2016	Crisis in Six Scenes	Anchorman #1	Episode: #1.1
2022	Leverage Redemption	General Lionel Frick	Episode #2.5: "The Walk in the Woods Job"

=== Videogames ===
Year	Title	Role
2009	Grand Theft Auto IV: The Lost and Damned	David 'Dave' Grossman
2010	Red Dead Redemption	The Local Population
2018	Red Dead Redemption 2	The Local Pedestrian Population
