= Peter Gerety =

American actor

- Born: 17 May 1940 (age 86); Providence, Rhode Island
- Occupation: Actor
- Years active: 1981–present

Peter Gerety (born 17 May 1940) is an American actor. He played officer, later detective, Stuart Gharty on Homicide: Life on the Street (1996–1999), and Judge Daniel Phelan in The Wire (2002–2008).

== Career ==
Gerety is a veteran of stage, screen and television. In early 1992, he performed to critical acclaim on Broadway in Conversations with My Father, starring Judd Hirsch, and in Harold Pinter's Hothouse. He has since performed in many more plays both on and off-Broadway, most recently in Martin McDonagh's The Lieutenant of Inishmore.

In the late 1990s, he joined the cast of the Barry Levinson produced NBC police drama Homicide: Life on the Street. He played FBI Agt. Franklin Morgan in the short-lived American adaptation of Life on Mars. In the final season of Brotherhood as Martin Kilpatrick. He appears in the 2011 NBC series Prime Suspect as Maria Bello's father.

He also appeared in such feature films as K-Pax, People I Know, The Curse of the Jade Scorpion, Hollywood Ending, Wolf, Charlie Wilson's War, Surviving Picasso, War of the Worlds, Things That Hang from Trees, Inside Man, and Changeling. He played Louis Piquett in Public Enemies (2009), directed by Michael Mann, and had a small part in Mel Gibson's Get the Gringo (2011). In 2013, Gerety was playing the role of John Cotter in Nora Ephron's Broadway play Lucky Guy with Tom Hanks. From 2015 to 2019, Gerety played Otto Bernhardt, the patriarch in the Amazon Prime series Sneaky Pete.

== Filmography ==
=== Film ===
Year	Title	Role	Notes
1984	The House of God	P.R. Man #1	
1985	The Little Sister	Officer Burke	
1985	Papa Was a Preacher	Billy Kilgore	
1991	Complex World	Biker	
1994	Wolf	George	
1994	Miracle on 34th Street	Cop	
1996	Mrs. Winterbourne	Father Brian Kilraine	
1996	Sleepers	Juvenile Lawyer	Uncredited
1996	Surviving Picasso	Marcel	
1997	Arresting Gena	Mr. Patterson	
1998	Montana	Mike	
1998	Went to Coney Island on a Mission from God... Be Back by Five	Maurice	
2000	The Legend of Bagger Vance	Neskaloosa	
2001	The Curse of the Jade Scorpion	Ned	
2001	K-PAX	Sal	
2002	Hollywood Ending	Psychiatrist	
2002	Ash Wednesday	Uncle Handy	
2002	Pinocchio	Farmer / Mustache Man	
2002	People I Know	Norris Volpe	
2003	Virgin	Mr. Reynolds	
2004	Second Best	Marshall	
2004	Looking for Kitty	Gus Maplethorpe	
2004	Indocumentados	O'Brien	
2005	Runaway	Mo	
2005	War of the Worlds	Hatch Boss / Load Manager	
2005	Syriana	Leland Janus	
2006	Things That Hang from Trees	Ump	
2006	Inside Man	Captain Coughlin	
2007	Charlie Wilson's War	Larry Liddle	
2008	Phoebe in Wonderland	Dr. Miles / Humpty Dumpty	
2008	Stop-Loss	Carlson	
2008	Leatherheads	Commissioner	
2008	Changeling	Dr. Earl W. Tarr	
2008	The Loss of a Teardrop Diamond	Mr. Van Hooven	
2009	Paul Blart: Mall Cop	Chief Brooks	
2009	My Dog Tulip	Mr. Plum / Pugilist	
2009	Public Enemies	Louis Piquett	
2012	Get the Gringo	Embassy Guy	
2012	Flight	Avington Carr	
2013	Muhammad Ali's Greatest Fight	William Brennan	
2014	God's Pocket	McKenna	
2014	Cymbeline	Dr. Cornelius	
2014	A Most Violent Year	Bill O'Leary	
2018	Change in the Air	Arnie Bayberry	
2019	Working Man	Allery Parkes	
2023	Boston Strangler	Eddie Corsetti	
2026	Pizza Movie	Grandpa	
2026	Handle with Care	Ardie	

=== Television ===
Year	Title	Role	Notes
1981	The House of Mirth	Jack	TV movie
1983	The Demon Murder Case	Officer Andrew Brooks	TV movie
1983	First Affair	Taxi Driver	TV movie
1984, 1985	American Playhouse	Archie / Edwin H. Fearon	2 episodes
1986	A Case of Deadly Force	Bobby Doyle	TV movie
1988	Ollie Hopnoodle's Haven of Bliss	Gertz	TV movie
1990	The Kennedys of Massachusetts	Irish Driver	3 episodes
1993	Return to Lonesome Dove	Thompkins / Cowboy	2 episodes
1994	Cagney & Lacey: The Return	Sgt. Matt Nelson	TV movie
1995	Central Park West	John / Editor	5 episodes
1995–2003	Law & Order	Charles Powell / Dean Connors	3 episodes
1996	Public Morals (Note: Public Morals (1996 TV series) is a sitcom, Public Morals (2015 TV series) is a drama)	Neil Fogerty	Main cast
1996–1998	Homicide: Life on the Street	Stuart Gharty	3 episodes (seasons 4–5), Main cast (seasons 6–7)
1998	Remember WENN	Chet Randolph	Episode: "Work Shift"
1998	Soldier of Fortune, Inc.	Marshal Joseph McClintock	Episode: "Who's Who"
2000	Homicide: The Movie	Lieutenant Stuart Gharty	TV movie
2000	Third Watch	Bernie Peterson	Episode: "Just Another Night at the Opera"
2000, 2001	Ed	Dick Knight	2 episodes
2002	The Job	O'Malley	Episode: "Sacrilege"
2002	Law & Order: Criminal Intent	George Dawkins	Episode: "Anti-Thesis"
2002	Benjamin Franklin	Joseph Galloway	Miniseries, main cast
2002–2008	The Wire	Judge Daniel Phelan	Recurring role (seasons 1–3, 5)
2005	Law & Order: Trial by Jury	Dean Connors	Episode: "Truth or Consequences"
2006	The Bedford Diaries	Dean Harold Harper	Recurring role
2006	Conviction	Father McMillan	2 episodes
2006	Kidnapped	Conrad's Father	Episode: "Special Delivery"
2007	The Black Donnellys	Bob The Mouth	Episode: "The Only Thing Sure"
2007	American Experience	Robert Bartlett	Episode: "Alexander Hamilton"
2007–2013	Law & Order: Special Victims Unit	Judge Harrison	4 episodes
2008	Brotherhood	Martin Kilpatrick	6 episodes
2009	Life on Mars	Agent Frank Morgan	2 episodes
2009–2010	Brothers & Sisters	Dennis York	Recurring role (season 4)
2009–2010	Mercy	Jimmy Flanagan	Recurring role
2010	Rubicon	David Hadas	3 episodes
2010, 2011	Blue Bloods	Bishop Donovan	2 episodes
2010–2013	The Good Wife	Judge Timothy Stanek	3 episodes
2011–2012	Prime Suspect	Desmond Timoney	Main cast
2013–2014	Elementary	Frank Da Silva	2 episodes
2015	Madam Secretary	Governor Caleb Lockwood	Episode: "Standoff"
2015	Daredevil	Silke	Episode: "Cut Man"
2015	Public Morals	Sergeant Mike Muldoon	Recurring role
2015–2019	Sneaky Pete	Otto Bernhardt	Main cast
2016–2017	Mercy Street	Dr. Alfred Summers	Main cast (season 1, season 2 premiere episode)
2017	The Immortal Life of Henrietta Lacks	Paul Lurz	TV movie
2017, 2018	The Good Fight	Judge Timothy Stanek	2 episodes
2019–2020	Ray Donovan	James Sullivan	Recurring role (season 7)
2019, 2021	City on a Hill	Al Farisi	2 episodes
2021	Prodigal Son	Archbishop Argento	Episode: "Speak of the Devil"
2022	The Marvelous Mrs. Maisel	Clifford	Episode: "Everything is Bellmore"
2022	The Girl from Plainville	Conrad Roy Sr.	Episode: "Star-Crossed Lovers and Things Like That"
