= Brian d'Arcy James =

American actor and musician (born 1968)

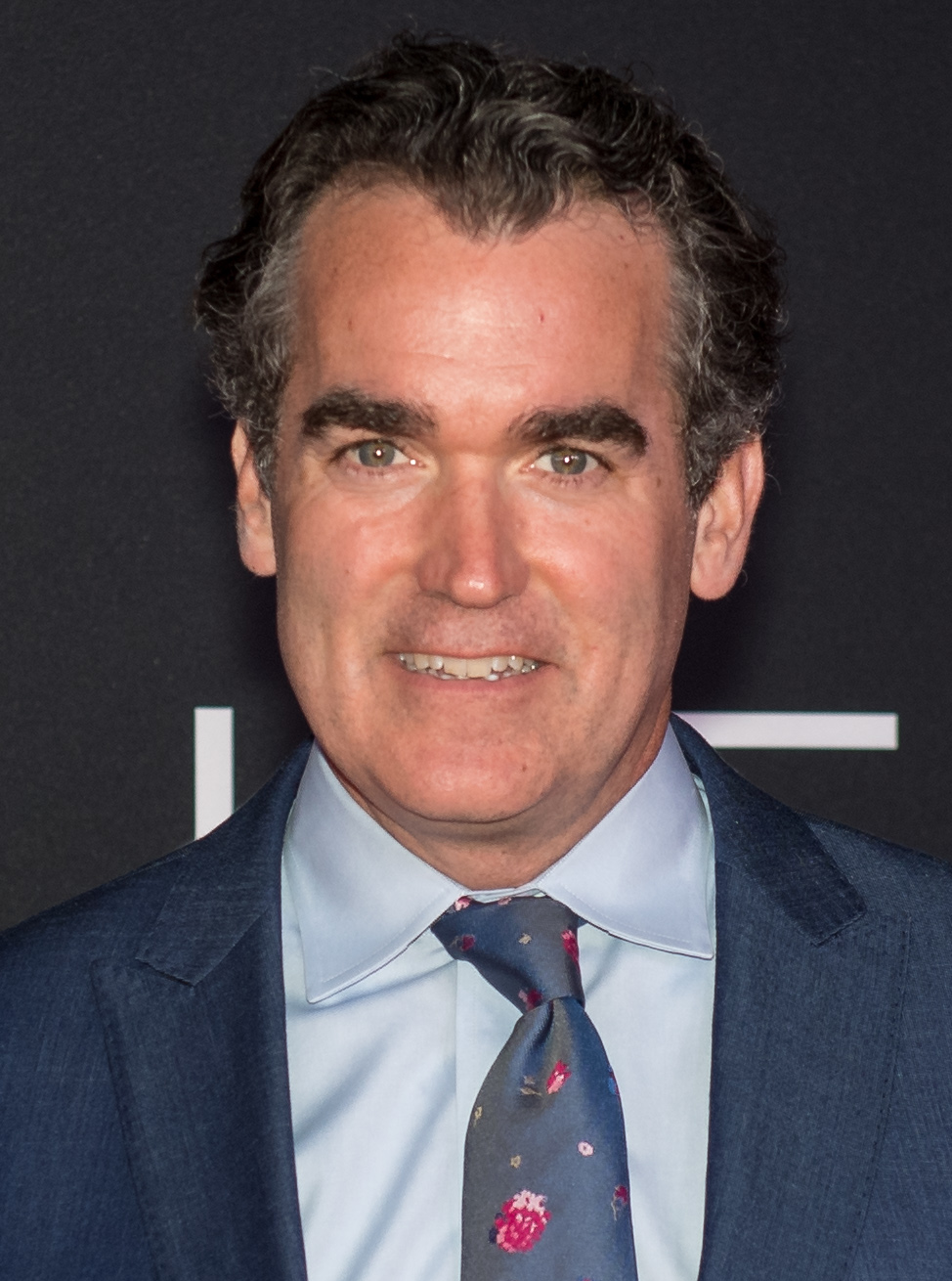
- James in 2018
- Born: June 29, 1968 (age 58); Saginaw, Michigan, U.S.
- Education: Northwestern University (BA)
- Occupations: Actor, musician
- Years active: 1988–present
- Known for: Shrek The Musical; Something Rotten! Hamilton; Into the Woods
- Spouse: Jennifer Prescott (m. 1998)
- Children: 1
- Relatives: Brian Kelly (maternal uncle); Harry F. Kelly (maternal grandfather)

Brian d'Arcy James (born June 29, 1968) is an American actor and musician. He is known primarily for his Broadway roles, including Shrek in Shrek the Musical, Nick Bottom in Something Rotten!, King George III in Hamilton, and The Baker in Into the Woods. He has received five Tony Award nominations for his work. On-screen, he is known for his recurring role as Andy Baker on the Netflix series 13 Reasons Why, Officer Krupke in West Side Story, and reporter Matt Carroll in Spotlight.

== Early life and education ==
James was born in Saginaw, Michigan, the son of Mary (née Kelly), a seller of children's books, and Thomas F James (deceased), a lawyer. His maternal grandfather was Harry Kelly, a former Governor of Michigan. His uncle, Brian Kelly, was an actor featured in the series Flipper and a producer of the movie Blade Runner. He has three siblings: brother Andrew, a portfolio manager; sister Kate, an actress and writer; and sister Anne (Noonan), an actress and teacher. James is of seven eighths Irish and one eighth Welsh descent.

James graduated from Northwestern University's School of Communication.

== Career ==
He received a nomination for the Tony Award for Best Featured Actor in a Musical in 2002 for his portrayal of Sidney Falco in Sweet Smell of Success, co-starring John Lithgow. He received an Obie Award for his performance in Conor McPherson's one-man play The Good Thief.

James's additional Broadway credits include Titanic (Frederick Barrett), Lincoln Center's Carousel, and Blood Brothers. His Off-Broadway credits include Andrew Lippa's The Wild Party in 2000 opposite Julia Murney and Idina Menzel, for which he received a Drama Desk Award nomination, as well as Adam Guettel's Floyd Collins and the Gershwins' Pardon My English. He appeared in Martin McDonagh's The Lieutenant of Inishmore on Broadway, replaced Norbert Leo Butz in Dirty Rotten Scoundrels, and starred in The Apple Tree opposite Kristin Chenoweth. In 2004, James released a Christmas album titled From Christmas Eve to Christmas Morn. On Broadway he played Bob Wallace, a character originated by Bing Crosby, in White Christmas in 2004. He played Dan Goodman in the new musical Next to Normal Off-Broadway at Second Stage Theater in 2008. He then starred opposite Daniel Breaker, Sutton Foster, and Christopher Sieber as the titular character in Shrek The Musical. The show began previews on Broadway November 8, 2008, and opened on December 14 at The Broadway Theatre after a tryout in Seattle. For this role he won the Outer Critics Circle Award for Outstanding Actor in a Musical and the Drama Desk Award for Outstanding Actor in a Musical. He was also nominated for the Tony Award for Best Actor in a Musical for his portrayal. He departed the cast after one year in the role and was replaced by Ben Crawford.

James starred in the Broadway play Time Stands Still, which began preview performances on January 5, 2010, and officially opened on January 25 at the Samuel J. Friedman Theatre. The show ended its limited run on March 27, 2010. For this role he won the Broadway.com Audience Award for Favorite Featured Actor in a Play. He reprised the role of Dan Goodman in the Broadway company of Next to Normal at the Booth Theatre. He replaced J. Robert Spencer on May 17, 2010. James ended his limited engagement on July 18, 2010, and was replaced by Jason Danieley.

On July 19, 2010, James performed in front of President Barack Obama and First Lady Michelle Obama at A Broadway Celebration: In Performance at the White House, which also aired on PBS October 20, 2010. He returned to Time Stands Still when the show returned to Broadway. It closed on January 30, 2011. James was part of the cast of the NBC musical series Smash. NBC officially picked up Smash as a series on May 11, 2011. The program made its series premiere on February 6, 2012. He did not return to the show as a series regular for its second and final season. James starred in Torstein Blixfjord's 2012 short film Bird In A Box.

He co-hosted the 57th Drama Desk Awards with Brooke Shields on June 3, 2012. He performed at the 29th birthday celebration of The New York Pops, titled "Journey On", celebrating the work of Stephen Flaherty and Lynn Ahrens; he performed "Wheels of a Dream" from Ragtime. James starred as Bick in the musical Giant which ran at the Public Theater from October 26 to December 16, 2012. For this role James received nominations for the Drama Desk Award for Best Actor in a Musical and for the Drama League Award for Distinguished Performance.

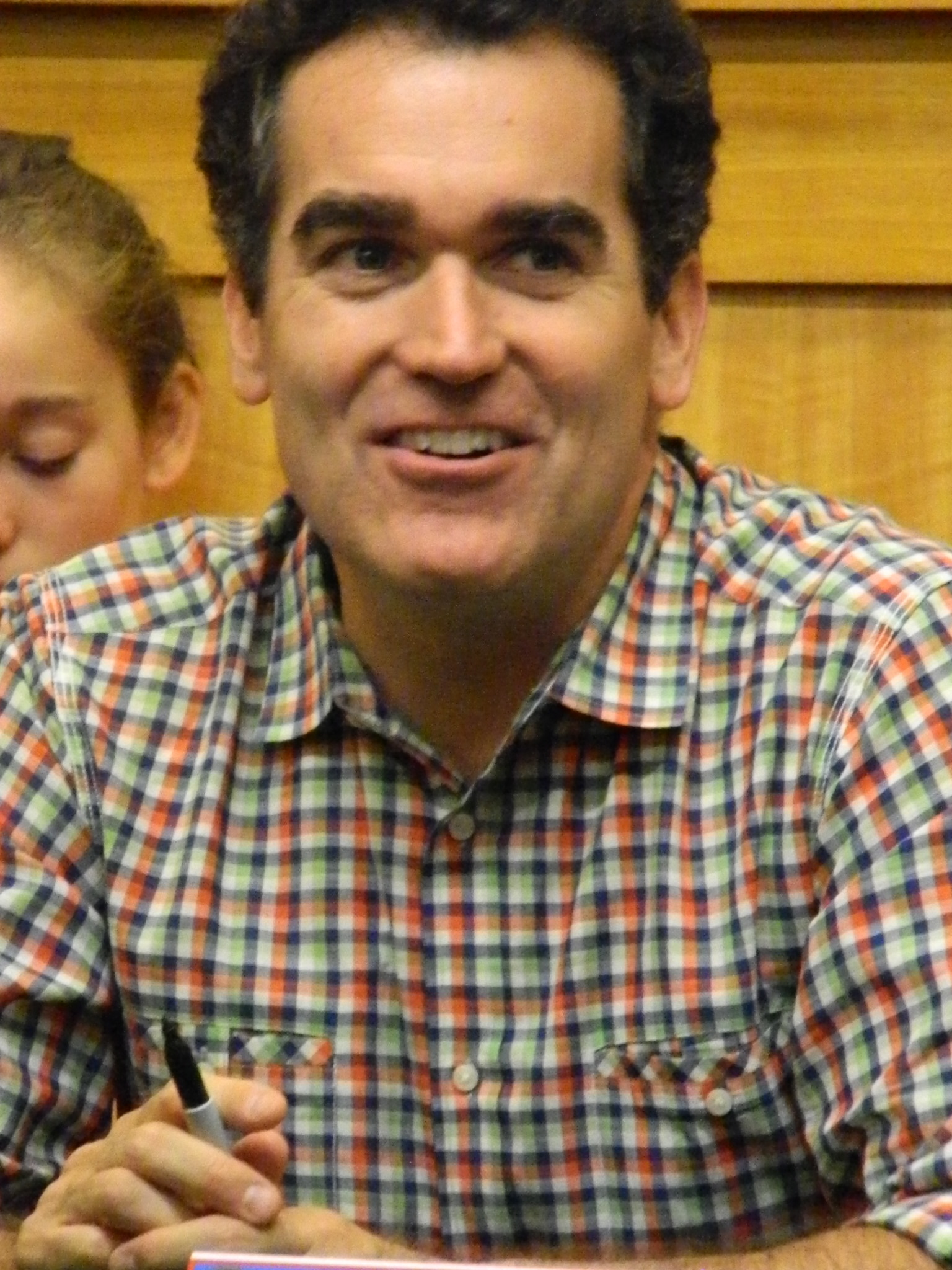
James visiting a New York Barnes & Noble location for CD signing

He played Banquo in the Lincoln Center Theater production of Macbeth, which began previews in October 2013 and officially opened at the Vivian Beaumont Theater in November 2013. He starred as the original King George III in the Off-Broadway production of the musical Hamilton, with previews starting January 20, 2015, and officially opening on February 17. Actor Jonathan Groff replaced James in the Off-Broadway run on March 3, 2015.

He starred in the Broadway musical Something Rotten!, which opened in previews at the St. James Theatre on March 23, 2015, and officially on April 22, for which he received his third Tony nomination. James played Matt Carroll in the 2015 film Spotlight. In March 2016, James was cast in the CBS pilot Superior Donuts, but his role was recast after the show went through some retooling. He reprised his role as King George III in the Broadway production of Hamilton for a limited engagement that began on April 13, 2017, and continued through July 16, 2017.

In 2017, James played Andy Baker in the Netflix drama series 13 Reasons Why, a role he later reprised in the second season of the show in 2018. Also in 2018, James played pilot Joseph A. Walker in Damien Chazelle's film First Man. In May 2018, it was announced that he would star in the upcoming Fox series Proven Innocent. The following month, however, it was announced that Kelsey Grammer had been cast to replace James in the role of Gore Bellows (previously Cole Bellows).

James starred in the Broadway play The Ferryman at the Bernard B. Jacobs Theatre as Quinn Carney beginning on February 19, 2019, replacing Paddy Considine, who originated the role. In December 2020, it was announced he would appear in the Disney+ miniseries Hawkeye.

In May 2022, it was announced that James would star as the Baker in a Broadway revival of Into the Woods at the St. James Theatre. He remained with the show through September 4, 2022. James returned to the production on October 25, 2022. He played his final performance on January 1, 2023, when Sebastian Arcelus returned to the show for its final week of performances. For his performance, James received his third Tony Award nomination for Best Actor in a Musical, his fourth nomination overall.

James originated the role of Joe Clay in the premiere production of Days of Wine and Roses at the Off-Broadway Linda Gross Theater in summer 2023. In September of the same year, it was announced that the production would transfer to Studio 54 on Broadway, with James reprising his role. He was nominated for a Tony Award for Best Actor in a Musical and was also a recipient of the Drama Desk Award for Outstanding Lead Performance in a Musical for his performance.

James will play Chris Christopherson in a revival of Eugene O'Neill's play Anna Christie alongside Michelle Williams and Tom Sturridge at St. Ann's Warehouse from November 25, 2025 to February 1, 2026.

== Personal life ==
James is married to Jennifer Prescott; the two met when they both performed at Lincoln Center. They have one daughter.

== Theatre credits ==
Year	Show	Role	Notes
1988–89	Les Misérables	Courfeyrac / Chain Gang / Ensemble	3rd National Tour
1993	Blood Brothers	Ensemble u/s Mickey	Broadway
1994	Carousel	Captain / Principal / Hudson Livermore u/s David Bascombe u/s Jigger Craigin	Broadway
1994	Public Enemy	Davey Boyd	Off-Broadway
1995	Follies	Young Buddy	Regional
1996	Floyd Collins	Clif Roney/Reporter	Off-Broadway
1997–98	Titanic	Frederick Barrett	Broadway
1998	Chess	Freddie Trumper	NY Concert
1998	Kelly	Kelly	Off-Off-Broadway
1999	Chess	Anatoly Sergievsky	Alliance Theatre
2000	The Wild Party	Burrs	Off-Broadway
2000	Into the Woods	The Baker	Ordway Center for the Performing Arts
2001	The Good Thief	Man	Off-Broadway
2001	Chess	Freddie Trumper	Off-Broadway
2002	Sweet Smell of Success	Sidney	Broadway
2003	Dirty Rotten Scoundrels	Freddie	Reading
2003	Harmony	Performer	Regional
2004	Pardon My English	Gob Schmidt	Off-Broadway
2004	White Christmas	Bob Wallace	Regional
2005	Dirty Rotten Scoundrels	Freddie	Broadway
2005	Children and Art	Performer	Broadway
2005	Flight	Reporter	Off-Broadway
2005	Annie Get Your Gun	Frank E. Butler	The Muny
2005	White Christmas	Bob Wallace	Boston
2005	The Apple Tree	Adam / Sanjar / Flip	Off-Broadway
2006	The Lieutenant of Inishmore	Brendan	Off-Broadway
2006	The Lieutenant of Inishmore	Brendan	Broadway
2006	Young Frankenstein	Frederick Frankenstein	Workshop
2006–07	The Apple Tree	Adam/Sanjar/Flip	Broadway
2007	White Christmas	Bob Wallace	Boston
2008	Next to Normal	Dan Goodman	Off-Broadway
2008	Port Authority	Dermont	Off-Broadway
2008	Shrek the Musical	Shrek	Pre-Broadway
2008-09	Shrek the Musical	Shrek	Broadway
2010	Next to Normal	Dan Goodman	Broadway
2010–11	Time Stands Still	James Dodd	Broadway
2012	Giant	Bick	Off-Broadway
2013	Finding Neverland	J. M. Barrie	Workshop
2013–14	Macbeth	Banquo	Broadway
2014	Hamilton	King George III	Workshop
2015	Hamilton	King George III	Off-Broadway
2015–16	Something Rotten!	Nick Bottom	Broadway
2017	Hamilton	King George III	Broadway
2019	The Ferryman	Quinn Carney	Broadway
2022	Into the Woods	The Baker	Broadway
2022–23	Into the Woods	The Baker	Broadway
2023	Days of Wine and Roses	Joe Clay	Off-Broadway
2023	Gutenberg! The Musical!	The Producer (One night cameo)	Broadway
2024	Days of Wine and Roses	Joe Clay	Broadway
2025	Eurydice	Father	Off-Broadway
2025–26	Anna Christie	Chris Christopherson	Off-Broadway

== Discography ==
=== Cast albums ===
- Days of Wine and Roses [Original Cast Recording]
- Into the Woods [Original 2022 Broadway Revival Cast]
- Something Rotten! [Original Broadway Cast]
- Giant [Original Cast]
- Shrek the Musical [Original Broadway Cast]
- White Christmas [Original Cast]
- Sweet Smell of Success [Original Broadway Cast]
- The Wild Party [Original Off-Broadway Cast]
- Titanic [Original Broadway Cast]
- Dream True [World Premiere Cast]
- Brownstone [Studio Cast]
- The Stephen Schwartz Album [Studio Cast]
- Myths and Hymns [Off-Broadway Original Cast]
- Violet [Off-Broadway Original Cast]
- Far From the Madding Crowd [Studio Cast]
- The Civil War [Studio Cast]
- The Stephen Sondheim Album [Studio Cast]
- Floyd Collins [Original Cast]
- Carousel [Revival Cast]
- James and the Giant Peach [Studio Cast]
- The Other Josh Cohen [Studio Cast]
- A Little More Alive [Demo Complication]

=== Solo recordings ===
- From Christmas Eve to Christmas Morn (debut solo album)
- Michigan Christmas (single)

=== Featured recordings ===
- The Maury Yeston Compilation (featured artist)
- Jonathan Franzen's How to Be Alone (featured artist)
- Elegies for Angels, Punks and Raging Queens New York (featured artist)

== Filmography ==
=== Film ===
Year	Title	Role	Notes
1997	Sax and Violins		
1999	Exiled	Brinkley	
2002	G	Lloyd	
2004	Neurotica	Andrew	
2008	Ghost Town	Irish Eddie	
2011	Friends with Kids	Husband in Restaurant	
2012	The Fitzgerald Family Christmas	Skippy	
2012	Bird in a Box	Walter	
2013	Admission	Billy Flynn	
2013	Shrek the Musical	Shrek	Filmed stage production
2014	Time Out of Mind	Mark	
2015	Spotlight	Matt Carroll	
2015	Sisters	Jerry	
2017	Rebel in the Rye	Giroux	
2017	Trouble	Logan	
2017	Molly's Game	Brad Marion	
2017	Mark Felt: The Man Who Brought Down the White House	Robert Kunkel	
2017	1922	Sheriff Jones	
2018	Song of Back and Neck	Stone	
2018	All These Small Moments	Tom Sheffield	
2018	First Man	Joseph A. Walker	
2019	Dark Phoenix	President of the United States	Cameo
2019	The Kitchen	Jimmy Brennan	
2019	Beneath the Blue Suburban Skies		
2019	Bombshell	Brian Wilson	Uncredited
2021	The Cathedral	Richard Damrosch	
2021	West Side Story	Police Sergeant Krupke	
2023	She Came to Me	Trey	
2023	Devil's Peak	Bo	
2023	Pain Hustlers	Dr. Nathan Lydell	
2024	Millers in Marriage	Dennis	
2025	The Family McMullen	Walter	
2026	Finnegan's Foursome	TBA	
TBA	Dedicated to Morris Burke †		Filming

=== Television ===
Year	Title	Role	Notes
1997	The City	Mark/Ned Ashton	2 episodes
1999	Great Performances	Performer (Duets with Susan Egan)	Episode: “Rodgers & Hart Story: Thou Swell, Thou Witty”
2001	The Education of Max Bickford	Barry Sheppard/Gary	2 episodes
2002	Monday Night Mayhem	Al Michaels	Television film
2006	Rescue Me	Veterinarian	Episode: "Discovery"
2011	Person of Interest	Wheeler	Episode: "Pilot"
2012	Game Change	Ted Frank	Television film
2012	The Big C	Tim	3 episodes
2012–13	Smash	Frank Houston	18 episodes
2013	It Could Be Worse	Happy	Episode: "I Forgive You!"
2013	The Good Wife	Detective Nolan	Episode: "Rape: A Modern Perspective"
2013	Ironside	Bill Broughton	Episode: "Pilot"
2014	Submissions Only	Read Whatley	Episode: "Petit Sweet Ending with N"
2014	Law & Order: Special Victims Unit	Adam Brubeck	Episode: "Producer's Backend"
2014	Hoke	Henry Hickey	Pilot
2014	The Funtastix	Andrew	Pilot
2015	Mozart in the Jungle	Beethoven	Episode: "Amusia"
2016	Superior Donuts	Arthur	Pilot
2017–18	13 Reasons Why	Andy Baker	Recurring (season 1); main (season 2)
2017	Manhunt: Unabomber	Henry Murray	Episode: "Ted"
2019	Last Week Tonight with John Oliver	HBO's Lawyer	Episode: "SLAPP Suits"
2020	Devs	Anton	Episode #1.2
2020	The Comey Rule	Mark Giuliano	Miniseries
2021	Hawkeye	Derek Bishop	Episode: "Never Meet Your Heroes"
2021	Centaurworld	The General (voice)	3 episodes
2021–24	Evil	Victor LeConte	7 episodes
2022	How We Roll		Executive producer
2023	Dear Edward	Mr. Adler	Recurring role
2023	Love & Death	Fred Fason	2 episodes
2023	Captain Fall	(voice)	Episode: "An Unconventional Cruise Line"
2025	The Copenhagen Test	Peter Moira	8 episodes

=== Video games ===
Year	Title	Role	Notes
2003	Medal of Honor: Rising Sun	Davis/Pvt. Brooks	

== Awards and nominations ==
Year	Award	Category	Nominated Work	Result
2000	Drama Desk Award	Outstanding Actor in a Musical	The Wild Party	Nominated
2001	Drama Desk Award	Outstanding Solo Performance	The Good Thief	Nominated
2002	Tony Award	Best Featured Actor in a Musical	Sweet Smell of Success	Nominated
2002	Drama Desk Award	Best Featured Actor in a Musical	Sweet Smell of Success	Nominated
2008	Drama League Award	Distinguished Performance Award	Next to Normal	Nominated
2008	Drama Desk Award	Outstanding Actor in a Musical	Port Authority	Nominated
2009	Drama Desk Award	Outstanding Actor in a Musical	Shrek the Musical	Won
2009	Tony Award	Best Actor in a Musical	Shrek the Musical	Nominated
2009	Outer Critics Circle Award	Best Actor in a Musical	Shrek the Musical	Won
2009	Drama League Award	Distinguished Performance	Shrek the Musical	Nominated
2012	Drama Desk Award	Outstanding Actor in a Musical	Giant	Nominated
2015	Drama Desk Award	Outstanding Actor in a Musical	Something Rotten!	Nominated
2015	Tony Award	Best Actor in a Musical	Something Rotten!	Nominated
2015	Outer Critics Circle Award	Best Actor in a Musical	Something Rotten!	Nominated
2015	Drama League Award	Distinguished Performance	Something Rotten!	Nominated
2015	Lucille Lortel Award	Best Featured Actor in a Musical	Hamilton	Nominated
2015	Gotham Award	Best Ensemble Performance	Spotlight	Won
2015	Independent Spirit Award	Robert Altman Award	Spotlight	Won
2015	Satellite Award	Best Cast in a Motion Picture	Spotlight	Won
2015	Boston Online Film Critics Association Award	Best Ensemble	Spotlight	Won
2015	Boston Society of Film Critics	Best Cast	Spotlight	Won
2015	Washington D.C. Area Film Critics Association Award	Best Ensemble	Spotlight	Won
2015	Detroit Film Critics Society Award	Best Ensemble	Spotlight	Won
2015	Las Vegas Film Critics Society	Best Ensemble	Spotlight	Won
2015	New York Film Critics Online Award	Best Ensemble Cast	Spotlight	Won
2015	Phoenix Film Critics Society Award	Best Acting Ensemble	Spotlight	Won
2015	San Diego Film Critics Society Award	Best Ensemble	Spotlight	Nominated
2015	Southeastern Film Critics Award	Best Ensemble	Spotlight	Won
2015	Florida Film Critics Circle	Best Ensemble	Spotlight	Won
2015	Nevada Film Critics Society Award	Best Ensemble Cast	Spotlight	Won
2016	Screen Actors Guild Award	Outstanding Performance by a Cast in a Motion Picture	Spotlight	Won
2016	Critics' Choice Movie Award	Best Acting Ensemble	Spotlight	Won
2016	Alliance of Women Film Journalists	Best Ensemble Cast	Spotlight	Won
2016	Central Ohio Film Critics Association	Best Ensemble	Spotlight	Won
2016	Georgia Film Critics Association	Best Ensemble	Spotlight	Won
2016	Grammy Award	Best Musical Theater Album	Something Rotten!	Nominated
2023	Grammy Award	Best Musical Theater Album	Into the Woods	Won
2023	Tony Award	Best Actor in a Musical	Into the Woods	Nominated
2023	Independent Spirit Award	Best Supporting Performance	The Cathedral	Nominated
2024	Tony Award	Best Actor in a Musical	Days of Wine and Roses	Nominated
2024	Drama Desk Award	Outstanding Lead Performance in a Musical	Days of Wine and Roses	Won
2024	Outer Critics Circle Award	Lead Performer in a Musical	Days of Wine and Roses	Nominated
2026	Outer Critics Circle Award	Outstanding Featured Performer in an Off-Broadway Play	Eurydice	Nominated
