= Anita Gillette =

American actress and singer (born 1936)

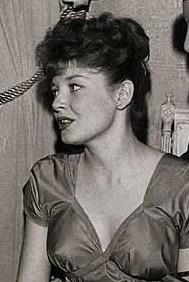
- Gillette in 1960
- Born: Anita Luebben; August 16, 1936 (age 90); Baltimore, Maryland, U.S.
- Occupations: Actress; singer
- Years active: 1959–present
- Spouse(s): William Gillette (m. 1957; div. 1967) Armand Coullet (m. 1982; died 1999)
- Children: 2

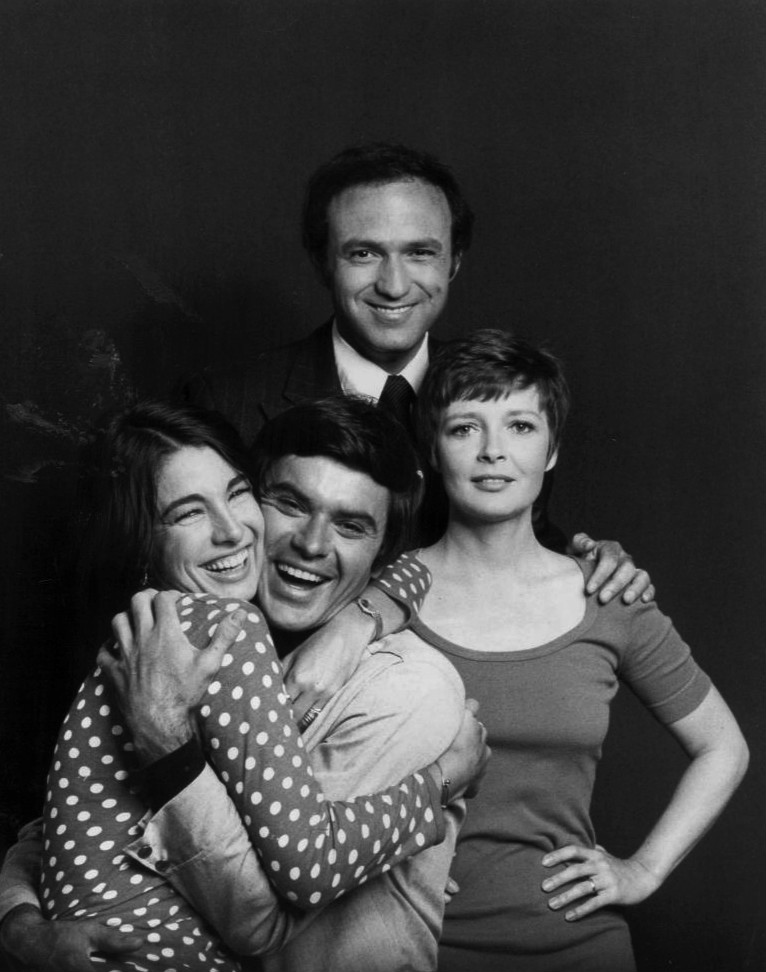
From TV series Bob & Carol & Ted & Alice (1973). Back: David Spielberg; front, L–R: Anne Archer, Robert Urich, Anita Gillette.

Anita Gillette (née Luebben; born August 16, 1936) is an American actress and singer. She has performed numerous roles on Broadway and American television, and in feature films.

Her Broadway credits include performing in musical productions of Gypsy, Carnival!, Guys and Dolls, They're Playing Our Song, Mr. President, and Cabaret. In 1978, she was nominated for the Tony Award for Best Actress in a Play at the 32nd Tony Awards for her performance in Neil Simon's Chapter Two.

== Early life ==
Raised in Rossville, Maryland, Anita Gillette graduated from Kenwood High School and studied at the Peabody Conservatory.

== Career ==
=== Television and film ===
Gillette's first television appearance was on The Ed Sullivan Show in 1963. She joined the cast of The Edge of Night in 1967, leaving the next year. Gillette's biggest exposure on a national scale came as a celebrity guest on various New York City-based game shows, mostly those produced by Goodson-Todman and Bob Stewart. She served as a semi-regular on the syndicated What's My Line?, Match Game, and the Pyramid series. She also appeared with Robert Alda as a panelist on Fast Draw.

Gillette's roles in the 1970s included the short-lived series Me and the Chimp with Ted Bessell and Bob & Carol & Ted & Alice with a then-unknown Robert Urich and a young Jodie Foster. She also appeared in Norman Lear's All That Glitters (1977) and TV movies such as A Matter of Wife... and Death (1975) and It Happened at Lakewood Manor (1977).

The 1980s marked Gillette's transition from Broadway and television into film. Before this transition, she had sizeable television roles as Nancy Baxter on the national run of The Baxters; Dr. W. Emily Hanover, Dr. R. Quincy's (Jack Klugman) second wife on the eighth and final season of Quincy, M.E. (having previously portrayed his deceased first wife Helen Quincy in a flashback); a role on Search for Tomorrow at the end of that series' long run; and the David Chase series Almost Grown (1988–1989).

After the end of Search for Tomorrow in late 1986, and appearing with Robert Reed and Bert Convy on Super Password, Gillette made the transition to film with a variety of notable roles such as that of Mona in 1987's Moonstruck. Many of these roles had her as an on-screen mother to characters played by prominent actors; she played Roger Davis' (Jack Black) mother Mrs. Davis in Bob Roberts (1992), Robin Nickerson's (Mary-Louise Parker) mother Elaine Nickerson in Boys on the Side (1995), Jack Corcoran's (Bill Murray) mother Mrs. Corcoran in Larger than Life (1996), Renee Fitzpatrick's (Jennifer Aniston) mother Carol in She's The One (1996), and Mrs. McGee, the mother of Randy's (Bobby Cannavale) love interest Rusty McGee (Dash Mihok) in The Guru (2002). Her return to television in 2000's short-lived Normal, Ohio had her playing Joan Gamble, the mother of John Goodman's character William "Butch" Gamble.

In the 1990s, Gillette starred in two Hallmark Hall of Fame movies: The Summer of Ben Tyler (1996) with James Woods and A Christmas Memory (1997) with Patty Duke. In 2004, Gillette appeared as Miss Mitzi, the lonely, alcoholic owner of a struggling dance studio in Shall We Dance?. She made several appearances as Grandma Betty on The War at Home (2005–2007); as Lily Flynn, the mother of criminalist Catherine Willows (Marg Helgenberger), in four episodes of CSI (2005–2007/2012); and Margaret Lemon, the mother of Liz Lemon (Tina Fey) in two episodes of 30 Rock (2007/2010). She starred in the 2006 film Hiding Victoria.

Since 2010, she has had several guest-starring roles in Law & Order: Special Victims Unit (2010), Shake it Up (2012), Modern Family (2013), Blue Bloods (2013), Elementary (2015), Public Morals (2015) and Chicago Med (2016). She played Rose Fitzgerald in the 2012 film The Fitzgerald Family Christmas, directed by Edward Burns.

=== Theatre ===
She made her Broadway debut in Gypsy in 1959. Additional Broadway credits include Carnival!, All American, Mr. President, Kelly, Jimmy, Guys and Dolls, Don't Drink the Water, Cabaret, They're Playing Our Song, Brighton Beach Memoirs, and Chapter Two, for which she was nominated for the Tony Award for Best Actress in a Play at the 32nd Tony Awards in 1978. She received a 1960 Theatre World Award for her performance in Russell Patterson's Sketchbook. On February 17, 2020, Gillette was bestowed Honorary Member of The Lambs, America's oldest professional theatrical association.

In 2012, she was nominated for the Lucille Lortel Award for Outstanding Featured Actress in a Play for her performance in Dan LeFranc's Of-Broadway play The Big Meal.

== Filmography ==
=== Film ===
Year	Title	Role	Notes
1987	Moonstruck	Mona	
1988	Bum Rap	Drunk woman	
1991	Undertow	Marlene	
1992	Bob Roberts	Mrs. Davis	
1995	Boys on the Side	Elaine Nickerson	
1996	Larger than Life	Mrs. Corcoran	
1996	She's the One	Carol	
1998	Charlie Hoboken	Stepmother	
2001	Dinner and a Movie	Heddie	
2001	Early Bird Special	Betty	
2002	The Guru	Mrs. McGee	
2004	Shall We Dance?	Miss Mitzi	
2005	The Great New Wonderful	Lainie	
2006	The Last Adam	Betty Adams	
2006	Hiding Victoria	Althea Jaffery	
2012	The Fitzgerald Family Christmas	Rosie Fitzgerald	

=== Television ===
Year	Title	Role	Notes
1956	The Edge of Night	Franki	
1961	Route 66	Nancy	Episode: "The Thin White Line"
1963	The Ed Sullivan Show	Singer	1 episode
1968	Pinocchio	Blue Fairy	Television film
1970	George M!	Ethel Levey	Television film
1971–1974	Love, American Style	Pat O'Brien	4 episodes
1972	Me and the Chimp	Liz Reynolds	13 episodes
1973	Bob & Carol & Ted & Alice	Alice Henderson	12 episodes
1975	A Matter of Wife... and Death	Helen Baker	Television film
1977	All That Glitters	Nancy Langston	2 episodes
1977	It Happened at Lakewood Manor	Peggy Kenter	Television film
1979	Trapper John, M.D.	Teresa Duvall	Episode: "Taxi in the Rain"
1979–1983	Quincy, M.E.	Dr. Emily Hanover / Helen Quincy	17 episodes
1980	Marathon	Anita	Television film
1982	Another World	Loretta Shea	Episode #1.4498
1985	Brass	Sister Mary Elizabeth	Television film
1986	St. Elsewhere	Maureen Westphall	Episode: "Time Heals: Part 1"
1986	Search for Tomorrow	Wilma Holliday	Episode: "Finale"
1986	You Again?	Sue	Episode: "Henry the Kissinger"
1987	Brothers	Flo Waters	Episode: "Love and Learn"
1988–1989	Almost Grown	Vi Long	13 episodes
1992	All My Children	Dee Dee Dunstin	3 episodes
1994	Mad About You	Claire Wicker	Episode: "When I'm Sixty-Four"
1996	Law & Order	Cookie Costello	Episode: "Remand"
1996	ABC Afterschool Special	Aunt Rita	Episode: "Through Thick & Thin"
1996	The Summer of Ben Tyler	Suellen	Television film
1996	Jules	Herky	Television film
1997	A Christmas Memory	Callie	Television film
2000	Frasier	Mrs. Wojadubakowski	Episode: "Whine Club"
2000	Sex and the City	Mrs. Adams	Episode: "Hot Child in the City"
2000	Normal, Ohio	Joan Gamble	12 episodes
2001	Law & Order: Criminal Intent	Loretta Marlon	Episode: "Poison"
2003	Queens Supreme	Mrs. DeSipio	Episode: "Case by Case"
2005–2007	The War at Home	Betty	5 episodes
2005–2010	CSI: Crime Scene Investigation	Lily Flynn	4 episodes
2007	Women's Murder Club	Winnie Spencer	Episode: "Grannies, Guns and Love Mints"
2007, 2010	30 Rock	Margaret Lemon	2 episodes
2009	Cold Case	Grace Stearns '09	Episode: "The Crossing"
2010	Law & Order: Special Victims Unit	Judge Sheila Tripler	2 episodes
2012	Shake It Up	Edie Wilde	Episode: "Rock and Roll It Up"
2013	Modern Family	Annie	Episode: "Goodnight Gracie"
2013	Blue Bloods	Colleen McGuire	Episode: "Bad Blood"
2015	Elementary	Claire Renziger	Episode: "A Stitch in Time"
2015	Public Morals	Eileen	2 episodes
2016	Chicago Med	Ruth	Episode: "Extreme Measures"
2018–2019	After Forever	Frannie	7 episodes
