= Millers in Marriage =

2024 film by Edward Burns

- Theatrical release poster
- Directed by: Edward Burns
- Written by: Edward Burns
- Produced by: Ellen H. Schwartz; Aaron Lubin; Edward Burns
- Starring: Morena Baccarin; Benjamin Bratt; Edward Burns; Brian d'Arcy James; Minnie Driver; Julianna Margulies; Gretchen Mol; Campbell Scott; Patrick Wilson
- Cinematography: William Rexer
- Edited by: Janet Gaynor
- Music by: Andrea Vanzo
- Production company: Marlboro Road Gang Productions
- Distributed by: Republic Pictures
- Release dates: September 6, 2024 (TIFF); February 21, 2025 (United States)
- Running time: 117 minutes
- Country: United States
- Language: English

Millers in Marriage is a 2024 American family drama film written and directed by Edward Burns starring Gretchen Mol, Julianna Margulies, and Burns as three siblings navigating challenges to their respective love lives. The film premiered as a Special Presentation at the Toronto International Film Festival on September 6, 2024, and it was released in the United States on February 21, 2025.

== Premise ==
Former indie musician Eve Miller takes a romantic interest in a music journalist as an escape from her unhealthy marriage. Maggie, Eve's sister, must contend with shifting marital dynamics as her writing career begins to surpass that of her husband. Fashion executive Renee begins a relationship with the third Miller sibling, Andy, despite him recently divorcing her former colleague.

== Cast ==
- Gretchen Mol as Eve Miller, a former indie singer-songwriter
- Julianna Margulies as Maggie, a writer
- Minnie Driver as Renee, a fashion executive
- Edward Burns as Andy Miller, an artist who enters a relationship with Renee
- Morena Baccarin as Tina, Andy's ex-wife and a former colleague of Renee
- Benjamin Bratt as Johnny, a music journalist
- Patrick Wilson as Scott, Eve’s husband, a music manager who struggles with alcoholism
- Campbell Scott as Nick, a struggling writer married to Maggie
- Brian d’Arcy James as Dennis, a caretaker

== Production ==
Filming took place during the spring of 2024 across various cities in New Jersey, with scenes shot in Morristown, Hoboken, and Union City.

== Release ==
In May 2024, Millers in Marriage was acquired for worldwide distribution by Republic Pictures, a subsidiary of Paramount Global. The film premiered on September 6, 2024 in the Special Presentations section of that year's Toronto International Film Festival. The film was released in the United States on February 21, 2025.

== Reception ==
On the review aggregator website Rotten Tomatoes, 53% of 43 critics' reviews are positive. Metacritic, which uses a weighted average, assigned the film a score of 49 out of 100, based on 8 critics, indicating "mixed or average" reviews.
