= Finnegan's Foursome =

American sports drama film

- Release poster
- Directed by: Edward Burns
- Screenplay by: Edward Burns
- Produced by: Aaron Lubin; Ellen H. Schwartz
- Starring: Edward Burns; Brian d'Arcy James; Erica Hernández; Brian Muller
- Cinematography: Jeff Muhlstock
- Edited by: Janet Gaynor
- Production companies: Wild Atlantic Pictures; Marlboro Road Gang Productions
- Distributed by: Republic Pictures
- Release dates: June 7, 2026 (Tribeca Festival); June 19, 2026 (United States)
- Running time: 121 minutes
- Country: United States
- Language: English

Finnegan's Foursome is a 2026 American sports comedy film written and directed by Edward Burns, who also stars in the film.

== Premise ==
Two middle-aged brothers embark on a golfing holiday in Ireland with their sons.

== Cast ==
- Edward Burns
- Brian d'Arcy James
- Erica Hernández
- Brian Muller

== Production ==
The film is produced by Wild Atlantic Pictures and Marlboro Road Gang Productions. It is written and directed by Edward Burns. Principal photography took place in Dublin and County Wicklow in the Republic of Ireland in July and August 2024.

Filming locations included Belmullet's Carne Golf Links in County Mayo. Whilst scouting filming locations earlier that year, Burns was quoted as calling the course "the most glorious in Ireland".

Speaking to Collider in September 2024, Burns confirmed that principal photography had ended. The cast includes Burns, Brian d'Arcy James, Brian Muller and Erica Hernández.

== Release ==
Finnegan's Foursome premiered at the Tribeca Festival on June 7, 2026, and was released in the United States on digital on June 19, by Republic Pictures.

== Reception ==
On the review aggregator website Rotten Tomatoes, 50% of 24 critics' reviews are positive, with an average rating of 5.3/10. Metacritic, which uses a weighted average, assigned the film a score of 47 out of 100, based on 5 critics, indicating "mixed or average" reviews.
