= David Spielberg =

American actor (1939–2016)

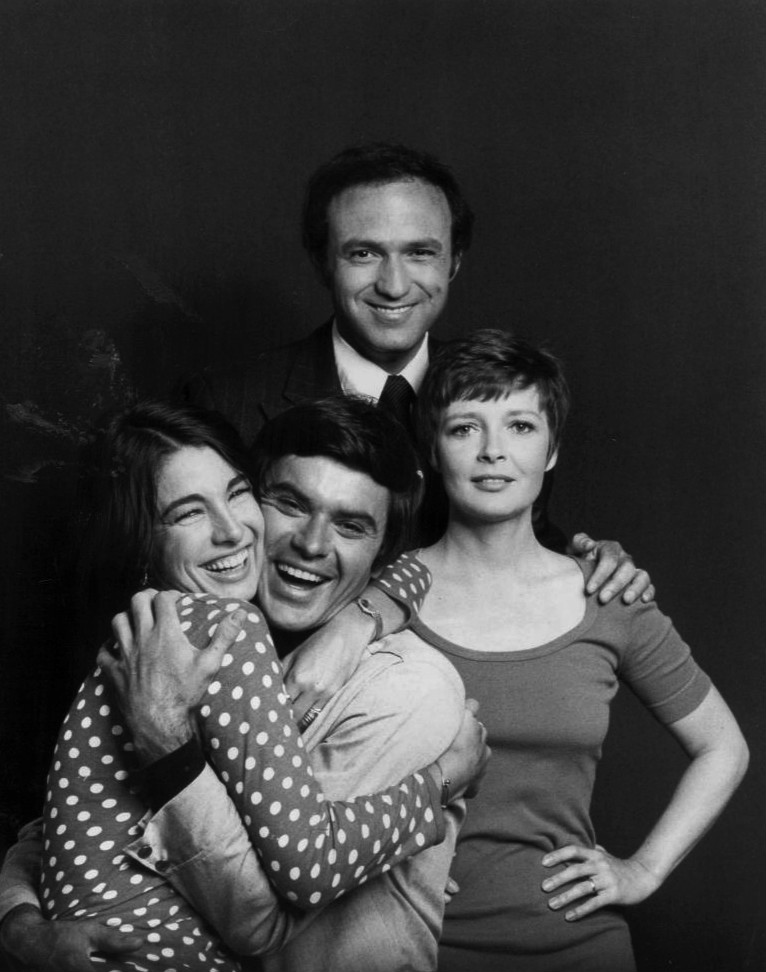
- Cast of 1973 TV series Bob & Carol & Ted & Alice, L-R: Anne Archer, Robert Urich, David Spielberg, Anita Gillette
- Born: March 6, 1939; Weslaco, Texas, U.S.
- Died: June 1, 2016 (aged 77); Los Angeles, California, U.S.
- Education: University of Texas System
- Occupation: Actor
- Years active: 1968–2007

David Spielberg (March 6, 1939 – June 1, 2016) was an American television and film actor.

== Early life ==
Spielberg was born on March 6, 1939, in Weslaco, Texas, and was a resident of Mercedes, Texas. His father was a Romanian-Jewish immigrant, and his mother was a Mexican-American teacher. After serving in the United States Navy for two years, he enrolled in the University of Texas. Two summers' acting experience in New York City led him to drop out of the university and move to New York to pursue a career in acting.

== Career ==
=== Film ===
Spielberg's screen debut was in The Effect of Gamma Rays on Man-in-the-Moon Marigolds (1972). He also appeared in Newman's Law (1974), Law and Disorder (1974), Hustle (1975), Prime Time a.k.a. American Raspberry (1977), The Choirboys (1977), Real Life (1979), Winter Kills (1979), Christine (1983), The Stranger (1987), Alice (1990), and Red Ribbon Blues (1996).

=== Television ===
Spielberg's roles in television programs included those shown in the table below.

Program	Character
The American Girls	Francis X. Casey
Magnum, P.I.	Dan Morgan/ Inspector Vittorio Mono
Bob & Carol & Ted & Alice	Ted Henderson
From Here to Eternity	Lieutenant David Ross
Jessica Novak	Max Kenyon
Falcon Crest	Ned Vogel
The Practice	David Bedford
Star Trek: The Next Generation, "Starship Mine"	Cmdr. Calvin Hutchinson

He also appeared in Wiseguy, The Rockford Files, Law & Order, Highway to Heaven, Family Ties, Wheels, L.A. Law, ER, A Place for Annie, Hart to Hart, and One Day at a Time, among other television series.

== Death ==
Spielberg died of cancer in Los Angeles, California, on June 1, 2016. He was 77.

== Filmography ==
Year	Title	Role	Notes
1972	The Trial of the Catonsville Nine	Defense Attorney	
1972	The Effect of Gamma Rays on Man-in-the-Moon Marigolds	Mr. Goodman	
1974	Newman's Law	Hinney	
1974	Law and Disorder	Bobby	
1975	Hustle	Jerry Bellamy	
1977	The Choirboys	Finque	
1977	Prime Time a.k.a. American Raspberry	Mr. Dorset	
1977	In the Matter of Karen Ann Quinlan	Dr. Mason	
1979	Real Life	Dr. Jeremy Nolan	
1979	Winter Kills	Miles Garner	
1980	The Hunter	Sgt. Werblo	Uncredited
1983	Christine	Mr. Casey	
1985	War and Love	Aron	
1987	The Stranger	Hobby	
1990	Alice	Ken	
1991	Us	Paul Kramer	
1992	Nervous Ticks	Mr. Reynolds	
1996	Red Ribbon Blues	Yorkin	
2002	Hokum County Homicide	Carl	
2003	Final Draft	Shmuel	
2007	Flight of the Living Dead	Dr. Conroy	(final film role)
