= Newlyweds (film) =

- Film poster
- Directed by: Edward Burns
- Written by: Edward Burns
- Produced by: Edward Burns; Aaron Lubin; William Rexer
- Starring: Edward Burns; Caitlin FitzGerald; Kerry Bishé; Max Baker; Marsha Dietlein Bennett; Dara Coleman
- Cinematography: William Rexer
- Edited by: Janet Gaynor
- Music by: PT Walkley
- Production company: Marlboro Road Gang Productions
- Distributed by: Tribeca Film
- Release dates: November 4, 2011 (Amsterdam Film Week); January 13, 2012 (United States)
- Running time: 95 minutes
- Country: United States
- Language: English
- Budget: $9,000
- Box office: $5,000

Newlyweds is a 2011 American comedy drama film written by, directed by, and starring Edward Burns, with Caitlin FitzGerald, Kerry Bishé, and Marsha Dietlein Bennett. Newlyweds was selected to close the 2011 Tribeca Film Festival.

== Plot ==
The honeymoon period ends quickly for Buzzy and Katie when Buzzy's sister Linda arrives unannounced to the couples' apartment looking for a place to stay. Linda's arrival complicates Buzzy and Katie's marriage and forces both to re-evaluate their relationship. Linda has particularly come to New York to try to win back her ex-boyfriend, Miles. He originally proposed to her, but she refused. Linda pursues Miles, coerces him into meeting her for a drink. She asks him to leave his current wife and run away with her. Miles reveals his wife is now pregnant. Devastated, Linda goes off with the most random guy named Whitney at the bar. First to Buzzy and Katie's place, but Buzzy chases them both out with a baseball bat. Linda and Whitney then go back to his place. Linda steals Katie's coat and leaves it at Whitney's place. She sneaks out of Whitney's apartment early in the morning. Buzzy confesses what the two were doing.

Linda calls her ex-boyfriend back again, still looking to win him back. When Katie's ex-husband Dara returns with a borrowed vacuum cleaner, Linda totally throws herself into him. She spends the night with him as well. Buzzy sees them together and demands they break up. Buzzy hesitates to tell Katie the news. Meanwhile, Katie's own sister is staying over and Linda flees before either Katie or Marsha finds out that she was with Dara. At one point, where it seems Max is flirting with an employee at the recording studio, Marsha is furious and confronts him about it. Max has grown tired of his marriage to Marsha and wants a divorce. He drops the news over dinner at their usual spot. Max continuously tells his marital and other domestic problems to Buzzy, who just wants to train him at the gym and does not want to hear about his personal life. Buzzy finally refuses to train Max anymore, as he has made no physical improvement whatsoever. Linda dates both Miles and Dara, but she is still pining for Miles. She does have an affair with him. But he ends it. Linda has Dara for a one-night stand.

Buzzy finally drops the bomb that Linda was seeing Dara and both Katie and Marsha are livid. They both blame Buzzy for this. After all that has happened, Katie tells Buzzy she is worried that she has no idea who he really is and they got married too quickly. Katie fears that they will wind up just like Max and Marsha. Katie wants Marsha to leave, but Marsha will not. Buzzy takes Linda to the diner and gives her a considerable amount of money and advice on how to get her life together. Buzzy packs a bag and invites Katie to join him in the car. Finally, she gets in the car with Buzzy as he tells her, "We need to get as far away from our relatives as possible". They drive off.

== Cast ==
- Edward Burns as Buzzy
- Kerry Bishé as Linda
- Marsha Dietlein as Marsha
- Caitlin FitzGerald as Katie
- Max Baker as Max
- Dara Coleman as Dara
- Johnny Solo as Miles

== Production ==
Newlyweds was shot in a faux-documentary style on location in Tribeca, New York City. The movie cost $9,000 to produce and was filmed entirely on a Canon 5D. It is the smallest budget Burns has ever made a movie for.

=== Soundtrack ===
The score is composed by PT Walkley.

== Reception ==
The film received generally positive reviews; it holds a 73% positive rating on Rotten Tomatoes based on 11 reviews, with an average score of 6.58/10. Roger Ebert awarded the film 2 stars out of 4, writing, "This is an honorable film, and Kerry Bishe’s performance in particular is winning. But it plays more like a rehearsal than an opening night."
