= Ash Wednesday (2002 film) =

2002 film by Edward Burns

- Film poster
- Directed by: Edward Burns
- Written by: Edward Burns
- Produced by: Edward Burns; Margot Bridger
- Starring: Edward Burns; Elijah Wood; Rosario Dawson; Oliver Platt
- Cinematography: Russell Lee Fine
- Edited by: David Greenwald
- Music by: David Shire
- Production company: Malboro Road Gang Productions
- Distributed by: Focus Features; IFC Productions
- Release dates: May 11, 2002 (Tribeca); October 11, 2002
- Running time: 99 minutes
- Country: United States
- Languages: English; Spanish
- Box office: $2,942

Ash Wednesday is a 2002 American crime drama film written and directed by Edward Burns. It stars Burns alongside Elijah Wood and Rosario Dawson. The film is set in the early 1980s in New York City's Hell's Kitchen neighborhood and tells the story of a pair of Irish-American brothers who become embroiled in a conflict with the Irish mob.

== Plot ==
In Hell's Kitchen on Ash Wednesday in 1983, rumors are spreading that Francis Sullivan's (Edward Burns) younger brother Sean (Elijah Wood), who has been presumed dead for three years, has reappeared. However, when it seems that Sean's life might be in danger again, Francis helps to get Sean and his wife Grace (Rosario Dawson) out of the city while avoiding a war between rival factions. However, Francis stays back to stop Moran (Oliver Platt). The film closes with Francis wiping the cross of ashes from his forehead before stepping outside the pub and being killed by a gunshot.

== Cast ==
- Edward Burns as Francis "Fran" Sullivan
- Elijah Wood as Sean Sullivan
- Rosario Dawson as Grace Quinonez
- Oliver Platt as Moran
- James Handy as Father Mahoney
- Brian Burns as Mike Moran, Moran's Cousin
- Vincent Rubino as Vinny Boombata
- James Cummings as J.C. Moran, Moran's Brother
- Pat McNamara as "Murph" Murphy
- John DiResta as Pete
- Malachy McCourt as "Whitey" Smith
- Peter Gerety as Uncle Handy
- Brian Delate as George "Crazy George" Cullen
- Jimmy Burke as "Red" Kelly
- Teresa Yenque as Mrs. Diaz
- Julie Hale as Maggie Shea
- Kathleen Doyle as Mrs. Flanagan
- Marina Durell as Mrs. Quinonez
- Michael Mulhern as Detective Pulaski
- Michael Leydon Campbell as Jimmy Burke
- Dara Coleman as John Coleman
- Penny Balfour as Callie
- Kevin Kash as Paulie "Numbers"
- Gregg Bello as Larossa, Vinny's Brother
- Joe Lisi as Charlie, The Wiseguy
- Jack DeFuria as Sean "Little Sean" Sullivan Jr.

== Critical reception and box office ==
The film holds a 25% "rotten" rating on the website Rotten Tomatoes based on an aggregate score of 16 reviews. On Metacritic, the film holds a score of 40 out of 100 based on 7 critics, indicating mixed or average reviews. The film was released in two theaters and grossed less than $3,000.
