= Wildwood Enterprises, Inc =

American film production company

Wildwood Enterprises, Inc & South Fork Pictures
- Industry: Motion pictures, Entertainment
- Founded: 1970s; 55 years ago
- Founder: Robert Redford
- Defunct: 2018
- Headquarters: Provo, Utah, United States
- Products: Film TV films

Wildwood Enterprises, Inc., is an American film and television production company. It was founded by actor and director Robert Redford. It is sometimes credited as South Fork Pictures. In 1987, the company had partnered with Cineplex Odeon Films to launch a feature film subsidiary Northfolk Productions, which spent the next five years making five films, all with a budget of between $4 and 5 million.

== Sundance Film Festival ==
Robert Redford was also founder of the Sundance Film Festival, which takes places annually in January in Utah.

== Sundance Productions ==
Redford was the President and co-Founder of Sundance Productions, with Laura Michalchyshyn.

Most recently, Sundance Productions produced Chicagoland (CNN), Cathedrals of Culture (Berlin Film Festival), The March (PBS) and Emmy Nominee All The President’s Men Revisited (Discovery), Isabella Rossellini’s Green Porno Live! and To Russia with Love on Epix.

== Producer ==
Year	Title	Notes
1975	Three Days of the Condor	Co-Producer
1976	All the President's Men	
1987	Promised Land	Executive producer
1988	Some Girls	Executive producer
1991	The Dark Wind	Executive producer
1994	Quiz Show	Executive producer
1996	She's the One	Executive producer
1998	No Looking Back	Executive producer
1998	Central Station	
1998	Slums of Beverly Hills	Executive producer
1998	A Civil Action	
2002	How to Kill Your Neighbor's Dog	Executive producer
2002	Love in the Time of Money	Executive producer
2002	People I Know	Executive producer
2002	Skinwalkers	TV movie; executive producer
2004	The Motorcycle Diaries	Executive producer
2012	The Company You Keep	Producer
2013	The March	Documentary, Executive producer
2014	Drunktown's Finest	Executive producer
2015	The Adderall Diaries	Executive producer
2017	Our Souls at Night	Producer
2018	The Old Man and the Gun	Executive producer
