= Dock Walloper =

Dock Walloper #1 Art by Siju Thomas

Dock Walloper is a current comic book series from film star Edward Burns and Virgin Comics.

== Credits ==
Dock Walloper was created by Edward Burns and is written by Burns and Jimmy Palmiotti, with art and color by Siju Thomas.

== Synopsis ==
Dock Walloper is the story that takes place in the roaring 20's of New York City. America's great metropolis has become the nexus of high society culture, cutting edge industry and perhaps the most shocking crime wave in our country's history. Known for its sinister and treacherous underworld, there's a new power waking up the city that never sleeps. Its name... John "The Hand" Smith.

The Nickname is a given. An outcast and an orphan, Smith's massive right hand is nearly twice as large as his left, and when push comes to shove, you'd pity anyone who gets in his way. Smith's only friends in the world are a fellow orphan and low-rent black gangster nicknamed Bootsy, and an Asian femme fatale known as Ring-a-Ling. In a world of crime, passion, and a touch of the fantastic, they will attempt to change organized crime or die trying.

== Publication history ==
Dock Walloper was first published in November 2007 by Virgin Comics and consists of a five-issue series. The series was later compiled into a trade paperback in 2008.

== See also ==
- Indian comics
- 1920s
