= Bob & Carol & Ted & Alice (TV series) =

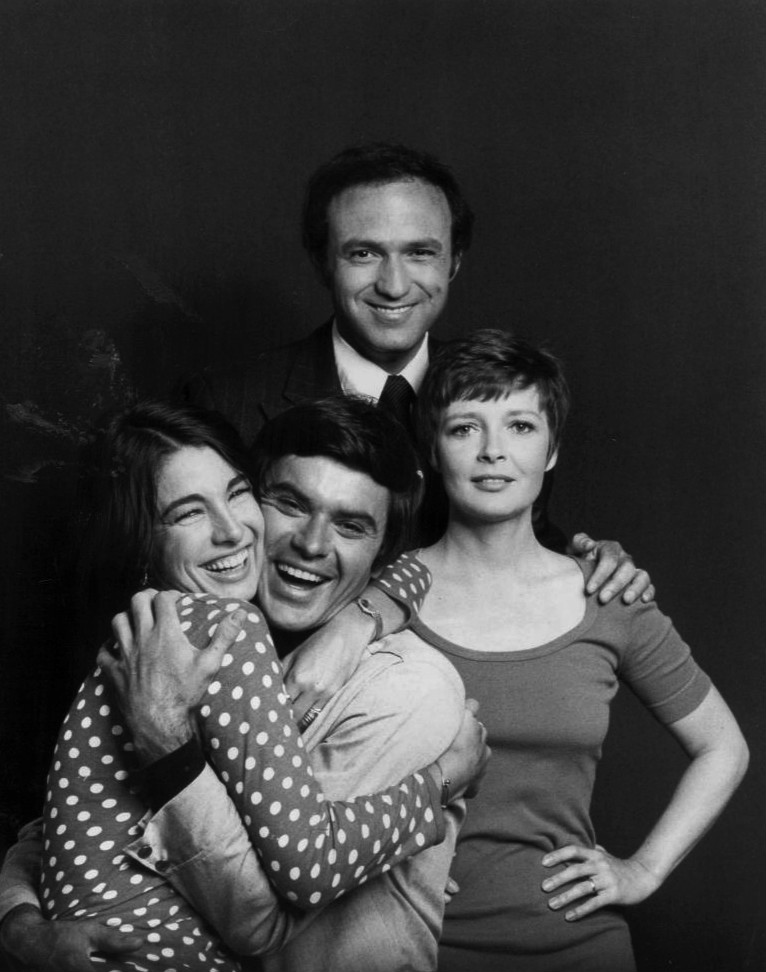
- Main cast photo
- Genre: Sitcom
- Based on: Bob & Carol & Ted & Alice by Paul Mazursky & Larry Tucker
- Developed by: Larry Rosen
- Written by: James S. Henerson; Bernard M. Kahn
- Directed by: Rick Edelstein; Leo Penn
- Starring: Robert Urich; Anne Archer; David Spielberg; Anita Gillette
- Composer: Artie Butler
- Country of origin: United States
- Original language: English
- No. of seasons: 1
- No. of episodes: 12 (5 unaired)

Production
- Producer: James S. Henerson
- Running time: 30 minutes
- Production companies: Frankovich Enterprises; Screen Gems

Original release
- Network: ABC
- Release: September 26 – November 7, 1973

Related
- Bob & Carol & Ted & Alice

Bob & Carol & Ted & Alice is an American sitcom broadcast in the United States by ABC as part of its 1973 fall lineup. It was based on the 1969 movie of the same title, and produced by Frankovich Enterprises in association with Screen Gems. Only seven episodes were aired before the series was canceled.

Bob & Carol & Ted & Alice was of necessity somewhat different from the R-rated movie upon which it was based. The film involved sexual liberation, and featured the (short-lived) desire of the two title couples to engage in extramarital affairs, mate-swapping and group sex, all of which would have been unacceptable on U.S. broadcast television in 1973 under the network's Division of Standards and Practices. However, the TV series depicted skinny dipping, premarital sex, and unmarried couples cohabiting, which were still thought by many to be racy topics for network television at the time. As with the film, Ted and Alice Henderson were more conservative than the "liberated" Bob and Carol Sanders. No members of the original film cast reprised their roles in the series.

== Reception ==
Scheduled opposite CBS's Top 10 hit The Sonny & Cher Comedy Hour and NBC's Top 30 hit Adam-12, the series earned very low Nielsen ratings, and was canceled less than two months after its premiere.

The show is perhaps best remembered for featuring a then eleven-year-old Jodie Foster as Ted and Alice's daughter. (This differed from the movie version where the characters had a son.)

== Cast ==
- Robert Urich as Bob Sanders
- Anne Archer as Carol Sanders
- David Spielberg as Ted Henderson
- Anita Gillette as Alice Henderson
- Brad Savage as Sean Sanders
- Jodie Foster as Elizabeth Henderson

== Episodes ==
No.	Title	Directed by	Written by	Original release date
1	"Can I Help It If She's Crazy About Me?"	Rick Edelstein	David Lloyd	September 26, 1973
2	"Alice's Wild Oat"	Rick Edelstein	Bernie Kahn	October 3, 1973
3	"Bob & Carol & Ted & Alice"	Leo Penn	Larry Tucker	October 10, 1973
4	"I'm Not Jealous, Only Curious"	Rick Edelstein	James S. Henerson	October 17, 1973
5	"Open Marriage, Closed Mind"	Rick Edelstein	David Lloyd	October 24, 1973
6	"Nobody Wants to Talk About It"	Rick Edelstein	Rick Mittleman	October 31, 1973
7	"The Bare Truth Hurts"	Rick Edelstein	Gene Thompson	November 7, 1973
8	"Such Good Friends"	Rick Edelstein	Karyl Geld	Unaired*
9	"Walk a Mile in My Clogs"	Rick Edelstein	Ron Friedman	Unaired*
10	"Double, Double, Doyle & Trouble"	Rick Edelstein	David Lloyd	Unaired*
11	"Inadmissible Evidence"	Rick Edelstein	George Atkins	Unaired*
12	"My Butcher Is a Thief"	Rick Edelstein	Michael Weinberger & James Ritz	Unaired*

*These episodes finally appeared on USA Network, with the rest of the series, in 1984.
