= Sidewalks of New York (2001 film) =

2001 film by Edward Burns

- Original theatrical release poster featuring the World Trade Center towers at the top right. The towers were removed in later posters.
- Directed by: Edward Burns
- Written by: Edward Burns
- Produced by: Margot Bridger; Edward Burns; Cathy Schulman; Rick Yorn
- Starring: Edward Burns; Rosario Dawson; Dennis Farina; Heather Graham; David Krumholtz; Brittany Murphy; Stanley Tucci
- Cinematography: Frank Prinzi
- Edited by: David Greenwald
- Distributed by: Paramount Classics (United States, Canada, Australia, New Zealand and Japan); Buena Vista Film Sales (International)
- Release date: November 21, 2001 (Limited)
- Running time: 108 minutes
- Country: United States
- Language: English
- Budget: $1 million
- Box office: $3.5 million

Sidewalks of New York is a 2001 American comedy-drama film written and directed by Edward Burns, who also stars in the film. The plot follows eight cycles in the lives of six Manhattan residents whose inter-connections form a circle that places each of them less than the proverbial six degrees of separation from the others.

== Plot ==
The circle begins with Tommy Reilly, a onetime wannabe writer who became the producer of a weekly television entertainment news show by design rather than choice, and has stayed with it for the money rather than any professional satisfaction. Dumped by his live-in girlfriend without warning, he temporarily moves in with colleague Carpo, an aging Lothario ready to offer unlimited — and sometimes useless — romantic advice.

At a video store, Tommy meets grammar school teacher Maria Tedesko. The two flirt, meet for coffee and begin to date. Maria, recently divorced, finds it difficult to commit to a new relationship and stops taking Tommy's calls. When she discovers she's pregnant, she attempts to reconnect with him, but at the last moment opts to lie and tell him she's leaving town and chooses to raise the child on her own.

Maria's ex-husband, who longs to reconcile with her, is Benjamin Bazler, an apartment house doorman and aspiring songwriter whose obsession is 1960s/1970s rock music. He shares his dream of becoming a full-time musician with Iowa transplant Ashley, an NYU student working as a coffee shop waitress to support herself.

Ashley is involved in an affair with considerably older married dentist Griffin Ritso. Although he professes to love his mistress, the once divorced Griffin shies away from leaving his wife Annie Matthews for fear of being a two-time loser at matrimony. Eventually, Griffin's inability to commit to their relationship causes Ashley to dump him and reject his advances to get her back as she becomes involved in a relationship with Benjamin.

Real estate broker Annie is unhappy with her marriage but too moral to consider having an affair. She finds herself confiding in and flirting with one of her house-hunting clients — Tommy Reilly. Thus the circle is complete. She finally leaves Griffin.

The narrative segments are intermingled with documentary-like interviews in which of the characters address the camera with their thoughts about sex, love, and relationships.

== Cast ==
- Edward Burns as Tommy Reilly
- Rosario Dawson as Maria Tedesko
- David Krumholtz as Benjamin Bazler
- Brittany Murphy as Ashley
- Stanley Tucci as Griffin Ritso
- Heather Graham as Annie Matthews
- Dennis Farina as Carpo

== Production notes ==
Burns wrote the script while on the set of Saving Private Ryan. Filming began on February 23, 2000, and wrapped on March 16.

In an episode of the Sundance Channel series Anatomy of a Scene that focused on the film, Burns revealed he shot the film in only seventeen days, working with a budget of $1 million. Many of the locations used were within the same neighborhood in order to facilitate a quick move from one to the other. Dennis Farina's scenes were shot in one day; he had agreed to the low budget production after meeting Burns on the set of Saving Private Ryan. Tucci and Graham both shot their scenes in under a week.

The film premiered at the Toronto International Film Festival on September 8, 2001. Following the terrorist attacks three days later, Paramount Classics, who had reportedly spent $2 million on the domestic distribution rights, withheld its release until late November. Although the World Trade Center looms behind Tommy during his interviews, the image of the twin towers in the original promotional poster was later deleted.

== Release ==
The film played on 224 screens and grossed $2,402,459 in the United States. The international box office accounted for another $1.1 million.

== Reception ==
On the review aggregator website Rotten Tomatoes the film holds an approval rating of 56% based on 94 reviews with an average rating of 5.50/10. The website's critics consensus reads: "Though well-acted, Sidewalks of New York generally comes off as a second-rate Woody Allen film. The characters seem self-absorbed, the problems trite." Metacritic gave the film a weighted average score of 49 out of 100, based on 29 critics, indicating "mixed or average reviews"

In his review in The New York Times, A.O. Scott said: "Though it fails to be very interesting, Sidewalks of New York, like the people who populate Mr. Burns's New York, is impossible to dislike. If it's not especially funny, it is appealingly good-humored, and the actors perform well within the limitations of the script ... [Burns] deserves credit for avoiding the sudsy happily-ever-after clichés that deform so many contemporary romantic comedies. The view of love that emerges from Sidewalks, while it is not particularly deep or insightful, is refreshingly hard-headed without being altogether cynical."

Roger Ebert of the Chicago Sun-Times observed: "The movie lives at the intersection between Woody Allen and Sex and the City...[It] is funny without being hilarious, touching but not tearful, and articulate in the way that Burns is articulate, by nibbling earnestly around an idea as if afraid that the core has seeds."

In Variety, Scott Foundas called the film "not just instantly forgettable, but beginning to fade from memory even as its images still play across the screen" and one "seized by fitful bouts of hilarity and charm," a picture whose "overall impression is one of overindulgence and underimagination - a sponge cake without the yeast."

Mick LaSalle of the San Francisco Chronicle said: "In the world of this picture, just about everything people do with their clothes on is a sham, or at best some lame diversion between the spasms of real life that take place only in a bedroom. This may be the way very young adults think, but as a presentation of grown-ups, Sidewalks of New York is just weird. It's also, scene by scene, well acted and well written. Burns writes clever dialogue, and he knows how to work with actors."

In USA Today, Mike Clark rated the film two out of a possible four stars, and commented: "Any goodwill the performers build up is quickly shot down by the incessant interviews, which restate the obvious when they're not showing how self-delusional some of these characters are. Those who teach public speaking sometimes advocate telling your audience what you're going to tell them, then actually telling them, then telling them what you've told them. Sidewalks reproves this isn't a wise path for movies."
