= The Fitzgerald Family Christmas =

- Theatrical release poster
- Directed by: Edward Burns
- Written by: Edward Burns
- Produced by: Edward Burns; Aaron Lubin; William Rexer
- Starring: Kerry Bishé; Edward Burns; Heather Burns; Marsha Dietlein; Caitlin FitzGerald; Anita Gillette; Tom Guiry; Ed Lauter; Mike McGlone; Noah Emmerich; Connie Britton
- Cinematography: William Rexer
- Edited by: Janet Gaynor
- Music by: PT Walkley
- Distributed by: Tribeca Films
- Release dates: October 24, 2012 (Austin Film Festival); December 7, 2012 (United States)
- Country: United States
- Language: English
- Box office: $50,292

The Fitzgerald Family Christmas is a 2012 comedy-drama film starring Edward Burns and Connie Britton and written, directed, and produced by Burns. It premiered at the 2012 Toronto International Film Festival.

== Premise ==
The seven adult siblings of the Fitzgerald family prepare for their estranged father to return home for Christmas for the first time since he walked out on his family 20 years ago.

== Cast ==
- Edward Burns as Gerry
- Connie Britton as Nora
- Heather Burns as Erin
- Kerry Bishé as Sharon
- Marsha Dietlein as Dottie
- Caitlin FitzGerald as Connie
- Anita Gillette as Rosie
- Tom Guiry as Cyril
- Ed Lauter as Big Jim
- Michael McGlone as Quinn
- Noah Emmerich as Francis "FX" Xavier

== Reception ==
The Fitzgerald Family Christmas received mostly positive reviews from critics, with a 64% rating on Rotten Tomatoes.

Some reviewers praised the film for its authentic portrayal of family dynamics. Peter Travers from Rolling Stone noted its blend of humor and heartache, describing it as "the only good, solid movie to open this weekend," appreciating Burns' return to his Irish-Catholic roots and the depth of familial connections portrayed.

Conversely, other critics, like Rex Reed from the New York Observer, criticized the film for its predictable plot and lack of engaging characters, describing it as a "miserable ordeal." The film was characterized as overly verbose and filled with soap-opera clichés, which detracted from its potential impact. Reed also mentions the extensive cast of characters fails to connect with the audience properly, citing the screenplay as "exhaustingly labored verbosity".

== See also ==
- List of Christmas films
