= She's the One (1996 film) =

1996 comedy-drama film by Edward Burns

- Theatrical release poster
- Directed by: Edward Burns
- Written by: Edward Burns
- Produced by: Edward Burns; Ted Hope; James Schamus
- Starring: Jennifer Aniston; Maxine Bahns; Edward Burns; Cameron Diaz; John Mahoney; Mike McGlone
- Cinematography: Frank Prinzi
- Edited by: Susan Graef
- Music by: Tom Petty and the Heartbreakers
- Production companies: Fox Searchlight Pictures; Good Machine; Marlboro Road Gang Productions; South Fork Pictures
- Distributed by: 20th Century Fox
- Release date: August 23, 1996
- Running time: 96 minutes
- Country: United States
- Language: English
- Budget: $3 million
- Box office: $13.8 million

She's the One is a 1996 American romantic comedy film written and directed by New York actor and director Edward Burns. It stars Burns, Jennifer Aniston, Cameron Diaz, Mike McGlone, Maxine Bahns, and John Mahoney. The film features one of Tom Petty's few movie soundtracks and is named after the Bruce Springsteen song of the same name.

The film was released theatrically on August 23, 1996, to generally positive critical reception, and grossed $13.8 million on a budget of $3 million. Aniston and Diaz earned particular acclaim for their performances.

== Plot ==
Irish American Catholic Mickey Fitzpatrick is a NYC taxi driver, unhappy over his ex-fiancée Heather's infidelity. His brother, Francis, is a Wall Street stock investor married to Renee, though she is frustrated by his lack of desire for sexual relations – not knowing he is having an affair with Heather.

On weekends, Mickey and Francis visit their parents on Long Island. Their father, Frank, is old-school, low-key, and sexist, always telling Mickey and Francis what to do, yet also advising them to always push to succeed.

Driving his cab, Mickey picks up Hope, an NYU art student headed to the airport. Clicking immediately, she asks him to drive her to New Orleans, they fall head over heels and impulsively marry the next day, returning to NYC two days later to tell Francis and Renee. Francis is upset, mostly because he was not asked to be best man.

Mickey moves in with Hope but soon becomes disillusioned with her bohemian lifestyle, including frequent power cuts in their ramshackle apartment. Francis grows concerned that he is being unfair to Heather by continuing to stay with Renee. At the same time, Renee's Italian-American family, mostly her younger sister Molly, suggests the problem with Francis' lack of interest is that he may be gay, so she asks Mickey and Frank to confront him. He denies being gay but admits to being unfaithful.

Francis belittles Mickey for the lack of forward progress in his life with Hope. Francis also argues with Heather about her ongoing sexual relations with a wealthy old man, "Papa". When Mickey picks up Heather as a fare, he goes to her apartment to retrieve his TV. She implies that he wants more than just the TV from her, but he does not reciprocate, chastising her for the infidelity that ended their engagement and for her time as a call girl to pay her way through college. Throughout it all, Frank offers more egotistical advice to them— only to be devastated when he learns, on a fishing trip with his priest, that his religious wife has not been to Mass in months.

On a visit to Heather's, Francis learns about her meeting with Mickey. He shows up at his brother's to ask him if he had sex with her. Later, Mickey discovers she is who Francis is having the affair with. The revelation escalates to an argument at their parents', leading Frank to strap boxing gloves on them, with Mickey winning on the first punch.

Francis finally tells Renee about his affair and files for divorce. When Mickey finds out he intends to marry Heather, he tells Francis Heather had been a prostitute, giving Francis cold feet.

Hope informs Mickey they will need to move to Paris in a month if she is accepted into art school there. Already unsure of leaving New York to join her when meeting Connie, Hope's co-worker at a neighborhood bar, who claims to have had a "special relationship" with Hope before the marriage (strongly implying a lesbian romance). Mickey reacts poorly, leading Hope to say she is unsure if he should come to Paris with her after all.

Due to Francis' sudden indecision over marriage, Heather marries Papa. When he threatens to tell Papa that she was a prostitute, Heather tells him that Papa was "her best customer". He then calls Renee in hopes of getting back together with her, but she is already in a relationship with Scott Sherman, a family acquaintance whom Francis previously called a fatso geek, while Renee had pointed out that he was shy and sweet and nicer than him.

Mickey and Francis meet with Frank at his house, and he tells them their mother just left him for a hardware store owner. She has been sleeping with him when supposedly at church. Frank apologizes to his sons for giving them bad advice about life and love, as his own wife was cheating. The three men go out fishing, aware that despite the failure of their love lives, they will always have each other. As they prepare the motorboat to cast off, Mickey realizes he must try to talk with Hope before she leaves for Paris. Surprised, he learns Frank has arranged a special guest – Hope. She asks to drive the boat, but Frank, who never allowed a woman on his boat before, says it is too soon for that.

== Cast ==
- Edward Burns as Mickey Fitzpatrick
- Mike McGlone as Francis Fitzpatrick
- Cameron Diaz as Heather Davis
- Jennifer Aniston as Renee Fitzpatrick
- Maxine Bahns as Hope
- John Mahoney as Mr. Fitzpatrick
- Leslie Mann as Connie
- Amanda Peet as Molly DeLuca
- Frank Vincent as Ron
- Anita Gillette as Carol DeLuca
- Malachy McCourt as Tom
- Robert Weil as Mr. DeLuca
- Beatrice Winde as Older Woman
- Tom Tammi as Father John
- Raymond De Marco as Doorman
- Ron Farrell as Scott Sherman

== Reception ==
On the review aggregator website Rotten Tomatoes, 63% of 52 critics' reviews are positive, with an average rating of 5.9/10. The website's consensus reads: "A relationship comedy that errs on the side of slick, She's the One is a perfunctory study of machismo from a very male perspective."Metacritic, which uses a weighted average, assigned the film a score of 53 out of 100, based on 26 critics, indicating "mixed or average" reviews.

Critics were, overall, won by the performances of John Mahoney, Jennifer Aniston and Cameron Diaz: Aniston and Mahoney brought a "kind of solid professionalism" according to Janet Maslin and Lisa Schwarzbaum. Chris Hicks said, "Better, however, are Diaz, lending charm to a character who could have been quite unsympathetic, and especially Aniston, whose decent, trusting character is quite appealing. Best of all, however, is John Mahoney, hilarious as the bombastic patriarch of the Fitzpatrick clan, who refers to his sons as 'sisters' and calls them 'Barbara' or 'Dorothy' while offering ill-advised sarcasm in place of fatherly wisdom." For Louise Keller, "Burns, Diaz, Bahns and Aniston inject an energy and charisma of their own, and they're fun to watch." Paul Fischer found that Diaz and Aniston are "both in fine form". Alison Macor said, "As Francis' wife Renee, Aniston provides one of the few bright spots in She's the One. Playing Renee as the wry voice of sanity among the rest of the characters, Aniston shows that she's the one who makes this film somewhat enjoyable."

Critics were less forgiving of Maxine Bahns. Mick LaSalle said about her, "The graduate student, Hope, is played by Maxine Bahns, Burns' real-life girlfriend, who was also his love interest in McMullen. Throw a rock out the window, and it's sure to hit someone with more acting talent than Bahns. She can't say a line without it ringing false and keeps smiling nervously, like a shy person at a party. In a way, it's rather sweet that Burns keeps casting Bahns. But She's the One would have been much improved had Burns given Jennifer Aniston the Bahns role. Instead, Aniston is wasted here as the unloved wife of Mickey's callous brother, Francis (Mike McGlone of McMullen). She looks great, but all she gets to do is whine and smoke, and she all but disappears two-thirds of the way into the film."

=== Awards and nominations ===
Year	Association	Category	Nominee	Results
1996	Deauville American Film Festival	Grand Special Prize award	Edward Burns	Nominated
1997	Golden Raspberry Awards	Worst New Star	Jennifer Aniston	Nominated
1997	Satellite Awards	Best Original Song "Walls"	Tom Petty	Nominated

== Soundtrack ==
Songs and Music from the Motion Picture "She's the One" is the ninth studio album by American rock band Tom Petty and the Heartbreakers, released in August 1996. The album served as the soundtrack for the film.

Songs and Music From the Motion Picture "She's the One" peaked at number 15 on the Billboard 200 albums chart and was certified gold by the RIAA in December 1996. The track "Walls (Circus)" peaked at number 69 on the Billboard Hot 100 and number 6 on the Mainstream Rock Tracks chart. "Climb That Hill" also peaked at number 6 on the Mainstream Rock Tracks chart, while "Change the Locks" peaked at number 20.

== Home media ==
The film was released on VHS on January 14, 1997, on DVD on October 3, 2000, and on Blu-ray on September 18, 2012.
