= Matt Bush (actor) =

American actor (born 1986)

- Born: Matthew Bush; March 22, 1986 (age 40); Philadelphia, Pennsylvania, U.S.
- Education: Rowan University
- Occupations: Actor, voice actor
- Years active: 2005–present
- Children: 1

Matthew Bush (born March 22, 1986) is an American actor, best known for the film Adventureland and his AT&T Rollover Minutes commercials. He starred in the TBS comedy Glory Daze as Eli Feldman, a freshman who rushes the wildest fraternity on a 1980s college campus. He also featured in a 2018 Pizza Hut commercial and played Andy Cogan on The Goldbergs.

== Life and career ==
Bush was born in Philadelphia and raised in Cherry Hill, New Jersey. He is of English and Italian descent. His parents, Linda and Dennis Bush, run a magic act. Bush attended Beck Middle School, Cherry Hill High School East and spent several semesters at Rowan University. He voiced the character of Pete "Petey" Kowalski in the 2006 videogame Bully (known as Canis Canem Edit outside of North America). He was also seen in a number of AT&T commercials as a member of a family arguing over the expiration of rollover minutes.

== Filmography ==
=== Film ===
Year	Title	Role	Notes
2005	One Last Thing...	Ricky	
2009	Adventureland	Tommy Frigo	
2009	Halloween II	Wolfie	
2010	High School	Henry Burke	
2010	Nice Guy Johnny	Johnny Rizzo	
2011	Margaret	Kurt	As Matthew Bush
2012	Piranha 3DD	Barry	
2012	The Kitchen	Stan	
2012	Trouble with the Curve	Danny	
2016	Undrafted	David	
2016	Happy Birthday	Brady	
2017	The Relationtrip	Liam	
2018	Sharon 1.2.3.	Jonah	
2019	Paddleton	Stewart	
2019	Senior Love Triangle	Ignacio	

=== Television ===
Year	Title	Role	Notes
2006	Veronica Mars	Billy Greene	Episode: "Nevermind the Buttocks"
2006	Scrubs	Teenage Boy	Episode: "My Déjà Vu, My Déjà Vu"
2008	Law & Order: Criminal Intent	Eric Nessing	Episode: "Legacy"
2010–11	Glory Daze	Eli Feldman	10 episodes
2012	Hawaii Five-0	Zack Slater	Episode: "Ohuna"
2013	Bad Samaritans	Chester	Episode: "Dog Pound"
2013	Anger Management	Kent	Episode: "Charlie and the Hot Nerd"
2013	NTSF:SD:SUV::	Bertrand	Episode: "Unfrozen Agent Man"
2014–2023	The Goldbergs	Andy Cogan	100 episodes
2024	Hacks	Clive	1 episode

=== Video games ===
Year	Title	Role	Notes
2006	Bully	Pete "Petey" Kowalski	Motion capture and voice
