= Beneath the Blue Suburban Skies =

2019 film by Edward Burns

- Directed by: Edward Burns
- Written by: Edward Burns
- Produced by: Edward Burns; Aaron Lubin; William Rexer
- Starring: Jennifer Ehle; Edward Burns; Brian Wiles; Hannah Dunne
- Cinematography: William Rexer
- Production company: Marlboro Road Gang Productions
- Release dates: September 9, 2019 (TIFF); December 25, 2026 (United States)
- Running time: 105 minutes
- Country: United States
- Language: English

Beneath the Blue Suburban Skies is a 2019 American film directed by Edward Burns. It premiered at the 2019 Toronto International Film Festival. It will be theatrically released in New York on December 25, 2026 and expand into other major cities the following January.

== Cast ==
- Jennifer Ehle as Tina Collins
- Edward Burns as Jim
- Brian Wiles as Frankie
- Hannah Dunne as Debbie
- Wass Stevens
- Donnamarie Recco
- Brian d'Arcy James

== Reception ==
Variety called it "an unassuming slice-of-life family drama in brittle black and white... Burns finds glimmers of hope and humor in the bleak with what feels like his most mature work to date."
