= Mini35 =

35 mm lens depth-of-field adapter

A P+S Technik Mini35 adapter is a depth-of-field adapter for use with 35 mm lenses on a video camera while maintaining identical depth of field and angle of view as the same lens on a 35 mm camera.

The original concept of the adapter was achieved by a German cinematographer. It is manufactured and distributed by the German camera manufacturer P+S Technik.

The first film completed within the United States to solely utilize the Mini35 adapter is The Provoker, written and directed by Phillip Cappe, completed and screened in March 2002.
