= Looking for Kitty =

- Movie poster for Looking for Kitty
- Directed by: Edward Burns
- Written by: Edward Burns
- Produced by: Margot Bridger; Aaron Lubin
- Starring: Edward Burns; David Krumholtz; Chris Parnell; Rachel Dratch; Connie Britton; Kevin Kash
- Cinematography: William Rexer
- Edited by: Sarah Flack
- Music by: Robert Gary; P.T. Walkley
- Distributed by: THINKFilm
- Release dates: May 6, 2004 (Tribeca Film Festival); September 1, 2006 (United States)
- Running time: 77 minutes
- Country: United States
- Language: English
- Budget: $250,000
- Box office: $4,480

Looking for Kitty is a 2004 American film written and directed by Edward Burns, in which he plays a private detective in New York City, hired by David Krumholtz to help track down his run-away wife. It premiered at the Tribeca Film Festival on May 6, 2004. It had a limited theatrical release in September 2006 and was released on DVD the following month, on October 24, 2006.

Saturday Night Live alumni Rachel Dratch and Chris Parnell have small parts, while Burns regulars Connie Britton and Kevin Kash have small roles as Burns' neighbor and building superintendent, respectively.

== Premise ==
A man hires a private detective, Jack, to look for his wife. He insists on coming along.

== Cast ==
- David Krumholz
- Ed Burns
- Connie Britton

== Release ==
Burns later said "the movie got one tiny, tiny distribution offer from THINKFilm" and his lawyer John Slowss advised him "you’re gonna sell the movie for nothing and they’re gonna own it, just so you can satisfy that part of your ego that wants the film to be released theatrically.” Burns said Sloss advised if he released the film straight to DVD Burns could make his money back. Burns said "at the time... my ego wouldn’t allow me to do it. So, we sell the film to THINKFilm, get no money, we’re supposed to have a partnership, and we’ve never seen a red cent from it." This prompted Burns to sell his next film Purple Violets straight to ITunes.

== Critical reaction ==
Critics were generally unimpressed by Looking for Kitty. It has a 39% rating on Rotten Tomatoes, qualifying it as "rotten", and a 43 on Metacritic, indicating "mixed or average" reviews. Elizabeth Weitzman of The New York Daily News wrote that it "offers moments of striking insight amid the inevitable self-indulgence." Noel Murray of The A.V. Club was harsher, writing, "Burns has continued to cram one-dimensional characters into thinly plotted comedy-dramas, hoping to re-impress moviegoers with his aloof leading-man charm and faux-natural, trying-too-hard-to-be-funny dialogue." Michael Atkinson of The Village Voice wrote, "It might be the most maturely conceived role in Burns's films, but the plot around it is flimsy, the visual storytelling simpleminded, and the general ideas for character one-note."
