= The Groomsmen =

- Film poster
- Directed by: Edward Burns
- Written by: Edward Burns
- Produced by: Edward Burns; Philippe Martinez; Aaron Lubin; Margot Bridger
- Starring: Edward Burns; John Leguizamo; Matthew Lillard; Donal Logue; Jay Mohr; Brittany Murphy
- Cinematography: William Rexer II
- Edited by: Jamie Kirkpatrick
- Music by: Robert Gary; Howard Drossin; P.T. Walkley
- Distributed by: Bauer Martinez Entertainment
- Release dates: June 9, 2006 (Waterfront Film Festival); July 14, 2006
- Running time: 93 minutes
- Language: English
- Budget: $3 million

The Groomsmen is a 2006 comedy film written and directed by Edward Burns. It opened in New York City and Los Angeles on July 14, 2006. Filming took place at many locations in the City Island section of the Bronx.

== Plot ==
A groom and his four groomsmen wrestle with issues such as fatherhood, homosexuality, honesty and growing up in the week leading up to his wedding.

Paulie, a self-supporting writer, is making plans for his marriage to Sue, his girlfriend who is in her 5th month of pregnancy. Paulie is strongly advised by his older brother Jimbo to not go through with the wedding. Jimbo, who has trouble keeping a job, is envious of Paulie, partly because his own childless marriage is unraveling.

T.C., who left the neighborhood without explanation eight years earlier, returns for the wedding. Apparently, before leaving, T.C. had stolen a Tom Seaver baseball card from Paulie's cousin Mike. Mike still harbors such resentment over the loss that he immediately starts a fight with T.C. Later, T.C. hesitantly reveals that he abruptly left the neighborhood because he's gay and that he stole Mike's card because, even though they were best friends, he hated him for his constant verbal gay bashing.

The neighborhood bar is owned by Dez, who is married with two children and is the most content and functional member of the gang. He is continually trying to "get the band back together". He has even pushed his own sons into learning the guitar and is seen riding them to become better.

T.C. knocks on the door of his estranged father's house. It's the first time that T.C. has seen his father since he told his father that he is gay and his father reacted negatively to the news. T.C.'s father answers the door and comes outside and father and son tearfully embrace.

== Cast ==
- Edward Burns as Paulie
- Heather Burns as Jules
- John Leguizamo as T.C.
- Matthew Lillard as Dez
- Donal Logue as Jimbo, Paulie's older brother
- Jay Mohr as Mike, Paulie & Jimbo's paternal cousin
- Brittany Murphy as Sue
- Shari Albert as Tina
- Jessica Capshaw as Jen
- Arthur Nascarella as Mr. B
- John O'Donohue as Pops, Mike's father and Paulie & Jimbo's paternal uncle
- Spencer Fox as Jack
- Joseph O'Keefe as Roman Catholic Priest
- Joe Pistone as Topcat
- Kevin Kash as Strip Club MC
- Amy Leonard as Crystal
- Jamie Tirelli as T.C.'s Dad
- John Mahoney as Father of Paulie and Jimbo (cut from film; seen in bonus footage)

== Production ==
Burns' then-girlfriend, supermodel Christy Turlington, was also five months pregnant when they married in June 2003. Turlington inspired Burns to rework the manuscript for this movie, which he hadn't worked on in many months.

== Release ==
The film opened on July 14, 2006, in a limited release of 26 theaters in the US. It grossed less than one million dollars foreign and domestic.

== Reception ==
On review aggregator website Rotten Tomatoes, The Groomsmen has an approval rating of 52% based on 33 reviews. The website's critics consensus reads, "Director and star Burns returns to his home turf -- dialogue-driven examinations of the relationships between men and women -- with uneven results."

In his review for The New York Times, Stephen Holden wrote, "What gives Mr. Burns’s movies their spark is his gut-level empathy for these people, most of whom he understands deeply and relies on for inspiration", but noted that with this film, Burns "is unable (or perhaps afraid) to contrive a story to match his attunement to place and personality. You tolerate the false sentimentality and his characters’ one-dimensional troubles the way you tolerate the conventions of a sitcom." Holden also opined that Leguizamo's character felt underwritten.
