= Edward Burns =

American actor and filmmaker (born 1968)

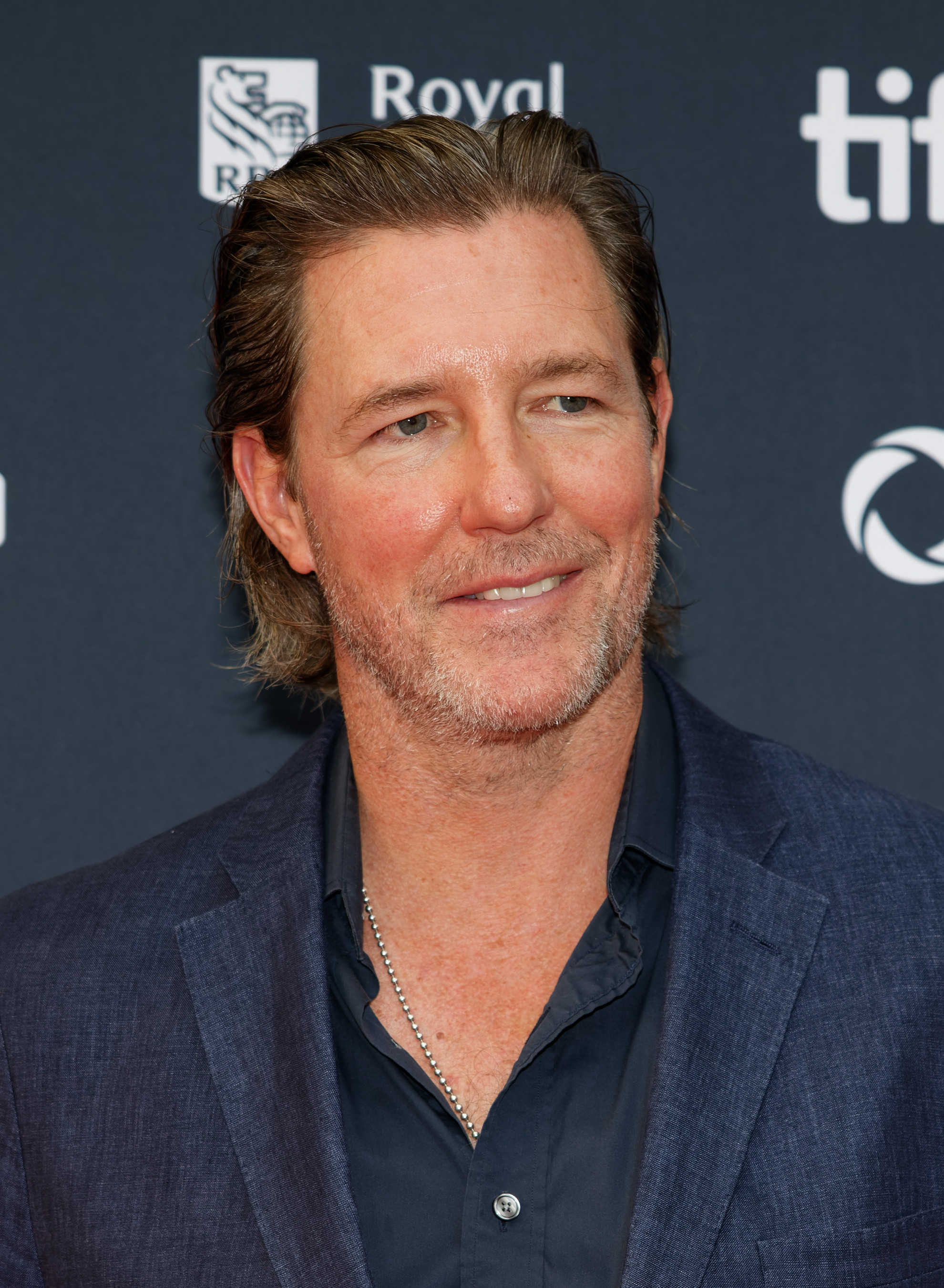
- Burns at the 2024 Toronto International Film Festival
- Born: Edward Fitzgerald Burns; January 29, 1968 (age 58); New York City, U.S.
- Occupations: Actor; director; producer; screenwriter
- Years active: 1995–present
- Notable work: The Brothers McMullen; She's the One; Sidewalks of New York; Newlyweds; The Fitzgerald Family Christmas
- Spouse: Christy Turlington (m. 2003)
- Children: 2
- Website: www.edwardburns.net

Edward Fitzgerald Burns (born January 29, 1968) is an American actor and filmmaker. He rose to fame with The Brothers McMullen (1995), his low-budget independent film that was a worldwide success. His other film appearances include Saving Private Ryan (1998), The Holiday (2006), 27 Dresses (2008), Man on a Ledge (2012), Friends with Kids (2012), and Alex Cross (2012).

Burns has directed films such as She's the One (1996), Sidewalks of New York (2001), and The Fitzgerald Family Christmas (2012). On television, he has appeared as Bugsy Siegel in the TNT crime drama series Mob City and as Terry Muldoon in TNT's Public Morals.

== Early life ==
Burns was born in Woodside, Queens, New York, the son of Edward J. Burns, a police officer and public relations spokesman, and Molly (née McKenna), a federal agency manager. He was raised a Roman Catholic. Burns is the second of three children (with siblings Mary and Brian) and is of Irish and Swedish descent. He was raised in Valley Stream, New York, on Long Island.

== Career ==
Burns got his start in the movie industry right after college as a production assistant on the Oliver Stone movie The Doors. While working at Entertainment Tonight, in his spare time he financed, produced, directed, and was featured in his first movie The Brothers McMullen, which was filmed mostly in his hometown of Valley Stream. Once he completed the movie, he was able to get a copy to Robert Redford after an ET junket interview for Quiz Show at the Rhiga Royal Hotel in Manhattan. Redford watched the film and helped it get accepted into the Sundance Film Festival, launching Burns' career.

In 1996, Burns wrote, directed, and was featured in the ensemble drama She's The One with Jennifer Aniston, Cameron Diaz and Amanda Peet, as well as in Sidewalks of New York in 2001.

As an actor, Burns appeared in the movies Saving Private Ryan (1998), Life or Something Like It (2002), and Confidence (2003). Looking for Kitty (2004), which Burns wrote, directed and starred in, was shot with a hand-held $3,000 digital Panasonic AG-DVX100 camera with a Mini35 adapter. The movie's entire budget was $200,000 and was filmed in New York City with a tiny crew and without standard permits. Burns discussed this unusual movie-making process in the director's commentary on the DVD and wrote in the Director's Letter, "If you are an aspiring filmmaker, in this day of inflating budgets and runaway production, the truth is you can make a movie for no money in New York ... and have a blast".

His movie Purple Violets premiered exclusively on iTunes on November 20, 2007. Burns began a series of guest appearances on the HBO original series Entourage midway through season 3, as well as appearing as Grace Adler's boyfriend in Will & Grace. In Entourage, Burns plays himself and is (within the context of the series) writing a new television show in which Johnny Drama is able to acquire a part. In 2007, Burns announced plans to partner with Virgin Comics to create a series entitled Dock Walloper. Burns planned to use the comic series as a springboard to a movie of the same story.

In March 2009, a series of short movies called The Lynch Pin written and directed by Burns (who was also in the cast) were released via the internet.

With the modest success of Purple Violets, Burns considered taking a studio directing assignment to make money. After reading scripts and attending meetings, he chose to remain an independent writer/director. Burns next wrote Nice Guy Johnny and filmed it quickly with the RED One camera for a reported $25,000 with a small crew. Nice Guy Johnny premiered at the Tribeca Film Festival in 2010.

To coincide with the 10th anniversary of the Tribeca Film Festival in 2011, Burns wrote Newlyweds, which he also directed and starred in. Conforming to a model similar to Nice Guy Johnny, Newlyweds was filmed in 12 days for $9,000 with a Canon 5D camera and an even smaller crew. The movie premiered at the Tribeca Film Festival in 2011 as the closing night film. Burns claimed on Twitter that the $9,000 budget was "5k for actors, 2k insurance, 2k food and drink. 9k in the can." In 2013, Burns featured as real-life gangster Bugsy Siegel in Frank Darabont's miniseries Mob City.

In 2012, Burns set up a screenwriting contest with the web startup Scripped for a crowdsourced screenplay which he intended to help get produced. In 2021 he was an advisor to ICX Media, an ad-tech audience analytics data company.

In 2024, Burns began production in the Republic of Ireland on his golf-based film Finnegan's Foursome.

== Personal life ==
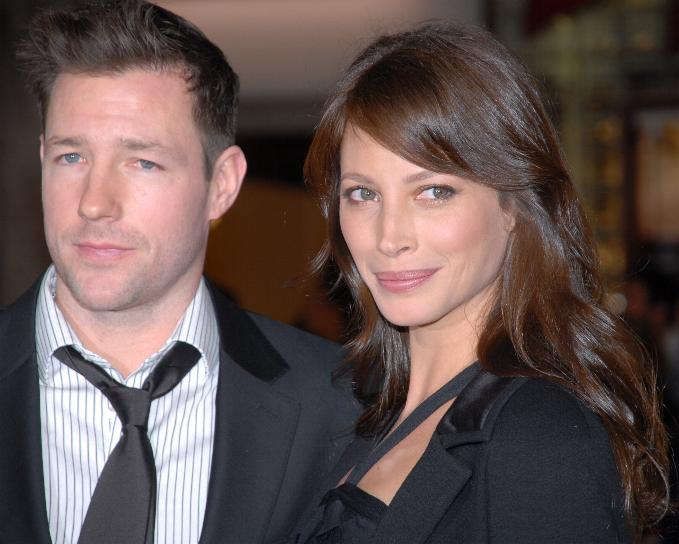
Burns with his wife Christy Turlington

Burns is married to model Christy Turlington and they have two children, a daughter born in 2003 and a son born in 2006. He and Turlington are Catholic.

== Filmography ==
=== Film ===
Year	Title	Director	Producer	Writer	Notes
1995	The Brothers McMullen	Yes	Yes	Yes	
1996	She's the One	Yes	Yes	Yes	
1998	No Looking Back	Yes	Yes	Yes	
2001	Sidewalks of New York	Yes	Yes	Yes	
2002	Ash Wednesday	Yes	Yes	Yes	
2004	Looking for Kitty	Yes	Yes	Yes	
2006	The Groomsmen	Yes	Yes	Yes	
2007	Purple Violets	Yes	Yes	Yes	Direct-to-iTunes
2010	Nice Guy Johnny	Yes	Yes	Yes	
2011	Newlyweds	Yes	Yes	Yes	
2012	The Fitzgerald Family Christmas	Yes	Yes	Yes	
2018	Summer Days, Summer Nights	Yes	Yes	Yes	
2019	Beneath the Blue Suburban Skies	Yes	Yes	Yes	Also editor
2024	Millers in Marriage	Yes	Yes	Yes	
2025	The Family McMullen	Yes	Yes	Yes	
2026	Finnegan's Foursome	Yes	Yes	Yes	

Acting roles

Year	Title	Role	Notes
1995	The Brothers McMullen	Finbar "Barry" McMullen	
1996	She's the One	Mickey Fitzpatrick	
1998	Saving Private Ryan	Private Richard Reiben	
1998	No Looking Back	Charlie	
2000	Shark Attack 2	Surfer Guy 2	Cameo; direct-to-video
2001	15 Minutes	Fire Marshal Jordan Warsaw	
2001	Sidewalks of New York	Tommy Reilly	
2002	Lethargy	Store Clerk	Short film
2002	Ash Wednesday	Francis Sullivan	
2002	Life or Something Like It	Pete Scanlon	
2003	Confidence	Jake Vig	
2004	The Breakup Artist	Himself	
2004	Looking for Kitty	Jack Stanton	
2005	A Sound of Thunder	Travis Ryer	
2005	The River King	Abel Grey	
2006	The Groomsmen	Paulie	
2006	The Holiday	Ethan Ebbers	
2007	Purple Violets	Michael Murphy	Direct-to-iTunes
2008	One Missed Call	Detective Jack Andrews	
2008	27 Dresses	George	
2009	Echelon Conspiracy	John Reed	
2010	Nice Guy Johnny	Uncle Terry	
2011	Newlyweds	Buzzy	
2011	Friends with Kids	Kurt	
2012	Man on a Ledge	Jack Dougherty	
2012	Alex Cross	Tommy Kane	
2012	The Fitzgerald Family Christmas	Gerry	
2018	Summer Days, Summer Nights	Jack Flynn	
2019	Beneath the Blue Suburban Skies	Jim	
2024	Millers in Marriage	Andy Miller	
2025	The Family McMullen	Finbar "Barry" McMullen	
2026	Finnegan's Foursome	TBA	

=== Television ===
Year	Title	Director	Executive Producer	Writer	Creator
2015	Public Morals	Yes	Yes	Yes	Yes
2021–2022	Bridge and Tunnel	Yes	Yes	Yes	Yes

Acting roles

Year	Title	Role	Notes
2005	Will & Grace	Nick	3 episodes
2006–2009	Entourage	Himself	4 episodes
2011	Vietnam in HD	Joseph L. Galloway	Voice; 3 episodes
2013	Mob City	Bugsy Siegel	5 episodes
2014	Louie	Himself	Episode: "So Did the Fat Lady"
2015	Public Morals	Terry Muldoon	10 episodes
2021–2022	Bridge and Tunnel	Artie	12 episodes

== Awards and nominations ==
Year	Award	Category	Film	Result
1995	Independent Spirit	Best First Feature Shared with Dick Fisher	The Brothers McMullen	Won
1995	Sundance Film Festival	Best Dramatic Film	The Brothers McMullen	Won
1999	Screen Actors Guild	Outstanding Performance by a Cast; Shared with Matt Damon, Jeremy Davies, Vin Diesel, Adam Goldberg, Tom Hanks, Barry Pepper, Giovanni Ribisi and Tom Sizemore	Saving Private Ryan	Nominated
1999	Online Film Critics Society	Best Ensemble Cast Performance; Shared with Damon, Davies, Diesel, Goldberg, Hanks, Pepper, Ribisi and Sizemore	Saving Private Ryan	Won
2008	Teen Choice	Choice Movie Actor: Horror/Thriller	One Missed Call	Nominated
2010	Boston Film Festival	Best Director	Nice Guy Johnny	Won
