= Purple Violets =

- Theatrical film poster
- Directed by: Edward Burns
- Written by: Edward Burns
- Produced by: Margot Bridger; Edward Burns; Becky Glupczynski; Aaron Lubin; Nicole Marra; Pamela Schein Murphy
- Starring: Selma Blair; Patrick Wilson; Edward Burns; Debra Messing
- Music by: P.T. Walkley
- Release date: November 20, 2007
- Running time: 101 minutes
- Country: United States
- Language: English
- Budget: $4 million

Purple Violets is a 2007 American independent romantic comedy film written and directed by Edward Burns, who also co-stars. It is set in lower Manhattan, about four friends from college who unexpectedly meet again after twelve years apart. The film stars Selma Blair, Patrick Wilson, Debra Messing and Burns. It also features Dennis Farina, Donal Logue and Elizabeth Reaser. Purple Violets became the first feature film to debut on the iTunes Store.

== Plot summary ==
Patti Petalson (Selma Blair) is a promising writer, but her marriage and conventional job keep her from her dream. She longs to return to her writing, especially after running into her first love, Brian Callahan (Patrick Wilson), a successful crime novelist. Kate (Debra Messing) is Patti's best friend since college. She's a tough-talking schoolteacher who plays therapist to all Patti's problems, while she's got a few of her own.

Despite Brian's gorgeous Tribeca loft and perfect house in the Hamptons, he longs to write works of greater literary value. Michael Murphy (Edward Burns), his lawyer and best friend from college, still carries a flame for former girlfriend Kate, even though their relationship ended badly. Since he spotted Kate at a restaurant, she has become all he can think about. She holds a grudge, but he will go to any length to win Kate back.

When Patti sells Murphy a new apartment, and Brian publishes his personal novel, these old friends reconnect in unexpected ways.

== Cast ==
Actor	Role
Selma Blair	Patti Petalson
Patrick Wilson	Brian Callahan
Edward Burns	Michael Murphy
Debra Messing	Kate Scott
Dennis Farina	Gilmore
Max Baker	Mark
Donal Logue	Chazz Coleman
Elizabeth Reaser	Bernadette (Bernie)
Peter Jacobson	Monroe (Cameo)
Bill Hader	Bookstore Fan (Cameo)

== Soundtrack ==
Purple Violets′ soundtrack mainly includes songs by the alternative rock band "The Blue Jackets", notoriously the indie-rock ballads "Do You Remember" and "You Send Shivers"; the latter is played during the final scene and end credits.

== Distribution ==
Purple Violets became noteworthy for being the first feature film to debut on the iTunes Store. It was released on November 20, 2007. The movie was exclusive to Apple Inc. for one month after release. Subsequently, Purple Violets was released on DVD through The Weinstein Company.
