= Public Morals (2015 TV series) =

American TV Drama

- Genre: Crime drama; Police procedural
- Created by: Edward Burns
- Written by: Edward Burns
- Directed by: Edward Burns
- Starring: Edward Burns; Michael Rapaport; Elizabeth Masucci; Katrina Bowden; Ruben Santiago-Hudson; Wass Stevens; Keith Nobbs; Austin Stowell; Patrick Murney; Lyndon Smith; Brian Wiles; Cormac Cullinane
- Country of origin: United States
- Original language: English
- No. of seasons: 1
- No. of episodes: 10

Production
- Executive producers: Edward Burns; Steven Spielberg; Justin Falvey; Darryl Frank; Aaron Lubin
- Production companies: Amblin Television; TNT Original Productions; Marlboro Road Gang Productions

Original release
- Network: TNT
- Release: August 25 – October 20, 2015

Public Morals is an American police drama television series, created, written, executive-produced, directed by and starring Edward Burns. Set in New York City during the 1960s, the show focuses on the Public Morals Division of the New York City Police Department and its officers' attempts to deal with vice in the city, while managing their personal lives as Irish Americans. The series aired from August 25 to October 20, 2015, on TNT. The network collaborated with Amblin Television, Steven Spielberg, Justin Falvey, Darryl Frank, and Aaron Lubin as producers. On December 15, 2015, TNT canceled the series after one season.

== Cast and characters ==
- Edward Burns as Officer Terry Muldoon
- Michael Rapaport as Officer Charlie Bullman, Terry's partner
- Elizabeth Masucci as Christine Muldoon, Terry's wife
- Katrina Bowden as Fortune
- Ruben Santiago-Hudson as Lt. King
- Wass Stevens as Officer Vince Latucci
- Keith Nobbs as Pat Duffy
- Austin Stowell as Officer Sean O'Bannon
- Patrick Murney as Officer Petey "Mac" MacGuinness
- Lyndon Smith as Deirdre
- Brian Wiles as Officer Jimmy Shea
- Cormac Cullinane as James Muldoon

=== Recurring ===
- Neal McDonough as Rusty Patton
- Brian Dennehy as Joe Patton
- Timothy Hutton as Mr. O'Bannon
- Anita Gillette as Eileen
- Robert Knepper as Capt. Johanson
- Fredric Lehne as Tommy Red
- Kevin Corrigan as Smitty
- Peter Gerety as Sgt. Mike Muldoon
- Aaron Dean Eisenberg as Richie Kane
- Ray Wiederhold as Monk
- Corey Cott as Ryan
- Audrey Esparza as Theresa
- Gus Halper as Sergio Tedesco

== Episodes ==
No.	Title	Directed by	Written by	Original release date	US viewers (millions)
1	"A Fine Line"	Edward Burns	Edward Burns	August 25, 2015	2.14
2	"Family is Family"	Edward Burns	Edward Burns	August 26, 2015 (online); September 1, 2015 (TNT)	1.53
3	"O'Bannon's Wake"	Edward Burns	Edward Burns	August 26, 2015 (online); September 8, 2015 (TNT)	0.96
4	"Ladies Night"	Edward Burns	Edward Burns	August 26, 2015 (online); September 15, 2015 (TNT)	0.78
5	"A Token of Our Appreciation"	Edward Burns	Edward Burns	September 22, 2015	0.63
6	"A Good Shooting"	Edward Burns	Edward Burns	September 29, 2015	0.65
7	"Collection Day"	Edward Burns	Edward Burns	October 6, 2015	0.62
8	"No Crazies on the Street"	Edward Burns	Edward Burns	October 13, 2015	0.53
9	"Starts with a Snowflake"	Edward Burns	Edward Burns	October 20, 2015	0.50
10	"A Thought and a Soul"	Edward Burns	Edward Burns	October 20, 2015	0.49

== Production ==
Creator Edward Burns began working on film scripts about Irish-American New York City police officers and Irish-American gangsters when executive producer Steven Spielberg suggested he write a script about his father's experience on the NYPD, while on the set of Saving Private Ryan. Though Public Morals did not draw from those scripts, Burns' research for them helped establish a foundation for the television series. In May 2015, TNT placed a 10-episode order for the series. While producing the series, Burns incorporated references to some of his favorite police and gangster films, including references to The Hustler, The Godfather, The French Connection, and Mean Streets, among other films.

== Release ==
The series premiered on TNT on August 25, 2015. All other episodes were released on demand before they were broadcast on TV: episodes 2–4 on August 26, and the remaining episodes on September 5, 2015.

== Reception ==
Public Morals received generally positive reviews from critics. On Rotten Tomatoes the series holds an approval rating of 82% based on 28 reviews, with an average rating of 7.06/10. The site's critical consensus reads: "Public Morals is a worthy mob crime drama, with a strong leading man and a talented supporting cast counterbalancing cliché-ridden dialogue." On Metacritic, the series has a score of 69 out of 100, based on 22 critics, indicating "generally favorable reviews".
