= Alley cat =

Alley cat may refer to:

== Cat designations ==
- Stray cat, a homeless domestic cat
- Feral cat, a cat that has been born to other ferals or from stray cats, and that are unaccustomed to human interaction
- Domestic short-haired cat or "moggie" cat more generally, as distinct from a pedigreed cat

== Media and entertainment ==
- Alley Cat (video game), a 1983 computer game by game designer Bill Williams
- Alley Cat (film), a 1984 action film
- Dora-heita, a 2000 Japanese samurai film, also known as Alley Cat
- Alley Cat (2017 film), a Japanese buddy comedy film directed by Hideo Sakaki
- Alley Cats, a British adult animated dark comedy series by Ricky Gervais

== Music ==
- The Yale Alley Cats, an all-male a cappella singing group from Yale University founded in 1943
- Alleycats (Malaysian rock band), a Malaysian musical group
- The Alley Cats (1960s group), a Los Angeles doo-wop group
- The Alley Cats (punk rock band), a Los Angeles punk rock band
- Alley Cat (album), the debut album by Danish pianist Bent Fabric
  - "Alley Cat" (song), a song by Bent Fabric that won the Grammy Award for Best Rock & Roll Recording, 1962

== Other ==
- Alleycat race, bicycle messenger races in live traffic with various checkpoints
- Alley Cat, a sister cat food brand of Meow Mix, manufactured by Del Monte Foods
- Alleycat Amber, amber ale produced by Lost Coast Brewery

== See also ==
- The Alley Cats (disambiguation)
