= The Alley Cats =

The Alley Cats may refer to:

- The Yale Alley Cats, an all-male a cappella singing group from Yale University founded in 1943
- The Alley Cats (1960s group), a 1960s musical group
- The Alley Cats (doo-wop group), a doo-wop group
- The Alley Cats (punk rock band), a punk rock band
- Alleycats (Malaysian rock band), a Malaysian band
- The Alley Cats (film), a 1966 American film

== See also ==
- Alley cat (disambiguation)
