= Gerald Barry (composer) =

Irish composer (born 1952)

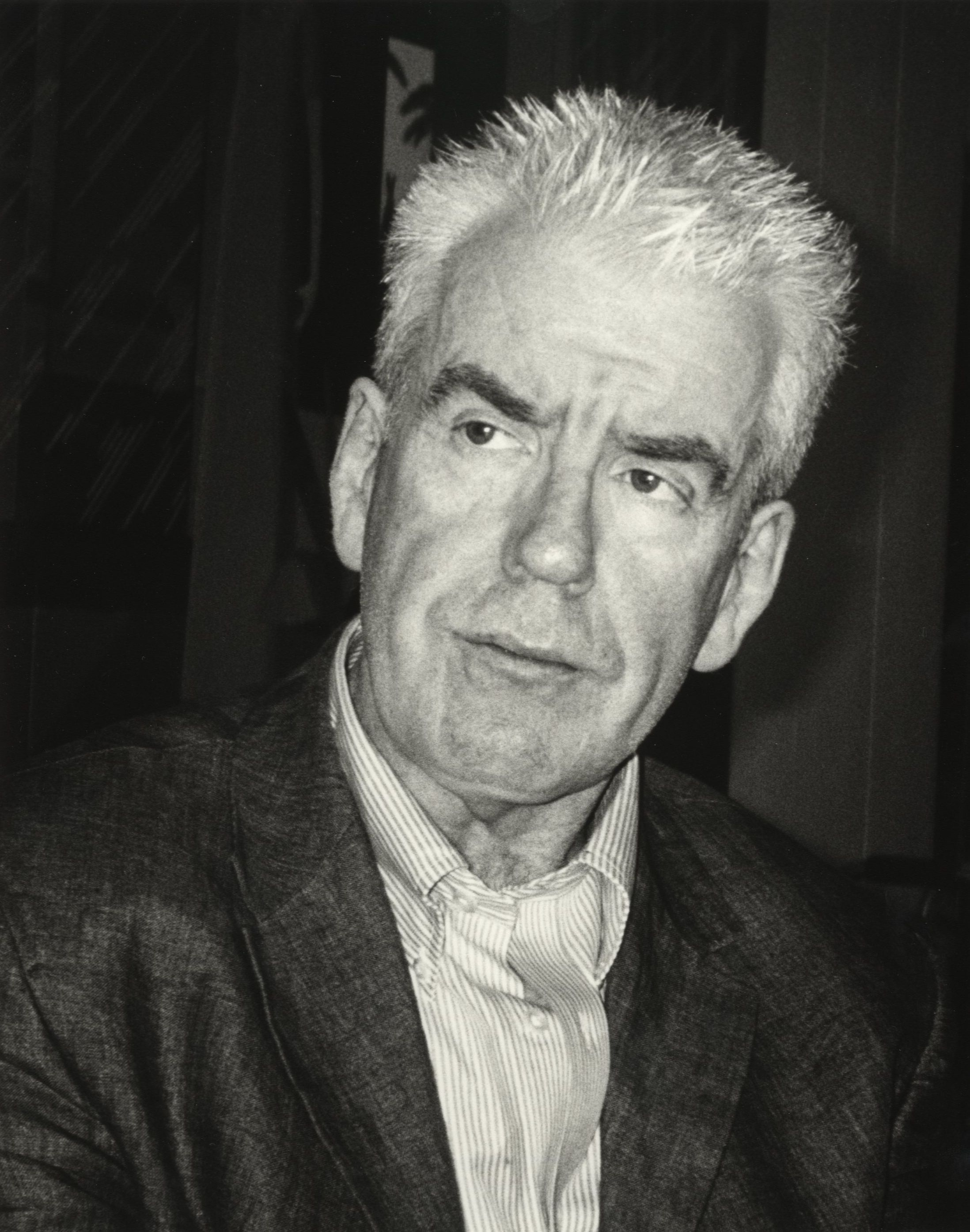
Barry in 2007

Gerald Barry (born 28 April 1952) is an Irish composer.

== Life ==
Gerald Barry was born in Clarehill, Clarecastle, County Clare, in the Republic of Ireland. He was educated at St. Flannan's College, Ennis, County Clare. He went on to study music at University College Dublin, in Amsterdam with Peter Schat, in Cologne with Karlheinz Stockhausen and Mauricio Kagel, and in Vienna with Friedrich Cerha. Barry taught at University College Cork from 1982 to 1986. Growing up in rural Clare, he had little exposure to music except through the radio: "The thing that was the lightning flash for me, in terms of Saint Paul on the road to Damascus, would have been an aria from a Handel opera, from Xerxes maybe, that I heard on the radio. I heard this woman singing this, and bang – my head went. And that was how I discovered music."

"Barry's is a world of sharp edges, of precisely defined yet utterly unpredictable musical objects. His music sounds like no one else's in its diamond-like hardness, its humour, and sometimes, its violence." He often conceives of material independently of its instrumental medium, recycling ideas from piece to piece, as in the reworking of Triorchic Blues from a violin to a piano piece to an aria for countertenor in his television opera The Triumph of Beauty and Deceit:

It seemed to me unprecedented: the combination of the ferociously objective treatment of the material and the intense passion of the working-out, and both at an extreme of brilliance. And the harmony – that there was harmony at all, and that it was so beautiful and lapidary. It functions, again, irrationally, but powerfully, to build tension and to create structure. It wasn't just repetitive. It builds. And the virtuosity, the display of it, that combination of things seemed, to me, to be new, and a major way forward.

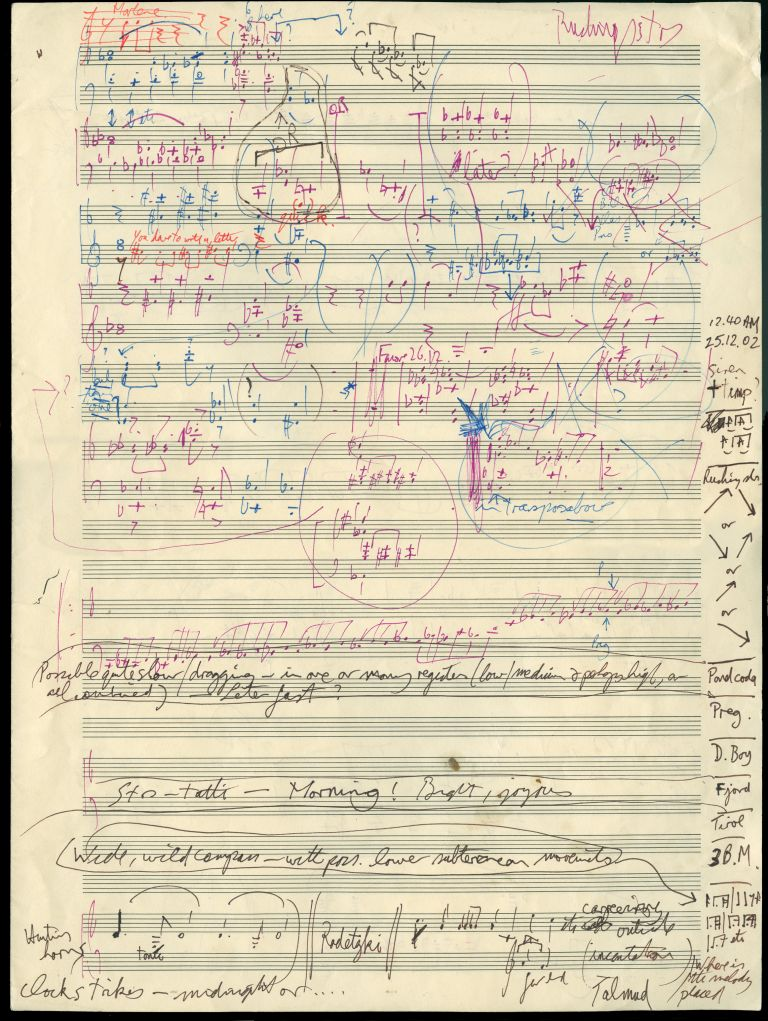
Barry's sketch for the opera The Bitter Tears of Petra von Kant

His most recent opera, The Importance of Being Earnest, has become a huge success after its world premiere at Los Angeles and European premiere at the Barbican, London. A critic comments:

He writes "what he likes" in the way Strindberg does, not trying to characterise his characters, but letting them perform his own specialities, a kind of platform for his own musical specialities. As in Strindberg where you feel every sentence stands for itself and the characters are sort of borrowed for the use of saying them (borrowed to flesh out the text, rather than the other way round), that they've been out for the day. In Gerald's opera the whole apparatus – for that's what it is – takes on a kind of surrealistic shape, like one person's torso on someone else's legs being forced to walk, half the characters in the opera and half the composer.

The Importance of Being Earnest was awarded the Royal Philhamonic Society Prize for Large Scale Composition in 2013.

In 2022 the Berlin Philharmonic commissioned Aus Die bitteren Tränen der Petra von Kant, a double bass concerto based on Act 2 from Petra, premiered in Berlin in June 2022, played by Matthew Mcdonald and conducted by John Storgards.

In September 2022 the Berlin Philharmonic played Barry’s orchestral piece, Chevaux de frise, conducted by Thomas Adès.

Barry’s Kafka’s Earplugs was premiered at the 2023 BBC Proms with the BBC Philharmonic conducted by John Storgards.

== Selected works ==
=== Operas ===
The Intelligence Park (1981–8)

Libretto by Vincent Deane, was commissioned by the London Institute of Contemporary Arts and premiered at the 1990 Ameida Opera Festival staged by David Fielding, broadcast on BBC Radio 3 and recorded on NMC Recordings. It was subsequently seen at Dublin’s Gate Theatre, The Irish Museum of Modern Art and in a new staging by Nigel Lowery at the Royal Opera House Linbury Theatre in 2019. The libretto was translated into German by Harald Beck.

The Triumph of Beauty and Deceit (1991–92)

With a libretto by Meredith Oakes, it was commissioned by Channel 4 Television with the Composers Ensemble conducted by Diego Masson. It was staged at the 2002 Aldeburgh Festival by Nigel Lowery, conducted by Thomas Adès, and toured to the London Almeida Festival and the Berliner Festwochen. Concert performances followed with the Los Angeles Philharmonic and the Birmingham Contemporary Music Group in New York and in Radio France, Paris. In 2013 it was staged at the Badisches Staatsthater Karlsruhe by Sam Brown.

The Bitter Tears of Petra von Kant (2001-4)

To the text by Rainer Werner Fassbinder, the opera received its first staging in 2005 at English National Opera directed by Richard Jones and was revived in 2007 at Theater Basel. It was done in concert in 2005 by the NSO in Dublin.

Acts 1, 3 and 4 were the basis of Barry’s Piano Concerto commissioned by Musica Viva, Munich, and performed by Nicholas Hodges and the Bavarian Radio Symphony Orchestra under Peter Rundel. In 2022 the Berlin Philharmonic commissioned a version of Act 2 as a Double Bass concerto played by Matthew McDonald and conducted by John Storgards.

La Plus Forte (2007)

To the text by Strindberg, this one-woman opera was commissioned by Radio France for the 2007 Festival Présence in Paris and sung by Barbara Hannigan with the CBSO conducted by Thomas Adès. It was subsequently done in Miami, Dublin, London, Toronto, Amsterdam and Porvoo. The English language version was premiered in 2019 in Amsterdam by Kerstin Avemo and The Concertgebouw Orchestra with Thomas Adès. It will be recorded by the BBC Concert Orchestra in 2024 at Alexandra Palace, London, and semi-staged at Nouvel Opéra Fribourg in 2024 with Alison Scherzer, soprano, and conducted by Jerome Kuhn.

The Importance of Being Earnest (2010)

To a libretto by Gerald Barry based on Oscar Wilde’s text, it was commissioned by the Los Angeles Philharmonic and the Barbican. After concert performances with Thomas Adès in Los Angeles, London and Birmingham, it was staged at Opéra Nationale de Lorraine-Nancy by Sam Brown and broadcast on France Musique, in Belfast and Dublin by Northern Irish Opera and Irish National Opera staged by Antony McDonald, at Nouvel Opéra Fribourg and Théâtre de L’Athénée, Paris, by Julien Chavaz, conducted by Jerome Kuhn, and the Royal Opera House Linbury Theatre by Ramin Gray. This production travelled to the Lincoln Center, New York, with the New York Philharmonic and Ilan Volkov.

It was awarded the Royal Philharmonic Society Prize for Large-Scale Composition in 2013. The NMC recording was nominated for a Grammy Award.

Alice's Adventures Under Ground (2014/15)

To a libretto by Gerald Barry based on the Lewis Carroll text, Alice was commissioned by the Los Angeles Philharmonic, the Barbican Centre and Britten Sinfonia. It was performed in concert in Los Angeles, London and Dublin, and received its world premiere staging by Antony McDonald at the Royal Opera House, Covent Garden, in 2020, conducted by Thomas Adés and Finnegan Downy Dear. This staging was filmed by the Irish National Opera and released on Signum Classics, with the Irish Chamber Orchestra conducted by Andre de Ridder. It was staged at Theater Magdeburg in 2022 by Julien Chavaz and conducted by Jerome Kuhn.

Salome (2017)

To a libretto by Gerald Barry based on Oscar Wilde's text, it was commissioned by the Los Angeles Philharmonic, Nederlandse Publieke Omroep, and Southbank Centre London. The LA premiere was postponed because of COVID-19 and it is planned to be performed in Los Angeles by the Los Angeles Philharmonic and Thomas Adés in 2026. World-premiere was staged by Julien Chavaz with Magdeburgische Philharmonie conducted by Jerome Kuhn, featuring Alison Scherzer as Salome and Timur Bekbosunov as King at Theater Magdeburg in 2025.

Opera is what it always was and will be. Nothing is ever in crisis. The only things that are ever in crisis are the people who use the forms. If there’s ever any weakness in anything, it’s the author’s fault. People who speak of the death of things talk rubbish. Everything remains the same. Everything is always the same. Nothing changes. All there are, are different levels of imagination, and that has always been the case. There is no advance imaginatively from Piero della Francesca to Wagner. They are both at the highest level and are therefore both the same. That’s all that matters. Any other considerations are footnotes.

— Gerald Barry, Opera Today interview

=== Selected other works ===
- Things that Gain by Being Painted for soprano, speaker, cello and piano (1977)
- Things That Gain for piano (1977)
- '_____' for ensemble (1979)
- ø for 2 pianos (1979)
- Kitty Lie Over Across From The Wall for piano and orchestra (1979)
- Sur les Pointes for piano (1981)
- Au Milieu for piano (1981)
- O Lord How Vain for choir (1984)
- Five Chorales from The Intelligence Park for two pianos (1985)
- From The Intelligence Park for orchestra (1986)
- Swinging Tripes and Trillibubkins for piano (1986)
- Water Parted from The Intelligence Park for soprano or countertenor and piano (1986)
- String Quartet No. 1 (1985)
- Chevaux-de-frise for orchestra (1988)
- Bob for ensemble (1989)
- Triorchic Blues for piano (1991)
- Sextet for ensemble (1993)
- From The Triumph of Beauty and Deceit for orchestra (1994)
- Triorchic Blues for solo trumpet (1994)
- The Chair for organ (1994)
- Piano Quartet No. 1 (1994)
- The Conquest of Ireland for solo bass voice and orchestra (1995)
- Quintet for cor anglais, clarinet, cello, double bass and piano (1994)
- Low for clarinet and piano (1995)
- Piano Quartet No. 2 (1996)
- Before The Road for four clarinets (1997)
- String Quartet No. 2 (1998)
- 1998 for violin and piano (1998)
- The Eternal Recurrence, a setting of Nietzsche for soprano and orchestra (1999)
- The Coming of Winter for choir (2000)
- Wiener Blut for large ensemble (2000)
- Wiener Blut for orchestra (2000)
- String Quartet No. 3 (Six Marches) (2001)
- Snow is White for piano quartet (2001)
- God Save the Queen for solo boy's voice, choir and large ensemble (2001)
- Dead March for large ensemble (2001)
- In the Asylum for piano trio (2003)
- Trumpeter for solo trumpet (2003)
- Day for orchestra (versions for strings and full orchestra (2005)
- Lisbon for piano and ensemble (2006)
- First Sorrow (String Quartet No. 4) (2006
- Karl Heinz Stockhausen (1928–2007) for voice and piano (2008)
- Feldman's Sixpenny Editions for large ensemble (2008)
- Le Vieux Sourd for piano (2008)
- Beethoven for bass voice and large ensemble (2008)
- No other people for orchestra (2009)
- Schott and Sons, Mainz for solo bass voice and choir (2009)
- Piano Concerto (2012)
- O Tannenbaum for choir or voice and piano (2012)
- No People for ensemble (nonet) (2013)
- Humiliated and Insulted for piano (2013)
- Baroness von Ritkart for orchestra or any number of instruments: 1 – Clever, noble, but not talented. 2 – Talented, noble, but not clever. 3 – Talented, clever, but not noble. (2014)
- Crossing the Bar for voice and any instruments or orchestra (2014)
- The Destruction of Sodom for 8 horns and 2 wind machines (2015)
- Canada for voice and orchestra (2017)
- Organ Concerto for organ and orchestra (2018)
- Viola Concerto (2019)

== Reception ==
Critics have repeatedly described Barry's music as distinctive in sound, dramatic instinct, and formal behaviour. In The Guardian, Tom Service wrote that Barry's work is marked by "diamond-like hardness", humour, and sudden violence, and argued that it "sounds like no one else's". Writing in Gramophone, Paul Griffiths described the music as "at once highly formal and iconoclastic, perky and suave, sensuous and brittle", concluding that "This is Stravinsky squared, cubism cubed."

Critical response has often focused on Barry's operas. Reviewing the recording of The Intelligence Park in The Guardian, Andrew Clements wrote that the work seemed "an even better piece now than it did 15 years ago: one moment grotesquely funny; the next touchingly beautiful". Reviewing the premiere of The Importance of Being Earnest in the Los Angeles Times, Mark Swed called it "a new genuinely comic opera" and "the most inventive Oscar Wilde opera since Richard Strauss's Salome more than a century ago". In 2019, The Guardian included the opera among its best classical works of the 21st century, writing that Barry had captured Wilde's play while adding a surreal quality entirely his own.

Other stage works have received similarly strong notices. Writing in the Los Angeles Times on Alice's Adventures Under Ground, Swed described the opera as surprising, amusing, bewildering, and moving at once. Reviewing La Plus Forte in The Arts Desk, Igor Toronyi-Lalic argued that Barry's one-act opera rose above recent operatic convention and called it one of the most significant operas of the past decade.

Barry's instrumental music has also attracted strong critical comment. In The Irish Times, Barry was described as possessing an unusual aura of excitement and originality among Irish composers.

== Recordings ==
- Gerald Barry: Chamber and Solo Piano Works. Nua Nós, Noriko Kawai (piano), Dáirine Ní Mheadhra (conductor): NMC DO22 (1994).
- Barry. Orchestral Works. National Symphony Orchestra of Ireland, Robert Houlohan (conductor): Marco Polo 8.225006 (1997).
- The Triumph of Beauty and Deceit. Soloists, Composers Ensemble, Diego Masson: Largo 5135 (1998).
- Things That Gain. Music for piano, 2 pianos, chamber and vocal music. Gerald Barry and Kevin Volans (pianos), Xenia Ensemble. Nicholas Clapton (countertenor): Black Box Music BBM 1011 (1998).
- La Jalousie Taciturne. Irish Chamber Orchestra, Fionnuala Hunt (conductor): Black Box Music BBM 1013 (1998).
- Snow is White. The Schubert Ensemble: NMC D075 (2001).
- In the Asylum. Trio Fibonacci: NMC D107 (2005).
- The Intelligence Park. Almeida Ensemble, Robert Houlihan (conductor): NMC D122 (2005).
- The Bitter Tears of Petra von Kant. Soloists, RTÉ National Symphony Orchestra, Gerhard Markson (conductor): RTÉ 261 (2005).
- Triorchic Blues for trumpet. Marco Blaauw (trumpet): BV Haast Records CD 0406 (2006).
- The Chair for organ. David Adams (self-produced, 2008).
- Lisbon. Thomas Adès (piano), Birmingham Contemporary Music Group: Contemporary Music Centre CMC CD08 (2009).
- Lady Bracknell's Song, from The Importance of Being Earnest. Gerald Barry (voice & piano): NMC D150 (2009).
- The Importance of Being Earnest. Soloists, Birmingham Contemporary Music Group, Thomas Adès (conductor): NMC D197 (2014).
- Barry meets Beethoven. Soloists, Chamber Choir Ireland, Crash Ensemble, Paul Hillier (conductor): Orchid Classics ORC 100055 (2016).
- Piano Concerto / Beethoven, for Bass and Ensemble - Nicholas Hodges (piano), Mark Stone (baritone), Britten Sinfonia, Thomas Adès (conductor): Signum Classics SIGCD616 (2020).
- The Eternal Recurrence. Jennifer France (Soprano), Britten Sinfonia, Thomas Adès (conductor): Signum Classics SIGCD659 (2021),
- Gerald Barry. In the Asylum - Fidelio Trio: Mode 332 (2022).
- Viola Concerto / The Conquest of Ireland - Laurence Power (viola), Joshua Bloom (bass), Britten Sinfonia, Thomas Adès (conductor): Signum Classics SIGCD687 (2022).
