= Alice's Adventures Under Ground =

Alice's Adventures Under Ground may refer to:

- Alice's Adventures in Wonderland, an 1865 book by Lewis Carroll, titled in manuscript Alice's Adventures Under Ground
- Alice's Adventures Under Ground (opera), a 2016 opera by Gerald Barry
