= Floyd Collins (musical) =

Musical by Adam Guettel and Tina Landau

- Music: Adam Guettel
- Lyrics: Adam Guettel
- Book: Tina Landau
- Basis: The life and death of Floyd Collins
- Productions: 1994 Philadelphia; 1996 Off-Broadway; 1999 Tour; 1999 London; 2003 Concert; 2012 London; 2025 Broadway

Floyd Collins is a musical with music and lyrics by Adam Guettel, and book by Tina Landau. The musical is a dramatization of the death of American cave explorer, Floyd Collins near Cave City, Kentucky in the winter of 1925.

The musical opened Off-Broadway on February 9, 1996, where it ran for 25 performances. There have been subsequent London productions as well as regional U.S. productions. The show made its Broadway premiere in 2025 at the Vivian Beaumont Theater as part of Lincoln Center Theatre's 2024–25 season.

== Synopsis ==
=== Act I ===
The musical tells the story of Floyd Collins during the so-called Kentucky Cave Wars, a period where poor landowners in Kentucky were exploiting the caves found on their land in an attempt to draw business and tourism to the area that was later taken by the federal government to create Mammoth Cave National Park. The show opens with a prologue, "The Ballad of Floyd Collins," in which those close to Floyd introduce the audience to the setting and the character.

On a brisk January day, Floyd enters Sand Cave, a cave on his neighbor's property, hopeful that he will find a cavern large enough to develop into a tourist attraction and turn his family's fortunes around ("The Call"). He expertly navigates narrow and difficult passages, using his voice and its echo to determine where to go next. Eventually, he does come upon such a cavern. Overjoyed, he yodels into the space, harmonizing with his own echo—but since the cavern is too large for his lantern to illuminate fully, he can only speculate about the wonders it holds ("It Moves").

Floyd begins to make his way out of the cavern, excited to tell everyone what he has found and work on making it accessible to the public ("Time to Go"). But as he heads out headfirst, a rock falls on his foot, trapping him inside a tunnel so narrow that he cannot even move his arms, let alone shift the rock. He calls for help, but is too far below ground for anyone to hear.

The next day, a trio of locals—Bee Doyle, on whose land Floyd has been exploring; Ed Bishop, a fellow caver; and Jewell Estes, a local teenager—find Floyd's jacket outside Sand Cave. They speculate that Floyd must have found something big down there. And if Floyd's gotten himself stuck? Well, it will probably turn out fine. After all, each of the three other men has been in equally tough situations and survived ("'Tween a Rock and a Hard Place").

When the Collins family learns that Floyd is trapped, Floyd's father Lee is certain it is only a matter of someone being able to get down there and help him. As the men try to strategize, Miss Jane (Lee's wife and Floyd's stepmother) confides to Nellie (Floyd's sister) that Floyd recently told her about a dream he had about being trapped. Nellie, who has recently returned home from a mental asylum and who has a special connection with Floyd, tells Miss Jane that Floyd's gotten out of worse scrapes than this, and they should not worry ("Lucky").

In some versions: Floyd's family and fellow cavers discuss Floyd's love of exploring and the dangers involved ("Where A Man Belongs"). When this song is used, it replaces "'Tween a Rock and a Hard Place".

Floyd's younger brother Homer goes down into Sand Cave to try to free him, but Homer cannot even reach his head. It becomes clear that Floyd's rescue will not be as easy as anyone had hoped, and Floyd begins to panic. To soothe him, Homer reminds him of the nights they've spent in caves together before, and promises Floyd that he'll spend tonight with him as well ("Daybreak").

William Burke "Skeets" Miller, a cub reporter for the Louisville Courier, arrives on the scene, having been dispatched to investigate whether Floyd's entrapment is a hoax. Being small and slender, he is able to squeeze all the way through to Floyd ("I Landed on Him"). Though he is terrified by the experience, he feels deep empathy for Floyd and joins the rescue effort. H.T. Carmichael, a local engineer, suggests fastening a harness around Floyd so they can pull him out, even if it means ripping his foot off.

As Skeets (the only one who has been able to make it all the way down to Floyd) fastens the harness around Floyd's torso, Floyd distracts himself by wondering whether he'll find love when he gets out ("And She'd Have Blue Eyes"). The pulling begins, but the harness idea is quickly discarded, as it hurts Floyd enough that he thinks it might kill him.

Lee becomes increasingly distressed. Miss Jane tells him that she loves his children as her own, and they will get through this together ("Heart and Hand").

Skeets goes down into Sand Cave again, both to continue his efforts to dig around Floyd's body in hopes of reaching the rock that has trapped his foot, and to tell Floyd that his articles about the entrapment have been syndicated nationwide. He asks Floyd for an interview so he can quote him directly, and the two men bond as they converse. Floyd confesses that he is afraid he might die in this cave. Skeets swears to free him.

Aboveground, outsiders begin showing up, including a filmmaker who instantly becomes interested in putting Homer on the silver screen, and a doctor from Chicago who tells the family that amputating Floyd's leg to get him out would result in enough blood loss that he would probably die anyway. H.T. Carmichael takes charge of the rescue operation, declaring that nobody is to go into the cave again without his explicit approval. But Homer, having just learned from Skeets about how much digging progress has been made, sneaks past him and goes down to see Floyd again.

Homer continues digging, attempting to widen the passageway Floyd is trapped in. As he works, Floyd becomes increasingly annoyed at the slowness of the progress. To distract Floyd and keep his spirits up, Homer plays a riddle game with him, in which the answers are all good memories from their shared childhood ("The Riddle Song"). By the end of the song, Homer has widened the passageway enough that he can squeeze through, and the brothers are able to embrace for the first time since Floyd became trapped.

=== Act II ===
As Skeets Miller's stories about Floyd draw national attention, legions of new reporters arrive, not just sniffing around for news but exaggerating every detail they find, in hopes that sensationalism will sell more papers (“Is That Remarkable?”)

By the next Sunday, tens of thousands of people from around the country have arrived at Bee Doyle's farm in hopes of seeing Floyd get rescued. Even the Collinses get swept up in “The Carnival”—Nellie dances with performers and gawkers, Lee sells photos of Floyd for a dollar apiece, and Homer starts getting offers to appear on the vaudeville stage.

Below ground, as Skeets tells Floyd about what's happening above, he tries to use a jack to pry the rock off Floyd's foot... but fails. As Skeets leaves the cave for what will turn out to be the last time, a collapse in the passageway cuts Floyd off completely from his would-be rescuers.

When Nellie learns about the collapse, she becomes upset that she may never see her brother again, and dreams of freeing him (“Through the Mountain”).

Meanwhile, a divide in rescue strategy, the presence of an overwhelming amount of media, and the arrival of the National Guard deepens the tension between the locals and outsiders. Since the collapse has rendered the cave impassable, engineer Carmichael announces plans to dig a shaft down to Floyd. Homer, who opposes this plan, tells Carmichael that he doesn't know what he is doing. Carmichael orders Homer removed from the rescue site, which causes Homer to angrily reflect on whether he even belongs at home anymore (“Git Comfortable”).

(In the 2025 Broadway production: Below ground, entirely isolated, Floyd finally comes up with an answer to a question Skeets asked him days ago. Skeets had asked what Floyd finds appealing about cave exploration; Floyd now describes the awe he feels when he explores caves. He imagines their long history, dating back to ancient times, and imagines himself a part of that history (“It Moves”).)

As torrential rain slows progress on the Carmichael shaft, the mood aboveground becomes increasingly despondent. As the locals begin to talk about Floyd in the past tense, Homer begins seriously considering whether he should accept a vaudeville offer so he can tell Floyd's story (“The Ballad of Floyd Collins” (Reprise)).

Skeets Miller works in the Carmichael shaft, digging laterally in hopes of finally reaching Floyd. As he does so, he calls out to Floyd, but is unsure about whether he is really hearing a response. He apologizes for the part he played in turning Floyd from a human being into a media sensation.

Floyd has a joyful vision of himself being reunited with Nellie, Homer, and everyone else (“The Dream”). In this vision, Sand Cave has been developed and turned into a successful tourist attraction, and people have begun hailing Floyd as “the greatest caver ever known.” But when he yodels as he did when he first discovered the place, hoping to show off the beautiful echoes he heard there, his voice doesn't echo back. This breaks the vision, and Floyd realizes not only that he is still trapped, but that he is about to die.

Skeets informs the audience that by the time the shaft reached Floyd, he had already died of starvation and exhaustion.

As he faces death head-on, Floyd wonders aloud what heaven might be like, and hopes he'll be reunited with his deceased mother (“How Glory Goes”). As he dies, he yodels into the cave again. This time, his voice echoes back.

== Production history ==
=== Origins ===
Adam Guettel and Tina Landau were students at Yale University when they first met and decided to collaborate on a project together. Looking for inspiration, Landau proposed to Guettel a musical about Floyd Collins after reading about the story in a Reader's Digest issue. The project was originally called Deathwatch Carnival before it was decided to name the musical after the titular character. After a series of research, small readings and workshops, the completed piece premiered at the American Music Theater Festival, in Philadelphia, in 1994 with Mary Beth Peil as Miss Jane.

=== Off-Broadway (1996) ===
After revisions in 1995, the show next opened Off-Broadway at Playwrights Horizons, New York City, on February 9, 1996, and closed on March 24, 1996, after 25 performances. Directed by Landau, the cast included Christopher Innvar as Floyd Collins, Don Chastain as Lee Collins, Martin Moran as Skeets Miller, Jason Danieley as Homer Collins, and Theresa McCarthy as Nellie Collins, Cass Morgan as Miss Jane, and Brian d'Arcy James, Matthew Bennett and Michael Mulheren in the ensemble.

In 2003, a reunion concert was held at Playwrights Horizons with Romain Frugé as Floyd Collins, Terrence Mann as Lee Collins, and most of the original cast.

=== Regional and international productions ===
After a three-stop mini US tour in 1999, including San Diego's Old Globe Theatre, Chicago's Goodman Theatre, and Philadelphia's American Music Theatre Festival, where it had first premiered.

The show had its first independent regional production at New Line Theatre in St. Louis, Missouri, in November 1999.

The show made its London and European debut at the Bridewell Theatre in July 1999, with Nigel Richards as Floyd, Anna Francolini as Nellie, and Craig Purnell as Homer. The highly acclaimed production was directed by Clive Paget.

A London revival was produced at The Vault, Southwark Playhouse in February and March 2012. The production was directed by Derek Bond, with Glenn Carter as Floyd, Robyn North as Nellie, Gareth Chart as Homer and Ryan Sampson as Skeets. The production was produced by Peter Huntley and was long-listed for the Ned Sherrin Award for Best Musical at the Evening Standard Theatre Awards and received the 2012 Offie for Best Musical Production.

A Chicago revival was produced at BoHo Theatre in June and July 2012. The production was directed by Peter Marston Sullivan, with Jim DeSelm as Floyd, Jon Harrison as Homer, and Sarah Bockel as Nellie. Other regional productions include Actors Theatre of Louisville (2001), Aurora Theatre (2002), Carolina Actors Studio Theatre (2011), and Ophelia Theatre Group (2015).

The first known high school debut of the musical was by the Philelectic Society at Jesuit High School in New Orleans on November 19, 2026, directed by Patrick Cragin.

=== Broadway (2025) ===
On June 10, 2024, it was announced that the musical would make its Broadway debut at the Vivian Beaumont Theater as part of Lincoln Center Theater's 2024–25 season, with Landau once again directing the production. Previews were set to begin on March 27, 2025, before an opening date of April 21. The March 27 preview was ultimately cancelled, delaying preview openings to March 28. The show closed on June 22, 2025, after completing its scheduled limited run at the Vivian Beaumont Theatre.

The cast was led by Jeremy Jordan in the title role, starring alongside Jason Gotay, Sean Allan Krill, Marc Kudisch, Lizzy McAlpine, Wade McCollum, Jessica Molaskey, Cole Vaughan and Taylor Trensch. The production included orchestrations by Bruce Coughlin, music direction by Ted Sperling, sound by Dan Moses Schreier, choreography by Jon Rua, lighting by Scott Zielinski and projections by Ray Horng Sun. Lincoln Center Theater produced the show in association with Creative Partners Productions and Mark Cortale and Charles D. Urstadt.

== Original casts ==
Character	Off-Broadway	US National Tour	Off-West End	Off-Broadway Reunion Concert	Broadway
Character	1996	1999		2003	2025
Floyd Collins	Christopher Innvar	Romain Frugé	Nigel Richards	Romain Frugé	Jeremy Jordan
Homer Collins	Jason Danieley	Clarke Thorell	Craig Purnell	Jason Danieley	Jason Gotay
Nellie Collins	Theresa McCarthy	Kim Huber	Anna Francolini	Theresa McCarthy	Lizzy McAlpine
Lee Collins	Don Chastain	John Taylor	Ian Burford	Terrence Mann	Marc Kudisch
Miss Jane	Cass Morgan	Anne Allgood	Jill Martin	Cass Morgan	Jessica Molaskey
Skeets Miller	Martin Moran	Guy Adkins	Jeremy David	Martin Moran	Taylor Trensch
H.T. Carmichael	Michael Mulheren	John Ahlin	Derek T. Bell	John Christopher Jones	Sean Allan Krill
Bee Doyle	Stephen Lee Anderson	Marty Higginbotham	Colin Hill	Stephen Lee Anderson	Wade McCollum
Dr. Hazlett	Matthew Bennett	James Moye	-	Matthew Bennett	Kevyn Morrow
Con Man	James Bohanek	Ryan Perry	-	Michael Seelbach	-
Cliff Roney	Brian d'Arcy James	Jack Donahue	-	Jeffrey Kuhn	Zak Resnick
Jewell Estes	Jesse Lenat	Jacob Garrett White	Scott Fleming	Jesse Lenat	Cole Vaughan
Ed Bishop	Rudy Roberson	Michael-Leon Wooley	Philip Wrigley	Michael-Leon Wooley	Clyde Voce

== Characters ==
- Floyd Collins – a cave explorer
- Homer Collins – Floyd's brother
- Nellie Collins – Floyd's sister
- Lee Collins – Floyd's father
- Miss Jane – Floyd's step-mother
- Skeets Miller - a journalist who won the Pulitzer Prize for Journalism in 1926 for his news coverage of the Floyd rescue mission
- Jewell Estes – a young local boy
- Bee Doyle – a local man who owned the land where Floyd was exploring
- Ed Bishop – a fellow cave explorer
- H.T Carmichael – an engineer
- Cliff Roney – a filmmaker
- Dr. William Hazlett – a doctor
- Frederick Jordan – a farmer

== Musical numbers ==
Act I

- "Ballad of Floyd Collins" – Company
- "The Call" – Floyd
- "It Moves" – Floyd*
- "Time to Go" – Floyd†
- "Lucky" – Nellie and Miss Jane
- "'Tween a Rock An' a Hard Place" (replaced by "Where a Man Belongs" in 1999) – Family and Locals**
- "Daybreak" – Homer and Floyd
- "Ballad of Floyd Collins" (Reprise) – Jewell
- "I Landed on Him" – Skeets Miller
- "And She'd Have Blue Eyes" – Floyd
- "Heart An' Hand" – Miss Jane and Lee
- "Riddle Song" – Homer and Floyd

Act II

- "Is That Remarkable?" – Reporters and Company
- "Carnival" – Floyd and Company
- "Through the Mountain" – Nellie
- "Git Comfortable" – Homer
- "Ballad of Floyd Collins" (2nd Reprise) – Jewell
- "The Dream" – Floyd, Nellie, Homer and Company
- "How Glory Goes" – Floyd

Notes

- * "It Moves" is moved in between "Git Comfortable" and "Ballad Of Floyd Collins (2nd Reprise)" in the 2025 Broadway production.
- ** "'Tween a Rock" is moved in between "The Call" and "Lucky" in the 2025 Broadway production.
- † Combined with "The Call" in the 2025 Broadway production, and as such not listed separately in the Playbill.

== Recordings ==
The original cast recording was released by Nonesuch Records on March 18, 1997.

The following songs are not included on the recording:

- "And She'd Have Blue Eyes"
- "The Ballad of Floyd Collins (reprise) (act 1)"
- "Where a Man Belongs"

The finale song is the title track of Audra McDonald's 2000 album How Glory Goes and was also included on Brian Stokes Mitchell's 2006 self-titled album and Kelli O'Hara's 2011 album Always.

A cast recording of the 2025 Lincoln Center production was released by Center Stage Records, streaming and on digital platforms on August 8, 2025, and on CD on September 5, 2025. The recording was produced by Guettel and Ted Sperling.

== Critical reception ==
Despite having a run of only 25 performances, the 1996 off-Broadway run left a strong impression on contemporary theatre. John Simon, writing for New York Magazine, proclaimed that Floyd Collins was "the original and daring musical of our day." He also wrote that "Floyd Collins reestablishes America's sovereignty in a genre it created, but has since lost hold of: it is the modern musical's true and exhilarating ace in the hole." Reviewing a 2016 production, Terry Teachout, writing for The Wall Street Journal, called it "the finest work of American musical theater, not excluding opera, to come along since Stephen Sondheim's Sweeney Todd".

Ben Brantley, in his review for The New York Times, wrote, "Mr. Guettel establishes himself as a young composer of strength and sophistication."

== Awards and nominations ==
=== 1996 Original production ===
Year	Award	Category	Nominated work	Result	Ref.
1996	Drama Desk Awards	Outstanding Musical	Floyd Collins	Nominated	
1996	Drama Desk Awards	Outstanding Director of a Musical	Tina Landau	Nominated	
1996	Drama Desk Awards	Outstanding Lyrics	Adam Guettel	Nominated	
1996	Drama Desk Awards	Outstanding Music	Adam Guettel	Nominated	
1996	Drama Desk Awards	Outstanding Orchestrations	Bruce Coughlin	Nominated	
1996	Drama Desk Awards	Outstanding Sound Design	Dan Moses Schreier	Won	
1996	Obie Awards	Best Music	Adam Guettel	Won	
1996	Lucille Lortel Awards	Outstanding Musical	Floyd Collins	Won	
1996	Outer Critics Circle Awards	Outstanding New Off-Broadway Musical	Floyd Collins	Nominated	

=== 2025 Broadway production ===
Year	Award	Category	Nominee	Result	Ref.
2025	Drama Desk Awards	Outstanding Revival of a Musical	Floyd Collins	Nominated	
2025	Drama Desk Awards	Outstanding Lead Performance in a Musical	Jeremy Jordan	Nominated	
2025	Drama Desk Awards	Outstanding Featured Performance in a Musical	Jason Gotay	Nominated	
2025	Drama Desk Awards	Outstanding Lighting Design for a Musical	Scott Zielinski and Ruey Horng Sun (projections)	Nominated	
2025	Drama Desk Awards	Outstanding Sound Design in a Musical	Dan Moses Schreier	Nominated	
2025	Drama League Awards	Outstanding Revival of a Musical	Floyd Collins	Nominated	
2025	Outer Critics Circle Awards	Outstanding Revival of a Musical	Floyd Collins	Nominated	
2025	Outer Critics Circle Awards	Outstanding Lead Performer in a Broadway Musical	Jeremy Jordan	Nominated	
2025	Tony Awards	Best Revival of a Musical		Nominated	
2025	Tony Awards	Best Actor in a Musical	Jeremy Jordan	Nominated	
2025	Tony Awards	Best Featured Actor in a Musical	Taylor Trensch	Nominated	
2025	Tony Awards	Best Orchestrations	Bruce Coughlin	Nominated	
2025	Tony Awards	Best Lighting Design of a Musical	Scott Zielinski and Ruey Horn Sun	Nominated	
2025	Tony Awards	Best Sound Design of a Musical	Dan Moses Schreier	Nominated	
