= Lost Coast (disambiguation) =

The Lost Coast is a mostly undeveloped section of the California's North Coast in Humboldt and Mendocino Counties

Lost Coast may also refer to:

- Half-Life 2: Lost Coast, a video game and tech demo
- Lost Coast Brewery, an American microbrewery located in Eureka, California
