= Belfast Operatic Company =

The 2009 BOC production of Hello, Dolly!.

Belfast Operatic Company (BOC) is an amateur company that performs musicals and concerts throughout Ireland. It was founded in 1960 by John Mercer in Belfast, Northern Ireland.

The company performed the Irish première of Titanic the Musical in 2005, for which it won awards from the Association of Irish Musical Societies (AIMS), and again in 2007. BOC performs several shows each year at the Grand Opera House, Belfast. In May 2009, the company performed a sell-out run of the musical, Hello, Dolly!, obtaining positive reviews and earning the lead role, Dolly Levi, played by Laura Kerr, a nomination for Best Actress from AIMS.

In 2009, BOC moved into a new purpose-built rehearsal studio located in East Belfast, with modern facilities, multiple rehearsal rooms and a social area to congregate after rehearsals. The company has over 100 members who meet each Monday evening to prepare for their busy concert schedule.

In March 2010, the company's 50th year in production, Belfast Operatic Company performed Beauty and the Beast at the Grand Opera House in Belfast.

In March 2023, BOC performed Disney's The Hunchback of Notre Dame and recently finished their run of The Phantom of The Opera at The Theatre at The Mill in May 2024. They are currently co-producing the UK & Ireland amateur premiere production of Les Misérables alongside Ulster Operatic, and St Agnes' Choral Society, which will take place in a sold-out Grand Opera House from 4th-8th March 2025.

== Key people ==
The following are key members:

- President – Thompie Steele
- Chairperson – Jordan Rainey
- Secretary – Gary Redpath
- Treasurer – Elizabeth Boyd
- Musical Director – Colin Scott

== Gallery ==
Photographs from Hello, Dolly! at the Grand Opera House, Belfast, May 2009:

Harmonia Gardens scene from Hello, Dolly!.

A scene from Hello, Dolly!.

Laura Kerr as Dolly Levi from backstage.
