= Matthew Bennett (TV producer) =

American actor, producer and director

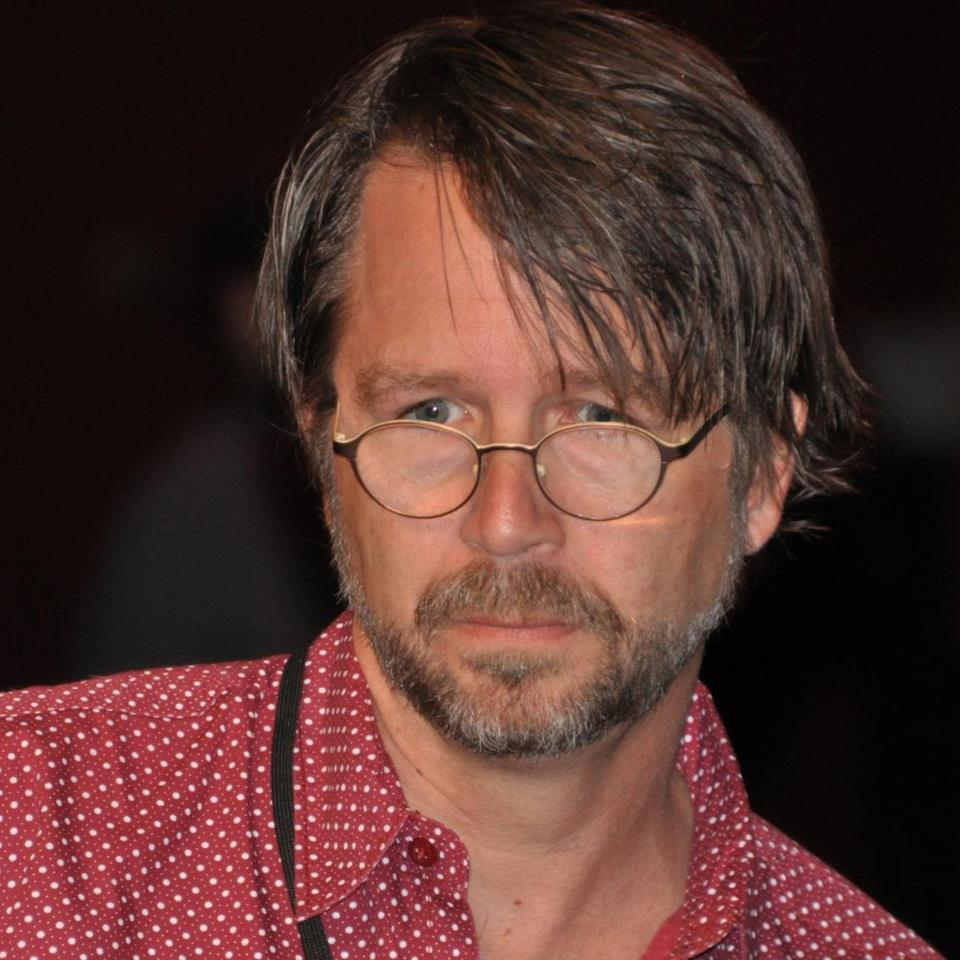
- Other name: Matt Bennett
- Occupations: Television director; Television producer; Former stage actor
- Years active: 1986–2003 (actor); 2004–present (director/producer)
- Spouses: Dorrie Joiner (m. 19??; d. 1999); Marsha Dietlein (m. 2001)

Matthew Bennett is an American television producer and director and former Broadway stage actor.

== Career ==
=== Theater ===
From 1986 until 2003, Bennett was an actor in New York City. He made a career on the New York stage in the original productions of Floyd Collins, Titanic, Blood Brothers, Zara Spook and Other Lures, Amour, Radio Gals, Anne Bogart's Marathon Dancing, and the original off-Broadway (Sullivan Street) production of The Fantasticks.

Bennett created the musical stage play, Ten Years Apart, as well as the play Badger Country, both with writing partner Sean McCourt.

=== Television ===
Bennett is the founder of the television and film production company, Silent Crow Arts. Notably, he created the first modern "after show" television format: the Deadliest Catch partner series, After The Catch, for Discovery Channel. Bennett has also served as Executive Producer, director and showrunner on many television specials, pilots and series.

In addition to performing on stage and in film, Bennett also acted in roles for television's Law & Order, Law and Order SVU, and Remember WENN.

== Partial filmography ==
=== Television director ===
- Spike TV's 52 Favorite Cars (2004)
- FutureCar (2007)
- Ice Road Truckers: Off the Ice (2007)
- After the Climb (2007)
- The Next Big Bang (2008)
- Dark Fellowships: The Vril (2008)
- The Truth About Traffic (2009)
- Understanding Ardi (2009)
- Lobster Wars (6 episodes, 2009)
- Deadliest Catch: After The Catch (33 episodes, 2007–2012)
- Deadliest Catch: Revelations (2012)
- Deadliest Catch: The Bait (2013)

=== Television producer ===
- AutoRox Awards (Special, 2005)
- The Great Biker Build Off "Ultimate Chop" (Awards Show, 2005)
- Ballroom Bootcamp (Series, 2005)
- FutureCar (Mini-series, 2007)
- Eco-Tech (Mini-series, 2007)
- The Next Big Bang (Special, 2008)
- Dark Fellowships: The Vril (Special, 2008)
- The Truth About Traffic (Special, 2009)
- Understanding Ardi (Special, 2009)
- Deadliest Catch: After the Catch (Series, 2009–2012)
- Garbage Moguls (4-Part Special, 2009–2010)
- Lobster Wars (Series, 2009–2010)
- Mad Scientists (Series, 2011)
- Deadliest Catch: The Bait (Series, 2013-2016)
- Driving America (Special, 2015)
- Barnwood Builders (Series, 2013-)

=== Actor ===
- Working Girl (1988)
- Remember WENN (2 episodes, 1996–1997) (TV)
- The Rosie O'Donnell Show (1 episode, 1997) (TV)
- Law & Order (1 episode, 1999) (TV)
- Cradle Will Rock (1999)
- Engine Trouble (2002)
- Law & Order: Special Victims Unit (1 episode, 2003) (TV)

== Recognition ==
The theatrical production Ten Years Apart in which Bennett also starred, was created by Bennett and his partner Sean McCourt. St. Paul Pioneer Press called the production "Innovative, but ultimately ineffective," noting that its stars (Matthew Bennett and Sean McCourt) "are both adept musicians, highly adaptable actors and solid singers. Their resumes show accomplishment, and they're both gifted and versatile enough to enjoy good strong careers." The Cincinnati Enquirer called the musical "a wrenching tale of a full life," and said, "Some musicals offer nothing more than an excuse to come in out of the rain. But this play put a hand on my heart... The play got to me. Tears. Hard swallows. Long thoughts."

== Personal life ==
Bennett was married to actress Dorrie Joiner until her early death in 1999.
He is now married to actress Marsha Dietlein Bennett.
