= The Tricky Part =

2005 book by Martin Moran

The Tricky Part: One Boy's Fall from Trespass into Grace
- Author: Martin Moran
- Language: English
- Genre: Autobiography
- Published: 2005
- Publisher: Beacon Press
- Publication place: United States
- Pages: 285
- ISBN: 9780807072622
- OCLC: 849080459

The Tricky Part: One Boy's Fall from Trespass into Grace is a 2005 non-fiction book by Martin Moran.

Between the age of 12 and 15, Martin Moran had a sexual relationship with Bob Doyle, a Vietnam veteran who was a counselor at a Catholic boys' camp. Thirty years later, he meets his abuser again.

The book placed second for the Barnes & Noble Discover Great New Writers Award for Nonfiction in 2005 and won the Randy Shilts Award for Gay Non-Fiction from Publishing Triangle in 2006.

== Plot summary ==
The Tricky Part tells the story of the relationship and its effect on Moran, who grew up as a homosexual. It describes Moran's sexual awakening, and how he and a chubby friend of his called George, go with Bob to get the camp ready. Bob pulls Moran into his sleeping bag the first night they are alone (with George asleep beside them) and abuses him.

A year later, Moran discovers that a friend of his, Kip, another 13-year-old, is also being abused by Bob. The abuse continues through puberty and adolescence and Moran tries to tell Bob that he wants it all to stop. Bob's response is to invite the boy into bed with him and his cowgirl-friend Karen. Bob is finally arrested and jailed for his sex crimes.

== Theme ==
Moran's desperate coming of age is described with candor and humor and sets out the paradox that what is, in nearly everyone's eyes, a seriously damaging experience, can be the very thing that gives "rise to transformation, even grace".

The book condemns adult–child sex. Moran is ambivalent about the touching and other sexual acts. He tries to commit suicide twice, but eventually finds his feet in Off-Broadway and Broadway theater.

Moran has also developed and performed The Tricky Part as a one-man play.
