= Titanic (musical) =

1997 musical based on the sinking of RMS Titanic

- Poster for the 1997 Broadway production
- Music: Maury Yeston
- Lyrics: Maury Yeston
- Book: Peter Stone
- Premiere: April 23, 1997: Lunt-Fontanne Theatre
- Productions: 1997 Broadway; 1999 US tour 2018 UK tour 2024 Encores!
- Awards: Tony Award for Best Musical; Tony Award for Best Score; Tony Award for Best Book; Tony Award for Best Orchestrations

Titanic is a musical with music and lyrics by Maury Yeston and a book by Peter Stone. It is based on the story of the RMS Titanic which sank on its maiden voyage on April 15, 1912.

The musical opened on Broadway on April 23, 1997, in a production directed by Richard Jones; it won five Tony Awards, including Best Musical, and ran for 804 performances. It is not related to the 1997 film of the same name.

== Background ==
In 1985, the wreck of the RMS Titanic was found about 370 miles (600 km) south-southeast off the coast of Newfoundland, at a depth of about 12,500 feet beneath the surface of the Atlantic Ocean. This attracted the interest of Maury Yeston, a musical theater composer and lyricist best known for the 1982 Broadway musical Nine. Said Yeston:

"What drew me to [a musical about the story of the Titanic] was the positive aspects of what the ship represented – 1) humankind's striving after great artistic works and similar technological feats, despite the possibility of tragic failure, and 2) the dreams of the passengers on board: 3rd Class, to immigrate to America for a better life; 2nd Class, to live a leisured lifestyle in imitation of the upper classes; 1st Class, to maintain their privileged positions forever. The collision with the iceberg dashed all of these dreams simultaneously, and the subsequent transformation of character of the passengers and crew had, it seemed to me, the potential for great emotional and musical expression onstage."

Both Yeston and Peter Stone, the show's librettist, knew the idea was an unusual one for a musical: as Yeston explained, "I think if you don't have that kind of daring damn-the-torpedoes, you shouldn't be in this business. It's the safe sounding shows that often don't do well. You have to dare greatly, and I really want to stretch the bounds of the kind of expression in musical theater."

Yeston saw the story as unique to turn-of-the-century British culture, with its rigid social class system and romanticizing of progress through technology. "In order to depict that on the stage, because this is really a very English show," said Yeston, "I knew I would have to have a color similar to the one found in the music of the great composers at that time, like Elgar or Vaughan Williams; this was for me an opportunity to bring in the musical theater an element of the symphonic tradition that I think we really haven't had before. That was very exciting." The producers consulted the archives of the Titanic International Society for accurate portrayal of the play's characters.

The high cost of Titanic′s set, designed by Stewart Laing, made it impossible for the show to have traditional out-of-town tryouts. Titanic′s previews began at Broadway's Lunt-Fontanne Theatre in 1997 with various technical troubles which were overcome by opening night, initially receiving mixed to positive reviews. The New Yorker′s was the first of numerous later unqualified raves: "It seemed a foregone conclusion that the show would be a failure; a musical about history's most tragic maiden voyage, in which fifteen hundred people lost their lives, was obviously preposterous.... Astonishingly, Titanic manages to be grave and entertaining, somber and joyful; little by little you realize that you are in the presence of a genuine addition to American musical theatre."

It ran 804 performances winning five Tony Awards (including Best Musical), and the advocacy of Rosie O'Donnell. With a Grammy Award nominated cast album, over the next twenty years the show received hundreds of professional and amateur productions worldwide and has become a national and international staple of musical theater.

Although it premiered in the same year as the film Titanic, also about the doomed ship, the musical and film have no connection.

== Productions ==
=== 1997 original Broadway production ===
Titanic opened on April 23, 1997, at the Lunt-Fontanne Theatre and ran for 804 performances and 27 previews, closing on March 21, 1999. Directed by Richard Jones with choreography by Lynne Taylor-Corbett, the cast included John Cunningham, David Garrison, Larry Keith, Alma Cuervo, Michael Cerveris, Victoria Clark, Don Stephenson, Judy Blazer, and Brian d'Arcy James. Danny Burstein was a cast replacement. The set encompassed three levels to help form the impression of the size of the ship. The lobby of the Lunt-Fontanne Theatre was redecorated for the production: the complete passenger list of the Titanic was painted on the walls, noting those who ultimately survived the disaster.

Orchestrator Jonathan Tunick won the first Tony Award for Best Orchestrations for his work on the score. The show received four other Tony nominations, winning in all five categories in which it was nominated, including the Tony Award for Best Musical.

Stewart Laing was responsible for both the costume design and the scenic design, for which he won a Tony Award for Best Scenic Design. The wardrobe is on display at the Costume World Broadway Collection in Pompano Beach, Florida. Paul Gallo was responsible for the lighting design. Steve Canyon Kennedy was responsible for the sound design.

=== First US National tour ===
The production toured the United States after closing on Broadway, beginning in January 1999 at the Ahmanson Theatre in Los Angeles, with a cast that featured Brian d'Arcy James (Los Angeles only), Marcus Chait, William Parry, Adam Heller, David Pittu, and Matthew Yang King. There were also several subsequent tours with non-Equity performers.

=== Ensemble version ===
In 2012 original Broadway cast member Don Stephenson, who created the part of Charles Clarke, developed a new chamber version of Titanic in collaboration with choreographer Liza Gennaro. This scaled down production used 20 actors playing all of the roles, an abstract set design, projections of the actual ship and passengers, and new orchestrations designed to make the score sound as if it was being played by the ship's band. Material that had been previously cut from the original Broadway production was put back into the show, and existing material was reordered and reassigned. This new intimate version of Titanic opened in July 2012 at The Hangar Theatre. The production was nominated for 11 BroadwayWorld Awards which included Best Musical, Best Director, Best Choreographer, and Best Ensemble Performance. Stephenson subsequently remounted this production in hopes of an eventual Broadway revival at Westchester Broadway Theatre in Elmsford, New York in January 2014.

The US regional theater premiere of the ensemble version of the show was on October 26, 2014, at The Griffin Theatre Company in Chicago, directed by Scott Weinstein with music direction by Elizabeth Doran and choreography by Sawyer Smith. It had its amateur premier at Avon Players in Rochester Hills, Michigan on September 8, 2017.

=== Signature Theatre production ===
Arlington, Virginia's Signature Theatre presented Titanic from December 13, 2016, to January 29, 2017. "I've always loved the musical Titanic and I have felt that Signature should reinvent this musical for our audiences in an exciting new way," said the company's artistic director Eric Schaeffer in an article about the production.

=== Concert productions ===
In February 2014 most of the original Broadway cast reunited, including Michael Cerveris, Brian d'Arcy James, Martin Moran, David Garrison, David Costabile, and Becky Ann Baker for a staged concert of the musical at Lincoln Center's Avery Fisher Hall. This concert was produced by Manhattan Concert Productions and featured a chorus of 200 singers from across the country. It was conducted by original musical director, music supervisor, and conductor Kevin Stites, choreographed by Liza Gennaro, and directed by Don Stephenson.

In June 2024, there was an Off-Broadway concert at New York City Center as a part of the Encores! series. Anne Kauffman directed the production with choreography by Danny Mefford. The cast included Bonnie Milligan as Alice Beane, Chuck Cooper as Captain Edward Smith, Eddie Cooper as Henry Etches, Drew Gehling as Edgar Beane, Ramin Karimloo as Frederick Barrett, Emilie Kouatchou as Caroline Neville, Judy Kuhn as Ida Straus, Brandon Uranowitz as Bruce Ismay, Chip Zien as Isidor Straus, Lilli Cooper as Kate Murphey and Samantha Williams as Kate McGowan. The role of Frank Carlson, the passenger who misses the ship as it departs, was played by Jesse Eisenberg, Victoria Clark (who originated Alice Beane on Broadway), and David Hyde Pierce at select performances during the run.

=== International productions ===
A Dutch touring production (European premiere) opened on September 23, 2001, in Royal Theatre Carre, Amsterdam. It was also highly successful, and produced an original cast recording (sung in Dutch) as a companion to the original Broadway cast recording on RCA Records. On December 7, 2002, a German production opened in Hamburg, a copy of the Dutch production. A cast recording was made in German. A new song was written for the German production, "Drei Tage" (Three Days), but the song was not included on cast album. It was recorded and released on a German karaoke CD called Professional Playbacks: Showtunes Vol. 1.

On May 17, 2005, the Belfast Operatic Company premiered the show in Ireland in the Grand Opera House, Belfast, Northern Ireland. The Belfast Operatic Company performed the show again, in the Grand Opera House, Belfast, on the week the ship sailed, from April 10 to 14, 2012, with a special performance beginning at 11:40 pm on the Saturday night, the time which the ship hit the iceberg. Composer Maury Yeston attended two performances of the show, having flown in from New York.

The show's Canadian professional premiere was presented in Toronto, by the Toronto Civic Light Opera in February 2006, directed by Joe Cascone, in a newly imagined staging which dispensed with the "slanted set" concept of the original production. This production featured Bob Deutsch as Captain Smith, David Haines as J. Bruce Ismay, and Cory Doran as Barrett. Staged with full orchestra and 40-member cast, the run was extended twice due to popular demand.

The Australian production starring Nick Tate as Captain Smith debuted in October 2006. The same production made its UK premiere at York Theatre Royal, and its London premiere at the Gordon Craig Theatre in Stevenage.

A Japanese engagement played from January to February 2007.

The premiere in Wales was performed November 15–20, 2004, at the Gwyn Hall by Neath Amateur Operatic Society. The musical returned to Wales from April 11–14, 2012 by Spotlight Theatre Company in the Parc and Dare Hall. Directed by Pat Evans, musical direction by Geraint Bessant, the performance included a special gala event on April 14 to mark 100 years to the day the tragedy struck. The London premiere was presented by West Wickham Operatic Society between November 21–26, 2006, at The Churchill Theatre Bromley, conducted by Paul Showell.

On February 9, 2008, Ballinrobe Musical Society, under the direction of Peter Kennedy, performed the first ever production to take place in the Republic of Ireland. The show ran from February 9 to 16. Michael Coen played Captain Edward Smith.

There were French productions in Belgium in the cities of Liège and Charleroi by Stéphane Laporte and Jean-Louis Grinda from 2000 to 2006. The show premiered in Finland on March 29, 2008, in Seinäjoki City Theatre.

On April 26, 2010, the musical company Scenario premiered the show in Kolbotn, Norway. The show ran from April 26 to May 12.

In 2016, a revival of the musical was mounted at Chapel Off Chapel in Melbourne, Australia. The production was based on the ensemble version of the musical, and played for an eighteen night engagement. Directed by James Cutler, starring Don Winsor, Greta Sherriff, Jon Sebastian, and Paul Batey, it received overwhelming critical acclaim.

A production in Seoul, Korea, opened in November 2017, produced by OD Productions.

A production of Titanic was to tour in the Netherlands in the 2020/2021 season, but it was rescheduled to the 2021/2022 season because of the COVID-19 pandemic. It will be produced by De Graaf & Cornelissen Entertainment and feature René van Kooten as Thomas Andrews.

In November 2022, there was a concert production in Australia starring Anthony Warlow as Captain Smith.

Titanic has been translated into nine languages: Japanese, French, Dutch, German, Czech, Finnish and Norwegian, Korean, Hungarian, and a Danish version premiered in the Autumn of 2017.

Titanic has been produced many times in the UK and Europe in a smaller and more approachable form by serial producer Danielle Tarento. This includes productions at Southwark Playhouse (London), Charing Cross Theatre (London), Princess of Wales theatre (Toronto) and the UK and European tour.

There was a major UK tour of the show in 2023 which ran from 16 March until the 29 July. The production took place to commemorate the 10th anniversary of the show's London debut at The Southwark Playhouse. The tour opened at The Churchill Theatre, Bromley and concluded at The Liverpool Empire. This version added a new sequence in which First Officer Murdoch commits suicide out of responsibility over the disaster, and has Bree Smith playing Alice. One reviewer praised Smith's performance but felt it an “odd choice made by the casting team…I couldn’t help but initially think that in an authentic setting, a black woman would not be fangirling over people who most likely wouldn’t treat her very well. The choice doesn’t hurt (but) it can pull you out of the experience if you think too long about the era’s politics that wouldn’t have stopped and the gangplank.” (Note: The Laroche family, father Joseph and daughters Simonne and Louise, were the only known passengers of black ancestry on board the ship in real life.)

In the 2026/2027 season, Titanic was shown in the Operahouse Chemnitz in Germany. It featured the entire opera ensemble as well as 14 guest actors, the in-house Robert-Schumann-Philharmonie, the opera choir and many extras.

=== Filmed Version ===
It was announced on 13 July 2023 that a live capture of the 10th anniversary UK tour was filmed while the production played at The New Victoria Theatre, Woking from 10 to 15 July. Filming took place during normal performances of the show as well as the cast occasionally performing to an empty auditorium for certain sequences. This would have allowed the seven cameras which were used to be placed in multiple locations within the theatre. The film was shown in over 700 movie theaters across the USA in a two-day event on 4 and 8 November via Fathom Events. The production was later made available to stream on BroadwayHD on December 15, 2023. The film's first televisual broadcast came on 26 August 2024 on Sky Arts in the UK.

== Synopsis ==
=== Prologue: The Launching ===
Titanic's designer, Thomas Andrews marvels at the wondrous things mankind has accomplished ("In Every Age"); with the R.M.S. Titanic becoming the newest feat once thought impossible. Stoker Fred Barrett arrives at the dock in Southampton, amazed by the feat of engineering ("How Did They Build Titanic?"). He is joined by Lookout Frederick Fleet and wireless telegraph operator Harold Bride, and they gaze in awe at the "Ship of Dreams" ("There She Is") as the crew arrives. Bruce Ismay, Andrews, and Captain Edward Smith congratulate each other on being the owner, designer, and captain of "The Largest Moving Object" in the world. The ship's passengers arrive; the Third and Second Class passengers feel privileged to be aboard the maiden voyage of the grandest ship ever to sail ("I Must Get on that Ship"). The First Class passengers arrive; their names and achievements are narrated by Second Class passenger Alice Beane ("1st Class Roster"). The Titanic sets sail, and the assembled company wishes her a safe crossing ("Godspeed Titanic").

=== Act 1 ===
Now at sea, Ismay arrives on the bridge to inform Smith that he plans for the Titanic to arrive in New York on Tuesday afternoon rather than Wednesday morning, while Andrews insists that the maiden voyage be a safe one. As they've cleared land, Smith allows her speed to be increased slightly. Barrett, in the boiler room, disagrees with the order on such a new ship, but nonetheless complies ("Barrett's Song").

As the voyage continues, Ismay demands increasingly more speed, so the ship can build an impressive reputation. Smith complies despite Andrews' objections and warnings of icebergs in their course.

In Second Class, Alice Beane longs for the grandeur that is First Class, while her husband Edgar, a successful hardware store owner, is content with their station. Charles Clarke, who is traveling to America to become a journalist, is accompanied by his fiancée Caroline Neville. Caroline's father doesn't approve of the engagement, so they are eloping to America.

Meanwhile, in First Class, the titans of industry recount the accomplishments that man has recently achieved, with the Titanic becoming the pinnacle. ("What a Remarkable Age This Is!").

On the bridge, Smith hails 1st Officer Murdoch's qualities, deeming him ready to assume a command of his own, but Murdoch feels he is not yet ready to handle the responsibilities of the job ("To Be a Captain").

In steerage, three Irish lasses—each named Kate—dream with the rest of Third Class of the opportunities that await them in America ("Lady's Maid"). Kate McGowan is smitten with a young man traveling with them, Jim Farrell.

In the wireless room, Bride is overwhelmed by the passengers' personal messages to be sent, though he finds time to handle Barrett's proposal to his girlfriend ("The Proposal/The Night Was Alive").

On Sunday morning, the First Class attends religious services ("God Lift Me Up"), then dances on deck to "The Latest Rag". Alice Beane has managed to infiltrate their ranks, though she is turned away several times by an alert steward. Edgar finds her and the two argue over their lifestyle choices ("I Have Danced"). As evening draws near, the temperature drops, and lookout Fleet finds the weather conditions difficult for spotting icebergs ("No Moon"). On deck, Kate McGowan tells Farrell that she needs to marry as she is carrying the child of a married man, and he accepts. Elderly passengers Isidor and Ida Straus discuss their plans for the years to come while Charlotte Drake Cardoza scandalizes the First Class men by joining them for cards in the First Class Smoke Room ("Autumn").

Suddenly, Fleet spots an iceberg and alerts the bridge. Murdoch, who's the senior officer on the bridge, takes evasive action, but the Titanic strikes the iceberg.

=== Act 2 ===
The stewards begin waking the confused passengers, while they themselves do not have much information ("Wake Up, Wake Up"). Capt. Smith arrives on the bridge and is briefed on the situation. He orders all passengers to put on life vests, for Bride to begin sending distress messages, and for Andrews to inspect the damage. Andrews informs Smith and Ismay that the damage inflicted is more than the ship is designed to endure and that the ship will sink, reminding them that there are only enough lifeboats for less than half of the people aboard.

In the First Class Dining Salon, passengers refuse to believe that anything is wrong with the ship and are annoyed at being awakened in the middle of the night ("Dressed in Your Pyjamas in the Grand Salon"). Crew members are assuring them that there is no reason to panic. No one is aware of the ship's growing peril until a food cart rolls on its own, showing the ship's growing tilt. All the passengers and crew members quickly hurry to the lifeboats.

In Third Class, the three Kates and Farrell attempt to find a way up to boat deck, but are unable to until they are assisted by Barrett ("The Staircase"). Smith arrives in the radio room where Bride informs him that only the Carpathia is near enough to help, but is unable to arrive until after the Titanic has sunk. Smith, Andrews, and Ismay argue over responsibility for the disaster ("The Blame").

Women and children are ordered into the lifeboats, while the men are forced to stay behind ("To the Lifeboats"). Murdoch orders Fleet and Barrett into the last lifeboat to help man the oars, but Barrett doesn't know how to row a boat and lets Farrell, who can row, into the boat instead. Barrett bids farewell to his absent girlfriend while the rest of the passengers do the same to their loved ones ("We'll Meet Tomorrow").

The bellboy tells the captain that all the life boats have been launched, and that those remaining aboard accept their fate. Murdoch tells the Captain that he takes full responsibility for the accident, but Smith forgives him and then laments on how he had gone his entire career without experiencing any accident. Henry Etches, the first class steward, says a prayer ("To Be A Captain" (Reprise)). Isidor and Ida Straus (Ida had refused to leave her husband behind) affirm their long-lasting love for one another ("Still"). As the Captain declares the ship officially lost, Andrews—life vest unworn—remains in the first-class smoking room, obsessing over the ship's plans. He visualizes redesigning her, as well as the final moments for the passengers before the ship sinks beneath the waves ("Mr. Andrews' Vision").

In the early hours of the morning, the survivors are rescued by the Carpathia. Many of them recount the tragedy of the Titanic, mourning the loss of people and ship. Bride and Ismay, along with several of the survivors, discuss the possibilities that could have prevented the disaster ("The Foundering"). The survivors express hope that they will one day be reunited with their lost loved ones and abandoned dreams ("In Every Age/Finale").

== Musical numbers ==
Act I

- "Overture" – Orchestra
- "Prologue: In Every Age" – Andrews
- "The Launching: How Did They Build Titanic?" – Barrett
- "The Launching: Fare-thee-well" – Barrett, Bride & Fleet
- "The Launching: There She Is" – Barrett, Bride, Fleet, Hartley, Sailor, Stoker, Stevedore, Pitman, Lightholler, Hitchens, Murdoch, Smith, Bellboy, Ensemble
- "The Launching: The Largest Floating Object in The World" – Ismay, Andrews & Smith
- "The Launching: I Must Get On That Ship" – Pitman, Kate McGowan, Kate Mullins, Kate Murphey, Charles, Edgar, Caroline, Alice, Ensemble
- "The Launching: The First Class Roster" – Pitman and Alice
- "The Launching: Godspeed Titanic" – Pitman & Company
- "Barrett's Song (The screws are turning)" – Barrett
- "What A Remarkable Age This Is" – Etches, 1st-Class Passengers, Servants
- "To Be A Captain" – Murdoch
- "Lady's Maid" – Kate McGowan, Kate Mullins, Kate Murphey, Ensemble
- "I Give You My Hand" – Charles Clarke and Caroline Neville
- "The Proposal" / "The Night Was Alive" – Barrett & Bride
- "God Lift Me Up (Hymn)" – 1st-Class passengers
- "Doing The Latest Rag" – Hartley, Bricoux, Taylor, Ensemble
- "I Have Danced" – Alice & Edgar
- "No Moon" – Fleet & Company
- "Autumn" – Hartley
- Finale Act One – Company

Act II

- "Entr'acte" – Orchestra
- "Wake Up, Wake Up!" – Etches, Stewards, 1st-, 2nd-, & 3rd-class passengers*
- "Dressed In Your Pyjamas In the Grand Salon" – Company
- "The Staircase" – The Three Kates, Farrell, Barrett*
- "The Blame" – Ismay, Andrews & Smith
- "To the Lifeboats" – Company
- "We'll Meet Tomorrow" – Barrett, Clarke, & Company
- "To Be A Captain" (Reprise) – Etches
- "Still" – Ida & Isidor
- "Mr. Andrews' Vision" – Andrews
- "The Foundering" – Bride & Survivors*
- Finale – "In Every Age" / "Godspeed, Titanic" (Reprise) – Company

*Not included in the cast recording

== Instrumentation ==
In addition to the cast of forty three performers on stage, Jonathan Tunick orchestrated Yeston's score for the original production for 26 musicians in the pit. For the original cast album, the instrumentation was augmented to 38 musicians.

- Strings: 6 Violins, 2 Viola, 2 Cello, 1 Double Bass
- Brass: 2 Trumpets, 2 Horns, 2 Trombones
- Keyboards: 2 synthesizer keyboards
- Woodwinds: Reed 1: Flute, Bb Clarinet, Piccolo, Alto Flute
- Reed 2: Oboe, English Horn
- Reed 3: Clarinet
- Reed 4: Flute, Clarinet
- Reed 5: Bassoon, and E♭ Contrabass Clarinet (or Bassoon)
- Percussion: (2 Players) 1- mallet instruments (Timpani, Tubular bells, Xylophone, Gran cassa, etc.) 1 trap set (Snare drum, Cymbals)

== Cast and characters ==
Character	Broadway	First U.S. National Tour	City Center Encores
Character	1997	1999	2024
Crew and staff aboard the RMS Titanic
Captain Edward Smith	John Cunningham	William Parry	Chuck Cooper
1st Officer William Murdoch	David Costabile	David Pittu	Adam Chanler-Berat
2nd Officer Charles Lightoller	John Bolton	John Leone	Michael Maliakel
3rd Officer Herbert Pitman	Matthew Bennett	Raymond Sage	Daniel Beeman
4th Officer Joseph Boxhall	Andy Taylor	Ken Triwush	Brandon Contreras
Chief Engineer Joseph Bell	Ted Sperling	Bruce Thompson	Matthew Scott
Harold Bride, Radioman	Martin Moran	Dale Sandish	Alex Joseph Grayson
Frederick Fleet, Lookout	David Elder	Timothy J. Alex	Nathan Salstone
Frederick Barrett, Stoker	Brian d’Arcy James	Brian d’Arcy James	Ramin Karimloo
Robert Hichens, Quartermaster	Adam Alexi-Malle	Matthew Yang King	Daniel Torres
Henry Etches, 1st Class Steward	Allan Corduner	Edward Conery	Eddie Cooper
Stewardess Hutchinson	Stephanie Park	Jennifer Waldman	
Stewardess Robinson	Michele Ragusa	Kristi Barber	
Bellboy	Mara Stephens	Rebecca Lowman	Ari Notartomaso
Bandmaster Wallace Hartley	Ted Sperling	Bruce Thompson	Matthew Scott
Bandsman Bricoux	Adam Alexi-Malle	Matthew Yang King	Daniel Torres
Bandsman Taylor	Andy Taylor		Brandon Contreras
1st Class
Bruce Ismay, director of the White Star Line	David Garrison	Adam Heller	Brandon Uranowitz
Thomas Andrews, the designer of the ship	Michael Cerveris	Kevin Gray	Jose Llana
John Jacob Astor	William Youmans	Rob Donohoe	Evan Harrington
Madeline Astor	Lisa Datz	Joann Merhaut	Leslie Donna Flesner
Mme. Aubert	Kimberly Hester	Carole Denise	Ali Ewoldt
Charlotte Drake Cardoza (based on Charlotte Drake Cardeza)	Becky Ann Baker	Margo Skinner	Ashley Blanchet
Edith Corse Evans	Mindy Cooper	Sarah Solie Shannon	Amy Justman
Benjamin Guggenheim	Joseph Kolinski	Ken Krugman	Timothy McDevitt
Isidor Straus	Larry Keith	S. Marc Jordan	Chip Zien
Ida Straus	Alma Cuervo	Tiana Elg	Judy Kuhn
John B. Thayer	Michael Mulheren	Bob Lauder Jr.	Kent Overshown
Jack Thayer	Charles McAteer	Kristi Barber	
Marian Thayer	Robin Irwin	Stacie James	Lindsay Roberts
George Widener	Henry Stram	Michael Shelle	Matthew Scott
Eleanor Widener	Jody Gelb	Laura Kenyon	Leah Horowitz
J. H. Rogers	Andy Taylor	Ken Triwush	Brandon Contreras
The Major	Matthew Bennett	Raymond Sage	Daniel Torres
2nd Class
Edgar Beane (based on Edward Beane)	Bill Buell	David Beditz	Drew Gehling
Alice Beane (based on Ethel Beane)	Victoria Clark	Liz McConahay	Bonnie Milligan
Charles Clarke	Don Stephenson	Philip Lehl	A.J. Shively
Caroline Neville (based on Ada Maria Clarke)	Judith Blazer	Christianne Tisdale	Emilie Kouatchou
3rd Class
Kate McGowan	Jennifer Piech	Melissa Bell	Samantha Williams
Kate Murphey	Theresa McCarthy	Kate Suber	Lilli Cooper
Kate Mullins	Erin Hill	Jodi Jinks	Ashley Blanchet
Jim Farrell	Clarke Thorell	Richard Roland	Andrew Durand
On Shore
Frank Carlson	Henry Stram	Michael Shelle	

== Awards and nominations ==
=== Original Broadway production ===
Year	Award	Category	Nominee	Result
1997	Tony Award	Best Musical		Won
1997	Tony Award	Best Book of a Musical	Peter Stone	Won
1997	Tony Award	Best Original Score	Maury Yeston	Won
1997	Tony Award	Best Scenic Design	Stewart Laing	Won
1997	Tony Award	Best Orchestrations	Jonathan Tunick	Won
1997	Drama Desk Award	Outstanding Orchestrations	Jonathan Tunick	Won
1997	Drama League Award	Distinguished Production of a Musical		Nominated
1997	Outer Critics Circle Award	Outstanding New Broadway Musical		Nominated
1997	Outer Critics Circle Award	Outstanding Director of a Musical	Richard Jones	Nominated
1997	Outer Critics Circle Award	Outstanding Costume Design	Stewart Laing	Nominated
1997	Outer Critics Circle Award	Outstanding Set Design	Stewart Laing	Nominated
1997	Outer Critics Circle Award	Outstanding Lighting Design	Paul Gallo	Nominated
1997	Grammy Award	Best Musical Show Album		Nominated
