= The Importance of Being Earnest (opera) =

Opera by Gerald Barry based on the play by Oscar Wilde

- Opera by Gerald Barry
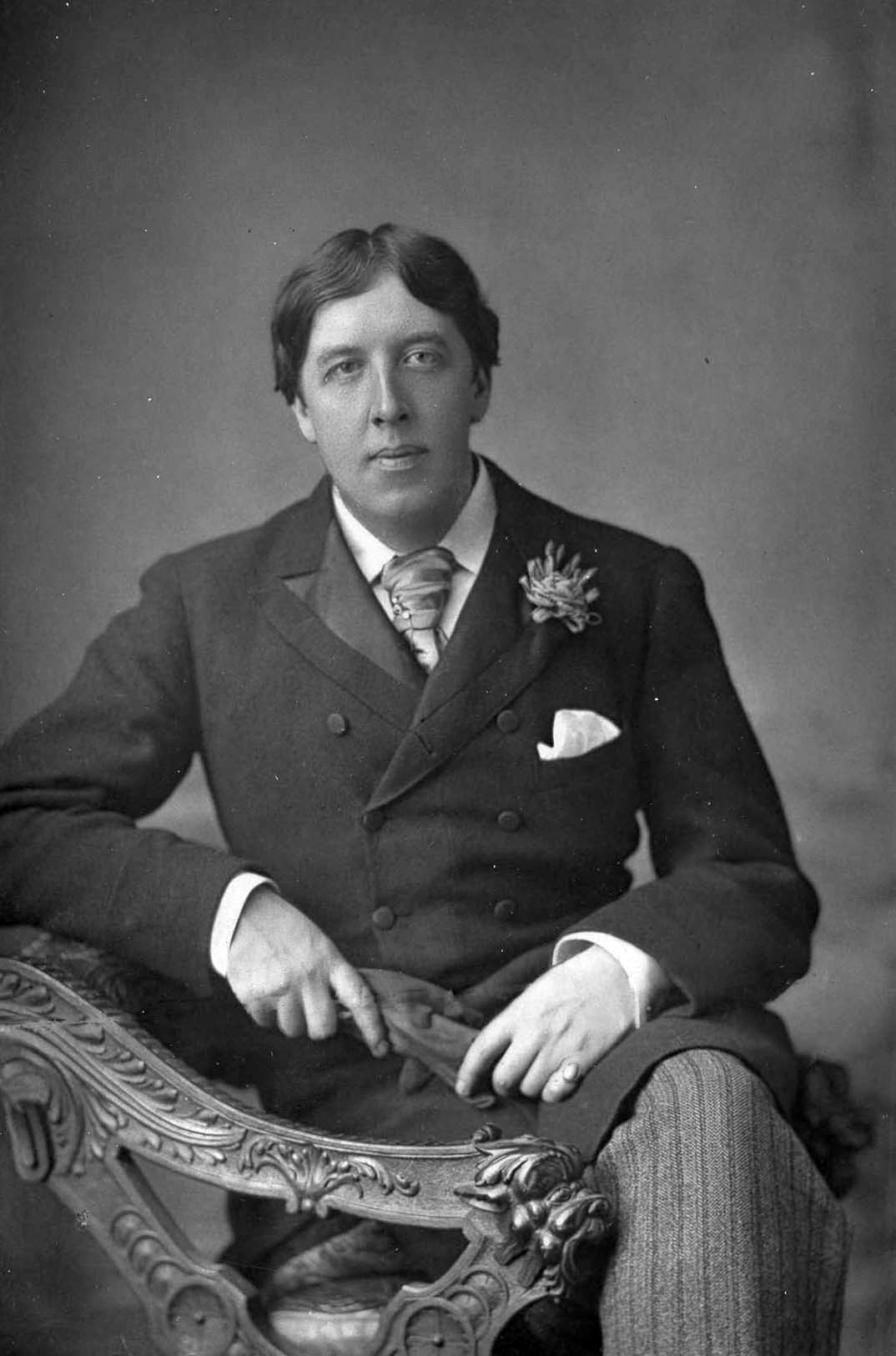
- Oscar Wilde, author of the original play The Importance of Being Earnest
- Librettist: Gerald Barry
- Language: English
- Based on: The Importance of Being Earnest by Oscar Wilde
- Premiere: 17 March 2013; Opéra national de Lorraine, Nancy, France

The Importance of Being Earnest is a three-act opera by Irish composer Gerald Barry based on the 1895 play of the same name by Oscar Wilde. The opera was given concert performances in Los Angeles in 2011 and in London and Birmingham in 2012, and received its first fully staged performances in 2013 at the Opéra national de Lorraine, Nancy. Its first British staged performance took place at the Linbury Studio Theatre, Covent Garden, in 2013.

== Background ==
The opera was commissioned jointly by the Los Angeles Philharmonic and the Barbican Centre, and was completed by the composer in eight months. Barry himself adapted the libretto from the original play, cutting the text substantially. However, Wilde's plot is retained completely, as well as many of his most famous lines. The composer has commented: "The text was far too long, and I had to cut around two-thirds of it, but the structure is so strong that I think people will hardly notice. I got rid of all the social niceties, which gives a different tone—the butler is not so polite as he was!" In describing his technique, the composer has further said in respect of act 3:

Everyone's on stage, terrible scandals have been revealed about Miss Prism and the baby, and Canon Chasuble comes in and says "Everything is ready for the christening." Everyone just responds with weird vocal slides, there's no text at all. He responds by saying, "Your mood seems peculiarly secular" and they do it all again, as if they're animals in a menagerie. I was very pleased with that, I thought "I've matched Wilde in madness"

Concert performances of the opera were given in Los Angeles in April 2011 conducted by Thomas Adès, and in London (26 April 2012) and Birmingham (28 April 2012), the English performances being given by the Birmingham Contemporary Music Group, also conducted by Adès. The opera was given its first staged performances on 17 March 2013 at the Opéra national de Lorraine in Nancy, directed by Sam Brown and conducted by Tito Muñoz, and in June 2013 at the Royal Opera House's Linbury Studio Theatre, the Britten Sinfonia conducted by Tim Murray, with Stephanie Marshall as Gwendolyn and Hilary Summers reprising her Miss Prism from Los Angeles. In October and November 2013 a touring production of the opera was given in Derry, Belfast, Cork and Dublin by Northern Ireland Opera, conducted by Pierre-André Valade. In April and May 2019, a new production staged by Julien Chavaz and conducted by Jérôme Kuhn at the Nouvel Opéra Fribourg (Fribourg, Switzerland) and the Théâtre de l'Athénée (Paris) presented its Swiss and Paris premiere with Graeme Danby as Lady Bracknell, Ed Ballard as Algernon, Timur Bekbosunov as John Worthing, Nina van Essen as Gwendolen and Alison Scherzer as Cecily.

== Roles ==
Roles, voice types, casts of concert and staged premieres
Role	Voice type	Premiere concert performance April 2011 Los Angeles Philharmonic Conductor: Thomas Adès	Premiere staging 17 March 2013 Opéra national de Lorraine Conductor: Tito Muñoz
Algernon Moncrieff	baritone	Joshua Bloom	Phillip Addis
John Worthing	tenor	Gordon Gietz	Chad Shelton
Gwendolyn Fairfax	mezzo-soprano	Katalin Károlyi	Wendy Dawn Thompson
Lady Bracknell	bass	Stephen Richardson	Alan Ewing
Miss Prism	contralto	Hilary Summers	Diana Montague
Cecily Cardew	soprano	Hila Plitmann	Ida Falk Winland
The Rev. Canon Chasuble D.D.	Spoken role	Matthew Anchel	Steven Beard
Butler	bass	Adam Lau	José Luis Barreto

== Synopsis ==
The following synopsis is based on the Royal Opera House production, 2016.

Time: The present

=== Act 1 ===
Algernon Moncrieff's flat in London

Algernon is playing his own variations on Auld Lang Syne on the piano while his butler prepares afternoon tea. John "Jack" Worthing, whom Algernon knows as Ernest, arrives. 'Ernest' has come from the country to propose to Algernon's cousin, Gwendolen Fairfax. Algernon, however, refuses his consent until 'Ernest' explains why his cigarette case bears the inscription "From little Cecily, with her fondest love to her dear Uncle Jack." 'Ernest' is forced to admit to living a double life. In the country, he assumes a serious attitude for the benefit of his young ward Cecily, goes by the name of John or Jack, and pretends that he has a wastrel younger brother named Ernest in London. In the city, meanwhile, he assumes the identity of the libertine Ernest. Algernon confesses to a similar deception: he pretends to have an invalid friend named Bunbury in the country, whom he can "visit" whenever he wishes to avoid an unwelcome social obligation.

Gwendolen and her formidable mother Lady Bracknell (sung by a male bass) call on Algernon. Asserting the superiority of German music over French, Lady Bracknell gives a rendition of Friedrich Schiller's Ode to Joy. Jack proposes to Gwendolen. She accepts, but seems to love him mostly because of his professed name of Ernest. Jack resolves to himself that he will be rechristened "Ernest". Lady Bracknell interviews Jack to assess his worthiness as a suitor for Gwendolen. Horrified to learn that Jack was adopted after being discovered as a baby in a handbag at Victoria Station, she forbids him further contact with her daughter. Gwendolen manages to secretly promise Jack her undying love. As Jack gives her his address in the country, Algernon surreptitiously notes it.

=== Act 2 ===
The garden of John Worthing's estate

Cecily is studying with her governess, Miss Prism, who extols the German language, also giving a rendition of the Ode to Joy. Algernon arrives, pretending to be Ernest Worthing, and soon charms Cecily. Long fascinated by her Uncle Jack's mysterious black sheep brother, she is predisposed to fall for Algernon in his role of Ernest (a name she, like Gwendolen, is apparently particularly fond of). Therefore, Algernon, too, plans for the rector, Dr. Chasuble, to rechristen him "Ernest". Meanwhile, Jack has decided to abandon his double life. He arrives and announces his brother's death in Paris, a story immediately undermined by Algernon's presence in the guise of Ernest. Gwendolen now enters. During the temporary absence of the two men, she meets Cecily, and each woman indignantly declares that she is the one engaged to "Ernest". The atmosphere between the two (in a dialogue effected via megaphones) grows chillier, accompanied in the orchestra by the rhythmic demolition of a stack of dinner plates. When Jack and Algernon reappear, their deceptions are exposed; they immediately quarrel about each other's disastrous 'Bunburying'.

=== Act 3 ===
The morning-room of Worthing's estate

The girls forgive the men on learning that they are both prepared to undergo re-christening on their behalf. Arriving in pursuit of her daughter, Lady Bracknell is astonished to learn that Algernon and Cecily are engaged. The revelation of Cecily's fortune (£130,000) soon dispels Lady Bracknell's initial doubts over the young lady's suitability, but then Jack announces that, as Cecily's guardian, he forbids her engagement. Jack will consent to Cecily's marriage only if Lady Bracknell agrees to his own union with Gwendolen—something she declines to do. The impasse is broken when Lady Bracknell hears mention of Miss Prism, and recognises her as the person who, twenty-eight years earlier, as a family nursemaid, had taken a baby boy for a walk in a perambulator and never returned. Challenged, Miss Prism explains that she had absent-mindedly put the manuscript of a novel she was writing in the perambulator, and the baby in a handbag, which she had left at Victoria Station.

Jack produces the very same handbag, proving that he is the lost baby, whom Lady Bracknell identifies as the elder son of her late sister, and thus Algernon's elder brother after all. Having acquired such respectable relations, he is now acceptable as a suitor for Gwendolen. Lady Bracknell informs Jack that, as the first-born, he would have been named after his father, General Moncrieff. The cast examines the Army Lists (via mobile phones) and discovers that his father's name—and hence his own real name—is in fact Ernest. Lady Bracknell complains to her newfound relative: "My nephew, you seem to be displaying signs of triviality." "On the contrary, Aunt Augusta", he replies, "I've now realised for the first time in my life the vital importance of being Earnest."

== Reception ==
The actor Stephen Fry commented that making an opera setting of Wilde's play was like "taking a machete to a soufflé". However, critical reception of the opera has been generally very positive. The Los Angeles Times wrote of the staged premiere "The world now has something rare: a new genuinely comic opera and maybe the most inventive Oscar Wilde opera since Richard Strauss's Salome more than a century ago". Ninfea Cruttwell-Reade noted the climax to the confrontation of Cicely and Gwendolyn when the latter

proceeded to attack her tea-companion with acerbic remarks while 40 dinner plates were systematically demolished by a percussionist on the off-beats. This "ostinato" for fractured china made a fabulous din, and was a masterstroke on Barry's part. Other noteworthy moments were the merry jigs danced by Ernest ... and Lady Bracknell as they disputed the validity of his marriage proposal, and the serial duet sung by Algernon and Ernest about cucumber sandwiches.

Matthew Rye commented on the 2016 London production

Barry deliberately and constantly subverts our expectations, transcending the original and creating something completely new. He gets through acres of Wilde's text ... in almost patter style and to motoric regular rhythms that play against word stress and meaning; and then he sets the most mundane of phrases such as “They have been eating muffins” to extravagant melismas.

The opera won the Royal Philharmonic Society award for large-scale composition in 2012. In 2019, writers of The Guardian ranked it the 11th greatest work of art music since 2000, with Andrew Clements writing that it "brilliantly captures the play’s absurdities while adding a layer of surrealism that is entirely Barry’s own."

== Recording ==
A recording of the 2012 London concert performance of the opera was issued by NMC Records in 2014, and was nominated for a 2016 Grammy Award.
