= Jacob Clemente =

American actor and dancer

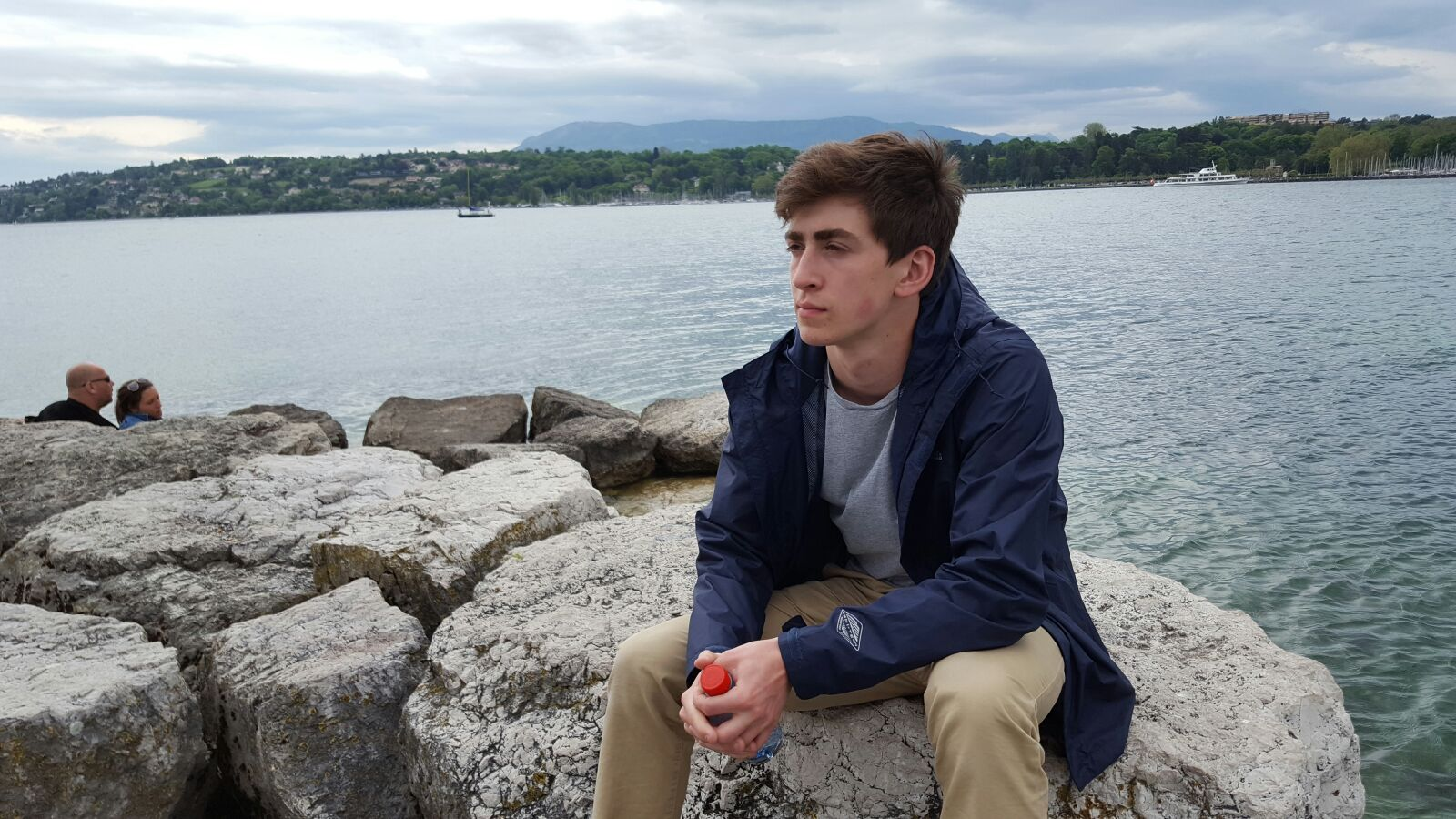
- Jacob Clemente on tour with the Yale Alley Cats in Geneva
- Born: Jacob Clemente; April 12, 1997 (age 28); North Greenbush, New York
- Years active: 2006–present
- Website: Official Website

Jacob Clemente (born April 12, 1997) is an American actor and dancer. He is best known for his portrayal of "Billy" in the Broadway production of Billy Elliot: The Musical.

Clemente was born in North Greenbush, New York, on April 12, 1997. He began his study of dance in Colonie, New York, at The World of Dance.

Clemente appeared in regional theatre productions as a boy, including Toy Camp, The Music Man, High School Musical on Stage!, and Seussical. He also participated in dance competitions including with The New York City Dance Alliance (NYCDA).

In 2008, Clemente auditioned for the revival production of Gypsy, starring Patti Lupone. On September 2, he became a replacement in the cast as a "Boy Scout", making his Broadway debut at the age of 11. He remained with the show until it closed on January 11, 2009.

After successfully auditioning for the Broadway production of Billy Elliot: The Musical, Clemente appeared as the "Tall/Posh Boy" and was the understudy for "Michael." His second performance as "Tall/Posh Boy" was on October 3, 2009, which was the final performance of Kiril Kulish, the Tony Award-winning Broadway preview night Billy.

On April 3, 2010, Clemente became the ninth actor to play the role of "Billy" in the Broadway production of Billy Elliot the Musical. He performed the role for the final time on July 3, 2011.

In 2010, Clemente participated with other Broadway stars in recording the song "It Gets Better," to benefit the Trevor Project. The song was released on iTunes October 19, 2010.

At CES 2011, Clemente played the host character Zoll for the Samsung keynote.

Clemente attended Columbia High School in East Greenbush, New York. In 2015, Clemente began attending Yale College, where he double-majored in Russian and economics. He is a member of a number of performing groups on campus, including the Yale Alley Cats.

== Credits ==
=== Stage ===
Date	Production	Role	Theatre
December 15–17, 2006	Toy Camp	Jig	Capital Area Productions
February 2–4, 2007	High School Musical on Stage!	Party Kid (ensemble)	Capital Area Productions
November 15–18, 2007	The Music Man	Winthrop	Schenectady Light Opera
September 2, 2008 - January 11, 2009	Gypsy	Boy Scout	St. James Theatre
June 10–18, 2010	Seussical	Haree (Wickersham #2)	Cohoes Music Hall
April 3, 2010 - July 3, 2011	Billy Elliot: The Musical	Billy	Imperial Theatre
October 2, 2009 - November 15, 2009	Billy Elliot: The Musical	Tall/Posh Boy, Understudy: Michael	Imperial Theatre
June 6, 2011	Camelot Benefit Concert	Tom of Warwick	Shubert Theatre

=== Film ===
Date	Production	Role	Notes
2012	The Prize Guys		Pre-Production
2012	Max's Fantastic Adventures - The Well of Lost Souls	Harry	Pre-Production

== Awards ==
- NYCDA National Mini Outstanding Dancer 2008
- 1st Place Junior Division PrimeTime Albany, NY Regional 2008
- NYCDA Boston Regional Mini Outstanding Dancer Dec. 2007
- Junior Mr. Starquest, World Finals, Virginia Beach 2007
- NYCDA Regionals Outstanding Dancer Runner-up 2007
- Regional Petite Mr. Starquest, Albany, NY 2007
- 2nd Runner Up, Dance Xplosion National Mini Mister Title, July 2006
