= Stephanie Marshall =

Canadian operatic mezzo-soprano

Stephanie Marshall is a Canadian operatic mezzo-soprano.

Marshall was educated at the Schulich School of Music of McGill University, Montreal, and at the Royal Academy of Music in London, where she was awarded the Queen's Commendation for Excellence.

Marshall is a company principal at the English National Opera in London and made her Royal Opera debut in 2013 as "Gwendolen Fairfax" in The Importance of Being Earnest. She has sung in concert with orchestras including The Hallé, English Chamber Orchestra, Britten Sinfonia and the BBC Symphony Orchestra. Marshal is also a winner of the Kathleen Ferrier Award.

== Opera ==
Marshall's roles include:

- Cherubino in Mozart's The Marriage of Figaro at the English National Opera (ENO)
- Annio in Mozart's La Clemenza di Tito at the ENO
- The Handmaid in Phyllida Lloyd's The Handmaid′s Tale (ENO and Canadian Opera Company)
- Kasturbai in Philip Glass's Satyagraha (ENO)
- Nancy in Benjamin Britten's Albert Herring (Pacific Opera Victoria).
- Gwendolen in The Importance of Being Earnest (Royal Opera House)
- Wellgunde in Wagner's Der Ring des Nibelungen (ENO)
- Sonya in Prokofiev's War and Peace (ENO)
- Erika in Samuel Barber's Vanessa (Pacific Opera Victoria).
- Mercédès in Bizet's Carmen (ENO)
- Susannah in Matthew Herbert's The Crackle (Royal Opera House)
- Girl in Kurt Weill's The Rise and Fall of the City of Mahagonny (Royal Opera House)

== Recordings ==
- Gerald Barry - The Bitter Tears of Petra Von Kant; RTÉ National Symphony Orchestra, Gerhard Markson (conductor). Label: Discovery Music & Vision)

== Awards ==
- 2001 Kathleen Ferrier Memorial Prize
