= The Bitter Tears of Petra von Kant (opera) =

Opera

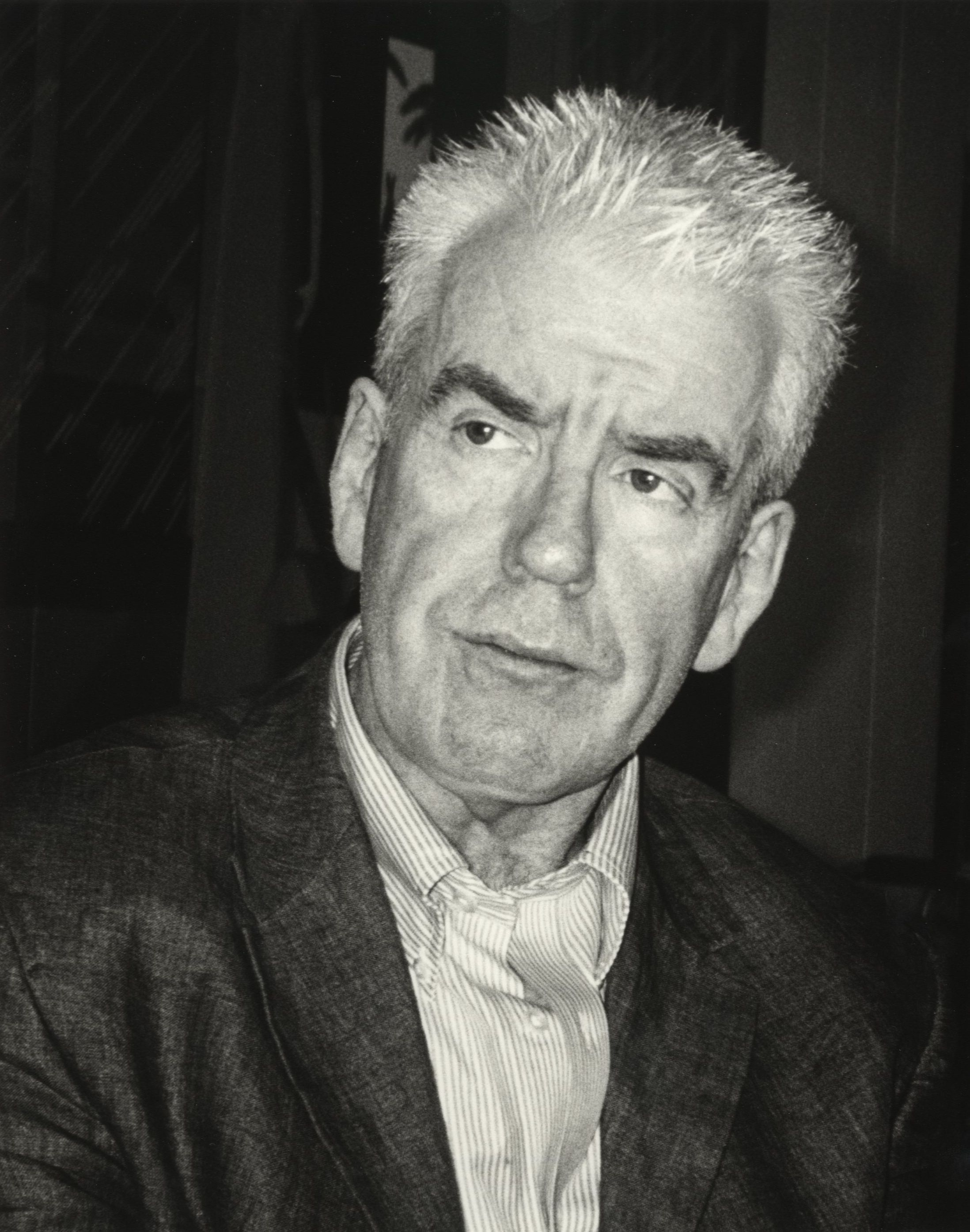
Gerald Barry in 2007

The Bitter Tears of Petra von Kant is an opera in five acts composed by Gerald Barry to a libretto in English by Denis Calandra closely based on Rainer Werner Fassbinder's screenplay for the film of the same name. Co-commissioned by Raidió Teilifís Éireann and English National Opera, it premiered in concert version in Dublin on 27 May 2005, before premiering in its fully staged version at the English National Opera in London on 16 September 2005. The opera's German-language premiere took place at Basel Opera on 4 May 2008.

The opera, which recounts a destructive lesbian affair, has an all-female cast. The title role in its ENO premiere was sung by Stephanie Friede. Susan Bickley sang the role of her friend Sidonie von Grasenabb. The production was conducted by André de Ridder and directed by Richard Jones.

== Aus Die bitteren Tränen der Petra von Kant ==
On 2 June 2022 the Berlin Philharmonic Orchestra premiered Aus Die bitteren Tränen der Petra von Kant, a concerto for double-bass by Barry, based on his music for the opera, commissioned by the orchestra for the leader of its double-bass section, Matthew McDonald. The music of the concerto is a representation of a scene in Fassbinder's film, in which Petra falls in love with Karin and invites her to live with her.
