= James Bohanek =

American actor

- Occupation(s): Stage, television actor, singer

James Bohanek is a former actor who debuted on Broadway as Armand in The Scarlet Pimpernel.

Bohanek grew up in Staten Island, New York, and attended Stuyvesant High School in Manhattan. At Yale University, he sang with the Yale Alley Cats and later sang with and was the business manager for the Whiffenpoofs before graduating in 1991. He appeared off-Broadway in Floyd Collins and Dream True. Bohanek guest-starred in a 1999 episode of Law & Order entitled "Hunters". In the late 1990s, Bohanek performed with a vocal group called Five Floor Monica.

Bohanek worked as a teacher in Edward R. Murrow High School in the Midwood section of Brooklyn, New York, from fall 2001 to spring 2006. He taught Introduction to Law, Advanced Placement American History and American History and was involved in student performances.

He currently works as a drama teacher at Durham Academy, an independent school in North Carolina, directing two shows a year.
