= Alice's Adventures Under Ground (opera) =

2016 one-act opera by Gerald Barry

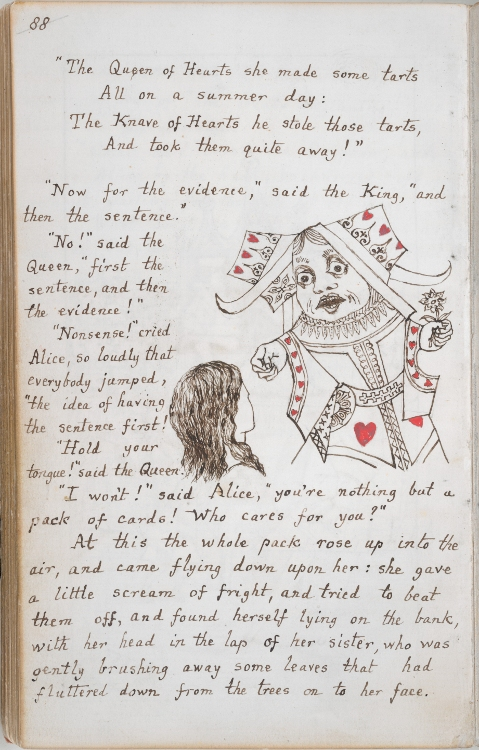
Page from the original manuscript copy of Alice's Adventures Under Ground, 1864, held in the British Library

Alice's Adventures Under Ground is a 2016 one-act opera by Gerald Barry to his own libretto, based on Lewis Carroll's 1865 children's book Alice's Adventures in Wonderland (the original manuscript of which had the title of Alice's Adventures Under Ground) and its 1871 sequel Alice Through the Looking-Glass. First performed in a concert staging at the Walt Disney Concert Hall, Los Angeles on 22 November 2016 (a performance repeated with the same cast and conductor, Thomas Adès, at the Barbican Centre in London a few days later), it received its stage premiere at the Royal Opera House on 3 February 2020. The staging was a joint production by the Royal Opera House, Irish National Opera and Dutch National Opera, and was directed by Antony McDonald.

The 54 roles in the opera are sung by a cast of seven.

== Roles ==
Role	Voice type	Concert premieres Walt Disney Concert Hall / Barbican Centre November 2016 Conductor: Thomas Adès	Stage premiere Royal Opera House 3 February 2020 Conductor: Thomas Adès (double cast)
Alice	soprano	Barbara Hannigan	Jennifer France / Claudia Boyle
Red Queen/Queen of Hearts/Duchess; Mock Turtle/Passenger1/Oyster1	mezzo-soprano	Allison Cook	Allison Cook / Clare Presland
Red Knight/Humpty Dumpty/King of Hearts; Bottle 4/Cake 4/Baby 4/Oyster 4 Passenger 6/Daisy 4	bass	Joshua Bloom	Alan Ewing / Joshua Bloom
Dormouse/White Queen/Tiger-Lily/Mock Turtle; Cook/Passenger 2/Oyster2	contralto	Hilary Summers	Carole Wilson / Hilary Summers
White Rabbit/White King/Mad Hatter; Tweedledum/Frog Footman/Fawn/Bottle 1 Cake 2/Baby 1/Passenger 3/Daisy 1	tenor	Allan Clayton	Nicky Spence / Sam Furness
White Knight/Cheshire Cat/Soldier/Bottle 3 Cake 3/Baby 3/Oyster 3/Passenger 5/Daisy 3	baritone	Mark Stone	Stephen Richardson / Mark Stone
March Hare/Tweedledee/Fish Footman/Guard; Messenger/Bottle 2/Cake 1/Baby 2 Passenger 4/Daisy 2	tenor	Peter Tantsits	Robert Murray / Peter Tantsits
Lewis Carroll	(silent role)		Lukas Hunt
Lorina Riddell	(silent role)		Bianca Hopkins
Edith Riddell	(silent role)		Eloise Hymas

== Synopsis ==
The following synopsis is in accordance with the Royal Opera House production, 2020.

The opera, which is in a single act and lasts for just under an hour, is a sequence of episodes or parts of episodes from both Alice's Adventures in Wonderland and Alice Through the Looking-Glass. It begins with Alice falling through the Rabbit Hole and meeting many of the characters of the first book, including the White Rabbit, the Mad Hatter, the Mock Turtle and the King, Queen and Knave of Hearts. Some of the poetry from the books also features, including "Jabberwocky" which is sung in versions in Russian (to the tune of "It's a Long Way to Tipperary"), French and German. Moving to Looking Glass Land, Alice moves across the chessboard, meeting among others Humpty Dumpty and Tweedledum and Tweedledee, becoming a queen when she reaches the eighth square.
