= Martin Moran (actor) =

American novelist

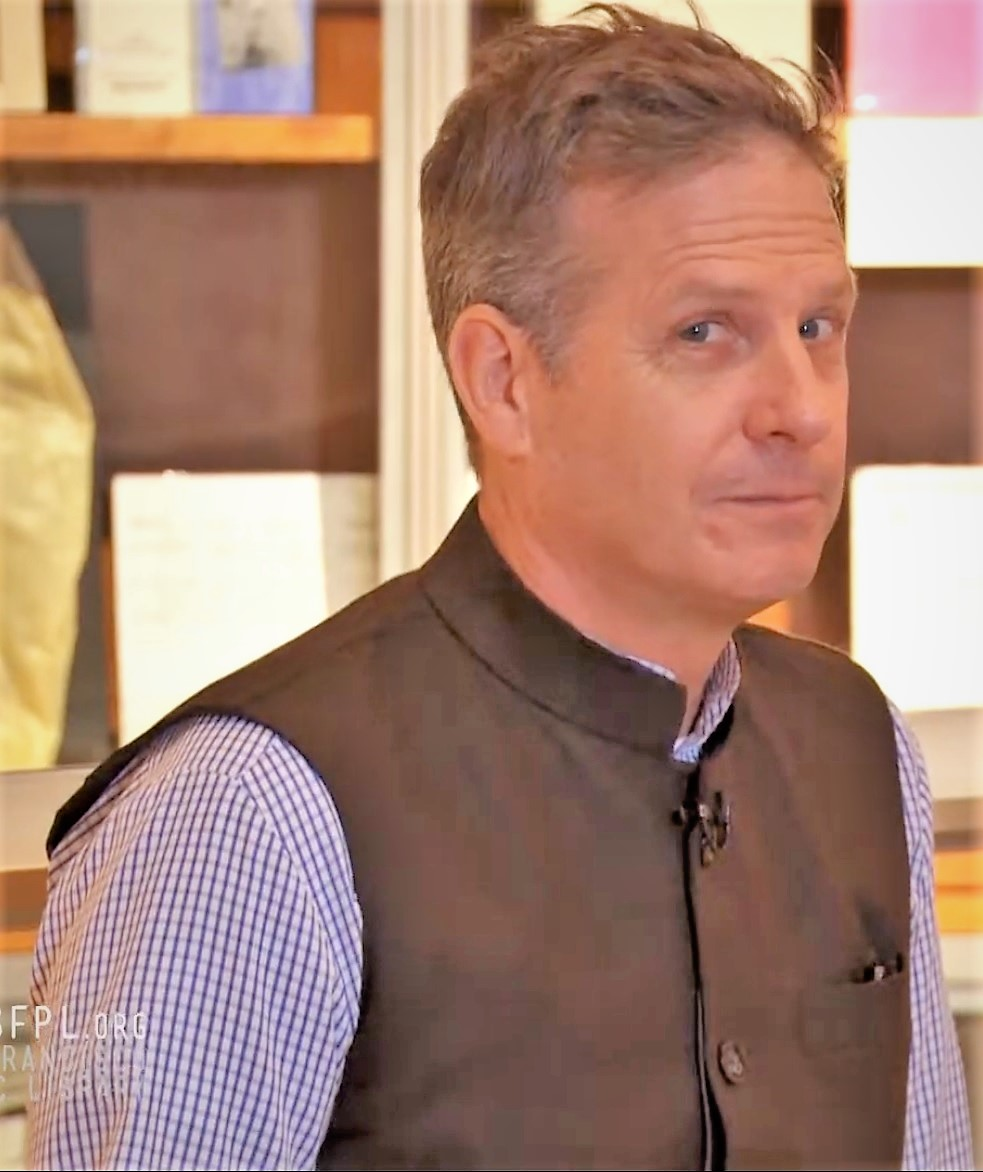
- Moran at the San Francisco Public Library in 2016
- Born: December 29, 1959 (age 66)
- Education: Stanford University
- Occupations: Actor; writer
- Website: www.alltherageplay.com

Martin Moran (born December 29, 1959) is an American actor and writer who grew up in Denver, Colorado.

He attended Stanford University and is best known for his autobiographical solo show about his childhood molestation called The Tricky Part, for which he won an Obie Award and received two Drama Desk Award nominations. In 1999, Moran gave his final Broadway performance as radioman Harold Bride in a musical called Titanic, but thanks to Manhattan Concert Productions, he returned to it in 2014.

In 2005, Moran adapted The Tricky Part into a memoir that was published by Beacon Press. In 2013, Moran debuted a second solo show All the Rage in New York, where he currently lives; in 2016, All the Rage was adapted into a memoir by Moran and was published in May by Beacon Press.

== Bibliography ==
Memoirs

- The Tricky Part: A Boy's Story of Sexual Trespass, a Man's Journey to Forgiveness, Beacon Press, ISBN 978-0-8070-7262-2 (hardcover, 2005); Vintage Books, ISBN 978-0-3072-7653-7 (paperback, 2006); Beacon Press, ISBN 978-0-8070-8450-2 (paperback, 2016)
- All the Rage: A Quest, Beacon Press, ISBN 978-0-8070-8657-5 (hardcover, 2016)

Plays

- All the Rage, Dramatists Play Service, ISBN 978-0-8222-2928-5 (2013)
- The Tricky Part, Dramatists Play Service, ISBN 978-0-8222-2036-7 (2005)
