= Richard Jones (director) =

British theatre and opera director (born 1953)

Richard Jones CBE
- Born: 7 June 1953 (age 73); London, England
- Education: University of Hull; University of London
- Occupation: Theatre director
- Years active: 1982–present

Richard Jones CBE (born 7 June 1953) is a British theatre and opera director. He was born in London, and studied at the University of Hull and University of London. After working as a jazz musician, he spent 1982–83 on a bursary working with Scottish Opera and the Citizens Theatre.

His work has become controversial and has provoked considerable reactions from the UK press. However, he is also seen as a major figure in the worlds of theatre and opera, as has been noted in a 2002 interview which appeared in London's The Guardian:

[His] gift for the thrilling, the gaudy and the wayward is one of the characteristics that marks Jones out. "He is the best British director around at the moment", says director David Pountney, part of the "powerhouse" triumvirate that presided over English National Opera in the 1980s. "He is extremely imaginative, he has a very individual, quirky response to the material, and a very sharp eye for humour."

== Professional career ==
=== Opera ===
Jones's earliest productions were for the Batignano Festival, Opera Northern Ireland and Opera 80, now English Touring Opera. He came to prominence in 1987 with the world première of Judith Weir's A Night at the Chinese Opera for Kent Opera and a production of Mignon at the Wexford Festival. Overall, he has worked for a wide range of well-known opera companies, including directing five productions for the Royal Opera House, Covent Garden; Lohengrin (Munich) and Skin Deep for Opera North, Copenhagen, and Bregenz); several for the Glyndebourne Festival; two for Frankfurt Opera; productions for Brussels as well as the Olivier Award-winning Hansel and Gretel for Welsh National Opera. Operas ranging from Cavalleria Rusticana and Pagliacci to From Morning to Midnight, The Bitter Tears of Petra von Kant and The Love for Three Oranges appeared on the stage of English National Opera while Pelleas and Melisande was presented for both Opera North and ENO in 1995. This production was described as "one of Jones's unalloyed successes", while his 1993 Ring Cycle at Covent Garden came in for much criticism: "[it] was greeted with bemusement, even contempt: one paper called it "a monument of garish flippancy and banal cartoon caricature". "The audience's catcalls on the first night of Das Rheingold made front-page news" noted Charlotte Higgins in her 2002 interview with the director, and a photo of the Rhinemaidens in fat suits even made the front page of the Sun newspaper. As a result, ENO's decision to entrust Jones with their new Ring Cycle in 2021 "raised some eyebrows", according to Nicholas Kenyon's review in the Telegraph. In the event, reviews of The Valkyrie (with which the cycle opened) were almost unanimously hostile to the production.

He has directed for Amsterdam and Munich, while L'enfant et les sortilèges appeared on the Paris Opera stage. The summer festival at Bregenz featured large-scale productions of Un ballo in maschera and La bohème. Berg's Wozzeck was staged in Berlin and at Welsh National Opera.

In 2013, Jones directed the production of Benjamin Britten's opera Gloriana at The Royal Opera House in London for the centennial of Britten's birth. Additionally, the American premiere of the opera Anna Nicole was presented by New York City Opera in September, a revival of his original production at The Royal Opera House at Covent Garden.

=== The theatre ===
Theatre work includes five productions for the Young Vic in London and which range from The Government Inspector to Annie Get Your Gun. Black Snow was directed for the American Repertory Theatre, plus All's Well That Ends Well for The Public Theater in New York. In London, Holy Mothers was presented at the Ambassadors and the Royal Court Theatre, while La Bête was seen in London's West End and on Broadway, where it received a Tony nomination. On Broadway, Jones' productions of the Maury Yeston Tony Award-winning Best Musical Titanic and Wrong Mountain were presented. For the Royal Shakespeare Company, Jones directed A Midsummer Night's Dream, which provoked critical reactions such as the comments "Dream world ruined by this vandal's romp" and "Miserably undercast, grotesquely overdesigned, sloppily directed and lacks the following: theatricality, comedy and magic" which appeared as part of The Guardian's interview. Higgins also notes that the production "is now generally known as the play that got the worst reviews of the RSC's entire history and of any theatre production for the past 20 years.

Le Bourgeois gentilhomme by Molière and Tales from the Vienna Woods by Ödön von Horváth—in a new version by David Harrower—were presented by the National Theatre in London.

=== Recent years ===
In 2011, Jones directed David Harrower's Government Inspector (after Gogol's Revisor of 1836) at Warwick Arts Centre and London's Young Vic Theatre; the production featured Julian Barratt and Doon Mackichan.

Additionally, Offenbach's opera, Les contes d'Hoffmann, was directed for the Bavarian State Opera in Munich. This production concentrated on the poet's state of mind, intensified by drinking and pipe-smoking. All three loves occupied physically similar spaces, as if their tales existed only in Hoffmann's imagination. Rolando Villazón sang Hoffmann, having returned to vocal form after difficulties, and Diana Damrau took the roles of Olympia, Antonia, Giulietta and, mutely, Stella. It was conducted by Constantinos Carydis. The production was also noteworthy for Angela Brower's portrayal of the leading role of Nicklausse, Hoffmann's constant companion. English National Opera co-commissioned the staging, which received negative reviews along with the good, provoking this response in Britain's Opera magazine:

Of course there were striking elements in Jones's direction—there always are—his handling of the doll for one, and the effect of the rose-tinted spectacles, which he didn't follow through consistently. I was less sure of King Kong watching the Antonia act from the floats, and joining in Giulietta's entourage. And as of now the Giulietta act is a mess. In sum, the Jones Hoffmann is too abstract, too loose of focus, and far too long. Perhaps Kaye-Keck could be persuaded to turn their minds to an "authentic" opéra comique edition.

Other reviews took different approaches.

== Awards ==
Year	Won / Nom.	Award	For	Role	Production
1988	Won	Olivier Award	Best Newcomer in a Play	Director	Too Clever by Half (Old Vic Theatre)
1990	Won	Evening Standard Award	Best Director	Director	Into the Woods (Phoenix Theatre) and The Illusion (Old Vic Theatre)
1991	Nom.	Tony Award	Best Director	Director	La Bête (Broadway)
1991	Won	Olivier Award	Best Director of a Musical	Director	Into the Woods (Phoenix Theatre)
1996	Won	Evening Standard Award	Outstanding Artistic Achievement	Director	Der Ring
1997	Won	Tony Award	Best Musical	Director	Titanic (Broadway)
2000	Won	Olivier Award	Best New Opera	Director	Hansel and Gretel (WNO at Sadlers Wells)
2000	Won	Opernwelt	Designer of the Year	Designer	with Antony MacDonald – Un ballo in maschera
2001	Won	TMA Award	Achievement In Opera	Director	with Vladimir Jurowski and the company – The Queen of Spades (WNO)
2004	Won	Olivier Award	Best Opera Production	Director	The Trojans (ENO at the London Coliseum)
2005	Won	Olivier Award	Best Opera Production	Director	Lady Macbeth of Mtsensk (Royal Opera House)
2005	Won	TMA Award	Achievement in Opera	Director	with Valdimir Jurowski – Wozzeck (WNO)
2011	Won	South Bank Sky Arts Award	Best Opera Production	Director	Die Meistersinger von Nürnberg (WNO)
2012	Nom.	Olivier Award	Outstanding Achievement in Opera	Director	Anna Nicole and Il ttrittico (Royal Opera House), The Tales of Hoffmann (London Coliseum)
2015	Won	Olivier Award	Outstanding Achievement in Opera	Director	The Girl of the Golden West, The Mastersingers of Nuremberg and Rodelinda at London Coliseum
2019	Won	Olivier Award	Best New Opera Production	Director	Káťa Kabanová
2020	Won	South Bank Sky Arts Awards	Best Opera	Director	Káťa Kabanová

== Production history ==
Year	Production	Venue
2007	Billy Budd	Oper Frankfurt
2008	Rusalka	The Royal Danish Theatre, Copenhagen
2008	The Bitter Tears of Petra von Kant	Theater Basel
2008	The Good Soul of Szechuan	Young Vic
2008	Cavalleria rusticana and Pagliacci	London Coliseum (English National Opera)
2009	Skin Deep	Opera North
2009	Lady Macbeth of Mtsensk	New National Theatre Tokyo
2009	Falstaff	Glyndebourne Festival Opera
2009	Lohengrin	Bayerische Staatsoper, Munich
2009	Annie Get Your Gun	Young Vic
2009	Rumpelstiltskin	Birmingham Contemporary Music Group
2009	Rusalka	Finnish National Opera, Helsinki
2010	The Gambler	Royal Opera House
2010	Pique Dame	Houston Grand Opera
2010	Skin Deep	The Royal Danish Theatre, Copenhagen
2010	Die Meistersinger	Welsh National Opera, Cardiff
2011	The Cunning Little Vixen	De Nederlandse Opera, Amsterdam
2011	Anna Nicole	Royal Opera House
2011	Billy Budd	De Nederlandse Opera, Amsterdam
2011	Macbeth	Opera de Lille
2011	The Government Inspector	Young Vic
2011	Il trittico	Royal Opera House
2011	Les Contes d'Hoffmann	Bavarian State Opera, Munich
2012	The Tales of Hoffmann	London Coliseum (English National Opera)
2012	Juliette ou la Clef des songes	Grand Théâtre de Genève
2012	Věc Makropulos	Städtische Bühnen Frankfurt
2012	Peter Grimes	La Scala, Milan
2012	Julietta	London Coliseum (English National Opera)
2013	Gloriana	Staatsoper Hamburg
2013	Hansel and Gretel	Bayerische Staatsoper, Munich
2013	Public Enemy	Young Vic
2013	Gloriana	Royal Opera House
2013	Billy Budd	Gotesborgsoperan
2013	Anna Nicole	New York City Opera
2014	Rodelinda	London Coliseum (English National Opera)
2014	Der Rosenkavalier	Glyndebourne Festival Opera
2014	Ariodante	Festival D'Aix En Provence
2014	La fanciulla del West	London Coliseum (English National Opera)
2015	The Mastersingers of Nuremberg	London Coliseum (English National Opera)
2015	The Queen of Spades	Teatro Dell'Opera di Roma
2015	The Trial	Young Vic
2015	The Hairy Ape	Old Vic
2016	Once In A Lifetime	Young Vic
2016	Boris Godunov	Royal Opera House
2016	Ariodante	De Nederlandse Opera, Amsterdam
2016	Don Giovanni	London Coliseum (English National Opera)
2017	The Hairy Ape	Park Avenue Armory, New York
2017	La bohème	Royal Opera House
2017	The Twilight Zone	Almeida Theatre
2018	Parsifal	Opera National de Paris
2019	Káťa Kabanová	Royal Opera House
2019	The Twilight Zone	Ambassadors Theatre
2019	La Damnation de Faust	Glyndebourne Festival Opera
2019	Judgment Day	Park Avenue Armoury, New York
2020	Endgame	Old Vic
2021	La clemenza di Tito	Royal Opera House
2021	Valkyrie	London Coliseum (English National Opera)
2022	Samson et Delila	Royal Opera House
2023	Pygmalion	The Old Vic
2024	Machinal	The Old Vic
2025	Festen	Royal Opera House
2026	I Puritani	Royal Opera House
