= The Yale Alley Cats =

Cappella group

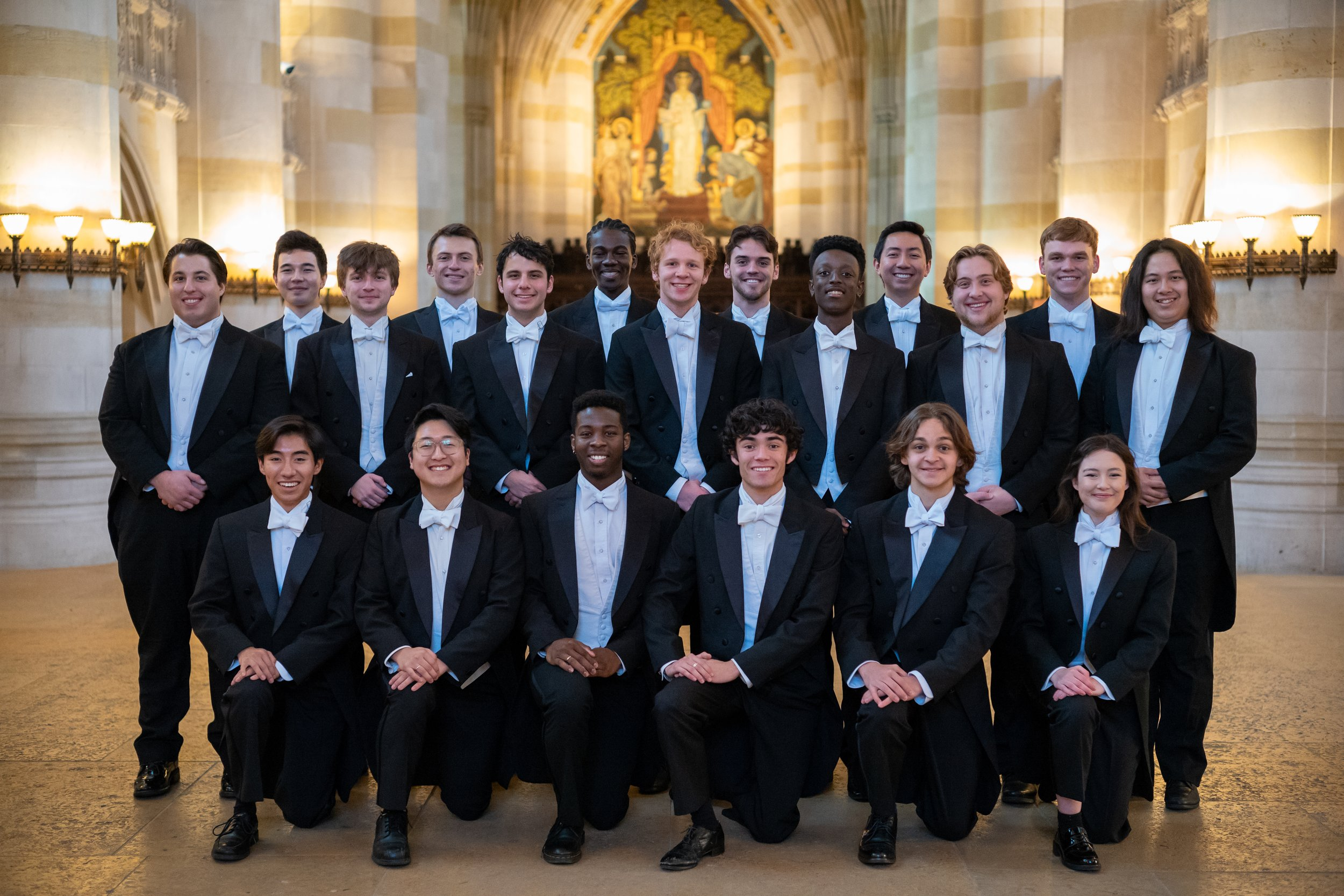
- The Yale Alley Cats of 2023-2024

Background information
- Origin: New Haven, Connecticut, U.S.
- Genres: A cappella, pop, jazz, R&B, Motown, soul
- Years active: 1943 – present (83 years)
- Members: Tenor I Miah-Reese Govan '30; Savannah Emery '30; Jack Miller '29; Lyle Mondano '28 Tenor II; Ethan Savage '30; Arnav Nawani '29; Parker Mednikow '29; Jaden Nicita '28 Baritone; Bobby Chiu '30; Nyle Jones '29; Jehan Fernando '28; Leo Rael '28 Bass; Cary Friedrich '26; Theo Bowne '27; Richard Eichorst '29; August Rivers '28
- Website: www.yalealleycats.com

The Yale Alley Cats is an undergraduate a cappella singing group at Yale University, the college's third-oldest.

In the summer of 1943, four Yale undergraduate students climbed Saybrook Tower to serenade the night with Henry Carey's "Sally in Our Alley." Their singing awoke the Saybrook Head of College, who yelled at them: "Stop it! Your singing sounds like a bunch of screeching alley cats!" and sent them to bed. The performance marked the founding of the group and gave it its name.

While the group’s early performances centered on jazz, their current repertoire includes pop, R&B, Motown, folk, and other genres. The group says it has created more than 400 a cappella arrangements.

Each April, The Alley Cats hosts its "Champagne Jamboree," or "Cham Jam", an on-campus performance that customarily features a non-male guest soloist from the senior class.

The group's website says it also performs for public and private audiences throughout the United States and around the world, funding their travels with concert revenue. It says that audience members have included Martha Stewart, Jay Leno, Stella McCartney, Tom Brokaw, and President Barack Obama. In 2017, the group performed at Facebook headquarters and Google headquarters on their tour of the California Bay Area, then at the United Nations office in Geneva, Switzerland, and at the United States Embassy in Paris, France. In 2018, the group completed a ten-city tour of China through the invitation of Beijing Shengchou Education Technology Company, including collaborations with the Central Conservatory of Music and other schools and hotels across the nation such as the Little Swan Choir in Xi'an. Tour destinations for the 2023-24 season included Hawaii, China, Switzerland, Qatar, and South Africa, with performances for the Chicago White Sox and at the Forbidden City Concert Hall in Beijing.

In 2021, the Alley Cats collaborated with songwriter Diane Warren to create a music video of her lead single from the movie Four Good Days, "Somehow You Do".

In 2023, Ryann Schaffer became the first female member of the Alley Cats.

As with many Yale a cappella groups, first-year students audition for the Alley Cats in a multi-week process known as "Rush." Current members choose several applicants to join the group for three years.

== Notable alumni ==
Many Alley Cats go on to join The Yale Whiffenpoofs—a selective all-senior a cappella group—and some have gone on to careers in the performing arts, including:

- James Bohanek ‘91, Broadway actor
- Jacob Clemente '19, starred as Billy in Billy Elliot the Musical
- Manoel Felciano '92, actor, singer-songwriter
- Andy Sandberg '06, producer, director, writer, actor
- Josh Singer '94, producer, writer of Maestro and Spotlight
- George R. Steel '94, musician, composer

== Discography ==
The Yale Alley Cats say they have recorded 35 albums and one EP, including several live albums. Their 2013 album "Ghost of a Chance," on the Bridge Records, Inc. label, was submitted to the 52nd Grammy Awards for Best Pop Vocal Album. Their 2021 album "Gemini," was nominated for Best Lower Voices Collegiate Album by the Contemporary A Capella Society (CASA).

Title	Year released
Gemini	2021
Limelight	2020
Love Lost - EP	2019
Havana - Single	2019
Pick of the Litter: The Very Best of the Yale Alley Cats Vol. 2	2019
Midnight Drive	2017
The Gamble	2015
Pick of the Litter: The Very Best of the Yale Alley Cats Vol. 1	2014
Noir	2013
Maneki Neko	2010
Ghost of a Chance	2009
Classic	2006
Ninth Live	2004
Day & Night	2003
Est. 1943	2001
Cats Around the World	2000
Scratch	1999
Live in Europe	1998
Hot Tin Roof	1997
Swinging Cat	1995
Lingers on My Mind	1993
Mood Calico	1991
Top Hat & Tails	1989
Faux Paws	1987
The Cat's Out	1983
Night and Day	1981
Down for Double	1979
Magic To Do	1977
Out Cattin'	1975
25th Anniversary	1973
Our House	1971
Tales of the Alley Cats	1969
You Go to My Head	1967
Just For My Love	1965
The Yale Alley Cats: Volume IV	1964
Bewitching...	1963
The Yale Alley Cats	1958
