= Lost Coast Brewery =

Independent brewery in Eureka, California, U.S.

Coordinates: 40°48′10.95″N 124°9′53.04″W

- Type: Independent
- Industry: Alcoholic beverage
- Founded: 1989
- Founder: Barbara Groom; Wendy Pound
- Headquarters: Eureka, California, US
- Products: Beer
- Production output: ~75,000 US barrels per year
- Owner: Barbara Groom
- Website: www.lostcoast.com

Lost Coast Brewery is an independent brewery located in Eureka, California. It produces year-round and seasonal beers and has received various awards from both local and national brewing organizations.

Between 1990 and 2011, the brewery expanded production to 60,000 barrels per year. A larger production facility built in 2014 permits 200,000 to 600,000 barrels annually.

== History ==
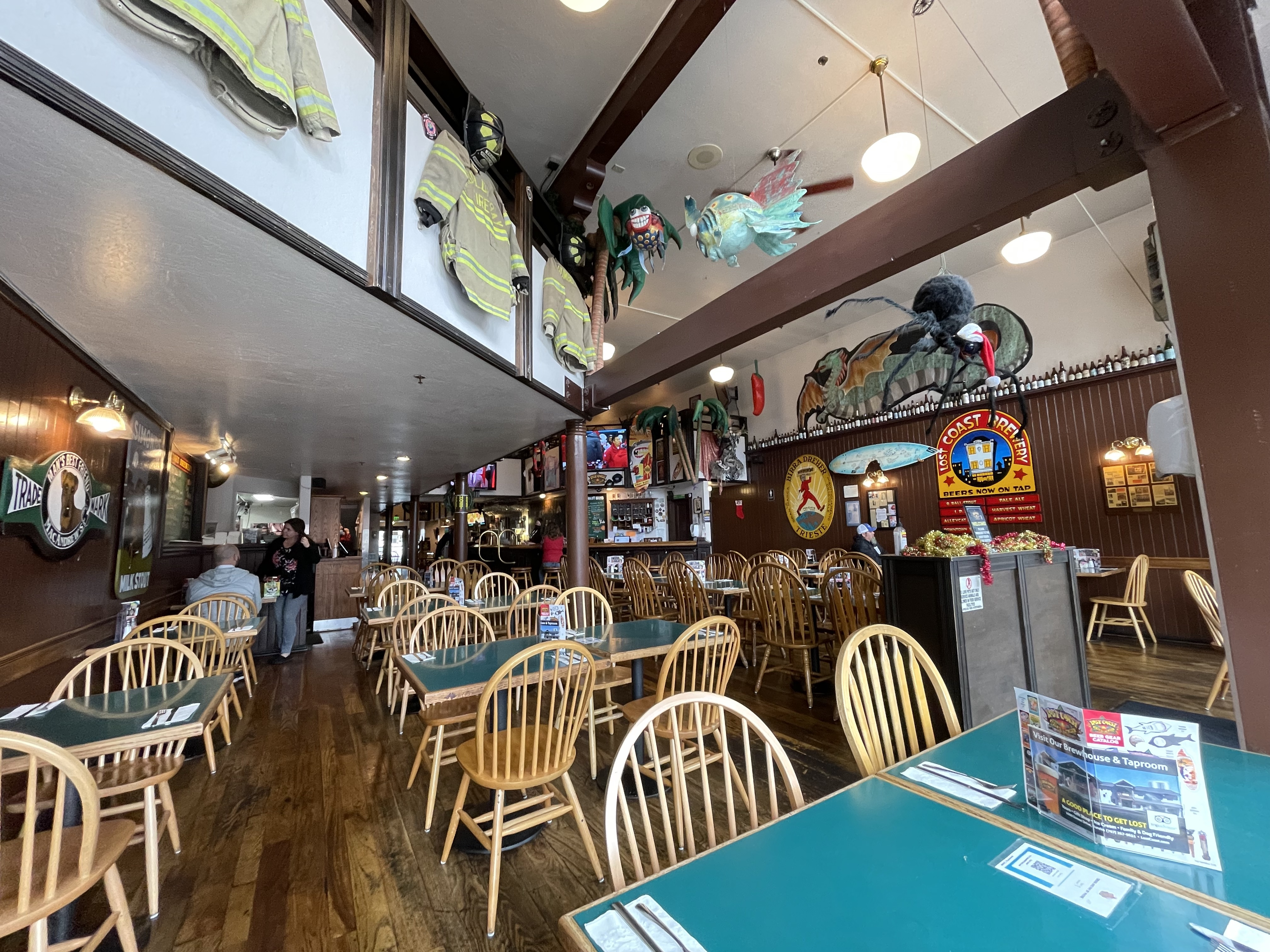
Lost Coast Brewery's brewpub in Eureka, California.

Lost Coast Brewery was founded by Wendy Pound and Barbara Groom in 1989. It is one of only two female-owned breweries in Humboldt County, along with Six Rivers Brewery in McKinleyville.

Pound and Groom developed the idea in 1986 and spent three years on research and development including visits to English and Welsh pubs, home experimentation and refining their techniques. In 1989, they bought the Fraternal Order of the Knights of Pythias Pythian Castle and opened the brewery and pub there in 1990. The brewery outgrew the original location and moved to a larger building in Eureka in 1994, where by 2011, they produced 60,000 barrels of beer, making it the 46th largest brewery in the U.S. despite distribution in only 19 states at the time.

In 2012, the U.S. Brewers Association named Lost Coast Brewery one of the top 50 (by volume) craft and overall breweries, and listed it as number 38 on their nationwide ranking. Following a decade of nearly 20 percent per annum growth, Lost Coast employed 80 people and announced a $15 million new free-standing facility in Eureka, on a 9.3 acres (3.8 ha) site. The plan allowed them to open a facility producing between 200,000 and 600,000 barrels annually.

In 2013, Lost Coast Brewery distributed beer to 21 states of U.S and 11 nations.

== Products ==
Lost Coast brews both year-round and seasonal beers.

- Great White is an unfiltered, Belgian Witbier. Its base is malted barley and unmalted wheat with citrus and Humboldt county herbs. In 2002 and 2003, Lost Coast's Great White Ale was a silver medalist at the California State Fair.
- Tangerine Wheat is a wheat beer flavored with lemon. The Los Angeles Times called it a "charming outdoor sipper as the weather warms, and it has real potential as a food beer".
- Downtown Brown was the first beer distributed by Lost Coast Brewery. It's a lightly hopped dark malt ale. In 1993, it won a bronze medal in the American Brown Ale category at the Great American Beer Festival. From 1997 through 2000, Downtown Brown was voted the number one beer in the Time Standard Reader's Choice Awards, and won first place at the 2000 West Coast Beer Fest. In 2002, Downtown Brown received a gold medal at the LA County Fair and another gold in 2003 at the California State Fair.
- Alleycat Amber is a burgundy-orange ale with a sweet aroma, a caramel flavor, and slight bitterness. At the 1997 California Brewer's Fest, the Alleycat Amber won both a gold medal and Best in Show. At the California State Fair in 1999 and 2002, Alleycat was the Bronze Medal beer.
- 8-Ball Stout is an ale brewed with malts roasted like coffee beans to give the beer its color and flavor. This stout was a two-time gold medalist at the Los Angeles County Fair in 2004 and 2005. It also won silver medals at the California State Fair in 2002 and 2003.
- Indica India Pale Ale is an ale brewed with hops, herbs, and citrus flavors. Indica India Pale Ale was recognized as one of the World's "Must Taste Beers" in the 2003 "All About Beer Magazine". The label design caused religious controversy in 2004. A lawsuit on the design went to the California Supreme Court which decided the label was protected by free speech. The design was subsequently modified slightly. The controversy has been discussed by the Parliament of India and resulted in dozens of angry complaints since. The beer won a gold medal at the Los Angeles County Fair (2004), at the Humboldt County Fair (2001, 2003, 2006) and second place at the California State Fair (2012).
- Fogcutter Double IPA
- Revenant IPA
- Hazy IPA
- Watermelon Wheat
- Raspberry Brown is Lost Coast Brewery's Downtown Brown with an infusion of raspberry and chocolate malt flavor. In 2003, the Raspberry Brown was voted best in California by the United States Beer Tasting Championships.
- Winterbraun is a seasonal "winter warmer." The ale uses Saaz hops, and chocolate and caramel malts that are added at the end of the brewing process. Winterbraun placed second in the 1998 World Beer Championship.
- Other seasonal selections have included Apricot Wheat, Harvest Wheat, Scotch Ale, Strawberry Wheat
