= Homicide: Life on the Street season 7 =

Homicide: Life on the Street
- Season 7
- Season 7 U.S. DVD cover
- Starring: Richard Belzer; Giancarlo Esposito; Peter Gerety; Clark Johnson; Yaphet Kotto; Toni Lewis; Michael Michele; Kyle Secor; Jon Seda; Callie Thorne
- No. of episodes: 23

Release
- Original network: NBC
- Original release: September 25, 1998 – May 21, 1999

Season chronology
- ← Previous; Season 6

The seventh and final season of Homicide: Life on the Street aired in the United States on the NBC television network from September 25, 1998 to May 21, 1999 and contained 22 episodes.

The seventh season marked the debut of characters FBI Agent Mike Giardello (Giancarlo Esposito) and Detective Rene Sheppard (Michael Michele). Recurring character Detective Terri Stivers (Toni Lewis) became a regular cast member as of season 7, while Chief Medical Examiner George Griscom (Austin Pendleton) becomes a recurring character following the season 6 departure of C.M.E. Julianna Cox.

The DVD box set of season 7 was released for Region 1 on June 28, 2005. The set includes all 22 season 7 episodes on six discs.

During the sixth season, NBC considered canceling the show in the face of consistently low ratings, but a number of shocks at NBC increased Homicide's value. Among those factors were the loss of the popular series Seinfeld and the $850 million deal needed to keep ER from leaving the network. As a result, the network approved a 22-episode seventh season.

== Episodes ==
When first shown on network television, multiple episodes towards the end of season were aired out of order. The DVD present the episodes in the correct chronological order, restoring all storylines and character developments.

No. overall	No. in season	Title	Directed by	Written by	Original release date	Prod. code	U.S. viewers (millions)
101	1	"La Famiglia"	Nick Gomez	Tom Fontana	September 25, 1998	701	9.81
Bayliss, Gharty, and Ballard return to duty to find a completely remodeled squadroom and a new detective in the unit: Rene Sheppard, fresh from the fugitive squad. Everyone is called in to work a trio of savage murders in Little Italy, with one of the victims being Gee's cousin Mario. Gee's estranged son Mike, an FBI agent stationed in Phoenix, arrives in town and helps close the case, whose roots stretch back to Mario's choice to testify against a union boss 25 years earlier. Bayliss exhibits a new, Buddhist-influenced philosophical attitude toward his work, and hints of relationships among the detectives begin to surface - including one between Munch and Billie Lou.
102	2	"Brotherly Love"	Peter Medak	Julie Martin	October 16, 1998	702	8.99
Lewis and Sheppard investigate the shooting death of a man in his own home. The long-standing rivalry between the victim and his identical twin brother leads them to a reason for the killing. Ballard and Gharty team up with a narcotics detective from Washington, D.C. to check out a teenager's fuzzy account of a D.C. drug buy that led to his friend being shot and killed. Mike surprises Gee with news of his transfer into the BPD as an FBI agent liaison, and Gharty decides to leave his wife. Guest starring: Anthony Joseph Perry as Detective Joe Landrewsky
103	3	"Just an Old Fashioned Love Song"	Leslie Libman and Larry Williams	Eric Overmyer	October 23, 1998	703	8.44
Ballard and Mike take the case of an intruder found shot dead in the garage of a sports medicine specialist. The victim is his sister-in-law, who had run up large gambling debts and was desperate to pay them off with or without his help. Munch faces an IRS audit and a bill for $30,000 in back taxes. Sheppard and Bayliss decide to go out on a date after revealing their thoughts about bisexuality to each other, Falsone thinks about asking Ballard out, and Gharty shows interest in Billie Lou while taking time off to move out of his house.
104	4	"The Twenty Percent Solution"	Clark Johnson	David Simon	October 30, 1998	704	8.00
Days after the disappearance of a best-selling mystery writer, his wife arrives in the squadroom insisting that he has been murdered. With no body or direct evidence of a crime, Ballard and Gharty scramble to wade through the potential suspects - the writer's wife, his mistress, his agent, an ex-CIA operative - and Danvers has his hands full taking the case to trial. Munch's plans for a weekend getaway with Billie Lou are thrown into chaos when he and Bayliss investigate the death of an elderly woman during a burglary attempt; the two are hard put to decide whether or not they have a murder on their hands. Taking a not-so-subtle hint from Stivers, Falsone asks Ballard out on a date.
105	5	"Red, Red Wine"	Edward Bianchi	Sara B. Charno	November 6, 1998	705	9.98
A rash of strange flu deaths turns into a red ball once Bayliss and Sheppard learn that all the victims drank poisoned wine. The FBI gets involved and places Mike in charge of the case, but his decisions on strategy and public relations put him sharply at odds with Gee, especially after Gee leaks information to the media in hopes of preventing more deaths. Bayliss' reaction to a suspect's confession leaves him wondering if his outlook on life really has changed after his shooting. Rumors fly in the squadroom after Falsone and Ballard's first date, while Munch confides in Lewis about a secret trip to his doctor and soon comes to regret it.
106	6	"Wanted Dead or Alive, Part 1"	Robert Harmon	James Yoshimura	November 13, 1998	706	10.25
A man is shot and killed when a team of bounty hunters raids a house looking for a bail jumper. Falsone and Stivers quickly arrest one of the team members, P.J. Johnson, as the shooter, but he soon jumps his own bail to look for the fugitive. The detectives and team leader Dennis Knoll form an uneasy partnership to find Johnson, but their chase turns disastrous with a car wreck that leaves Lewis and a woman seriously injured. Gharty's mention of his Army service during the Vietnam War leads to relentless pestering from Munch, who does not believe his accounts, and Gaffney starts leaning on Mike to give him inside information on the performance of Gee's shift. Guest starring: Christopher Meloni as Dennis Knoll
107	7	"Wanted Dead or Alive, Part 2"	Robert Harmon	Anya Epstein	November 20, 1998	707	10.74
Lewis and the injured woman are rushed to the hospital and Johnson is re-arrested. Mike insists on taking responsibility for the accident, even after the woman dies and her husband files a wrongful-death suit against the department. Once Knoll and Mike work with Falsone to discover that the original fugitive has fled to Miami, the two of them head south with Bayliss to bring him back. The resolution of the cases leaves a bad taste in everyone's mouth, though. As Gharty's wife files for divorce, he decides to spend all the money he can in order to keep her from getting any of it in the settlement. Guest starring: Christopher Meloni as Dennis Knoll
108	8	"Kellerman, P.I., Part 1"	Kenneth Fink	Story by : James Yoshimura & Julie Martin; Teleplay by : Joy Lusco	December 4, 1998	708	9.49
The discovery of a hastily buried newborn behind a motel leads Falsone and Stivers to a teenage couple, Debbie Straub and Craig Halpern. Although both of them insist that the baby was stillborn, the autopsy points to homicide. The case brings Mike Kellerman - now a private investigator, hired by Debbie's parents to clear her name - to the squadroom in search of information. His arrival rankles most of the squad, and Gee orders Falsone and Stivers to tell him nothing. After Danvers gets indictments against Debbie and Craig, Kellerman advises the Straubs not to bail their daughter out; soon afterward, she calls home and offers to testify against Craig. Guest starring: Jena Malone as Debbie Straub and Reed Diamond as Mike Kellerman
109	9	"Kellerman, P.I., Part 2"	Jay Tobias	Story by : Tom Fontana & Eric Overmyer; Teleplay by : Sean Whitesell	December 11, 1998	709	9.32
Debbie testifies against Craig as part of a plea bargain, resulting in his conviction on a murder charge, but Falsone is not satisfied with the outcome. A visit with Craig reveals Debbie's involvement in the baby's death; shortly afterwards, he hangs himself in his cell. Sheppard's curiosity about Kellerman's departure from the squad stirs up bad feelings all around, but she lends him a sympathetic ear at the Waterfront. Falsone's contempt for his former coworker softens after Kellerman brings in voice mail recordings that show just how thoroughly Debbie manipulated Craig. Guest starring: Jena Malone as Debbie Straub and Reed Diamond as Mike Kellerman
110	10	"Shades of Gray"	Adam Bernstein	Story by : David Simon & Julie Martin; Teleplay by : T. J. English	January 8, 1999	710	12.29
When a white bus driver runs into a pregnant woman in a black neighborhood, a riot breaks out that leaves both the driver and a West Indian passenger dead. The detectives question the witnesses and themselves about the effect that race may have played in this violence, and are surprised at the answers they find. Lewis' discovery of a police uniform button near the passenger's body leads the squad to an officer who had been questioned in the shooting death of a black man five years earlier. (See the season two episodes "See No Evil" and "Black and Blue".) As Lewis and Sheppard track down a witness, Sheppard suffers a brutal beating and loses her gun; Lewis is shot at and nearly killed as well. The gun is returned after an angry Lewis speaks to a packed West Indian dance club, and the officer and three other suspects are arrested in connection with the two deaths.
111	11	"Bones of Contention"	Brad Anderson	Story by : Eric Overmyer; Teleplay by : Jason Yoshimura	January 15, 1999	711	10.57
Munch and Lewis investigate a set of female skeletal remains dug up at a construction site. Their investigation reveals that the woman was part of a gang of bank robbers active in the 1980s, and interviews with the two surviving members result in criminal charges against them both for her death. After Gee warns Falsone that he or Ballard will have to transfer to the other shift if their relationship is serious, they decide to keep seeing each other in secret. Sheppard returns to work but is put on desk duty, greatly frustrating her, and Lewis gives her a "souvenir": the bullet-nicked hat he was wearing on the night she was beaten.
112	12	"The Same Coin"	Lisa Cholodenko	Story by : David Simon & James Yoshimura; Teleplay by : Sharon Guskin	January 29, 1999	712	10.67
Called to the scene of a hit-and-run fatality, Munch and Mike are hard put to decide if the death was accidental or deliberate. Gharty recognizes the victim's knife and tattoo as marks of military service in Vietnam, and Munch confirms this after a look at the man's service record. The death turns out to be an accident, caused by a teenager joyriding in a stolen car. Munch obtains Gharty's record as well, sparking curiosity about the "other than honorable" discharge he received. Gharty snaps and tells the whole story: he saw American troops massacring Vietnamese civilians and tried to stop them, only to be ordered off the scene. Sheppard is cleared to return to full duty, but becomes angry at Lewis' reluctance to partner with her. Guest starring: Margo Martindale as Verna Henderson
113	13	"Homicide.com"	Jay Tobias	Story by : Ayelet Sela & Sara B. Charno; Teleplay by : Sara B. Charno	February 5, 1999	713	11.23
Sheppard and Bayliss investigate a woman's ritual stabbing death that was broadcast on the Internet. As news spreads of another scheduled performance, Sheppard fights to keep control of the case - her first red ball, and her first as primary following her beating - and Gee pushes her to get results. The killer, Luke Ryland, misdirects the police to carry out his second murder, then hijacks Bayliss' personal Website for a third one after Sheppard baits him into it. After a heated confrontation between Bayliss and Sheppard, the police arrest Ryland before he can commit this new murder. A crossover episode with the online spin-off Homicide: Second Shift.
114	14	"A Case of Do or Die"	Tim Van Patten	Anya Epstein	February 12, 1999	714	10.72
Bayliss and Ballard take the case of a bride-to-be found dead at the bottom of a cliff. None of the evidence conclusively points to homicide, suicide, or an accidental fall, and even the capture of a mugger fails to resolve the case. Ballard admits to Falsone that it has touched a nerve for her because she ran out on her own wedding. Sheppard and Mike are called to a movie theater in which one of the customers is found dead in his seat. The man had a habit of yelling out endings to the films; fed up with this behavior, the manager laced his popcorn with a sedative overdose. Gee's daughter Charisse gives birth to a son. Guest starring: Amy Ryan as Erika Cullen, Wallace Shawn as Frank Hopper
115	15	"Sideshow"	Ed Sherin	David Simon	February 19, 1999	715	12.93
Detectives from Baltimore and New York continue investigating the deaths of both a government official and her killer. They eventually discover that the plot to commit the original murder started with allegations of sexual discrimination within the office of the White House Chief of Staff. However, an independent counsel looking into improper behavior in the White House takes over the case, frustrating Danvers and McCoy in their efforts to prosecute the murders. Meanwhile, Danvers comes up for a judicial appointment, but loses it after details of his juvenile criminal record come to light. Gee begins to regret allowing Mike to work with the unit after Mike's reports to his FBI superiors help to derail the prosecution. Note: This episode concludes a crossover event that begins on Law & Order season 9 episode 14 Sideshow. Guest starring: Benjamin Bratt as Rey Curtis, Jerry Orbach as Lennie Briscoe, and Sam Waterston as Jack McCoy.
116	16	"Truth Will Out"	Keith Samples	Story by : Noel Behn & Anya Epstein; Teleplay by : Anya Epstein	March 26, 1999	716	9.83
A woman comes to Falsone and asks him to reopen the case of her younger brother's 1972 death – an accident she caused, according to her mother. The case stirs up painful memories for Gee, who had been its primary, and he, Falsone, and Stivers eventually learn the truth: the mother battered the boy to death and blamed her daughter. Bayliss faces widespread ridicule and criticism within the department after word spreads about his personal website, which includes his musings on sexual and spiritual matters. Warned by Gee that it may jeopardize his career, and reeling from his sudden rejection by a gay sergeant trying to stay in the closet, he decides to shut the site down. Falsone and Ballard reconsider their secret relationship after Stivers spots them together at dinner. Guest starring: Elizabeth Ashley as Madeline Pitt, Brooke Smith as Josephine Pitt and Young Madeline Pitt
117	17	"Zen and the Art of Murder"	Miguel Arteta	Story by : Tom Fontana & Julie Martin; Teleplay by : Lloyd Rose	April 2, 1999	717	11.03
Munch and Lewis are called to the scene of a Buddhist monk beaten to death in his own temple. Gee puts Bayliss on the case, prompting Munch to pull out of it in frustration, and the detectives learn of tensions among the temple monks and the victim's own unwholesome secrets. The case leads Bayliss to a homeless man, who admits to the killing and then shoots at him; Bayliss kills the man in self-defense, shattering his Buddhist beliefs. Gharty and Ballard take a sidewalk shooting with three eyewitnesses, but the case slowly falls apart as the identifications prove unreliable. Falsone and Ballard end their secret relationship.
118	18	"Self Defense"	Barbara Kopple	Story by : David Simon & Eric Overmyer; Teleplay by : Yaphet Kotto	April 9, 1999	718	10.16
Falsone and Stivers take the case of a man shot to death in his own bed. His ex-wife, an assistant United States Attorney, admits to killing him but claims that she acted in self-defense due to battered woman syndrome. Mike gets involved in the case, over Gee's objections, and he and the detectives uncover evidence that suggests an intent to commit murder. Gee's chances for a promotion are jeopardized when he fails to persuade the presiding judge not to send the case to trial. Lewis reveals a bias against partnering with women as he ditches Ballard on a series of bar robberies that leave one man and the perpetrator dead. Falsone realizes that he still has feelings for Ballard, and Gharty idly proposes marriage to Billie Lou while drinking all day in the Waterfront, not realizing that she and Munch are already engaged.
120	19	"Lines of Fire"	Kathryn Bigelow	Story by : Tom Fontana & James Yoshimura; Teleplay by : James Yoshimura	May 7, 1999	719	10.25
A man takes his two children (son and stepdaughter) hostage, shoots and wounds a cop when the Quick Response Team arrives, and then demands to negotiate with Mike. Mike learns that the man has acted out of desperation over being laid off and his wife leaving him. When his wife breaks through the police line, he shoots wildly out the window and kills her, a fact that Mike works desperately to hide from him. The man offers to trade his gun for a pizza, but breaks the deal and lets his stepdaughter go before killing his son and himself too quickly for the QRT to react. Mike berates himself for missing a chance to save both children, even if it would have led to the man being killed by the QRT. Guest starring: Ron Eldard as Emmet Carey
121	20	"The Why Chromosome"	Kyle Secor	Anya Epstein	May 14, 1999	720	9.78
Ballard and Sheppard team up on the shooting death of a teenage girl outside a high school. The victim had been a member of a gang, introduced into it by her older sister, and had sex with a rival gang member before her death. Sheppard suspects his girlfriend, but the detectives find her dead before they can arrest her; they then take the older sister into custody, believing that she acted out of revenge. Billie Lou asks Munch to talk to her neighbor's abusive ex-boyfriend, who later storms into the Waterfront and slams her head on the bar. She decides to postpone their wedding, leaving Munch frustrated because the two have promised to abstain from sex until their wedding night.
119	21	"Identity Crisis"	Joe Berlinger	Story by : Tom Fontana & Eric Overmyer; Teleplay by : Willie Reale	April 30, 1999	721	10.54
Falsone and Lewis are called to the scene of a man shot to death in his backyard, his nose torn off and smoldering on his charcoal grill. Falsone suspects that one of the neighboring families is in witness protection, and Mike's inquiries reveal that the father is set to testify in a mob trial. However, those calls prompt the FBI to head off the detectives' efforts to prosecute him for the murder, and Mike resigns in disgust over being betrayed by his superiors. A marathon autopsy session turns up an extra body in the morgue, and Bayliss and Munch learn that the death occurred during a fight between two cousins over their uncle's watch. Ballard and Gharty investigate a bartender shot and killed during an armed robbery; a bank holdup soon afterward quickly leads them to the killer. After Ballard notices that Gharty is hung over, he decides to quit drinking for a month.
122	22	"Forgive Us Our Trespasses"	Alan Taylor	Tom Fontana	May 21, 1999	722	11.36
Luke Ryland ("Homicide.com") is set free on a technicality after several delays in his trial. Bayliss flies into a rage and shoves Danvers down the courthouse steps, but later apologizes at Gee's urging. Lewis and Falsone investigate a drug addict found stabbed to death in her home; afterward, they arrest her husband. Her sister—a Catholic nun—offers him her forgiveness. Gee's promotion comes through, but he turns it down because it will require him to transfer out of the homicide unit. Munch marries Billie Lou but spends his wedding night at the Waterfront after he is unable to consummate the marriage. Shortly after Ryland taunts Bayliss with his plans to continue his murders in New Orleans, Bayliss quietly packs his things and leaves the squad room without explanation. Lewis and Sheppard respond to a call of a body in an alley — Ryland, shot and killed (an event later referred to in Homicide: The Movie). As they begin to investigate, their conversation mirrors an exchange between Lewis and Crosetti in "Gone for Goode" season 1, ending with the same line: "That's what's wrong with this job. It ain't got nothing to do with life."
