= Nearer My God to Thee (Homicide: Life on the Street) =

- Homicide: Life on the Street episode
- Episode no.: Season 3 Episode 1
- Directed by: Tim Hunter
- Story by: Tom Fontana; Jorge Zamacona
- Teleplay by: Jorge Zamacona
- Cinematography by: Jean de Segonzac
- Production code: 301
- Original air date: October 14, 1994

Guest appearances
- Tony Todd as Matt Rhodes; Mary B. Ward as Beth Felton; Pamela Payton-Wright as Sister Magdalena Wright; Walt MacPherson as Det. Roger Gaffney; Ralph Tabakin as Dr. Scheiner; Gerald F. Gough as Col. Burt Granger; Beau James as Det. Willard Higby; Sharon Ziman as Naomi (uncredited)

Episode chronology
← Previous "A Many Splendored Thing"	Next → "Fits Like a Glove"
- Homicide: Life on the Street season 3

"Nearer My God to Thee" is the third season premiere of the American police drama television series Homicide: Life on the Street, and the fourteenth overall episode of the series. It originally aired on NBC in the United States on October 14, 1994. In the episode, the homicide department is assigned to the politically volatile murder of a beloved social worker, whose body is found wearing nothing but a pair of white gloves. Meanwhile, Felton struggles with marital problems, while Lewis and Munch try to find a business partner with whom to open a bar.

Directed by Tim Hunter, the episode written by Jorge Zamacona based on a story by Zomacona and executive producer Tom Fontana. It marked the debut of regular cast member Isabella Hofmann as Lt. Megan Russert, who was added to the show in part based a network desire for more women in the cast. It also included the first appearances of recurring detective characters Roger Gaffney (Walt MacPherson) and Willard Higby (Beau James).

"Nearer My God to Thee" began a three-episode story arc about the "white glove murders", which involved religious themes and a crisis of faith suffered by Frank Pembleton, whose Jesuit background mirrors that of Tom Fontana. The Waterfront Bar, which Lewis and Munch attempt to buy, was based on a real-life Baltimore bar often frequented by the Homicide cast after filming. According to Nielsen Media Research, the episode was seen by 7.63 million household viewers. It received generally positive reviews.

== Plot summary ==
Katherine Goodrich, who was previously named Baltimore's "Good Samaritan of the Year" for opening a women's emergency services shelter, is found dead in a dumpster near a Catholic church in the middle of the night, completely naked except for a pair of white cotton gloves. Megan Russert (Isabella Hofmann), a new shift commander with the homicide unit, is assigned to handle the investigation, but Colonel Granger (Gerald F. Gough) does not trust her with the politically volatile case and asks Giardello (Yaphet Kotto) to help her. Gee calls his detectives in to help Russert's. Pembleton (Andre Braugher) clashes with the foul-tempered Roger Gaffney (Walt MacPherson), the primary detective on the Goodrich case. Russert explains Goodrich was beaten to death and possibly raped, although the autopsy has not been completed yet. Russert's detectives voice their lack of respect for her based on her gender. Howard (Melissa Leo) vigorously defends Russert, but when the two meet later they do not get along.

Pembleton and Bayliss (Kyle Secor) question Sister Magdalena (Pamela Payton-Wright), who worked with Goodrich at the shelter. She claims one of the abusive boyfriends of a shelter victim recently threatened Goodrich. She also claims Goodrich never wore white gloves. Pembleton later tells Bayliss he is Catholic, but his faith has weakened over time. Gaffney believes the boyfriend is the likely killer, but Pembleton feels it was not a crime of passion, but of perversion, because the killer placed white gloves on the body. Gaffney calls Pembleton "boy", nearly leading to a fight until Russert intervenes. Meanwhile, Felton (Daniel Baldwin) is distraught because his wife Beth (Mary B. Ward) has thrown him out of the house and will not let him see their kids; he admits to Howard he is having an affair with another woman. Meanwhile, Lewis (Clark Johnson) and Munch (Richard Belzer) are in negotiations to buy a bar, but the owner will not lower her price and they must seek a third partner. They unsuccessfully pursue Bolander (Ned Beatty), but Bayliss later agrees to invest in the bar.

After several hours with no new developments, Russert is placed under further pressure when Matt Rhodes (Tony Todd), an aggressive television reporter, reveals he knows about the Goodrich murder and the white gloves. Russert claims if the white gloves are publicized, the detectives will lose their best lead, and convinces Rhodes to hold off by promising to give him the exclusive story later. Dr. Scheiner (Ralph Tabakin) finishes the autopsy and reveals Goodrich was not raped, surprising the detectives. Pembleton and Bayliss are sent to take another look at the crime scene. Gee tells an exhausted Russert to go home and rest, promising to cover for her. Russert does so and, shortly later, is visited by Felton; the two kiss, revealing Felton's affair is with Russert. Meanwhile, at the crime scene, Pembleton and Bayliss find the locked door to a nearby shed has been violently ripped open.

== Production ==
=== Casting ===
"Nearer My God to Thee" marked the debut of regular cast member Isabella Hofmann as Megan Russert, the police lieutenant in charge of the homicide department's second shift. When NBC committed to renew Homicide for a third season, among the requirements it mandated were the addition of more women to the cast. It was felt Hofmann would add sex appeal to the cast while also allowing gender politics to be integrated into the storylines. Homicide executive director Tom Fontana said, "Whether we added a woman, a man or a giraffe, we wanted it to be very organic to the show."

Russert was the first major Homicide character who was not based on a real-life Baltimore Police Department detective from Homicide: A Year on the Killing Streets, the 1991 non-fiction David Simon book from which the series was adapted. This marked one of several ways in which, starting with the third season, the Homicide series began to depart from the specifics of Simon's book and incorporate original characters and storylines not featured in that work. Hofmann was nervous about joining such an established ensemble cast and jealous that they had real-life detective models to discuss their roles with, while she had only technical advisers to consult. Hofman was living with Daniel Baldwin, her on-screen romantic interest, when she started her Homicide role, and the two later married. Russert was named after television journalist Tim Russert, who attended Canisius High School with Fontana.

Several other supporting characters were introduced in "Nearer My God to Thee" that would go on to make recurring appearances on the show, including Detectives Roger Gaffney and Willard Higby. Gaffney was played by Walt MacPherson, a Baltimore native who previously appeared in Tin Men (1987), a comedy film directed by Homicide executive director Barry Levinson. Higby, another detective from Russert's shift, was portrayed by actor Beau James.

=== Writing ===
"Nearer My God to Thee" begins a three-episode story arc about the "white glove murders", which continues into the episodes "Fits Like a Glove" and "Extreme Unction". The arc involves religious themes primarily revolving around a crisis of faith suffered by Pembleton, who was raised on Jesuit teachings but begins to question his belief in God amid the horrors of the white glove murders. The storyline stems from Tom Fontana's own real-life Jesuit education, something he also addressed in his prior television series, the medical drama St. Elsewhere. Fontana said, "Jesuit education is something I have deep affection for. I'm in a constant debate with God on how he runs the universe." The episode also includes other themes about morality issues, including extramarital affairs and poor police work. The murder of Catherine Goodrich is described as a "red ball", which is a police jargon phrase used to describe a high-profile case that draws such close media and political attention that it diverts time and attention away from other cases in the homicide department. The phrase was used frequently by real-life Baltimore Police Department detectives and came directly from Simon's Homicide: A Year on the Killing Streets.

Munch, Lewis and Bayliss discuss purchasing the Waterfront Bar, which became a common setting in Homicide starting in "Nearer My God to Thee". The Waterfront Bar was an actual Baltimore establishment near the Recreation Pier Building, a Fells Point location where Homicide's police department scenes are shot. The actors spent so much time at the Waterfront after filming that the owner, Mike Working, joked the bar should be on the show, which prompted Barry Levinson to ask the writers to work the setting into the series. Business at the real Waterfront increased by 20 percent after it was worked into the show. "Nearer My God to Thee" starts with a cold open featuring Bolander, Munch and Lewis watching television and discussing how network executives force producers to add gratuitous sex to their shows. Tom Fontana said this was a joke about NBC and the new requests they made for the show. It also refers to the fact that "Nearer My God to Thee" introduced more sexual content to the series, including the affair between Felton and Russert. Fontana said NBC Entertainment president Warren Littlefield called him to say he found the scene funny.

== Reception ==
=== Ratings ===
"Nearer My God to Thee" was the first original Homicide episode to air in eight months. It was the first to be featured in a new time slot of Friday at 10 p.m. EST, where it competed directly with the CBS drama series Picket Fences, which for the last two seasons had won the Primetime Emmy Award for Outstanding Drama Series. In its original American broadcast on October 14, 1994, the episode was watched by 7.63 million households, according to Nielsen Media Research, earning the episode an 8.0 rating. It was defeated in its timeslot by Picket Fences, which was seen by 10.49 million household viewers.

=== Reviews ===
The episode received generally positive reviews. Alan Pergament of The Buffalo News called "Nearer My God to Thee" a powerful opener for the season, calling it at least as strong as the recent second season premiere of NYPD Blue, a rival police drama series on ABC. He praised the religious themes and the "superb cast", particularly the performance of Andre Braugher, whom he called "an energetic actor with a magnetic presence". Larry Bonko, television columnist with The Virginian-Pilot, called the Homicide episode better than NYPD Blue's, which he also praised. Bonko called it "goose-pimply TV [that] falls into the category of TV that is too good for TV", particularly praised the witty dialogue and the performance of Ned Beatty and especially Braugher, who he said "steals this series away". David P. Kalat, author of Homicide: Life on the Street – The Unofficial Companion, called the white glove murders story arc an "attempt by Homicide to recapture the success of the Adena Watson storyline", a reference to the homicide case about an 11-year-old girl prominently featured throughout the first season.
