= Self Defense (Homicide: Life on the Street) =

- Homicide: Life on the Street episode
- Episode no.: Season 7 Episode 18
- Directed by: Barbara Kopple
- Written by: Lloyd Ross
- Cinematography by: Yaphet Kotto
- Production code: 718
- Original air date: April 9, 1999

Episode chronology
| ← Previous "Zen and the Art of Murder" | Next → "Lines of Fire" |
- Homicide: Life on the Street season 7

"Self Defense" is an episode of the seventh season of the American police drama television series Homicide: Life on the Street. It originally aired on NBC on April 9, 1999. The episode was directed by Barbara Kopple and written by cast member Yaphet Kotto, who also played as Lt. Al Giardello. The episode is significant in story arcs regarding the romance between detectives Laura Ballard and Paul Falsone and Lt. Giardello's difficulties in his attempts to get promoted to a captaincy.

== Plot summary ==
Eleanor Burke, the ex-wife of shooting victim Lorne Burke, admits to pulling the trigger, but plans on using battered person syndrome to bolster a self-defense claim. Despite overwhelming evidence against both claims (Eleanor had indeed been abused during the marriage, but they've been divorced for over a year, and Lorne had been shot while still reclined under the covers in bed), investigating officers Falsone and Terri Stivers discovered overwhelming political support for Eleanor, whose family connections, wealth, and job as an assistant U.S. attorney made her a sympathetic defendant in the eyes of the FBI, the police administration, and the federal and local Attorney's Offices. Ed Danvers conspires with Eleanor's attorney for a lenient outcome, but the judge imposes a stiff bail and orders the case before a jury. When Al Giardello attempts to convince the judge (who is an old friend) to reverse his decision, the judge instead convinces Gee that too many people are in Eleanor's corner, and somebody has to speak for the victim. Giardello's reversal on the matter puts a potential promotion in jeopardy. Meanwhile, Falsone and Stivers keep investigating and gradually convinced Danvers and Giardello — both of whom were sympathetic to Eleanor — that she is manipulating the law and thus damaging the credibility of a Battered Wife Syndrome.

In a parallel storyline, Laura accuses Det. Meldrick Lewis of sexism, and Lewis attempts to prove her wrong by partnering with her on a case involving a series of robberies at knife-point. Meanwhile, Falsone starts to regret breaking up with Laura when he discovers that she is not only dating medical examiner George Griscom, but she has also joined the M.E. bowling team. He took this as a personal insult, since he is the one who taught her how to bowl. Falsone even goes far as to spy on one of their bowling nights, which Laura seems to thoroughly enjoy.

Detective Stuart Gharty proposed to Billie Lou when drunk, but she declined and mentioned her engagement to Detective John Munch.
