= Homicide: Life on the Street season 5 =

Homicide: Life on the Street
- Season 5
- Season 5 U.S. DVD cover
- Starring: Richard Belzer; Andre Braugher; Reed Diamond; Michelle Forbes; Clark Johnson; Yaphet Kotto; Melissa Leo; Max Perlich; Kyle Secor
- No. of episodes: 22

Release
- Original network: NBC
- Original release: September 20, 1996 – May 16, 1997

Season chronology
- ← Previous; Season 4 Next → Season 6

The fifth season of Homicide: Life on the Street aired in the United States on the NBC television network from 20 September 1996 to 16 May 1997 and contained 22 episodes. A new opening sequence debuted with the start of this season, including elements of a police investigation (murder weapon, dusting for fingerprints, etc.) and a growing chatter of radio transmissions behind the theme music. In addition, pictures of the actors were displayed alongside their names for the first time. The sequence ends with the ringing of the squadroom phone and a voice answering, "Homicide."

Two new characters appeared during this season: Chief Medical Examiner Julianna Cox (a regular character portrayed by Michelle Forbes); and Detective Terri Stivers (a recurring character portrayed by guest star Toni Lewis), a Narcotics officer who works with Homicide to bring down local drug kingpin Luther Mahoney.

The two-part season finale introduced Detective Paul Falsone (portrayed by Jon Seda), a member of the Auto Squad briefly on loan to Homicide, re-introduced Stuart Gharty (portrayed by Peter Gerety), now a detective assigned to Internal Investigations, and marked the return of Detective Megan Russert (Isabella Hofmann) from her season-long leave of absence in France. It also marked the final regular appearances of Sgt. Kay Howard (Melissa Leo) and unit videographer J. H. Brodie (Max Perlich).

The DVD box set of season 5 was released for Region 1 on September 28, 2004. The set includes all 22 season 5 episodes on six discs.

== Episodes ==
No. overall	No. in season	Title	Directed by	Written by	Original release date	Prod. code	U.S. viewers (millions)
56	1	"Hostage, Part 1"	Ted Demme	Story by : Tom Fontana & Julie Martin; Teleplay by : James Yoshimura	September 20, 1996	501	12.3
Pembleton returns to duty over the objections of the top brass, who want him shipped to a position with no responsibilities, but he has trouble coping with the physical and mental limitations placed on him by his stroke recovery. Gee learns that Russert might have moved to France to live with a diplomat whose baby she is carrying, while Bolander retired and Felton's whereabouts are unknown. With Pembleton on desk duty, this leaves the unit understaffed. Bayliss and Munch team up on the shooting death of a Mrs. Uba, with a pet pig as the only witness. As they begin to track down her son, who owns the pig, a gunman invades a middle school and takes a classroom hostage after killing two staff members. Most of the homicide unit is called in to assist.
57	2	"Hostage, Part 2"	Jean De Segonzac	Story by : Tom Fontana & James Yoshimura; Teleplay by : Julie Martin	September 27, 1996	502	11.7
The middle school gunman demands that his pet pig be brought to him, then shoots and critically injures a female student and sets the classroom on fire after the police fail to do so in a short amount of time. After the hostages are rescued and he is taken to the hospital with severe burns, the squad connects this incident with Mrs. Uba's murder and realizes that her son Gerry committed both crimes. The injured student dies, and Gee is furious when D. A. Danvers initially holds off on charging him with multiple first-degree murder charges because the state will save money by waiting to charge the incapacitated perpetrator after he's released from the hospital. Meanwhile, Danvers gets engaged, Pembleton stops taking his medication after discovering its effects on his mental focus and sexual relations with Mary, and Munch learns that Brodie has been evicted and offers to let him move in. Guest star: Anne Meara as teacher Donna DiGrazi (nominated at 49th Emmy Award)
58	3	"Prison Riot"	Kenneth Fink	Story by : Tom Fontana & Henry Bromell; Teleplay by : Tom Fontana	October 18, 1996	503	9.8
At the state penitentiary, a cafeteria scuffle turns into a riot that leaves two inmates dead, as one of them killed the other. The whole squad (except for Pembleton) starts to investigate, looking for the second killer, but no one – including several murderers apprehended in previous episodes – is willing to provide any information. Gee orders the detectives to drop the case, which leads to Howard covering for Bayliss and Kellerman as they continue their investigation. Bayliss concentrates on inmate Elijah Sanborn, a man who became a murderer to avenge his wife. Bayliss attempts to use the news of his son's recent arrest and a visitation from his daughter as leverage to get the facts. Sanborn confesses to the murder in hopes of reducing his son's sentence as part of a deal, but the truth comes out after a second assault occurs in the prison. A man who the detectives had put away for murdering his girlfriend tells them he attacked the killer they're looking for because the victim was his prison lover. Meanwhile, Pembleton begins target practice in hopes of qualifying on the firing range so he can return to full duty. His behavior tips Brody off that he stopped taking his medication. Guest stars: Charles S. Dutton as Elijah Sanborn, Dean Winters as Tom Marans In 1997, TV Guide ranked this episode #32 on its list of the 100 Greatest Episodes.
59	4	"Bad Medicine"	Kenneth Fink	Story by : Tom Fontana & Julie Martin; Teleplay by : David Simon	October 25, 1996	504	10.8
Drug addicts all over Baltimore are dying from a batch of adulterated heroin, sold by a dealer in competition with Luther Mahoney. After the dealer is found murdered, narcotics detective Terri Stivers works with the homicide unit to build a conspiracy case against Mahoney and cut off the supply of bad drugs at the same time. The case falls apart when Danvers insists that there isn't enough evidence to indict Mahoney. The only witness, Stivers' informant, is killed soon after. Kellerman is put on desk duty after the entire arson unit becomes the target of a federal investigation for corruption. Pembleton fails his firearms test and begins taking his medication again, and Brodie moves in with Bayliss after Munch throws him out. First appearance of Det. Terri Stivers
60	5	"M.E., Myself and I"	Michael Fields	Story by : Tom Fontana; Teleplay by : Lyle Weldon & Emily Whitesell	November 1, 1996	505	10.5
Dr. Julianna Cox arrives in Baltimore to begin work as Chief Medical Examiner and look after her ailing father, who soon dies due to his illness after refusing to go to the hospital. The FBI begins to question the Arson Unit detectives as part of the corruption investigation, setting Kellerman's nerves on edge. Gee allows one of the FBI agents to conduct interviews with his unit in the Box. As Bayliss and Lewis probe the death of a prostitute, a homeless man quickly confesses to both her murder and that of a second woman whose name never appeared on the Board. With help from the detectives, Cox learns that one of her staff members deliberately misclassified the earlier death as an overdose, then fires him. Bayliss throws Brodie out for being pretentious, whereupon he moves in with Lewis and inadvertently sets off an argument that may end Lewis' marriage. Guest star: Edward Herrmann as FBI Agent Thomas Pandolfi First appearance of C.M.E. Julianna Cox
61	6	"White Lies"	Peter Weller	Story by : Tom Fontana & James Yoshimura; Teleplay by : Anya Epstein	November 8, 1996	506	11.2
When an article on the corruption probe appears in The Baltimore Sun, Kellerman loses his temper and confronts Mitch Roland, the businessman who had been a suspect in the arson/murders that brought him into the homicide unit. Both of them take polygraph exams, but the results prove inconclusive after they both pass the test. Munch investigates the seemingly inexplicable death of a young woman, which continually frustrates him until Cox discovers the cause – a heroin overdose. The husband blamed himself for leaving the victim alone and disguised her death as an accident. Examining an old file, Pembleton's tenacity leads to a partial fingerprint that gives Bayliss a chance to clear his only open case of the year. Bayliss fails to obtain a confession from the suspect, which Pembleton believes he would have managed to extract before his illness. Mourning his old life, Pembleton ends the day by visiting the Box and reliving his glory days. After being thrown out by Lewis, Brodie turns down Howard's offer to stay with her, insisting that he doesn't want to jeopardize her reputation.
62	7	"The Heart of a Saturday Night"	Whit Stillman	Henry Bromell	November 15, 1996	507	11.0
At a support group meeting for family members of murder victims, three of the squad's cases are described: a carjacking in which a young mother is shot (worked by Lewis and Munch), a brawl at the Waterfront bar that leaves a man dead (Gee), and a teenage girl found strangled and dumped in an alley (Bayliss). Gee and Bayliss both close their cases, the latter with Pembleton's help. One was an accident while the other was a murder committed by a pedophile, with confessions obtained in both cases. Lewis works his case hard with little hope of catching the perpetrators, but the kidnapped child in the back of the stolen car is found safe and sound. Cox arrives late to the meeting and reveals that while her father was suffering from a terminal illness, he actually died of injuries when he was the victim of a hit-and-run car accident. Guest star: Rosanna Arquette as Caroline Widmer
63	8	"The True Test"	Alan Taylor	Story by : Tom Fontana & Noel Behn; Teleplay by : Noel Behn	November 22, 1996	508	13.0
Lewis and Bayliss work the murder of an African-American student at an exclusive, nearly all-white prep school. The case takes a political turn when their focus shifts to an arrogant, manipulative student named McPhee Broadman whose mother is a hardline Baltimore court judge. One of the victim's roommates confesses to the crime, but the detectives continue working to uncover the rest of the facts. Bayliss finds the case personal due to his cousin's rejection from the school and empathy for the bullied younger children under McPhee's control. Realizing that McPhee is responsible for many of the past covered-up incidents at the school, the detectives manage to get him to confess that he asked the victim to kill Judge Broadman and that he was murdered for refusing. Judge Broadman witnesses this exchange in the observation room, but continues to support her son. Reinstated to full duty after a successful firearms exam, Pembleton wonders if he can trust himself to enter the Box again. Kellerman meets Cox for the first time, offers Brodie a place to stay on his boat, and learns that several members of the arson unit might have struck plea deals to testify against him — even though they were all corrupt and he wasn't involved. Guest star: Elijah Wood as McPhee "Cheeks" Broadman
64	9	"Control"	Jean De Segonzac	Story by : Tom Fontana & Julie Martin; Teleplay by : Les Carter & Susan Sisko	December 6, 1996	509	12.1
With Bayliss as primary, Pembleton takes his first case since returning to duty: the murders of a woman and her two sons in their own home. The detectives have different theories about the case, with Pembleton favoring the woman's boyfriend and Bayliss focusing on her ex-husband. They have trouble following each other's leads, but eventually work together in the Box to catch the killer. A witness at a drug dealer's shooting points Lewis and Munch to Junior Bunk, Luther Mahoney's nephew, who readily incriminates Mahoney but is then intimidated into recanting his statement. Brodie gets evicted from Kellerman's boat, then tries and fails to talk both Gee and Russert into giving him a room. Kellerman receives a grand jury summons and spends the night with Cox. Guest star: Mekhi Phifer as Junior Bunk Isabella Hofmann, as Russert, is heard over the phone.
65	10	"Blood Wedding"	Kevin Hooks	Story by : Tom Fontana & James Yoshimura; Teleplay by : Matt Witten	December 13, 1996	510	11.6
When Danvers' fiancee is killed in a bridal shop robbery, Pembleton takes the case, his first as primary since his stroke. Danvers meddles in the investigation and insists that it be assigned to another detective, but Gee refuses to do so. A suspect is brought in and interrogated, then hangs himself after a distraught Danvers confronts him. Cox tells Kellerman that she does not want a relationship with him, sending him into a depression that only lifts somewhat after he learns that the grand jury has been postponed. Gee learns that there will be no high-level support for his detective, and also that an incompetent racist like Gaffney was promoted to captain over him as a reminder of his past failure to support the department. Brodie is thrown out of the morgue after sleeping there overnight. Guest star: Al Freeman, Jr. as Deputy Commissioner James Harris
66	11	"The Documentary"	Barbara Kopple	Story by : Tom Fontana & James Yoshimura & Eric Overmyer; Teleplay by : Eric Overmyer	January 3, 1997	511	11.54
Brodie takes advantage of an unexpectedly quiet New Year's Eve to present the detectives with a documentary he has made on the inner workings of the homicide unit. The film reveals facts that everyone would prefer to keep private, including a case in which the killer has some bizarre personal habits, and captures a foot chase that runs right through a film shoot headed by director Barry Levinson. The identity of last season's "Lunch Bandit" is exposed - none other than Gaffney - and Cox and Kellerman decide to try to start a relationship. Brodie shocks the detectives with news that he has sold the documentary to PBS as the clock strikes midnight and the phones begin to ring. Guest stars: Melvin Van Peebles as Bennett Jackson, Barry Levinson as himself
67	12	"Betrayal"	Clark Johnson	Story by : Tom Fontana & Julie Martin; Teleplay by : Gay Walch	January 10, 1997	512	13.67
Bayliss becomes the primary in the case of an abused young girl whose body was dumped along I-95. His bad experience with child victims affects his mind so severely that Pembleton has trouble keeping him under control long enough to close the case, and he is distraught when Pembleton helps the girl's mother avoid full responsibility for her child's death. Afterward, Bayliss reveals to Pembleton the reason he has trouble with these cases - his uncle sexually molested him as a child, and his father did nothing to protect him - and says that he no longer wants to partner with Pembleton. Brodie finally finds a roommate, and Kellerman testifies before the grand jury; although he is cleared of the corruption allegations, he believes that the other detectives will always regard him as dirty.
68	13	"Have a Conscience"	Uli Edel	James Yoshimura	January 17, 1997	513	13.85
Kellerman returns to duty after his suspension, still bearing resentment toward the press and his colleagues over the corruption probe. His first case - a Korean shopkeeper shot to death in the doorway of his own store - appears to be the work of Luther Mahoney, but it falls apart due to a lack of evidence and witnesses. Kellerman's frustration leads him to consider suicide; Lewis is able to talk him out of it, remembering how Crosetti took his own life without asking for any help. Bayliss maintains his split from Pembleton, leaving the latter to close an old case on his own.
69	14	"Diener"	Kyle Secor	Story by : Tom Fontana & Julie Martin; Teleplay by : Christopher Kyle	January 31, 1997	514	11.45
With Bayliss working alone and Kellerman taking time off, Pembleton and Lewis reluctantly partner up to work the bludgeoning death of a wealthy middle aged woman. They concentrate on her brother, but the case stalls when he claims that her diamond ring has been stolen by the police. Cox realizes that victims' jewelry has gone missing in several other cases, so she and Brodie set up cameras in the morgue to catch the thief - one of her staff members, who is quickly fired and arrested. Mary suggests that she and Pembleton seek marriage counseling without success, then later asks Bayliss to resume working with him; Bayliss tries to do so, but Pembleton declines.
70	15	"Wu's on First?"	Tim McCann	Story by : James Yoshimura & Julie Martin; Teleplay by : David Simon & Anya Epstein	February 7, 1997	515	11.57
Elizabeth Wu, the new police reporter for The Baltimore Sun, becomes an annoyance to the homicide unit as Pembleton investigates the case of an off-duty police officer killed after a drug buy. After she mistakenly destroys the victim's reputation and leads the detectives to her source (who turns out to be the shooter), Barnfather takes advantage of a press conference to get her thrown off the police beat. Meanwhile, Kellerman gets an unwelcome surprise visit from his two delinquent elder brothers, who are on the run from bookies in Cleveland and have stolen Babe Ruth's Baltimore Orioles uniform to pay off their debt. Guest stars: Joan Chen as Elizabeth Wu, Eric Stoltz as Drew Kellerman, Tate Donovan as Greg Kellerman. Diamond, Stoltz and Donovan all played crew members in Memphis Belle.
71	16	"Valentine's Day"	Clark Johnson	Tom Fontana	February 14, 1997	516	10.05
After a man is found dead in the apartment of one of Brodie's graduate school classmates, Munch is ready to write it off as a suicide, but Brodie refuses to let him drop the matter. Munch and Howard investigate further and, with Brodie's help, lay a trap that exposes the classmate as a murderer. Kellerman and Bayliss uncover the connection between a pair of bombing deaths - the trial of the man who killed the Korean shopkeeper in "Have a Conscience" - and race to stop the perpetrator from completing a campaign of revenge against those responsible for his acquittal. Marriage counseling for Pembleton and Mary only leads to worsening arguments between them, and after he misses Olivia's baptism, Mary takes her and moves out. Guest star: Neil Patrick Harris as Alan Schack
72	17	"Kaddish"	Jean De Segonzac	Story by : Julie Martin & James Yoshimura & Ron Goldstein; Teleplay by : Linda McGibney	February 21, 1997	517	10.95
The strangulation death of a woman in a parking garage stirs up childhood memories for Munch, since she, her ex-husband, and her current boyfriend all attended high school with him. As he and Kellerman work the case, which shows connections with a series of recent attacks on other women, the Jewish rituals surrounding the burial cause him to think about his own lapse of faith. After Pembleton's interrogation skills fail him in the Box, he looks in vain for comfort in a dinner with Bayliss and attendance at morning Mass, then goes on a call with Bayliss.
73	18	"Double Blind"	Uli Edel	Story by : Tom Fontana & James Yoshimura; Teleplay by : Lee Blessing & Jeanne Blake	April 11, 1997	518	11.49
Charlie Flavin, the man who shot and blinded Officer Chris Thormann four years ago, has become eligible for parole, and the news has left Thormann unable to think about anything else. His wife and Lewis try to help him past this moment; at the parole hearing, Thormann makes a statement that results in Flavin being put away for another five years. While investigating the death of an abusive husband at his daughter's hands, Bayliss and Pembleton sharply disagree over the question of whether abuse victims deserve any blame for not leaving their abusers. Bayliss later confronts the uncle who molested him as a child; the uncle is disabled and barely able to speak, but Bayliss asks him "Where do I put my hate?". Kellerman spends time with Cox and reveals that he had been considering suicide. Guest stars: Lee Tergesen as Chris Thormann, Edie Falco as Eva Thormann
74	19	"Deception"	Peter Medak	Story by : Tom Fontana & Julie Martin & James Yoshimura; Teleplay by : Debbie Sarjeant	April 25, 1997	519	9.91
The death of a Nigerian drug courier brings the homicide and narcotics units together in a plan to smash Luther Mahoney's organization. Mahoney shoots one of his own men and a bystander in a panic and is then executed by Kellerman in cold blood, with Lewis and Stivers also on the scene. All three write up the incident as a case of self-defense. An ex-convict calls Munch with information on an old murder; this turns out to be a ruse so he can find the "victim" and kill him. Bayliss agrees to re-partner with Pembleton, then slips out without telling anyone to take care of his uncle. Guest star: Lewis Black as Lazlo "Punchy" DeLeon
75	20	"Narcissus"	Jean De Segonzac	Yaphet Kotto	May 2, 1997	520	10.47
A murder suspect fleeing from police takes shelter at the headquarters of the African Revival Movement. Interference by both Barnfather and Gaffney leads the unit to realize that someone is pulling strings to stall them. That person is ARM leader Burundi Robinson, who initiates an armed standoff when the police try to serve an arrest warrant. He tells Gee about his time on the force, serving with Deputy Commissioner Harris and losing his job due to Harris' misconduct after a drug bust. Robinson and 15 ARM members commit suicide before they can be apprehended, and Gee promises to expose Harris' illegal acts. Bayliss is nowhere to be found until the standoff is nearly over, and Stivers voices her worries about the Mahoney shooting to Kellerman and Lewis. Guest star: Roger Robinson as Burundi Robinson
76	21	"Partners and Other Strangers"	Leslie Libman & Larry Williams	Anya Epstein & Julie Martin & Darryl LeMont Wharton	May 9, 1997	521	10.85
Pembleton responds to a shooting call and is shocked to find that the victim is Beau Felton, who has apparently committed suicide. Auto Squad detective Paul Falsone visits the squad room and voices his theory that Felton was leaking information to a car theft ring he was trying to bust. Cox's autopsy reveals that Felton was in fact murdered, and Gee learns that Stuart Gharty (now a detective working in Internal Investigations) sent Felton into the ring undercover to find the leak--a fact that enrages Howard, who remembers how his previous cowardice resulted in the deaths of two men and had hoped he would retire from the BPD. Russert returns from France to help with the investigation. Lewis tries to settle Stivers' mind over the Mahoney shooting, and Pembleton finds out that Bayliss has been taking care of his uncle in order to forgive him. Kellerman and Cox spend another night together. Giardello ignores Gaffney's insults over Harris' resignation, recognizing them as scared bluster from the captain. Guest stars: first appearance of Jon Seda as Det. Paul Falsone; return of Peter Gerety as Det. (formerly Patrolman) Stuart Gharty; return of Isabella Hofmann as Det. Megan Russert from the character's season-long leave of absence in France; Scott William Winters as Eddie Dugan.
77	22	"Strangers and Other Partners"	Kenneth Fink	David Simon & Tom Fontana & James Yoshimura	May 16, 1997	522	11.09
Gee brings Falsone and Gharty in on the Felton murder, irritating the rest of the detectives at first, but Pembleton relents somewhat after Gharty reveals that he took a beating while serving an arrest warrant to prove he was no longer a coward. Howard and Russert are taken off the case so they can plan the funeral, since they are both too emotionally involved. Falsone and Gharty realize that they have been using the same informant, who brought Felton into the car theft ring, then blew his cover and set him up to be killed by its leader. By the time the unit raids the hideout, though, everyone in the ring has disappeared. A hung-over Kellerman argues with Cox and annoys Lewis by losing track of a witness for a case they are working. Pembleton reconciles with Mary, now six months pregnant, and she agrees to move back home. After a ceremony in Felton's honor, Gee learns that the department is starting a rotation program that may scatter his detectives. Guest stars: Jon Seda as Det. Paul Falsone; Peter Gerety as Det. Stuart Gharty; Scott William Winters as Eddie Dugan; Isabella Hofmann as Det. Megan Russert; then Baltimore Mayor Kurt L. Schmoke as himself; then Governor of Maryland Parris Glendening as himself. Final appearances of Sgt. Kay Howard and J. H. Brodie
