= Lines of Fire =

- Homicide: Life on the Street episode
- Episode no.: Season 7 Episode 20
- Directed by: Kathryn Bigelow
- Written by: James Yoshimura
- Cinematography by: Alex Zakrzewski
- Production code: 720
- Original air date: May 7, 1999

Guest appearances
- Ron Eldard as Emmet Carey; Gary D'Addario as Lt. Jasper

Episode chronology
← Previous "Identity Crisis"	Next → "The Why Chromosome"
- Homicide: Life on the Street season 7

"Lines of Fire" is an episode of the seventh season of the American police drama television series Homicide: Life on the Street. It originally aired on NBC on May 7, 1999. The episode was written by James Yoshimura and directed by Kathryn Bigelow.

== Plot summary ==
Mike Giardello and Stuart Gharty are ordered to investigate when Emmet Carey, a man who has recently lost both his job and a child custody battle, takes his children hostage on a top-floor apartment of a Baltimore high rise. Emmet sees Mike on television when news cameras report to the scene, and develops an immediate fixation on him. The usual hostage negotiator asks Mike to take over, after the otherwise paranoid Emmet shows signs of trusting Mike.

Emmet initially mocks Mike's mixed racial heritage, saying that he's "never seen a black Italian" but the two eventually develop a rapport as they tell each other about their lives, and Mike repeatedly agrees to Emmet's demands for food. However, Emmet shows signs of paranoia and grows increasingly suspicious as Mike stalls for time to avoid fulfilling Emmet's primary demand—a chance to speak to his ex-wife and former boss; Emmet's ex has shown such contempt for Emmet, that Mike knows such a conversation would inevitably lead to violence. In fact, when the ex eventually breaks through the security perimeter, Emmet loses his temper and fires his gun wildly. His intention is only to scare her, but he accidentally hits her with a fatal shot. The hostage negotiator encourages Mike to tell Emmet that his ex received only a minor wound, as news of her death might further antagonize him.

Mike eventually manages to convince Emmet to release his daughter, but immediately afterward, Emmet kills his son and then himself, leaving Mike devastated that he was unable to save the little boy.

== Notes ==
Regular characters Al Giardello, John Munch, Paul Falsone, Rene Sheppard, Terri Stivers and Laura Ballard do not appear in this episode.

The episode was originally planned for airing on April 30, 1999, but NBC moved it back one week to put more distance between the show's gunman/hostage story and the Columbine massacre. A minor continuity error occurs involving Mike Giardello's character, since he resigns from the FBI in "Identity Crisis" (the episode moved into the 4/30 spot). In this episode, he is referred to as "Officer Giardello."
