= Zen and the Art of Murder =

- Homicide: Life on the Street episode
- Episode no.: Season 7 Episode 17
- Directed by: Miguel Arteta
- Written by: Lloyd Rose
- Cinematography by: Alex Zakrzewski
- Production code: 717
- Original air date: April 2, 1999

Episode chronology
← Previous "Truth Will Out"	Next → "Self Defense"
- Homicide: Life on the Street season 7

"Zen and the Art of Murder" is an episode of the seventh season of the American police drama television series Homicide: Life on the Street. It originally aired on NBC on April 2, 1999. The episode was written by Lloyd Rose and directed by Miguel Arteta. The episode is significant in the story arc of Laura Ballard's romance with Paul Falsone; fearful that their secret romance will be discovered, Falsone ends the relationship.

== Plot summary ==
A spoon is the only trace of evidence left over after John Munch and Meldrick Lewis find a well-respected Buddhist monk bludgeoned to death. Because Det. Tim Bayliss has become active in Baltimore's Buddhist community, Lt. Al Giardello orders him to join the investigation; as a result, Bayliss replaces Munch—a move that frustrates Lewis, who rightfully points out that Bayliss, who knew and respected the victim, tends to lose professional perspective in cases which involve an emotional investment.

Bayliss and Lewis immediately clash in the investigation: Upon learning that the victim often worked with the homeless, Bayliss immediately intuits that a homeless person killed the monk, while Meldrick is convinced that the monk was murdered by one of the monks who lived with the victim, since they would have had greater access. Bayliss objects that Buddhists are, by their very nature, non-violent, but Meldrick dismisses this as bias. When a witness claims to have seen a mysterious black man lurking around the house, Meldrick is offended that Bayliss chooses to pursue the lead, which Meldrick sees as nothing but "some housewife's racist fantasy." This disagreement motivates Bayliss and Lewis to split up, each pursuing the investigation according to his theory.

While Meldrick continues to interview the victim's fellow monks, searching for a motive, Bayliss searches for Larry Moss, a homeless man who fits the eyewitness's description, and encounters him by chance on the street. Bayliss pursues Moss into an abandoned building, where Moss reveals his paranoid motivation for killing the monk: the monk had offered him a spoon at a soup kitchen, and Moss interpreted the casual act of kindness as an act of disrespect, since, in Moss's words, "I can get my own damn spoon!" Bayliss is forced to kill Moss when Moss starts shooting at him. Although everyone tells Bayliss that it was a "clean shoot," Bayliss is devastated by his actions. He is not comforted by a contrite Lewis' apologies for assumption and statement that Bayliss' emotional approach to the job has actually made him a good cop, and says he is left without any identity as he is no longer worthy of being a Buddhist.

In a parallel investigation, Det. Laura Ballard and Det. Stuart Gharty respond to a street shooting witnessed by the victim's mother, sister, and neighbor. The sister identifies the shooter as a local hood named "either Jacko or Jocko," but when Ballard and Gharty track Jacko down, the neighbor who witnessed the shooting mistakenly insists that Jacko is not the man who shot Williams. The cops know that Jacko did it but when he gives an alibi for being in another location, they are unable to prove he is lying because the timeline for running between the two locations is unclear. In the end, to the horror of the victim's family, Jacko gets away with murder.
