= J. H. Brodie =

- J. H. Brodie
- First appearance: November 3, 1995, (4x03, "Autofocus") (Recurring); September 20, 1996, (5x01, Hostage (1)) (Regular)
- Last appearance: May 16, 1997, (5x22, Strangers and Other Partners) (HLOTS); February 13, 2000, Homicide: The Movie
- Created by: Tom Fontana
- Portrayed by: Max Perlich

In-universe information
- Gender: Male
- Occupation: Crime Scene Recorder (formerly)

J. H. Brodie is a fictional character in the television series Homicide: Life on the Street. He appeared in a recurring role in the show's fourth season and was a regular in the show's fifth season, after becoming an official crime scene videographer.

== Professional life ==
Brodie first appeared as a cameraman for a local news station, often intruding on crime scenes or getting in the way of investigating police in order to get the most dramatic shots possible. Upon discovering that some of his footage showed a murder suspect the homicide unit was trying to track down, he turned it over to the detectives instead of giving it to his boss for use on that night's broadcast. His decision allowed the unit to close the case, but cost him his job.

Recognizing Brodie's sacrifice, Lt. Al Giardello and Capt. Megan Russert offered him a job as videographer for the homicide unit, shooting footage of crime scenes and interviews for later use in court. He continued to film other subjects for his own amusement, eventually constructing a documentary about the unit that was revealed in the episode "The Documentary." At the end of the episode, when Giardello asked Brodie for the master copy in order to prevent any embarrassment to the detectives, Brodie revealed that he had already sold the film to PBS.

Being young, shy and prone to getting caught underfoot, Brodie found himself struggling to gain respect in the office, something that bothered him throughout his time at the station. However, he would occasionally surprise the detectives by chipping in with some observation that they had missed. At one point, he correctly deduced that Det. Frank Pembleton had stopped taking his stroke medication (which he realized because his own mother had suffered a stroke). Caught off-guard, Pembleton noted that he had underestimated Brodie. "Most people do," the cameraman replied. In Season 5, he insisted that Det. John Munch not write off a shooting death as a suicide, believing that an arrogant graduate school classmate of his had to have been involved. Munch and Sgt. Kay Howard investigated and began to share Brodie's suspicions, and he fabricated some video evidence that helped the detectives trick the classmate into exposing himself as a murderer.

Brodie left the squad between the fifth and sixth seasons; after his documentary won an Emmy, he moved to Los Angeles to develop his career. He next appeared in Homicide: The Movie, the TV movie that capped off the series, when he returned to Baltimore to visit Gee, who had been shot. His role in the film was small, and he spent most of his time off-camera, recording an operation. However, he had a pivotal scene at the very end of the film, when he informed the squad that Gee had died while in the hospital.

== Personal life ==
Brodie's quiet personality, coupled with his passion for serious film-makers and documentary directors, set him apart from most of the squad, who saw him as something of a nebbish. A humorous running storyline throughout season five saw Brodie kicked out of his apartment and being shipped from one detective's house to the next, upsetting each one in turn: John Munch was horrified to learn that Brodie had looked in his medicine cabinet (it is implied that he stored cannabis in there), Tim Bayliss objected to Brodie's highbrow taste in television and Meldrick Lewis was annoyed when Brodie instigated an argument with his wife.

Brodie eventually ended up sleeping in the squad's video room. Kay Howard found out and offered him a place at hers, but Brodie turned her down because of an intense crush he harbored on her. Eventually, he moved in with an attractive blonde girl of his own age, and it was implied in several episodes that she had become his girlfriend.

David Simon, who Brodie is based on, is Jewish, and although Brodie's religion was never really discussed, in the episode "Kaddish", he was shown to have an intimate knowledge of the Jewish religion, suggesting that he is Jewish himself.
