= Russert =

Russert is a surname. Notable people with the surname include:

- Tim Russert (1950–2008), American journalist
- Luke Russert (born 1985), American journalist, son of Tim
- Megan Russert, fictional Baltimore homicide detective (and fictionally a relative of the real Tim Russert)
