= Corky (film) =

1972 film by Leonard Horn

- Film poster
- Directed by: Leonard Horn
- Written by: Eugene Price
- Produced by: Bruce Geller
- Starring: Robert Blake; Charlotte Rampling; Patrick O'Neal; Cale Yarborough; Bobby Allison; Donnie Allison; Buddy Baker; Richard Petty
- Cinematography: David M. Walsh
- Edited by: Hugh S. Fowler; Albert P. Wilson
- Music by: John Carl Parker (as John Parker); Jerry Styner
- Distributed by: Metro-Goldwyn-Mayer
- Release date: March 15, 1972 (U.S.)
- Running time: 88 minutes
- Country: United States
- Language: English

Corky is a 1972 American drama film starring Robert Blake and directed by Leonard Horn.

== Plot ==
Corky Curtiss is a Texas race-car mechanic obsessed with the sport. He is permitted to drive in local races on weekends, but his boss, Randy Dover, replaces him with another driver because of his costly, reckless ways.

With little money to support his wife, Peggy Jo, and two kids, Corky needs his job but can't control his resentment. He enters a race on a figure-eight track and deliberately causes a crash that sends replacement driver Steve to the hospital. A furious Randy fires Corky from his mechanic job.

Corky abandons his wife and heads for Georgia in his pink Plymouth Barracuda with a friend, Billy. He enters and wins a small race along the way but drinks and gambles away the prize money at a roadhouse.

A sympathetic Randy realizes that Peggy Jo has been left with no money and prospects, so he gives her Corky's back wages plus a job. She also finds a second job and takes classes trying to earn a high school diploma.

By the time Corky reaches Atlanta, he is almost dead broke and is not given a chance to drive at the speedway. Selling his tires, Corky picks a fight with a junkyard owner who sics attack dogs on him. He also insults passersby who offer assistance to his disabled vehicle. Billy objects to his behavior, then leaves with the strangers when Corky punches him.

Back home in Texas, penniless and despondent, Corky realizes that his wife has begun working for Randy and accuses her of having an affair. He goes to the garage with a gun and shoots a couple of Randy's mechanics. Trying to flee from police, the pink car bursts into flames with Corky inside. His last thoughts are fantasies of being a famous race driver.

== Cast ==
- Robert Blake as Corky Curtiss
- Charlotte Rampling as Peggy Jo Curtiss
- Patrick O'Neal as Randy Dover
- Christopher Connelly as Billy
- Pamela Payton-Wright as Rhonda
- Ben Johnson as Boland
- Laurence Luckinbill as Wayne Nesbitt
- Paul Stevens as Tobin Hayes
- Bobby Allison as himself
- Donnie Allison as himself
- Buddy Baker as himself
- Richard Petty as himself
- Cale Yarborough as himself
- Charlie Briggs as Red
- Jack Garner as Driver
- Lulu Roman as Sue
- John Marriott as Junkman
- Glen Wood as himself

== Production ==
Producer Bruce Geller was so upset at post-production changes made to the film by MGM management that he asked for his name to be taken off the film. This was refused.

== Reception ==
Paul Mavis, of Movies and Drinks, reviewing the Warner Archive Collection 2014 DVD release of Corky, wrote, "An oppressively fatalistic look at a sh*tty little loser. Corky's audience appeal is completely perverse: let's watch a character we wouldn't be caught dead near, spiral down into a nightmarish hole of his own making, with absolutely no chance of his achieving understanding or redemption. It's a powerful vision—it's just too bad it wasn't a bit deeper. Still, Blake's performance is remarkably in tune with the dark, well-detailed proceedings."

== See also ==
- List of American films of 1972
