= Plain Clothes (1988 film) =

1988 film by Martha Coolidge

- Home video release poster
- Directed by: Martha Coolidge
- Screenplay by: Scott Frank
- Story by: Dan Vining; Scott Frank
- Produced by: Michael Manheim; Richard Wechsler; Steven-Charles Jaffe (executive)
- Starring: Arliss Howard; Suzy Amis; George Wendt; Diane Ladd; Seymour Cassel; Abe Vigoda; Robert Stack
- Cinematography: Daniel Hainey
- Edited by: Edward M. Abroms; Patrick Kennedy
- Music by: Scott Wilk
- Distributed by: Paramount Pictures
- Release date: April 15, 1988
- Running time: 98 minutes
- Country: United States
- Language: English
- Budget: $7.5 million
- Box office: $289,323

Plain Clothes is a 1988 American comedy film directed by Martha Coolidge and starring Arliss Howard. The film was a box-office bomb, has mixed reviews and pulled from theatres after a very short and limited release.

== Plot ==
Undercover cop Nick Dunbar's brother Matt is accused of killing his teacher, Mr. Bradwood, at Adlai Stevenson High School. Nick loses his temper with Hechtor, the detective in charge, and gets suspended. Nick's partner Ed pretends to be the (24-year-old) Nick's dad to enroll him as a student. Matt gives Nick pointers to get people to talk to him. Nick deals with bullies, girls with crushes on him, teachers and staff who range from quirky to bizarre, and a teacher, Robin Torrence, to whom he is attracted who thinks he is a teen. The turning point in his popularity (and therefore his ability to get information) happens in the classroom metaphor scene, in which E.E. Cummings' poem she being brand new, is used in its entirety.

Along the way, Nick and Ed narrow the probable motives down to jealousy (Bradwood was trading grades for sex with Daun-Marie Zeffer, the girlfriend of Kyle Kerns, the leader of the bullies) or self-preservation (Bradwood was blackmailing some staff about running a real estate scam on the other teachers). Nick's identity is discovered by Jane Melway, one of the con artist's gang, and it all comes to a head at the school's May Fest. Nick and Ed find out that they are probably on the wrong track - Chet Butler, one of the gang's members, is missing and an emotional confession from Melway points to Butler as the murderer - not to stop the blackmail, but because Bradwood was engaged to Melway, with whom Butler used to have an affair and whom he still loves. Bradwood also found the love letters in which Butler claims to have killed Melway's husband.

Butler appears and implicates himself with words and actions. A chase ensues, ending with Nick being cornered finding the evidence that cements Butler's guilt. Nick is saved twice in quick succession, once by a schoolmate's opportune distraction, and once by an excellent shot of Ed's at the perfect time. Nick makes a date with Robin, who now knows he is an adult, and the real-estate scammers are arrested. Hector looks very foolish. Matt is released from jail and can't wait to get back to school.

== Cast ==
- Arliss Howard as Nick Dunbar
- Suzy Amis as Robin Torrence
- George Wendt as Chet Butler
- Diane Ladd as Jane Melway
- Seymour Cassel as Ed Malmburg
- Larry Pine as Dave Hechtor
- Jackie Gayle as Coach Zeffer
- Abe Vigoda as Mr. Wiseman
- Robert Stack as Mr. Gardner
- Alexandra Powers as Daun-Marie Zeffer
- Peter Dobson as Kyle Kerns
- Loren Dean as Matt Dunbar
- Harry Shearer as Simon
- Max Perlich as Carter
- Reginald VelJohnson as Graff

== Reception ==
=== Critical response ===
Plain Clothes was not widely distributed or reviewed, with critics responding negatively to the film. In her review for The New York Times, Janet Maslin wrote, "Plain Clothes tries to combine a police investigation story with the usual classroom and locker-room stuff. Less would not necessarily have been more, but it would have been shorter." In his review for the Miami Herald, Juan Carlos Coto wrote, "Potentially hilarious moments seem to straggle by like students playing hooky, and the whodunit plot gets dumber and more contrived at every turn."

== Box office ==
Released briefly, to only 193 theatres in the United States and Canada, Plain Clothes grossed $289,323 at the box office, against a budget of $7.5 million.
