= Serial Mom =

1994 film directed by John Waters

- Theatrical release poster
- Directed by: John Waters
- Written by: John Waters
- Produced by: John Fiedler; Mark Tarlov
- Starring: Kathleen Turner; Sam Waterston; Ricki Lake; Suzanne Somers
- Cinematography: Robert M. Stevens
- Edited by: Janice Hampton; Erica Huggins
- Music by: Basil Poledouris
- Production company: Polar Entertainment Corporation
- Distributed by: Savoy Pictures
- Release date: April 13, 1994
- Running time: 93 minutes
- Country: United States
- Language: English
- Budget: $13 million
- Box office: $7.8 million

Serial Mom is a 1994 American satirical black comedy crime film directed and written by John Waters and starring Kathleen Turner as the title character along with Sam Waterston, Ricki Lake, Matthew Lillard, and Suzanne Somers. It tells the story of a housewife who murders people over trivial slights or offenses.

Serial Mom was released theatrically in the United States on April 13, 1994, to mixed reviews from critics and grossed nearly $8 million. The film has since become a cult classic.

== Plot ==
Beverly Sutphin appears to be an unassuming upper-middle-class housewife living with her dentist husband Eugene and their teenage children, Misty and Chip, in Towson, Maryland. In truth, she is a serial killer who murders people over trivial slights or offenses.

One morning, detectives Pike and Gracey question the family about the vulgar telephone harassment of their neighbor, Dottie Hinkle. It is later revealed that Beverly is the perpetrator, and began harassing Dottie after she took a parking space from Beverly. Later that day, Beverly vengefully runs over Chip's math teacher, Mr. Stubbins, with her car after he condemns Chip's interest in horror films at a PTA meeting. Later, Misty is upset when her crush, Carl, stands her up for a date. Beverly spots Carl with another girl at a swap meet and fatally stabs him with a fire poker.

Eugene discovers serial killer memorabilia beneath his and Beverly's mattress, which includes recordings from Ted Bundy in the week of his execution. During dinner that evening, Chip mentions his friend Scotty's suspicions about Beverly being the killer. Beverly leaves, leaving the family afraid that she intends to kill Scotty in order to silence him. They race to Scotty's house; Beverly, however, intends to kill Ralph and Betty Sterner, a couple who had called Eugene to treat the former's toothache on a day Eugene and Beverly planned to spend birdwatching. She stabs Betty with scissors and pushes an air conditioner from the window onto Ralph. The rest of the family and the police arrive at Scotty's house, only to find him masturbating to a porn film.

Police follow the Sutphins to church on that Sunday as Beverly is named as the prime suspect in the Sterners' murders. The service abruptly ends when everyone flees in panic after Beverly sneezes; in the confusion, Beverly escapes as police attempt to arrest her. She hides at the video store where Chip is employed. Chip encounters regular customer Mrs. Jenson and fines her for neglecting to rewind her rented videotapes before returning them, whereupon she insults him. Beverly follows her home and fatally strikes her with a leg of lamb as she watches Annie. Scotty witnesses the attack nearby, but Beverly discovers him and gives chase, eventually concluding at a heavy metal bar. Beverly immolates Scotty during a rock concert. The Sutphins arrive as Beverly is arrested.

Beverly's trial becomes a media sensation. Beverly's lawyer claims that she is not guilty by reason of insanity, but is promptly dismissed when Beverly asks to defend herself. Beverly proves to be formidable when she systematically discredits every witness against her by exploiting their own vices or otherwise casting doubt on their testimony. Luann Hodges, the only witness who actually saw her commit a crime, is high on cannabis and thus unable to provide credible testimony. The courtroom is distracted by the arrival of Suzanne Somers, who has been cast as Beverly in a television film.

Beverly is acquitted of all charges. She expresses contempt for juror #8 for wearing white shoes after Labor Day. Beverly follows her to a payphone alcove and fatally strikes her with the receiver. Somers angers Beverly into an outburst while attempting to pose for a photo op. The juror's body is then discovered and Beverly gives Somers a knowing look.

A postscript states that Beverly Sutphin refused to cooperate with the making of this film.

== Cast ==
- Kathleen Turner as Beverly Sutphin
- Sam Waterston as Eugene Sutphin
- Ricki Lake as Misty Sutphin
- Matthew Lillard as Chip Sutphin
- Scott Wesley Morgan as Detective Pike
- Walt MacPherson as Detective Gracey
- Justin Whalin as Scotty Barnhill
- Patricia Dunnock as "Birdie"
- Lonnie Horsey as Carl Pageant
- Mink Stole as Dottie Hinkle
- Mary Jo Catlett as Rosemary Ackerman
- Kathy Fannon as Betty Sterner
- Doug Roberts as Ralph Sterner
- Traci Lords as Carl's date
- Tim Caggiano as Marvin Pickles
- Jeff Mandon as Howell Hawkins
- Patsy Grady Abrams as Mrs. Jenson
- Beau James as Timothy Nazlerod
- Kim Swann as Luann Hodges
- Anthony "Chip" Brienza as Swap meet vendor
- Suzanne Somers as herself
- Patty Hearst as juror #8
- Rosemary Knower and Susan Lowe as court groupies
- Mary Vivian Pearce as book buyer
- Brigid Berlin as a mean lady
- Joan Rivers as herself
- L7 as Camel Lips
- Bess Armstrong as Eugene's dental secretary (uncredited)
- John Waters as the voice of Ted Bundy (uncredited)

== Production ==
Actresses considered for the role of Beverly Sutphin before Turner was cast included Meryl Streep, Cathy Moriarty, Christine Baranski, Kathy Bates, Glenn Close, and Julie Andrews.

Films by Waters' creative influences, including Doris Wishman, Otto Preminger, William Castle, and Herschell Gordon Lewis, are seen playing on television sets throughout the film.

The audio for Ted Bundy in one of Beverly's correspondences with the jailed killer is the voice of Waters.

=== Post-production ===
The film had a troubled post-production, marked by conflict between Waters and Savoy Pictures. In his 2019 book Mr. Know-It-All, Waters states that studio executives who viewed an early cut objected to its violence and dark comedy. They demanded the film be substantially re-edited and given a different ending, which Waters refused to do. Acrimony between the two sides intensified following a poor test screening, which Waters believed was deliberately held before a conservative audience unlikely to enjoy the film. He contrasted it with a more receptive screening for members of the film industry in Los Angeles. Turner spoke about the ordeal to gossip columnist Liz Smith, who was a friend. Smith intervened with a column titled "Leave Serial Mom Alone", publicizing the situation, and Savoy eventually relented on its demands.

== Music ==
The film's score was composed by Basil Poledouris, performed by the Utah Symphony and recorded in Salt Lake City, Utah. The American rock band L7 appears in the film as the band Camel Lips, and performs the song "Gas Chamber", which was written by L7 with lyrical contributions by Waters. The film also features the song "Daybreak" by Barry Manilow. To discourage its use in this film, the copyright owners of the song "Tomorrow" from the 1982 film Annie, which is heard during a murder, quoted a high royalty fee of $60,000, but the studio paid the amount.

== Release ==
Serial Mom was screened out of competition as the closing night film at the 1994 Cannes Film Festival.

=== Home media ===
VHS 1995 Laserdisc Universal Studios and Focus Features released a collector's edition DVD of the film on May 6, 2008, replacing the original HBO Home Video DVD release, which is out of print. The DVD release features an audio commentary with Waters and Turner. The film was released as a Collector's Edition Blu-ray from Shout! Factory on May 9, 2017.

== Reception ==
=== Box office ===
The film opened on April 13, 1994, and grossed $2 million in its opening weekend, ranking number 11 at the US box office. By the end of its run, the film had grossed $7.8 million in the United States and Canada.

=== Critical response ===
On the review aggregator website Rotten Tomatoes, 63% of 56 critics' reviews are positive, with an average rating of 6.1/10. The website's consensus reads: "Kathleen Turner proves an ideal match for John Waters' suburban satire in Serial Mom, even if the somewhat scattershot end results often lack the expected bite." Metacritic, which uses a weighted average, assigned the film a score of 64 out of 100, based on 24 critics, indicating "generally favorable" reviews.

Roger Ebert awarded it two stars out of a possible four. While he found some of Waters' satire effective, he felt that Kathleen Turner's decision to portray her character's mental illness with realism as opposed to a campy fashion, while brave, made the character difficult to laugh at. He wrote, "Watch Serial Mom closely and you'll realize that something is miscalculated at a fundamental level. Turner's character is helpless and unwitting in a way that makes us feel almost sorry for her—and that undermines the humor. She isn't funny crazy, she's sick crazy."

Other critics were more enthusiastic about the film and Turner's performance. Time Out said the film boasts "an uproariously funny, marvellously malicious performance from Turner", and Peter Rainer of the Los Angeles Times called Turner "furiously funny". Rainer described the film as "a jab at the supposed uplift provided by 'wholesome' TV shows and movies. With all the ruckus raised in the media about the harmful effects of on-screen violence and sex, Serial Mom weighs in for the other side: It implies that it's the antiseptic family entertainments that may have done us the real harm. The real nut cases in the movie aren't the hormonally inflamed teenagers and avenging matriarchs. It's the suburban Baltimore do-gooders, the upright judges and deacons – you know, the pillars of society." Critics also lauded the satirization of America's obsession with true crime and celebrity, such as when Beverly's daughter, Misty, is seen selling T-shirts outside the courthouse where her mother's fate will be decided, and a joke disclaimer at the beginning falsely claiming the film's events are "based on a true story". In 2008, Slant Magazine critic Eric Henderson called Serial Mom "the strongest film of the post-midnight-movie chapter of John Waters's career."

Later reviews suggested that the trial in Serial Mom presaged the media coverage of the 1995 murder trial of O. J. Simpson.

=== Year-end lists ===
- Honorable mention – Dan Craft, The Pantagraph
- Guilty pleasure – Douglas Armstrong, The Milwaukee Journal
