= Pamela Payton-Wright =

American actress (1941–2019)

- Born: November 1, 1941; Pittsburgh, Pennsylvania, U.S.
- Died: December 14, 2019 (aged 78); Brookville, Pennsylvania, U.S.
- Years active: 1964–2012
- Spouse: David Arthur Butler (1978-1989; divorced)
- Children: Oliver Dickon Hedley Butler

Pamela Payton-Wright (November 1, 1941 – December 14, 2019) was an American actress.

== Life and work ==
One of four children born to Gordon Edgar Payton-Wright and his wife, Eleanor (née McKinley), she attended Tuscaloosa High School,

Payton-Wright graduated from Birmingham–Southern College in 1963, and from the Royal Academy of Dramatic Art, where she received the Special Medal and the Edmund Gray Prize for High Comedy.

Payton-Wright appeared in numerous Broadway and off-Broadway productions, notably receiving praise for her portrayal of Laura Wingfield in the 1976 production of The Glass Menagerie.

She began her film career in 1972 as Rhonda on Corky. Following numerous film roles and television appearances, Payton-Wright joined the cast of the ABC soap opera, One Life to Live, in 1991, and was the first to play the role of sweet natured, but simple-minded Agatha "Addie" Cramer. She played this part recurringly on the show. She later joined the cast of Another World in 1979 in the role of Hazel Parker, a role she played for one year.

== Death ==
Payton-Wright died on December 14, 2019 at the McKinley Health Center in Brookville, Pennsylvania, aged 78.

== Filmography ==
=== Film ===
Year	Title	Role	Notes
1972	Corky	Rhonda	
1979	Going in Style	Kathy	
1980	Resurrection	Margaret	
1981	The Dark End of the Street	Mary Ann	
1986	My Little Girl	Delly Bettinger	
1987	Ironweed	Mother	
1988	Starlight: A Musical Movie		
1990	The Freshman	Liz Armstrong	
1993	Me and Veronica	Agnes	
1999	In Dreams	Ethel	
2004	Saving Face	Dr. Morgan	

=== Television ===
Year	Title	Role	Notes
1969	NET Playhouse	Electra	"The Prodigal"
1971	Cannon	Ginger	"Fool's Gold"
1971	Mannix	Lisa Stabler	"Murder Times Three"
1971	Medical Center	Jessie	"Idolmaker"
1972	Medical Center	Lori	"Cycle of Peril"
1972	Young Dr. Kildare	Ruth	"Deaf Heart"
1972	Gunsmoke	Emma Donavan	"Yankton"
1972	Bonanza	Zeena Harris	"Search in Limbo"
1972	Look Homeward, Angel	Laura James	TV film
1973	ABC's Wide World of Entertainment	Rosalind	"The Haunting of Rosalind"
1974	Movin' On	Francie Simms	"Grit"
1975	Great Performances	Laetitia Lewis	"Brother to Dragons"
1976	The Adams Chronicles	Louisa Adams	TV miniseries
1979–80	Another World	Hazel Parker	TV series
1987	Spenser: For Hire	Karen Fuller	"I Confess"
1991–2012	One Life to Live	Addie Cramer	Recurring role
1993	Law & Order	Katherine McKinnon	"Pride and Joy"
1994–1997	Homicide: Life on the Street	Sister Magdalena Weber	"Nearer My God to Thee", "Fits Like a Glove", "Extreme Unction", "Kaddish"
1999	Law & Order	Vivian McBride	"Sideshow"

== Theater ==
=== Broadway ===
Year	Title	Role	Notes
1967–68	The Show Off	Amy	
1968	Exit the King	Juliette	
1968	The Cherry Orchard	Anya	
1968–69	Jimmy Shine	Constance Fry	
1972	The Crucible	Abigail Williams	
1972	Mourning Becomes Electra	Lavinia Mannon	
1974–75	All Over Town	Millie	
1975–76	The Glass Menagerie	The Daughter	
1977	Romeo and Juliet	Juliet	
1988	A Streetcar Named Desire	Blanche Du Bois	
1988	The Night of the Iguana	Miss Judith Fellowes	
1988–1990	M. Butterfly	Helga	
1995	Garden District	Grace	
2003	Long Day's Journey into Night	Mary Cavan Tyrone	

=== Off-Broadway ===
Year	Title	Role	Notes
1970	The Effect of Gamma Rays on Man-in-the-Moon Marigolds	Tillie	Mercer Arts Center
1975	Jesse and the Bandit Queen	Belle	Joseph Papp Public Theater/Susan Stein Shiva Theater
1980	The Seagull	Mash	Joseph Papp Public Theater/Newman Theater
1982	Don Juan	Dona Elvire	Delacorte Theater
1984	Young Playwrights Festival	Mary	Joseph Papp Public Theater/Martinson Theater
1998	Richard III	Margaret	Theater at St. Clement's Church
1998	Richard II	Margaret	Theater at St. Clement's Church
1998	Til the Rapture Comes Home	Althea Dale	Delacorte Theater
2000	What You Get and What You Expect	Louise Erkenter	New York Theatre Workshop
2003	Fifth of July	Sally Friedman	Peter Norton Space
2003	Duet	Eleonora Duse	Greenwich Street Theatre
2004	The Day Emily Married		59E59 Theater A
2006	Indian Blood	Eddie's Grandmother	59E59 Theater A
2008	Some Americans Abroad	Harriet Baldwin	Second Stage Theatre
2009	Vieux Carré	Carrie	Theater 80 St. Marks
2009	The Orphans' Home Cycle Part I	Mrs. Coons	Peter Norton Space
2009	The Orphans' Home Cycle Part II	Sarah Vaughn / Ruth Amos	Peter Norton Space
2010	The Orphans' Home Cycle Part III	Inez (Thornton) Kirby	Peter Norton Space
