= Walt MacPherson =

American film and television actor

- Occupations: Film and television actor
- Years active: 1987–2004

Walt MacPherson is an American film and television actor. He is perhaps best known for playing the recurring role of Roger Gaffney on 21 episodes of the American television drama series Homicide: Life on the Street.

== Partial filmography ==
=== Film ===
- Tin Men (1987) - Cadillac Salesman
- The Exorcist III (1989) - Police Sergeant
- In the Line of Fire (1993) - Hunter
- Serial Mom (1994) - Detective Gracey
- Shadow Conspiracy (1997) - Hickman
- Donnie Brasco (1997) - Sheriff
- The Jackal (1997) - Dennehey
- Montana (1998) - Mr. Presser
- Message in a Bottle (1999) - Pete The Cop
- Waking the Dead (2000) - Sarah's Father
- Dinner Rush (2000) - Detective Drury
- Super Troopers (2001) - Foreman One
- Thirteen Conversations About One Thing (2001) - Donald

=== Television ===
- Homicide: Life on the Street (1993–1998) - Roger Gaffney
- Law & Order (1997–2004) - Douglas Ashby / Murphy / Larry Stedler / Shelby
- 100 Centre Street (2001)
