= Michael Michele =

American actress (born 1966)

- Born: Michael Michele Williams; August 30, 1966 (age 60); Evansville, Indiana, U.S.
- Occupations: Actress; fashion designer
- Years active: 1986–present
- Children: 1

Michael Michele Williams (born August 30, 1966) is an American actress and fashion designer. She began her career on stage before appearing opposite Wesley Snipes in the 1991 film New Jack City.

In the 1990s, Michele had leading roles in two CBS television series: crime drama Dangerous Curves (1992–93) and prime time soap opera Central Park West. Michele also had a role as Sandra Gill, Malik Yoba's love interest, on the police drama New York Undercover. She later joined the cast of NBC police drama Homicide: Life on the Street (1998–99) playing Det. Rene Sheppard, and from 1999 to 2002 played Dr. Cleo Finch in the NBC medical drama ER. She also has appeared in the films The 6th Man (1997), The Substitute 2: School's Out (1998), Ali (2001), Dark Blue (2002) and How to Lose a Guy in 10 Days (2003). From 2017 to 2018, Michele starred as Ayanna Floyd in the Fox prime time soap opera Star, and in 2019 she joined The CW prime time soap opera Dynasty as Dominique Deveraux.

== Early life ==
Michael Michele Williams was born in Evansville, Indiana, the elder of two daughters. Her white father, Jerry, is a furniture-rental entrepreneur and her African American mother, Theresa, was employed by Bristol-Myers. She was named for her mother's best friend, Michael Ann. Michele attended Howard Roosa Elementary School (a K-8 school at the time) and Benjamin Bosse High School, where she was active on the basketball team.

== Career ==
Michele has appeared in music videos by R&B singers Freddie Jackson and Eric Gable. In 1989 she sued actor Eddie Murphy in a high-profile Hollywood lawsuit alleging she was fired from the movie Harlem Nights for rejecting his romantic advances. "She had the role that's now being played by Jasmine Guy, from A Different World," Murphy told Rolling Stone. "The fact of the matter is, I wanted someone with greater marquee value than Michael Michele. She wasn't working out. As for her claim that I was touching her, realistically speaking, if you're gonna be a sleaze and try to sleep with somebody, you try to sleep with 'em before you give 'em the part… In her lawsuit, she says I tried to touch her, like I was a pervert. I never tried to touch this woman. We had, like, four conversations, each time with up to sixty people around us on a sound stage. But the lawsuit itself didn't bother me. Lawsuits for me are an occupational hazard." Michele's suit was later settled out of court for an undisclosed sum.

In 1991, Michele had a starring role opposite Wesley Snipes in the 1991 film New Jack City directed by Mario Van Peebles. Despite the film's success, Michele did not have her next movie role until six years later, starring opposite Marlon Wayans in the comedy film The 6th Man. In 1992, she went on to star on the CBS late-night crime drama series Dangerous Curves, which ran for two seasons. In 1993, she played a leading role in the six-part NBC soap opera miniseries Trade Winds. The following year, she had a major recurring role in the Fox police drama series New York Undercover. She left the show in early 1995 to play one of the leads in the CBS prime time soap opera Central Park West alongside Mädchen Amick, Lauren Hutton and Raquel Welch. The series was not successful and was cancelled after two seasons in 1996.

In 1998, Michele joined the cast of NBC police drama Homicide: Life on the Street as Det. Rene Sheppard on the show's final season. She received her first NAACP Image Award for Outstanding Actress in a Drama Series nomination for this role. Michele reprised her role in a Law & Order episode in 1999 and in the television movie Homicide: The Movie in 2000. She later joined another NBC series, medical drama ER playing Dr. Cleo Finch from 1999 to 2002, for three seasons. She received another NAACP Image Award nomination.

In 2001, Michele played Veronica Porché Ali in the biographical drama film Ali opposite Will Smith. She later had two more movie roles: crime drama Dark Blue (2002) and romantic comedy How to Lose a Guy in 10 Days (2003). She returned to television in 2004, with a starring role in the short-lived UPN legal drama series Kevin Hill opposite Taye Diggs. In 2007, she guest starred on Law & Order: Special Victims Unit and in two episodes of House as a doctor in the CIA. In 2009, Michele starred in the Hallmark Channel film Relative Stranger with fellow ER cast member Eriq La Salle. In 2011, Michele had a recurring role on the CW teen drama Gossip Girl. In the late 2000s and early 2010s, Michele also starred in a number of unsold television pilots.

In 2017, Michele returned to series regular work playing villainous Ayanna Floyd, president of the record label, in the Fox prime time soap opera Star. Her character was described as a modern-day black Alexis Carrington. She also was cast in a recurring role in the Oprah Winfrey Network drama series Queen Sugar.

On March 22, 2019, it was announced that Michele had been cast as Dominique Deveraux for later in the second season of the Dynasty reboot series.

== Personal life ==
She has a son, born in 2004.

In 2005, TV Guide ranked Michele No. 36 on its "50 Sexiest Stars of All Time" list. In 2012, she was named one of the "50 Hottest Biracial Women" by Complex Magazine.

== Filmography ==
=== Film ===
Year	Title	Role
1990	Def by Temptation	Lady #6
1991	New Jack City	Selina
1997	The 6th Man	R.C. St. John
2001	Ali	Veronica Porché Ali
2002	Dark Blue	Beth Williamson
2003	How to Lose a Guy in 10 Days	Judy Spears

=== Television ===
Year	Title	Role	Notes
1988	1st & Ten	Gillian	Episode: "Saturday, Bloody Saturday"
1992–1993	Dangerous Curves	Holly Williams	Series regular
1993	Trade Winds	Maxine Phillips	TV miniseries
1994–1995	New York Undercover	Sandra Gill	Recurring role (12 episodes)
1995–1996	Central Park West	Nikki Sheridan	Series regular
1998	Players	Sylvie	Episode: "Con-tinental"
1998	The Substitute 2: School's Out	Kara Lavelle	Television film
1998	Creature	Tauna	TV miniseries
1998–1999	Homicide: Life on the Street	Detective Rene Sheppard	Series regular (season 7)
1999	Law & Order	Detective Rene Sheppard	Episode: "Sideshow"
2000	Homicide: The Movie	Detective Rene Sheppard	Television film
1999–2002	ER	Dr. Cleo Finch	Series regular (seasons 6–8)
2004–2005	Kevin Hill	Jessie Gray	Series regular
2005	The Hunt for the BTK Killer	Detective Baines	Television film
2006	Company Town	Bridget Wilson	Television short
2007	Law & Order: Special Victims Unit	Valerie Sennet	Episode: "Burned"
2007	House	Dr. Samira Terzi	Episodes: "Whatever It Takes" & "Ugly"
2009	Relative Stranger	Charlotte	Television film
2011	Gossip Girl	Jane Bettinger	Recurring role (4 episodes)
2014	Delirium	Elyse Hargrove	Television film
2015	The Following	Sheila	Episode: "A Hostile Witness"
2016	Blue Bloods	Lois Potter	Episode: "Unbearable Loss"
2016, 2018	MacGyver	Diane	Episodes: "Scissors" & "Murdoc + Handcuffs"
2017–2018	Star	Ayanna Floyd	Series regular (season 2)
2017–2018, 2021	Queen Sugar	Darlene Sutton	Recurring role (6 episodes)
2019–2022	Dynasty	Dominique Deveraux	Recurring role (season 2); series regular (seasons 3–5)
2023	Under His Influence	Casaundra	Television film
2023	Drunk, Driving, and 17	Martha Wright	Television film
2024–2025	The Equalizer	Evelyn Rogers	Recurring role (3 episodes)

=== Music videos ===
Year	Song	Artist
1986	"Have You Ever Loved Somebody"	Freddie Jackson
1987	"I Don't Want to Lose Your Love"	Freddie Jackson
1988	"Nice 'N' Slow"	Freddie Jackson
1989	"Remember (The First Time)"	Eric Gable
1991	"Can't Wait To Get You Home"	Eric Gable
1993	"Make Love Easy"	Freddie Jackson

== Awards and nominations ==
Year	Awards	Category	Recipient	Outcome
1999	NAACP Image Awards	NAACP Image Award for Outstanding Actress in a Drama Series	"Homicide: Life on the Street"	Nominated
2000	NAACP Image Awards	NAACP Image Award for Outstanding Supporting Actress in a Drama Series	"ER"	Nominated
2000	Screen Actors Guild Award	Screen Actors Guild Award for Outstanding Performance by an Ensemble in a Drama Series	"ER"	Nominated
2001	Screen Actors Guild Award	Screen Actors Guild Award for Outstanding Performance by an Ensemble in a Drama Series	"ER"	Nominated
2003	Black Reel Awards	Black Reel Award for Best Supporting Actress	"Dark Blue"	Nominated
2004	Teen Choice Awards	Teen Choice Award for Choice Movie Villain	"How to Lose a Guy in 10 Days"	Nominated
