= James C. Brincefield Jr. =

American lawyer and actor (1941–2021)

- Born: James Clifford Brincefield Jr. March 6, 1941; Washington, D.C., U.S.
- Died: July 23, 2021 (aged 80); Alexandria, Virginia, U.S.
- Occupation(s): Attorney, actor
- Years active: 1966–2020
- Spouse: Catherine Seay

James Clifford "Beau" Brincefield Jr., also known by his stage name, Beau James (March 6, 1941 – July 23, 2021) was an American lawyer and actor. His screen credits include Serial Mom and Head of State.

== Life ==
Beau Brincefield was born in Washington, D.C. to the former Rita Spiess and James C. Brincefield. His maternal grandfather was a Washington lawyer, and his father's family was in real estate. As a young man, he earned a real estate broker's license and went on to graduate from Georgetown University (B.A., 1963) and its Law School (J.D., 1966). He was awarded a dual master's degree (Master in Science in Real Estate and Master in Business Administration in Finance) from the American University Graduate School of Business in 1976.

Brincefield was admitted to the Bars of Virginia and the District of Columbia in 1966, and worked in private practice in Virginia and D.C. thereafter. He was elected to the Northern Virginia Association of Realtors' Hall of Fame in 2002. He was a co-founder of the law firm Brincefield Hartnett, P.C., and was a partner at Rich Rosenthal Brincefield Manitta Dzubin & Kroeger in Alexandria, Virginia. He was happy to lecture on real estate law, and served as a subject matter expert for Forbes magazine, The Wall Street Journal, The Washington Post, Washington Times, and other media. He also worked as a real estate developer in and around Alexandria.

Brincefield died on July 23, 2021, at the age of 80

== Acting career ==
Although law was his principal career, Brincefield enjoyed a second, part-time career as a professional actor (SAG-AFTRA, AEA), using the stage name Beau James, taken from the Bob Hope movie. He appeared in such movies as Serial Mom, Head of State, and Species II, as well as in a number of television programs, including the "Partners of the Heart" episode of American Experience, Homicide: Life on the Street, Law & Order, and America's Most Wanted, as well as many stage productions. He believed, however, that it is not good for a lawyer to be an actor, as "If a jury suspects that a lawyer is being anything but honest and candid, if the jury or judge even gets a whiff of you acting or pretending, you're a dead duck."

== Bibliography ==
- "The New Virginia Condominium Act," American Bar Association Committee on Housing and Urban Renewal, 1974 Annual Report
- "A Proposed D.C. Condominium Act," REALTOR, Volume XLIII, Number 8, August, 1975
- "Homeowner Associations: Transition from Developer Control," Virginia Lawyers Weekly, 7 VLW 884, January 25, 1993
- "Starting Strong: Evaluating and Asserting Homeowner Association Claims," Common Ground Magazine, January/February, 1994
- "Brincefield's Guide to Buying a Home: The Twenty One Biggest Mistakes People Make When They Buy a Home," United States Copyright Office Registration # TX 3-666-439, 1993
