= Isabella Hofmann =

American actress (born 1958)

- Born: December 11, 1958 (age 67); Chicago, Illinois, U.S.
- Occupation: Actress
- Years active: 1986–present
- Spouse: Steven Memel (m. 1988; div. 1994)
- Partner: Daniel Baldwin (1994–2005)
- Children: 1

Isabella Hofmann (born December 11, 1958) is an American actress known for her portrayal of Kate in Dear John (1988–1992), Megan Russert in Homicide: Life on the Street (1994–1997), and Dr. Renee Dunseith in Providence (2001–2002).

== Career ==
A native of Chicago, Hofmann attended East Troy High School in East Troy, Wisconsin, and Columbia College Chicago. She performed with the comedy troupe The Second City before breaking into television in 1986. Among her various television credits are Meredith Cavanaugh on JAG, Kate McCarron on the NBC sitcom Dear John, Lt. Megan Russert in the crime drama Homicide: Life on the Street, and Cecile Malone on the Showtime comedy Beggars and Choosers. She played Annie in the 1990 movie Tripwire and Marie in the 1994 movie Renaissance Man.

Hofmann appeared twice in season 7 of TV series Criminal Minds as David Rossi's first ex-wife Carolyn Baker. Hofmann appeared in a 2010 episode of NCIS (a spinoff of JAG) as the villainous Evelyn Wallace. In 2015, Hofmann landed a recurring role as Clarissa Stein, wife of Martin Stein (played by Victor Garber) in three episodes of The Flash, later reprising the role in two episodes of Legends of Tomorrow in 2016. She returned to the role in 2017 for the Arrowverse crossover event Crisis on Earth-X, appearing in part one (season 3, episode 8 of Supergirl) and part four (season 3, episode 8 of Legends).

== Personal life ==
Hofmann was in a relationship with actor Daniel Baldwin from 1994 until 2005. Together, they have one son, Atticus (b. 1996), who has autism.

== Filmography ==
Film

Year	Title	Role	Notes
1987	Real Men	Barbara Wilson	
1989	Tripwire	Annie	
1994	Renaissance Man	Marie	
1995	The Amazing Panda Adventure	Beth	
2004	The Princess Diaries 2: Royal Engagement	Miss Genovia Hildegard	
2006	Little Chenier	Gwenivere Labauve	
2010	Sex Tax: Based on a True Story	Janine Taylor	
2010	Burlesque	Loretta	
2013	Dreamer	Martha	
2014	West End	Mary Trevi	
2014	Sugar Daddies	Rita	
2021	Church People	Sue	
2021	Along Came Wanda	Grace	

Television

Year	Title	Role	Notes
1986	Head of the Class	Suzanne McGee	1 episode
1987	Matlock	Melinda Stuart	2 episodes
1987	Independence	Bridie	TV movie
1987	Night Court	Dr. Townsend	2 episodes
1988	Beauty and the Beast	Erika Salven	1 episode
1988	The Town Bully	Ronnie Doniger	TV movie
1991	L.A. Law	Karen Morrison	1 episode
1991	...And Then She Was Gone	Kate Lydon	TV movie
1991	Saturday's	Anne	TV movie
1988–1992	Dear John	Kate McCarron	Main role (90 episodes)
1993	The Boys	Molly Rich	Main role (6 episodes)
1993	Civil Wars	Cheryl Connolly	1 episode
1993	Sirens	Tatyana	2 episodes
1994	Sisters	Abby Malker	2 episodes
1994–1997	Homicide: Life on the Street	Megan Russert	Main role (3-4, Movie) Guest role (5)
1995	She Fought Alone	Avon Rose	TV movie
1996	Twisted Desire	Susan Stanton	TV movie
1996	ER	AIDS Clinic Doctor	1 episode
1997	Touched by an Angel	Sara Perkins	1 episode
1997	Dying to Belong	Gwen Connors	TV movie
1997	Unwed Father	Tess Crane	TV movie
1998	Atomic Dog	Janice Rifkin	TV movie
1998	The Advanced Guard	Harper	TV movie
1998–1999	Party of Five	Martha Levinson	3 episodes
1999	Sons of Thunder	Sarah McNulty	1 episode
1999	The Promise	Joanne Stoller	TV movie
1999–2000	Beggars and Choosers	Cecile Malone	Recurring role (18 episodes)
2000	Sole Survivor	Barbara Christman	TV movie
2001	The Practice	Kate Littlefield	2 episodes
2001	The Division		1 episode
2001	Touched by a Killer	Nikki Barrington	TV movie
2001–2002	Providence	Dr. Renee Dunseith	Recurring role (6 episodes)
2002	Firefly	Regan Tam	"Safe"
2002	NYPD Blue	Dr. Wachtel	1 episode
2002–2004	JAG	Meredith Cavanaugh	Recurring role (18 episodes)
2003	Cold Case	Charlotte Bayes	1 episode
2003	Karen Sisco	Elaine Mulraney	1 episode
2004	NTSB: The Crash of Flight 323	Anita	TV movie
2004	Helter Skelter	Rosemary LaBianca	TV movie
2005	Judging Amy	Katherine Dane	1 episode
2005	Strong Medicine	Maureen O'Connell	1 episode
2005	Crossing Jordan	Dr. Mara Pelone	1 episode
2005	Point Pleasant	Dr. Beverly Kendrick	1 episode
2006	The L Word	Marilyn	1 episode
2006	The Unit	Agent Terrell	1 episode
2006	Close to Home	Kimberly Nelson	1 episode
2007	Pandemic	Lauren Smith	
2007	Curb Your Enthusiasm	Barbara	1 episode
2008	Boston Legal	Carolyn Joseph	1 episode
2008	Dirty Sexy Money	Judge Fey Powell	1 episode
2008	My Own Worst Enemy	Mariam Shefer	1 episode
2008	Ghost Whisperer	Lynette Dennis	1 episode
2008	CSI: Miami	Dorothy Frost	1 episode
2009	Lie to Me	Judge Kathleen Stark	1 episode
2009	Midnight Bayou	Lillibeth Simone	TV movie
2009	Grey's Anatomy	Irene Waller	1 episode
2009	The Forgotten	Principal	1 episode
2010	NCIS	Judge Evelyn Wallace	1 episode
2011	The Protector	Barbara Campbell	1 episode
2011	Alphas	Jessica Elkhart	1 episode
2011	Second City This Week	Herself	Celebrity guest
2011	Criminal Minds	Carolyn Baker Rossi	2 episodes
2015	Crazy Ex-Girlfriend	Laura	1 episode
2015	Perception	Janice Bosworth	1 episode
2015	Gortimer Gibbon's Life on Normal Street	Ms. Williams	1 episode
2015	The Flash	Clarissa Stein	3 episodes
2016	NCIS: New Orleans	Nancy Nolan	1 episode
2016–17	Legends of Tomorrow	Clarissa Stein	3 episodes
2017	Supergirl	Clarissa Stein	"Crisis on Earth-X"
2017	A Neighbour's Deception	Cheryl Dixon	TV movie
2017	Michael Jackson: Searching for Neverland	Green	TV movie
2015–2018	Suits	Joan Walsh	2 episodes
2021	9-1-1	Dr. Copeland	Episode: "Alone Together"
2021	S.W.A.T.	Mrs. Evans	Episode: "Crusade"
2021	NCIS: Los Angeles	Miriam Sivac	Episode: "Sorry for Your Loss"

Video games

Year	Title	Role	Notes
2016	Dishonored 2	Lower Class Citizen	Voice
2017	Dishonored: Death of the Outsider	Lower Class Citizen	Voice
2025	Dune Awakening	Simone Von Konig, Juno Ezura	Voice
