= Callie Thorne =

American actress

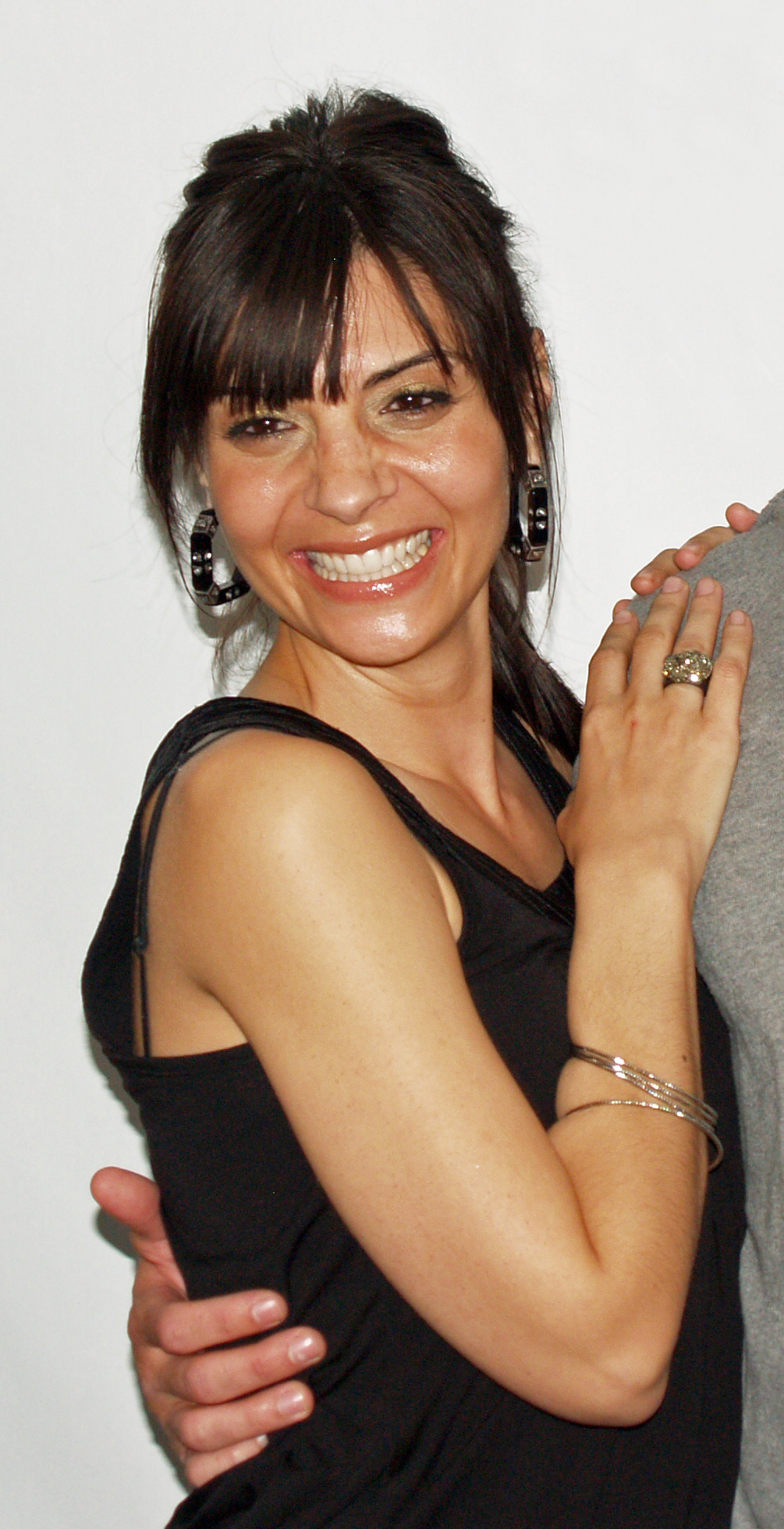
- Thorne at the premiere of Killer Movie at the Tribeca Film Festival in 2008.
- Born: Boston, Massachusetts, US
- Occupation: Actress
- Years active: 1996–present

Callie Thorne is an American actress known for her role as Dr. Dani Santino on the USA Network series Necessary Roughness. She is also known for past work such as her roles on Homicide: Life on the Street as Detective Laura Ballard, a role she held for two seasons, and the movie Homicide: The Movie, as well as for playing Sheila Keefe on Rescue Me and Elena McNulty in The Wire.

== Life and career ==
Thorne was born in Boston, Massachusetts and is of Armenian descent.

In addition to Rescue Me, Thorne has made guest appearances on television series such as ER (2005–2006); Law & Order: Criminal Intent, episode "Silver Lining", (2004); Law & Order: Special Victims Unit (2003–2019); The Wire (2002–2008); Prison Break (2006); Royal Pains (2009); White Collar (2009); Burn Notice (2009–2010); Californication (2011); and Elementary (2012) among others.

In 1996, Thorne co-starred in the romantic comedy Ed's Next Move. In 1997 and 1998, she appeared as Detective Laura Ballard on the television series Homicide: Life on the Street and its subsequent TV movie. She has also had many small roles in film and TV movies and starred in the 1998 film, Chocolate for Breakfast.

She was the lead in the USA Network series Necessary Roughness, which premiered on June 29, 2011. She received a Golden Globe nomination for Best Actress for her role. The series remained on the air for three seasons. In 2012, she won Outstanding Female Actor in a Leading Role in a Drama Series at the Gracie Allen Awards for her role.

Thorne has also done work on stage, such as in the off-Broadway play The Country Club (1999), with Cynthia Nixon. Additionally, she appeared with Eric Bogosian and Sam Rockwell in The Last Days of Judas Iscariot (2005), directed by Philip Seymour Hoffman. In 2015 she was set to portray Emme Haladjian in a TNT horror series entitled Breed.

Thorne portrayed Captain Nancy Santiani on the NBC police procedural drama The Mysteries of Laura. She left the show in 2016.

Recurring roles include her portrayals on NCIS: New Orleans as Sasha Broussard, a nemesis of lead character Dwayne Pride, and on Blue Bloods as Maggie Gibson, a psychic who aided character Danny Reagan on several of his cases.

== Filmography ==
=== Film ===
| Year | Title | Role | Notes |
|---|---|---|---|
| 1996 | Ed's Next Move | Lee | |
| 1997 | The Language of Love | Jill | Short film |
| 1997 | Turbulence | Laura | |
| 1998 | Next Stop Wonderland | Cricket | |
| 1998 | Chocolate for Breakfast | Nina | |
| 1999 | Giving It Up | Rex | |
| 2000 | Wirey Spindell | Tabitha | |
| 2000 | Double Parked | Rita Ronaldi | |
| 2000 | Whipped | Liz | |
| 2001 | Sidewalks of New York | Sue | |
| 2001 | Revolution #9 | Stephanie | |
| 2002 | Washington Heights | Raquel | |
| 2002 | Analyze That | Agent Cerrone | |
| 2002 | Stella Shorts: Yoga | Yoga Instructor | Short film |
| 2003 | This Is Not a Film | Callie | |
| 2005 | Strangers with Candy | Teacher | |
| 2005 | The F Word | Stephanie | |
| 2005 | Robin's Big Date | Kate | |
| 2005 | David & Layla | Abby | |
| 2006 | Jimmy Blue | Gina | Short film |
| 2006 | Delirious | Gabi | |
| 2007 | Watching the Detectives | Marcia | |
| 2009 | Around the Block | Paula | Short film |
| 2009 | Welcome to Academia | Valery | |
| 2010 | Meet My Boyfriend!!! | Lisa | Short film |
| 2010 | Nice Guy Johnny | Roseanne | |

=== TV ===
| Year | Title | Role | Notes |
|---|---|---|---|
| 1997–1999 | Homicide: Life on the Street | Laura Ballard | Main role; 44 episodes |
| 2000 | Strangers with Candy | School Nurse | Episode: "Bully" |
| 2000 | Ed | Judy Kellman | Episode: "Home Is Where the Ducks Are" |
| 2000 | Homicide: The Movie | Laura Ballard | TV film |
| 2001 | The $treet | Sabrina McKee | Episode: "Past Performance" |
| 2001 | More, Patience | Mia | TV film |
| 2002 | Third Watch | Jimmy's Friend | Episode: "Transformed" |
| 2002 | Hysterical Blindness | Carolann | TV film |
| 2002–2008 | The Wire | Elena McNulty | Recurring role; 12 episodes |
| 2003 | Titletown | | TV film |
| 2003–2021 | Law & Order: Special Victims Unit | Nikki Staines | Recurring role; 8 episodes |
| 2004–2011 | Rescue Me | Sheila Keefe | Main role; 93 episodes |
| 2004 | Law & Order: Criminal Intent | Sheila Bradley | Episode: "Silver Lining" |
| 2005–2006 | ER | Jodie Kenyon | Episodes: "Two Ships", "All About Christmas Eve", "If Not Now", "Quintessence of Dust" & "Darfur" |
| 2006 | Law & Order | Attorney Stuart | Episode: "Avatar" |
| 2006–2008 | Prison Break | Pam Mahone | Recurring role; 8 episodes |
| 2007 | Wainy Days | Mary | Episode: "Cyrano d'Bluetooth" |
| 2009 | White Collar | Maria Fiametta | Episode: "Book of Hours" |
| 2009 | Royal Pains | Allison Moore | Episode: "TB or Not TB" |
| 2009–2010 | Burn Notice | Natalie Rice | Episode: "Friends Like These" & "Hot Property" |
| 2011 | Californication | Sasha Bingham's Mom | Episode: "Lights, Camera, Asshole" |
| 2011–2013 | Necessary Roughness | Dr. Danielle "Dani" Santino | Main role |
| 2012 | Elementary | Terry D'Amico | Episode: "One Way to Get Off" |
| 2015–2021 | NCIS: New Orleans | Sasha Broussard | 9 episodes |
| 2015–2016 | The Americans | Tori | Episodes: "Dimebag", "Born Again" & "Glanders" |
| 2015–2016 | Sex & Drugs & Rock & Roll | Cat Zakarian | Episodes: "Tattoo You", "Rolling in the Deep" & "Bang Bang" |
| 2015–2016 | The Mysteries of Laura | Captain Nancy Santiani | Season 2 regular; 15 episodes |
| 2016 | Angel from Hell | Linda (Kelly's Mother) | Episode: "Soulmates" |
| 2017 | At Home with Amy Sedaris | Dr. Claire Shanks | Episode: "Gift Giving" |
| 2019–2022 | Blue Bloods | Maggie Gibson | Recurring |
| 2021 | Bull | Madeline McBride | Episode: "The Bad Client" |
| 2023 | Mayor of Kingstown | Allison | Episode: "Santa Jesus" |
