= Max Perlich =

American film and television actor

- Born: March 26, 1968 (age 58); Cleveland, Ohio, U.S.
- Occupation: Actor
- Years active: 1986–present
- Spouse: Jia Mae

Max Perlich (born March 26, 1968) is an American film and television actor. In 1990, Perlich won the Independent Spirit Award for Best Supporting Male for his performance in the hit indie film Drugstore Cowboy and was nominated for the same award in 1996 for his performance in Georgia.

== Early life ==
Perlich was born in Cleveland, Ohio. His mother was actress Linda Porter, known for her roles in shows such as Superstore and Gilmore Girls, and his father, Martin Perlich, was a writer, radio programming director and announcer, who worked for a time with the Cleveland Orchestra. The Perlich family moved to Los Angeles when Max was four.

== Career ==
After Perlich dropped out of high school in 10th grade, his career began with a small part in John Hughes' hit 1986 teen comedy Ferris Bueller's Day Off. He then began appearing in a series of bit parts on television and in teen films such as Can't Buy Me Love (1987), Plain Clothes (1988), Gleaming the Cube, Lost Angels and Drugstore Cowboy (1989). He also acted in the films Rush (1991), The Butcher's Wife (1991), Cliffhanger (1993), Maverick (1994), Shake, Rattle and Rock! (1994), Georgia (1995), Beautiful Girls (1996), Homeward Bound II: Lost in San Francisco (1996) House on Haunted Hill (1999), and Blow (2001). He had a recurring role as J. H. Brodie on Homicide: Life on the Street (1997). He also had recurring roles in the television series Buffy the Vampire Slayer (1998), Gilmore Girls (2001), Charmed (2005), My Name Is Earl (2006), and Terminator: The Sarah Connor Chronicles (2008), in addition to appearing in an episode of Season 4 of Burn Notice (2010). He is also featured in the music videos "Bust a Move" by Young MC, "No Excuses" by Alice in Chains and "Naked Eye" by Luscious Jackson.

== Filmography ==
=== Film ===
Year	Title	Role	Notes
1986	Ferris Bueller's Day Off	Anderson	
1987	The Allnighter	Benny	
1987	Can't Buy Me Love	Lester	
1987	In the Mood	Slapping Teenage Boy	
1987	Plain Clothes	Carter	
1988	Vibes	Busboy	
1989	Gleaming the Cube	Yabbo	
1989	Lost Angels	Frankie	
1989	Drugstore Cowboy	David	
1989	Gross Anatomy	Ethan Cleaver	
1990	Horseplayer	Kid	
1990	Genuine Risk	Chris Wood	
1991	Liebestraum	Orderly	
1991	The Butcher's Wife	Eugene	
1991	Rush	Walker	
1993	Born Yesterday	J.J.	
1993	Cliffhanger	Evan	
1994	Maverick	Johnny Hardin	
1994	Dead Beat	Jimmy	
1995	Terrified	Chad	
1995	Georgia	Axel Goldman	
1996	Cityscrapes: Los Angeles	Mack	
1996	Livers Ain't Cheap	Tom	
1996	The Grave	"Boo"	
1996	Beautiful Girls	Kevin "Kev"	
1996	Homeward Bound II: Lost in San Francisco	Ralph	
1996	Feeling Minnesota	Desk Clerk At Cowboy Style Hotel	
1997	Truth or Consequences, N.M.	Wayne	
1997	The Brave	Lou Jr.	
1997	Gummo	Cole	
1997	Men with Guns	Gary "Easy Gary"	
1997	The Curse of Inferno	Harold Cantrell	
1998	Goodbye Lover	Will	
1998	I Woke Up Early the Day I Died	Assistant Undertaker	
1998	Avenged	Horton	
1999	Freeway II: Confessions of a Trickbaby	"Flacco"	
1999	House on Haunted Hill	Schecter	
2000	The Independent	Ivan	
2000	Ropewalk	Dickie	
2000	Auggie Rose	Landlord	
2000	Stanley's Gig	Steve	
2000	Desperate but Not Serious	Todd	
2000	Beastie Boys Video Anthology	—N/a	Documentary shorts
2001	Blow	Kevin Dulli	
2001	Early Bird Special	Lester	
2002	Deuces Wild	Freddie	
2003	Sol Goode	Murphy	
2003	The Watermelon Heist	Deputy	
2003	The Missing	Isaac Edgerly	
2004	The Grey	Gus	
2004	Dinocroc	Deputy Kerrigan	
2005	The Nickel Children	The Bald Man	
2006	The Darwin Awards	Bob	
2006	Seven Mummies	Zeus	
2006	Punk Love	Officer Lawson	
2007	Protecting the King	Darryl	
2008	Ninja Cheerleaders	Jimmy "The Snitch"	
2011	InSight	Detective Canto	
2013	Night of the Templar	Benoit, The Butler	
2014	Bullet	Leroy	
2020	Tar	Alfred	

=== Television ===
Year	Title	Role	Notes
1987	Home Fires	Sam Ash	Television film
1987, 1989	My Two Dads	Delivery Guy / Pizza Delivery Boy	2 episodes
1988	21 Jump Street	Maxie "Mad Maxie"	Episode: "School's Out"
1988, 1989	TV 101	"Shadow"	2 episodes
1989	Trying Times	Older Benjie	Episode: "A Good Life"
1993	L.A. Law	Sandy Morrison	3 episodes
1994	Shake, Rattle and Rock!	Tony	Television film
1994	Rebel Highway	Tony Fazio / Aggie's Drummer	2 episodes
1995–1997	Homicide: Life on the Street	J. H. Brodie	36 episodes
1998	Buffy the Vampire Slayer	Whistler	Episode: "Becoming"
1998	Fantasy Island	Scotty	Episode: "Superfriends"
1998	Sometimes They Come Back... for More	Lieutenant Brian Shebanski	Television film
1999	Lansky	Meyer Lansky (Ages 19–28)	Television film
1999	Todd McFarlane's Spawn	Bobbie	Episode: "Seed of the Hellspawn"
1999	The Wild Thornberrys	Echidna	Episode: "Clash of the Teutons"
1999	Chicken Soup for the Soul	American Soldier	Episode: "Silent Night"
1999	Nash Bridges	Billy Hopkins	Episode: "Smash and Grab"
2000	Homicide: The Movie	J. H. Brodie	Television film
2001	NYPD Blue	Freddy	Episode: "Flight of Fancy"
2001	Thieves	Leo Kanowski	Episode: "Pilot"
2001	Gilmore Girls	Rune	3 episodes
2002	The Shield	"Ponyboy" Harris	Episode: "Pilot"
2002	Crossing Jordan	"Chill"	Episode: "With Honor"
2002	The Johnny Chronicles	Louis	Television film
2003	The Guardian	Mason Kazinski	Episode: "The Line"
2004	Line of Fire	Denny Markus	Episode: "Eminence Front: Part 1"
2005	Charmed	Laygan	3 episodes
2006	My Name Is Earl	Paul	2 episodes
2006	13 Graves	Russell	Television film
2008	Street Warrior	Georgie Bautista	Television film
2008, 2009	Terminator: The Sarah Connor Chronicles	Walsh	2 episodes
2010	Burn Notice	Hank	Episode: "Made Man"
2012	Hawaii Five-0	Sam Sherman	Episode: "Ha'alele"
2012–2014	Justified	Sammy Tonin	4 episodes
2017	Twin Peaks	Hank	Episode: "Part 1"
