= Toni Lewis =

American actress

- Born: Toni Lewis
- Occupation: Actress
- Spouse: Chris Tergesen

Toni Lewis is an American actress best known for playing Terri Stivers on Homicide: Life on the Street. The role led to her receiving a nomination for an NAACP Image Award for Outstanding Supporting Actress in a Drama Series. She is also known for playing Valerie Murphy on As the World Turns.

She is married to music editor Chris Tergesen, brother of Lee Tergesen, who played Officer Chris Thormann in seven episodes over three seasons of Homicide: Life on the Street.
