= Rene Sheppard =

Det. Rene Sheppard
- Det. Rene Sheppard
- First appearance: September 25, 1998 (7x01, "La Famiglia") (HLOTS)
- Last appearance: May 21, 1999 (7x22, Forgive Us Our Trespasses) (HLOTS); February 13, 2000; Homicide: The Movie
- Created by: Tom Fontana
- Portrayed by: Michael Michele

In-universe information
- Gender: Female
- Title: Detective
- Occupation: Homicide Detective; Fugitive Squad Detective (formerly)
- Significant other: Patrol Chief Jim Feliciano (fiancé)

Rene Sheppard is a fictional character in Homicide: Life on the Street, played by Michael Michele.

== In Homicide ==
Sheppard first appeared in Season 7. She was Miss Anne Arundel County (beauty pageant queen) sometime prior to joining the Baltimore Police Department. She came into the Homicide Section from the Escape and Apprehension Section (Fugitive Squad) and was partnered with Meldrick Lewis. A number of the male detectives are attracted to her, and she is asked out by Meldrick Lewis and Tim Bayliss – she turns them both down in a non-confrontational manner, developing a strong friendship with Bayliss and an initially strong working relationship (see below) with Lewis.

Her career is tested when an arrest goes bad; Sheppard is severely beaten by the suspect, who steals her gun and fires a shot at a shocked Lewis that almost kills him, causing the department to doubt her ability to do her job. Although he initially defends Sheppard's ability and gets her gun back to keep her career from being wrecked, Lewis' shock over his near death contributes to him making it clear he doesn't really trust her on the streets, leading to tension between the two and often resulting in their seeking other partners. After spending her recovery time behind a desk, Sheppard is allowed to be the primary detective on the "Internet Killer" case, and redeems herself somewhat by leading the investigation that led to the killer, Luke Ryland, being arrested. However, Sheppard later learns that Lewis was not the only cop in the Homicide unit who had concerns about her job performance: Terri Stivers outright says that Sheppard went for her gun too early during the confrontation, and tells Laura Ballard that while it's unfair for female cops to be judged harshly she feels that failures like Sheppard's give those critics more anger and confidence to be misogynistic. In the series' penultimate episode, Sheppard and Ballard work a case involving a murdered female gang member, and Sheppard feels pressured not to call in one of the male detectives to help them. When they close the case, Sheppard simply tells Lewis that she can do her job, no matter what anyone thinks.

In the series finale, Lewis makes a gratuitous reference to her losing her gun, and Sheppard just scoffs and walks away while Bayliss calls Lewis an ass and they have an argument over trusting their partners. Lewis partners with Falsone to solve the murder of a woman and is shocked when the woman's sister, a devout nun, offers solace and comfort to the killer when he's arrested by them. Pondering his own actions and attitude, Lewis asks Falsone about forgiveness and Falsone bluntly tells him "you should ask Sheppard." Lewis then asks Sheppard to join him on a homicide call, which they work without any problems.

== In Law & Order ==
Sheppard also appeared in the Law & Order episode "Sideshow" (Part 1).
