= Stuart Gharty =

- Stuart Gharty
- First appearance: April 12, 1996 (4x21, "Scene of the Crime") (Guest); October 17, 1997 (6x01, "Blood Ties (1)") (Regular)
- Last appearance: May 21, 1999 (7x22, "Forgive Us Our Trespasses") (HLOTS); February 13, 2000; Homicide: The Movie
- Created by: Tom Fontana
- Portrayed by: Peter Gerety

In-universe information
- Gender: Male
- Title: Lieutenant; Detective; Officer
- Occupation: Shift Commander of Homicide Unit; Homicide Detective (formerly); IID Detective (formerly); Patrolman (formerly)
- Family: Ellen (daughter), Sarah and Sandra (granddaughters), Joey (brother)
- Spouse: Flora (divorced)

Stuart Gharty is a fictional character played by Peter Gerety in the television series Homicide: Life on the Street.

He is introduced in the season four one-shot episode "Scene of the Crime", as a cowardly patrolman who allows two drug dealers to murder each other rather than venture into a housing project to prevent the crime. This exercise in poor judgment, compounded by his failure to call for back-up, and his attempt to later cover up these failings, leads to a hearing in which he is exonerated. At the end of the episode, Detective Megan Russert, the chief witness against Gharty, seems to be successful in her attempt to talk him into resigning and admitting to himself that he is not cut out for police work.

He is a Catholic. His father and grandfather were both butchers. When he was a teenager, he considered becoming a priest but changed his mind after meeting his wife. He had a brother named Joey.

At the time of his introduction, Gharty is 54 years old, with a wife, Flora; a daughter, Ellen; and two granddaughters, Sarah and Sandra. He tells Russert that he is six months away from being able to transfer into a desk job and get off patrol duty, and that concern for his family's welfare was the main reason that he did not go in after the shooters.

He later returns in the two-part season 5 finale, "Partners and Other Strangers" and "Strangers and Other Partners", in which it is revealed that not only did he not resign, he was promoted to Detective and given a senior position in the Internal Investigations Division — one of many unjust promotions featured in the show. He plays a key role in solving the murder of Detective Beau Felton, who, Gharty reveals, had been working for IID regarding possible corruption in the Auto Squad. Russert and Sergeant Kay Howard blame him for Felton's death for sending him undercover. When Lt. Giardello temporarily assigns him (and Auto Squad Det. Falsone) to the Homicide squad, Frank Pembleton originally does not want to work with him. Gharty later tells Pembleton that he suffered a brutal beating during an IID investigation and got over his fear of being hurt on the job. Afterwards, he works well with the homicide detectives and helps clear Felton's murder.

In season 6, Gharty is transferred to homicide as a result of a "departmental rotation" program recently implemented in the Baltimore Police Department. As a homicide detective partnered with Laura Ballard (to whom he is extremely loyal), Gharty sometimes displays racist paranoia, homophobia and other forms of pettiness, but for the most part redeems himself as a police officer, demonstrating aptitude, confidence, and devotion he had not exhibited as a patrolman. In the season 6 finale, he and Ballard are both wounded during a gunfight in the squad room; the shooter also kills three uniformed officers before being shot dead by several other detectives.

John Munch, despite describing Gharty as a "buddy" on at least one occasion, is openly disdainful of his presence in the unit, and begins in season 7 to openly question Gharty's statement that he served in Vietnam. Gharty and Munch also clash when both fall for bartender Billie Lou, as Gharty had begun an affair with her that led to his divorce but she ended up with (and briefly married) Munch. After Munch illegally obtains Gharty's service records and finds he received an "other than honorable" discharge, Gharty tells the whole story: he witnessed American troops committing atrocities against the residents of a village, and a superior officer ordered Gharty onto a waiting helicopter, only to then allow the unit to continue massacring the villagers. Gharty had briefly threatened his superior with a weapon during this confrontation, resulting in disciplinary action for insubordination and eventually his discharge.

Gharty gets a divorce from his wife early in Season 7, and begins drinking heavily later in that season before he is able to pull himself together.

== The Movie ==
In Homicide: The Movie, Gharty has been promoted to Lieutenant and succeeded Lt. Giardello as homicide shift commander, since Giardello is running for Mayor. Gharty admits that he was promoted and given Giardello's old position - which he is very aware he is unqualified for - because the bosses know they can push him around and that he was not going to last much longer on the streets. Gharty is forced to stand by and watch Captain Roger Gaffney dismiss retired detective Pembleton, who return to work with his partner Tim Bayliss with the hope of helping find Giardello's shooter. Pembleton tells Gharty he never had high regard for him but knows he is not this pathetic, not least in a situation involving someone who always backed and supported Gharty. Gharty respects Pembleton enough to be swayed by his investigative skills and ignores the bosses (on Pembleton's advice), giving him and Bayliss the chance to work Giardello's shooting, which they solve.
