= Laura Ballard =

Detective Laura Ballard
- Det. Laura Ballard
- First appearance: October 17, 1997 (6x01, "Blood Ties (part 1)")
- Last appearance: May 21, 1999 (7x22, "Forgive Us Our Trespasses" (HLOTS); February 13, 2000; Homicide: The Movie
- Created by: Tom Fontana
- Portrayed by: Callie Thorne

In-universe information
- Nickname: Seattle
- Gender: Female
- Title: Detective
- Occupation: Homicide Detective
- Significant other: Paul Falsone (Season 7)

Laura Ballard is a fictional character in Homicide: Life on the Street, played by Callie Thorne. She is a police detective in the homicide division of the Baltimore Police Department.

Ballard was born on November 20, 1968, and first appeared in Season 6 after changing police departments from Seattle. She arrives in Baltimore and quickly impresses Lieutenant Al Giardello, and after a rocky start wins over Detective Frank Pembleton as well. She is often partnered with Detective Stuart Gharty, with whom she generally gets along well.

Ballard has an adult-onset allergy to shellfish, but she does not discover this until she goes into anaphylactic shock following a crab dinner with Gharty and is rushed to the hospital in the episode "Saigon Rose". At the end of Season 6, Ballard and Gharty are both wounded during a shootout with Nathaniel Lee Mahoney, also known as "Junior Bunk", in the homicide unit's squadroom. Bunk kills three uniformed officers before several other detectives shoot him dead. Ballard suffers a serious injury to her foot, but fully recovers between Seasons 6 and 7 and begins dating Detective Paul Falsone early in Season 7.

In the episode "Bones of Contention", Falsone questions Ballard about her ethnic heritage prior to bringing her home to dinner with his Italian mother, shortly after the start of their relationship. She explains that Ballard is a Swedish name which belongs to her stepfather. She herself is Armenian, Assyrian, and, she says, "LBJ—little bit Jewish." In the same episode, Giardello warns Falsone about the regulations against intimate fraternization among members of the same shift, and Falsone and Ballard agree to stop seeing each other rather than risk discipline or a forced transfer out of Giardello's shift. However, this agreement merely leads to their continuing their relationship in secret.

In the episode "A Case of Do or Die", Ballard reveals to Falsone that she was once engaged but could not follow through with the wedding. In a scene at the Waterfront, Ballard says, "I walked out on him. It was two weeks before the wedding and I just took off. I didn't even tell him why."

Ballard becomes close friends with Detective Terri Stivers. The two of them worry about the perception of female cops, particularly after the beating of the unit's third female detective, Rene Sheppard. Although Ballard expresses her concerns to Sheppard gently, Sheppard gets angry at her. Still, the two detectives work smoothly together on a case involving girl gang members, and are pleased that they don't have to call on their male colleagues to come in and "save the day".
