= Megan Russert =

Lt./Capt./Det. Megan Russert
- Capt./Lt./Det. Megan Russert
- First appearance: October 14, 1994 (3x01, "Nearer My God to Thee")
- Last appearance: May 17, 1996 (4x22, Work Related) (Regular); May 16, 1997 (5x22, Strangers and Other Partners) (Guest); February 13, 2000; Homicide: The Movie
- Created by: Tom Fontana
- Portrayed by: Isabella Hofmann

In-universe information
- Gender: Female
- Title(s): Detective; Lieutenant; Captain
- Occupation: Homicide Detective (formerly); Shift Commander of Homicide Unit (Formerly); Captain of Homicide Unit (Formerly)
- Family: Eileen (Sister); Caroline (Daughter) Sasha Miceli; Tim Russert (Cousin)
- Spouses: Mike (First Husband, deceased); Unnamed French ambassador

Detective (formerly Lieutenant, Captain) Megan Russert is a fictional character on Homicide: Life on the Street played by Isabella Hofmann. At the time of her introduction in the premiere episode of the third season, she is a lieutenant who takes charge of the homicide unit's second shift after the previous commander's retirement. Later in the season, a vacancy opens up and she is promoted to captain on a trial basis, as a token of the city's commitment to diversity and equal opportunity.

Although she and Al Giardello get along reasonably well, he resents that she was promoted before him even though he had seniority over her. For her part she occasionally feels that he is diminishing or ignoring her authority. Her "softer" personality and ethical concerns about Frank Pembleton's interrogation methods also put her at odds with others. Her connections to national security officials, however, made her a valuable addition on certain cases.

She is a widow, with one daughter named Caroline (played by Sasha Miceli), who was born in 1988. Her husband was a tax attorney named Mike, introduced to her by her sister Eileen at a holiday party for the CPA firm where Eileen worked. Russert for the most part did not date during her two seasons on the series, though she is introduced to the series in the midst of an affair with Beau Felton (played by the then soon-to-be father of actress Hoffman's only child, Daniel Baldwin) – the affair ends soon after their first case is solved, but she supports him as a friend after the breakdown of his marriage.

She is a first cousin to the real life Tim Russert, who appears in the Season 3 episode "The Old and the Dead". In the Season 4 episode "Stakeout," she mentions her famous cousin to a one-shot character named Cathy Buxton (played by Kate Walsh), but the character is unimpressed as she watches a news show that competes with Russert's.

She graduated from the United States Naval Academy in 1983. During the 1980s, she worked in the Naval Intelligence Service and spent seven months and nine days at Guantanamo Bay, Cuba.

In Season 4, Felton is suspended, ending their connection. In the first half of the two-part episode "Sniper," she angers her boss, Colonel George Barnfather, due to problems at a press conference she held and the later suicide of the first sniper. Barnfather strips her of her probationary captain's rank and demotes her to detective, citing incompetence and insubordination. When the shootings begin again, she joins Giardello's shift and eventually gets the second sniper to confess. For the remainder of the season, she is partnered with John Munch.

Russert's apparent disappointments lead her to start a new life in Europe with a French diplomat at the start of Season 5. She appears during that season's finale, having returned briefly to Baltimore to help the squad investigate Felton's death. However, Giardello removes both her and Sergeant Kay Howard (Felton's former partner) from the case because they are both too emotionally involved and gives them the job of planning his memorial service instead. This marks the end of Russert's role in the series, but she returns in Homicide: The Movie, a post-series reunion released in 2000.
