= Terri Stivers =

Det. Terri Stivers
- Det. Terri Stivers
- First appearance: October 25, 1996 (5x04, Bad Medicine) (Recurring); September 25, 1998 (7x01, La Famiglia) (Regular)
- Last appearance: May 21, 1999 (7x22, Forgive Us Our Trespasses) (HLOTS); February 13, 2000; Homicide: The Movie
- Created by: Tom Fontana
- Portrayed by: Toni Lewis

In-universe information
- Gender: Female
- Title: Detective
- Occupation: Homicide Detective; Sex Crimes Detective (formerly); Narcotics Detective (formerly)

Terri Stivers is a fictional character in Homicide: Life on the Street. She was played by actress Toni Lewis.

Stivers first appears in Season 5 as a detective in the Baltimore Police Department's narcotics unit, frequently collaborating with the homicide detectives in an effort to bring down drug kingpin Luther Mahoney. After Mike Kellerman executes Mahoney in cold blood, the two of them and fellow detective Meldrick Lewis report the incident as a justified self-defense shooting. Stivers immediately expresses her unease about Kellerman's actions, while Lewis takes a more circuitous route in dealing with his own mixed emotions about the incident. In Season 6, she serves brief stints in the burglary and sex crime units before transferring to homicide.

The shooting touches off a war between the Mahoney organization and the police department, resulting in multiple casualties on both sides before a civil war leaves all of the Mahoney leadership either dead or imprisoned. After Stivers admits to Giardello that the reports on Mahoney's death were not accurate, the truth about the shooting comes out and Giardello brokers a deal for Kellerman to resign immediately so that Lewis and Stivers will not be fired for submitting false reports. Stivers remains in the homicide unit, but when she encounters Kellerman (now a private investigator) in Season 7, she criticizes him for the effect his actions have had on the department. She also expresses her dislike of new detective Rene Sheppard's inability to control the streets and forms a friendship with Laura Ballard, a more competent member of the unit who had previously served as a homicide detective in Seattle.

Her maternal grandmother was Trinidadian. She immigrated to the United States when she was a girl, went to college and became a teacher.
