= Roommates (2026 film) =

2026 film by Chandler Levack

- Release poster
- Directed by: Chandler Levack
- Written by: Jimmy Fowlie; Ceara Jane O'Sullivan
- Produced by: Adam Sandler; Tim Herlihy
- Starring: Sadie Sandler; Chloe East
- Cinematography: Maria Rusche
- Edited by: Tom Costain; Brian Robinson
- Music by: Ryan Holladay; Hays Holladay
- Production companies: Happy Madison Productions; Range Media Partners
- Distributed by: Netflix
- Release date: April 17, 2026
- Running time: 107 minutes
- Country: United States
- Language: English
- Budget: $30 million

Roommates is a 2026 American black comedy film directed by Chandler Levack and written by Jimmy Fowlie and Ceara O'Sullivan. The film stars Sadie Sandler and Chloe East.

The film tells the story of two college freshmen—one naive, the other cool and confident—who become roommates as they face different obstacles of living in the same dormitory. Their story is told by the Dean of Student Life, who knew them, to two present day roommates with similar issues.

Roommates was released on Netflix on April 17, 2026. It was met with mixed reviews.

== Plot ==
Luna and Auguste are Walton University dorm roommates. Starting as friends, their later disagreements escalate into a feud. They meet with Dean of Student Life Robyn Schilling. Hoping they work out their differences, she tells them a story from years earlier to prove things could always be worse.

As the introverted Devon Weisz failed to make friends in both high and middle school, she hopes to reinvent herself at Walton. At freshman orientation, she meets classmate Celeste and is awestruck by her friendliness and confidence. As orientation ends, Devon invites Celeste to be her roommate in the honor student dorm, and Celeste happily accepts.

Initially, everything goes well: they get along with minimal friction, and make plans to go to Panama City for spring break with their dormmates. Devon pays for this on her parents' emergency credit card. She also develops a crush on Michael at a house party, who turns out to be her TA.

During midterms, Devon helps the "sick" Celeste by writing her paper. However, returning to their room, she finds the healthy Celeste having sex with a boy, and that they inadvertently broke Devon's project. After Devon complains about Celeste to her parents, they convince Devon to invite Celeste home for Thanksgiving as she alludes to problems at home.

While home, Celeste ingratiates herself with Devon's family, including her younger brother Alex. Devon is tasked with watching the deep-fried turkey, but her grandmother Gigi sends her inside. Shortly afterwards, the turkey explodes; Celeste implies Devon is irresponsible.

Returning to campus, Celeste's passive-aggressive behavior continues, as she subtly exposes Devon's antidepressant prescription and steals her clothes. Devon meets with their RA—a younger Robyn—to request switching roommates. Celeste unwittingly sees an email from Robyn about this, and later reads a scathing poem about Devon's introversion and anxiety in their poetry class. Meanwhile, Devon continues to become more involved with Michael and is encouraged by her professor to present at WaltonCon, a school-wide competition to improve life on campus.

At a party, Devon and Michael kiss, but are interrupted when the visiting Alex becomes ill after consuming MDMA from Celeste, which she insists was Dramamine. At spring break, Celeste secretly signs Devon up for karaoke; though initially nervous, she comes out of her shell and is cheered on. Celeste vengefully makes out with Michael.

Devastated, Devon returns to Walton, where Alex comforts her. While using the fake ID Celeste procured her with Celeste's address, Devon discovers she is not poor as claimed: her father John is the CEO of Staples Inc., and she grew up in a mansion. She and Alex plot revenge through Devon's WaltonCon presentation, exposing Celeste's behavior and upbringing under the guise of improving dorm life.

Celeste moves out of their room, taking revenge by outing Alex to his high school with a fake promposal to his crush Peter. Finding Celeste in Robyn's room, Devon confronts her. They fight, with Celeste revealing she had been hooking up with Michael for months before spring break. In retaliation, Devon burns Celeste's possessions with Robyn's blowtorch, unintentionally burning down the entire dorm. Celeste admits she lied about her life to make herself more likable. Her home life is not ideal: her mother has Alzheimer's, and John divorced her to marry a much younger woman, Katie. Devon insists she still would have supported her if she had been honest.

Following the evacuation including the police, firefighters, and ambulances, John arrives with Katie and confronts Celeste in an ambulance, asking her where she wants to go to college next. She insists on going to rehab for PTSD which John assumes is a venereal disease.

Luna and Auguste reconcile as Robyn's story concludes. Robyn reveals what happened to everyone: Celeste was expelled twice more, financially cut off by John, and now works at a Staples; Michael's failed restaurant attempt was called Miguel's; Devon was sentenced to two months in prison for arson. She became best friends with her cellmate Louise with whom, after their release, she opened an architectural and design firm in New York City. Alex forgoes college and is engaged to Peter.

== Cast ==
- Sadie Sandler as Devon Weisz, a shy, introverted college freshman from Montclair, New Jersey
- Chloe East as Celeste Durand, Devon's more confident and self-assured roommate from Stamford, Connecticut
- Billy Bryk as Michael, a senior architecture student and Devon's love interest
- Sarah Sherman as Dr. Robyn Schilling, Walton College's Dean of Student Life and the former RA of Devon and Celeste's dorm who recaps the story of how she knew Devon and Celeste
- Martin Herlihy as George, a student and the president of Walton's frisbee club
- Josh Segarra as Goose
- Carol Kane as Gigi, Hannah's mother and Devon and Alex's grandmother
- Natasha Lyonne as Hannah Weisz, a fast-talking ceramicist who is Devon and Alex's mother and Brian's wife
- Nick Kroll as Brian Weisz, Devon and Alex's supportive father and Hannah's husband
- Janeane Garofalo as Professor Ziemann, Devon's architecture professor
- Aidan Langford as Alex Weisz, Devon's younger brother
- Bella Murphy as Amber, a college freshman who lives down the hall from Devon and Celeste
- Jaya Harper as Olivia, Amber's roommate
- Storm Reid as Luna, a freshman student in conflict with her roommate
- Ivy Wolk as Auguste, Luna's roommate who was in conflict with Luna
- Bailee Madison as Rebecca Anderson, Devon's high school valedictorian who ends up getting pregnant in the months following graduation.
- Megan Thee Stallion as Louise "Chuck", a prisoner who committed a robbery in Montclair, New Jersey, and Devon's previous cellmate who later helps her to open an architecture and design firm after they each served their time and her new best friend.
- Steve Buscemi as John, Celeste's father who is the CEO of Staples Inc.
- Francesca Scorsese as Ellie, an orientation leader
- Chloe Cherry as Katie, Celeste's stepmother

== Production ==
The film was announced to be in production in July 2025. It was also confirmed that Sarah Sherman, Natasha Lyonne, Nick Kroll, Sadie Sandler, Chloe East, and Storm Reid were part of the cast.

Principal photography began in June 2025 coinciding with another Happy Madison–production Don't Say Good Luck in New Jersey. Ryan and Hays Holladay composed the score for the film.

Levack has said she was approached by Sandler to direct the film - him having been a fan of her directorial debut I Like Movies, - and she ultimately secured the job and was given the largest budget of her career with $30 million.

== Music ==
- "300 Dreams" by After
- "Glide" by NEIKED and Portugal. The Man
- "Write a List of Things To Look Forward To" by Courtney Barnett
- "Archie, Marry Me" by Alvvays
- "Ralph Lauren" by Frost Children and Babymorocco
- "Slide Tackle" by Japanese Breakfast
- "It’s Ya Birthday Night, No Rules" by Dwight "Father Times" Benjamin
- "In The Bag" by Jade Josephine
- "International Players Anthem (I Choose You)" by UGK Feat. Outkast
- "The Spins" by Mac Miller and Empire of the Sun
- "Summer of My Life" by Claud
- "Mrs Magic" by Strawberry Guy
- "Legs" by Boyish
- "Sword" by Ian Sweet
- "Two Princes" by Spin Doctors
- "When It's Us" by Tiffany Topol
- "Big Fat Mouth" by Arlie
- "Marcel" by Her's
- "Mr. Brightside" by The Killers
- "Stress Relief" by Late Night Drive Home
- "Ride the Horse" by Vanilla Ice, Forgiato Blow and Cowboy Troy
- "Pretty Fly (For a White Guy)" by The Offspring
- "Anyway" by Ekat19
- "Supersad" by Suki Waterhouse
- "Right Now" by Mindflip
- "Starburst" by Danny Brown
- "Teen Angst" by Inji
- "Driver's License" by Olivia Rodrigo
- "Mind Loaded" by Blood Orange Feat. Caroline Polachek, Lorde and Mustafa
- "Slow Dances" by Winnetka Bowling League
- " Heads Will Roll (A-Trak Remix)" by Yeah Yeah Yeahs and A-Trak
- "Also Sprach Zarathustra, Op. 30" by Richard Strauss
- "Jaime" by King Princess
- "Change" by Alex G
- "Girl, So Confusing" by Charli XCX
- "Walk with Me" by Sadie Sandler

== Marketing ==
On April 17, 2026, at Coachella 2026, the skywriting message "Celeste is a liar" was produced over the venue. While The Desert Sun suggested the stunt was marketing for the film and referred to East's character, the message drew controversy as the musician D4vd had been arrested for the killing of Celeste Rivas Hernandez, a 14-year-old girl, the day prior. Netflix did not respond to initial inquiries of whether they were responsible for the message.

== Release ==
Roommates was released on Netflix on April 17, 2026.

== Reception ==
On the review aggregator website Rotten Tomatoes, 65% of 26 critics' reviews are positive, with an average rating of 5.8/10. The website's consensus reads: "A messy but affecting college comedy, Roommates swaps big laughs for emotional sincerity, elevated by strong performances even as its uncertain tone keeps it from fully coming together." Metacritic, which uses a weighted average, assigned the film a score of 57 out of 100, based on 5 critics, indicating "mixed or average" reviews.
