= Isaiah Lehtinen =

Canadian actor

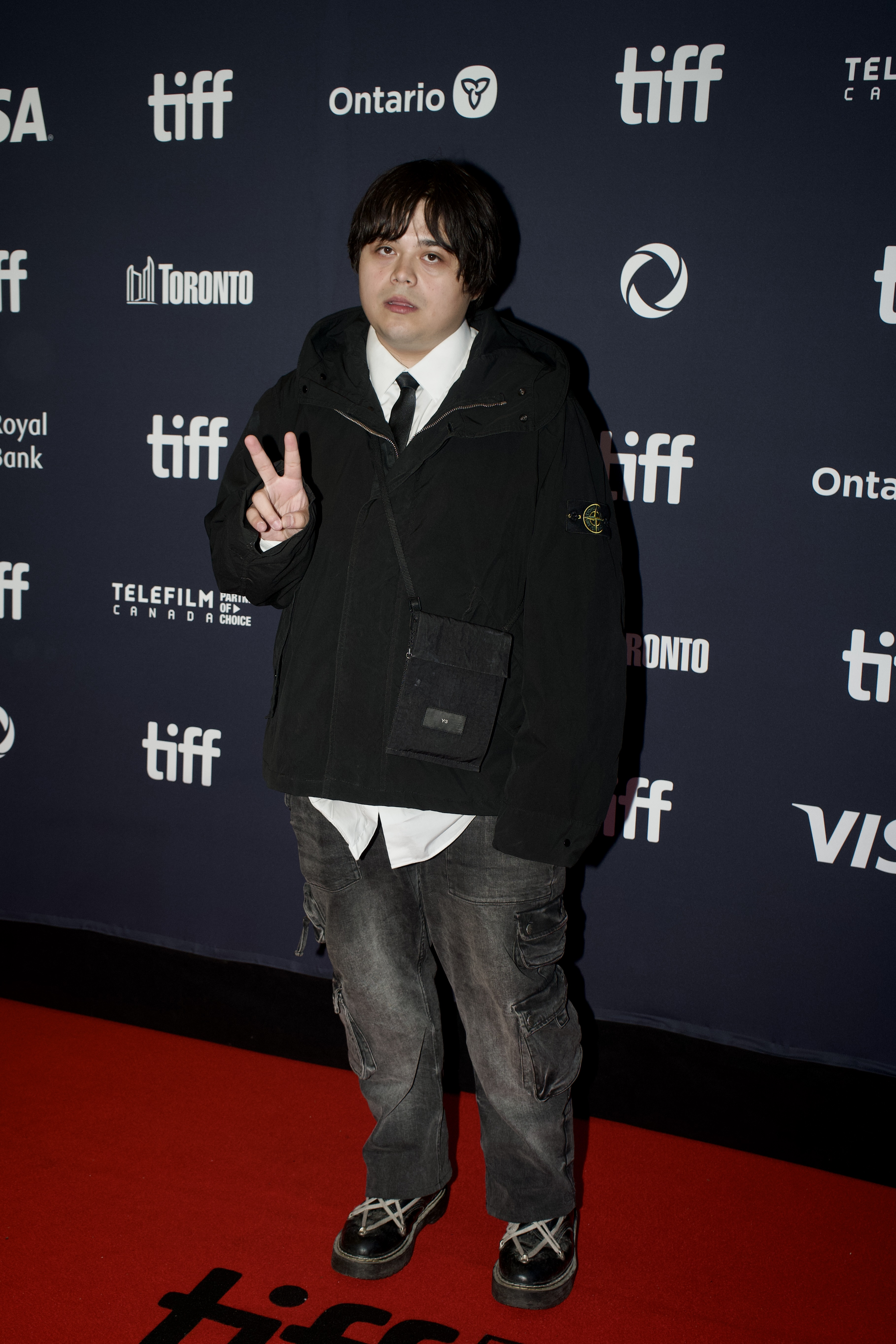
- Lehtinen in September 2022.
- Born: 26 January 1998 (age 28); Nanaimo, British Columbia, Canada
- Other name: Hermit
- Occupations: Actor; rapper; record producer; singer; songwriter
- Years active: 2011–present
- Musical career
- Origin: Vancouver, British Columbia, Canada
- Genres: Hip hop

Isaiah Lehtinen (born 26 January 1998) is a Canadian actor and musician. He attracted critical acclaim for his performance in Chandler Levack's 2022 film I Like Movies, for which he won the Vancouver Film Critics Circle award for Best Actor in a Canadian Film at the Vancouver Film Critics Circle Awards 2022.

Since 2015, Lehtinen has released hip hop music under the alias Hermit. He released a full-length album, Service For Shut-Ins, in 2024. He has also had supporting or guest roles in the films Freaky Friday and Phil, and the television series Level Up, Deadly Class, Family Law and Pretty Hard Cases.

== Filmography ==
=== Film ===
Year	Title	Role	Notes	Ref.
2017	Story of a Girl	Brandon	TV Movie	
2018	Freaky Friday	Karl Carlson	TV Movie	
2019	Mystery 101: Dead Talk	Owen Shea	TV Movie	
2019	Phil	Teen #1		
2021	River Boy Blues	Ruben	Short	
2022	I Like Movies	Lawrence Kweller		
2024	The Death of James	Ellery	Animated short	
2024	Good Cheap Fast			
2025	Mile End Kicks	Jesse		

=== Television ===
Year	Project	Role	Notes	Ref.
2011-2013	Health Nutz	Elijah	6 episodes	
2012	Once Upon a Time	Gordie	1 episode	
2012-2013	Level Up	Joaquin Prietto	5 episodes	
2015	If There Be Thorns	Big Ears	TV movie	
2016	The Flash	Kid	1 episode	
2018	The Good Doctor	Marc	1 episode	
2019	Deadly Class	Shabnam	6 episodes	
2020	When the Streetlights Go On	Jamie	4 episodes	
2021	Family Law	Aaron Kirkman		
2023	Pretty Hard Cases	Ray	1 episode	
2024	Hudson & Rex	Elijah Arneaux	1 episode	
