= YMCA Camp Hi-Rock =

Coordinates: 42.079639°N 73.465565°W

Camp Hi-Rock is a YMCA summer camp for boys and girls in the Berkshires region of western Massachusetts. They were founded in 1948 around Plantain Pond on Mt. Washington.

== History ==
The camp was founded in 1948.

== Structure ==
=== Campers ===
The residential campers are divided into six groups or "units" by age and gender. They live separately and eat together. They participate in daily activities together. Units are divided by cabins, each housing on average around ten campers and two or more staff members. The names of the units were changed in 2021.

- Woodlands: Girls+ age 7-9
- Coyote (Originally Abnaki): Boys+ age 7-9
- Wildcats (Originally Wigwam) : Girls+ age 10-12
- Bullfrogs (Originally Frontier): Boys+ age 10-12
- Blue Heron (Originally Algonquin): Girls+ age 13-15
- Red Hawk (Originally Mohawk): Boys+ age 13-15

== Notable alumni ==
- Lady Gaga (1999-2001)
- Chris Licht (1981-1986)
- Pico Alexander (2012-2014)
