= Young Mazino =

American actor

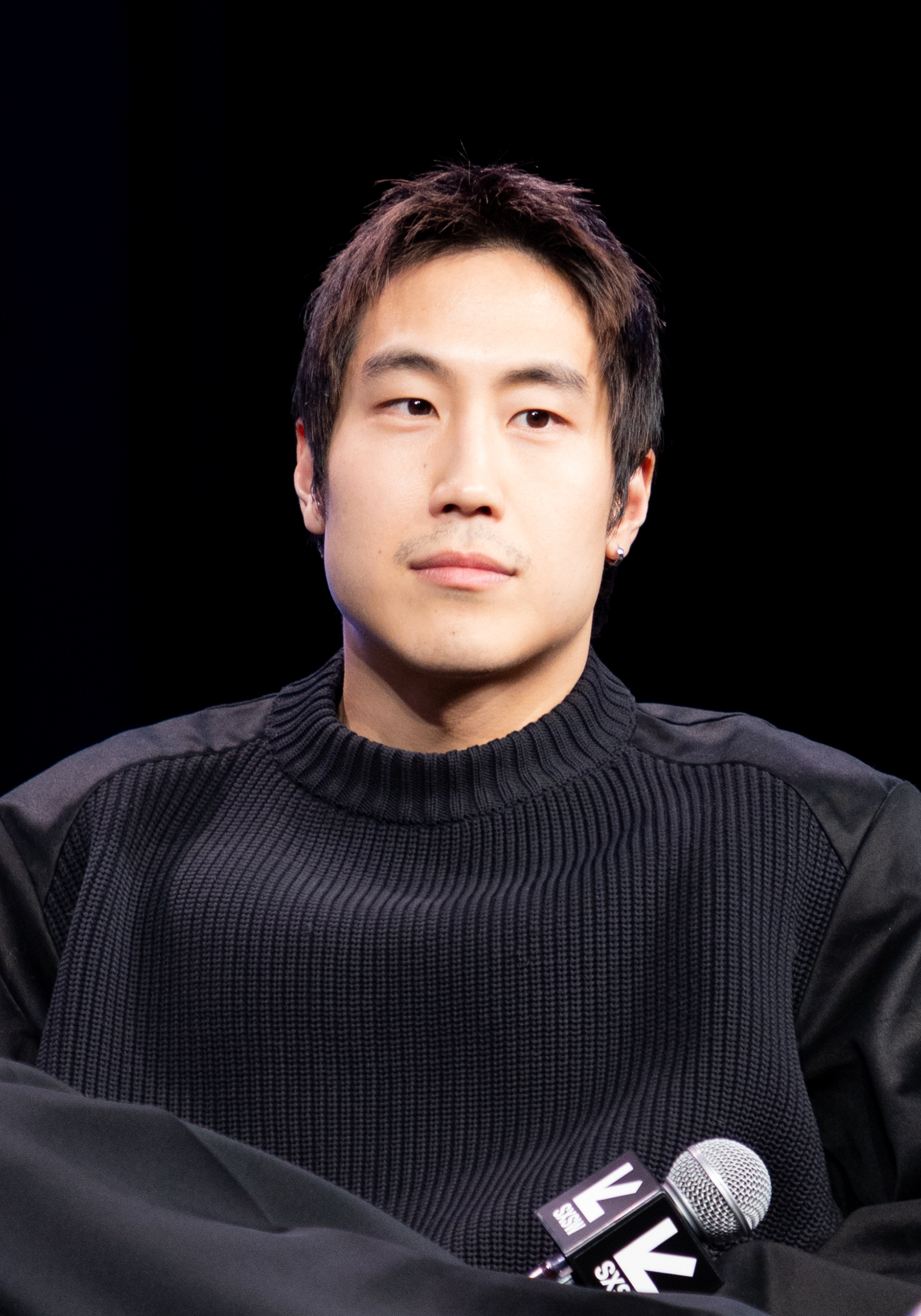
- Mazino in 2025
- Born: Christopher Young Kim; Montgomery County, Maryland, U.S.
- Education: University of Maryland, Baltimore County (dropped out); Stella Adler Studio of Acting
- Occupation: Actor
- Years active: 2012–present

Christopher Young Kim, known professionally as Young Mazino, is an American actor. He had his breakout role in the Netflix series Beef (2023), for which he was nominated for a Primetime Emmy Award. He stars in the HBO drama series The Last of Us as Jesse and in the first-person shooter game Call of Duty: Modern Warfare 4 as Private Park Hyun Jun.

== Early life ==
Christopher Young Kim was born in Maryland. He grew up in Silver Spring, Maryland, raised by Korean immigrant parents. He has two older sisters. His father immigrated to the United States from Korea at the age of 16. Mazino has a first-degree black belt in taekwondo.

He attended the University of Maryland, Baltimore County. He dropped out and moved to New York City in 2014 to attend the Stella Adler Studio of Acting, where he trained for a year.

Prior to his breakout role in Beef, Mazino was senior business intelligence analyst at LVMH's Fresh for six years.

== Career ==
Mazino chose the moniker "Young Mazino" as his stage name in 2018. The name is a combination of Mazino's Korean middle name and the name of a comic book character, Urek Mazino from Tower of God created by Korean manhwa artist S.I.U. Mazino explained that he decided to take a stage name because there were too many actors with his real surname when he was registering with the Screen Actors Guild in 2018.

He played roles in several short films and television shows before being cast in a break out role as Steven Yeun's younger brother, Paul, in the Netflix series Beef, for which he was nominated for the Primetime Emmy Award for Outstanding Supporting Actor in a Limited or Anthology Series or Movie.

In January 2024, it was announced that Mazino would join the cast of season 2 of the HBO series The Last of Us as Jesse.

== Filmography ==
=== Film ===
Year	Title	Role	Notes/Ref.
2013	Digging	Young Man	Short; credited as Christopher Kim
2015	Beneath Paradise	Khal	Credited as Christopher Kim
2016	The Destined King	Sanggun	Short; credited as Christopher Kim
2017	Foundation	Matt	Short; credited as Christopher Kim
2018	Fish Bones	Peter Kim	Credited as Christopher Kim
2022	Good Boy	Joon Kim	Short
2023	Trinity's Triumph	Father Kim	
2025	Opus	Kent	
2026	Via Negativa	Dan	
2026	How to Rob a Bank	Marquis Collins	
2026	Steps	Gef (voice)	
2027	Slayground		Post-production

=== Television ===
Year	Title	Role	Notes
2014	My Crazy Love	Jamie	Episode: "Beth and Noah"; Credited as Christopher Kim
2016	Blindspot	Armored Guard #2	Episode: "Any Wounded Thief"; Credited as Christopher Kim
2018	New Amsterdam	Bilingual Intern #4	Episode: "Pilot"
2019	Blue Bloods	Officer Andy Chen	Episode: "Behind the Smile"
2020	Tommy	Jun	Episode: "The Ninth Girl"
2020	Prodigal Son	Alex Wu	Episode: "The Job"
2023	Beef	Paul Cho	Main role; 10 episodes
2025–present	The Last of Us	Jesse	Main role (seasons 2–3); 6 episodes
2026	Star Wars: Visions Presents – The Ninth Jedi	Nawaam (voice)	4 episodes; English dub

=== Video games ===
Year	Title	Role	Notes
2026	Call of Duty: Modern Warfare 4	Private Park Hyun Jun	Voice and motion capture

=== Music video appearances ===
Year	Title	Role	Artist
2023	"Snooze"	Love interest	SZA
