= Chandler Levack =

Canadian journalist and filmmaker

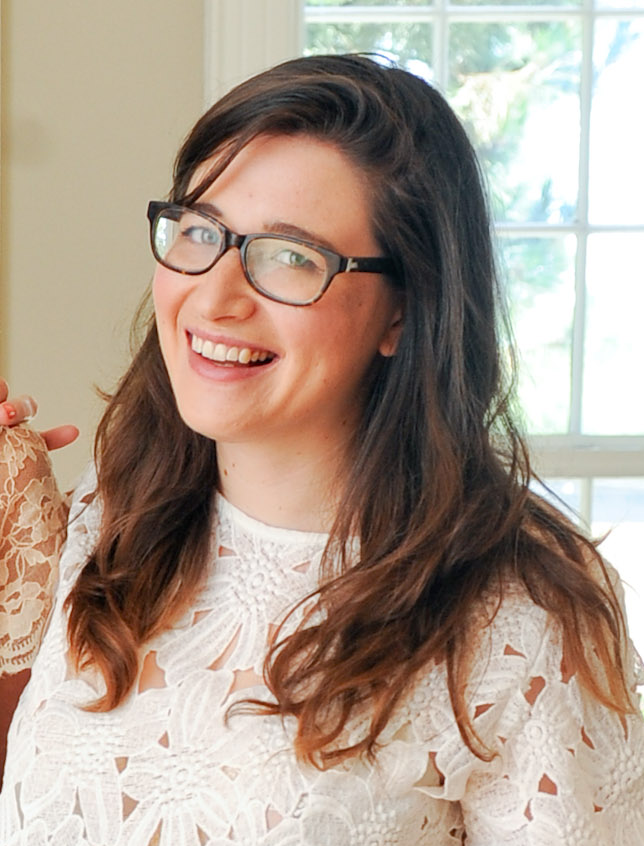
- Levack in 2014
- Born: 1986 or 1987 (age 39–40)
- Education: University of Toronto (dropped out); Canadian Film Centre
- Occupations: Writer, director, filmmaker
- Years active: 2010s–present
- Notable work: I Like Movies

Chandler Levack (born 1986 or 1987) is a Canadian writer, director, and filmmaker.

Levack is best known for her work as an entertainment writer, and for her feature film directorial debut, I Like Movies, which premiered in the Discovery program at the 2022 Toronto International Film Festival to critical acclaim. She has also directed the feature films Mile End Kicks (2025) and Roommates (2026).

== Early life ==
Levack was born in Toronto and raised in Brantford, Ontario. In 2004, Levack returned to live in Toronto's Parkdale neighbourhood.

== Career ==
Levack dropped out of her cinema studies courses at the University of Toronto to pursue a career as a writer. Since then, she has worked as an arts and entertainment writer for publications including Toronto Life, SPIN, The Globe and Mail, and the Toronto Star.

Levack is a two-time Juno Award nominee for Video of the Year, receiving nominations alongside Jeremy Schaulin-Rioux at the Juno Awards of 2015 for directing PUP's "Guilt Trip" music video, and at the Juno Awards of 2016 for directing PUP's "Dark Days" music video.

She was a Prism Prize nominee for both "Guilt Trip" and "Dark Days", and has also directed music videos for DZ Deathrays and Jeremy Dutcher.

Matthew Miller's production company Zapruder Films (which he co-founded with Matt Johnson), launched a contest in 2016 to back a first-time female screenwriter with $12,000 in funding, story editor guidance, and script optioning; Levack and her feature film Anglophone were announced as the winner from 137 entries.

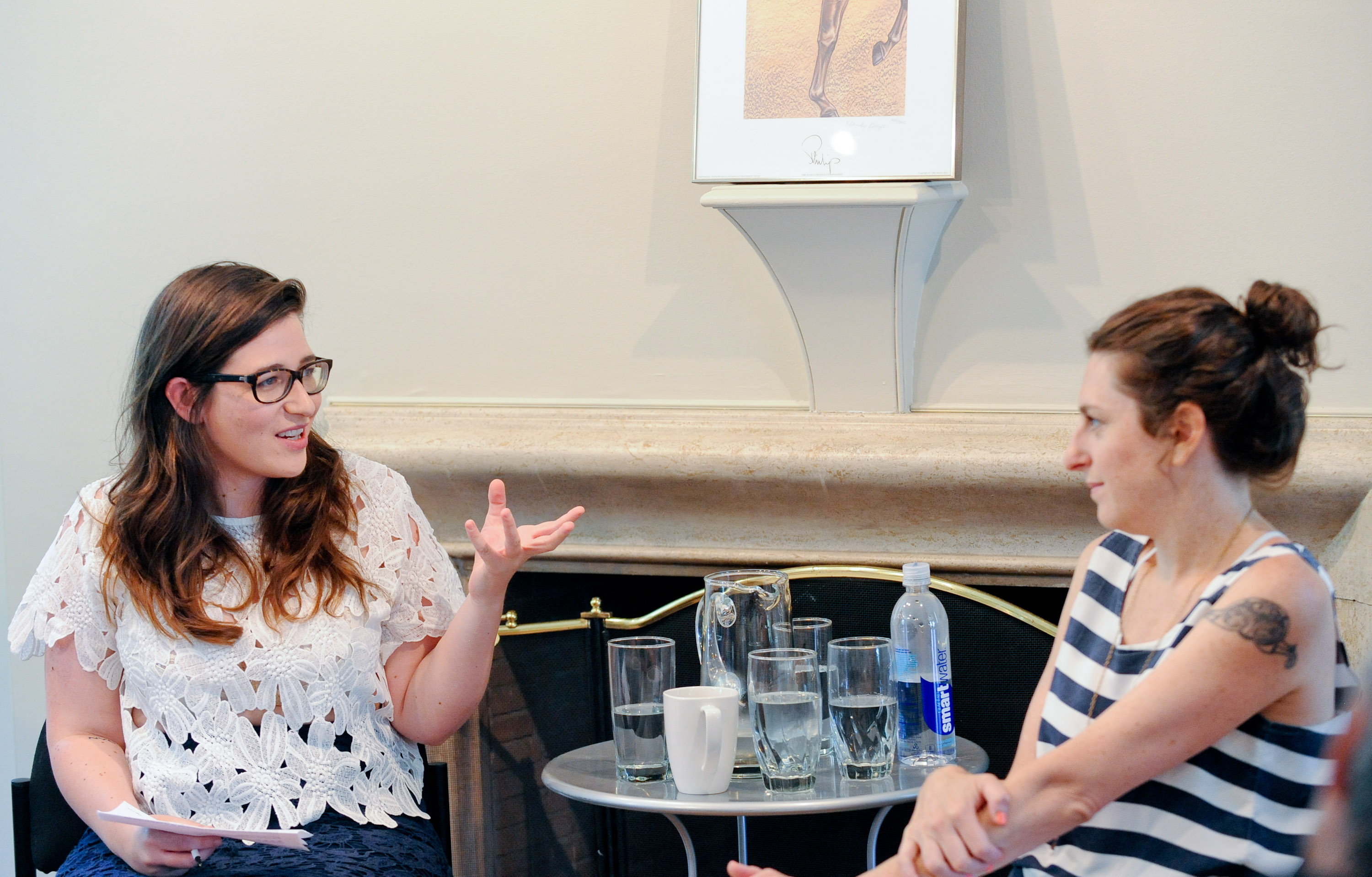
Levack moderating a talk with Gillian Robespierre in 2014

Her debut as a narrative filmmaker, the short film We Forgot to Break Up, premiered at the 2017 Toronto International Film Festival, and won the award for Best Canadian Short Film at the 2017 Whistler Film Festival.

Levak later studied screenwriting at the Canadian Film Centre.

I Like Movies, Levack's debut feature film, premiered in the Discovery program at the 2022 Toronto International Film Festival, and received widespread acclaim. On the review aggregator website Rotten Tomatoes, the film holds an approval rating of 100% based on 35 reviews, with an average rating of 8/10. The film was named to TIFF's annual year-end Canada's Top Ten list for 2022. Levack won the $10,000 RBC Emerging Artist Award at the 2022 Calgary International Film Festival for the film. In 2023, Barry Hertz of The Globe and Mail named the film as one of the 23 best Canadian comedy films ever made.

In November 2023, she was announced as the director of My Dead Mom, a short-form comedy series which premiered in 2024 on Crave.

In 2024, it was announced that Levack's second feature, Mile End Kicks (retitled from Anglophone), would star Barbie Ferreira, Devon Bostick, Stanley Simons, and Juliette Gariépy. The film is based on Levack's experiences as a young female music critic. The film premiered at the 2025 Toronto International Film Festival.

Her third feature film as a director was the Netflix film Roommates for Happy Madison Productions, which was released in April 2026.

== Filmography ==
=== Film ===
Year	Title	Director	Writer	Producer	Notes
2017	We Forgot to Break Up	Yes	Yes	No	Short film
2022	I Like Movies	Yes	Yes	Yes	Feature-length directorial debut
2025	Mile End Kicks	Yes	Yes	No	
2026	Roommates	Yes	No	No	

=== Television ===
Year	Title	Director	Writer	Producer	Notes
2024	My Dead Mom	Yes	No	No	

== Accolades ==
Award	Year	Category	Work	Result	Refs
Calgary International Film Festival	2022	$10,000 RBC Emerging Artist Award	I Like Movies	Won	
Canadian Screen Awards	2026	Best Original Screenplay	Mile End Kicks	Nominated	
Palm Springs International Film Festival	2026	Variety's 10 Directors to Watch	Mile End Kicks	Honored	
Whistler Film Festival	2025	Best Screenplay in a Borsos Competition Film	Mile End Kicks	Won	
Vancouver Film Critics Circle	2023	Best Canadian Film	I Like Movies	Won	
Vancouver Film Critics Circle	2023	Best Screenplay for a Canadian Film	I Like Movies	Won	
Vancouver Film Critics Circle	2026	Best Director of a Canadian Film	Mile End Kicks	Nominated	
Vancouver Film Critics Circle	2026	Best Screenplay for a Canadian Film	Mile End Kicks	Nominated	
