= Mike McGlone =

American actor

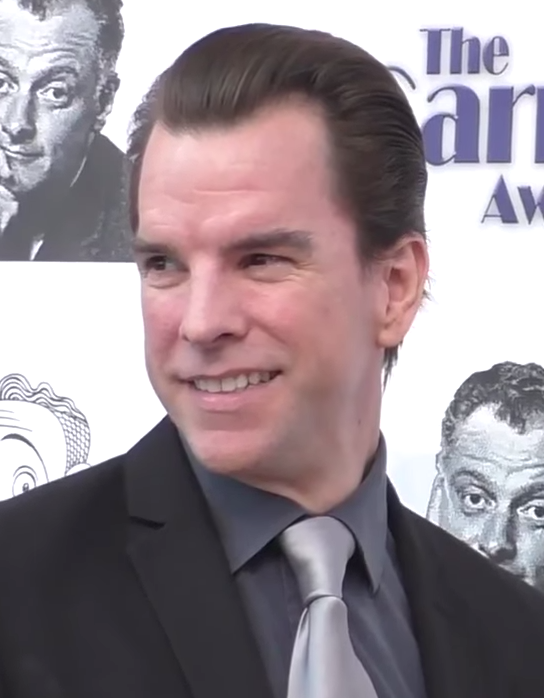
- McGlone at the Carney Awards in 2016
- Born: Michael McGlone; White Plains, New York
- Occupations: Actor filmmaker
- Years active: 1993-present
- Website: www.michaelmcglone.com

Michael McGlone is an American actor, writer, singer/songwriter, comedian and filmmaker. He is best known for his roles in the Irish American Edward Burns films The Brothers McMullen and She's the One, as well as having portrayed the film noiresque spokesman for GEICO insurance, posing rhetorical questions in the vein of Robert Stack or Rod Serling, which are then acted out in humorous fashion.

McGlone's movie credits as actor/director Edward Burns's brother in the 1995 movie The Brothers McMullen and 1996's She's the One were followed by such films as The Bone Collector, Bob Giraldi's Dinner Rush, Hard Ball with Keanu Reeves, and the sequel to The Brothers McMullen, The Family McMullen.

On TV McGlone is known for portraying the fan favorite Detective Szymanski on Person of Interest, the gangster Bobby Moore on STARZ' series Crash and The Kill Point.

His spiritual and inspirational essays have been published in the best-selling books The Success Guidebook and The Peace Guidebook.

McGlone's discography includes the albums HERO, To Be Down, and SPEED...as well as numerous singles...McGlone's Music

== Filmography ==
=== Film ===
Year	Title	Role	Notes
1995	The Brothers McMullen	Patrick McMullen	credited as Mike McGlone
1996	Ed	Oliver Barnett	
1996	She's the One	Francis "Franny" Fitzpatrick	
1998	One Tough Cop	Richie La Cassa	
1999	Jump	Doug	
1999	The Bone Collector	Detective Kenny Solomon	
2000	Happy Accidents	Tab	
2000	Dinner Rush	Carmen	
2001	Hardball	Jimmy Fleming	
2001	Get Well Soon	Gunman Brian Maher	
2003	A Walk in the Dark	Nick	Short film
2003	Glengarry, Bob Ross	Brecht Raven	Short film
2005	The War Within	Mike O'Reilly	
2005	Fortunes	James Dougherty	
2006	Dirty Work	Frank Sullivan	
2010	Kidnapping 101	Finley	Short film
2012	The Fitzgerald Family Christmas	Quinn Fitzgerald	
2013	The Little Tin Man	Lawyer Ron	
2013	A Guy Named Rick	Duke Cozwell	
2015	Fall 4 You	Charlie	Short film
2015	Blind Pass	Hunter Anderson	
2017	Lost Cat Corona	Johnny the Funeral Director	
2017	The Bachelors	Coach Keyes	
2022	Peace At Home	Professor Stan	Short film
2025	The Family McMullen	Patrick McMullen	

=== Television ===
Year	Title	Role	Notes
1997	SUBWAYStories: Tales from the Underground	John T.	segment: "Love on the A Train"
1997–2002	Trauma: Life in the E.R.	Narrator (voice role)	Documentary series regular (69 episodes)
1998–2001	Paramedics	Narrator (voice role)	series regular (18 episodes)
1999	Mummies: Frozen in Time	Narrator (voice role)	Documentary
2001–2002	That's Life	Pat MacClay	recurring role (5 episodes)
2002–2006	I, Detective	Narrator (voice role)	Documentary series regular (24 episodes)
2005	Biography	Narrator (voice role)	Documentary; Episode: "Pirates"
2006	Beyond Top Secret	Narrator (voice role)	Documentary
2007	The Kill Point	Deputy Chief Nolan Abrami	recurring role (7 episodes)
2008	Law & Order: Special Victims Unit	George Tremblay	Episode: "Unorthodox"
2008	Personal Convictions	unknown role (voice role)	unknown episode
2008	Day of the Shark	Narrator (voice role)	Documentary
2008	Killer Virus: Hunt for the Next Plague	Narrator (voice role)	Documentary
2008–2010	Mobsters	Narrator (voice role)	Documentary
2009	Crash	Bobby	recurring role (4 episodes)
2009	Day of the Shark 2	Narrator (voice role)	Documentary
2009	Kidnapped for 18 Years: The Jaycee Dougard Story	Narrator (voice role)	Documentary
2010	Flipped: A Mobster Tells All	Narrator (voice role)	Television Movie
2010	Anatomy of Takedown	Narrator (voice role)	2 episodes – "Green River Killer" – "BTK"
2010	Day of the Shark 3	Narrator (voice role)	Documentary
2010	Hollywood's Hottest Car Chases	Narrator (voice role)	Documentary
2011–2016	Person of Interest	Detective Bill Szymanski	recurring role (5 episodes)
2013	Psych	Mitch Murray	Episode: "Office Space"
2015	Elementary	Lloyd	Episode: "Under My Skin"
2021	Jhon Jatenjor's Interviews	Himself/ Celebrity guest	
2022	S.W.A.T	Baratta	Episode: "Short Fuse"
2023	The Rookie: Feds	DEA Agent Trent	Episode: "Payback"
2023	NCIS: Hawaii	Dennis Lang	Episode: "Nightwatch Two"
2025	Creature Commandos (TV series)	Embassy official	Episode: "A Very Funny Monster"
