= Slayground (2027 film) =

American film by Jeremy Saulnier

- Teaser poster
- Directed by: Jeremy Saulnier
- Written by: Jeremy Saulnier
- Produced by: Rich Peete; Eli Bush; Jeremy Saulnier; Skei Saulnier
- Starring: Cory Michael Smith; Chase Sui Wonders; Stanley Simons; Sophie Wilde; Young Mazino; Imogen Poots; Matty Matheson; James Badge Dale; Stephen Root
- Cinematography: Magnus Nordenhof Jønck
- Music by: Trent Reznor; Atticus Ross
- Production companies: A24; Neighborhood Watch; Niteowl Films; Central Pictures; Bonneville Pictures
- Distributed by: A24
- Release date: January 29, 2027
- Country: United States
- Language: English
- Budget: $35 million

Slayground is an upcoming American action thriller film written, produced and directed by Jeremy Saulnier. It stars Cory Michael Smith, Chase Sui Wonders, Stanley Simons, Sophie Wilde, Young Mazino, Imogen Poots, Matty Matheson, James Badge Dale, and Stephen Root.

The film is scheduled to be released in the United States by A24 on January 29, 2027.

== Premise ==
Set around Halloween, a scare actor with amnesia seeks to uncover the truth behind the murders of his co-workers at the haunted attraction they work at, while evading a manhunt that targets him as the prime suspect.

== Cast ==
- Cory Michael Smith as Michael Chaplain "Metal Mike" Graves
- Chase Sui Wonders
- Stanley Simons
- Sophie Wilde
- Young Mazino
- Imogen Poots
- Matty Matheson
- James Badge Dale
- Stephen Root
- Macon Blair
- Rryla McIntosh

== Production ==
In June 2025, it was announced by A24 that Jeremy Saulnier would direct, write, and produce a Halloween-set action thriller film titled October, with Cory Michael Smith in his first lead film role. In August, Chase Sui Wonders and Sophie Wilde joined the cast. The next month, Stanley Simons, Young Mazino, and Stephen Root joined the cast. Production had commenced by October, with James Badge Dale, Matty Matheson, and Imogen Poots being added to the cast. Filming was scheduled to take place in Vancouver from September 22 to December 3, 2025, under the working title Moustache.

In September 2026, the film had been retitled to Slayground. The following month, Trent Reznor and Atticus Ross were reported to be composing the film's score.

== Release ==
Slayground was originally planned to be released in the United States in October 2026. The film is scheduled to be theatrically released on January 29, 2027.
