= Stanley Simons =

American actor

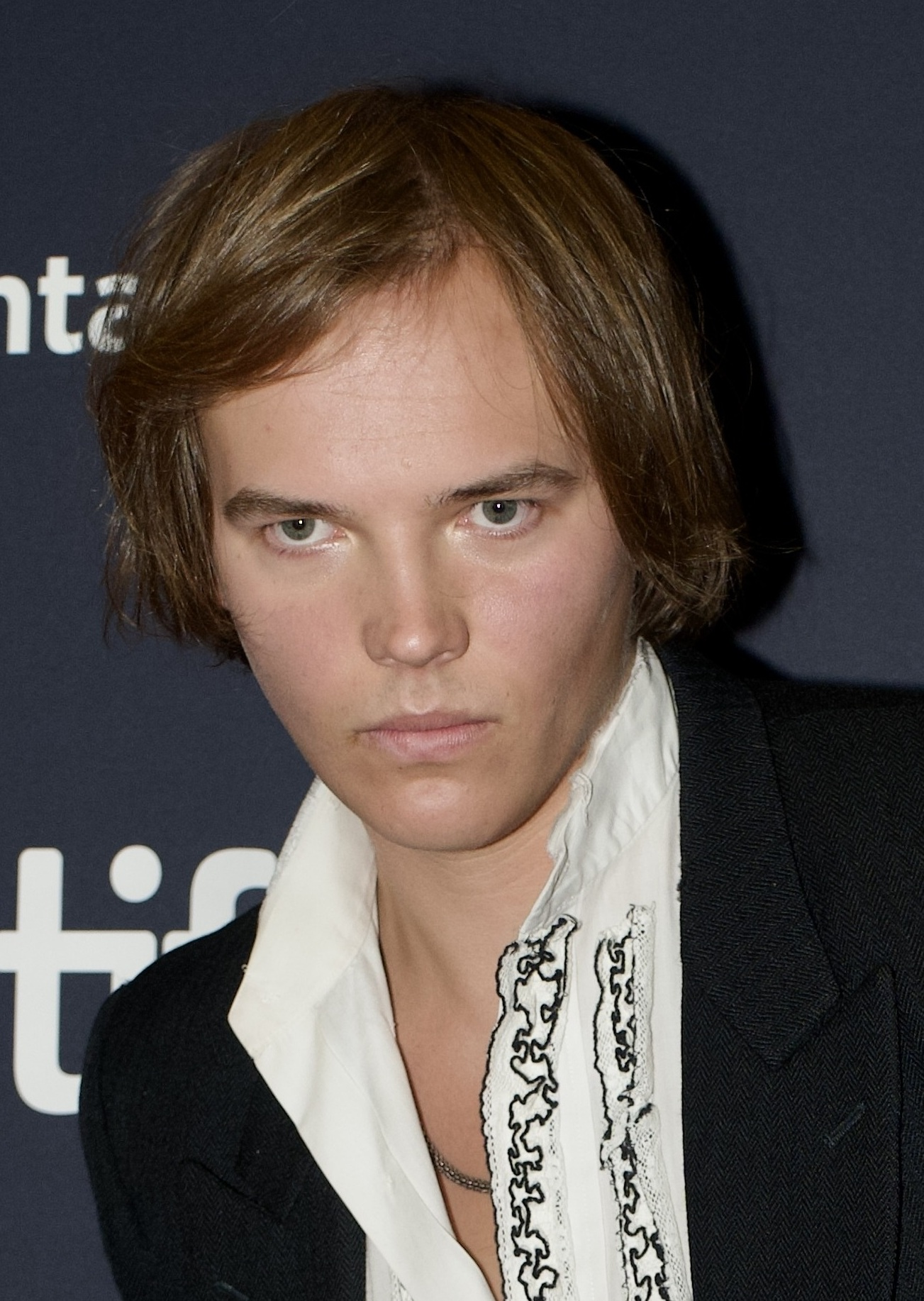
- Simons in 2025
- Born: 1999 or 2000 (age 25–26); Sydney, Australia
- Citizenship: American
- Occupation: Actor
- Years active: 2019–present

Stanley Simons is an American actor. He is known for his performance in Sean Durkin's 2023 film The Iron Claw. He has also appeared in the 2019 film Angelfish directed by Peter Andrew Lee, the 2021 film Superior directed by Erin Vassilopoulos, and the 2025 film Mile End Kicks, directed by Chandler Levack.

== Early life ==
Simons was born in Sydney, Australia, and later lived in Shanghai, Hong Kong, and Brooklyn.

== Filmography ==
=== Film ===
Year	Title	Role	Notes
2019	Angelfish	Conor	
2020	Tyler Works at the Gas Station		Short film
2022	Superior	Miles	
2023	The Iron Claw	Mike Von Erich	
2025	Rocky's	Greg	
2025	Mile End Kicks	Chevy	
2026	Via Negativa	Joe	Post-production
2027	Slayground		Post-production

=== Television ===
Year	Title	Role	Notes
2019	Model Boy	Paris	YouTube series
2019	Two Sentence Horror Stories	Izzy McAllister	S2 E5
2019	Law & Order: Special Victims Unit	Isaac Franklin	S21 E4
2020	Little America	Smoking kid	S1 E1

=== Theatre ===
Year	Title	Role	Venue	Ref.
2026	The Saviors	Julian	Off-Broadway, Atlantic Theatre Company	
