= Fish Bones =

- Directed by: Joanne Mony Park
- Written by: Joanne Mony Park
- Produced by: M. G. Evangelista; Carolina Tamez Rodriguez; Joanne Mony Park
- Starring: Joony Kim; Cris Gris
- Cinematography: Sheldon Chau
- Edited by: Yael Urbach; Joanne Mony Park
- Music by: John Kimbrough
- Release date: 19 January 2018 (Slamdance Film Festival)
- Running time: 82 minutes
- Country: United States
- Language: English

Fish Bones is a 2018 American romantic drama film directed by Joanne Mony Park, starring Joony Kim and Cris Gris.

== Cast ==
- Joony Kim as Hana Kim
- Cris Gris as Nicole
- Borah Ahn as Hana's Mother
- Young Mazino as Peter Kim
- Allison Lanier as Bella
- Anton Obeid as Nico's Father
- Rew Starr as Nico's Mother

== Release ==
The film premiered at the Slamdance Film Festival on 19 January 2018.

== Plot ==
The film revolves around Hana, a young Korean immigrant from a conservative family. She struggles with her sexuality and falls in love with Nico, a Latina music producer. After returning home to help her ailing mother, Hana's budding romance with Nico puts her at odds with her family's traditional values.

The film explores the themes of cultural identity, sexuality and conflict between personal desires and family expectations.

== Reception ==
Shelagh Rowan-Legg of ScreenAnarchy called the film "subtle and effective".

Kathy Rong Zhou of SLUG Magazine wrote that the film "reaches an unexpected foothold and strikes a pleasant balance, adorned by the film’s subdued, impeccable visuals".

Justin Lowe of The Hollywood Reporter wrote that the film is "Too insubstantial to make a lasting impression."
