= Superior (film) =

- Poster
- Directed by: Erin Vassilopoulos
- Written by: Erin Vassilopoulos; Alessandra Mesa
- Based on: Superior by Erin Vassilopoulos
- Produced by: Ben Cohen; Grant Curatola; Patrick Donovan
- Starring: Alessandra Mesa; Ani Mesa; Pico Alexander; Jake Hoffman
- Cinematography: Mia Cioffi Henry
- Edited by: Jennifer Ruff; Erin Vassilopoulos
- Music by: Jessica Moss
- Production companies: LOU; Nice Dissolve
- Distributed by: Factory 25
- Release dates: January 30, 2021 (Sundance); March 25, 2022 (United States)
- Running time: 99 minutes
- Country: United States
- Language: English
- Box office: $565

Superior is a 2021 American thriller/drama film directed by Erin Vassilopoulos in their feature-length directorial debut, based on her 2015 short film of the same name. The film was co-written by Erin Vassilopoulos and Alessandra Mesa. The film stars Alessandra Mesa and Ani Mesa (reprising their roles from the short), Pico Alexander and Jake Hoffman.

The film held its world premiere at the 2021 Sundance Film Festival on January 30, 2021 and received a theatrical release in the United States on March 25, 2022 by Factory 25.

== Premise ==
On the run, Marian returns to her hometown to hide out with her identical twin sister, Vivian, and in doing so alters the trajectory of both their lives.

== Cast ==
The cast include:

- Alessandra Mesa as Marian
- Anamari Mesa as Vivian
- Pico Alexander as Robert
- Jake Hoffman as Michael
- Stanley Simons as Miles
- Christopher Dylan White as Dean
- Cara Ronzetti as Sasha
- Marcus Thompson Jr. as Club Bouncer

== Release ==
The film premiered at the 2021 Sundance Film Festival on January 30, 2021. Visit Films then acquired the film's international sales rights, while Creative Artists Agency acquired its US sales rights. Factory 25 later acquired the film's distribution rights and released it on March 25, 2022 at BAM Cinemas in New York followed by a nationwide expansion.

== Reception ==
On the review aggregator website Rotten Tomatoes, 66% of 29 critics' reviews are positive, with an average rating of 5.90/10. The website's consensus reads: "Narratively thin but visually stylish, Superior puts a noirish spin on its examination of fraught sibling dynamics." Metacritic, which uses a weighted average, assigned the film a score of 59 out of 100, based on 7 critics, indicating "mixed or average" reviews.

Jessica Klang of Variety wrote "It might all get too pastiche-y, except that Vassilopoulos is quietly confident in the artificiality of her approach and leans into it, with mordant poker-faced wit and defiant stylishness that give us ample reason to take the twin trope out for another twisty turn around the block. It’s about blurred lines, collapsing identities and merging subjectivities, but the sly, slick little "Superior" knows just who it is."

Nick Allen of RogerEbert.com wrote "It's the kind of movie in which you can only imagine the vision boards and scrapbooks and planning that went into pre-production. Along with the rich color palette from the film stock, you want to love "Superior" based on such a visual commitment. But while that intention sucks you in, the story leaves you floundering."
