= Phil (film) =

2019 Canadian comedy-drama film

- Film poster
- Directed by: Greg Kinnear
- Written by: Stephen Mazur
- Produced by: Aaron L. Gilbert; Sandy Stern; Bradley Thomas
- Starring: Greg Kinnear; Emily Mortimer; Jay Duplass; Robert Forster; Taylor Schilling; Kurt Fuller; Luke Wilson; Bradley Whitford
- Cinematography: John Bailey
- Edited by: David Rosenbloom
- Music by: Rolfe Kent
- Production companies: Bron Studios; Creative Wealth Media Finance; Imperative Entertainment
- Distributed by: Quiver Distribution
- Release dates: April 5, 2019 (Sarasota); July 5, 2019 (United States)
- Running time: 106 minutes
- Country: Canada
- Language: English

Phil is a 2019 Canadian comedy-drama film directed by Greg Kinnear and starring Kinnear, Emily Mortimer, Jay Duplass, Robert Forster, Taylor Schilling, Kurt Fuller, Luke Wilson and Bradley Whitford. It is Kinnear's directorial debut.

== Plot ==
Phil is a middle-aged, divorced dentist who's mildly depressed. One day Michael Fisk, a published author, comes in to get some last minute dental work on referral from another dentist.

Lonely, and drawn to Michael for his proactive view of life, as he's enthused about the success his book is having, his college-aged daughter is coming home soon. Phil coincides with him and his family in a local restaurant. Afterwards he follows them home.

After Michael warmly kisses his wife, Phil follows him in his car. After he parks along a quiet country road he walks into the woods. Phil follows, but to his shock he finds Michael hanging by his neck. Shaken up, he takes the shoes Michael had weirdly taken off beforehand.

After the funeral, Phil goes to the grave distraught, and falls asleep on the mound amidst a heavy rainstorm. The next morning, Michael's wife Alicia finds him there, soaked to the skin. As she calls 911, he says ros, which causes her to believe he's his old friend from Greece.

Alicia takes 'Spyros' home to get warmed up. She tells him about a bathroom project Michael had left infinished, and without thinking, he volunteers to help. Meanwhile, his dentist receptionist leaves him a string of frantic messages, which are left unanswered.

Michael's father-in-law comes by and doesn't realise Phil's not the real Spyros. In town, Phil runs into his brother Malcolm, and explains he will later explain what's going on. After many, many attempts, he figures out his computer password.

Seeing pictures of Michael with Samantha on the computer, when Alicia is called in to clear out her husband's university office, Phil offers to tag along. Sam is rather odd with Alicia, explaining she hadn't gone to the funeral because of a work commitment. Alicia later tells him that she'd gotten a position over him because he'd turned it down.

Police Detective Welling stops by to tell Alicia that they are investigating Michael's suicide, noticing only two anomalies, his missing shoes and a possible stalker, both of which are Phil. That night, she calls 'Spyros' to meet, and talks him into trying to dance with a group of Greeks.

Malcolm is there when Phil gets home, and he tries to get him to realise that what Alicia needs is closure. Shortly thereafter 'Styros' presents her with her finished bathroom. Phil is able to apologize to his daughter Molly and finally offer her genuine support.

Alicia asks 'Styros' to accompany her and her daughter at a university event, and a higher up, who doesn't trust him, tries to out him. Phil skillfully tells the truth about meeting at the dentist's and spying on him without saying it was his own practise in town. Then Samantha shows up, pregnant and wearing half of a set of pendants like Michael had bought.

The tiles start falling off as Alicia takes her first shower, and the water pressure goes wacky. Just as 'Spyros' is arriving to help, Detective Welling has arrived to tell her they discovered who had been the 'peeping Tom'. When questioned by the officer, he explained he needed to know why someone who seemed to have a perfect life could end it.

Alicia has placed a restraining order on him, he returns to his abandoned office and finds his loyal receptionist quit on him. Alicia confronts him to show him the theory of Michael's affair was wrong as Samantha is a lesbian. Phil again goes to the bridge's edge, accidentally falls in and fights against dying. Malcolm visits him in the hospital and he tells he's no longer depressed.

Waking suddenly one night, Phil remembers Michael's shoes. He delivers the note inside to Alicia. We never discover what was on it, but she starts playing the cello again and stops wearing her wedding ring. Phil eventually revamps his dental practise, and improves his relationship with Molly. Alicia shows she's made peace by returning a cap she'd given 'Styros'

== Cast ==
- Greg Kinnear as Phil
- Emily Mortimer as Alicia
- Bradley Whitford as Michael Fisk
- Luke Wilson as Detective Welling
- Jay Duplass as Malcolm
- Robert Forster as Bing Fisk
- Megan Charpentier as Molly
- April Cameron as Rahel
- Taylor Schilling as Samantha Ford
- Kurt Fuller as Dean Wurtz
- Sarah Dugdale as Kara
- William B. Davis as Father Grant
- Isaiah Lehtinen as Teen #1

== Release ==
The film had its world premiere at the Sarasota Film Festival on April 5, 2019 and in other United States theaters on July 5, 2019.

== Reception ==
The film has a 27% approval rating on Rotten Tomatoes, based on 26 reviews with an average score of 4.5/10. Jeffrey M. Anderson of Common Sense Media awarded the film two stars out of five. Lorry Kikta of Film Threat awarded it eight stars out of ten. Nick Allen of RogerEbert.com gave the film one and a half stars. David Ehrlich of IndieWire graded the film a C−.
