= Inès (film) =

2021 Canadian drama film

- Directed by: Renée Beaulieu
- Written by: Renée Beaulieu
- Produced by: Renée Beaulieu
- Starring: Rosalie Bonenfant; Roy Dupuis; Martin Dubreuil
- Cinematography: Philippe St-Gelais
- Edited by: Renée Beaulieu; Martin Bourgault
- Music by: David Thomas
- Production company: Les Productions du moment
- Distributed by: Fimoption
- Release date: December 1, 2021 (Whistler)
- Running time: 89 minutes
- Country: Canada
- Language: French

Inès is a Canadian coming-of-age drama film, directed by Renée Beaulieu and released in 2021.

The film stars Rosalie Bonenfant as Inès, a woman who has just turned 20 years old, and whose mother Claudelle (Noémie Godin-Vigneau) has been in a coma for several years. Stuck in an unhealthy, codependent relationship with her father Christian (Roy Dupuis), she struggles to find a way to break free and chart a new course for her life.

The cast also includes Martin Dubreuil, Alexandre Pronovost, Maxime Dumontier, Mélanie Pilon, Nikki Bohm, Laurence Champagne, Noémie Evangelho, George Hebert, Laurence Latreille, Jonathan Robert, Camille Poirier, David-Emmanuel Jauniaux, Philippe Robidoux, Dany Gange and Juliette Gariépy.

The film premiered in the Borsos Competition program at the 2021 Whistler Film Festival, before going into commercial release in May 2022.
