= Indignation (film) =

- Theatrical release poster
- Directed by: James Schamus
- Screenplay by: James Schamus
- Based on: Indignation by Philip Roth
- Produced by: Anthony Bregman; James Schamus; Rodrigo Teixeira
- Starring: Logan Lerman; Sarah Gadon; Tracy Letts; Linda Emond; Danny Burstein; Ben Rosenfield; Pico Alexander; Philip Ettinger; Noah Robbins
- Cinematography: Christopher Blauvelt
- Edited by: Andrew Marcus
- Music by: Jay Wadley
- Production companies: Likely Story; Symbolic Exchange
- Distributed by: Summit Entertainment; Roadside Attractions
- Release dates: January 24, 2016 (Sundance); July 29, 2016
- Running time: 111 minutes
- Country: United States
- Language: English
- Box office: $3.4 million

Indignation is a 2016 American drama film written, produced, and directed by James Schamus. The film, based on the 2008 novel by Philip Roth, is set mostly in Winesburg, Ohio, in the early 1950s, and stars Logan Lerman, Sarah Gadon, Tracy Letts, Linda Emond, and Danny Burstein.

The film had its world premiere at the Sundance Film Festival on January 24, 2016, and was released theatrically on July 29, 2016, by Roadside Attractions and Summit Entertainment. Lerman's performance received positive reviews from critics and earned him a Best Actor nomination at the Seattle Film Critics Awards.

== Plot ==
Marcus Messner is fighting in the Korean War. After an encounter with Chinese troops, he reflects on the choices he made in his life and how they led him to where he is now.

In the summer of 1951, before his first year of college, Marcus's synagogue in Newark, New Jersey, mourns the death in Korea of one of his classmates. Marcus has been awarded a scholarship to Winesburg College, a private Christian school in Ohio, which allows him to defer the draft. His father, who runs a kosher butcher shop, is unnerved by the deaths in the war of boys like his son and becomes overwhelmed with paranoia.

At Winesburg, Marcus is a studious, introverted pupil who feels disconnected from the rest of the student body, including fellow Jewish students. He meets Olivia Hutton, a beautiful student majoring in French literature. The daughter of a Cleveland surgeon, Olivia is freethinking, sophisticated, and sexually frank, but also fragile and disturbed; she feels as alienated and out-of-place as Marcus. On their first date, Olivia ends the evening by performing fellatio on him. The inexperienced Marcus is so shocked that he avoids her for several weeks. As he and Olivia continue to have sexual relations without intercourse, he learns that she is a recovering alcoholic who had been previously enrolled at Mount Holyoke College. After she attempted suicide, she was admitted to the Menninger clinic. Olivia's parents sent her to Winesburg hoping that the "squareness" of the school would help her become stable. She also makes strong allusions to having been sexually abused by her father.

Marcus decides that he can no longer tolerate his noisy, intrusive roommates and requests to switch to a single room. The university administration schedules a meeting with Dean of Men Caudwell. Though the discussion is ostensibly about the change in his living situation, it becomes an interrogation about Marcus's atheist beliefs and his dislike of Winesburg's conservative culture. The already ill Marcus becomes so agitated that he vomits and passes out.

Marcus is rushed to the hospital, where he has an operation for appendicitis. During recovery, he is visited by a senior student who informs him that Olivia has given blow jobs to nearly everyone else on campus. Marcus's mother also visits him and says that she wants a divorce from his father, who is growing increasingly deranged and can no longer run the shop. She meets Olivia, who has come to bring red and white roses to Marcus, and sees the wrist scar from her suicide attempt; they speak away from Marcus when leaving. The next day, Marcus's mother apologizes to him for oversharing her marital problems and promises not to divorce, but only if he ends his relationship with Olivia. She warns him of the dangers of getting too involved with people who are mentally ill, and that her neediness would ruin his potential.

When Marcus returns to school, he finds that Olivia has disappeared from the campus and goes to Dean Caudwell to find out what happened to her. Olivia suffered a nervous breakdown and was hospitalized again. The school had been hesitant to accept her, given her history of electroshock therapy and relapses, but her father was an esteemed Winesburg alumnus who requested her admission. The Dean demands to know whether Marcus raped and impregnated Olivia; Marcus is outraged and leaves after using an obscenity.

Marcus is expelled after the Dean learns that he paid a student to evade the mandatory chapel requirement, and is drafted. In Korea, Marcus is stabbed with a bayonet during combat. As he collapses, he thinks back on Olivia and wishes that he could tell her that "it's okay, whatever it is. 'Cause someone did love you. At least, I think that's what it was". Decades later, Olivia lives in a nursing home. She notices the red and white roses on the wallpaper, so similar to the ones she once gave Marcus, and smiles.

== Cast ==
- Logan Lerman as Marcus Messner, a working-class Jewish student from New Jersey
- Sarah Gadon as Olivia Hutton, a college student from a wealthy family
- Pico Alexander as Sonny Cottler, a student from an upper-class Jewish family
- Danny Burstein as Max Messner, a butcher and Marcus's father
- Linda Emond as Esther Messner, Max's wife and Marcus's mother
- Tracy Letts as Hawes D. Caudwell, the college's dean
- Ben Rosenfield as Bertram Flusser
- Philip Ettinger as Ron Foxman
- Noah Robbins as Marty Ziegler

== Production ==
In April 2015, Logan Lerman and Sarah Gadon were announced as having joined the cast of the film. James Schamus directed the film from his own script, and also served as a producer, alongside Anthony Bregman and Rodrigo Teixeira, while Stefanie Azpiazu, Avy Eschenasy, and Lerman are among the film's executive producers. In June 2015, Tracy Letts, Linda Emond, and Danny Burstein joined the cast of the film.

=== Filming ===
Principal photography began on June 15, 2015, in New York City, and concluded on July 17.

== Release ==
The film had its world premiere at the Sundance Film Festival on January 24, 2016. Shortly after the film's premiere, Summit Entertainment acquired North American rights to the film for $2.5 million. It was later revealed that Roadside Attractions would co-distribute the film with Summit. It was also screened in the Panorama section of the 66th Berlin International Film Festival. The film was theatrically released on July 29, 2016.

== Critical reception ==
Indignation received positive reviews from film critics, with praise aimed at Schamus's direction and the performances (particularly Lerman's). It holds an 81% approval rating on review aggregator website Rotten Tomatoes, based on 135 reviews, with an average rating of 7.2/10. The site's critical consensus reads, "Indignation proves it's possible to put together an engaging Philip Roth adaptation—and offers a compelling calling card for debuting writer-director James Schamus." On Metacritic, the film holds a rating of 78 out of 100, based on 35 critics, indicating "generally favorable" reviews.

Peter Debruge of Variety gave the film a positive review, writing: "Schamus opted to make Philip Roth's 29th novel his own first feature, choosing an emotional and incredibly personal piece of material (it fictionalizes Roth's own early-'50s college experience) that adapts well to his polite, polished and reasonably old-fashioned aesthetic."
