= Allison Lanier =

American actress

- Occupation: Actress
- Years active: 2017–present
- Television: The Young and the Restless

Allison Lanier is an American actress. She portrayed Summer Newman on the CBS soap opera The Young and the Restless from 2022 to 2025. Lanier previously appeared in the independent films It Happened in L.A., Fish Bones and Mia, and played the recurring role of Annabelle in the third season of Red Oaks. For her role as Summer, Lanier was nominated for the Daytime Emmy Award for Outstanding Supporting Actress in a Drama Series in 2024.

== Life and career ==
Allison Lanier grew up in the Atlanta area. When she was in high school, she worked as a receptionist in her town's gym, which she described as very fun and a "taste of a different life". She then moved to New York City to pursue a career in acting and modelling, where she studied at the William Esper Studio. In 2017, Lanier appeared in a recurring role as Annabelle in the third season of the American comedy-drama Red Oaks. That same year, she appeared as Megan in the comedy film It Happened in L.A.. In 2018, she portrayed Bella in the independent film Fish Bones. The following year, she appeared as Anna in the independent film Mia.

"I have to pinch myself. I love working with these people, and learning from those who have been doing it for years. I feel very grateful to have a small part in the legacy of such an iconic show."

— Lanier on being part of The Young and the Restless (2023)

In April 2022, it was announced that Lanier would take over the role of Summer Newman on the CBS soap opera The Young and the Restless, replacing Hunter King, who chose to not return in the role. Summer's recasting and return coincided with the return of Michael Mealor, who portrays Summer's husband, Kyle Abbott. Lanier began filming for the role on April 12, 2022, and made her first appearance as Summer on May 17 of that year. Lanier had been living in New York prior to receiving the role, and travelled between there and Los Angeles to film, which she called a "huge lifestyle change" due to having to spend most of her time in Los Angeles.

During Lanier's stint on the soap opera, Summer's storylines have focused on her role as a mother, dealing with her mother's faked death, the breakdown of her marriage to Kyle and a romance with Chance Chancellor (Conner Floyd). Lanier enjoyed working with Mealor and exploring Summer's "vulnerable side". In April 2023, Lanier expressed feeling "incredibly lucky" when reflecting on the first anniversary of filming her first episode, writing "I filmed my first episode, countless flights back and forth to NYC, five short-term sublets, 130+ episodes shot, many tears (scripted and otherwise), many lessons, a lot of laughter, new friendships, learning, and one immeasurable love". In 2024, Lanier was nominated for the Daytime Emmy Award for Outstanding Supporting Actress in a Drama Series for her role as Summer.

In April 2025, Lanier announced that she had left her role as Summer. She said that she was grateful for her fans, writing "I've loved the journey and learned so much but it's time to grow in a different direction". Her final episode aired on May 2 of that year. Carolyn Hinsey from Soap Opera Digest opined that Summer's departure was the worst exit of The Young and the Restless in 2025, believing that the "abrupt end" to Lanier's stint "felt rushed and poorly planned".

== Personal life ==
Lanier enjoys interior design and attending flea markets. In her free time, Lanier volunteers at animal shelters. Lanier is friends with her co-star Kelsey Wang, who portrays Allie Nguyen on The Young and the Restless.

== Filmography ==
List of acting roles
| Year | Title | Role | Notes | Ref. |
|---|---|---|---|---|
| 2017 | It Happened in L.A. | Megan | Independent film | |
| 2017 | Red Oaks | Annabelle | Recurring role (season 3) | |
| 2018 | Fish Bones | Bella | Film | |
| 2019 | Mia | Anna | Independent film | |
| 2022–2025 | The Young and the Restless | Summer Newman | Series regular | |

== Awards and nominations ==
List of acting awards and nominations
| Year | Award | Category | Title | Result | Ref. |
|---|---|---|---|---|---|
| 2024 | Daytime Emmy Awards | Outstanding Supporting Actress in a Drama Series | The Young and the Restless | Nominated | |
