= Power House (Magi Merlin album) =

Studio album by Magi Merlin
- Released: July 10, 2026
- Genres: R&B, alt pop
- Length: 35:39
- Label: Bonsound

Power House is the debut album by Canadian musician Magi Merlin.

== Track listing ==
No.	Title	Length
1.	"Welcome Home"	1:01
2.	"SpiceKick"	2:29
3.	"EAT!ME!OUT!"	3:48
4.	"So Smart"	2:49
5.	"Thank You!!!"	3:07
6.	"WHIP"	3:12
7.	"Crawl"	2:09
8.	"pixxxie"	4:04
9.	"Workout"	4:37
10.	"Salt"	1:23
11.	"POPSTAR"	3:18
12.	"Wtvr"	3:37
Total length:		35:39
