= Mile End Kicks =

2025 film by Chandler Levack

- Theatrical release poster
- Directed by: Chandler Levack
- Written by: Chandler Levack
- Produced by: Matthew Miller; Pat Kiely; Julie Groleau
- Starring: Barbie Ferreira; Devon Bostick; Stanley Simons; Juliette Gariépy; Jay Baruchel
- Cinematography: Jeremy Cox
- Edited by: Simone Smith
- Music by: Cecile Believe
- Production companies: Banner House Productions; Zapruder Films; XYZ Films; Rhombus Media
- Distributed by: Entract Films; Elevation Pictures
- Release dates: September 4, 2025 (TIFF); April 17, 2026 (Canada)
- Running time: 112 minutes
- Country: Canada
- Language: English
- Budget: $4 million
- Box office: $679,591

Mile End Kicks is a 2025 Canadian coming-of-age romantic comedy film written and directed by Chandler Levack. Based in part on Levack's own young adulthood prior to becoming a professional music critic and filmmaker, the film stars Barbie Ferreira as Grace Pine, a young woman who moves to Montreal, Quebec, in 2011 with the goal of writing a book about Alanis Morissette's album Jagged Little Pill but instead becomes romantically involved with Archie (Devon Bostick) and Chevy (Stanley Simons), two members of the aspiring indie rock band Bone Patrol, and takes a job as the band's publicist. The cast also includes Juliette Gariépy, Robert Naylor, Isaiah Lehtinen and Jay Baruchel.

The film had its world premiere at the Toronto International Film Festival on September 4, 2025. It was released in Canada on April 17, 2026, by Entract Films and Elevation Pictures. It received generally positive reviews from critics and grossed $679,591 against a budget of $4 million.

== Plot ==
In 2011, Grace Pine is a 22-year-old music critic for the alt-weekly magazine Merge Weekly in Toronto. One summer, she moves to Montreal to write a 33 ⅓ book about Alanis Morissette's album Jagged Little Pill. She rents an apartment in Montreal's Mile End neighbourhood she found on Craigslist with roommate Madeleine, a local DJ whose boyfriend Hugo Côté is the drummer for the up-and-coming four-piece indie rock band Bone Patrol. After pitching her book to New York City editor Phoebe Reilly via Skype, Grace lands a publishing deal and receives a $500 advance.

On Grace's first night in Montreal, Madeleine invites her to a loft party where she is DJing. There, Grace meets Archie Webber, the sensitive and winsome guitarist for Bone Patrol, and smokes marijuana with him. Watching a performance by Bone Patrol at the party, Grace becomes instantly attracted to Chevy Olsen, the pretentious, self-absorbed lead singer. Although Madeleine describes Chevy as "the worst guy in Montreal", Grace approaches him after the concert, and they have a brief and awkward conversation.

Grace leaves the party at dawn with Archie and they bond on the way home, only to find that they are next-door neighbours. Grace invites Archie to have sex with her in her apartment, but he reveals he is celibate for personal reasons. Later, Grace visits the nearby Mile End Kicks shoe store, where Chevy works a day job. When Chevy mentions that Bone Patrol's debut EP will be released soon, Grace offers to be the band's publicist, and he agrees.

After finding that she has no money in her bank account, Grace emails Jeff, her former editor at Merge, about the $4,000 he owes her. A flashback reveals that she had been having an affair with Jeff, who is married. Putting her Alanis book aside, Grace writes a review of Bone Patrol's debut EP for the Montreal Mirror. Later, Grace tries to initiate sex with Chevy in her apartment, but after they briefly make out, he suggests that they keep their relationship strictly professional.

Jeff replies to Grace's email saying that her invoice has already been processed. That evening, Grace and Archie attend a loft party where she intends to read an excerpt from her Alanis book as part of a poetry reading. While talking privately to Archie at the party, Chevy describes Grace as a "cum dumpster". When it is Grace's turn at the reading, Archie encourages her to read, but she instead leaves with Chevy. As Grace and Chevy are having sex at his house, he abruptly stops, saying he cannot achieve an erection for her.

Returning home that night, Grace listens to a voicemail from Phoebe informing her that her contract has been terminated due to her lack of communication. As Grace breaks down in tears, Madeleine accuses her of being selfish and reminds her that she owes her two months of rent. The next day, Archie tells Grace that he is celibate because he has oral herpes, which he contracted from a girl he had hooked up with. He also confesses his feelings for Grace, but when she mentions that she has been seeing Chevy, Archie blurts out that Chevy called her a "cum dumpster" at the poetry reading.

Defeated, Grace moves back home to Toronto. At the Merge office, she confronts Jeff over his poor treatment of her and demands her $4,000 check. She then returns to Montreal for Bone Patrol's EP launch, where she pays Madeleine for the rent she owed and they make amends. Chevy attempts to make a romantic gesture to Grace before awkwardly kissing her, but she rebuffs him, telling him to "fuck off". At a subsequent poetry reading, Grace reads a piece about her own experiences as a female music critic in male-dominated environments.

Before returning home to Toronto, Grace spends the day with Archie driving around in the Bone Patrol van. The two eventually kiss and prepare to have sex while in the van.

== Cast ==
- Barbie Ferreira as Grace Pine
- Devon Bostick as Archie Webber
- Stanley Simons as Chevy Olsen
- Juliette Gariépy as Madeleine
- Robert Naylor as Hugo Côté
- Isaiah Lehtinen as Jesse Matthews
- Aurora Browne as Nora Pine
- Alain Goulem as Garth Pine
- Sabrina Jalees as Phoebe Reilly
- Jay Baruchel as Jeff
- Emily Lê as Penelope
- Magi Merlin as Chloé

== Production ==
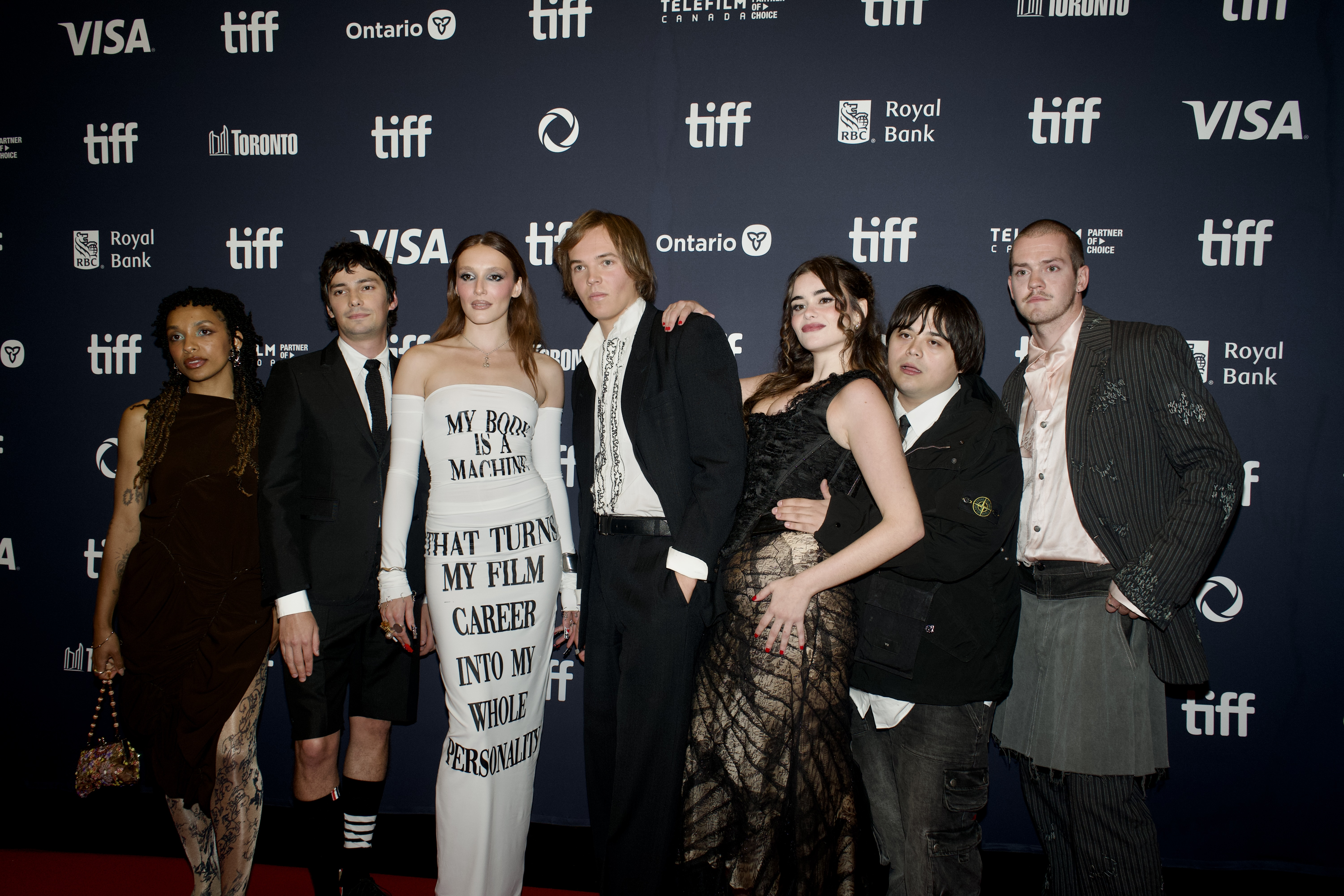
Cast at the 2025 Toronto International Film Festival

The film's original screenplay outline, submitted under the working title Anglophone, was announced in 2016 as the winner of a competition for emerging women screenwriters staged by Zapruder Films, the production company of Matthew Miller. The prize was $12,000 and the services of a professional story editor to help develop and complete the full screenplay.

Most of the cast was announced in August 2024, with Baruchel's casting announced toward the end of production. The film was shot in August and September 2024 in Montreal.

Levack has said the production budget of the film was approximately $4 million, a significant increase from her previous feature I Like Movies, which cost about $130,000.

The Montreal indie rock band Tops wrote two original songs for the soundtrack.

== Release ==
Mile End Kicks had its world premiere at the Toronto International Film Festival on September 4, 2025. The film was also screened in the Borsos Competition program of the 2025 Whistler Film Festival. It was screened at the Kingston Canadian Film Festival on February 28 and March 1, 2026. The film was released theatrically on April 17, 2026, in Canada by Elevation Pictures (with Entract Films releasing in Quebec) and in the United States by Sumerian Pictures.

== Reception ==
=== Critical response ===
On the review aggregator website Rotten Tomatoes, 87% of 52 critics' reviews are positive, with an average rating of 6.7/10. The website's consensus reads: "A loosely structured yet emotionally sharp coming-of-age film, Mile End Kicks captures early 20s aimlessness with authentic charm, lifted by Barbie Ferreira's natural lead turn and Chandler Levack's confident, unsentimental direction." Metacritic, which uses a weighted average, assigned the film a score of 77 out of 100, based on eight critics, indicating "generally favorable" reviews.

Shelagh Rowan-Legg of Screen Anarchy wrote that "with a vibrant palette, a terrific soundtrack, Mile End Kicks might lose a little bit of steam as it stretches out the ending, but it's a worthy entry to contemporary romcoms, one that acknowledges sex, queerness, money troubles, sexism, how any of us can get caught in the trap of not knowing our own worth, and learning to embrace our love, our anger, and our talent".

Alex Hudson of Exclaim! wrote that "if there was ever a film that's a perfect bullseye for Exclaim! Magazine, it's surely Mile End Kicks, which is about trying to make it as a music critic in the halcyon days of Montreal's indie rock boom. It's got original music from TOPS, live footage of Islands, a background character named Claire who I'm pretty sure is supposed to be Grimes snorting drugs off a toilet, and even shots of an inbox full of emails from publicist Brendan Bourke."

The film was named to the Toronto International Film Festival's annual year-end Canada's Top Ten list for 2025.

=== Accolades ===
Award	Date of ceremony	Category	Recipient(s)	Result	Ref.
Canadian Screen Awards	2026	Sustainable Production Award	Mile End Kicks	Won	
Canadian Screen Awards	2026	Best Supporting Performance in a Comedy Film	Devon Bostick	Nominated	
Canadian Screen Awards	2026	Best Original Screenplay	Chandler Levack	Nominated	
Canadian Screen Awards	2026	Best Editing	Simone Smith	Won	
Canadian Screen Awards	2026	Best Sound Editing	Elma Bello, Gabe Knox, James Bastable and Michelle Irving	Nominated	
Canadian Screen Awards	2026	Best Sound Mixing	Michelle Irving, Jeremy Fong and Pablo Villegas	Nominated	
Canadian Screen Awards	2026	Best Original Song	David Carriere and Jane Penny, "A/S/L"	Nominated	
Canadian Screen Awards	2026	Best Casting in a Film	Annie St-Pierre	Nominated	
Palm Springs International Film Festival	2026	Variety's 10 Directors to Watch	Chandler Levack	Honored	
Whistler Film Festival	2025	Best Screenplay in a Borsos Competition Film	Chandler Levack	Won	
Vancouver Film Critics Circle	2025	Best Canadian Film	Mile End Kicks	Nominated	
Vancouver Film Critics Circle	2025	Best Director of a Canadian Film	Chandler Levack	Nominated	
Vancouver Film Critics Circle	2025	Best Actress in a Canadian Film	Barbie Ferreira	Nominated	
Vancouver Film Critics Circle	2025	Best Supporting Actor in a Canadian Film	Devon Bostick	Won	
Vancouver Film Critics Circle	2025	Best Supporting Actor in a Canadian Film	Stanley Simons	Nominated	
Vancouver Film Critics Circle	2025	Best Supporting Actress in a Canadian Film	Juliette Gariépy	Nominated	
Vancouver Film Critics Circle	2025	Best Screenplay for a Canadian Film	Chandler Levack	Nominated	
