= Via Negativa (film) =

2026 American drama film by Hannah Peterson

- Directed by: Hannah Peterson
- Screenplay by: Hannah Peterson
- Based on: Via Negativa by Daniel Hornsby
- Produced by: Jonah Disend; Bobby Hoppey; Saba Zerehi
- Starring: Young Mazino; MiMi Ryder; Tony Hale; Zoë Winters; Keith Kupferer; Stanley Simons; Carl Clemons-Hopkins; Mamoudou Athie; Jee Young Han; Gabriel Marin
- Cinematography: Maximilian Pittner
- Edited by: Robert Schafer
- Music by: Maxwell Sterling
- Production company: Complementary Colors
- Release date: June 5, 2026 (Tribeca)
- Running time: 97 minutes
- Country: United States
- Language: English

Via Negativa is a 2026 American drama film written and directed by Hannah Peterson. It is based upon the 2020 novel of the same name by Daniel Hornsby. It stars Young Mazino, MiMi Ryder, Tony Hale, Zoë Winters, Keith Kupferer, Stanley Simons, Carl Clemons-Hopkins, Mamoudou Athie and Jee Young Han.

It had its world premiere at Tribeca Festival on June 5, 2026.

== Premise ==
A young priest abandons all he knows and sets off on a road trip following the death of a friend.

== Cast ==
- Young Mazino as Dan
- MiMi Ryder as Anna
- Tony Hale as Bishop Taboret
- Zoë Winters as Beth
- Keith Kupferer as Bruno
- Stanley Simons as Joe
- Carl Clemons-Hopkins as Tim
- Mamoudou Athie as Brian
- Jee Young Han as Clara
- Gabriel Marin as Martin
- Marcus Landrem as "Young" Dan

== Production ==
In September 2021, it was announced Hannah Peterson would direct and write an adaption of the 2020 novel of the same name by Daniel Hornsby, with Complementary Colors set to produce. In August 2025, it was revealed Young Mazino and Tony Hale had joined the cast of the film, with principal photography commencing in Oregon.

== Release ==
It had its world premiere at the Tribeca Festival on June 5, 2026.
