= The Brothers McMullen =

1995 American comedy-drama film

- Theatrical release poster
- Directed by: Edward Burns
- Written by: Edward Burns
- Produced by: Edward Burns; Dick Fisher
- Starring: Jack Mulcahy; Mike McGlone; Edward Burns; Connie Britton; Maxine Bahns; Elizabeth P. McKay; Shari Albert; Jennifer Jostyn
- Cinematography: Dick Fisher
- Edited by: Dick Fisher
- Music by: Seamus Egan
- Production companies: Fox Searchlight Pictures; Good Machine; Brothers McMullen Productions; Marlboro Road Gang Productions; Videography Productions
- Distributed by: 20th Century Fox
- Release dates: January 1995 (Sundance Film Festival); August 11, 1995 (United States)
- Running time: 98 minutes
- Country: United States
- Language: English
- Budget: $25,000 (Sundance showing) $238,000 (full release)
- Box office: $19.3 million

The Brothers McMullen is a 1995 American comedy-drama film written, directed, produced by, and starring Edward Burns. It deals with the lives of the three Irish Catholic McMullen brothers from Long Island, New York, over three months, as they grapple with basic ideas and values—love, sex, marriage, religion and family—in the 1990s. It was the first Fox Searchlight film.

A sequel, The Family McMullen, was released on October 15, 2025.

== Plot ==
Finbar "Barry" McMullen stands at the grave of his recently deceased father, along with his mother, who tells him that she's returning to her native Ireland to be with Finbar O'Shaughnessy (after whom Barry is named), her sweetheart of long ago. She tells Barry that while she gave Barry's father 35 of the best years of her life, she's going to start living life her way with Finbar O'Shaughnessy, the man she really loves.

Barry's brother Jack has purchased their parents' home and lives in it with his wife Molly. Jack is torn between his love for Molly and his lust for Ann, a former romantic interest of Barry.

Barry and the youngest brother Patrick ask to temporarily move in with Jack, to which he reluctantly agrees. Patrick plans to break his engagement to Susan, but becomes depressed when she breaks up with him. After much pleading, Susan decides to take him back. Patrick then decides to end the relationship for good for Leslie, an auto mechanic. They head to California together in a classic car that Leslie has been working on.

Barry shows no interest in a long-term relationship until he meets Audrey, a woman whom he accuses of "stealing" an apartment that he was trying to rent for himself. Although things do not go well between them at first, they warm to one another and start a relationship.

Molly learns of Jack's affair after finding a wrapped condom in his pants as she is cleaning up after him one day. She confronts Jack, but he refuses to discuss it.

Jack finally breaks it off for good with Ann. He then returns home determined to rebuild his wounded marriage, but not before paying a visit to his father's grave, promising that he will be a better husband to his wife than his father was, pouring a bottle of Irish whiskey over the grave.

Barry decides to move in with Audrey and take their relationship to the next level. The three brothers gather at the family homestead with a newfound belief in love and a desire not to let the ghosts of the past stand in their way.

== Cast ==
- Shari Albert as Susan
- Maxine Bahns as Audrey
- Catherine Bolz as Mrs. McMullen
- Connie Britton as Molly McMullen
- Edward Burns as Barry (Finbar) McMullen
- Peter Johansen as Marty
- Jennifer Jostyn as Leslie
- Michael McGlone as Patrick McMullen
- Elizabeth McKay as Ann
- Jack Mulcahy as Jack McMullen

== Production ==
Edward Burns wrote the screenplay in the spring of 1993 while working as a production assistant for Entertainment Tonight in New York City, where he worked for cameraman Dick Fisher, who later produced and edited the film. Burns' own Irish Catholic background fed into the screenplay, and the film was mostly shot in Burns' real-life family home, a house in the Valley Stream community of Long Island, New York. Shooting took place on weekends over an eight-month period in New York.

The film, which was shot on 16mm film, originally cost only $25,000, essentially the cost of raw stock and processing. Burns saved money by placing an advertisement in Backstage magazine looking for Irish-American actors willing to work for free.

When Robert Redford was at the Entertainment Tonight studios for an interview, Burns approached him at the elevator and gave him a copy of the film, asking Redford to watch it. Redford later extended an invitation to show it at the Sundance Film Festival. The showing led to a distribution deal, which included an additional $213,000 for post-production work and to get the rights for the Sarah McLachlan song "I Will Remember You", which was added over the closing credits.

== Reception ==
When it won the Grand Jury Prize at the 1995 Sundance Film Festival, it was picked up for distribution by 20th Century Fox and grossed $10.4 million at the US and Canadian box office. It grossed $19.3 million worldwide and, based on a cost-to-return ratio, it was the most profitable film of the year. According to Tom Rothman, it was also the first film ever released by Fox Searchlight Pictures, which Rothman started for 20th Century Fox, in order to release Independent, Dramedy, Foreign and Arthouse films. Edward Burns was called "The New Woody Allen" and even continued to make Woody Allen-esque films afterwards.

On the review aggregator website Rotten Tomatoes, 88% of 41 critics' reviews are positive, with an average rating of 7.2/10. The website's consensus reads: "Like many twenty-somethings, The Brothers McMullen can be a tad self-absorbed, but they're still likely to win you over with their (slightly profane) charm." Metacritic, which uses a weighted average, assigned the film a score of 73 out of 100, based on 20 critics, indicating "generally favorable" reviews.

== Sequel ==
In 2012, Burns revealed that he had begun outlining a sequel to the film. In 2024, he confirmed that he had nearly finished the screenplay. That sequel, titled The Family McMullen, began filming in New Jersey and Brooklyn in April 2025. It features Burns, Britton and McGlone reprising their roles from the original. The film was released on October 15, 2025.

== Awards ==
- Sundance Film Festival 1995 — Grand Jury Prize
- Independent Spirit Award 1995 — Best First Feature
- Deauville Film Festival 1995 — Jury Special Prize (Edward Burns)
