= The Family McMullen =

2025 film by Edward Burns

- Theatrical release poster
- Directed by: Edward Burns
- Written by: Edward Burns
- Produced by: Ellen H. Schwartz; Aaron Lubin; Edward Burns
- Starring: Connie Britton; Edward Burns; Michael McGlone; Tracee Ellis Ross; Halston Sage; Juliana Canfield; Pico Alexander; Brian d'Arcy James
- Cinematography: William Rexer
- Edited by: Janet Gaynor
- Music by: Séamus Egan
- Production company: Marlboro Road Gang Productions
- Distributed by: Warner Bros. Pictures; Fathom Entertainment
- Release date: October 15, 2025
- Running time: 113 minutes
- Country: United States
- Language: English

The Family McMullen is a 2025 American comedy-drama film written, produced, and directed by Edward Burns. It serves as the sequel to The Brothers McMullen (1995). Connie Britton, Burns and Michael McGlone reprise their roles from the first film, alongside Tracee Ellis Ross, Halston Sage, Juliana Canfield, Pico Alexander, and Brian d'Arcy James.

The film was released in the United States on October 15, 2025.

== Cast ==
- Connie Britton as Molly McMullen
- Edward Burns as Barry (Finbar) McMullen
- Michael McGlone as Patrick McMullen
- Tracee Ellis Ross as Nina Martin
- Juliana Canfield as Karen Martin
- Pico Alexander as Thomas "Tommy" McMullen
- Brian d'Arcy James as Walter
- Halston Sage as Patricia "Patty” McMullen
- Bryan Fitzgerald as Terrence Joseph
- Shari Albert as Susan
- Sam Vartholomeos as Sam Dukakis

== Production ==
Principal photography on The Family McMullen began in April 2025 in New York and New Jersey, with Edward Burns, Connie Britton, and Michael McGlone reprise their roles from the first film, Tracee Ellis Ross, Juliana Canfield, Pico Alexander, Brian d'Arcy James, and Halston Sage joining the cast. In September 2025, Fathom Entertainment acquired the distribution rights to the film, partnering with Warner Bros. Pictures.

== Release ==
The film was released in the United States on October 15, 2025, for one night only. The film premiered on HBO Max in the United States on December 5 of that year.
