= Magi Merlin =

Canadian musician and actress

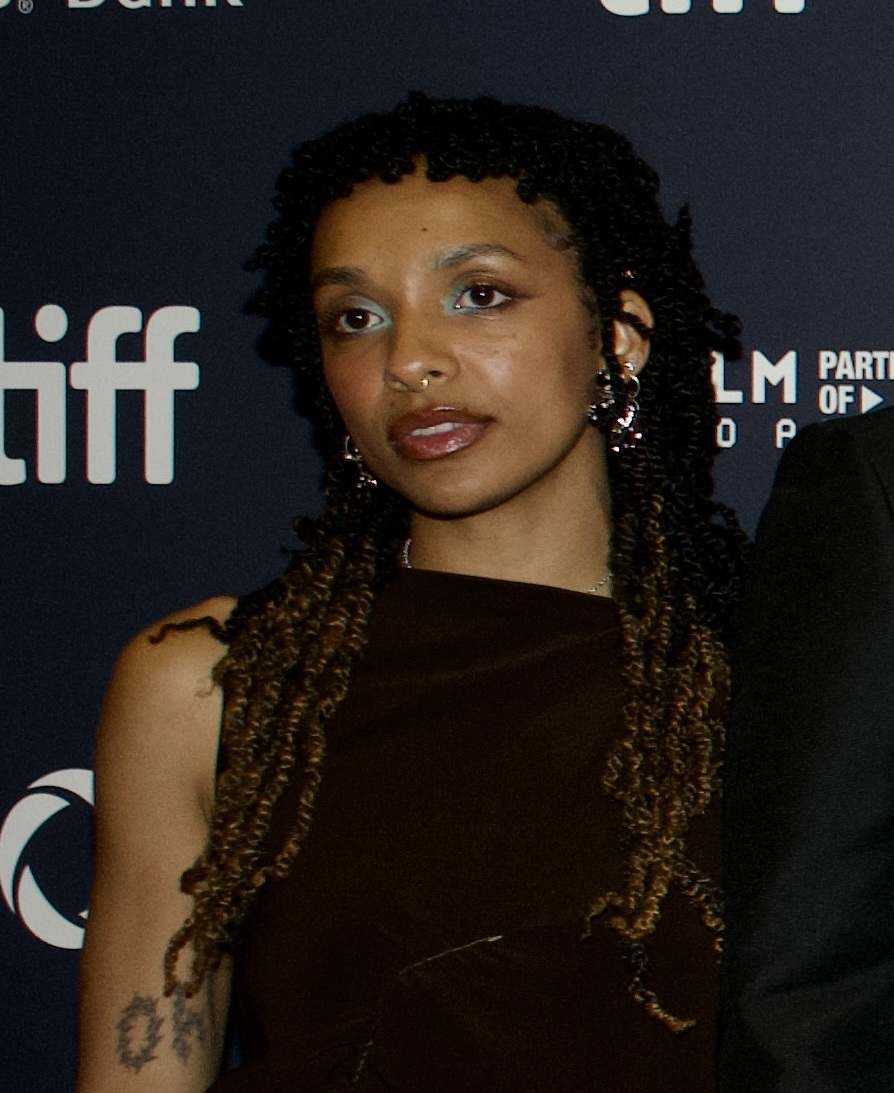
- Merlin at TIFF in 2025

Background information
- Born: 1996 or 1997 (age 29–30)
- Origin: Montreal, Quebec, Canada
- Genres: POP; R&B
- Occupations: Musician, actress
- Years active: 2020–present

Magi Merlin (born 1996 or 1997) is a Canadian musician and actress.

== Life and career ==
Magi Merlin is from Saint-Lazare, Quebec, but is based in Montreal. She is queer.

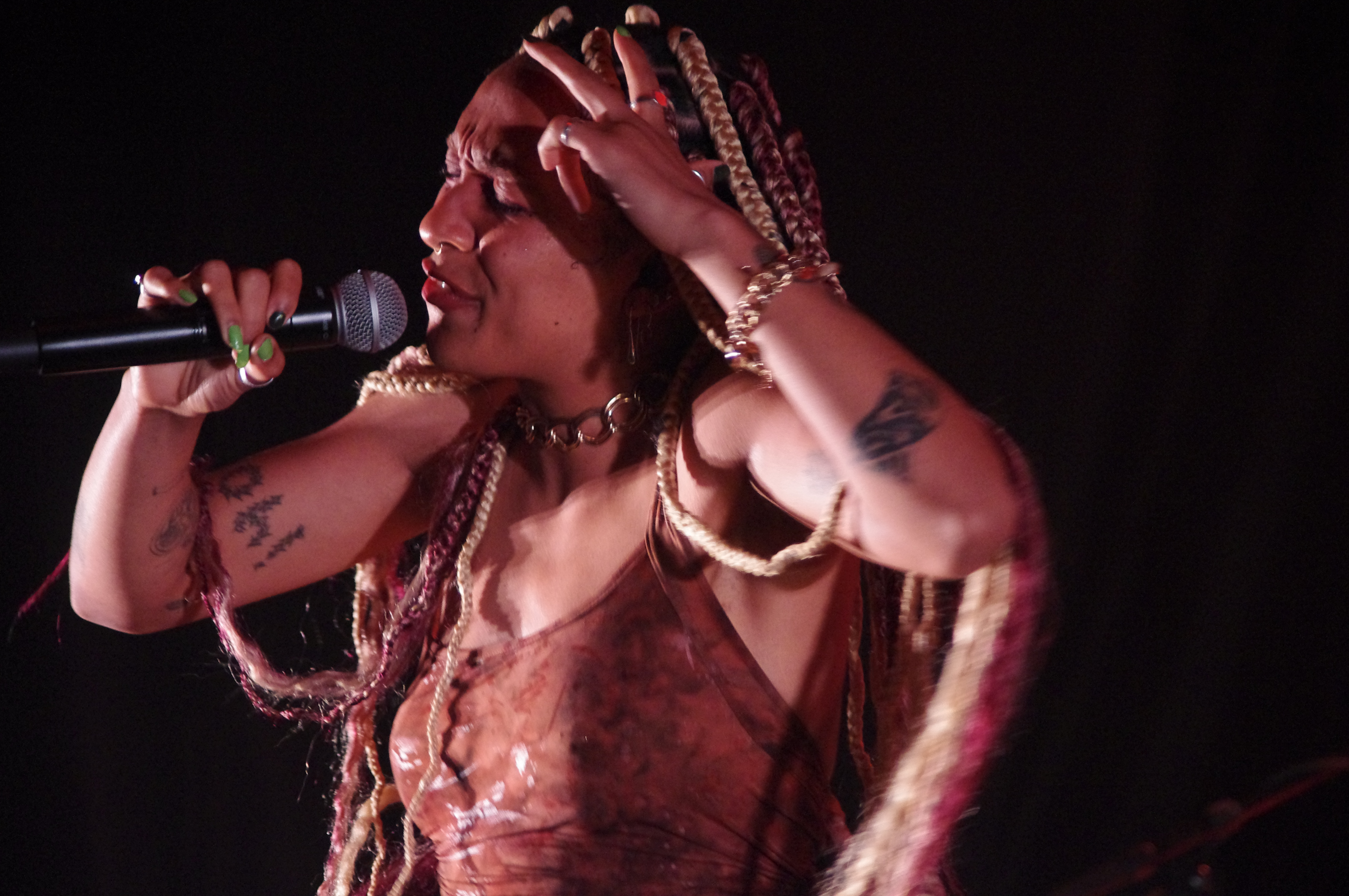
Merlin performing in 2022

In 2026, Merlin began releasing singles from her debut album, starting with "POPSTAR", and followed by "SpiceKick" and "So Smart". Her debut album Power House (stylized in all caps) released on July 10, 2026, on ONErpm & Bonsound.

Merlin appeared as Chloe in the 2025 film Mile End Kicks.

== Discography ==
Albums

- Power House (2026)

EPs

- A Weird Little Dog (2025)
- Gone Girl (2022)
- Drug Music (2021)
- On My Way to the Listening Party (2019)
