= It Happened in L.A. =

- Theatrical release poster
- Directed by: Michelle Morgan
- Written by: Michelle Morgan
- Produced by: Ryland Aldrich; Alix Madigan; Jared Stern
- Starring: Michelle Morgan; Jorma Taccone; Dree Hemingway
- Cinematography: Nicholas Wiesnet
- Edited by: John-Michael Powell
- Music by: Anthony B. Willis
- Production companies: Hyperion Media Group; Storyboard Entertainment; Water's End Productions
- Distributed by: The Orchard
- Release dates: January 20, 2017 (Sundance Film Festival); November 3, 2017 (United States)
- Running time: 96 minutes
- Country: United States
- Language: English

It Happened in L.A. is a 2017 American comedy film written and directed by Michelle Morgan. The film stars Morgan, Jorma Taccone and Dree Hemingway. The film had its world premiere at the Sundance Film Festival on January 20, 2017. The film was released on November 3, 2017, by The Orchard.

== Cast ==
- Michelle Morgan as Annette
- Jorma Taccone as Elliot
- Dree Hemingway as Baker
- Kentucker Audley as Peter
- Margarita Levieva as Ingrid
- Adam Shapiro as Jimmy
- Angela Trimbur as Simone
- Robert Schwartzman as Ben
- Nora Zehetner as Nora
- Tate Donovan as Tom
- Andre Hyland as Zee
- James Ransone as Heath
- Antonio Cupo as Michael
- Julie Mintz as Alice
- Flula Borg as Meep
- Allison Lanier as Megan

== Release ==
The film premiered at the 2017 Sundance Film Festival on January 20, 2017. In October 2017, The Orchard acquired U.S. distribution rights to the film, and set it for a November 3, 2017, release.

=== Critical response ===
On review aggregator website Rotten Tomatoes, the film has an approval rating of 69% based on 16 reviews, with a weighted average of 6/10. On Metacritic, the film holds a weighted average score of 58 out of 100, based on 11 critics, indicating "mixed or average" reviews.
