= Strawberry Guy =

Welsh indie pop musician

- Born: Alexander Morgan Stephens; 9 May 1996 (age 30); Caernarfon, Wales
- Origin: Liverpool, England
- Genres: Indie pop; bedroom pop; dream pop; psychedelic pop
- Occupations: Singer; songwriter; keyboardist
- Years active: 2018–present
- Label: Melodic
- Formerly of: The Orielles

Alexander Morgan Stephens (born 9 May 1996), better known by his stage name Strawberry Guy, is a Welsh indie pop musician. He is best known for his 2019 single "Mrs Magic", which gained popularity via TikTok.

Previously the keyboardist for the English indie rock band the Orielles, Stephens began creating music as Strawberry Guy in 2018 and released his debut EP, Taking My Time to Be, in 2019. He issued his first full-length album, Sun Outside My Window, in October 2021.

== Personal life ==
Stephens was born in Wales and relocated to Liverpool to attend the Liverpool Institute for Performing Arts.

== Discography ==
=== Studio albums ===
- Sun Outside My Window (2021)
- Give Me a Dream (2026)

=== EPs ===
- Taking My Time to Be (2019)
- F Song and Mrs Magic (Strings Versions) (2023)

=== Singles ===
List of singles, with selected chart positions
Title	Year	Peak chart positions	Certifications	Album
Title	Year	US	Certifications	Album
"F Song"	2018	—		Non-album single
"Without You"	2019	—		Taking My Time to Be
"What Would I Do?"	2019	—		Taking My Time to Be
"Mrs Magic"	2019	97 (Note: "Mrs Magic" did not chart on the Billboard Hot 100 until February 2026.)	RMNZ: Platinum; RIAA: Platinum	Taking My Time to Be
"Sun Outside My Window"	2021	—		Sun Outside My Window
"Company"	2021	—		Sun Outside My Window
"I'll Never Feel That Young Again"	2026	—		Give Me a Dream
"Love Me Like You Used To"	2026	—		Give Me a Dream
"—" denotes a recording that did not chart or was not released in that territory.
