= Mrs Magic =

2019 song by Strawberry Guy

Single by Strawberry Guy

from the album There I Go
- Released: July 23, 2019
- Genre: Psychedelic pop
- Length: 3:28
- Label: Melodic
- Songwriter: Alexander Stephens
- Producer: Stephens

Strawberry Guy singles chronology
"What Would I Do?" (2019)	"Mrs Magic" (2019)	"Sun Outside My Window" (2019)

"Mrs Magic" is a single by Welsh indie pop musician Strawberry Guy, released on July 23, 2019. It became a sleeper hit after gaining widespread traction on the video-sharing app TikTok in 2021. The song later entered the Billboard Hot 100, peaking at number 97 in February 2026, nearly seven years after its original release.

== Background ==
Strawberry Guy stated that the song was inspired by his first experience with magic mushrooms, which happened about a year prior and terrified him, contrary to his positive expectations. In particular, he felt like he had forgotten who or where he was, what he is doing, or how to act. The lyrics in the chorus refer to this feeling.

== Composition ==
"Mrs Magic" is a psychedelic pop song. Robin Murray of Clash described it as "Gloopy pop music with an analogue fixation" and reminiscent of Sir Was' early music. It consists of synths, orchestral instruments and pop hooks, with the sound conveying a sense of uncertainty in new beginnings.

== Promotion ==
In late 2021, the song became a viral sensation on TikTok, where it was used in over 70,000 videos. By then, it had also garnered over 50 million streams on Spotify. Strawberry Guy attributed its surge in popularity to the COVID-19 lockdowns, believing people had the urge to listen to music that was calm or would make them feel better.

== Strings version ==
On October 4, 2023, Strawberry Guy released a strings version of the song. He recorded it that same year at Real World Studios.

== Charts ==
Chart performance for "Mrs Magic"
Chart (2026)	Peak position
US Billboard Hot 100	97

== Certifications ==
Region	Certification	Certified units/sales
New Zealand (RMNZ)	Platinum	30,000^{‡}
United States (RIAA)	Platinum	1,000,000^{‡}
^{‡} Sales+streaming figures based on certification alone.
