= Pico Alexander =

American actor (born 1991)

- Born: Alexander Lukasz Jogalla; June 3, 1991 (age 35); New York City, U.S.
- Education: Rutgers University (BFA)
- Occupation: Actor
- Years active: 2009–present
- Father: Lukasz Jogalla
- Relatives: Janusz Gąsiorowski, Polish Army brigadier general, Jerzy Turowicz Catholic writer, (great-grandfathers)

Alexander Lukasz Jogalla (born June 3, 1991), known professionally as Pico Alexander, is an American actor.

== Early life and education ==
Alexander Lukasz Jogalla was born in New York City and raised in Park Slope, Brooklyn. His parents, Magdalena Deskur and cinematographer Lukasz Jogalla, are Polish immigrants from Kraków. His grandfather was actor Jerzy Jogałła, and his great-grandfather was journalist Jerzy Turowicz. He has a younger sister named Klara.

He graduated from Fiorello H. LaGuardia High School and earned a BFA in acting at Rutgers University. His stage name, "Pico", is a childhood nickname.

== Career ==
Alexander's stage credits include Our Town, Punk Rock, and What I Did Last Summer.

He has appeared on a number of television series, including The Carrie Diaries, Alpha House, The Following, Blue Bloods, and Orange Is the New Black.

He played Elias Morales, the brother of the lead character, in A Most Violent Year (2014), and Sonny Cottler, a Jewish fraternity president, in James Schamus's Indignation (2016), opposite Logan Lerman. In 2017, he played Trey Wandella in the Netflix Original War Machine and starred as Harry, Reese Witherspoon's character's love interest, in the romantic comedy film Home Again.

In 2018, he was featured in Rockstar Games' Red Dead Redemption 2, playing Kieran Duffy, a captured member of a rival gang.

== Filmography ==
=== Film ===
Year	Title	Role	Notes
2009	Turban	Jonathan	Short
2010	Get Set GO!	He	Short
2014	For the Record	Tom	Short
2014	A Most Violent Year	Elias Morales	
2015	Fan Girl	Charlie	TV movie
2016	Indignation	Sonny Cottler	
2017	War Machine	Trey Wandella	
2017	Home Again	Harry	
2018	The Portuguese Kid	Freddie Imbrossi	
2018	Summer Days, Summer Nights	JJ Flynn	
2018	Hot Air	Grayson	
2021	Superior	Robert	
2022	The Sky Is Everywhere	Toby Shaw	
2022	The Honeymoon	Adam	
2025	The Family McMullen	Thomas "Tommy" McMullen	

=== Television ===
Year	Title	Role	Notes
2014	The Carrie Diaries	Nick	Episode: "Under Pressure"
2014	Alpha House	Reuben	Episode: "Showgirls"
2014	Unforgettable	Mean Guy #1	Episode: "Reunion"
2014	The Following	Young Joe	Episode: "Teacher's Pet"
2014	Blue Bloods	Darren Bentley	Episode: "Power of the Press"
2015	Orange Is the New Black	Ian	Episode: "Fake It Till You Fake It Some More"
2019	Catch-22	Clevinger	Recurring Cast
2021	Dickinson	Henry 'Ship' Shipley	Recurring Cast: Season 2
2022	Gossip Girl	Mike Shubin	Recurring Cast: Season 2
2023	Saint X	Josh	Recurring Cast

=== Video games ===
Year	Title	Voice role
2018	Red Dead Redemption 2	Kieran Duffy
2025	Goodnight Universe	Milo
