= Juliette Gariépy =

Canadian actress and model

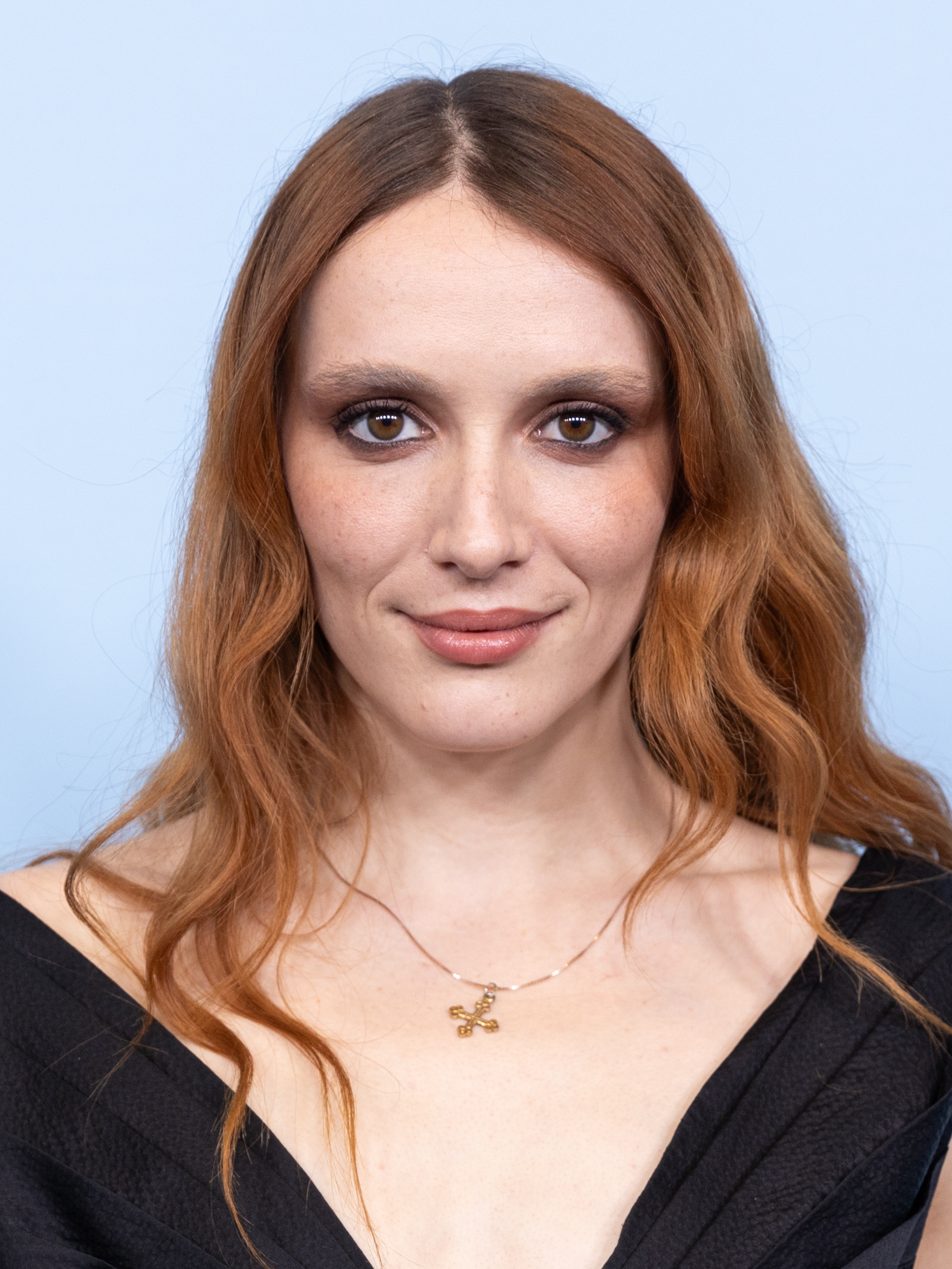
- Gariépy in 2025
- Occupations: Actress; model
- Years active: 2014–present

Juliette Gariépy is a Canadian actress and model from Quebec.

For her performance in the widely acclaimed independent film Red Rooms, she won the Prix Iris for Revelation of the Year at the 25th Quebec Cinema Awards in 2023, she was co-winner with Nathan Stewart-Jarrett of the award for Best Performance at the 27th Fantasia International Film Festival, and she was nominated for a Canadian Screen Award for Best Lead Performance in a Drama Film at the 12th Canadian Screen Awards in 2024.

Gariépy has also played roles in the films Boost, You Can Live Forever, Inès, Mothers and Monsters, Two Women, Mile End Kicks and Skinny Boots.

== Filmography ==
=== Film ===
Year	Title	Role	Notes
2016	Boost	Maxine	
2021	Inès	Girl in trashy bar	
2022	You Can Live Forever	Angella	
2023	Red Rooms	Kelly-Anne	
2025	Two Women	Eli	
2025	Mile End Kicks	Madeleine	
2026	Skinny Boots		Short film

=== Television ===
Year	Title	Role	Notes
2014	Trauma	Teenager on a moped	Episode: "Rires et larmes"
2016	District 31	Julie Meloche	Episode: "L'affaire Julie Meloche"
2018	Fugueuse	Girl from the center	Episode: "En manque"
2018	Les Simone	Chanelle Lavergne	2 episodes
2024	Distinct Society	Valérie	4 episodes
2026	Je Te Tiens	Macha	Main role
