= I Like Movies =

2022 film directed by Chandler Levack

- Theatrical release poster
- Directed by: Chandler Levack
- Written by: Chandler Levack
- Produced by: Lindsay Blair Goeldner; Evan Dubinsky; Chandler Levack
- Starring: Isaiah Lehtinen; Romina D'Ugo; Krista Bridges; Percy Hynes White
- Cinematography: Rico Moran
- Edited by: Simone Smith
- Music by: Murray A. Lightburn
- Production company: VHS Forever
- Distributed by: Mongrel Media
- Release dates: September 9, 2022 (TIFF); March 10, 2023 (Canada)
- Running time: 99 minutes
- Country: Canada
- Language: English
- Budget: $130,000

I Like Movies is a 2022 Canadian comedy-drama film written and directed by Chandler Levack. Set in the early 2000s, the film stars Isaiah Lehtinen as Lawrence, a socially inept 17-year-old cinephile who gets a job at a video store, where he forms a complicated friendship with his older female manager.

The film is produced by Lindsay Blair Goeldner with original score by Murray Lightburn from the Dears. Its cast also includes Romina D'Ugo, Krista Bridges, Percy Hynes White, Dan Beirne, Andy McQueen, Rodrigo Fernandez-Stoll, and Alex Ateah.

Levack has described the film as being based in part on her own teenage job in a video store, although she has stated that she chose to write the central character as male out of a desire to push back against the popular notion that women filmmakers can only tell female-oriented stories. The project was first announced as receiving funding from Telefilm Canada's Talent to Watch program for emerging filmmakers in 2019, under the working title Rejects Night.

I Like Movies had its world premiere in the Discovery section of the Toronto International Film Festival on September 9, 2022. It was released theatrically in Canada on March 10, 2023, by Mongrel Media, and has been picked up for worldwide distribution by Visit Films. The film received generally positive reviews from critics.

== Plot ==
In 2003, Burlington, Ontario, egotistical Lawrence Kweller and his sociable best friend Matt Macarchuck present a short movie to their class about their weekly "Reject's Night" ritual of watching SNL skits. Classmate Lauren P. attempts to support the film, much to Lawrence's chagrin, and the class' reaction embarrasses Matt.

Lawrence is determined to be hired at Sequels, a movie rental store, to pay for tuition at NYU Tisch School of the Arts. He is eventually hired by peppy manager Alana, and explains to Matt that his shift conflicts with Reject's Night. After watching Punch-Drunk Love together, he and Matt clash over Lawrence's pretentious love for movies and arrogant belief that Matt is merely a 'placeholder' friend who will be discarded for film-oriented friends at NYU. Matt's developing romantic interest in Lauren causes a further rift in their relationship, and Lawrence is removed from their project, the end of year film, to be replaced by Lauren.

Lawrence confides in Alana, who shares that she dropped out of college after her roommate committed suicide. When he suffers a panic attack after reporting late for work, his mother Terri reveals to Alana that Lawrence's father took his own life as well. Alana guiltily tells Lawrence she previously lied, and that she instead dropped out to pursue an acting career in Los Angeles that was cut short after she was raped by a producer. She persuades him to apply to Carleton University as well.

Lawrence invites Matt to Reject's Night after learning that Lauren was accepted to a prestigious film program, but Matt abandons him. Lawrence learns Matt has deliberately switched Sequels locations to avoid seeing him. Upset, he insists on sleeping at Sequels overnight, despite the security risk it poses, and learns the next morning that he has been rejected from NYU and Sequels has been robbed after he forgot to set the security alarm code when he left the store. He is fired by an angry Alana, who tells him he is narcissistic.

After watching the end of year film, Lawrence praises Matt and Lauren. He apologizes to Matt and reconciles with Alana, who encourages him to talk less about himself and actively listen when conversing with others. The movie ends with Lawrence making friends with different interests at Carleton.

== Cast ==
- Isaiah Lehtinen as Lawrence Kweller
- Romina D'Ugo as Alana, Lawrence's boss
- Percy Hynes White as Matt Macarchuck
- Alex Ateah as Shannon
- Anand Rajaram as Mr Oleneck
- Rodrigo Fernandez-Stoll as yuppie man
- Dan Beirne as Owen from Sequels management
- Andy McQueen as Brendan, Lawrence's co-worker at Sequels
- Eden Cupid as Lauren Phillips
- Veronika Slowikowska as Tabitha
- Krista Bridges as Terri Kweller, Lawrence's mother
- Tanner Zipchen as video store hottie

== Production ==
Filmed in the Greater Toronto Area under COVID response mandates, the film achieved remarkable production values. The full interior set for the fictional Sequels video store was fitted with props (DVDs, shelving, computers, etc.) obtained from an actual Blockbuster Video store in Owen Sound, Ontario (vacant for 10 years). Levack said the film cost about $130,000 to make.

== Critical response ==
On the review aggregator website Rotten Tomatoes, 98% of 42 critics' reviews are positive. The website's consensus reads: "A scrappy coming of age dramedy that pulls off a surprisingly moving tonal sleight of hand (...) is fiercely unsentimental about cinema nostalgia and all the better for it." Metacritic, which uses a weighted average, assigned the film a score of 76 out of 100, based on 8 critics, indicating "generally favorable" reviews.

Rachel Ho of That Shelf praised Lehtinen's performance in the lead role, and wrote, "While based loosely on her own life, Levack's gender swap proves to be a fascinating element of the film." For Cult MTL, Alex Rose wrote that "Though obviously borrowing from retail-work staples of the video store era like Clerks, Empire Records or High Fidelity."

The film was named to TIFF's annual year-end Canada's Top Ten list for 2022.

In 2023, Barry Hertz of The Globe and Mail named the film as one of the 23 best Canadian comedy films ever made.

== Awards ==
At the 2022 Calgary International Film Festival, the film won the $10,000 RBC Emerging Artist Award.

The film won four awards at the Vancouver Film Critics Circle Awards 2022, for Best Canadian Film, Best Actor in a Canadian Film (Lehtinen), Supporting Actor in a Canadian Film (Hynes White) and Best Screenplay for a Canadian Film (Levack).

Simone Smith won the Canadian Screen Award for Best Editing at the 11th Canadian Screen Awards in 2023.
