= The Hunt (The Wire) =

- The Wire episode
- Episode no.: Season 1 Episode 11
- Directed by: Steve Shill
- Story by: David Simon; Ed Burns
- Teleplay by: Joy Lusco
- Original air date: August 18, 2002
- Running time: 56 minutes

Episode chronology
← Previous "The Cost"	Next → "Cleaning Up"

"The Hunt" is the 11th episode of the first season of the HBO original series The Wire. The episode was written by Joy Lusco from a story by David Simon and Ed Burns and was directed by Steve Shill. It originally aired on August 18, 2002.

== Plot summary ==
Rawls and Landsman go to the scene where Greggs and Orlando have been shot. Bunk finds Greggs' weapon and some footprints and clothes belonging to the gunmen. Rawls finds McNulty in a state of shock. Freamon marshals the detail to get back to working the wiretap so any discussion of the shooting can be used as evidence. Carver informs Greggs' family and her girlfriend, Cheryl, about the shooting. At the hospital, Rawls uncharacteristically tells McNulty that Greggs' shooting is in no way McNulty's responsibility. Cheryl and Carver arrive, and Burrell misunderstands Cheryl's relationship with Greggs. Burrell asks Commissioner Warren Frazier if he wants to talk to Cheryl, but Frazier declines and leaves Burrell to go alone, disappointing Carver. Cheryl returns home and breaks down in tears.

The next day, Stringer orders Wee-Bey to murder Little Man for supposedly killing Greggs. In the Pit, D'Angelo discusses the shooting with Poot and Bodie, mistakenly believing that the shooting was unrelated to their organization. Observing from a nearby church roof, Santangelo and Herc watch Bodie receiving a resupply of drugs from the towers. Herc notes the window which the stash is being dropped from. Wallace telephones Poot from his grandmother's house but is simply homesick and has little to say. Bodie notices that Savino is the target of a manhunt and Little Man has disappeared, realizing that the shooting is tied to them. Bodie theorizes that someone has made mistakes and Avon will order his death. At Orlando's, Stringer orders D'Angelo to go with Wee-Bey. Neither Stringer nor Wee-Bey will tell him where they are going, leading D'Angelo to assume he will be killed. However, it turns out D'Angelo has been assigned to drive Wee-Bey to Philadelphia. Wallace phones Poot to ask for money to come home.

As warrants are served on Savino, Freamon and Prez find a page made to Stringer from a payphone near the scene of the shooting. Freamon has crime scene technicians dust the payphone and a nearby discarded drink can for fingerprints. McNulty shows up drunk to work, leading to a confrontation with Daniels. At Homicide, Bunk and Landsman suspect that the shooting was either a stick-up or a setup by the Barksdales. Freamon arrives to confirm that the fingerprints match Little Man. Bubbles, unaware of the shooting, is picked up by two uniformed officers after trying to page Greggs. A confused Bubbles is interrogated by Holley, who begins to beat him and has to be restrained by Landsman. McNulty returns Bubbles to Barksdale territory and gives him money to buy drugs, not realizing that he is trying to stay clean. Bubbles realizes that Wee-Bey and Little Man are the likely shooters and reports to McNulty, who relays the information to Bunk. Bubbles again tries to tell McNulty that he is clean but is cut off when McNulty has to leave. He is left holding the money that McNulty gave him.

McNulty threatens to investigate Levy's finances if he does not produce Savino. Pearlman chastises him, noting that Levy is a powerful figure in the Baltimore legal community. McNulty makes a remark about State's Attorneys that causes Pearlman to say that he will use anyone. Levy brings in Savino and claims that he had planned to defraud Orlando and was not involved in the shooting. Burrell tells Rawls, Foerster and Daniels to organize citywide drug raids. Daniels tells his men that they will offer the cutting house Herc discovered but will not tell them about the stash house they have uncovered, in order to protect the wire. However, Major Bobby Reed confronts Daniels about withholding targets, making him realize they have a mole in the detail. McNulty approaches Phelan at a political fundraiser and fails to convince him to help with Burrell, as the judge has been reinstated on the mayor's ticket. Raids are made against the stash house, Savino's home and the towers. Carver and Herc again find themselves alone while picking up piles of cash, and this time, silently pocket some of it. Vast quantities of guns, narcotics and money are seized. At the detail, work has all but ceased. Prez monitors light phone traffic (notably, missing Wallace's call to Poot) while Greggs remains on life support.

== Production ==
=== Title reference ===
The title refers to the knee-jerk police effort to identify the shooter(s) of Detective Greggs and the beginnings of a hunt for a rat in the detail.

=== Epigraph ===
Dope on the damn table.

— Daniels

The epigraph refers to the commissioner's desire to seize drug dealers' assets in response to the shooting of a police officer, irrespective of how it will affect larger cases. The episode picture shows the results of this desire - a press conference with plenty of seized drugs to show off in a photo-op. It also serves as a scathing criticism of the progress of the war on drugs.

=== Music ===
Masta Ace feat. Strick - Unfriendly Game (during the car ride with D'Angelo and Wee-Bey)

During the scene showing Cheryl's grief over Greggs' grave injury, Nina Simone's "Sugar in My Bowl" is playing.

=== Credits ===
==== Guest stars ====
- Peter Gerety as Judge Daniel Phelan
- Seth Gilliam as Detective Ellis Carver
- Domenick Lombardozzi as Detective Thomas "Herc" Hauk
- Clarke Peters as Detective Lester Freamon
- Jim True-Frost as Detective Roland "Prez" Pryzbylewski
- Hassan Johnson as Roland "Wee-Bey" Brice
- Corey Parker Robinson as Detective Leander Sydnor
- Michael B. Jordan as Wallace
- J. D. Williams as Preston "Boadie" Broadus
- Tray Chaney as Malik "Poot" Carr
- Richard De Angelis as Major Raymond Foerster
- Michael Salconi as Detective Michael Santangelo
- Michael Kostroff as Maurice Levy
- Melanie Nicholls-King as Cheryl
- Delaney Williams as Sergeant Jay Landsman
- Chris Clanton as Savino
- Micaiah Jones as Little Man
- Curtis Montez as Sterling
- Tony D. Head as Major Bobby Reed
- Clayton LeBouef as Wendell "Orlando" Blocker
- Edward Norris as Detective Ed Norris
- Dick Stilwell as Commissioner Warren Frazier
- Katana Lazet Hall as Savino's mother
- Susan Rome as Assistant State's Attorney Ilene Nathan
- Brian Anthony Wilson as Detective Vernon Holley
- Christopher Glenn Wilson as DEA Agent

== Reception ==
In a 2009 retrospective of The Wire season one for The Guardian, Paul Owen analyzed this episode as exposing McNulty's "unsympathetic characteristics" that disqualify him from being a protagonist. Owen praised the scene where Cheryl cries after seeing the highlighter mark that Greggs left on her sofa as "a lovely, subtle moment" but criticized "the confusing segment where D'Angelo, the inexperienced and conflicted young dealer, thinks Stringer has ordered his enforcer Wee-Bey to murder him."

== Legacy ==
A scene where Wee-Bey reacted to the shooting of Greggs became a popular online GIF many years after this episode was broadcast.

The scene where Wee-Bey shows a surprised expression after learning that shooting victim Greggs was a police officer resurfaced as a reaction GIF over 15 years after this episode was originally aired.

Hassan Johnson, the actor who played Wee-Bey, commented about the popularity of that GIF in 2022: "It doesn’t get old. I guess I have an out-of-body experience to be able to see that and understand that."
