= Sentencing (The Wire) =

- The Wire episode
- Episode no.: Season 1 Episode 13
- Directed by: Tim Van Patten
- Written by: David Simon; Ed Burns
- Original air date: September 8, 2002
- Running time: 65 minutes

Episode chronology
← Previous "Cleaning Up"	Next → "Ebb Tide"

"Sentencing" is the 13th episode and finale of the first season of the HBO original series The Wire. The episode was written by David Simon and Ed Burns and was directed by Tim Van Patten. It originally aired on September 8, 2002.

== Plot summary ==
Greggs awakens in her hospital bed to find Bunk and Cole waiting to ask for her help identifying her shooters. Bunk shows her photo arrays and she is able to pick out Little Man, but not Wee-Bey. Herc reports that he has found all of the Barksdale dealers whom he had warrants for, apart from Wee-Bey. Daniels worries that their case will be shut down unless they can provide new leads. McNulty suggests going behind their superiors' backs to take the case federal. The detail becomes aware of the rift between D'Angelo and his family and moves to interview him.

Avon, Stringer and Levy conclude from the high number of arrests that they must have been subjected to a wiretap. Stringer suggests bailing out many of their people to avoid making enemies, while Levy is in favor of a structured plea where they give up their own people to avoid sentencing. As they relocate to their funeral parlor, Stringer convinces Avon to take a step back while Stringer handles the product and Brianna handles the money. Avon agrees but insists that Roberto, the Barksdales' Dominican supplier in New York, up the quality of the product, while Brianna will bring D'Angelo around by passing on a message that he will make it all up to him.

Under questioning by McNulty and Pearlman, D'Angelo admits his involvement in Brandon's murder and gives up Wee-Bey's location in Philadelphia. When confronted with the murder of Deirdre Kresson, contrary to the tale which he told to his subordinates, D'Angelo paints Wee-Bey as the shooter. D'Angelo laments about how suffocating "the game" can be and that he felt more liberated in jail than he ever was on the street. He expresses a desire to start over and promises that if the court can relocate him somewhere where the game cannot touch him, he will give them everything on the Barksdale Organization.

Daniels excitedly tells the news to Marla, who hopes that this will square things with Burrell. Daniels tells her of his plans to go around Burrell and reach out to the FBI. In Philadelphia, Bunk and Freamon track down Wee-Bey by tracing numbers that have called Levy's office from the city. Stringer receives a new package of narcotics and instructs one of his few remaining lieutenants on how to prepare the drugs and spread the word that their business is again open. McNulty convinces Fitz to consider bringing in the FBI, but his supervisor declines. Daniels decides to take the case to the U.S. attorney because of the political corruption involved.

Turf clashes break out in the Pit, with Bodie holding the ground for the Barksdales. McNulty finally visits Greggs' bedside, who eases his guilt and asks him to take care of Bubbles. Cheryl storms out of the room when they talk about the case, as she does not believe any of it is worth Greggs' life or safety. McNulty delivers Greggs' money to Bubbles to help in his fresh start but finds that he is using again. Bubbles tries to return some of the money but cannot resist taking it all. He asks McNulty not to tell Greggs. Later, Herc is notified that he is no longer in line for a promotion to sergeant and that Carver has been moved up the list.

McNulty, Daniels and Freamon meet with the FBI and the U.S. Attorney, explaining that the Barksdales have been buying and exorbitantly reselling property in areas set for redevelopment with help from corrupt politicians. The FBI expresses a desire to use the dealers to target the politicians, which causes McNulty to accuse the FBI of ignoring the misery in West Baltimore. Daniels later confronts Carver, who is revealed as being Burrell's mole in the detail. Afterward, Daniels returns Prez to street duty and arrests Wee-Bey in Philadelphia. Meanwhile, Brianna visits D'Angelo in prison and tries to appeal to his sense of family loyalty.

Rawls reveals to McNulty that the U.S. Attorney phoned Burrell to complain about McNulty's behavior, tipping Burrell to the fact that the detail had tried to take the case federal. Pearlman discovers D'Angelo is now being represented by Levy, who tells them that the dealers will plead guilty in exchange for fixed sentences. At the court hearing, Pearlman presents Avon's guilty plea in exchange for a sentence of seven years. Stringer and Brianna are in the court as spectators, as is McNulty, who cannot bring himself to stay. Outside, Stringer congratulates McNulty, repeating the phrase that McNulty had muttered to Stringer after D'Angelo's exoneration in the first episode: "Nicely done." Phelan also congratulates McNulty, who is despondent and refuses to acknowledge him. McNulty returns to the courtroom as D'Angelo is sentenced to twenty years, the maximum sentence.

Daniels bumps into Cantrell, now a major, having received the promotion for which Daniels had been in line. Back at the Narcotics division, Herc holds an induction for two new detectives. Daniels is amused that his attitude has changed and that he now hopes to make big cases using intelligent investigative techniques. Rawls allows Freamon to return to Homicide. Bodie organizes trade in the towers, while Poot oversees the Pit. Meanwhile, Bunk confronts Wee-Bey about multiple murders; Wee-Bey refuses to give up Avon and Stringer, but admits to killing Little Man, Nakeesha Lyles and William Gant; Bunk and McNulty agree that Wee-Bey's confession concerning Gant is false.

The season ends with a montage showing: Bubbles and Johnny back on the hustle and Santangelo on patrol in West Baltimore; Burrell promoting Carver; Prez clearing the detail's string board; Greggs gazing wistfully at a car chase from her hospital window; Freamon and Bunk delivering a bottle of whiskey to McNulty at his new post with the marine unit; Stringer overseeing the counting of his profits at the funeral parlor; replacement dealers and hoppers, showing the futility of fighting the drug trade; and the prolific drug trade throughout the whole of Baltimore. Finally, Omar is seen in the South Bronx holding up another dealer and telling him that it is "all in the game."

== Production ==
=== Title reference ===
The title refers to the sentencing of the Barksdale crew members arrested, as well as to the fates of the officers from the detail.

=== Epigraph ===
All in the game.

— Traditional West Baltimore

This is a comment made by Omar while holding up a drug dealer and is the final line of the episode.

=== Music ===
The song that plays in the background in the scene where Poot talks to a dealer at the Pit is "Always on Time" by Ja Rule. The song over the closing montage is "Step by Step" by Jesse Winchester.

=== Credits ===
==== Guest stars ====
1. Peter Gerety as Judge Daniel Phelan
2. Seth Gilliam as Detective Ellis Carver
3. Domenick Lombardozzi as Detective Thomas "Herc" Hauk
4. Leo Fitzpatrick as Johnny Weeks
5. J. D. Williams as Preston "Bodie" Broadus
6. Clarke Peters as Detective Lester Freamon
7. Jim True-Frost as Detective Roland "Prez" Pryzbylewski
8. Hassan Johnson as Roland "Wee-Bey" Brice
9. Michael K. Williams as Omar Little
10. Tray Chaney as Malik "Poot" Carr
11. Wendy Grantham as Shardene Innes
12. Michael B. Jordan as Wallace
13. Delaney Williams as Sergeant Jay Landsman
14. Maria Broom as Marla Daniels
15. Michael Kostroff as Maurice Levy
16. Melanie Nicholls-King as Cheryl
17. Michael Salconi as Officer Michael Santangelo
18. Jarvis George as Ronnie Mo
19. Michael Hyatt as Brianna Barksdale
20. Curtis Montez as Sterling
21. Edward Norris as Detective Ed Norris
22. Benay Berger as FBI Supervisor Amanda Reese
23. Doug Olear as FBI Special Agent Terrance "Fitz" Fitzhugh
24. Susan Rome as Assistant State's Attorney Ilene Nathan
25. Stephen F. Schmidt as Wee-Bey's attorney

==== Writing ====
This is the only episode of The Wire to use the "written by" credit: all other episodes use the teleplay and story credits.

== Reception ==
When previewing the episode, Eric Deggans of the St. Petersburg Times called it the conclusion to one of the "freshest, most innovative, most entertaining series" of the summer. They predicted low ratings based on the show's defiance of what experts thought viewers were looking for – the episode relies heavily on viewers having seen the rest of the series due to the heavily serialized nature of the show. The article states that the show's deliberate pace leads to a satisfying pay-off. The article praised the starring cast including Dominic West (Jimmy McNulty), Sonja Sohn (Kima Greggs), Wood Harris (Avon Barksdale) and Larry Gilliard Jr (D'Angelo Barksdale). For The Baltimore Sun, David Zurawik concluded: "The Wire does not offer a simplistic moral vision. Just an honest one - one of the most honest on American television."

The Futon Critic named it the best episode of 2002, saying the "season finale was one of those episodes where afterward you shut the television off and sit there for a few minutes stunned by what you just watched" and that it is "By far and away the best new series of 2002, David Simon's drama literally reinvented how a cop series could be done in the same way Stephen Bocho [sic] did a decade ago with NYPD Blue ... About as good as television can possibly get."

Reviewers have commented that the show's novelistic structure and non-cliffhanger conclusion of the storyline would make it difficult for a second season to satisfy the audience. Creators Simon and Ed Burns commented as early as the airing of the premiere of the pilot episode that they felt the show could continue by investigating a different set of criminals or a different kind of crime and retain some, but not all, of the starring cast.
