= The Cost (The Wire) =

- The Wire episode
- Episode no.: Season 1 Episode 10
- Directed by: Brad Anderson
- Story by: David Simon; Ed Burns
- Teleplay by: David Simon
- Original air date: August 11, 2002
- Running time: 55 minutes

Episode chronology
← Previous "Game Day"	Next → "The Hunt"

"The Cost" is the tenth episode of the first season of the HBO original series The Wire. The episode was written by David Simon from a story by David Simon and Ed Burns and was directed by Brad Anderson. It originally aired on August 11, 2002.

== Plot ==
After three days clean, Bubbles meets Walon, who supports his attempts at sobriety and recounts how he contracted HIV and unknowingly infected his girlfriend. Later, Greggs assists with finding Bubbles accommodation. Meanwhile, Avon and Stringer meet with Wee-Bey and instruct him to arrange a truce with Omar. Stringer persuades Avon to distance himself further from the drug operation, leading Avon to surrender his pager and require all communication to pass through Stringer.

McNulty visits Phelan, who has suddenly become reluctant to support the Barksdale investigation. Later, Pearlman informs McNulty that Phelan has been removed from the mayor's re-election ticket. Elsewhere, D'Angelo grows increasingly detached from his life, ignoring Donette's plans for their future and requests for money. He then attempts to reconnect with Shardene at Orlando's, but she refuses to speak to him. Freamon traces the Barksdale resupply network to a payphone in Pimlico; Carver and Sydnor go to monitor the location. Alongside Santangelo, they identify Little Man, a Barksdale soldier, using the phone and follow the chain to a suburban stash house. Freamon later organizes surveillance of the property using Sydnor and Prez disguised as garbage collectors.

Meanwhile, Orlando is arrested while attempting to buy cocaine from an undercover officer. To avoid serious charges, he gives up Avon's name. The Barksdales learn of the arrest through Marvin Browning, an incarcerated Barksdale associate. Levy cuts Orlando loose by removing him from the strip club's liquor license, severing his ties with Avon. Burrell orders a buy-bust operation using Orlando as an informant, despite Daniels wanting to wait before acting. McNulty locates Wallace squatting in the towers and bribes uniformed officers to help apprehend him. Wallace, who is in withdrawal, identifies Stringer, Wee-Bey and others involved in Brandon's murder. Because protective custody funds are unavailable, Daniels relocates Wallace to his grandmother's home on the Eastern Shore. Meanwhile, McNulty faces an emergency custody hearing initiated by Elena, who confronts him about his relationship with Pearlman. Elsewhere, Greggs shares the story of her first arrest with Cheryl, helping ease tensions in their relationship.

Omar meets Stringer under Proposition Joe's supervision to discuss a truce. Although Omar wears a wire, little useful evidence is gathered. Suspecting a trap by Stringer, Omar rejects the deal and leaves Baltimore for New York City. The police proceed with the buy-bust with Greggs going undercover as Orlando’s girlfriend, but the operation collapses when armed Barksdale enforcers ambush the vehicle. Orlando is killed, and Greggs is shot twice, suffering serious injuries.

== Production ==
=== Title reference ===
The title refers to the injury to Greggs, the cost of the investigation. Also, it refers to the cost of Bubbles's newfound sobriety, as well as the cost of what he could lose (a home with his estranged sister).

=== Epigraph ===
And then he dropped the bracelets...

— Greggs

Greggs uses the quotation when describing her experience of a difficult physical arrest where she received nonchalant backup and realized she was meant to be a police officer.

=== Music ===
The song playing in the car with Orlando and Greggs is "Hater Players" by Black Star. The song playing when D'Angelo accosts Shardene outside Orlando's is "I'll Go Crazy" by James Brown from the album Live at the Apollo. The song playing while Shardene tries to listen in on Wee-Bey, Avon, and Stringer is Ms. Fat Booty by Black Star-member Mos Def.

=== Non-fiction elements ===
In his meeting with Omar, Stringer uses the phrase "truth be told" which is also the title of the guide book on the series.

When Omar leaves at the bus station and says goodbye to McNulty, he is asked about New York City. He replies 'There must be something happening, it's too big a town', a line lifted from the Steve Earle song 'New York City'

=== Credits ===
==== Guest stars ====
- Peter Gerety as Judge Daniel Phelan
- Callie Thorne as Elena McNulty
- Seth Gilliam as Detective Ellis Carver
- Domenick Lombardozzi as Detective Thomas "Herc" Hauk
- Clarke Peters as Detective Lester Freamon
- Jim True-Frost as Detective Roland "Prez" Pryzbylewski
- Hassan Johnson as Roland "Wee-Bey" Brice
- Neko Parham as State Police Undercover Troy Wiggins
- Corey Parker Robinson as Detective Leander Sydnor
- Steve Earle as Walon
- Michael B. Jordan as Wallace
- Michael K. Williams as Omar Little
- Wendy Grantham as Shardene Innes
- Clayton LeBouef as Wendell "Orlando" Blocker
- Melanie Nicholls-King as Cheryl
- Michael Salconi as Detective Michael Santangelo
- Chris Clanton as Savino
- Richard De Angelis as Major Raymond Foerster
- Michael Kostroff as Maurice Levy
- Delaney Williams as Sergeant Jay Landsman
- Shamyl Brown as Donette
- Robert F. Chew as Proposition Joe
- Ed Norris as Detective Ed Norris
- Jeorge Watson as Marvin Browning
- Barry Bradford as Barksdale stash house man
- Micaiah Jones as Little Man
- Isiah Whitlock, Jr. as Senator Clay Davis
- Christopher Glenn Wilson as DEA Agent
