= Cleaning Up (The Wire) =

- The Wire episode
- Episode no.: Season 1 Episode 12
- Directed by: Clement Virgo
- Story by: David Simon; Ed Burns
- Teleplay by: George Pelecanos
- Original air date: September 1, 2002
- Running time: 56 minutes

Episode chronology
← Previous "The Hunt"	Next → "Sentencing"

"Cleaning Up" is the twelfth and penultimate episode of the first season of the HBO original series The Wire. The episode was written by George Pelecanos from a story by David Simon and Ed Burns and was directed by Clement Virgo. It originally aired on September 1, 2002.

== Plot summary ==
Stringer orders D'Angelo's crew to surrender their pagers and insists all business be conducted face-to-face to avoid police surveillance. Levy warns Avon and Stringer to distance themselves from Orlando's and eliminate any loose ends, including security guard Nakeesha Lyles, who may testify against D'Angelo. Stringer persuades Avon to insulate himself from the organization by communicating only through him. Meanwhile, Wallace returns to the Pit and is welcomed back by D'Angelo, despite Bodie's objections.

As Greggs recovers in the hospital, a guilt-ridden McNulty considers abandoning the case. Daniels reminds him that they owe it to Greggs to continue the investigation. Freamon realizes the Barksdale Organization has altered its methods to evade surveillance and begins exploring new leads, including campaign finance records, with Prez traveling to Annapolis to locate campaign contributions. Freamon uses Shardene as an informant; although she wears a wire inside Orlando's, she gathers little useful information.

Political pressure mounts on the detail; Burrell believes the investigation is effectively over now that the wiretaps have gone silent and orders Daniels to scale back. He orders the return of Santangelo and Sydnor to their previous positions, but lets Daniels retain Prez and Freamon. Daniels argues that time remains on the court order and he will continue pursuing the case until then. Pearlman receives evidence of suspicious campaign contributions, tying the investigation to political figures, including Senator Davis. She is distressed at the prospect of investigating her superiors and denies any knowledge of the detail when asked. Later, Davis angrily orders Burrell to control Daniels after finding out Daniels is looking into his campaign finances and his driver.

After Nakeesha is found murdered, Daniels fears for Wallace's safety and organizes a search for him. Meanwhile, Freamon helps Shardene map the interior of Avon's office, allowing the detail to install a hidden camera from a neighboring building. Stringer orders Bodie to kill Wallace. Though both Bodie and Poot struggle with the task, they both ultimately kill Wallace in his bedroom. Meanwhile, the detail witness Avon clear his office at Orlando's, frustrating their investigation.

Spying on his office, the detail learn that Avon will send D'Angelo to New York City to pick up a drug shipment. McNulty and Daniels plant a tracking device on his car borrowed from the FBI, eventually intercepting him. D’Angelo initially refuses to believe Wallace is dead when told by McNulty, but Stringer's evasiveness convinces him. Furious, he rejects Levy's representation and Avon is chastized by D'Angelo's mother Brianna for not protecting her son. As Burrell threatens to expose the FBI's report on Daniels' excess capital if he does not shut down the investigation, Daniels refuses to back down. The detail finally moves against Avon, with Daniels arresting him. McNulty foregoes arresting Stringer, believing they can catch him later. Freamon and the team then learn that a business-related revitalization project being built in an area where the Barksdales have been amassing property.

== Production ==
=== Title reference ===
The title refers to the cleaning up of loose ends performed by the Barksdale crew, as recommended by their lawyer Maurice Levy, as well as that of the police, who are forced to bring in the case in the wake of the effects of "The Hunt" that interfered with their case due to the resulting changes made by the Barksdale organization.

=== Epigraph ===
This is me, yo, right here.

— Wallace

The epigraph is spoken by Wallace as he discusses his return to "the pit" with D'Angelo, explaining why he cannot stay in the countryside, and why he can't move to another part of Baltimore. This is because everything that he is has been molded into his part of the drug dealing institution of "the pit", meaning that he is stuck in the life the institution forced him into.

=== Music ===
The song playing during the conversation between Bodie and Stringer Bell is "Hip Hop", from the album Black on Both Sides by Mos Def.

=== Credits ===
==== Starring cast ====
Although credited, John Doman, Seth Gilliam, Andre Royo, and Sonja Sohn do not appear in this episode.

==== Guest stars ====
- Seth Gilliam as Detective Ellis Carver
- Domenick Lombardozzi as Detective Thomas "Herc" Hauk
- Clarke Peters as Detective Lester Freamon
- Jim True-Frost as Detective Roland "Prez" Pryzbylewski
- Michael B. Jordan as Wallace
- Corey Parker Robinson as Detective Leander Sydnor
- Wendy Grantham as Shardene Innes
- J. D. Williams as Preston "Boadie" Broadus
- Tray Chaney as Malik "Poot" Carr
- Michael Hyatt as Brianna Barksdale
- Michael Kostroff as Maurice Levy
- Latonya Borsay as Orlando's Dancer
- Tony D. Head as Major Bobby Reed
- Michael Salconi as Detective Michael Santangelo
- Isiah Whitlock as Senator Clay Davis
- Ingrid Cornell as Nakeesha Lyles
- Jarvis George as Ronnie Mo
- Doug Roberts as State's Attorney Steven Demper
- Giselle Watts as Darcia Wallace
- Takara Collins as Deirdre Kresson

=== First appearances ===
Brianna Barksdale: D'Angelo's mother and Avon's sister who is fully aware of their business.

== Reception ==
The Futon Critic named it the fifth best episode of 2002, saying "You'd be hard pressed to find a harder to watch sequence than this one in 2002 as Poot and Bodie have to step up and get rid of the gentle and kind-hearted Wallace. I get the shivers just thinking about it." Alan Sepinwall wrote in The Star-Ledger in 2008 that the episode is considered by many "fans to be the series' best -- and most painful -- episode ever." Sepinwall wrote that Wallace's death was the first of the show's "many great tragedies...and still the one that probably cuts deepest."
