= Marlo Stanfield =

Character from The Wire

- The Wire character
- Jamie Hector as Marlo Stanfield
- First appearance: "Time after Time" (2004)
- Last appearance: "–30–" (2008)
- Created by: David Simon
- Portrayed by: Jamie Hector

In-universe information
- Alias: Black
- Gender: Male
- Occupation: Drug lord

Marlo Stanfield is a fictional character on the HBO television drama The Wire, played by actor Jamie Hector. Stanfield is a young, ambitious, intelligent and ruthless gangster and head of the eponymous Stanfield Organization in the Baltimore drug trade. Marlo's organization starts out small-time, competing with the larger Barksdale Organization, but becomes a major player in the Baltimore drug trade fairly quickly.

A repeated theme in Marlo's characterization is his demand for unconditional respect, which supersedes all other concerns. He frequently orders the deaths of those who disrespect him or undermine his name on the streets, and is the most ruthless and violent of the drug kingpins portrayed in The Wire.

== Character background and plot relations ==
Marlo's background prior to his drug empire is largely unexplored. He was a previous suspect in an unsolved case for Vernon Holley. Holley believed it was Marlo who killed his only witness as well as the original victims, yet no evidence could be traced back to him. The Barksdale Organization already had all the prime territory on the westside in the form of the public housing towers, and Stringer Bell had little interest in the street corners, which put him at odds with his business partner Avon.

Marlo's established rule and reputation is only noticed by the returning Barksdale dealers and soldiers after City Hall demolishes the towers, and Avon wishes to return to their roots in the streets, which escalates an all-out war over the best territory of the westside.

=== Season 3 ===
Marlo is introduced in season 3 as an up-and-coming drug player who controls many corners in West Baltimore. Marlo and his primary enforcer Chris Partlow wage war with the Barksdale crew over this territory. Marlo's ambition is to seek full control of the drug trade in West Baltimore.

Following the demolition of their project buildings, the Barksdale Organization approaches Marlo by way of Bodie Broadus to discuss sharing territory in exchange for a supply of the Barksdales' high quality heroin. Marlo refuses to acknowledge Bodie, who has set up his own crew within Stanfield established territory, and insists that Bodie move his people away. Marlo later has one of his dealers, Fruit, and his crew give Bodie's crew a beating, demonstrating that Marlo is not going to lie down and let the Barksdale organization move into his territory.

Stringer Bell visits Marlo personally to try to convince him to join the New Day Co-Op, a group of Baltimore drug players who buy packages of narcotics together to receive a discount and who try to reduce the violence of their business in order to avoid police attention. Marlo listens to Stringer without comment, and shortly after Stringer leaves, tells Chris to prepare for war.

Unbeknownst to Marlo and Stringer, their meeting has been observed by Kima Greggs and Jimmy McNulty, although they initially assume that Marlo is working for the Barksdale organization like many other crews in the West side. Greggs and McNulty pay a visit to the Homicide division to learn more about Marlo and find that Vernon Holley had investigated Marlo for a murder. Holley had built a case against Marlo using a key witness who was murdered before the case went to trial. Holley believes Marlo killed the witness and describes Marlo as "the spawn of the devil". When a failed Barksdale assault on a Stanfield corner results in the deaths of two Barksdale soldiers, the Major Crimes Unit realizes that Marlo's crew is independent of the Barksdale organization, and that the two gangs are at war.

The assault has been triggered by Avon's parole, and Avon's more confrontational approach to the turf war than Stringer's. Marlo thinks the failed assault shows a lack of strength in the Barksdale organization, and discusses this with Chris and Vinson. Avon then orders a second attack, carried out by Dennis "Cutty" Wise and Slim Charles, in which a Stanfield dealer named Boo is killed, and Fruit escapes after Cutty hesitates.

Marlo feigns retreat, then organizes retaliatory attacks against Barksdale territory. Snoop kills the Barksdale soldier Rico in a drive-by on Poot Carr's corner. Avon responds by hiring a woman named Devonne to seduce Marlo and lure him to a meeting. Although Marlo has sex with Devonne, he grows suspicious of her. Before their next arranged meeting, he has Chris and Snoop scout the location.

Chris spots an SUV responding to Devonne's presence and correctly deduces that the meeting is a setup. Chris has his driver drive up alongside the Barksdale vehicle and lets off a single shotgun blast through a side window, wounding Avon and killing another Barksdale soldier named Tater. Marlo and Chris later track down Devonne to her house, where Marlo personally kills her by shooting her once in each breast, then once in the mouth. Avon responds by ordering more attacks. An attack led by Slim Charles kills two Stanfield soldiers.

When Stringer Bell is murdered, the police and drug gangs assumed that Marlo is responsible. In reality, Avon had facilitated his death by giving Brother Mouzone (and in turn Omar Little) information about Stringer's whereabouts.

Marlo and Chris come close to also being murdered when Slim Charles tracks them down. The Major Crimes Unit, acting on a tip Stringer had given to Major Colvin, raid the Barksdale armory. Slim Charles calls for backup, but Avon and his soldiers are arrested.

At the end of season 3, Avon is convicted of parole violations (and possibly a conspiracy charge). Marlo and Chris attend his sentencing hearing. Avon acknowledges Marlo, thus conceding that the crown has been passed.

=== Season 4 ===
Marlo begins season 4 in control of all the best territory in Western Baltimore. He ruthlessly protects his territory through Chris and Snoop, who kill off targets on Marlo's orders and hide the bodies in vacant buildings. When one of Marlo's crew chiefs, Fruit, is killed by a dealer from Bodie's gang named Lex, Marlo quickly orders his death.

Marlo furthers his reputation around the neighborhood by having Monk Metcalf give away money to children during the back-to-school period. Although most children are happy to accept the money, Michael Lee notably refuses, in an early show of his strength of character. Marlo keeps his own skills and his soldiers' sharp by organizing shooting practice sessions in the woods.

The Major Crimes Unit targets Marlo and begins to monitor his organization using wiretaps, but fails to link him to any murders because of the hidden bodies. They do manage to get Marlo on tape when he uses Monk's phone to talk to a subordinate known as "Old Face" Andre. When Bill Rawls puts Lt. Charles Marimow in charge of the MCU for political reasons, the investigation stalls, due to Marimow's ordering a shutdown of the money-tracing.

"Proposition Joe" Stewart engineers a conflict between Marlo and Omar Little in an attempt to demonstrate the benefits of joining Joe's drug cartel: the New Day Co-Op. Stanfield agrees to join the Co-Op to learn more about Omar and the mounting police interest in his own organization. Omar then robs a card game Marlo is in and they come face to face. Omar sticks a gun in Marlo’s face and takes a prized ring Marlo obtained from Old Face Andre.

Marlo plans to have Omar framed and killed in jail. The plan fails, and Omar retaliates by stealing an entire shipment of narcotics meant for the New Day Co-Op. Marlo is suspicious of Prop Joe's claim that the shipment has been stolen and insists on some kind of satisfaction. Prop Joe agrees to set up a meeting between Marlo and his suppliers (The Greeks). Marlo meets with Spiros "Vondas" Vondopoulos and is convinced that Prop Joe was not involved in the robbery. Marlo begins having Vondas followed in order to learn more about Vondas' role in importing drugs into Baltimore.

At the same time, Marlo is impressed with the teenager Michael Lee for standing up to him and believes Michael would make a good soldier. Marlo orders Chris and Snoop to recruit Michael. Michael's abusive stepfather is released from prison and Michael, believing that no one else can help him, goes to Marlo. Michael agrees to join Marlo's gang in exchange for having his stepfather killed. Marlo sets up Michael and his brother Bug in an apartment, and gives Michael his own corner, with Duquan "Dukie" Weems, and Kenard working for him. When Lester Freamon finally discovers Marlo's "tombs" in the vacant houses, a massive police investigation begins, and the re-established Major Crimes Unit begins investigating Marlo once again.

=== Season 5 ===
After being investigated for over a year, Marlo and his people are extremely cautious when communicating with each other. They only speak face to face and often drive all over the city in an effort to lose any tails before arriving at their meeting spot. Eventually, the Major Crimes Unit's investigation is shut down by Mayor Tommy Carcetti for economic reasons.

In response, Marlo and his crew become more relaxed in their routine, convinced that they have worn the police down. Confident that he is not being watched, Marlo orders Chris and Snoop to undertake several murders. He first dispatches them to execute a drug dealer named Junebug for spreading rumors about Marlo and to attack the territory of another drug dealer named Webster Franklin, until Franklin agrees to take the Stanfield package. Marlo also orders Chris and Snoop to find and kill Omar, who has left Baltimore and retired from robbing drug dealers.

Marlo quietly plans to strongarm the supply and control of the New Day Co-Op away from Prop Joe. Marlo aims to establish a direct relationship with Spiros and The Greeks' drug trafficking organization. Marlo has Chris investigate the port case at the courthouse and then bribes the former Greek soldier Sergei Malatov by depositing money into his canteen account at MCI Jessup, in order to be put on his visitor list. Marlo goes to visit Malatov, hoping to get a direct line to Vondas, but finds himself blocked by Avon.

Avon states that he has no ill-will towards Marlo, and appreciates his ambition to establish Westside dominance over Proposition Joe's Co-Op. However, Avon reminds Marlo that he is still a man of formidable reputation and is considered an authority figure in the prison. He tells Marlo that all business in Jessup must go through him and demands that Marlo pay his sister $100,000 in order to gain access to Sergei. Marlo makes the payment, and Avon grants him access to Sergei. Sergei is disrespectful towards Marlo but is convinced by Avon to help Marlo reach Vondas.

Marlo is directed to Little Johnny's Diner, the Greeks' headquarters. He delivers a case of money to the counterman, Andreas, and tells him to inform Vondas of his desire to meet.

Marlo seeks Prop Joe's guidance in money laundering while simultaneously preparing to overthrow him. Prop Joe introduces Stanfield to a pastor who has relationships with overseas charities that he uses to launder money for a ten percent "donation fee".

When Marlo meets with Vondas, Vondas is displeased that Marlo has presented him with dirty bills from the street. Marlo returns to Prop Joe to get his money cleaned. Marlo later drops off the clean money at Little Johnny's, telling the counterman to inform Vondas that he meant no disrespect. Afterwards, Marlo takes a trip to the off-shore bank in the Antilles in order to make sure his laundered money is safe.

Marlo learns about Omar's confidant Butchie from Prop Joe's nephew Cheese. Marlo has Chris and Snoop torture and kill Butchie. They leave a witness to ensure word reaches Omar, but Snoop is concerned that they are provoking Omar without having any idea of how to get to him.

Marlo also has Prop Joe introduce him to defense attorney Maurice Levy to assist in Marlo's money laundering. Marlo then returns to Vondas and convinces The Greek to consider him as an insurance policy should anything happen to Prop Joe.

Marlo senses a growing rift between Cheese and Prop Joe, and looks to capitalize on it. After Cheese argues with a rival drug kingpin named Hungry Man at a Co-Op meeting, Marlo sees his chance. He has Chris and Snoop kidnap Hungry Man and deliver him to Cheese. Marlo asks Cheese to betray Prop Joe in exchange. Cheese leaves Prop Joe unprotected at his home, and Marlo traps him there. Marlo looks on as Chris shoots Joe in the back of the head.

Marlo assumes Proposition Joe's position as The Greek's narcotics distributor in Baltimore. Marlo is given a phone, and Vondas shows him how to communicate with the Greeks without speaking; the phone is used to send pictures of clock faces that are coded to indicate meeting places. Marlo plans a visit to Atlantic City to celebrate his victory, but Chris reminds him that they must remain in hiding until Omar has been dealt with. Chris prepares to ambush Omar in Monk's apartment, but Omar escapes by leaping from the balcony.

Marlo continues to use Levy to launder money and gives Levy his new cell phone number. Levy's defense investigator Thomas "Herc" Hauk copies the number after hours and passes it to Ellis Carver, ultimately resulting in Freamon's setting up an illegal wiretap.

At the next Co-Op meeting Marlo informs the Co-op he was responsible for the murder of Prop Joe because he had made a move against Omar, and Omar had retaliated by killing Prop Joe. Marlo then assumes control: he appoints Cheese the head of distribution on the East Side and Monk the West Side. Marlo increases both the bounty on Omar and the cost of the product, and rules that no further group meetings will take place; instead, the members will either have to keep their problems to themselves or meet with Stanfield alone.

Chris marshals his people to search for Omar, but Omar eludes them and remains a thorn in the Stanfield Organization's side. Omar then robs a money pick-up and wounds a Stanfield soldier. Omar also robs a Marlo stash house, where he kills an enforcer named Manny, and he later kills Savino Bratton. Omar calls for Marlo to face him in the streets and attacks his reputation at every opportunity, but Chris prevents this information from reaching Marlo.

Omar is ultimately killed by Kenard. Omar's possessions include a list of Stanfield personnel, which is passed to Freamon and allows him to make the connection between Marlo and Cheese.

Eventually, Leander Sydnor breaks the clock code, and the police are able to follow Chris to a major resupply from the Greeks using the evidence from their illegal wiretap. Monk is arrested with large quantities of drugs, and Marlo, Partlow, and Cheese are arrested for conspiracy to supply narcotics. Chris also has a murder warrant for Devar Manigault.

Marlo believes that Michael Lee may be the source of information listed in the arrest warrants, as Manigault was Michael's stepfather. Marlo orders Snoop to kill Michael, but Michael realizes he is being set up and kills Snoop first. Marlo is enraged when he learns that Omar had been assaulting his street reputation and insists that when released he will re-establish his name.

Levy senses that the timing of the arrests was too soon after the initial arrest of Monk and surmises that the police used illegal surveillance. Sensing the state's reluctance to take the compromised evidence to court, Levy negotiates a deal for Marlo: Marlo will go free with his charges suspended on the state docket but will face prosecution if he returns to drug distribution. Chris will face life without the possibility of parole and will have to plead guilty to all of the vacant house murders. Monk faces a lengthy sentence on a plea bargain with no possibility of bail. Cheese is also facing a long sentence but is granted bail, so Marlo charges him to kill Michael.

Marlo holds a meeting with two Co-Op members (including Fat-Face Rick and Slim Charles) from the prison and offers to sell them the connection to the Greeks for 10 million dollars, claiming that he plans to become a businessman. The Co-Op raises the funds, but Slim Charles murders Cheese in revenge for Cheese's betrayal of Proposition Joe before he can carry out Marlo's order. Fat-Face Rick and Slim Charles assume control of the connection.

After Marlo's release, Levy introduces him to property developers and other prominent Baltimore businessmen at an evening event. However, Marlo quietly slips out of the event and approaches two young corner boys – who are talking about Omar and mythologizing his death – and provokes a fight by asking, "Do you know who I am?", the answer evidently being that they don't. One of the boys is armed with a gun and the other with a knife, but Marlo manages to disarm them and win the fight, causing the boys to run away. Marlo's arm is cut in the scuffle. He is finally left standing alone on the corner, looking at the streets that he once ruled.

== Analysis ==
Jamie Hector has commented that he sees the character as striving to obtain power rather than profit and revelling in using that power over others. The series' creator David Simon has also commented that Stanfield is driven by a desire for totalitarian power. Hector has said that much of his performance stems from trying to capture Stanfield as a man of power and economy using minimalist movement and speech.

When critic Alan Sepinwall interviewed Simon about the fate of the character, Simon said he considers Stanfield's fate to be a kind of justice, as he is cut off from his power and reputation. Sepinwall hailed Stanfield's ending as defying the viewers' expectations to see the character incarcerated or murdered in the streets.

Simon also commented that the ending was intended to be ironic, as Stanfield receives everything that his one-time rival Stringer Bell desired (in terms of becoming a legitimate, respected businessman) but does not value it. Simon has also said the character's ending was deliberately ambiguous.

In 2016, Rolling Stone ranked him #2 of their "40 Greatest TV Villains of All Time".

== Real life origins ==
In the mid-1980s, Timmirror Stanfield was a major Baltimore drug trafficker. In 1986, Stanfield was 25 and ran a gang which included over 50 members including his half brother Marlow Bates. The Stanfield gang controlled South Baltimore's Westport area and West Baltimore's Murphy Homes housing project.

The gang committed multiple murders and drew the attention of authorities, who were able to persuade 15 witnesses to testify. The core of the gang was convicted. This real life criminal forms the basis of the character's origins while emphasizing the rise in brutality from the American heroin trade of the 1970s to the crack cocaine trade of the 1980s.
