= -30- (The Wire) =

- The Wire episode
- Episode no.: Season 5 Episode 10
- Directed by: Clark Johnson
- Story by: David Simon; Ed Burns
- Teleplay by: David Simon
- Original air date: March 9, 2008
- Running time: 93 minutes

Episode chronology
← Previous "Late Editions"	Next → —

"-30-" is the series finale of the American television drama series The Wire. It is the tenth episode of the fifth season, and the 60th episode overall. Written by series creator/executive producer David Simon (teleplay/story) and co-executive producer Ed Burns (story), and directed by Clark Johnson (who also directed the pilot episode and stars on the show), the episode originally aired on HBO on March 9, 2008. This episode is the longest-running episode of the series, with a runtime of 93 minutes. The episode's writers were nominated for the Primetime Emmy Award for Outstanding Writing for a Drama Series.

== Plot ==
Tommy Carcetti and his staff learn that the "serial killer" was a hoax. McNulty and Freamon, unaware that their scheme has been exposed, discover that Gary DiPasquale has leaked courthouse documents to Levy. When Freamon gives Pearlman the identity of the mole, she reveals her knowledge of the detectives' duplicity.

Templeton calls 911, and claims there was an attempted kidnapping of an inebriated homeless man which he witnessed. When the police arrive, the man is too drunk to confirm or deny the claims, though an undercover officer at the scene confirms that Templeton made up the story. Marlo and his crew learn of Snoop's death and agree that Michael must be eliminated. Cheese posts bail and Marlo instructs him to hunt down Michael. Freamon informs McNulty that Daniels and Pearlman know about the hoax and the illegal wiretap.

Levy goes through the Stanfield arrest warrants and realizes that the police used an illegal wiretap to decipher the code beforehand. McNulty, Bunk, and Greggs arrive at the scene of another homeless murder, and are distraught that McNulty's fictitious serial killer has inspired a copycat.

Pearlman and Bond are told by Steintorf to quietly settle the Stanfield case out of court to keep the illegal wiretaps from being brought to light. Pearlman meets with Levy and uses a taped conversation given to her by Freamon to force him to settle. McNulty is confronted by Daniels and Rawls, who order him to quickly catch the copycat so that the press will assume he is the original killer.

McNulty identifies a mentally ill homeless man as the killer and the Baltimore Police Department charge him with two of the six "murders". Carcetti holds a press conference taking credit for both the "serial killer's" capture and the Stanfield arrests, then promotes Daniels to Police Commissioner. However, after Steintorf once again requests that Daniels "juke the stats" to boost Carcetti's position on crime reduction, he refuses, and is forced to resign after Campbell threatens to expose his past wrongdoings. Sydnor vents his frustration to Judge Phelan in a scene mirroring McNulty and Phelan's interaction in the first episode.

Cheese is killed by Slim Charles for his role in Proposition Joe's murder. Michael becomes a stickup man and robs Vinson in his rim shop, where Michael shoots Vinson in the knee with a shotgun to force him into surrendering his drug money, in a manner similar to Omar. Marlo attends a high society party with Levy but leaves in frustration after Levy attempts to introduce him to developers. Out on the street he overhears two corner boys discussing legendary tales about Omar's death. Marlo provokes them into attacking him, flaunting his name, but the corner boys do not recognize him. After getting into physical confrontation, the boys flee and Marlo dominates the corner for himself, having sustained a knife wound in his arm. He relishes his victory, alone, in the empty street.

McNulty locates Larry and drives him back to Baltimore, stopping to look over the city on the way.

In a closing montage: Freamon is making his miniature furniture at home; Herc is socializing at a bar with Baltimore PD members; Templeton wins a Pulitzer Prize; Slim Charles and Fat Face Rick meet with Spiros while the Greek listens in; Carcetti is elected governor while Campbell becomes mayor; Gus looks on as others happily work in the newsroom; Valchek replaces Daniels as Commissioner; Dukie uses the money he borrowed from Prez to feed his new drug addiction; Pearlman, now a judge, recuses herself from a case Daniels is arguing as a defense attorney; Chris Partlow talks to Wee-Bey in the prison yard; Carcetti makes Rawls superintendent of the Maryland State Police; Bubbles eats a meal with his sister in her kitchen; Kenard is arrested.

The montage ends with rapid cuts of various scenes from the show and people of Baltimore. McNulty gets back in his car and says to Larry, "Let's go home". They drive off while the shot remains on Interstate 83 overlooking Baltimore.

== Production ==
=== Title reference ===
-30- is a journalistic term that has been used to signify the end of a story.

=== Epigraph ===
...the life of kings.

— H. L. Mencken

This is seen in the lobby of the Baltimore Sun, as an excerpt from a longer Mencken quote displayed on the wall when Alma talks with Gus after she has been demoted to the Carroll County bureau. The full quote reads "...as I look back over a misspent life, I find myself more and more convinced that I had more fun doing news reporting than in any other enterprise. It is really the life of kings."

=== Music ===
The Blind Boys of Alabama's version of Tom Waits' "Way Down in the Hole" plays over the episode's closing montage. This version of the song had previously been used as the theme music for the show's first season.

During the scene where McNulty plays Trouble with Beadie Russell's children, the song that can be heard playing in the background is "Rich Woman" by Alison Krauss and Robert Plant from their 2007 album Raising Sand.

"Body of an American" by The Pogues is heard during McNulty's staged "detective's wake", making it the third time the song was used in the course of the show's run. Also, "The Broad Majestic Shannon" can be heard echoing out of the bar in the scene after the "wake".

=== Credits ===
==== Starring cast ====
Although credited, Michael K. Williams and Isiah Whitlock, Jr. do not appear in this episode.

==== Guest stars ====
- Jim True-Frost as Roland "Prez" Pryzbylewski
- Peter Gerety as Judge Daniel Phelan
- Amy Ryan as Beatrice "Beadie" Russell
- Paul Ben-Victor as Spiros "Vondas" Vondopoulos
- Bill Raymond as The Greek
- Delaney Williams as Jay Landsman
- Marlyne Afflack as Nerese Campbell
- Steve Earle as Walon
- Ptolemy Slocum as Business Card Homeless Man
- Maria Broom as Marla Daniels
- David Costabile as Thomas Klebanow
- Sam Freed as James Whiting
- Anwan Glover as Slim Charles
- Hassan Johnson as Roland "Wee-Bey" Brice
- Method Man as Melvin "Cheese" Wagstaff
- Dion Graham as Rupert Bond
- Thomas J. McCarthy as Tim Phelps
- Robert Poletick as Steven Luxenberg
- Michael Willis as Andy Krawczyk
- Donald Neal as Jay Spry
- Kara Quick as Rebecca Corbett
- Brandon Young as Mike Fletcher
- William F. Zorzi as Bill Zorzi
- Al Brown as Stan Valchek
- Ed Norris as Ed Norris
- Michael Salconi as Michael Santangelo
- Brian Anthony Wilson as Vernon Holley
- Megan Anderson as Jen Carcetti
- Benay Berger as Amanda Reese
- Eisa Davis as Rae
- Tootsie Duvall as Assistant Principal Marcia Donnelly
- Wendy Grantham as Shardene Innes
- Bobby Brown as Bobby Brown
- Dennis Hill as Detective Christeson
- Doug Olear as Terrance "Fitz" Fitzhugh
- Rick Otto as Kenneth Dozerman
- Gregory L. Williams as Michael Crutchfield
- Thuliso Dingwall as Kenard
- Dave Ettlin as Dave Ettlin
- Edward Green as Spider
- Kwame Patterson as Monk Metcalf
- Stephen Schnetzer as Robert Ruby
- Carl Schoettler as Carl Schoettler
- William Joseph Brookes as Lawrence Butler
- Sho "Swordsman" Brown as Phil Boy
- Norris Davis as Vinson
- Reggie A. Green as Arabber
- Joey Odoms as Corner boy
- Troj. Marquis Strickland as Ricardo "Fat Face Rick" Hendrix
- Connor Aikin as Jack Russell
- Sophia Ayoud as Cary Russell
- Gary D'Addario as Gary DiPasquale
- Clinton "Shorty" Buise as Clinton "Shorty" Buise
- Alan V. Poulson as Developer
- Dionne Audain as Social Worker
- Chris Kies as Petey the drunk
- Stephen Kinigopoulos as Officer
- Jeff Wincott as Johnny Weaver
- Henry Carter as unknown
- Edward C. Lewis as unknown
- George Smith as unknown

==== Uncredited appearances ====
- David Simon as Baltimore Sun staff member
- Rebecca Corbett as Baltimore Sun staff member

== Reception ==
Writers Ed Burns and David Simon were nominated for the Primetime Emmy Award in the category Outstanding Writing for a Drama Series for their work on the finale.

New York Times television critic Alessandra Stanley said the show "went out the way it came in" but that was to be expected. "The best and most dyspeptic police drama on television would never conclude with a triumph of good over evil", she wrote after the show's final broadcast.

The Baltimore Sun was less than thrilled with the finale. Critic David Zurawik wrote that the finale was just another example of how the final season of the show "lost its heart and its way." Zurawik praised the first four seasons but blasted the finale. "Simon so forces events in the improbable newspaper story line of an invented serial killer that he does serious damage to the credibility of the police drama," he wrote.

Writing in a retrospective for Collider, Jeremy Urquhart praised the finale. "The final sequence of The Wire's final episode finishes things on a particularly notable high, and is likely striking enough to make even the season's detractors feel moved."
