= Brother Mouzone =

Character from The Wire

- The Wire character
- Michael Potts as Brother Mouzone
- First appearance: "Stray Rounds" (2003)
- Last appearance: "Mission Accomplished" (2004)
- Created by: David Simon
- Portrayed by: Michael Potts

In-universe information
- Gender: Male
- Occupation: Hired enforcer

Brother Mouzone is a fictional character on the HBO drama The Wire, played by actor Michael Potts.

== Character history ==
Brother Mouzone (from Arabic موزون mawzūn, meaning "balanced,” "weighted") is a drug enforcer and hitman from New York City. "The Brother" does not fit the usual picture of drug-trade "muscle"; he always wears a suit, bowtie, and glasses, and speaks politely and precisely. He is also quite learned, reading magazines such as The Economist, Harper's, The Atlantic, The New Republic, and The Nation.

His dress and extremely proper and pious persona resembles those associated with the Nation of Islam, more particularly its paramilitary wing, the Fruit of Islam, although it is never explicitly stated that he belongs to either organization. Also, his character might be inspired by the Black Mafia, a criminal organization comprising mainly Muslim African Americans that has close connections with the Nation of Islam, but unlike those affiliated with the Nation of Islam, is involved in drug trafficking.

Upon first encountering him, the street dealer Cheese mocked Mouzone's formal style of dress by remarking that he must either be in "the Nation" or still let his mother pick out his clothes. Mouzone reveals he is a Muslim by mouthing "Allahu akbar" repeatedly after Omar shoots him and Mouzone believes he is about to die. He is always accompanied by his "man" Lamar, who runs errands for him.

=== Season 2 ===
Avon Barksdale hires Mouzone to protect the weakened Barksdale operation from Proposition Joe's dealers, who are working the Barksdale towers as part of a secret agreement between Stringer Bell and Proposition Joe. Mouzone confronts and promptly shoots Cheese Wagstaff with rat shot. He then informs Cheese that the next bullet in the chamber is a copper-jacketed hollow point bullet of his own design. Cheese and his dealers flee.

To maintain his alliance with Proposition Joe, Stringer dupes Omar Little into believing that Mouzone is responsible for the brutal murder of Omar's boyfriend Brandon. After Omar shoots Mouzone, Omar and Mouzone talk, leading Omar to realize that he has been tricked: the talk makes clear Mouzone is a ruthlessly efficient assassin who favors execution-style murder, so torturing Brandon to death is not Mouzone's style. Omar calls an ambulance for Mouzone and departs. While recovering in hospital Mouzone informs Stringer that their agreement is "absolved" and later returns to New York.

=== Season 3 ===
In season 3, Mouzone returns to Baltimore. He finds Omar's boyfriend Dante after seeking advice from Baltimore local Vinson. Mouzone beats Dante until he reveals Omar's whereabouts. Rather than exact vengeance on Omar for shooting him, Mouzone suggests that they find and kill Stringer Bell together.

Avon, whose relationship with Stringer has become strained since they have repeatedly clashed on strategy and Stringer revealed he was responsible for D'Angelo Barksdale's death, reluctantly gives Mouzone a time and a place to find Stringer after Mouzone threatens the Barksdale organization's connection to New York. Mouzone and Omar ambush and kill Stringer Bell, ending the story arc that began with Stringer's pursuit of Omar in season 1. Before returning to New York, Mouzone releases Dante and gives Omar his weapon to dispose of.
