= Bodie Broadus =

Character from The Wire

Preston Broadus
- The Wire character
- J. D. Williams as Bodie Broadus
- First appearance: "The Target" (2002)
- Last appearance: "Final Grades" (2006)
- Created by: David Simon
- Portrayed by: J. D. Williams

In-universe information
- Alias: Bodie
- Occupation: Crew Chief
- Family: Unnamed grandmother James (brother, deceased) (mother, deceased)

Preston "Bodie" Broadus is a fictional character on the HBO drama series The Wire, played by actor J. D. Williams for four seasons. Bodie is initially a rough, low-level drug dealer, but matures throughout the series and slowly rises through the ranks. Bodie is an intelligent and disciplined lieutenant, showing strong loyalty to the Barksdale Organization even after most of its members are imprisoned or killed.

Bodie is a relatively goodhearted character who sticks to his principles, but at times he can be violent, such as when he takes part in the murder of friend and fellow dealer Wallace on orders from Stringer Bell. His relationship with the police is also dynamic. He is initially hostile towards all police, but eventually earns the respect of Officer Jimmy McNulty. Bodie, Savino and Poot are the only characters to move from the Barksdale Organization to the Marlo Stanfield crew.

== Biography ==
Preston "Bodie" Broadus was raised by his grandmother after his mother fell into addiction and homelessness, dying when he was four years old. Bodie's grandmother says that when she took him in, "he was only four, but even then, I knew he was angry." He began working with the Barksdales at age 13. His older brother James was also a gangster, but was killed early in Bodie's life, depriving him of immediate familial support.

=== Season one ===
Bodie, aged 16, worked under D'Angelo Barksdale in the low-rise projects known as "The Pit", with his friends Poot and Wallace. He was a more prominent member of the area, and was also more openly violent and hostile than his peers. This caused Bodie to chafe under D'Angelo's soft style of leadership and led him to sometimes challenge his authority. When The Pit's stash was robbed, he made a positive impression on Stringer Bell by noticing the name of the stick-up artist, Omar Little, and describing the van.

Bodie often displayed a quick, violent temper; he instigated the severe beating of drug addict Johnny Weeks after he buys heroin from them with fake money. In a later conversation in which D'Angelo tries to emphasize decent treatment of the customers, Bodie is unsympathetic; this is perhaps because of his mother's addiction-fueled negligence while she was still alive. Later, Bodie punched Detective Mahon while being searched. Bodie received a beating for this, from Detectives Hauk, Greggs and Carver.

He was arrested, but almost immediately after arriving at a juvenile detention facility, he walked out, stole a car, and was soon back in Baltimore dealing again. Going back to the pit he challenges D'Angelo who tells him about the participation in the murder of Deirdre Kresson, giving them some details. He became a personal target of Herc and Carver, who picked him up in the pit and gave him a second beating. However, while waiting for prisoner transfer, they softened towards him over a game of pool. The Barksdale Organization's lawyer, Maurice Levy, soon convinced a judge to release Bodie. Herc and Carver were incredulous at this, but when they realized he had legitimately beaten the charges against him (thanks to Levy), they relented.

Later, Bodie was tasked by Stringer Bell to murder his friend Wallace after Avon Barksdale decided to eliminate anyone who might talk to the police. Bodie's willingness to carry out the hit further impressed Stringer. He gathered Poot with little hesitation to aid him in his job. During the lead up to the hit, Bodie was the more confident of the two; however, when they cornered a fearful Wallace, who pleaded with his friends, Bodie showed much hesitation. Only after Poot told him to finish it did he pull the trigger. Poot then took the gun and finished Wallace off. After the arrest of his one-time mentor and crew chief D'Angelo, Bodie's leadership skills shone and he stepped into the position by gathering The Pit's members to physically force away a rival drug gang.

=== Season two ===
Stringer began entrusting Bodie with more difficult tasks, such as picking up the main supply in Philadelphia, and assigned him one of the prized Franklin Terrace Towers to run. Poot was assigned to run the pit and he reported to Bodie. They faced problems with poor quality product because the Barksdales' favored New York City suppliers severed ties following Avon's arrest. Bodie came up with considered suggestions to work around the problem at Stringer's meetings.

When Stringer entered a deal with Prop Joe to give away some of the Barksdale territory for Proposition Joe's superior heroin, Bodie tried to find new territory and steal it from another crew. This resulted in the other crew's starting a gunfight, which resulted in the accidental death of a child. After failing to adequately dispose of the guns, Bodie was picked up and interrogated by detectives Ed Norris and Ray Cole in connection with the crime. They attempted to bluff a confession out of him, but he saw through their trick and was released.

=== Season three ===
The Franklin Towers were demolished and Avon Barksdale was released from prison. Western District Major Colvin tried to deal with the spread of the drug problem by offering "drug zones" where dealers and users would go unpunished. Bodie worked in one such zone nicknamed "Hamsterdam"; this brought him back into contact with Herc and Carver, now working in the Western District. When the police made their inevitable move to shut down the free zones, Detectives McNulty and Greggs tried to arrest Bodie for possession.

Bodie, having already once been stopped but quickly released by McNulty on his way into Hamsterdam, displayed his characteristically sharp mind during interrogation and cited entrapment (or "contrapment" as he mistakenly put it) leading to wrongful arrest, leaving an impressed McNulty and Pearlman no choice but to let him go. He also helped Dennis "Cutty" Wise to contact Avon Barksdale on several occasions; the two appeared to have a rapport and mutual respect most likely derived from Cutty's old sparring days with Bodie's older brother, James.

The Barksdale organization became embroiled in a turf war with Marlo Stanfield's crew. Although Bodie's crew was badly beaten, Bodie himself was not present at the time of the assault. The escalating murder rate brought further police attention. Avon was sent back to prison, Stringer was murdered, Bodie is the first to seek vengance against Marlo, but is ordered by Slim Charles to wait, before Slim and Avon can make a move on the Stansfield, Stringer gave Bunny Colvin the Barksdale hideout, before his death resulting in the Police arresting Avon along with his crew and the gang was scattered. Bodie was one of the few prominent Barksdale members not present at the home-base, which spared him from the weapons charges.

=== Season four ===
Bodie was forced onto a less-desirable corner due to the Stanfield Organization's complete control of what used to be the Barksdale Organization's territories. His newest crew included his second in command Curtis "Lex" Anderson, Little Kevin and Reesy; he employed Namond Brice as a runner out of respect for his father's reputation, despite Namond's poor attitude and lack of street skills. He tried to tempt Michael Lee, a far more effective runner, to take a permanent position at his corner, but Michael declined.

Bodie's experience and intelligence allowed him to build up a solid business in his out-of-the-way corner, even with a lack of muscle and experienced support, as he was able to hire only younger dealers and inexperienced students like Namond. He continued to have dealings with Carver and McNulty, since his operation was within the Western District, and was considered a source of information for the two; this was shown most when they immediately came to him in confidence after Lex's disappearance. After being released from prison midway through the season, Bodie's oldest surviving colleague Poot returned and helped Bodie by working on his corner.

Bodie was supplied quality product by ex-Barksdale enforcer Slim Charles, now working for Proposition Joe. Slim's connections and support helped Bodie build his corner into a good drug market. Chris Partlow and Marlo noticed this and offered Bodie an ultimatum: let Marlo's operation take over the corner by force, or remain but work Marlo's less profitable heroin package. Bodie had no muscle in his crew, and even after seeking out Slim Charles, still submitted, though enraged. He ultimately agreed to selling the package offered by Marlo after realizing that he would receive no support in defying Marlo.

In a fit of romantic jealousy, Bodie's subordinate, Lex, murdered his ex-girlfriend's new boyfriend, a Stanfield dealer known as Fruit. In retribution, Stanfield enforcers Chris and Snoop executed Lex, in an ambush he was lured into by his co-worker Little Kevin, with the unwitting assistance of Randy Wagstaff. After Bodie later advised Little Kevin to go see Marlo after the latter asked for his audience, Little Kevin was executed by Chris and Snoop because of his failure to follow directions to the letter.

Bodie felt that Marlo was violating the rules of the drug trade, yet he was unaware of Little Kevin's betrayal of Lex. He sought out Poot for advice on the matter, who disagreed with Bodie's resistant stance, saying that when they killed Wallace, it was just as unjustified. Bodie, however, remained certain that Wallace's death was necessary, as it involved betrayal, whereas Marlo's murders were ruthless killings.

After Little Kevin's body was discovered, Bodie was arrested for kicking in the windows of a police car in a rage. He was released on the recommendation of McNulty, who had developed a respect for Bodie since Season 1 and hoped to turn him as an informant against Marlo. In a subsequent conversation with McNulty, Bodie expressed resistance to giving information on his former Barksdale allies, but their unified hatred of everything Marlo had done ultimately convinced Bodie that he needed to step up in order to stop the wave of ruthless murder that had been caused under Marlo's reign.

Earlier, Bodie had been seen getting into McNulty's car by Monk, one of Marlo's lieutenants. Monk relayed this information to Marlo, who swiftly ordered Bodie's death. Later that night, Bodie was dealing with Poot and Spider when Chris and Snoop set up an ambush. Bodie decided to take a last stand, causing an unarmed Spider to retreat.

Throughout the fourth season, Chris and Snoop murdered various people and hid their bodies in abandoned row houses. While all of the previous victims put up a minimal fight and were dispatched with ease, Bodie decided to be the sole exception to this and shouted "you ain't putting me in one of them empty-ass houses neither". Poot tried to reason with his longtime friend but Bodie refused to retreat, either through pride in standing his ground or out of fear about dying unnoticed and rotting in a vacant house. He begins firing his gun wildly at Chris and Snoop damaging cars and causing his corner boys Spider, Kernard and others to flee with Poot remaining, trying to convince him to run. After realizing that Bodie could not be convinced otherwise, Poot retreated. Shortly after Poot's departure, while Bodie was still focused on Chris and Snoop, O-Dog emerged from a doorway behind Bodie and shot him twice in the head, killing him.

When McNulty learned of Bodie's death, he approached Poot, pretending to frisk him while asking him about what happened to Bodie, and was horrified to learn that Bodie was seen getting into McNulty's car, which led to his murder. McNulty was stricken with guilt and Bodie's death was what ultimately convinced him to return to the Major Crimes Unit, as he wished to catch Marlo and end his violent ways.

The report McNulty read about Bodie's murder listed his age as 26 at time of death. Chris Partlow eventually takes sole responsibility for Bodie's and the other vacant homicides, O-Dog who was being made to take responsibility for possession of his and Snoop's firearms, status is left unconfirmed.
