= Ellis Carver =

Fictional character from The Wire

- The Wire character
- Seth Gilliam as Ellis Carver
- First appearance: "The Target" (2002)
- Last appearance: "-30-" (2008)
- Created by: David Simon
- Portrayed by: Seth Gilliam

In-universe information
- Title(s): Detective; Sergeant; Lieutenant
- Occupation: Baltimore Police Detective; Baltimore Police Sergeant; Baltimore Police Lieutenant

Ellis Carver is a fictional character on the HBO drama The Wire, played by actor Seth Gilliam. Carver is a former Sergeant of the Baltimore Police Department's Western District Drug Enforcement Unit. While initially matched to the simple-minded and brutish policing of his loyal partner and unfailing friend Thomas "Herc" Hauk, under the counsel of Major Colvin in the Western District, Carver incrementally matures into a reflective and generally upstanding officer, often drawing the ire of his Western District colleagues.

== Biography ==
=== Season 1 ===
Carver is a narcotics detective under Major Foerster in season one; he joins the Barksdale detail along with his colleagues from narcotics, detectives Kima Greggs and Thomas "Herc" Hauk. Cedric Daniels, his shift lieutenant from narcotics, is assigned to command the detail. In Season 1, Episode 5 ("The Pager"), Carver tells Bodie Broadus that he was raised in the Flag House Courts housing project.

Herc and Carver typically work as a pair. They are intimidated by Greggs' ability and annoyed at her superior attitude towards them. They get into trouble early on in the investigation when they and Roland Pryzbylewski drunkenly raid a Barksdale-controlled high rise tower and nearly incite a riot. Prez exacerbates the situation by pistol-whipping a teenager. Daniels is exasperated with his detectives' immaturity and lack of forethought, but protects them from serious punishment.

The narcotics detectives take part in raids on Barksdale's low-rise projects. When one of the young dealers, Bodie Broadus, punches the elderly Patrick Mahon, Carver, Herc and Greggs give him a beating on the spot. Carver and Herc are later given the task of travelling to Bodie's juvenile detention centre to try to convince him to become an informant; Carver is optimistic about their chances. They arrive just as Bodie escapes by hitchhiking. Finding that he has absconded, they raid his home, finding only his grandmother.

Herc later finds Bodie in the low-rise projects while on surveillance with Carver, and they arrest him. Finding that he remains defiant the detectives give him another beating. Later, waiting to hand him over their attitude softens and the three share a game of pool. Bodie gets released from juvenile detention following the intervention of the Barksdale crew's lawyer Maurice Levy. Unaware of this Carver and Herc angrily pick him up the next time they see him, but after finding that he had been legitimately released they give him a lift home.

When they intercept the Barksdale crew's profits for a day by tailing Wee-Bey Brice, Herc considers keeping some of the money, but Carver realizes that figures mentioned on the wiretap might leave them exposed. Some of the money goes missing by accident, which leads Carver to doubt Herc until he finds the money in the spare-wheel well of their car. This also got both of them on Daniels' bad side. Otherwise, Carver and Herc are useful in performing tedious but essential surveillance work for the detail.

Carver takes his sergeant's exam and passes while in the detail. Although Herc scores better on the exam, Carver gets placed ahead of him on the promotion list because he's been relaying information about the detail's activities to Deputy Commissioner Ervin Burrell. Daniels eventually realizes that Carver is acting as Burrell's spy in the detail, and cautions Carver not to repeat the mistakes Daniels made earlier in his own career.

=== Season 2 ===
With the detail disbanded, Carver is moved to the Southeastern District, where he works as a traffic sergeant under Major Stanislaus Valchek. His dissatisfaction with the post is apparent when Valchek assigns him to ticket dock workers' vehicles and he openly voices his opinions of his commander to Frank Sobotka.

Daniels brings Carver back into his detail when investigating Sobotka, telling Carver that since he had been caught going outside the chain of command before, it is unlikely that he would try something similar again. Daniels' only condition is that Carver won't be treated as a sergeant in the detail, as he feels that Carver had not earned his promotion and instead reports to Kima. Carver is again partnered with Herc and the two investigate drug dealing around the docks area.

At one point, Herc and Carver buy a covert listening device and insert it into a tennis ball. However it is destroyed when it is unknowingly picked up and thrown into traffic. To cover their mistake, they have Herc's cousin pose as a fabricated confidential informant named "Fuzzy Dunlop". However, they establish a link between Nick Sobotka and drug trade near the docks.

Like the last detail, Herc and Carver again are relied upon to do the leg work for the detail and are instrumental in placing satellite tracking devices on vehicles involved in the dock smuggling ring. Their low status in the detail is brought home to them when they are asked to install an air conditioner in the home of a judge approving the detail's wiretaps. After being left out in the rain waiting for Nick Sobotka to return home, despite his having already turned himself in, Herc convinces Carver that they will never be respected in Daniels' unit.

Angered by the menial work given to him, Carver tells Daniels that he wishes to leave the unit. Daniels attempts to convince him to stay, pointing out that surveillance is part of the job. However, Carver leaves the unit and takes a DEU (Drug Enforcement Unit) sergeant posting in the Western District for Major Howard "Bunny" Colvin, where his rank is recognized and he can engage in more "rip and run". Herc follows in Carver's steps, also having no interest in doing menial surveillance work for Daniels.

=== Season 3 ===
Herc and Carver return to Narcotics and work in the Western District under Major Colvin. Carver commands the district's Drugs Enforcement Unit – a squad of plainclothes police officers dedicated to drug arrests, composed of Herc, Kenneth Dozerman, Lloyd "Truck" Garrick and Anthony Colicchio. He fails to learn a valuable lesson from his work with Kima – a police officer is only as good as their informants – as he fails to secure any CIs for his unit and has none to present to Major Colvin. Dozerman is subsequently shot and injured while under Carver's command in a failed buy-bust sting operation.

Carver later is responsible for policing "Hamsterdam", Colvin's unsanctioned free drug trade zone created in response to Dozerman's shooting. He is distressed by the consequences of the new zone – putting young hoppers out of work. Carver's solution is to tax the drug dealers, providing an informal "welfare" system for the unemployed hoppers. With Dennis "Cutty" Wise, a (now reformed) former soldier in Avon Barksdale's crew, he helps divert the young hoppers into boxing and basketball programs, that have some success until the "Hamsterdam" project is shut down. After this Carver and Cutty hold a mutual respect for each other having worked together with these children.

Over the season, Carver's DEU team are shown to be making statistically motivated arrests rather than performing real police work and building serious cases. Early in the season, Carver is criticized by Kima and McNulty for his lack of informants, and when asked by Colvin for descriptions of gang members and mid-level drug dealers, Carver is unable to provide any information. Before his forced retirement, Colvin criticizes Carver's work as an investigator and tells him he was not doing his job properly.

He urges Carver to get to know the area he is policing rather than treating it as hostile territory in a war zone. Colvin feels that this was one of the reasons behind Dozerman's shooting and then claims that Carver's stat-based arrests are of little use to the district without adequate information about what really goes on in the neighborhood.

=== Season 4 ===
Carver maintains his position as DEU Sergeant but "turns over a new leaf" in light of Major Colvin's advice. He begins cultivating street-level informants and amassing a working knowledge of the drug dealers in his district. When Prez asks that a police officer be sent to Randy's house confidentially, Daniels, Colvin's replacement as Western District commander, elects to send Carver, telling the surprised Prez that "Ellis has come a long way."

In particular, he targets Bodie as a potential informant because he is now working independently after the collapse of the Barksdale organization in Season 3. Carver is on relatively good terms with Bodie, as his first line in the season is "Where's the love, Bodie?" The two have a running joke of addressing each other formally. Colichio, however, is entirely unable to see the funny side, although Carver points out he can't go round beating the entire world up because "who are you gonna talk to when the shit happens?".

When Herc catches Mayor Royce receiving a blowjob from his secretary, Carver helps him out of a jam by setting up a meeting between Herc and the political-savvy Valchek. Carver also tries to help Bunk Moreland find a suspect in the murder of Fruit. The suspect is Bodie's second-in-command, Curtis "Lex" Anderson, and Carver knows which corner he works. However, Lex has not been seen for some time, having been killed by Chris Partlow and Snoop on Marlo Stanfield's orders.

Carver spots a group of children from his district with a stolen car and rather than chasing them on foot – he is taking Herc, dressed in suit and tie for mayoral protection duty, to see Valchek – he calls in the theft and elects to find the children later, as he knows where they hang out. When he returns he gives them a warning, telling them that he knows their names and addresses and if he learns that they are involved with stolen cars again he will arrange alleyway beatings for each of them. Donut waits until Carver has left before commenting on his "nice wheels".

He has an unmarked car put outside Randy Wagstaff's house when neighborhood kids start harassing him after he is labelled as a snitch. However, when the car leaves to respond to a fake Signal-13 call which was placed to lure the officers away, his house is set on fire with Molotov cocktails and Randy's foster mother is severely burned to the point of being unable to care for Randy. Carver is concerned for Randy, even offering to be Randy's foster parent when it becomes apparent that he will be sent to a group home. His offer is rejected due to the lengthy screening process involved, and after dropping Randy off at his group home, Carver angrily beats on his car horn, frustrated that he could not have done more.

=== Season 5 ===
Carver is acting as Western District SIC (Sergeant in Charge) - he has the responsibilities of the district's deputy major for most shifts. The district's officers are outraged by the city's financial cutbacks and their morale is at rock bottom. Carver faces dissent and abuse in his roll-call briefing and is told there is no point breaking up a fight between officers that occurs in the parking lot. Carver meets up with his old partner Thomas "Herc" Hauk, Kenneth Dozerman and Anthony Colicchio for drinks. Herc has been discharged from the department and is now working as a Private Investigator for defense attorney Maurice Levy. Herc has the detectives get information from within the department for him.

Colicchio is later involved in an assault on a teacher. Carver, having witnessed the event and seeing that Colicchio acted irrationally, offers to help Colicchio prepare a statement for the subsequent Internal Investigations Division case but finds Colicchio completely unrepentant. He decides that he cannot allow Colicchio's behavior to continue and writes Colicchio up for charges of conduct unbecoming an officer. Colicchio calls Carver a "rat" but Carver is willing to accept the resentment of his subordinate officers.

Later, over drinks, Herc tries to plead leniency for Colicchio. Carver explains his philosophy that all of their actions as police officers matter and reminds Herc of some of their mistakes. Carver specifically mentions Herc's actions with Randy Wagstaff. Herc accepts responsibility and tells Carver to do what he feels he has to.

Carver is later seen assisting Jimmy McNulty in finding McNulty's fabricated "homeless killer." McNulty has Carver instead investigate Marlo Stanfield's drug organization under the overtime detail of the "homeless killer." Carver's officers are able to use rental vehicles to follow Lester Freamon's lead in finding the source of drug distribution amongst Stanfield crew members.

When Kima Greggs questions Carver about the "homeless killer", he claims that he is happy to see his officers doing real police work and getting paid overtime for it. This is shared by his men, who are noticeably buoyed up by the news of some "rented wheels." At the end of the series, Commissioner Daniels, in one of his last acts as a police officer, promotes Carver to Lieutenant, saying "I'm glad I got to do this at least."

Carver's development in the series and his ending draws comparisons to Daniels; both men had skimmed drug money early in their career, both had matured from these experiences over time and both eventually climbed the police ranks as respected, hard-working and honest policemen, with Carver representing the next generation of this type of officer. Carver's character arc is in stark contrast to that of his early companion Herc; while both began the series as similar types of officers, Carver became a righteous and worthy policeman, while Herc abandoned all morality to aid and abet extremely dangerous criminals.

== Reception ==
Salon described Carver and Herc as providing needed comic relief to the show and acting as a bickering couple.
