= Proposition Joe =

Character from The Wire

Joseph Stewart
- The Wire character
- Robert F. Chew as Proposition Joe
- First appearance: "Game Day" (2002)
- Last appearance: "Transitions" (2008)
- Created by: David Simon
- Portrayed by: Robert F. Chew

In-universe information
- Nicknames: Proposition Joe, Prop Joe
- Gender: Male
- Occupation: Drug kingpin Appliance store operator
- Relatives: Melvin "Cheese" Wagstaff (nephew); Drac (nephew); Randy Wagstaff (great nephew)

Joseph Stewart, better known as "Proposition Joe" or "Prop Joe", is a fictional character on the HBO drama The Wire, played by Robert F. Chew. Joe is an Eastside drug lord who prefers a peaceful solution to business disputes when possible. He is responsible for creating the lucrative New Day Co-Op with Stringer Bell, supplying much of Baltimore with heroin brought into the city by "The Greeks". Displaying a cunning, business-oriented demeanor, Joe is often a match in stature for rival drug lords Avon Barksdale and Marlo Stanfield, and is able to manipulate most situations to his advantage.

His nickname stems from his trademark phrase, "I've got a proposition for you", going back to his days selling test answers on the schoolyard. Along with Poot Carr, Wee-Bey Brice, Omar Little, and Bubbles, he is one of the few characters from the drug trade to appear in every season.

== Biography ==
=== Season 1 ===
Joe first appears at an annual basketball game between the Eastside Projects' team and the Westside Projects'. Joe plays on Avon Barksdale's pride, goading him into doubling their wager on the outcome, then bringing in a ringer at the last minute to win the game.

That same day, Joe is visited by stick-up-man Omar Little, who gives Joe some of the Barksdale Organization's stolen narcotics in exchange for Barksdale's pager number. Omar uses the information in an unsuccessful attempt on Barksdale's life, but Joe's role in Omar's attack is never revealed to Barksdale. Joe later serves as a neutral go-between, organizing a meeting between Barksdale's business partner Stringer Bell and Omar to discuss a truce.

=== Season 2 ===
In season 2, Joe's role is expanded, and it is revealed that Joe relies on the Greek's smuggling ring to supply him with heroin through the Baltimore ports. Joe says that he still has to source his cocaine from New York, as the Greeks only deal in heroin. Joe accommodates Nick Sobotka at the request of Sergei "Serge" Malatov to resolve a dispute over a bad drug deal between Ziggy Sobotka and Joe's nephew and lieutenant Calvin "Cheese" Wagstaff. Out of respect for Malatov, Joe resolves the dispute in Nick's favour by compensating him for Ziggy's destroyed car (minus the amount owed to Cheese), but warns him to stay away in the future.

Joe's heroin supply is the purest in Baltimore, but he lacks the territory to maximize profits. Due to Avon Barksdale's arrest, the Barksdale Organization is cut off from their Dominican suppliers and is forced to sell weaker heroin. At D'Angelo Barksdale's funeral, Joe offers Stringer Bell a portion of his product in exchange for the right to deal drugs in some of the Barksdale-controlled towers. Barksdale vehemently rejects the idea, but Bell secretly agrees, and Cheese's crew moves into part of what was exclusively Barksdale territory.

Barksdale is unaware of Bell's move and brings in Brother Mouzone to protect the towers. Mouzone confronts Cheese and wounds him with a non-fatal gunshot. Joe fears Mouzone's reputation and knows it is a mistake to attack him directly, so Joe sets up a meeting between Bell and Omar Little, and Bell tricks Omar into shooting Mouzone. This elaborate deception achieves Joe and Bell's shared goals: it drives Mouzone back to New York and forces Barksdale to grudgingly agree to the drugs-for-territory exchange with arch-rival Joe.

=== Season 3 ===
Joe insulates himself against police investigation by maintaining a strict policy of only meeting face to face. His nephew "Drac" is targeted as a potential inroad for an investigation by Lieutenant Cedric Daniels' Major Crimes Unit because Drac is prone to talk business over the phone. Daniels' unit arrests Joe's lieutenant Lavelle Mann in an undercover bust operation, hoping Drac would be promoted to replace him. However, Joe chooses someone more reliable, thwarting the unit's efforts inadvertently.

Daniels tips his hand when he arrests Cheese, believing he had Cheese on tape discussing a murder. Cheese realizes the tape is of him talking about shooting his injured pet dog, and the police are forced to release him.

Cheese reports the incident to Joe who, now forewarned about the investigation and wiretap, passes the information on to Stringer Bell. The unit moves their investigation away from Joe and onto the more violent Kintel Williamson when they fail to make further progress.

Joe extends the sharing of his supply to many other drug dealers in Baltimore, forming the New Day Co-Op with Bell, Ricardo "Fat-Face Rick" Hendrix and Kintell Williamson, among others. Joe supplies these drug dealers with his package, and they receive a discount for the bulk buying; they also agree to avoid attracting unnecessary police attention by limiting violence. As a result, Williamson stops killing people, and the police begin investigating a brewing turf war between Avon Barksdale and up-and-coming Marlo Stanfield.

Joe and the rest of the Co-Op object to the police attention the war creates, as it interferes with their business. Joe meets with Stanfield's advisor Vinson to try to negotiate a settlement, but Stanfield is unwilling to back out of the war, believing that Barksdale is weak. Joe gives Bell an ultimatum: end the war, or he will be thrown out of the Co-Op. The ultimatum is defused when Bell is murdered and Barksdale is arrested, leaving Joe with complete control of the Co-Op.

=== Season 4 ===
Joe recruits former Barksdale Organization soldier Slim Charles as his lieutenant to supply the independent dealers who arose to replace the Barksdale organization in Western Baltimore. However, problems arise; Marlo Stanfield has taken control of much of the Barksdales' prime territory, and the New York drug organizations are taking over territory in Eastern Baltimore. The co-op votes to negotiate with Stanfield and recruit him to strike back against the New York drug dealers.

Joe contacts Stanfield, who turns down his first offer. Joe manipulates Omar Little again, inducing him to rob a card game which Stanfield attends, by pretending that he wanted to make amends for his involvement in the Stringer Bell/Brother Mouzone incident. After Omar robs the card game, Joe offers Stanfield another meeting and claims he could protect him against such surprises in the future.

Joe also explains that he has contacts in the Baltimore police department and courts. Joe routinely shares information about police activity with other Co-Op members. Although much of his information is actually public record, Joe is also aware of the investigation of Kintel Williamson that was suspended and inconclusive.

Stanfield agrees to work with the co-op, and with his help, the New York dealers are driven out of Baltimore. Joe also offers Stanfield advice on how to deal with a police surveillance camera, discovers the identity of the unit investigating Stanfield, and tries to encourage Stanfield's transition into being less violent and more business-minded.

Stanfield frames Omar for murder and plans to have him killed while in prison. Omar escapes the charges and plots revenge on Stanfield. Omar forces Joe (at gunpoint) to agree to betray Stanfield, but Omar ultimately double-crosses Joe and steals an entire co-op shipment as it is delivered.

The co-op decides that Joe should cover the expense of replacing it, and Joe threatens to cut them off from his supplier, forcing them to back down. Omar returns to sell the shipment back to Joe for 20 cents on the dollar; Joe, ever the opportunist, informs the Co-Op that the price is 30 cents on the dollar, allowing Joe to not only recoup his losses from the theft, but also turn a profit.

Stanfield is perturbed by the robbery and suspects that Cheese, who was responsible for collecting the shipment, was involved. To protect his nephew Joe is forced to reveal his suppliers' identity and arrange for Stanfield to meet with Spiros "Vondas" Vondopoulos. At the end of the season, Joe and the rest of the New Day Co-Op resume business as usual, but have put a bounty on Omar's head.

=== Season 5 ===
Season 5 opens over a year later. Joe's advice has allowed Marlo Stanfield to avoid prosecution despite an ongoing Major Case Unit investigation. Joe finds that he is losing territory in the redevelopment and gentrification of Eastern Baltimore, and he proposes a division of new territory in Baltimore County to compensate the Eastside drug dealers. Stanfield objects and then sows the seed of dissent in Joe's organization by suggesting that Joe should allow Joe's lieutenants to manage the new territory.

Stanfield approaches Joe for assistance both with money laundering and obtaining literally clean bills. Joe claims that he is happy to help and puts Stanfield in touch with several of his contacts.

Joe uses a pastor with charitable organizations abroad to launder money; Joe makes "donations" to the charities and then receives 90% of his funds back as cashier's checks. Joe introduces Stanfield to the pastor, explains how the scheme works, and - since Stanfield wants to actually see his laundered money - offers to get Stanfield a passport, so he can check on the deposits in offshore accounts. But privately Joe describes "civilizing" Stanfield as an ongoing uphill struggle.

Stanfield also requests clean bills from Joe and is accommodated, free of charge. Joe is unaware that Stanfield is using the money to pay tribute to The Greek and is plotting to usurp Joe's supply connection.

Stanfield also hopes to get revenge on the elusive Omar Little. Joe believes that he has escaped further involvement with Omar, and despite Stanfield's offering a bounty on anyone connected to Omar, Joe does not reveal Omar's connection to Butchie. However, Cheese betrays Joe for the reward money, and Stanfield has his enforcers murder Butchie.

Joe fears reprisal from Omar and decides to leave town. He arranges for Slim Charles to watch Cheese closely, as he suspects his nephew's betrayal. Joe arranges flowers for Butchie's funeral both as a gesture to his friend and to signal to Omar his innocence in the murder.

Cheese has created a feud with Co-Op kingpin Hungry Man over the new county territory, and Joe publicly reprimands his nephew. Stanfield gets the agreement of The Greek that he will consider him an insurance policy if Joe is unable to continue to handle their supply. Stanfield then seizes on Cheese's feud with Hungry Man to convince Cheese to betray his uncle. Cheese gives Joe up as Joe is packing to leave town. Stanfield corners Joe in his home, and Joe correctly guesses that Cheese betrayed him. Stanfield rejects Joe's final proposition to disappear quietly and has Chris Partlow shoot Joe while he watches.

Joe went to school at Dunbar High School with former Police Commissioner Ervin Burrell. Joe tells this to Herc, who is now working for Maury Levy, and that Burrell was "stone stupid" and in the glee club.

== Production ==
Actor Robert F. Chew appeared in David Simon's previous series Homicide: Life on the Street, in the three-part episode "Blood Ties", playing Wilkie Collins, a drug kingpin who hates violence. Collins provides the police with key information about which drug dealer was shooting at them so that the police would not interfere with his business. Collins and his wife are murdered by the Mahoney drug cartel for his betrayal. His young son witnesses their deaths and helps the police arrest their murderer. Chew also had a small role in Simon's HBO mini-series The Corner, in which he played a shoe salesman.
