= The Target (The Wire) =

- The Wire episode
- Episode no.: Season 1 Episode 1
- Directed by: Clark Johnson
- Story by: David Simon; Ed Burns
- Teleplay by: David Simon
- Original air date: June 2, 2002
- Running time: 62 minutes

Episode chronology
← Previous —	Next → "The Detail"
- The Wire season 1

"The Target" is the series premiere of the American police drama The Wire. It debuted on June 2, 2002, on HBO in the United States. The episode was written by David Simon from a story by Simon and Ed Burns and was directed by Clark Johnson. The story focuses on Baltimore Police Detective Jimmy McNulty setting his sights on Stringer Bell and Avon Barksdale's drug-dealing organization as the target of an investigation.

Nearly 3.7 million viewers watched "The Target" on its debut. Critical reception was largely positive, with praise for the writing, character development, and exploration of a police department's workings.

== Plot summary ==
Baltimore homicide detective Jimmy McNulty investigates the murder of Omar "Snot Boogie" Betts, a "rip and run" kid who was shot while attempting to rob a back alley craps game. An eyewitness describes to McNulty the illogical, but to that point accepted, pattern of the regulars allowing Snot Boogie to join the game each week, knowing in advance he would rob it, followed by their chasing him down to beat him and retrieve their money. McNulty, "in exchange for some Grape Nehi and a few Newports", persuades the witness to testify in court.

The following day, McNulty observes the trial of D'Angelo Barksdale, a young drug dealer charged with killing a low-ranking gang member. Witness William Gant is testifying in court and points out D'Angelo as the culprit. But the other witness, a security guard named Nakeesha Lyles, changes her story on the stand and refuses to identify D'Angelo, resulting in an acquittal. McNulty vents his frustration to Judge Daniel Phelan about the Baltimore Police Department's failure to investigate D'Angelo's uncle, Avon Barksdale, and his right-hand man Stringer Bell, who are major players in West Baltimore's drug trade. Phelan makes a call to Deputy Commissioner Ervin Burrell. Later, Major William Rawls, incensed that McNulty went around the chain of command, forces him to write a report for Burrell about the Barksdale murders. Sergeant Jay Landsman warns McNulty that his behavior could end with reassignment. He asks where McNulty would not want to be reassigned, and McNulty admits dreading being posted to the harbor patrol unit.

Wee-Bey Brice drives D'Angelo to Wendell "Orlando" Blocker's strip club, a front for the Barksdale Organization. When D'Angelo discusses the trial in Wee-Bey's car, Wee-Bey curtly reminds him not to discuss business in the car or on the phone, in case either is being monitored. Avon chides D'Angelo for committing a needless public murder, costing the organization time, effort and money. D'Angelo also meets a stripper called Shardene Innes. When D'Angelo arrives at the high-rise Franklin Terrace housing projects, Stringer tells him he has been demoted to heading a crew in the low-rise projects, dubbed "the Pit". This new crew includes Bodie Broadus, Poot Carr and young Wallace.

Narcotics lieutenant Cedric Daniels is tasked by Burrell with organizing a detail to investigate the Barksdales. Burrell wants to keep the investigation quick and simple, appeasing Phelan without becoming drawn into a protracted case. Daniels brings narcotics detectives Kima Greggs, Thomas "Herc" Hauk and Ellis Carver with him. Rawls sends McNulty and Michael Santangelo, one of Homicide's more inept detectives. McNulty's FBI contact, Agent Terrance "Fitz" Fitzhugh, shows him the Bureau's far superior surveillance equipment but explains that their drug investigations are winding down due to the War on Terror. McNulty objects to Daniels' plan of "buy-busts" and suggests using a wiretap to get a conviction. However, Daniels insists on a fast-paced investigation, suggesting that the detail look over old murders tied to the Barksdales.

McNulty goes drinking with his Homicide partner Bunk Moreland and complains about his ex-wife, who makes it difficult for him to see his two sons. Greggs returns home to her partner Cheryl. A heroin addict called Bubbles and his protege, Johnny Weeks, buy drugs with counterfeit money, but when they try to repeat the scam, Bodie leads the crew in beating Johnny. Bubbles is also a confidential informant for Greggs and agrees to give her information on the Barksdales as revenge for the beating. At the start of his second day working the Pit, D'Angelo is shocked to find the murdered body of William Gant, the witness at his trial who had identified him, lying in the street.

== Production ==
=== Epigraph ===
...when it's not your turn – McNulty

This line is taken from a conversation in which McNulty criticizes his colleague Bunk Moreland for taking on a homicide case that he could have avoided – it not being his turn in the rotation to take the next case. Bunk took the case because he knew the corpse was found in a house, which statistically gave him a much better chance of solving the case than if the victim had been found outdoors. The conversation is ironic since McNulty has broken the rules in a much more serious fashion by circumventing the chain of command.

=== Commentary ===
The DVD release featured a commentary track recorded by creator and writer/producer David Simon. Simon discusses the season's novelistic structure and the theme of the corrupting influence of the institutions that the characters have committed to. He mentions many real-life inspirations for events and characters on the show.

He discusses the technique of using surveillance methods within shots (TV monitors, security cameras etc.) to give the sense of always being watched and a need to process the vast amount of information available to the show's detective characters. He also talks about trying to ground the show in realism by using only diegetic music.

Throughout the commentary, Simon tries to distinguish The Wire from other television crime dramas. He makes the point that the detectives are motivated not by a desire to protect and serve but by the intellectual vanity of believing they are smarter than the criminals they are chasing.

At the end of the episode, when the body of Gant is found, there is a brief flashback to the trial, re-identifying the character for the audience. David Simon cites it as one of the few things HBO urged them to do, to make sure audiences recognized the character. Although Simon concedes that 'maybe they were right', he says that they were reluctant to put it in as it broke from the style of the show. The show's storytelling has been entirely linear ever since.

=== Non-fictional elements ===
Both the Snot Boogie murder story and Bunk's tale of shooting a mouse in his kitchen are anecdotes from Simon's time researching his non-fiction book Homicide: A Year on the Killing Streets (1991). A real police officer named Jay Landsman is also a character in the book.

Reviewers have noted the pilot's grounding in the non-fiction political climate. The San Francisco Chronicle commented that the show had forecast a reduction of the FBI's attention to the war on drugs because of the competing War on Terror. Simon confirms that the pilot was shot only a few weeks after 9/11, but that the writers correctly predicted what the FBI's response would be.

=== Locations ===
Much of the episode was filmed in West Baltimore. The scenes set at Orlando's gentleman's club were filmed at the Ritz Cabaret in Fells Point.

=== Credits ===
==== Starring cast ====
The credited starring cast consists of Dominic West (Jimmy McNulty), John Doman (William Rawls), Idris Elba (Stringer Bell), Frankie Faison (Ervin Burrell), Larry Gilliard, Jr. (D'Angelo Barksdale), Wood Harris (Avon Barksdale), Deirdre Lovejoy (Assistant State's Attorney Rhonda Pearlman), Wendell Pierce (Bunk Moreland), Lance Reddick (Cedric Daniels), Andre Royo (Bubbles), and Sonja Sohn (Kima Greggs).

==== Guest stars ====
- Peter Gerety as Judge Daniel Phelan
- Seth Gilliam as Detective Ellis Carver
- Domenick Lombardozzi as Detective Thomas "Herc" Hauk
- Leo Fitzpatrick as Johnny
- J. D. Williams as Preston "Bodie" Broadus
- Hassan Johnson as Roland "Wee-Bey" Brice
- Michael B. Jordan as Wallace
- Clayton LeBouef as Wendell "Orlando" Blocker
- Melanie Nicholls-King as Cheryl
- Doug Olear as FBI Special Agent Terrance "Fitz" Fitzhugh
- Delaney Williams as Sergeant Jay Landsman
- Richard De Angelis as Major Raymond Foerster
- Wendy Grantham as Shardene Innes
- Michael Kostroff as Maurice Levy
- Michael Salconi as Detective Michael Santangelo
- Ingrid Cornell as Nakeesha Lyles
- Larry Hull as William Gant
- Lucy Newman-Williams as Assistant State's Attorney Taryn Hansen
- Michael Stone Forrest as Detective Frank Barlow

The episode introduces many characters who are important over the course of the series, despite only being credited as guest stars. Domenick Lombardozzi plays Herc. Leo Fitzpatrick plays homeless, hapless drug addict Johnny Weeks. Hassan Johnson plays criminal enforcer Wee-Bey Brice. Michael B. Jordan plays naive sixteen-year-old drug dealer Wallace. Melanie Nicholls-King plays Detective Greggs' domestic partner Cheryl. Doug Olear plays FBI Special Agent Terrence "Fitz" Fitzhugh. Richard DeAngelis plays Major Raymond Foerster. Wendy Grantham plays stripper Shardene Innes. Michael Kostroff plays defense lawyer Maurice Levy. Michael Salconi plays Detective Michael Santangelo.

Reviewers have noted that several actors appearing in the series have previously appeared in Homicide: Life on the Street and Oz. In addition to Doman, Reddick, Harris, and Lombardozzi, Oz alumni include Seth Gilliam (Ellis Carver) and J. D. Williams (Bodie Broadus). Peter Gerety (Judge Phelan) and Clayton LeBouef (Orlando) were both major characters on Homicide, on which Delaney Williams (Sgt. Jay Landsman) had also appeared. This episode was the first of several directed by Clark Johnson, also an alumnus of Homicide. The Corner star Larry Hull appears as maintenance man and witness William Gant.

== Broadcast ==
The episode debuted on HBO in the U.S. on June 2, 2002. The episode debuted in the UK on January 12, 2005, on FX. BBC Two broadcast this episode for the first time on UK broadcast television on March 30, 2009.

== Reception ==
=== Ratings ===
On its U.S. debut, "The Target" had 3.7 million viewers on HBO. In the UK, BBC Two's first run of this episode on March 30, 2009, had nearly 600,000 viewers.

=== Critical reception ===
For The Baltimore Sun, David Zurawik saw similarities early in "The Target" with Simon's previous show Homicide: Life on the Street but then a key difference: While Homicide focuses on the police, The Wire shows both the police and criminals as "soldiers in a meaningless war [who] share a moment of understanding about life on the trenches." Similarly, Charlie McCollum of the San Jose Mercury News rated the show three and a half out of four stars, commenting that this episode "is choppy and full of seemingly disconnected scenes and characters", along with "smart, insightful bits of dialogue".

Ben Marshall of The Guardian noted the pilot episode established the series' themes of institutional dysfunction, the ineffectiveness of the war on drugs and novelistic structure. The review compared the series to Richard Price's 1992 novel Clockers and wondered if the pace could be sustained for an entire season. The review picked out the characters of Jimmy and Avon as particularly significant. Ken Tucker of Entertainment Weekly praised Johnson's direction of the episode and credited him with drawing subtle performances out of Gerety and Reddick.

Tim Goodman of the San Francisco Chronicle characterized the show as another success for the HBO network and a well-produced and complex subversion of the cops and robbers genre. He credited Simon's reporter's eye for detail for the series' verisimilitude. He also noted the series themes of institutional dysfunction, the ineffectiveness of the war on drugs, and novelistic structure. A separate Chronicle article highlighted the theme of institutional dysfunction through the comparable experience of characters on opposite sides of the law using Jimmy and D'Angelo as examples. The review also made favorable comparisons between the show and Simon's previous work on Homicide: Life on the Street, attributing the improvement to the switch to cable television for The Wire from the NBC network who produced Homicide.

Other reviews were more negative. For The Washington Post, Tom Shales said the show was "well written and powerfully performed, but...also infused with a contagious hopelessness." Shales also believed the show to be "almost ludicrous in its excess of profane and raunchy talk". Rob Owen of the Pittsburgh Post-Gazette stated that the producers' expectations that the audience would have the patience for a complex, morally ambiguous, and slowly unfolding story might prove unfounded. They noted the cast members from Homicide and Oz and described The Wire as less accessible than either of these shows and also compared the pacing to Farscape. They praised the performances of some of the cast and said that the show had moments that drew the viewer in but ultimately required too much of its audience. The New York Times also felt that the show "went out of its way to be choppy and confusing" and eschewed conventions of signposting the introduction of characters and obvious exposition but commented that while some viewers may be alienated others would find this refreshing. They noted the theme of institutional dysfunction and the use of parallel storylines for characters in different organizations to highlight this, citing the pariah status of Jimmy and D'Angelo. The review also criticized the show's attempts at realistic dialogue, saying that it often seemed self-conscious, and the examination of the detectives' personal lives, saying that it had been done before. The review stated that the show's success would hinge not on its apparent high quality but on the tolerance of the viewer for the complexity of the continuing narrative, which they characterized as considerably more downbeat than high-octane shows like 24.

The opening scene at the Snot Boogie crime scene has been praised as being a "perfectly crafted set-up" for the series' themes of institutional dysfunction, devaluing human life, and epitomizing the bleak humor of the show.
