= Bunk Moreland =

Character from The Wire

William Moreland
- The Wire character
- Wendell Pierce as Bunk Moreland
- First appearance: "The Target" (2002)
- Last appearance: "–30–" (2008)
- Created by: David Simon
- Portrayed by: Wendell Pierce

In-universe information
- Alias: Bunk
- Gender: Male
- Title: Detective
- Occupation: Baltimore Police Department Homicide unit detective
- Spouse: Nadine
- Children: Three (two sons, one daughter)

William "Bunk" Moreland is a fictional character in The Wire, played by Wendell Pierce. Bunk's character is based on a retired Baltimore detective named Oscar "The Bunk" Requer. He is portrayed as a generally competent, if profane and curmudgeonly detective. Like his best friend Jimmy McNulty, he also has problems related to infidelity and alcohol abuse, although he is more mindful than McNulty of the department's chain of command.

== Casting ==
According to series creator David Simon, Pierce was cast immediately after completing his audition for the part. In Jonathan Abrams' book All the Pieces Matter, about the process of making The Wire, Simon described Pierce's state of mind at the audition: "He was really pissed off. He had gotten in an argument with a cab driver. It was one of those sort of trying-to-hail-a-cab-while-black moments in New York, and he came in and he was steaming."

Although he tried to apologize for being upset, the casting staff felt his attitude was perfect for a stressed-out Baltimore homicide detective. Pierce was not aware of the rationale until much later. He described feeling somewhat indignant upon learning about it, but told Abrams, "The fact that I would bring it up in the middle of a major audition shows some gumption on my part."

Lance Reddick, who was later cast as Cedric Daniels, was originally called in to audition for Moreland.

== Character storyline ==
Bunk attended Edmondson High School in West Baltimore, where he played lacrosse well enough to make the all-city team. He lives in Randallstown, a predominantly African-American suburb, with his wife Nadine and three children. Bunk worked as a patrolman in Baltimore's Southwestern District before becoming a homicide detective. He is a frequent cigar smoker, and habitual drinker.

=== Season 1 ===
Bunk serves as Jimmy McNulty's lone ally in the Baltimore Police Department's Homicide Unit, informing him of its happenings while chiding him for getting involved in the Barksdale case. He is also the primary investigator for the murder of William Gant, who testified against D'Angelo Barksdale. Omar Little informs Bunk that the shooter is a Barksdale soldier called Bird and agrees to testify against Bird in court. Because of this, Bunk persuades his colleague Ray Cole not to arrest Omar for the murder of Stinkum, a Barksdale associate.

When Omar is at the police station, Bunk discovers they attended the same high school, beginning an ongoing association between the two. At Sergeant Jay Landsman's insistence, Bunk and McNulty review the Deirdre Kresson murder, which ultimately turns out to be related to the Barksdales and is solved as part of the final arrests of D'Angelo and Wee-Bey Brice.

=== Season 2 ===
With McNulty having been bumped out to the Marine Unit, Bunk is partnered with Lester Freamon, and they are quickly recognized as the most efficient detectives in Homicide. Landsman assigns them to investigate the deaths of fourteen Jane Does in a shipping container at the Port of Baltimore. They are detailed with Officer Beadie Russell from the Port Authority, who initially found the bodies. Bunk and Freamon track down the ship which carried the container and holds it in port in Philadelphia to question the crew.

The crew feign ignorance of the English language, and the detectives let the ship go after learning that two crewmen jumped ship after Baltimore. Based on a few sparse facts, Bunk and Freamon deduce that the women were prostitutes being smuggled from overseas, that one of the girls was murdered by a sailor after refusing him sex, and the rest were killed for witnessing the crime. The murderer is one of the crewmen who fled, leaving the investigation at an impasse. Bunk and Freamon come under heavy criticism from Colonel William Rawls for releasing the ship without getting statements.

While working the port case, Bunk worries about the William Gant murder; State's Attorney Ilene Nathan threatens to drop the charges if the police cannot find Omar. Bunk repeatedly reminds McNulty, who eventually finds Omar with help from Greggs' confidential informant Bubbles. Omar testifies, and Bird is imprisoned for a maximum term. Later, Bunk and Russell return to Philadelphia and find video evidence implicating Sergei Malatov, whose testimony leads to the solving of the Jane Doe murders and aids the Major Crimes Unit's investigation into stevedore union treasurer Frank Sobotka. After a fruitless raid on Gleka's store, Bunk and Freamon turn up to arrest him, finding out he was murdered several days before, giving the criminal organization under investigation time to clear out the store of incriminating information.

=== Season 3 ===
When the city deals with five homicides in one night, Bunk must leave his son with McNulty at an Orioles game. Bunk quickly recognizes the scene of Omar's drug robberies and mistakenly believes one of the shootout victims, Tosha Mitchell, was a civilian. He continues to investigate her death even after Landsman, Rawls, and Colonel Raymond Foerster order him to find the stolen weapon of Kenneth Dozerman, who was shot and nearly killed in a failed drug bust led by Sergeant Ellis Carver. The brass consider the weapon's recovery a top priority, but Bunk thinks it is a frivolous use of his abilities.

Bunk meets with Omar and confronts him about the "innocent" victim. Omar informs Bunk that she was part of his crew and says he would never kill an innocent person. In response to Omar's statement that no one will talk to Bunk about the murder, and Tosha died in the game, Bunk makes Omar feel guilty about his negative influence on the world due to the collapse of West Baltimore. Bunk says that predators like Omar are all that still exist in their old neighborhood, which was once a community despite its hardships. To assuage this guilt, Omar finds Dozerman's gun and returns it to Bunk.

Later, Bunk is one of the investigators of Stringer Bell's murder. Bunk realizes Omar was the shooter but does not close the case. Afterward, he tells McNulty that the city's homicide rate will probably reach 300 by New Year's, noticing how McNulty has slowed down on his consumption of alcohol.

=== Season 4 ===
Bunk investigates the murder of Fruit, one of Marlo Stanfield's drug dealers. He is unable to find his main suspect, Curtis "Lex" Anderson. It becomes clear that Lex was murdered, but his body is not found and no leads are forthcoming.

At the same time, Bunk is surprised at McNulty's seemingly successful attempts to get his life back on track. Omar contacts Bunk after Chris Partlow frames Omar for killing an innocent woman in a convenience store robbery. Bunk initially ignores him, but Omar appeals to his sense of honor. Bunk tracks down new evidence proving the witness in Omar's case, Old Face Andre, lied, leading to Omar's release. In exchange, Bunk extracts a promise from Omar to never kill again.

In the process, Bunk also manages to make an enemy out of Crutchfield, the detective assigned to the Andre case. The animosity of undoing Crutchfield's detective work backfires on Bunk, when Crutchfield does not pass on information from Ellis Carver, who was trying to protect an underaged informant who knew about Lex's disappearance and whose cooperation is exposed to the party involved by Hauk's incompetence. Freamon transfers back to Homicide and is partnered with Bunk again, when Carver chases up Lex's case with Bunk, he is angered at Hauk and vows to "skin" him. Freamon calms him down and they detail everything Hauk did, Freamon manages to find Lex's body and in the process, more than 20 other bodies, all of which are linked to Stanfield after Bunk gets key testimony from Lex's mother. They arrest Chris and Snoop but Hauk's stupidity, tipped them off and they dispose of the evidence throwing the lime and nailgun into the river.

=== Season 5 ===
Bunk and his colleagues in Homicide deal with budget cutbacks, including no overtime pay, until the city's financial situation resolves. The fiscal problems lead to the closure of the Major Case Unit and the reassignment of McNulty and assignment of Greggs to Landsman's squad. While investigating a probable overdose, McNulty tampers with the body and the crime scene to create the illusion of a serial killer, and Bunk leaves in disgust. Later, Bunk learns that McNulty is altering old case files in order to advance the deception. Bunk enlists Freamon to talk sense into McNulty, but this plan backfires when Freamon decides the plan could work and makes suggestions to improve it by sensationalizing the killer. When Landsman orders him to attend a meeting involving the serial killer, Bunk refuses.

Bunk refocuses his attention on the Stanfield murders and delivers a report to Landsman that is placed immediately into a desk drawer. Landsman points out that Bunk is simply changing the date while submitting essentially the same report. Bunk angrily asserts that he is forced to repeat his requests as he is still waiting for the crime lab to process evidence. Bunk finally gets a DNA match on Partlow for the unrelated murder of Michael Lee's stepfather, but agrees to delay his case in order to allow the Stanfield wiretap to continue. He is last seen investigating a homicide with Greggs, engaging in jovial conversation similar to that he used to share with McNulty.
