= Ervin Burrell =

Character from The Wire

Ervin H. Burrell
- The Wire character
- Frankie Faison as Ervin Burrell
- First appearance: "The Target" (2002)
- Last appearance: "Transitions" (2008)
- Created by: David Simon
- Portrayed by: Frankie Faison

In-universe information
- Gender: Male
- Occupation: Deputy Commissioner of Operations; Commissioner
- Spouse: Arlene

Ervin H. Burrell is a fictional character on the HBO drama The Wire, played by Frankie Faison. Burrell was an officer in the Baltimore Police Department who ascended from Deputy Commissioner of Operations to Commissioner over the course of the show.

== Biography ==
A careerist, Burrell believes in the Baltimore Police Department's chain of command and stores knowledge of corrupt activities by his subordinates to maintain his authority. Also a statistical bureaucrat, he cares more about reducing crime on paper than building strong cases. Conscious of the media coverage of the BPD, he is very sensitive to the newspaper headlines concerning its progress. Throughout the series, he struggles to direct the BPD to adequately reduce crime levels and constantly feuds with the city's politicians, some of whom blame him for the department's problems. Burell is shown to be a pragmatic manager, taking the blame for Political Administration in return for a full term and manipulative of subordinates offering promotion to Officers who prove they are loyal. Like Carver who provides information in return for a promotion.

Burrell attended Dunbar High School and was a member of the school's glee club. He was a year ahead of "Proposition Joe" Stewart, who described Burrell in high school as "stone stupid."

=== Season 1 ===
A Deputy Commissioner during season 1, Burrell aspires to become Commissioner, a post held by Warren Frazier. Primarily responsible for ensuring that the entire BPD obeys Frazier's directives, he consistently cares more about making good headlines instead of good cases.

When D'Angelo Barksdale beats a murder charge by buying off a witness, Burrell faces criticism from Judge Phelan over the BPD's failure to investigate D'Angelo's uncle Avon. Burrell hastily assembles a task force to placate Phelan, led by Lieutenant Cedric Daniels. From the beginning, Burrell is unsupportive of the unit, giving Daniels the worst officers available. He orders premature seizure raids that tip off the Barksdale Organization to the detail's efforts and prompts them to change their operating structure, hindering further investigation.

When the detail begins investigating donations from the Barksdale organization to local politicians, Burrell realizes the implications. He is also upset to find that the case is becoming prolonged and that the detail has set up wiretaps. The detail seizes Barksdale money being carried by a driver for corrupt State Senator Clay Davis, but Burrell orders Daniels to return the money to avoid embarrassing the senator. Burrell next orders the detail on an undercover operation, which ends with Detective Kima Greggs being shot. Burell takes the time to comfort Kima's girlfriend, who is distraught. The shooting prompts more involvement from Frazier who, along with Burrell, tries to project the image of a strong department to the public by ordering raids, seizing a large amount of narcotics and firearms.

In retaliation for the shooting, Burrell insists that Daniels' detail raid the Barksdales' main stash house, an act which causes them to stop using payphones — effectively nullifying the wiretaps. Burrell bribes Detective Ellis Carver with a promotion to sergeant in exchange for information from inside the detail. To force Daniels to meet his demands, Burrell threatens to revisit previous allegations of corruption from Daniels' days in the Eastern District's Drug Enforcement Unit.

Daniels calls Burrell's bluff and says he is ready to face the charges and cause bad press. When the Barksdale case ends, Burrell reassigns Daniels to evidence control as punishment for defying him. He also learns about Jimmy McNulty's disclosure of information to Phelan; he approves McNulty's reassignment to the harbor patrol unit as punishment. He is seen saluting a newly promoted Sergeant Carver.

=== Season 2 ===
With Frazier's retirement, Burrell is named Acting Commissioner of the BPD. With the support of Mayor Clarence Royce and most of the city's African-American political leaders, Burrell's appointment to Commissioner is made a certainty. Major Stanislaus Valchek, a Southeastern District commander with political connections, offers Burrell support from the dissenting first district in exchange for assembling an investigative detail against Frank Sobotka. Valchek is convinced that Sobotka, the local head of a stevedore union, is smuggling through the docks; he also holds a petty grudge against Sobotka.

Burrell gives Valchek six detectives for the new detail, and gives them six weeks to find evidence against Sobotka and the union. However, Burrell, seeing the investigation as worthless, gives Valchek the worst officers available, just as he had with Daniels. The disappointed Valchek is furious when his son-in-law, Detective Roland Pryzbylewski, tells him that Burrell interfered with the Barksdale case.

Valchek demands better officers, threatening to derail Burrell's bid for Commissioner; he specifically demands that Daniels lead the detail. Daniels demands a promotion, a specialized unit, and the selection of his own detectives to conduct the Sobotka case. Burrell agrees in order to appease Valchek. Daniels' detail proceeds to build a partially successful case against the union, mollifying Valchek. During a meeting with Daniels, Pearlman and Valchek he attempts to moderate Valchek when he is irate that nothing has been found, linking Sobotka to the smuggling operation.

=== Season 3 ===
As acting Commissioner, Burrell finds his actions hampered by the actions of key politicians at the mayor's office including mayor Royce and his chief political advisor who use Burrell as a scapegoat for failing to meet unrealistic expectations and being heavily criticized for orders he has successfully carried out often at their behest, mainly by Royce.

Burrell faces problems with councilman Tommy Carcetti, the head of the public safety subcommittee, and criticism of the BPD's failure to reduce crime statistics. Believing Carcetti will run against him and hoping to insulate himself against opponents by campaigning on declining crime rates, Royce orders Burrell to keep the annual murder rate below 275 and cause a 5% decrease in felonies citywide. Burrell works with Carcetti to prevent the BPD from looking worse at the public safety subcommittee meetings.

Carcetti offers Burrell more resources in exchange for inside information about Royce. Burrell accepts, as Royce provides little support to the BPD and forces Burrell to take all the blame for the department's problems. Carcetti continues to criticize the BPD over issues like witness protection but delivers on his promises to Burrell, who comes to see the councilman as an ally.

Burrell promotes Major William Rawls to fill his old position of Deputy Commissioner of Operations, but fails to promote Daniels as promised due to political conflicts involving Daniels' wife Marla, who is running for a council seat against Royce loyalist Eunetta Perkins. He does allow Daniels his own Major Crimes Unit and they return to investigating Avon Barksdale.

Meanwhile, Burrell and Rawls preside over weekly COMSTAT meetings where they pressure BPD district commanders to return the favorable crime rate figures that Royce demands. Burrell relieves Major Marvin Taylor as Eastern District Commander and threatens Western District Commander Major Howard "Bunny" Colvin when felonies rise 2% in his district.

Colvin responds by allowing drug dealing to continue unchecked in specific areas, causing the felony rate to drop, and conceals his strategy from his superiors, who suspect his statistics. Upon learning the truth, Burrell forces Colvin to take his vacation time immediately and informs Royce of the sanctioned drug dealing zones. Royce considers sustaining the initiative because of its positive effects.

Burrell and his commanders are hampered by city hall as Royce tries to take credit for the drug free zones as a social initiative when the crime rate drops because of the zones. Actively ignored by Royce, he thus decides to contact Carcetti to force action on the issue as Royce spends days with various experts on how the zones can be implemented and spun to boost his image. Knowing that Carcetti and Tony Gray are potential mayoral candidates, he plans to leak the story, place political pressure on Royce, finally dismantle the free zones and exploit the situation simultaneously.

When Royce shows signs of blaming the department, Burrell threatens to go to the press and blame City Hall for the potential fiasco by explaining he came to Royce weeks ago about the free zones but was not ordered to address them while Royce planned to use the zones for political benefit. Burrell then softens his tone by offering to take full responsibility for Colvin's actions provided that Royce makes him Commissioner for a full term.

Burrell has Rawls shut down Colvin's drug-tolerant zones soon after Royce caves to his demands. Aided by Internal Investigations Division commander Major Bobby Reed, he also demotes Colvin to Lieutenant and forces him to retire early. Colvin complies with Burrell's demands after Burrell threatens to involve the men under Colvin's command. Burrell humiliates him further by informing Johns Hopkins University of his misdeeds, costing him his retirement job with Campus Security.

Elsewhere, Daniels' Major Crimes Unit arrests Avon Barksdale just as the Colvin scandal hits, allowing Burrell to further divert media attention. Following the arrest, Burrell promotes Daniels to Major, who then takes Colvin's post as commander of the Western District.

=== Season 4 ===
Burrell is a key member of Royce's inner circle. Royce is outraged when the MCU begins serving subpoenas against key political figures without his knowledge. After a dressing down from Royce, Burrell promises to prevent any more surprises from his department. Burrell and Rawls agree to control the subpoenas by "proper supervision" of the MCU. This involves removing the lenient Lieutenant Jimmy Asher and replacing him with the hostile Lieutenant Charles Marimow.

After Burrell fails to bring a murdered witness to Royce's attention before it becomes a campaign issue, the Mayor orders Burrell to downplay the story to the press and take the political fallout on himself. Royce also instructs Burrell to slow the investigation down until after the election to prevent it being proved that the victim was a protected witness. Burrell orders Foerster to assign Greggs, now a rookie homicide detective, to the case. When the change in investigators is leaked to the press, Royce reprimands Burrell and implies to Rawls that he will be made Commissioner after the Mayor wins the Democratic primary. However, Royce loses to Carcetti, allowing Burrell to keep his job.

When Carcetti asks Burrell to resign, he tells the new Mayor that he would have to fire him and would not go quietly. Unable to find a suitable African-American replacement for Commissioner, Carcetti decides to strip Burrell of his power and give all decision making to Rawls, while leaving Burrell as a figurehead for the press and ministers. Burrell gets concerned when Carcetti orders the promotion of Daniels to Colonel and Criminal Investigations Division commander. Burrell is afraid that Carcetti plans to replace him with Daniels. With Daniels' promotion to Colonel after only a short time as Major, Burrell's future in the department becomes bleak.

Burrell proves himself a valuable political aide to Carcetti in handling racial profiling allegations against Herc, tricked by Bubbles into stopping a car driven by a black minister. He recommends the IID look deep into Herc's file because his time in Narcotics would probably show further poor conduct. Burrell also meets with Davis to discuss preventing Daniels' further advancement in the BPD, as Burrell has FBI information regarding Daniels' unexplained income in the Eastern District. Burrell warns Rawls never to cross him again, as Rawls' own hopes for promotion have been dashed by the political climate.

=== Season 5 ===
More than a year into Carcetti's term, Burrell is forced to deal with massive budget cuts despite the Mayor's pledge to improve funding for the BPD. However, he convinces Carcetti to lift the cap on secondary employment in order to bolster morale. Meanwhile, Davis faces a corruption investigation by the MCU, and appeals to Burrell for protection. Burrell is unable to do so, as Daniels commands both the MCU and the CID and is linked with Carcetti. Davis angrily threatens Burrell.

Valchek leaks increased crime statistics to Carcetti, hoping to usurp Burrell's position. However, Carcetti decides to accept his budget cuts have caused rising crime. However, Burrell delivers altered statistics to Carcetti, despite the Mayor's insistence on clean numbers. Carcetti finally has the political capital he needs to fire Burrell and leaks a story about a potential shake up in the BPD. Burrell is devastated upon reading the story, which relates that Carcetti will promote Rawls to temporary Acting Commissioner while Daniels is groomed for Deputy Commissioner.

Burrell plans to expose Daniels' alleged corruption, but city council president Nerese Campbell talks him into leaving quietly by promising him a lucrative replacement position. Burrell agrees to attend a press conference with Carcetti and to allow the transitions to proceed in order to secure his new job. In a rare humanizing moment when facing his departure, Burrell reveals his bitterness at having to accommodate interference and policy-making from City Hall throughout his career. He warns Rawls that he could expect the same treatment. Burell is last seen with acquitted senator Clay Davis eating in a diner, watching on as they witness Cedric Daniel's and Rhonda Pearlman's rise further into their respective careers.
