= Wallace (The Wire) =

Character from The Wire

- The Wire character
- Michael B. Jordan as Wallace
- First appearance: "The Target" (2002)
- Last appearance: "Cleaning Up" (2002)
- Created by: David Simon
- Portrayed by: Michael B. Jordan

In-universe information
- Gender: Male
- Occupation: Drug dealer for Barksdale Organization
- Date of birth: April 4, 1986
- Date of death: September 1, 2002 (aged 16)

Wallace is a character on the HBO drama The Wire, played by actor Michael B. Jordan. Wallace is a 16-year-old drug dealer for the Barksdale Organization, who works in the low-rise projects crew known as "The Pit" with his friends and fellow dealers Bodie and Poot. When information he provides leads to the brutal death of Brandon Wright, the boyfriend of stick-up artist Omar Little, Wallace feels guilty and tries to leave the drug trade. He informs on the Barksdale Organization to the police, and as a result he is killed by Bodie and Poot under orders from drug kingpin Stringer Bell.

== Biography ==
Wallace, born on April 4, 1986, is the son of Darcia Wallace. He is a 16-year-old drug dealer in the Barksdale crew's low rise projects organization (called "The Pit"). He serves with Poot and Bodie Broadus under D'Angelo Barksdale, through the entirety of season 1.

He shows the signs of a half-finished education: he can identify famous people on currency better than the rest of his crew (including D'Angelo, who objects when Wallace correctly points out that Alexander Hamilton was never president) but sometimes struggles with the math involved with drug dealing. He shows he is ill fitted with the more hardcore members, when he allows Bubbles and Johnny Weeks to slip him a fake note. He also takes responsibility for numerous younger kids in the projects, housing them in a squatter's apartment, packing their lunches, seeing them off to school, and helping them with their homework. He betrays his age when he is found playing with toys while supposed to be on lookout duty, resulting in Bodie throwing a glass at his head.

After Omar Little robs the pit crew's stash of drugs, Poot and Wallace spots Omar's accomplice Brandon playing pinball and calls this information in. Stringer Bell grabs Brandon and tortures him to death, with the aid of Bird, Stinkum and Wee Bey. His body is left on display, coincidentally outside of Wallace's home. Wallace is guilt ridden, with his role D'Angelo attempts to counsel him that a message needs to be sent, secretly agreeing with his misgivings about the murder. The only advice D'Angelo can give to his friend is "don't think about it".

Wallace receives a quarter of the $2,000 bounty on Brandon's head but is so sickened by the event that he decides he wants out of "the game". He approaches D'Angelo and tells him he wants to go back to school. D'Angelo gives Wallace his blessing and some cash. Poot discovers that Wallace has spent the money on drugs and is spending most of his time at home getting high to help with his PTSD from the murder.

Wallace is picked up by the police and agrees to cooperate with the Barksdale detail. He reveals Stringer's involvement in the killing of Omar's boyfriend Brandon. He also reveals a false tale D'Angelo told them after Bodie challenged him about a murder he unknowingly aided.

In order to keep Wallace safe until the trial, the detail sends him to live with his grandmother in rural Cambridge, Maryland. After detective Kima Greggs is shot in an undercover operation, the detail becomes so preoccupied with her condition that Wallace is temporarily forgotten. Bored with life away from Baltimore, he returns to the low-rise projects and asks to get involved in the trade again.

Stringer Bell becomes suspicious of Wallace's return. D'Angelo tries to reassure Stringer of Wallace's loyalty, but Stringer is not convinced and assigns Bodie to kill Wallace. Cornered at gunpoint by Poot and Bodie, Wallace begs for mercy, reminding Bodie of their friendship. Bodie first taunts Wallace, then hesitates, unable to bring himself to pull the trigger. Poot urges him on, and Bodie finally shoots Wallace, only to leave him wounded and dying from a chest wound. Poot takes the gun and finishes him off. ("Cleaning Up)".

D'Angelo is outraged when he learns of Wallace's death, which also means no charges against Stringer Bell, who is free to lead the Barksdale when Avon is arrested. It is one of the main factors that leads D'Angelo to want to leave "the game" himself, and it drives a permanent wedge between him and Stringer, after Stringer cannot answer "where's Wallace" during a prison visit and attempts to make a deal of his own. Despite taking the sentence, this is not enough and culminates in Stringer ordering D'Angelo to be murdered in prison - which in turn leads to Stringer and Avon Barksdale turning on each other when the former confesses his role, ending with Avon giving Stringer up for dead.

In season 3, McNulty finds the crime scene photo from Wallace's murder, and he and Roland Pryzbylewski share a look. Wallace's death is referenced in a debate by Poot and Bodie, during their conversation Poot does not see the difference between their actions and Marlo's from Bodie's corner boy Little Kevin's, who failed to follow orders. Bodie disagrees believing they Wallace's death was necessary, whereas he views Marlo's actions as unjust. This further his disdain and disillusionment with the Stansfield organisation and Marlo's leadership.

== Creation ==
He wants to be one of the "baddest drug dealers" but didn't know it would come with a price. He wants to have all the pleasure and all the money but didn't know that the residue of the drug dealing would come with it.

— Michael B. Jordan on Wallace

Michael B. Jordan auditioned before The Wire casting director Alexa Fogel in New York City for the role of Bodie. He was called back twice and the auditions went well, but he was turned down for the part because Fogel thought he was too young. The part went to Jordan's friend J. D. Williams, who grew up in the same hometown of Newark, New Jersey. Jordan was asked instead to audition for the younger character Wallace, and was cast in the part.

Jordan did little preparation for the part, but used his experiences growing up on the streets of Newark as a way to prepare for the role. Jordan said, "I live in an area where there are lots of drug dealers and I know some people who may or may not sell drugs, so this is not new to me." The actor found out his character was going to be killed one week before it was filmed.

Series creator David Simon has described Wallace as an emotional center to the show's first season and praised Jordan's performance, saying that he was sorry the character had to leave but that the story comes first. Simon sees the character as an illustration of the adage "a 16-year-old drug dealer is still 16."

== Reception ==
Amos Barshad of New York magazine called Wallace's death "one of an overwhelmingly bleak show's bleakest moments". MSNBC reporter Michael Ventre described it as "perhaps the most memorable (scene), and one that illustrates The Wire in microcosm."

The character remained memorable years after his departure from the show. During a January 2008 premiere party for the fifth season of The Wire, Simon read the names of every notable cast member in the show, and media outlets reported the loudest cheers came for Wallace.
