= Maurice Levy (The Wire) =

Character from The Wire

- The Wire character
- Michael Kostroff as Maurice Levy
- First appearance: "The Target" (2002)
- Last appearance: "–30–" (2008)
- Created by: David Simon
- Portrayed by: Michael Kostroff

In-universe information
- Alias: Maury
- Gender: Male
- Occupation: Attorney at law, defense attorney

Maurice J. "Maury" Levy is a fictional character in the HBO drama The Wire, played by Michael Kostroff. He is a skilled defense attorney and was kept on retainer by the Barksdale Organization, later by Proposition Joe and ultimately by the Stanfield Organization. He represented members of his clients' organizations at various criminal trials, advising them on defense strategy on charges such as drug trafficking, murder, and criminal possession of a weapon, as well as parole negotiation. He also acted and advised for Barksdale Organization's front organizations and Stringer Bell's real estate business. Levy is corrupt and unscrupulous, willing to aid his clients in furtherance of their criminal activity.

== Biography ==
Levy is the managing partner of Levy and Weinstein, Attorneys at Law, with office located on Lombard Street in Downtown Baltimore. They act as the resident agent for Barksdale Organization's front organizations' corporate charters, such as B & B Enterprise, B-SQUARE Limited and Triple B Incorporation. Apart from civil representation, he also represented the Barksdale Organization in various criminal trials.

=== Season 1 ===
In the pilot episode, "The Target", Levy represented Avon's nephew D'Angelo Barksdale at the Pooh Blanchard murder trial and successfully returned an acquittal. Levy's case was strengthened when Nakeesha Lyles, a key witness, changed her story and refused to identify Barksdale in court. The next time D'Angelo was arrested, Levy rebuked him for writing a letter of condolence – at McNulty and Bunk's urging – to the family of a murdered witness.

He was able to get the charges dropped against young Barksdale dealer Bodie Broadus in juvenile court, claiming to the judge that the work was part of his firm's pro bono outreach program. Levy also advised Stringer Bell and Avon Barksdale on how to protect themselves when they suspected they were being investigated. His assertion that they should tie up any loose ends, particularly those not bound by ties of loyalty to them, led to the death of Nakeesha Lyles.

When Barksdale front owner Orlando was arrested for attempting to purchase drugs, Levy visited him in prison and instructed him to sign papers removing his name from the liquor license of his club. Levy later represented Barksdale soldier Savino when he was arrested following a failed undercover operation, in the course of which Orlando and Detective Greggs were shot. Levy was able to limit Savino's charge to a 3-year plea bargain for an attempt to supply fake narcotics, as he was not directly implicated in the shooting.

Later, Levy was instrumental in damage control when the Barksdale organization was struck by multiple arrests. He ensured that D'Angelo was not kept in police protection, allowing his mother to convince him not to testify against the Barksdale organization.

=== Season 2 ===
Levy successfully negotiated Avon's first parole hearing in exchange for information on a corrupt guard, following the deaths of several inmates. Avon had actually set up the deaths to frame the guard, with the reduced sentence as his goal. He was less successful in his defense of "Bird" Hilton in the William Gant murder trial, particularly struggling with the cross-examination of Omar Little.

When Levy attempted to undermine him as a credible witness, describing him as an amoral parasite feeding off the Baltimore drug trade, Omar pointed out that the same was true of Levy, saying "I got the shotgun; you got the briefcase. It's all in the game." Omar's accusation left Levy speechless, and Bird was sentenced to life imprisonment by Judge Daniel Phelan, though Levy maintained (accurately) that Omar was perjuring himself when he claimed to have witnessed the crime.

=== Season 3 ===
After Stringer is duped by Senator Clay Davis, Levy chastises him, saying that he was aware of Davis's reputation for taking contributions without exerting any actual influence. Levy continued to defend Avon and most of his organization when a second wiretap investigation led to a mass prosecution. Avon was returned to prison. Levy also represented Poot Carr, who received a four-year sentence.

=== Season 4 ===
Levy is seen briefly in season four, representing Anthony Wardell in the high-profile Braddock murder case. He allowed his client to undergo a polygraph test because he was convinced of his innocence on the charge.

=== Season 5 ===
Levy hires ex-police officer Thomas "Herc" Hauk as an investigator. Levy encourages Herc to use the firm's expense account to pay for officers' bar tabs, in exchange for information. After being introduced to Marlo Stanfield by Proposition Joe, Levy counsels Stanfield on money laundering. Levy later suspects (on the basis of information provided by Herc) that Marlo's arrest is due to an illegal wiretap and sees an opportunity to get the charges against Marlo's organization dropped.

Levy however faces legal problems of his own when Grand Jury Prosecutor Gary DiPasquale admits to Detective Lester Freamon that he has been selling copies of court documents and search warrants to Levy to be used to tip off various drug dealers. Realizing that Levy is legally vulnerable, but also aware that the evidence against the Stanfield Organization is compromised, ASA Rhonda Pearlman negotiates the charges against Stanfield's crew.

It is agreed that Marlo will not face criminal charges if he retires permanently from the drug trade, Levy will not be prosecuted, the State's Attorney's office will not be charged with allowing an illegal wiretap, Chris Partlow will plead to life without parole for the vacant murders, and the remaining Stanfield Lieutenants will plead to possession charges. Levy is last seen in the final episode of season five, socializing with Marlo Stanfield at a downtown evening event and introducing him to different businessmen.

== Analysis and origins ==
Levy is among The Wire's least sympathetic characters; Slate writer David Plotz describes him as "the most repulsive piece of garbage in the city of Baltimore." He is also the show's most explicitly Jewish character. Avon Barksdale's sister Brianna refers to him as "that Jew lawyer," and Levy is shown using Yiddish words (for instance, saying Herc was mishpoche, meaning "family," and describing Clay Davis as a goniff, or thief), praising his wife's brisket, criticizing McNulty for "dragging me from the Levy family preserve on a Friday night," etc.

Some writers have suggested that the character reflects some antisemitic stereotypes. Keith Kahn-Harris, for example, writes that "Levy's crookedness, his cynical exploitation of the drug trade and his 'seduction' of Herc all recall common negative stereotypes of Jews as sinister, venal and secretive." David Simon, who is himself Jewish, has explained and justified the characterization as authentic:

Why did we make this guy Jewish? Because when I was covering the drug trade for 13 years for the Sun, most of the major drug lawyers were Jewish. Some of them are now disbarred and others are not but came pretty close. Anyone who is anyone in law enforcement in Baltimore knows the three or four guys Maury Levy is patterned on.

If I have people from every other tribe in Baltimore portrayed negatively, everyone is maligned in some way, how can I not do that to the Jewish guy? How can I pull that punch? At that point I'm just being hypocritical. Here are good people from my own tribe who say how can you do that, and my answer is how can I not?

Rhonda Pearlman, "one of a handful of generally positive characters in the show," is also Jewish, and Kahn-Harris argues that Jay Landsman, a somewhat sympathetic character, is Jewish as well. However, Kahn-Harris writes that "Their Jewishness is not referred to as explicitly as Levy’s is and it is not treated as a significant source of either characters’ strengths and weaknesses."

== See also ==
- Saul Goodman, a comparable character in Breaking Bad
