= D'Angelo Barksdale =

Character from The Wire

- The Wire character
- Larry Gilliard Jr. as D'Angelo Barksdale
- First appearance: "The Target" (2002)
- Last appearance: "All Prologue" (2003)
- Created by: David Simon
- Portrayed by: Larry Gilliard Jr.

In-universe information
- Alias: Dee
- Occupation: Crew chief
- Family: Brianna Barksdale (mother); Avon Barksdale (uncle)
- Significant others: Donette; Shardene Innes
- Children: Tyrell Barksdale (son)
- Date of birth: c.1978-79
- Date of death: July 21, 2003 (aged about 23)

D'Angelo "Dee" Barksdale is a fictional character on the HBO drama The Wire, played by Lawrence Gilliard Jr. D'Angelo is the nephew of Avon Barksdale and a lieutenant in his drug dealing organization which controls most of the trade in West Baltimore. Stuck between the top and the bottom of the drug trade, he represents the trope of the everyman, and pathos is derived from his wider emotional range than the other gangsters, situation and fate. The immorality and ruthlessness of the drug trade gradually wears on D'Angelo's conscience, bringing him into conflict with the Barksdale leadership, most notably Stringer Bell.

== Biography ==
=== Season 1 ===
Approximately 23 years of age, D'Angelo Barksdale is a high-ranking lieutenant in the criminal organization of his uncle Avon Barksdale. His mother Brianna is also a high-ranking advisor.

Prior to the series, D'Angelo controlled the high-rise tower of 221 West Fremont, a major drug market. He was confronted by dealer "Pooh" Blanchard in the lobby and, in a panic, shot him in front of civilian witnesses. He was quickly arrested and served 8 months in county jail before, in the series premiere, standing trial for this murder, represented by the organization's lawyer Maurice Levy. Though one witness, William Gant, willingly testifies, the organization had scared and/or bribed the other witness, Nakeesha Lyles, to recant her testimony, and D'Angelo is acquitted. As punishment for his carelessness, Avon demotes D'Angelo to the low rise projects known as "The Pit", where his crew consists of Bodie Broadus, Poot, Wallace, Cass and Sterling.

Over the course of the season, D'Angelo grows increasingly ambivalent about the drug trade. Hesitant about discipline (such as the brutal beating of Johnny Weeks, or punishing dealers Cass and Sterling for stealing small amounts), he is shaken when Gant turns up dead, assuming Avon ordered his murder as revenge for testifying. He is later brought in for questioning by detectives Jimmy McNulty and Bunk Moreland, who trick him into writing a letter of apology to Gant's fictitious family after showing him what is actually a photo of Bunk's own family. Levy arrives and stops D'Angelo before he can write anything incriminating, and he is released. He questions his uncle, who evades his accusations and persuades him to remain loyal to the family.

D'Angelo is also involved in a second murder, that of Avon's girlfriend Deirdre Kresson. Earlier in the season, D'Angelo had falsely claimed responsibility for killing Kresson himself, apparently in an attempt to impress his subordinates Bodie, Poot, and Wallace. When Bodie challenges his authority, after escaping from custody, when he got arrested. However, when cooperating with the police after his arrest at the end of the season, D'Angelo claims he had delivered drugs to Kresson, after which Wee-Bey Brice tapped on Kresson's kitchen window to get her attention before shooting her. Wee-Bey gladly takes the blame for this, as well as other murders that were unsolved at the time of his arrest, since he was facing life without parole either way.

D'Angelo has a son, Tyrell, with his girlfriend Donette. She wants D'Angelo to move in with her, but he does not want, or is unable to handle the responsibility of being a regular citizen and family man. He begins dating a dancer from his uncle's strip club, Shardene Innes, and lives with her for a short time, until Shardene finds out from the police that her colleague Keesha had overdosed, died, and been left in a dumpster after attending a Barksdale crew party. Shardene accuses D'Angelo of seeing her as trash that could easily be discarded, and moves out, and later goes on to cooperate with the police unit investigating the Barksdale clan, eventually beginning a relationship with Lester Freamon.

Under D'Angelo's firm leadership, The Pit begins to turn a good profit. It nevertheless becomes a cause for concern when its stash is stolen by Omar Little, the next day Wee Bey reprimands him for not being present, when the robbery took place as he cannot name any of the robbers. Bodie mentions Omar's name before a police raid takes place. While the police's information is slightly outdated, and they raid a now-abandoned stash house, Lester finds D'Angelo's uncoded pager number on a wall.

Stringer chastises D'Angelo for his sloppiness, and Avon places a bounty on Omar's crew. Off screen Bey is able to murder John Bailey. One night, Wallace and Poot identify Omar's boyfriend, Brandon, in an arcade. D'Angelo relays the message to Stringer, who has Brandon captured, tortured, and killed, with Bey, Bird, Stinkum and the corpse displayed in the courtyard of Wallace's home. Wallace becomes haunted by his role in Brandon's death. When Wallace expresses a desire to leave the business after seeing Brandon's mutilated remains, D'Angelo, who has developed a friendship with Wallace during his time in the Pit, is supportive and gives him money, encouraging him to finish his education.

Stringer eventually begins asking after Wallace. D'Angelo senses that Wallace is in trouble and requests that Avon "let the boy be", reassuring Avon that Wallace is no danger to the organization. When Wallace returns and asks for his old job back, D'Angelo attempts to get him to leave, but is unable to convince him telling him that if he does he must remain committed. Wallace is murdered by Bodie and Poot on Stringer's orders, though D'Angelo remains unaware of his death.

Based indirectly on information Shardene provided to the police (heard on a microphone inside the club), D'Angelo is arrested while transporting drugs from New York, and is again interrogated. McNulty tells him that Wallace is dead. D'Angelo remembers the trick from before that got him writing a letter to Gant's fictitious family and doesn't believe him at first. When Stringer and Levy come to talk to him, D'Angelo demands to know where Wallace is. Stringer refuses to answer and warns D'Angelo to shut his mouth, confirming in D'Angelo's mind his suspicions. Furious, D'Angelo tells Stringer he will get his own lawyer rather than use Levy, permanently driving a wedge in their already fractured relationship.

D'Angelo briefly turns state's witness against his uncle's organization, offering numerous details, including where Wee-Bey has fled to after the shooting of Kima Greggs. However, a visit from Brianna convinces him of his duty to his family, and he reneges on the deal. Due to his refusal to cooperate, he is sentenced to a maximum of 20 years in prison. While serving his sentence, he says the best he can hope for is 10 years before a possibility of parole.

=== Season 2 ===
While in prison with Avon and Wee-Bey, D'Angelo has begun to use heroin. Although he is distant from his uncle, Avon still protects him and gets him a cushy job in the prison library.

Wee-Bey is continuously harassed by a guard named Dwight Tilghman, who is involved in the prison drug trade, spurring Avon to arrange to have Tilghman's heroin supply laced with rat poison. Avon advises D'Angelo to stay off the drug for a few days to prove he's not addicted, but does not tell D'Angelo of the "hot shots".

After five prisoners die and eight more land in the infirmary, Avon informs on Tilghman in exchange for an earlier parole board hearing and a recommendation for early release. D'Angelo refuses to take part in the plan and, disgusted by his uncle's immorality, declares that he wants nothing more to do with his family or with Stringer. In the prison Avon attempts to reconcile with D'Angelo, they exchange looks, but D'Angelo is to alienated to care

Stringer grows afraid that D'Angelo may inform on the organization and hires a contract killer from Washington, D.C., who in turn arranges for a prisoner to strangle D'Angelo with a belt in the back room of the library, staging the scene to look like a suicide. No investigation is launched, although McNulty becomes convinced that it was a murder when he is belatedly informed of D'Angelo's death and investigates it on his own. D'Angelo's family members continue to believe it was a suicide until McNulty confronts Donette and Brianna with his suspicions. Stringer eventually reveals to Avon his involvement in the murder in season 3. This causes a rift to grow between them until Avon eventually gives Stringer up to be killed by Omar and Brother Mouzone. Brianna, having grown suspicious of Avon's supposed involvement in her son's death, distanced herself from her brother.

== Critical response ==
A San Francisco Chronicle review picked the scene of D'Angelo instructing Bodie and Wallace on the rules of chess as one of the first season's finest moments. They praised the character of D'Angelo and the show's portrayal of his difficulties as "middle management" in the drug organization: having to deal with unreliable subordinates, demanding superiors, and his own conscience.
