= Avon Barksdale =

Character from The Wire

- The Wire character
- Wood Harris as Avon Barksdale
- First appearance: "The Target" (2002)
- Last appearance: "Unconfirmed Reports" (2008)
- Created by: David Simon
- Portrayed by: Wood Harris

In-universe information
- Gender: Male
- Occupation: Drug kingpin
- Family: Brianna Barksdale (sister); D'Angelo Barksdale (nephew)

Avon Randolph Barksdale is a fictional character and one of the main antagonists in the American television series The Wire, played by Wood Harris. Barksdale is one of the most powerful drug dealers in Baltimore, Maryland, and runs the Barksdale Organization. Stringer Bell, his second in command, insulates Barksdale from law enforcement and potential enemies. Working for Barksdale and Bell is a large organization of drug dealers and enforcers.

Accepting nothing less than absolute power, Barksdale is shrewd and intuitive, although not as cerebral as Bell. Barksdale is partly based on a real-life gang leader who ran a drug dealing operation in West Baltimore. He is the main antagonist of the first season.

== Biography ==
=== Criminal organization ===
At the start of season 1, Avon is a furtive but increasingly powerful force within West Baltimore's drug trade. His territory includes both the Franklin Terrace housing project and a nearby low-rise project referred to as "the Pit". Avon runs the organization with his second-in-command, Russell "Stringer" Bell, but isolates himself and String from the drug trade and eschews overt displays of wealth. He has a number of enforcers, most notably his old friend Wee-Bey Brice, and several lieutenants running drug crews in different areas. Beneath the lieutenants are hoppers who trade drugs and look out for police.

Every member of the Barksdale Organization is disciplined to strict rules designed to thwart police investigations, most notably a prohibition on cell phones. Lieutenants and enforcers carry pagers so they can be contacted. The pager messages are encoded to prevent traceable payphones from being used. Each pager-carrying member of the organization is identified by a number. When pages are returned with a phone call, no names are supposed to be used.

Avon receives his narcotics supply through a connection to a Dominican organization. The main supply of narcotics is separated from the rest of the organization and held in a house in Pimlico, where it can be cut and divided into smaller "stashes" for distribution in Barksdale territory. The money from the sales of drugs is counted in the back office of Orlando's strip club, which serves as Avon's main front business; it is there that Avon conducts day-to-day business, rarely venturing onto the street.

=== Season 1 ===
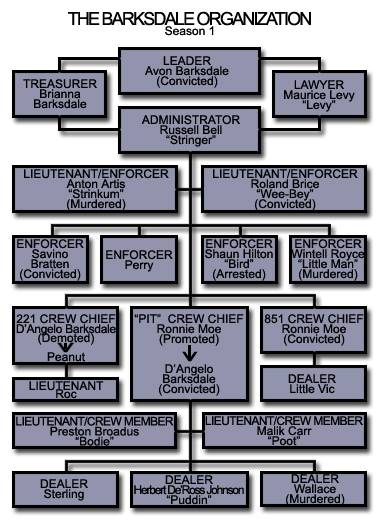
The Barksdale Organization (season one)

When Avon's errant nephew D'Angelo murders drug dealer Pooh Blanchard, he has Stringer pay a witness to change her story in court. D'Angelo is acquitted, but Avon demotes him to "The Pit" to replace Ronnie Mo, who had recently been promoted to his own tower in the Franklin Terrace project. Avon also orders Marquis "Bird" Hilton to murder a second witness, William Gant, whom he had been unable to intimidate or bribe. Gant's body is left on display to deter people from testifying. D'Angelo is shaken by Gant's murder and begins to have second thoughts, but Avon persuades him to remain loyal to the family.

Avon is angered when the Pit's stash is robbed by Omar Little, and he places a large bounty on Omar and his crew. He nearly doubles it upon discovering Omar is homosexual. Wee-Bey kills Omar's associate John Bailey; Omar's lover Brandon Wright is captured and tortured by Stringer, Wee-Bey, Bird, and Stinkum. In response, Omar kills Stinkum and wounds Wee-Bey. He later attempts to assassinate Avon outside of Orlando's, but Wee-Bey manages to save him at the last minute. He renews Stringer's counsel to distance himself, placing more trust in Lieutenants.

The Pit is subject to police raids, resulting in the seizure of a second supply of narcotics and the arrest of two Barksdale associates. The police seize a day's profits from Wee-Bey, totaling $22,000. They also briefly seize a payment on its way to State Senator Clay Davis but are forced to return it because of Davis' political influence. The robbery and police activity combined raise suspicion that there is a leak in the Pit, and the increasingly paranoid Avon orders D'Angelo to remove the payphones near the projects, which have indeed been wiretapped.

Avon's front man Orlando Blocker persists in trying to sell cocaine independently and ultimately gets arrested by an undercover state cop. When Orlando agrees to aid the police in their investigation, Avon orders Wee-Bey, Little Man, and Savino Bratton to kill him. The job is complicated when Little Man accidentally shoots the undercover detective Kima Greggs, who is accompanying Orlando at the time. This leads to a massive crackdown from the police. Avon and Stringer hold a crisis meeting with attorney Maurice Levy, who advises them to remove any possible loose ends; Avon subsequently orders several murders. Including the other witness in D'Angelo's trial, a female security guard who withdrew her testimony.

Avon finally incriminates himself on a hidden camera in his office when he sends D'Angelo to pick up a package of drugs. Avon is arrested by Jimmy McNulty and Cedric Daniels on charges of possession with intent to distribute, but as this was the only arrest he had ever incurred, he is sentenced to a total of seven years with possibility of parole.

=== Season 2 ===
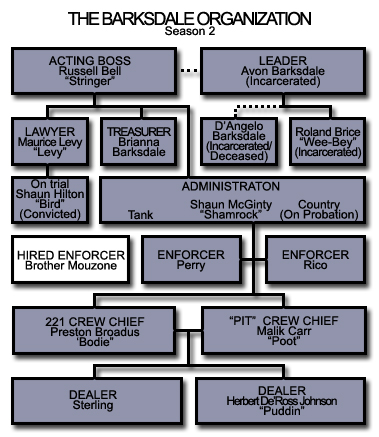
The Barksdale Organization (season two)

Avon continues to run his organization from prison, through Stringer. D'Angelo and Wee-Bey are imprisoned alongside Avon, serving much longer terms. When Avon fails to dissuade prison guard Dwight Tilghman from harassing Wee-Bey, he conspires with Stringer to taint Tilghman's illicit supply of heroin into the prison. When the state police open an investigation into the resulting deaths, Avon comes forward as an "informant" and frames Tilghman for the crime.

For his "testimony", Avon's first parole hearing is moved up a year. The depressed D'Angelo grows more distant from Avon and turns to drug use. Without Avon's knowledge, Stringer has D'Angelo killed and his death staged to look like a suicide.

The Dominicans cut ties with Avon upon suspecting he gave them up in exchange for a lighter sentence. Avon recommends secondary suppliers to Stringer but is unable to secure anything much better. Stringer tells Avon that Proposition Joe has offered to supply high-quality heroin from the Greeks in exchange for doing business in Barksdale territory. Avon dismisses the idea, but Stringer eventually decides to go over Avon's head and approve the plan.

Not knowing of Stringer's double-dealing, Avon contracts feared hitman Brother Mouzone to defend his turf. Stringer tricks Omar into believing that Mouzone tortured and killed Brandon. Omar shoots Mouzone, but lets him live after realizing things do not add up. Mouzone returns to New York to recover, while Avon reluctantly agrees to Proposition Joe's proposal.

=== Season 3 ===
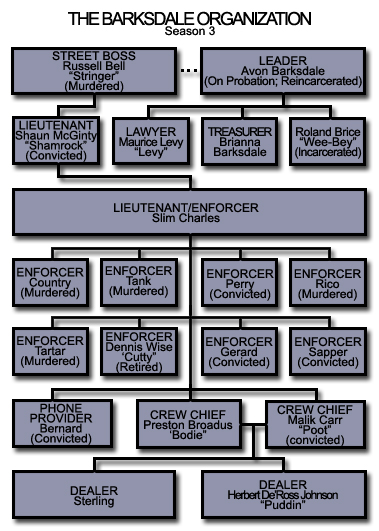
The Barksdale Organization (season three)

Upon his release from prison, Avon is outraged at how much territory Stringer has lost and gets involved in a gang war with Marlo Stanfield, who has begun to muscle in to the Barksdale territory. When Stringer orders two Barksdale "hitters" to ambush Omar as he accompanies his grandmother to church, Avon is angered by the breach of a long-standing truce on Sunday mornings. After letting the soldiers responsible wait for hours at headquarters, he orders them to buy Omar's grandmother a new hat.

Meanwhile, Avon tries to recruit Dennis "Cutty" Wise, a former gang soldier, into his organization. Cutty joins the group for a time but soon admits that the game is not in him anymore. Avon allows Cutty to retire, and later donates $15,000 to help him start a boxing gym for neighborhood boys.

Avon and Stringer continue to clash over their conflicting methods of leadership; Proposition Joe tells Stringer that he will withhold his drug supply if the gang war continues. But Avon believes that giving in to Marlo will diminish the Barksdales, Avon attempts to lure Marlo into an ambush but this fails. During a conversations with Stringer, Slim Charles informs him that Devonne, who Avon used to set up the ambush is killed Avon refuses to back down. Avon's relationship with Stringer is damaged irreparably when Stringer tries to dissuade Avon from escalating further war. After finding out the truth about what really happened to D'Angelo, due to McNulty conducting an investigation into D'Angelo's murder. Stringer reveals he did it during an argument, after Avon questions his ability. A physical fight ensues, with Stringer gaining the upper hand over Avon, who is still weak from a shotgun wound by Stansfield lieutenant Chris Partlow, who foiled ambush attempt on Marlo.

In an effort to return Avon to prison, Stringer contacts Major Howard "Bunny" Colvin and reveals where Avon keeps his weapons. Meanwhile, Avon reluctantly provides Brother Mouzone with information about Stringer's whereabouts, allowing him and Omar to kill Stringer. Avon privately concedes to Slim Charles that he has come around to Stringer's point of view and is tired of "beefing over a couple fuckin' corners". Slim retorts that they are already in a war, and even if the premise for it is false, they must still fight on it.

Based on evidence that Stringer provided to Colvin, the Major Crimes Unit raids Avon's safe house and are able to put weapons and conspiracy charges on all those present. Mcnulty shows Avon the warrant with Stringer's name on it. Avon's presence constitutes a parole violation, which mandates serving the remaining five years of his sentence. Avon ends up in court with all those apprehended during the bust sitting behind him. During a court hearing Marlo and Chris sit in the public gallery, a brief glance is exchanged between them before Avon is sent back to prison.

=== Season 5 ===
Marlo arranges a meeting with Sergei Malatov at MCI Jessup with hopes of contacting the Greeks and Spiros Vondas. He instead encounters Avon, who reveals that he still has a formidable reputation, and that Sergei had approached him once he began receiving direct payments from Marlo. Avon agrees, philosophically, with Marlo's plan to get around Proposition Joe and cut the Eastsiders out of the supply connection. Avon states that he is prepared to let bygones be bygones regarding their past war. However, he informs Marlo that in order to gain access to Sergei, Marlo has to pay Brianna $100,000.

Marlo agrees, makes the payment, and is granted access to Sergei, with Avon watching from the side. Sergei is initially uninterested in cooperating with Marlo's plan but is swayed when Marlo points out that if any arrangement he can make with Vondas are beneficial to the Greeks, it will be Sergei who "made it happen". By the end of the series, Marlo's second-in-command Chris Partlow makes peace with the Barksdales as well, as he is seen fraternizing with Wee-Bey in a prison courtyard.

== Origins ==
David Simon has disputed that any one individual is the model for any specific character in The Wire. He has stated on The Wire DVD that Avon is a composite of several Baltimore drug dealers. Avon is likely based, to some extent, on Melvin Williams (who plays the character of The Deacon) and Nathan Barksdale.
