= Alliances (The Wire) =

- The Wire episode
- Episode no.: Season 4 Episode 5
- Directed by: David Platt
- Story by: David Simon; Ed Burns
- Teleplay by: Ed Burns
- Original air date: October 8, 2006
- Running time: 58 minutes

Episode chronology
← Previous "Refugees"	Next → "Margin of Error"

"Alliances" is the fifth episode of the fourth season of the HBO original series The Wire. Written by Ed Burns with a story by David Simon & Ed Burns, and directed by David Platt, it originally aired on October 8, 2006.

== Plot ==
Dukie, Randy, Namond, Michael, Donut, and Kenard discuss Lex' disappearance. Namond, Donut, and Kenard believe that Partlow is turning his victims into zombies. At school, Prez offers prizes to students who exhibit good behavior, while the most disruptive students get detention. Prez gives Michael and Namond detention for not attempting their work and sends Namond to the office when he swears at Prez.

Colvin believes the students in the school can be split into two broad groups: The better-behaved "stoop kids" and the disruptive, street-acclimated "corner kids". Colvin believes that by accepting the latter into Parenti's in-school program, both groups could do better. After discussion with Grace Sampson and Dr. Parenti, Sampson suggests that the key is coming up with a program to benefit the corner kids. They encounter Namond in the halls on his way to the office, and he swears at Parenti. Donnelly suggests that Colvin and Parenti begin with ten children.

Prez learns that Michael cannot make detention since he needs to walk Bug home, and Prez tells Michael to notify him if he's unable to make detention. Prez gives Dukie some of his lunch, a hall pass, and money to get something to drink. When Dukie leaves the room, Crystal explains that Dukie is not wearing the new clothes Prez gave him because his family steals his possessions and sells them for drug money.

After school, Randy talks to Dukie about his fears of Partlow coming for him and confesses his role in Lex' murder. Dukie tries to convince Randy that Partlow is simply murdering his victims in the vacant rowhouses, explaining that he saw one killing from his bedroom window. Dukie takes Michael and Randy to one of the vacant buildings Partlow has used and shows them a body interred there. Randy is forced to face up to Partlow's victims being truly dead.

=== Politics ===
Major Stan Valchek visits Tommy Carcetti at his campaign offices. He tells Carcetti about Detective Norris being reassigned from the murdered-witness case and replaced with homicide rookie Kima Greggs. After Valchek leaves, Carcetti discusses with Norman Wilson and Theresa D'Agostino how the information might be used. Wilson suggests giving the story to Councilman Anthony Gray to allow him to press the mayor over the witness case and draw off more of his votes.

Mayor Clarence Royce shaves off his beard, hoping that a return to the image he presented when first elected will improve his polling. Royce's Chief of Staff Coleman Parker is impressed with the change.

Meanwhile, Carcetti campaigns hard, giving out fliers in the early morning. Wilson reports that Gray has accepted their offer for a meeting. At the meeting, Gray sees through their motives for giving him the information but decides to use it regardless, knowing that it will help him as well. Wilson tells Gray that at this point Gray cannot hope to win and should consider reconciling with Carcetti and gearing up for another position.

Royce has a strategy meeting but is interrupted by Parker, who has noticed the media reporting on the witness story. Royce angrily confronts Commissioner Ervin Burrell about this new problem emanating from his department. Royce berates Burrell for his overzealous efforts to slow the witness case, finally ordering him out of the office. With Burrell gone, Royce questions his deputy commissioner, William Rawls. Rawls claims that he is loyal to Burrell but knew Burrell was making a mistake. He tells Royce that he could handle the pressure of Burrell's position. Royce then asks Rawls to make this incident go away, promising not to forget Rawls' loyalty.

Watkins confronts Royce over the mayor's use of multiple campaign tickets, with one ticket endorsing Eunetta Perkins and another endorsing Marla Daniels. Watkins also chides Royce for his decision-making regarding the witness killing. After Royce stands firm, Watkins says he will sit out the election and storms out of the office. Royce declines to chase after Watkins, despite Parker's pleas that he do so.

Rawls discovers that Watkins has broken from the mayor and tells Carcetti, who immediately goes to Watkins' office with Wilson to pitch for Watkins' support. Carcetti indicates that he would be more dependent on Watkins' help than Royce if elected, and declares that the polls are closer than Royce admits.

=== Western District ===
Lieutenant Charlie Marimow meets with Assistant State's Attorney Rhonda Pearlman and Western district commander Major Cedric Daniels to discuss executing a series of warrants in the Western district. Daniels obligingly provides Marimow with the extra manpower he will require. Pearlman warns Marimow that he is wasting his wiretap on low-level targets that she will refuse to litigate against and refuses to accept responsibility for any mistakes he makes.

Marimow briefs his own men along with Daniels's DEU squad and flex squad and tries to convince them of the importance of the raids. After the briefing, Ellis Carver questions Thomas "Herc" Hauk about the logic of attempting street rips against Marlo Stanfield's people and advises Herc to take an interest in Royce's continued success because Royce will be unable to advance Herc's career unless he retains his position as mayor. Pearlman discusses her career with Daniels. With Marimow in charge of the major crimes unit and the subpoenas issued against Royce fundraisers, Pearlman has lost hope in her position and begins wondering where she might ask Demper to reassign her.

Marimow's raids are disastrous: Stash houses from the wiretap have long since moved, and very few arrests are made. Marimow believes that the drug dealers are stupid, claiming they must have been tipped off, and diverts the blame onto his sergeant by insisting that he find out more about Marlo. Carver steps in and mentions that Marlo often holds court in a particular open area. Marimow tells Herc to come up with an investigative plan using this tip. Herc, Officer Kenneth Dozerman, and Detective Leander Sydnor set up a concealed surveillance camera at Marlo's meeting place, but their efforts are noticed by a Stanfield soldier. Herc believes that the camera will build a case for them if they can find someone who can read lips to tell them what Marlo is saying and dismisses Sydnor's questions about the legality of the approach. Herc spends some time making campaign calls for Royce. His direct approach has some success with a voter.

=== Stanfield Organization ===
Marlo and Chris discuss how to deal with Omar after his robbery of Marlo at a card game. Marlo wants to go straight after Omar by placing a bounty on him, but Chris reminds him of Avon Barksdale's failed efforts to track down Omar and convinces him that a subtle approach will be more likely to succeed and will prevent Omar from targeting them in return.

At their next meeting, Chris reports that Slim Charles approached him to organize a second meeting between Proposition Joe and Marlo. Old Face Andre arrives to talk to Marlo, who tells Andre that his store is going to be robbed again and instructs him to later identify Omar as the culprit when reporting the crime to the police. Andre worries that Omar will seek revenge, but Marlo assures him Omar will never be released after his arrest.

Chris later robs the store with Snoop, killing a delivery woman and pistol-whipping Andre before reminding him to blame Omar. Chris reports to Marlo that the robbery was a success. Marlo tells Chris about the surveillance camera and asks him to take Marlo to the meeting with Proposition Joe.

At the meeting, Joe tells Marlo that he has a network of sources that provide him with information about activity on the street and within the justice system. He shows Marlo warrants for a drug kingpin named Charlie and is non-committal about helping Marlo, since he is outside of the co-op. Marlo asks Joe about the video surveillance and finally agrees to work with the co-op in exchange for information about those investigating him.

=== Homicide ===
Bunk Moreland and Lester Freamon scour Baltimore for bodies they can tie to Marlo in the hope of finding Lex. They check with the coroner's office, in the sewers, and in Leakin Park. Freamon recalls going to the park to look for a body as a cadet and being warned to only take an interest in bodies matching a specific description or else they'd end up wasting time with other bodies. When they return to the office empty-handed, Bunk convinces Freamon to turn his attention back to investigating real murders.

At the office, Detectives Ed Norris, Vernon Holley, Greggs, and Massey watch Gray talk about the witness case on television. Greggs is later called in to meet with Sergeant Jay Landsman. Landsman tells her that Norris is back on the Braddock witness case. Rawls plans to claim that Norris and Greggs were always working the case together. Greggs is dismayed that she is being humiliated a second time. Landsman tells Greggs that she must be more ready to play the political side of the spectrum now that she is in the high-profile homicide unit. Finally, Landsman insists that Greggs must attend a press conference about the investigation.

Crutchfield and Holley catch the case of the woman murdered in Andre's store. When they interview Andre, he points the finger at Omar.

=== Bubbles ===
Bubbles spots Sherrod working for a drug-dealing crew and chastises him for truancy. Sherrod's customer takes exception to Bubbles's interruption and attacks him, taking his drugs. When Sherrod returns to their squat that night, Bubbles tells him that he must leave in the morning unless he attends school the next day.

== Production ==
=== Title reference ===
The title refers to the alliance that Marlo enters into with Proposition Joe. It also refers to the alliances formed by Carcetti in the political world: with Rawls, Valchek and Watkins. It also references the breaking of Watkins' alliance with Royce because of the strength of his support for Marla Daniels, and perhaps most obviously, to the offer made by Chris and Snoop to Michael.

=== Epigraph ===
If you with us, you with us. - Chris Partlow

Partlow makes this statement when trying to convince Michael Lee to join the Stanfield drug dealing organization. It is counterpointed by Wee-Bey's remarks about the heyday of the Barksdale organization.

=== Credits ===
==== Starring cast ====
Although credited, Dominic West, Chad L. Coleman, J. D. Williams and Michael K. Williams do not appear in this episode.

==== Guest stars ====
- Jermaine Crawford as Duquan "Dukie" Weems
- Maestro Harrell as Randy Wagstaff
- Julito McCullum as Namond Brice
- Tristan Wilds as Michael Lee
- Gbenga Akinnagbe as Chris Partlow
- Robert F. Chew as Proposition Joe
- Anwan Glover as Slim Charles
- Hassan Johnson as Roland "Wee-Bey" Brice
- Dan DeLuca as Dr. David Parenti
- Tootsie Duvall as Assistant Principal Marcia Donnelly
- Dravon James as Mrs. Grace Sampson
- Christopher Mann as Councilman Anthony Gray
- Cleo Reginald Pizana as Chief of Staff Coleman Parker
- Frederick Strother as State Delegate Odell Watkins
- Boris McGiver as Lieutenant Charles Marimow
- Ed Norris as Detective Ed Norris
- Delaney Williams as Sergeant Jay Landsman
- Sandi McCree as De'Londa Brice
- Alfonso Christian Lover as Old Face Andre
- Felicia Pearson as Snoop
- Al Brown as Major Stan Valchek
- Brandy Burre as Theresa D'Agostino
- Tyreeka Freamon as School Secretary
- Brian Anthony Wilson as Detective Vernon Holley
- Armando Cadogan, Jr. as Bubbles' tormentor
- Nathan Corbett as Donut
- Thuliso Dingwall as Kenard
- Taylor King as Zenobia Dawson
- Rashad Orange as Sherrod

==== Uncredited appearances ====
- Benjamin Busch as Officer Anthony Colicchio
- Rick Otto as Detective Kenneth Dozerman
- Gregory L. Williams as Detective Michael Crutchfield
- Kwame Patterson as Monk Metcalf
- Richard Hildebird as Principal Claudell Withers
- Destiny Jackson-Evans as Crystal Judkins
- Jeffrey Lorenzo as Karim Williams
- Rakiya Orange as Charlene Young
- Jason Wharton as Albert Stokes
- Corbin Smith as Monell
- David J. Smolar as Newspaper Reporter
- Unknown as Paul
- Unknown as Tiff
- Unknown as Lieutenant Hoskins
- Unknown as Detective Mackey
- Unknown as Flex Squad Detective

=== First appearances ===
- Zenobia Dawson: eighth grade student in Prez's math class who comes from a poor background and is difficult to control.
