= Know Your Place =

- The Wire episode
- Episode no.: Season 4 Episode 9
- Directed by: Alex Zakrzewski
- Story by: Ed Burns; Kia Corthron
- Teleplay by: Kia Corthron
- Original air date: November 12, 2006
- Running time: 58 minutes

Episode chronology
← Previous "Corner Boys"	Next → "Misgivings"

"Know Your Place" is the ninth episode of the fourth season of the HBO original series The Wire. Written by Kia Corthron from a story by Ed Burns & Kia Corthron, and directed by Alex Zakrzewski, it originally aired on November 12, 2006.

== Plot summary ==
=== Bodie's crew ===
Poot returns to the streets from prison after having been arrested alongside Avon Barksdale and many of his lieutenants and soldiers. Bodie tells him about how Marlo was able to threaten the crew into working under him, but Poot does not mind the change of leadership, stating that one boss is the same as the next. Herc and Dozerman pull up in a patrol car, looking for Little Kevin to question in Lex's murder. Nobody tells Herc their names. Recognizing only Bodie and Poot, he says everyone under 5'6" and 150 lbs. goes into the wagon, and the three smallest corner boys are snatched up. Not realizing that Kevin's nickname is a joke about his portly size, Herc and Dozerman leave the real Little Kevin on the street.

Bodie delineates Namond's new corners, having been pressured by De'Londa, insisting that Namond keep his mother from interceding again. As they work their corner, Carver and Colicchio catch Namond's crew unprepared. The corner boys flee, but eight-year-old Kenard is not fast enough. Carver destroys the stash of vials and lets Kenard go, claiming that it is not worth processing. When Carver catches up with Namond, Donut, and Kenard at Cutty's gym, he chastises them for being so careless and warns them that the next time he catches them dealing drugs, he will beat them and send them to be processed for juvenile detention.

=== Politics ===
Carcetti attends a meeting with city leaders to inform him of the issues facing Baltimore as he heads toward his mayoral term. On the matter of growing the tax base, Carcetti raises the idea of adding casinos to the waterfront, but it is shot down. The city council president, Campbell, finds it suspicious that Carcetti wants to give a pay raise to the position of commissioner, given Burrell's recent poor performance, and explains how such a raise will never make it into the budget. Later, in private, Campbell tells Carcetti that Royce had groomed her to be his successor. She seems angry at both Carcetti and Gray for jumping the line to take Royce's position as mayor, given their more junior status in the city council. Carcetti admits to being ignorant of this relationship, and hints that she may become mayor, being first in the line of succession, if he decides to run for governor in two years time.

Carcetti, Norman Wilson, and Delegate Watkins agree that firing Burrell is off the table because of the potential backlash of his black voters at the idea of a white mayor firing a black police commissioner. Carcetti tries to coax Burrell into stepping down, but Burrell understands the racial situation in which the mayor-elect finds himself and refuses to leave quietly, claiming that he will only do so if he is fired. Instead, Carcetti tells William Rawls that Burrell is to undertake no initiative as Commissioner without clearing it through him first. He then requests two promotions: Stan Valchek to Deputy Commissioner of Administration for helping him throughout the campaign, and Major Cedric Daniels will become C.I.D. Colonel, filling the late Ray Foerster's position. Carcetti claims that he wants to give Daniels carte blanche to reform the investigative units. Daniels tells Rhonda Pearlman that there's a chance Baltimore might be able to turn itself around under the new administration. She, Carver, Greggs and Sydnor are present at the promotion ceremony.

=== Bubbles ===
Bubbles tracks down Kima Greggs and tells her about the other junkie who has been assaulting and robbing him constantly. She tells him that, as a homicide detective, there is little she can do for him, but offers to put him in touch with Herc. The latter meets Bubbles and tells him he's looking for Little Kevin. Bubbles reuses his "hat trick”: visiting Bodie's crew, pretending to sell hats, and placing a red hat on Kevin as Herc watches from a distance. As Herc and Dozerman see the red hat go onto the real Little Kevin, the fattest member of the crew, they are both chagrined at their earlier stupidity in not having realized that Kevin's nickname was ironic. In return, Herc promises Bubbles to come within five minutes the next time his aggressor shows up again.

That night, Bubbles catches sight of the assailant in an alley. He quickly phones the major crimes unit from a payphone and leaves a message with Dozerman for Herc to come immediately. Herc is busy interrogating Little Kevin, whom he has brought in for questioning over Lex's murder. Herc gets Bubs' message and tells Dozerman to call Bubbles back and tell him to wait until tomorrow, forgetting that Bubs has no cell phone. Bubs sees a police car come down the street and makes his move, announcing his presence to his tormentor. But Herc is not in the car, and the driver does not see the two dope fiends' altercation. Bubs is once again badly beaten.

Meanwhile, Herc's interrogation of Little Kevin is fruitless. In an attempt to get Kevin to admit to witnessing the murder, Herc tells him that he's already talked to an informant who places him at the crime scene. When Kevin inquires if Randy is the person that he has talked to, Herc tips his hand by not making any inquiries about the name. Detective Sydnor leaves in disgust at Herc's attempt to interrogate Little Kevin. Sydnor tells Dozerman that they aren't going to get anywhere as they have no leverage, which Sydnor believes from past experience is key to making an interrogation work.

=== Prez's class ===
Prez sets his math class to work in groups. Watching Dukie use the class computer, Randy discovers that he can buy candy online in bulk and increase his profits, but he needs a credit card. They ask for Prez to order the candy with his card, stating that the business helps improve his arithmetic. Prez agrees on the condition that he receive the cash upfront, but warns Randy and Dukie against selling drugs to get the money more quickly.

As he and Dukie pass men playing craps in the alleyway after school, Randy decides to wager money. Putting the probability skills he learned in class to work, he wins big and has enough cash to present to Prez the next day. Prez is not happy that Randy gambled, but orders the bulk candy anyway as promised.

At a faculty meeting, Assistant Principal Marcia Donnelly announces that all teachers, even those in math, will help their students prepare for the reading comprehension portion of the standardized tests coming in the spring. The new material is meant to teach the students how to answer the test questions correctly, but is repetitive and leaves the students unable to grasp any of the language concepts they are supposed to be learning. The sole purpose is to improve the school's test scores. Prez draws a comparison with "juking the stats" in the police department. His class is bored by the new material, and their practice test answers show that none of them understand it. Prez says that he doesn't care about his evaluation and that he is not going to try to teach the reading comprehension test preparation anymore.

=== School pilot program ===
Elsewhere at Tilghman Middle School, the special class presents a teamwork challenge to the "corner kids." They are divided into groups and made to assemble model buildings from kits, with no instructions included. Howard Colvin promises a dinner downtown to the group that builds its model the fastest. Namond, Zenobia, and Darnell build a seemingly sturdy Eiffel Tower, with Namond pocketing the pieces that didn't appear to fit anywhere. Colvin is suspicious, but declares them the winners.

True to his word, Colvin takes the three students to Ruth's Chris Steak House, a high-class establishment by the waterfront. The evening starts well, with Namond appreciating Colvin's Billie Holiday music and the students looking forward to a new experience. But once inside, Darnell and Namond find the atmosphere overwhelming and intimidating and fail to even pretend to grasp the restaurant protocol or enjoy the experience. After they finish dinner and leave the steakhouse disappointed, all three refusing Colvin's offer to take a picture, Darnell asks to go to McDonald's for french fries and Namond cranks up hip-hop on the radio over Colvin's protestations.

The next day, Colvin discusses the experience with Dr. Parenti. He tells him that the students were capable of behaving well and enjoying something new, but reverted to their "corner kid" ways without even realizing it once they felt stifled. He expresses his worry that this lack of self-awareness on the kids' part is a barrier to future progress. Colvin then sees the group boasting to the rest of the students that the dinner was amazing.

=== Kima ===
Kima is surprised and delighted to find how well working overtime in homicide pays. She goes to her old apartment to visit her ex-girlfriend Cheryl and their son, Elijah, and pay her overdue share of housing expenses. Kima states she isn’t hoping they can get back together, but “a deal is a deal,” meaning she’s honouring their parental project even though it fell apart. Just then Cheryl's new partner, a lawyer named Nancine, appears. Kima exits, and Cheryl has Elijah wave goodbye to "Aunt Kima” which he does, distractedly.

=== Marlo ===
Proposition Joe informs Marlo that Herc is now working for the Major Crimes Unit; the same unit that brought down Avon Barksdale and Stringer Bell. He advises Marlo to stop using cell phones. Chris and Snoop have successfully driven off the New York dealers. Chris has learned that Omar is no longer in the city jail. Marlo suggests that the charges against Omar may have been dropped since Andre has closed his shop. Finding Andre is now their top priority. Chris and Snoop break into Andre's house and threaten his girlfriend, who swears she does not know his whereabouts. Marlo's soldiers believe her and decide not to kill her. Andre has gone over to East Baltimore to ask Prop Joe to help him leave town until he is safe from Marlo. Prop Joe offers him $2,000 plus a ride to a northern city, in exchange for Andre's convenience store. Andre says this is undervalued. Prop Joe points out that Andre is not in a position to bargain. When Marlo pays Prop Joe for his package, he expects a discount for dealing with the New York threat. Joe tells him this has already been factored into the cost. Joe, however, indicates to Marlo that "something that you want" is about to be returned at no cost. When Slim Charles drives Andre to one of the vacant houses, Andre protests that Slim Charles was supposed to be his way out. Charles quips "In a manner of speaking, that be true". Chris and Snoop are there with their lye and sheeting. Andre begs Chris to shoot him in a place where his family will find him, but Chris insists that "here is good" and walks Andre up to the house.

=== Omar ===
When Omar is released from the Harford County Detention Center he finds Bunk waiting for him. He demands that Omar promise not to kill anyone in revenge for his false imprisonment. Omar gives his word as his bond. Bunk offers him a ride to the train station, but Omar insists on staying in Baltimore.

Omar and Renaldo wait in their van outside Andre's store, with Omar assuring his boyfriend that he intends to keep his promise to Bunk, but that merely threatening Andre with a gun should be fair game. They leave when it is clear to them that Andre is not there. Omar and Renaldo end up staking out the public square where they know Marlo spends much of his time. They recognize him from the card game they had robbed. Renaldo points out Michael with Marlo, but Omar says that he is just a kid.

=== Michael ===
Michael continues to be disturbed by the return of Bug's father. He shoos Bug from the room when the man enters, and refuses to be touched by him in any way. Michael asks Randy and Dukie what will happen if he calls social services. Randy says they will split him and his brother up and put them in group homes, and won't simply take away Michael's stepdad like he wants.

Michael is escorted by Dukie to Marlo's courtyard and allowed to enter. He tells Marlo that he needs Chris, telling him that "I got a problem I can't bring to no one else."

== Production ==
=== Title reference ===
The kids from Colvin's class find themselves out of place dining at a fancy restaurant, which Colvin worries will stop them from achieving in the world. The title also refers to Carcetti keeping the high-up police in line, as well as Carcetti being challenged by Nerese Campbell in the first budget meeting.

=== Epigraph ===
Might as well dump 'em, get another.

— Proposition Joe

Proposition Joe remarks that instead of trying to repair an object that's broken or defective, it's more cost-effective to just get a new one. This also parallels the fate of Old Face Andre.

=== Credits ===
==== Starring cast ====
Although credited, Dominic West and Glynn Turman do not appear in this episode.

==== Guest stars ====
- Jermaine Crawford as Duquan "Dukie" Weems
- Maestro Harrell as Randy Wagstaff
- Julito McCullum as Namond Brice
- Tristan Wilds as Michael Lee
- Gbenga Akkinagbe as Chris Partlow
- Robert F. Chew as Proposition Joe
- Tray Chaney as Malik "Poot" Carr
- Melanie Nicholls-King as Cheryl
- Delaney Williams as Sergeant Jay Landsman
- Davone Cooper as Darnell Tyson
- Elijah Grant Johnson as Elijah
- Taylor King as Zenobia Dawson
- Jason Wharton as Albert Stokes
- Tyrell Baker as Little Kevin
- Anwan Glover as Slim Charles
- Alfonso Christian Lover as Old Face Andre
- Ramón Rodríguez as Renaldo
- Stacie Davis as Miss Duquette
- Dan DeLuca as Dr. David Parenti
- Tootsie Duvall as Assistant Principal Marcia Donnelly
- Richard Hildebird as Principal Claudell Withers
- Marlyne Afflack as Nerese Campbell
- Cyrus Farmer as Devar Manigault
- Dion Graham as State's Attorney Rupert Bond
- Frederick Strother as State Delegate Odell Watkins
- Keenon Brice as Bug
- Nathan Corbett as Donut
- Dravon James as Mrs. Grace Sampson
- Felicia Pearson as Snoop
- Benjamin Busch as Officer Anthony Colicchio
- Shenia Hatchett as Unknown
- Rick Otto as Detective Kenneth Dozerman
- Rico Sterling as Calvin
- Bobby Brown as Officer Bobby Brown
- Joe DiBlassi as Unknown
- David Goodman as Budget Advisor
- Thomas C. Hessenauer as Middle School Teacher
- Karen Vicks as Gerry
- Amber Nelson as Miss Thiessen

==== Uncredited appearances ====
- Nicole Pettis as Miss Reese
