= Soft Eyes =

- The Wire episode
- Episode no.: Season 4 Episode 2
- Directed by: Christine Moore
- Story by: Ed Burns; David Mills
- Teleplay by: David Mills
- Original air date: September 17, 2006
- Running time: 58 minutes

Episode chronology
← Previous "Boys of Summer"	Next → "Home Rooms"

"Soft Eyes" is the second episode of the fourth season of the HBO original series The Wire. Written by David Mills from a story by Ed Burns & David Mills, and directed by Christine Moore, it originally aired on September 17, 2006.

== Plot ==
At City Hall, Herc stumbles across Mayor Royce receiving oral sex from his secretary. Concerned for his career, Herc approaches Carver for advice about the situation, but Carver says the problem is beyond his pay grade and suggests they take it to Major Stan Valchek, who has more experience with politics. Valchek meets with Herc and reassures him that he could climb in rank if he keeps quiet about the incident, and can use the information against Royce if the mayor moves to punish him. Wilson visits Carcetti's house and finds him playing Battleship with his daughter, having assumed he has already lost the race for mayor. Carcetti meets with members of the Fraternal Order of Police, who admit that they are reluctant to endorse him with Royce leading in the polls. Carcetti convinces them to hold back their active support for Royce. As they leave, Valchek tells him that he achieved the best outcome possible under the circumstances. Wilson urges Carcetti to prepare for his debate with Royce, but the candidate remains pessimistic. Royce considers moving Herc out of his security detail and checks with Parker to see if he has friends high up in the department.

In prison, Namond and his mother De'Londa visit his father Wee-Bey, who asks how Namond's work with Bodie is progressing; De'Londa threatens to withhold money for Namond's school supplies if he doesn't commit himself to Bodie. Back in the neighborhood, Namond and Michael ask if the latter and his younger brother can work for Bodie to earn money for school supplies. When Bodie refuses to employ them both, Namond suggests that Michael could take his job until he has the funds he needs. Carver and Bunk drive up, still looking for Lex; Bodie promises to contact them if he sees Lex, knowing that he is probably dead. While Namond and Michael meet their friends, Stanfield lieutenant Monk Metcalf arrives and hands out money for school supplies. When Michael refuses to accept the money, Marlo confronts Michael and is impressed by his defiance. Donut pulls up in a stolen SUV, but the boys are spotted by Carver and forced to flee. Randy is caught by Officer Eddie Walker, who confiscates his money for school. Carver warns the boys against stealing more cars. Namond returns home to find that his mother has laid out new clothes for him despite her threats.

Bunk pressures Lex's mother to give up her son's whereabouts, believing that Lex has fled from the police. Back at Homicide, Norris investigates what turns out to be the murder of a state's witness; Sergeant Jay Landsman informs Valchek about the case. At the MCU, Freamon prepares to serve subpoenas on political figures in connection with the Barksdale investigation. Sydnor and Pearlman are both worried that the move will hurt their careers. Pearlman realizes that Freamon played her by holding the investigation until now and that he lied when he said it was pushed back by fresh cases. Freamon serves developer Andy Krawczyk and State Senator Clay Davis, which are delivered by Greggs and Sydnor respectively. Davis and Krawczyk threaten to withhold financial support from Royce, who in turn puts pressure on Commissioner Ervin Burrell. Burrell and Deputy Commissioner William Rawls realize that Freamon is the cause of the problem, with Rawls resolving to find a way to remove Freamon from the MCU. Freamon and Greggs catch Marlo's voice on the wire and, knowing that his crew has not been linked to any violence, wonder why they hear what sounds like target practice in the background.

At his gym, Dennis "Cutty" Wise continues to train one-time drug dealer Justin, who is preparing for an upcoming bout. Cutty is approached by the mothers of multiple students who hope to get a date with him. Cutty pays special attention to Michael, who fights with Justin after he interrupts his time using the heavy bag with Namond. Cutty breaks up the boys and offers to personally train Michael, but he declines. Meanwhile, Bubbles and his young protégé Sherrod continue to make their living selling goods from a shopping cart. Sherrod struggles to add up the price of their wares and Bubbles criticizes him for his poor math skills. Bubbles tries to hide his drug use from Sherrod, who is worried about Bubbles' criticism and tells him that he is willing to go back to school. In preparation for the school year, Prez cleans up his classroom and meets with the other teachers to discuss maintaining class rules. Assistant Principal Donnelly tasks one of her students, Crystal Judkins, to deliver secondhand school supplies to Dukie. Bubbles and Sherrod come to the school to discuss possible enrollment for Sherrod; Bubbles has a moment of recognition as he passes Prez.

Despite being distracted, Carcetti is able to come up with effective answers as part of his debate preparation. He gets a visit from Valchek and is told about the death of the witness, giving him useful ammunition against Royce. During the televised debate, both Carcetti's campaign team and the Homicide unit watch as Carcetti rebuts Royce's assertion that Baltimore's crime rate has fallen by bringing up the murdered witness. Royce's response is labored, defensive, awkward, and evasive; Carcetti's team is pleased while Royce's people seem worried. Burrell and Rawls become nervous about their failure to inform the mayor about the murder.

== Production ==
Simon has commented that the influx of child actors initially caused some problems on set and said that crew members' feelings mirrored the turmoil of Prez in the episode because of the young actors' behavior. However, by the end of filming they became a good crew of young actors.

=== Title reference ===
The title is a mysterious piece of advice that a colleague gives Prez about teaching ("You need soft eyes"). In the later episode "Refugees" that expression is used again and explained by Bunk Moreland. In terms of the title, the meaning of soft eyes means the ability to look deeper than what you first see.

=== Epigraph ===
I still wake up white in a city that ain't.

— Carcetti, in Soft Eyes

Carcetti makes this statement when worrying about his chances in the upcoming election being hamstrung by his race. In 2000, Baltimore's population was 31% white.

=== Credits ===
==== Starring cast ====
Although credited, Michael K. Williams, Robert Wisdom and Dominic West do not appear in this episode. This is the first episode of the series not to feature West.

==== Guest stars ====
1. Isiah Whitlock, Jr. as Senator Clayton "Clay" Davis
2. Jermaine Crawford as Duquan "Dukie" Weems
3. Maestro Harrell as Randy Wagstaff
4. Julito McCullum as Namond Brice
5. Tristan Wilds as Michael Lee
6. Gbenga Akinnagbe as Chris Partlow
7. Hassan Johnson as Roland "Wee-Bey" Brice
8. Ed Norris as Detective Ed Norris
9. Delaney Williams as Sergeant Jay Landsman
10. Brian Anthony Wilson as Detective Vernon Holley
11. Megan Anderson as Jen Carcetti
12. Tootsie Duvall as Assistant Principal Marcia Donnelly
13. Joilet F. Harris as Officer Caroline Massey
14. Dravon James as Mrs. Grace Sampson
15. Justin Burley as Justin
16. Nathan Corbett as Donut
17. Edward Green as Spider
18. Rashad Orange as Sherrod
19. Brandy Burre as Theresa D'Agostino
20. Sheila Gaskins as Mrs. Anderson
21. Johnett Kent as Sharon Jones
22. Nikki Lusk as Unknown
23. Stacie Williams as Gail
24. Al Brown as Stanislaus Valchek
25. Christopher Mann as Councilman Anthony Gray
26. Cleo Reginald Pizana as Chief of Staff Coleman Parker
27. Marc Steiner as himself (Debate Moderator)
28. Frederick Strother as State Delegate Odell Watkins
29. Tamieka Chavis as Royce's Assistant
30. Destiny Jackson-Evans as Crystal Judkins
31. Sandi McCree as De'Londa Brice
32. Kwame Patterson as Monk Metcalf
33. Felicia Pearson as Snoop
34. Jonnie Louis Brown as Officer Eddie Walker
35. Eugene Little as Landscaping Crew Chief
36. Alfonso Christian Lover as Old Face Andre
37. Jason Parker as Officer Reggie Leddett
38. Michael Willis as Andy Krawczyk

==== Uncredited appearances ====
- Diana Villamonte as Mrs Rachel Shapiro
- Demetria Bailey as Mrs Perlene Scott
- Karen Vicks as Gerry
- Peter DeFeo as Election Official
- Pamela Fischer as Campaign Supporter
- Patrick McDade as Bobby - FOP president
- Richard Cutting as Lieutenant
- Chester West as Shift Lieutenant Dent
- Usman Sharif as drug dealer
- Unknown as Tote
- Dolly Turner as "Burnout" or Ms Hanson - older African American veteran teacher

==== First appearances ====
- De'Londa Brice: Namond's materialistic and greedy mother who raises him with money from what remains of the Barksdale organization. A former club girl whom Wee-Bey impregnated, she is only being given the money she is due to Wee-Bey, who is serving prison time on the Barksdales' behalf.
- Crystal Judkins: Hard-working and responsible eighth grade student.

=== Writing ===
This is the first episode of the series in which series creator David Simon is not credited with the teleplay or story, as he collaborated on the stories for all the previous episodes and is credited with the "story by" credit. There are only nine episodes (out of 60) in the entire series in which he does not receive a writing credit, all of which are in the fourth season. Ed Burns receives story credit on all Season Four episodes, as the writing drew extensively on his experience as a teacher.
