= Home Rooms =

- The Wire episode
- Episode no.: Season 4 Episode 3
- Directed by: Seith Mann
- Story by: Ed Burns; Richard Price
- Teleplay by: Richard Price
- Original air date: September 24, 2006
- Running time: 58 minutes

Episode chronology
← Previous "Soft Eyes"	Next → "Refugees"

"Home Rooms" is the third episode of the fourth season of the HBO original series The Wire. Written by Richard Price from a story by Ed Burns & Richard Price, and directed by Seith Mann, it originally aired on September 24, 2006.

== Plot ==
Mayor Royce meets with Burrell to discuss the murdered witness, which Carcetti has used to gain on him in the polls. Royce decides to use city resources to harass Carcetti's campaign. He also orders that State's Attorney Steven Demper downplay the victim's role as a witness to the press, and threatens to drop him from the ticket when he questions the demands. State Delegate Odell Watkins criticizes Royce for his failure to fund a witness protection scheme. Royce still refuses to let it go ahead because Carcetti was involved in planning it and would politically benefit if it were properly funded. Elsewhere, Royce recommends to Burrell that Herc be promoted to sergeant in exchange for Herc's silence about his affair. At the funeral of the witness, Carcetti greets Marla Daniels. Against Wilson's advice, Carcetti does not address the press, deciding that the perceived restraint will make a stronger positive impression on Watkins and Daniels.

Bunk visits McNulty and Beadie for dinner; McNulty reluctantly goes for drinks with Bunk. Bodie is visited by Marlo, who gives him an ultimatum: start selling Marlo's product, or give up his corner to one of Marlo's crews. Marlo recognizes Michael and asks Partlow to find out more about him. Bodie also takes an interest in Michael and tries to convince him to stay with his crew instead of going back to school. Michael walks away without answering. Bodie later tells Slim Charles that he has decided to fight Marlo for control of the corner, even without backup. Meanwhile, the New Day Co-Op realizes they face two problems: Marlo is expanding his empire, and drug dealers from New York City are encroaching on the territory in East Baltimore. The Co-Op agrees to strike against the New York dealers and consider including Marlo in the effort. Slim Charles warns Proposition Joe that he is unlikely to be successful negotiating with Marlo, given Stringer Bell's previous failure to make him see reason.

As Omar makes his way to buy cereal, lookouts announce his progress and drug dealers flee. On his way home, a frightened dealer drops his stash from a window. Omar reflects that he doesn't want the drugs because there was no effort required to take them, and worries that taking easy targets will eventually make him soft. While staking out a corner shop, Omar spots Greggs photographing the owner, Old Face Andre. Both observers notice a drug resupply being delivered by a man with a child in school uniform. After Greggs leaves, Omar and Renaldo stick up Old Face Andre. At the MCU, Freamon has linked Old Face Andre to Marlo through the wiretap, and hopes to tie him to other Stanfield lieutenants. Rawls appoints Lieutenant Charles Marimow as the new head of the unit, who demands that the Stanfield wiretap be shut down. Freamon confronts Rawls and is forced to accept a transfer to Homicide. When Greggs considers transferring to Daniels' district, Daniels meets with Rawls and asks him to consider moving her to Homicide as well.

Howard "Bunny" Colvin, the former commander of the Western District, has a new job as head of security at a hotel. The Deacon tells Colvin that the University of Maryland has been awarded a grant to study repeat violent offenders and seek a street-wise agent to act as liaison to potential subjects. Colvin is initially not interested. Later, Colvin leaves his job at the hotel when the manager refuses to let him turn in a guest for assaulting a prostitute. Colvin approaches the Deacon and is introduced to the head of the study, Dr. David Parenti, who hopes to enlist Colvin as a field researcher recruiting subjects. Feeling that the age of Parenti's targeted age group is too high, Colvin takes him to interview a prisoner at the Western DEU, Shaun Williams. Williams attacks Parenti during the interview, forcing him to acknowledge that his age group is probably "too seasoned." Colvin takes Parenti to the middle school where Prez teaches and, seeing how out of control the children are, persuades the academic to study them instead.

On their way to school, Randy, Dukie, Michael, and Bug visit Namond's house to pick him up. Randy's home room teacher is Prez, who he believes to be out of his depth. Prez quickly finds that most of the students are uninterested and disruptive, and has to break up a fight between two girls, Chiquan and Laetitia. As he tidies up at the end of his first day, he finds notes on a math problem showing that at least one of his students followed his material. The following day, while Prez is trying to present a different math problem, Laetitia attacks Chiquan with a razor, horrifying Randy.

== Production ==
=== Title reference ===
The title refers to the homeroom classes as the children begin the new school year. Also, this episode shows the home lives of both Omar Little and Jimmy McNulty. In this episode, Kima Greggs and Lester Freamon also search for homes in the police department.

=== Epigraph ===
I love the first day, man. Everybody all friendly an' shit.

— Namond Brice

Namond Brice remarking how people tend to be more friendly than usual on the first day of school. The epigraph could also be a reference to Lieutenant Marimow's first day as commander of the Major Crimes Unit.

=== Miscellanea ===
- Renaldo is shown reading the novel Drama City by George Pelecanos (a writer for the show).

=== Credits ===
==== Starring cast ====
Although credited, Deirdre Lovejoy, Andre Royo, and Chad L. Coleman do not appear in this episode.

==== Guest stars ====
1. Amy Ryan as Beatrice "Beadie" Russell
2. Jermaine Crawford as Duquan "Dukie" Weems
3. Maestro Harrell as Randy Wagstaff
4. Julito McCullum as Namond Brice
5. Tristan Wilds as Michael Lee
6. Gbenga Akinnagbe as Chris Partlow
7. Robert F. Chew as Proposition Joe
8. Anwan Glover as Slim Charles
9. Melvin Williams as Deacon
10. Tootsie Duvall as Assistant Principal Marcia Donnelly
11. Dravon James as Mrs. Grace Sampson
12. Dan DeLuca as Dr. David Parenti
13. Boris McGiver as Lieutenant Charlie Marimow
14. Gene Terinoni as Lieutenant Jimmy Asher
15. Daniel Lee Robertson. III as Shaun Williams
16. Maria Broom as Marla Daniels
17. Brandy Burre as Theresa D'Agostino
18. Cleo Reginald Pizana as Chief of Staff Coleman Parker
19. Frederick Strother as State Delegate Odell Watkins
20. Tiffani Aisha Holland as Chiquan
21. Alfonso Christian Lover as Old Face Andre
22. Charmaine McPhee as Laetitia
23. Ramón Rodríguez as Renaldo

==== Uncredited appearances ====
- Doug Roberts as State's Attorney Steven Demper
- Sandi McCree as De'Londa Brice
- Felicia Pearson as Snoop
- Destiny Jackson-Evans as Crystal Judkins
- Jeffrey Lorenzo as Karim Williams
- Davone Cooper as Darnell Tyson
- Jason Wharton as Albert Stokes
- Corbin Smith as Monell
- Keenon Brice as Bug
- Rakiya Orange as Charlene Young
- Darrell M. Smith as School Officer Turner
- Nitian Adsul as Indian Shop Owner
- Tamieka Chavis as Royce's Assistant
- Ed Moran as Hotel House Detective
- Clay Steakley as Assistant Hotel Manager
- Tyrell Baker as Little Kevin
- Troj Strickland as Fat Face Rick
- Duane Chandler Rawlings as Hungry Man
- Connor Aikin as Jack - Beadie's Son
- Sophia Ayoud as Cary - Beadie's Daughter
- Unknown as Kintell Williamson
- Unknown as Reesy
- Unknown as Kwanese
- Unknown as Paul
- Unknown as Tyrell

=== First appearances ===
- Old Face Andre: Westside corner store owner who operates a drug package for Marlo Stanfield out of his store.
- Lieutenant Charlie Marimow: caustic commander with a reputation as a "unit killer" who is the replacement commander of the Major Case Unit.
- Dr. David Parenti: University of Maryland academic who is planning a pilot study targeting repeat violent offenders.
- Albert Stokes: a short, overweight, and foul mouthed eighth grade student in Prez's late math class.
- Darnell Tyson: eighth grade student in Prez's math class with a drinking problem.
- Karim Williams: eighth grade student in Prez's math class who is friends with Randy and Namond.
- Renaldo: Omar's new boyfriend.
- Bug: Michael's half-brother.
