= A New Day (The Wire) =

- The Wire episode
- Episode no.: Season 4 Episode 11
- Directed by: Brad Anderson
- Story by: David Simon; Ed Burns
- Teleplay by: Ed Burns
- Original air date: November 26, 2006
- Running time: 58 minutes

Episode chronology
← Previous "Misgivings"	Next → "That's Got His Own"

"A New Day" is the 11th episode of the fourth season of the HBO original series The Wire (2002-2008). The episode was written by Ed Burns from a story by David Simon and Ed Burns and was directed by Brad Anderson. It originally aired on November 26, 2006.

== Plot ==
=== Western district ===
Namond Brice buys Chinese takeout for Michael Lee, Randy Wagstaff and Duquan "Dukie" Weems. Sitting on a stoop with Donut, they discuss the recent murder of Little Kevin. Randy is dismayed to learn of Kevin's death. Officer Walker walks by and tells the boys to move on, accusing them of waiting to rob a passer-by. The boys plan revenge on Walker for his brutal assault on Donut. Michael says he knows of a bar that is well known as a police hangout that Walker frequents, and he vows to handle the problem. Although Namond, Randy and Dukie express doubts, Michael does not hesitate. As Walker leaves the bar, Duquan scratches Walker's car, luring Walker to chase him. In an alley, Michael confronts Walker with a gun, ordering Walker to turn around and kneel. He takes the ring that Walker is wearing, then gives a signal to Namond, who douses Walker with yellow paint.

Walker lies to his fellow officers, saying that there were three attackers with shotguns. He characterizes the incident as a declaration of war. McNulty is disbelieving. When he goes for lunch, McNulty finds Bodie Broadus in a diner. Bodie explains that police activity has driven him indoors. McNulty tells him that the assault on Walker has riled the patrol officers. He confides a dislike of Walker to Bodie because of his corrupt nature. McNulty takes a call and the two joke together as he leaves.

=== Bubbles ===
Sherrod returns to Bubbles' garage. Bubbles checks how long Sherrod is staying and then offers him food. Sherrod confesses that he owes money to the drug dealer he was working for and admits he felt out of place working on the corner. Bubbles promises to help sort out the problem and reassures Sherrod that he is home again.

Sherrod and Bubbles go to work the next day. Bubbles is enthusiastic about having Sherrod back and is pleased when they find a toppled street light they can sell for scrap. Their day takes a turn for the worse when the addict who has been tormenting Bubbles robs them again.

=== Politics ===
Reverend Frank Reid and the minister who was accosted by Sergeant Thomas "Herc" Hauk attend a meeting with Mayor Tommy Carcetti to complain about Herc's actions. They try to persuade Carcetti to introduce a civilian review board for police complaints. Norman Wilson reminds them that with African Americans as commissioner and Internal Investigations Division commander, the racial aspects of the incident will not go unexamined. The ministers respond by stating that they believe Commissioner Ervin Burrell's authority has been limited. Carcetti asks the ministers not to prejudge the investigation of the complaint and tells them he takes the matter seriously. They leave disappointed, but thank the mayor for keeping an open door. After the ministers leave, Wilson and Carcetti discuss the difficulty of their position; if Carcetti fires Herc, then the rank and file of the police department will be upset, but leniency will upset the black political infrastructure. Carcetti refers to the situation as his "first bowl of shit," alluding to the anecdote shared with him by a former mayor.

Colonel Cedric Daniels and ASA Rhonda Pearlman host a meeting with the homicide unit. They ask for suggestions to pass on to the new mayor and state's attorney. Detective Crutchfield suggests improved witness protection and a pay raise; the latter idea is greeted with much enthusiasm from the other detectives. Detective Freamon asks for more proactive investigation and more time for case prep. Detective Norris suggests greater investment in lab work and technicians. Detective Greggs is exhilarated at the prospect of "a new day", but Sergeant Landsman is skeptical.

Wilson meets with Deputy Commissioner of Operations William Rawls and gives him a memo from Carcetti asking for community-based policing and high-end police work. Rawls asks Wilson about firing Burrell. Wilson explains that they do not have the political capital available, which is compounded by the situation with the ministers. Rawls asks if they want Herc fired, and Wilson tells him they do not want to interfere with the day-to-day running of the department. Rawls confirms that the new administration is interested in the perception of the investigation and recommends assigning the task to Daniels as Herc's new commanding officer.

Rawls meets with Daniels and passes him the investigation. He tells Daniels that in minor cases, Daniels can issue a summary judgment or pass the case to a trial board. Daniels asks Rawls what City Hall would want, and to Daniels' surprise, Rawls tells him to do the right thing.

The following morning, Carcetti visits the Department of Public Works and tells them to tow an abandoned vehicle that he noticed. He does not offer the location of the vehicle. This galvanizes the department into action. He offers similar instructions to the Department of Parks and Recreation, telling them that a constituent called and asked them to clean up a hazardous playground in her area, but again, he does not reveal a location. He repeats the trick at the water department. All three departments initiate a flurry of activity soon afterwards.

Senator Davis and Burrell play golf and discuss the summary judgment Daniels has issued. Burrell believes the punishment of two weeks' extra duty is too lenient for the ministers. Burrell arrogantly suggests that he is the only person who knows how to play the game.

Carcetti has a disappointing budget meeting and learns that it will be difficult to muster the funds he needs to re-energize the police department.

Rawls introduces the policy change to his commanders and is met with pessimism from the patrol division commander. Rawls insists that they follow the mayor's orders. Daniels approaches Rawls after the meeting to request reconstitution of the Major Crimes Unit under his command in the Criminal Investigations Division. Rawls approves Daniels' suggestion. Deputy Commissioner of Administration Stan Valchek tells Rawls that he is smart to support Daniels, as he is likely to be the next commissioner. Rawls is surprised at the assertion, thinking that he himself would be next in line. Amused, Valchek tells Rawls there is no way he could become commissioner given Baltimore's African American majority, and points to Daniels's rapid promotions as evidence of his grooming.

Daniels then meets with Freamon, suggesting that Freamon return to Major Crimes. Freamon is concerned about Marimow leading the unit, but Daniels responds by allowing Freamon to pick his own people and his own commander, concluding that, as far as Daniels is concerned, Freamon is the Major Crimes Unit. Freamon returns to the unit headquarters and reviews the subpoenaed evidence that has been collected in his absence. As Freamon looks at the names on the subpoenas, Carcetti is at a fundraising event with those very same people: Andy Krawczyk, Ed Bowers, Maurice Webber, and Clay Davis.

Carcetti meets with the Western District patrol officers and announces the officer pay raise and the new focus on community-based policing, to much enthusiasm. McNulty is dubious of Carcetti's commitment to avoiding stat-based policing, but Carcetti insists that, if the current command cannot meet his request, he will replace them.

Burrell arrives at the mayor's office, and Carcetti reluctantly agrees to see him. Burrell tells Carcetti that he does not mind his orders about strategy being countermanded and segues into a discussion about Herc's punishment. He reveals that Daniels is planning to recommend sensitivity training and tells Carcetti that they will need to be more severe for the ministers. Showing the lengthy police code handbook, Burrell tells Carcetti that he can find a more convincing reason to fire Herc that will appease both the ministers and the rank and file, intimating that he can still have value to the Carcetti administration.

Carcetti meets with the department heads and hears reports of how they have acted on his requests for cleanup. He continues to encourage the public works department by claiming they have not resolved the complaint he received, but congratulates the water department head when he reports that all hydrants are capped. When the heads of the water and public works departments leave, Carcetti is given some bad news: his budget adviser has just learned that the school system is running a deficit of $54 million. Carcetti is stupefied.

=== School ===
Roland "Prez" Pryzbylewski takes his class through a lesson about measurements. He tries to help Charlene and Jasmine in halving an odd number, but is interrupted by disruptive behavior.

As per usual, Randy tries to sell candy to some younger students during lunch. However, the students abandon him, as rumors about Randy snitching to the police continue to spread.

In the special class, Miss Duquette asks about examples of courage. The class had already identified examples from life on the corner. Miss Duquette asks for examples unrelated to the corner, and none are forthcoming. She asks for a volunteer for a trust fall exercise. Albert Stokes declines, but Namond reluctantly agrees once the exercise has been explained, and Colvin has gestured his support. Miss Duquette returns to Albert once Namond has successfully completed the task. He responds with profanity and walks out of the class. Mr. Colvin follows Albert and takes him aside with the new social worker, Miss Rennert. They ask Albert what is wrong, and he reveals that he discovered his mother's dead body after returning home last night. Despite Albert's desire to stay with his mother, his grandmother decided to send him to school.

Namond tells Colvin about the attack on Officer Walker, although he neglects to mention that he was part of it. Colvin tells Namond that he is making good progress and suggests that he is nearly ready to return to normal classes. However, Namond is reluctant to go back.

After school, Randy is attacked by several of his classmates. Michael refuses to leave Randy's side despite the accusations about him working with the police. Dukie flees to get help. Prez breaks up the fight and brings Randy and his friends into his classroom. He quizzes Randy about what happened and recommends that he not talk to the police in the future.

Later, Namond questions Michael about his reckless behavior, both in removing his mask in front of Walker and getting involved in the fight. Michael refuses to apologize for either action. The next morning, Namond considers cutting his distinctive hair. He decides that he is still not ready, but is verbally threatened by his mother to cut his hair to make himself less identifiable to the police. He instead decides to achieve the same effect by braiding his hair. He questions Kenard about the appropriateness of his new braided hairstyle as they work on the corner. Namond is approached by Michael's mother for a handout, claiming that it is for a friend. He accepts her story and is reprimanded by Kenard.

Prez visits Sergeant Carver and accuses him of betraying his trust by endangering Randy. Carver tells Prez that he will have a plainclothes unit assigned to guard Randy's home and promises to find out how Randy was exposed.

Assistant Principal Donnelly hosts a meeting with five eighth-grade students, including Dukie and Monell, and announces that they are moving on to the ninth grade and high school at the end of the marking period. Dukie is dejected at the news. When the students leave, Donnelly meets with Colvin to tell him that the board has called an end to the special class program.

Colvin, Parenti, and Donnelly meet with Miss Sheperdson and her supervisor at the school board. They make the case for the program, but are told that the school system is under too much scrutiny at the moment. The school board advises that they will only continue the program with approval from City Hall.

=== Omar ===
Omar and Renaldo are following Slim Charles. Renaldo questions the logic of waiting at the same place where they lost Slim before. Omar reassures Renaldo that if Slim does not return, they will start again tomorrow by following him from his home. Omar is proven right when Slim drives past in his SUV. They tail him to a meeting with Proposition Joe. Omar is astounded that Slim is linked with both Marlo and Prop Joe. Omar follows Proposition Joe to a meeting of the New Day Co-Op. He notices Fatface Rick and Marlo arriving and speculates that the Baltimore drug dealers have put all their eggs in one basket.

With weapons drawn, Omar visits Proposition Joe at his electrical repair store. He finds Joe meeting with Cheese and Slim Charles. Omar accuses Joe of lying to him about the card game. He enlists Joe's help in stealing from Marlo and threatens to inform Marlo of his involvement in the card game robbery if he attempts to double-cross him. When they leave the store, Renaldo asks Omar if he trusts Joe. Omar tells him that he trusts Prop Joe's fear. They follow Cheese when he leaves the store.

=== Stanfield Organization ===
Marlo Stanfield commends Chris and Snoop for being up to date on their work. When Snoop confirms that they took care of Michael's problem, Marlo comments that he has heard that Michael stood alongside Randy when he was accused of being an informant. Chris is stunned by the news.

=== Homicide ===
Bunk Moreland and Kima Greggs tease Lester Freamon about his return to Major Crimes as he packs up his desk. Carver arrives and questions Bunk about Randy. Bunk tells Carver that Herc did not pass Randy to him. Both men realize that Herc is to blame. When Bunk and Freamon quiz Herc about Randy, he claims that Randy had no useful information, but Bunk is not mollified. Freamon mediates the discussion and asks Herc to tell him everything he did while working on the case. He learns about Herc's traffic stop of Chris and Snoop and the discovery of their nailgun.

Bunk and Freamon visit Prez at the school. They explain that they went to see Randy, but, per Prez's advice, he would not talk to them. Bunk tells Prez that he is siding with the criminals; Prez asserts that he is looking out for his kids. Freamon is diplomatic and wishes Prez well. Bunk asks Prez for a little information, and Prez reports Randy's story about telling Lex to meet a girl at the playground. Bunk and Freamon investigate the playground. The surrounding vacant homes pique Freamon's interest. Bunk watches in silence as Freamon does his work. Freamon investigates the boarded-up homes and discovers that some have been sealed with plywood and screws. Others are loosely boarded up with rusty old screws. Freamon notices that one door in particular has been newly and tightly sealed by a nail gun. He realizes that the vacant apartments have been used as makeshift tombs to stash dead bodies.

== Production ==
=== Title reference ===
The title is spoken by Detective Greggs in reference to the new mayor's plans for the city. It may also refer to the New Day Co-Op where Proposition Joe conducts business.

=== Epigraph ===
You play in dirt, you get dirty.

— McNulty

McNulty uses this phrase to explain his dislike of Officer Walker to Bodie and his feeling that Walker got what he deserved. This can also refer to the consequences of Proposition Joe's actions in bringing Marlo into the New Day Co-Op (i.e. Omar and company making plans to rob the next shipment).

=== Credits ===
==== Starring cast ====
Although credited, Chad L. Coleman, Glynn Turman, and Corey Parker Robinson do not appear in this episode.

==== Guest stars ====
- Isiah Whitlock, Jr. as Senator Clayton "Clay" Davis
- Jermaine Crawford as Duquan "Dukie" Weems
- Maestro Harrell as Randy Wagstaff
- Julito McCullum as Namond Brice
- Tristan Wilds as Michael Lee
- Gbenga Akinnagbe as Chris Partlow
- Robert F. Chew as Proposition Joe
- Anwan Glover as Slim Charles
- Method Man as Calvin "Cheese" Wagstaff
- Al Brown as Major Stan Valchek
- Jay Landsman as Lieutenant Dennis Mello
- Delaney Williams as Sergeant Jay Landsman
- Jonnie Louis Brown as Officer Eddie Walker
- Rashad Orange as Sherrod
- Ramón Rodríguez as Renaldo
- Thuliso Dingwall as Kenard
- Rakiya Orange as Charlene Young
- Jason Wharton as Albert Stokes
- Stacie Davis as Miss Duquette
- Dan DeLuca as Dr. David Parenti
- Tootsie Duvall as Assistant Principal Marcia Donnelly
- Sandi McCree as De'Londa Brice
- Felicia Pearson as Felicia "Snoop" Pearson
- Franklin Ojeda Smith as Reverend
- Felix Stevenson as Reverend Frank Reid
- Ed Norris as Detective Ed Norris
- Michael Salconi as Officer Michael Santangelo
- Gregory L. Williams as Detective Michael Crutchfield
- Brian Anthony Wilson as Detective Vernon Holley
- Yolanda Gaskins as School Board Representative
- David Goodman as Budget Advisor
- Mark Joy as Ed Bowers
- Michael Willis as Andy Krawczyk
- Nathan Corbett as Donut
- DeAnte McCullough as Unknown
- Michael Norbin as Unknown
- Jasmine Pitts as Unknown
- Corbin Smith as Monell

==== Uncredited appearances ====
- Derek Horton as Officer Brian Baker
- Bobby Brown as Officer Bobby Brown
- Davone Cooper as Darnell Tyson
- Taylor King as Zenobia Dawson
- Na'Dria Jennings as Chandra Porter
- Shamika Cotton as Raylene Lee
- Shelia Cutchlow as Miss Sheperdson
- Michael Coley as Kwame
- Traeauna Harris as Unknown
- Unknown as Latonya
- Unknown as Markeith
- Unknown as Miss
- Joey Odoms as Lead Bully
