= Corner Boys =

- The Wire episode
- Episode no.: Season 4 Episode 8
- Directed by: Agnieszka Holland
- Story by: Ed Burns; Richard Price
- Teleplay by: Richard Price
- Original air date: November 5, 2006
- Running time: 58 minutes

Episode chronology
← Previous "Unto Others"	Next → "Know Your Place"

"Corner Boys" is the eighth episode of the fourth season of the HBO original series The Wire. Written by Richard Price from a story by Ed Burns & Richard Price, and directed by Agnieszka Holland, it originally aired on November 5, 2006.

== Plot ==
=== School ===
Prez takes his second class of the day. He sets them a problem requiring division of apples between people. Randy is distracted by his classmate Calvin. Prez asks Calvin the answer and Calvin guesses correctly. He explains his rationale to the class: when going through the problem with the previous class, Prez tapped the correct answer several times, leaving chalk marks around it. After school Randy walks home with Michael and his younger brother Bug. Michael quizzes Randy about how he was able to return to school and Randy keeps quiet about his involvement with the police. Michael warns him about getting involved with authority figures.

The next day Prez takes his class through their state mathematics test. Calvin and Charlene struggle with the change in the particulars from their practice work but Dukie is able to apply the skills he learned to the new problem. When he tries to explain it to Charlene she storms out of the classroom. Colvin continues his discussion of what makes a good corner boy with the special class. Namond and Kwame are emphatic about the need to prevent your people stealing from you because otherwise their thieving will spiral out of control. Zenobia is insistent that a beating for anyone caught is the way to prevent stealing. Colvin asks why the beating is necessary and Darnell and Markeith tell him that someone is always watching on the street and you cannot appear to be weak.

Namond tells Randy and Michael about the discussion on their way home from school. When De'Londa catches her son Namond working on his package in his bedroom she angrily tells him that the police could seize their house if the drugs are found there and insists he hand the task on to a lieutenant.

Michael gets home to find that his mother has sold his groceries for drug money. She threatens to take the DSS card from him. He insists on keeping the card. The next day, when Michael gets home from the gym, Bug tells him that his father has returned. Michael is dismayed and repulsed when the man goes to touch him. He confronts his mother, telling her that she has broken her promise by allowing Bug's father to return. She is unconcerned and tells Michael that things are going back to the way they were. Michael is stunned and his mother says that Bug's father will now hold the DSS card.

The next day an energized Namond raises the hypocrisy of a system that promises to reward him for good behavior when it fails to live by its own rules much of the time; he states steroids, liquor, cigarettes and Enron as examples. Darnell points out that even Colvin's police work focused on drugs, so in a way, drugs paid Colvin's salary. Zenobia claims that the street life is just part of the larger system. Prez discusses his class's difficulty with the test with his colleagues. They reassure him that performance is low across all subjects. Hanson and Shapiro tell him he must follow the curriculum. Sampson and Hanson offer typical sage advice: Prez's first year as a teacher has to be less about the children and more about him surviving.

At lunch, Prez watches Dukie show Crystal and her friends how to shop for jewelry on the internet. He notices that Michael is despondent at the back of the class. Prez asks if Michael is okay, but Michael hesitantly declines to confide in him. Prez leaves his offer open and suggests that Michael could talk to the school social worker. Michael goes to pick Bug up after school but learns from Miss Ella that his father has already taken him. Michael runs out of the school after them. He finds Bug doing homework with his father and pulls Bug away from him.

Parenti, Colvin and the special class teacher discuss their progress. The academics are impressed with their results but have noticed that some of the children are not participating — those with deeper problems in particular. Parenti wonders whether they can convince the corner kids to take an interest in subjects beyond drug dealing.

Namond gives his package to Kenard and tells him that he is a lieutenant and warns him not to cheat him on the profits. Namond delivers his takings to his mother and she notices that he has made less than she would expect from a full package. He blames his territory, so she goes to tackle Bodie about territory.

=== Homicide ===
Landsman briefs his squad before their shift. He introduces them to Carcetti, who is observing them. He announces the death of Foerster and that the wake will be that evening. When Carcetti pours the last of the coffee, Greggs angrily insists that he should make another pot; she is hostile towards Carcetti because of the political interference in the Braddock case. Carcetti asks the detectives to continue as usual. Greggs, Freamon and Landsman immediately stop pretending to work. They tell Carcetti that things are different when they have a body. Bunk tries to convince Holley and Crutchfield to revisit the scene of the shooting for which Omar has been arrested. They remain resistant to his efforts to get them to reopen the case. Carcetti approaches them and remarks on the caseload they face. Crutchfield becomes more enraged with Bunk's attempts to go back on the case, thinking that he is doing so to discredit Crutchfield's clearance. After Crutchfield leaves, Bunk appeals to Holley to look over the scene one more time.

At Foerster's wake in the bar, Bunk is so drunk he runs outside to vomit. Upon returning, he is disgusted to find Jimmy McNulty drinking club soda. The next day Holley accompanies Bunk to their witness, Andre, who retells the story to Bunk. Bunk finds it hard to believe that Andre would leave the bulletproof area when only threatened by a 9mm handgun. Andre explains that he was trying to save the delivery woman's life and he did not find time to report it. Bunk asks Andre to come to the office with them, but he refuses. Bunk claims that Andre's "whole story's fucked" as it makes no sense for Andre to have survived the robbery as a live witness. Bunk convinces Holley that Andre ran a con on the police. Bunk returns to Andre's store with a grand jury summons, finding him talking with a prostitute named Dee-Dee before bringing him in. Andre is warned that lying to the grand jury is a much more serious charge than lying to the police. When Bunk and Holley deliver the news to Landsman, he is enraged that he has lost a clearance thanks to Bunk's interference.

=== Major crimes ===
Lieutenant Charlie Marimow castigates Herc having just received a harassment complaint. The complaint is from the woman who was stopped with Marlo. Herc claims he was tipped by a confidential informant. Marimow demands the source's name and Herc says "Fuzzy Dunlop."

Herc and Dozerman make a traffic stop on Marlo. Herc insists that Marlo return his camera and Marlo promises nothing, but takes Herc's card. After Marlo leaves, Dozerman urges Herc to come clean about the camera to Marimow. Herc persists in harassing Marlo, hoping that he will convince him to give the camera back. He enlists the Western DEU squad in making a raid on Marlo's courtyard hangout. Herc stops Chris and Snoop, who hide their guns in an electric hidden compartment in their vehicle's dashboard, but Herc finds their lime and nail gun in the trunk. He fires a nail into the pavement and tells them he wants his camera back.

Herc and Dozerman discuss their next move now that intimidation has failed. Herc remembers Randy's information about Little Kevin and suggests they look for him to get information on Lex's murder to get to Marlo.

=== Stanfield Organization ===
Snoop and Chris casually deposit the bodies of two New York drug dealers in a vacant building, board it up and then go out for Chinese food. Later they teach some young Stanfield soldiers tradecraft for killing on the streets.

Marlo delivers Herc's card to Proposition Joe and Slim Charles. Joe promises to look into it and thanks Marlo for the work his people are doing driving away the New York drug dealers. Slim Charles suggests that Marlo's technique of disappearing the bodies of his soldier's victims is lessening the impact of their kills. Marlo promises to discuss this issue with his associates.

Joe phones the police department and poses as a lawyer who needs to speak to Herc. Joe learns that Herc has been reassigned to the Major Crimes Unit and is patrolling the streets, then hangs up without leaving a message.

Chris and Snoop hit the streets to find more New York dealers. Chris wants Snoop to ask the dealers a question about Baltimore; if they answer incorrectly, they will get shot. Chris suggests asking a question about Baltimore music, but Snoop is not familiar with the subject. When she almost kills a local dealer by mistake, Chris takes over asking the questions. Later, they find a New York dealer, and when he doesn't understand what Chris is asking, they shoot him, leaving his body on the street.

Later, Chris and Snoop are stopped by Herc. They throw their weapons into the harbor afterwards, including the nail gun, to Snoop’s dismay.

=== Politics ===
Carcetti continues his observation of the Baltimore Police Department at work spending the day in the Eastern District with the DEU squad. The shift lieutenant introduces him to a team of confident detectives at their morning briefing. They make their first arrest by enticing a man on his way to work to buy drugs for them. Carcetti catches up with the flex squad and finds that they are also making an arrest with little more than statistical value: a young boy they have pulled up for possession. The flex squad officers try to get the boy to give them information on a stash, but he has nothing to tell them. The lieutenant seems positive about the work his men are doing.

Carcetti questions Rawls about the unimpressive low-level busts. Rawls insists that he agrees with Carcetti and indirectly blames Commissioner Ervin Burrell, claiming that affirmative action policies sometimes advance black officers beyond their capabilities, and that a leader who owes his position to the "numbers game" of affirmative action would consequently care more about numbers—such as arrest statistics—than about genuinely reducing crime. Rawls claims that targeting high-end drug dealers would be his preference, but that he respects the chain of command. Rawls admits that he would be interested in leading the department into a different investigative strategy.

After the meeting, Carcetti asks Wilson about Major Daniels, whom Carcetti views as a competent and good police officer. Wilson tells him that he does not have any political connections. Pearlman visits Daniels at his office and finds him on the phone with Carcetti. Daniels tells her that Carcetti wants to meet with him to discuss what is successful in the police department. Pearlman tells him to be himself despite his worries that the mayor will not get rid of Burrell and Rawls.

Carcetti, Wilson and Gerry meet with representatives from the Democratic party to discuss strategy for his term. They hope to induce a drop in crime and build something in the downtown area with Carcetti's name on it. The party representative suggests that education is a good polling issue, but Wilson tells her that with the problems in Baltimore's schools, Carcetti will be better off avoiding that topic. The party hopes that Carcetti will run for governor in 2008. Carcetti meets Daniels to discuss his concerns about the department. Daniels tells Carcetti that much of day-to-day police work in Baltimore is a waste of time and energy. Carcetti reveals that Rawls has blamed Burrell's numbers game. Daniels doesn't buy it, but he refuses to criticize his superiors with Carcetti. He does alert Carcetti about Rawls' gutting of the Major Crimes Unit. Carcetti offers Daniels the CID Commander position under Rawls as a colonel. Daniels asks Carcetti if he can trust him; Carcetti suggests they find out together.

When Burrell visits Rawls to discuss trying to impress the new administration together, he realises that he has already been talking to Carcetti and that Rawls is moving against him.

== Production ==
=== Title reference ===
"Corner Boys" references the terminology used to describe the disruptive students in school, and the focus taken by Colvin's group to relate to them in terms of what they know: the streets of Baltimore. The term describes the street level drug dealers, usually adolescent males, who literally stand on street corners and sell drugs.

=== Epigraph ===
We got our thing, but it's just part of the big thing.

— Zenobia

Zenobia makes this statement in Colvin's class to back up Namond, claiming that the students' drug dealing is related to the activities of larger legitimate systems.

=== Tribute ===
The police wake for Raymond Foerster is a tribute to Richard DeAngelis, the actor who played Foerster who died from prostate cancer during the shooting of Season 4.

The Pogues' "The Body of an American" is played at the wake at Kavanaugh's bar, as it had been at Ray Cole's wake from the third season.

=== Credits ===
==== Starring cast ====
Although credited Andre Royo, Seth Gilliam, Chad L. Coleman, Glynn Turman, J.D. Williams, Michael K. Williams and Corey Parker Robinson do not appear in this episode.

==== Guest stars ====
- Jermaine Crawford as Duquan "Dukie" Weems
- Maestro Harrell as Randy Wagstaff
- Julito McCullum as Namond Brice
- Tristan Wilds as Michael Lee
- Gbenga Akkinagbe as Chris Partlow
- Delaney Williams as Sergeant Jay Landsman
- Anwan Glover as Slim Charles
- Alfonso Christian Lover as Old Face Andre
- Felicia Pearson as Snoop
- Shamika Cotton as Raylene Lee
- Cyrus Farmer as Devar Manigault
- Sandi McCree as De'Londa Brice
- Thuliso Dingwall as Kenard
- Rico Sterling as Calvin
- Jason Wharton as Albert Stokes
- Stacie Davis as Miss Duquette
- Dan DeLuca as Dr. David Parenti
- Dravon James as Mrs. Grace Sampson
- Boris McGiver as Lieutenant Charles Marimow
- Davone Cooper as Darnell Tyson
- Taylor King as Zenobia Dawson
- Rakiya Orange as Charlene Young
- Devin Tweedy as Unknown
- Benjamin Busch as Officer Anthony Colicchio
- Rick Otto as Kenneth Dozerman
- Gregory L. Williams as Detective Michael Crutchfield
- Brian Anthony Wilson as Detective Vernon Holley
- Zakiya Jefferson as Unknown
- Darrell Britt-Gibson as O-Dog
- Jeffrey Wendell Moffat, Jr. as Stanfield Trainee
- Imani Robinson as Unknown
- Keenon Brice as Bug
- Gary D'Addario as Gary DiPasquale
- Kayte Dzime-Assison as Ava
- Genevieve Hudson-Price as Dee-Dee
- Denise Preddy as Miss Ella

==== Uncredited appearances ====
- Robert F. Chew as Proposition Joe Stewart
- Ed Norris as Detective Ed Norris
- Ryan Sands as Officer Lloyd "Truck" Garrick
- Karen Vicks as Gerry
- Destiny Jackson-Evans as Crystal Judkins
- Susan Rome as Assistant State's Attorney Ilene Nathan
- Michael Coley as Kwame
- Na'Dria Jennings as Chandra Porter
- Diana Villamonte as Mrs. Rachel Shapiro
- Demetria Bailey as Mrs. Perlene Scott
- Dolly Turner as Ms. Hanson
- Unknown as girl with dreadlocks
- Unknown as Markeith
- Unknown as Eastern Shift Lieutenant
- Stephen Graybill as Eastern DEU Detective #1
- Unknown as Eastern DEU Detective #2
- Unknown as Eastern Flex Squad Detective #1
- Unknown as Eastern Flex Squad Detective #2
- Unknown as Eastern Officer
- Unknown as Arrested Cyclist
- Unknown as Possession Kid
- Unknown as Lieutenant Hoskins
- Unknown as Baltimore Dealer
- BJ Butler as NY Dealer

== First appearances ==
- Devar Manigault (Bug's father): an ex-convict who is loathed by Michael.
