= React Quotes =

- The Wire episode
- Episode no.: Season 5 Episode 5
- Directed by: Agnieszka Holland
- Story by: David Simon; David Mills
- Teleplay by: David Mills
- Original air date: February 3, 2008
- Running time: 58 minutes

Episode chronology
← Previous "Transitions"	Next → "The Dickensian Aspect"

"React Quotes" is the fifth episode of the fifth season of the HBO original series The Wire. The episode was written by David Mills from a story by David Simon & David Mills and was directed by Agnieszka Holland. It first aired on February 3, 2008.

== Plot ==
Just 'cause they're in the street doesn't mean that they lack opinions.

— Haynes, in React Quotes

Marlo assumes Proposition Joe's position as The Greeks' narcotics distributor in Baltimore. Vondas gives him a phone and shows him how to communicate with the Greeks without speaking. Marlo continues to use Levy to launder money and gives Levy his new cell phone number; Herc copies the number after hours. Partlow tells his family he is going away and prepares to ambush Omar in Monk's apartment. Dukie gets beaten up by Spider when he stands up to bullying from Kenard. Michael takes Dukie to Cutty's gym to learn how to defend himself. Cutty tries to explain to Dukie that his intelligence gives him some prospects and that even if he learns how to fight, it won't necessarily stop him from being attacked. Michael also tries to teach Dukie how to shoot, but his ineptitude at target practice leads him to recommend that Dukie avoid using guns.

Bond holds a press conference to announce the corruption charges against Senator Davis. Campbell convinces Davis to take the weight of the charges himself, and Davis begins a publicity campaign claiming that the investigation against him is racially motivated. Bubbles is amazed when he is given a negative HIV test and Walon tells him to let go of his shame over Sherrod's death. Herc gives Marlo's cell phone number to Carver, who in turn gives it to Freamon. However, Daniels is unable to convince Mayor Carcetti to open a new investigation into Marlo, due to budgetary constraints. McNulty invents more details about his fake serial killer and leaks the story to Alma at the Baltimore Sun. Templeton is assigned by Gus to canvass the homeless, but he has little success and invents a quote from the "father of a homeless family".

The resulting story draws attention to the case and Daniels appeals to Carcetti for resources. The mayor only allows Greggs to assist McNulty, who, under pressure from Bunk, tells her to keep working her own cases. Freamon and McNulty decide to stage a phone call from the killer to give them probable cause for a wiretap on Marlo's cell phone number. When Templeton fakes a call to himself from the serial killer, McNulty seizes the opportunity. The story takes the front page. Freamon sets up a disconnected wiretap in Homicide that the police believe is monitoring the fake killer's cell phone, while Freamon uses the court paperwork to set up his own wiretap on Marlo's phone. Elsewhere, Elena confronts McNulty about his failing relationship with Beadie, while Beadie seeks advice from Bunk.

Omar and Donnie break into Monk's apartment where they are ambushed by Partlow, Snoop, Michael and O-Dog. Donnie is killed and Omar jumps from the fourth-floor balcony and disappears.

== Production ==
=== Guest stars ===
- Paul Ben-Victor as Spiros "Vondas" Vondopoulos
- Amy Ryan as Beatrice "Beadie" Russell
- Callie Thorne as Elena McNulty
- Chad L. Coleman as Dennis "Cutty" Wise
- Glynn Turman as Clarence Royce
- Steve Earle as Walon
- Felicia Pearson as Felicia "Snoop" Pearson
- Marlyne Afflack as Nerese Campbell
- Dion Graham as Rupert Bond
- Delaney Williams as Jay Landsman
- David Costabile as Thomas Klebanow
- Sam Freed as James Whiting
- Robert Poletick as Steven Luxenberg
- William F. Zorzi as Bill Zorzi
- Larry Andrews as Donnie
- Darrell Britt-Gibson as O-Dog
- Norris Davis as Vinson
- Kwame Patterson as Monk Metcalf
- Thomas J. McCarthy as Tim Phelps
- Scott Shane as Scott Shane
- Brian Anthony Wilson as Vernon Holley
- Brandon Young as Mike Fletcher
- Denise Boyd as AIDS clinic nurse
- Keenon Brice as Aaron "Bug" Manigault
- Thuliso Dingwall as Kenard
- Brendan Walsh as Brendan Walsh
- Larry Young as Larry Young
- Tony Cordova as Michael McNulty
- Arthur Laupus as Appointment Homeless Guy
- Eric Ryan as Sean McNulty
- Ptolemy Slocum as Business Card Homeless Man
- Tony Small as Singer
- John E. Fairley as Unknown
- Joe Hansard (Note: Played "black hair - blonde eyebrows" in Gone for Goode) as Nathan Levi Boston
- Theodore M. Snead as Sports Desk Editor
- Tony Tsendeas as Homeless Man #2
- Alexandra Tydings as Arts Desk Editor

=== Uncredited appearances ===
- Edward Green as Spider

== Trivia ==
The number Marlo gives to his lawyer in this episode—(410) 915-0909—returns a pre-recorded quote from Marlo. First reported in August 2012, the number is still active as of October 2026. At the time of broadcast the number was not in service.
