= Boys of Summer (The Wire) =

- The Wire episode
- Episode no.: Season 4 Episode 1
- Directed by: Joe Chappelle
- Story by: David Simon; Ed Burns
- Teleplay by: David Simon
- Original air date: September 10, 2006
- Running time: 58 minutes

Episode chronology
← Previous "Mission Accomplished"	Next → "Soft Eyes"

"Boys of Summer" is the first episode of the fourth season of the HBO original series The Wire. Written by David Simon from a story by David Simon & Ed Burns, and directed by Joe Chappelle, it originally aired on September 10, 2006.

== Plot ==
Snoop, Marlo Stanfield's young enforcer, replaces her cordless nail gun. Snoop and her mentor, Chris Partlow, prepare a vacant row house while a victim pleads with them. After the victim is shot with a suppressed pistol, they cover the body with quicklime and plastic sheets and nail the vacant building closed before leaving.

Councilman Tommy Carcetti and his deputy campaign manager, Norman Wilson, are busy with appointments and public appearances as Carcetti runs for mayor. The process of campaigning has left him bitter and disillusioned, and he ignores certain duties such as fundraising calls. Thomas "Herc" Hauk joins Mayor Clarence Royce's security detail. Royce's chief of staff, Coleman Parker, reports that Carcetti and Anthony Gray's campaigns are asking for two separate debates. In contrast to Carcetti, Royce has a speaking engagement with a healthy attendance at a harbor redevelopment site. Carcetti's engagement with the community initially makes him energized, but he sours upon hearing about his low poll numbers and assumes he has already lost. Later, an officer recognizes a drunk Carcetti sitting on a park bench at Federal Hill Park.

Bodie Broadus is shown running his own drug dealing crew, for which Namond Brice is the runner. One of Bodie's colleagues, Lex, complains that his baby's mother, Patrice, is dating Fruit, a crew chief from Marlo's organization. Lex threatens to kill Fruit, despite Bodie's warning that doing so will invoke Marlo's wrath. Bodie is met by Slim Charles, who now works for Proposition Joe. Meanwhile, Namond's friends Michael Lee and Randy Wagstaff ask to take them catching pigeons. Duquan "Dukie" Weems scares off the birds, which leads to Michael having to break up a fight between Dukie and Namond. That night, Lex shoots Fruit dead as he leaves a club. When Dukie is beaten up by children in the terraces, the boys plan to pelt them with water balloons filled with urine. The plan goes sour when Namond bursts a balloon on himself and his friends flee. Michael is caught and beaten. Later, Namond buys ice cream for his friends. Randy returns home and is scolded by his foster mother for breaking curfew.

Detectives Lester Freamon and Kima Greggs ask ASA Rhonda Pearlman to sign off on subpoenas of key political figures that they have linked to the Barksdale Organization. Greggs tricks Lieutenant Jimmy Asher, the Major Crimes Unit's new commander, into signing the papers they need. Freamon learns about Fruit's murder through the wiretap and meets with Bunk Moreland and Ed Norris, who are working the case in Homicide. Bunk gives Freamon a cell phone that they recovered from Fruit's body to garner more numbers for wiretaps. District Sergeant Ellis Carver harasses Bodie's crew, and encounters Jimmy McNulty, who is still a beat cop. When Bodie tries the politeness that Carver has taught him on Officer Anthony Colicchio, he is angrily rebuked. Carver reminds Colicchio that if they come down hard on everyone, they'll have no one to get information from when something serious happens.

McNulty is called to meet with Major Cedric Daniels, now commander of the Western District, who urges him to move out of the patrol division and return to detective work. After McNulty declines the offer, Daniels reflects he is probably better off in Patrol on a personal level. At the roll call meeting, officers are given a misguided mandatory lecture about soft targets for terrorism in West Baltimore. Bunk visits McNulty to ask if he knows Lex, and is invited to dinner with his domestic partner Beadie Russell. Meanwhile, Roland "Prez" Pryzbylewski arrives at an inner city school as a trainee math teacher, and is immediately hired by the principal when he mentions being a former police officer. Prez attends a seminar on student motivation that seems to be as inept as the terrorism lecture in the Western. Prez later takes in his unkempt classroom, but seems excited at the prospect of teaching.

Marlo meets with his lieutenants to discuss how to retaliate for Fruit's murder. One of them suggests killing everyone on Lex's corner, but Marlo argues that more murders would be unnecessary when nobody is trying to war with them, and the group agrees to only kill Lex. While Randy is selling candy on the corner, Little Kevin asks Randy to pass a message to Lex that Patrice wants to meet him that night. When Lex arrives at the spot, he is ambushed by Snoop and Partlow. Meanwhile, Bunk and Carver stake out the corner in search of Lex, but his absence prompts them to leave and agree to come back later. Little Kevin reveals to Randy that Lex was killed, and pays him cash for following his instructions. Snoop and Partlow board up another vacant house after leaving Lex's body there, while Randy sits outside of his home and watches a police car speed past.

== Production ==
Simon has commented that the influx of novice child actors led to an unruly behavior at the beginning of filming, but they became a closely knit group of professional young actors by the close of the series.

=== Non-fiction elements ===
During the counter-terrorism briefing, Carver jokes that terrorists "got jacked by Apex's crew." Apex was a real stick-up man in Baltimore in the 1990s whom Ed Burns met, and was one of several inspirations for Omar Little.

=== Title reference ===
The title refers to the children of West Baltimore on summer break. "The Boys of Summer" is also the title of a song by Don Henley and book by Roger Kahn, named from the poem 'I see the boys of summer' by Dylan Thomas. Both of those works illustrate a remembrance of glory days past and innocence lost. Thus the title sets the stage for the fourth season.

=== Epigraph ===
Lambs to the slaughter here.

— Marcia Donnelly

Assistant principal Donnelly makes this comment when Prez applies to be a teacher. This also can be applied to the group's (Michael, Namond, Duquan, and Randy) innocence before the events of the season begin to unfold, as well as Carcetti's inexperience heading into his campaign for election as mayor of Baltimore. The epigraph also ties into the sinister activities of Marlo's enforcers efficiently executing undesirables over pleas.

=== Music ===
The song playing in the background while Randy is selling candy to Little Kevin is "Survival of the Fittest" by Mobb Deep.

=== Credits ===
==== Starring cast ====
Although credited, Chad L. Coleman, John Doman, Frankie Faison, Andre Royo, Michael K. Williams and Robert Wisdom do not appear in this episode.

==== Guest stars ====
1. Jermaine Crawford as Duquan "Dukie" Weems
2. Maestro Harrell as Randy Wagstaff
3. Julito McCullum as Namond Brice
4. Tristan Wilds as Michael Lee
5. Gbenga Akinnagbe as Chris Partlow
6. Tootsie Duvall as Assistant Principal Marcia Donnelly
7. Henri Edmonds as School lecturer
8. Richard Hildebird as Principal Claudell Withers
9. Christopher Mann as Councilman Anthony Gray
10. Megan Anderson as Jen Carcetti
11. Brandy Burre as Theresa D'Agostino
12. Sam Coppola as "Young Tony" - Former Mayor
13. Joilet F. Harris as Officer Caroline Massey
14. Brandon Fobbs as Fruit
15. Anwan Glover as Slim Charles
16. Norman Jackson as Curtis "Lex" Anderson
17. Cleo Reginald Pizana as Chief of Staff Coleman Parker
18. Tyrell Baker as Little Kevin
19. Nathan Corbett as Donut
20. Felicia Pearson as Snoop
21. Karen Vicks as Gerry
22. Cynthia Webb-Manly as Teacher #2
23. Benjamin Busch as Officer Anthony Colicchio
24. Jay Landsman as Lieutenant Dennis Mello
25. Ed Norris as Detective Ed Norris
26. Jason Parker as Officer Reggie Leddett
27. Michael Salconi as Officer Michael Santangelo
28. Tyreeka Freamon as School Receptionist
29. Thomas C. Hessenauer as Teacher #1
30. Paul L. Nolan as Hardware store employee
31. Jim Rood as Southern District Patrol Officer
32. Gene Terinoni as Lieutenant Jimmy Asher

==== Uncredited appearances ====
- Ryan Sands as Officer Lloyd "Truck" Garrick
- Kwame Patterson as Monk Metcalf
- Thuliso Dingwall as Kenard
- Shante Usual as Patrice
- Marlyne Afflack as Nerese Campbell
- Denise Hart as Miss Anna Jeffries
- Bryan McLarney as Bryan - Western District Officer
- Tamieka Chavis as Royce's Assistant
- Chris James as Carcetti's Driver
- Mark Joy as Ed Bowers - Property Developer
- Atif Lanier as Western District Officer
- Thomas Joe Craig as Construction Foreman
- Derek A. Smith as Construction Foreman
- Unknown as Tote (Stanfield Soldier)
- Unknown as Reesy
- Unknown as Lieutenant Hoskins
- Unknown as Miss Simmons
- Unknown as Reverend Garnett

Thomas Hessenauer has a cameo in this episode as a dissenting school teacher; he is also the assistant to executive producer Nina Kostroff Noble.

== First appearances ==
- Namond Brice: Middle school child who works as a runner for Bodie Broadus. He is the son of infamous Barksdale drug enforcer Wee-Bey Brice.
- Michael Lee: Middle school child who takes a leadership role amongst his peers.
- Randy Wagstaff: Middle school child who lives with a strict foster mother and is known for his imagination and entrepreneurship. He is the son of "Cheese" Wagstaff.
- Duquan "Dukie" Weems: Impoverished middle school child whose mother is a drug addict; often bullied by his peers.
- Norman Wilson: Tommy Carcetti's new deputy campaign manager.
- Gerry: Senior Carcetti campaign staffer.
- Lieutenant Asher: Commander of the major case unit. Asher is a retiring Lieutenant who provides no interference with the cases being conducted under the lead of Lester Freamon.
- Lieutenant Hoskins: Commander of mayor Royce's security detail.
- Monk: A lieutenant in the Stanfield Organization.
- Lex, Little Kevin and Reesy: Drug dealers in Bodie's crew.
- Donut: Middle school child who is friends with Namond, Michael and Randy.
- Claudell Withers: Edward Tilghman middle school's principal who handles most of the school's external problems.
- Marcia Donnelly: Edward Tilghman middle school's assistant principal who handles most of the school's internal problems.
- Nerese Campbell: Baltimore City Council President on Mayor Clarence Royce's election ticket.

== Reception ==
=== Ratings ===
The episode drew an average of 1.5 million viewers. Coverage considered this as low compared to other HBO series like Deadwood and The Sopranos, but felt that including repeats of the episode and video-on-demand viewers would enhance the figure. Despite the low figures HBO commissioned a fifth season of the show two days after the episode aired.

=== Critical response ===
An Entertainment Weekly critic named the opening scene of the episode as the first of his "five reasons to live" for the week. A second critic picked out the parallels between the police briefing and the teachers seminar as a key element of the episode tying the institution of the school and the police department together. He also saw the scenes as significant in demonstrating how far removed the bureaucracies of modern lives are from reality.
