= Poot (The Wire) =

Character from The Wire

- The Wire character
- Tray Chaney as Poot Carr
- First appearance: "The Target" (2002)
- Last appearance: "Clarifications" (2008)
- Created by: David Simon
- Portrayed by: Tray Chaney

In-universe information
- Alias: Poot
- Gender: Male
- Occupation: Drug dealer

Malik "Poot" Carr is a fictional character in the HBO drama The Wire, played by actor Tray Chaney. Poot is a drug dealer in the Barksdale Organization who slowly rises through the ranks. He eventually leaves the drug trade after it causes the death of his best friend, and many other of his associates. He has the distinction, along with Wee-Bey Brice (Hassan Johnson), Omar Little (Michael K. Williams), Bubbles (Andre Royo), and Proposition Joe (Robert F. Chew), of being one of the only characters in the drug trade to appear in every season.

Of the 17 front-line Barksdale Organization gang members featured in the series, 12 die, and three more are imprisoned with long sentences. He survives being shot three times, more times than any other character except Omar Little. Poot distinguishes himself from the other two remaining survivors, Slim Charles (Anwan Glover) and Dennis "Cutty" Wise (Chad Coleman), as the only low-level player who completely moves away from the drug trade after the organization's collapse.

== Biography ==
=== Season 1 ===
In season 1, Poot works in the low-rise projects territory called "the pit", under D'Angelo Barksdale (Larry Gilliard Jr.). Poot is friends with fellow dealers Bodie and Wallace (Michael B. Jordan). He has a very active sex life, and at one point, the police detail investigating the Barksdale Organization listens in on him having phone sex with a girlfriend. He is depicted as being a contemporary of Bodie and Wallace's, making him about 16 when the show starts.

Poot is trapped in the stash house with other members of his crew when Omar robs it. Although he doesn't get hurt, Poot is terrified enough to vomit when Omar leaves. Poot and Wallace spot Brandon (Michael Kevin Damall), Omar's boyfriend and accomplice in the heist, and Wallace reports the sighting to D'Angelo, even though Poot doesn't believe anyone will come. Stringer Bell (Idris Elba) arrives soon afterwards with three of his Barksdale Organization enforcers.

Poot is not as affected as Wallace when Brandon's disfigured body is displayed in their neighbourhood as a warning to Omar. The trauma from seeing Brandon's body drives Wallace to stop working for the organization. Poot tries to get Wallace to return to work, but he is unsuccessful. Poot follows Wallace and realizes he has turned to drugs to escape his problems. He covers for Wallace with D'Angelo for some time but eventually tells D'Angelo the truth.

Poot's close friendship with Wallace is evident as he stays in touch with Wallace even after the police relocate him to the country. Wallace informs Poot that he has decided to move in with relatives, but in reality, he has become a police informant, leading to his relocation for protective reasons.

Stringer orders Bodie to kill Wallace after Stringer grows suspicious of Wallace's return to the projects after Wallace's long absence. During the lead-up to the hit, Poot's closer friendship with Wallace made him less confident than Bodie about the kill; however, when they cornered the fearful Wallace, who pleaded with his friends, Bodie showed much more hesitation. Only after Poot urged him to finish it did Bodie pull the trigger. Although Bodie fired the initial shot, Poot took the gun from him and finished Wallace off himself.

After the arrest of his one-time mentor and crew chief D'Angelo, Poot demonstrated his commitment to continuing his service to the Barksdale Organization. He stepped into the leadership role by assisting Bodie in physically driving away a rival drug gang. In the closing scenes of season 1, Poot is observed running the Pit, notably imparting some of the earlier lessons taught to him by D'Angelo to the current crew working for him.

=== Season 2 ===
In season 2, Poot is still running the pit. However, he has difficulty controlling his subordinates and struggles with the poor quality of product available to the crew. He is significant enough to the organization to attend Stringer's strategy meetings at a funeral home. He continues to work with Bodie who is now in control of his own tower and overseeing the pit. Bodie and Poot become embroiled in a turf dispute with an independent crew that leads to a firefight, in which Bodie, Poot and Puddin (De'Rodd Hearns) fight off six attackers. A child is killed by a stray bullet.

=== Season 3 ===
In season 3, the city's demolition of the public housing towers forces the Barksdale organization out of its prime territory - in the cold open of the season premiere, Poot expresses his sadness at the loss of the towers, revealing that he lost his virginity in one of the buildings. It is during this sequence that Bodie reveals Poot's given name is Malik Carr. While Poot remains in charge of his own crew, he now works on a street corner. Because of its move to street corners, the Barksdale organization became embroiled in a turf war with the rival Stanfield Organization.

Barksdale enforcer Slim Charles assures Poot that he will be safe to sell narcotics when the Barksdale Organization tries to expand into Stanfield territory and provides him with more muscle as protection. Poot narrowly escapes being shot in a drive-by on his corner carried out by a Stanfield soldier Snoop (Felicia Pearson), which kills a Barksdale soldier Rico (Rico Whelchel). At the close of season 3, Poot and most of the other Barksdale members are arrested, having been implicated in drug dealing by a police wiretap.

=== Season 4 ===
In the second half of season 4, Poot is released from prison after serving 15 months of a four-year prison sentence and immediately goes back to work with Bodie's crew. He is unhappy to learn that they are now working under Avon's old rival Marlo Stanfield (Jamie Hector) but does not seem to mind the change too much.

Poot is a source of advice for Bodie, who often looked to his old friend for help when trying to determine how to view Marlo's cutthroat operations. Poot is with Bodie and Spider when Marlo's crew attacks Bodie's corner. When it becomes clear that they are outnumbered, and that Bodie would rather die than flee, Poot flees the scene, while Bodie chooses to fight. Bodie is soon shot to death.

When Jimmy McNulty (Dominic West) later asks Poot who killed Bodie, Poot tells him that the police killed his friend, as Stanfield's lieutenant, Monk Metcalf, saw Bodie getting into a car with McNulty. Poot is briefly shown in the final montage of the season working for Michael Lee, who took over Bodie's corner.

=== Season 5 ===
Poot is briefly seen working at a shoe store where Dukie comes in looking for a job. Poot recognizes Dukie and admits he used to work the corners, but says that he got tired of drug dealing and decided to get a legitimate job instead, because, similar to Dennis "Cutty" Wise, dealing "got old" for Poot. He tells Dukie he will not get hired because he is not old enough and should come back after working the corners for a couple more years (Clarifications).
