= Robert F. Chew =

American actor (1960–2013)

- Born: Robert Francell Chew; December 28, 1960; Baltimore, Maryland, U.S.
- Died: January 17, 2013 (aged 52); Baltimore, Maryland, U.S.
- Occupation: Actor
- Years active: 1989–2013

Robert Francell Chew (December 28, 1960 – January 17, 2013) was an American acting coach and actor. He was best known for portraying drug kingpin Proposition Joe on the HBO drama series The Wire.

== Early life ==
Chew was born on December 28, 1960, in Baltimore. He graduated from Patterson Park High School and then studied music at Morgan State University.

== Career ==
Chew starred in the HBO drama series The Wire as drug kingpin Proposition Joe on all five seasons of the show. The role had drawn acclaim for Chew both for his ability to handle the character's verbose dialogue and the sympathy he drew while playing a "bad guy." Chew recalled that when he auditioned, the other actors were all well groomed, well dressed and thinner than he was. He later learned that the real-life inspiration for the character was a charming and debonair drug dealer so he was surprised to have received the role. He was initially unsure as to how long the character would remain in the series and so he was pleased to be one of the few characters from the drug world who appeared in all five seasons.

Chew also appeared on HBO's The Corner (created by David Simon, as was The Wire) and NBC's Homicide: Life on the Street (based on a book by Simon). He received all three roles through the Pat Moran casting agency. Simon has described Chew as a "smart, elegant actor" and stated that he has one of the most authentic Baltimore accents on the show.

Chew also worked with children's theatre companies throughout his career including Playworks USA and later the Arena Players. Through his association with the Arena Players, Moran began to turn to Chew for help in casting local young actors for the show. He provided more than twenty actors and more than six have had recurring roles including Melvin Russell (who plays Jamal) and brother and sister Rashad Orange (who plays Sherrod) and Rakiya Orange who plays Charlene Young.

Chew worked as an acting coach with several of the young actors joining the show in the fourth season and with non-professional actor Felicia "Snoop" Pearson. As acting coach Chew was responsible for preparing the core of four new young actors Tristan Wilds, Julito McCullum, Maestro Harrell and Jermaine Crawford for their major roles in the fourth season. Chew described his aim as helping the young actors find the roles within themselves and looking for what is real. Chew worked with Wilds to perfect the internalized build-up of emotion in his character, Michael Lee, and to convey the character through looks and physical acting rather than dialogue. Chew remarked that he was also impressed with Wilds' professionalism and commitment, McCullum's natural ability as Namond Brice, Harrell's charm as Randy Wagstaff and Crawford's honesty of performance as Duquan "Dukie" Weems. Chew found working with young people rewarding because it allowed him to see them develop and bring them to their full potential.

Chew also appeared in HBO films' Something the Lord Made. Chew appeared on Homicide, in the three part episode "Blood Ties", playing Wilkie Collins, a drug kingpin who hates violence.

Chew appeared in the 2014 crime drama Jamesy Boy as a drug dealer/club owner.

== Death ==
Chew died from a heart attack at his Baltimore home on January 17, 2013, at the age of 52. News of his death first spread when co-star Michael K. Williams tweeted the single sentence of “R.I.P. to the talented Mr Robert Chew #propjoe".

Upon learning of his death, another co-star of Chew's, Jamie Hector tweeted "I didn’t want to believe this #RIP Robert F Chew, Prop Joe will always be remembered Robert Chew will always be loved and missed!"

David Simon remarked to the Baltimore Sun that "Robert F. Chew was not only an exceptional actor, he was an essential part of the film and theater community in Baltimore,” and added that he “could have gone to New York or Los Angeles and commanded a lot more work, but he loved the city as his home and chose to remain here working."
