= Kenard =

Character from The Wire

- The Wire character
- Thuliso Dingwall as Kenard
- First appearance: Dead Soldiers
- Created by: David Simon
- Portrayed by: Thuliso Dingwall

In-universe information
- Gender: Male
- Occupation: Drug Dealer
- Affiliation: Marlo Stanfield Organization
- Birth: 1995 (Note: Thuliso Dingwall was born in September 1995, so this appears to be a legitimate approximation of Kenard's own birth.)

Kenard is a fictional young drug dealer on the HBO drama series The Wire, portrayed by Thuliso Dingwall. He plays a crucial role in the conclusion of the series.

== Series ==
=== Season 4 ===
Kenard is frequently seen hanging out with Namond's circle of friends, often making fun of Duquan "Dukie" Weems. Kenard works with Donut and Randy Wagstaff delivering flyers on Election Day. He also works with Namond, Donut, and Byron selling drugs, at times taking advantage of Namond's kindness. He steals the drugs, lies about the police taking them, and insults Namond. As a result, Michael Lee beats him up. In the Season 4 finale, Kenard is seen helping Michael at his new spot with Dukie. Kenard then tries to sell drugs to Roland "Prez" Pryzbylewski, who's watching Dukie from a distance.

=== Season 5 ===
Kenard pulls a prank on the cops while working on Michael's corner, and later in the season, Kenard confronts Dukie complaining Dukie is not doing his job dealing drugs as part of Michael's crew, Kenard is unaware that Michael took Dukie off the streets so he could take care of Michael's kid brother Bug. After Kenard insults him, Dukie punches Kenard, and the two get into a brief scuffle that Dukie wins. However, Spider is also present and gives Dukie a severe beating.

Kenard and company are held at gunpoint by Omar Little, who is on a mission to terrorize Marlo Stanfield's corners in an attempt to lure him into the streets. Kenard is unimpressed by the sight of Omar.

While in an alley with some friends, dousing a cat with lighter fluid and apparently planning to set it on fire, Kenard sees Omar approaching. The rest of his friends flee, but Kenard remains and then proceeds to tail Omar as Omar robs a Stanfield corner and stash house.

Kenard then follows Omar into a Korean-owned corner store and shoots him in the head, instantly killing him. Shocked, Kenard drops the gun and flees.

In the series finale, Kenard is shown during the closing montage, being led away by Detective Crutchfield, the detective in charge of investigating Omar's murder.
