= Monk Metcalf =

Character from The Wire

- The Wire character
- Kwame Patterson as Monk Metcalf
- First appearance: "Boys of Summer" (2006)
- Last appearance: "–30–" (2008)
- Created by: David Simon
- Portrayed by: Kwame Patterson

In-universe information
- Alias: Monk
- Gender: Male
- Occupation: Drug lieutenant

Monk Metcalf is a fictional character on the HBO drama series The Wire, portrayed by Kwame Patterson. Monk is a lieutenant in the Stanfield organization, and probably the third most recognized leader of the Stanfield Organization. Monk is shown throughout the series in dual roles as both an occasional enforcer but mostly as the organization's drug supply-coordinator.

In contrast to Snoop or Chris, Monk was tasked by Marlo with non-combative goals, such as handing out money to school children to enhance Marlo's street reputation, and keeping crew chiefs organized. Monk is also responsible for all phone activity in the organization and largely acts as an intermediary between Marlo and the rest of the organization.

== Biography ==
=== Season 4 ===
His non-combative role as a lieutenant hardens him and he rarely displays any understanding for anyone outside the organization or anything that impedes their status. He is first shown giving money to kids for Marlo. Monk caretakes Marlo's phone activity as shown in a scene where Old Face Andre calls and Marlo tells Monk to spy on Prop Joe and The Greeks.

Monk is responsible for making the organization aware of the camera that the Major Crimes Unit was using to spy on Marlo. When Dennis "Cutty" Wise attempts to talk to Michael Lee about his deteriorating conduct at Cutty's gym, Monk shoots Cutty in the leg for refusing to back off, only refraining from killing him at Michael's insistence. At the end of Season Four, Monk is partly responsible for the death of Preston "Bodie" Broadus as he sees him with Jimmy McNulty and reports it to Marlo, who then orders Bodie's death.

=== Season 5 ===
Monk is handed the responsibility of wholesaling drugs to the entire west side of Baltimore by Season Five, when Marlo assumes control of the New Day Co-Op following the murder of Proposition Joe. His recognized status as the top lieutenant within the organization makes him one of nine active targets listed on Omar's hitlist. He spends most of his days as bait for Omar, wearing body armour, for which he is rebuked by Snoop and Vinson. His role expands to being Marlo's second in dealings with the Co-Op, and being responsible for resupplies with The Greeks.

Monk shows some hostility when Michael Lee leaves his corner unattended for a day. He also continues occasional enforcer work when he is involved in a drive-by shooting against a rival crew with Snoop and O-Dog. Due to the wire tap investigation, Monk is arrested when pulled over and a whole re-up supply of drugs is found in the trunk of his SUV.

He is responsible for persuading Marlo that Michael may be a snitch, though this initially angers Chris. He also reveals that Omar challenged him in the street by name, causing a usually calm Marlo to be angered and shout "my name is my name" in holding. Monk and Cheese's bail chances are initially reviewed by Maurice Levy as likely as Chris has the murder warrant. However, after Levy's private deal with Rhonda Pearlman, Monk's chances of bail are out of the question, as an earlier charge in 2004 as well as the amount of narcotics found in his SUV effectively gives him a nonnegotiable sentence of up to 20 years in prison. What he was sentenced to is left unclear.
