= Dennis "Cutty" Wise =

Character from The Wire

Dennis Wise
- The Wire character
- Chad L. Coleman as Cutty Wise
- First appearance: "Time After Time" (2004)
- Last appearance: "React Quotes" (2008)
- Created by: David Simon and George Pelecanos
- Portrayed by: Chad L. Coleman

In-universe information
- Alias: Cutty
- Gender: Male
- Occupation: Day laborer and boxing trainer

Dennis "Cutty" Wise is a fictional character inspired by real-life boxing trainer Calvin Ford on the HBO drama The Wire, played by actor Chad Coleman. Wise is a reformed criminal who sets up a boxing gym for neighborhood children. The name "Dennis Wise" was taken from an actual Baltimore contract killer was given a life sentence in prison, then was released in 2017 and has become an anti-violence advocate himself. The nickname "Cutty" originates from the character serving time in the Maryland State Penitentiary in Jessup, Maryland, which was nicknamed "The Cut".

== Biography ==
=== Season three ===
Cutty is known as a legendary soldier in Baltimore's drug trade and was finishing a fourteen-year prison sentence when Avon Barksdale and Wee-Bey Brice arrived in prison. Cutty is well respected by Avon and many others in his organization for the work he did before going to prison, including phoning the police from the scene of a daytime murder he had committed. Avon approaches Cutty with an offer of work shortly before his release.

Barksdale lieutenant Shamrock gives him a homecoming gift of a package of narcotics. After observing a street dealer for a time, Cutty approaches him and offers to supply him for a cut of the profit. The dealer, Fruit, takes Cutty up on his offer but refuses to pay him when Cutty returns for the profits. Fruit then takes out a gun and threatens Cutty, leading him to back down.

Cutty turns to work as a day laborer with a landscaping crew to get by. He tracks down his ex-girlfriend, Grace Sampson, to reconnect and finds her working as a schoolteacher. She puts him in touch with her church deacon to help him find work, but resists any other involvement. The deacon suggests that Cutty study to obtain his GED, but Cutty sees this as too difficult and, despite his initial hesitation, begins working with the Barksdale crew soon after his parole.

His effectiveness and intelligence as an enforcer is shown on several occasions when working for Avon. He quickly earns the respect of Avon's primary enforcer Slim Charles, who throws a welcome home party for Cutty. He works with young soldiers Sapper and Gerard to track down a thief in the Barksdale organization, and his experience and intelligence enables them to quickly identify the culprit. Cutty is appalled when the younger soldiers almost kill the young dealer, believing a warning beating sufficient to modify his behavior but keep him fit to work for them.

A turf war between the Barksdales and new power Marlo Stanfield provides more work for Barksdale soldiers. Cutty and Slim Charles plan a raid on a Stanfield corner using a pincer movement. Their younger associates ruin their plan by striking too soon and Barksdale veteran Country is killed as a consequence. Cutty and Slim Charles later decide to strike back alone but when their moment comes Cutty is faced with Fruit and finds himself unable to fire. It becomes clear to Cutty that he no longer has "the game" in him, after which he tells Avon that he's leaving the crew, saying, "The game ain’t in me no mo'." Avon decides to let him leave, telling Slim Charles that Cutty still deserves their respect.

Wise then begins to build a new life by returning to landscaping and, at the deacon's suggestion, opens a boxing gym. At first he is overwhelmed by the bureaucracy and red tape involved in opening the gym, but receives political backing from the deacon's contact, Rev. Frank Reid. Reid puts Wise in touch with State Delegate Odell Watkins and Marla Daniels. Watkins has Daniels help Wise to get the permits he needs for the gym. Attempting to raise the funds to properly equip the gym, he approaches Avon to request the funding. Avon, a former amateur boxer, happily provides the money without any incentive, to Cutty's surprise.

Wise connects with sergeant Ellis Carver through his efforts to encourage children away from drug dealing through sports, and the two develop a mutual respect. He has some success with local children, particularly when the Barksdale-Stanfield turf war temporarily closes down much of the drug trade in the area. In particular, one young dealer named Justin has talent and works hard to improve as a boxer. However, the turf war comes to a sudden end when Avon is arrested, and Cutty finds his gym quickly deserted as the children return to work. Cutty continues his efforts at personal reform despite this setback. In the finale he chastises his students for eating junk food, Fruit who shows up is deterred from intervening. Sensing the tension, Justin asks what time to show up Cutty replies "3.30 be good" before leaving staring at Fruit, who is trembling in fear of him as he leaves.

=== Season four ===
In season four Wise's gym is thriving and he has taken on a number of other trainers to work with the kids. Justin returns to training and begins to compete in local boxing matches. Wise receives a great deal of attention from the women of the neighborhood, including the mothers of some of his trainees, who are, it is suggested, jumping at the opportunity to meet a decent and paternal man in a community in which many men have been absent, corrupted, killed, or incarcerated.

He has become adept at controlling the boys who use the gym and earning their respect, although he jeopardizes his position with some of them as a result of his womanizing. He is also having some success in his work as a landscaper having acquired a working knowledge of the Spanish spoken by most of his colleagues. The crew chief is so impressed with Wise that he offers to make him a partner in the business and put him in charge of a second crew, but Wise declines so that he can focus on the gym.

Wise begins to take an interest in training a boy named Michael Lee who he believes is a natural boxer. Michael, distrustful of older men due to his history of being abused by his stepfather, rebuffs Wise's first offer of coaching. Wise unintentionally alienates Michael after he beat up Namond for taunting Duquan, pushing Michael closer to former rival gang the Barksdale, joining Spider who works on Bodie's corner after Wise slept with his mother. Later on, Wise is shot in the leg while trying to convince Michael to leave the corner life. While in the hospital, Wise is instrumental in getting Namond Brice off the streets by arranging Howard Colvin to have a "sitdown" with Namond's father, Wee-Bey. He also begins dating the nurse he met at the Hospital, who initially berated him for his past gangster behaviour, until Colvin clears up that Cutty is not a gang member anymore and that he is deterring people from the streets.

=== Season five ===
In season five, Wise is briefly shown when Michael Lee, looking out for his friend Duquan "Dukie" Weems, drops him off to train with Cutty. Cutty watches Dukie fight and, seeing his ineptitude as a boxer, tells him that he has other talents and tries to inspire him to leave Baltimore, though he ultimately admits that he himself, despite having reformed, doesn't know how to get out.

== Origins ==
George Pelecanos is given credit with creating the character of Dennis Wise, based on unused notes from his novel Drama City about a man getting out of prison after almost two decades. The idea reflected the "reform" theme of the third season, so the character was added. David Simon's books Homicide: A Year on the Killing Streets and The Corner (written with Ed Burns) both mention the real Dennis Wise. He is described as one of the two most infamous contract killers active in Baltimore during the late 1970s - Vernon Collins being the other.

Police were frustrated by the fact that no witnesses could be found against either man. Neither Wise nor Collins would break under intense police questioning, refusing to say anything other than to request a lawyer. Dennis Wise was eventually sentenced to life in prison in 1979 for a contract killing. In 1999, Maryland Correctional officials transferred Wise to an Arizona prison in Yuma because he was allegedly leading an influential prison gang. Wise wrote a novel called The Wolf Trap while in prison, then became an advocate for fighting violence after being released in 2017.
