= Clarence Royce =

Character from The Wire

Clarence V. Royce
- The Wire character
- Glynn Turman as Clarence Royce
- First appearance: "Time After Time" (2004)
- Last appearance: "React Quotes" (2008)
- Created by: David Simon
- Portrayed by: Glynn Turman

In-universe information
- Occupation: Mayor of Baltimore; Politician

Clarence V. Royce is a fictional character in the HBO series The Wire played by Glynn Turman.

== Season 3 ==
Clarence V. Royce is the Mayor of Baltimore whose first appearance is at the demolition of the Franklin Terrace housing projects as a means of demonstrating reform throughout Baltimore. The election is approaching and Parker notices the increasing influence of Councilman Tommy Carcetti and deduces that he may be planning to run for mayor. Royce initially scoffs at the possibility of Carcetti becoming Mayor, believing it is not possible for a white candidate to be elected in a predominantly black city. Royce senses that Carcetti will use the rising crime rate to attack his record.

Royce calls on Burrell to reduce the felony rate citywide, and orders the BPD to reduce felonies by a minimum of 5% in each district and keep the murder rate below 275 for the year in order to counter Carcetti's campaign. When crime rates begin to rise, Parker and Watkins urge Royce to fire Burrell as police commissioner. Royce finds himself caught between Burrell and the decent State's Attorney Steven Demper, both of whom have been loyal to the mayor. When Watkins helps Marla Daniels take the seat of Royce loyalist Eunetta Perkins on the City Council, Royce holds up her husband's promotion and supports Perkins.

Royce's propensity to put his career ahead of the needs of the city creates political enemies. Carcetti seizes on Royce's unwillingness to divert funds into a witness protection scheme, drawing the support of Watkins and other black politicians. A black politician, Tony Gray, runs against Royce on the platform of education reform. Gray suggests that Carcetti run as his vice-mayor. Carcetti launches his own campaign hoping Gray's campaign will split the city's black vote.

When Royce's office gets wind of the existence of drug-tolerant zones set up in West Baltimore by BPD Major Howard "Bunny" Colvin, collectively known as "Hamsterdam", Parker again advises the mayor to fire Burrell. However, seeing the drop in crime citywide, Royce is initially open-minded about Hamsterdam. Parker and Watkins realize that such a decision would be disastrous for Royce, earning the loss of the black community's support and the ridicule of the government. Despite their concerns, Demper and several public health officials support keeping Hamsterdam open.

Burrell comes to believe that Royce is using Hamsterdam to make a power play against the BPD, and leaks information about the zones to Carcetti and the press. In the wake of the public outcry against Hamsterdam, Royce regrets his prior support. Burrell then threatens to go public with Royce's lack of action over Hamsterdam, demanding a full term as BPD Commissioner. Needing Burrell's clout to deal with the City Council, Royce caves to Burrell's blackmail against Watkins' wishes. However, Royce and Parker secretly agree to fire Burrell once they win re-election.

== Season 4 ==
Royce's re-election campaign is a well-oiled machine. Parker is an effective fundraiser and Royce is booked into many high-profile speaking opportunities with property developers to push his motto of reform and development. Royce receives massive contributions and fundraising help from developer Andy Krawczyk. He retains State Senator Clay Davis as his deputy campaign chairman. Royce is given more reason to be displeased with Burrell when these key political figures's records are subpoenaed by the BPD's Major Case Unit.

An outraged Davis tells Royce that he never asks where his money comes from, implying that its origin is illicit, and warns that he should be protected if Royce wants continued funding for the campaign. Royce displays this anger to Burrell, who assures that there will be no more surprises within his department.

Royce has an adulterous relationship with one of his secretaries, and at one point, his new driver Herc catches the secretary giving Royce oral sex. He later checks with Parker to see who Herc's friends are in the BPD and considers having him reassigned. Royce then talks with Herc, asking his career goals in the department and why he chose to work on the mayoral security detail. When Herc claims he did it to move up on the sergeants list, Royce immediately calls Burrell to have him promoted as a reward for his silence.

Royce's campaign receives its first major setback in the debates. Carcetti drops a bombshell on Royce when he uses news of a recently killed state's witness in an answer, taking the opportunity to accuse Royce of ignoring his request for witness protection in Baltimore. Royce is unaware of the killing and unable to respond adequately. Royce's campaign then goes downhill as Carcetti grasps a sizeable number of black voters.

Royce gets more angered when Burrell fails to successfully downplay the witness investigation and promises to fire him at Parker's request following an election victory. Furthermore, Royce's relationship with Watkins becomes frayed over his support for both Daniels and Perkins, his appeasement of the developers, and his illegal campaign contributions. Watkins also believes that Royce disregards the black community, cynically using Marcus Garvey-inspired campaign posters to win their vote.

The mayor's security detail leaks the news of Royce and Watkins' falling out to Deputy Commissioner William Rawls, who believes that Carcetti can do better things for the BPD. After Watkins lends his support to Carcetti, Royce loses the election. He appears to have taken his loss in stride, though; following his defeat, he and Carcetti reconcile amicably.

It is mentioned by Parker that after leaving the Mayor's office, Royce is considering mounting a primary challenge to Congressman Elijah Cummings, but it is not clear if he actually launches a campaign.

== Season 5 ==
Royce speaks at a rally in support of Davis, who is facing a grand jury investigation.

== Relationships ==
Through Royce's depiction on the show, his relationships with various subordinates and groups is shown in a differing manner. Mayor Royce is shown having a good relationship with Property Developers, a bad relationship with Commissioner Burrell and Councilmen Carcetti and Gray, and a circumstantial relationship with other various characters whom he interacts with on the show.

=== Property developers ===
Mayor Royce cares greatly about those who fund his campaign as he seeks re-election through development and reform of a decayed city. Royce is quick to protect developers such as Andy Krawczyk who own development agencies and contribute heavily to his office. In turn, Royce overrides their permits to be approved by power of the Mayor's office regardless of opposition to developing in a specific area. The Grainery in Season 2 which IBS members were fighting to keep is an example.

Every month, Royce held a poker game where the developers' losses, most of which occurred by purposeful folds, would go into Mayor Royce's pockets to buy influence throughout Baltimore City's residents and politicians. Royce also is seen showing support for Senator Clay Davis, a corrupt politician who receives illegal money that contributes heavily to the support of the city administration offices. As Royce's campaign is dependent on developer money, he is stated to be "in bed with every developer" having their security as a paramount concern of his.

=== Police and State's Attorney's office ===
As Mayor Royce's office is viewed as being soft on crime by the public safety subcommittee, Royce is extremely critical of the Baltimore Police Department often blaming Commissioner Ervin Burrell solely for the department's problems. Other politicians such as Odell Watkins view Burrell as merely the "hack" of the ministers and often pass down the negative criticism of the department to the mayor's office. To improve his office's view on crime, Royce pressures Burrell to reduce it by any means necessary as a means of being re-elected.

The pressure causes Burrell to relieve two of his majors Marvin Taylor and Howard Colvin, two black district commanders whose districts' uncontrollable drug trade made them unable to reduce crime by conventional methods instructed to them by the department's upper command. Burrell was quick to criticize his own subordinates in order to protect Royce from the City Council. Because of this, Royce initially values Burrell's loyalty but is later angered by the department for issuing subpoenas against election fundraisers and making the public aware of the murder of a dead state's witness. Royce looks from there to fire Burrell upon re-election and promote William Rawls to the BPD Commissioner.

Royce is also criticized for keeping Steven Demper, the Maryland State's Attorney for Baltimore City on his campaign ticket as Demper is more interested in his elected position then pursuing justice. Demper, like Burrell is valued for his loyalty and keeps his post under Royce's rule. Following the election, Royce and Demper both lose however and a new front office consisting of former Councilman Thomas Carcetti and State's Attorney Rupert Bond take their places respectively.

=== Relationship with city council and politicians ===
Royce generally relies on Chief of Staff Coleman Parker and Delegate Watkins to help him remain eye to eye with city council members. Royce appreciates loyalty from city politicians keeping them on his campaign ticket even when their position is questionably granted. He is shown being hammered by Baltimore City Council members Tony Gray and Thomas Carcetti for the decay of the city due to the rise in crime and decline in quality of public education.

To appease the two of them, especially Carcetti whom he views as a threat to his chair, Royce criticizes Ervin Burrell and other public figures pressuring them to meet the council's demands if for any other reason to guarantee re-election. It is noted early in Season 3 that Royce receives no support from the first district represented by Carcetti as it is a predominantly white ethnic area in Southeastern Baltimore which has a history for voting against black politicians. When Royce is questioned about witness protection from Carcetti, Odell Watkins assists Carcetti in obtaining the matching funds, but Royce ignores the council's pleas which eventually result in becoming a problem in his campaign.

Royce also finds conflict with Watkins in the city's eleventh district for keeping incumbent councilwoman Eunetta Perkins on his ticket. Royce eventually lies to Watkins promising to drop her for Watkins' protégé Marla Daniels, but keeps Perkins on the ticket anyway. This causes a split from Delegate Watkins who is the kingmaker essential in keeping Royce in line with the council members.

Coleman Parker remains loyal to Royce up until the election where following the loss, he plans to help a new candidate from Maryland's Eastern Shore with Carcetti's Chief of Staff Norman Wilson. Royce also relies heavily on West Baltimore State Senator Clay Davis who when properly positioned is an instrumental player in gaining the necessary votes from specifically needed people. Davis' loyalty however is circumstant to bribery and those who protect him from criminal investigations.

=== Relationship with voters ===
Following Royce's introduction in Season 3, city voters are angered by the rise in crime and other negative attributes from Royce's office. Royce appeases the voters through criticizing and threatening to demote his subordinates such as Burrell to make the city look better. Royce is actually more concerned about creating a good image amongst city voters temporarily as a means of winning the election and is not as concerned about having his office create good permanent changes that occur based on the voter's actual needs.

To win against Tommy Carcetti and Tony Gray, Royce plays the race card in the election in Season 4 relying on Baltimore's black majority to vote for him. Royce's office figures that with their funding, Carcetti's race, black flag campaign colors, and Marcus Garvey posters that Royce appears as the best candidate amongst black voters. Odell Watkins however sees through Royce's scheme pointing out that his interest in the voters' safety is not as high as his interest in the property developers' security causing him to move his support to Tommy Carcetti which becomes the turning point during re-election.

=== Relationship with family ===
Royce is shown to be married in Season 4 but is caught in an adulterous affair with a female secretary by Officer Thomas "Herc" Hauk. After establishing Herc's loyalty, Royce grants him a promotion and keeps his affair secret. Royce's wife appears accompanying him to church on the Sunday before the election.
