= Norman Wilson (The Wire) =

Character from The Wire

- The Wire character
- Reg E. Cathey as Norman Wilson
- First appearance: "Boys of Summer" (2006)
- Last appearance: "–30–" (2008)
- Created by: David Simon
- Portrayed by: Reg E. Cathey

In-universe information
- Gender: Male
- Occupation: Carcetti Administrative Aide

Norman Wilson is a fictional character on the HBO drama The Wire, played by Reg E. Cathey. Wilson is a professional political operative and works closely with ambitious politician Tommy Carcetti. The character first appeared in the show's fourth season premiere "Boys of Summer" and Cathey is part of the starring cast for the fourth and fifth seasons.

== Biography ==
Wilson is a professional political operative. He was previously a night editor at The Baltimore Sun and was much loved by his reporters. He has a professional, savvy and honest presence. He grew up in Catonsville, a southwestern Baltimore County suburb of Baltimore.

=== Season four ===
Wilson serves as Councilman Tommy Carcetti's deputy campaign manager in his run for Mayor of Baltimore, under campaign manager Theresa D'Agostino. He is an honest voice in Carcetti's campaign and is often the sounding board for Carcetti's worries about race in Baltimore politics. When the poll results do not go in Carcetti's favor, Carcetti assumes he will lose and becomes uninterested in the campaign. Wilson is left to keep his candidate on track despite his pessimism.

After Carcetti wins the Democratic primary and subsequent election, Wilson continues to serve as Carcetti's right-hand man, accompanying the newly elected Mayor everywhere he goes. Wilson becomes disillusioned with Carcetti when he puts his own ambition above the needs of the city. He talks with Clarence Royce's former advisor, Coleman Parker, and muses about managing the campaign of another up-and-coming politician on the Eastern Shore of Maryland.

=== Season five ===
Despite his misgivings, Wilson remains on Carcetti's staff as the Mayor struggles with a budget crisis while planning his run for governor. Carcetti is aware of Wilson's feelings about his decision but still seeks his counsel. When BPD Commissioner Ervin Burrell delivers altered crime rate statistics, Carcetti seizes his chance to fire him and hopes to eventually replace him with Cedric Daniels; Carcetti instructs Wilson to leak the story to test the waters. Wilson contacts Gus Haynes, a friend from The Sun, and gives him the details along with a photograph of Daniels.

When the truth of Jimmy McNulty's "homeless killer" is revealed, Wilson expresses a forlorn wish that he was still a journalist at The Sun "so I could write on this mess. It's too fucking good." He is present when Carcetti wins the gubernatorial election and becomes governor of Maryland.
