= Tootsie Duvall =

American actress

- Occupation: Actress
- Years active: Since 1978

Tootsie Duvall is an American film and television actress.

== Career ==
In recent years, she is known for her role as Assistant Principal Marcia Donnelly in the television series The Wire.

=== Selected filmography ===
- Second Thoughts (1983)
- Tin Men (1987)
- Major League II (1994)
- Serial Mom (1994)
- Pecker (1998)
- Species II (1998)
- Liberty Heights (1999)
- A Dirty Shame (2004)
- Syriana (2005)
- Rocket Science (2007)

=== Selected television work ===
- The Initiation of Sarah (1978) (television film)
- Starsky and Hutch (1978; 1 episode)
- Zuma Beach (1978) (television film)
- Starting Fresh (1979) (television series pilot)
- Angie (1979–1980; 3 episodes)
- The Greatest American Hero (1982; 1 episode)
- Thou Shalt Not Kill (1982) (television film)
- The Corner (2000; 3 episodes) (television miniseries)
- The Wire (2006–2008; 12 episodes)
