= Randy Wagstaff =

Character from The Wire

- The Wire character
- Maestro Harrell as Randy Wagstaff
- First appearance: "Boys of Summer" (episode 4.01)
- Last appearance: "The Dickensian Aspect" (episode 5.06)
- Created by: David Simon
- Portrayed by: Maestro Harrell

In-universe information
- Occupation: Student

Randy Wagstaff is a fictional character on the HBO drama The Wire, played by Maestro Harrell. Randy is an enterprising student who is dependent on social services. During season 4, he was an 8th grade pupil at Edward Tilghman Middle School and is friends with Namond Brice, Michael Lee and Duquan "Dukie" Weems. He lived with a foster mother, Miss Anna, who instilled some discipline in his life.

He is well known amongst his peers for his imagination and ideas. Randy runs a small business selling snacks and drinks to his peers and neighborhood drug dealers. He shares his last name with drug lieutenant Cheese Wagstaff. Though the relationship was never established on the show, creator David Simon revealed Cheese to be Randy's biological father—which would also make Proposition Joe Randy's granduncle.

== Character storyline ==
=== Season four ===
In a dispute with a rival gang of children, Randy came up with the idea of filling water balloons with urine and ambushing the other gang. The plan backfired when Namond accidentally burst a balloon on himself, but Randy escaped unscathed. He also attempts to make money by catching homing pigeons to sell to drug kingpin Marlo Stanfield for his pigeon coop.

Randy was naively involved in the murder of local drug dealer, Lex. When Stanfield dealer, Fruit, is killed by Lex - Chris advises restraint, suggesting they kill the perpetrator instead of all the members of the independent drug crew. Marlo agrees with Chris' approach and gives him the go-ahead to kill Lex. Little Kevin tells Lex that Patrice, (the mother of his child), wants to meet him at eight in a secluded spot; an action Little Kevin then pays Randy to do. Once the trap is sprung, Lex is murdered by Chris and Snoop. Little Kevin tells Randy he did well and gives him more money, to Randy's distress.

Randy receives money from Stanfield drug dealer Monk Metcalf as part of an effort by Marlo Stanfield to ingratiate himself to neighborhood kids. Randy loses the money to Western district officer Eddie Walker when he is chased away from a car stolen by his friend Donut. Walker refuses to believe Randy's story that the money is from his foster mother and pockets it, telling Randy his mother can come to the district headquarters to reclaim it.

When the school year begins, Randy ingratiates himself to his home room teacher Roland "Prez" Pryzbylewski with a hand shake and assists in controlling the class. When Prez is distracted, Randy asks permission for a hall pass and then takes several passes from Prez's desk. He uses the hall passes to get around the school selling candy and snacks to the other students. To reach the other grades Randy wears layers of clothing so that he can don the appropriate color uniform depending on to which grade he sells candy. Randy's scheme gets him into trouble when he is caught in the sixth grade cafeteria by Miss Reese, who recognizes him from her class two years ago. He is sent to Assistant Principal Marcia Donnelly's office. She threatens to tell his foster mother about his actions unless he gives her information about who has been graffitiing school property. Randy complies with her demands and continues to cut class to sell snacks. He is paid by another student to act as a lookout while he and another boy have sex with a fellow middle school girl, Tiffani, in a bathroom. Randy is reluctant to get involved but is pressured into agreeing.

Lex's murder continues to trouble Randy. He discusses Chris Partlow's activities with his friends who tell him an urban legend that Chris is a zombie master who has turned all the missing people like Lex into zombies to do his bidding. Randy believes his friends and begins to fear that Chris will come after him. When Chris visits Michael on another issue, Randy assumes he has come to ask about him. His friends tease him for thinking Chris turns people into zombies, so Randy talks to Dukie about his worries.

Dukie tells him that Chris is just a murderer. He shows Randy a dead body Chris has hidden in a vacant building to convince him. Despite his promise to Dukie not to share the secret, Randy offers his knowledge of the murder to Mrs. Donnelly after she discovers his role in the bathroom incident. She threatens him with expulsion and exposure of his misdeeds to his foster mother, which will lead to him being sent to a group home—Randy's greatest fear.

Randy is suspended from school for acting as a lookout in the bathroom incident when Tiffani claims she was raped. Donnelly gets the police involved because Randy also confesses that he knows about Lex's murder. Prez intervenes and approaches Cedric Daniels to protect Randy from the system. Daniels puts Randy in the care of Sergeant Ellis Carver. Carver interviews Randy to find out what he knows and then returns him to his foster mother, reassuring her that Randy is not a bad kid.

Suspended, Randy then accompanies Miss Anna to the polling station on election day. While waiting for her, he picks up a day's work delivering campaign material. He recruits Dukie, Donut, and Kenard to help him. Donut steals a car so that they can travel around more easily despite Randy's hesitation. Randy loses his workers when they learn that he was paid up front. They decide to take their share of the money without completing the job, forcing Randy to carry on alone.

Carver turns Randy over to his old partner, Thomas "Herc" Hauk, because Herc is desperate for information about the Stanfield organization, and he tells Herc to take Randy to see Bunk afterwards. Herc misjudges Randy and believes he is lying about not actually seeing Lex's murder. He pressures Randy to admit that he was there, to no avail. Herc believes that Randy is useless and lets him go home, forgetting to take him to Bunk. Later, while interviewing Little Kevin, Herc mentions that he learned about Lex's murder from Randy, implying Randy provided details on the perpetrator.

Tiffani eventually drops the rape allegation and Randy's suspension is lifted. He returns to school to find his math class transformed—Prez is teaching the class probability through dice and card games and a new computer has been set up. Michael is suspicious of his time away from school and subtly warns Randy against getting involved as an informant for either the police or the teachers.

From Little Kevin, it soon leaks out that Randy had been questioned by police and based on Herc's comment they believe Randy revealed information, which makes its way to Marlo. Although the penalty for informing to police is usually death, Marlo declines to order a hit on the grounds that Randy poses no further threat to him. Instead, he instructs Chris and Snoop to spread the word that Randy has been speaking to the police and he is labeled as a snitch in the streets.

Randy is walking with Michael and Duquan when he is confronted at school by a group of students who want to fight him for being a snitch. Although Michael protects Randy and fights the kids off, Randy is beaten badly. Word soon gets back to Carver that Randy is in trouble around school and in his neighborhood. Carver is very upset because he feels he is partly to blame and he puts a police car on lookout at Randy's house, promising Randy that he's going to take care of everything.

People looking to hurt Randy notice the car and make a false police call from a nearby telephone booth to get them to leave the scene. With the cops gone, molotov cocktails are thrown into the house, burning it down and leaving Miss Anna with second and third degree burns, and leaving Randy without a home or guardian.

Carver tries his hardest to help Randy find another foster parent but to no avail. He asks if he can become Randy's foster parent but is told that the vetting process would take months and, in the end, might not be successful. Randy ends up going back to a group home, where he still hasn't escaped his "snitch" title. He ends up getting into fights with the other older, more hostile kids in the home.

=== Season five ===
A year later, Bunk revisits the Lex murder and attempts to question Randy. Randy (noticeably taller and more muscular), having lost his childlike innocence, is unresponsive to Bunk and storms off pushing another kid in the group home down for being in his way.

== Critical response ==
Entertainment Weekly named the character one of the five most interesting characters in season four.
