= Dukie Weems =

Character from The Wire

Duquan Weems
- The Wire character
- Jermaine Crawford as Duquan Weems
- First appearance: "Boys of Summer" (2006)
- Last appearance: "–30–" (2008)
- Created by: David Simon
- Portrayed by: Jermaine Crawford

In-universe information
- Alias: Dukie
- Gender: Male
- Occupation: Student

Duquan "Dukie" Weems is a fictional character on the HBO drama The Wire, played by Jermaine Crawford. Dukie is a student at Edward Tilghman Middle School. He has a difficult home life because the adults in his home are either alcoholics or drug addicts. He is a recurring target for teasing and bullying because of his lack of personal hygiene, his offensive body odor, and his dirty clothes.

There is no running water in his house, and his parents sell any clean clothes donated to him. He has to depend upon his three friends – Namond Brice, Michael Lee, and Randy Wagstaff – for emotional and sometimes financial support. Namond has a tendency to bully him, but Michael remains consistently loyal to Dukie.

His original nickname, "Dukie", is a homophone for a slang term for feces. After Mr. Prez voluntarily lets him use the school showers and washes his clothing, his peers begin to call him "Duke" instead.

== Series ==
=== Season 4 ===
Dukie faces bullying and beatings from a rival gang of boys, from whom his friends fiercely protect him. Following Dukie's receiving a beating, his friends plan a retaliation. Dukie takes part, but the plan backfires, and some of his friends are caught and beaten. Namond rewards Dukie's efforts with an ice cream at Michael's urging.

The assistant principal at Dukie's middle school, Marcia Donnelly, provides him with second-hand school supplies. She has one of his peers, Crystal, deliver them to him at home but is careful to instruct her to give it directly to Dukie, to ensure they reach him and not his drug-addicted parents who are inclined to sell his possessions.

When the school year begins, Dukie walks to school with his eighth grade classmates Randy, Michael, and Namond. Rather than having them call for him, he waits for them and then joins them. Randy gives Dukie his packed lunches to eat.

Snooty De'Londa Brice refuses to let Dukie into her home when the boys visit Namond. Outside the school Dukie finds a discarded electric fan, and he spends his free time on the first day of school repairing it. He is teased by his classmates for his lack of personal hygiene.

In particular, a girl named Chiquan refuses to sit next to him in Mr. Pryzbylewski's math class. Chiquan is attacked with a boxcutter by a female classmate whom she had bullied earlier in the season. The girl injures Chiquan and is then disarmed by Mrs. Sampson. Dukie approaches the girl who had the boxcutter as she sits on the floor fuming. He turns on the fan and allows it to blow gently on her face before giving it to her.

Dukie helps to convince Randy that Stanfield soldier Chris Partlow is a murderer rather than a supernatural force. He tells Randy he witnessed Chris kill someone in a vacant building but asks him to keep it a secret. He then shows Randy and Michael a body interred in a vacant house as proof.

Prez tries to help Dukie by giving him food at lunchtime and providing him with new clothes. The clothes are soon taken by Dukie's family to be sold for drugs and booze. Prez later gives Dukie another set of clothes, which are to be kept in a gym locker at school. He offers to let Dukie inside the gym early to wash up in the morning and to take his clothes home to launder them in the evening.

Dukie becomes close to Prez and helps him to take dice from board games, which Mr. Prez uses to teach probability, and to unearth a computer from storage at the school, which Dukie later uses for a special class project. Dukie begins to enjoy the class and becomes one of the more competent students, as well as learning a variety of skills on the computer.

Before the end of the school year, Duquan's improved performance gets him promoted to the ninth grade (a high school grade), much to his dismay. He is promoted, according to Ms. Donnelly, to "be with his peers." Although it is clear Duquan is not socially ready to enter the ninth grade, the school looks at it as a way to "juke stats" which makes it look like their students are showing better progress and advancement in their skills than they really are.

Duquan bids farewell to Prez, who tells Duquan to visit him at school whenever he can. Duquan goes to his house one day after school with Michael, and sees an eviction notice on the door and all of his belongings on the street. With Duquan's family being evicted and his having no place to live, Michael invites Duquan to stay at his new residence, which was provided by Marlo. Duquan accepts. Michael further shows his loyalty as a friend to Dukie by beating down Namond after Namond makes fun of Dukie for a last time in Cutty's gymnasium.

In the season finale, Duquan makes an attempt at going to his new school but, without the presence and support of his friends, and the onset of being bumped into by bullies, he cannot bring himself to go to class. Later, he pays a visit to Prez at school without his backpack, wearing brand-new clothes, and bearing a gift for Prez. Prez follows Duquan and observes he has dropped out of school and is with Michael on the corner, selling drugs.

=== Season 5 ===
Duquan fails to win the respect of Spider and Kenard. Noticing this behavior, Michael takes Dukie off the corner and pays him to look after Bug. Dukie is worried about the emasculating effect of the decision and concerned over how he will spend his time, but accepts Michael's recommendation.

Duquan, Michael, and Bug take a day trip to Six Flags. They enjoy their day, but when they return Monk confronts Michael about leaving his corner unattended. After being questioned about his loyalty to the organization, taunted by Kenard and beaten up by Spider, Dukie approaches Dennis "Cutty" Wise to learn how to fight and tries to get Michael to teach him to shoot.

Dukie tries to find work at a shoe store but the salesman, Poot Carr, tells him that he cannot apply until he is 17. When Michael goes into hiding after killing Felicia "Snoop" Pearson, Michael has a car for the night and he, Dukie, and Bug pack up and drive to his aunt's house in Howard County. Michael walks Bug to the door with a shoebox full of cash.

Back in Baltimore, Michael tells Dukie that it would be too dangerous for them to stay together. At Dukie's' request, Michael drives him to the squalid area where the junk man lives among homeless people and junkies. Dukie tries to make light of the situation, but Michael is too depressed, and they part. Dukie hesitates when he sees the junk man injecting heroin and turns back to Michael, but he has already left.

Duquan goes to his former teacher, Mr. Pryzbylewski, to ask for a loan in order to get back in school and earn his GED. Prez is immediately suspicious of this but gives Duquan the money anyway. When Pryzbylewski drops him off after giving Dukie the money, he sees, as he expected, he has been hustled by Duquan, who returns to the junk man with the money in hand. Disappointed, Pryzbylewski drives away as Duquan and the junk man go off to buy drugs.

In the ending montage, Dukie is shown shooting heroin with the junk man. His actions parallel those of Bubbles.
