= Snoop (The Wire) =

Character from The Wire

Felicia Pearson
- The Wire character
- Felicia Pearson as Snoop
- First appearance: "Homecoming" (2004)
- Last appearance: "Late Editions" (2008)
- Created by: David Simon
- Portrayed by: Felicia Pearson

In-universe information
- Alias: Snoop
- Gender: Female
- Occupation: Stanfield Organization enforcer
- Family: Unnamed sister

Felicia "Snoop" Pearson is a semi-fictional character on the HBO series The Wire, played by the actress of the same name. She is a young female soldier in Marlo Stanfield's drug dealing organization and Chris Partlow's earliest protégé. As one of the experienced leaders of Stanfield's crew, she commits many ruthless murders on their behalf. She is a minor antagonist for season 3, later being the secondary antagonist of season 4 and season 5 with Chris Partlow.

== Character storyline ==
=== Season 3 ===
Snoop is a gangster who first appears midway through the escalating war between the Barksdale Organization and the Stanfield Organization, as one of the new recruits in training under Chris Partlow's wing. She is often seen hanging out with Chris and other Stanfield peers before eventually being assigned her first hit by Chris, who deems her ready to kill. She is responsible for killing the Barksdale soldier Rico, in a drive-by shooting on Poot Carr's corner.

She also takes part in Chris' efforts to foil an assassination attempt against Marlo Stanfield. After Omar Little and Brother Mouzone kill Stringer Bell, Snoop boasts that she and Chris Partlow had murdered him.

=== Season 4 ===
Snoop is shown a year later as an adept enforcer recognized as part of Marlo's trusted inner circle. She and Chris are assigned most of the hits that Marlo initiates, with Snoop assisting Chris in many murders by way of luring the victim to a secluded area and by helping to organize the method of concealment. She is never shown as the actual murderer. The pair disposes of the bodies by depositing them in abandoned buildings, covering them with quicklime and tarps, and boarding up the buildings again.

When they re-board the doors, they use the Hilti DX 460 MX powder-actuated nail gun that Snoop purchased in the first scene of the season. Later, the nail gun's distinctive nails become key clues: every house boarded up with those nails contains at least one body. Before the police discover this, however, Herc manages to pull them over and notices the nail gun, but is distracted by a lost camera. So Chris discards it, to Snoop's chagrin.

Among the people Chris and Snoop murder are Curtis "Lex" Anderson, Little Kevin, Old Face Andre, several New York drug dealers, and a security guard who talked back to Marlo. Tired of always concealing her crimes, Snoop tries to keep the guard's badge as a souvenir, but Chris throws the badge away. The pair were also responsible for intimidating Bodie Broadus into accepting Marlo's drug supply and for recruiting middle schooler Michael Lee into their organization. When Chris and Snoop dispose of Devar as a favour to Michael, Chris loses his usually calm demeanour and attacks him violently, Snoop is shocked . They also train the next generation of soldiers for Stanfield's organization, including O-Dog.

In "Final Grades", the last episode of season 4, Snoop alludes to being a lesbian while talking to Bunk during a routine police search.

=== Season 5 ===
In season 5, Snoop continues to act as muscle for Marlo, alongside Chris Partlow. Tension between her and Michael becomes a recurring theme. Snoop carries out orders from her superiors without question, but Michael tends to voice his opinion about certain situations. This occurs when Chris, Snoop, and Michael are about to make a hit on Junebug (a rival drug dealer spreading malicious but trivial words about Marlo's sexuality) and after Omar kills Savino Bratton.

Snoop is murdered by Michael when he rightly suspects that she is about to kill him, due to Marlo's suspicion that he had been talking to the police about the Stanfield organization. When Michael draws his gun, Snoop compliments him on his intelligence and asks him how he knew that she was going to kill him. She accepts her fate and nonchalantly looks into the car's wing mirror. Her final words are, "How my hair look, Mike?" Michael answers, "You look good, girl", then shoots her in the head.

== Production ==
=== Origins ===
Snoop's name is seen for the first time, very briefly, in a season 3 episode, written on a Post-it Note and being pinned up to the board in the Major Crimes Unit. Her name is also pinned on the board in "Boys of Summer" (season 4, episode 1). She can be seen for the first time in the widescreen version of "Hamsterdam" (season 3, episode 4), sitting with Justin and Fruit in the gymnasium during Colvin's speech, although in that episode's original broadcast release she is cropped from the shot.

Her name and picture are up on the details board under Chris Partlow as "Felicia Pearson AKA 'Snoop'". Her name can once again be seen briefly early in the season 5 episode "Transitions", as well as in Randy Wagstaff's police file in "The Dickensian Aspect". "Snoop" is the actress' nickname in real life.

== Reception ==
Several critics have praised Pearson's performance as especially frightening. Writer Stephen King called the character "perhaps the most terrifying female villain to ever appear in a television series".
