= Jermaine Crawford =

American actor (born 1992)

- Born: October 28, 1992 (age 33); Prince George's County, Maryland, U.S.
- Occupations: Actor, singer, songwriter
- Years active: 2006–present
- Relatives: Tristan Wilds (cousin)

Jermaine Crawford (born October 28, 1992) is an American actor best known for appearing on the HBO original series The Wire as Dukie Weems (2006–2008). He is a second cousin to fellow The Wire cast member and actor Tristan Wilds.

== Career ==
Crawford started performing at the age of three. He has had prominent roles in the theatrical productions of Children of Eden at the Ford Theatre directed by David Bell; Carousel and The Miracle Worker at the Olney Theatre, as directed by Bill Pasquanti; and, A Midsummer Night's Dream at the historic Shakespeare Theatre Company, as directed by Mark Lamos. He was also a youth spokesperson for the American Diabetes Association.

Crawford starred in the 2009 film adaptation of the Alvin Moore Jr. stage play A Mother's Prayer, which also features Johnny Gill, Robin Givens and Shirley Murdock, and more recently in the 2010 Joel Schumacher film Twelve.

== Filmography ==
=== Film ===
| Year | Title | Role | Notes |
|---|---|---|---|
| 2008 | Explicit Ills | Tony | |
| 2008 | An American Affair | Andre | |
| 2009 | A Mother's Prayer | Darren | |
| 2010 | Twelve | Nana | |
| 2011 | Damsels in Distress | Jimbo | |
| 2012 | Maladies | Teenager | |
| 2014 | Cru | Richard 'RJ' Hughes Jr. | |
| 2017 | Roxanne Roxanne | Park Jam MC | |
| 2019 | DC Noir | Joe | |
| 2020 | Three Pregnant Men | Julian | |

=== Television ===
| Year | Title | Role | Notes |
|---|---|---|---|
| 2006–2008 | The Wire | Dukie Weems | 23 episodes |
| 2009 | The Unusuals | Malcolm Nix | Episode: "Pilot" |
| 2010 | Past Life | Andre | Episode: "Pilot" |
| 2011 | Person of Interest | Michael Pope | Episode: "Pilot" |
| 2016 | The Get Down | Fernando | Episode: "Forget Safety, Be Notorious" |
| 2022 | We Own This City | Jaquan Dixon | 6 episodes |
| TBA | The End is Here | The Associate | Miniseries; episode: "The Agency" |
