= Michael Lee (The Wire) =

Character from The Wire

- The Wire character
- Tristan Wilds as Michael Lee
- First appearance: "Boys of Summer" (2006)
- Last appearance: "–30–" (2008)
- Created by: David Simon
- Portrayed by: Tristan Wilds

In-universe information
- Occupation: Drug dealer; Soldier for the Stanfield Organization; Stick-up man
- Family: Raylene Lee (mother); Aaron 'Bug' Manigault (half-brother)
- Date of birth: July 15, 1993

Michael Lee is a fictional character on the HBO drama The Wire, played by Tristan Wilds. He is a middle school pupil and a friend of Namond Brice, Randy Wagstaff, and Duquan "Dukie" Weems. More soft-spoken and composed than his friends, Michael takes on a leadership role among his peers. Michael is very protective of his younger half-brother Bug, to whom he is effectively a parent, and Dukie, who is often ridiculed by his peers for his poverty and poor hygiene.

Michael's mother Raylene is a drug addict, and he avoids discussing his home life because of his precarious family situation. It is strongly implied that he was sexually abused by Bug's father Devar, who is returning from prison. As he grows older, Michael pushes away many of his peers and acquaintances, including his boxing coach Cutty, and eventually his friends Randy and Dukie. He becomes a protégé of Marlo Stanfield's enforcer Chris Partlow, an unemotional killer who may also have been abused as a child. In his last scene, he is shown robbing drug dealers, implying he is set to take the place of Omar.

== Biography ==
=== Season 4 ===
Michael is interested in boxing and often works out at Dennis "Cutty" Wise's local gym. Michael distrusts male authority figures; he rebuffs both Cutty's offer to train him in boxing and Marlo Stanfield's offer of a no-strings-attached cash handout. Michael tells his friends, who accepted Marlo's money, that he is reluctant to feel like he owes anyone. Regardless, Marlo is impressed with Michael's strength of character in denying a handout and not budging, even after Stanfield personally confronts and insults him.

In order to provide new school supplies for himself and his brother, Michael temporarily takes over Namond's job as a runner for drug dealer Bodie Broadus. Bodie takes a strong interest in Michael and offers to employ him permanently, but Michael turns him down.

Marlo sends Chris Partlow to find out more about Michael. Chris offers Michael cash and protection to join Marlo's organization, but Michael turns down the offer, claiming that he must look out for his family first. Michael also turns down Randy's offer of paid work delivering fliers on Election Day, and refuses to work with Namond selling drugs.

Michael gets into trouble with math teacher Roland "Prezbo" Pryzbylewski, because he will not do his homework nor participate in classroom exercises. Pryzbylewski gives him detention, which Michael skips in order to pick up Bug from elementary school. Pryzbylewski learns from Randy and Dukie why Michael skipped and subsequently approaches Michael directly with an appeal to discuss any problems he may have. Michael does not confide in his teacher but begins to work harder in the class, completing his homework, and is a quick study when Pryzbylewski uses games of cards and dice to teach probability.

Cutty persistently encourages Michael to take an interest in boxing, but Michael continues to be wary of him. After Cutty takes Michael and Justin to a professional fight, Michael refuses to let Cutty drive him home after Justin is dropped off. Suspicious of Cutty's motives, Michael implies it's because Cutty tends to get involved with the mothers of boys who use the gym. Cutty continues to try to break down Michael's defenses, but Michael remains distrustful of him and later hints to his friends that Cutty might be a pederast, an untrue suspicion seemingly based on his friendliness with Michael. When Namond is attacked by rival drug dealers (including Bubbles' protégé Sherrod), Michael is there to support his friend. However, when Cutty asks Michael what Namond is getting into, Michael tells him it is none of their business.

When Bug's father (and Michael's step-father) Devar is paroled and returns to their home, Michael becomes desperate to get rid of him. It gradually becomes clear that Devar sexually abused Michael before going to prison, and that Raylene did nothing to protect Michael from the abuse. This is hinted by Michael's distrust in adult males, the negative attitude he displays when subjects involving sexuality are brought up, and his interactions with Raylene. It is confirmed later in "Took" (season 5, episode 7), when Bunk comes across Devar's prison record and says, "Look at you, you baby-bumping motherfucker"; and later, while grilling Michael, he says, "Look at you...not even blinking. Not that I blame you, after what this heinous motherfucker did to you".

Michael asks Randy what would happen if he were to call social services on his stepfather, and Randy, speaking from experience, says that Michael and Bug would be split up and would both be placed in group homes. Out of options, Michael turns to Marlo and Chris for help. Chris and Snoop nab Devar, taking him to one of their usual body dumps while Chris interrogates him about his sexual interest in young boys. Instead of his usual cold efficiency, Chris becomes consumed with rage, punching and kicking Devar to death.

Now in debt to Marlo's protection, Michael becomes a soldier in his drug operation, and evolves from soft-spoken introvert to cold-blooded killer. Marlo provides Michael and Bug with their own apartment and refers to Michael as Chris' "pup" when Michael is not around. When Michael moves into his new apartment, he offers Dukie a place to live. Later, at Cutty's gym, Michael beats Namond for teasing Dukie and runs out when Cutty breaks up the fight. Cutty tells Michael no one wants him there, but later feels guilty about it. When Cutty catches up with Michael on a street corner with Marlo's crew and attempts to apologize, Michael initially rebuffs him. Cutty persists, and Monk shoots him twice in the leg. Finally understanding that Cutty is on his side, Michael stops Monk from delivering a final headshot, then offers to wait with Cutty until the ambulance comes. Cutty, wanting to protect Michael, tells him to go with "his people".

In the final episode of season-4, Chris and Snoop are under suspicion for the vacant building murders (which stands at 22 discovered bodies). Due to their recent arrest, Chris and Snoop must step back from being Marlo's main enforcers for a time. Marlo thus has Michael carry out his first murder, while also having him take over as the boss of Bodie's old corner. Michael enlists Dukie and Kenard to join his crew, but continues to help Bug with his school work in his spare time.

=== Season 5 ===
More than a year later, Michael continues to work with the Stanfield Organization and still reports to Chris. His crew has changed somewhat, and while Dukie and Kenard remain, Spider and a young dealer named Marcus now work for him. The other dealers do not respect the weak Dukie and neglect his requests for updates on the corner's count. Michael decides to withdraw Dukie from the corner and pay him to look after Bug instead, promoting Spider in his place.

Chris and Snoop continue to train Michael as an enforcer. Michael is brought along to kill a man named Junebug after Marlo hears that Junebug has been spreading rumors about Marlo's sexuality. They show Michael the importance of preparation, arriving over an hour before the hit to scope out the scene and make sure there are no surprises. When Michael questions the necessity of the murder, since Junebug has not been confirmed as the origin of the rumors, Snoop angrily retorts that hearsay matters more than facts in protecting Marlo's reputation. Chris orders Michael to watch the back of the house and kill anyone who tries to escape, while he and Snoop enter from the front. Once inside, the older enforcers kill three adults, but a small child runs out the back door past Michael, who cannot bring himself to shoot the boy.

Following his involvement in the Junebug murders, Michael becomes socially withdrawn. Duquan, Michael, and Bug take a day trip to Six Flags. They enjoy their day, but when they return Monk confronts Michael about leaving his corner unattended.

Michael and his crew are arrested by Officer Anthony Colicchio, but no charges are filed. Raylene signs Michael out of jail and chastises him for not bringing Bug to see her more often. She wheedles Michael for money, saying she deserves it for signing him out of jail, but he refuses to pay her to do what any mother should.

Bunk Moreland questions Michael about his stepfather's murder, saying he doesn't blame Michael for having him killed because of the sexual abuse he suffered, but knows that Michael lacked the size and strength to commit a brutal murder like that himself. Michael refuses to tell Bunk anything.

Along with Chris, Snoop, and O-Dog, Michael participates in the devious counter-ambush of Omar Little in Monk's apartment, from which Omar barely escapes. After killing Savino Bratton (a former Barksdale enforcer who later became employed within the Stanfield Organization), Omar gets the drop on Michael on his corner, telling him to send a message to Marlo. With Omar in the streets terrorizing Marlo's corners, Michael questions why Chris and Snoop don't inform Marlo that Omar is casting aspersions on Marlo's reputation, so Marlo can take action. This and his questioning of other orders displeases Chris and causes a perceptible rift between Michael and Snoop.

When Marlo, Chris, Cheese, and Monk are all arrested in the culmination of the Stanfield investigation, Monk suspects Michael of turning informant. Although neither Marlo nor Chris believe Michael is a snitch, Marlo states that he is not willing to "stake his future on" that belief, and reluctantly orders Snoop, who is still at liberty, to kill Michael.

Snoop tells Michael that with everyone locked up, she needs him for some "serious business" and tells him there is no need to bring his gun, because she has a "clean one" for him. A suspicious Michael, following Chris' advice to check out any scene early, catches Snoop talking to the supposed target. Later, in Snoop's SUV, he mentions that he has to pee in order to get her to pull over into an alley. After pausing a beat, Michael brandishes his gun, and is complimented by Snoop for correctly deducing that she was going to kill him. As he inquires on what he had done for Marlo to put the hit on him, Snoop informs him that Chris was arrested and charged with killing Michael’s stepfather (something Chris had done as a favor to Michael) and the thanks he got for that was Michael talking to the police. Michael tries to convince her that he didn’t say anything to the police, but is also informed by Snoop that it was also because of how he acted around them, always apart from the group and constantly questioning orders. Snoop tells Michael that he was never a true part of their organization and he never could be. Accepting her fate, Snoop asks Michael how her hair looks, to which he responds by reassuring her that she looks good (another thing he picked up from Chris) and then shoots her in the head and flees the scene.

Now with a vehicle for the night, Michael has Dukie and Bug hurriedly pack and drive to Michael's aunt Carla's house in Howard County. Michael walks Bug to the door with a shoebox full of cash for Carla to take care of Bug with. After returning to Baltimore, Michael tells Dukie that it would be too dangerous for them to stay together. At Dukie's request, Michael drives him to the squalid stables where the arabber (junk man) Dukie has been helping lives among other homeless people and junkies. Dukie tries to make light of the situation by reminiscing about the day they threw water balloons filled with urine at terrace children, but Michael coldly responds that he doesn't remember it, and the two friends part ways. Dukie hesitates when he sees the junk man injecting heroin and turns back to Michael, but he has already left.

Michael goes into hiding, but eventually returns as a stickup man robbing drug dealers, replacing Omar Little. He robs Marlo's advisor Vinson in Vinson's rim shop, getting him to surrender his drug money by shooting him in the knee with a shotgun.
