= Homecoming (The Wire) =

- The Wire episode
- Episode no.: Season 3 Episode 6
- Directed by: Leslie Libman
- Story by: David Simon; Rafael Alvarez
- Teleplay by: Rafael Alvarez
- Original air date: October 31, 2004
- Running time: 57 minutes

Episode chronology
← Previous "Straight and True"	Next → "Back Burners"
- The Wire season 3

"Homecoming" is the 31st episode of American crime drama The Wire, also the sixth episode of the show's third season. The episode was written by Rafael Alvarez from a story by David Simon & Rafael Alvarez and was directed by Leslie Libman. It originally aired on October 31, 2004, on HBO in the U.S. In the episode, the Baltimore police take action after seeing negative outcomes from their designated drug dealing zones, Stringer Bell encounters difficulties in entering the real estate business, and Omar Little tampers with a witness to the murder of Tosha.

The episode had nearly 1.4 million viewers and had positive reviews from The Guardian and HitFix.

== Plot ==
After a political event, Cedric Daniels' wife Marla raises the possibility of reconciling. However, Cedric explains that he cannot promise any more than his continued support of her career, later telling Rhonda Pearlman that he feels he still owes her to fill the role of a supportive spouse. Tommy Carcetti again asks Theresa D'Agostino to run his campaign for mayor, suggesting that Baltimore's black vote will be split if incumbent Clarence Royce and Anthony Gray both run. Royce and Parker suggest to Ervin Burrell that he may not keep his job as police commissioner if the city's crime rate keeps rising.

In Homicide, Bunk tells Landsman that he will work on the double homicide of Tosha and Tank rather than wasting time on the missing gun; Landsman finally agrees. Bunk interviews Tosha's family and asks them to have Omar contact him. The word gets back to Omar, who catches up with the witness who identified him to Bunk and convinces him to change his story. Omar arranges a meeting with Bunk, telling him there is no victim in the case of the shooting. Bunk, enraged, talks about their shared past at Edmondson High School and says that the empathy and sense of community in their neighborhoods is all but gone. In the Western, Colvin has Carver and his other men forcibly relocate any straggling dealers into Hamsterdam.

Despite the positive effect Hamsterdam has on the wider neighborhood, Colvin notices one resident remaining in the zone. When the resident refuses to move, Colvin approaches Foerster with the necessary paperwork, telling him the woman is a witness in a drug case. Colvin again finds himself relying on information from the Major Case Unit, and requests their assistance in targeting both the Barksdales and the Stanfields. Meanwhile, Bell and Avon are dismayed to find costs skyrocketing at their development site. They join Slim Charles in surveying territory. Avon questions why the Barksdales are conceding their best territory to Marlo without a fight and resolves to get his corners back. Bell and Bodie agree to move a small part of their business to Hamsterdam to test the waters. Avon orders Slim Charles to attack Marlo using Cutty and other muscle.

Bell is told that construction at the site is being held up by city hall. In a meeting with Bell, State Senator Clay Davis demands $25,000 to move things ahead. Cutty and Slim Charles devise a plan of attack and explain it to their crew. However, the plan goes awry when the getaway driver, Chipper, makes his move too early and allows himself and Country to get killed by Marlo's crew. When Avon and Bell disagree on their next move, Slim Charles and Cutty volunteer to handle things themselves. Marlo's advisor Vinson warns him to expect retribution from Avon. Marlo readies his soldiers Snoop and Partlow for the coming gang war. Brianna gives her blessing for Donette to pursue her relationship with Bell, but is startled by McNulty's allegation that D'Angelo's death was not a suicide.

Cutty and Slim Charles come across Fruit's crew with their guard down. Cutty has a shot lined up on Fruit, but allows him to escape. When Avon expresses his disappointment, Cutty admits that he couldn't shoot Fruit because "the game" is no longer part of him and that he wants no further involvement. Avon, still respectful of Cutty, lets him go on good terms. Meanwhile, McNulty and Greggs mistakenly report to Daniels that Marlo is a new member of the Barksdales, erroneously concluding that Marlo's territory belongs to Bell. Despite the detectives' urging, Daniels rules that as long as Bell isn't openly violent, they have no call to investigate him. McNulty and Greggs meet with a state's attorney in Anne Arundel County to discuss reopening D'Angelo's case, but are told that another murder will not be put on the county's books without a suspect. The two go drinking and discuss their relationship difficulties.

Bubbles tells Greggs about the botched gunfight and corrects her about the relationship between the Stanfield and Barksdale crews. She and McNulty report the new killings to Daniels, who chastises them for insubordination. Acting on a plan with Greggs, McNulty presents the case to Colvin, who sees that he is going behind Daniels' back. The next day, Colvin, Rawls and Burrell meet with Daniels to give him his new assignment.

== Production ==
=== Epigraph ===
Just a gangster, I suppose.

— Avon Barksdale

Barksdale says this in response to Stringer Bell wanting to move on from drug dealing to legitimate business, explaining: "I ain't no suit-wearing businessman like you. I'm just a gangster, I suppose."

=== Credits ===
==== Starring cast ====
Although credited, Clarke Peters, Jim True-Frost, and Corey Parker Robinson do not appear in this episode.

==== Guest stars ====
1. Glynn Turman as Mayor Clarence Royce
2. Isiah Whitlock, Jr. as Senator Clayton "Clay" Davis
3. Chad L. Coleman as Dennis "Cutty" Wise
4. Jamie Hector as Marlo Stanfield
5. Maria Broom as Marla Daniels
6. Michael Hyatt as Brianna Barksdale
7. Delaney Williams as Sergeant Jay Landsman
8. Brandy Burre as Theresa D'Agostino
9. Benjamin Busch as Officer Anthony Colicchio
10. Jay Landsman as Lieutenant Dennis Mello
11. Megan Anderson as Jen Carcetti
12. Shamyl Brown as Donette
13. Verna Lee Day as Mrs. Hazel
14. Anwan Glover as Slim Charles
15. Kelli R. Brown as Kimmy
16. Nina Hodoruk as State's Attorney Kendall Remnick
17. Richard DeAngelis as Colonel Raymond Foerster
18. Michael Salconi as Officer Michael Santangelo
19. Ernest Waddell as Dante
20. Mayo Best as Gerard
21. Richard Burton as Sean "Shamrock" McGinty
22. Norris Davis as Vinson
23. Brandon Fobbs as Fruit
24. Addison Switzer as Country
25. Gbenga Akinnagbe as Chris Partlow
26. Christopher Mann as Councilman Tony Gray
27. Cleo Reginald Pizana as Chief of Staff Coleman Parker
28. Frederick Strother as State Delegate Odell Watkins
29. Michael Willis as Andy Krawczyk

==== Uncredited appearances ====
- R. Emery Bright as Community Relations Sergeant
- Edward Green as Spider
- Felicia Pearson as Snoop
- Ryan Sands as Officer Lloyd "Truck" Garrick
- Esley Tate as Boo
- Joshua Dixon as Chipper
- Unknown as Bruiser

=== First appearances ===
- Snoop: Young female enforcer in the Stanfield organization.

== Reception ==
On its debut, "Homecoming" had nearly 1.42 million viewers, ranked third by Nielsen Media Research in U.S. premium cable ratings for the week ending October 31, 2004.

For HitFix, Alan Sepinwall praised the acting of Wendell Pierce and Michael K. Williams in Bunk's angry conversation with Omar, as it was a rare emotional moment for Bunk. For Omar, Sepinwall found it "startling to have him treated not as the lovable rogue we all know, but as a blight on the community every bit as bad as Stringer or Marlo." Paul Owen of The Guardian called this episode "packed with memorable scenes" and noted an element added to Stringer Bell: "While his ideas for improving the drug game almost always have great merit, Stringer finds it difficult to negotiate the labyrinthine procedures of local government and the housing industry he seeks to join, and his ignorance is taken advantage of, particularly by Davis." In a review of earlier episode "Hamsterdam" in The Guardian, Owen also praised the character development of Cutty "as a force for good and even for hope".
