= Middle Ground (The Wire) =

- The Wire episode
- Episode no.: Season 3 Episode 11
- Directed by: Joe Chappelle
- Story by: David Simon; George Pelecanos
- Teleplay by: George Pelecanos
- Original air date: December 12, 2004
- Running time: 58 minutes

Episode chronology
← Previous "Reformation"	Next → "Mission Accomplished"

"Middle Ground" is the 11th episode of the third season of the HBO original series The Wire. The episode was written by George Pelecanos from a story by David Simon & George Pelecanos and was directed by Joe Chappelle. It originally aired on December 12, 2004. The episode was nominated for the Primetime Emmy Award for Outstanding Writing for a Drama Series.

== Plot ==
On his way home, Omar is surprised by Brother Mouzone. During a tense standoff, Mouzone assures Omar that Dante is still alive and did not give him up easily. Eventually, Mouzone puts down his weapon and tells Omar that he has something to ask him. At the Baltimore Police, Rawls recommends sidestepping major political fallout from Hamsterdam by shutting it down immediately. However, Mayor Royce – who is deliberating what to do with his staff – is reluctant to authorize a police crackdown on the free zones. Burrell, believing that Royce is planning to scapegoat the police for the fiasco, decides to spin the story in the department's favor and contacts Carcetti.

Royce is told by Demper and health officials that keeping Hamsterdam open would serve the common good from a law enforcement and public health standpoint. However, Parker and Watkins argue for the zones to be shut down, with Watkins warning the mayor that he will lose support of the ministers and city hall – and be subject to action from both the state government and the Justice Department – as soon as Hamsterdam is publicized. However, with a 14% decrease in felonies district-wide, Royce believes he can spin the Hamsterdam situation to his advantage. Burrell meets with Carcetti and tells him all about Hamsterdam, blaming Royce for the intense pressure they have been putting on the department to reduce crime. He asks Carcetti to give the story to Gray, as he hopes to endear himself to the next mayor now that he is burning his bridges with Royce.

D'Agostino suggests that Carcetti talk to Colvin to get his side of the story. After Carcetti tracks him at home, Colvin gives Carcetti a tour of the Western, showing him the positive impact his efforts have made — empty drug corners and real police work being done for the community. Colvin takes Carcetti to a neighborhood council meeting where residents credit Hamsterdam with making the district safer. Finally, Colvin tours Hamsterdam itself, explaining that he wanted to try something different for dealing with the drug problem. Carcetti sees open drug dealing and is told by Colvin that it's best if he explores the area on his own, assuring him that the area is safe and offering to wait in the car for him to return. As Carcetti walks through the area, we see only his horrified and dismayed face.

Bell meets with Levy to discuss the lack of progress he sees in his development work despite paying Senator Davis. Levy tells Stringer that Davis is a "gonif," the Yiddish word for "thief," with a reputation for pocketing bribes for himself. Bell angrily seeks out Avon, only for Slim Charles's new soldiers to keep him from his partner. Bell demands that Slim Charles kill Davis, not knowing that Avon is listening to the conversation. Avon then enters the room and mocks the fact that Stringer wants to hit a state senator. Avon says that killing a "downtown" man like Davis would incur the wrath of the state police and federal government and would require a "Day of the Jackal"-type assassination in order to pull it off. Avon says that if Stringer has lost money then he should handle it like a businessman rather than like a gangster, and that the financial losses are Stringer's responsibility, not the organization's.

Stringer calls and arranges a meeting with Colvin. He offers Colvin more information about Avon. Stringer claims that Avon is like his brother but he cannot let him continue his war with Marlo Stanfield. Stringer tells Colvin that he came to him because of his reputation as the man who created Hamsterdam. He tells Colvin about Avon's wartime safehouse and gives him the address. Colvin asks about his motives and Stringer insists that his actions are purely business-driven. To little avail, he implores Colvin to guarantee that any police strike against Avon results in charges light enough to ensure that Avon does fewer than five years in prison. Meanwhile, Avon is in a barbershop getting a haircut. Brother Mouzone visits him and tells him that he has learned through Omar that Stringer set him up. Avon offers to pay for Stringer's actions with money. Brother Mouzone tells Avon that money will not settle the debt and that Avon must give up Stringer in order to maintain his word and reputation and, thus, continue dealing with New York. Avon is forced to give up Stringer to appease Mouzone and maintain his business contact.

Avon and Stringer meet for a late-night drink. Stringer apologizes for not dealing with Marlo Stanfield sooner. Avon is nostalgic about the shoplifting days of their youth, retelling a story of Stringer's failed heist of a badminton set. The story is illuminating to their current situation, as Stringer is driven to play what Avon calls "away games" and leave his gangster past behind. Avon asks Stringer to dream with him and Stringer tells him they don't need to dream because they own so much now, including real estate, that is legal. Stringer tells Avon that he can't drink too much since he is visiting the development site the following day. Avon asks what time Stringer plans to meet with the property developer (so that he can tell Mouzone where to find him). Stringer responds awkwardly, and the two men exchange more conversation before sharing an embrace, while each knows that he is betraying the other.

=== Western district ===
In Hamsterdam, Bubbles continues to make his living supplying young dealers with T-shirts from a shopping cart. A young homeless boy questions Bubbles about his income and then suggests that he try selling hoodies now that the season is changing. Meanwhile, Bubbles's protégé Johnny is "schooled" by another fellow user in Hamsterdam not to use so much heroin that he "falls out," meaning to take a fatal dose, and he notices out the window that Bubbles is now working with the homeless boy.

Dennis "Cutty" Wise has built a small following for his community boxing gym, including some drug dealers, Justin and Spider. The children using the facility mock the equipment because it is in a state of disrepair. Seeking funds for the gym, Cutty visits Bodie Broadus and asks him to arrange a meeting with Avon. Cutty explains that he didn't feel right approaching Avon directly because of the way he left things with him.

Avon meets with Cutty at his base of operations. Cutty gives him a sales pitch and talks about Avon's boxing past before Avon eventually tires of his efforts. He asks how much money he needs, to which Cutty hesitantly states $10,000. Avon and Slim Charles erupt in laughter and then give him five thousand extra, much to the surprise of Cutty, before telling him to take care of his young charges. With the new equipment in place, Cutty's boxers are eager to spar, and he offers to organize a match with another gym. At the sparring match Cutty's boxers are bested by much smaller boxers, but Cutty gives them respect for lasting through each round. In particular he congratulates Justin for his attitude and heart.

=== Major case unit ===
Lieutenant Cedric Daniels updates the investigative board with a photo of Barksdale lieutenant Shamrock. Jimmy McNulty, Lester Freamon and Caroline Massey monitor their wiretapped burners. They record a call between Shamrock and Bodie Broadus - Bodie asks for a face to face meeting with "the man", who they assume is Stringer Bell. However, there is no phone call from Shamrock's phone to Stringer to arrange the meeting. Freamon and McNulty later explain to ASA Rhonda Pearlman that Stringer has isolated himself from the rest of the phone network by only talking to Shamrock and providing Shamrock with a separate phone for their communications. Freamon suggests that they can have everyone in the Barksdale organization from Shamrock down on a conspiracy charge with a week of monitoring these wiretaps, but to collect evidence against Bell and Barksdale they need to pluck cellphone numbers out of the air. This comment prompts McNulty to leave.

McNulty arranges a meeting with Fitz to discuss the possibility of doing exactly what Freamon suggested. McNulty asks Fitz about equipment that picks up numbers dialed on cellular phones nearby. Fitz tells McNulty that the equipment he needs is already available to city police because of a Homeland Security grant. McNulty retrieves the machine from the police department basement. McNulty and Freamon set up the machine in a vacant apartment opposite Stringer's photocopying business. They record all cell phone numbers using the nearby tower for signal. They narrow the field back at the detail office by tying specific times that Stringer would be on the phone to their data by monitoring calls to Shamrock.

While the unit is monitoring him, Stringer gets a call requesting a meeting. He changes the SIM card in his cell phone so that he can call back on another number. Shamrock then calls Bodie to tell him a meeting has been arranged. This gives the unit their baseline set of call data. Next Stringer uses his business number to call Colvin on his cell phone and Lester notes the call. He checks with McNulty, who recommends they wait and see what the connection gives them.

Shortly afterwards Freamon pins down Stringer's cell phone number. Both McNulty and Freamon are worried that the cell phone may not last long and they simultaneously contact Daniels and Pearlman. Daniels calls in a favor from Fitz to get the wiretap organized by the end of the day, cutting through potential delays from the wireless companies. Phelan signs the wiretap affidavit and recognizes Bell's name from the previous investigation. Phelan still faces animosity from McNulty and tells him to let it go for his own sake. Fitz delivers on his promise by falsely telling the bureau that Bell's given name is "Ahmed", a name the bureau associates with its counter-terrorism priorities.

Officer Massey gives McNulty a message from D'Agostino. McNulty meets D'Agostino for dinner. She claims she is there to renew their relationship and then quickly begins to probe him for information about Hamsterdam and Colvin. He sees through her feigned interest in him and walks out of the dinner. She might have also been using McNulty for information about the case to give to Carcetti.

The next day the unit records Stringer talking to Shamrock. Shamrock mentions contract killers on the phone, so although Stringer notices his mistake, the unit has the evidence it has worked hard for. The line spoken by Shamrock, "Oh, and that other thing, them two hitters you asked after, they good with it" harks back to Slim Charles' earlier refusal to assassinate Clay Davis, and reveals that Stringer still intended to kill the senator.

=== Stringer ===
When Stringer arrives at the development site, Omar and Brother Mouzone are waiting for him. Omar bursts into his meeting with Andy Krawczyk and kills Stringer's bodyguard. Stringer tries to run, fleeing up the staircase where he finds Mouzone waiting. Krawczyk cowers away from Omar, who leaves him and calmly pursues Bell up the stairs. Bell is trapped between Omar and Mouzone with no escape route. He tells them that he is now clean and tries to convince them that he is worth more to them alive than dead. Omar informs Stringer that Avon gave him up because of his duplicity. Stringer admits there is nothing he can say to stop them from killing him, at which point Omar displays a slight look of hesitation, savoring the moment. Stringer then orders them to get on with it, at which point first Mouzone and then Omar both open fire, shooting him repeatedly in the chest. After a moment of silence, the two calmly withdraw from the room without a word, as Stringer's body lies splayed on the floor. Outside the window on the building opposite is a sign for Stringer's B&B Enterprises.

== Production ==
=== Title reference ===
Mayor Royce says that they need to find a "middle ground" as a way to keep Hamsterdam alive while avoiding political suicide. The title also refers to the compromise made between Omar and Brother Mouzone to pursue their common goal, and alludes to the meeting between Stringer Bell and Colvin.

=== Epigraph ===
We ain't gotta dream no more, man.

— Stringer Bell

The phrase is said to Avon Barksdale in regard to how much they have accomplished in their endeavors, suggesting that the pair do not have to dream about success anymore because they have all the money and the power they need.

=== Credits ===
==== Starring cast ====
Although credited, Wendell Pierce, Jim True-Frost, Seth Gilliam, and Domenick Lombardozzi do not appear in this episode.

==== Guest stars ====
1. Glynn Turman as Mayor Clarence Royce
2. Peter Gerety as Judge Daniel Phelan
3. Chad L. Coleman as Dennis "Cutty" Wise
4. Anwan Glover as Slim Charles
5. Brandy Burre as Theresa D'Agostino
6. Leo Fitzpatrick as Johnny Weeks
7. Michael Potts as Brother Mouzone
8. Justin Burley as Justin
9. Robert F. Chew as Proposition Joe
10. Michael Kostroff as Maurice Levy
11. Cleo Reginald Pizana as Chief of Staff Coleman Parker
12. Kurt L. Schmoke as Health Commissioner
13. Frederick Strother as State Delegate Odell Watkins
14. William Zielinski as Gene - public health academic
15. R. Emery Bright as Community Relations Sergeant
16. Tony A. Head as Major Reed
17. Kay Lawal as Community Centre Meeting Woman
18. Doug Olear as Special Agent Terrence "Fitz" Fitzhugh
19. Michael Willis as Andy Krawczyk
20. Derren M. Fuentes as Lieutenant Torret
21. Edward Green as Spider
22. Joilet F. Harris as Officer Caroline Massey
23. Dennis Lehane as Officer Sullivan
24. Dameion Leslie as Unknown

==== Uncredited appearances ====
- Richard Burton as Shamrock
- Bobby J. Brown as Officer Bobby Brown
- Alana Campbelle as Mayor's Assistant
- Marty Lodge as Banisky - Baltimore Sun reporter
- Gil Deeble as Hucklebuck
- Raw Leiba as Stringer's Bodyguard
- Michael Noel as FBI Computer Technician

=== First appearances ===
This episode marks the first appearance of Kurt L. Schmoke as Baltimore Health Commissioner. Schmoke is a real-life former mayor of Baltimore and has strong views against the drug war and in favor of drug decriminalization. He acts as an advisor to the fictional mayor after Major Colvin has legalized drugs in a portion of the city, and his character's feelings mirror his own politics.

== Reception ==
=== Critical response ===
The episode received unanimous praise from television critics and is considered by many to be the best episode in the entire series. The Futon Critic named it the ninth best episode of 2004, commenting that the show is not shy about killing off characters, but was still surprised about Stringer Bell's death. George Pelecanos, who co-wrote the episode with David Simon, described "Middle Ground" as "the best thing I'll ever have my name on."

=== Awards and nominations ===
"Middle Ground" received the show's first Emmy nomination, for writers David Simon and George Pelecanos in the category Outstanding Writing for a Drama Series. Following the show's nomination, Variety printed an article with an anonymous member of the Academy of Television Arts & Sciences explaining why they thought the show was not recognized in more categories. They postulated that the show's complex narrative made it impenetrable to first time viewers, that the location meant that the cast and crew were "out of sight, out of mind" to voters, and the majority California based voters have little connection to the drug markets of Baltimore. Tim Goodman of the San Francisco Chronicle has cited the lack of Emmy recognition for the show as "an egregious oversight." Salon has written that the show is typical of the crime dramas that the Emmy awards have recognized in the past and called the lack of recognition "a sad case." David Simon suggested the lack of recognition was due to the show's small audience; however, Salon refuted this and postulated that one of the major factors in winning an Emmy is having a recognizable producer who draws blocs of votes from his contacts in the industry - something The Wire lacks.
