= Unto Others (The Wire) =

- The Wire episode
- Episode no.: Season 4 Episode 7
- Directed by: Anthony Hemingway
- Story by: Ed Burns; William F. Zorzi
- Teleplay by: William F. Zorzi
- Original air date: October 29, 2006
- Running time: 58 minutes

Episode chronology
← Previous "Margin of Error"	Next → "Corner Boys"

"Unto Others" is the seventh episode of the fourth season of the HBO original series The Wire. Written by William F. Zorzi from a story by Ed Burns & William F. Zorzi, and directed by Anthony Hemingway, it originally aired on October 29, 2006.

== Plot summary ==
=== Omar ===
Omar Little is attacked in prison, and stabs his assailant as a warning to the others who might try to kill him. Butchie's men tell Omar that the bounty on his head was placed by Marlo Stanfield. Omar gets a cell phone when he asks if they can help him make a call. He tells his bodyguards that he is phoning the police because he is owed a favor.

=== Homicide ===
Detectives Ed Norris and Kima Greggs bring in a jailhouse informant who has offered them information on the Braddock murder case. Sergeant Jay Landsman observes the informant's arrival; when he remarks on their progress, Greggs angrily reminds him that their investigation has been slowed by political interference. Lester Freamon makes miniature furniture at his desk and Landsman is impressed with the money he makes from his hobby.

Later, Freamon discusses the case with Greggs and convinces her to interview their main suspect Wardell — the man that Braddock was set to witness against.

Back at headquarters, Bunk tries to convince Detectives Crutchfield and Vernon Holley to reopen Omar's case based on his claims of innocence. Crutchfield refuses to entertain the possibility that Omar is innocent and is angry that Bunk is interfering.

Maurice Levy is Anthony Wardell's attorney. He allows his client to undergo the polygraph, knowing that it is a sign of desperation from the investigators. When the polygraph technician tells Greggs outside the room that he could make it go either way, she is disgusted. Her partner explains that it is an open secret that the polygraph is unreliable and is used as an interrogation and coercion tool by the police. On returning to the room, Levy explains his rationale behind subjecting Wardell to the polygraph: his client is innocent. Wardell tells Greggs that he would not have killed Braddock because he is a relative.

After the polygraph test, Bunk approaches Ilene Nathan with Omar's card. She is uninterested, saying that she offered help on a light felony at most. Bunk convinces her to move him to a safer facility, and she tells Bunk she now considers the debt paid.

Greggs reviews the Braddock case and picks out a detail: no one in the canvas noticed the gunshot. This prompts her to revisit the scene of the shooting, where she identifies a ricochet that she traces back down the alley to other signs of gunfire, eventually finding broken bottles outside a backyard. She finds a bullet lodged in a discarded chest of drawers and finally some potatoes that have been shot through in the back yard. Greggs draws her weapon and enters the house. Greggs later tells Norris she has solved the case and shows him the murder weapon pulled out of the house. Apparently, Braddock was killed by a stray bullet while someone was attempting target practice, using the potatoes as suppressors.

=== Politics ===
Tommy Carcetti meets with a former mayor, Tony, for advice on beginning his term. Tony tells him a story of being forced to "eat shit" from the various constituent interests of the city, a pattern that continued throughout his term and eventually led him to forgo standing for re-election.

Carcetti and Norman Wilson have an amicable meeting with Mayor Clarence Royce and his Chief of Staff Coleman Parker. They discuss the ins and outs of their campaigns. Carcetti mentions that Theresa D'Agostino has a new role with the DCCC. Carcetti claims the last-second move with the slumlord pamphlets was ingenious; however, Royce and Parker laughingly point out that the pamphlets were not officially endorsed by anyone on Royce's campaign team.

Rhonda Pearlman meets with the new state's attorney, Rupert Bond. Thinking she will likely be replaced by an African American attorney, she is surprised when he offers her the Violent Crimes Unit post. Bond states that he is impressed with her record and courage and wants the right prosecutors to help run the States' Attorney for Baltimore office. The post has opened as he is promoting Ilene Nathan to second deputy state's attorney. From the looks of it, Bond appears more interested in criminal prosecutions than his predecessor, Steven Demper, who was most interested in his elected position — often dismissing cases to maintain a favorable conviction rate.

Western District commander Cedric Daniels attends a COMSTAT meeting chaired by commissioner Ervin Burrell and his deputy William Rawls. Daniels tells his commanders that the homicide rate has dropped while other felony rates have risen, but refuses to take credit. Carcetti arrives to observe the meeting and opts to sit next to Rawls rather than Burrell, to the latter's dismay. Daniels tells them of his strategy of putting two-man cars on the worst drug corners while devoting his resources as much as possible to pursuing good felony cases. Burrell becomes angered when Daniels claims that he refuses to force street level arrests. He is further affronted when Daniels tells them that many of his officers are insufficiently trained to pursue quality cases.

Carcetti meets with Wilson, State Delegate Watkins and Gerry to discuss their first move in office. Carcetti and Watkins agree Ervin Burrell should be replaced as Commissioner, but Watkins and Wilson point out the negative optics of a white mayor firing an African American Police Commissioner. Carcetti notes that the pay, location, and talent pool are not sufficient to replace Burrell with another African American, and concludes that he is stuck with Burrell.

Carcetti takes a ride along with Southern District officers. Major Cantrell is surprised when he declines to travel with shift lieutenant Grayson, but impressed that Carcetti is interested in understanding the day-to-day of the district. Grayson assigns him to officers Macfarlane and Ginter. They are called to a shooting where they view Daniels as the duty officer. Carcetti is impressed with Daniels' professionalism and is told that Daniels is "not as bad as some" by the Southern District officers.

=== Marlo ===
Marlo Stanfield tells Proposition Joe of his failed efforts to flush out whoever has been investigating him. Joe recommends that Marlo steal the surveillance camera that he knows has been set up on him: federal agents have enough funding to let the camera go if they had set it up, but local police will come looking for it.

=== Major Case Unit ===
Sergeant Thomas "Herc" Hauk and Detective Leander Sydnor realise that the surveillance camera has been stolen. Herc worries that Lieutenant Charlie Marimow will use the theft to end his career. Ellis Carver remembers Randy and his plan to phone Bunk about it. He offers Herc a chance to talk to Randy before he passes him on. Carver phones Bunk and leaves a message with Crutchfield who, angry at Bunk for interfering in Omar's murder case, promptly throws it away.

Carver later presents Randy to Herc and Sydnor and urges them to look after him. Herc takes Randy to an interview room and buys him food. Despite Carver telling him that Randy knows about a murder, Herc's first question is about the security camera. Randy recounts the events leading up to Lex's murder. He gives them Little Kevin's name and tells them that Chris and Snoop killed Lex. Herc becomes frustrated as he realizes that Randy's information is second-hand and tries to intimidate him into saying he was present when Lex was killed. Sydnor is dismayed at Herc's aggressive approach. Herc gives up and returns Randy home. Randy asks them to drop him off down the block so he isn't seen with the police. Afterward Herc complains to Sydnor that Carver was mistaken when he said Randy could give them a murder. He decides to attack Marlo head-on to retrieve the camera.

=== Cutty ===
Dennis "Cutty" Wise finally tracks his absentee welterweight Spider down and finds him selling drugs on a corner with Jamal. Spider initially tries to walk away, but becomes confrontational when Cutty tries to apologize for sleeping with Spider's mother. Later, Cutty apologizes to his budding boxers for his recent womanizing and the effect it may have on them.

=== School ===
Michael Lee and Karim Williams play poker during their lunch break. Roland "Prez" Pryzbylewski notices Karim playing with money and tells the boys that he doesn't mind them eating in his classroom as long as they don't gamble. Michael wins the hand and Prez tells Karim about betting based on the odds. Michael is intrigued and asks for more information. Realizing that the children are interested, Prez visits Donnelly to ask if the school has any board games. She directs him to their book storage room and gives him the key along with a firm reminder to stay on curriculum.

Prez takes Duquan "Dukie" Weems with him to the store room and raids the board game boxes for dice. Prez makes several other discoveries, including brand new math text books and unopened computers.

After school Michael visits Namond Brice, who has set himself up as a crew chief selling drugs at his mother's urging. Namond's workers include Donut and Kenard. Michael notices members of a rival drug crew who are unhappy with Namond moving in on their territory, but Namond does not believe they will be a problem. The rival crew chief tells his dealers, who include Sherrod and Shaun Williams, to follow Namond when he leaves and give him a beating. They follow Namond to Cutty's gym, taking cocaine to get them ready for the task. Sherrod approaches Namond as he leaves the gym and warns him to stay away from their spot. They begin to fight before Cutty breaks them up. Cutty angrily questions Namond about what happened and then sends him home. He asks Michael what Namond has gotten into, but Michael tells him it is not either of their business.

Assistant Principal Marcia Donnelly visits Prez's math class to update him about a rape allegation made by a female student, Tiff. She has admitted that she had consensual sex with two boys, thus clearing them of any law-breaking and allowing Randy Wagstaff to return to school after being suspended for acting as a lookout for the others. When Donnelly leaves Prez begins to teach; he has set up a computer for a special class project and has the new textbooks for his students.

Namond attends his separate class, part of a University of Maryland-funded investigation targeting prevention of repeat violent offender behavior at the school level. Howard "Bunny" Colvin oversees the class with Dr. David Parenti. Two specialist teachers try to control the children. One girl, Chandra, will not stop brushing her hair, so she is removed from the class. When she returns, Namond repeatedly acts out and tries to get himself suspended. The class has a no-suspension policy and he is simply removed from the class temporarily instead.

Later, Namond convenes with Donut, Byron and Kenard on a new corner. He tells them they are starting late because his plan to get out of school early failed. Namond puts Byron in charge of the stash. Kenard complains about their change in location.

Cutty visits the school to meet with Donnelly about her program to secure funding by having him round up truant children for a day in September and October. He hoped to be doing something more meaningful and decides to quit. He meets with his old flame Grace Sampson on his way out and learns that she moved to Edward Tilghman. He wishes her well before leaving.

Namond is removed from class again and refuses to talk to Colvin or the specialist teacher, instead swearing every time he is spoken to. Back in class, Albert acts out after being asked to read a book. Colvin is dismayed at the difficulty of the task they have taken on, while Parenti is fascinated by the clinical aspects of the behavior exhibited.

A different picture unfolds in Prez's math class. The children are enjoying his lesson plan of playing dice games to learn probability. Randy has missed earlier lessons so his bets are less informed than Michael's, but he learns quickly when he loses a round. Sampson observes the lesson and Prez explains his thinking: trick them into thinking they aren't learning and they do.

=== Bubbles ===
Bubbles finds himself missing Sherrod and visits Edward Tilghman Middle School in hopes of finding him. He talks to Donnelly, still posing as Sherrod's uncle. Donnelly tells him that Sherrod is on the truant list. Bubbles bumps into Prez on his way out and jokes that he will keep his undercover identity secret. Bubbles continues his search for Sherrod as he plies his mobile depot trade. He has added unlicensed DVDs to his stock. He is accosted by the same drug addict that robbed him before; the man takes his money and his drugs as well as stealing from his cart. Bubbles waves down a passing squad car for assistance. The officer, Eddie Walker, notices Bubbles' DVDs and threatens him with fines for copyright infringement as well as selling on the street without a license, and takes some of the DVDs and Bubbles' merchandise and drives off as Bubbles accuses him of stealing.

Bubbles is robbed by the same man a third time shortly afterwards and takes another beating. Bubbles finally tracks Sherrod down to the corner where he is working and asks him to come home. He notices that Sherrod has begun using drugs. When Bubbles gets home, Sherrod has not come back.

== Production ==
This episode marks the first time Bubbles's real name is used when Marcia Donnelly calls him "Mr. Cousins".

This is the second time the Italian film L'ultimo bacio appears on the show; when a bootleg DVD is taken by Officer Walker it appears to be a copy of this film. The first appearance was in the third season, in the episode "All Due Respect".

In the episode's opening scene, Omar is shown reading Ghettoheat by Hickson.

In the second scene, over the radio at Bubbles', a columnist can be heard describing his job as reminiscent to the one of David Simon.

=== Title reference ===
The reference is from the proverb "Do unto others as you would have done to yourself". This ties into the golden rule Bunk mentions to Omar, who is facing retribution from many of his former victims in prison. It also references Bunk's interference in Holley's and Crutchfield's homicide case, after which Crutchfield threatens to interfere with the next case Bunk catches.

=== Epigraph ===
Aw yeah. That golden rule.

— The Bunk

Bunk says this to Omar during their interrogation.

=== Credits ===
==== Starring cast ====
Although credited Dominic West does not appear in this episode.

==== Guest stars ====
- Jermaine Crawford as Duquan "Dukie" Weems
- Maestro Harrell as Randy Wagstaff
- Julito McCullum as Namond Brice
- Tristan Wilds as Michael Lee
- Robert F. Chew as Proposition Joe
- Tootsie Duvall as Assistant Principal Marcia Donnelly
- Dravon James as Mrs. Grace Sampson
- Ed Norris as Detective Ed Norris
- Michael Kostroff as Maurice Levy
- Delaney Williams as Sergeant Jay Landsman
- Sam Coppola as Young Tony – Former Mayor
- Gregory L. Williams as Detective Michael Crutchfield
- Brian Anthony Wilson as Detective Vernon Holley
- Cleo Reginald Pizana as Chief of Staff Coleman Parker
- Susan Rome as Assistant State's Attorney Ilene Nathan
- Frederick Strother as State Delegate Odell Watkins
- Karen Vicks as Gerry
- Stacie Davis as Miss Duquette
- Dan DeLuca as Dr. David Parenti
- Dion Graham as State's Attorney Rupert Bond
- Katherine Schmoke as Miss Mason
- Greg Ainsworth as Richard Switowski – Polygraph technician
- Nathan Corbett as Donut
- Thuliso Dingwall as Kenard
- Edward Green as Spider
- Jeffrey Lorenzo as Karim Williams
- Davone Cooper as Darnell Tyson
- Shenia Hatchett as Unknown
- Na'Dria Jennings as Chandra Porter
- Rakiya Orange as Charlene Young
- Gordon Timothy as Anthony Wardell – murder suspect
- Larry Andrews as Donnie
- Armando Cadogan, Jr. as Bubbles' Tormenter
- Rashad Orange as Sherrod
- Derrick Purvey as Big Guy
- Daniel Lee Robertson III as Shaun Williams

==== Uncredited appearances ====
- Gbenga Akkinagbe as Chris Partlow
- Felicia Pearson as Snoop
- Anwan Glover as Slim Charles
- Jonnie Louis Brown as Officer Eddie Walker
- Justin Burley as Justin
- Taylor King as Zenobia Dawson
- Rico Sterling as Calvin
- Dave Trovato as Major Cantrell
- Melissa D. Madison as Lieutenant Grayson
- Jonathon Ruckman as Officer McFarlane
- Dan Franko as Officer Ginter
- James Lewis as Marvin
- Unknown as Spider's Corner Boy
- Unknown as Sherrod's Crew Chief
- Unknown as Prisoner with shank
- Unknown as Kwanese
- Unknown as Latonya

=== First appearances ===
- Rupert Bond: newly elected Maryland State's Attorney for Baltimore City who promotes Ilene Nathan to 2nd Deputy SA and Rhonda Pearlman to lead VCU prosecutions.
