= Reformation (The Wire) =

- The Wire episode
- Episode no.: Season 3 Episode 10
- Directed by: Christine Moore
- Story by: David Simon; Ed Burns
- Teleplay by: Ed Burns
- Original air date: November 28, 2004
- Running time: 58 minutes

Episode chronology
| ← Previous "Slapstick" | Next → "Middle Ground" |

"Reformation" is the tenth episode of the third season of the HBO original series The Wire. The episode was written by Ed Burns from a story by David Simon & Ed Burns and was directed by Christine Moore. It originally aired on November 28, 2004.

== Plot ==
Young Stanfield dealers Justin and Jamal hear gunfire and come across the body of LaTroy, a Stanfield lieutenant; they are picked up in a truck by Snoop and Tote. Meanwhile, Marlo and Partlow set up a night time ambush for Devonne, whom Marlo brutally shoots in the breasts and mouth. Partlow assures Marlo that the murder was necessary. As Holley works the murder scene of another Stanfield dealer, Fruit sees the body. At a safe house, Slim Charles tells Avon that two of Marlo's people have been killed. The resulting police crackdown affects Proposition Joe, Fat-Face Rick and Phil Boy.

Bell learns from Shamrock that they are running low on product and money. Bell meets with the Co-Op and is informed that they are pursuing a truce with Marlo and have voted to shut the Barksdales out if the turf war continues. Bell blames the impasse on Avon and his hubris. Avon nonetheless insists that the war will continue following Marlo's murder of Devonne. At his copy shop, Bell reluctantly phones the Western District police. Later, Bell finds that the development grants promised to him by Senator Davis have instead been awarded to another company. He gives Shamrock some documents to take to their lawyer, Maurice Levy.

In the Western, Colvin urges Carver to learn his beat and neighborhood so that he can protect them properly, drawing a distinction between the drug war and real policing. Mello informs Colvin that journalists have learned about Hamsterdam. While Herc and Truck are taking the reporter on a tour of the free zones, Colvin arrives and tries to spin a story about Hamsterdam being part of an enforcement strategy. The reporter agrees to hold the story for a week. Colvin discusses his options with Mello and his community relations sergeant, ultimately deciding to admit his involvement and face the consequences.

At the next ComStat meeting, Colvin gives a presentation explaining how Hamsterdam positively affected his district. Rawls realizes that Colvin has essentially legalized the drug trade in specific areas, leading Burrell to demand to see Colvin in his office. Colvin tells Burrell that he is willing to take the fall for the scheme, but threatens to lie about who sanctioned it if any of his subordinates are punished for his actions. Colvin further tells Burrell that a Baltimore Sun reporter is delaying a story on Hamsterdam. Burell threatens to fire Colvin outright. Later, Colvin tells McNulty that an informant has revealed the location of Avon's waterfront condo; he resists McNulty's attempts to find out more information about the informant, who is actually Bell.

Carcetti and D'Agostino chair a campaign strategy meeting in which it's agreed that African-American endorsements and staffers are needed. D'Agostino outlines the importance of keeping Gray in the race in order to split the black vote. Carcetti admits to his wife that he feels guilty about betraying Gray. She suggests that he tell Gray that he also plans to run, but Carcetti worries that this may drive Gray out of the race, indirectly undermining his own chances. Meanwhile, Burrell informs Mayor Royce and Parker about Colvin's actions. After Burrell tells Royce about the crime reduction and support for Colvin from the mayor's voting bloc, Royce contemplates how to use the information.

McNulty complains to Freamon that they are still not up on any wiretaps and are probably missing drug conspiracy phone calls. Daniels and Pearlman meet with Judge Phelan to discuss their difficulties with drug dealers discarding phones. Phelan offers to sign wiretap affidavits at any time as they uncover phone numbers. McNulty wants to rush the paperwork and is disappointed that Phelan is the assigned judge, still angry at his behavior during the first Barksdale investigation. Daniels points out that McNulty believes that anyone who gets in his way is worthless; McNulty concedes the point.

Freamon matches Bodie's voice to a prior recording of a phone call to his grandmother, which is used as probable cause for a wiretap. Over the wire, the Major Case Unit overhears Bodie ordering a resupply for a dealer known as Tweety Bird. McNulty meets up with Greggs and observes Bodie's meeting. Meanwhile, Daniels informs the rest of the unit that Prez's shooting is being investigated by internal affairs. Under Daniels' questioning, Freamon and Massey deny noticing any racist behavior from Prez. While waiting for Bodie's meeting, McNulty tells Greggs about his failed relationship with D'Agostino, complaining that she seemed to question his intelligence.

When the Barksdales ditch their phones, McNulty and Freamon propose that the unit supply new phones directly to Bernard. McNulty and Greggs visit Bubbles, who recognizes Squeak and agrees to talk to her. The next day, as Greggs and McNulty meet with Bubbles, McNulty thinks he spots Beadie Russell driving past; he chases the car, but the driver is not Beadie. Upon meeting Bubbles, Squeak arranges a meeting between Bernard and Freamon, who is posing as Bubbles' phone supplier. Freamon takes Bernard to a staged cell phone shop, where Massey poses as Freamon's niece and assistant. Bernard is taken in, but insists on doctored receipts as part of the deal.

Meanwhile, Brother Mouzone and his aide Lamar return to Baltimore and meet with Vinson, who gives him a description of Omar. Mouzone sends the homophobic Lamar into a gay bar (where he unwittingly encounters Rawls in one of them) to find him. Omar's boyfriend Dante notices Lamar's search and confronts him, only to be captured by Mouzone. Omar meets with Butchie to discuss the Barksdales' near-shooting of his grandmother. Butchie, disgusted that the Sunday truce was broken, tells Omar where their home base is located. Omar is outraged that Butchie has kept this information from him until now, but Butchie says that he was trying to protect him. Omar begins to stake out the Barksdales' funeral home and sees Bell leaving.

A visit from the Deacon prompts Cutty to visit Hamsterdam, where Carver suggests that he recruit disruptive kids from the time-out corner for his boxing gym. Cutty breaks up a fight involving Justin and Spider and teaches some boxing moves. Later, Justin and his friends visit the gym, mock the dilapidated equipment, and start an impromptu football game. Cutty, overwhelmed by the rowdiness, lashes out at Justin and the other boys, which in turn causes them to leave the gym. Cutty discusses his difficulty with the trainer of another gym, who encourages Cutty to remain patient and show the children that he has faith in them by not letting them fail. Cutty returns to Hamsterdam and apologizes to Justin. Later, Justin returns to the gym and finds Cutty training a young enthusiast.

== Production ==
=== Title reference ===
The title refers to the theme of season three with various characters struggling to initiate reform on a personal and citywide level. In this episode Cutty's attempts at personal reform come to fruition when he starts his gym, Colvin's attempt to reform the drug war are exposed and Brother Mouzone remarks on the empty political promises of reform in Baltimore marked by the collapse of the towers.

=== Epigraph ===
Call it a crisis of leadership.

— Proposition Joe

This phrase is originally said by Prop Joe regarding the Barksdale organization. However, the line may also allude to several 'leadership crises' present in the episode, including: Cutty learning how to coach kids, Colvin legalizing drugs without Commissioner Burrell's knowledge, Carcetti's dilemma over whether or not to betray Tony, and (of course) Avon refusing to back off his war with Marlo.

=== Credits ===
==== Starring cast ====
Although credited, Wendell Pierce and Jim True-Frost do not appear in this episode.

==== Guest stars ====
1. Glynn Turman as Mayor Clarence Royce
2. Peter Gerety as Judge Daniel Phelan
3. Jamie Hector as Marlo Stanfield
4. Chad L. Coleman as Dennis "Cutty" Wise
5. Brandy Burre as Theresa D'Agostino
6. Michael Potts as Brother Mouzone
7. Melvin Williams as The Deacon
8. Robert F. Chew as Proposition Joe
9. Richard Burton as Shamrock
10. Anwan Glover as Slim Charles
11. DeAndre McCullough as Lamar
12. S. Robert Morgan as Butchie
13. Gbenga Akinnagbe as Chris Partlow
14. Megan Anderson as Jen Carcetti
15. R. Emery Bright as Community Relations Sergeant
16. Norris Davis as Vinson
17. Jay Landsman as Lieutenant Dennis Mello
18. Sho "Swordsman" Brown as Phil Boy
19. Tony D. Head as Major Bobby Reed
20. Marty Lodge as Banisky - Baltimore Sun reporter
21. Felicia Pearson as Snoop
22. Cleo Reginald Pizana as Chief of Staff Coleman Parker
23. Mia Arnice Chambers as Squeak
24. Tiana Harris as Devonne
25. Melvin Jackson, Jr. as Bernard
26. Brian Anthony Wilson as Detective Vernon Holley
27. Troj. Marquis Strickland as Fat-Face Rick

==== Uncredited appearances ====
- Ernest Waddell as Dante
- Brandon Fobbs as Fruit
- Justin Burley as Justin
- Melvin T. Russell as Jamal
- Rico Sterling as Tyrell
- Joilet F. Harris as Officer Caroline Massey
- Ryan Sands as Officer Lloyd "Truck" Garrick
- Edward Green as Spider
- Marc Krinsky as Angelo Martin
- Raw Leiba as Stringer's Bodyguard
- Nakia Dillard as Lambert
- Unknown as Pete Sinopli
- Unknown as Tote
- Unknown as Barman in gay club
