= The Dickensian Aspect =

- The Wire episode
- Episode no.: Season 5 Episode 6
- Directed by: Seith Mann
- Story by: David Simon; Ed Burns
- Teleplay by: Ed Burns
- Original air date: February 10, 2008
- Running time: 58 minutes

Episode chronology
← Previous "React Quotes"	Next → "Took"

"The Dickensian Aspect" is the sixth episode of the fifth season of the HBO series The Wire. The episode was written by Ed Burns (from a story by David Simon and Ed Burns) and was directed by Seith Mann. It aired on February 10, 2008.

== Plot ==
If you have a problem with this, I understand completely.

— Freamon, in The Dickensian Aspect

As Marlo's crew searches in vain, an injured Omar hides himself in the same building where he was ambushed by Michael, O-Dog, Partlow, and Snoop. He threatens Fat Face Rick and takes his gun, which he uses to wound a Stanfield soldier before setting fire to one of Marlo's cash pickups. Marlo increases the bounty on Omar's head, suspends the meetings of the New Day Co-Op, and ups the wholesale drug price for its members. A wary Slim Charles declines Marlo's offer for control of the Baltimore County territories, which are instead given to Cheese. At the Baltimore Sun, Templeton's reporting on the "serial killer" gets national attention, leading editors Whiting and Klebanow to ask for a follow-up article. Templeton spends the night under the Jones Falls Expressway and interviews Terry, a homeless Iraq War veteran with PTSD. Gus is pleasantly surprised with the high quality of Templeton's piece, but remains skeptical of his reporting overall. He asks Templeton to pursue a report from Fletcher of a complaint on Templeton's story about a woman who died from seafood poisoning. When Templeton claims the complaint was false, Gus takes his word at face value, but remains suspicious.

McNulty realizes that Templeton made up a few details of his own about the killer. Bunk, still disgusted with McNulty's behavior, dives back into the old murder cases tied to Marlo's crew. He decides to interview Randy Wagstaff, who remains in his group home, but he refuses to cooperate. Greggs tells Bunk that an informant implicated Marlo's crew for her triple homicide. They learn that evidence from the vacant murders has become irrevocably jumbled due to human error. Bunk then investigates the killing of Bug's father and interviews Michael's mother. While there, she implies Chris and Snoop were the killers, leaving Bunk surprised. He is given a folder of stolen grand jury indictments found in Proposition Joe's shop. Meanwhile, Mayor Carcetti hosts a ribbon-cutting ceremony for portside condos while being heckled by ex-dockworkers, including Nick Sobotka. Later, Carcetti gives a passionate press conference vowing to protect the homeless from the "serial killer." Wilson and Steinhorf suggest that running on defending the homeless may be Carcetti's key to getting elected governor. Daniels hands the stolen indictments to Pearlman and Bond, who realize there is a leak in the courthouse. Bond also makes clear that he will be handling the Clay Davis trial alone (with the implication being that he wants to ensure that the spotlight shines solely on himself), and that he wants to remove some witnesses from the trial list.

Judge Daniel Phelan declines McNulty and Pearlman's request for a wiretap on the Sun's phones. Freamon reveals his illegal wiretap of Marlo to Sydnor, who agrees to help. He determines that Marlo is sending photos, but a new wiretap authorization is needed to see what is being sent. McNulty finds that, with police now arriving on the scene immediately whenever a homeless person turns up dead, he is unable to stage more serial murders. He comes across a mentally ill homeless man named Larry and, with Freamon's help, photographs him with the "killer"'s trademark ribbon, after which Larry will never be seen again; the killer, according to the cover story, will now only send photos of his victims to the press, and their bodies will not be found. McNulty gives Larry $100 and drives him down to a homeless shelter in Richmond, Virginia, giving him a stolen ID card. As he leaves, he feels a pang of guilt over what he has done to Larry.

== Production ==
=== Guest stars ===
- Peter Gerety as Judge Daniel Phelan
- Pablo Schreiber as Nick Sobotka
- Maestro Harrell as Randy Wagstaff
- Felicia Pearson as Felicia "Snoop" Pearson
- Anwan Glover as Slim Charles
- Method Man as Melvin "Cheese" Wagstaff
- Delaney Williams as Jay Landsman
- William Joseph Brookes as Lawrence Butler
- Shamika Cotton as Raylene Lee
- Brian Anthony Wilson as Vernon Holley
- Michael Willis as Andy Krawczyk
- David Costabile as Thomas Klebanow
- Sam Freed as James Whiting
- Nancy Grace as Herself
- Dion Graham as Rupert Bond
- Sho "Swordsman" Brown as Phil Boy
- Christopher J. Clanton as Savino Bratton
- Kwame Patterson as Monk Metcalf
- Troj Marquis Strickland as Ricardo "Fat-Face Rick" Hendrix
- Robert Poletick as Steven Luxenberg
- Scott Shane as Scott Shane
- Brandon Young as Mike Fletcher
- William F. Zorzi as Bill Zorzi
- Luray Cooper as Nat Coxson
- Aubrey Deeker as Terry Hanning (credited as Aubrey Daniels)
- Roscoe Orman as Oscar Requer
- Richard Pelzman as Little Big Roy
- Dionne Audain as Social Worker
- Dave Ettlin as Dave Ettlin
- Crissandra Spencer as Crissandra Spencer
- Ken Ulman as Reporter Ken Ullman
- Russ Widdall as Ron Lowenthal
- Neerja Sharma as Woman Monk interviews
- Edet B. Isuk as Stanfield soldier (shot by Omar)
- Jeffrey Wendell Moffatt as Stanfield muscle
- Rashiela Daniels as Unknown
- Reginald Gilmer as Unknown
- Carlos J. Gonzalez as Unknown

==== Uncredited appearances ====
- Mike D. Anderson as Ghost
- Megan Anderson as Jen Carcetti
- Donald Neal as Jay Spry
- Ed Norris as Ed Norris
- Unknown as Larry

== In popular culture ==
- Emcee Noesis from Philadelphia Slick references the episode in his song "Meet the Press".
