= Refugees (The Wire) =

- The Wire episode
- Episode no.: Season 4 Episode 4
- Directed by: Jim McKay
- Story by: Ed Burns; Dennis Lehane
- Teleplay by: Dennis Lehane
- Original air date: October 1, 2006
- Running time: 58 minutes

Episode chronology
← Previous "Home Rooms"	Next → "Alliances"

"Refugees" is the fourth episode of the fourth season of the HBO original series The Wire. Written by Dennis Lehane from a story by Ed Burns & Dennis Lehane, and directed by Jim McKay, it originally aired on October 1, 2006.

== Plot ==
Mayor Royce meets with Parker, who thinks that campaign posters with Pan-African flag colors can help him shore up Baltimore's black vote, though Royce mocks the idea as tacky. Royce organizes a poker game to raise money for his campaign; among his opponents is Krawczyk. After some discussion with his staff, Carcetti meets with the interdenominational ministerial alliance. Knowing his chances, Carcetti does not outright ask for support, but promises his ear to them anyway, should he be elected. Watkins watches Marla in a debate with her opponent, Eunetta Perkins, and is outraged when he sees that Royce has broken his promise and put Perkins on his ticket instead of Marla.

Greggs joins Freamon in Homicide, and learns that Landsman shares her disdain for new Major Crimes Units (MCU) head Marimow. She sees Bunk interview a witness who identifies Lex as the killer of Fruit. Elsewhere, Colonel Raymond Foerster meets with Burrell and Rawls to discuss the murder of the state's witness. Royce has asked Burrell to slow the investigation so that no proof that the motive was the victim's upcoming testimony will emerge before the election. Burrell orders Foerster to assign the case to Greggs because of her rookie status. Foerster reluctantly complies. The detectives discuss Marimow's destruction of the MCU, whereupon Bunk calls Marimow the "unit killer" due to his effect on the MCU. Bunk and Freamon serve a warrant on Lex's home, where they find that his grieving mother has set up a shrine to her son. While drinking with Bunk, Freamon theorizes that Marlo has not been linked to any murders because he is hiding corpses in an unknown location.

After losing money in a poker game, Marlo has Partlow pick him up from a grocery store. Inside, he brazenly steals a lollipop in front of the security guard. When the guard confronts Marlo, he replies that the guard's presence meant nothing to him. At Vinson's rim shop, Old Face Andre informs Marlo about Omar's robbery of his store. When Andre tries to get out of a debt, Marlo demands that he hand over his diamond ring as collateral and tells him to pay what he owes. Marlo sends Partlow and Snoop to track and kill the guard. They also visit Bodie, who reluctantly agrees to sell for Marlo. Stanfield soldier O-Dog gives Bodie a package of drugs and the terms of his business relationship with Marlo. After tracking down Michael to his house, Partlow and Snoop hide the guard's body in a boarded up rowhouse.

Proposition Joe tries to convince Marlo to join the New Day Co-Op and aid their planned war with the New York drug dealers intruding into East Baltimore. Marlo, unconcerned because his territory is on the West Side, declines Joe's offers of protection and ends the meeting. At Butchie's bar, Joe meets with Omar and assures him that he had nothing to do with Stringer Bell's scheme turning Omar against Brother Mouzone. To make amends, Joe offers information on Marlo's card game, asking for a quarter of the take. Omar finds the opportunity to his liking and robs the game while Marlo is playing, taking Andre's ring and the money. When Marlo tells Omar that this is not the end of their dealings, Omar warns him that he can find Marlo's people with less effort than Marlo's people will need to find Omar. Marlo, handing over the ring, replies, "Wear it in health."

Marimow watches Sydnor and Massey as they turn off the wiretap. Dozerman and Herc report to the MCU, and are lectured by Marimow about how they will be operating. Meanwhile, Bubbles berates Sherrod for missing school and warns him that not attending classes could mean the end of their business partnership. The two meet with Donnelly to discuss Sherrod's poor attendance. Later, Bubbles watches the illiterate Sherrod pretend to read books from school. Sherrod takes out an algebra book and a French dictionary, claiming one to be a workbook that goes with the other. Bubbles isn't fooled but says nothing about the ruse.

Dukie, Randy, Namond and Michael spend time at Cutty's gym and discuss the box cutter incident. When Spider fails to show up for a training session, Cutty again offers to train Michael. The Deacon offers Cutty a janitor position at the boys' middle school. Sherrod joins Prez's class. When Prez tries to get his students to open up about the box cutter incident, Namond and other students instead impertinently interrupt and ask about his career as a police officer. Randy and Sherrod both use the disruption to leave the class; Randy is caught selling candy in the sixth grade cafeteria. When Randy is brought before Donnelly, she demands that he tell her who is responsible for a spate of graffiti at the school. Instead of a custodial position, Cutty finds himself being interviewed to work as an unofficial truant officer. He learns that the school rounds up truants to meet minimum attendance figures it needs to secure extra funding, rather than to ensure they are educated.

Colvin and Parenti meet with the school superintendent, Mrs. Conway, who agrees to fund their in-school program after being assured that the scheme will not bring bad publicity to the school board. At the school, Colvin and Parenti sign confidentiality agreements and safety waivers. Colvin meets with the eighth grade teacher Grace Sampson, who says that many teachers view the scheme as an unwelcome intrusion from City Hall. Colvin observes the students, seeing variation in how well classes perform with the best behavior in the younger grades. While the boys head home, they learn that someone "snitched" and got a student suspended over the graffiti. Prez learns that Chiquan will be scarred from the box cutter attack. Michael starts Bug on his homework and heads to Cutty's gym. There, Michael agrees to attend a boxing match with Cutty and Justin. Afterwards, Michael avoids Cutty's attempts at conversation and refuses a lift to his house.

== Production ==
Richard De Angelis makes his final appearance as CID Colonel Raymond Foerster.

The dialogue between Marlo and the security guard (specifically the "You want it to be one way" section) was sampled in Little Brother's 2007 album Getback on the song "Sirens".

=== Title reference ===
The episode title refers to the detectives fleeing the major crimes unit. It also refers to Bodie being on his own in the streets after the fall of the Barksdale organization.

=== Epigraph ===
No one wins. One side just loses more slowly.

— Prez

Prez says this to his wife, referring to the game of football he is watching. This quote is almost certainly a reference to the 1975 film Night Moves, in which the protagonist says virtually exactly the same thing to his wife when she asks him who is winning a televised football game: "Nobody, one side is just losing slower than the other."

=== Credits ===
==== Starring cast ====
Although credited, Lance Reddick, Deirdre Lovejoy, and Seth Gilliam do not appear in this episode. This is the first episode of the series not to feature Reddick. Since Reddick was the only actor in every episode prior to this, from this point on, nobody has appeared in every episode.

==== Guest stars ====
1. Richard De Angelis as Colonel Raymond Foerster
2. Jermaine Crawford as Duquan "Dukie" Weems
3. Maestro Harrell as Randy Wagstaff
4. Julito McCullum as Namond Brice
5. Tristan Wilds as Michael Lee
6. Gbenga Akkinagbe as Chris Partlow
7. Robert F. Chew as Proposition Joe
8. Tootsie Duvall as Assistant Principal Marcia Donnelly
9. Dravon James as Mrs. Grace Sampson
10. Melvin Williams as The Deacon
11. Maria Broom as Marla Daniels
12. Brandy Burre as Theresa D'Agostino
13. Karen Vicks as Gerry
14. Alfonso Christian Lover as Old Face Andre
15. S. Robert Morgan as Butchie
16. Felicia Pearson as Snoop
17. Phillip Burgess as Security Guard
18. Justin Burley as Justin
19. Rashad Orange as Sherrod
20. Boris McGiver as Lieutenant Charles Marimow
21. Rick Otto as Detective Kenneth Dozerman
22. Delaney Williams as Sergeant Jay Landsman
23. Shamika Cotton as Raylene Lee
24. David Fonteno as Poker winner
25. Sheila Gaskins as Mrs. Anderson
26. Richard Hildebird as Claudell Withers
27. Dan DeLuca as Dr. David Parenti
28. Della Ford as Unknown
29. Cleo Reginald Pizana as Chief of Staff Coleman Parker
30. Lora Reed as Unknown
31. Tyreeka Freamon as School Receptionist
32. Alan V. Poulson as Developer
33. Frederick Strother as State Delegate Odell Watkins
34. Gregory L. Williams as Detective Crutchfield
35. Michael Willis as Andy Krawczyk

==== Uncredited appearances ====
- Kwame Patterson as Monk Metcalf
- Joilet F. Harris as Officer Caroline Massey
- Darrell M. Smith as School Officer Turner
- Atif Lanier as Western District Officer
- Jonnie Louis Brown as Officer Eddie Walker
- Nicole Pettis as Miss Reese - sixth grade English teacher
- Sheila Cutchlow as Miss Sheperdson - education bureaucrat
- Destiny Jackson-Evans as Crystal Judkins
- Jeffrey Lorenzo as Karim Williams
- Davone Cooper as Darnell Tyson
- Jason Wharton as Albert Stokes
- Rakiya Orange as Charlene Young
- James Lewis as Marvin - Truant Officer
- Steve Staiger as Property Developer
- Dave Cooperman as High Roller
- Joanna Becker as High Roller
- Paul Fahrenkopf as High Roller
- Brian Ross Huse as High Roller
- Darrell Britt-Gibson as O-Dog
- Tyrell Baker as Little Kevin
- Keenon Brice as Bug
- Seth Hurwitz as Poker player
- Mark Joy as Ed Bowers - Property Developer
- Tony Bailey as Charles
- Unknown as Eunetta Perkins
- Unknown as Marcus - young fighter
- Unknown as Cashier
- Stephanie Burden as Mrs. Pryzbylewski
- Unknown as Kwanese
- Unknown as Superintendent Conway

== Reception ==
In Collider, Matt Goldberg describes season 4 of The Wire as "subtle, powerful, compassionate, and heartbreaking" while noting that "the show's reach finally exceeded its grasp in terms of drama".
