= Misgivings =

- The Wire episode
- Episode no.: Season 4 Episode 10
- Directed by: Ernest Dickerson
- Story by: Ed Burns; Eric Overmyer
- Teleplay by: Eric Overmyer
- Original air date: November 19, 2006
- Running time: 58 minutes

Episode chronology
← Previous "Know Your Place"	Next → "A New Day"

"Misgivings" is the tenth episode of the fourth season of the HBO original series The Wire. Written by Eric Overmyer from a story by Ed Burns & Overmyer, and directed by Ernest Dickerson, it originally aired on November 19, 2006.

== Plot ==
=== Politics ===
Senator Clay Davis meets with Commissioner Ervin Burrell and tries to reassure him that he is safe from Tommy Carcetti's plans to unseat him now that Carcetti has won the election and has already put de facto Deputy Commissioner William Rawls in charge of his position. Davis believes that Burrell's race is his trump card, and knows he has got the City Council President's, Nerese Campbell, as well as the Ministers' support, but urges him to impress the mayor with police work. Burrell is at a loss for how to act on this suggestion.

Davis later meets with Carcetti and Norman Wilson. He brings up Burrell's precarious position and Wilson reveals that they hope that his supporters will be swayed if they attract a better candidate. Davis speculates that they will need assistance getting the pay raise they need approved and offers to provide this for a future favor. Wilson sees through Davis's intentions and recognizes a further con, but is uncertain what his plan is.

Davis next convenes a meeting between City Council President Nerese Campbell and Ervin Burrell. Davis and Burrell attempt to convince her that Cedric Daniels is an unsuitable candidate for Commissioner. Davis asks Campbell to withhold the full pay raise the mayor is requesting, so that Burrell will have time to impress him and defame Daniels. Davis asks Campbell to provide half of what the mayor has asked and then immediately leaves the room to call Carcetti's staff and advise that he has the salary bump he asked for.

=== Western District ===
Donut cruises the Western District in a stolen car until he is spotted by Officer Walker. Donut tries to drive off and hits several cars as he veers around the streets. He manages to escape when Walker collides with another vehicle. Walker later tracks Donut down to his customary hangout and finds him with Kenard. Donut attempts to run, but Walker's retribution for his earlier embarrassment is swift and brutal; he catches Donut and breaks several of his fingers. Donut tells Namond and Kenard about his injuries as they work on their corner.

Sergeant Carver makes an efficient raid on the corner and arrests Namond when he finds narcotics. Namond is unable to contact his mother, who is out of town, and Carver explains that he will have to spend the night in juvenile booking. Namond is terrified at this prospect, because juvenile booking is on the East Side, which is out of Namond's comfort zone, and Carver begins to show some sympathy. He finally allows Namond to sleep on a bench in the office.

Lieutenant Mello hosts the roll call briefing. He asks for progress on a recent spate of church burglaries. Officer McNulty suggests that he liaise with Officer Baker as they are investigating two separate burglaries. Mello introduces the idea of making arrests for quality of life violations so the arrest statistics will improve and tells his men that the order comes straight from the Commissioner. Officers such as McNulty and Santangelo are against the idea of arresting people for open container violations. Mello agrees, but insists that they need to do so anyway.

Officer Anthony Colicchio takes to the new orders with relish outside of a local bar with other officers. Officer McNulty appears ready for backup, but refuses to participate in the ticketing process. McNulty sarcastically notices Officer Baker's "first class police work" in ticketing a car. When Baker explains he is following orders, McNulty states that as patrolmen, they are entitled to the "one true dictatorship" in America: choosing how to spend their shift. He then shows the paperwork suggesting to Baker that his time would be better spent on the church burglaries. He explains a pattern that he has noticed in the incident reports and Baker agrees to follow up on the lead with him. As they are talking, a riot is brewing that Baker fears is getting out of hand. McNulty tells him the situation will lead to more arrests, which is exactly what the department wants.

Carver tells Namond he must find somewhere else to stay. He begs Carver to call his teacher, Mr. Colvin. Colvin suggests sending Namond to juvenile booking, but agrees to call his wife to check if Namond can stay with them.

At the Colvin household, Namond is polite and charming. Namond catches Colvin's nickname ("Bunny") and Colvin intimidates him into not mentioning it. Colvin returns Namond to his mother the following day. Namond introduces Colvin as his teacher, intentionally not mentioning he is an ex-police. She rebukes his kindness and berates Namond for being afraid to go to juvenile booking.

At the end of the shift McNulty and Baker bring in a pair of suspects. The desk sergeant initially tells them to send the suspects in line with all the other detainees, until hearing that they are responsible for the church burglaries. The sergeant is then relieved that some "real criminals" are actually left in Baltimore, as the police station is filled with people arrested for minor infractions.

McNulty later goes to dinner with Bunk Moreland and their sons. Elena McNulty arrives to pick up the boys and is impressed to find that they have done their homework. She becomes more impressed when McNulty turns down a drink. She expresses regret at their marriage ending now that McNulty is finally growing up.

Mello takes his concerns about the new strategy to Cedric Daniels, reluctant to execute the arrest hikes ordered to them by Commissioner Burrell. After hearing that neighborhood people are being locked up in what appears to be an unnecessary arrest hike to serve Burrell, Daniels agrees that it is just more of the same from command. Daniels talks with Mayor Carcetti and presents the information as indicative of Commissioner Burrell's new initiative to influence arrest stats. Carcetti is outraged, as this is the opposite of his hopes for the police department. He questions Daniels' reasons for bypassing Deputy Commissioner Rawls and Daniels explains that it is a test of Carcetti's commitment to change in the police department. He explains that if Rawls had already told Carcetti about Burrell's actions and Carcetti had not acted, then he would know that Carcetti was not committed. Daniels, however, believes Rawls has not reported it to Carcetti and is either content with Burrell's strategy or waiting for Carcetti to fire Burrell due to insubordination. Carcetti reminds Daniels that he already has his word and then thanks him for going outside the chain of command. Daniels warns him that he will not make a habit of it.

=== Stanfield Organization ===
Bodie Broadus and Poot Carr discuss the change in the weather and remark that they are getting old. Little Kevin returns after several days' absence and explains that he was taken in by the police for questioning about the murder of Lex. He is urged to go straight to Marlo Stanfield and explain what happened so that there is no doubt about his actions. Little Kevin does as they suggest and faces hostility from Marlo and Chris when they learn that instead of organizing a meeting with Lex himself, he passed the task on to Randy Wagstaff. Marlo nods to Monk, and as Little Kevin is told to leave they bundle him into the back of an SUV. Chris asks Marlo about Randy and he states that Randy is in no position to hurt them. Snoop reminds Marlo that Randy is likely an informant and he suggests that they spread the rumor around. As Kevin is being driven away, Slim Charles arrives. Omar Little and Renaldo observe Marlo as he conducts his operation from the courtyard. Omar recognizes Slim Charles from his time with the Barksdale Organization and remarks that the association does not add up.

Michael points out Bug's father to Snoop and Chris when he is buying drugs for Michael's mother. Snoop asks Michael why he wants him killed, but he declines to explain further. Chris agrees to do as Michael asks.

Slim visits Poot and Bodie and welcomes Poot home. Slim asks how Bodie is getting along with Marlo. Slim tells Bodie that Marlo has had Kevin killed. Omar tails Slim back to his home and the monotony of the task begins to annoy Renaldo. Bodie and Poot discuss Marlo's actions. Bodie is angry that Marlo killed Little Kevin without proof that he was working with the police. Poot draws a parallel between Marlo's order to kill Little Kevin and Stringer Bell's order to kill Wallace. Bodie argues that Stringer's order was justified in that Wallace was working with the police. On concluding that Marlo is more ruthless than Stringer, Poot tells Bodie that while the world is getting hotter the people are becoming colder.

Chris and Snoop intercept Bug's father, Devar, on his way home from the store. When Chris questions him about his sexuality, the man gets defensive and replies that he's living with a woman at the present time. Chris presses the point, making reference to inappropriate contact with kids, as well as getting him to admit to having had homosexual relations in prison. Devar acknowledges this fact. Chris, in a rage, brutally beats and kicks the man to death before spitting on his corpse. A stunned Snoop looks on, remarking on the fact that Chris did not first bring the man into a vacant house before killing him, which goes against their regular procedure. Later, Michael happily observes his mother sitting by herself at home, knowing that Bug's father won't be coming back.

=== School ===
Roland "Prez" Pryzbylewski mentions the sudden increase in the temperature of his room to his colleague Grace Sampson. Sampson explains that at this time of year the school switches to longer classes for exam preparation, and that increasing the temperature makes the kids drowsy and less disruptive.

In the special class Miss Duquette coordinates a roleplaying exercise with Kwame and Darnell Tyson pretending to be at a restaurant. Mr. Colvin and Dr. David Parenti are called away by Assistant Principal Marcia Donnelly. She has bad news: despite the class being especially aimed at socializing disruptive students, they still have to follow the school board's missive that they teach to the upcoming test. She also informs them that the assistant superintendent has requested a meeting with them.

At the meeting, Parenti and Colvin discuss the pupils' recent visit to a restaurant with Miss Sheperdson, the assistant superintendent. She is insistent that they will teach the test. Parenti is enraged that Sheperdson is undermining the program's efforts even though they had clearly stated their aims at the outset. Colvin tries to explain the futility of insisting that the children in their class be treated like every other student. Sheperdson is skeptical about excluding these children from standard practices.

The following day, Prez is observed by Sheperdson as he teaches test questions to uninterested students. But as soon as she leaves, Prez has the class return to his normal lesson plan: teaching "probabilities" using dice games, and the class eagerly responds. Randy Wagstaff faces bullying in the corridors as rumors of his snitching spreads, and he gets the cold shoulder from his friend Karim Williams in class when looking for a partner to roll dice with. However, Michael offers to partner with him.

Sheperdson observes the special class with Principal Claudell Withers. A fight breaks out between Zenobia and Chandra as the class performs another roleplaying exercise. Miss Mason is knocked over in the ensuing brawl. Sheperdson is dismayed, which is compounded when Withers admits that this is the first time he has observed the class.

Sheperdson discusses the program with the teachers afterwards. Sheperdson's cynicism is obvious. Donnelly gives her support and Colvin, Duquette and Parenti are passionate about continuing. Mason, however, is not optimistic about the prospect of the program having any long-lasting positive effect on the student participants.

=== Major Crimes ===
Thomas "Herc" Hauk visits Bubbles and tries to enlist his help in retrieving the missing camera. Bubbles is outraged that Herc is asking him for more favors when Herc has broken his promises. Bubbles again asks for help with the drug addict who has been robbing him and Herc makes another promise to help. Herc provides Bubbles with a phone and some money and instructs him to call as soon as he sees his tormentor.

Herc discusses his problem about the missing camera with Officer Kenneth Dozerman and Detective Leander Sydnor. Sydnor urges Herc to go straight to the lieutenant before the situation gets worse. Herc is worried about Lieutenant Marimow's reaction.

Herc tries to confess to Marimow and is faced with hostility. Bubbles spots his antagonist and attempts to call Herc during the meeting, but Herc ignores his calls. Marimow threatens Herc with an internal investigations division case and Herc is intimidated into withholding the information about the camera.

Bubbles becomes frustrated with Herc and decides to get revenge. He calls up Herc about a fictitious drug resupply in progress, giving Herc the license plate of a minister's car. Herc jumps on the opportunity and organizes a traffic stop. Herc is aggressive towards the minister, throwing the minister's possessions on the sidewalk as he searches his car.

== Production ==
=== Title reference ===
The title refers to the feelings held by various characters in the episode. Marlo's misgiving about Little Kevin led to his murder. Bodie worries about the appropriateness of his new boss's actions. Doubts spread about Randy's character lead to bullying at school. Miss Sheperdson has misgivings about the appropriateness of the special class while many teachers feel the same way about her insistence upon teaching test questions. Michael makes an uneasy decision about Bug's father. Marimow and Bubbles doubt Herc's integrity. Burrell worries about his job security while Daniels doubts the effectiveness of his new strategy. Wilson and Carcetti worry about trusting Davis. Bubbles also deliberately gives Herc misinformation about a drug bust.

=== Epigraph ===
World goin' one way, people another.

— Poot

Poot uses this phrase to explain the increasingly cold and ruthless nature of the drug trade against the backdrop of global warming. There is also the connotation of the opposing forces at work in many of the characters.

=== Credits ===
==== Starring cast ====
Although credited John Doman, Deirdre Lovejoy, Clarke Peters, Sonja Sohn, Chad L. Coleman and Glynn Turman do not appear in this episode.

==== Guest stars ====
- Callie Thorne as Elena McNulty
- Isiah Whitlock, Jr. as Senator Clayton "Clay" Davis
- Jermaine Crawford as Duquan "Dukie" Weems
- Maestro Harrell as Randy Wagstaff
- Julito McCullum as Namond Brice
- Tristan Wilds as Michael Lee
- Gbenga Akkinagbe as Chris Partlow
- Anwan Glover as Slim Charles
- Jonnie Louis Brown as Officer Eddie Walker
- Tray Chaney as Malik "Poot" Carr
- Nathan Corbett as Donut
- Davone Cooper as Darnell Tyson
- Thuliso Dingwall as Kenard
- Taylor King as Zenobia Dawson
- Shamika Cotton as Raylene Lee
- Cyrus Farmer as Devar Manigault
- Sandi McCree as De'Londa Brice
- Dawn Ursula as Lolita Colvin
- Marlyne Afflack as Nerese Campbell
- Stacie Davis as Miss Duquette
- Dan DeLuca as Dr. David Parenti
- Tootsie Duvall as Assistant Principal Marcia Donnelly
- Dravon James as Mrs. Grace Sampson
- Sheila Cutchlow as Miss Sheperdson
- Richard Hildebird as Principal Claudell Withers
- Jay Landsman as Lieutenant Dennis Mello
- Ramón Rodríguez as Renaldo
- Franklin Ojeda Smith as Reverend
- Tyrell Baker as Little Kevin
- Michael Coley as Kwame
- Na'Dria Jennings as Chandra Porter
- Felicia Pearson as Felicia "Snoop" Pearson
- Katherine Schmoke as Miss Mason
- Benjamin Busch as Officer Anthony Colicchio
- Derek Horton as Officer Brian Baker
- Boris McGiver as Lieutenant Charles Marimow
- Rick Otto as Officer Kenneth Dozerman
- Michael Salconi as Officer Michael Santangelo

==== Uncredited appearances ====
- Destiny Jackson-Evans as Crystal Judkins
- Jeffrey Lorenzo as Karim Williams
- Jason Wharton as Albert Stokes
- Keenon Brice as Bug
- Kwame Patterson as Monk Metcalf
- Eric G. Ryan as Sean McNulty
- Antonio Cordova as Michael McNulty
- Unknown as Tote
