= Transitions (The Wire) =

- The Wire episode
- Episode no.: Season 5 Episode 4
- Directed by: Dan Attias
- Story by: David Simon; Ed Burns
- Teleplay by: Ed Burns
- Original air date: January 27, 2008
- Running time: 58 minutes

Episode chronology
← Previous "Not for Attribution"	Next → "React Quotes"

"Transitions" is the fourth episode of the fifth season of the HBO original series The Wire. The episode was written by Ed Burns from a story by David Simon & Ed Burns and was directed by Dan Attias, who won the Directors Guild of America Award for Outstanding Directing – Drama Series for the episode. It first aired on January 27, 2008.

== Plot ==
Buyer's market out there.

— Templeton

=== Western District ===
At Michael's corner, Kenard places a brown paper bag under a step. Officer Anthony Colicchio and his partner observe the scene from their patrol car nearby and decide to move in. Colicchio puts his hand in the bag expecting to find drugs, instead finding dog excrement. As a furious Colicchio puts the crew into a transport van, a queue of traffic develops. One driver inflames Colicchio's anger by requesting that they move the cars, causing Colicchio to assault him. Sergeant Ellis Carver helps restrain Colicchio.

The following day, Carver informs Colicchio that the incident is being looked into by Internal Affairs. When Colicchio shows no remorse over his actions, Carver decides that he will charge Colicchio himself. Later, Carver meets with his old partner Herc, who tries to argue Colicchio's case and insists that Carver cannot turn against his own men despite his closeness to making rank. Reminding Herc of their past experience with Randy Wagstaff, Carver explains that everything they do matters. Herc warns Carver that he will face a bad reputation, but encourages him to do the right thing.

=== City Hall ===
Sydnor and Freamon uncover explicit fraud in Senator Davis' accounts. Freamon and Pearlman meet with Bond, who is hesitant to make the case federal. Speaking alone with Pearlman, Bond believes that with a ten-year penalty for each of the four lesser counts of theft, a conviction on local charges will be sufficient. Davis visits the courthouse for a secret grand jury hearing, where he denounces the enquiry and refuses to answer further questions. As he leaves the courthouse, Davis denies wrongdoing to a throng of reporters. Freamon realizes that Bond leaked the hearing to the press in order to raise his own profile.

Daniels meets with Commissioner Burrell and denies any role in Burrell's firing, offering to decline his planned promotion; Burrell simply gives him the silent treatment. Mayor Carcetti holds a meeting in his office with his senior staff and is forced to make concessions to the ministers to smooth Daniels' transition to commissioner. During a meeting with Campbell, Burrell reveals that the FBI previously investigated Daniels and will expose Daniels if forced to resign. Campbell warns Burrell and promises a lucrative job if he leaves quietly. She urges Carcetti to secure her job offer to Burrell, arguing that it is necessary to ensure that Burrell does not damage the reputation of his former subordinates.

Prior to the press conference announcing Burrell's departure, Burrell bitterly warns Rawls to expect more of the same treatment as acting commissioner. At the press conference, Daniels again tries to reassure Burrell that he did not ask for the promotion. Burrell reminds Daniels that he once called his bluff about exposing his past and claims that he no longer remembers the details of the FBI file, effectively exonerating Daniels.

=== The Sun ===
At The Baltimore Sun, Templeton tells Alma that he is being interviewed for a junior position at The Washington Post. During his interview, Templeton is surprised to see a senior Post editor commending the Sun‘s journalism. Upon departing from the Post office, Templeton has second thoughts on leaving the Sun.

From a source, Alma learns about Burrell's rumored departure, which others on the Sun's metro team are unable to confirm. Gus is worried that they will not have enough to run their story, but outgoing police reporter Roger Twigg places one last call to a police department source – Stan Valchek – to confirm the rumor. Gus expresses disappointment that Twigg's departure, along with other cutbacks, will cut them off from the department sources. Alma replaces Twigg as senior police reporter. Cutbacks are also blamed when the Sun misses the story of Davis' grand jury hearing.

=== Homicide ===
McNulty visits the medical examiner's office and researches the locations where unclaimed homeless deaths have occurred, seeing that an overwhelming number of bodies are found in the Southern District at night. McNulty calls Freamon to advise him of the findings and they learn Freamon's old patrol partner, Oscar Requer, is listed on the night shift. The detectives ask him to notify them of any male homeless deaths in the district. Requer immediately agrees to help them with no further questions asked, surprising McNulty. Freamon explains that Requer also suffered under the authority of Rawls.

Bunk Moreland is upset that Landsman is ignoring his reports, angrily asserting that he is forced to repeat his requests while waiting for the crime lab to process evidence on 14 of the 22 vacant murder scenes. As Bunk leaves Landsman's office, McNulty facetiously shows him that he is working on finding links between the homeless murders.

Later, through a 2-way mirror, Greggs watches Devonne, the child from the home invasion, with a psychiatrist. Devonne is extremely withdrawn and does not engage with toys or the psychiatrists. Greggs calls her ex-partner Cheryl and asks to see her son Elijah. After an awkward introduction, Greggs and Elijah begin to bond.

McNulty and Freamon canvass an area where the homeless gather at night to better verify their office reports and insulate themselves. After a tip from Requer, McNulty arrives at a crime scene and fakes another strangulation to fit with the pattern he has established. Freamon assists McNulty in reframing the crime scene.

McNulty returns home and tries to cover his drinking with mouthwash. Beadie Russell awakes and questions his whereabouts earlier. She reminds him of the strength of their relationship and tells him not to return if he doesn't want to be there.

=== Omar Little ===
Omar returns to Baltimore and visits the home of Big Guy, Butchie's ailing former bodyguard. He identifies Chris Partlow and Snoop as responsible. Omar vows to avenge Butchie. Butchie's friend Donnie insists upon accompanying Omar as he is more familiar with the Stanfield Organization.

Omar waits for Slim Charles to return to his apartment to violently interrogate him for Proposition Joe's location. Slim asks Omar to consider why Joe would have given up Butchie when he was aware it would bring Omar's vengeance upon him, and claims that he would help Omar if Joe had given up Butchie. Omar leaves without further violence.

Omar and Donnie observe Marlo Stanfield's courtyard from a vacant building. They discuss Stanfield's awareness of their intentions and Omar plans to attack Stanfield's people until Stanfield is forced to confront them himself. Donnie points out Monk as Stanfield's lieutenant and Omar agrees to target him.

=== New Day Co-Op ===
Prop Joe and Slim Charles make funeral arrangements for Butchie, while discussing Marlo Stanfield’s responsibility for his murder. Slim Charles worries that the flowers and card will not deter Omar Little from seeking revenge. Prop Joe believes his nephew Melvin "Cheese" Wagstaff is involved but tells Slim Charles that he will not act without confirmation. Joe plans to go into hiding, leaving Cheese in charge and have Slim Charles keep an eye on Cheese.

Stanfield meets with drug trafficker Spiros Vondas to usurp their business relationship with Prop Joe. Stanfield reminds Vondas that Prop Joe was robbed by Omar, suggesting that having contact with him would act as an insurance policy against future robberies for all parties. The Greek reveals himself and tells Stanfield that they will accept his offer of insurance as they live in volatile times and cannot predict the future. After Stanfield leaves, Vondas remarks that Stanfield is not Prop Joe and The Greek agrees.

Prop Joe chairs a meeting of the New Day Co-Op, where a feud occurs between Cheese and fellow dealer Hungry Man. After Joe reprimands Cheese, Joe reassures Hungry Man that Cheese will respect the agreed boundaries and adjourns the meeting. Cheese storms out of the room while Stanfield watches. After the meeting, Prop Joe asks Stanfield to focus on working with others and Stanfield thanks him for his advice. Later that night, Partlow takes Cheese to an abandoned building, where Snoop guards a bound and distressed Hungry Man. Partlow tells Cheese that it is a gift from Stanfield.

Cheese helps Prop Joe to prepare to leave town. After Cheese leaves, Stanfield enters. Realizing he was betrayed, Prop Joe attempts to reason with Stanfield, who dismisses the gesture. Stanfield tells Joe to close his eyes before Partlow fires a single shot into the back of Joe's head.

=== First appearances ===
- Oscar Requer: Freamon's former partner in the patrol division and an ex-homicide detective. Requer was kicked out of Homicide after pulling rank over an Area Chief at the scene of a murder. It is subsequently revealed that the Area Chief was William Rawls, who retaliated by transferring Oscar to the midnight shift in the Southern District. A retired homicide detective with the same surname provided inspiration for the character of Bunk Moreland on the show.

== Production ==
=== Guest stars ===
- Frankie Faison as Ervin Burrell
- Amy Ryan as Beatrice "Beadie" Russell
- Paul Ben-Victor as Spiros "Vondas" Vondopoulos
- Robert F. Chew as Proposition Joe
- Bill Raymond as The Greek
- Delaney Williams as Jay Landsman
- Marlyne Afflack as Nerese Campbell
- Benjamin Busch as Anthony Colicchio
- Anwan Glover as Slim Charles
- Felicia Pearson as Felicia "Snoop" Pearson
- Method Man as Melvin "Cheese" Wagstaff
- Duane Chandler Rawlings as Hungry Man
- Dion Graham as Rupert Bond
- Melanie Nicholls-King as Cheryl
- Frederick Strother as Odell Watkins
- David Costabile as Thomas Klebanow
- Shamika Cotton as Raylene Lee
- Sam Freed as James Whiting
- Bobby Brown as Bobby Brown
- Ed Norris as Ed Norris
- Roscoe Orman as Oscar Requer
- Michael Salconi as Michael Santangelo
- Bruce Kirkpatrick as Roger Twigg
- Donald Neal as Jay Spry
- Todd Scofield as Jeff Price
- William F. Zorzi as Bill Zorzi
- Jeffrey Pratt Gordon as Johnny "Fifty" Spamanto
- Curtis L. McClarin as Florist
- Jeff Roberts as Homeless Employed Man
- Ptolemy Slocum as Homeless Business Card Man
- John Badila as Sun Staff Member
- Valerie Leonard as Washington Post Editor
- Jayne Miller as TV news journalist
- Jerry B. Whiddon as Washington Post Editor
- Miriam Hyman as Social Worker
- Nathan James as Western DEU Officer
- Tim R. McAdams as Motorist
- Joey Perillo as Medical Examiner
- Alan J. Wendl as Southern District Desk Sergeant
- Larry Andrews as Donnie
- Sho "Swordsman" Brown as Phil Boy
- Thuliso Dingall as Kenard
- Edward Green as Spider
- Derrick Purvey as Big Guy
- Troj Marquis Strickland as Ricardo "Fat-Face Rick" Hendrix

==== Uncredited appearances ====
- Mike D. Anderson as Ghost
- Thomas J. McCarthy as Tim Phelps
- Kwame Patterson as Monk Metcalf
- Brandon Young as Mike Fletcher
