= Slapstick (The Wire) =

- The Wire episode
- Episode no.: Season 3 Episode 9
- Directed by: Alex Zakrzewski
- Story by: David Simon; George Pelecanos
- Teleplay by: David Simon
- Original air date: November 21, 2004
- Running time: 58 minutes

Episode chronology
← Previous "Moral Midgetry"	Next → "Reformation"

"Slapstick" is the ninth episode of the third season of the HBO original series The Wire. The episode was written by David Simon from a story by David Simon and George Pelecanos and was directed by Alex Zakrzewski. It originally aired on November 21, 2004.

== Plot ==
Daniels and Pearlman discuss the legal requirements for the Major Crimes Unit's wiretaps on the Barksdales' disposable phones. Greggs and McNulty outfit Bubbles with a wire and give him enough money to force Bodie's crew to phone in for a resupply for drugs.

While out picking up food, McNulty and Prez are alerted to shots fired on their radio. They split up and move towards the sound of the gunfire; McNulty finds Prez standing over what turns out to be a dead plainclothes police officer, Waggoner. Rawls notes that there is a racial component to the shooting because Waggoner was an African-American who was shot by a white officer.

As Cutty cleans out the building he plans to convert into a community boxing gym, he struggles with bureaucratic red tape.

The Deacon meets with Colvin, who tells him he is retiring and willing to let others decide whether to sustain Hamsterdam. After a body is found inside Hamsterdam, Carver persuades the officers to move the body elsewhere. Herc refuses and tips off The Baltimore Sun about Hamsterdam. After Crutchfield gives Colvin an ultimatum, he meets with the crew chiefs and threatens to close Hamsterdam if they do not turn in the shooter. The crew chiefs turn in the shooter.

Gray – unaware that Carcetti is also planning a mayoral run – offers him a place on his ticket as council president. Carcetti and Gray meet with Watkins to discuss their proposed witness protection scheme. Carcetti charms Watkins and convinces him to offer funds in order to persuade Royce to start the initiative.

Omar arrives at his grandmother's house. Barksdale soldiers are staking out the house who are wary of breaking the longstanding Sunday morning truce. After being given permission by Bell, Sapper and Gerard open fire on Omar and his grandmother, but both survive the attack. Slim Charles chastises his men for violating the truce.

Bernard and Squeak rent a car to buy more disposable phones, unwittingly being followed by Sydnor. Bernard delivers the phones to Shamrock. Joe meets with Vinson to organize a meeting to pursue a truce, offering Marlo a chance to join the Co-Op and keep all of his territory. Vinson explains that Marlo believes Avon is weak and wants to take over the West Side.

Bell meets with Davis, angry that he is still facing bureaucratic obstructions despite bribing the senator. Davis urges Bell to show patience and leave the street mentality behind, but Bell will not be mollified. Meanwhile, Avon meets with Brianna, who tells him about McNulty's suspicions that D'Angelo was murdered. Avon tries to convince her that McNulty was lying, while Bell – who ordered D'Angelo's death – sits calmly throughout the meeting. Brianna begs Avon for assurance that he knew that he could trust D'Angelo; Avon bristles at Brianna's implication. Elsewhere, Omar, outraged at the attack on his grandmother, tells Dante and Kimmy that he is taking on the Barksdales alone.

== Production ==
=== Title reference ===
The title is an ironic reference to the slapstick manner in which many of the very serious events (all of which could have been avoided) in the episode play out: Prez's tragic misfire; the breaking of the Sunday morning truce by Barksdale soldiers culminating almost comically in the shooting off of Omar's grandmother's church 'crown' before an awkward escape; Carver's decision to move the body out of the free zone, which is easily picked up on by homicide; Herc's and other Western District detectives' growing disenchantment with Colvin's initiative.

=== Epigraph ===
...while you're waiting for moments that never come.

— Freamon

Spoken while Freamon tries to persuade McNulty to see that there is more to life than casework. The camera pans over to the refrigerator covered with pictures of members (past and present) of the detail, settling on the picture of Beadie Russell. The line comes from the famous lyrics by John Lennon, "Life is what happens to you while you're busy making other plans."

=== Context ===
Producer George Pelecanos has previously published a novel, Right as Rain, dealing with the fallout after a white police officer shoots an undercover black police officer. Much of Prez's situation is drawn from that novel, including several direct lines of dialogue.

=== Non-fiction elements ===
McNulty makes reference to several real-life Baltimore police officers when saying the few people who have as good of a position as the detail, including co-creator Ed Burns.

=== Credits ===
==== Starring cast ====
Although credited, Frankie R. Faison and Wendell Pierce do not appear in this episode.

==== Guest stars ====
1. Isiah Whitlock, Jr. as Clay Davis
2. Chad L. Coleman as Dennis "Cutty" Wise
3. Michael Hyatt as Brianna Barksdale
4. Brandy Burre as Theresa D'Agostino
5. Delaney Williams as Sergeant Jay Landsman
6. Robert F. Chew as Proposition Joe
7. Melvin Williams as The Deacon
8. Ryan Sands as Officer Lloyd "Truck" Garrick
9. Brian Anthony Wilson as Detective Vernon Holley
10. Richard Burton as Sean "Shamrock" McGinty
11. Anwan Glover as Slim Charles
12. Ernest Waddell as Dante
