= Margin of Error (The Wire) =

- The Wire episode
- Episode no.: Season 4 Episode 6
- Directed by: Dan Attias
- Story by: Ed Burns; Eric Overmyer
- Teleplay by: Eric Overmyer
- Original air date: October 15, 2006
- Running time: 58 minutes

Episode chronology
| ← Previous "Alliances" | Next → "Unto Others" |

"Margin of Error" is the sixth episode of the fourth season of the HBO original series The Wire. Written by Eric Overmyer from a story by Ed Burns & Eric Overmyer, and directed by Dan Attias, it originally aired on October 15, 2006.

== Plot summary ==
=== Democratic Primary Campaign ===
On Sunday morning, Mayor Royce and Councilmen Gray and Carcetti attend church to win support from the ministers as the election approaches. Later, while Carcetti and Wilson are campaigning downtown, State Delegate Watkins shows a flier linking Carcetti to a notorious slumlord. Wilson recognizes the flier as a last-minute smear tactic by Royce, but Carcetti becomes agitated that the attack might work. Carcetti, Wilson, D'Agostino, and Gerry discuss how to respond to the flier. At Wilson's urging, Carcetti appears on several radio talk shows, which helps to get his mind off Royce's campaign flyer. Senator Davis offers to hold off his usual election-day support of Royce in exchange for $20,000. Carcetti reluctantly agrees.

At home that evening, the Carcetti, Royce, and Gray households watch news reports of massive voter turnout, Carcetti being in the lead, and Bond beating Demper in the State's Attorney race (indicating a lack of support for Royce's ticket). Jen convinces Tommy to go for a walk with her. He gets a call from D'Agostino to tell him that Royce has conceded, making him the presumptive mayor-elect, because Baltimore is such a heavily Democratic city. Tommy is unsure whether he is happy about the win, but finally breaks into a smile. They make their way to a celebration and Tommy thanks his supporters and opponents, both for their help in the forthcoming general election and in improving Baltimore. Council President-elect Naresse Campbell congratulates Carcetti. Jen tells him that she is going home and that he should enjoy his night. Davis also attends the party and is unashamed of his actions of supporting Royce anyway, telling Carcetti he let him off lightly.

The party continues with Gerry, Wilson, Tommy, and D'Agostino in a downtown hotel. After Gerry leaves with Wilson, D'Agostino comes on to Carcetti, but he eventually rejects her sexual advances.

=== Western District ===
Sydnor and Herc watch as Marlo meets with his lieutenants. Marlo makes a phone call about picking up a "skinny girl from New York," which Herc interprets as an arrangement to pick up a supply of cocaine. Herc follows Marlo to Penn Station and has him arrested when he meets a woman who turns out not to be carrying drugs - Marlo has engineered the incident to draw out the police. Meanwhile, Greggs learns that a prisoner has offered information on the dead state's witness. However, Rawls tells Landsman to detail Greggs and Norris to uniformed duty at the polls, stalling the witness case until after the election. At school, Prez offers to help Dukie get clean clothes. Donnelly and Grace remove Namond from regular class and put him in Colvin and Parenti's study program along with nine other students. When Donnelly threatens Randy with expulsion over a potential sexual assault case, he reveals that he knows about a murder. Prez appeals to her to let him hand Randy's confession on to someone that he trusts in the police.

In the Western District, a murder warrant is issued for Omar for the shooting of the delivery woman. McNulty is skeptical that Omar would kill someone not involved in the drug trade. Prez appeals to Daniels to help prevent Randy from getting chewed up by the system. Daniels suggests Prez go to Carver, who has reformed his approach to police work. Carver meets with Randy's foster mother, who worries about the boy's safety should anyone learn that he has spoken to the police. She is disappointed in Randy's bad judgment, but Carver tells her he thinks Randy is a good kid. On Election Day, while accompanying his foster mother to the polls, Randy is paid by a Carcetti staffer to pass out leaflets. Randy recruits Dukie, Kenard and Donut to help him, completing the job by himself after the others take advantage of the staffer's up front payment. Meanwhile, Brianna cuts Namond and his mother De'Londa loose, partly because her income from the collapsed Barksdale Organization has run out. At home, De'Londa pressures Namond to bring in money by selling drugs and takes him to see Bodie. Bodie is initially unsure, but De'Londa persists and uses Wee-Bey's name to convince him. After De'Londa leaves, Bodie tells Namond that talking to her gives him insight into his personality.

Michael goes to the gym where Cutty is already flirting with another woman. Namond arrives and asks Michael for help moving his first package and Michael refuses. Cutty talks to Michael about the woman and then asks about Spider. Michael explains that Spider quit because of Cutty's involvement with his mother, then makes a cutting remark about Cutty being no "angel". When Namond returns home he tells De'Londa that his new corner duties were easy to carry out, but he later dumps a full bag of drugs on his bed, indicating that he has not sold any of his package.

=== Omar ===
Officer Walker spots Omar in a convenience store. Omar realizes Walker is waiting outside for him and hides his gun in a refrigerator. Walker stops Omar and, as he waits for backup, pockets a ring Omar is wearing — the same ring that Omar took from Marlo during his robbery of Marlo's poker game. When Omar claims that there is no charge against him, Walker informs him that he is facing a murder charge. Colicchio and McNulty arrive on the scene, and Omar asks McNulty for a phone call before he is taken in. McNulty gives him his own personal cell phone, and he dials Butchie for him. Butchie reassures Omar that he will pay his bail and offers him support, even when Omar tells him there will be no bail because the charge is murder. Santangelo playfully mocks McNulty as being a "Democrat" for aiding Omar.

When Omar is brought into the prison, he is faced with aggression from most of the other inmates, many of whom he has robbed in the past. Omar prepares for the worst when two men are sent into his cell, one of them carrying a knife. After a tense stand-off, Omar is immensely relieved as they reveal that Butchie sent them to protect him.

== Production ==
=== Title reference ===
The title refers to the results of a poll on voting intentions for the mayoral primary featured in the series. In statistical analysis, the margin of error expresses the amount of the random variation underlying a survey's results. This can be thought of as a measure of the variation one would see in reported percentages if the same poll were taken multiple times. The larger the margin of error, the less confidence one has that the poll's reported percentages are close to the "true" percentages; that is, the percentages in the whole population.

=== Epigraph ===
Don't try this shit at home.

— Norman Wilson

This is made in reference of Norman chiding Carcetti for trying to handle the vote turnout of the primary election on his own. This also is in reference of Sergeant Hauk trying to lead an improper investigation on Marlo with the use of a camera obtained through improper protocol, as well as Namond becoming further immersed in the drug game.

=== Credits ===
==== Starring cast ====
Although credited, Frankie Faison, Deirdre Lovejoy, Clarke Peters, Wendell Pierce, and Andre Royo do not appear in this episode.

==== Guest stars ====
- Isiah Whitlock, Jr. as Senator R. Clayton "Clay" Davis
- Jermaine Crawford as Duquan "Dukie" Weems
- Maestro Harrell as Randy Wagstaff
- Julito McCullum as Namond Brice
- Tristan Wilds as Michael Lee
- Gbenga Akinnagbe as Chris Partlow
- Hassan Johnson as Roland "Wee-Bey" Brice
- Megan Anderson as Jen Carcetti
- Tootsie Duvall as Assistant Principal Marcia Donnelly
- Michael Hyatt as Brianna Barksdale
- Jay Landsman as Lieutenant Dennis Mello
- Ed Norris as Detective Ed Norris
- Delaney Williams as Sergeant Jay Landsman
- Marlyne Afflack as Naresse Campbell
- Brandy Burre as Theresa D'Agostino
- Dravon James as Mrs. Grace Sampson
- Karen Vicks as Gerry
- Christopher Mann as Councilman Anthony Gray
- Frederick Strother as State Delegate Odell Watkins
- Felix Stevenson as Reverend Frank Reid
- Melvin Williams as The Deacon
- Tevin Brown as Unknown
- Nathan Corbett as Donut
- Thuliso Dingwall as Kenard
- Denise Hart as Miss Anna Jeffries
- Sandi McCree as De'Londa Brice
- Jonnie Louis Brown as Officer Eddie Walker
- Benjamin Busch as Officer Anthony Colicchio
- Michael Salconi as Officer Michael Santangelo
- Corbin Smith as Monell
- Brian Anthony Wilson as Detective Vernon Holley
- Queen Nzinga Ama Linton as female rail passenger
- Isis McCray as Girl who was taken into the bathroom
- Felicia Pearson as Snoop
- Jack Seeley as Bigoted voter
- Gregory L. Williams as Detective Michael Crutchfield

==== Uncredited appearances ====
- S. Robert Morgan as Butchie (voice only)
- Darrell M. Smith as School Officer Turner
- Diana Villamonte as Mrs. Rachel Shapiro – eighth grade teacher
- Demetria Bailey as Mrs. Perlene Scott – eighth grade teacher
- Jeffrey Lorenzo as Karim Williams
- Taylor King as Zenobia Dawson
- Davone Cooper as Darnell Tyson
- Jason Wharton as Albert Stokes
- Michael Coley as Kwame
- Na'Dria Jennings as Chandra Porter
- Edward Green as Spider
- Tyrell Baker as Little Kevin
- Donnie Andrews as Donnie
- Derrick Purvey as Big Guy
- Corbin Smith as Monell
- Tony Ruggieri as Amtrak Police Supervisor
- Susan Lynskey as lip reader in van
- Unknown as Ms. Hanson - older African American veteran eighth grade teacher
- Unknown as Tiff
- Unknown as Paul
- Unknown as Markeith
- Unknown as Latonya
- Dan DeLuca as Dr. David Parenti
