= Stanfield Organization =

Fictional criminal organization from The Wire

- The Wire organization
- Founded: 2004
- Location: Baltimore, Maryland, United States
- Leader: Marlo Stanfield and Chris Partlow
- Purpose: Drug trafficking, conspiracy, money laundering, and murder
- Affiliations: New Day Co-Op and The Greeks
- Enemies: Barksdale Organization, New York-based drug trafficking organizations and Omar's crew

On the fictional television drama The Wire, the Stanfield Organization is a criminal organization led by Marlo Stanfield. The Organization is introduced in Season Three of The Wire as a growing and significantly violent drug syndicate. Marlo has established his organization's power in West Baltimore's main streets in the shadow of the dominating Barksdale Organization, which was more concerned with conducting its activities in the Franklin Terrace Towers.

The Stanfield Organization violently clashes with the Barksdale crew after the latter is forced to move on from the demolished Franklin Terrace Towers and tries to reclaim the streets the gang once dominated. Marlo's is the only crew in the area not to let itself be absorbed into the feared Barksdale gang, and a violent turf war breaks out. The Stanfield Organization begins as the underdog, but fallout from the strain of the war combined with internal strife among the Barksdale Organization leadership, the organization's ongoing war with stickup man Omar Little and a successful investigation by the Major Crimes Unit manages to destroy the Barksdale Organization at the end of Season Three.

By Season Four, Marlo's crew becomes the most powerful drug organization in West Baltimore, and forms an alliance with the New Day Co-Op while ruling its streets through fear. In Season Five, after a period of aggressive expansion which culminates in Marlo seizing control of the Co-Op, a series of arrests and deaths destroy the organization.

The Stanfield Organization is the most violent and ruthless of the street-level drug trade organizations portrayed in The Wire.

== Leadership ==
The Stanfield Organization

=== Marlo Stanfield ===
Stanfield is a rising gang leader who gets into a turf war with the Barksdale Organization, becoming the key West Baltimore drug kingpin following Stringer Bell's death and Avon Barksdale's arrest. Stanfield is played by Jamie Hector.

=== Chris Partlow ===
Partlow is Marlo Stanfield's second-in-command in his drug dealing operation. He is played by Gbenga Akinnagbe.

=== Monk Metcalf ===
Monk is a lieutenant in the Stanfield organization, and the third most recognized leader of the Stanfield Organization.

== Soldiers ==
=== Savino Bratton ===
- Played by: Chris Clanton
- Appears in:

Season one: "The Target" (uncredited); "The Detail" (uncredited); "Lessons" (uncredited); "Game Day"; "The Cost" and "The Hunt".
Season five: "More with Less" (uncredited), "The Dickensian Aspect" and "Took".

Savino is one of five prominent enforcers of the Barksdale Organization in Season 1. He is shown as a cocky, but loyal soldier to his crew, evident by his lack of reluctance to take the fall for one of the organization's mishaps with the police and spend time in prison. Savino was not as involved in the more delicate violent operations of the organization compared to fellow soldiers Marquis "Bird" Hilton and Anton "Stinkum" Artis, but was still important enough to conduct business under his chief enforcer, Roland "Wee-Bey" Brice.

Savino was one of the members present during D'Angelo Barksdale's court case to intimidate anyone in the courtroom looking to cause complications or trouble. Savino was notably the only upper-tier member of the Barksdale Organization not actively targeted by Omar Little, as he was not directly involved in the murder of Omar's boyfriend Brandon Wright. However, he was soon caught up in the covert investigation into the crew by the Major Crimes Unit when he was involved in the shooting of Detective Greggs and Orlando.

After the Barksdale crew realizes Orlando was cooperating with the police, Savino met with Orlando and Greggs— who posed as Orlando's girlfriend —and together they drove to a secluded location for a drug buy. Savino left the car, ostensibly to pick up Orlando's drugs, allowing enforcers Wee-Bey Brice and Little Man to reveal themselves and shoot into the car. Before the shooting, Savino tried to signal them about Greggs' unplanned presence, only intending to kill the turncoat Orlando, but the darkness made them unable to see him and they followed through with the plan, killing Orlando and severely wounding Greggs.

Afterward, warrants were written for Savino, the only person involved in the shooting known to the police beforehand, and he turned himself in after an unproductive manhunt. Barksdale attorney Maurice Levy argued that Savino was merely intending to defraud Orlando—selling him baking soda instead of cocaine— and was unconnected to the shooting, forcing the District Attorney to charge him with distributing false narcotics, which only carries a maximum three-year prison sentence. When the police try to convince him to turn evidence on the Barksdale crew, Savino cockily says "I can do the three. Ain't no thing."

By Season 5, Savino is one of remaining Barksdale survivors alive and not imprisoned; by this time his three-year sentence was up and he was released from prison, soon operating as a soldier in the Stanfield Organization. Savino involved himself in the Stanfield crew's hunt for Omar after the latter returned for the death of Butchie and narrowly escaped an ambush attempt by Chris Partlow, Snoop, O-Dog and Michael Lee.

Savino's activities were soon recognized and he was eventually ambushed in a corner by Omar Little, who after a brief conversation, killed Savino with a single gunshot to the head, in revenge for the torture-murder of Butchie by Chris Partlow and Snoop. Omar identified him as a past Barksdale soldier and, knowing his violent history, refused to accept Savino's explanation that he was not present at the incident, reasoning that if Savino had been there he would have joined in with the others.

After Omar's own death, the police found his "hit-list" and discover all the upper-tier members of the Stanfield Organization he planned to kill. Savino's name was the only one crossed out, which means he was ultimately the only major casualty of Omar's gang war, and ironically the last casualty of his past hatred of the Barksdale Organization.

=== Melvin "Cheese" Wagstaff ===
Cheese is the nephew of Proposition Joe and a crew chief in his Eastside drug crew. He joins Marlo for a short time before Marlo's retirement. He then briefly takes over the Stanfield Organization with Slim Charles, until Charles kills him as revenge for previously helping to take down Proposition Joe. He is played by actor/musician Method Man from the Wu-Tang Clan. He is also the father of student character Randy Wagstaff. The show never depicts the actual relationship. Randy Wagstaff is the character who ends up in group homes after his house is burned down as a result of his perceived cooperation with law enforcement.

=== Felicia "Snoop" Pearson ===
- Played by: Felicia Pearson

One of the chief enforcers in the Stanfield Organization, along with Chris Partlow.

=== Michael Lee ===
Michael Lee is a soft-spoken middle school pupil who gets taken under the wing of Stanfield and Partlow in season four and trained as a soldier. Michael is played by Tristan Wilds. He also serves as a de facto guardian for his half-brother Bug. It is strongly implied that he was abused by his stepfather Devar (Bug's father). By the end of the series, with the Stanfield Organization dissolved, Michael's actions parallel those of Omar Little, as he goes into hiding, stays independent of any other dealers, and emerges only to rob those involved in the drug trade with a shotgun.

=== O-Dog ===
- Played by: Darrell Britt-Gibson
- Appears in

Season four: "Refugees" (uncredited); "Corner Boys;" "That's Got His Own" (uncredited) and "Final Grades."
Season five: "More With Less" (uncredited), "Unconfirmed Reports", "React Quotes", "Late Editions"

O-Dog, real name Darius Hill, is a teenage soldier who is being trained to kill by Snoop Pearson in the fourth season. He is one of two prominent soldiers to arise from the second generation of Stanfield street recruits, the other being Michael Lee. O-Dog is depicted as a silent character, he identifies closer with Snoop than Michael and consequently develops into a colder, more reckless soldier. This is in stark contrast to Michael, who seems to adopt Chris's lethal but cautious attitude.

O-Dog is first seen delivering a package to Bodie, and throughout the season he guards Marlo and accompanies Snoop and Chris as extra muscle. He is one of the soldiers responsible for subduing Little Kevin and sending him to his death. He is also seen hanging out with Michael Lee when Monk Metcalf shoots Dennis "Cutty" Wise, showing little empathy for Cutty.

Along with Chris and Snoop, he is responsible for the execution of Bodie at the end of season 4. O-Dog exits a vacant and fires a shot to Bodie's head while he focuses on defending himself from Chris and Snoop, and fires another shot to the head once Bodie is down, earning him the nods of respect from Chris and Snoop.

His status within the organization makes him one of nine active targets listed on Omar's hitlist. When Marlo orders a hit on a rival dealer's corner, O-Dog suggests a drive-by which fails. In an ambush on Omar Little and Donnie at Monk's apartment, O-Dog is shot in the leg by Omar. He is consequently relegated to the sidelines and is chosen by Chris and Snoop to take responsibility for their gun charges. When the leadership of the organization are detained in custody, O-Dog is shown regrouping with Snoop and Michael at the latter's apartment. He is last seen here with Snoop, Dukie and Michael watching mayor Carcetti comment on Marlo Stanfield's arrest, wondering if he still has to take responsibility for the gun charges.

== Dealers ==
=== Bodie Broadus ===
Bodie was a dealer who came of age working for Avon Barksdale. After the Barksdale organization dissolves, he is briefly independent (supplied by the New Day Co-Op) until Marlo forces him to join his crew. He is shot and killed by O-Dog, after Monk sees Bodie having a conversation with McNulty, because Marlo suspects he may be a snitch.

=== Poot Carr ===
Poot is a loyal drug dealer for the Barksdale organization, who serves brief prison time for his crimes. By the end of the series he is working at a shoe store attempting to distance himself from the game after growing tired of it and reeling from the loss of many friends.

=== Namond Brice ===
Namond is the Son of Barksdale Main Soldier Wee-Bey Brice and works for Bodie who has problems with Namond but doesn't mention anything out of respect for his father. Later, he works for Marlo after Bodie is forced to join Marlo and his gang. Howard "Bunny" Colvin later persuades Wee-Bey that although Namond may act tough, he is really not cut out for the corners and that he has a lot of potential academically. Colvin adopts Namond, who is later seen to be excelling, having left the streets behind.

=== Duquan "Dukie" Weems ===
Duquan is a friend of Michael and Namond. He lives in extreme poverty and often smells, and is frequently teased by many of the boys in the "Fayette Street Mafia". In season 4, his teacher "Mr. Prezbo" takes him under his wing, giving him clean clothes and food. In Mr. Prezbo's class Duquan is happy and thriving, and becomes the class computer expert. At the end of season 4, Duquan is "socially promoted" to high school due to his age.

Rather than face the violence and intimidation of high school life, Duquan turns to the streets, where he starts slinging dope. He works for Michael in Season 5 for a short time due to not getting respect from Michael's crew. He later becomes Michael's brother's babysitter and eventually a drug addict. Duquan's character shows the realistic struggle and a sink or swim lifestyle of inner city youth living in poverty and violence. Duquan is one of the show's most tragic characters. The tragedy is the loss of support for intelligent kind natured children who find it difficult to find a place in society.

Duquan excels when given clean clothes, food and a computer. However, since all these resources were provided by Mr. Prezbo, Duquan must leave these resources and is forced back into the streets. The tragedy turns grimmer as Duquan loses all social support because he is too young to be employed, but too old to stay with Mr. Prezbo. Duquan, after finding no place in the violent or illegal world, wanders into the lost world of the street addict.

The last scene shows him injecting drugs in a horse stable used by his friend. This scene is quite disturbing to the viewer who sees Duquan's character slowly lose path. With the right support Duquan could have excelled as a student, but his meek, kindly nature ultimately leads to his own demise. He also wears a light blue shirt with bubbles, indicating Bubbles being succeeded by Dukie as a tragic addict.

=== Fruit ===
- Played by: Brandon Fobbs
- Appears in:

Season three: "Time after Time"; "All Due Respect"; "Dead Soldiers"; "Hamsterdam"; "Homecoming"; "Reformation" and "Mission Accomplished".
Season four: "Boys of Summer".

Fruit is a prominent crew chief of one of Marlo Stanfield's drug dealing crews, and works closely with Jamal and Justin. Fruit is identifiable by his ever-present Kangol hat, and is the chief for one of West Baltimore's most prominent street corners. He is first seen negotiating with Dennis "Cutty" Wise over how to distribute a package of dope; he seems to be fair, but he later rips Cutty off, saying the package was taken by the police. Cutty protests, but Fruit pulls a gun on him and forces Cutty to withdraw.

Later in the season, his crew's territory is encroached upon by Bodie Broadus and his crew, which sparks the turf war with the Barksdale organization. Fruit is pressured by Marlo to force the Barksdale Organization away, and Fruit responds by gathering his muscle and beating most of the crew with baseball bats. Cutty, now working for the Barksdale organization, takes part in the subsequent retaliation strike against Fruit's corner. Slim Charles kills one of Fruit's dealers, but Fruit escapes death because Cutty is unable to bring himself to kill again.

In "Boys of Summer", the season four premiere, Fruit is seen leaving an afterhours nightspot with a woman, Patrice. As he is walking through the parking lot, he is killed by a single gunshot to the head by Lex, the father of Patrice's child. Lex shows little regret for his actions, only replying with "Sup Patrice?" Fruit's death causes Marlo to order an immediate retaliation hit on his killer, Lex.

=== Jamal ===
- Played by: Melvin T. Russell
- Appears in

Season three: "Time after Time"; "All Due Respect"; "Dead Soldiers"; "Reformation" and "Mission Accomplished".
Season four: "Unto Others" (uncredited)

Jamal is a young drug dealer in Fruit's crew. He is often seen with Justin. Jamal took part in the beating of Puddin as part of a turf war between Stanfield and the Barksdale organization. His role in the beating earned him the respect of Fruit. Justin and Jamal later discovered the body of Stanfield drug dealer LaTroy and the two fled the streets in fear of their own safety. He is later seen ridiculing Cutty as he approaches Spider on the corner.

=== Justin ===
- Played by: Justin Burley
- Appears in:

Season three: "Time after Time" (uncredited); "Hamsterdam" (uncredited); "Reformation" (uncredited); "Middle Ground" and "Mission Accomplished".
Season four: "Soft Eyes"; "Refugees"; "Unto Others" (uncredited).

Justin is a young drug dealer in Fruit's crew. He is identifiable by his baseball cap, which he wears sideways (which was the subject of a brief conversation with Thomas "Herc" Hauk and Ellis Carver). He discovered the body of Stanfield drug dealer LaTroy with his colleague Jamal and the two fled the streets in fear of their own safety. Toward the end of season three, he gets involved with Dennis "Cutty" Wise and his boxing gym.

At first, he resists Cutty's attempts to teach and instill discipline, but he eventually settles down and is seen sparring with (and losing to) a smaller boxer from another gym. In season 4, Justin continues to attend Cutty's gym and train as a boxer. As the gym grows, Justin develops a superior attitude to more casual users of the equipment. He provokes a fight with Michael Lee over use of the heavy bag when he is preparing for a fight but Cutty calmly breaks the pair up. Justin became more accepting of Michael over time and the two attended a professional boxing match along with Cutty. It can be assumed as he is no longer seen, that Justin was saved from the streets by Cutty's efforts.

=== Boo ===
- Played by: Esley Tate
- Appears in: Time After Time; Homecoming

Boo is a minor corner boy, he normally works on Fruit's corner and he is later shot to death by Slim Charles in a drive-by.

=== Kenard ===
Kenard is a younger member of Namond Brice's circle of friends (also known as the Fayette Street Mafia). He is first seen in season three, where, following a prolonged gunfight at a Barksdale stashhouse, Kenard argues with his friends over which one gets to pretend to be Omar Little while playing in the area and re-enacting the gunfight.

In season four, he is frequently seen hanging out with the Fayette Street Mafia, usually making fun of Duquan "Dukie" Weems. He works with Donut and Randy Wagstaff delivering flyers on election day. He also works with Namond, Donut and Byron selling drugs. Despite being the youngest of his friends he is consistently the most profane. Namond makes him his lieutenant and allows him to store their package of narcotics. After attempting to steal from Namond, Kenard is savagely beaten by Michael. However, in the Season 4 finale, Kenard is seen working on Michael's new corner with Dukie.

Kenard approached Roland "Prez" Pryzbylewski, who was watching Dukie from afar, for a drug purchase. While working on Michael's corner in season 5, Kenard and company are held at gunpoint by Omar who is on a mission to terrorize Marlo Stanfield's corners in an attempt to lure him into the streets. Kenard is underwhelmed at the sight of Omar due to him being on a crutch because of an injury from a shootout with some of Stanfield's enforcers, including Michael. While in an alley with some friends, dousing a cat with lighter fluid, and apparently planning to light the cat, Kenard sees Omar approaching.

The rest of his friends run while Kenard remains and then proceeds to trail Omar as he robs a Stanfield corner. He follows Omar into a Korean owned grocery store and shoots him in the head, instantly killing him. In fear, he drops the gun and flees. In the series finale, Kenard is shown during the closing montage, being led away by Detective Crutchfield, the detective in charge of investigating Omar's murder.

=== Little Kevin ===
- Played by: Tyrell Baker
- Appears in:

Season one: "The Target" (uncredited)
Season three: "Time after Time" (uncredited); "Hamsterdam" (uncredited); "Reformation" (uncredited); "Middle Ground" and "Mission Accomplished".
Season four: "Boys of Summer"; "Soft Eyes"; "Refugees"; "Unto Others" (uncredited), "Know Your Place", "Misgivings".

Little Kevin is a teenage drug dealer working for Bodie Broadus in season four. Kevin's nickname is a play on his weight; he is in fact the most obese drug dealer in their crew. He first appears telling Randy Wagstaff to send fellow drug dealer Lex to meet a girl, where Chris Partlow and Snoop are waiting for him. They then murder Lex. After Randy tells Detective Thomas "Herc" Hauk this, Herc and Dozerman brought everyone in Bodie's crew under 5'6" and 150 lbs, not realizing the nickname was ironic.

When Kevin's identity is confirmed, he is sent to Central Booking after refusing to cooperate in Herc's interrogation. Upon telling Bodie about his brief arrest and being hit with a charge of giving a false statement, Bodie and Poot tell him to tell Marlo Stanfield so as to convince him that he wasn't informing the police. When Kevin tells Marlo that he had used Randy as go-between in Lex's murder, Marlo has Kevin killed. Slim Charles who witnesses the event informs Bodie of what has happened, increasing Bodie's animosity to Marlo. While Bodie is unaware that Little Kevin betrayed Lex in an earlier episode, he is still livid because he strongly feels that Marlo killed Little Kevin "just because he could".

=== Spider ===
- Played by: Edward Green
- Appears in:

Season three: "Hamsterdam" (uncredited); "Homecoming" (uncredited); "Middle Ground;" and "Mission Accomplished."
Season four: "Margin of Error" (uncredited).
Season five: "More with Less", "Not for Attribution", "Transitions", "React Quotes" (uncredited), "Took", "Late Editions", and "–30–."

Spider is a teenage drug dealer working for Bodie Broadus in season three. He also boxes at Dennis "Cutty" Wise's community gym. He is first seen at Howard "Bunny" Colvin's disastrous meeting with young drug dealers to convince them to move to his tolerant zones. Bodie later puts him to work in "Hamsterdam". He is one of the dealers robbed in the house jewellery set-up.

Along with Justin he is singled out for fighting by Ellis Carver who introduces him to Cutty. Spider befriends Justin and becomes a regular user of the gym by season four. Cutty alienates Spider when he sleeps with his mother and shortly afterwards, Spider returns to the corner. When Cutty attempts to persuade Spider to get off the corner, he responds that Cutty is not his father.

He is then seen in the same crew as Sherrod and later with Bodie's crew. When a contract is out on Bodie Spider is the first to flee not wanting to get killed. After Bodie is murdered by one of Stanfield's crew members at the end of season 4, Spider is seen working under Michael Lee at the beginning of season 5. He beats up Duquan "Dukie" Weems in "React Quotes" after Dukie knocks down Kenard who provokes him. Spider is last seen in the season 5 series ending montage as the new crew chief of Bodie's and Michael's former corner. Spider's ending signifies the beginning of a new generation of drug lords and renewed cycle of the drug trade.

== Fronts ==
=== Vinson ===
- Played by: Norris Davis
- Appears in

Season three: "All Due Respect"; "Homecoming"; "Slapstick"; "Reformation" and "Mission Accomplished".
Season five: "React Quotes"; and "–30–".

Vinson was a mentor to Marlo Stanfield, acting also as his personal bank, and also runs a rim shop where Marlo often operates. During season three, he gives Stanfield advice on how to deal with his rival Avon Barksdale when Avon is released from prison. He continues to counsel Stanfield once he becomes embroiled in a turf war with Barksdale. He also acts as a liaison between Stanfield and Proposition Joe as Joe attempts to negotiate an end to the turf war.

It is Vinson who identifies Omar Little to Brother Mouzone on Mouzone's return to Baltimore seeking revenge. In season four, Marlo continues to use Vinson's rim shop as an occasional meeting place, though Vinson does not appear. Vinson appears in season 5 in the episode "React Quotes" at a meeting at the rim shop berating Monk for wearing a bulletproof vest. At the end of the series finale, Vinson is robbed and shot in the knee by Michael Lee.

=== Old Face Andre ===
- Played by: Alfonso Christian Lover
- Appears in season four: "Soft Eyes"; "Home Rooms"; "Refugees"; "Alliances"; "Corner Boys"; "Know Your Place".

Andre has a West side convenience store which serves as a stash house for Marlo Stanfield. He gets into Marlo's debt when the stash is robbed by Omar Little. Marlo is unforgiving and takes Andre's prized ring as a punishment. When Marlo is robbed by Omar, he includes Andre in his plan to get revenge on Omar. Chris Partlow murders a delivery woman in the store, telling Andre to call the police and say Omar did it.

Under interrogation from Michael Crutchfield and Vernon Holley, Andre is given a photo array of suspects where he quickly identifies Omar as responsible. Bunk Moreland believes Omar is innocent, and visits Andre's store. After talking Holley into coming with him to the crime scene, Bunk disproves Andre's identification of Omar. Holley and Bunk bring Andre in on a subpoena to court. Bunk asks the grand jury prosecutor what a perjury charge carries (10 years maximum) causing Andre to retract his original story.

Andre looks to Proposition Joe for protection from Marlo, not realizing Marlo has recently joined Proposition Joe's New Day Co-Op. Andre grudgingly gives Proposition Joe ownership of his store in exchange for $2,000 and a safe ride out of Baltimore. Instead of taking Andre out of town, Slim Charles escorts him to a back alley where he is greeted by Marlo's enforcers Chris and Snoop. Chris rebukes Andre's plea to not hide his body in a vacant building but promises to keep it quick as they walk him off to his execution.
