= Omar Little and associates =

Fictional criminal group from The Wire

Omar Little's Crew
- Founded by: Omar Little
- Years active: 1994–2008
- Territory: Baltimore, Maryland, U.S.
- Ethnicity: African American
- Criminal activities: Armed robbery
- Rivals: Barksdale Organization, New Day Co-Op, Stanfield Organization

The following are characters who have worked with Omar Little on the HBO drama The Wire. Omar and his associates make their living robbing drug dealers.

For the first three seasons, Omar mainly targets the Barksdale Organization. Later, he targets the Stanfield Organization, culminating with a robbery of the entire New Day Co-Op.

Omar and his crew never go after any "citizens" uninvolved in the drug trade. His crew typically comprises Baltimore stick-up artists whose motive for collaborating with Omar is the money associated with robbing drug dealers and stash houses. Omar is gay, and many other members of his crew have an LGBT background (e.g., Omar's boyfriends)

== Leadership ==
=== Omar Little ===
Omar Little is a legendary Baltimore stick-up thief and Robin Hood character, who steals from drug dealers while whistling, "A Hunting We Will Go". (Sometimes, the tune is characterized as "The Farmer in the Dell", as in season 1, episode 5 - "The Pager", when he concludes with, "the cheese stands alone".) Omar is unanimously disliked and feared by several drug dealers throughout the city, as his heists of their drugs and money hit them hard.

In contrast, his moral code keeps him on good terms with some Baltimore police. His bold robberies make him a hero amongst corner and neighborhood kids, and he proves to be one of The Wire characters with integrity and intelligence, including those who make mistakes, but own up to and learn from those errors in judgement.

=== Butchie ===
"Mostly blind" Butchie is Omar Little's bank, advisor, and close friend. Butchie runs a West Side Baltimore bar.

== Omar's boyfriends ==
=== Brandon Wright ===
- Played by: Michael Kevin Darnall
- Appears in season 1: "The Buys"; "Old Cases"; "The Pager" and "The Wire".

Brandon was Omar Little's boyfriend and a member of his stick-up crew. Brandon mistakenly used Omar's name in front of Barksdale drug dealers as they robbed their stash in the low rise projects; the name was reported back and started a long running feud between Omar and the Barksdale organization. Avon Barksdale placed bounties on all of Omar's crew. Brandon was spotted by Wallace and Poot Carr playing pinball at "The Greek's" - a restaurant on the west side.

They alerted D'Angelo Barksdale, who then passed the message to Stringer Bell. Stringer arrived with three Barksdale enforcers Marquis "Bird" Hilton, Roland "Wee-Bey" Brice and Anton "Stinkum" Artis. Brandon was captured by Bell's crew, tortured, and killed, his body displayed in the low rise projects as a warning to Omar on Avon's instructions. Afterward, Omar escalated their feud, refusing to relent after the ruthlessness shown, repeatedly referencing Brandon's murder as unnecessarily harsh.

=== Dante ===
- Played by: Ernest Waddell
- Appears in:

Season 2: "Hot Shots".
Season 3: "All Due Respect"; "Dead Soldiers"; "Straight and True"; "Homecoming"; "Moral Midgetry"; "Slapstick"; "Reformation" and "Mission Accomplished".

Dante becomes Omar Little's new boyfriend and stick-up crew member in the year following Brandon's death. Dante is jealous when Omar adds Kimmy and Tosha Mitchell to the crew.

In season 3, Dante accidentally kills Tosha during a gunfight that ensues while they are fleeing a heavily guarded Barksdale stash house, after a failed attempt at a stick-up (confirmed by commentary from David Simon and further dialogue in Episode 7), exacerbating the rift between Dante and the surviving Kimmy. Dante is kidnapped by Brother Mouzone and his associate Lamar in their effort to locate Omar.

Dante provides them with the necessary information after enduring a beating, notably less brutal than that which Brandon was able to endure. He is released after the conclusion of Omar and Mouzone's successful conspiracy to kill Stringer Bell. Dante was replaced by Renaldo in season 4, but there was no explanation given for his departure after season 3.

=== Renaldo ===
- Played by: Ramón Rodríguez
- Appears in

Season 4: "Home Rooms;" "Refugees;" "Misgivings;" "A New Day;" "That's Got His Own;" and "Final Grades."
Season 5: "Not for Attribution".

Renaldo is Omar's partner in season 4 and appears assisting him in the robbery of various drug dealers. Renaldo owns a taxi that he and Omar frequently use for surveillance of their targets. Renaldo is the show's first main Hispanic character and introduces other Hispanic characters into the show to assist in the robbery of the New Day Co-Op in the episode "That's Got His Own". Following the heist Omar and Renaldo leave Baltimore for an idyllic retirement in Puerto Rico, but Omar is compelled to return to Baltimore when Butchie is killed. Renaldo is not seen again after Butchie's death.

== Others ==
=== John Bailey ===
- Played by: Lance Williams
- Appears in season 1: "The Buys"; "Old Cases" and "The Pager".

Bailey was a member of Omar Little's stick-up crew who assisted him in robbing the Barksdale organization. Bailey was killed shortly afterwards, while visiting relatives. When arrested, Barksdale enforcer Wee-Bey Brice confessed to the murder. Bailey was known for having many enemies.

=== Kimmy ===
- Played by: Kelli R. Brown
- Appears in:

Season 2: "Hot Shots"; "Hard Cases" and "Bad Dreams".
Season 3: "All Due Respect"; "Dead Soldiers"; "Straight and True"; "Homecoming"; "Moral Midgetry" and "Slapstick".
Season 4: "That's Got His Own" and "Final Grades".

Kimmy and Tosha Mitchell were lovers and associates in robbing drug dealers. Omar Little returned to Baltimore and persuaded them both to join his crew. Kimmy was adept at infiltrating drug dealing operations, using a number of disguises including that of a nurse to Omar's disabled veteran.

Tosha was accidentally killed by Omar's boyfriend Dante, in a shoot-out following a heist on a Barksdale stash, leaving Kimmy distraught. When Omar persisted in his vendetta against the Barksdale organization, Kimmy decided to leave Omar's crew, stating that there were easier people to rob.

Kimmy reunites with Omar in an elaborate plot to steal Proposition Joe's large drug shipment meant for his co-op. Following the successful heist, Kimmy takes her cut of stolen drugs and tells Omar that she will now retire from this profession.

=== Tosha Mitchell ===
- Played by: Edwina Findley
- Appears in:

Season 2: "Hot Shots" and "Bad Dreams".
Season 3: "All Due Respect" and "Dead Soldiers".

Tosha Mitchell and Kimmy were lovers and associates in robbing drug dealers. Omar Little returned to Baltimore and persuaded them both to join his crew. Tosha was accidentally killed by Omar's boyfriend Dante, during a shoot-out following a heist.

=== Big Guy ===
- Played by: Derrick Purvey
- Appears in:

Season 4: "Margin of Error" (uncredited), "Unto Others" and "That's Got His Own" (uncredited)
Season 5: "Not for Attribution" and "Transitions" (uncredited)

Big Guy is a friend of Butchie's who works in his bar and acts as muscle for him. When Omar Little is arrested Butchie sends Big Guy and Donnie to protect him, and they both deliberately get imprisoned. Big Guy is at the bar when Chris Partlow and Snoop ambush Butchie, and is shot in the leg. The Stanfield enforcers kill Butchie and his bodyguard, and Big Guy is left alive as a witness. Big Guy tells his story to Omar upon his return to Baltimore.

=== Donnie ===
- Played by: Donnie Andrews
- Appears in:

Season 4: "Margin of Error" (uncredited), "Unto Others", "That's Got His Own" (uncredited) and "Final Grades" (uncredited)
Season 5: "Transitions" and "React Quotes"

Donnie is a friend of Butchie's who acts as muscle for him. When Omar Little is arrested Butchie sends Big Guy and Donnie to protect him, and they both deliberately get imprisoned. Donnie joins Omar in seeking revenge after the Stanfield Organization tortures and killed Butchie. Donnie suggests they target Monk, a Stanfield lieutenant. Chris Partlow sets an ambush for Omar and Donnie at Monk's apartment, and Donnie is shot and killed by Chris. (React Quotes)

Donnie was played by Larry "Donnie" Andrews, whose real life exploits inspired much of the character of Omar. Andrews was married to Fran Boyd, whom David Simon wrote about in The Corner.
