= Brandon Fobbs =

American actor

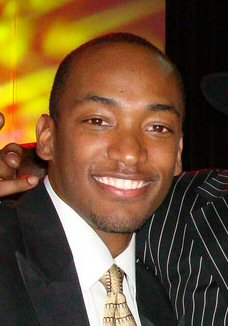
- Fobbs in 2008.
- Born: April 19, 1981 (age 45); Washington, D.C., U.S.
- Occupation: Actor
- Years active: 2004–present

Brandon Fobbs (born April 19, 1981) is an American actor.

He had a recurring role on HBO television series The Wire as Fruit. He also appeared in Pride (2007) and This Christmas and The Devil's Tomb.

== Selected filmography ==
- The Devil's Tomb (2009) (Direct-to-Video) as Click
