= Slim Charles =

Character from The Wire

- The Wire character
- Anwan Glover as Slim Charles
- First appearance: "Time After Time" (2004)
- Last appearance: "–30–" (2008)
- Created by: David Simon
- Portrayed by: Anwan Glover

In-universe information
- Aliases: Slim, Tall Man
- Gender: Male
- Title(s): Enforcer/Lieutenant in the Barksdale Organization, lieutenant to Proposition Joe, head of the New Day Co-Op

Slim Charles is a fictional character in the HBO drama The Wire, played by Anwan Glover. An enforcer for the Barksdale Organization and later the top lieutenant of kingpin Proposition Joe, he is portrayed as principled, loyal, and competent throughout his career.

The saga of the Barksdale Organization and the Stanfield Organization makes up the backbone of The Wire. Of the 30 or so characters connected with these gangs and those of Proposition Joe and Omar Little, Slim Charles is effectively the "last man standing," as by the end of the series most of the others are dead, and all the rest are incarcerated, neutralized, or have quit. As such, he can be viewed as the only winner in the drug trade plotline, particularly as in the series finale he progresses, along with Fat Face Rick, to the leadership of the New Day Co-Op and the pinnacle of the Baltimore drug trade.

== Character storyline ==
=== Season three ===
Slim Charles is hired as "muscle" by Stringer Bell, who is acting boss of the Barksdale Organization following the arrests of Avon Barksdale and several of the organization's original enforcers. Slim is first seen at the Barksdale strategy meeting following the demolition of the high rise projects. Shortly after, Omar Little attempts to rob a stash house that is under Slim's charge. Omar detains three of its guards, but is surprised by Slim Charles and three others, who recover the drugs in a firefight, during which Tosha and Tank are killed.

When Avon is released, Slim Charles is the only person he consults upon making a decision to go to war with Marlo Stanfield. On Avon's orders, Slim Charles puts together a team to strike against Marlo's subordinates. The team is headed by the experienced trio of Cutty, Country and Slim Charles, but on the opening day of hostilities Country is killed after younger soldiers did not follow their plan. Cutty quits, after he and Charles make an attempt on Stansfield lieutenant Fruit, Slim shoots and kills a corner boy but Cutty is unable to finish Fruit who flees. During a meeting with Avon, Cutty confesses "the game ain't in me anymore" quitting leaving Slim as the unquestioned Barksdale chief enforcer in the war.

Although Charles proves himself a capable and loyal soldier on many occasions, the support he gathers around himself is not up to the task. He is involved at an organizational level with the assassination attempts on Marlo and Omar, although he has a hands-on role in neither of the plans. When the operation against Marlo backfires and Avon is wounded, Charles brings a surgeon to the warehouse where the Barksdales regroup. Devonne who was also part of the setup is killed by Marlo, Charles informs Avon of this during a conversation with Stringer who is trying to bring a truce.

Meanwhile, when Gerard and Sapper sight Omar and phone Charles to confirm that he wants them to kill him even though it is a Sunday morning, he does not answer the phone - Gerard dismissively says that Charles must be sleeping in. However, after this operation too is botched, Charles angrily reproves the pair before sending them to answer to Avon himself.

Near the end of the war, he is taken aback by Stringer's demand that he must kill Senator Clay Davis, protesting that "...murder ain't no thing, but this here's some assassination shit." Shown up as a gangster without the political sensitivity of even Slim Charles, Avon rescinds the order, Stringer storms off and is caught in a fatal ambush set up by Omar and Brother Mouzone. Which Avon arranged in retaliation for killing D'Angelo, realising afterwards Stringer counsel was right.

Slim Charles consoles Avon after Stringer's death. When Avon tells Charles that he has lost heart for the war and that Stanfield was not responsible for the crime, Charles, now the organization's second-in-command, reminds him that they are in a war with no way to back down, and they must blame Stanfield in order to rally their troops. Shortly after, Slim Charles sees another opportunity to kill Stanfield when he finds him at Vinson's rimshop with little protection.

He phones Avon, who is busy gathering weapons and soldiers at a stash house. The attempt fails, as the stash house is raided by the Major Crimes Unit, acting on a tip given by Stringer to Major Colvin. Avon and most of his men are arrested. Slim Charles escapes arrest and prosecution because he is still waiting outside the rimshop at the time of the raid. With no backup arriving and no orders forthcoming Charles is forced to stand his crew down and watch as Marlo, Chris and Vinson all depart from the shop. Leaving him and Bodie as the only ones who were not picked up by the Police. During this time he finds work with Prop Joe.

=== Season four ===
With the Barksdale organization in ruins, Slim begins working for Proposition Joe, supplying the surviving ex-Barksdale drug dealers with narcotics. With this product as a firm foundation, Bodie Broadus builds a successful operation, until Marlo effortlessly threatens the helpless Bodie to work for him or be killed. Bodie came to Slim Charles, who advises him not to stand up to Stanfield. Charles raises the problem at the next meeting of the Co-Op but it is decided to negotiate with Stanfield and focus on problems with an incursion of New York dealers on the East side.

Charles is doubtful that Stanfield will talk to the Co-Op. He also tells the Co-Op how Stanfield has been hiding corpses in vacant row houses. Despite Slim Charles' misgivings, he attends the first negotiation meeting with Marlo, and later approaches Marlo's enforcer Chris Partlow to arrange a second sit down. Though he never says it directly, it is implied that Charles doesn't approve of Marlo's murderous enforcement. This is shown when Marlo has Little Kevin killed for not following directions to the letter. He is concerned enough by the crime to tell Bodie that his friend has been executed. Bodie's subsequent crusade against Marlo quickly gets him killed, leaving Slim as one of the last Barksdale survivors.

In between his responsibilities as the East side's head enforcer, Charles still independently visits Bodie and Poot Carr as a confidant. As a gift to Marlo when an alliance is agreed upon, Joe orders Charles to betray Old Face Andre and hand him over to Marlo for execution. At the end of the season, he prophetically warns Prop Joe about letting Marlo meet up with their contacts (The Greek and others), fearing that Marlo will 'go round the co-op'.

=== Season five ===
By season five Slim Charles is Joe's most trusted lieutenant. He is also one of three remaining active survivors of the Barksdale Organization, along with Savino Bratton and Poot, who has left the drug trade after Bodie's death. When Butchie is killed, Omar Little returns to Baltimore and ambushes Slim, but lets him go when Slim convinces him that Joe had nothing to do with it. (Transitions)

After Joe is killed, Marlo dissolves the Co-Op and takes charge as sole leader of Baltimore's kingpins, with Joe's nephew Cheese as his new lieutenant. Slim knows that Marlo and Cheese were responsible for Joe's death and disapproves of the way they now conduct business, staying discreetly out of their way. He refuses Marlo's offer to make him take the lead in the deceased Hungry Man's territory in Baltimore County, with Cheese taking the role after Slim declines. ("The Dickensian Aspect")

In the series finale Slim and Cheese are among the remaining drug lords who band together to buy the connection to Baltimore's best drug suppliers from Marlo, a connection which Marlo stole from Proposition Joe before killing him. As the kingpins gather to discuss business, Cheese shows little grief over Proposition Joe's death, saying it led to their benefit since they will now have control of the best heroin connection. Slim Charles then shoots Cheese in the head before he has a chance to finish talking. When Co-Op member Clinton "Shorty" Buise criticizes Slim because now they have to pay more money to make up for the lack of Cheese's bid, Slim simply replies "That was for Joe". In the ending montage, it is shown that Slim and Fat Face Rick are representing the Co-Op to the Greeks. ("-30-)".
