= Michael Willis (actor) =

American actor

- Born: October 4, 1949 (age 76); Lancaster, Pennsylvania, U.S.
- Occupation: Actor

Michael Willis (born October 4, 1949) is an American television and movie character actor. Willis' credits include movie roles in Pushing Tin and Men in Black, and several episodes of Law & Order.

Willis was born in Lancaster, Pennsylvania. He was a seven-year veteran of the U.S. Air Force from 1970 to 1976, serving during the Vietnam War. After completing his service, Willis turned to theater acting with the Woolly Mammoth Theatre Company in Washington, D.C. Critical acclaim of Willis' stage work lead to the actor pursuing a movie and television career.

A Calvert County, Maryland resident, Willis has been involved in numerous Maryland-based film and television projects, including films by Barry Levinson and John Waters, and recurring roles on Homicide:Life on the Street (as Darin Russom) and HBO's The Wire (as Andy Krawczyk).

Willis is married to his wife Lori, and the couple has three children.
