= Chris Partlow =

Character from The Wire

- The Wire character
- Gbenga Akkinagbe as Chris Partlow
- First appearance: "Straight and True" (2004)
- Last appearance: "-30-" (2008)
- Created by: David Simon
- Portrayed by: Gbenga Akinnagbe

In-universe information
- Gender: Male
- Occupation: Drug organization enforcer
- Children: 2

Christopher "Chris" Partlow is a fictional character on the HBO drama The Wire, played by actor Gbenga Akinnagbe. Chris is Marlo Stanfield's second-in-command, main enforcer, and bodyguard in his drug dealing operation. He is a minor antagonist for season 3 and the secondary antagonist in season 4 and 5 along with Felicia "Snoop" Pearson. Despite Chris's quiet demeanor he commits more murders, both on-screen and off-screen, than any other character. Although a ruthless killer, he shows genuine care towards the soldiers under his command, especially Michael Lee, whom he takes under his wing as a protégé.

== Character storyline ==
=== Season 3 ===
Chris is a key player in the Stanfield Organization's turf war with the Barksdale Organization and is always looking out for Marlo's safety. He often meets with Marlo and Marlo's advisor Vinson to discuss their strategy.

Chris identifies Avon Barksdale's car when Avon tries to set a trap for Marlo. Chris has his driver pull up alongside the Barksdale car, then fires a shotgun into the side window, wounding Avon and killing a Barksdale soldier named Tater. When Marlo kills Devonne, the woman responsible for setting up the attempted ambush, Chris accompanies him and calmly tells Marlo that it needed to be done.

When Stringer Bell is murdered (by Omar Little and Brother Mouzone), Chris and Felicia "Snoop" Pearson are assumed to be responsible and they do nothing to dispel these rumors. The turf war comes to an end when Stringer's death and Avon's arrest with most of his crew, lead to the demise of the Barksdale Organization, and Stanfield assumes control of most of the drug trade in West Baltimore.

=== Season 4 ===
Chris carries out murders as Stanfield orders them. Working alongside Partlow's protege, young female soldier "Snoop", Chris disposes of bodies by opening up vacant buildings, covering the corpses in quicklime and plastic sheeting, and using a nail gun to shut the buildings.

Chris suggests caution after Stanfield drug dealer Fruit is slain, recommending they execute the offender rather than all members of the independent narcotics team he works with. Marlo agrees with Chris's approach and gives him the go-ahead to kill Fruit's murderer, Lex. Chris arranges for Lex to be ambushed by paying Little Kevin to tell Lex his girlfriend wants to meet him at night in a secluded spot. Kevin pays an unwitting Randy Wagstaff to pass on the message. Once the trap is sprung, Lex is killed by Chris and Snoop.

Chris is also responsible for the murder of a security guard who "talked back" to Marlo. Rumors on the street tie Chris to several other murders, including victims known as Pookie and Byron.

Chris continues to be Marlo's key adviser. He tries to dissuade Marlo from playing at a high-stakes card game where he is losing a considerable amount of money. When Omar Little robs the game, Marlo asks Chris for his advice on how best to deal with Omar. Chris suggests a more subtle approach than simply placing a bounty on Omar. They plan to stage a robbery of their associate Old Face Andre and blame the robbery on Omar, having Andre identify him. Chris carries out the robbery himself, and kills a delivery woman in Andre's store and beats Andre to lend credence to their scenario.

Marlo entrusts Chris with cultivating new prospect Michael Lee, a middle school child who Marlo believes would make a good soldier.

Chris is responsible for intimidating Lex's crew chief Bodie Broadus into giving up his corner, since Marlo has seen that Bodie has turned it into a profitable location. Chris forces Bodie to accept Marlo's package, which is inferior to the high quality heroin Bodie had been purchasing from Proposition Joe Stewart.

Chris asks Bodie about Michael, having noticed that Michael had worked with Bodie for a time. Chris tracks Michael to his home and then approaches him when he is talking with Dukie, Namond Brice, and Randy. Chris offers Michael cash and promises of protection if he joins Marlo's organization, an offer that Michael eventually accepts after the unwelcome return of his stepfather, Devar, who (it is implied) had molested Michael and might be grooming Bug to be his next victim.

At Michael's request, Chris and Snoop take care of the situation with Michael's stepfather. When he confronts Devar, Chris questions him about molesting little boys and asks him about any past homosexual activity in prison. After Devar dismissively admits to having homosexual sex while locked up, Chris beats him to death. The viciousness and fury he unleashes upon Devar starkly contrasts the business-like way he usually kills people; it is implied that Chris, too, may have been sexually abused as a child (it was confirmed by series creator David Simon during DVD audio commentary that both Michael and Chris were victims of childhood sexual abuse).

Michael joins the Stanfield Organization under the condition they also look out for his younger brother, Bug. Chris takes Michael on as a protégé to the point where Marlo refers to Michael as Chris's "pup". Chris appears to relate to Michael and his implied history of abuse, and takes Michael under his wing.

Chris and Snoop are twice pulled over by detectives during the season. The first time, it is by Herc, who had been following them, but Chris is able to hide their firearms in a hidden compartment. Herc discovers their nail gun and lime in the back of the vehicle, but takes little notice. Once they are released, Chris disposes of the nail gun.

The second time, they are confronted by Kima Greggs and Lester Freamon. Snoop again hides their firearms, but Kima discovers the hidden gun compartment and weapons. Chris and Snoop are arrested but later released, as the police can tie neither the weapons nor the vehicle to either of them.

Eventually, the police are able to demonstrate not only that Chris (and thus Marlo) is responsible for the chain of disappearances in West Baltimore, but also that they have been disposing of the bodies in row houses all over town.

=== Season 5 ===
Chris faces weapon charges from his arrest at the car stop but manages to get the hearings delayed. In the meantime, the police cannot gather enough evidence to file charges on the vacant house murders related to Chris and Snoop, and begin a prolonged surveillance operation of the Stanfield Organization. Marlo and Chris respond to the investigation by stopping all phone communication to avoid further incriminating themselves, and instead meet face to face; they also scale back on committing violent crimes.

Chris continues to mentor Michael Lee, who at this point was given his own corner after a meeting with Chris, Snoop, and Marlo following Chris's murder of Devar. Upon concluding those issues, Marlo begins to scheme against the co-op, plotting against "Proposition Joe" Stewart by gathering information on his suppliers, so that he can establish his own connection to them and cut out the rest of the Baltimore crews and dealers who are dependent on the high quality supply of drugs sold by The Greek.

Marlo's efforts allow him to gain new information regarding the dealers, and he instructs Chris to arrange a meeting with imprisoned Ukrainian enforcer Sergei Malatov to broker a meeting with The Greeks, after finding out Sergei is connected to The Greeks. Chris finds more information on Malatov at the courthouse, resulting in an initial meeting with Avon Barksdale, who is incarcerated in the same prison as Sergei, and formerly part of the drug ring connected to Sergei, and serves as the gatekeeper to Sergei.

While Marlo conspires to wholesale drugs, the Major Case Unit is shut down as part of Mayor Carcetti's cutbacks on public spending, including policing. Consequently, narcotics, violent crimes, and homicides cannot be monitored as closely by the Baltimore police. Stanfield's organization notices this and resumes its criminal activities with full effect: Chris and Snoop gun down Junebug (a rival who may have been spreading rumors about Stanfield), attack Webster Franklin's territory (as he had refused the Stanfield package), and lure Omar Little out of retirement in Puerto Rico.

Chris leaves the Webster Franklin assignment to Snoop, but takes Snoop and Michael with him to kill Junebug. Chris waits for Junebug outside the victim's home and tutors Michael on the importance of the element of surprise. They disable the surveillance cameras, and Chris orders Michael to kill anyone who escapes out the back of the house. Chris and Snoop then stage a home invasion, killing Junebug, his bodyguard, and his domestic partner. The two children present survive: one hides in a closet, while the other flees out the back door. Michael lets the child go. The triple homicide is investigated by Detective Kima Greggs.

Stanfield offered a bounty to anyone who provides a way to get to Omar, and Prop Joe's nephew Cheese gives up Butchie behind Joe's back, telling Chris the exact details of Omar's link to Butchie. Upon getting Snoop to scout Butchie's bar, Chris and Snoop kill one of his bodyguards and wound the other. They then brutally torture Butchie with multiple gunshot wounds and other assaults, while force feeding him alcohol to subdue the pain. As they learn nothing from him about Omar's relationship to the bar owner, who serves as Omar's trusted advisor, bank, and close friend, or about Omar's location, Chris kills Butchie with a fatal head shot. He then instructs Butchie's surviving bodyguard to ensure that word of this event reaches Omar.

Omar returns to Baltimore from Puerto Rico, after being told of Butchie's murder. Snoop expresses worry, as they learned nothing about Omar's whereabouts, but Omar will now target them. Chris reminds her they're working for Marlo, and Marlo wants Omar, so they'll keep Marlo inside and move around themselves until they kill him.

Stanfield successfully connects with The Greeks, and Joe accompanies him to a meeting with Spiros Vondas. At a later meeting without Joe, Stanfield persuades The Greeks to consider him an insurance policy if Joe is ever unable to do business with them in the future. Stanfield then convinces Cheese to betray Joe by having Chris kidnap Cheese's rival—an East side Co-Op dealer named Hungry Man. Chris delivers Hungry Man to Cheese, and Cheese gives up Joe in exchange. Stanfield and Chris trap Joe in his home, and Chris murders Joe while Stanfield watches.

As Marlo meets with Spiros Vondas in a city park, Chris and a Greek enforcer watch over the area. Vondas explains how Marlo is to communicate with him using picture messages on a Blackberry phone.

After the meeting, Marlo tells Chris how good it feels to be wearing the crown and suggests a celebratory trip to Atlantic City. A cautious Chris reminds Marlo that Omar is going to make a move on them, suggesting that it is not the best time for a vacation. Chris then tells his family that he will be going away on business for a few weeks. From the sidewalk across the street, Marlo watches Chris's interactions with his children and their mother.

Later that evening, Omar observes Monk's condominium. Chris later informs Marlo of Omar's reconnaissance. When Omar later attacks Monk's apartment, he walks into a trap: Chris, Michael, Snoop, and O-Dog are lying in wait. Donnie is shot dead, but Omar jumps from the balcony to escape, severely injuring his leg in the process.

With Omar at large, Chris lies low for his own safety, worried about the safety of his girlfriend and children. After Kenard kills Omar, Chris is shown to be disappointed, but he readily returns to work.

In the meantime, Bunk has used DNA evidence to connect Chris with the murder of Michael's stepfather Devar (Chris spat on Devar's corpse). Bunk delays arresting Chris as a favor to McNulty and Lester.

When the police bust a narcotics resupply transaction from The Greeks, Chris is charged with murder, preventing his release on bail. Levy represents Chris and Stanfield, and suspects an illegal wiretap due to the speed with which charging documents were produced.

In an effort to preserve as much of the case as possible, Rhonda Pearlman strikes a bargain with Levy: Levy will convince the Stanfield organization to plead to various charges and in exchange, Pearlman will not reveal Levy's bribery of Grand Jury Prosecutor Gary DiPasquale at the city courthouse. Part of this deal involves Chris's pleading guilty not only to murdering Michael's stepfather Devar, but also to all of the bodies found in the vacant buildings, charges which yield a sentence of life without parole. Chris willingly takes the life sentence for the Stanfield organization on the condition that his girlfriend and children are taken care of financially.

Chris is briefly seen during the end-of-season montage conversing amicably with Wee-Bey Brice in the courtyard of the Maryland State prison; they are in a similar situation, both were primary enforcers for West Baltimore kingpins and now are serving life sentences for committing murders (and taking sole responsibility for some murders they did not commit in exchange for their family being taken care of), at the behest of their respective bosses, all in service of protecting their families and their organizations, in which both organizations dissolved by the end of the series.
