= The Wire season 4 =

The Wire
- Season 4
- DVD cover
- Starring: Dominic West; John Doman; Frankie R. Faison; Aidan Gillen; Deirdre Lovejoy; Clarke Peters; Wendell Pierce; Lance Reddick; Andre Royo; Sonja Sohn; Jim True-Frost; Robert Wisdom; Seth Gilliam; Domenick Lombardozzi; Reg E. Cathey; Chad L. Coleman; Jamie Hector; Glynn Turman; J. D. Williams; Michael K. Williams; Corey Parker Robinson
- No. of episodes: 13

Release
- Original network: HBO
- Original release: September 10 – December 10, 2006

Season chronology
- ← Previous; Season 3 Next → Season 5

The fourth season of the television series The Wire commenced airing in the United States on September 10, 2006, concluded on December 10, 2006, and contained 13 episodes. It introduces Baltimore's school system and several middle school students while continuing to examine the remnants of the Barksdale Organization, the ascendant Stanfield Organization, the Baltimore Police Department and politicians.

The fourth season aired on Sundays at 10:00 pm ET in the United States. The season was released on DVD as a four-disc boxed set under the title of The Wire: The Complete Fourth Season on December 4, 2007 by HBO Video.

== Production ==
=== Crew ===
Playwright and television writer/producer Eric Overmyer joined the crew for the show's fourth season as a consulting producer and writer. He had previously worked on Homicide and was brought into the full-time production staff to replace George Pelecanos who scaled back his involvement in order to concentrate on his next book and he worked on the fourth season solely as a writer. David Mills, Emmy-award winner, Homicide and The Corner writer and college friend of Simon, joined the writing staff in the fourth season. Regular writer Ed Burns became a producer on The Wire in this season.

=== Cast ===
The focus of the fourth season shifted between a local school, the mayoral election, police department politics and action on the street corners. The returning starring cast consisted of Dominic West as Officer Jimmy McNulty, the formerly insubordinate detective who attempts to shed his ability and his problems in favor of a better life. West was at the time homesick and wanting to spend time with his young daughter in England; he also felt the character's plot arc had reached a reasonable end point in season 3, so West arranged with the writers for McNulty's role to be greatly reduced in Season 4.

Lance Reddick reprised his role as newly promoted Major Cedric Daniels, now commanding the western district. One of Daniels's sergeants within the district was Sergeant Ellis Carver, portrayed by Seth Gilliam. Robert Wisdom reprised his role as former western district commander Howard "Bunny" Colvin, who has become a field researcher after a short stint working in hotel security following his retirement from the Baltimore Police Department.

The Major Crimes Unit saw a shift in personnel this season. Kima Greggs, portrayed by Sonja Sohn, and Lester Freamon, portrayed by Clarke Peters, transferred to the Homicide Unit after the new lieutenant of the Major Crimes Unit ends the wire and halts Freamon's investigation of the Barksdale money. Corey Parker-Robinson portrayed Detective Leander Sydnor, one of two detectives who remain in the Major Crimes Unit after the arrival of the new lieutenant. Domenick Lombardozzi returned as Thomas "Herc" Hauk, a former member of the Major Crimes Unit whose work on the mayor's security detail earns him a promotion to sergeant and a transfer back to his old unit after Freamon and Greggs' departure.

Wendell Pierce portrayed veteran homicide detective Bunk Moreland. Deirdre Lovejoy starred as assistant state's attorney Rhonda Pearlman, the legal liaison between the unit and the courthouse. Andre Royo returned as Bubbles, who continued to indulge his drug addiction and act as an occasional informant. Jim True-Frost portrayed Roland "Prez" Pryzbylewski, a former member of the Major Crimes Unit who has become a teacher in an inner city school after inadvertently killing a fellow officer in season three.

The police were overseen by two commanding officers more concerned with politics and their own careers than the case, Deputy Commissioner of Operations William Rawls (John Doman) and Commissioner Ervin Burrell (Frankie Faison). At city hall, Tommy Carcetti (Aidan Gillen) was an ambitious city councilman seeking to become mayor. Joining the cast for the fourth season was Reg E. Cathey as Carcetti's deputy campaign manager, Norman Wilson. Also joining the cast after having a recurring role during the third season was Glynn Turman as Mayor Clarence Royce.

On the streets, former Barksdale crew chief Bodie Broadus (J. D. Williams) joined the organization of new drug kingpin Marlo Stanfield (Jamie Hector). Michael K. Williams portrayed renowned stick-up man Omar Little. Joining the cast this season after having a recurring role in season three is Chad L. Coleman as Dennis "Cutty" Wise, a reformed member of the Barksdale organization who has opened a boxing gym for neighborhood children.

Two members of the third season starring cast did not return for the fourth season following the termination of their characters' storylines. Both Wood Harris (Avon Barksdale) and Idris Elba (Stringer Bell) left the starring cast in the final episode of the third season.

==== Recurring characters ====
Many guest stars from the earlier seasons reprised their roles. Proposition Joe (Robert F. Chew), the East Side's cautious drug kingpin, became more cooperative with the Stanfield Organization following the death of Stringer Bell. His lieutenant, and nephew, "Cheese" (Method Man) continued to elude the Major Crimes Unit investigation. Hassan Johnson reprises his role as incarcerated Barksdale enforcer Wee-Bey Brice. Former Barksdale enforcer Slim Charles (Anwan Glover) returned as a new recruit to Proposition Joe's organization. Several members of the Stanfield Organization introduced in season three also returned: Chris Partlow (Gbenga Akinnagbe), Stanfield's chief enforcer; and Felicia "Snoop" Pearson (Felicia Pearson), Partlow's protégé. Tray Chaney continues to portray former Barksdale crew chief Poot Carr, who joins the Stanfield organization this season.

Michael Hyatt reprised her role as Brianna Barksdale. Michael Kostroff returned as the defense attorney Maurice Levy. Isiah Whitlock, Jr. reprised his role as corrupt State Senator Clay Davis whose involvement with Barksdale money causes him trouble with the Major Crimes Unit. Omar Little's crew shifted focus to the Stanfield Organization and the New Day Co-op and consisted of his new boyfriend Renaldo (Ramón Rodríguez), partner Kimmy (Kelli R. Brown), and advisor Butchie (S. Robert Morgan).

Many guest stars also reprised their characters from the police department. Returning guest stars in the homicide unit included Delaney Williams as Sergeant Jay Landsman, Ed Norris as Detective Ed Norris, and Brian Anthony Wilson as Detective Vernon Holley. Al Brown and Jay Landsman reprised their roles as Major Stan Valchek and Lieutenant Dennis Mello. Michael Salconi recurred as veteran Western patrolman Michael Santangelo. Gregory L. Williams played Michael Crutchfield, a cantankerous homicide detective. Joilet F. Harris returned as Caroline Massey, an officer in the Major Crimes Unit. Joining the Major Crimes Unit this season is Kenneth Dozerman (Rick Otto). In the western district, Carver's squad includes Anthony Colicchio (Benjamin Busch), Lloyd "Truck" Garrick (Ryan Sands), and Lambert (Nakia Dillard).

In the political storyline, Cleo Reginald Pizana returned as Coleman Parker, Royce's chief-of-staff. Brandy Burre appeared as Theresa D'Agostino, a political campaign consultant. Frederick Strother performed as Odell Watkins, a state delegate and political king-maker. Christopher Mann played Carcetti's city council colleague Anthony Gray. Maria Broom returns as Marla Daniels, the estranged wife of Major Daniels who is running for a seat on the city council.

The fourth season also saw the return of two former starring characters from the second season: Amy Ryan as Officer Beadie Russell, an officer at the port and Jimmy McNulty's domestic partner, and Paul Ben-Victor as Spiros Vondas, the second in command of the Greek's drug smuggling operation.

The shift of focus to the schools saw the introduction of four young actors in major recurring roles this season: Jermaine Crawford as Duquan "Dukie" Weems; Maestro Harrell as Randy Wagstaff; Julito McCullum as Namond Brice; and Tristan Wilds as Michael Lee. The characters are friends from a West Baltimore middle school. Other new characters from the school included Tootsie Duvall as Assistant Principal Marcia Donnelly; David Parenti (Dan DeLuca), a Professor of Social Work at the University of Maryland who works with Bunny Colvin in the school to study potential violent offenders; Stacie Davis portrayed Miss Duquette, a doctoral student who works with Parenti and Colvin; Aaron "Bug" Manigault (Keenon Brice), Michael Lee's younger brother; Kenard (Thuliso Dingwall), one of the younger members of Namond Brice's circle of friends; and Richard Hidlebird as Principal Claudell Withers.

==== Main cast ====
- Dominic West as James "Jimmy" McNulty (9 episodes), a BPD officer who enjoys his relaxing work on street patrol.
- John Doman as William Rawls (11 episodes), the BPD's deputy commissioner who begins plotting against Burrell.
- Frankie Faison as Ervin Burrell (10 episodes), the BPD's commissioner whose job security is threatened.
- Aidan Gillen as Thomas "Tommy" Carcetti (13 episodes), an ambitious city councilman who runs for mayor against Royce.
- Deirdre Lovejoy as Rhonda Pearlman (9 episodes), an assistant state's attorney and Daniels's partner.
- Clarke Peters as Lester Freamon (11 episodes), an intelligent BPD major crimes detective whose determination to do good work makes him unpopular amongst his superiors.
- Wendell Pierce as William "Bunk" Moreland (12 episodes), an intelligent BPD homicide detective who is forced to help an old acquaintance.
- Lance Reddick as Cedric Daniels (12 episodes), a major and commander of the Western district who catches Carcetti's eye with his good conduct.
- Andre Royo as Reginald "Bubbles" Cousins (9 episodes), a friendly heroin addict who struggles with his relationship with his friend and a man who keeps attacking him.
- Sonja Sohn as Shakima "Kima" Greggs (12 episodes), a BPD major crimes detective who finds herself grappling with a sudden and forced career change.
- Jim True-Frost as Roland "Prez" Pryzbylewski (13 episodes), a former BPD officer who is hired as a math teacher for a struggling middle school.
- Robert Wisdom as Howard "Bunny" Colvin (11 episodes), a former BPD major who assists in a study on at-risk youth and forms a bond with one of the subjects.
- Seth Gilliam as Ellis Carver (11 episodes), a BPD sergeant who is tasked with protecting a vulnerable witness.
- Domenick Lombardozzi as Thomas "Herc" Hauk (13 episodes), a BPD sergeant whose attempts to catch Marlo land his job in hot water.
- Reg E. Cathey as Norman Wilson (13 episodes), Carcetti's level-headed campaign manager.
- Chad L. Coleman as Dennis "Cutty" Wise (7 episodes), a reformed, kind-hearted Barksdale soldier who runs a boxing gym for local boys.
- Jamie Hector as Marlo Stanfield (13 episodes), a drug kingpin who develops a unique way to hide bodies connected to him.
- Glynn Turman as Clarence Royce (7 episodes), Baltimore's mayor who fights desperately to hold his position as election season approaches.
- J. D. Williams as Preston "Bodie" Broadus (9 episodes), an independent dealer who becomes resentful working under Marlo.
- Michael K. Williams as Omar Little (9 episodes), an extremely dangerous robber who runs afoul of Marlo.
- Corey Parker Robinson as Leander Sydnor (11 episodes), a BPD major crimes detective.

== Reception ==
"...a dazzling three-ring circus of interwoven plot threads, and its take on America’s drug war makes Miami Vice look like a Saturday-morning cartoon..."

— Stephen King

The fourth season of The Wire is listed as one of the highest rated individual TV seasons of all time on Metacritic with a score of 98 out of 100 based on 21 critics—including 17 perfect score reviews. On Rotten Tomatoes, the season has an approval rating of 100% with an average score of 9.7/10 based on 24 reviews. The website's critical consensus reads, "Realistically flawed characters in harrowing, uncompromising circumstances, along with engrossing storytelling, make The Wire one of TV's top dramas of its time."

=== Awards and nominations ===
11th Satellite Awards

- Nomination for Best Drama Series

Writers Guild of America Awards

- Award for Best Drama Series
- Nomination for Best Drama Episode (David Simon & Ed Burns) (Episode: "Final Grades")

23rd TCA Awards

- Nomination for Program of the Year
- Nomination for Outstanding Achievement in Drama

== Episodes ==
All episodes were made available by HBO six days earlier than their broadcast date, via On Demand.

No. overall	No. in season	Title	Directed by	Written by	Original release date
38	1	"Boys of Summer"	Joe Chappelle	Story by : David Simon & Ed Burns; Teleplay by : David Simon	September 10, 2006
Epigraph: "Lambs to the slaughter here." -Marcia Donnelly Bodie's man Curtis "Lex" Anderson kills Fruit over a woman they both slept with. Marlo's dealer "Little" Kevin has Cheese Wagstaff's estranged son Randy lure Lex to a vacant house, where Chris and Snoop Pearson (Note: A Stanfield soldier who works alongside Chris, first seen in "Homecoming".) kill him and nail the house shut. McNulty politely rejects Daniels's request that he rejoin major crimes. Carcetti grows disillusioned with his campaign after seeing his low poll numbers. Prez is hired as a math teacher at Edward Tilghman Middle School after the principal learns he was a police officer. (Note: Prez was fired after accidentally killing an undercover cop, as depicted in "Slapstick".) Randy's friend Dukie Weems is beaten by a rival group of boys, so he and their friends pelt them with urine-filled water balloons and get in a brawl.
39	2	"Soft Eyes"	Christine Moore	Story by : Ed Burns & David Mills; Teleplay by : David Mills	September 17, 2006
Epigraph: "I still wake up white in a city that ain't." -Carcetti Having joined Royce's security detail, Herc walks in on him receiving oral sex from his secretary. Stan Valchek (Note: A BPD major and Prez's father-in-law, first seen in "The Buys".) advises him to stay quiet for the time being. State's witness Fredo Braddock is murdered, which Carcetti startles Royce with during a debate. Freamon serves subpoenas on Davis and Andy Krawczyk for their ties to Stringer. Greggs hears Marlo mention convenience store owner Andre Tonesin over the phone. Embarrassed by his poor math skills, Bubbles's young friend Sherrod goes back to school. Marlo pays for the school supplies of local boys, but Michael Lee rejects the money and takes up temporary work under Bodie for his half-brother Aaron "Bug" Manigault. Wee-Bey Brice's (Note: An incarcerated Barksdale soldier, first seen in "The Target".) wife De'Londa presses their son Namond into working for him too.
40	3	"Home Rooms"	Seith Mann	Story by : Ed Burns & Richard Price; Teleplay by : Richard Price	September 24, 2006
Epigraph: "I love the first day, man. Everybody all friendly an' shit." -Namond Brice Greggs observes Andre receiving drugs and leaves just before Omar robs his store. To appease Davis, Rawls appoints lieutenant Charles Marimow as head of major crimes, who shuts down the wiretaps while Freamon and Greggs are transferred to homicide. Royce orders Braddock's role downplayed in the press instead of funding witness protection due to Carcetti's support for funding, upsetting Odell Watkins. He has Burrell promote Herc to sergeant for his silence. The deacon (Note: A local man who often helps with community projects, first seen in "All Due Respect".) informs Colvin that a UMD sociology professor is studying repeat violent offenders, so Colvin takes him to Tilghman Middle and convinces him to study there. Prez struggles to teach his students and two girls fight in his class, where one slashes the other with a box cutter and is forcibly restrained by Grace Sampson.
41	4	"Refugees"	Jim McKay	Story by : Ed Burns & Dennis Lehane; Teleplay by : Dennis Lehane	October 1, 2006
Epigraph: "No one wins. One side just loses more slowly." -Prez Marlo has a security guard killed when he is confronted over stealing from a store. Joe Stewart asks him for help driving New York dealers off the New Day Co-Op's territory, giving Omar the location of Marlo's poker game to rob when he refuses. Carcetti promises to work with the city's ministers if he wins. Watkins is upset to learn that Royce has pulled support from Marla. Burrell assigns the Braddock case to Greggs to stall it for Royce. Having identified Lex as Fruit's killer, Bunk and Freamon suspect his death upon seeing a memorial shrine in his mother's house. Bubbles learns that Sherrod is cutting school and threatens to leave him, but later ignores evidence of him continuing to skip. Colvin is authorized to study Tilghman Middle and observes class behaviors. Cutty is hired as a truant officer for the school and finds that it prioritizes securing funding by only making students come the minimum amount of days. He takes Justin and Michael to a boxing match, the latter of whom refuses a ride home.
42	5	"Alliances"	David Platt	Story by : David Simon & Ed Burns; Teleplay by : Ed Burns	October 8, 2006
Epigraph: "If you with us, you with us." -Chris Partlow Chris kills a woman in Andre's store and orders him to frame Omar. Marimow orders useless raids on Marlo, though Carver identifies where he holds meetings. Herc illegally installs a hidden camera and is spotted by a Stanfield man. Marlo agrees to help the Co-Op if they stop Herc. Valchek informs Carcetti of Royce's case tampering and the press picks it up. Royce blames it on Burrell and sets up Rawls to replace him, while Watkins pulls his support and is wooed by Carcetti. Bubbles finds Sherrod dealing and is attacked by a customer for holding him up. Colvin divides the students into nurtured and groomed for dealing, proposing a program to help the latter. Prez tries to give Dukie new clothes to prevent mockery from his peers, but learns that they were stolen by his family to sell. Randy stands guard for a pair of boys while they have sex with their classmate Tiff at school. He admits his role in Lex's murder to Dukie and his fear that Chris turned him into a zombie, so Dukie shows him another vacant house body.
43	6	"Margin of Error"	Dan Attias	Story by : Ed Burns & Eric Overmyer; Teleplay by : Eric Overmyer	October 15, 2006
Epigraph: "Don't try this shit at home." -Norman Wilson Davis offers his support to Carcetti, only to upsell his support to Royce after being paid. Prez gives Dukie clothes to keep at school and a way to wash up before class. Randy tells assistant principal Marcia Donnelly about Lex to get out of trouble when Tiff accuses the boys of rape. Prez asks Daniels for help, who gives the case to Carver. Omar is arrested. Marlo sets up a fake drug deal to confirm police presence, where Herc detains an innocent woman. Brianna Barksdale cuts the Brices off as her money starts to run out and De'Londa forces Namond to sell for Bodie. Bodie's dealer "Spider" quits the gym after Cutty sleeps with his mother. Royce concedes, leaving Carcetti to win the primary due to the city's heavy democratic lean. He rejects Theresa D'Agostino when she comes on to him.
44	7	"Unto Others"	Anthony Hemingway	Story by : Ed Burns & William F. Zorzi; Teleplay by : William F. Zorzi	October 29, 2006
Epigraph: "Aw yeah. That golden rule." -The Bunk Omar learns that Marlo has put a bounty on him and reminds Bunk that he is owed a favor, (Note: A reference to "All Prologue", where Omar helped put Bird Hilton in jail.) and he is moved to a safer facility. Carver has Herc watch Randy while he calls Bunk, but the detective working Omar's case spitefully drops the call. Herc presses Randy to lie when he can only name Kevin as part of Lex's murder, forgetting to pass him to Bunk when he refuses. Greggs returns to the scene of Braddock's shooting and finds a nearby backyard full of gunfire, learning that the resident accidentally hit Braddock during target practice. Carcetti's aide Norman Wilson warns him about the optics of a white mayor firing Burrell. He observes a murder scene and is impressed with how Daniels handles it. Marlo steals the camera. Cutty quits his job. Spider refuses to accept his apology, and he promises his students he will do better. Prez teaches his students probability after noticing them gambling and discovers untouched computers in the school's storeroom. Namond puts together a crew of friends and fights Sherrod over territory. He fails to get himself suspended to avoid Colvin's class. As Bubbles is again attacked, he finds Sherrod using drugs and begs him to come home.
45	8	"Corner Boys"	Agnieszka Holland	Story by : Ed Burns & Richard Price; Teleplay by : Richard Price	November 5, 2006
Epigraph: "We got our thing, but it's just part of the big thing." -Zenobia Prez's class performs poorly on a test save for Dukie. Bug's father Devar returns from prison to Michael's dismay. Colvin has a discussion with his class about the factors that lead them to dealing. De'Londa confronts Bodie about territory when Namond undersells. Bunk hears Andre's story firsthand and pokes holes in it, getting him to recant. Rawls tells Carcetti that Burrell is more concerned with good numbers and Burrell realizes that Rawls is moving against him. Daniels informs Carcetti of Rawls's destruction of major crimes. The woman Herc arrested files a complaint and he claims to Marimow that the bust was justified by an informant. He pulls over Chris and Snoop, who have been killing New York dealers. After he finds a nail gun, they dispose of their weapons.
46	9	"Know Your Place"	Alex Zakrzewski	Story by : Ed Burns & Kia Corthron; Teleplay by : Kia Corthron	November 12, 2006
Epigraph: "Might as well dump 'em, get another." -Proposition Joe Bubbles identifies Kevin to Herc and is promised help with his attacker. Herc accidentally reveals Randy as his source while interrogating Kevin, too busy with him to help Bubbles when he picks a fight with the man. Carcetti learns that city council president Nerese Campbell was set up to be mayor and promises her the position if he runs for governor. He fails to bribe Burrell into retirement with a raise and promotes Valchek and Daniels for their loyalty, giving the latter control of major crimes. Omar is released and Andre goes to Joe for help, but is handed to Marlo and killed. Namond's crew is confronted in their new territory by Carver, who promises to arrest them next time. Randy asks Prez to buy candy online for him so he can upsell it; Prez agrees if Randy pays him back with clean money. Randy uses his new probability skills to gamble and gives Prez the winnings. Donnelly orders teachers to prep their classes for standardized tests, which Prez recognizes as a ploy to raise test scores and refuses. Namond and his classmates win a model-building challenge and Colvin takes them for a steak dinner, where they are ill at ease in the lavish atmosphere. Uncomfortable talking to Prez, Cutty or any other adult, Michael goes to Marlo about Devar.
47	10	"Misgivings"	Ernest Dickerson	Story by : Ed Burns & Eric Overmyer; Teleplay by : Eric Overmyer	November 19, 2006
Epigraph: "World goin' one way, people another." -Poot Young car thief "Donut" escapes from abusive officer Eddie Walker, but is later caught and beaten. Carver arrests Namond, who is allowed to stay the night with Colvin, impressing him and his wife with his manners. Colvin's class is forced to teach test prep and the assistant superintendent gets a bad impression when she observes them. After failing to scam Carcetti by funding Burrell's raise, Davis asks Campbell to hold off on giving it so Burrell has time to redeem himself. Burrell orders arrests for minor infractions to inflate stats, which McNulty is upset with. Elena (Note: McNulty's ex-wife, first seen in "Old Cases".) is impressed with his turnaround and congratulates him. Daniels informs Carcetti of the arrests, leaving him pleased with him and angry at Rawls for not alerting him. Herc again misses Bubbles's call for help while meeting with Marimow about the camera, so Bubbles takes revenge by tricking him into arresting a minister. Marlo has Kevin killed upon learning that he involved Randy in Lex's murder, and spreads word that Randy talked to the police. Stalking Marlo, Omar is confused when he sees him meeting with Slim Charles. (Note: A former Barksdale lieutenant that now works under Joe, first seen in "Time After Time".) When Michael implies that Devar molested him, Chris visits Devar and brutally beats him to death.
48	11	"A New Day"	Brad Anderson	Story by : David Simon & Ed Burns; Teleplay by : Ed Burns	November 26, 2006
Epigraph: "You play in dirt, you get dirty." -McNulty The boys corner and rob Walker. Omar stalks Charles and discovers the existence of the Co-Op, pressing Joe into helping him attack Marlo. Sherrod returns to Bubbles and they are robbed by the man. Donnelly plans to move several students, including Dukie, to high school early. The school board shuts down Colvin's class without the backing of City Hall. Randy is rescued by Prez after being attacked and Carver assigns men to guard his house. Daniels is ordered to take care of Herc when the minister complains, but when he lets him off easy, Burrell advises Carcetti to find a reason to fire Herc. Carcetti pledges to focus on community-based policing and fire those who prioritize stats, only to learn that the school systems are $54 million over budget. Daniels gives Freamon authority over Marimow. Herc mentions the nail gun while talking to Freamon, who learns from Prez where Randy lured Lex. He goes there and notices newer nails on a nearby vacant, realizing Lex is inside.
49	12	"That's Got His Own"	Joe Chappelle	Story by : Ed Burns & George Pelecanos; Teleplay by : George Pelecanos	December 3, 2006
Epigraph: "That all there is to it?" -Bubbles Namond discovers his lieutenant Kenard lied about their stash being stolen, but is unable to beat him and is horrified when Michael does. He picks a fight with Michael at the gym and tearfully tells Cutty that he does not want to be like Wee-Bey. Dukie moves in with Michael when his family is evicted. Cutty tries to stop Michael from working for Marlo but is shot by lieutenant Monk Metcalf. Omar steals Marlo's drugs from Cheese with Joe's information. Bubbles laces a vial of heroin with cyanide in hopes of the man stealing and using it, but Sherrod takes it instead and dies. IA detectives question Herc about the camera. Freamon finds more vacant tombs but is ordered by Jay Landsman (Note: A BPD homicide sergeant, first seen in "The Target".) to stop and protect homicide's clearance rate. He goes to Daniels, who suggests to Rawls that pulling the bodies now will shift the blame to Royce. Impressed by the idea, Rawls presents it to Carcetti as his own, who authorizes it. Carcetti begs the Republican governor for budget help but realizes he is being set up to look bad if he takes it and then runs against him. Carver's men are lured away and Randy's house is set on fire, badly burning his foster mother.
50	13	"Final Grades"	Ernest Dickerson	Story by : David Simon & Ed Burns; Teleplay by : David Simon	December 10, 2006
Epigraph: "If animal trapped call 410-844-6286" -Baltimore, traditional Bubbles turns himself in and attempts suicide but is rescued by Landsman, who sends him to rehab. Freamon discovers multiple bodies and a suspended Herc confirms that the nails in the vacants match Snoop's gun. Carcetti uses the bodies to distract from the budget on advice from chief of staff Michael Steintorf, insisting to a disappointed Wilson that he can solve both problems as governor. Colvin fails to convince Steintorf to keep the class. Prez's students attempt the test in earnest and he is pleased when a third of them perform adequately. Dukie drops out of high school and starts working for Marlo. McNulty convinces Bodie to inform on Marlo after Kevin's body is found, but Monk spots them and Bodie is killed in a shootout with the Stanfields. Marlo gives Bodie's territory to Michael, who kills a rival dealer. McNulty has Daniels add him back to major crimes. Joe buys back his upsold drugs to keep Cheese safe from Marlo, and Omar retires with the money. Marlo has Vondas followed after they meet. Unable to adopt Randy or find another home, Carver is forced to give him to social services. Randy forgives him for his failure and is beaten by other boys in his group home. A recovering Cutty sets up a meeting between Colvin and Wee-Bey, where Colvin is allowed to adopt Namond. As Namond starts his new school, Donut passes by in a stolen car and the two acknowledge each other before he drives off. The episode is dedicated to Robert F. Colesberry, the show's co-creator and Ray Cole's actor, who died between the second and third season.
