= The Wire season 1 =

The Wire
- Season 1
- DVD cover
- Starring: Dominic West; John Doman; Idris Elba; Frankie R. Faison; Larry Gilliard Jr.; Wood Harris; Deirdre Lovejoy; Wendell Pierce; Lance Reddick; Andre Royo; Sonja Sohn
- No. of episodes: 13

Release
- Original network: HBO
- Original release: June 2 – September 8, 2002

Season chronology
- Next → Season 2

The first season of the television series The Wire commenced airing on Sunday, June 2, 2002, at 10:00 pm ET in the United States and concluded on September 8, 2002. The 13 episodes tell the story from the points of view of both the drug-dealing Barksdale organization and the investigating police detail.

The season was released on DVD as a five-disc boxed set under the title of The Wire: The Complete First Season on October 12, 2004, by HBO Video.

== Production ==
=== Crew ===
David Simon is the series' creator and head writer, showrunner and executive producer. Alongside Simon, many of the creative team behind The Wire are alumni of Homicide and Emmy-winning miniseries The Corner. The Corner veteran, Robert F. Colesberry, was also executive producer. Colesberry is credited by the rest of the creative team as having a large creative role for a producer, and Simon credits him for achieving the show's realistic visual feel. He also had a small recurring role as Detective Ray Cole. Colesberry's wife Karen L. Thorson joined him on the production staff. A third producer on The Corner, Nina Kostroff Noble, also stayed with the production staff for The Wire rounding out the initial four-person team.

Stories for the show were often co-written by Ed Burns, a former Baltimore Police Department homicide detective and public school teacher who worked with Simon on other projects including The Corner. The writing staff included acclaimed crime fiction novelist George P. Pelecanos from Washington, D.C. Pelecanos has commented that he was attracted to the project because of the opportunity to work with Simon. Staff writer Rafael Alvarez was a colleague of Simon's from The Sun and a Baltimore native with working experience in the port area. Another city native and independent filmmaker, Joy Lusco Kecken, joined the writing staff and served as the script coordinator. David H. Melnick and Shamit Choksey complete the writing staff.

Homicide alumnus Clark Johnson, who directed several acclaimed episodes of The Shield, directed the pilot, the second episode, and the fifth episode (Johnson later had a starring role in the fifth season). Clement Virgo directed two episodes. Single episode directors included Ed Bianchi, Joe Chappelle, Gloria Muzio, Milčo Mančevski, Brad Anderson and Steve Shill. The season finale was directed by Tim Van Patten, an Emmy winner who worked on every season of The Sopranos. The directing was praised by critics for its uncomplicated and subtle style.

=== Cast ===
The major characters of the first season were divided between those on the side of the law and those involved in drug-related crime. The starring cast comprised characters from both groups. The investigating detail was launched by the actions of Detective Jimmy McNulty (Dominic West), whose insubordinate tendencies and personal problems overshadowed his ability. The detail was led by Lieutenant Cedric Daniels (Lance Reddick), who faced challenges balancing his career aspirations with his desire to produce a good case. Kima Greggs (Sonja Sohn) was a capable lead detective who faced jealousy from colleagues and worry about the dangers of her job from her domestic partner. Her investigative work was helped by her confidential informant, a drug addict known as Bubbles (Andre Royo).

These investigators were overseen by two commanding officers more concerned with politics and their own careers than with the case, Major William Rawls (John Doman) and Deputy Commissioner Ervin Burrell (Frankie Faison). Assistant state's attorney Rhonda Pearlman (Deirdre Lovejoy) acted as the legal liaison between the detail and the courthouse and also had a casual relationship with McNulty. In the homicide division, Bunk Moreland (Wendell Pierce) was a gifted, dry-witted detective partnered with McNulty.

On the other side of the investigation was Avon Barksdale's drug empire. The driven, ruthless Barksdale (Wood Harris) was aided by business-minded Stringer Bell (Idris Elba). Avon's nephew D'Angelo Barksdale (Larry Gilliard Jr.) ran some of his uncle's territory, but also possessed a guilty conscience.

The first season featured several significant characters in recurring roles. Like Detective Greggs, partners Thomas "Herc" Hauk (Domenick Lombardozzi) and Ellis Carver (Seth Gilliam) were reassigned to the detail from the narcotics unit. The duo's initially violent nature was eventually subdued as they proved useful in grunt work, and sometimes served as comic relief for the audience. Rounding out the temporary unit were detectives Leander Sydnor (Corey Parker Robinson), Lester Freamon (Clarke Peters) and Roland "Prez" Pryzbylewski (Jim True-Frost). Sydnor was a rookie detective with a reputation for solid undercover work. Though not initially important players in the operation, Freamon proved a quietly capable investigator with a knack for noticing tiny but important details, and Prez, while a liability on the street, turned out to be a natural at his desk job. McNulty and Bunk served in a homicide unit squad led by Sergeant Jay Landsman (Delaney Williams), the jovial squad commander. Peter Gerety had a recurring role as Judge Phelan, the official who started the case moving.

There were also several recurring characters in the Barksdale Organization. Loyal Wee-Bey Brice (Hassan Johnson) was responsible for multiple homicides carried out on Avon's orders. Working under D'Angelo were Poot Carr (Tray Chaney), Bodie Broadus (J. D. Williams), and Wallace (Michael B. Jordan), all street-level drug dealers. Wallace was an intelligent but naïve youth trapped in the drug trade, Bodie a violent and determined young dealer, and Poot a lascivious young man happy to follow rather than lead. Omar Little (Michael K. Williams), a notorious Baltimore stick-up man robbing drug dealers for a living, was a frequent thorn in the side of the Barksdale clan.

==== Main cast ====
- Dominic West as James "Jimmy" McNulty (13 episodes), an intelligent but egotistical BPD homicide detective whose defiant attitude inadvertently creates an investigation into a drug organization.
- John Doman as William Rawls (8 episodes), a BPD major who loathes McNulty's behavior.
- Idris Elba as Russell "Stringer" Bell (13 episodes), Avon's intelligent and business-minded underboss.
- Frankie Faison as Ervin Burrell (11 episodes), the BPD's deputy commissioner who tends to prioritize the department's image over solving important cases.
- Lawrence Gilliard Jr. as D'Angelo Barksdale (13 episodes), Avon's sensitive nephew and a lieutenant in the Barksdale Organization.
- Wood Harris as Avon Barksdale (12 episodes), a drug kingpin and the most powerful criminal force in West Baltimore.
- Deirdre Lovejoy as Rhonda Pearlman (9 episodes), an assistant state's attorney who both helps McNulty and has frequent trysts with him.
- Wendell Pierce as William "Bunk" Moreland (12 episodes), McNulty's good-natured, equally intelligent partner.
- Lance Reddick as Cedric Daniels (13 episodes), the lieutenant of the BPD's narcotics unit who is tasked with heading the investigation into the Barksdale Organization.
- Andre Royo as Reginald "Bubbles" Cousins (11 episodes), a friendly heroin addict who acts as a civilian informant for Greggs.
- Sonja Sohn as Shakima "Kima" Greggs (12 episodes), a BPD narcotics detective assigned to work under Daniels.

== Reception ==
The first season received mostly positive reviews from critics, holding a 79/100 on Metacritic. On Rotten Tomatoes, the season has an approval rating of 85% with an average score of 9.5/10 based on 34 reviews. The website's critical consensus reads, "Though it takes its time getting started, The Wire is worth the wait, spinning a connective web of characters and delivering no-holds-barred commentary on some of America's unsettling societal problems."

Some called it superior to HBO's better-known "flagship" drama series such as The Sopranos and Six Feet Under. One reviewer felt that the show was partially a retread of themes from HBO and David Simon's earlier works but still valuable viewing, describing the series as particularly resonant because of parallels between the war on terror and the war on drugs. Another review postulated that the series might suffer because of its reliance on profanity and slowly drawn-out plot, but was largely positive about the show's characters and intrigue. TIME named the first season as the best TV show of 2002 in their Top 10 Everything 2002.

Despite the critical acclaim, The Wire received poor Nielsen ratings, which Simon attributed to the complexity of the plot, a poor time slot, heavy use of esoteric slang (particularly among the gangster characters), and a predominantly black cast. Critics felt the show was testing the attention span of its audience and felt that it was mistimed in the wake of the launch of the successful crime drama The Shield on FX. However, anticipation for a release of the first season on DVD was high at Entertainment Weekly.

=== Awards and nominations ===
19th TCA Awards

- Nomination for Program of the Year
- Nomination for Outstanding Achievement in Drama
- Nomination for Outstanding New Program of the Year

== Episodes ==
No. overall	No. in season	Title	Directed by	Written by	Original release date	U.S. viewers (millions)
1	1	"The Target"	Clark Johnson	Story by : David Simon & Ed Burns; Teleplay by : David Simon	June 2, 2002	3.70
Epigraph: "...when it's not your turn." -McNulty At the homicide trial of West Baltimore drug kingpin Avon Barksdale's nephew D'Angelo, underboss Russell "Stringer" Bell intimidates witness Nakeesha Lyles into changing her story, resulting in an acquittal. Homicide detective Jimmy McNulty breaks chain of command by complaining about the BPD's failure to investigate Avon to judge Daniel Phelan, who insists to deputy commissioner Ervin Burrell that something be done. Sergeant Jay Landsman warns McNulty that his behavior may get him reassigned, who admits he gets seasick and dreads the marine unit. Burrell tasks lieutenant Cedric Daniels with creating a detail that will passively investigate Avon. Heroin addict Johnny Weeks is beaten for trying to scam Barksdale dealers, prompting his friend Reginald "Bubbles" Cousins, an informant for detective Kima Greggs, to give her information on them. D'Angelo is demoted to heading the low-rise "Pit" projects, where he finds the body of William Gant, the other murder witness.
2	2	"The Detail"	Clark Johnson	Story by : David Simon & Ed Burns; Teleplay by : David Simon	June 9, 2002	2.80
Epigraph: "You cannot lose, if you do not play." -Marla Daniels Believing the Barksdales killed Gant, McNulty has Phelan put him on the case. He and his partner William "Bunk" Moreland detain D'Angelo and manipulate him into signing a confession, but his attorney Maurice Levy pulls him before he can incriminate himself. Bubbles covertly marks Barksdale men by selling them hats and they are photographed by the detail. Burrell gives Daniels useless officers to fill the rest of the detail, including Roland "Prez" Pryzbylewski, who drunkenly attacks teenage dealer Kevin Johnston. Daniels backs Prez, which his wife Marla admonishes him about. He later learns that Johnston lost vision in one eye.
3	3	"The Buys"	Peter Medak	Story by : David Simon & Ed Burns; Teleplay by : David Simon	June 16, 2002	N/A
Epigraph: "The king stay the king." -D'Angelo Detective Leander Sydnor goes undercover in the Pit with Bubbles and finds that money and drugs are never held by the higher-ups. Prez's father-in-law, Major Stan Valchek, saves his job by agreeing to keep him off the street. Daniels orders a raid on the Pit, unaware that robber Omar Little has emptied it, and dealer Marvin Browning is arrested while detective Lester Freamon notes a phone number written on a wall. D'Angelo's man Preston "Bodie" Broadus punches an officer and is beaten. When the detail realizes they have no pictures of Avon Barksdale, Freamon finds a poster from Avon's old boxing career. McNulty learns from assistant state's attorney and frequent fling Rhonda Pearlman that he needs to prove he is out of options to clone a pager, and hears from his FBI contact Terrance Fitzhugh that Daniels was investigated in the past for pocketing drug money.
4	4	"Old Cases"	Clement Virgo	Story by : David Simon & Ed Burns; Teleplay by : David Simon	June 23, 2002	2.91
Epigraph: "Thin line 'tween heaven and here." -Bubbles Landsman makes a deal with major William Rawls that McNulty can return to the homicide unit with a clean slate if the detail wraps soon. Bodie easily escapes from the facility he is held in and challenges D'Angelo upon his return, who boasts about killing Avon's ex-girlfriend Deirdre Kresson for him, an old case which McNulty and Bunk investigate and find a previously unnoticed shell casing. Browning chooses jail over flipping on the Barksdales. Avon puts out a bounty on Omar's crew while Stringer wonders if the Pit has a mole. As McNulty explains the requirements for a clone to the detail, Freamon reveals that the number he saw is likely D'Angelo's. McNulty turns up to Greggs's apartment drunk, who explains that their inability to monitor their targets inside buildings qualifies them for a clone.
5	5	"The Pager"	Clark Johnson	Story by : David Simon & Ed Burns; Teleplay by : Ed Burns	June 30, 2002	2.97
Epigraph: "...a little slow, a little late." -Avon Barksdale Avon shows D'Angelo his brother, left vegetative after being shot in the head, and encourages D'Angelo to use the fear of ending up like him to work harder. Stringer recommends that D'Angelo withhold pay from his dealers to flush out a rat. He takes his girlfriend Donette to a ritzy steakhouse dinner, but is uncomfortable in the lavish atmosphere. A ballistics test connects the casing to two previous murders. Detectives Ellis Carver and Thomas "Herc" Hauk arrest Bodie and beat him when he insults them, but warm to him over a game of pool. Phelan approves the clone and the detail discovers that the Barksdales only send numerical codes, though Prez realizes through his love of puzzles that they are sending jumbled phone numbers. McNulty and Greggs track down Omar to inform him that one of his men was killed, and he reveals that Barksdale soldier Marquis "Bird" Hilton killed Gant. Pit boys Wallace and Malik "Poot" Carr spot Omar's boyfriend Brandon Wright and notify D'Angelo.
6	6	"The Wire"	Ed Bianchi	Story by : David Simon & Ed Burns; Teleplay by : David Simon	July 7, 2002	2.98
Epigraph: "...and all the pieces matter." -Freamon Wallace is horrified to find Brandon's mutilated body the next day. D'Angelo pardons a pair of dealers that have been stealing due to their withheld pay and tells Stringer his crew is clean. Johnny is arrested while buying drugs. Levy gets Bodie released from custody. Rawls tries to force Bunk to investigate murders connected to Avon, so Daniels has Burrell override him to prevent Avon from being alerted of the detail. Wiretaps are installed in payphones on Avon's territory. After McNulty shows Omar Brandon's body, he agrees to testify about Gant's murder.
7	7	"One Arrest"	Joe Chappelle	Story by : David Simon & Ed Burns; Teleplay by : Rafael Alvarez	July 21, 2002	4.12
Epigraph: "A man must have a code." -Bunk As the detail learns the Barksdales' routines, they arrest Johnston when he picks up drugs from enforcer Anton "Stinkum" Artis. Knowing there is a reason Stinkum was untouched, Avon and Stringer order Pit trade to halt and the phones in it to be destroyed. Wendell "Orlando" Blocker, the owner of Avon's strip club front, asks D'Angelo for help selling cocaine. To get Johnny out of trouble, Greggs makes him to go to NA, where Bubbles is moved by a speaker named Walon. Bird is arrested after another witness corroborates that he killed Gant and a ballistics test identifies his gun. Rawls orders detective Michael Santangelo to either solve an open case or give him dirt on McNulty to protect his job, and McNulty gets information from Omar that solves a case for him. A grateful Santangelo warns McNulty that Rawls is after him.
8	8	"Lessons"	Gloria Muzio	Story by : David Simon & Ed Burns; Teleplay by : David Simon	July 28, 2002	3.31
Epigraph: "Come at the king, you best not miss." -Omar McNulty spots Stringer in public and has his sons write down his license plate. He follows him and discovers he studies economics at BCCC. After learning about a money drop on the wire, the detail pulls over senator Clay Davis's driver Damien Price and finds money in the car. Phelan stops Burrell from subsequently shutting down the detail by threatening to charge him with contempt. Poot notices Wallace's withdrawn behavior and alerts D'Angelo, who passes Orlando's request to Avon and is denied. Stinkum is promoted and thrown a party, where a stripper dies of an overdose. D'Angelo lies when her coworker and his side girlfriend Shardene Innes asks after her. Omar ambushes Stinkum and enforcer Roland "Wee-Bey" Brice, killing the former. Stringer suggests luring him out with a false truce. The detail learns of Omar's crime but do nothing to keep him as a viable witness. A guilty Bunk and McNulty go drinking, and Bunk cheats on his wife, forcing McNulty to take him in for the night.
9	9	"Game Day"	Milčo Mančevski	Story by : David Simon & Ed Burns; Teleplay by : David H. Melnick & Shamit Choksey	August 4, 2002	3.42
Epigraph: "Maybe we won." -Herc Avon attends the annual basketball game between Baltimore's East and West sides, which his team loses. Herc and Carver come across the game and realize he is there, identifying him when Sydnor brings the boxing poster. They try to follow him as he leaves, but he notices and outmaneuvers them. Freamon pulls records from City Hall that identify Avon's fronts and confirm that he donated to several politicians. He and Greggs show Shardene the stripper's corpse after finding it in a dumpster, convincing her to help the detail. The detail overhears Poot talking on the phone about Wallace's mental state. Bubbles steals drugs from the Barksdales but realizes they are actually baking soda. He convinces his mistrustful sister Rae to let him move into her basement. Omar buys Avon's pager code from East side leader "Proposition" Joe Stewart and lures him to a spot to kill him. Wee-Bey arrives just in time to save Avon and shoot Omar, who flees.
10	10	"The Cost"	Brad Anderson	Story by : David Simon & Ed Burns; Teleplay by : David Simon	August 11, 2002	4.15
Epigraph: "And then he dropped the bracelets..." -Greggs Sober for three days, Bubbles asks Greggs for help getting a place. As Avon isolates himself, Stringer sets up a meeting with Omar, who realizes it is a trap and leaves town. Phelan pulls support from the detail after losing his spot on the mayor's re-election ticket. The detail brings in Wallace, who identifies several men associated with Brandon's murder, and they send him to his grandmother for protection. Orlando is arrested buying drugs and is noticed by Browning in prison, who alerts Avon. With Burrell pressuring him to make progress, Daniels sends Orlando and Greggs to buy from a stash identified by the detail, but they are shot up by Wee-Bey and enforcer Wintell "Little Man" Royce, and Orlando is killed.
11	11	"The Hunt"	Steve Shill	Story by : David Simon & Ed Burns; Teleplay by : Joy Lusco	August 18, 2002	3.43
Epigraph: "Dope on the damn table." -Daniels Greggs lies in critical condition and Bubbles is picked up after trying to page her. McNulty, unaware of his attempt to get sober, sends him to buy drugs and find the shooters. He names Savino Bratton, who rode shotgun with Orlando and Greggs to the buy. McNulty threatens to pull Levy's finances if he does not bring Savino in, who takes prison over informing. Wee-Bey kills Little Man on Stringer's orders and takes D'Angelo to an unknown location, leaving him terrified that he is about to be killed, though he is actually being asked to take care of Wee-Bey's apartment while he is in hiding. Burrell orders raids that Daniels tries to prevent to keep the Barksdales unaware of the wire, but Phelan refuses to help after being put back with the mayor. When Daniels tries to withhold locations from his superiors, they find out and he realizes there is a mole in the detail. As the raids occur, an unaware Prez misses a call where Wallace resolves to come back to Baltimore.
12	12	"Cleaning Up"	Clement Virgo	Story by : David Simon & Ed Burns; Teleplay by : George Pelecanos	September 1, 2002	3.66
Epigraph: "This is me, yo, right here." -Wallace Daniels convinces McNulty to get over his guilt about Greggs while Herc passes his sergeant's exam with a higher score than Carver. Daniels accuses Davis of corruption in a meeting between them and Burrell, who tries to threaten an unafraid Daniels with his FBI file. Lyles is killed to protect the Barksdales and Stringer orders Wallace's death due to the risk he poses, which Poot and Bodie reluctantly carry out. As the Barksdales stop using phones entirely, Shardene, now in a relationship with Freamon, maps out the dimensions of Orlando's, giving the detail the position they need to install a camera in the neighboring building. They hear Avon ordering D'Angelo to pick up their next package and fit his car with a tracker. He is arrested and McNulty reveals that Wallace is dead, which he does not believe until Stringer refuses to answer his questions. He rejects Levy's counsel while Avon is arrested.
13	13	"Sentencing"	Tim Van Patten	David Simon & Ed Burns	September 8, 2002	3.77
Epigraph: "all in the game..." -Traditional West Baltimore Greggs wakes and sends Bubbles his money, who spends it on heroin. McNulty and Daniels take the case to the FBI to avoid Burrell's tampering. When they explain that the Barksdales are working with politicians to gentrify neighborhoods for profit, McNulty erupts when the agents plan to work with Avon and Stringer instead of being more concerned with helping victims. He interviews D'Angelo, who gives up Wee-Bey and implicates him as Kresson's true killer. He offers to give up everything he has on Avon if he can be relocated, but his mother Brianna visits him and convinces him to stay quiet. The Barksdales plead guilty on advice from Levy and Stringer takes over for Avon, setting up in a funeral home. Wee-Bey is arrested and confesses to several murders, some of which he did not commit. Carver is promoted to sergeant over Herc and Daniels realizes he is the leak. McNulty's outburst is reported to Burrell, who passes Daniels over for a promotion, while Rawls, after talking to Landsman, sends McNulty to the marine unit, promotes Freamon to homicide, and demotes Santangelo. In New York, Omar robs a dealer and tells him it is "all in the game."
