= That's Got His Own =

- The Wire episode
- Episode no.: Season 4 Episode 12
- Directed by: Joe Chappelle
- Story by: Ed Burns; George Pelecanos
- Teleplay by: George Pelecanos
- Original air date: December 3, 2006
- Running time: 58 minutes

Episode chronology
← Previous "A New Day"	Next → "Final Grades"

"That's Got His Own" is the 12th episode of the fourth season of the HBO original series The Wire. Written by George Pelecanos from a story by Ed Burns & George Pelecanos, and directed by Joe Chappelle, it originally aired on December 3, 2006.

== Plot ==
=== Michael ===
Michael Lee flees from Stanfield enforcers Chris Partlow and Snoop, who are chasing him with guns drawn. He hides in an abandoned warehouse and surprises them. He tags both of them with what turns out to be paintballs and they are impressed at his progress. Chris asks him to explain the rationale behind his targeting and Michael explains that at a distance you aim low because of the possibility of a vest and at close range you aim for the head. Snoop is impressed, commenting that Michael is "learning."

=== School ===
Howard "Bunny" Colvin meets with his friend the Deacon to discuss the soon-to-be-axed special class program. Colvin explains that the school board is afraid to try anything with the current budget concerns. The Deacon offers to put him in touch with State Delegate Odell Watkins. The Deacon meets with Watkins as promised. Watkins recognizes Colvin's name from the Hamsterdam experiment and the Deacon ushers him in.

Mr. Pryzbylewski visits Randy Wagstaff at home with his foster mother, Miss Anna. Randy is still being kept at home because he is believed to be in danger as word has been spreading that he was working with the police. Prez delivers Randy's schoolwork and tells Miss Anna that he hopes the problem will not continue for much longer. She confides that they are thinking of switching schools to escape further difficulties. As he leaves, Prez notices an unmarked but conspicuous police car waiting further down the block.

In the morning, Prez meets with Assistant Principal Marcia Donnelly and tries to convince her that Duquan "Dukie" Weems is not ready for high school. She tells him that she has noticed the effort he has put into helping Dukie, but that he must not get too close to his students since they have to move on, and there are plenty more students coming into the system.

With the statewide exam closing in, both the special class and the normal classes are practicing test questions. Prez's class remains disruptive, but he is able to focus them on the material eventually. The special class is more resistant. Zenobia Dawson points out that she does not like answering questions about getting an allowance from a father when she has neither. Namond Brice tells the teacher that he feels cheated because his class is now the same as the other classes. Colvin and Dr. David Parenti share a concern that the test material does not speak to the students at all.

After class, Dukie confesses to Prez his own misgivings about moving up to high school. Prez tries to reassure him that he is ready and that he is welcome if he needs to come back at any time. Dukie walks home with Michael and continues to worry about going to high school. They find that Dukie and his family have been evicted, again. Michael offers Dukie a place to stay with him and his brother. Dukie returns for his last day at Edward Tilghman Middle School, where he wraps up work on a special assignment. As the final bell rings he looks dejected.

=== Major Crimes ===
Lester Freamon continues to search the area where he found the body of Curtis "Lex" Anderson in a vacant house. He has identified the type of nail used to seal the house as being indicative of further houses where bodies will be found, as H.C.D. uses screws to seal the vacant houses. Sergeant Jay Landsman arrives and orders Freamon to stop opening vacant houses because finding John Does at this stage in the year will destroy the homicide unit's clearance rate. Freamon is enraged and his partner Bunk Moreland tries to calm him.

Freamon's mood is lifted slightly when he returns to the detail office to watch Lieutenant Charles Marimow's departure. Thomas "Herc" Hauk is overjoyed to see the back of the lieutenant, telling the other detectives that Marimow had planned to ruin his career, but instead Marimow was the one forced out of the unit. Freamon asks Detective Sydnor to restart surveillance of Stanfield's people, and dispatches Detective Dozerman to city hall to look at high-value property sales and to check for luxury car purchases. He asks Herc to begin work on requisitioning back their wiretap equipment while Freamon will be at the missing persons department to search for Stanfield murder targets. Herc pulls Freamon to one side and asks if he can give the direction as he is the sergeant; Freamon acknowledges the question but does not respond.

Later, Lieutenant Asher returns to the unit and asks what the brass is thinking after having transferred him out just a few months ago. When Asher enters his office, Herc asks Freamon who he is and Freamon tells him that, ironically, he is one of the most effective supervisors in the department (due to his lack of oversight).

Freamon meets with CID commander Cedric Daniels and Assistant State's Attorney Pearlman. He makes a case that they should be searching other vacant houses for further bodies. Like Landsman, Daniels is concerned about the murder rate. Pearlman asks what other work they are doing on Stanfield and whether there are links between Stanfield and the missing persons that Freamon has selected. He explains that there are links in some cases and presents his strategy for following the money and resurrecting the wiretaps. Pearlman leaves the decision to Daniels, who tells Freamon that he will take it to the command staff.

Daniels meets with Deputy Commissioner Rawls to explain Freamon's theory, believing Freamon is right. Daniels suggests that pulling the bodies before the end of the year makes the poor statistics attributable to Royce's administration. Rawls is impressed with the idea and further realizes that Daniels is a threat to his hopes of becoming commissioner. He orders Daniels to keep the suggestion to himself. Rawls meets with Mayor Carcetti and tells him about Freamon's discovery. Rawls offers Daniels's suggestion as his own and Carcetti chastises him for thinking of stats, but still encourages him to uncover the bodies before the new year.

Freamon discusses the problem in a bar with Bunk and Jimmy McNulty. Bunk tries to steer the conversation away from the bodies, but Freamon will not be diverted. He bets that he can open any row house with matching nails and find a body and Bunk accepts the wager. As McNulty goes to leave, Bunk tries to convince him to get drunk with them, but McNulty resists. The trio does not take long to find another one of Marlo's bodies. McNulty suggests calling the crime lab. Freamon tells McNulty that he is not allowed to discover any bodies without the go-ahead from his superiors and, when that happens, McNulty will miss out on the investigation. McNulty questions if command will ever give the go-ahead and Freamon tells him that "it's a new day" with Daniels in command of CID.

Freamon meets with Herc and Sydnor the next morning. He is dismayed to learn that none of Stanfield's people are using phones and comments that if the wiretaps had been left running two months ago they would not be facing these problems now. Two detectives arrive from the Internal Investigations Division. They ask Herc if he remembers borrowing the camera from ISD and that they need a statement regarding the camera and some of his confidential informant paperwork. They request Sydnor and Dozerman as well, but Herc tells the detectives that he is solely responsible.

Freamon receives the go-ahead from Daniels along with an offer for further manpower: two CID officers of his choosing. Freamon first approaches Kima Greggs, but then decides not to ask her when she tells him she is enjoying the homicide division.

=== Politics ===
Mayor Carcetti holds a meeting to discuss the school budget deficit. Nerese Campbell and Andy Krawczyk, the school board president, both refuse to take responsibility. Michael Steintorf, the new chief of staff, suggests that the solution is to scale back their budget in all other areas, but Carcetti refuses to break the promises he had campaigned on and Campbell tells him that the only alternative is to beg the Republican governor for financial support.

In Annapolis, Carcetti and Wilson are waiting on a staircase for the governor for over an hour. Wilson shows Carcetti an article, written by Fletcher, quoting the governor about the school's financial problems, saying that the blame falls on a lack of local oversight. Carcetti has just decided to leave, when he's told by an assistant that the governor is now ready for them. Carcetti meets with his staff to discuss the governor's offer: more money in exchange for greater state control of the city's schools. Campbell tells Carcetti that the governor is protecting himself for the 2008 gubernatorial election by making Carcetti look bad for accepting the money. The budget advisor encourages Carcetti to take the money regardless. Wilson agrees and Steintorf disagrees. Campbell refuses to offer an opinion and tells Carcetti she is glad she is not in his position and will criticize him either way.

=== Western District ===
Kenard arrives at Namond's corner late for work and finds Namond getting his hair braided. Kenard asks Namond for a private word and tells him that their stash has been stolen from his basement. He claims that the door was kicked in by the police and that someone must have given away the location. Namond accepts his excuse and the assurance that Kenard will try to find the informant.

Namond discusses his problem with Michael. Michael insists that Kenard must have stolen the stash for himself and tells Namond that he should check the door to prove Kenard's story false and confront him with more than words. On the way home from school, Namond asks Michael to accompany him when he confronts Kenard. Namond tells his mother that he suspects Kenard took the stash. She furiously insists that Kenard needs to feel "some pain" for his actions. When Namond protests, she strikes him, and he storms out.

Namond confronts Kenard and tells him that he knows he stole the package. However, Kenard remains unafraid of Namond and verbally taunts him. Annoyed, Michael eventually steps in and brutally beats Kenard. Namond is too shocked to recover his package and runs away from the scene.

Sergeant Carver visits Randy at home and tries to reassure Miss Jeffreys that the danger will soon pass. He tells her that they still have plainclothes officers watching the house.

Namond arrives at Cutty's gym and gets the cold shoulder from Michael. He provokes Michael into attacking him by picking on Dukie. Cutty intervenes, telling Michael to leave. Namond breaks down in tears.

Cutty calls Carver for help and they ask Namond what has happened between him and Michael. Namond also mentions the fact that he is forced to live up to his father's reputation, but he doesn't have the game in him. Cutty confesses to Carver that he is angry with himself for sending Michael away. Cutty visits Michael's mother and learns that he has moved out. Carver calls Colvin for help after Namond's mother refuses to pick him up.

Meanwhile, a false shooting is called in from Randy's street to lure away the police unit guarding his house. Two men approach Miss Anna's house and throw Molotov cocktails through the window.

Cutty tracks Michael down to a corner with "Monk" Metcalf. Monk orders Cutty away, but Cutty persists. Monk shoots Cutty twice in the leg, but Michael insists that he keep Cutty alive. Michael offers to stay with Cutty until the ambulance comes only to be told to go with his "people."

Carver visits the hospital and learns that Miss Anna is in a critical, but stable condition with third degree burns. Randy rejects Carver's attempts to console him. Carver promises Randy that he will be protected, but as Carver leaves, Randy taunts him, bitterly.

=== Bubbles ===
Bubbles visits the horses' yard to talk to the arabbers he sometimes works for. He asks for advice about how to deal with his tormentor. They have various suggestions for him, but settle on replacing drugs with sodium cyanide to poison the man. They tell him that a metal plating shop is an easy place to buy the chemical and that the only issue will be living with himself as the police will not question the death of an addict.

Having bought the necessary chemical, Bubbles prepares several vials of the stuff and then goes out to work. Sherrod arrives and Bubbles tells him that he is giving him his own stock and route. Bubbles warns him not to resist their tormentor if held up again. When Bubbles returns to the garage after a long day at work without incident he finds Sherrod's takings on the table.

Bubbles awakens the next day full of plans to make money. He is horrified to find that Sherrod has ingested some of the vials he prepared and then cannot rouse the boy. Bubbles weeps over Sherrod's dead body.

=== Omar ===
Omar Little and Renaldo follow Cheese to a meeting with Stanfield. Cheese's jocular manner is met with stony silence from Marlo, Chris, Snoop, O-Dog and Monk. Marlo pays Cheese more than was expected and then orders a bigger shipment of narcotics. Cheese cannot promise, but tells Marlo that he will discuss it with Proposition Joe. He gives Monk a burner phone and tells him that they will call when they have the drugs. Stanfield's people are newly dubious about using phones and Cheese reassures them that they do not have to answer the call; the call itself will serve as the signal that the meeting is ready.

Omar organizes a meeting at Butchie's bar to put a team together. Butchie offers him the men who helped Omar while in jail as muscle, but Omar declines, telling Butchie that he hopes to be more subtle. His old associate Kimmy arrives and receives a warm welcome. Omar and Renaldo follow Cheese while he prepares the delivery to Marlo. Proposition Joe calls Omar as promised; Omar does not take the call. Omar, Renaldo and Kimmy tail the van to the meeting place. Kimmy is dressed as a prostitute. Cheese and his associates prepare to load the shipment into the van. Kimmy approaches one of the guards and tries to distract him with the offer of sexual favors. Renaldo's people arrive posing as painters and block Cheese's van in. Omar demands that they open the truck. Cheese reports the theft to Proposition Joe who worries that the co-op will think that he is withholding the shipment for himself.

== Production ==
=== Title reference ===
The title is a lyric from a song co-written and made famous by Billie Holiday, "God Bless The Child". There is an exploration of literal or metaphorical parent-child relationships in this episode and their subsequent break-up: Namond is scared of his mother and cannot return home, Randy virtually loses his foster mother in the arson attack, Bubbles loses Sherrod and Prez is advised to have children of his own to replace the surrogate child that Dukie has become for him.

=== Epigraph ===
That all there is to it?

— Bubbles

Bubbles remarking on the apparent simplicity of murdering his tormentor. This also ties in with Michael's successful course training with Chris and Snoop, the firebombing of Randy's home (which subsequently causes him to go back into group home care), as well as the difficulty in Mayor Carcetti's handling of the citywide budget and later reaching out to Annapolis for assistance with the school budget deficit.

=== Credits ===
==== Starring cast ====
Although credited, Frankie Faison, Glynn Turman, and J. D. Williams do not appear in this episode.

==== Guest stars ====
- Jermaine Crawford as Duquan "Dukie" Weems
- Maestro Harrell as Randy Wagstaff
- Julito McCullum as Namond Brice
- Tristan Wilds as Michael Lee
- Gbenga Akinnagbe as Chris Partlow
- Neal Huff as Michael Steintorf
- Robert F. Chew as Proposition Joe
- Anwan Glover as Slim Charles
- Method Man as Melvin "Cheese" Wagstaff
- Benjamin Busch as Officer Anthony Colicchio
- Boris McGiver as Lieutenant Charles Marimow
- Delaney Williams as Sergeant Jay Landsman
- Marlyne Afflack as Nerese Campbell
- S. Robert Morgan as Butchie
- Ramón Rodríguez as Renaldo
- Shamika Cotton as Raylene Lee
- Stacie Davis as Miss Duquette
- Tootsie Duvall as Assistant Principal Marcia Donnelly
- Denise Hart as Miss Anna Jeffreys
- Robert L. Ehrlich, Jr. as Security Guard
- David Goodman as Budget Advisor
- Rick Otto as Detective Kenneth Dozerman
- Frederick Strother as State Delegate Odell Watkins
- Melvin Williams as The Deacon
- Nathan Corbett as Donut
- Thuliso Dingwall as Kenard
- Chynna Gray as Unknown
- Sandi McCree as De'Londa Brice
- Felicia Pearson as Felicia "Snoop" Pearson
- Davone Cooper as Darnell Tyson
- Taylor King as Zenobia Dawson
- Jeffrey Lorenzo as Karim Williams
- Rakiya Orange as Charlene Young
- Gene Terinoni as Lieutenant Jimmy Asher
- Devin Tweedy as Unknown
- Kelli R. Brown as Kimmy
- Dan DeLuca as Dr. David Parenti
- Yolanda Gaskins as School Board Representative
- Rashad Orange as Sherrod
- Richard Welchel as Unknown
- Michael Willis as Andy Krawczyk

The security guard who tells Carcetti and Wilson that the Governor is ready to see them is played by Robert Ehrlich, the real-life Governor of Maryland at the time the episode was filmed. The storyline of fictional mayor Tommy Carcetti seeking the governor's assistance with the school deficit has been noted as similar to real life Mayor Martin O'Malley's appeal for support in 2004. The show's creator, David Simon, has commented that the appearance was not meant to imply any favor in the O'Malley vs. Ehrlich electoral campaign. Simon stated that a similar cameo was offered to O'Malley, but he declined. The episode aired shortly after O'Malley defeated Ehrlich in the general election.

==== Uncredited appearances ====
- Kwame Patterson as Monk Metcalf
- Darrell Britt-Gibson as O-Dog
- Donnie Andrews as Donnie
- Derrick Purvey as Big Guy
- Carl Clemons as Cheese's muscle
- Unknown as Bubbles's friend 1
- Unknown as Bubbles's friend 2

=== First appearances ===
- Michael Steintorf: Carcetti's Chief of Staff who is primarily concerned with the Mayor's future bid for Governor.
