= Final Grades =

- The Wire episode
- Episode no.: Season 4 Episode 13
- Directed by: Ernest Dickerson
- Story by: David Simon; Ed Burns
- Teleplay by: David Simon
- Original air date: December 10, 2006
- Running time: 78 minutes

Episode chronology
← Previous "That's Got His Own"	Next → "More with Less"

"Final Grades" is the 13th and last episode of the fourth season of the HBO original series The Wire. Written by David Simon from a story by David Simon & Ed Burns and directed by Ernest Dickerson, it originally aired on December 10, 2006. With a running time of 78 minutes, it is the second longest episode of the whole series and received critical acclaim.

== Plot ==
=== Homicide ===
Sergeant Jay Landsman walks into the homicide unit office humming a carol. His Christmas spirit is rapidly dispelled when he sees several red names being added to the case board. He quizzes Detective Ed Norris about the board; Norris tells him that Lester Freamon is responsible, having received the go-ahead to search vacant houses for concealed bodies. Landsman is angry at the sudden drop in his squad clearance rate and calls Freamon a Hun, a Vandal and a Visigoth. Landsman next asks what Norris is working on and is dismayed to find out that he is also working a new case: that of a deliberate killing using poisoned narcotics. Landsman is somewhat forgiving when Norris tells him that he has the perpetrator in custody as he came in and voluntarily confessed to the crime.

Accompanied by Landsman, Norris returns to the interview room to discuss Bubbles' confession. Bubbles is distraught and is undergoing withdrawal. He vomits all over the detectives and they leave the room to clean up. When they return Bubbles has attempted to hang himself from the ceiling. The detectives cut him down.

Later, Landsman is pleased to learn that Bubbles survived. He spots Detective Crutchfield leaving the unit office and is downcast once again when he learns that Freamon has found yet another body. Landsman checks with the paramedics and then quizzes Bubbles about his actions and motives in confessing to the crime. Bubbles tells him the entire story behind Sherrod's death. Bubbles is filled with remorse and regret and pleads with Landsman to lock him up.

Landsman orders Norris to let Bubbles go. Norris worries about losing the clearance and about Bubbles's safety. Landsman tells him to send Bubbles to rehab. Later, Kima Greggs and Walon visit Bubbles at the rehab center. Walon comforts Bubbles, but Greggs cannot bring herself to go in.

=== Major Crimes ===
Freamon marshals his team as they search vacant houses in the Western District. They have uncovered nine bodies so far in clusters around certain blocks. Greggs is there from homicide. Freamon remarks to her that the scary part of the investigation is that they are only searching a single sector. He telephones Colonel Cedric Daniels, who is at a staging area set up in the gym of a disused school.

Daniels answers the call, leaving ASA Rhonda Pearlman alone to field questions from Deputy Commissioner William Rawls and Commissioner Ervin Burrell. She reports that forensics teams are attending each crime scene and they are recovering 9 mm bullet casings, vacuuming for hair and fiber and laser printing for footprints. Daniels returns and is asked to confirm that the bodies are linked to one organization. He tells Burrell that Marlo Stanfield's drug organization is their prime focus and is then asked what they have on Stanfield. He explains that Major Crimes was building a case against Stanfield until three months ago when their wiretaps were pulled by Lieutenant Marimow. Burrell offers Daniels whatever support he needs. Daniels tells Burrell that he needs the patrol division to begin searching for houses. Daniels leaves to begin organizing a citywide search.

Rawls remarks to Burrell that if Daniels manages to solve this case then he will be closer to the commissioner position. Burrell tells Rawls that Daniels is a long way from his "throne" and that he is too. He taunts Rawls by saying that he made his move against him too soon. Rawls admits to the mistake and Burrell warns him never to cross him again, following their confrontation earlier in the season.

Freamon receives word from Daniels and assigns Leander Sydnor and Kenneth Dozerman to introduce the specifics of the search to the patrol division. Greggs asks what she can do and Freamon asks her to raise Sergeant Thomas "Herc" Hauk, who is currently suspended from duty pending the results of an internal investigation. Greggs finds Herc drinking in the morning and reluctant to become involved while suspended. She goads him into accompanying her by questioning whether he is police or not. She takes him to the site of his recent traffic stop of Chris Partlow and Felicia "Snoop" Pearson, as he told Freamon that he fired a nail from their nail gun into the road. They find the mark but are unable to locate the nail. Herc spends the whole time questioning why IID is investigating him when Marimow has been transferred away and Daniels had already given him a mild punishment for the incident with the minister. Tired of Herc's complaints, Greggs asks what he did in order to reassure him that he will have an easier hearing. When Herc admits the falsified paperwork and stolen camera, Greggs and her partner Bunk Moreland shake their heads in disbelief. Herc experiences further dismay, concerned that he may lose more than just his sergeant's rank.

Each patrol officer is given orders to search his post for vacant houses sealed with non-HCD materials. They are instructed to report any such houses to their sector sergeant and told that they can enter, but upon finding a body, they are not to disturb the scene further.

Daniels convenes a meeting with the detectives. Bunk and Greggs report that Herc identified the nail gun as the same one used to nail the vacant houses shut, but that they were unable to recover the nail. Freamon suggests that their next move is to seize Chris's truck and take hair and blood samples from both Chris and Snoop. Pearlman interjects, telling the detectives that they do not have the probable cause for these actions. Bunk suggests using Randy Wagstaff as a witness because he is able to link Chris and Snoop to the death of Curtis "Lex" Anderson, but Freamon insists that Randy is simply a source. Bunk becomes impatient and says that he will provide the necessary probable cause within an hour. He visits Lex's mother and pressures her into speaking up. She states that she has heard that ‘Chris’ and a girl, possibly named ‘Loop’ or ‘Snoop’, were responsible.

With their warrant - obtained with the apparently decisive hearsay input of this second source - Greggs, Freamon and Bunk perform a stop-and-search of Chris and Snoop. Greggs finds the wiring for the hidden glove box compartment and discovers a pistol concealed within. The team arrests them for the weapons charge and immediately obtains a grand jury warrant for blood and hair samples.

Back at the staging area Daniels relays the ballistics report to Freamon. The guns found in the car are clean of prints and do not match to any shootings. Freamon suggests that a trace DNA match or a witness could break the case, but that they are probably facing a lengthy investigation. Freamon asks Daniels how he chose the staging area and learns that he once went to school there.

=== Omar Little ===
Omar Little and his crew divide up the spoils of their robbery. Kimmy is pleased with their success and tells Omar that she is going back into retirement. Omar's adviser, Butchie, asks how much of the shipment is left. Omar tells him that there is more than he could ever sell on his own. Butchie suggests selling it back to Proposition Joe for a profit; it is initially taken as a joke, but Renaldo and Omar begin to see the idea's potential.

Omar returns to his hideout, having met with Joe and received payment for their stolen shipment. He gives Butchie a percentage for himself and tells him that he will now act as his own bank. Omar leaves the shipment in a locked garage and calls Joe to advise him. As he leaves, Butchie warns Omar that the theft will have further repercussions.

=== New Day Co-Op ===
Proposition Joe hosts a meeting with the heads of the New Day Co-Op consortium of drug dealers. He is in an awkward position, having had an entire shipment of narcotics stolen by Omar. He tries to convince his colleagues that they should pay for a replacement shipment while they work on recovering the stolen drugs. The rest of the Co-Op members are dubious and tell Joe that as the drugs were in the possession of his people when they were stolen, he will have to make up for the loss. Joe threatens to cut them off from his supplier in the future if they insist on this course and this quiets their protests. Marlo Stanfield quizzes Joe about which of his people was there when the shipment was taken. Joe admits that it was his nephew Cheese, but tells Marlo that he will protect Cheese from any retribution. He offers to put Marlo in touch with his connection so he can reassure him that Cheese did not steal the drugs for himself.

Joe discusses this course with his lieutenants Cheese and Slim Charles. Both are dubious of the wisdom in letting Marlo meet their supplier, as they believe he will try to circumvent them. Omar arrives at the store and faces hostility from Cheese and Slim Charles. Joe is more pragmatic and listens to Omar's sales pitch of returning the heroin at "twenty cents on the dollar". Cheese threatens to torture Omar, but Joe sees the futility in this and agrees to buy the drugs. Omar collects the clock that he gave Joe to fix and pays him for the work.

Joe chaperones Marlo to his meeting with Spiros "Vondas" Vondopoulos. Vondas guarantees Joe's word on the stolen shipment of drugs and leaves. Marlo instructs Monk to have Vondas followed. Monk informs Marlo that Chris and Snoop have been arrested and Marlo tells him to call their bondsman.

=== Dukie ===
Duquan "Dukie" Weems walks past Randy’s home to find that it has burned down. He arrives home and overhears Michael Lee having sex with an unknown girl. He goes to attend his first day of high school, but changes his mind on the way there. Dukie visits Roland "Prez" Pryzbylewski at the middle school and gives him a gift. Prez tells him that he can stop by any time, but later sees him dealing drugs on a corner and realizes that he has dropped out of high school.

=== School ===
Prez supervises his class while they take the statewide tests. Calvin refuses to begin the test, but most students are working hard. In the special class, the majority of the students are not participating, but Namond, Zenobia, and Darnell Tyson are attempting the test.

Howard "Bunny" Colvin announces the cessation of the special class to the students. The majority are pleased, but Zenobia is reluctant to return.

Prez receives the test results and is pleased to learn that over a third of his students are classified as proficient. Miss Sampson grounds him by explaining that a score of proficient means reading at a level two grades below the student's age. Prez admits that he is still learning and Sampson tells him that he is going to be fine. Prez welcomes the special students back to class. Only Albert makes a disruptive comment, but apologizes after none of the other students laugh.

=== Randy ===
Sergeant Ellis Carver desperately tries to find somewhere suitable for Randy Wagstaff to stay following the firebombing of his previous home and serious injuries to his foster mother. He is insistent that Randy cannot go back to a group home. Lieutenant Mello is unsympathetic and tells Carver to take what is on offer.

Carver visits the social services offices personally and tries to convince them to put Randy at the top of the list for foster placement. Carver offers to foster Randy himself and the department tells him that he needs to go through three months of screening before he can take custody. At day's end Randy is still sleeping on the bench in Carver's office. The next morning Mello gives Carver an angry tirade when he discovers Randy and orders him to hand him over to DSS. Randy offers Carver his savings to bribe someone for a foster place.

Carver drops Randy off at a group home and Randy offers him forgiveness and gratitude for his attempts to help. Carver leaves completely frustrated and vents his anger in his car. Randy, discovering that all of his savings have been stolen and his bunk bed is covered in graffiti, is beaten up by several roommates, though he shows his newfound toughness by punching one of his attackers right before being beaten down.

=== Namond ===
Dennis "Cutty" Wise is recuperating following a fracture of his leg in a shooting. The nurse believes that Cutty is a gangster, having reviewed his medical records. Colvin arrives and asks Cutty for help with Namond. They meet again later and Cutty reports that Wee-Bey Brice has agreed to meet with Colvin. Cutty tells Colvin that Carver now owes him a favor. On his way out the nurse, who presumes Colvin is on police duty, asks him when they are arresting Cutty and he relays that Cutty runs a community gym and that Cutty was shot trying to convince a kid to leave the corners.

Colvin visits Wee-Bey in prison. Wee-Bey recognizes him from his time as a patrol officer. Colvin tells him that he is now a sort of teacher rather than a police officer. Colvin tells Wee-Bey that Namond is a bright boy with a lot of potential, but that he will not survive life on the streets. Wee-Bey believes the risks of the game will determine Namond's fate, but Colvin convinces him that Namond's nature has a large part to play. He asks Wee-Bey to give him custody of his son.

Colvin picks Namond up from school where he is being watched by Miss Duquette and Dr. Parenti. He tells his colleagues that he believes that Wee-Bey will return Namond to his mother. Parenti states that they have a meeting at City Hall.

Colvin is nervous about meeting with the mayor because of his history with the police force, but finds that Carcetti will not be in the meeting due to his meeting with the governor in Annapolis. Steintorf and Gerry are skeptical about the technique, characterizing it as tracking of students and leaving a subgroup behind. Colvin claims that the children are already being left behind and laughs about the system's refusal to admit its failings. Steintorf brings the meeting to a swift close. As they leave Colvin laments his shortcomings in the political arena. Parenti blames the failure on the process and seeks consolation in his academic findings.

Meanwhile, Wee-Bey tells De'Londa Brice that if she has thrown Namond out then he will stay out of her care. De'Londa claims that she is trying to harden Namond and Wee-Bey threatens that if she does not let their son go, he will use his reputation against her. She asks Wee-Bey if he is cutting her off, but he reassures her that their relationship is not over.

=== Politics ===
Carcetti watches a news report about the exhumed bodies and discusses the political implications with his staff. Norman Wilson remarks that the bodies are attributable to the Royce administration and Michael Steintorf, the new chief of staff, states that the silver lining of the story is that it draws attention away from the massive school deficit. Steintorf counsels that they should use this as cover to avoid dealing with the deficit as it would hamstring Carcetti's plans to run for governor and that Carcetti will have the funds to address the city's education problems when he becomes governor. Wilson is disappointed to see that Carcetti is willing to trade fulfilling his responsibilities as mayor with increasing his chances of becoming governor.

At home by the Christmas tree, Carcetti discusses his options with his wife Jen. She tells him that she believes he will do the right thing. Later, Wilson and Carcetti return from a second meeting with the governor. Wilson is enraged that Carcetti could not swallow his pride to rescue the school system. Carcetti is angry that the governor was going to call a press conference belittling him if he took the money. Steintorf consoles Carcetti, again telling him that he can do more good as governor himself.

Wilson meets with Coleman Parker in a bar. He confides his disappointment in Carcetti and Parker tells him that all politicians disappoint. Wilson asks who Parker is working with next; Parker says he might stay with Royce or back a young politician.

=== Western District ===
Poot Carr and Bodie Broadus visit the site where one of the bodies was found. They have heard that Little Kevin's body was found inside. Bodie becomes increasingly agitated about the unjustifiable nature of the killing of his friend. Officer Jimmy McNulty recognizes Bodie when he vandalizes a patrol car as he is being arrested by other officers.

McNulty visits the staging area and asks Pearlman how many bodies have been recovered. She reports that 17 corpses have been discovered so far. He asks Pearlman to sign off on releasing Bodie without charge. McNulty quizzes his colleagues about the case they are building. They affectionately taunt him by saying that a real police officer would feel compelled to help them.

McNulty waits for Bodie as he is released from jail and offers to buy him lunch. As they leave, Monk arrives with the bondsman and notices Bodie getting into McNulty's car. McNulty takes Bodie to Cylburn Arboretum. Bodie tells him that he is not an informant, but admits his frustration with his life as a drug dealer and Marlo's leadership. He states that Marlo expects his people to stand behind him, yet he himself does not stand behind people who work for him. He tells McNulty that the game is rigged and that he feels like a pawn on a chessboard, showing that some of D'Angelo Barksdale's teachings were not lost on him. He offers McNulty information to bring down Marlo, but openly tells McNulty that he will not give any information on any former Barksdale associate. McNulty, out of genuine respect, tells Bodie that he is a soldier.

=== Stanfield Organization ===
Monk reports sighting Bodie to Marlo and a newly released Chris. Marlo instructs Chris to have Michael kill Bodie on the chance of him being an informant. Chris tells Marlo that Michael worked for Bodie so the task should go to someone else, as Michael's first kill should be a stranger. Marlo relays the latest news about the theft of their shipment and Omar's offer to sell it back to them. Marlo mentions that Proposition Joe said Omar offered to sell it back at 30 cents to the dollar, 10 cents more than what Omar actually told Joe.

Bodie returns to work on his corner with Poot and Spider. He notices someone approaching in the shadows and Poot sees someone coming from the other direction. Recognizing Chris and Snoop in the darkness, Bodie and Poot realize that the pair have arrived to kill Bodie. Poot urges him to flee, but Bodie refuses to run from his own territory. Spider runs while Bodie fires into the darkness. Poot makes a final plea and then takes flight himself. Bodie, refusing to back down from Marlo and the Stanfield Organization any longer, stands his ground and fires at Chris and Snoop, yelling to them that he isn't running away from them and that they won't put his body in an empty row house as they have with their other victims. As Bodie is distracted by Chris and Snoop, O-Dog steps from a doorway and shoots him in the back of the head. Bodie falls, and O-Dog fires another shot at the back of Bodie's head, finishing him.

Marlo, Chris and Snoop visit Michael at home. Marlo questions him about the ring he is wearing on a chain around his neck and Michael reports that he took it from someone. Marlo is shocked, as the ring, which he initially took from Old Face Andre as part of a punishment for his stash house being robbed by Omar, had been stolen from Marlo by Omar several weeks ago in the poker game robbery (and subsequently by Officer Walker from Omar when he was falsely arrested for murder, and then by Michael from Walker when the schoolboys ambushed him and covered him with yellow paint in an alley). Michael offers to give him the ring, unaware of its past, but Marlo allows him to keep it. Dukie descends and offers to ready Bug for school. Marlo tells Michael that he is putting him in charge of Bodie's corner and that he has another task for him. Snoop asks Michael who they killed for him and he reveals that it was Bug's father.

Michael kills a drug dealer in a close-range shooting as Chris and Monk look on.

=== McNulty ===
Carver reports Bodie's death to McNulty as he arrives for work. McNulty rushes to read the report and throws the sheet across the room in despair. McNulty searches Poot at his corner and asks him who killed Bodie. Poot refuses to offer him anything beyond blaming the murder on the police for talking with Bodie. McNulty lets him go.

McNulty discusses Bodie's murder with Beadie in bed. He tells her about the new major case investigation and she immediately realizes that he wants to get involved. McNulty tells her that he feels that he owes it to Bodie. He speculates that he will be different with fewer vices and less anger now that he is with Beadie.

McNulty meets with Daniels to request a transfer. Daniels asks if he is certain and McNulty tells him that he is optimistic about his ability to keep himself separate from his work. They make a joke of strategy for the case by quoting their initial conversation about the Barksdale case from "The Target", but with the roles reversed.

=== Chapter closes ===
As Paul Weller's cover of Dr. John's "Walk On Gilded Splinters" plays, a montage of scenes unfolds: Wee-Bey tells Namond that he is still his father and passes him into Colvin's custody; McNulty is welcomed back to Major Crimes, where Michael's picture is already on the board (although he is labeled as an "unknown" for the time being); Herc faces an internal investigations trial board, where he appears to fear for his job, with the words "conduct unbecoming" heard from the investigators; Vondas and Joe meet while Marlo watches them undetected from a distance; Parenti presents his findings to an academic audience, and a disenchanted Colvin walks out in frustration during his presentation; Bunk briefs the homicide unit on the corpses found in vacant buildings; Landsman is distraught at the state of his homicides board; Daniels and Pearlman eat lunch with Carcetti while Burrell and Clay Davis look on; Prez tracks Dukie down, working on Michael's corner with Poot and Kenard, but drives away without approaching him; Randy's bed is daubed with the words "Snitch Bitch", his money is stolen, and he is assaulted by his roommates; Cutty shows the newly adoring nurse his gym; Carcetti suffers through a budget meeting; Carver moves a group of children on from Randy, Dukie, Michael and Namond's old hangout; and in what might be a dream or a memory, Michael tutors Bug, only to be roused by Chris—he is still in the back of the car after his second murder and is instructed to drop his gun down a storm drain.

Namond is sent to a new day of school by Colvin and his wife. As he readies himself he sees Donut in yet another stolen car and they share a nod. Donut drives away and the street is peaceful again. The season ends with a lingering shot of a crossroads.

== Production ==
=== Title reference ===
Although most obviously referring to the test grades received by the school's students, the title also refers to the final evaluation of Parenti and Colvin's pilot program, Chris and Snoop's evaluations of O-Dog and Michael's skills, and to the end-of-year statistics which Carcetti leaves in Royce's name.

=== Epigraph ===
If animal trapped call 410-844-6286. - Baltimore, traditional

This is printed on the wooden doors used to close off the vacant houses in West Baltimore. The text has appeared several times in past seasons. The quote references many of the season's characters, who appear hopelessly trapped by their environment.

At the time of the episode the number connected with an automated message giving the local Baltimore time. That number was disconnected in June 2011.

=== Music ===
Paul Weller's cover version of "I Walk On Gilded Splinters" plays over the episode's closing montage.

=== Non-fiction elements ===
- Cutty's hospital roommate is watching the episode "E.B. Was Left Out" from another HBO series, Deadwood.

=== Credits ===
==== Starring cast ====
Although credited, Glynn Turman does not appear in this episode.

==== Guest stars ====
- Paul Ben-Victor as Spiros "Vondas" Vondopoulos
- Amy Ryan as Beatrice "Beadie" Russell
- Isiah Whitlock, Jr. as Clay Davis
- Jermaine Crawford as Duquan "Dukie" Weems
- Maestro Harrell as Randy Wagstaff
- Julito McCullum as Namond Brice
- Tristan Wilds as Michael Lee
- Gbenga Akinnagbe as Chris Partlow
- Hassan Johnson as Roland "Wee-Bey" Brice
- Jay Landsman as Lieutenant Dennis Mello
- Ed Norris as Detective Ed Norris
- Delaney Williams as Sergeant Jay Landsman
- Robert F. Chew as Proposition Joe
- Steve Earle as Walon
- Anwan Glover as Slim Charles
- Method Man as Calvin "Cheese" Wagstaff
- Kelli R. Brown as Kimmy
- Tray Chaney as Malik "Poot" Carr
- S. Robert Morgan as Butchie
- Ramón Rodríguez as Renaldo
- Stacie Davis as Miss Duquette
- Dan DeLuca as Dr. David Parenti
- Neal Huff as Michael Steintorf
- Dravon James as Mrs. Grace Sampson
- Cleo Reginald Pizana as Chief of Staff Coleman Parker
- Taylor King as Zenobia Dawson
- Jeffrey Lorenzo as Karim Williams
- Rakiya Orange as Charlene Young
- Felicia Pearson as Felicia "Snoop" Pearson
- Rico Sterling as Calvin
- Jason Wharton as Albert Stokes
- Keenon Brice as Bug
- Nathan Corbett as Donut
- Thuliso Dingwall as Kenard
- Shenia Hatchett as Unknown
- Destiny Jackson-Evans as Crystal Judkins
- Na'Dria Jennings as Chandra Porter
- Gary D'Addario as Grand Jury Prosecutor Gary DiPasquale
- Darrell Britt-Gibson as O-Dog
- Edward Green as Spider
- Sandi McCree as De'Londa Brice
- Kwame Patterson as "Monk" Metcalf
- Troj. Marquis Strickland as Fat Face Rick
- Megan Anderson as Jen Carcetti
- Sheila Gaskins as Mrs. Anderson
- Reginald Gilmer as Unknown
- Duane Rawlings as Hungry Man
- Michael Salconi as Michael Santangelo
- Karen Vicks as Gerry
- Gregory L. Williams as Detective Crutchfield

==== Uncredited appearances ====
- Rick Otto as Officer Kenneth Dozerman
- Benjamin Busch as Officer Anthony Colicchio
- Ryan Sands as Officer Lloyd "Truck" Garrick
- Sho Brown as Phil Boy
- Mike D. Anderson as Ghost
- Larry Andrews as Donnie
- Marvina Vinique as Nurse
- Unknown as DSS Bureaucrat

== Reception ==
=== Critical response ===
The episode received unanimous acclaim from television critics. The Futon Critic named it the second best episode of 2006, saying "David Simon did it again. He made us think these four boys—Namond (Julito McCullum), Michael (Tristan Wilds), Randy (Maestro Harrell) and Duquan (Jermaine Crawford)—could have at the very least a future and ripped the rug out from under nearly all of them. He gave us a voice in Bodie (JD Williams), who rallied against the current state of "the game," only to silence it. He gave us a saintly mayor (Aidan Gillen), only to muzzle him with bureaucracy. In the end however he did give us the "old" McNulty (Dominic West) back and the promise to fight the good fight once again. And I'm sure he'll make us believe again—and rip the rug out from under us again. And I wouldn't have it any other way."

=== Awards and nominations ===
The episode's writers, David Simon and Ed Burns, were nominated for a Writers Guild of America Award for their work.

In 2009, TV Guide ranked "Final Grades" #26 on its list of the 100 Greatest Episodes.

== See also ==
- List of television episodes listed among the best
