= Stringer Bell =

Character from The Wire

- The Wire character
- Idris Elba as Stringer Bell
- First appearance: "The Target" (2002)
- Last appearance: "Mission Accomplished" (2004)
- Created by: David Simon
- Portrayed by: Idris Elba

In-universe information
- Full name: Russell Bell
- Aliases: Stringer; String
- Occupation: Drug kingpin; Housing developer

Russell "Stringer" Bell is a fictional character and one of the main antagonists in The Wire, played by Idris Elba. In the criminal world of early 2000s Baltimore, Bell serves as drug kingpin Avon Barksdale's second-in-command and assumes direct control of the Barksdale Organization during Avon's imprisonment. Bell is a terse and brooding leader, who shuns the flamboyance of the likes of Avon for ruthless pragmatism and legitimacy.

He attends macroeconomics classes at Baltimore City Community College and maintains a personal library, including a copy of Adam Smith's The Wealth of Nations. He attempts to legitimize the Barksdale Organization and insulates himself from direct criminality through money laundering and investments in housing development, aided through his buying of influence from politicians.

== Biography ==
=== Season 1 ===
Stringer is first seen attending the trial of Avon's nephew and lieutenant, D'Angelo Barksdale, for the murder of rival drug dealer "Pooh" Blanchard. To ensure D'Angelo's acquittal, Stringer has enforcers Roland "Wee-Bey" Brice, Anton "Stinkum" Artis, and Savino Bratton intimidate and bribe witnesses over the course of the trial. When D'Angelo is released, Avon has Stringer demote D'Angelo from the Barksdale towers to the low-rise projects known as "the pit".

Elsewhere, Stringer deals with Omar Little's crew after they steal some of Barksdale's stash from the pit. Stringer instructs D'Angelo to check his organization for an informant who may have given Omar information. Avon has Stringer assist Stinkum in taking over new territory for the organization.

Stringer takes Stinkum to survey his new territory, with some additional muscle in the form of Wee-Bey and Marquis "Bird" Hilton. While there, Stringer receives word from D'Angelo that two of his crew, Wallace and Poot Carr, have spotted Omar's boyfriend Brandon Wright at an arcade. Stringer and his crew abduct Brandon and torture him to death while trying to discover Omar's whereabouts.

After Omar kills Stinkum and wounds Wee-Bey, Stringer tries to persuade Avon to offer a truce to Omar and kill him when he lets his guard down. Avon initially brushes Stringer's suggestion aside but accepts this advice after Omar nearly kills him. Stringer also persuades Avon to give up his pager, making Stringer a buffer between Avon and the rest of the operation.

As Avon increasingly suspects that he is being watched by police, Stringer takes precautions to smoke out informants and counter wiretaps. He instructs D'Angelo to withhold pay from his subordinates for several weeks on the grounds that those who do not soon ask for money are likely to be the ones being paid as informants. However, this plan reveals no informants. To foil wiretaps, Stringer insists on phone discipline, telling the pit crew to remove nearby payphones and walk longer distances to other phones instead.

When it is time for Avon to clean house, Stringer orders the murder of Wallace, who played a part in Brandon's abduction and was disconcerted by the sight of his mutilated body. Stringer tries to find out about Wallace's whereabouts from D'Angelo, who realizes his friend is in danger and only tells Stringer that Wallace left the business. Stringer turns to Bodie Broadus, D'Angelo's second-in-command, and learns that Wallace has returned to working for D'Angelo. Stringer asks Bodie to kill Wallace while also having Nakeesha Lyles, a witness he had bribed in D'Angelo's trial, murdered by a member of the organization.

Stringer assumes command of the Barksdale crew when Avon is arrested at the end of season 1; Stringer is not arrested due to a lack of evidence or wiretap information mentioning Stringer. D'Angelo is also arrested and blames Stringer when he learns of Wallace's death, driving a wedge between the two. Stringer rewards Bodie's loyalty by promoting him to run their operation at the Franklin Terrace projects.

=== Season 2 ===
In season 2, Stringer faces a serious problem when the Barksdales' usual supplier, a Dominican named Roberto, becomes the focus of a DEA investigation. The New York-based Dominican syndicate ends its partnership with the Barksdales, suspecting Avon of informing on them in exchange for a lighter prison sentence. Avon finds alternatives through Philadelphia and Atlanta connections, but the heroin they supply is far less potent and more expensive.

Compounding this problem, all of Avon's hitmen have either been killed or arrested. At the same time, Proposition Joe introduces a purer, more effective heroin line through his connection with The Greek, leading many drug users to migrate to his territory. With the Barksdales' operation threatened, Stringer grows desperate.

Stringer becomes concerned with D'Angelo's increasingly hostile attitude towards his uncle, fearful that he may turn against the Barksdales. Stringer secretly becomes involved with D'Angelo's girlfriend, Donette, using the relationship to keep an eye on D'Angelo. When D'Angelo cuts himself off from the rest of his family, Stringer secretly arranges with a connection in Washington, DC to have him killed. Stringer's connection has his cousin, who is in the same prison, strangle D'Angelo and stage the death as a suicide. Stringer stresses the need to keep Avon from knowing about his role in D'Angelo's death.

Looking to solve the Barksdales’ struggling drug trade, Stringer decides to go behind Avon's back and secretly agrees to share Barksdale territory with Proposition Joe in exchange for Joe's higher-quality heroin, an idea Avon vehemently opposed. When Avon hires the legendary New York enforcer Brother Mouzone to chase rival drug dealers out of the Barksdale towers, Stringer maneuvers carefully to preserve his alliance with Joe behind Avon's back.

He manages to do so by tricking Omar into shooting Mouzone by blaming him for Brandon's death. The plan fails after Omar shoots Mouzone, but calls the paramedics after realizing he's been lied to by Stringer. With Mouzone returning to New York to recover, Avon grudgingly agrees to Joe's proposal.

=== Season 3 ===
Stringer uses more business-like strategies as he continues running the Barksdale empire. He obtains legitimate business fronts for the Barksdales, forms the New Day Co-Op with Proposition Joe and other rival dealers, and runs meetings with his underlings according to Robert's Rules of Order. Stringer is also shown to have made several donations to local business leaders and politicians, including the corrupt State Senator Clay Davis, to facilitate development of a condominium complex.

Along with Joe, Stringer effectively runs the drug supply in Baltimore. The two realize that the associated murders, not the drug trade itself, are what bring on serious police investigations. Consequently they strive to minimize violence among their crews and the other Co-Op dealers.

The resulting lack of murders forces Cedric Daniels' Major Crimes Unit to turn its attention elsewhere, namely to a more reckless Jamaican dealer named Kintell "Prince K" Williamson. Most of the unit understands the decision, but Jimmy McNulty angrily objects, pointing out that Stringer is clearly a more prolific trafficker than their new target. This brings McNulty into conflict with Lester Freamon, with Kima Greggs caught in the middle, and Roland Pryzbylewski and Leander Sydnor disenchanted with the less interesting Williamson. As a result, the Major Crimes Unit, previously the most effective unit in the Baltimore Police Department, is temporarily compromised, and Stringer is able to operate without interference for a time.

When Avon is released from prison, he is uninterested in Stringer's efforts to reform the Barksdales. While Stringer wants to invest the organization's profits in legitimate business investments, Avon is more concerned with an imminent war against Marlo Stanfield. As Avon's war against Marlo begins to draw more police attention, Joe and other Co-Op members threaten to cut Stringer off from the Greek's heroin supply if he can't stop the violence.

In Stringer's view, this would make any victory over Marlo worthless, as street corners generate no money without drugs to sell on them. When Stringer asserts his opposition to Avon's war against Marlo, Avon accuses him of lacking the masculinity necessary for their business. Stringer angrily rebuts by revealing that he had ordered D'Angelo's death. Stringer's relationship with Avon is irreparably damaged by this revelation.

Stringer's inroads into real estate are hamstrung by the nuances of a legitimate business world that he does not fully understand, with his condominium project repeatedly delayed by bureaucratic obstacles. Worse, Stringer bribes Davis to connect his organization with federal housing grants, only to learn that Davis had fabricated his federal contact and pocketed the money. Enraged, Stringer tells Slim Charles to assassinate Davis, an order Avon immediately rescinds.

Stringer's luck takes a turn for the worse when Williamson joins the New Day Co-Op and McNulty manages to get the MCU to shift focus back to the Barksdales. Freamon and Prez slowly gather conspiracy evidence against Stringer and his lieutenants, and eventually catch Stringer making an incriminating phone call using one of his many SIM cards. This finally gives MCU enough evidence to make a move against Stringer.

Stringer plans to stabilize control of the Barksdales by sending Avon back to prison for parole violations. In making those plans he betrays the location of the Barksdale weapons cache to Major Howard "Bunny" Colvin. Stringer is simultaneously betrayed by Avon, when Mouzone confronts him about Stringer's plot to engineer a conflict between himself and Omar. In an effort to avoid a war with Mouzone and his New York associates, Avon reluctantly tells him Stringer's whereabouts.

The next day, Omar and Mouzone track Stringer to his development site, kill his bodyguard, and hunt him down and corner him as he tries to escape. Stringer at first tries desperately bargaining for his life, but when Omar reveals that he and Mouzone are after him for personal reasons, and that Avon has betrayed him, he somberly resigns himself to his fate and is shot to death by Omar and Mouzone.

With Stringer dead and Avon imprisoned, the Barksdale Organization crumbles. Slim Charles becomes the de facto leader of what remains of the crew, which he merges with Proposition Joe's drug operations. Marlo becomes the new power player in West Baltimore by default. McNulty and the police search Stringer's apartment and find it extremely clean, stylishly furnished, and tastefully decorated, far from their expectations of a drug kingpin. Stringer's bookshelf includes a copy of The Wealth of Nations.

McNulty expresses regret that he could not arrest his archrival before he died, and displays an odd admiration for Stringer's lofty dreams and a grudging respect for his talent as a drug kingpin. In essence, McNulty feels purposeless without his adversary, and it is this sense of aimlessness that leads him to transfer to patrol in the Western District and straighten his life out.

== Legacy ==
In the season 5 episode "Late Editions", Clay Davis, while describing to Lester Freamon how drug money is routed from the kingpins to state and city politicians through their lawyers, mentions how he conned a fellow named "Bell" into giving him a great deal of money, because Davis had convinced him that he would be able to use his connections to push his development forward quickly. As Davis laughs about how he conned Stringer, Freamon's eyes light up in recognition.

== Origins ==
Stringer Bell's name is a composite of real Baltimore drug lords Stringer Reed and Roland Bell. His story bears many similarities to the life of Kenneth A. Jackson, including his crossover from the illegal drug trade to legitimate business ownership and political contributions.

== In popular culture ==
In 2019, political writer Adam Serwer apparently coined the term "The Stringer Bell Rule" for the adage "don't keep notes on a criminal conspiracy". Bell's line "is you taking notes on a criminal fucking conspiracy?" from the Season 3 episode "Straight and True" was cited as early as 2017 to express incredulity at the Trump team's documented interactions with Russia during his 2016 election campaign, and in 2013 as advice for JPMorgan after a spreadsheet listing alleged improprieties was found during a criminal investigation.
