= Lester Freamon =

Character from The Wire

- The Wire character
- Clarke Peters as Lester Freamon
- First appearance: "The Detail" (2002)
- Last appearance: "–30–" (2008)
- Created by: David Simon
- Portrayed by: Clarke Peters

In-universe information
- Title: Detective
- Occupation: Baltimore Police Detective; Major Crimes Unit (seasons 1–5); Homicide (seasons 2, 4)
- Spouse: Shardene Innes

Lester Freamon is a fictional character on the HBO drama The Wire, played by actor Clarke Peters. Freamon is a detective in the Baltimore Police Department's Major Crimes Unit. He is a wise, methodical detective whose intelligence and experience are often central to investigations throughout the series, particularly with respect to uncovering networks of money laundering and corruption. He sometimes serves as an avuncular figure to several of the characters.

== Character background and plot relations ==
Freamon is a veteran of the Baltimore Police who establishes a positive reputation for his instincts, tenacity and intelligence. He served in the military and fought in the Vietnam War before joining the force. He was assigned to Homicide until he charged a politically connected fence to coerce his testimony in a homicide case, against the orders of the Deputy Commissioner. Though the case was successfully closed, Freamon was transferred to the pawn shop unit as a punishment.

Freamon spent thirteen years and four months in the assignment, until he had been completely forgotten by management. A deskbound Freamon took a hobby of making dollhouse furniture, which provides him with a substantial supplemental income and contributes to his eccentric reputation among fellow police. At the end of the series, it was revealed that Freamon had joined the department in the early 1970s, around the same time as Bill Rawls, Ervin Burrell and Howard "Bunny" Colvin, yet focused solely on police work and never obtained rank.

=== Season 1 ===
Freamon, along with other detectives viewed as useless by the BPD higher-ups, is transferred to the initial Barksdale detail under Lieutenant Cedric Daniels. When Polk and Mahon fail to find a good photo of Avon Barksdale, Freamon takes a cue from an offhand comment from Kima Greggs and tracks down a photo of Avon at a boxing gym. He further impresses his colleagues when he locates D'Angelo Barksdale's pager number at an abandoned stash house. Impressed by Freamon's abilities, Jimmy McNulty inquires about him in a conversation with Bunk Moreland, who tells him Freamon is an ex-homicide detective. Later, Freamon tells McNulty he was sent to the pawn shop unit after angering the then-Deputy Ops. Freamon warns that McNulty will probably suffer a similar fate at the conclusion of the case.

Freamon proves himself adept at building the Barksdale case through the use of a wiretap; he recognizes patterns of pager messages and telephone calls, which lead to several breakthroughs, most notably finding the main stash house in Pimlico. He also leads the investigation into the Barksdales' financial records and uncovers their various political connections, instructing Leander Sydnor and Roland Pryzbylewski in the mechanics of following the paper trail. He also recruits Shardene Innes, one of the dancers in the Barksdales' strip club, as an informant, beginning a romantic relationship with her in the process.

After Greggs gets shot, Freamon tracks a page made by Wee-Bey Brice, one of the shooters, to a payphone where he finds evidence implicating the other shooter, Little Man. He then uses a contact in the phone company to trace call patterns and pinpoint Wee-Bey's whereabouts, leading to his arrest and conviction. Following the dissolution of the detail, Rawls notes Freamon's competence as a detective and transfers him back into Homicide; he makes room for Freamon by dumping McNulty to the Marine Unit in the fashion that Freamon had predicted.

=== Season 2 ===
Freamon is now partnered with Bunk, and they are quickly recognized as the best detectives in Homicide. Sergeant Jay Landsman assigns them to a case of fourteen Jane Does found in a shipping container at the Port of Baltimore. Replacing Detective Ray Cole, Freamon protests "that ain't right" for just the two of them to be working on the case. They get detailed Beadie Russell, the officer from the Port Authority who initially found the bodies, as a liaison for the investigation. They determine that the women in the container suffocated after an air pipe was deliberately closed off, and that a fourteenth body picked up by McNulty is tied to the case.

Freamon and Bunk travel to the Philadelphia port and detain the vessel that delivered the container to Baltimore. They attempt to question the crew, but none of them speak English. They eventually let the ship go after learning that two crewmen jumped ship after Baltimore. Based on the few facts they have, Freamon and Bunk deduce that the women were prostitutes being smuggled from overseas, that one of the girls was murdered by a sailor after refusing sex, and that the rest were killed for witnessing the crime. The killer is one of the crewmen who fled, leaving the investigation at a dead end. Freamon and Bunk are severely rebuked by a frustrated Rawls for releasing the ship without getting statements.

Freamon is relieved to be assigned, at Daniels' request, to the detail investigating Frank Sobotka and the stevedore union. Though he continues to assist Bunk and Russell in the Jane Does, he becomes focused on the investigation of smuggling through the Baltimore ports. On Beadie's advice, Freamon convinces Daniels to clone the port's computers to track container movements. They are able to follow containers being moved illegally to a warehouse, ultimately linking Sobotka to the criminal activities of The Greek.

The investigation closes with several arrests and, in the process, Freamon identifies a dismembered body killed by The Greek's crew as being one of the crewmen who jumped ship. Bunk and Freamon solve the Jane Doe homicides after Sergei Malatov, facing a possible death sentence, gives them the details they needed. Landsman and Rawls are again content with the Homicide unit's clearance rate.

=== Season 3 ===
Freamon stays with Daniels in the now-permanent Major Crimes Unit, building a case against their assigned target, a drug dealer named Kintel Williamson. He acts as a mediator between Daniels and McNulty, reminding the latter that Daniels had gotten him out of the marine unit. When the unit's focus is returned to the Barksdales, Freamon is stumped by the new strategy of using disposable cell phones, finishing their pre-paid minutes before a wiretap can be approved.

He masterminds a scheme wherein he goes undercover as a con artist selling illegally recharged (and wiretapped) disposable phones to Bernard, a Barksdale soldier that Bubbles is acquainted with. Avon gets caught in a safehouse filled with illegal weapons and returned to prison, though an also-implicated Stringer Bell is killed before he can be arrested.

=== Season 4 ===
Freamon is now the guiding force behind the MCU, now led (at least on paper) by Lieutenant Jimmy Asher. The MCU continues running the wiretap on the Stanfield Organization, though Freamon is disappointed that Marlo Stanfield's lack of discipline is making the investigation too easy. Meanwhile, he continues to follow the Barksdale money trail, subpoenaing the financial records of State Senator Clay Davis and property developer Andy Krawczyk.

Freamon wrongly believes that Mayor Clarence Royce would not risk interfering with a criminal investigation to help Davis and Krawczyk due to an upcoming election. Feeling pressure from both, Royce angrily goes to Burrell and Rawls and forces them to deal with it. In order to appease Royce, Rawls concludes that "proper supervision" will keep the MCU under control and prevent them from moving forward. He installs a new commander, Lieutenant Charles Marimow, who immediately butts heads with Freamon by attempting to bring down the wiretap. Freamon is sent to Rawls, who subtly threatens Greggs and Sydnor if Freamon goes to a judge to keep the wiretap running. Freamon concedes, but refuses to work under Marimow.

Out of respect for his shrewd investigative tactics, Rawls transfers Freamon back to Homicide, where Bunk has been investigating the murder of Stanfield drug dealer Fruit and the disappearance of suspect Curtis "Lex" Anderson. They both recognize that Stanfield likely had Lex killed in retribution, but are unable to find the body, which has been sealed up in a vacant row house. Freamon further observes that Stanfield is not tied to any murders since the Barksdale gang war ended, and begins to scour Baltimore for any trace of the bodies he knows must be hidden somewhere.

Herc unwittingly provides Freamon with a key clue in the form of a nail gun he noticed when he pulled over Chris Partlow and Snoop. Pryzbylewski, now a teacher, provides second-hand information through one of his students, Randy Wagstaff, who knows where Lex was killed. While checking abandoned row houses in that immediate area, Freamon notices that one door was nailed shut while the others were screwed, and realizes Lex's body must be inside. He further concludes that the Stanfield Organization is leaving bodies in row houses throughout Baltimore. With the nails identifying which houses double as tombs, more than twenty bodies are found. Daniels, now a colonel gaining political traction, allows Freamon to assemble his team to investigate Stanfield again.

=== Season 5 ===
Freamon reconstitutes the MCU under the command of Asher, which includes McNulty, Greggs, Sydnor and Kenneth Dozerman. Initial investigations into the vacant murders does not provide enough evidence to bring charges against the Stanfield Organization. Freamon elects to begin daily surveillance of Stanfield, who becomes aware of the investigation and limits his violent activity and communications. The MCU becomes dissatisfied when fiscal problems at City Hall lead to the withholding of overtime pay. The unit is eventually shut down to save funds. Freamon is detailed to the State's Attorney's office to prepare a corruption case against Davis. Sydnor joins him in the detail and they report to Assistant State's Attorney Rhonda Pearlman.

Freamon heralds the Davis investigation as a career case, but cannot let go of his work on Stanfield. He continues to surveille Stanfield in his own time and is pleased to find Stanfield "dropping his guard" now that he is no longer under observation. Freamon and McNulty meet with FBI agent Terrence Fitzhugh, unsuccessfully seeking federal support against Stanfield.

McNulty resorts to creating the illusion of a serial killer to draw media attention to the BPD and elicit funding for the Stanfield investigation. Bunk is outraged that McNulty is interfering with crime scenes and falsifying case notes as part of his plan, and enlists Freamon to talk sense into him. However, this backfires when Freamon decides that McNulty hasn't gone far enough and suggests that he should find a way to sensationalize the killer.

Sydnor uncovers evidence that Davis lied on a mortgage application, and Freamon realizes it is significant enough to file federal charges. Rupert Bond decides not to file the new charge, as passing the case over to federal prosecutors would cost him the opportunity to raise his political profile. After Davis is acquitted following an incredible performance on the witness stand, Freamon tries to get the U.S. Attorney to prosecute Davis for lying on his mortgage application. While the office declines because of Davis' heightened profile, Freamon uses the information to blackmail Davis for information about a leak at the courthouse.

McNulty and Freamon collaborate on raising the profile of their fake serial killer, resulting in Freamon adding a sexual motive and supplying a set of dentures to create bite marks on the "victims". They conduct actual canvassing among the homeless as a cover. Freamon also recruits his old patrol partner Oscar Requer to look out for recently deceased bodies of homeless men. They soon have their next fake victim and McNulty mocks up the crime scene and mutilates the body to imply another murder.

When Freamon gets a hold of Stanfield's cell phone, he sets up an illegal wiretap on the phone but is initially surprised to find no conversations taking place on it. Freamon learns Stanfield's phone is transmitting pictures of clocks and tries to break the code. When money is provided for investigation into the "serial killer," which McNulty redirects to the Stanfield investigation, more surveillance officers are added and Sydnor works out that the code is relaying location information for face-to-face meetings. In Freamon's resulting bust, most of the Stanfield Organization is arrested and a large quantity of heroin is confiscated.

Freamon is upset when McNulty tells Greggs about the fake serial-killer plan. After Daniels and Pearlman look into the matter and discover the illegal wiretap, and the subsequent damage it will do to the Stanfield case, they inform Mayor Tommy Carcetti. Pearlman tells McNulty and Freamon that they will not face jail but are finished as police officers. Freamon laments the loss of tracking Stanfield's money trail, but takes the retirement, makes peace with Greggs, and is last seen in the end-of-season montage putting together dollhouse furniture with Shardene.

== See also ==
- Tyreeka Freamon, 15-year-old DeAndre McCullough's real-life on-again/off-again girlfriend portrayed in David Simon and Ed Burns' book and TV adaptation, The Corner
