= Kima Greggs =

Character from The Wire

Shakima Greggs
- The Wire character
- Sonja Sohn as Kima Greggs
- First appearance: "The Target" (2002)
- Last appearance: "–30–" (2008)
- Created by: David Simon
- Portrayed by: Sonja Sohn

In-universe information
- Alias: Kima
- Gender: Female
- Title: Detective
- Occupation: Baltimore Police Detective
- Spouse: Cheryl
- Children: Elijah (son)

Shakima "Kima" Greggs is a fictional character on the HBO drama The Wire, played by actress Sonja Sohn. Greggs is a determined and capable police detective in the Baltimore Police Department. Openly lesbian, she often displays a hardened, cynical demeanor, and has had problems with infidelity, alcohol, and relationships. She plays a key role in all of her BPD details' main cases.

== Character biography ==
=== Season 1 ===
Shakima "Kima" Greggs is a narcotics detective working alongside Herc and Carver, under the command of Cedric Daniels in Major Foerster's narcotics division. She outshines her colleagues on several occasions, earning high esteem from them due to her abilities. Kima lives with her partner Cheryl, a broadcast journalist, who has pressured Kima into studying pre-law.

After D'Angelo Barksdale's acquittal, Kima is assigned to the Avon Barksdale detail and made lead detective by Daniels. She cultivates a relationship with Bubbles, a drug addict with an extraordinary memory for faces, and uses his information to identify Barksdale Organization members and begins to work out their methods. Kima befriends fellow detective Jimmy McNulty, and they convince legendary stick-up man Omar Little to testify against Barksdale soldier Bird for a murder in revenge for the Barksdale Organization's murder of Omar's partner.

Working with detective Lester Freamon, Kima persuades D'Angelo Barksdale's new girlfriend Shardene Innes to turn against him by providing her with evidence that the Barksdale crew are responsible for the death of her friend.

At the end of the season, Kima is shot and critically wounded in an undercover buy bust operation ordered by Deputy Commissioner Ervin Burrell. The shooters flee before backup arrives. Of the two shooters, Kima can only positively identify Little Man. When Mcnulty visits a conscious Kima, Cheryl is angry that they are discussing the case progress. Kima mention Cheryl wants her to leave the Police, she is seen in the finale looking out at a patrol car before walking back to her bed.

Originally, the writers of The Wire planned for Greggs to be killed rather than wounded in the first season. Carolyn Strauss, the president of HBO Entertainment at the time, prevailed upon David Simon to keep the character around; in her opinion, Greggs was a strong character, and having her alive would open more possibilities in later seasons.

=== Season 2 ===
Kima takes a desk job in the narcotics unit because Cheryl fears she could get injured again. Although she has reached second year in law school, she misses the action of street work. At Daniels's request, Kima joins his investigation of Frank Sobotka, which upsets Cheryl. Cheryl becomes pregnant through artificial insemination, although Kima is reluctant to be a parent.

Greggs works with Roland Pryzbylewski to investigate the vice aspects of the smuggling ring linked to Sobotka. They locate a brothel that operates out of a high-class apartment building and uses trafficked women as prostitutes against their will. When McNulty rejoins the team, he goes undercover as a customer to infiltrate the brothel, allowing Kima to arrest the madam. Kima moves on to investigating the leaders of the smuggling ring, but the trail runs dry just as the detail is closing on "The Greek" and his lieutenant Spiros Vondas.

Bubbles is arrested by Santangelo near the end of Sobotka case and asks Kima to help get him out of trouble. He turns Kima and McNulty onto investigating the link between East side drug kingpin Proposition Joe and their old target Stringer Bell. Kima and McNulty soon get photos of the two meeting together.

=== Season 3 ===
Kima continues to work for the now firmly established Major Crimes Unit, reporting to Daniels. The unit initially tries to build a case against Proposition Joe but makes little progress through their wiretaps, because the key members of Joe's organization do not talk on the phone. The case breaks down when the detail arrests Joe's nephew Cheese on suspicion of murder, due to misunderstanding a tapped conversation in which he was talking about putting down his pet dog. With Proposition Joe now aware of the wiretaps, Daniels decides the unit has to move on.

Kima becomes something of a rogue element alongside McNulty. The two pursue the Barksdale Organization even when the unit is supposed to be focused on the Park Heights drug dealer Kintel Williamson, and Freamon becomes exasperated with Greggs' lack of respect for Daniels.

Greggs also becomes dissatisfied with her personal life now that Cheryl has had her baby and is starting to cheat on Cheryl. Kima goes so far as to admit that she only agreed to the baby as a means of appeasing Cheryl. Eventually Kima admits that she has made a mistake, and the two reconcile.

The Barksdales become involved in a turf war with Marlo Stanfield, and with intervention from McNulty, the unit shifts their focus back to them. The unit infiltrates the Barksdale Organization with wiretaps and ties many of their key players, including Stringer, to a case. However, Stringer is murdered before the Major Crimes Unit can arrest him, having been given up by Avon to Brother Mouzone and Omar, as Avon and Stringer's friendship broke down.

Avon gets arrested, but on the basis of a tip Stringer had made to Major Colvin, rather than the unit's casework. At the close of the season Daniels gets promoted to Major and leaves the unit.

=== Season 4 ===
Kima and Freamon became the de facto leaders of the unit now that Daniels has been promoted to Major for the Western District. Their new commander Lieutenant Jimmy Asher is a friend of Freamon's, and is a lenient commander focused on his retirement and building a beach house. As a result, Asher does not mind what the detail does, leaving them to go about the investigation without any chain of command interference.

As elections approach, Freamon picks up the investigation of the Barksdale money trail and serves subpoenas for financial records on many high-ranking political figures. Kima is responsible for delivering a subpoena to campaign fundraiser Andy Krawczyk. Freamon convinces his team that they ought to be protected from politicians under close scrutiny at election time.

The unit focuses on Marlo Stanfield's organization now that he has control of West Baltimore. They quickly gather probable cause for wiretaps on key Stanfield lieutenants Fruit and Monk Metcalf. Fruit gets murdered, but Bunk Moreland from Homicide faithfully delivers his cellphone to the unit allowing them to identify more of the Stanfield network.

Kima surveils Old Face Andre, a drug dealer supplied by Marlo, and notices that his re-supply is delivered to his convenience store. The detail feels they are making progress when they record Marlo talking to Andre on Monk's phone. Kima recognizes the sound of gunshots in the background, maybe the sound of target practice, and wonders why Marlo's crew would engage in shooting practice.

Because of the subpoenas, Mayor Clarence Royce threatens Commissioner Ervin Burrell for trying to charge campaign fundraisers weeks before the election. Deputy Commissioner William Rawls suggests solving the problem by giving the unit "proper supervision". This involves removing Asher and replacing him with the hostile Lieutenant Charles Marimow.

Marimow orders the unit to stop investigating the Barksdale money trail and to close down their investigation of Marlo. Marimow reasons that they should be making faster cases against street level dealers tied to violence.

Dismayed at this change in direction, Kima decides to transfer out of the unit. She asks Daniels for a position in the Western District, but Daniels insists that Kima is too skilled an investigator for district work but offers to help her move laterally. By calling in a favor with Rawls, he is able to get Kima transferred to Homicide.

Kima and Freamon are transferred into Jay Landsman's squad. Kima faces merciless teasing from her colleagues and is further embarrassed when she is ordered to take over the Braddock case - an investigation of a murdered state's witness - because of political pressure to slow the investigation. A further indignity occurs when the story of the reassignment is leaked to the press and the original investigator, Ed Norris, is reassigned as the primary. Kima, Norris, and Landsman are forced to attend a press conference intended to defuse the story with the facade that Kima and Norris were working together all along.

When Kima and Norris attempt to interview a prisoner who claims to have information about the shooting, their investigation is again scuppered by Rawls, who orders Landsman to detail the two to uniform duty at a polling station. Rawls explains to Landsman that whichever way the case goes, it will hurt the chances of one of the mayoral candidates who are neck and neck in the polls.

After the election, Kima is able to proceed with the investigation. She interviews the main suspect in the case but comes to the conclusion that he is innocent. Kima then picks out a detail in the case which leads her back to the crime scene, where she spots a ricochet mark in a nearby brick wall. Kima realizes that Braddock was killed accidentally by a stray bullet and was not murdered.

When Freamon quietly inquires how she's enjoying working Homicide, Kima tells him she's loving it, causing him to move along without offering her a position on the newly restructured Major Crimes Unit. However, after witnessing Bubbles, her former CI, recovering from an attempted suicide Kima appears to have a change of heart and at the end of the season is seen back with the old unit once more.

A major alliance in previous seasons, Kima and Bubbles do not come in contact with each other again after Bubbles decides to pursue a full rehabilitation following the events of season 4.

=== Season 5 ===
The reconstituted Major Crimes Unit spends a year investigating the Stanfield Organization and their potential links to the vacant house murders. Kima is frustrated when financial problems at City Hall lead to withholding of the department's overtime pay. Eventually, Mayor Tommy Carcetti closes down the Major Crimes Unit, and Kima is transferred back to Homicide.

Kima is assigned as the primary investigator on a home invasion and triple homicide. The murder has been committed by Chris Partlow and Snoop on Marlo's orders, and the victims are a drug dealer named Junebug, his partner, and his bodyguard. Junebug's two children are witnesses to the crime. One child has fled the scene, but Kima finds the other still hiding in the closet. She arranges for the child to be taken in by Social Services.

Kima and her partner on the case, Michael Crutchfield, recognize that the killings are professional in nature because of the disabling of the security cameras outside the house and the pattern of the wounds.

Continuing budget constraints mean that Crutchfield is quickly taken off the case, and Kima is left to work alone. She visits the child witness to try to get a statement, but the child remains withdrawn.

Kima decides to try and reconnect with Cheryl and her son Elijah, and arranges to babysit while Cheryl is at work. Initially Elijah ignores Kima, but unlike her experience with the child witness, Kima is able to engage Elijah in making Legos buildings with her.

After McNulty confesses to Kima that he has created the fake serial killer, Kima is stunned and angry about the deception and waste of resources. She reports McNulty and Freamon to Daniels, which leads to the end of McNulty and Freamon's careers in the Baltimore Police Department.

At the "wake" commemorating the end of McNulty and Lester's police careers, Kima arrives late and admits to them both that she blew the whistle. McNulty says she did the right thing and shakes her hand before going home; Freamon invites her into the bar to drink with him and his former colleagues.

Kima is last seen on a homicide call with Bunk, enjoying lighthearted conversation with him that echoes Bunk's earlier conversations with McNulty.
