= Tommy Carcetti =

Character from The Wire

Thomas J. Carcetti
- The Wire character
- Aidan Gillen as Tommy Carcetti
- First appearance: "Time After Time" (2004)
- Last appearance: "–30–" (2008)
- Created by: David Simon
- Portrayed by: Aidan Gillen

In-universe information
- Alias: Tommy (nickname)
- Gender: Male
- Title(s): Councilman; Mayor; Governor
- Occupation: Baltimore City Councilman; Mayor of Baltimore; Governor of Maryland (after the ending)
- Spouse: Jen Carcetti
- Nationality: Italian-American

Thomas J. "Tommy" Carcetti (/kɑːrˈkɛti/ kar-KET-ee) is a fictional character on the HBO drama The Wire, played by Aidan Gillen. Carcetti is an ambitious and venal Baltimore politician who begins the series with a seat on the city council.

== Biography ==
=== Season 3 ===
Tommy Carcetti first appears as a member of the Baltimore City Council. Although he is depicted as a loving father, he is regularly unfaithful to his wife Jen. He also works closely with Tony Gray, a fellow councilman. Carcetti is idealistic and ambitious, and has the backing of local Democrats in Baltimore's 1st district as well as Major Stan Valchek of the Baltimore Police Department. To improve upon the crime and urban decay plaguing Baltimore, Carcetti considers running for mayor against the African-American incumbent, Clarence Royce, despite the prospect of being a white candidate in a predominantly black city.

Using his connection to Valchek, Carcetti successfully manipulates Acting Commissioner Ervin Burrell into working with him, promising resources and political capital in exchange for inside information about Royce's decision-making. Carcetti becomes increasingly disillusioned with Royce and decides to run against him, recruiting college friend and Washington political consultant Theresa D'Agostino as his campaign manager.

With Carcetti's encouragement, Gray starts his own campaign for mayor. Realizing that Gray's campaign would split the black voter base in the election, D'Agostino advises Carcetti that enhancing Gray's chances of success would in turn improve his own. Carcetti dislikes the idea of abusing his friend's trust, but follows D'Agostino's strategy nonetheless.

After the BPD learns about "Hamsterdam" — Major Howard "Bunny" Colvin's drug-tolerant zones in West Baltimore — Royce refuses to allow the department to immediately shut them down. Burrell, believing the mayor is making a ploy against the police, leaks the information to Carcetti. At D'Agostino's suggestion, Carcetti tours the area with Colvin, seeing that Hamsterdam has had the positive impact of isolating the drug trade from the rest of Colvin's district.

At a city council meeting, Carcetti implicitly blames Royce for the debacle in an impassioned speech. Through this, Gray realizes that Carcetti is running for mayor without his knowledge or input. After Carcetti publicly launches his campaign, Gray ends both their alliance and their friendship. Carcetti's speech relies heavily on "war" rhetoric, which clashes with Colvin's view that such perspectives have made the war on drugs unwinnable.

=== Season 4 ===
Carcetti continues his campaign, with D'Agostino serving as his strategist while Norman Wilson, a former editor at The Baltimore Sun, becomes his campaign manager. When early polls show low numbers for Carcetti, he assumes that he has already lost on the basis of his race and begins to lose interest in the campaign. He chooses not to prepare for an upcoming debate with Royce and Gray, believing that he could win the debate but still lose the election regardless.

However, Carcetti's debate performance is invigorated when he learns from Valchek that a state's witness was recently murdered. He uses this inside information and his previous request for a witness protection scheme to ambush Royce to great effect. Carcetti persuades Gray to publicly criticize Royce with the promise of a prominent council position in exchange for taking a large share of the African-American vote.

His confidence restored, Carcetti hits the campaign trail with renewed vigor, receiving assistance from State Delegate Odell Watkins, who has turned against Royce. Thanks to his alliance with Watkins, Carcetti defeats Royce in a close Democratic primary election. In a city with a 9 to 1 Democratic advantage, Carcetti easily defeats a Republican named Crawford in the general election with 81% of the vote.

As mayor-elect, Carcetti immediately makes changes before his inauguration. After discussions with city officials, he decides to replace Burrell as BPD commissioner, planning to attract outside candidates while asking Burrell to resign. Burrell quickly realizes what is happening and rallies support from City Council President Nerese Campbell, corrupt State Senator Clay Davis, and a group of influential black ministers. Burrell orders an increase in arrests at Davis' suggestion, hoping to prove that the BPD is functioning well under his leadership. A frustrated Carcetti restricts Burrell's authority and insists that he clear his orders through Deputy Commissioner William Rawls.

Major Cedric Daniels, a politically neutral African-American district commander, impresses Carcetti with his interest in securing quality felony arrests instead of statistically based reductions in crime. Carcetti offers Daniels a promotion to the Criminal Investigations Division and an automatic promotion to the rank of colonel. Through Daniels, Carcetti learns of Burrell's arrest hike and consequently orders the BPD to reform its approach by prioritizing quality felony cases over statistical quotas.

Carcetti's plans for the BPD are derailed when he learns that Baltimore's schools face a $54 million budget deficit. He and Wilson travel to Annapolis in order to convince the governor to bail out the schools. The governor agrees on the condition that Carcetti face public humiliation by publicly admitting to eliciting his aid. Carcetti rejects the offer, as it would be damaging to his own planned campaign for governor; Wilson is left disappointed at Carcetti's decision to put his ambition ahead of the needs of the city. Carcetti justifies his decision by saying that he would be in a better place to help the city schools as governor.

Carcetti deals with a brutality complaint against BPD sergeant Thomas "Herc" Hauk. At Wilson and Rawls' suggestion, Carcetti decides to defer to Daniels, Herc's former commanding officer, who decides that a reprimand for excessive force is sufficient punishment. Burrell approaches Carcetti to suggest that a more rigorous review of Herc is needed. Herc is forced to leave the BPD as an eventual result. Burrell is finally able to prove his usefulness to Carcetti by exploiting his political intellect, but Carcetti continues to consult Daniels on policing strategy.

=== Season 5 ===
Carcetti's decision to reject the governor's bailout leaves him with intractable budget problems. He is forced to cut spending in other areas in order to plug the schools' budget deficit and is unable to keep his promises to reform the BPD. Despite the problems facing the city, Carcetti remains focused on running for governor two years into his term. Carcetti meets with Burrell and Rawls to discuss the BPD's problems, becoming concerned with crime statistics despite his prior decision to discourage stat-based policing. Morale in the BPD is at a low because Carcetti is withholding payment of overtime. The commissioners convince him to lift a cap on secondary employment for officers in order to improve their morale.

Carcetti's new chief of staff, Michael Steintorf, replaces Wilson as his primary advisor. The mayor faces criticism from Wilson but still seeks his counsel. Meanwhile, he meets with the U.S. Attorney to discuss federal assistance in the vacant murders case. The U.S. Attorney, a Republican, desires federal handling of a corruption investigation against Davis. Carcetti refuses because he is worried it will be used to discredit Baltimore's Democratic Party.

Carcetti, intent on running for governor, alienates Watkins with his lack of attention to the city. Carcetti considers the prospect of being replaced by Campbell, who has become tainted by a corruption scandal. Elsewhere, Rawls leaks BPD statistics to Carcetti showing a rising crime rate. When Burrell delivers manipulated statistics to Carcetti, the mayor finally has the political ammunition needed to have him fired. Carcetti plans to replace Burrell with Daniels, but is worried that he will not be accepted by Campbell and the ministers. He plans to temporarily promote Rawls to acting commissioner while Daniels prepares for the role as Deputy Commissioner of Operations. Carcetti leaks news of the plan to the press via Wilson to test the waters.

Carcetti offers favors to Campbell and the ministers to accept his plans for the BPD. Carcetti grants Campbell permission for the demolition of the McCullough homes, a housing project that is adjacent to Andy Krawczyk's latest building development. Campbell convinces Burrell to leave office quietly by promising him a lucrative replacement position. Carcetti reluctantly accepts the deal when Campbell hints that Burrell has knowledge of corrupt activity in Daniels' past, but Carcetti remains unaware of the specifics. Carcetti officially announces his plans for the BPD at a press conference.

In the end of series montage, it is shown that Carcetti's political machinations have succeeded and he has been elected governor of Maryland. Campbell, as the city council president, succeeds him as mayor for the remainder of his term. Rawls and Valchek are promoted to superintendent of the Maryland State Police and commissioner of the BPD, respectively.

== Critical response ==
Was there any Baltimorean ... who didn't think Carcetti bore an undeniable resemblance to O'Malley?

— David Zurawik, The Baltimore Sun

Entertainment Weekly named Carcetti one of the five most interesting characters in season four.

== Character inspiration ==
A fictionalized version of the events of the 1999 Baltimore mayoral election were presented in the third and fourth seasons of The Wire, which aired in 2004 and 2006, respectively. Many saw the connection between Carcetti and Martin O'Malley, an Irish-American Baltimore City Councillor who was elected mayor, defeating two African American opponents. Carlos Watson of MSNBC once introduced O'Malley as "one of the real-life inspirations for the mayor of the hit TV show The Wire", to which O'Malley responded that he was instead the show's "antidote".

Show creator David Simon denied that the character of Tommy Carcetti was supposed to be O'Malley. Simon did acknowledge that O'Malley was "one of several inspirations" for Carcetti. He further stated that while Carcetti was "reflective" of O'Malley, Carcetti was a composite drawing aspects from other local politicians that he had covered when he worked as a reporter for The Baltimore Sun. In 2018, show writer William F. Zorzi said that Carcetti was "based in part on O'Malley" and "a number" of other politicians.
