= William Rawls =

Character from The Wire

William A. Rawls
- The Wire character
- John Doman as William Rawls
- First appearance: "The Target" (2002)
- Last appearance: "–30–" (2008)
- Created by: David Simon
- Portrayed by: John Doman

In-universe information
- Gender: Male
- Title(s): Acting Commissioner; MSP Superintendent
- Occupation: Baltimore Police Department Major (season 1); Baltimore Police Department Colonel (season 2); Baltimore Police Department Deputy Commissioner of Operations (seasons 3–5); Acting Commissioner of the Baltimore Police Department/MSP Superintendent (season 5)

William A. "Bill" Rawls is a fictional character on the HBO drama The Wire, played by actor John Doman. Over the course of the series, Rawls ascends through the higher ranks of the Baltimore Police Department, eventually becoming Deputy Commissioner of Operations and, at the end of Season 5, Superintendent of the Maryland State Police.

His careerism and deft political maneuvering are generally portrayed as detrimental to the department and the work of officers under his command; seen, for example, in his regular attempts to offload difficult case-work to other divisions or departments, or shut down investigations in order to keep 'stats' down.

When Rawls is promoted to Deputy Commissioner, he is put in charge of the weekly ComStat meetings, a platform which he uses to bully and berate the commanders under his authority. He is a 'no-nonsense' leader who obstinately refuses to allow anything that might harm his career, regardless of benefit to the department. Little is disclosed of Rawls' personal life aside from incidental allusions to his sexuality, wife and children.

== Biography ==
=== Season 1 ===
Rawls is a major and commanding officer of the Homicide Unit in Season 1. He is only concerned with maintaining the case clearance record of his unit, and is extremely demanding of his detectives. He is upset when Jimmy McNulty bypasses him to Judge Phelan to encourage further investigation of the Barksdale Organization.

At the request for manpower and instruction of Deputy Commissioner Ervin Burrell, Rawls sends McNulty and Michael Santangelo to Lt. Cedric Daniels' Barksdale detail as they are the two "humps" he no longer wants. Santangelo is used as Rawls' inside man in the Barksdale detail. Rawls relies upon Sergeant Jay Landsman to handle much of his communication with the men under his command in homicide.

McNulty placates Rawls by working several old murder cases, linking them all to the same gun and to D'Angelo Barksdale. Rawls wants to immediately issue a warrant for D'Angelo, but McNulty is wary since prematurely arresting him will tip off his uncle Avon to their investigation. The detail persuades Daniels to fight Rawls' push for arrests.

Eventually, Daniels goes over Rawls' head and meets with Burrell, convincing him to suspend the warrants. An infuriated Rawls demands that Santangelo either clear a case by day's end, inform on McNulty, or leave the unit altogether due to his low clearance rate. McNulty and Bunk Moreland save Santangelo by clearing one of his open cases while sending him on a trip to a phony gypsy named "Madame LaRue".

Following the shooting of Detective Kima Greggs in a buy bust gone wrong, Rawls becomes personally involved in the investigation. His first action is to order all non-essential personnel, including Greggs' friends in her detail, to evacuate the crime scene. He later speaks to a distraught McNulty and while he again expresses his hatred for his subordinate, he reassures him that he was not ultimately responsible for the shooting. When McNulty convinces Daniels to go around his superiors and try to involve the FBI in the Barksdale case, Rawls reassigns McNulty to the BPD's marine unit, replaces him with Detective Lester Freamon, and transfers Santangelo to the Western District as a beat officer.

=== Season 2 ===
Rawls gets promoted to colonel, partly based on McNulty's work on the Barksdale case. When McNulty comes across a floater while on marine patrol, Rawls manages to convince the neighboring Baltimore County Police Department that the case belongs to them. McNulty uses wind and tide charts to prove that the death occurred in Rawls' jurisdiction. When thirteen dead women turn up in a cargo container at the ports, Rawls again tries to avoid responsibility for the investigation, McNulty again finds proof that the deaths fell under Rawls' jurisdiction and puts it into a report. Rawls has Sergeant Jay Landsman assign the case to Freamon and Bunk replacing Detective Ray Cole aa the investigator, because he believes they are the best investigators in his squad and because of their friendship with Mcnulty.

When Daniels' detail is re-formed to investigate stevedore union leader Frank Sobotka, Rawls signs off on every officer Daniels wants from his original Barksdale detail, except for McNulty. Rawls pressures Daniels to investigate the fourteen murders; Daniels initially refuses in order to keep the case simple, but later accepts due to persuasion from Freamon.

In exchange, he has Rawls promise to give him anything necessary to solve the murders. When Daniels demands McNulty, Rawls is ultimately forced to transfer him out of marine patrol back to Daniels' unit. Rawls thus allows McNulty to be Daniels' responsibility, but will not let him any further back into the Homicide Unit.

The fourteen murder cases prove to be a boon for Rawls, as Daniels' team clears all of them at the end of season two.

=== Season 3 ===
With Burrell's promotion to Commissioner, Rawls is promoted to Deputy Commissioner of Operations in his place. During weekly CompStat meetings with the BPD's district commanders, Rawls relentlessly interrogates them about how they are handling crime rates in their respective jurisdictions. While Rawls berates several shift commanders over the season, he commends others like Daniels on numerous occasions as the type of commander he sees as both dedicated and competent.

When Brother Mouzone sends Lamar into a gay bar to search for Omar Little, Rawls is shown briefly in the background, out of uniform and holding a drink, with a smile on his face and apparently at ease in the environment. This suggests that Rawls is likely a closeted gay or bisexual man, as he is married with a family, and disclosing such information could harm his career.

When Howard "Bunny" Colvin reveals Hamsterdam to his colleagues and superiors during a CompStat meeting Rawls publicly berates Colvin, but confides the following meeting with him and Burrell that it is "insane and illegal, but stone...brilliant nonetheless", and applauds him for attaining significant results.

During the shutdown of Hamsterdam, Rawls personally orders the mobilization of the Quick Response Team (QRT) and drives into the thick of it with his car radio playing Richard Wagner's Ride of the Valkyries, echoing the renowned helicopter scene from the film Apocalypse Now, defying Colvin's request that no mass arrests occur and also denying Daniels a QRT unit for taking down the Barksdale organization.

=== Season 4 ===
Rawls is Burrell's first port of call when subpoenas issued by the Major Crimes Unit upset State Senator Clay Davis and Mayor Clarence Royce. Rawls suggests that Freamon is the most likely source of the problem and recommends that the unit get proper supervision. Rawls thus transfers hostile lieutenant Charles Marimow to head the MCU.

Marimow's caustic leadership results in an immediate shutdown of the unit's drug-money tracing activities and a return to street level investigations. Rawls preempts a rebellion from Freamon by threatening his colleagues and offering him a transfer back to Homicide and also facilitates Greggs' transfer from the MCU to Homicide as a favor for Daniels.

Rawls displays his great political acumen when Burrell mistakenly assigns Greggs to the politically sensitive murder of a state's witness to slow the investigation down on Royce's behalf. He allows Burrell's plan to proceed and, when it is leaked to the press, Burrell falls out of Royce's favor. Rawls tells Royce that he did not act differently as he is a loyal subordinate who always follows his boss's orders. Looking to replace Burrell, Royce asks Rawls if he is ready to take command after Burrell's mistake, telling Rawls that if he fixes this situation, Royce will keep his actions on hand.

Rawls also endears himself to Tommy Carcetti's campaign for mayor. He receives word from a contact in Royce's security detail that the mayor has fallen out with State Delegate Odell Watkins. Rawls feeds this information to Carcetti so that he can recruit Watkins's support, and asks Carcetti to remember him if he is elected. Rawls then assures the election goes smoothly by interfering with the dead witness case, reassigning Ed Norris and Greggs to election duty for the day as the department is 20 officers short of duty.

Carcetti is elected mayor and begins trying to make the department more productive. He observes the department and work and sees an unmotivated investigation unit and petty drug arrests and then comes to Rawls. When Carcetti asks Rawls about the problems in the department, Rawls claims that affirmative action and pressure from the mayor's office has made policing a numbers game.

He states that to appease the voters and have a department that reflects the city's demographics, a 20% hike in the number of African American officers is required. He says this has occurred up the chain of command as well as in the academy and the early promotions have put inexperienced officers who are more trained to handle statistical values than they are to set out good policing strategies in command positions. Rawls claims that if it were up to him, he would focus on high end drug enforcement, a claim that Daniels (an African American commander who Rawls does view as "good police") does not believe.

Despite being a loyal subordinate, Rawls develops a power struggle with Burrell over who controls the activity in the department. Rawls is commanded to control day-to-day activity by Carcetti. Carcetti has no faith in Burrell's capacity to change the department's problems. Burrell is threatened by Rawls, allowing the promotion of Daniels from Major to Colonel at the Mayor's request. Daniels is the most apparent threat within the department to dethroning Burrell as Commissioner.

Rawls does not realize that Daniels could be promoted ahead of him until Valchek points out the hindrance of Rawls' Caucasian race, specifically due to Baltimore's African American majority and the fact that the black community will only accept a white Commissioner if there is a black Mayor, or vice versa. The political irony of season 4 is that Rawls helped Carcetti beat Royce in the election with the Watkins information, when it's likely that Rawls would have been named Commissioner if Royce had been reelected.

=== Season 5 ===
Rawls continues to serve as Deputy Commissioner for Operations and begins to work amiably with Commissioner Ervin Burrell again. Mayor Tommy Carcetti severely strains the department by cutting their funding and failing to deliver on his promises to initiate change. Rawls has to deal with extremely low morale amongst all officers, and Carcetti still expects him to have the crime rate reduced.

Rawls and Burrell continue to manipulate their statistics, but Carcetti discovers the altered statistics, obtaining the political ammunition he has been waiting for to fire Burrell, and plans to move Rawls to acting commissioner while preparing Cedric Daniels to take over the post permanently. The transitions in the police department are officially announced at a press conference attended by Carcetti, Burrell, Rawls and Daniels.

In the series finale, Rawls is seen being sworn in as the Superintendent of the Maryland State Police as a reward for his loyalty to Carcetti and his allowing Valchek to become commissioner.

== Origins ==
Rawls' distinctive manner of intimidating subordinates is based on real-life Baltimore CID commander Joe Cooke. Simon has also commented that Rawls' attitude towards the murder rate and his unit's clearance record is a product of the extreme pressure he is under.
