= Herc (The Wire) =

Character from The Wire

Thomas Hauk
- The Wire character
- Domenick Lombardozzi as Herc
- First appearance: "The Target" (2002)
- Last appearance: "-30-" (2008)
- Created by: David Simon
- Portrayed by: Domenick Lombardozzi

In-universe information
- Alias: Herc
- Title: Private Investigator
- Occupation: Criminal Defense Investigator, former Baltimore Police Sergeant

Thomas "Herc" Hauk is a fictional character on the HBO drama The Wire, played by Domenick Lombardozzi. The series introduces Herc as a detective in the Baltimore Police Department's Narcotics Unit, begrudgingly detailed to the initial Barksdale investigation. He is generally portrayed as encapsulating the failings of the contemporary Baltimore police officer: simple-minded, concerned with petty street arrests and minor drug charges, and priding himself and his colleagues on banging heads "the Western District way".

He is also the partner and best friend of Ellis Carver, the two rarely being unpaired until later seasons. Following his promotion to sergeant, he is dismissed from the force, subsequently finding employment as a private investigator for attorney—and invariant legal advisor for drug organizations—Maurice Levy.

== Biography ==
=== Season 1 ===
Herc and Carver work in Narcotics with Detective Kima Greggs. All three join the Barksdale detail headed by their shift lieutenant, Cedric Daniels. Herc and Carver get into trouble early in the investigation when, along with Roland Pryzbylewski, they drunkenly charge into a Barksdale-controlled housing project and harass a group of youths. While there, Prez pistol whips one of the youths, blinding him in one eye and nearly inciting a riot. Herc is slightly injured when angry residents throw bottles and fire at the officers, but returns early from his sick leave to take part in raids on the Barksdale operation.

When young dealer Bodie Broadus punches Pat Mahon during a raid, Herc, Carver and Greggs give him a beating. When Bodie later escapes from a juvenile detention center, Herc and Carver rearrest him and beat him again when he remains defiant. Even so, the three play pool together when they find themselves having to wait hours to hand Bodie over. Herc's character is also humanized somewhat when, in a failed attempt to arrest Bodie at his grandmother's house, he apologizes to her for his rough language and listens politely as she discusses Bodie's troubled past.

When Herc and Carver intercept the Barksdale crew's profits for a day by tailing Wee-Bey Brice, Herc considers keeping some of the money, but Carver realizes that figures mentioned on the wiretap might leave them exposed. Some of the money still goes missing when the bag rips in their trunk. After Daniels confronts them about the missing money, Carver begins to suspect Herc has stolen it, until it is found in the spare-wheel well of the car. Daniels assumes they simply stole and then returned the money. Later, while raiding a drug stash in Pimlico, Herc and Carver do steal money for themselves.

With little study, Herc takes and passes the sergeant's exam, placing 18th on the list of passing officers. After celebrating, he finds out that he will not in fact be promoted, likely because of prior allegations of police brutality. However, Carver, who ranked much lower than Herc on the exam, is promoted to Sergeant; it's implied that Carver's promotion is a reward for acting as Deputy Commissioner Ervin Burrell's spy within the detail.

=== Season 2 ===
When the detail is disbanded, Herc moves back to Narcotics, investigating white East Baltimore dealers. Daniels brings Herc into Stan Valchek's detail investigating stevedore union boss Frank Sobotka, recognizing Herc's stomach for the tedium of surveillance work. As suggested by Herc, Daniels also brings Carver back but refuses to recognize his promotion; Kima remains the lead detective for the details. As Herc and Carver begin investigating the drug dealing around the docks area, Herc plays the key undercover role and deals with the mostly white dealers in the Polish neighborhoods of Baltimore.

Herc and Carver conceal a high-priced listening device within a tennis ball to gain information. When the device is damaged, they fabricate a confidential informant named "Fuzzy Dunlop" (an inside joke between them referencing the tennis ball's texture and manufacturer) and take payments meant for the informant to cover its cost. Through their surveillance, they are able to establish a link between Frank's nephew Nick and the drug trade. Herc feels unappreciated, as he and Carver are constantly relied upon to do tedious leg work for the detail. After being left out in the rain waiting for Nick after he had already turned himself in, Herc convinces Carver they will never be respected in Daniels's unit. They put in for a transfer.

=== Season 3 ===
Herc and Carver work in the Western District under Major Howard "Bunny" Colvin. With Carver in charge, they are responsible for running the district's Drug Enforcement Unit and commanding a squad of dedicated plainclothes narcotics cops, including Kenneth Dozerman, Lloyd "Truck" Garrick, Lambert and Anthony Colicchio. The DEU is put in charge of policing Colvin's unsanctioned free drug trade zones, nicknamed "Hamsterdam". Herc is critical of Colvin's project, especially after rejecting Carver's request to help him move a homicide victim off the free zone premises, and eventually leaks details on Hamsterdam to The Baltimore Sun. When the national media begins covering the story, Hamsterdam is shut down and Colvin is forced to retire.

=== Season 4 ===
While Carver stays in the Western and turns a new leaf after taking Colvin's advice, Herc begins working on the security details for Mayor Clarence Royce. At one point, he accidentally catches Royce receiving fellatio from a secretary. Carver sets Herc up for a meeting with the politically savvy Valchek, who encourages Herc to take advantage of the situation and quickly make rank. Herc meets with Royce, who calls now-Commissioner Burrell to have him promoted to sergeant in exchange for his silence. Herc is transferred to the Major Crimes Unit under Lieutenant Charles Marimow, but soon loses his "rabbi" when Royce loses to Tommy Carcetti in the Democratic mayoral primary. He and Marimow clash over methods, and Herc shows no respect for his leadership abilities.

Herc takes a police camera to spy on drug kingpin Marlo Stanfield without Marimow or a court's approval. Marlo's crew realize they are being filmed and give false information (prompting Herc to detain an innocent woman) and then steal the camera. Herc attributes the fake information to "Fuzzy Dunlop". Herc panics about the lost camera, as he took it without permission, and his attribution of the information gained from the camera to a made-up informant is a grave misstep as it did not yield any criminal charges. Marimow eventually figures out that Dunlop is a red herring and warns Herc he will "hand out the sandwiches at your execution" when it is proven. Before he can do anything to prove Herc's misconduct he is transferred.

Herc starts harassing dealers indiscriminately to get them to return the camera, fearful that its loss will lead to his demotion from sergeant. While attempting to retrieve the camera, Herc interviews Randy Wagstaff, who has knowledge about the murder of Lex, one of Bodie's drug dealers. Carver tells Herc to deliver Randy to Bunk in homicide in order to protect Randy. Instead, Herc mistakenly reveals Randy's cooperation to a conspirator to the murder, Little Kevin. Marlo finds out about Randy's interview and subsequently puts word out on the street that Randy is a snitch.

This series of mistakes by Herc eventually leads to Randy being beaten repeatedly at school so that he needs to be kept at home, until finally some guys seeking to punish him throw a molotov cocktail into his foster mother's house, badly injuring her and leading to Randy being put in a group home, where his snitch label follows him and leads to more beatings. Carver tries to help Randy, but is stymied by the system. Herc's mistake also causes a coldness to develop between Carver and Herc because Carver cannot forgive him for what happened to Randy.

Still attempting to retrieve the camera, Herc pulls over Chris Partlow and Snoop, finding a nailgun which ultimately proves to be an important clue for Lester Freamon's investigation into the murders of Lex and Little Kevin. Herc however fails to confiscate anything in the car, or find the firearms in the hidden compartments, Chris anticipating that further police encounters may come disposes of the incriminating items in the car.

Greggs, now in Homicide and no longer in need of a drugs informant, puts Bubbles in touch with Herc. However, Herc repeatedly fails to help Bubbles with his problems, leading Bubbles to give him bad information which ends with Herc's arrest of a politically influential black minister. The ministers pressure the newly elected Mayor Carcetti, who is caught between a rock and a hard place: if he fires Herc, he alienates the police union, but if he keeps him on, he will alienate the ministers.

Burrell comes up with a third option by pushing IID into looking into Herc's past wrongdoings in order to find a pretext for discharging him. Herc is suspended with pay pending a full trial. The IID board delivers a verdict of "conduct unbecoming". Though it is left unclear, if Herc has been fired or has quit of his own accord.

=== Season 5 ===
Herc now works as an investigator for defense attorney Maurice Levy, who previously represented the Barksdale Organization. He is able to provide Levy with information from his contacts in the police, including Carver, but he is irritated when Levy takes on Stanfield as a client. Herc meets Carver for drinks and admits feelings of remorse for some of his actions as a police officer. He attempts to redeem himself by making a note of Stanfield's confidential phone number from Levy's Rolodex and handing it to Carver, who then passes it on to Freamon.

Later, over drinks, Herc tries to influence Carver into being lenient for Colicchio, after he has to be restrained from attacking a civilian. Carver explains his philosophy that all of their actions as police officers matter, reminding Herc of some of their mistakes. Carver specifically mentions Herc's actions with Randy Wagstaff. Herc relents and tells Carver to do what he feels he has to.

In the final episode, however, Herc pumps his police friends for information which he then shares with Levy, telling him that a wiretap has probably been used in the Stanfield investigation – a wiretap which Levy realizes must be illegal. This tip allows Levy to keep Stanfield out of prison. A grateful Levy tells Herc he has done well, bringing him an enormous amount of business by helping him to get Marlo Stanfield off, and he invites him to dinner at his home, as Herc is now mishpochah (Yiddish for "family").

Herc congratulates Carver on his promotion to lieutenant. He is last seen in the end-of-season montage at the bar buying drinks for his former colleagues.

== Production ==
Domenick Lombardozzi speaks with the accent of his native South Bronx, which producers did not believe Lombardozzi would be able to convincingly hide and so did not ask him to try, planning a future explanation as to why Herc was policing in Baltimore. Ultimately, in the fifth-season premiere episode, "More with Less", Herc mentions having come from the Bronx when he makes a reference to his hometown New York Yankees being historically more successful than the Baltimore Orioles.

== Reception ==
Salon described Herc and Carver as providing needed comic relief to the show and acting as a "bickering couple".
