= Von Blücher brothers =

Nazi German paratroopers killed in Crete in 1941

The von Blücher brothers (German: Gebrüder von Blücher) were three German brothers and paratroopers of the Luftwaffe who were killed in combat within hours of each other on 21 May 1941 during the Battle of Crete. They were the descendants of the famous Prussian Field Marshal Gebhard von Blücher, one of the victors in the Battle of Waterloo 1815.

== Names ==
- Wolfgang Henner Peter Lebrecht Graf von Blücher (31 January 1917 in Altengottern, Mühlhausen – 21 May 1941 near Heraklion)
- Leberecht Wilhelm Konstantin Wolf Axel Graf von Blücher (13 April 1922 in Fincken – 21 May 1941 near Heraklion)
- Hans-Joachim Gebhard Leberecht Graf von Blücher (23 October 1923 in Fincken – 21 May 1941 near Heraklion)

== Battle of Crete and deaths ==
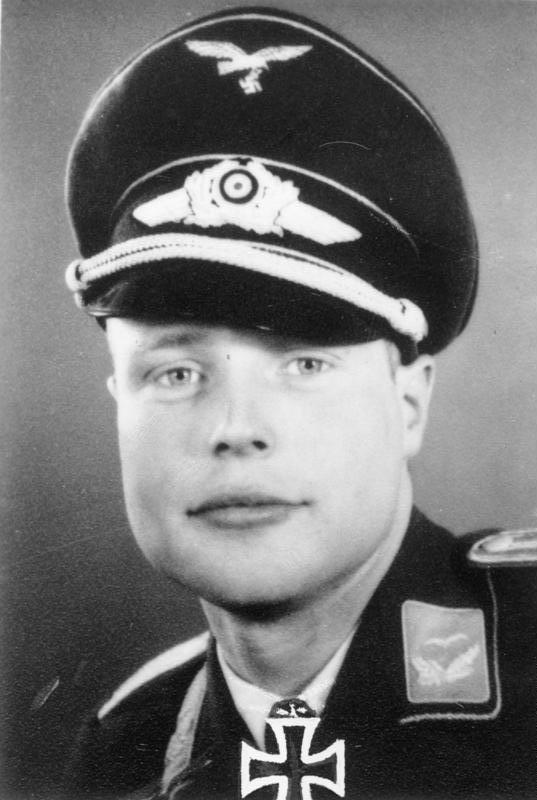
Wolfgang Graf von Blücher

On 21 May 1941 during the Battle of Crete Hans-Joachim Graf von Blücher attempted to resupply his brother, Oberleutnant Wolfgang Graf von Blücher, with ammunition when the latter and his platoon were surrounded by members of the British Black Watch. Hans-Joachim, who had arrived early morning with the second wave of paratroopers on his first active deployment, had commandeered a horse, which he attempted to gallop through British lines. He had almost reached his brother's position before he was shot and killed.

"...According to the account of the story, the Fallschirmjäger, running short of ammunition and medical supplies, were amazed to see a rider and horse galloping towards them with boxes of supplies. The soldiers of the Black Watch were similarly stunned and only fired at the last moment, hitting both horse and rider. Wolfgang von Blucher asked who the rider was, to be told it was his youngest brother Hans-Joachim, and that he was now dead ... For many years afterwards, a number of poor families living in a shanty village in the area reported seeing a ghostly horse and rider..."

Wolfgang and his men of the Fallschirmjägerregiment 1, ran out of ammunition. The rest of their platoon was overrun by British armoured vehicles and killed around midday.

Wolfgang’s younger brother, Leberecht Graf von Blücher, had also arrived with the second wave. He was reported killed in action on the same day but his body was never recovered.

== Fourth son ==
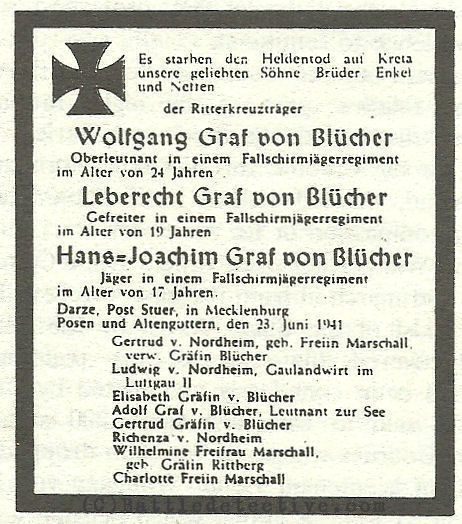
Obituary for the von Blücher brothers, German newspaper, June 1941

Four weeks after the battle the brothers' mother, Gertrud (Freiin Marschall) von Nordheim (widowed Gräfin von Blücher), who had lost her husband in 1924, was informed that three of her four sons had been killed on the same day in the Battle of Crete. Her fourth son, Adolf Graf von Blücher, was released from duty and left the German navy (Kriegsmarine) to take care of the agricultural firm at home. He was accidentally shot and killed in 1944 while hunting.

== Single grave ==
In 1974, Wolfgang and Hans-Joachim were re-interred in a single grave at the German War Cemetery on a hill behind the airfield at Maleme, Crete, which was newly inaugurated on 6 October in the presence of their sister Gertrud Freifrau von Ketelhodt and hundreds of guests from Germany. Because Leberecht’s body was never retrieved or identified, his name is on a plaque of honor (German: Ehrentafel) for the unknown fallen close to the grave of his brothers. Their sister named her sons after her brothers.

== See also ==
- Borgstrom brothers
- Niland brothers
- Sullivan brothers
- Rogers brothers
