= Condolences =

Expression of sympathy

Letter of condolence to Fanny McCullough

Sorrow comes to all; and, to the young, it comes with bitterest agony, because it takes them unawares. The older have learned to ever expect it. I am anxious to afford some alleviation of your present distress. Perfect relief is not possible, except with time. You can not now realize that you will ever feel better. Is not this so? And yet it is a mistake. You are sure to be happy again. To know this, which is certainly true, will make you some less miserable now. I have had experience enough to know what I say; and you need only to believe it, to feel better at once. The memory of your dear Father, instead of an agony, will yet be a sad sweet feeling in your heart, of a purer and holier sort than you have known before.

— U.S. President Abraham Lincoln
December 23, 1862

Condolences (from Latin con (with) + dolore (sorrow)) are an expression of sympathy to someone who is experiencing pain arising from death, deep mental anguish, or misfortune.

When individuals condole, or offer their condolences to a particular situation or person, they are offering active conscious support of that person or activity. This is often expressed by saying, "Sorry". Often, the English language expression "My condolences" will be in a context, such as of a friend's loved one, in which the one offering of condolences is communicating feelings of sympathy or empathy to that friend.

Condolence is not always expressed in sorrow or grievance, as it can also be used to acknowledge a fellow feeling or even a common opinion. There are various ways of expressing condolences to the victims. Examples include donating money to the charity nominated by the person who has just died, writing in a condolences book or supporting the friends and family of the loved one by making meals and looking after them in various ways in times of need.

A study from 2020 found that the specific words of condolence offered by doctors to grieving survivors can play a role in how those survivors fare in terms of subsequent mental health outcomes.

Messages of condolence are sometimes sent via telegram. In some European countries, that is considered a standard or a common way to offer condolences. It is similar in Japan.

== See also ==
- Consolation
- Mourning
- Thoughts and prayers
