= Niland brothers =

American brothers who served in World War II

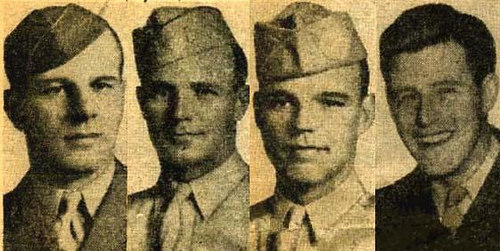
The Niland brothers; from left to right: Edward, Preston, Robert, and Frederick

The Niland brothers were four American brothers from Tonawanda, New York, who served in the military during World War II. They were sons of Mr. and Mrs. Michael C. Niland. Two survived the war but, for a time, only one, Frederick "Fritz" Niland, was believed to have survived. After the reported deaths of his three brothers, Fritz was sent back to the United States to complete his service, and only later learned that his brother Edward, missing and presumed dead, was captive in a Japanese POW camp in Burma.

== Brothers ==
- Technical Sergeant Edward Francis Niland (December 22, 1912 – February 28, 1984), U.S. Army Air Forces: Imprisoned in a Japanese POW camp in Burma, he was captured on May 16, 1944, and liberated on May 4, 1945. After Edward's B-25 Mitchell was hit, he parachuted and wandered through the Burmese jungle before being taken prisoner. Edward lived in Tonawanda until his death in 1984 at the age of 71.
- Second Lieutenant Preston Thomas Niland (March 6, 1915 – June 7, 1944), 29, 22nd Infantry Regiment, 4th Infantry Division, was killed in action on June 7, 1944, in Normandy, at the Crisbecq Battery.
- Technical Sergeant Robert Joseph "Bob" Niland (February 2, 1919 – June 6, 1944), 25, D Company, 505th Parachute Infantry Regiment, 82nd Airborne Division was killed in action on June 6, 1944, in Normandy. He volunteered to stay behind with Corporal James Kelly and hold off a German advance while his company retreated from Neuville-au-Plain. He was killed while manning his machine gun; Corporal James Kelly survived.
- Sergeant Frederick William "Fritz" Niland (April 23, 1920 – December 1, 1983), H Company, 501st Parachute Infantry Regiment, 101st Airborne Division: Fritz was close friends with Warren Muck and Donald Malarkey, from E Company, 506th Parachute Infantry Regiment, 101st Airborne Division. Fritz fought through the first few days of the Normandy campaign. Nine days following D-Day, Fritz had gone to the 82nd Airborne Division to see his brother, Bob. Once he arrived at division, he was informed that Bob had been killed on D-Day. Fritz was shipped back to England, and finally, to the U.S., where he served as an MP in New York until the completion of the war. Fritz was awarded a Bronze Star for his service. This story is evidenced in Stephen Ambrose's book Band of Brothers, as well as from biographical data on Francis L. Sampson. Private James Ryan in the film Saving Private Ryan is loosely based on him. Fritz married Marilyn Hartnett Batt and they had two daughters, Catherine (Cate) and Mary. Fritz died in 1983 in San Francisco at the age of 63.

== Memorials ==
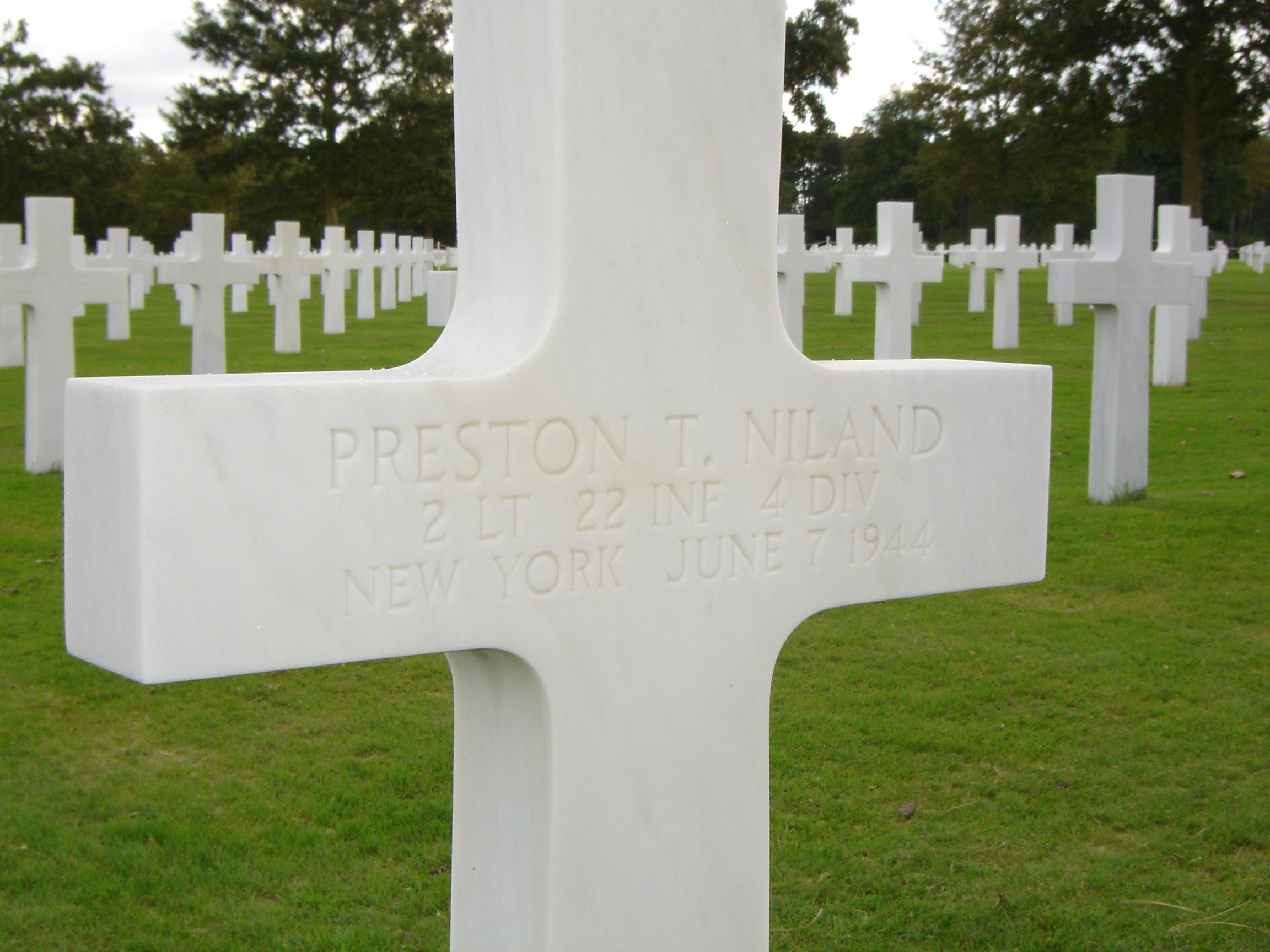
Preston T. Niland's grave marker at the American Cemetery near Colleville-sur-Mer, Normandy, France

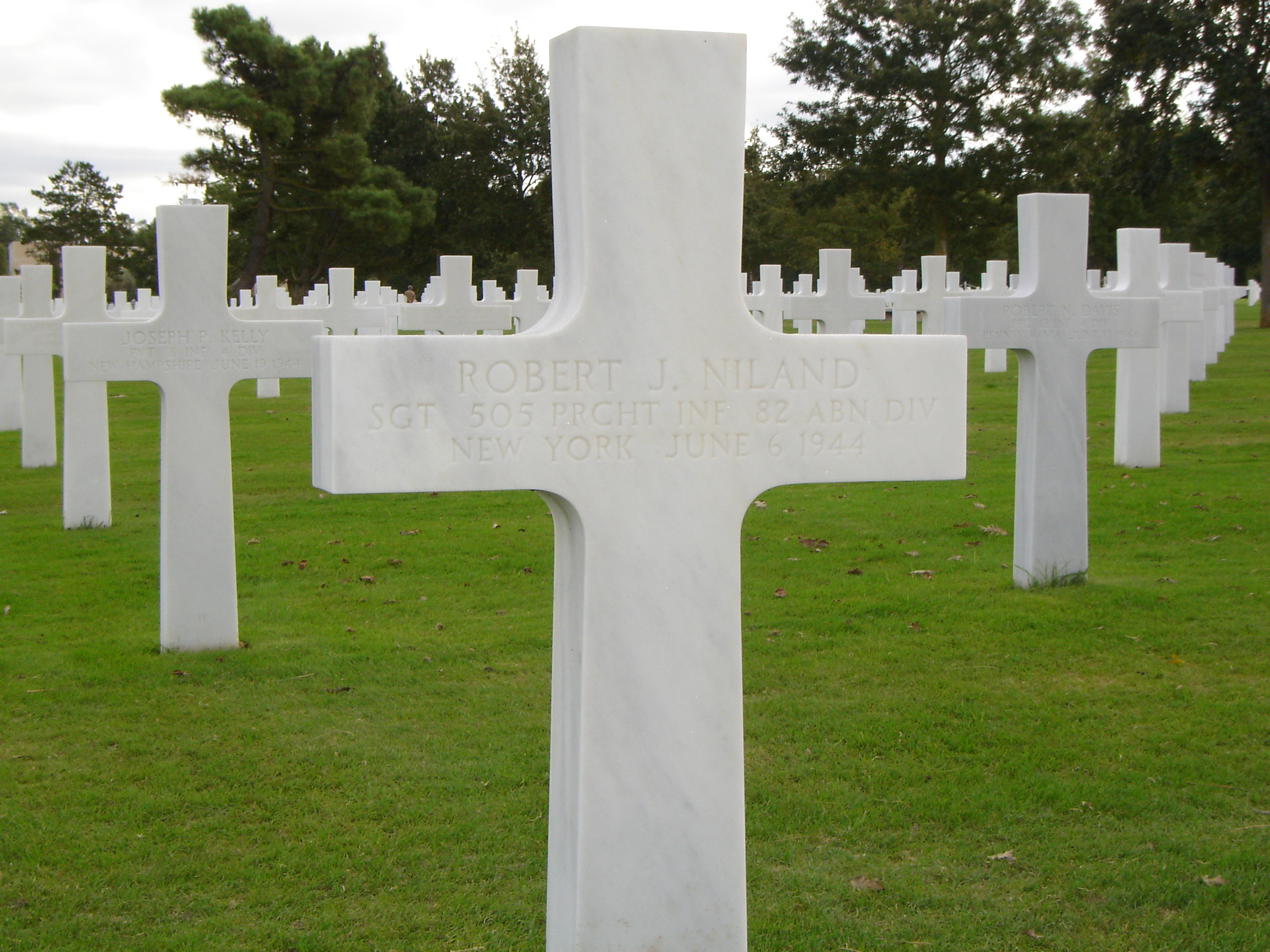
Robert J. Niland lies next to his brother Preston in the American Cemetery

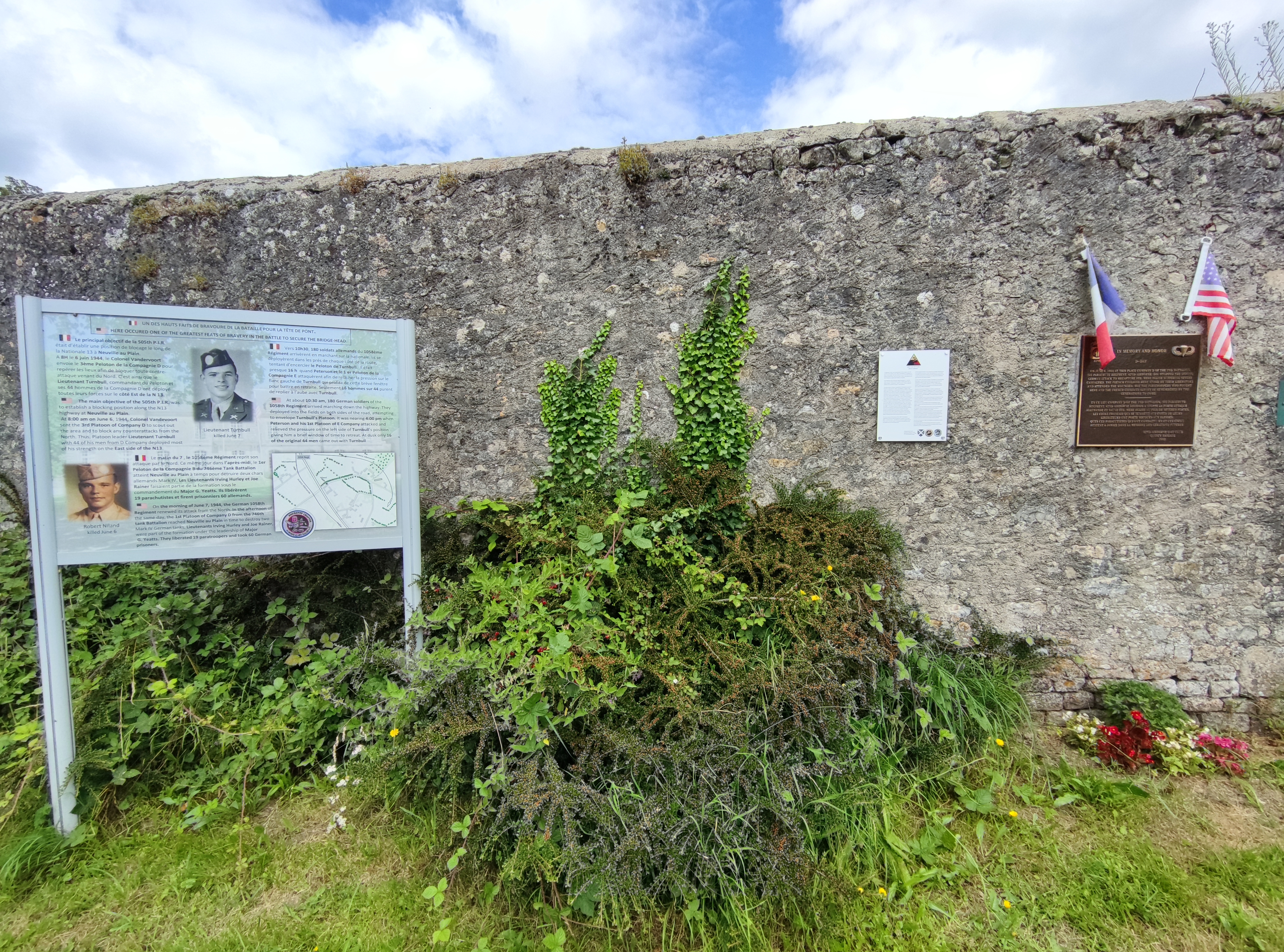
Memorial about Robert J. Niland in Neuville-au-Plain, France, where he was killed

== In popular culture ==
Steven Spielberg's 1998 film Saving Private Ryan is loosely based on the brothers' story.

== See also ==
- Bixby letter
- Borgstrom brothers
- Sullivan brothers
- Rogers brothers
- Brothers von Blücher, Germany's counterparts to the Niland/Sullivan Brothers
- Cervi Brothers
- Sole Survivor Policy
