= USS The Sullivans (DDG-68) =

Arleigh Burke-class destroyer

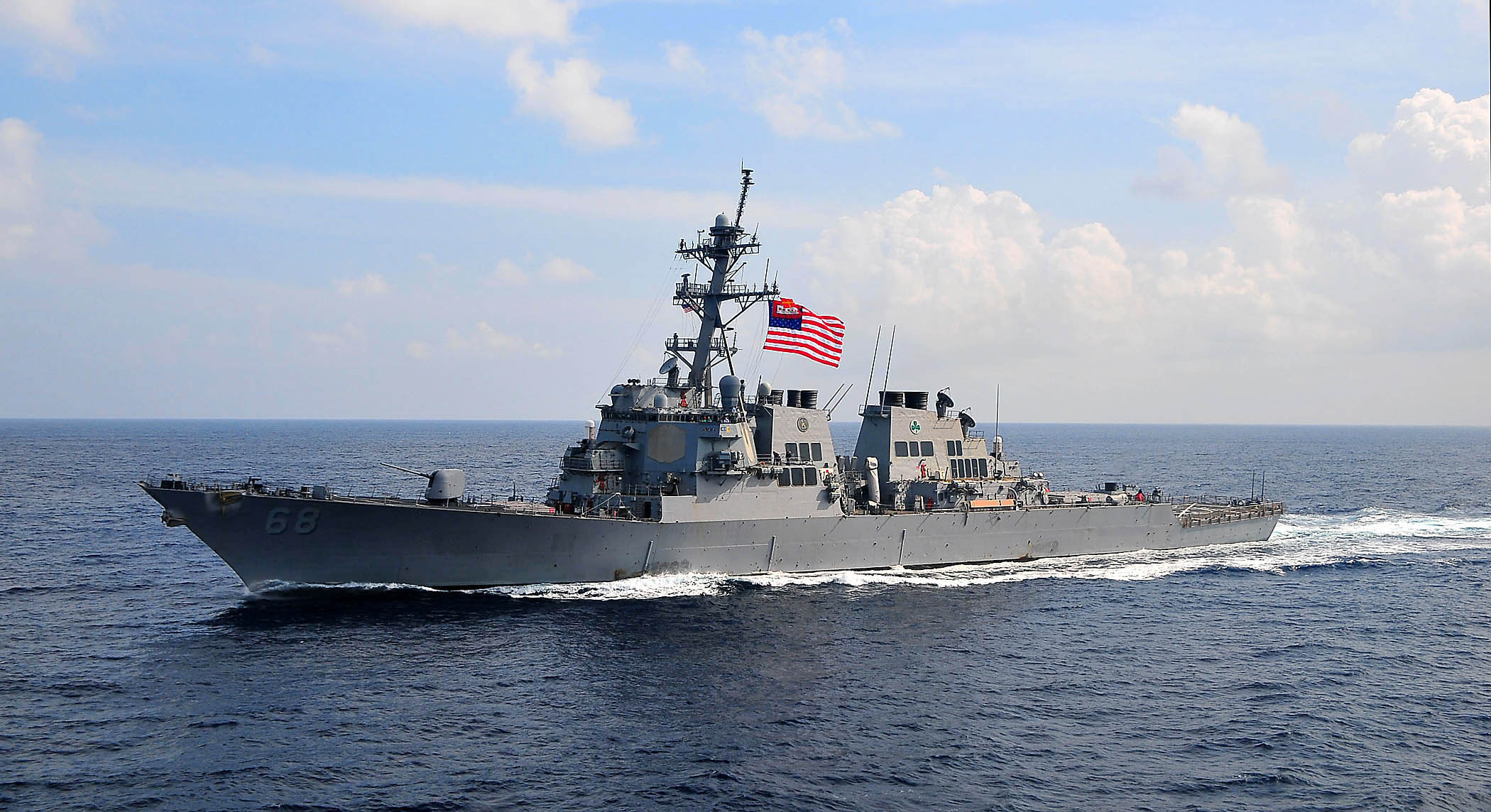
- USS The Sullivans on 13 February 2009

History

United States
- Name: The Sullivans
- Namesake: Sullivan brothers
- Ordered: 8 April 1992
- Builder: Bath Iron Works
- Laid down: 27 July 1994
- Launched: 12 August 1995
- Commissioned: 19 April 1997
- Home port: Mayport
- Identification: MMSI number: 367198000; Callsign: NSUL; Hull number: DDG-68
- Motto: Courage Honor Commitment; We Stick Together
- Status: in active service
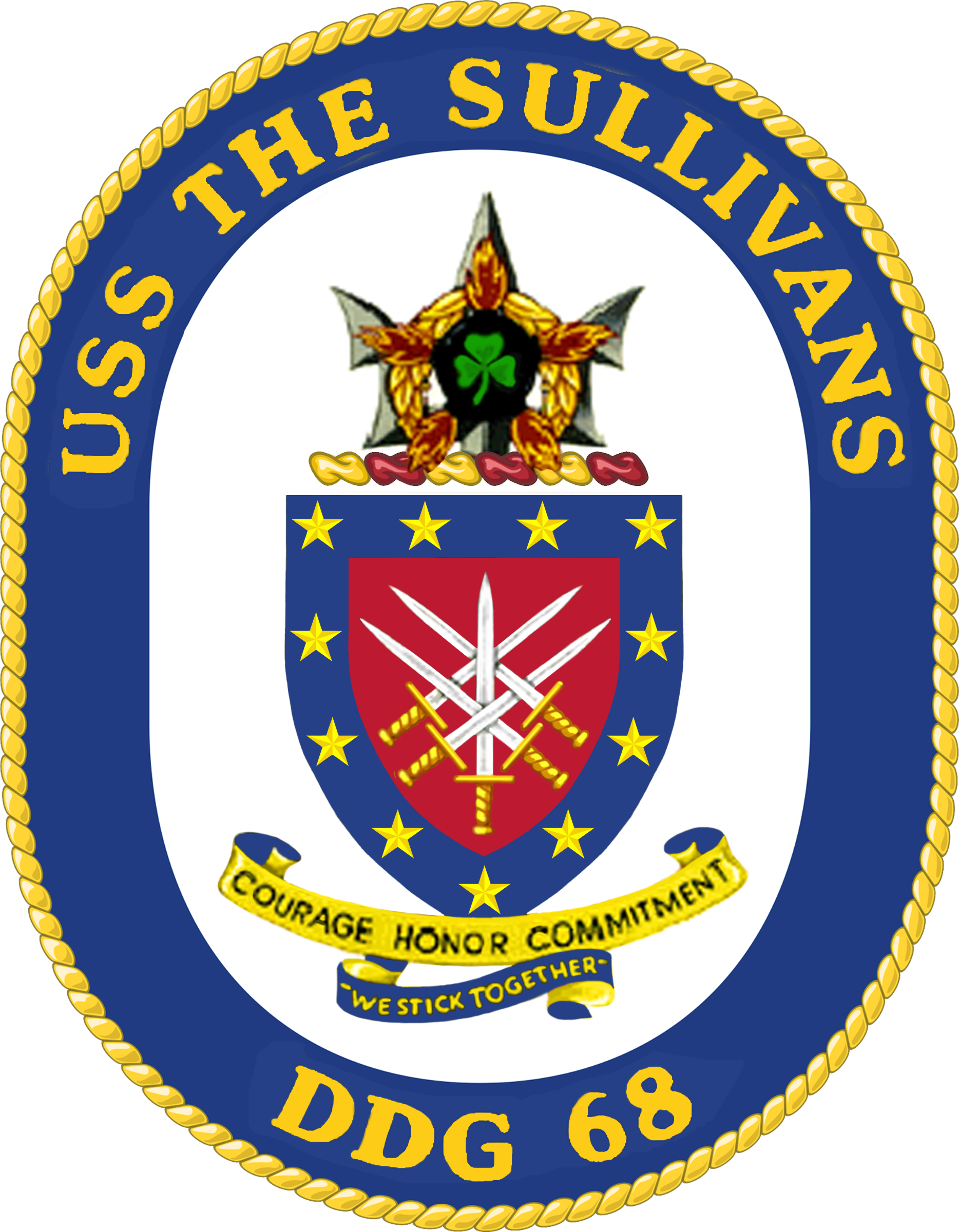
- Badge

General characteristics
- Class & type: Arleigh Burke-class destroyer
- Displacement: Light: approx. 6,800 long tons (6,900 t); Full: approx. 8,900 long tons (9,000 t)
- Length: 505 ft (154 m)
- Beam: 59 ft (18 m)
- Draft: 31 ft (9.4 m)
- Propulsion: 2 × shafts
- Speed: In excess of 30 kn (56 km/h; 35 mph)
- Range: 4,400 nmi (8,100 km; 5,100 mi) at 20 kn (37 km/h; 23 mph)
- Complement: 33 commissioned officers; 38 chief petty officers; 210 enlisted personnel
- Sensors & processing systems: AN/SPY-1D PESA 3D radar (Flight I, II, IIA); AN/SPY-6(V)1 AESA 3D radar (Flight III); AN/SPS-67(V)3 or (V)5 surface search radar (DDG-51 – DDG-118); AN/SPQ-9B surface search radar (DDG-119 onward); AN/SPS-73(V)12 surface search/navigation radar (DDG-51 – DDG-86); BridgeMaster E surface search/navigation radar (DDG-87 onward); 3 × AN/SPG-62 fire-control radar; Mk 46 optical sight system (Flight I, II, IIA); Mk 20 electro-optical sight system (Flight III); AN/SQQ-89 ASW combat system: AN/SQS-53C sonar array; AN/SQR-19 tactical towed array sonar (Flight I, II, IIA); TB-37U multi-function towed array sonar (DDG-113 onward); AN/SQQ-28 LAMPS III shipboard system
- Electronic warfare & decoys: AN/SLQ-32 electronic warfare suite; AN/SLQ-25 Nixie torpedo countermeasures; Mk 36 Mod 12 decoy launching systems; Mk 53 Nulka decoy launching systems; Mk 59 decoy launching systems
- Armament: Guns: 1 × 5-inch (127 mm)/54 mk 45 mod 1/2 (lightweight gun); 2 × 20 mm (0.8 in) Phalanx CIWS; 2 × 25 mm (0.98 in) Mk 38 machine gun system; 4 × 0.50 inches (12.7 mm) caliber guns; Missiles: 2 × Mk 141 Harpoon anti-ship missile launcher; 1 × 29-cell, 1 × 61-cell (90 total cells) Mk 41 vertical launching system (VLS): RIM-66M surface-to-air missile; RIM-156 surface-to-air missile; BGM-109 Tomahawk cruise missile; RUM-139 vertical launch ASROC; Torpedoes: 2 × Mark 32 triple torpedo tubes: Mark 46 lightweight torpedo; Mark 50 lightweight torpedo; Mark 54 lightweight torpedo
- Aircraft carried: 1 × Sikorsky MH-60R

USS The Sullivans (DDG-68) is an Arleigh Burke-class (Flight I) Aegis guided missile destroyer. She is the second ship of the United States Navy to be named for the five Sullivan brothers—George, Francis, Joseph, Madison, and Albert Sullivan, aged 20 to 27—who died when their ship, USS Juneau, was sunk by a Japanese submarine in November 1942 in the Naval Battle of Guadalcanal. This was the greatest military loss by any one American family during World War II.

The first ship named for the brothers was the Fletcher-class destroyer USS The Sullivans (DD-537), now a museum ship in Buffalo, New York.

== Construction ==
The contract to build The Sullivans was awarded to Bath Iron Works Corporation in Bath, Maine on 8 April 1992 and her keel was laid down on 27 July 1994. She was launched on 12 August 1995 and sponsored by Kelly Ann Sullivan Loughren, granddaughter of Albert Sullivan. The ship was commissioned on 19 April 1997. Upon her commissioning, the ship was given the motto that is thought to have been spoken by the brothers when asked to separate during World War II, "We Stick Together."

== Service history ==
=== 1990s ===
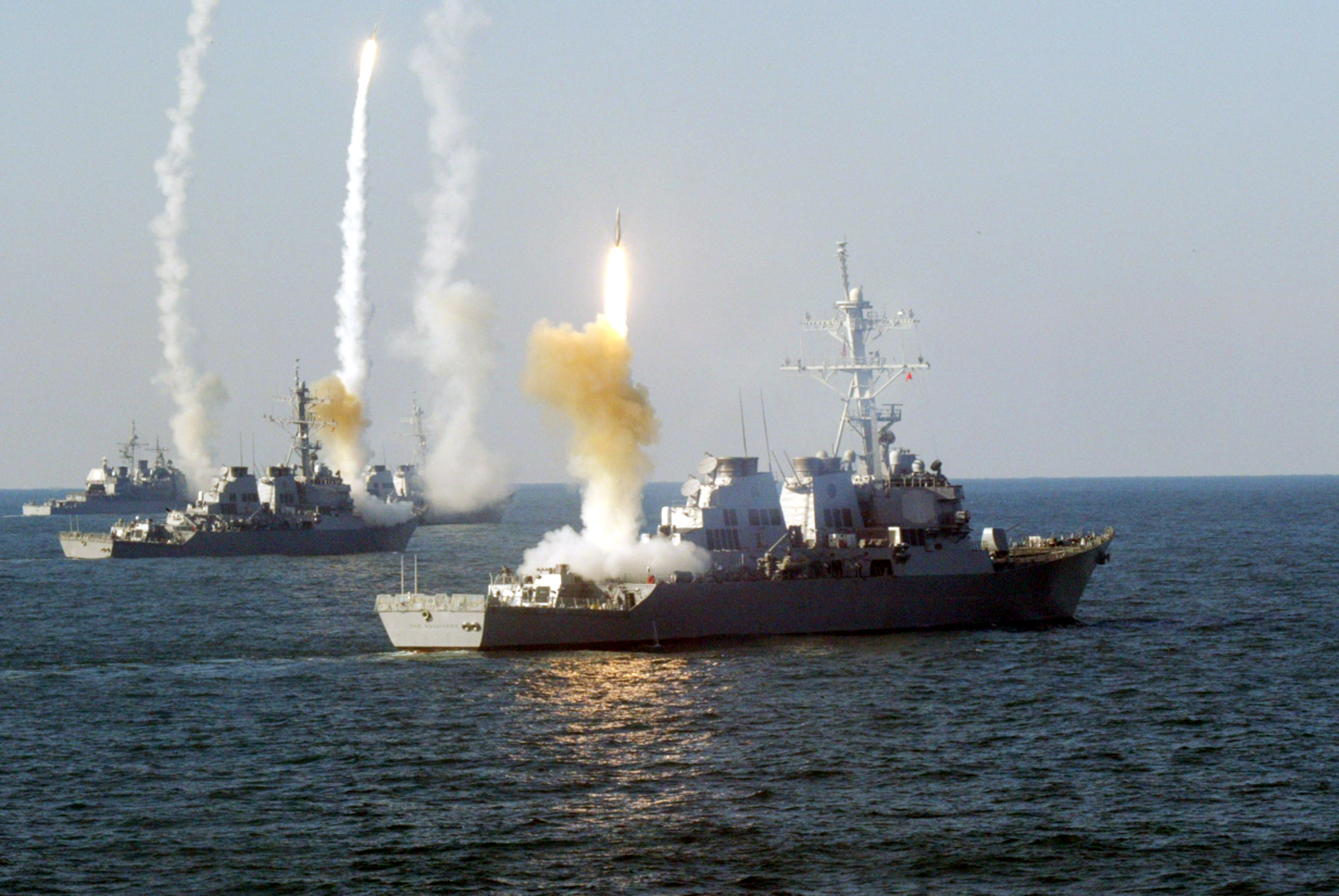
USS The Sullivans and other ships launch missiles in December 2003.

On 26 April 1997, The Sullivans departed New York City for Norfolk, Virginia, where, after arriving on 27 April, the crew completed underway replenishment qualifications with Platte. The warship then sailed for NS Mayport, Florida, on 29 April and arrived in her new homeport on 2 May.

After completing two days of gunnery trials in mid-May, The Sullivans embarked upon her shakedown deployment to the West Indies on 27 May. That cruise took her to the waters off Puerto Rico and the U.S. Virgin Islands, where the destroyer conducted numerous sonar, gunnery, and torpedo exercises. The warship also twice entered Roosevelt Roads and stopped once at St. Thomas, U.S. Virgin Islands for port visits. On 29 June, The Sullivans conducted test firings of Standard SM-2 ER missiles from her vertical launch system (VLS). After a brief stop at Mayport for the 4 July weekend, the warship joined other Arleigh Burke-class destroyers, cruisers, destroyers, and frigates off the Virginia Capes for a multiple-ship missile firing exercise. She returned to Mayport on 12 July for upkeep.

Following three days of damage control exercises in mid-August, the crew began preparations for a post shakedown availability. She sailed for Maine on 3 September, arriving at Bath Iron Works on 5 September. The shipyard repainted the hull, altered the superstructure, and installed equipment upgrades in the engineering plant and combat systems suite. When the yard work was completed The Sullivans got underway for Mayport, arriving there on 23 November.

On 8 December, the destroyer joined the aircraft carrier Enterprise off Georgia for a week of underway training. While providing plane guard services on 11 December, a T-45 Goshawk trainer aircraft crashed following take-off. The Sullivans made a high-speed dash to the site. While the carrier's rescue helicopter safely rescued the pilot, boats launched by The Sullivans picked up considerable pieces of wreckage which were helpful in determining the cause of the crash. The crew also completed helicopter deck landing qualifications before returning to port for the holidays on 12 December.

In January 1998, the crew of The Sullivans began a series of exercises designed "to build the capability for long-term self-sustained training onboard." They included engineering, combat, seamanship, and battle scenario training exercises. These local operations lasted until 18 May when the warship got underway for New York City and the annual "Fleet Week" celebrations.

Following a week-long port visit, The Sullivans got underway on 26 May for Halifax, Nova Scotia, to conduct training workups for the upcoming Exercise "Unified Spirit '98." During the exercise she joined an amphibious task force formed around USS Nassau, two Amphibious transport docks (LPDs), and two dock landing ships (LSDs). The warship screened the "gator" ships during an exercise focusing on multi-national peace enforcement operations. Ships from Canada, Great Britain, Germany, France, Norway, Denmark, Belgium, and Portugal also participated in the exercise. After this exercise, the ship visited Boston, Massachusetts, and then sailed with relatives and family for Mayport, arriving on 1 July.

After a summer of conducting midshipmen training off the Florida coast, Commander Roncolato was relieved by Commander E. Scott Hebner, USN, in a change of command ceremony on 4 September 1998. The Sullivans was then assigned to Destroyer Squadron 24, a component of the John F. Kennedy Battle Group. In 1999 the ship participated in various training exercises to prepare for her maiden deployment in October to the Mediterranean Sea.

=== 2000s ===
Later in 2000 she continued into the Arabian Sea, participating in exercises and boarding operations until late March. On 9 February 2000, Commander Daniel Paul Keller USN relieved Commander Heber in a change of command ceremony held at sea on station in the Persian Gulf.

After port visits in the Persian Gulf, The Sullivans returned through the Mediterranean Sea to her homeport in April 2000, successfully completing her first six-month deployment. After participating in BEACHFEST at Port Canaveral, Florida, The Sullivans underwent a major maintenance overhaul to prepare for future operations.

==== Attempted Al-Qaeda bombing ====
Members of al-Qaeda attempted an attack on The Sullivans while in port at Aden, Yemen on 3 January 2000 as a part of the 2000 millennium attack plots. The plan was to load a boat full of explosives and detonate it near The Sullivans; however the boat was so overladen that it sank. Later, al-Qaeda tried the same type of attack a second time, successfully bombing USS Cole on 12 October 2000.

==== September 11 attacks ====
While underway and sailing for Composite Unit Training Exercise 01-2 The Sullivans received word of the September 11 attacks. The Sullivans, as part of the John F. Kennedy Battle Group, took part in Operation Noble Eagle. The destroyer provided air-space security along the mid-Atlantic seaboard.

In February 2002 The Sullivans deployed with the John F. Kennedy Carrier battle group to the Arabian Sea in support of Operation Enduring Freedom.

=== 2010s ===
On 20 March 2010 as the ship entered the harbor at Manama, Bahrain she struck a harbor buoy and sustained between $200,000 and $1 million in damage. The ship's captain, Commander Neil Funtanilla, was subsequently relieved of his command at an admiral's mast by Rear Admiral Phil Davidson, commander of Combined Task Force 50. On 17 August 2011, The Sullivans mistakenly fired on a fishing boat rather than a towed gunnery target during a gunnery exercise off North Carolina. As a result, Commander Mark Olson was relieved of his command. None of the inert shells hit the boat and there were no injuries as a result of the incident. On 7 May 2012, Commander Derick Armstrong was relieved of command after several female crew members alleged that he sexually harassed women aboard ship. On 18 August 2013, The Sullivans provided medical assistance to an ill mariner on board the merchant vessel MV Abir Alqaray No. 4, a Saudi Arabian-flagged dhow, off the coast of Saudi Arabia.

On 18 July 2015, a RIM-66 Standard missile test fired from The Sullivans exploded just after launch. No injuries were reported but a small fire occurred on deck. Malfunctions of solid-fuel missiles in the U.S. Navy are extremely rare. In early November 2017, The Sullivans pulled into port in New York City, and its crew was given shore leave to celebrate Veterans' Day in the city.

=== 2020s ===
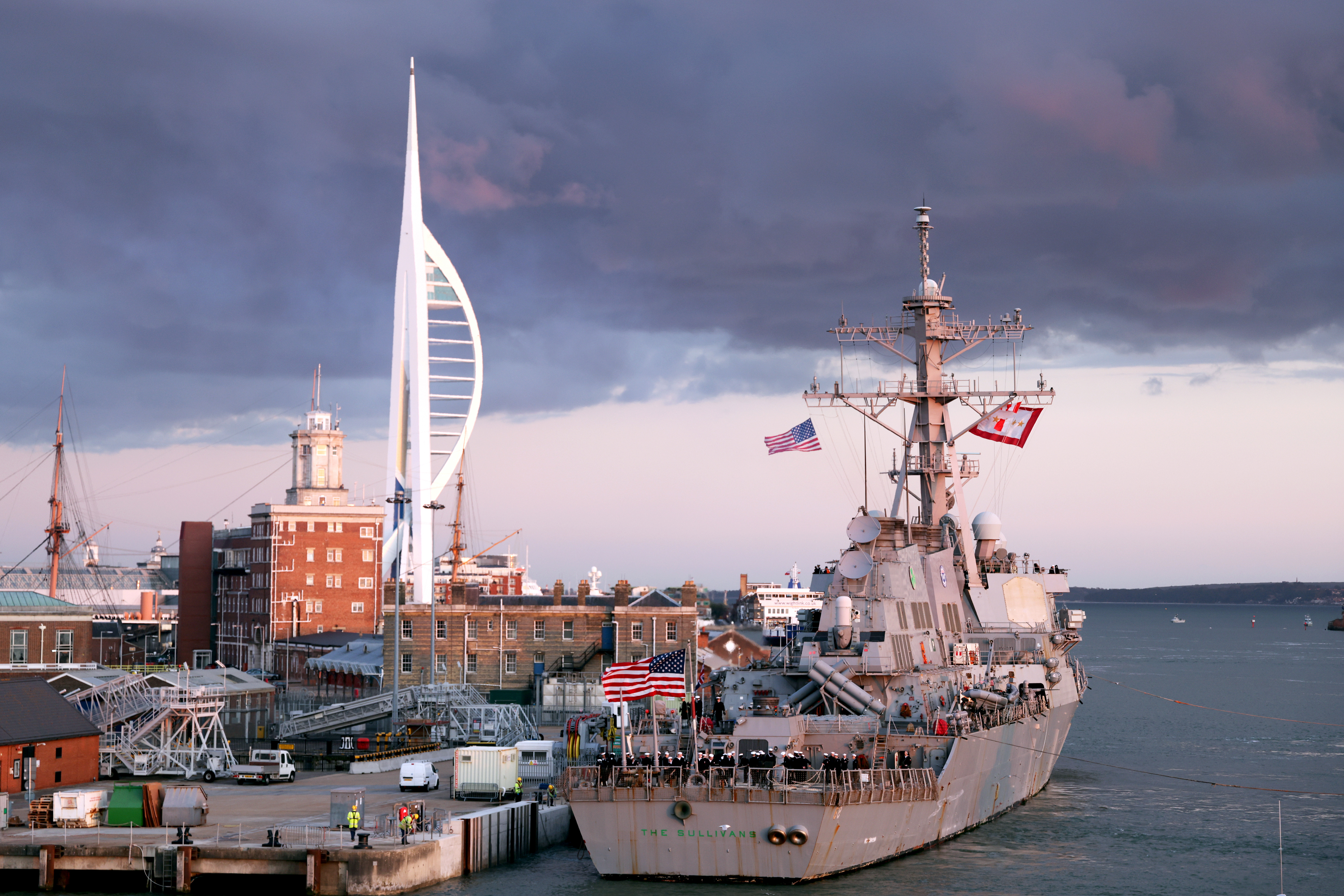
The Sullivans in Portsmouth, England, in preparation to join United Kingdom Carrier Strike Group 21

On 14 September 2020, it was announced that The Sullivans would be part of HMS Queen Elizabeth's Task Group for the GROUPEX and Joint Warrior exercises. On 19 January 2021, a declaration confirmed that The Sullivans would form part of the escort for HMS Queen Elizabeth during her first active deployment as part of the United Kingdom Carrier Strike Group 21 in 2021.

USS The Sullivans deployed on 2 November 2024 for her fifth deployment in the last 3 years.

== Awards ==
- Combat Action Ribbon – (April 2025)
- Meritorious Unit Commendation – (October 2022 – January 2023)
- Battenberg Cup – (2022)
- Marjorie Sterrett Battleship Fund Award – (2022)

== Coat of Arms ==
The dark blue and gold, on the shield of the coat of arms, represent the sea and excellence. They are also the US Navy's traditional colors. Red is emblematic of courage and sacrifice. The five interlaced swords honor the five Sullivan brothers killed in action during World War II and commemorate their spirit of teamwork and patriotism. The upright points of the swords allude to the present ship's combat readiness and her missile system. The border reflects unity and the eleven stars represent the battle stars earned by the first The Sullivans (DD-537); nine for World War II and two for the Korean War. The trident on the crest, a symbol of sea prowess, symbolizes DDG-68's modern warfare capabilities; the AEGIS and vertical launch system. The fireball underscores the Guadalcanal campaign where the five brothers were killed in action while serving on USS Juneau, and highlights the firepower of both past and present USS The Sullivans. The inverted wreath, a traditional symbol of the ultimate sacrifice, is also in memory of the Sullivan brothers. The shamrock recalls the Irish heritage. The arms, on the seal, are blazoned in full color upon a white oval enclosed by a dark blue collar edged on the outside with a gold rope and bearing the name USS The Sullivans at the top and "DDG 68" in the base in gold.
