= Borgstrom brothers =

American military siblings

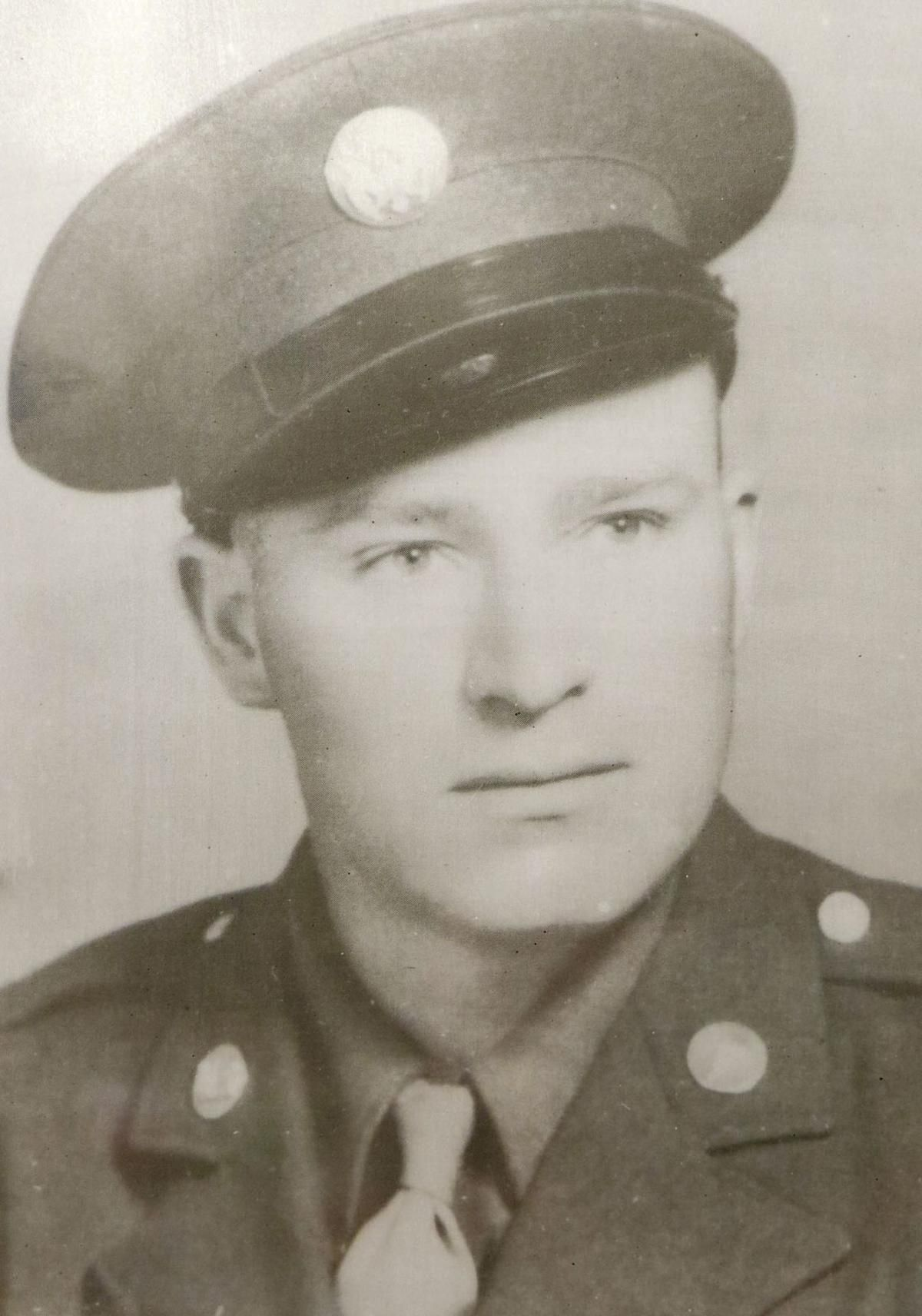
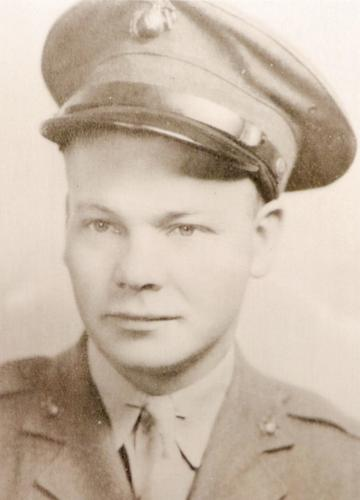
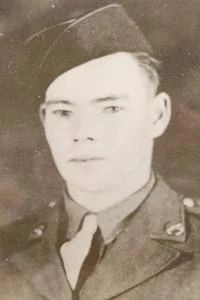
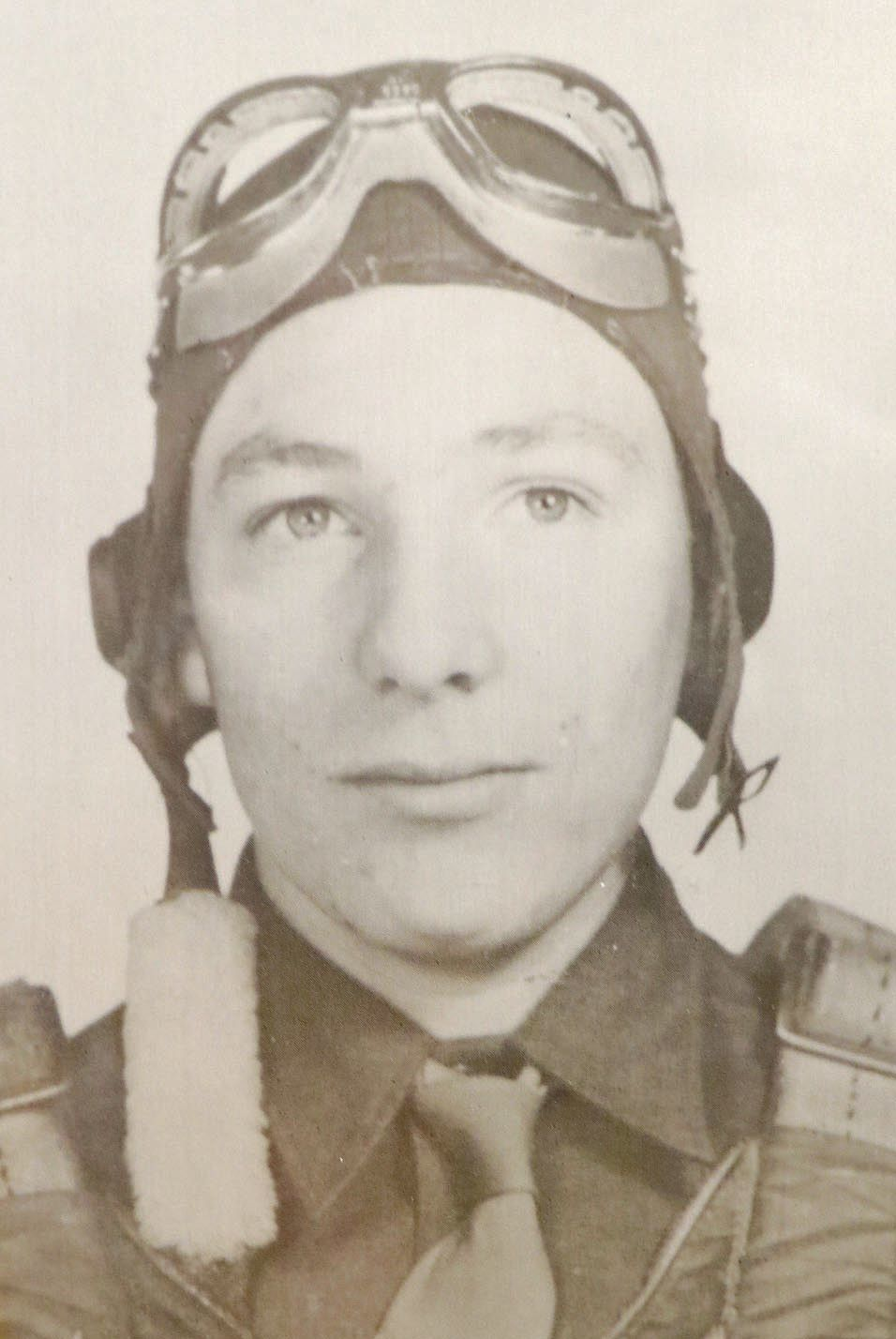
- From left to right: Leroy, Clyde, Rulon, and Rolon.
- Born: Thatcher, Utah, United States
- Known for: Helping lead to the adoption of the Sole Survivor Policy in National Military Establishment regulations in 1948
- LeRoy Elmer Borgstrom
- Born: April 30, 1914
- Died: June 22, 1944 (aged 30), Italy
- Cause of death: Serving in the US Army during World War II
- Clyde Eugene Borgstrom
- Born: February 15, 1916
- Died: March 17, 1944 (aged 28), Guadalcanal, Solomon Islands
- Cause of death: Serving in the US Marines in World War II
- Rulon Jay Borgstrom
- Born: May 5, 1925
- Died: August 25, 1944 (aged 19), Brest, France
- Cause of death: Serving with the US Army in World War II
- Rolon Day Borgstrom
- Born: May 5, 1925
- Died: August 8, 1944 (aged 19), Yaxham, England
- Cause of death: Serving in the US Army Air Forces during World War II, aircraft crash

The Borgstrom brothers were four American siblings, including twin brothers, killed over a six-month period during World War II.

== Brothers ==
The brothers were the sons of Alben and Gunda Borgstrom of Thatcher, Utah. The brothers were:

- LeRoy Elmer Borgstrom, 30 (born April 30, 1914, died June 22, 1944, in Italy), U.S. Army
- Clyde Eugene Borgstrom, 28 (born February 15, 1916, died March 17, 1944, in Guadalcanal, Solomon Islands), U.S. Marine Corps
- Rolon Day Borgstrom, 19 (born May 5, 1925, died August 8, 1944, in Yaxham, England), U.S. Army Air Forces
- Rulon Jay Borgstrom, 19 (born May 5, 1925, died August 25, 1944, in France), U.S. Army

== Early life ==
Alben and Gunda Borgstrom were the parents of ten children, seven of whom were boys. In 1921, their son Veran died from a ruptured appendix at the age of nine. The other six boys attended Bear River High School in Garland, Utah. After the U.S. entered the war, five of the remaining brothers enlisted or were drafted into the military: Boyd, LeRoy, Clyde, Rolon Day, and Rulon Jay Borgstrom.

== Military service ==
Clyde, serving in the 2nd Aviation Engineer Battalion, U.S. Marine Corps, on Guadalcanal in the Solomon Islands, was killed in an accident involving a falling tree while clearing land for an airstrip on March 17, 1944. Three months later, on June 22, 1944, LeRoy, serving with the 361st Infantry Regiment, 91st Infantry Division was killed in action in Italy. On August 8, 1944, Rolon Day, serving with the 506th Bombardment Squadron, 44th Bombardment Group, died when his bomber experienced engine problems and crashed near its base at Yaxham, England, while on a mission to France. His twin brother, Rulon Jay, serving with the 38th Infantry Regiment, 2nd Infantry Division, was initially reported missing in an attack on Le Dreff, near Brest, France, but was found and died 18 days later on August 25, 1944, from wounds received in action.

When Rulon Jay went missing in August 1944, the Borgstrom family, with help from neighbors and a Utah congressional delegation, successfully petitioned for Boyd, the last Borgstrom son in the military, to be released from service. Shortly thereafter, he was transferred home to the United States and discharged by special order of the Commandant of the Marine Corps Alexander Vandegrift. The Borgstrom's youngest son, Eldon, sometimes spelled Elton, who was not yet of enlistment age in 1944, was exempted from military service.

== Burial ==
Almost four years after the four brothers' deaths, their bodies were returned to Utah by the American Graves Registration Service. A funeral service for the four brothers was then held in the LDS Church's Garland Tabernacle in Garland, Utah on June 25, 1948. Clarence E. Smith, former principal of Bear River High School, Utah Governor Herbert B. Maw, LDS Church President George Albert Smith, and General Mark W. Clark spoke at the funeral. Rear Admiral John R. Redman, Major General LeRoy P. Hunt, and Brigadier General Ned Schramm were in attendance. The brothers were then buried side by side in the Riverview Cemetery in Tremonton, Utah.

During the funeral service, the brothers were posthumously awarded three Bronze Star Medals, one Air Medal, and one Good Conduct Medal. According to Colonel Leonard R. Crews, "commanding officer of the Sixth Army escort detachment at Ogden," the Borgstrom family was the "only four-star Gold Star family on record in World War II" (the Sullivan brothers—all of whom were killed in the same incident in World War II—were a five-star Gold Star family).

== Legacy ==
The Salt Lake Tribune reported in November 1944 that the deaths of the four Borgstrom brothers resulted in "the armed services rul[ing] special consideration will be given any family in which two or more sons have been killed and only one member in service survives." Even though the article was published a few years before the Sole Survivor Policy was enacted (1948), the deaths of the Borgstrom brothers, along with the deaths of the Sullivan brothers and others, may have contributed to the development of this policy. The loss of four of the Borgstrom brothers, along with the loss of all five Sullivan brothers, led to the official adoption of the Sole Survivor Policy in National Military Establishment regulations in 1948.

In April 1959, the Army honored the Borgstrom brothers by naming a reserve training center in Ogden, Utah in their honor. In August 2001, a soldiers' memorial was dedicated in Tremonton, Utah, which had the images and names of the brothers in a place of prominence.

== See also ==
- Bixby letter
- Niland brothers
- Sullivan brothers
- Rogers brothers
- Sole Survivor Policy
- Saving Private Ryan

General

- List of solved missing person cases (pre-1950)
