= Bixby letter =

Letter written by Abraham Lincoln

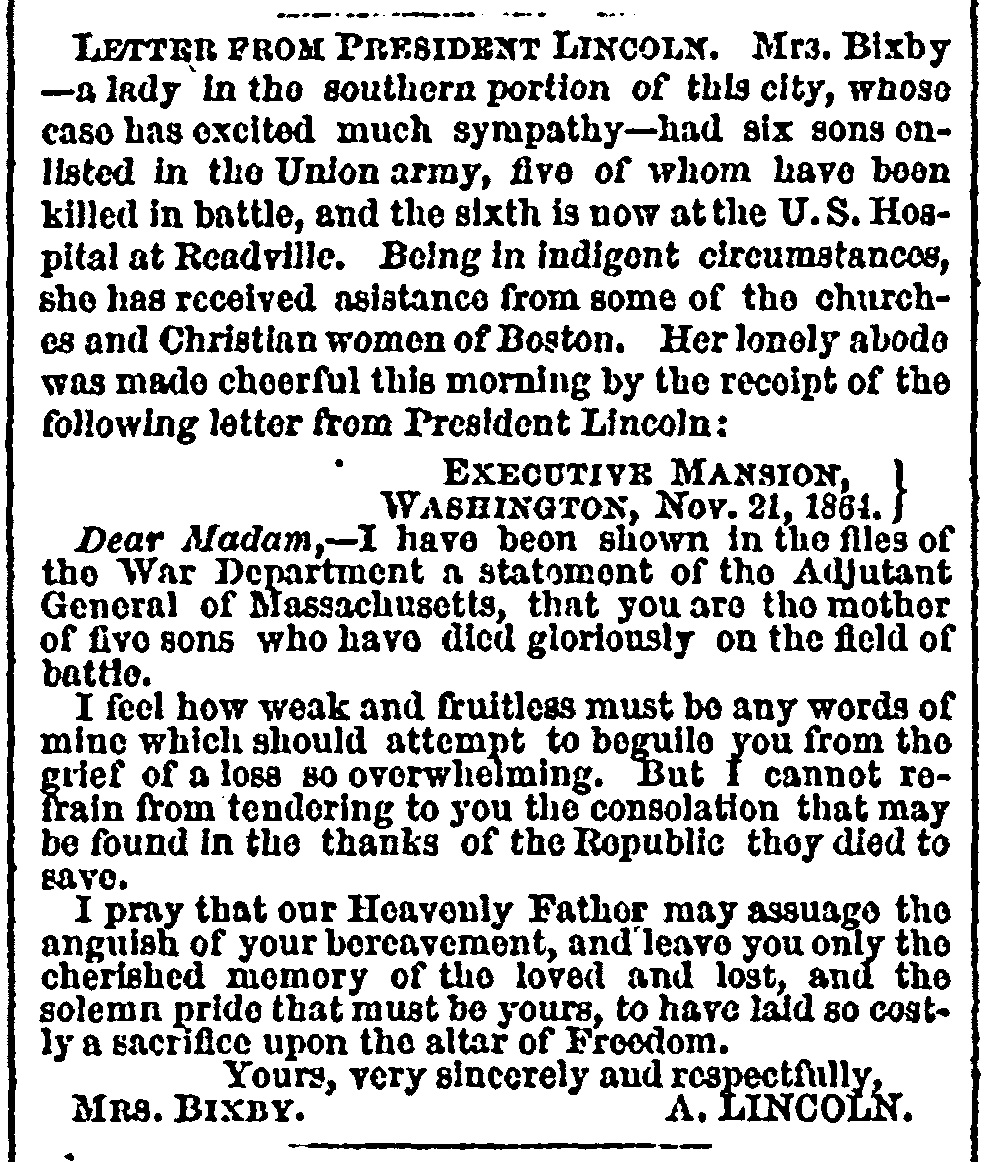
The Bixby letter in the Boston Evening Transcript

The Bixby letter is a brief, consoling message sent by President Abraham Lincoln in November 1864 to Lydia Parker Bixby, a widow living in Boston, Massachusetts, who was thought to have lost five sons in the Union army during the American Civil War. Along with the Gettysburg Address and his second inaugural address, the letter has been praised as one of Lincoln's finest written works and is often reproduced in memorials, media, and print.

Controversy surrounds the recipient, the fate of her sons, and the authorship of the letter. Bixby's character has been questioned (including rumored Confederate sympathies), at least two of her sons survived the war, and the letter was possibly written by Lincoln's assistant private secretary, John Hay.

== Text ==
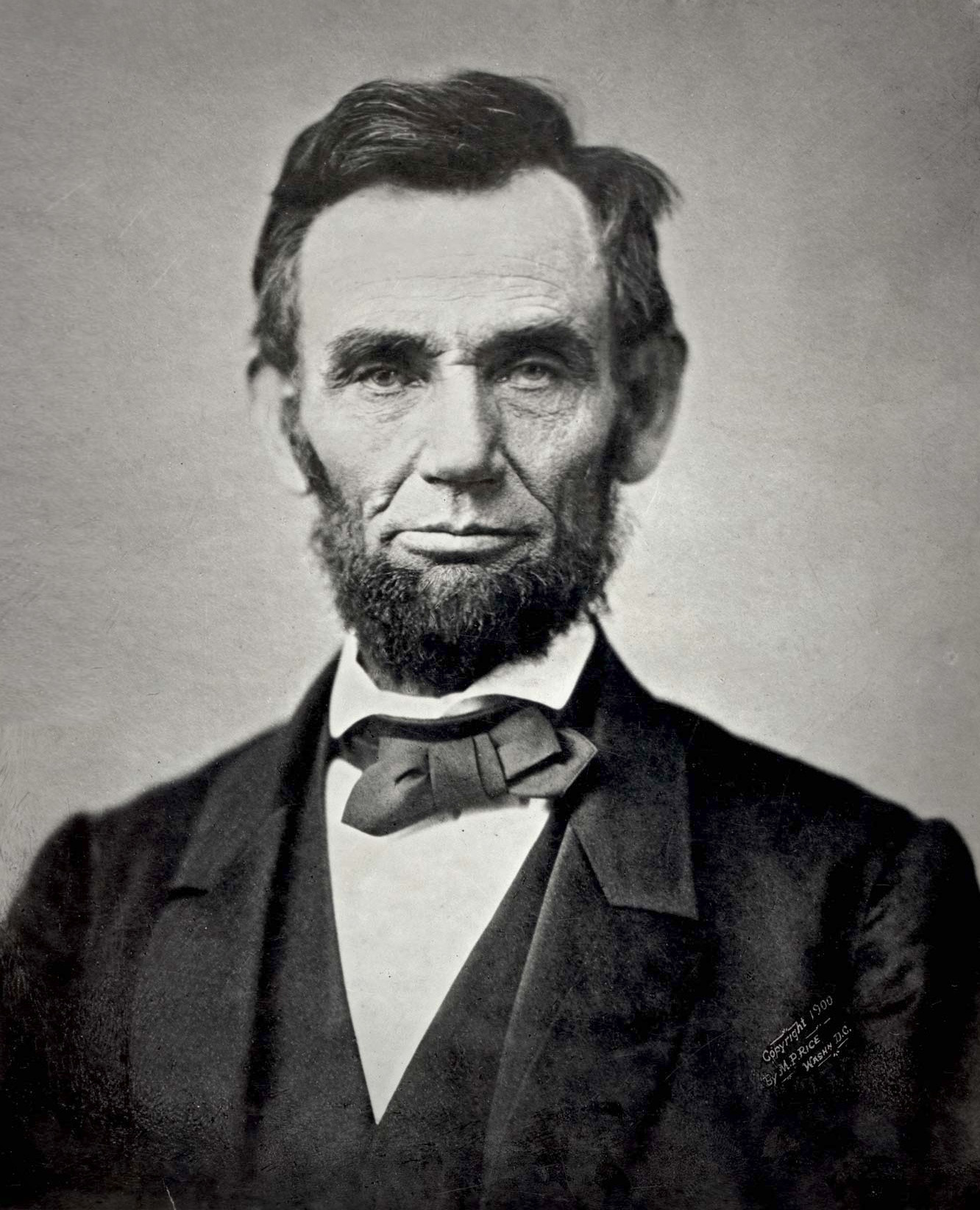
Abraham Lincoln, the 16th President of the United States

President Lincoln's letter of condolence was delivered to Lydia Bixby on November 25, 1864, and was printed in the Boston Evening Transcript and Boston Evening Traveller that afternoon. The following is the text of the letter as first published in the Transcript: (Note: The Transcript wrote the letter's date as "Nov. 21, 1864" while the Traveller wrote it as "21st November, 1864". The text in the Traveller also does not have the commas after "Massachusetts" and "yours".)

Executive Mansion,
Washington, Nov. 21, 1864.

Dear Madam,

I have been shown in the files of the War Department a statement of the Adjutant General of Massachusetts, that you are the mother of five sons who have died gloriously on the field of battle.

I feel how weak and fruitless must be any words of mine which should attempt to beguile you from the grief of a loss so overwhelming. But I cannot refrain from tendering to you the consolation that may be found in the thanks of the Republic they died to save.

I pray that our Heavenly Father may assuage the anguish of your bereavement, and leave you only the cherished memory of the loved and lost, and the solemn pride that must be yours, to have laid so costly a sacrifice upon the altar of Freedom.

Yours, very sincerely and respectfully,
A. LINCOLN.

Mrs. Bixby.

== History ==
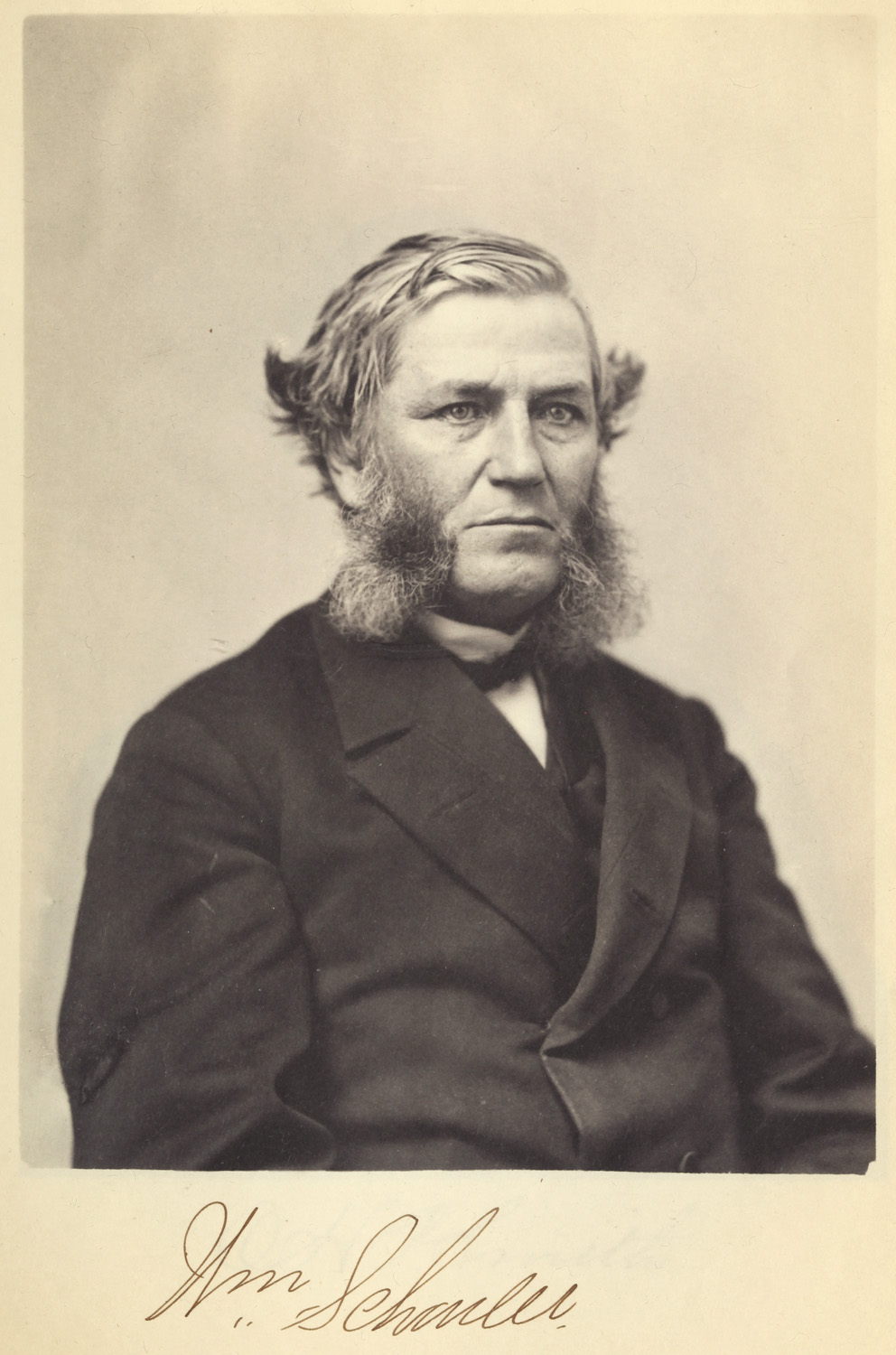
William Schouler, Massachusetts Adjutant General

Lydia Parker married shoemaker Cromwell Bixby on September 26, 1826, in Hopkinton, Massachusetts. The couple had at least six sons and three daughters before Cromwell's death in 1854. Some time before the Civil War, Bixby and her family settled in Boston.

=== Meeting with Adjutant General Schouler ===
On September 24, 1864, Massachusetts Adjutant General William Schouler wrote to Massachusetts Governor John Albion Andrew about a discharge request sent to the governor by Otis Newhall, the father of five Union soldiers. In the letter, Schouler recalled how, two years prior, they had helped a poor widow named Lydia Bixby to visit a son who was a patient at a Union army hospital. About ten days earlier, Bixby had come to Schouler's office claiming that five of her sons had died fighting for the Union. Governor Andrew forwarded Newhall's request to the U.S. War Department with a note requesting that the president honor Bixby with a letter.

In response to a War Department request of October 1, Schouler sent a messenger to Bixby's home six days later, asking for the names and units of her sons. He sent a report to the War Department on October 12, which was delivered to President Lincoln by Secretary of War Edwin Stanton sometime after October 28.

On November 21, both the Boston Evening Traveller and the Boston Evening Transcript published an appeal by Schouler for contributions to assist soldiers' families at Thanksgiving which mentioned a widow who had lost five sons in the war. Schouler had some of the donations given to Bixby and then visited her home on Thanksgiving, November 24. The letter from the President arrived at Schouler's office the next morning.

=== Military record of the Bixby sons ===
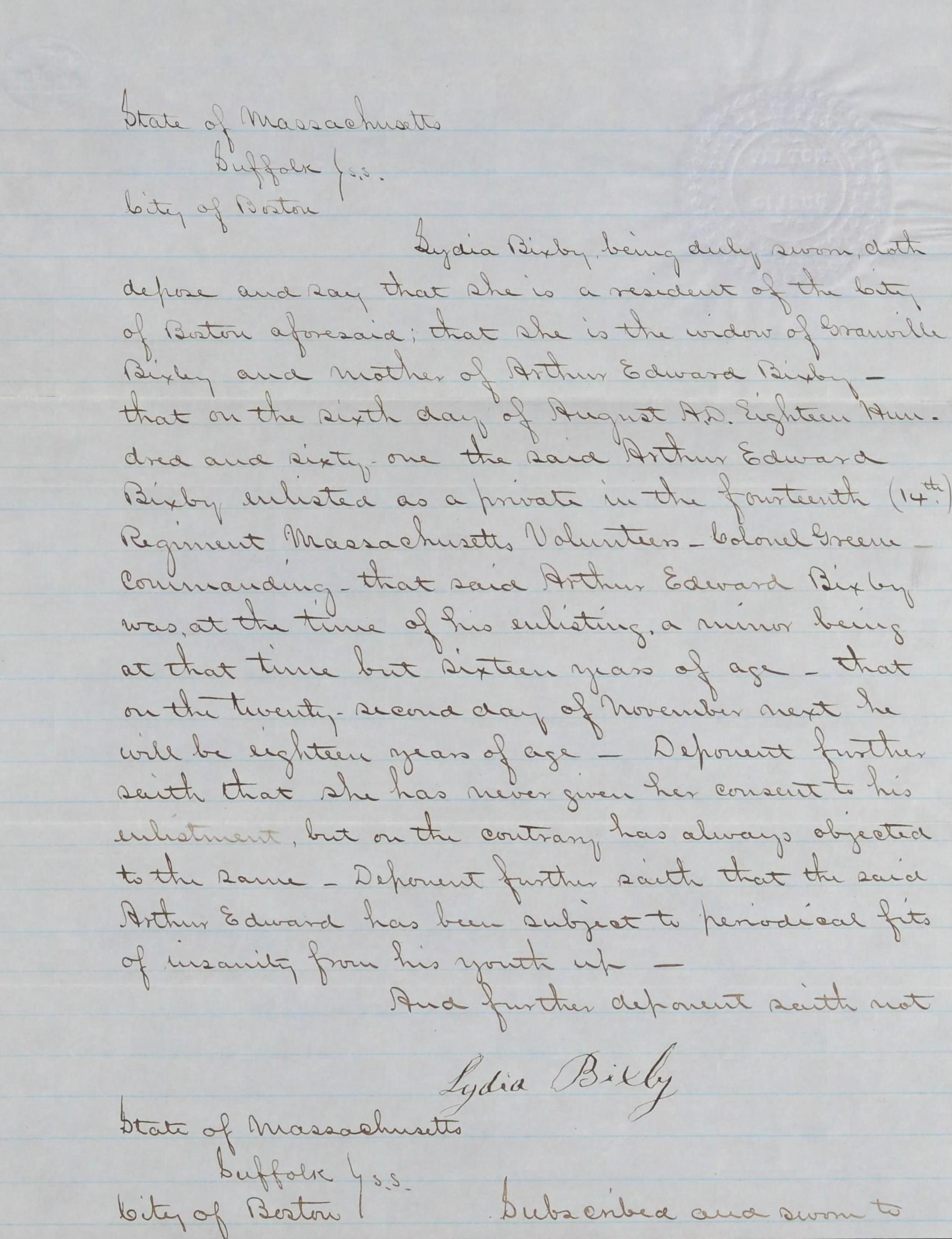
Bixby's 1862 affidavit attempting to secure a discharge for son Edward

At least two of Lydia Bixby's sons survived the war:

- Private Arthur Edward Bixby (known as "Edward") – Company C, 1st Massachusetts Heavy Artillery (enlisted June 24, 1861). Deserted from Ft. Richardson, Virginia on May 28, 1862. Trying to secure a discharge for him, his mother filed an affidavit on October 17, 1862, which claimed Edward had enlisted underage without her permission. Born July 13, 1843, in Hopkinton, Massachusetts. Returned to Boston after the war.
- Sergeant Charles N. Bixby – Company D, 20th Massachusetts Infantry (served July 18, 1861 – May 3, 1863). Killed in action near Fredericksburg. Born c.1841 in Hopkinton, Massachusetts.
- Corporal Henry Cromwell Bixby – 1st enlistment, Company G, 20th Massachusetts Infantry (served July 18, 1861 – May 29, 1862). 2nd enlistment, Company K, 32nd Massachusetts Infantry (served August 5, 1862 – December 17, 1864). Captured at Gettysburg and sent to Richmond, Virginia. Paroled on March 7, 1864, at City Point, Virginia. Born March 30, 1830, in Hopkinton, Massachusetts. Died November 8, 1871, in Milford, Massachusetts, from tuberculosis he contracted while a soldier.
- Private Oliver Cromwell Bixby, Jr. – Company E, 58th Massachusetts Infantry (served February 26, 1864 – July 30, 1864). Wounded at Spotsylvania on May 12, 1864. Killed in action near Petersburg, Virginia. Born February 1, 1828, in Hopkinton, Massachusetts.
- Private George Way Bixby – Company B, 56th Massachusetts Infantry (served March 16, 1864 – ?). Enlisted under the name "George Way", apparently to conceal his enlistment from his wife. Captured at Petersburg on July 30, 1864. First held prisoner at Richmond but later transferred to Salisbury Prison in North Carolina, arriving there on October 9, 1864. His fate after that remains uncertain. Military records report conflicting accounts of him either dying at Salisbury or deserting to the Confederate States Army. (Note: A "George Bixby, nephew of Cuba" is also mentioned in an 1878 estate record of Albert Bixby, an uncle who died in Milford, Massachusetts. However, this George was not included on the estate's list of surviving heirs of Cromwell Bixby. Milford relatives later admitted confusing Lydia Bixby's sons with cousins having the same name.) Born June 22, 1836, in Hopkinton, Massachusetts.

Schouler's report to the War Department erroneously listed Edward as a member of the 22nd Massachusetts Infantry who had died of his wounds at Folly Island, South Carolina. Bixby may have been trying to conceal—possibly from embarrassment or hope of further financial aid—Edward's 1862 desertion. (She had been receiving a pension following Charles's death in 1863.)

At the time of her September meeting with Schouler, Bixby's son George had been a prisoner of war for just over a month, and Henry was still hospitalized following his exchange. The War Department failed to use its own records to correct errors in the Schouler report.

=== Questions of character ===
Lydia Bixby died in Boston on October 27, 1878, while a patient at Massachusetts General Hospital. In his initial letter to Governor Andrew, Schouler called Bixby "the best specimen of a true-hearted Union woman I have yet seen," but in the years following her death both her character and loyalty were questioned.

Writing to her daughter in 1904, Boston socialite Sarah Cabot Wheelwright claimed she had met and had given charitable aid to Lydia Bixby during the war, hoping that one of her sons, in Boston on leave, might help deliver packages to Union prisoners of war; but she later heard gossip that Bixby "kept a house of ill-fame, was perfectly untrustworthy and as bad as she could be".

In the 1920s, Lincoln scholar William E. Barton interviewed the oldest residents of Hopkinton, Massachusetts for their memories of Bixby's family before she moved to Boston. They recalled her sons as being "tough" with "some of them too fond of drink". One son may have "served a jail sentence for some misdemeanor".

On August 12, 1925, Elizabeth Towers, a daughter of Oliver Bixby, told the Boston Herald that her grandmother had "great sympathy for the South" and that her mother recalled that Bixby had been "highly indignant" about the letter with "little good to say of President Lincoln". In 1949, Towers' nephew, Arthur March Bixby, claimed that Lydia Bixby had moved to Massachusetts from Richmond, Virginia; though this assertion is contradicted by contemporary records which list her birthplace as Rhode Island. (Note: Lydia Bixby's own 1878 death record listed her birthplace as Hopkinton, Massachusetts, but census records and death records of surviving children listed her birthplace as Rhode Island.)

== Copies ==
=== Original copy ===
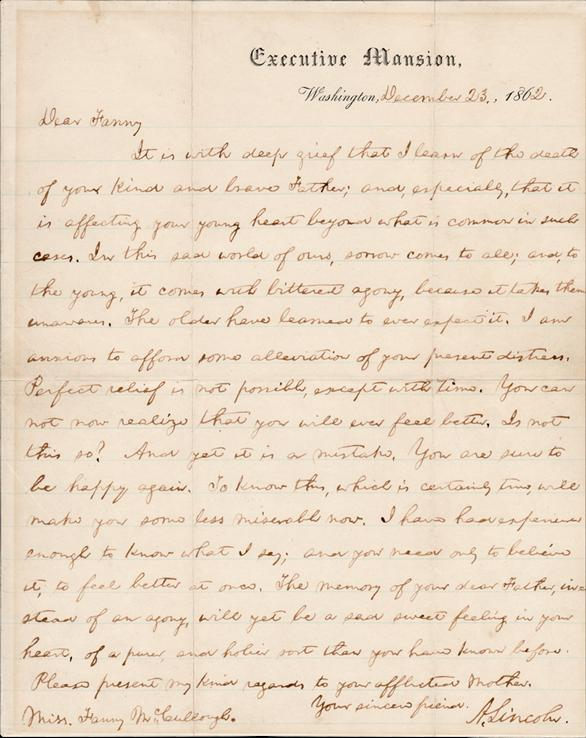
A similar letter Lincoln sent to Fanny McCullough in 1862

The fate of the original letter given to Bixby is unknown. William A. Bixby, a son of Oliver, told The New York Times in an August 9, 1925, interview that he did not know what happened to the letter after his grandmother received it, though he doubted it still survived. A few days later, William's sister, Elizabeth told the Boston Herald that she also did not know the letter's fate but speculated Bixby may have torn it up, resenting that it incorrectly said five of her sons had been killed. William's son, Arthur March Bixby, told the New York Sun in 1949 that he recalled his father telling him that she had angrily destroyed the letter after receiving it.

In the early 20th century, it was sometimes claimed that the original letter could be found on display at Brasenose College at the University of Oxford along with other great works in the English language. Lincoln scholar F. Lauriston Bullard investigated this claim in 1925, discovering that it was untrue and the college had never heard of the Bixby letter.

=== Tobin facsimile ===
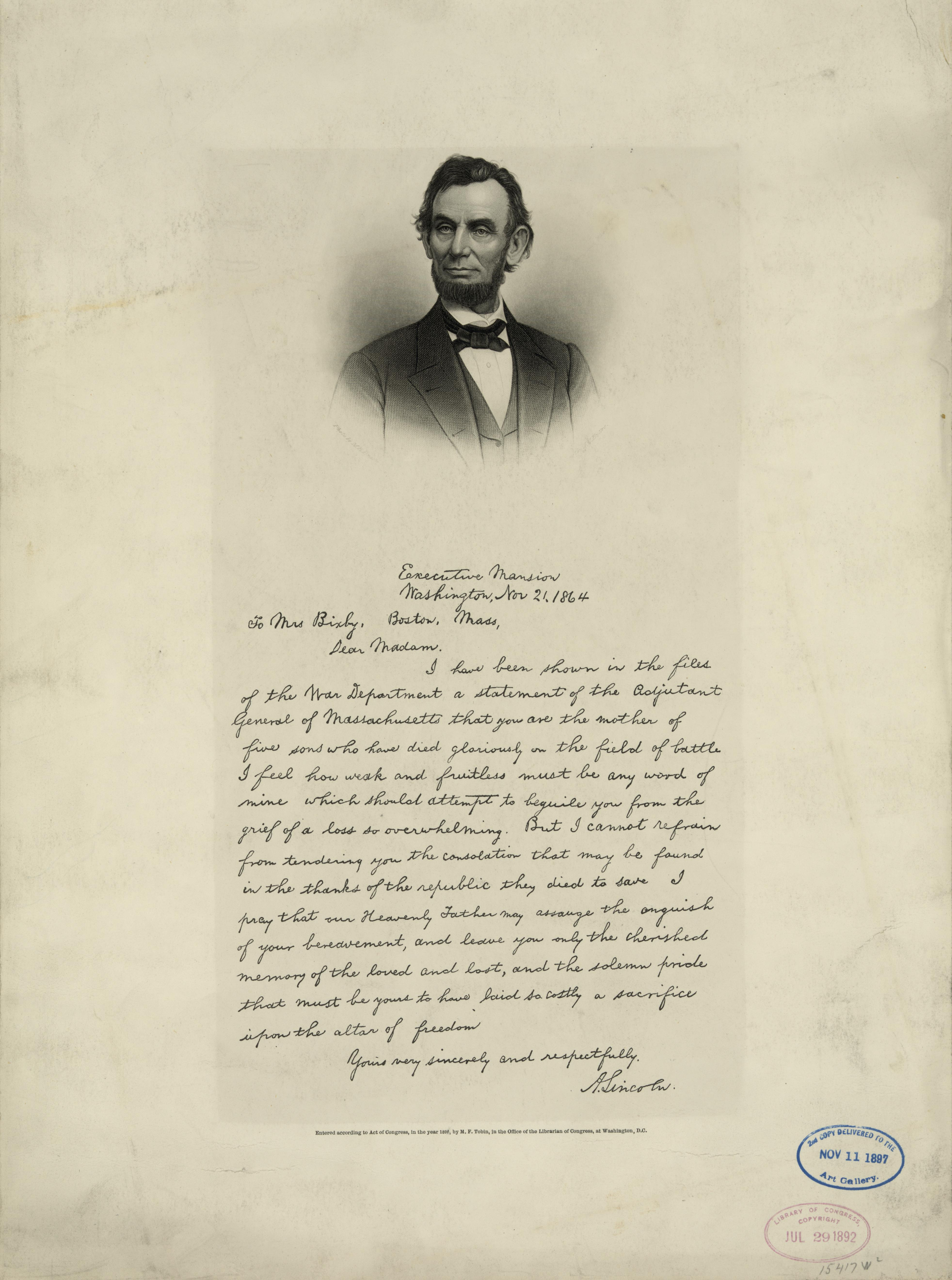
Michael F. Tobin's 1891 lithographic facsimile of the letter

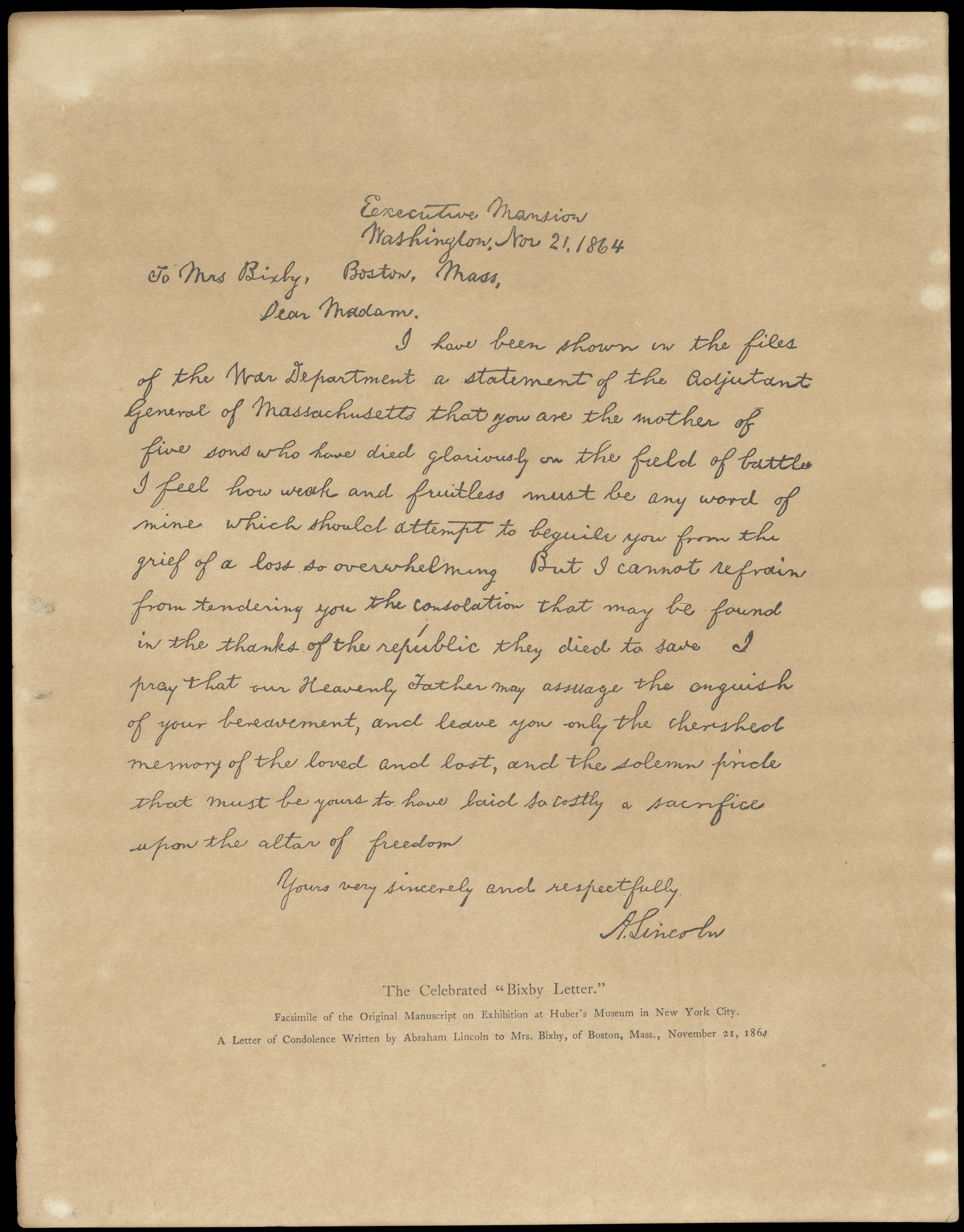
Huber's Museum sold these copies of Tobin's facsimile.

Christie's auction house receives many supposed original Bixby letters every year, including copies of a lithographic facsimile of the letter in widespread circulation. These first appeared in 1891, when New York City print dealer Michael F. Tobin applied for a copyright to sell souvenir copies of the letter with an engraving of Lincoln by John Chester Buttre for $2 each. Soon, Huber's Museum, a dime museum in Manhattan, began displaying a copy, "stained by coffee and exposure", of Tobin's facsimile as "the original Bixby letter" and selling their own copies for $1 each.

Charles Hamilton, an autograph dealer and handwriting expert, examined the Tobin facsimile; concluding it had been copied from a poorly executed forgery originally written in pencil and retraced in ink to imitate Lincoln's handwriting, calling it "halting and awkward and makes his forceful hand appear like a child's scrawl".

Tobin's facsimile also errs when compared to the original text of the letter published in Boston newspapers; adding the salutation "To Mrs Bixby, Boston Mass", misspelling the word "assuage" as "assauge", omitting the word "to" after the word "tendering", changing the plural "words" into "word", not capitalizing the words "freedom" and "republic", missing the recipient "Mrs. Bixby" on the bottom left, and combining the original three paragraphs into one. Huber's Museum corrected the spelling of "assuage" in their version of the facsimile.

== Authorship ==
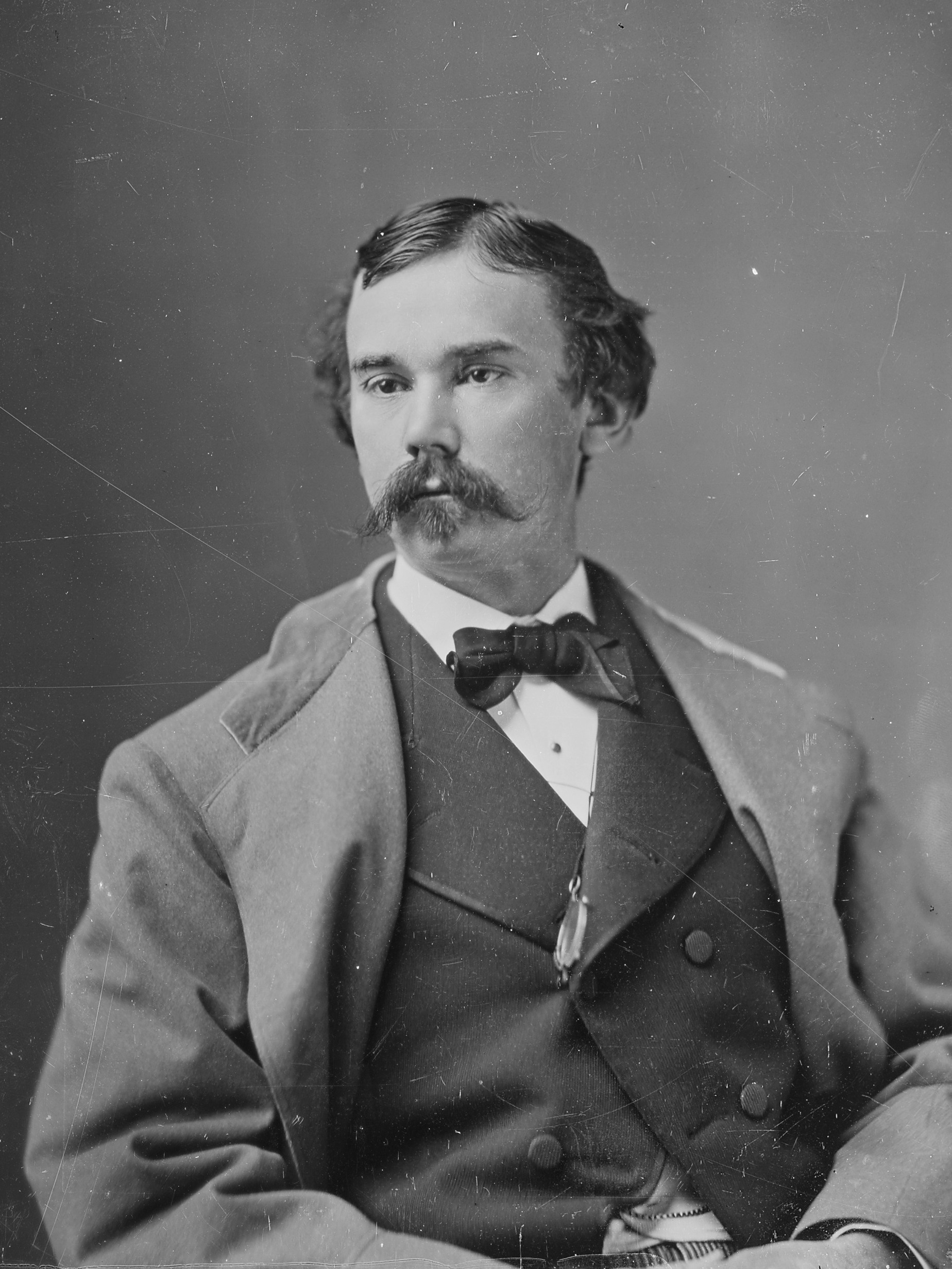
John Hay, Lincoln's private secretary

Scholars have debated whether the Bixby letter was written by Lincoln himself or by his assistant private secretary, John Hay. November 1864 was a busy month for Lincoln, possibly forcing him to delegate the task to Hay.

Second- and third-hand recollections of acquaintances suggest Hay may have claimed to others that he wrote it, but his children could not recall him ever mentioning composing the letter. Writing to William E. Chandler in 1904, Hay said "the letter of Mr. Lincoln to Mrs. Bixby is genuine", but he may only have been referring to its text. In a 1917 letter to historian Isaac Markens, Robert Todd Lincoln said Hay had told him that he did not have "any special knowledge of the letter at the time" it was written.

Historian Michael Burlingame, who believes Hay is the author, has pointed out that Hay's scrapbooks have two newspaper clippings of the letter while largely containing Hay's own writing. However, they also contain material written by Lincoln, including the Gettysburg Address and the Second Inaugural.

Scholars favoring Lincoln's authorship, including Edward Steers and Jason Emerson, note that the Gettysburg Address and the Farewell Address are similar examples of Lincoln's highly regarded style. Other scholars, such as Burlingame, have countered that Hay wrote pieces that compare favorably to the Bixby letter and note words and phrases in the letter that appear more frequently in Hay's writings than those of Lincoln. For instance, Burlingame notes the word beguile appears numerous times in the works of Hay and the phrase I cannot refrain from tendering is used by Hay in an 1864 letter to Quincy Gillmore, but neither appears once in the other collected works of Lincoln. However, the phrase I cannot refrain from is used by Lincoln in an 1859 letter to Salmon P. Chase.

In 1988, at the request of investigator Joe Nickell, University of Kentucky professor of English Jean G. Pival studied the vocabulary, syntax, and other stylistic characteristics of the letter and concluded that it more closely resembled Lincoln's style of writing than Hay's.

A computer analysis method, developed to address the difficulty in attribution of shorter texts, used in a 2018 study by researchers at Aston University's Centre for Forensic Linguistics identified Hay as the letter's author.

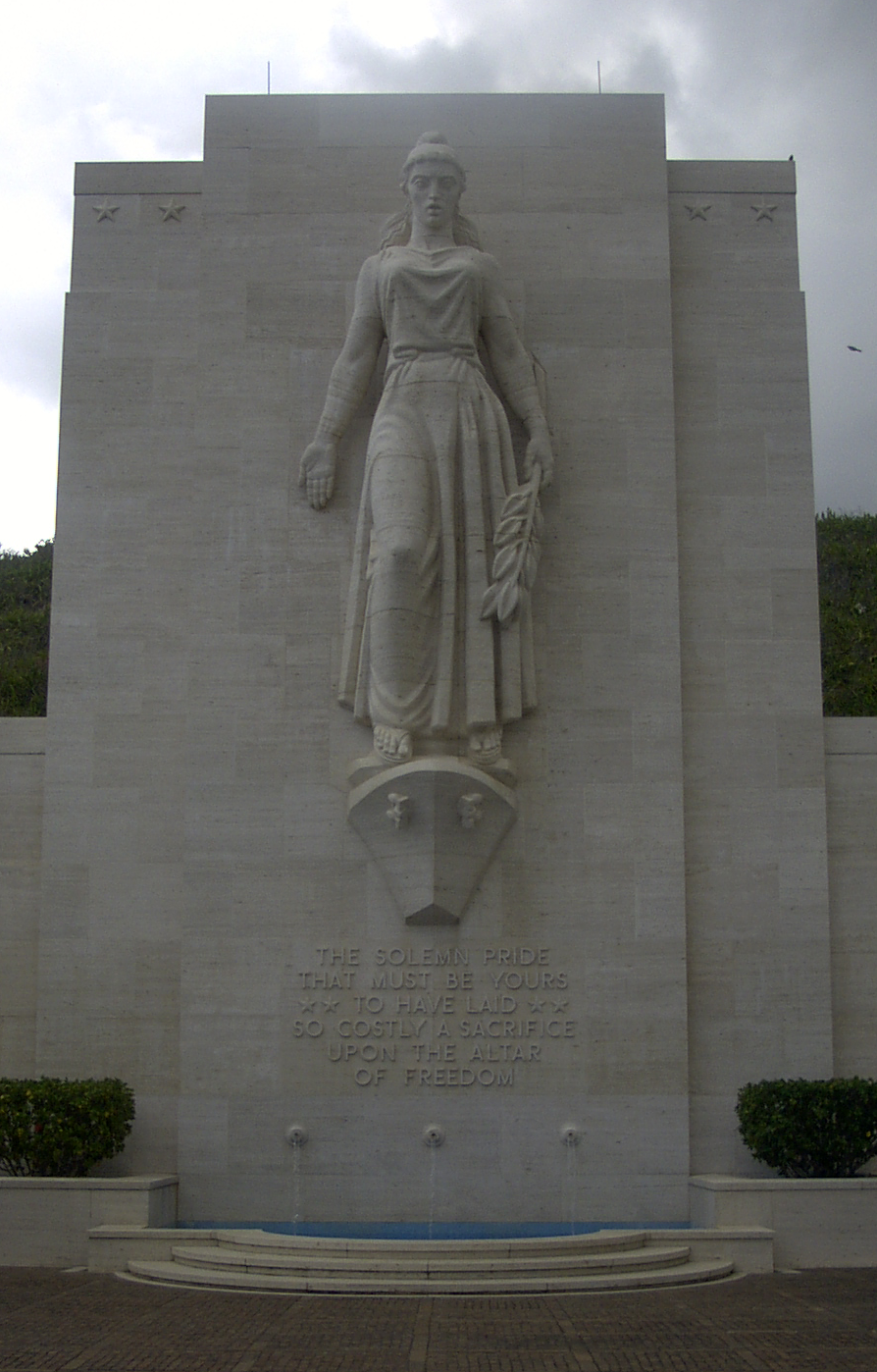
Inscription quoting the Bixby letter at the National Memorial Cemetery of the Pacific

== Legacy ==
The letter's passage "the solemn pride that must be yours to have laid so costly a sacrifice upon the altar of freedom" is inscribed on the base of the statue of Lady Columbia at the National Memorial Cemetery of the Pacific in Hawaii.

Discussions on the topic of siblings dying in war have frequently mentioned the letter; such as the Sullivan brothers, the Niland brothers, the Borgstrom brothers, and the Sole Survivor Policy of the United States military.

In the 1998 war film Saving Private Ryan, General George Marshall (played by Harve Presnell) reads the Bixby letter to his officers before giving the order to find and send home Private James Francis Ryan after Ryan's three brothers died in battle, setting in motion the eponymous story of the film. In a voiceover near the end of the film, Marshall quotes the Bixby letter in a letter to Mrs. Ryan.

On September 11, 2011, former U.S. President George W. Bush read the Bixby letter during the memorial ceremony at the World Trade Center site on the tenth anniversary of the September 11 attacks.

== See also ==
- Letter to Fanny McCullough
