= Neuville-au-Plain =

- Commune
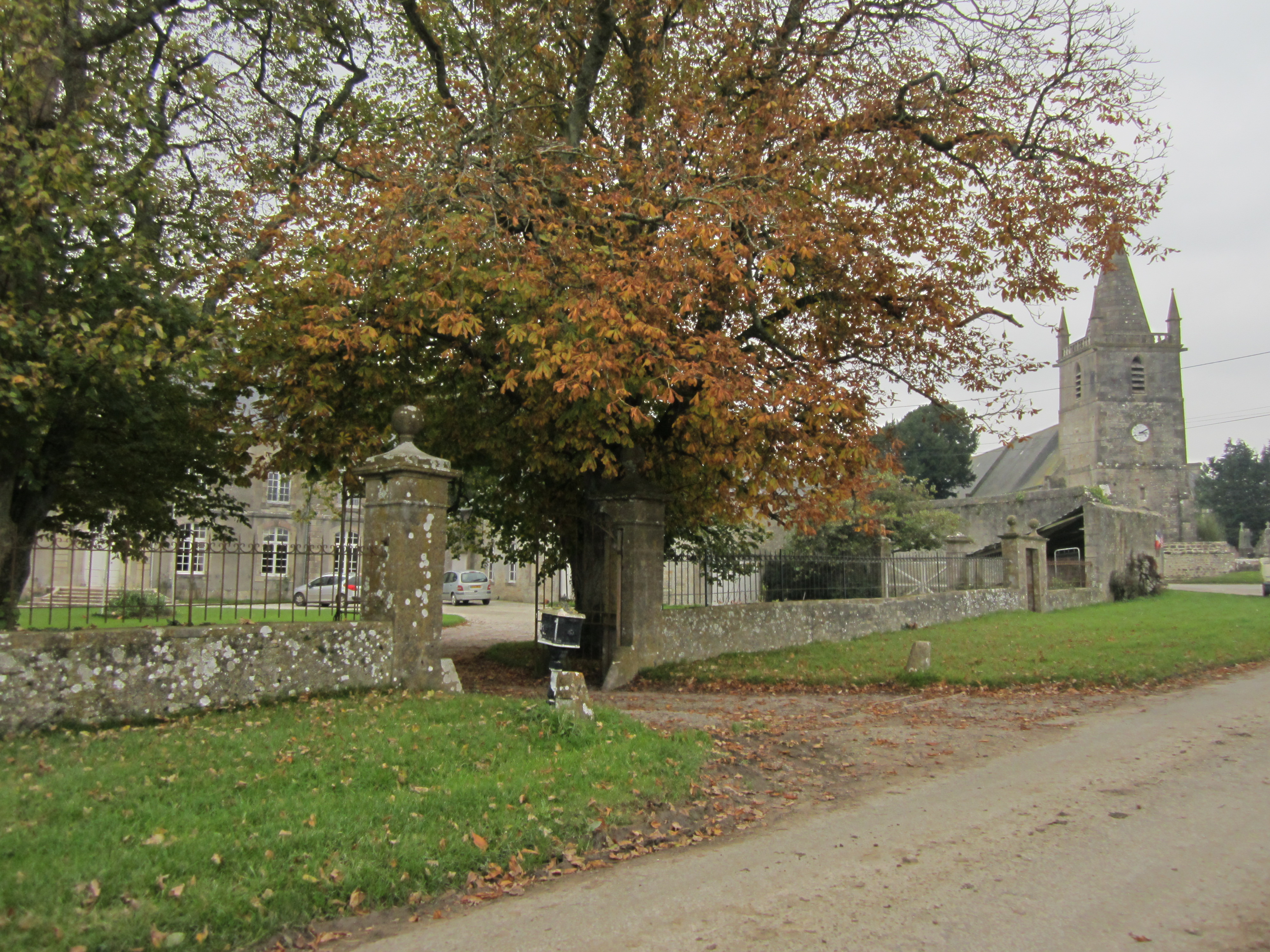
- The village with the church and the castle
- Location of Neuville-au-Plain
- Location within France Location within Normandy
- Coordinates: 49°25′42″N 1°19′43″W
- Country: France
- Region: Normandy
- Department: Manche
- Arrondissement: Cherbourg
- Canton: Carentan-les-Marais
- Intercommunality: La Baie du Cotentin

Government
  - Mayor (2020–2026): Florence Bérot
- Area^{1}: 4.70 km^{2} (1.81 sq mi)
- Elevation: 10 m (33 ft)
- Highest elevation: 36 m (118 ft)
- Lowest elevation: 2 m (6.6 ft)
- Population (2023): 81
  - Density: 17/km^{2} (45/sq mi)
- Time zone: UTC+01:00 (CET)
  - Summer (DST): UTC+02:00 (CEST)
- INSEE/Postal code: 50373 /50480
- ^{1} French Land Register data, which excludes lakes, ponds, glaciers > 1 km^{2} (0.386 sq mi or 247 acres) and river estuaries.

Neuville-au-Plain (French pronunciation: [nøvil o plɛ̃]) is a commune in the Manche department in Normandy in north-western France.

== History ==
=== World War II ===
On 6 June 1944 Neuville-au-Plain was one objective of the 505th Infantry Regiment, 82nd Airborne Division of the United States Army in the invasion of Normandy. After capturing the commune early in the day, just 42 men of Company D/505 PIR, led by 1Lt Turner Brashears Turnbull III (who was killed the next day by an artillery shell), were left to defend it. A much larger German force, consisting mainly of the 1058th Grenadier Regiment of the 91st Infantry Division, counterattacked and half of the defenders were killed or wounded in a heavy 8 hour battle. Eventually two of the American defenders, Sergeant Robert Niland and Corporal James Kelly, volunteered to remain behind. They were among wounded members of the 3rd platoon who held the German force off long enough for the rest to escape. Sergeant Niland was killed during this action.

== See also ==
- Communes of the Manche department
