= Sullivan brothers =

Irish-American brothers killed in World War II

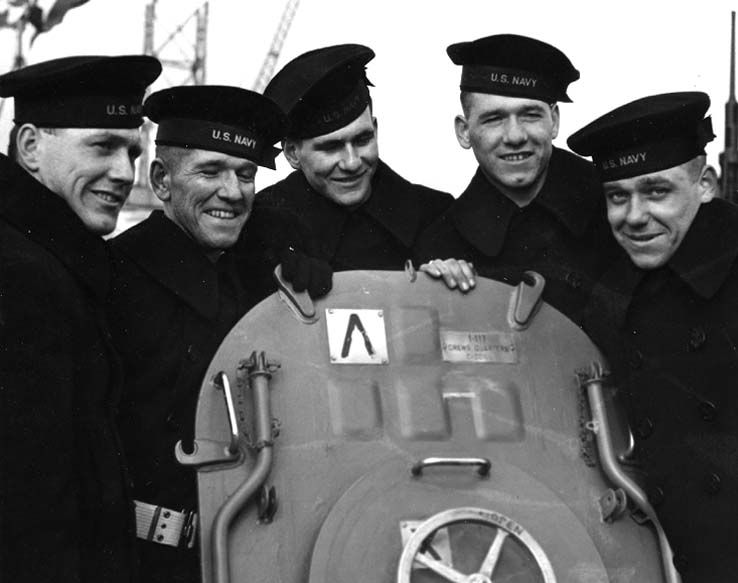
The Sullivan brothers on board the cruiser USS Juneau at her commissioning: Joe, Frank, Al, Matt, and George (14 February 1942)

The Sullivan brothers were five brothers from Waterloo, Iowa who served together on the light cruiser USS Juneau. They were all killed in action on November 13, 1942, when Juneau served in the Naval Battle of Guadalcanal. Juneau was crippled by a torpedo fired from the Japanese destroyer Amatsukaze, then finished off by a torpedo fired from Japanese submarine I-26.

== Background ==
The Sullivan brothers were from a working-class Irish-American family in Waterloo, Iowa. They descended from Mary Bridget and Tom O'Sullivan, a young couple who left the Beara Peninsula in County Cork, Ireland during the Great Famine in 1849. Mary and Tom were the grandparents of Thomas F. Sullivan (1883–1965), who worked as a freight conductor for the Illinois Central Railroad and married Alleta Abel (1895–1972) in 1914. Thomas and Alleta were parishioners at St. Mary's Catholic Church in Waterloo. They had seven children, five sons and two daughters, one of whom died during infancy. The five brothers were:

- George Thomas Sullivan, 27 (born December 14, 1914), Gunner's Mate Second Class (George had been previously discharged in May 1941 as Gunner's Mate Third Class.)
- Francis Henry "Frank" Sullivan, 26 (born February 18, 1916), Coxswain (Frank had been previously discharged in May 1941 as Seaman First Class.)
- Joseph Eugene "Joe" Sullivan, 24 (born August 28, 1918), Seaman Second Class
- Madison Abel "Matt" Sullivan, 23 (born November 8, 1919), Seaman Second Class
- Albert Leo "Al" Sullivan, 20 (born July 8, 1922), Seaman Second Class

The brothers were survived by their parents, and a sister, Genevieve (1917–1975), who served in the WAVES. She was the girlfriend of Bill Ball, whose death while serving on the USS Arizona during the attack on Pearl Harbor had prompted her brothers to join the Navy to avenge him. Al was survived by his wife Katherine Mary and son Jimmy. Joe left a fiancée named Margaret Jaros, while Matt left behind a fiancée, Beatrice Imperato. Al Sullivan's son served on board the first USS The Sullivans. His grandmother christened the first ship. The second USS The Sullivans was christened by Al's granddaughter Kelly Ann Sullivan Loughren.

== Military service ==
The Sullivans enlisted in the US Navy on January 3, 1942, with the stipulation that they serve together. In mid-1942, the Navy promulgated a policy of separating siblings, but this was not strictly enforced. George and Frank had served in the Navy before, but their brothers had not. All five were assigned to the light cruiser USS Juneau.

The Sullivans were not the only brother sailors on the ship. At least thirty sets of brothers served on the Juneau, including the two Rogers brothers from Bridgeport, Connecticut. Before the ill-fated Savo Island operation, two of the Rogers brothers were transferred to other commands. According to those who survived, had the ship returned to port safely, at least two Sullivans would have also transferred.

Juneau participated in a number of naval engagements during the months-long Guadalcanal campaign beginning in August 1942. Early in the morning of November 13, 1942, during the Naval Battle of Guadalcanal, Juneau exchanged fire with the destroyer Yūdachi but failed to make any hits. However, the cruiser became the focus of the destroyer Amatsukaze (which had just sunk the destroyer USS Barton) which proceeded to fire a spread of four torpedoes. One of these torpedoes hit Juneau, cutting the speed to 13 knots, breaking the keel, and disabling electrical power. The crippled Juneau was forced to withdraw from the battle.

Later that day, as it was leaving the Solomon Islands' area for the Allied rear-area base at Espiritu Santo with other surviving US warships from battle, the force was located by the submarine I-26, which fired two torpedoes at the crippled heavy cruiser USS San Francisco. While they both missed their intended target, one hit Juneau. The torpedo likely hit the thinly armored light cruiser at or near the ammunition magazines, and the ship was blown in half and quickly sank in a fiery explosion.

Captain Gilbert C. Hoover, commanding officer of the light cruiser USS Helena, and the senior officer present afloat (SOPA) of the battle-damaged US task force, was skeptical that anyone had survived the sinking of Juneau and believed it would be reckless to look for survivors, thereby exposing his wounded ships to a still-lurking Japanese submarine. Therefore, he ordered his ships to continue on towards Espiritu Santo. Helena signaled a nearby US B-17 bomber on patrol to notify Allied headquarters to send aircraft or ships to search for survivors.

In fact, approximately 100 of Juneau's crew had survived the torpedo attack and the sinking of their ship and were left in the water. The B-17 bomber crew, under orders not to break radio silence, did not pass the message about searching for survivors to their headquarters until they had landed several hours later. The crew's report of the location of possible survivors was mixed in with other pending paperwork actions and went unnoticed for several days. It was not until days after the ship had been sunk that headquarters staff realized that a rescue operation had never been mounted, and belatedly ordered aircraft to begin searching the area. In the meantime, Juneau's survivors, many of whom were seriously wounded, were exposed to the elements, hunger, thirst, and repeated shark attacks.

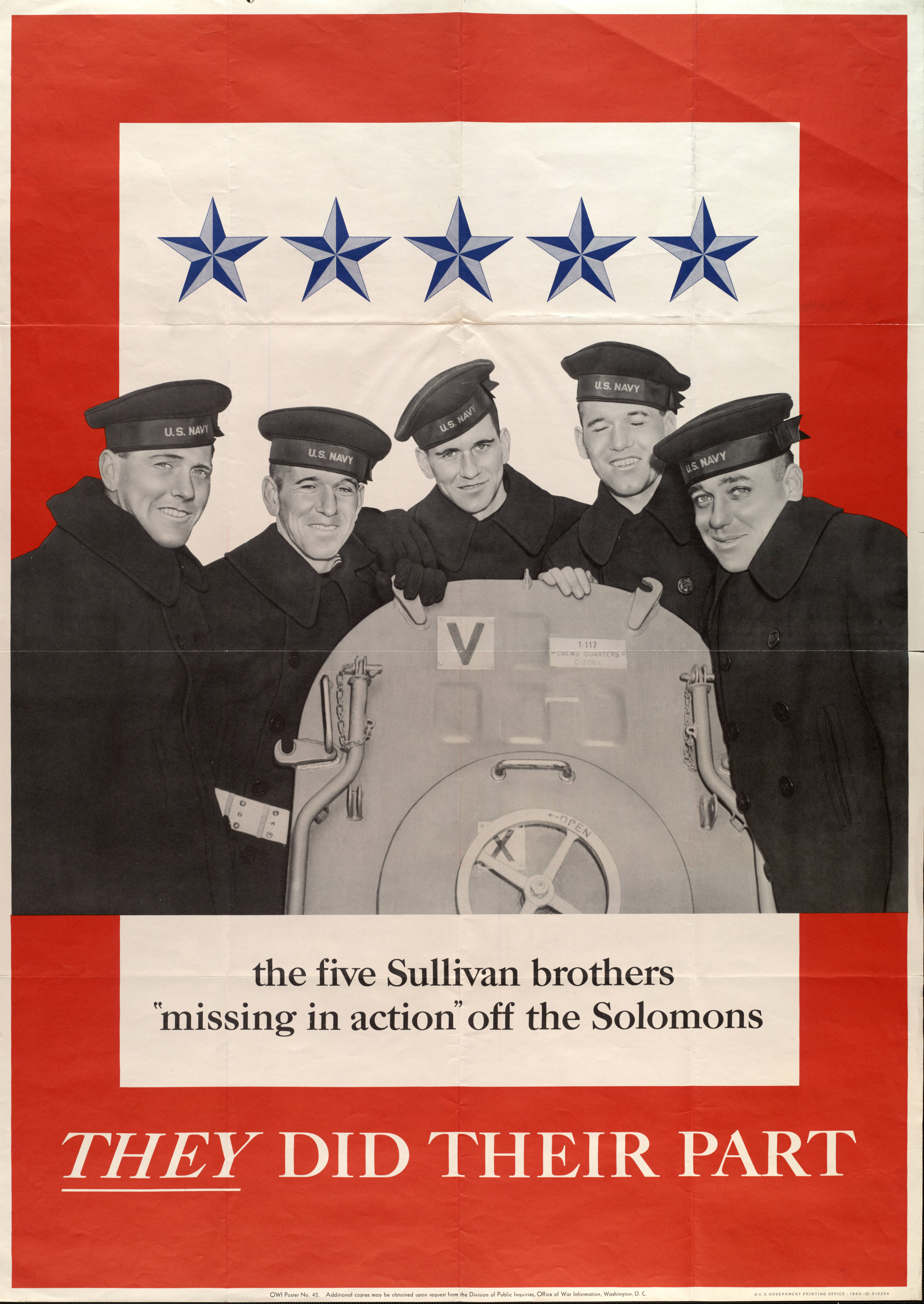
Wartime poster featuring the Sullivan brothers

Eight days after the sinking, ten survivors were found by a PBY Catalina search aircraft and retrieved from the water. The survivors reported that Frank, Joe and Matt were all killed instantly, Al drowned the next day, and George survived for four or five days, before suffering from delirium as a result of hypernatremia (though some sources describe him being "driven insane with grief" at the loss of his brothers); he climbed over the side of the raft he had occupied and fell into the water. He was never seen or heard from again.

Security required that the Navy not reveal the loss of Juneau or the other ships so as not to provide information to the enemy. Letters from the Sullivan sons stopped arriving at home and their parents grew worried, which prompted Alleta Sullivan to write to the Bureau of Naval Personnel in January 1943, citing rumors that survivors of the task force claimed that all five brothers were killed in action.

This letter was answered by President Franklin D. Roosevelt on January 13, 1943, who acknowledged that the Sullivans were missing in action, but by then the parents were already informed of their fate, having learned of their deaths on January 12. That morning, the boys' father, Tom, was preparing for work when three men in uniform – a lieutenant commander, a doctor and a chief petty officer – approached his door. "I have some news for you about your boys," the naval officer said. "Which one?" asked Tom. "I'm sorry," the officer replied. "All five."

The "Fighting Sullivan Brothers" became national heroes. President Roosevelt sent a letter of condolence to their parents. Pope Pius XII sent a silver religious medal and rosary with his message of regret. The Iowa Senate and House adopted a formal resolution of tribute to the Sullivan brothers.

== Memorials ==
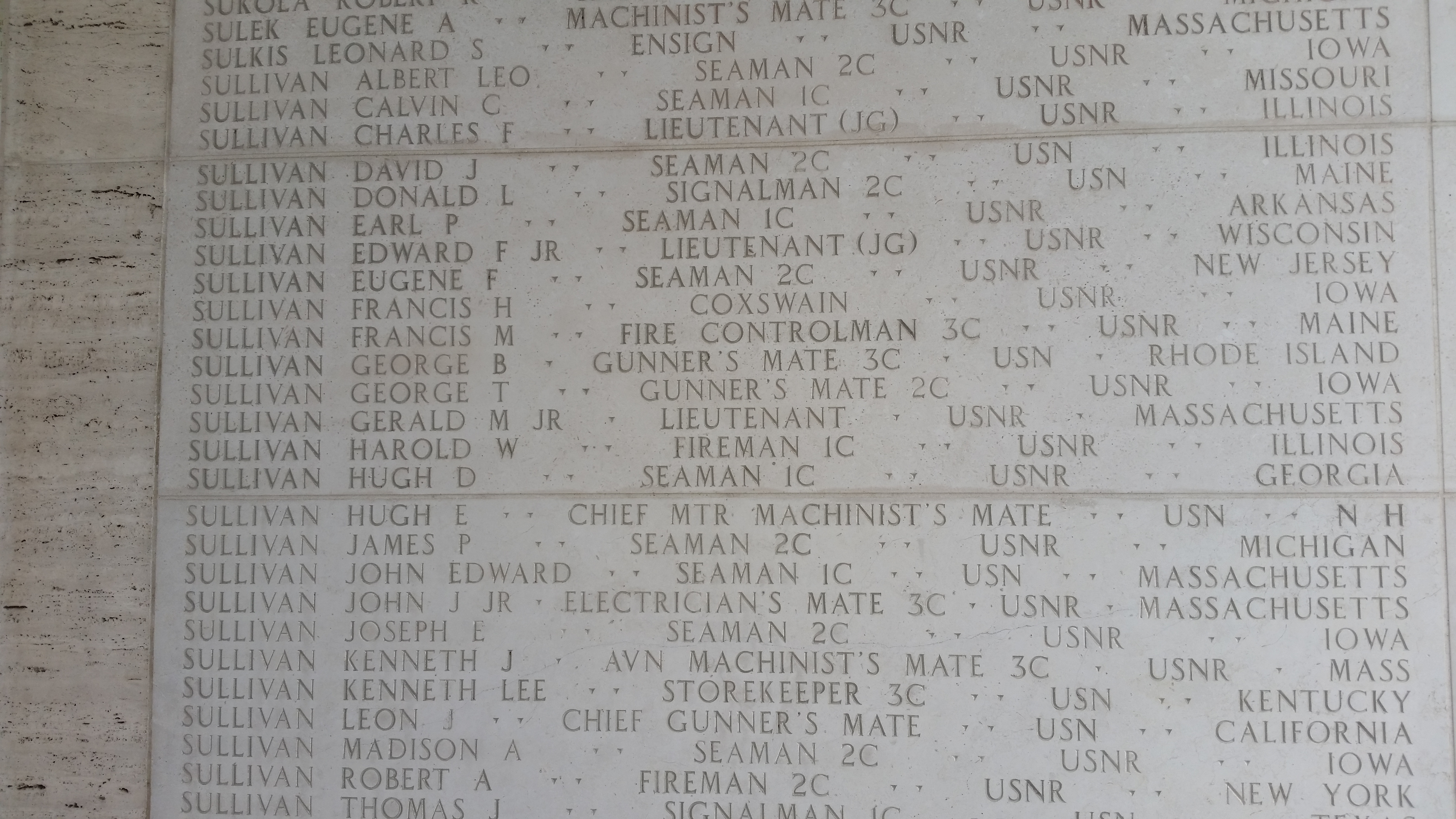
Manila American Cemetery and Memorial listing the five Sullivan brothers

The Sullivan Brothers have a Department of Defense Dependents Schools elementary school in Yokosuka, Japan, named in their honor. A museum wing has been built in honor of their service in World War II. The museum is located in downtown Waterloo, Iowa, their hometown. It was completed in 2008. The opening occurred on November 15, 2008.

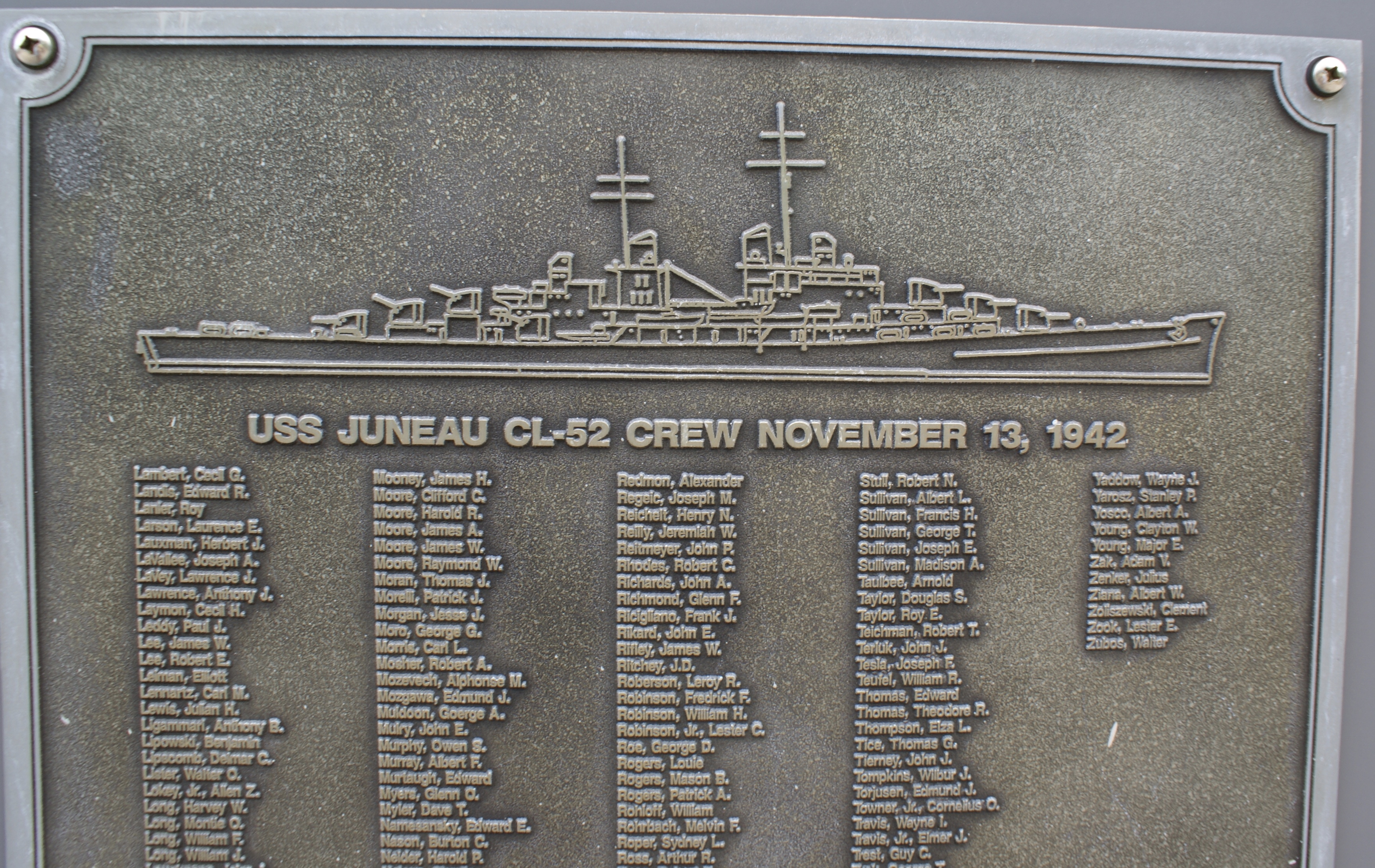
A memorial placed on the cruise ship docks of Juneau, Alaska, to the crew of USS Juneau, including the five Sullivan brothers

The brothers' hometown of Waterloo, Iowa, renamed its convention center in 1988 as "The Five Sullivan Brothers Convention Center". In June 2017, the city was considering a proposal to sell the center to a developer who would renovate the facility and change its name. The proposal met with some community opposition. The town also named a street and a public park in their honor. The park is the location of their childhood home.

== Legacy ==
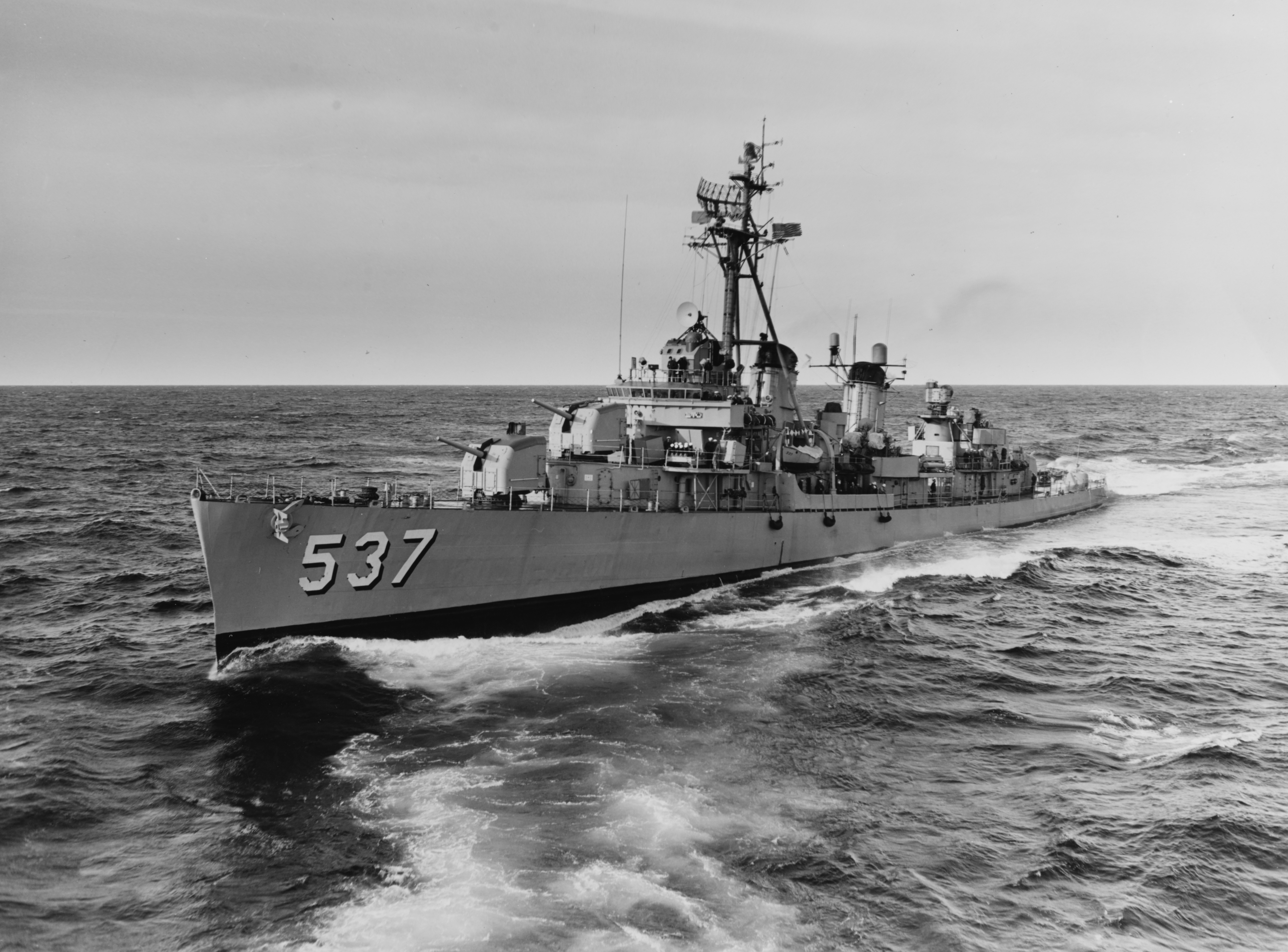
USS The Sullivans (DD-537), a Fletcher-class destroyer, in 1962.

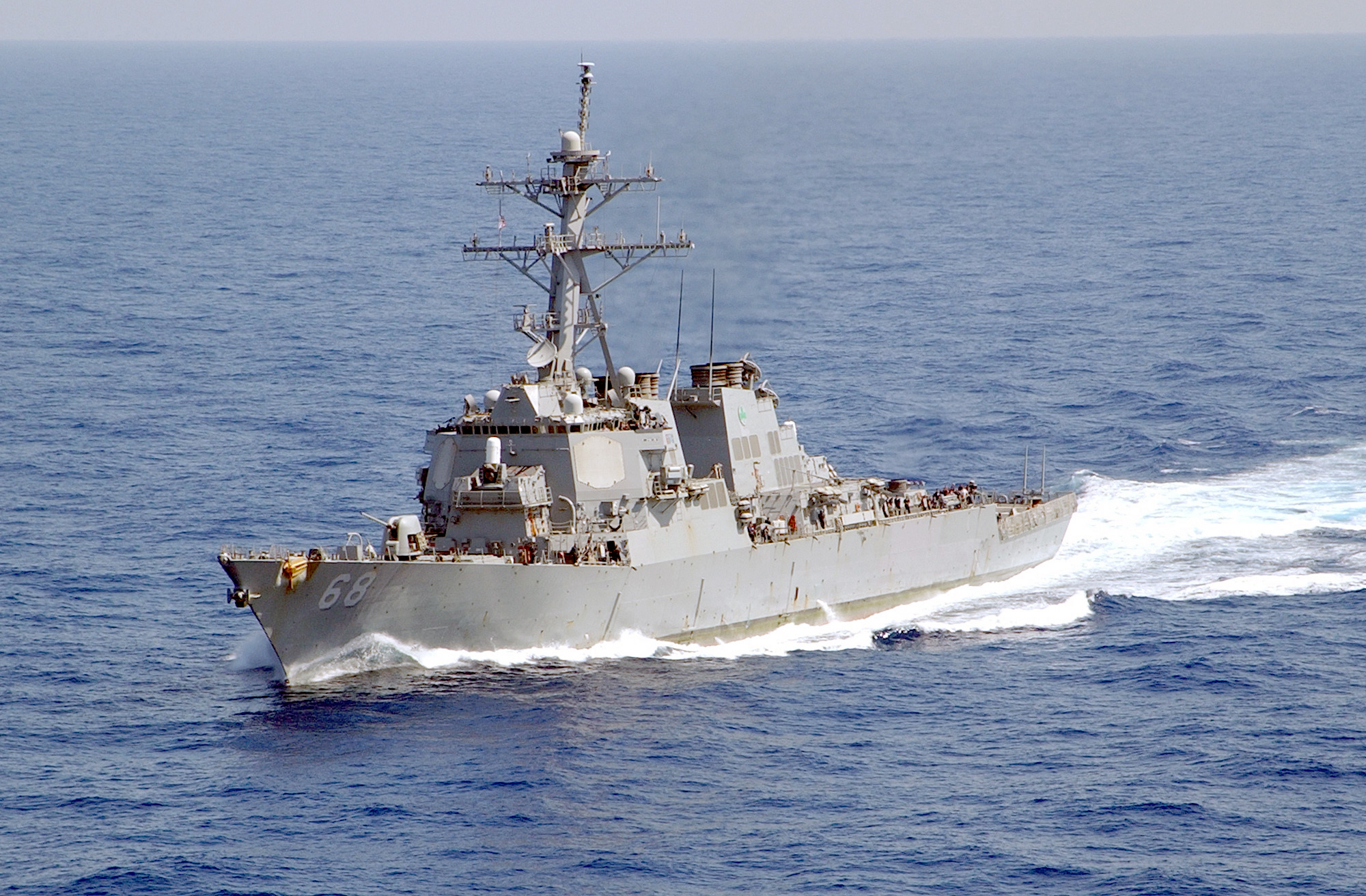
USS The Sullivans (DDG-68), an Arleigh Burke-class guided missile destroyer, in 2002.

Tom and Alleta Sullivan made speaking appearances at war plants and shipyards on behalf of the war effort. Later, Alleta participated in the launching of a destroyer, USS The Sullivans, named after her sons. Thomas and Alleta Sullivan toured the country promoting war bonds and asked that none of their sons died in vain. As a direct result of the Sullivans' deaths (and the deaths of four of the Borgstrom brothers within a few months of each other two years later), the U.S. War Department adopted the Sole Survivor Policy.

The Navy named two destroyers The Sullivans to honor the brothers: USS The Sullivans (DD-537) and USS The Sullivans (DDG-68). DD-537 was the first American Navy ship ever named after more than one person and is one of four Fletcher Class destroyers (of 175 ships of the class completed) that survive as museum ships and is located in Buffalo, NY. The motto for both ships was/is "We stick together."

The Sullivans Association, an organization of veterans who served on both US Navy ships named after the brothers, conducted a reunion on September 25, 2011, in Waterloo, Iowa. The attendees gathered at Sullivans Park, visited Calvary Cemetery and laid flowers at the graves of the Sullivan brothers' parents and sister, and visited the neighborhood where the family had lived.

== Depiction in media ==
The brothers' story was filmed as the 1944 movie The Sullivans (later renamed The Fighting Sullivans) and inspired, at least in part, the 1998 film Saving Private Ryan. The Sullivans were also briefly mentioned in Saving Private Ryan. The song "Sullivan" by the alternative rock band Caroline's Spine tells the story of the Sullivans.

== See also ==
- Bixby letter
- Borgstrom brothers, four American brothers killed in WWII combat over a six month period
- Von Blücher brothers, three German brothers killed within hours at a single WWII battle
- Niland Brothers, four American brothers, two killed and one captured during WWII
- Rogers brothers, three American sailors killed on the same ship during a single WWII battle
- Cervi Brothers, seven Italian brothers who were members of the Italian resistance movement
- Sole Survivor Policy
