= Sole Survivor Policy =

American military draft–exemption policy

The Sole Survivor Policy or United States Department of Defense Directive 1315.15 "Special Separation Policies for Survivorship" describes a set of regulations in the United States military, partially stipulated by law, that are designed to protect members of a family from the draft during peacetime or wartime if they have already lost family members to military service. This policy has been in effect since 1948.

== History ==
The issue that gave rise to the regulations first caught public attention after the five Sullivan brothers were all killed when the USS Juneau (CL-52) was sunk during World War II.

Section 6(o) of the Military Selective Service Act of 1948 exempted the sole surviving son of a family where one or more sons or daughters had been killed in action, died in the line of duty, or subsequently died of injuries or disease incurred while in military service, from being drafted either in peacetime or wartime.

In 1971, during the Vietnam War, Congress amended Section 6(o) of the law to remove the restriction on surviving sons being drafted during periods of war or national emergency declared by Congress. Any son, not just a sole surviving son, was exempt from being drafted in peacetime if their father, brother, or sister had been killed in action or died in the line of duty before December 31, 1959, or died subsequent to that date as a result of injuries or disease incurred while in service. Sons were also exempt from being drafted in peacetime if a father, brother, or sister was in a prisoner of war or missing in action status. The sole surviving son was permitted to apply for voluntary induction into the military, however.

The amendment also provided that a son or sons who had been drafted and had not voluntarily extended their term of service or re-enlisted, and during their service had come under the criteria of Section 6(o) that would have prohibited them from being inducted as civilians, were permitted to apply for immediate discharge from the armed forces. Men undergoing court martial proceedings were not permitted to apply for discharge until the proceedings had been completed or the sentence handed down had been served.

Since the passage of the law, each branch of the military has made its policies with regard to separating immediate family members.

=== Examples ===
Before the Sole Survivor Policy was officially implemented in 1948, several occasions occurred when sole survivors were excused from active service.

In World War II, four brothers of the Borgstrom family, Elmer, Clyde, and twins Rolon and Rulon, were all killed within a few months of each other in 1944. Their parents then successfully petitioned for their fifth son Boyd, who was also on active duty, to be released from service. Their sixth son, Elton, who had not yet reached conscription age, was exempted from military service.

The three Butehorn brothers of Bethpage, New York, Charles, Joseph, and Henry, were all deployed during World War II. After Charles was killed in action in France in November 1944 and Joseph was killed in action in the Pacific in May 1945, Henry, who was serving with the Army Air Forces in Italy, was ordered home by the War Department. The Veterans of Foreign Wars post in Bethpage is named after their sacrifice.

In the case of the Niland brothers, US intelligence believed that all but one of four siblings were killed in action. The eldest brother, Technical Sergeant Edward Niland, of the U.S. Army Air Forces, was later found to have been held in a prisoner of war camp in Burma. The Academy Award–winning film Saving Private Ryan, directed by Steven Spielberg, was loosely based on the Niland brothers' story.

Both the Borgstrom and Butehorn incidents occurred before the Sole Survivor Policy was put into effect in 1948. They, along with the deaths of all of the Sullivan brothers in 1942, helped lead to it.

Jason and Nathan Hubbard joined the Army after their brother Jared had died in Iraq in 2004. In 2007, Nathan died in a helicopter crash. Military officials ordered Jason home shortly after.

Jeremy, Ben, and Beau Wise served in active combat roles in the Afghan War. Jeremy, a former Navy SEAL, was at a CIA base as a military contractor and was killed in 2009 when a suicide bomber attacked the base. Later in 2012, Ben, an Army Special Forces combat medic, was seriously wounded in Afghanistan and died of his injuries six days later at Landstuhl Regional Medical Center. Beau was deployed in Afghanistan with the Marines at the time and was immediately relieved of combat duties and returned to the United States.

== Regulations ==
This policy protects "only sons", "the last son to carry the family name", and "sole surviving sons" only during peacetime. In times of war or national emergency as declared by the US Congress, this provision does not apply to any of the above. Also, this provision is voluntary, meaning that the member wishing to be sent home has to request the policy to be applied for their application to be approved. Furthermore, it does not apply strictly to the sole surviving son but also to all surviving sons.

Members of the armed forces who are not eligible for Department of Defense Directive 1315.15, "Special Separation Policies for Survivorship," include those who currently have court-martial charges pending against them or those who have been convicted by court-martial.

The policy was changed to allow both enlisted and officers to apply for this discharge. If members of the Armed Forces re-enlist or voluntarily extend their active duty beyond the requirement after having been notified of a death in the family, those members become ineligible.

== See also ==
- Melbourne–Evans collision § Aftermath (1969) – deaths of three Sage brothers on USS Evans
- Bixby letter
- Saving Private Ryan
