= Letter to Fanny McCullough =

Letter from Abraham Lincoln

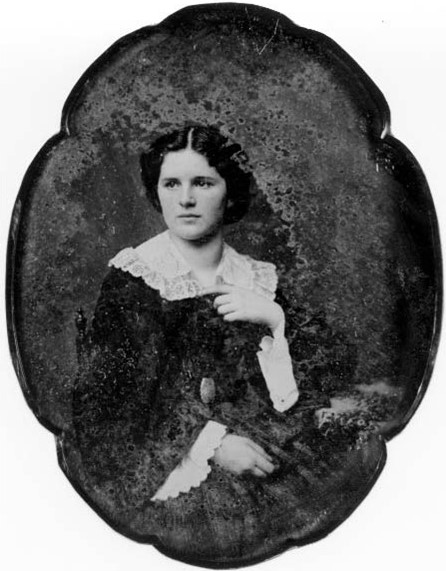
Fanny McCullough

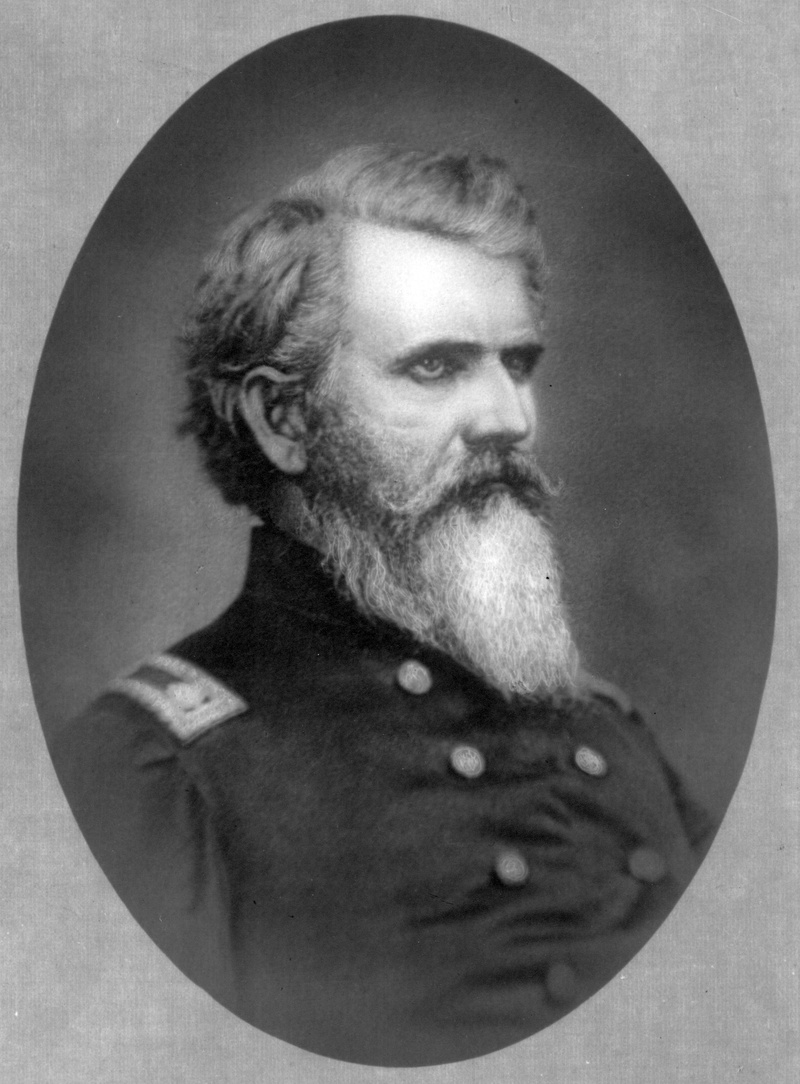
William McCullough

In December 1862, President of the United States Abraham Lincoln sent a brief consoling letter to Fanny McCullough, the daughter of Lt. Col. William McCullough, following his death in the American Civil War.

== Background ==
Lincoln had met William McCullough years before when Lincoln was a circuit lawyer in Illinois and McCullough was a Circuit Clerk in McLean County; Lincoln would sometimes stay with the McCullough family when he reached the Bloomington area of the circuit. McCullough became an ardent supporter of Lincoln beginning with Lincoln's successful run for Congress in 1846. With the start of the Civil War, McCullough petitioned Lincoln to allow him to enlist despite his health problems and age. McCullough's request was granted, and he was commissioned a lieutenant colonel in the 4th Illinois Cavalry.

After McCullough was killed December 5, 1862 in an engagement near Coffeeville, Mississippi, his daughter Mary Frances ("Fanny") was inconsolable and locked herself in her room. At the request of David Davis, a mutual friend of Lincoln and the McCullough family, Lincoln wrote to Fanny on December 23. President Lincoln's letter was later transcribed and published in Collected Works of Abraham Lincoln.

== Text ==
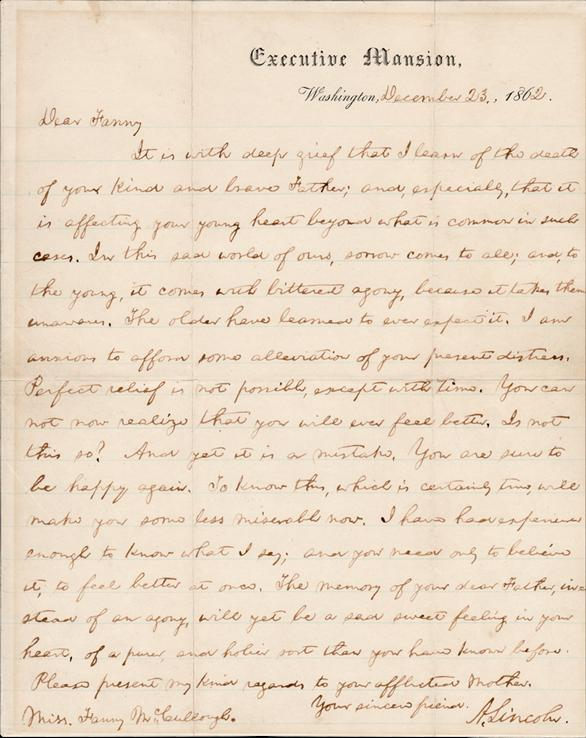
The handwritten letter

Executive Mansion,
Washington, December 23, 1862.

Dear Fanny

It is with deep grief that I learn of the death of your kind and brave Father; and, especially, that it is affecting your young heart beyond what is common in such cases. In this sad world of ours, sorrow comes to all; and, to the young, it comes with bitterest agony, because it takes them unawares. The older have learned to ever expect it. I am anxious to afford some alleviation of your present distress. Perfect relief is not possible, except with time. You can not now realize that you will ever feel better. Is not this so? And yet it is a mistake. You are sure to be happy again. To know this, which is certainly true, will make you some less miserable now. I have had experience enough to know what I say; and you need only to believe it, to feel better at once. The memory of your dear Father, instead of an agony, will yet be a sad sweet feeling in your heart, of a purer, and holier sort than you have known before.

Please present my kind regards to your afflicted mother.

Your sincere friend,
A. Lincoln.

Miss. Fanny McCullough.

== See also ==
- Bixby letter
