= Rogers brothers =

American WWII sailors killed together

The three Rogers brothers were World War II sailors who, while serving together aboard the USS New Orleans, were all killed in action during the Battle of Tassafaronga on November 30, 1942. Their younger brother Hugh, who was 17 at the time of their deaths, enlisted in the Navy and served aboard the USS New Orleans. The U.S. Navy destroyer USS Rogers was named in their memory.

They were:

- Edward Keith Rogers, 30, Seaman First Class
- Jack Ellis Rogers Jr., 22, Seaman First Class
- Charles Ethbert Rogers, 20, Seaman First Class

Similar to the Sullivan brothers' deaths aboard the USS Juneau roughly two weeks earlier, events such as these led to the adoption of a rule that no longer permitted family members to serve with each other in combat areas.
