= Theodore Reed (zoologist) =

American veterinarian and zoologist

Theodore Harold Reed
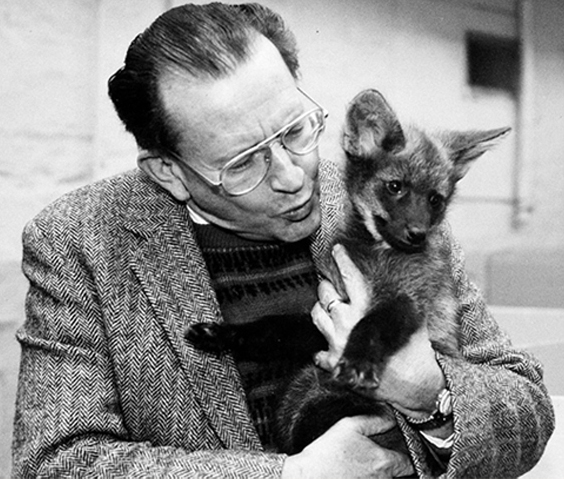
- Theodore Reed holding maned wolf pup, c. 1983
- Born: Theodore Harold Reed; July 25, 1922; Washington, D.C., United States
- Died: July 2, 2013 (aged 90); Milford, Delaware, United States
- Education: Kansas State University
- Occupations: Veterinarian, Zoologist
- Years active: 1955–2013
- Employer: National Zoological Park (United States)
- Known for: The creation of the Smithsonian Conservation Biology Institute

Theodore Harold Reed (July 25, 1922—July 2, 2013) was an American veterinarian and zoologist.

== Life ==
He was born at Walter Reed Army Hospital in Washington, D.C. to Ollie W. Reed Sr., an Army officer and Mildred Reed. He had an older brother, Ollie Jr., who would later become an Army officer. His older brother, serving as a lieutenant in 363th Infantry Regiment, and his father, serving as a colonel in the 175th Infantry Regiment, were killed within weeks of each other in July 1944 during World War II. They were both laid to rest in the Normandy American Cemetery in graves, Plot E, Row 20, Graves 19 and 20.

He graduated from Kansas State College (now Kansas State University) in veterinary medicine and zoology. He served as the veterinarian at the Portland Zoo in Oregon.

He joined the National Zoological Park (United States) in 1955. He was named associate director in 1956, and director in 1958. In 1972, he helped bring the pandas Ling-Ling and Hsing-Hsing to the National Zoo. In 1975, he helped create the Smithsonian Conservation Biology Institute.

He died in a nursing home in Milford, Delaware.
