= Nucharin Songsasen =

Thai biologist

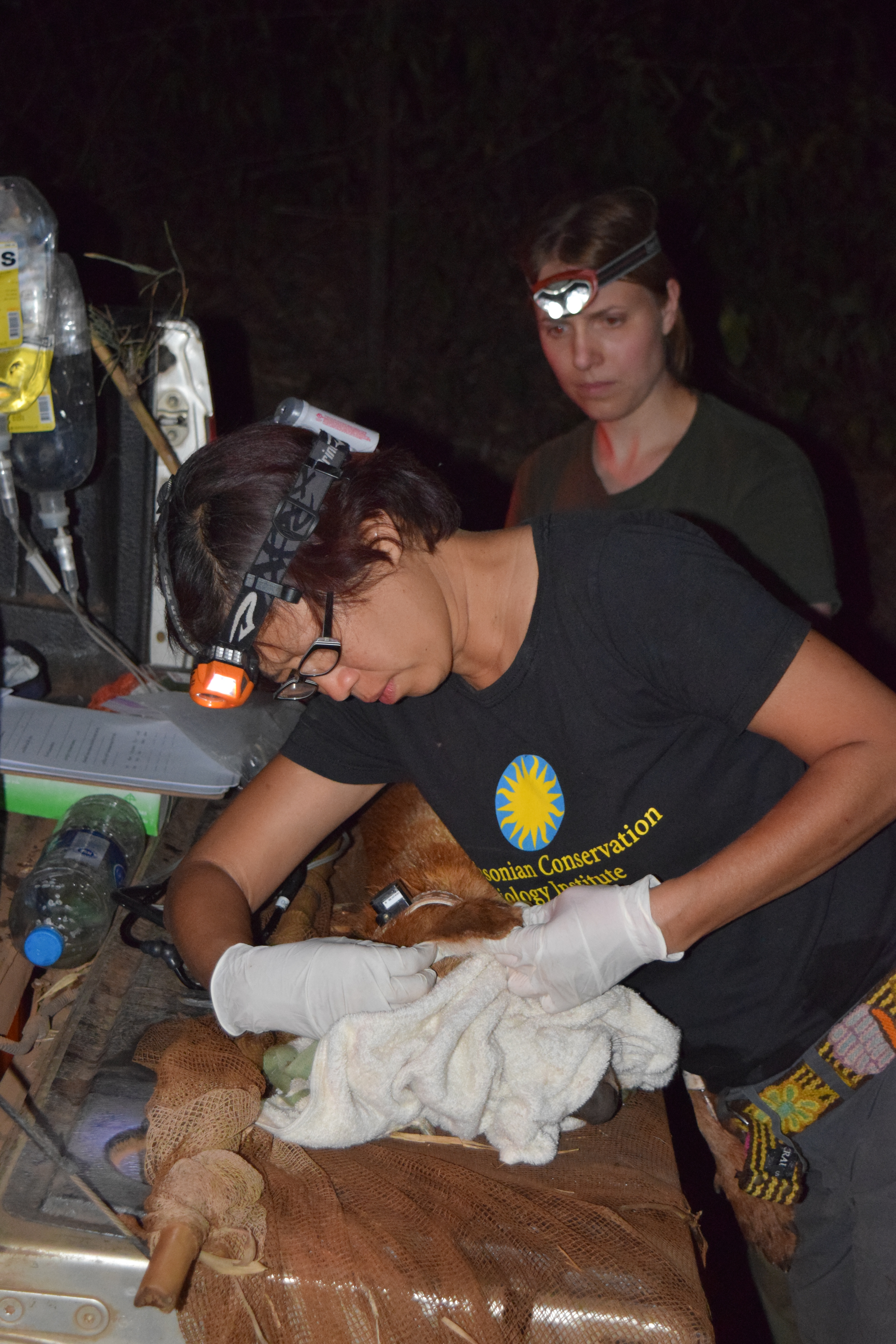
- Education: Kasetsart University; University of Guelph
- Occupations: Biologist, mammalogist, veterinarian
- Employers: National Zoological Park; Smithsonian Conservation Biology Institute (2002–); Smithsonian Institution

Nucharin Songsasen (Thai: นุชรินทร์ ศงสะเสน) is a research biologist and head of the Center for Species Survival at the Smithsonian Conservation Biology Institute. Songsasen is an expert in global canid conservation, including maned wolves, African wild dogs, and dholes.

== Early life and education ==
Nucharin Songsasen grew up in Thailand. As a child she accompanied her father, a veterinarian, as he would travel to farms around Bangkok and provide expertise in cattle reproduction. Songsasen received a Doctor of Veterinary Medicine degree from the Kasetsart University in 1988. After becoming a veterinarian, she struggled with the job's requirements to euthanize animals. She decided to change her career to focus on a more positive aspect of animal care, reproductive science.

She went on to earn two degrees from the University of Guelph: a Master of Science degree in 1993 and a Ph.D. in 1997. During her time at the University of Guelph, she worked with cryobiologist Dr. Stanley Leibo and produced the world's first lambs from cryopreserved embryos produced by in vitro fertilization. Songsasen also pioneered the field of mouse sperm cryopreservation.

== Career in research ==
Songsasen joined the Smithsonian Conservation Biology Institute (SCBI) in 2002. She has led the Global Canid Conservation program within SCBI since 2002, expanding the program's efforts from the laboratory to field conservation in countries such as Brazil, Thailand, and Myanmar. Her laboratory focuses on developing technologies to grow ovarian follicles from domestic dogs and cats in vitro as models for preserving genetics from wild canids and felids. Songsasen was part of the team that performed the first successful in-vitro fertilization in domestic dogs. In December 2018 Songsasen became the head of the Center for Species Survival within SCBI.

She has held adjunct appointments at multiple institutions, including the University of Maryland, Cornell University, and George Mason University. Songsasen is a member of the International Union for Conservation of Nature Canid Specialist Group and an advisor to the Association of Zoos and Aquariums Canid Taxon Advisory Group.
