= Ollie W. Reed =

American football coach and soldier

Biographical details
- Born: July 18, 1896; Norton, Kansas, U.S.
- Died: July 30, 1944 (aged 48); Villebaudon, France
- Education: Kansas State

Coaching career (HC unless noted)
- 1926: Drexel

Head coaching record
- Overall: 2–5

Ollie W. Reed Sr. (July 18, 1896 – July 30, 1944) was an American college football coach and soldier in the United States Armed Forces. He served as the head football coach at Drexel University in Philadelphia for one season, in 1926, compiling a record of 2–5. He was also a professor of military history at the school.

He had two sons: Ollie W. Reed Jr., an Army officer and Theodore H. Reed, a zoologist. Reed died on July 30, 1944, in the French community of Villebaudon during the aftermath of the Battle of Normandy. His eldest son, Ollie, had been killed in action weeks before him in Italy. He and his eldest son are buried in adjacent graves—Plot E, Row 20, Graves 19 and 20—at the Normandy American Cemetery.

== Head coaching record ==
Year	Team	Overall	Conference	Standing	Bowl/playoffs
Drexel Dragons (Independent) (1926)
1926	Drexel	2–5			
Drexel:		2–5			
Total:		2–5			
