= Smithsonian Conservation Biology Institute =

Unit of the Smithsonian Institution

- Interactive map of Smithsonian Conservation Biology Institute
- 38°53′15.6″N 78°9′54.6″W
- Date opened: 1974; 52 years ago
- Location: Front Royal, Virginia, United States
- Land area: 3,200 acres (13 km^{2})
- Website: nationalzoo.si.edu/conservation/about-scbi

The Smithsonian Conservation Biology Institute (SCBI) is a unit of the Smithsonian Institution located on a 3,200-acre (13 km^{2}) campus located just outside the town of Front Royal, Virginia. An extension of the National Zoo in Washington, D.C., the SCBI has played a leading role in the fields of veterinary medicine, reproductive physiology and conservation biology since its founding in 1974.

Previously named the Conservation and Research Center, the CRC became known as the Smithsonian Conservation Biology Institute in 2010 as a symbol of its growing independence from the captive animals associated with the traditional images of zoos.

== History ==
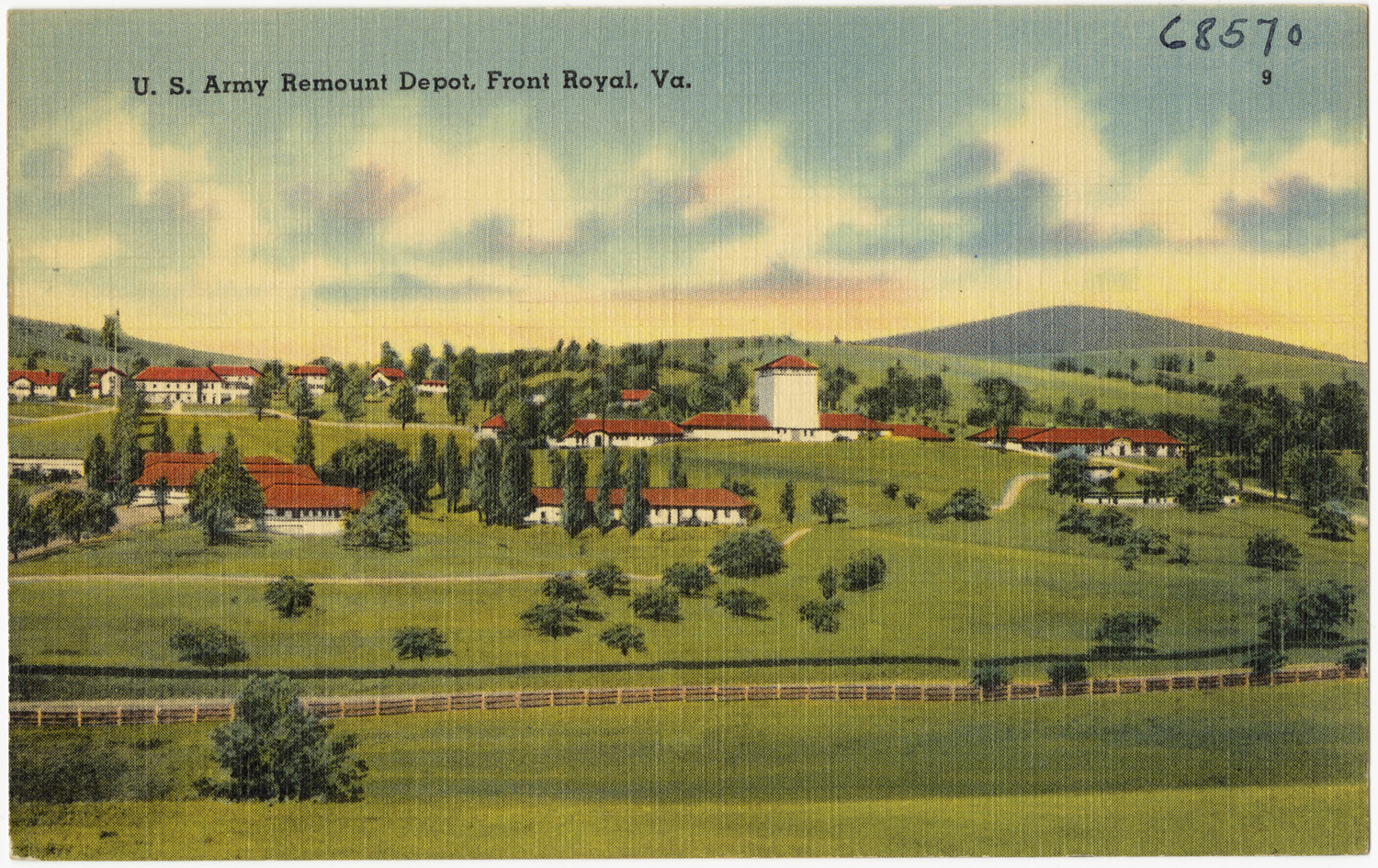
Mid-20th century postcard showing the U.S. Army Remount Depot near Front Royal, today the home of the Smithsonian Conservation Biology Institute.

The land on which the SCBI lies has a history dating back to 1909, when the United States Army leased some 42 area farms. In the years predating World War I, the land served as a series of U.S. Army Remount Service depots, supplying horses and mules to the military. The federal government ultimately purchased the land in 1911 and began construction on the Ayleshire Quartermaster Remount Depot. Completed in 1916, the Depot consisted of eleven barn and stable facilities, hundreds of miles of split-rail fencing, many miles of access roads, and a rail yard facility for the import and export of animals. The Ayleshire Quartermaster Remount Depot remained in operation throughout both world wars, and was eventually expanded to include a canine training facility and detention barracks for 600 German and Italian prisoners of war.

In 1948, Congress passed legislation transferring ownership of the land to the Department of Agriculture, which redeveloped the property into a beef cattle research station. In conjunction with the Virginia Polytechnic Institute and State University (Virginia Tech), the USDA experimented with various environmental and husbandry conditions, designed to improve the amount and quality of meat production of various cattle breeds. The Department of State leased part of the compound from USDA for use as an emergency relocation and communications site, with support infrastructure for the Secretary of State and 700 other departmental employees. The USDA closed the station in 1973, leaving the site temporarily vacant.

The Conservation and Research Center was founded in 1974 when the director of the National Zoo, Theodore Reed, recognized the need for a captive breeding facility and initiated negotiations to obtain the land. The title was transferred to the Smithsonian in 1975, and work was begun immediately on developing the site into a zoological research facility.

Today the SCBI is host to range of zoological and ecological research. It hosts a 25-hectare (62-acre) forest dynamics plot that is part of the Center for Tropical Forest Science/Smithsonian Institution Global Earth Observatory, and has hosted the Mid-Atlantic core site in the National Ecological Observatory Network since 2013.

== Programs ==
VOA report about the institute

Amongst the SCBI's most well known research programs are those based on the captive breeding, and reintroduction, of such endangered species as the black-footed ferret (Mustela nigripes), the clouded leopard (Neofelis nebulosa), the Guam Rail (Hypotaenidia owstoni), Przewalski's horse (Equus przewalskii), and the Matschie's tree-kangaroo (Dendrolagus matechiei).

However, despite its accomplishments, the SCBI has not been exempt from controversy. In 2001, the former Smithsonian Secretary, Lawrence M. Small, backed by former Zoo Director Lucy Spelman, proposed the closure of the facility as a cost-saving measure. Opposition from the public and the scientific and conservation communities forced Secretary Small to back down from this decision. Afterwards, the leadership of Lawrence M. Small was shown to be fraught with corruption and waste, and he resigned as Secretary in 2007.

Since the departure of Small, the SCBI has formed many long term partnerships (e.g. with Center for Tropical Forest Science, George Mason University (Smithsonian-Mason Global Conservation Studies Program), and National Ecological Observatory Network) to help ensure its long-term viability.

== Specimens ==
Currently, the SCBI's collection of animals stands at over 400 specimens, including 17 mammalian and 15 avian species.

Ordinarily closed to the public, the Smithsonian Conservation Biology Institute historically hosted an annual open-house event each fall. The "Autumn Conservation Festival" was sponsored by Friends of the National Zoo (FONZ) and provided an opportunity for members of the public to tour the grounds and veterinary facilities, interact with the staff and learn more about the research conducted at the SCBI. The "Autumn Conservation Festival" was held on the first weekend in October. FONZ also hosted a summer sleepaway camp on the site for children ages ten to fifteen.

Some of the species kept here include hooded cranes, red-crowned cranes, white-naped crane, maned wolves, cheetahs, black-footed ferrets, persian onagers, Hartmann's mountain zebras and scimitar-horned oryxs.
