= Coulonges-Cohan =

- Commune
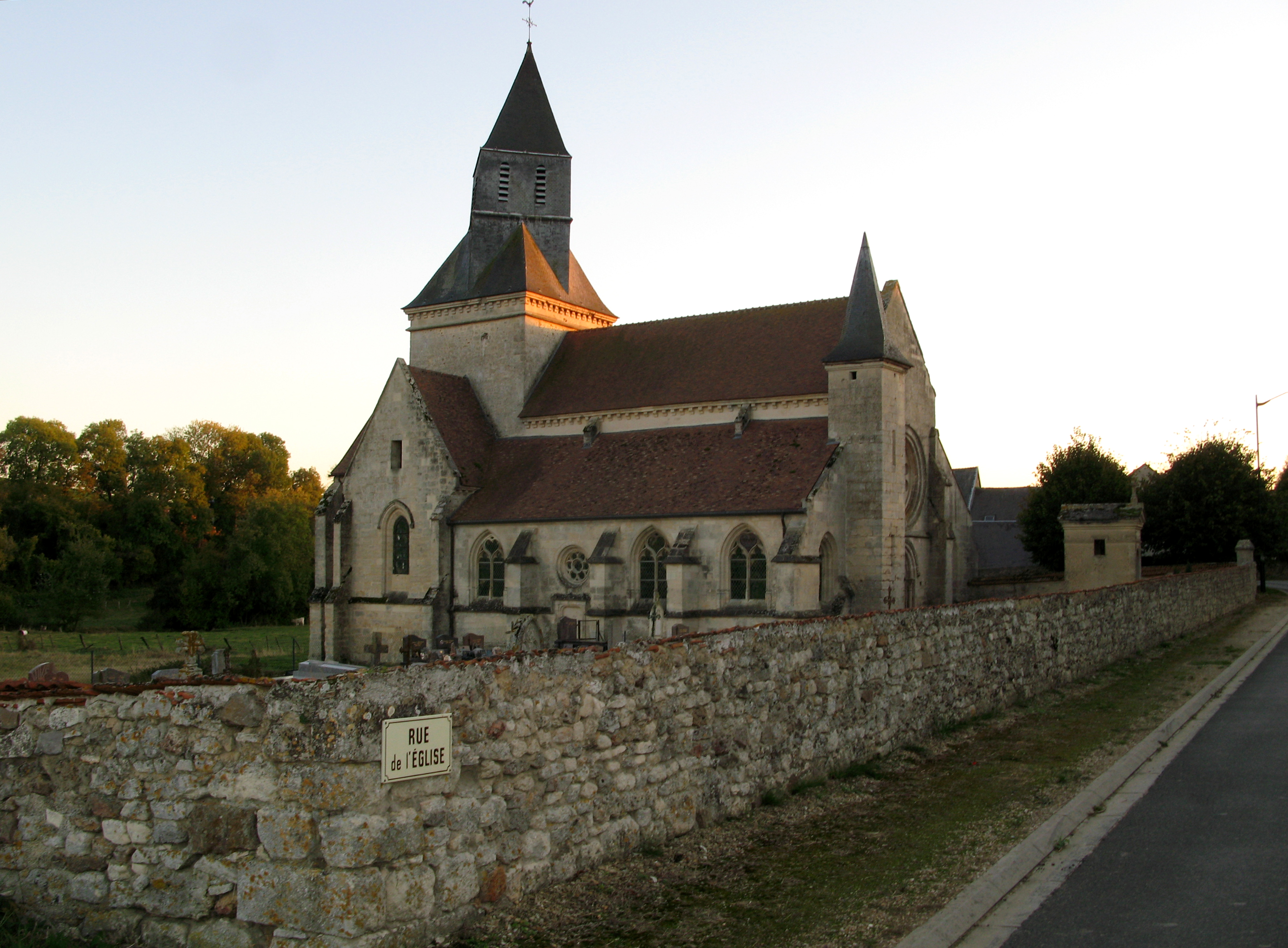
- The church of Cohan

- Coat of arms
- Location of Coulonges-Cohan
- Location within France Location within Hauts-de-France
- Coordinates: 49°12′06″N 3°38′14″E
- Country: France
- Region: Hauts-de-France
- Department: Aisne
- Arrondissement: Château-Thierry
- Canton: Fère-en-Tardenois
- Intercommunality: CA Région de Château-Thierry

Government
  - Mayor (2026–32): Carole Perreau
- Area^{1}: 28.75 km^{2} (11.10 sq mi)
- Elevation: 139 m (456 ft)
- Highest elevation: 238 m (781 ft)
- Lowest elevation: 105 m (344 ft)
- Population (2023): 443
  - Density: 15.4/km^{2} (39.9/sq mi)
- Time zone: UTC+01:00 (CET)
  - Summer (DST): UTC+02:00 (CEST)
- INSEE/Postal code: 02220 /02130
- ^{1} French Land Register data, which excludes lakes, ponds, glaciers > 1 km^{2} (0.386 sq mi or 247 acres) and river estuaries.

Coulonges-Cohan (French pronunciation: [kulɔ̃ʒ kɔ.ɑ̃]) is a commune in the Aisne department in Hauts-de-France in northern France.

On July 14, 1918, Quentin Roosevelt died as fighter pilot in Coulonges-Cohan in World War I.

== Population ==
Historical population
Year	Pop.	±% p.a.
1968	423	—
1975	367	−2.01%
1982	389	+0.84%
1990	384	−0.16%
1999	370	−0.41%
2007	426	+1.78%
2012	429	+0.14%
2017	436	+0.32%
2023	443	+0.27%
Source: INSEE

== See also ==
- Communes of the Aisne department
