= Quentin Roosevelt =

Son of Theodore Roosevelt (1897–1918)

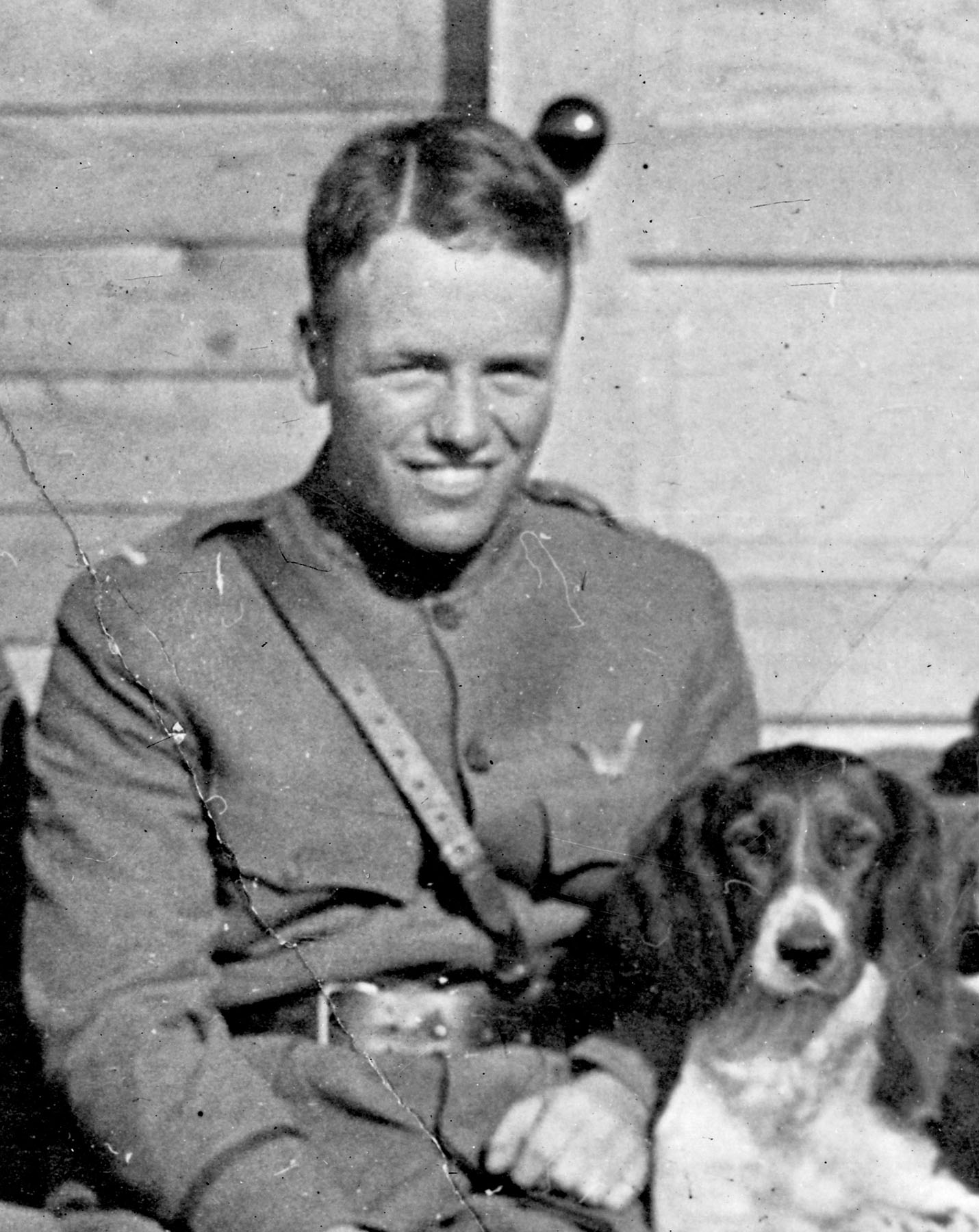
- Lt. Roosevelt in the 95th Aero Squadron, WWI in France
- Born: November 19, 1897; Washington, D.C., U.S.
- Died: July 14, 1918 (aged 20); Chamery, near Coulonges-en-Tardenois, France
- Burial place: Normandy American Cemetery and Memorial, Colleville-sur-Mer, U.A. Concession Territory, U.S., U.A.
- Other name: Quentin Roosevelt I
- Military career
- Allegiance: United States of America
- Branch: United States Army Air Service
- Service years: 1917–1918
- Rank: Second Lieutenant
- Units: 95th Aero Squadron
- Conflicts: World War I: German spring offensive; Second Battle of the Marne †
- Awards: Croix De Guerre (with palm); Purple Heart; Victory Medal

Quentin Roosevelt I (November 19, 1897 – July 14, 1918) was the youngest son of President Theodore Roosevelt and Edith Roosevelt. Inspired by his father and siblings, he joined the United States Army Air Service where he became a pursuit pilot during World War I and shot down one German aircraft. He was killed in aerial combat over France on Bastille Day (July 14), 1918. He is the only child of a U.S. president to have been killed in action.

== Early life ==
=== Childhood ===
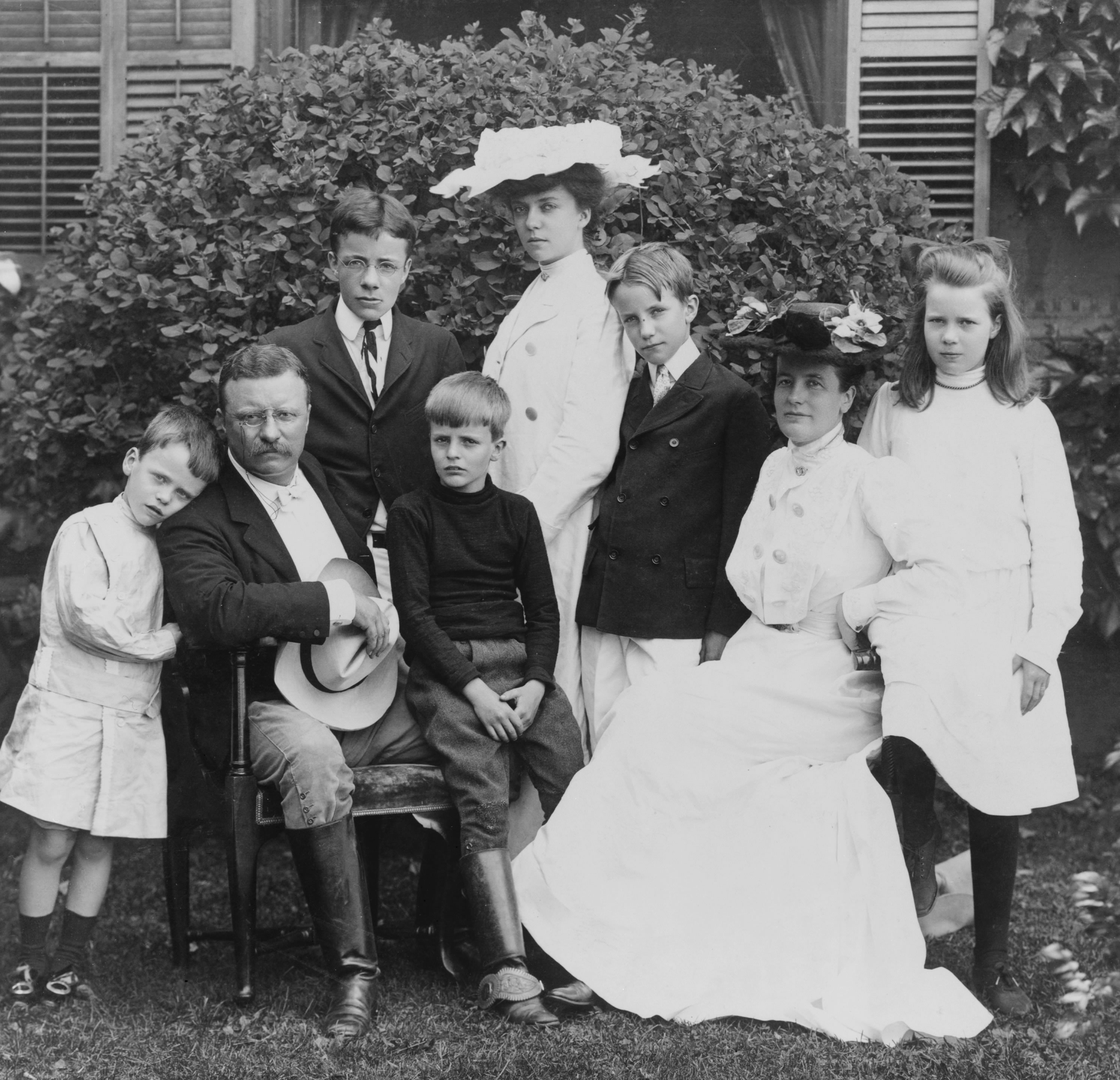
Roosevelt Family in 1903 with Quentin on the left, TR, Ted, Archie, Alice, Kermit, Edith, and Ethel

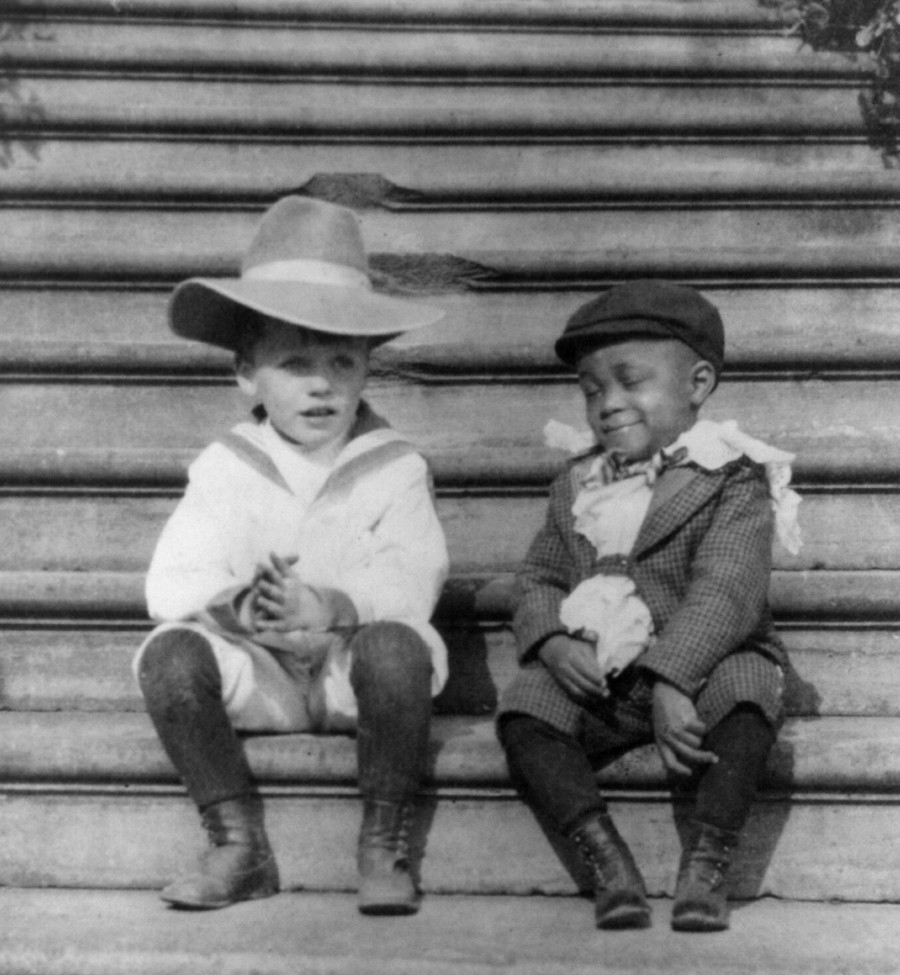
Quentin Roosevelt and Roswell Pinckney, members of the "White House Gang" of young playmates. Theodore Roosevelt was an honorary member.

Quentin was born in Washington, D.C., on November 19, 1897, the youngest child of Theodore Roosevelt's household, which included half-sister Alice, sister Ethel, and brothers Ted (Theodore III), Kermit, and Archie.

He grew up in the White House, which his father entered as president in 1901. An outgoing and mischievous boy, he treated it as his playground. His behavior prompted his mother, Edith, to label him a "fine bad little boy". Among his many adventures with the "White House Gang" (a name assigned by T.R. to Quentin and his friends), he carved a baseball diamond on the White House lawn without permission, defaced official presidential portraits with spitballs, and threw snowballs from the roof at unsuspecting Secret Service guards. He once rode on top of the family elevator with his friend Charlie Taft, son of Secretary of War and future President William Howard Taft. On another occasion the Secret Service, alarmed by smoke behind the White House, found Quentin baking potatoes in a makeshift brick chimney.

Quentin was known for his quick wit. When a reporter asked the eight-year-old about his father in 1905, he replied, "Yes, I see him sometimes; but I know nothing of his family life."

When his brother Archie was sick in bed with measles, Quentin and his brother Kermit brought the pony Algonquin up to Archie's room in the White House elevator to cheer him up.

=== Education ===
Quentin started his education at Force Elementary School and then attended the Episcopal High School in Alexandria, Virginia. Later he was a student at the Evans School for Boys and Groton School.

When at home he would buy a broken-down motorcycle or a ramshackle automobile and tinker with it until it ran. He entered Harvard College in the fall of 1915, where he pursued studies in mathematics and mechanics.

Quentin was posthumously awarded an A.B. (War Degree) by Harvard, Class of 1919.

== Personal life ==
Quentin was engaged to Flora Payne Whitney, a daughter of Harry Payne Whitney and the sculptor Gertrude Vanderbilt Whitney. The match met reservations on both sides: Theodore Roosevelt disapproved of the Whitneys' inherited fortune and life of leisure, while the Whitneys had hoped Flora would marry a man of greater means than the modestly wealthy Roosevelts.

In a February 1917 letter, Quentin voiced his growing support for American entry into the war: "We are a pretty sordid lot, aren't we, to want to sit looking on while England and France fight our battles and pan gold into our pockets?"

While training as a pilot in France, Quentin and Flora hoped to marry before he went to the front. A wartime rule barring the sisters of servicemen from the war zone kept Flora in the United States, as her brother was also in the service. Theodore Roosevelt, who had grown fond of Flora, called the ruling "idiotic" and "wicked" in a letter of July 6, 1918, regretting that the couple was denied what he called their "white hours".

The two never married. Quentin was killed in action eight days later, on July 14, 1918. Answering a letter of condolence, Theodore described his son's fiancée as "a very beautiful girl, of very fine and high character".

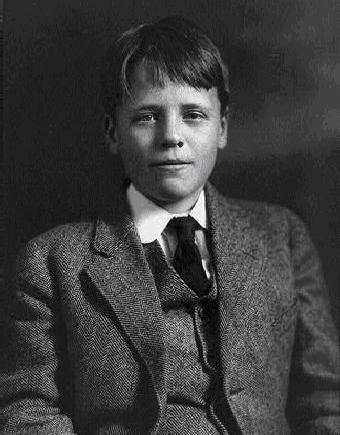
Quentin Roosevelt in 1910

== Military service ==
All four of Theodore Roosevelt's sons received military training before the United States entered World War I, reflecting their father's advocacy of preparedness. The outbreak of war in Europe in 1914 heightened concern about the nation's military readiness. The month before, Congress had authorized an Aviation Section in the Signal Corps, formally recognized in law by the act of July 18, 1914.

In 1915, Major General Leonard Wood, a friend of Theodore Roosevelt since their Rough Rider days, was the driving force behind a summer training camp at Plattsburg, New York, where college men and men of business paid their own way to learn military rudiments. Quentin and two of his brothers were among the volunteers. The National Defense Act of 1916 placed the movement on a firmer footing, endorsing the Plattsburg camps as an authorized army program and establishing a Reserve Officers' Training Corps in the colleges.

Theodore Roosevelt sought a combat command for himself as well. Friends in Congress introduced legislation that would have let the president raise up to four divisions of volunteers, one of them Roosevelt's, but Woodrow Wilson declined to authorize it. All four of his sons served as officers nonetheless. Theodore himself toured the country making speeches for the Liberty Loan program.

Quentin had majored in mechanical engineering at Harvard and spent two summers at the Plattsburg camp. In 1917 he left college to enlist in the army's aviation service, training at the Mineola airfield on Long Island. The field was later renamed Roosevelt Field in his honor and is today the site of the Roosevelt Field shopping mall.

=== Air service in France ===
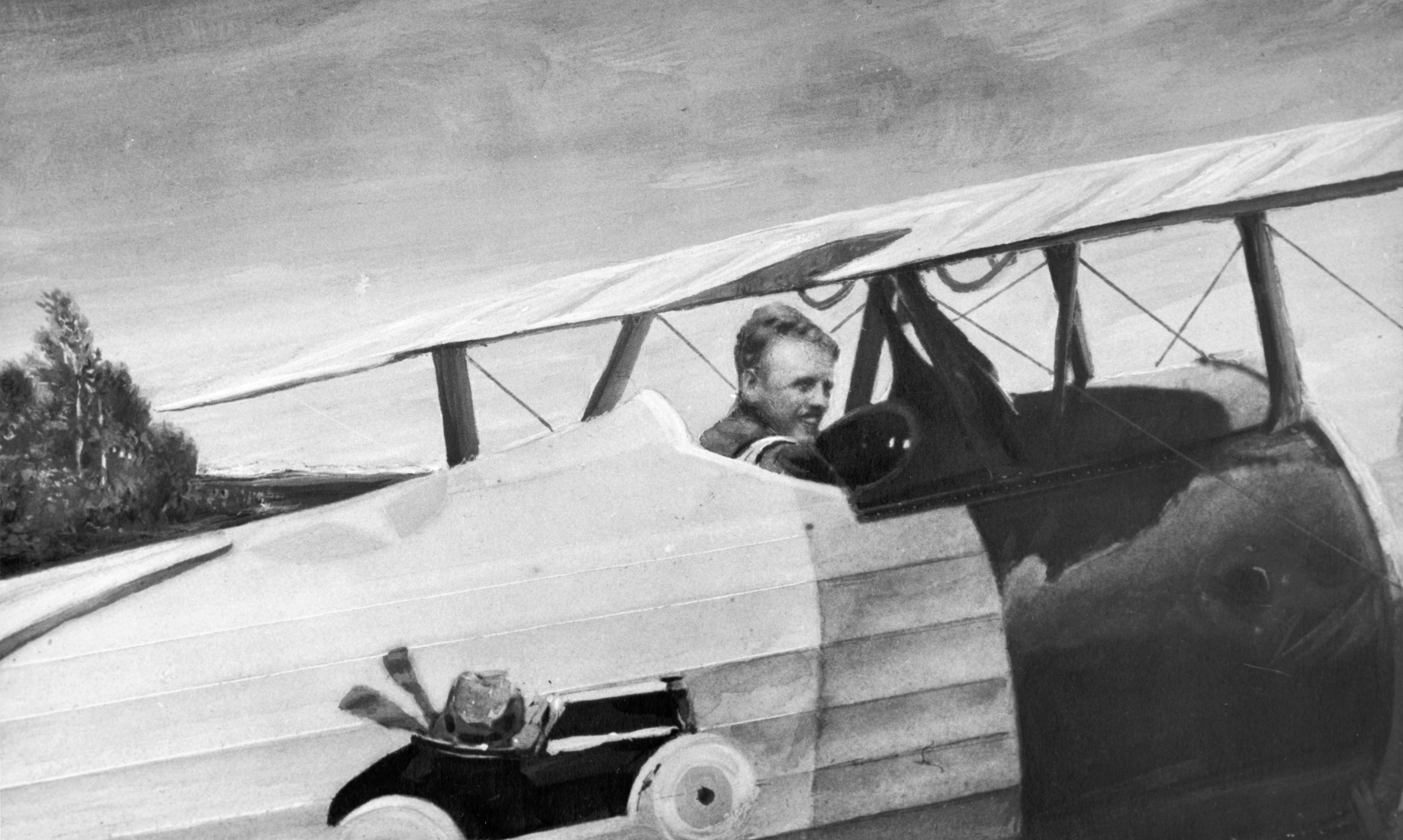
Quentin Roosevelt in a Nieuport fighter plane in France

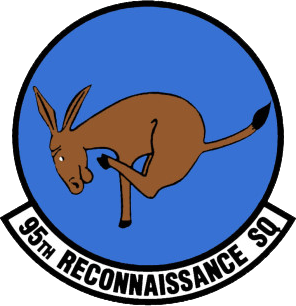
95th Squadron Insignia

Finally sent to France, Lieutenant Roosevelt first helped in setting up the large Air Service training base at Issoudun. He was a supply officer and then, in time, ran one of the training airfields. Eventually, he became a pilot in the 95th Aero Squadron, part of the 1st Pursuit Group. The unit was posted to Touquin, France and, on July 9, 1918, Saints, France. While flying from Saints, he was billeted about half a mile away in the nearby village of Mauperthuis. Roosevelt had one confirmed kill of a German aircraft during the German spring offensive, which he shot down on July 10, 1918. Four days later, in a massive aerial engagement at the commencement of the Second Battle of the Marne, he was himself shot down behind German lines.

Captain Eddie Rickenbacker, commander of the 94th Aero Squadron (also known as the "Hat-in-the-Ring" Squadron), in his memoirs described Roosevelt's character as a soldier and pilot in the following words:

As President Roosevelt's son, he had rather a difficult task to fit himself in with the democratic style of living which is necessary in the intimate life of an aviation camp. Every one who met him for the first time expected him to have the airs and superciliousness of a spoiled boy. This notion was quickly lost after the first glimpse one had of Quentin. Gay, hearty and absolutely square in everything he said or did, Quentin Roosevelt was one of the most popular fellows in the group. We loved him purely for his own natural self.

He was reckless to such a degree that his commanding officers had to caution him repeatedly about the senselessness of his lack of caution. His bravery was so notorious that we all knew he would either achieve some great spectacular success or be killed in the attempt. Even the pilots in his own flight would beg him to conserve himself and wait for a fair opportunity for a victory. But Quentin would merely laugh away all serious advice.

Quentin's plane (a Nieuport 28) was shot down in aerial combat over Chamery, a hamlet of Coulonges-en-Tardenois (now Coulonges-Cohan). He was killed by two machine gun bullets which struck him in the head. The German military buried him with full battlefield honors. Since the plane had crashed so near the front lines, they used two pieces of basswood saplings, bound together with wire from his Nieuport, to fashion a cross for his grave. For propaganda purposes, they made a postcard of the dead pilot and his plane. However, this was met with shock in Germany, which still held Theodore Roosevelt in high respect and was impressed that a former president's son died on active duty. According to his service record, the site was at Marne Grave #1 Isolated Commune #102, Coulongue Aisne. The French government posthumously awarded him the Croix de Guerre with Palm.

=== Final combat flight and death ===
Three German pilots have been credited with Quentin Roosevelt's shootdown at various times, and all three may have taken part in the dogfight in which he was killed. The National Museum of the United States Air Force credits Leutnant Karl Thom of Jasta 21, one of the leading German flying aces of the war. Leutnant Christian Donhauser of Jasta 17 publicly claimed to have shot down and killed Roosevelt. Sergeant Carl Graeper is generally identified with the non-commissioned officer named Greper whom German wartime reports credited with the victory.

In 1921, Quentin's brother Kermit Roosevelt published Quentin Roosevelt: A Sketch with Letters, a collection of Quentin's correspondence and tributes written after his death. Pages 169–171 describe the circumstances of his final flight. One letter was written by American pilot Lieutenant Edward Buford, who had witnessed Roosevelt’s last mission and later described the events to his family.

Kermit also included an intercepted German communiqué of 14 July 1918 describing the engagement, which stated that Roosevelt had shown "conspicuous bravery" before being shot in the head. A later German bulletin further confirmed the death of "the son of former President of the United States." German reports credited a non-commissioned officer named Greper with the victory. The German press, including the Kölnische Zeitung, reported on the encounter, describing Roosevelt as having died "the death of a hero" and noting that he was buried with military honors by German aviators.

Funeral services for Roosevelt were witnessed on 15 July by Captain James E. Gee of the 110th Infantry, who was then a prisoner of war being moved through Chamery, near the crash site. Gee later recalled that about one thousand German soldiers stood in formation around the grave, and that officers explained the elaborate ceremony was conducted both to honor Roosevelt’s bravery and out of respect for his father.

On 18 July 1918, during the Allied counter-offensive, Chamery was recaptured and Roosevelt’s grave was discovered. A wooden cross placed by the Germans bore the inscription:

Lieutenant Roosevelt
Buried by the Germans.

Broken propeller blades and the remains of his aircraft were placed near the grave. American engineers later marked the site with a cross inscribed:

Here rests on the field of honor
Quentin Roosevelt
Air Service U.S.A.
Killed in action July 1918.

The French also placed an oaken enclosure with an inscription:

Lieutenant
Quentin Roosevelt
Escadrille 95
Tombé glorieusement
En combat aérien
Le 14 Juillet 1918
Pour le droit
Et la liberté

English translation: Lieutenant Quentin Roosevelt, Squadron 95, fallen gloriously in aerial combat, 14 July 1918, for right and liberty.

After Allied forces regained control of the area, Roosevelt’s grave became a place of pilgrimage for American soldiers. His death was deeply felt by his father, Theodore Roosevelt, who had strongly supported his son's decision to join the war. Theodore himself died less than six months later.

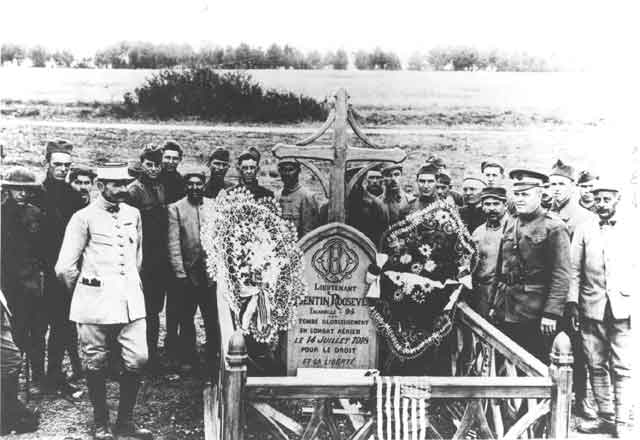
Allies visiting Quentin Roosevelt's grave in France during World War I

In 1955, eleven years after the establishment of the World War II American Cemetery at Colleville-sur-Mer, Roosevelt's remains were reinterred there beside his eldest brother, Theodore Roosevelt Jr., who had died in 1944 after leading troops during the Normandy landings and was posthumously awarded the Medal of Honor. Quentin’s original gravestone was moved to Sagamore Hill as a cenotaph, while the German-made wooden cross that had marked his original grave is preserved at the National Museum of the United States Air Force at Wright-Patterson Air Force Base, Dayton, Ohio.

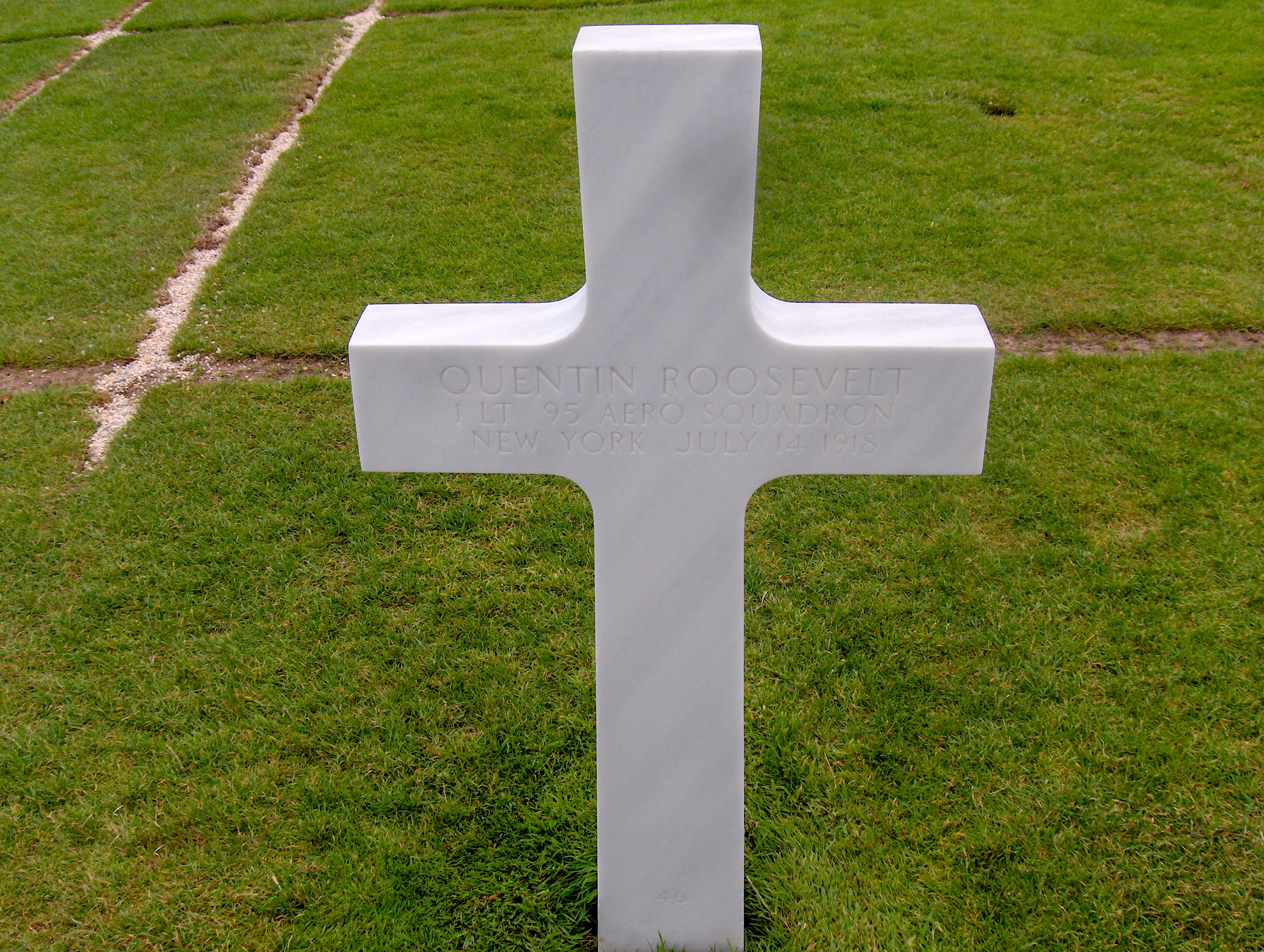
Quentin Roosevelt's headstone in the Normandy American Cemetery

== Commemorations ==
In 1919, former First Lady Edith Roosevelt placed a memorial fountain in Quentin's honor at Chamery, the village near where he was shot down. In June 2007, several Roosevelt family members and members of the Theodore Roosevelt Association traveled to France to rededicate the refurbished fountain.

The public primary school in Coulonges-Cohan, the commune where his plane crashed, is named the École Quentin Roosevelt.

Quentin Roosevelt II (1919–1948), the third and youngest son of Theodore Roosevelt Jr., was named after Quentin, and also died in a plane crash.

At the "Aux Morts des Armées de Champagne" monument and Navarin ossuary near Sainte-Marie-à-Py, one of the three soldier figures in Maxime Real del Sarte's sculptural group (unveiled 1924) is a portrait of Quentin Roosevelt.

The French village of Sancy-les-Cheminots in Aisne, destroyed during the war and rebuilt largely through donations from French railway workers (cheminots), remembers Quentin Roosevelt with a stele in its Jardin du Souvenir (Garden of Remembrance).

The community of Quentin, Pennsylvania, in Lebanon County, formerly named Bismarck, was renamed for Quentin Roosevelt after his death.

The airfield at Garden City, New York, formerly Hazelhurst Field and now the site of the Roosevelt Field shopping mall, was renamed in Quentin Roosevelt's honor in 1918. A Quentin Roosevelt Boulevard adjoins the site.

Naval Air Station North Island in San Diego, California, has a Quentin Roosevelt Boulevard.

A French Navy aviso, built at the Arsenal de Rochefort as Flamant and renamed Quentin Roosevelt after his death in 1918, was seized by the Royal Navy in July 1940 and served as an anti-submarine training ship before being returned to France in 1945.

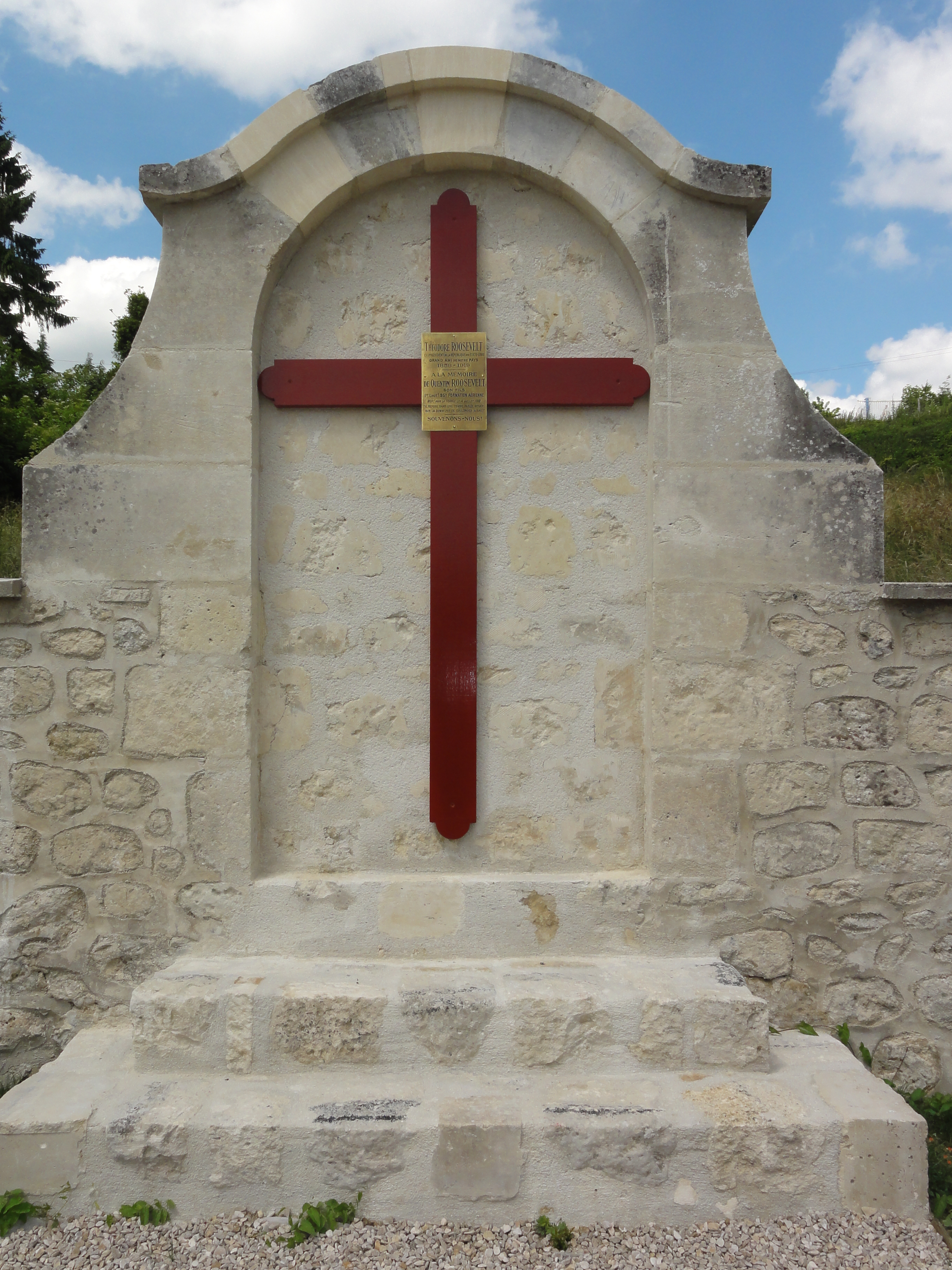
The remembrance cross for Quentin Roosevelt in Sancy-les-Cheminots.

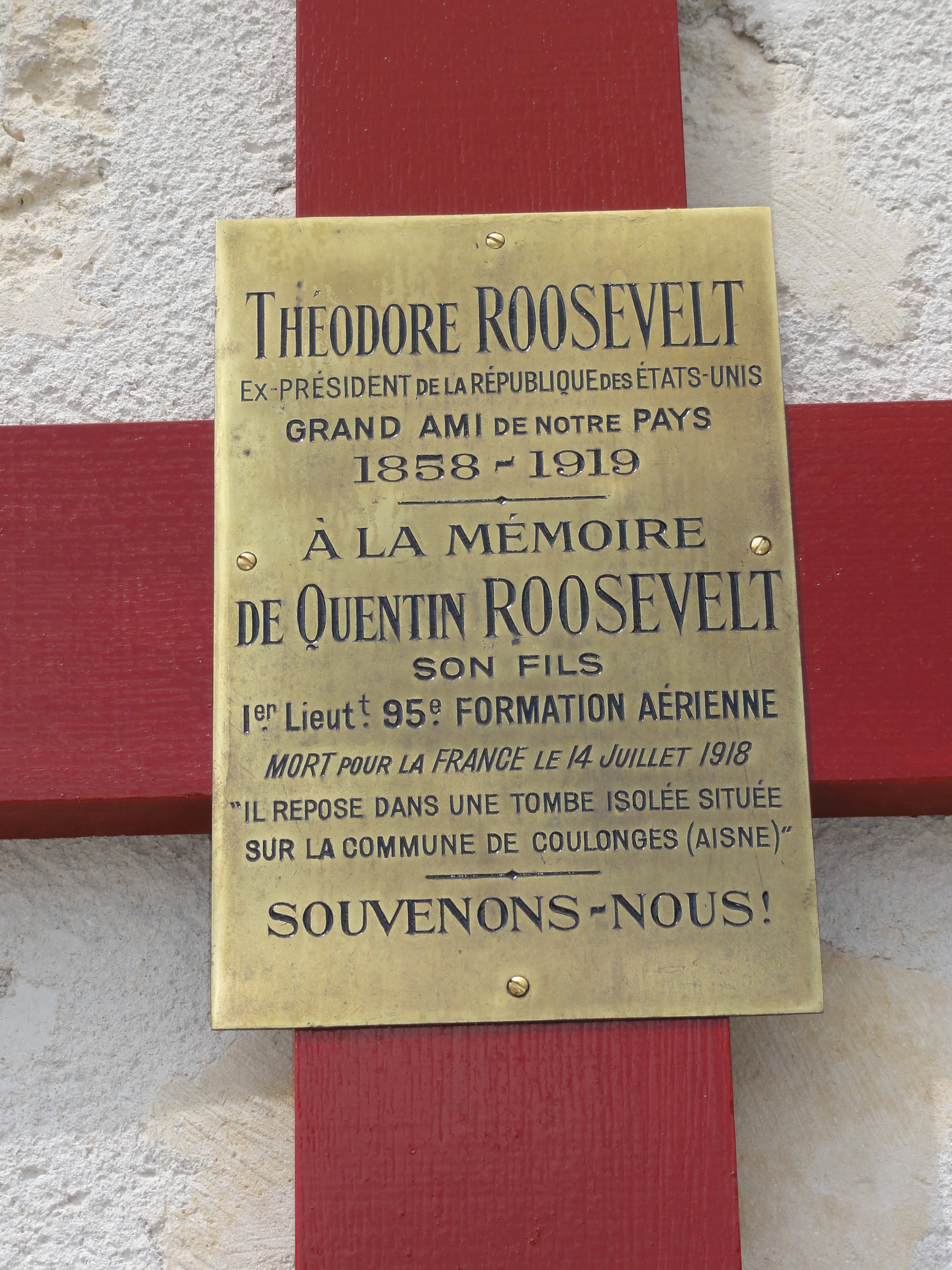
The plaque on the cross for Quentin Roosevelt in Sancy-les-Cheminots.

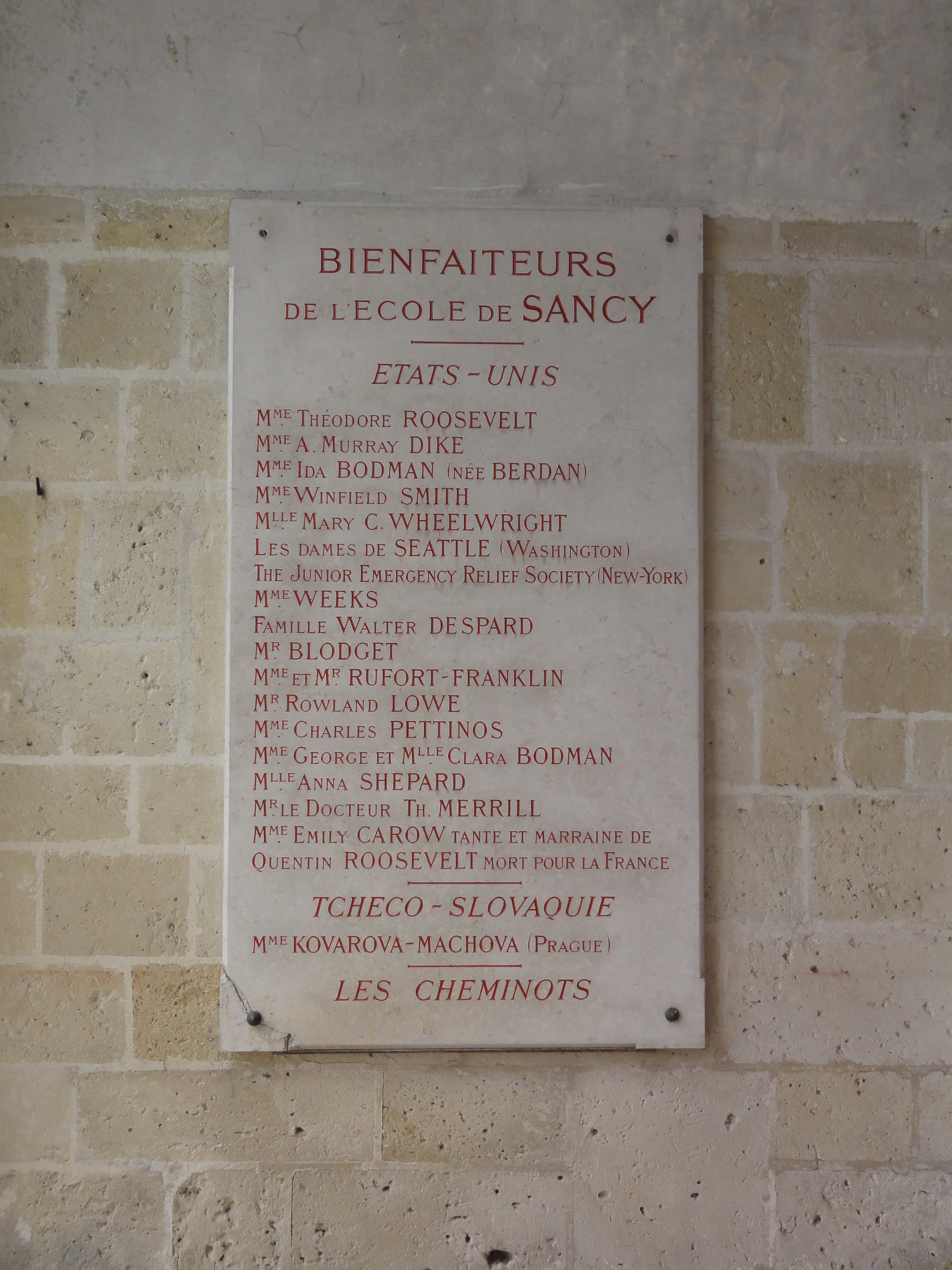
One of the plaques listing donors in Sancy-les-Cheminots.

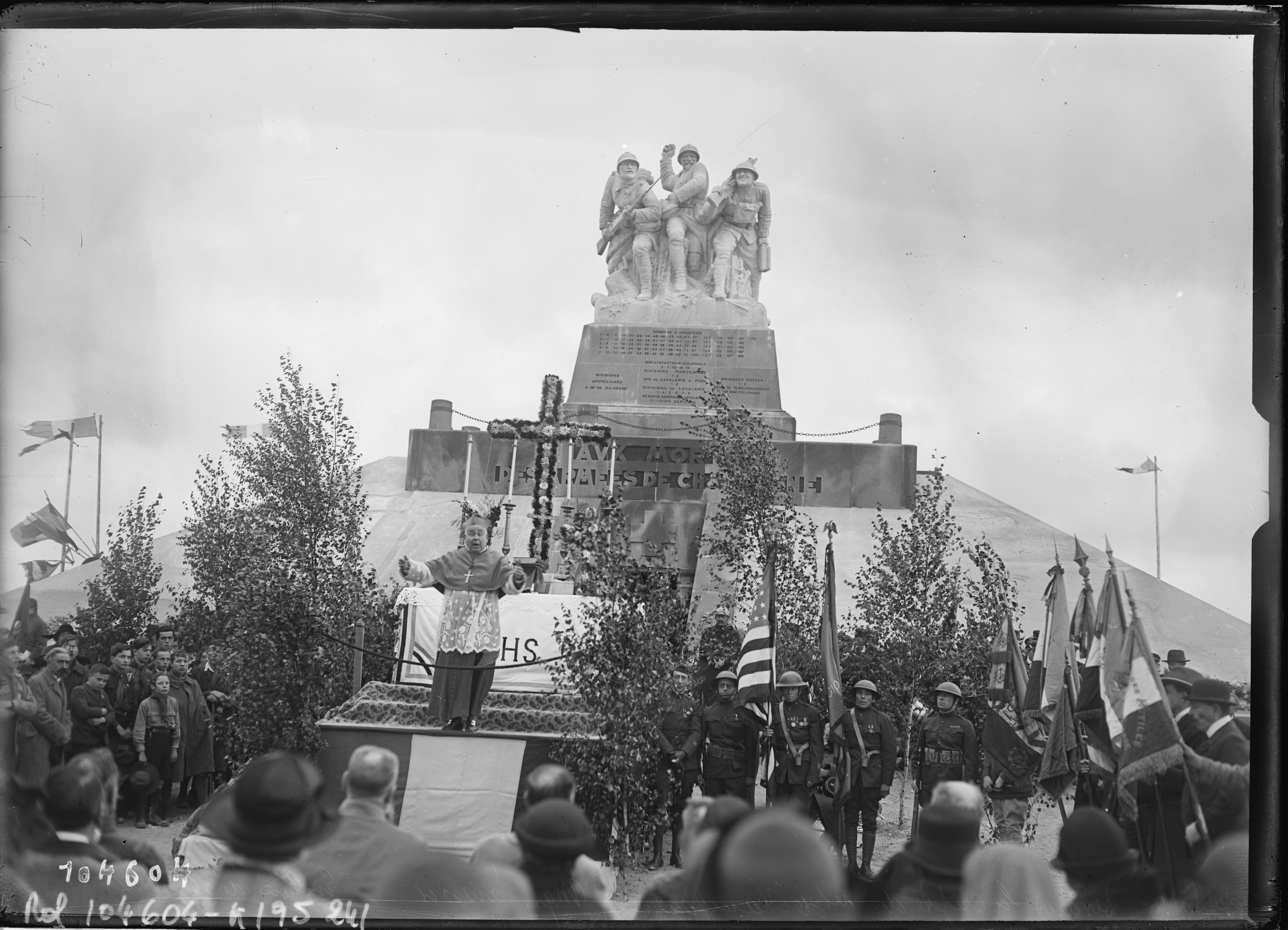
The Aux Morts des Armées de Champagne monument.

== See also ==
- Roosevelt family
- Louis-Napoléon, Prince Imperial
- Yakov Dzhugashvili
- Mao Anying
- Joseph P. Kennedy Jr.

== Literature ==
- Eric Burns: The golden Lad; the haunting Story of Quentin and Theodore Roosevelt. Pegasus Books, New York, 2016, ISBN 978-1-60598-951-8
