= Normandy American Cemetery and Memorial =

Military cemetery in Normandy

- American Battle Monuments Commission
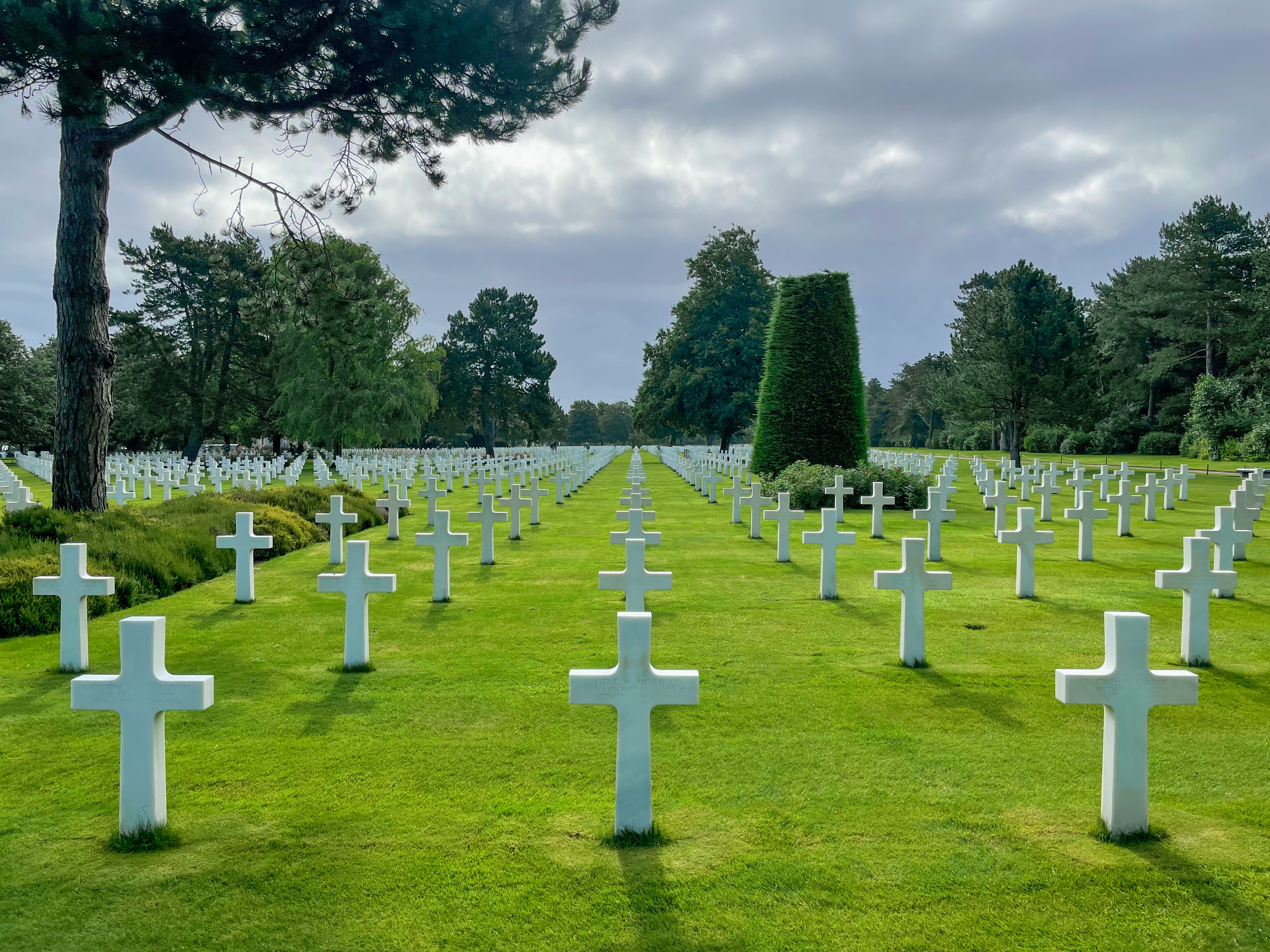
- For Operation Overlord
- Unveiled: July 19, 1956
- Location: 49.3600°N 0.8575°W near Colleville-sur-Mer, Normandy, France
- Designed by: Harbeson, Hough, Livingston & Larson; Markley Stevenson (landscaping); Donald De Lue (sculptor); Leon Kroll (murals); Robert Foster (maps)
- Total burials: 9,389
- Unknowns: 307
- Commemorated: 1,557

Burials by nation
- * United States: 9,389

Burials by war
- * World War II: 9,389: World War I: Quentin Roosevelt (reburied here in 1955)

The Normandy American Cemetery and Memorial (French: Cimetière américain de Colleville-sur-Mer) is a World War II cemetery and memorial in Colleville-sur-Mer, Normandy, France, that honors American troops who died in the Normandy landings and the Battle of Normandy that followed. It is located adjacent to the site of the former temporary battlefield cemetery of Saint Laurent, covers 172.5 acres (69.8 ha) and contains 9,389 gravesites.

A memorial in the cemetery includes maps and details of the Normandy landings and military operations that followed. At the memorial's center is Spirit of American Youth Rising from the Waves, a bronze statue by Donald De Lue. The cemetery also includes two flag poles where, at different times, people gather to watch the American flags being lowered and folded.

The cemetery, which was dedicated in 1956, is the most visited cemetery of those maintained by the American Battle Monuments Commission (ABMC), with one million visitors a year. In 2007, the ABMC opened a visitor center at the cemetery, relating the global significance and meaning of Operation Overlord. The number of visitors to the cemetery is such that during 2026, a reservation system will be introduced to avoid situations where visitors are refused entry due to overcrowding, as has happened under the existing system.

== History ==
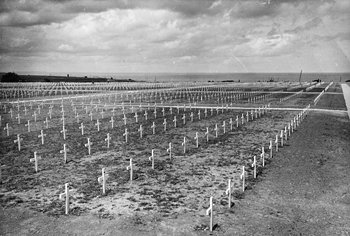
The cemetery one year after D-Day

On June 6, 1944, the 607th Quartermaster Graves Registration Company of the U.S. First Army established a temporary cemetery, the first American cemetery on French soil in World War II. After the war, on June 8, 1944, the present-day cemetery was established a short distance to the east of the original site. At this point, relatives of those buried in the temporary cemetery could choose repatriation of the remains for burial in the USA. If burial in France was chosen, reburial took place in the geometric rows seen today. The remains of British servicemen who had died on Omaha Beach were disinterred from the temporary cemetery in late 1944 for reburial in the Bayeux war cemetery.

It was dedicated on July 19, 1956, in the presence of Admiral Thomas C. Kinkaid of the U.S. Navy, representing President Dwight D. Eisenhower, and French General Jean Ganeval, representing President René Coty.

Like all other overseas American cemeteries in France for World War I and II, the French Government has granted the United States a special concession to the land occupied by the cemetery, for an unlimited duration, free of any charge or any tax, as long as the United States maintains the cemetery. It does not benefit from extraterritoriality and remains the property of the French State. This cemetery is managed by the American Battle Monuments Commission, a small independent agency of the U.S. federal government, under Congressional acts that provide yearly financial support for maintaining them, with most military and civil personnel employed abroad. The U.S. flag flies over these granted soils.

== Description ==
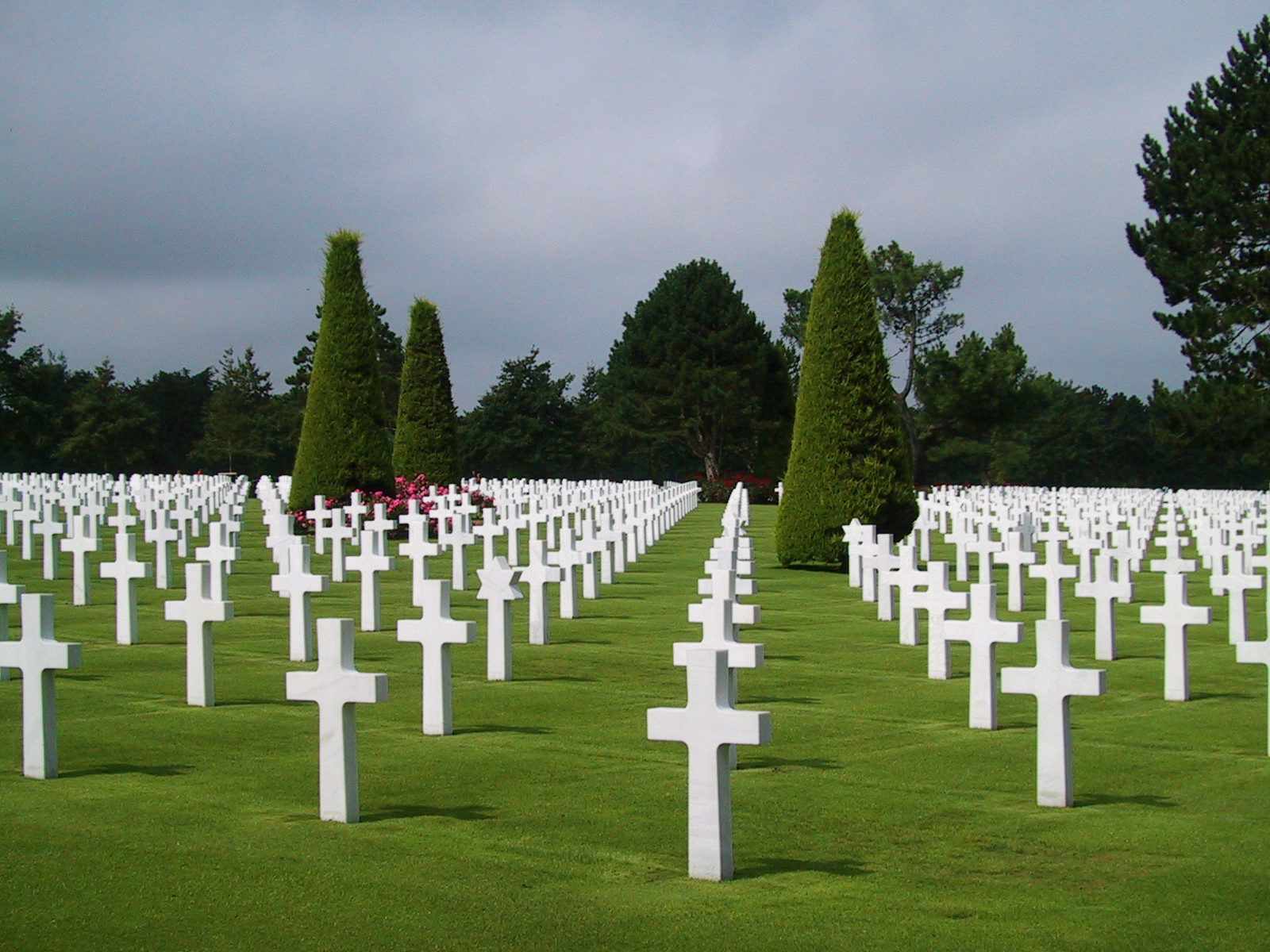
Grave markers at the cemetery

The cemetery is located on a bluff overlooking Omaha Beach (one of the landing beaches of the Normandy Invasion) and the English Channel. It covers 172.5 acres, and contains the remains of 9,389 American military dead, most of whom were killed during the invasion of Normandy and ensuing military operations in World War II. Included are graves of Army Air Corps crews shot down over France as early as 1942 and four American women.

Only some of the soldiers who died overseas are buried in the overseas American military cemeteries. When it came time for a permanent burial, the next of kin eligible to make decisions were asked if they wanted their loved ones repatriated for permanent burial in the United States or interred at the closest overseas cemetery.

== Burials ==
=== Number of burials ===
On June 19, 2018, Julius H. O. Pieper was laid to rest next to his twin brother, Ludwig J. W. Pieper, and became the 9,388th servicemember buried at the Normandy American Cemetery.

These burials are marked by white Lasa marble headstones, 9,238 of which are Latin crosses (for Protestants and Catholics) and 151 of which are stars of David (for Jews). Since these were the only three religions recognized at the time by the United States Army, no other type of markers are present.

The cemetery contains the graves of 45 pairs of brothers (30 of whom are buried side by side), a father and his son, an uncle and his nephew, 2 pairs of cousins, 3 generals, 4 chaplains, 4 civilians, 4 women, 147 African Americans and 20 Native Americans.

Three hundred four unknown soldiers are buried among the other service members. Their headstones read "HERE RESTS IN HONORED GLORY A COMRADE IN ARMS KNOWN BUT TO GOD".

East of the Memorial lies the Wall of the Missing, where are inscribed the names of 1,557 servicemembers declared missing in action during Operation Overlord. Nineteen of these names bear a bronze rosette, meaning that their body has been found and identified since the cemetery's dedication.

=== Notable interments ===
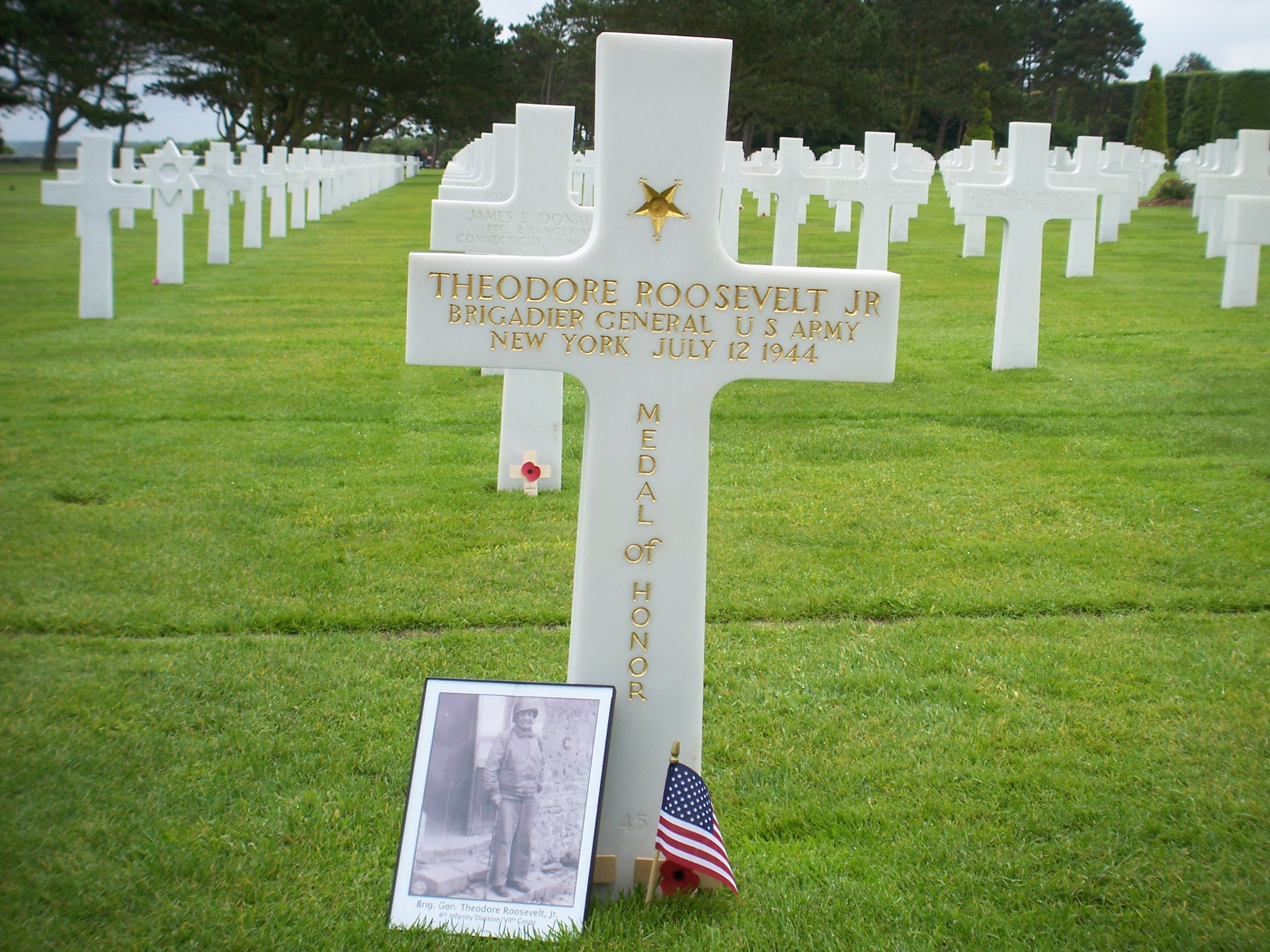
Headstone of Theodore Roosevelt Jr.

Among the burials at the cemetery are three recipients of the Medal of Honor, including Theodore Roosevelt Jr., son of President Theodore Roosevelt. After the creation of the cemetery, another son of President Roosevelt, Quentin, who had been killed in World War I, was exhumed and reburied next to his brother.

Notable burials at the cemetery include:

- Lesley J. McNair, U.S. Army general, one of the two highest-ranking Americans to be killed in action in World War II
- Two of the Niland brothers, Preston and Robert, whose story inspired Steven Spielberg's Saving Private Ryan
- Jimmie W. Monteith, Medal of Honor recipient
- Frank D. Peregory, Medal of Honor recipient
- Quentin Roosevelt, son of President Theodore Roosevelt, aviator killed in action in World War I and reburied next to the grave of his brother, Theodore Roosevelt Jr.
- Theodore Roosevelt Jr., son of President Theodore Roosevelt, Medal of Honor recipient

== Layout ==
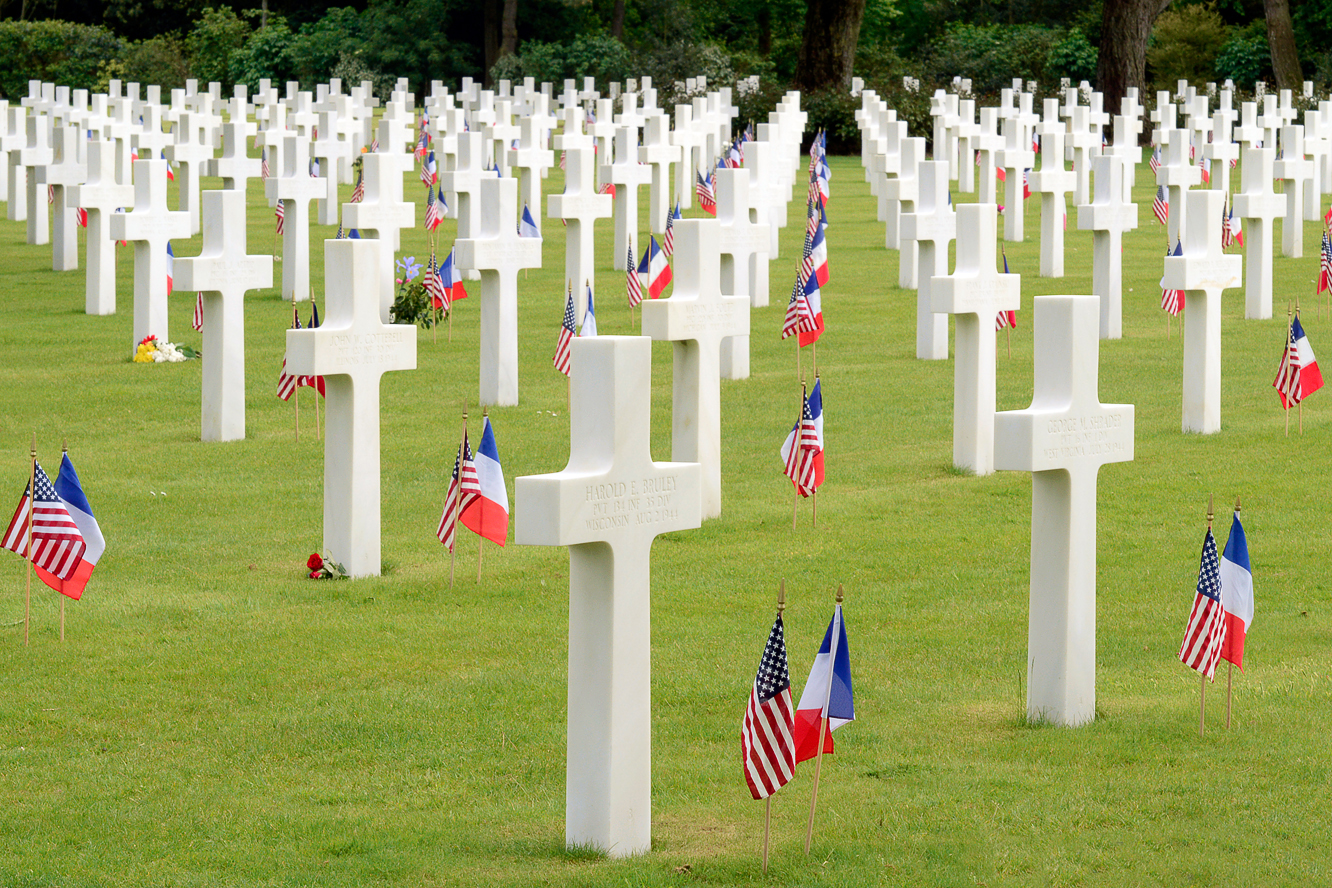
Crosses at the Cemetery after an Anniversary commemoration

The Cemetery is divided into ten plots. It forms a Latin cross, with the Chapel in its middle, and the Memorial and Wall of the Missing at its base.

It faces the United States, in the direction of a point between Eastport and Lubec, Maine. This is coincidental, as the Cemetery was built parallel to the beach on the lands granted by the French.

=== Memorial ===
The Memorial consists of a semicircular colonnade with a loggia at each end containing maps and narratives of the military operations. It is built in medium-hard limestone from upper Burgundy. Two of the maps, designed by Robert Foster, are 32 feet long and 20 feet high.

At the center is a 22-foot bronze statue entitled The Spirit of American Youth Rising from the Waves by Donald De Lue.

Over the arches of the Memorial is engraved "THIS EMBATTLED SHORE, PORTAL OF FREEDOM, IS FOREVER HALLOWED BY THE IDEALS, THE VALOR AND THE SACRIFICES OF OUR FELLOW COUNTRYMEN".

At the feet of the Memorial is engraved both in English and French "IN PROUD REMEMBRANCE OF THE ACHIEVEMENTS OF HER SONS AND IN HUMBLE TRIBUTE TO THEIR SACRIFICES THIS MEMORIAL HAS BEEN ERECTED BY THE UNITED STATES OF AMERICA".

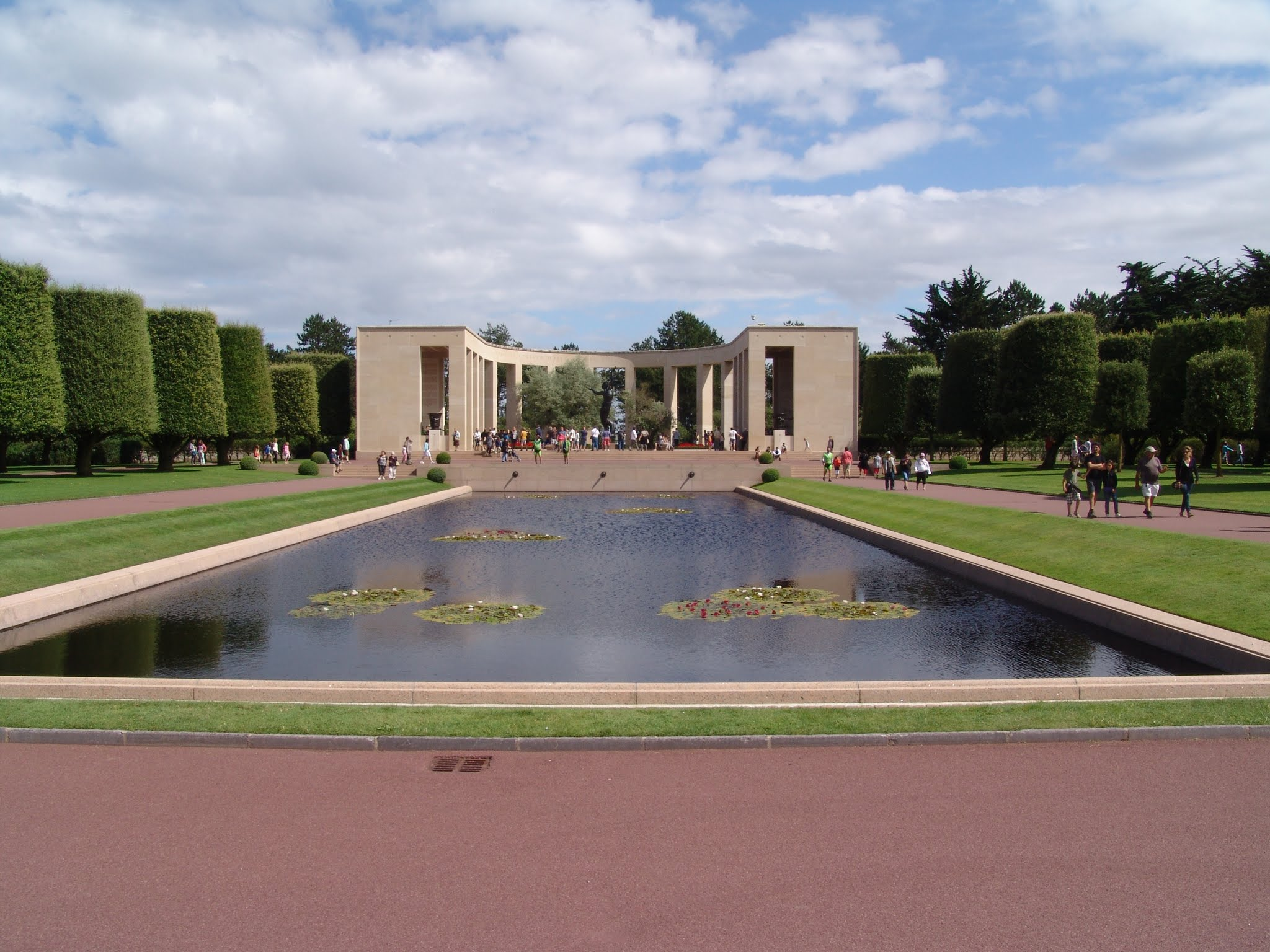
The Memorial from the other side of the reflecting pool

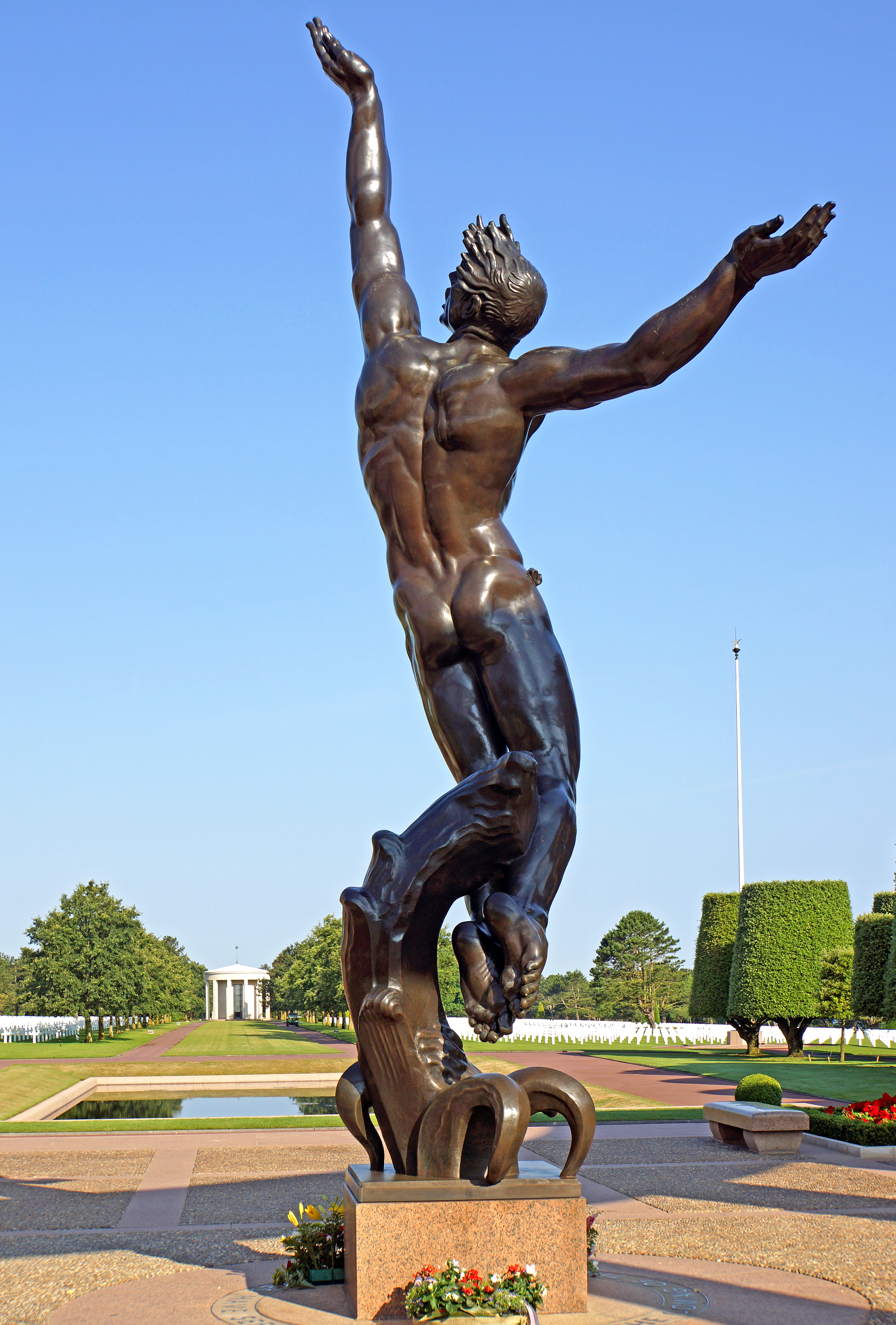
Spirit of American Youth Rising from the Waves by Donald De Lue

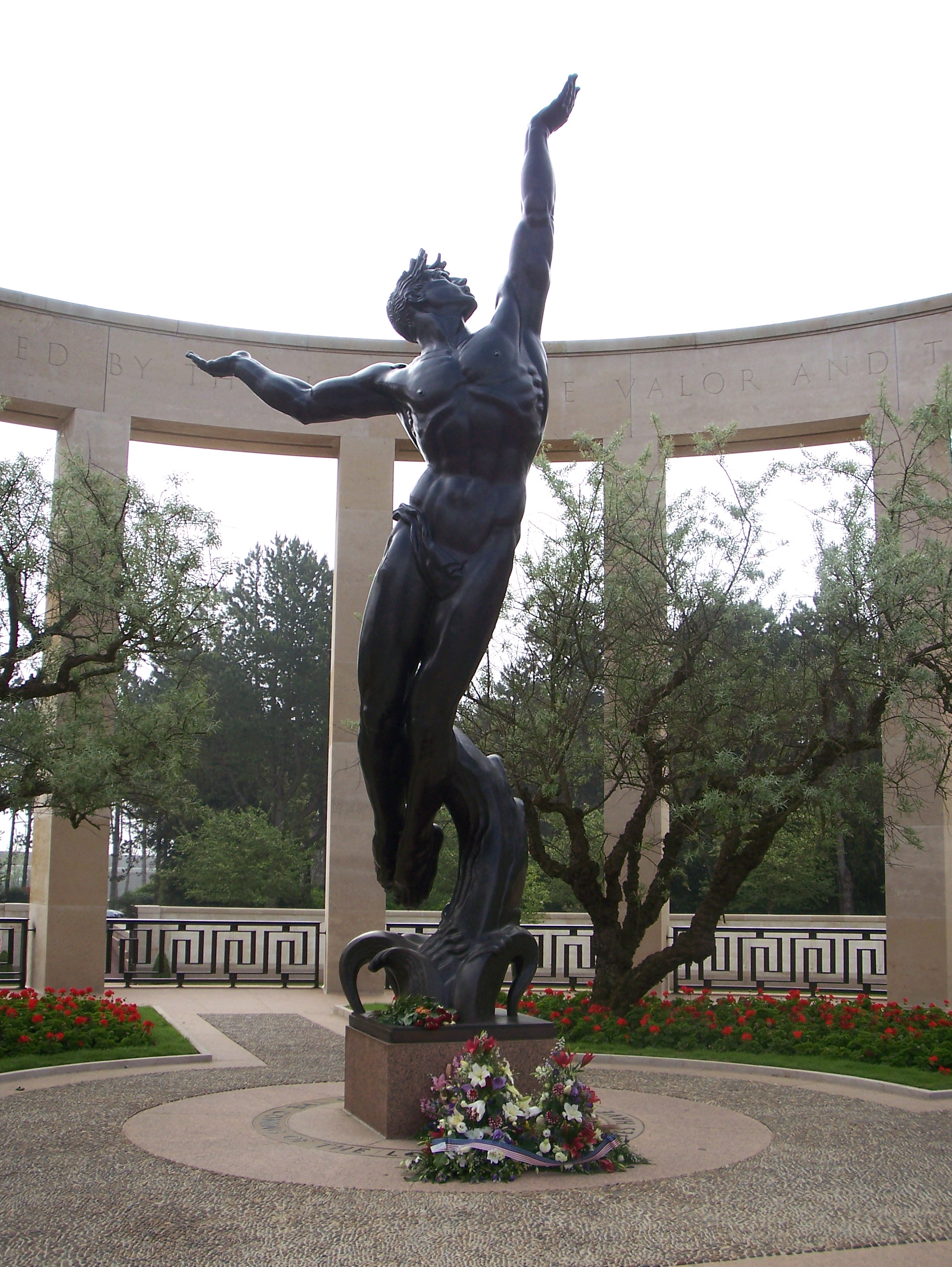
Spirit of American Youth Rising from the Waves

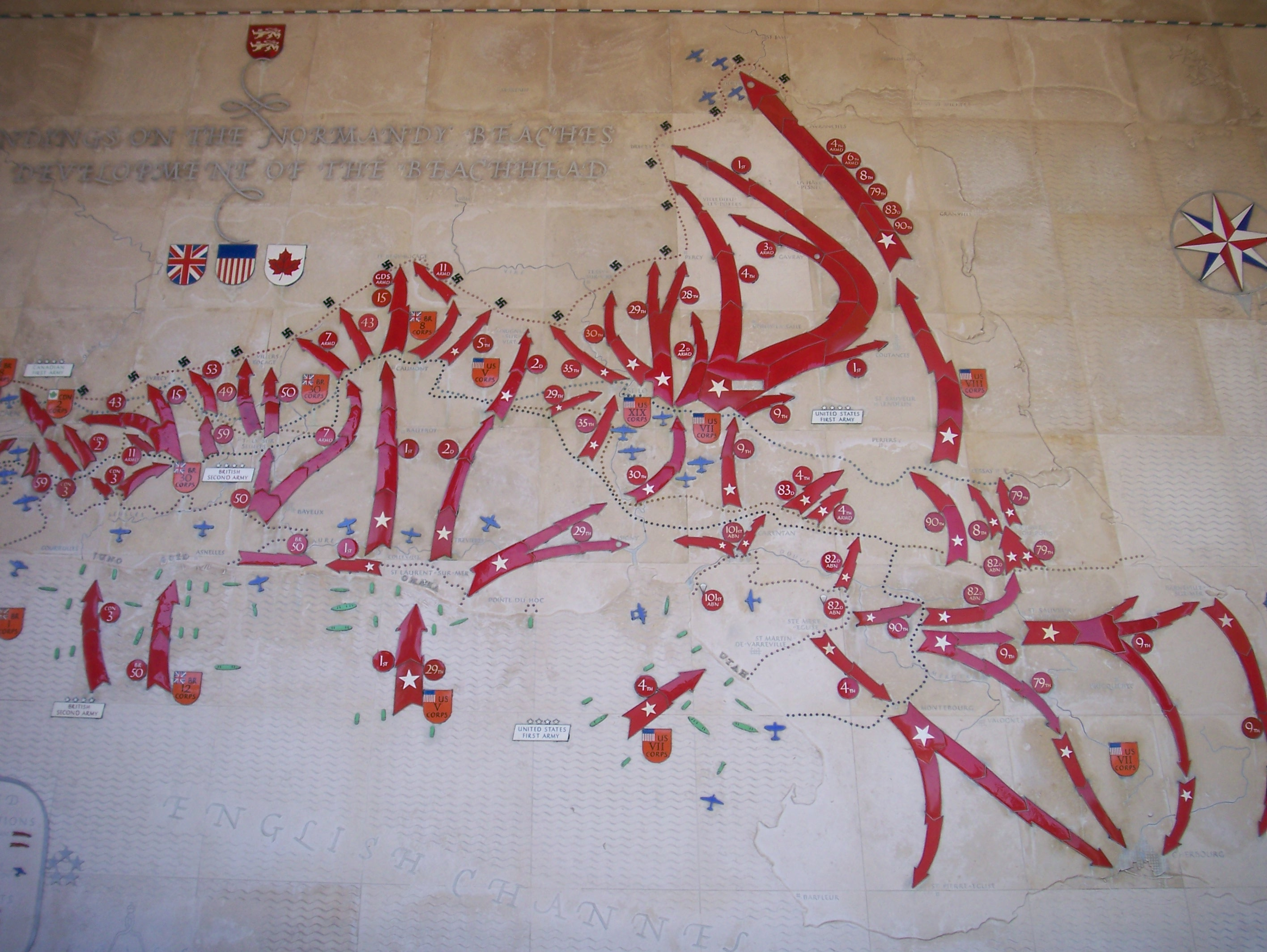
Map of the landings on the Normandy beaches

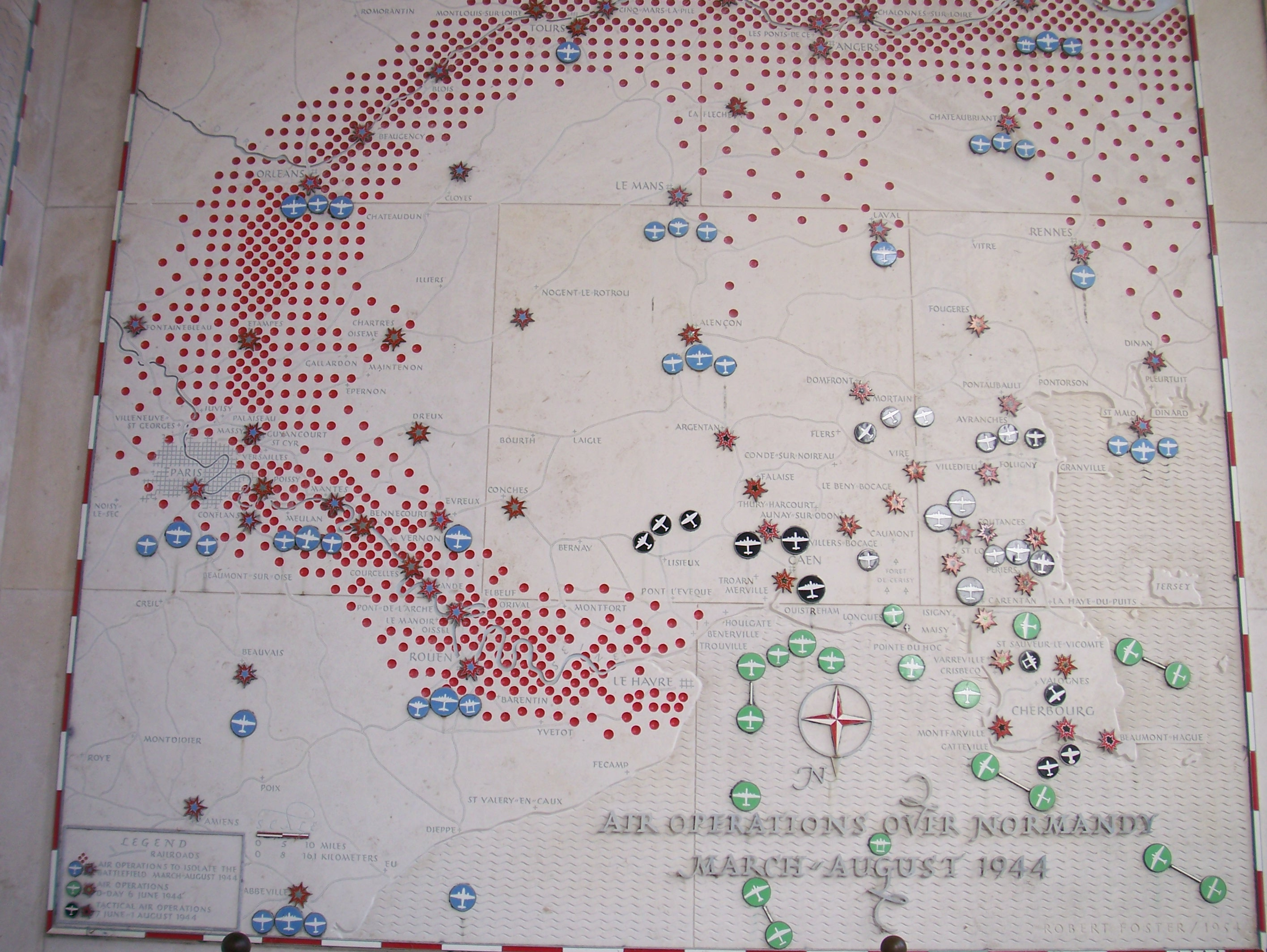
Map of the air operations over Normandy

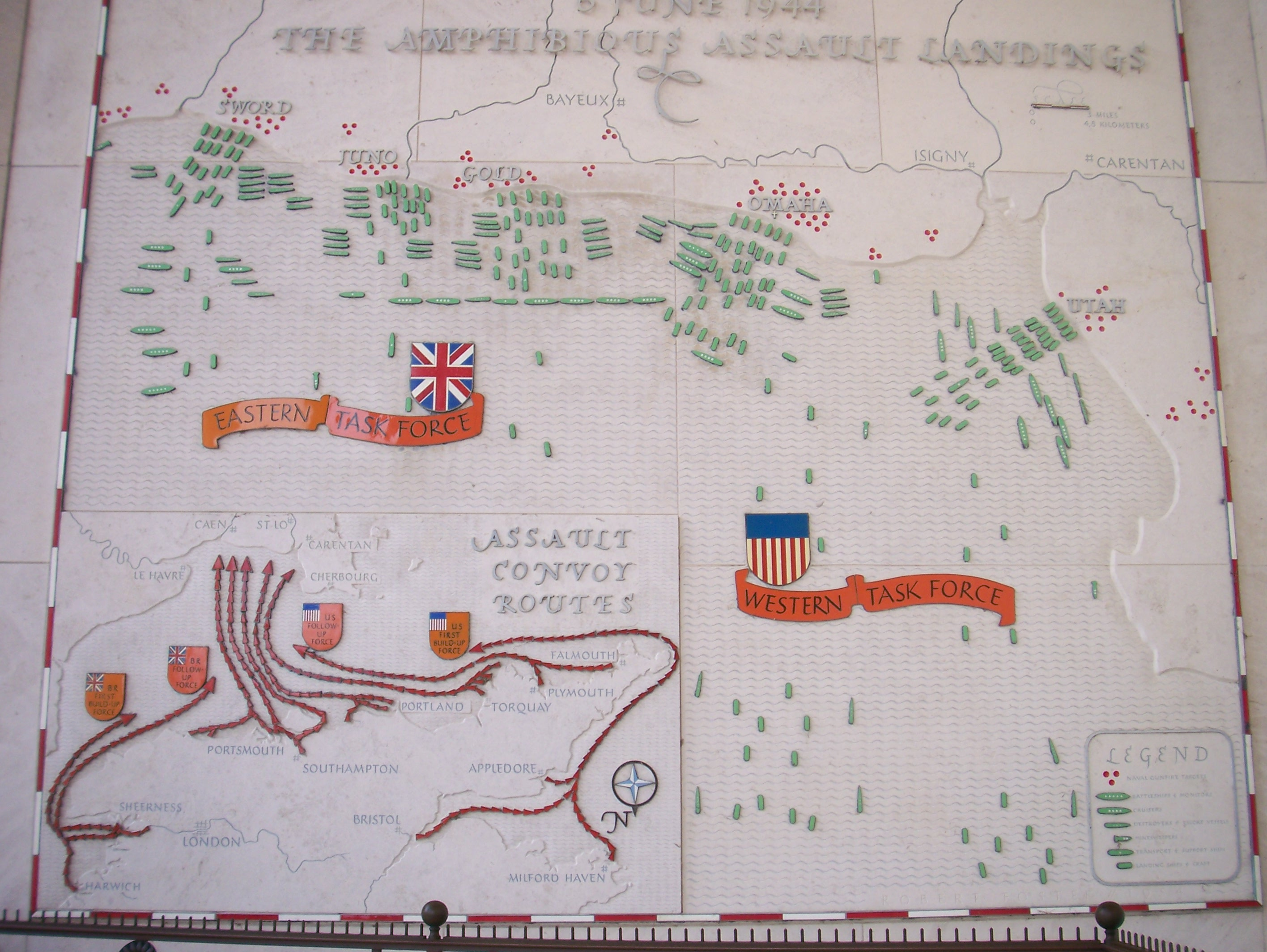
Map of the amphibious assault landings

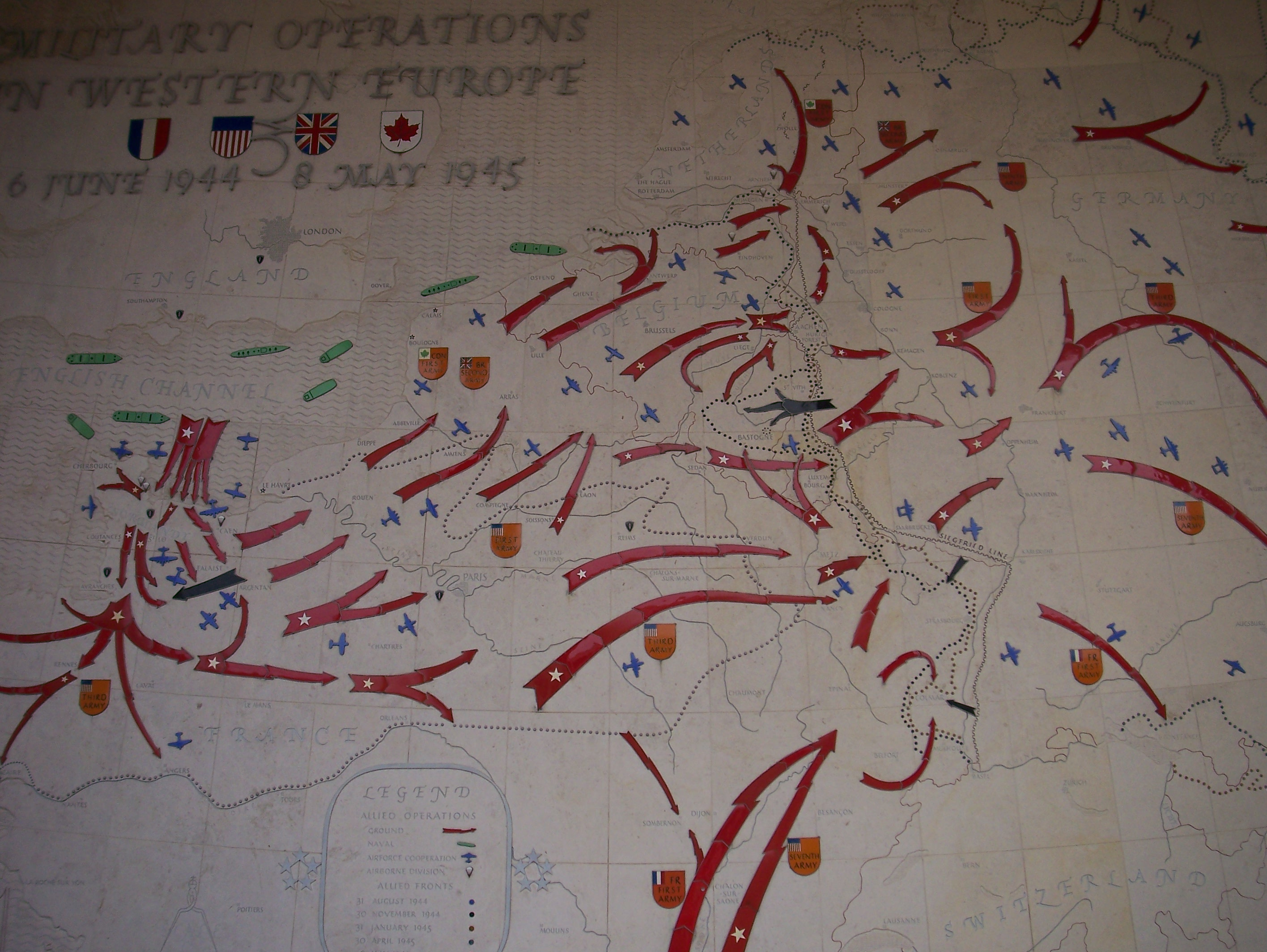
Map of the military operations in Western Europe

=== Wall of the Missing ===
The semi-circular gardens bear the 1,557 engraved names of service members declared missing in action in Normandy. Most of them were lost at sea, including over 489 in the sinking of the SS Léopoldville.

Nineteen of these names bear a bronze rosette next to their name, meaning that their body was recovered and identified after the cemetery's dedication.

Above the walls is engraved, both in English and French,

★ COMRADES IN ARMS WHOSE RESTING PLACE IS KNOWN ONLY TO GOD ★
★ HERE ARE RECORDED THE NAMES OF AMERICANS WHO GAVE THEIR LIVES IN THE SERVICE OF THEIR COUNTRY AND WHO SLEEP IN UNKNOWN GRAVES ★ THIS IS THEIR MEMORIAL ♦ THE WHOLE EARTH THEIR SEPULCHER ★

At its center is engraved "TO THESE WE OWE THE HIGH RESOLVE THAT THE CAUSE FOR WHICH THEY DIED SHALL LIVE", an abbreviation of General Dwight D. Eisenhower's dedication of the Golden Book in St Paul's Cathedral, London.

=== Chapel ===
At the center of the cemetery lies a multi-confessional chapel. Its altar, in black and gold Pyrenean marble, reads “I GIVE UNTO THEM ETERNAL LIFE AND THEY SHALL NEVER PERISH”. The stained glass behind it bears a Latin cross and present a star of David, as well as an alpha and an omega symbol, meant to represent all other religions.

On its ceiling lies a spectacular mosaic by Leon Kroll. Completed in 1953, it comprises 500,000 tiles and tells a full round story “of war and peace.” One side depicts Columbia (Goddess of Liberty) allegorically representing America blessing “her rifle-bearing son before he departs to fight overseas. Above him, a warship and a bomber push through sea and air toward land on the opposite side of the dome. There, a red-capped Marianne figure personifying France bestows a laurel wreath upon the same young man. His now lifeless body leans against her as she cradles his head in her lap. Above them, the return of peace is illustrated with an angel, a dove and a homeward-bound troop ship.” These two figures can be seen again as statues, guarding the end of the cemetery.

Outside is engraved on its wall, both in English and French

THIS CHAPEL HAS BEEN ERECTED BY THE UNITED STATES OF AMERICA IN GRATEFUL MEMORY OF HER SONS WHO GAVE THEIR LIVES IN THE LANDINGS ON THE NORMANDY BEACHES AND THE LIBERATION OF NORTHERN FRANCE ★ THEIR GRAVES ARE THE PERMANENT AND VISIBLE SYMBOL OF THEIR HEROIC DEVOTION AND THEIR SACRIFICE IN THE COMMON CAUSE OF HUMANITY

On its roof is engraved

THESE ENDURED ALL AND GAVE ALL THAT JUSTICE AMONG NATIONS MIGHT PREVAIL AND THAT MANKIND MIGHT ENJOY FREEDOM AND INHERIT PEACE

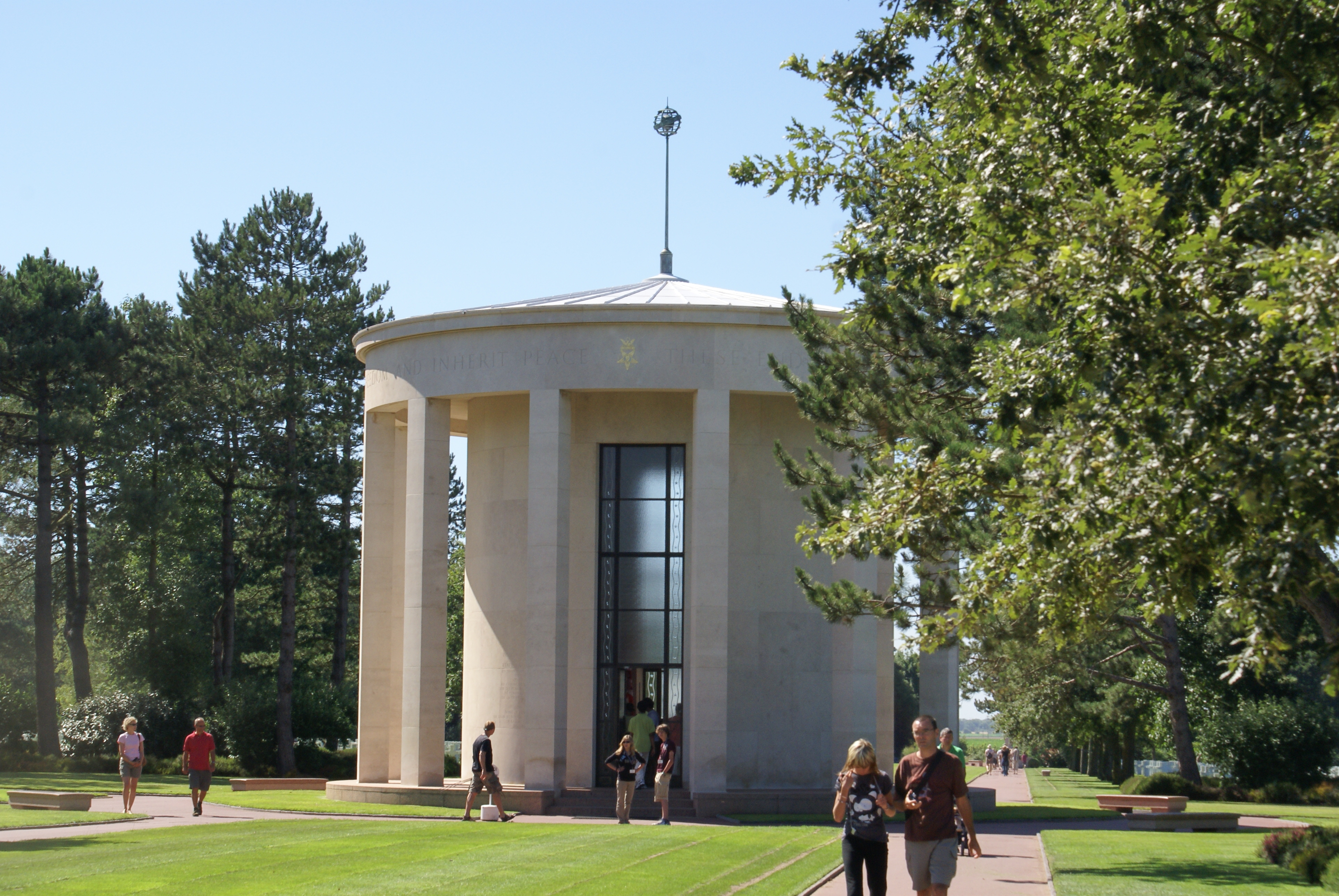
The Chapel at the cemetery

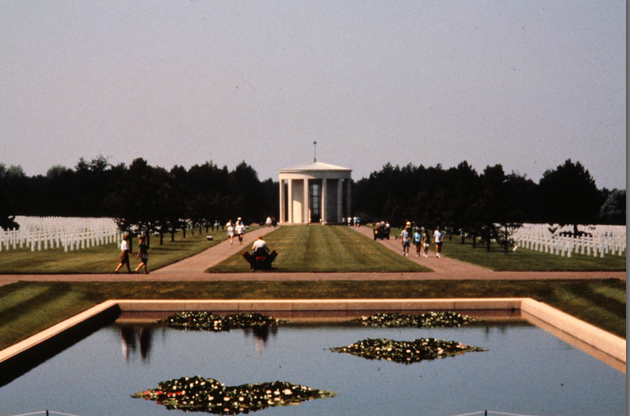
View from the memorial in 1989

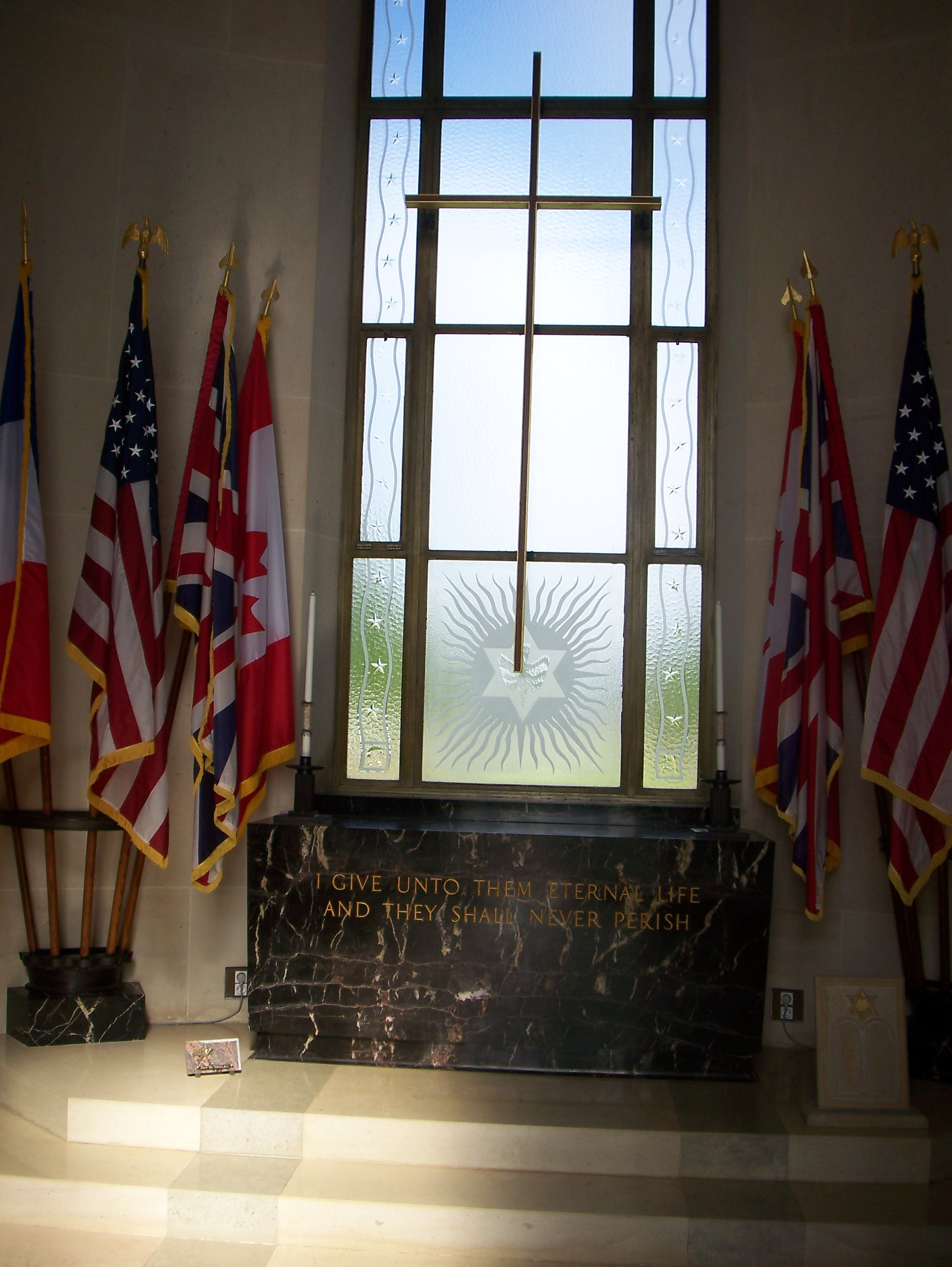
Altar inside the Chapel

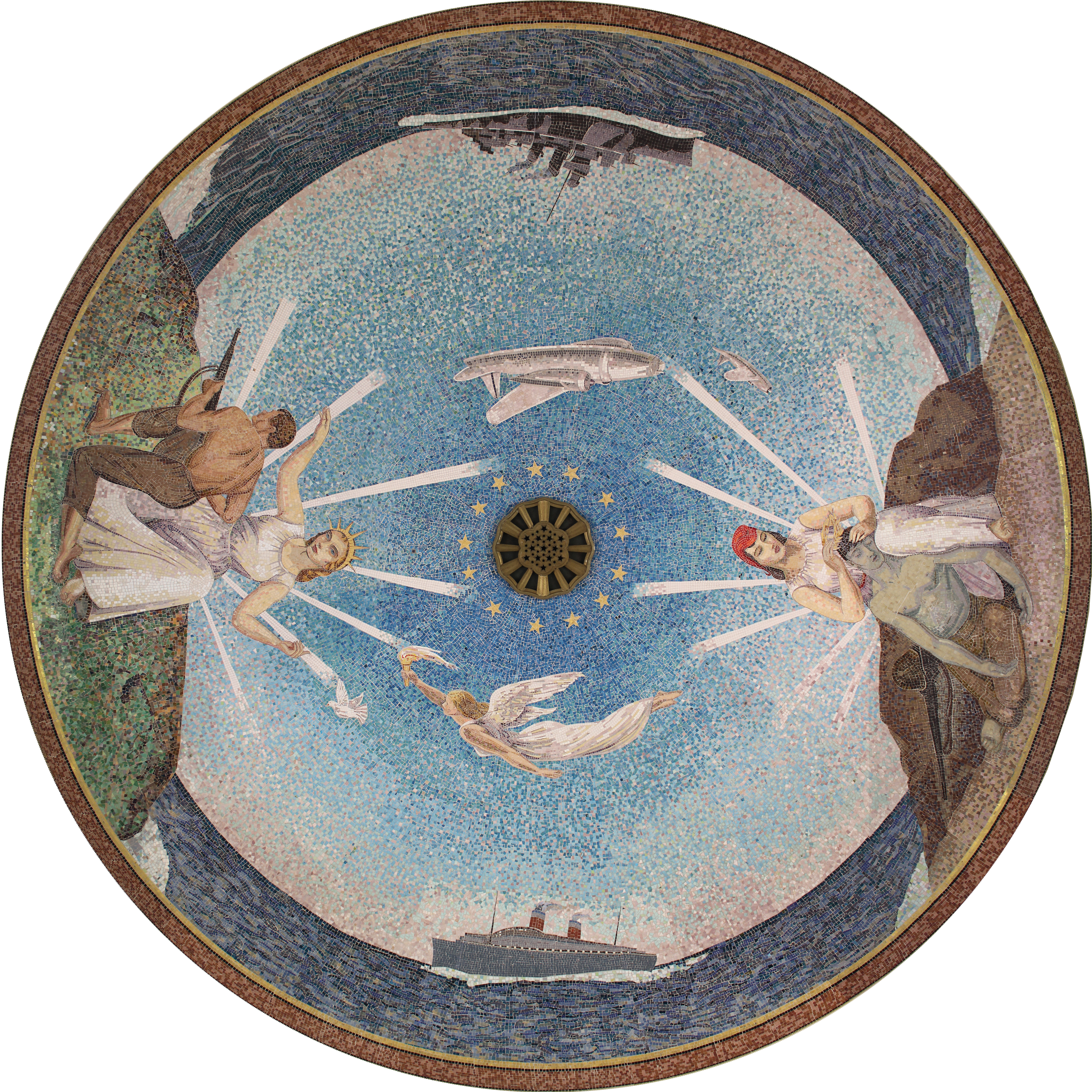
Ceiling of the Chapel

=== Orientation Table ===
An orientation table overlooks the beach and depicts the landings at Normandy. Designed by Robert Foster, it is of Swedish black granite.

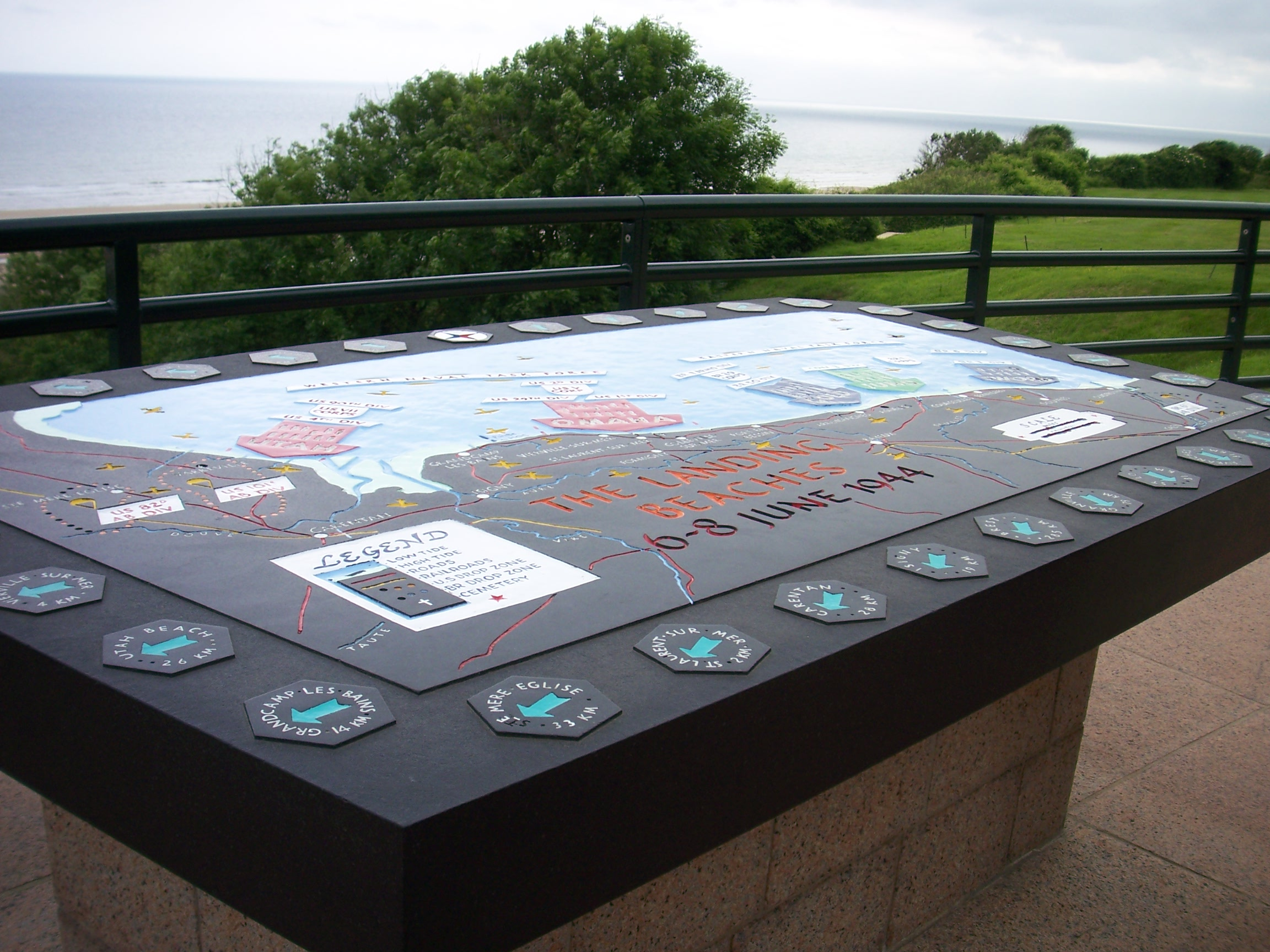
Orientation Table

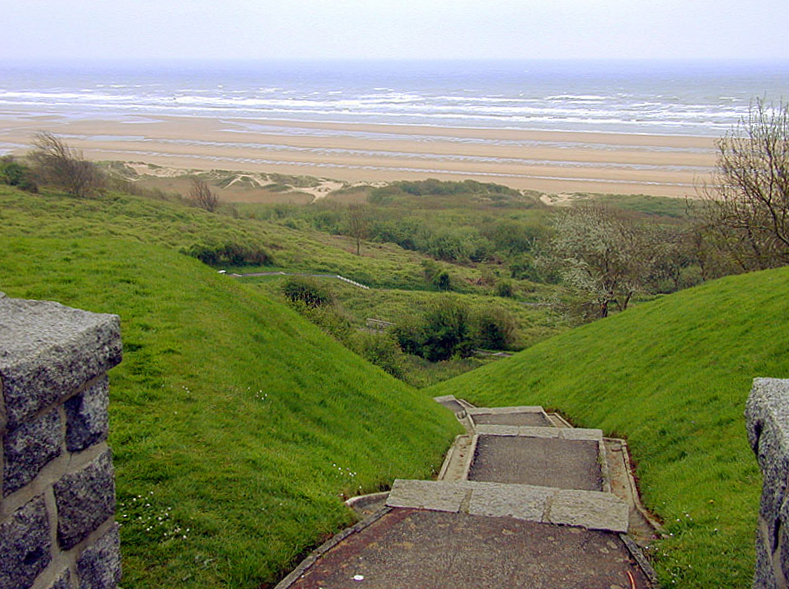
Now closed access to Omaha Beach from the cemetery

=== Time capsule ===
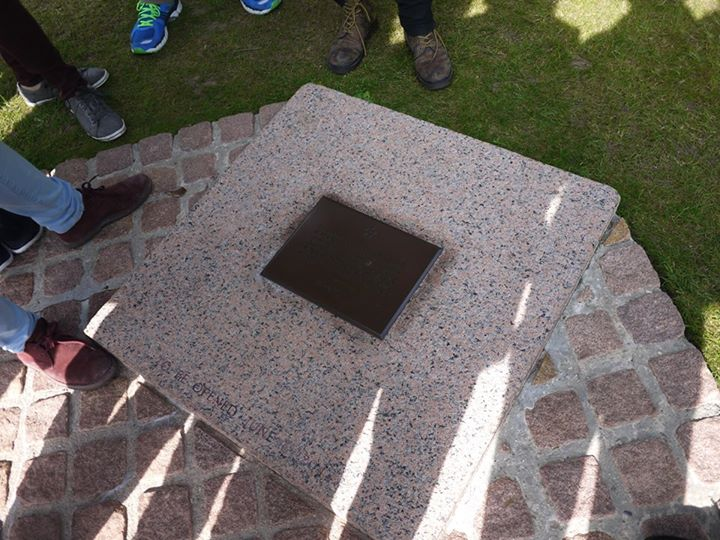
Time capsule

Embedded in the lawn directly opposite the entrance to the old Visitors' Building is a time capsule which has been sealed and contains news reports of the June 6, 1944, Normandy landings. The capsule is covered by a pink granite slab upon which is engraved: To be opened June 6, 2044. Affixed in the center of the slab is a bronze plaque adorned with the five stars of a General of the Army and engraved with the following inscription: "In memory of General Dwight D. Eisenhower and the forces under his command. This sealed capsule containing news reports of the June 6, 1944, Normandy landings is placed here by the newsmen who were there, June 6, 1969."

=== Landscaping ===
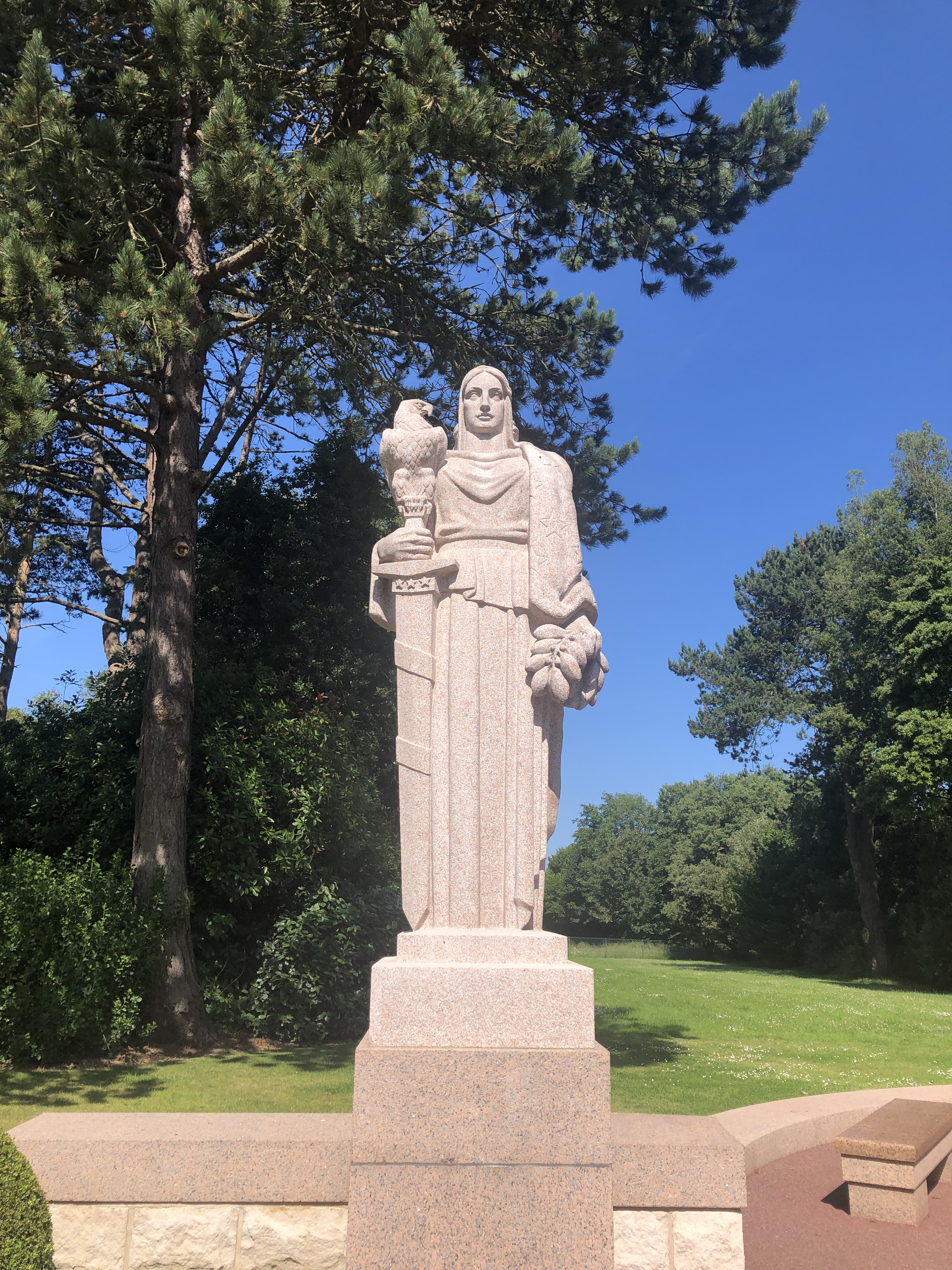
A statue of the personification of America at the far end of the cemetery.

The cemetery is planted with Austrian black pines, holly oaks, and Turkey oaks. Its undergrowth is composed of Austrian pines, alders, common oak trees, American red oak trees, holly oak trees, ash trees, sycamore trees, maple trees, and a few maritime pines and pine trees. It is decorated by polyantha roses, common heather and Erica heather.

== In popular culture ==
- In Saving Private Ryan (1998), the cemetery is featured at the beginning and end, showing World War II veteran Private James Francis Ryan accompanied by his family. In the beginning of the film, he makes his way to the grave of Captain John Miller (played by Tom Hanks). At the end, Ryan, who was instructed by Miller to earn the sacrifices made to send him home, says that he lived his life as best as he could and hopes that he has earned all that Miller and his men did for him. After asking for confirmation from his wife that he lived a good life and was a good man, Ryan salutes the grave (both the grave and Captain John Miller are fictional; the headstone for Miller was only brought to the cemetery for the movie). The Private Ryan story is based upon the story of the Niland brothers, two of whom are buried in the cemetery; references are also made to the five Sullivan brothers, who were all killed in the "Juneau incident".
- Symphonic Prelude (The Cemetery at Colleville-sur-Mer), by Mark Camphouse, portrays the battle in a way that battles are commonly depicted for bands: a slow introduction followed by a moderate tempo body and a majestic ending.
- The cemetery is featured on the album cover of the 1977 Scorpions album Taken by Force.

== See also ==
- List of military cemeteries in Normandy
