= Center for Tropical Forest Science =

Panamaian-based consortium

The Center for Tropical Forest Science, or CTFS, was a consortium of forest researchers who pursued long-term research on tree populations using comparable census method. The work developed out of a study of 50 hectares of forest on Barro Colorado Island in Panama begun in 1981. All individual trees larger than 1 centimeter in stem diameter were measured, mapped, and identified, which included 300 different species. This census has been repeated every five years since. Parallel censuses of large forest plots were carried out in Africa, Latin America, and Asia. Numerous scientific research reports on tree species diversity, distribution, life span, and growth rates have been published based on these plots. CTFS was directed out of the Smithsonian Tropical Research Institute in Panama City, Panama.

*NOTE: In 2013 the Center for Tropical Forest Science transitioned to ForestGEO, the Forest Global Earth Observatory.
