= Villebaudon =

- Commune
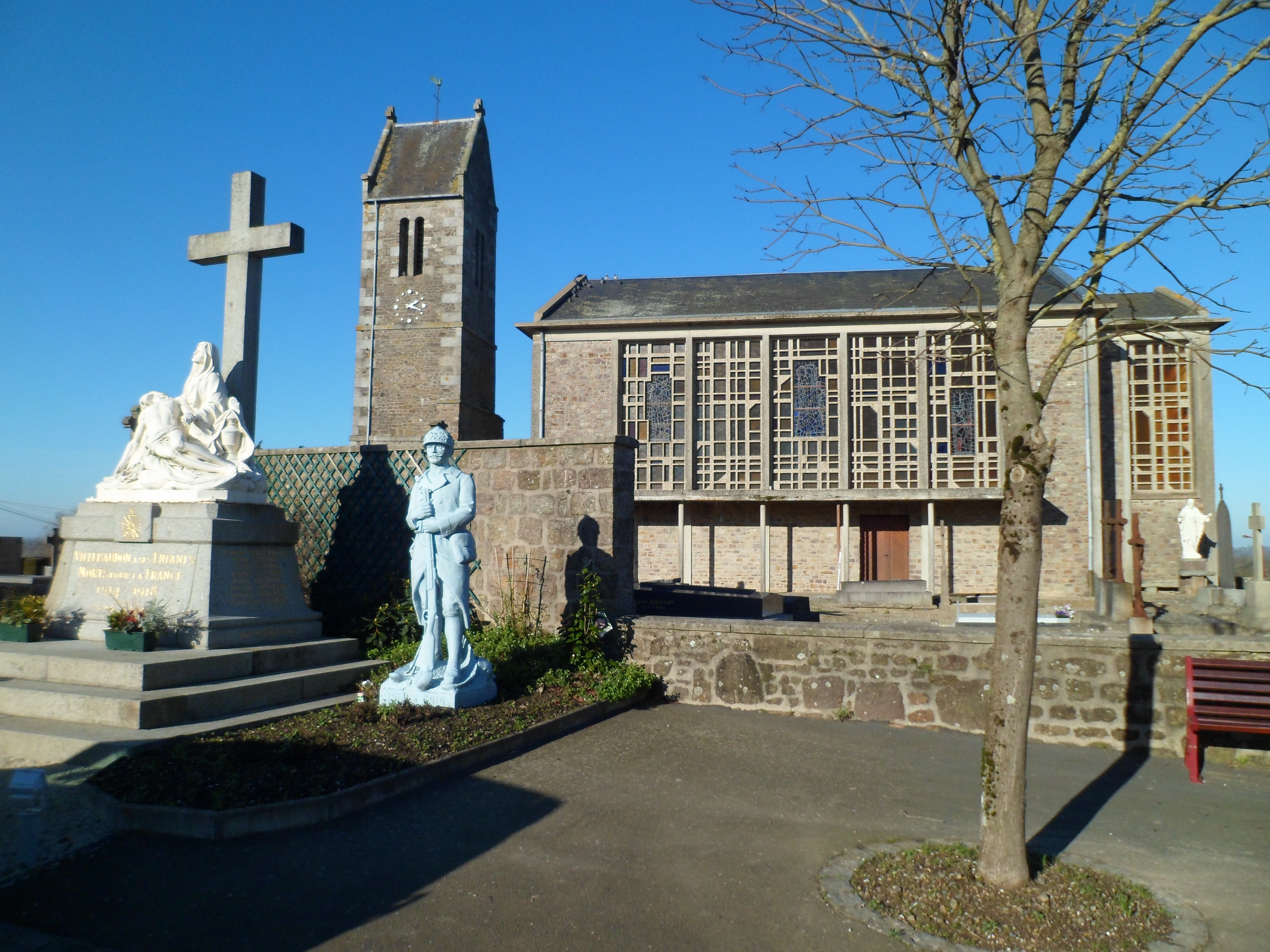
- The church of Sainte-Anne
- Location of Villebaudon
- Location within France Location within Normandy
- Coordinates: 48°57′40″N 1°09′55″W
- Country: France
- Region: Normandy
- Department: Manche
- Arrondissement: Saint-Lô
- Canton: Villedieu-les-Poêles-Rouffigny
- Intercommunality: Villedieu Intercom

Government
  - Mayor (2020–2026): Anne-Sophie Bellenger
- Area^{1}: 5.69 km^{2} (2.20 sq mi)
- Highest elevation: 183 m (600 ft)
- Lowest elevation: 99 m (325 ft)
- Population (2023): 327
  - Density: 57.5/km^{2} (149/sq mi)
- Demonym: Villebaudonnais
- Time zone: UTC+01:00 (CET)
  - Summer (DST): UTC+02:00 (CEST)
- INSEE/Postal code: 50637 /50410
- ^{1} French Land Register data, which excludes lakes, ponds, glaciers > 1 km^{2} (0.386 sq mi or 247 acres) and river estuaries.

Villebaudon is a commune in the Manche department in Normandy in north-western France.

== Transportation ==
Villebaudon is located on the crossroads of the D999 and the D13.

== History ==
The village was liberated during operation 'COBRA' the breakout by the American army on 29 July 1944 after some very heavy fighting lasting 13 hours, 11 German tanks were destroyed and 180 German defenders killed.

== See also ==
- Communes of the Manche department
