= Svensson =

Surname

Svensson (also Svenson and anglicised Swensson, Swenson, Swinson or Swanson) is the ninth most common Swedish family name, as of 2021 there are about 88,000 residents in Sweden with the name in the population register. The name is originally a patronymic surname, literally meaning "son of Sven", or "Sven's son". Sven (in Danish and Norwegian also Svend and in Norwegian also Svein) is a Nordic first name which is used throughout Scandinavia, Estonia and Germany. The name itself is Old Norse for "Young man" or "Young warrior".

== Use as a word ==
In Swedish, "Svensson" is used to signify an ordinary Swedish person (akin to an average Joe), as in "Han är en riktig svensson" ("He's a typical Svensson"). The term can be derogatory or descriptive, depending on context. Similarly, 'medelsvensson' (lit. 'average Svensson') describes a typical Swede.

== Notable people ==
=== A ===
- Adam Svensson (born 1993), Canadian professional golfer
- Alf Svensson (politician) (born 1938), Swedish politician
- Alf Svensson (guitarist) (born 1967), Swedish heavy metal guitarist
- Alice Svensson (born 1991), Swedish singer
- Allan Svensson (1951–2024), Swedish actor
- Amanda Svensson (born 1987), Swedish author
- Amund Svensson (born 1978), Norwegian musician
- Anders Svensson (born 1976), Swedish footballer
- Anders Svensson (bandy) (born 1975), Swedish bandy player
- Anders Svensson (canoeist) (born 1977), Swedish canoeist
- Anders Svensson (footballer, born 1939) (1939–2007), Swedish footballer
- Ann Mari Svensson, Norwegian materials scientist
- Anna-Karin Svensson (born 1974), Swedish tennis player
- Annica Svensson (born 1983), Swedish footballer
- Antero Svensson (1892–1946), Finnish major general
- Arnbjørn Svensson (born 1999), Faroese footballer
- Artur Svensson (1901–1984), Swedish sprinter
- Åsa Svensson (born 1975), Swedish tennis player
- Åsa Svensson (table tennis) (born 1971), Swedish table tennis player

=== B ===
- Bengt Svensson (born 1958), Swedish Army officer
- Bertil Svensson, Swedish footballer
- Björn Svensson (born 1986), Swedish professional ice hockey forward
- Bo Svensson (born 1979), Danish footballer and manager
- Börje Svensson (born 1928), Swedish trade union leader
- Broder Svensson (died 1436), Swedish politician

=== C ===
- Calle Svensson (born 1987), Swedish footballer
- Carl-Enock Svensson (1895–1986), Swedish athlete
- Carl-Wiktor Svensson (born 1990), Swedish politician
- Catharina Svensson (born 1982), Danish beauty pageant contestant and lawyer
- Chris Svensson (1965–2018), British automobile designer

=== D ===
- Daniel Svensson (born 1977), Swedish drummer
- Daniel Svensson (footballer, born 2002) (born 2002), Swedish footballer
- Daniel Svensson (footballer, born 1983), Swedish footballer
- David Svensson (footballer, born 1984), Swedish footballer
- David Svensson (footballer, born 1993), Swedish footballer
- David Svensson (rower) (born 1966), Swedish rower

=== E ===
- Egon Svensson (1913–1995), Swedish Greco-Roman wrestler
- Einar Svensson (1894–1959), Swedish sportsman
- Elin Svensson (1879–1960), Swedish missionary
- Ellenor Svensson (born 1971), Swedish swimmer
- Elsa Svensson (born 2003), Swedish professional golfer
- Emanuel Svensson (born 1989), Swedish footballer
- Emma Hawia Svensson (born 1990), Swedish handball player
- Erik Svensson (1903–1986), Swedish athlete
- Erik Svensson (footballer) (1903–1942), Swedish footballer
- Esbjörn Svensson (1964–2008), Swedish jazz pianist
- Eva Svensson (born 1987), Swedish orienteer and ski-orienteer
- Eva-Britt Svensson (born 1946), Swedish politician
- Evert Svensson (1925–2024), Swedish politician

=== F ===
- Felix Svensson (born 1997), Swiss sprinter
- Fredrik Svensson (race walker) (born 1973), Swedish racewalker
- Fredrik Svensson (ice hockey) (born 1975), Swedish ice hockey player
- Fredrik Svensson (presenter) (born 1990), Swedish television personality
- Frida Svensson (rower) (born 1981), Swedish professional sculler
- Frida Svensson (athlete) (born 1970), Swedish hurdler
- Fritiof Svensson (1896–1961), Swedish wrestler

=== G ===
- Gärda Svensson (1895–1985), Swedish politician
- Georg Svensson (1908–1970), Swedish water polo player
- Gerry Svensson (1958–2005), Swedish wrestler
- Göran Svensson (1959–1995), Swedish discus thrower
- Gösta Svensson (1929–2018), Swedish high jumper
- Gottfrid Svensson (1889–1956), Swedish wrestler
- Gun Svensson (born 1937), Swedish politician
- Gunnar Svensson (1956–2020), Swedish ice hockey player
- Gunnar Svensson (sport shooter) (born 1953), Swedish sports shooter
- Gustaf Svensson (1882–1950), Swedish sailor
- Gustav Svensson (born 1987), Swedish footballer

=== H ===
- Håkan Svensson (born 1970), Swedish footballer
- Hans Svensson (born 1955), Swedish rower
- Harry Svensson (born 1945), Swedish footballer
- Helena Svensson (golfer) (born 1979), Swedish golfer
- Henning Svensson (1891–1979), Swedish footballer
- Herta Svensson (1886–1981), Swedish educator, social worker, and personnel consultant
- Hilda Svensson (born 2006), Swedish ice hockey player

=== I ===
- Ing-Marie Svensson (born 1950), Swedish canoeist
- Ingemar Svensson (1929–2004), Swedish rower
- Ingvar Svensson (politician) (born 1944), Swedish politician
- Ingvar Svensson (footballer) (born 1939), Swedish footballer and manager
- Ivar Svensson (1893–1934), Swedish footballer

=== J ===
- Jan Svensson (footballer, born 1956), Swedish footballer
- Jan Svensson (footballer, born 1944), Swedish footballer
- Jesper Svensson (bowler) (born 1995), Swedish professional bowler
- Jesper Svensson (golfer) (born 1996), Swedish professional golfer
- Jesper Svensson (footballer) (born 1990), Swedish footballer
- Johan Svensson (footballer) (born 1981), Swedish footballer
- Johan Svensson (Swedish Air Force officer) (born 1962), Swedish Air Force officer
- Johan Svensson (cyclist) (born 1979), Swedish cyclist
- Jonas Svensson (tennis) (born 1966), Swedish tennis player
- Jonas Svensson (footballer) (born 1993), Norwegian footballer
- Jonas Svensson (bandy) (born 1983), Swedish bandy player
- Jonathan Svensson (born 2000), Swedish politician
- Jörn Svensson (1936–2021), Swedish politician

=== K ===
- Kalle Svensson (1925–2000), Swedish footballer
- Kamma Svensson (1908–1998), Danish illustrator
- Karl Johan Svensson (1887–1964), Swedish artistic gymnast
- Karl Svensson (born 1984), Swedish former professional footballer
- Karl-Erik Svensson (1891–1978), Swedish gymnast
- Karl-Gustaf Svensson (1879–1962), Swedish sports shooter
- Kjell Svensson (born 1938), Swedish ice hockey player
- Klara Svensson (born 1987), Swedish boxer
- Kristian Svensson (born 1981), Swedish handball player
- Kurt Svensson (footballer) (1927–2016), Swedish footballer
- Kurt Svensson (ice hockey) (born 1940), Swedish ice hockey player

=== L ===
- Lars E. O. Svensson (born 1947), Swedish economist
- Lars Georg Svensson (born 1966), American cardiologist
- Lars Svensson (ornithologist) (born 1941), Swedish ornithologist
- Lars Svensson (ice hockey) (1926–1999), Swedish ice hockey player
- Leif Svensson (born 1951), Swedish ice hockey player
- Lennart Svensson (footballer) (1934–2025), Swedish footballer
- Lennart Svensson (wrestler) (born 1950), Swedish wrestler
- Linnea Svensson (born 1999), Swedish footballer
- Lisa Emelia Svensson, Swedish diplomat

=== M ===
- Madelein Svensson (born 1969), Swedish racewalker
- Magnus Svensson (footballer) (born 1969), Swedish footballer
- Magnus Svensson (floorball) (born 1983), Swedish floorball player
- Magnus Svensson (ice hockey, born 1963), Swedish ice hockey player
- Malcolm Svensson (1885–1961), Swedish hammer thrower
- Marcus Svensson (born 1990), Swedish sport shooter
- Margareta Svensson (born 1968), Musical artist, Vocal coach
- Marie Svensson (born 1967), Swedish table tennis player
- Markus Svensson (born 1984), Swedish ice hockey player
- Martin Svensson (singer) (born 1978), Swedish singer, musician
- Martin Svensson (footballer) (born 1989), Danish footballer
- Mathias Svensson (born 1974), Swedish footballer
- Mats Svensson (born 1943), Swedish swimmer
- Mattias Svensson (born 1972), Swedish writer and political commentator
- Max Svensson (footballer, born 1998), Swedish footballer
- Max Svensson (footballer, born 2001), Spanish footballer
- Michael Svensson (born 1975), Swedish footballer
- Monica Svensson (born 1978), Swedish racewalker

=== N ===
- Niklas Svensson (born 1973), Swedish journalist and media personality
- Nils Svensson (born 2002), Swedish footballer
- Nils-Gunnar Svensson (born 1952), Swedish ice hockey player

=== O ===
- Ola Svensson (born 1986), Swedish recording artist
- Ola Svensson (footballer, born 1964), Swedish footballer
- Ola Svensson (footballer, born 1967), Swedish footballer
- Oskar Svensson (born 1995), Swedish cross-country skier

=== P ===
- Peder Svensson (c. 1470 – before 1547), Swedish chieftain
- Pelle Svensson (1943–2020), Swedish wrestler and lawyer
- Per Svensson (actor) (born 1965), Swedish actor
- Per Svensson (ice hockey) (born 1988), Swedish ice hockey player
- Per Tage Svensson (born 1931), Swedish speedway rider
- Per-Olof Svensson (1942–2012), Swedish politician
- Peter Svensson (born 1974), Swedish musician
- Peter Svensson (tennis) (born 1961), Swedish tennis player
- Peter Svensson (handballer) (born 1983), Danish handball player

=== R ===
- Ragnar Svensson (sailor) (1882–1959), Swedish sailor
- Ragnar Svensson (wrestler) (1934–2025), Swedish wrestler
- Rasmus Svensson (born 1971), Swedish footballer
- Reinhold Svensson (1919–1968), Swedish composer
- Roland Svensson (1910–2003), Swedish painter, writer, black and white artist and illustrator
- Roland Svensson (wrestler) (1945–2014), Swedish wrestler
- Rolf Svensson (born 1935), Swedish archer
- Ruben Svensson (born 1953), Swedish footballer
- Rudolf Svensson (1899–1978), Swedish wrestler

=== S ===
- Sigurd Svensson (1912–1969), Swedish equestrian
- Sofia Svensson (1873–1923), Swedish politician
- Stefan Svensson (born 1962), Swedish tennis player
- Stefan Svensson (footballer) (born 1958), Swedish footballer
- Stig Svensson (1914–2004), Swedish football player
- Stina Svensson (born 1970), Swedish politician
- Suzanne Svensson (born 1958), Swedish politician
- Sven Otto Svensson, Swedish chess player
- Sven Svensson (1636–1696), Swedish-American politician
- Sven-Ove Svensson (1923–1987), Swedish football player

=== T ===
- Tenny Svensson (born 1952), Swedish tennis player
- Thorsten Svensson (1901–1954), Swedish footballer
- Tina Svensson (born 1966), Norwegian footballer
- Tomas Svensson (born 1968), Swedish handball player
- Tommy Svensson (born 1945), Swedish footballer and manager
- Tore Svensson (1927–2002), Swedish footballer

=== V ===
- Valborg Svensson (1903–1983), Swedish journalist and politician
- Victoria Sandell Svensson (born 1977), Swedish footballer
- Viktor Svensson (born 1990), Swedish footballer

== Fictional characters ==
- Emil Svensson, in Emil i Lönneberga by Astrid Lindgren

== See also ==
- Sveinson
- Svendsen
- Svensen (disambiguation)
- Swenson (disambiguation)
