= Swenson =

Swenson may refer to:

- Swenson (surname), including a list of people with the name
- Swenson Gym, a sports venue at Weber State University, Utah, US
- Swenson, Texas, US, an unincorporated community
- Swenson Arts and Technology High School, in Philadelphia, Pennsylvania, US
- Swensons, an American restaurant chain

== See also ==
- Swensen's, an international chain of ice cream restaurants
- Swenson Red, a grape variety
- Svensson, a Swedish family name
- USS Lyman K. Swenson, a US Navy destroyer
