= David Svensson =

David Svensson may refer to:

- David Svensson (footballer, born 1984), Swedish footballer for Falkenbergs FF
- David Svensson (footballer, born 1993), Swedish footballer for Helsingborgs IF
- David Svensson (rower) (born 1966), Swedish Olympic rower
