= Skirö =

Coordinates: 59°08′N 16°40′E

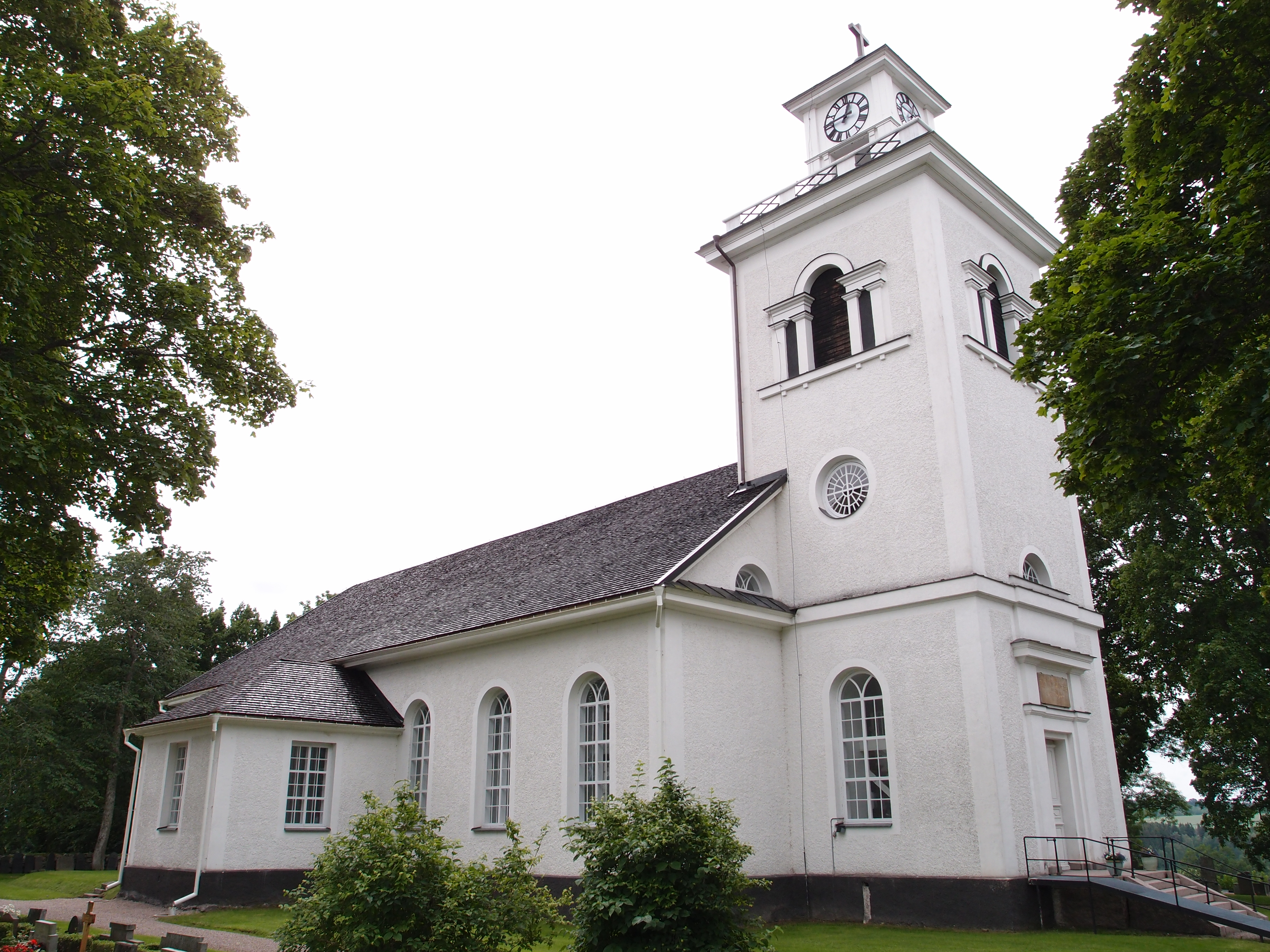
- Skirö Church in July 2011

- Location within Jönköping Location within Sweden
- Country: Sweden
- Province: Småland
- County: Jönköping
- Municipality: Vetlanda

Population (31 December 2010)
  - Total: 70
  - Density: 2.8/km^{2} (7.3/sq mi)
- Time zone: UTC+1 (CET)
  - Summer (DST): UTC+2 (CEST)

Skirö (Swedish pronunciation: [ˈɧîːrœ]) is a small village in Vetlanda Municipality in Sweden. It lies 25 km from the town of Vetlanda in the southeastern part of Jönköping County and has a population of about 70 (2010). Situated in a beautiful setting around Lake Skirö, it was dubbed Smålands trädgård ("The Garden of Småland") by Carolus Linnaeus. It was also the birthplace of botanist Eric Ragnar Sventenius (1910–1973).

From 1952 to 1970 Skirö was part of Nye Municipality. Since 1971 it has been in Vetlanda Municipality. The village is about 12 km across and 7 km wide with a total area of ca 44 hectares. There are some large mansions such as Wallby and Gölberga not far from the village.
