= Swenson (surname) =

Swenson is a surname. Notable people with the surname include:

- Amanda Swenson (1852–1919), Swedish-born American soprano singer
- Bob Swenson (born 1953), American football player
- Cal Swenson (1948–2014), Canadian ice hockey player
- Chuck Swenson (born 1953), American college basketball coach
- Doug Swenson (1945-2009), American politician, lawyer, and judge
- Earl Swensson (c. 1931–2022), American architect
- Elmer Swenson (1913–2004), pioneering grape breeder
- Erick Swenson (born 1972), American artist
- Gloria Josephine Swenson, birth name of silent film actress Gloria Swanson (1899–1983)
- Inga Swenson (1932–2023), American actress
- Kari Swenson (born 1961), biathlete
- Karl Swenson (1908–1978), American actor
- Kaycee Nicole Swenson (born 1960), fictitious persona, well-known case of Münchausen by Internet from 1999 to 2001.
- Ken Swenson (born 1948), American middle distance runner
- Lyman Knute Swenson (1892–1942), U.S. Naval officer killed in World War II
- Mary Ann Swenson (born 1947), American United Methodist bishop
- May Swenson (1913–1989), American poet and playwright
- Norma Meras Swenson (1932–2025), American reproductive rights activist
- Pete Swenson (born 1967), American ski mountaineer
- Rick Swenson (born 1950), American dog musher
- Robert Swenson (1957–1997), aka Jeep Swenson, professional wrestler
- Ruth Ann Swenson (born 1959), American soprano
- Swante M. Swenson (1816–1896), American founder of SMS ranches, first Swedish immigrant in Texas
- William D. Swenson (born 1978), United States Army Officer, Recipient of the Medal of Honor
