= Anna Bråkenhielm =

Swedish businessperson

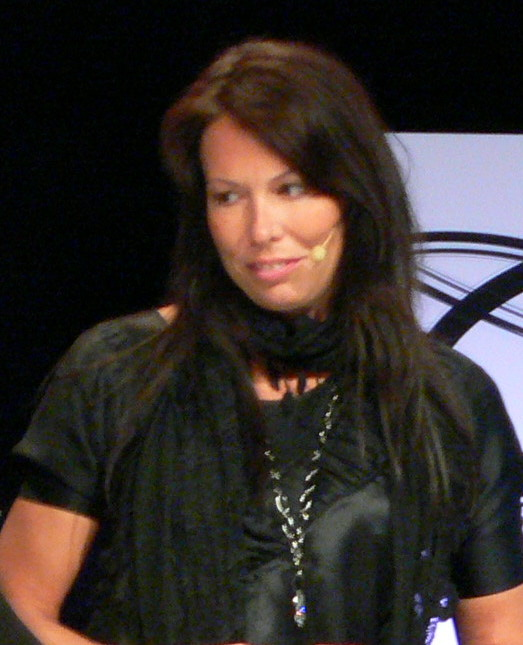
- Bråkenhielm in 2008
- Born: Anna Birgitta Bråkenhielm; 10 July 1966 (age 59); Kalmar, Sweden
- Other name: Anna Carrfors Bråkenhielm
- Occupation: Business leader
- Years active: 1997–present
- Known for: Television programming

Anna Birgitta Bråkenhielm (born 10 July 1966), during a period of time Anna Carrfors Bråkenhielm, is a Swedish business leader and producer of television programming. She was also owner and CEO of the magazine Passion for Business and presented the radio show Sommar i P1 (Summer on P1).

== Early life ==
Bråkenhielm was born on 10 July 1966 in Kalmar and grew up in Wallby Säteri outside Vetlanda, Sweden. She is the daughter of landlord and Governor of Kalmar, Peder Bråkenhielm and Kristianstad Anita Bråkenhielm.

== Career ==
Bråkenhielm began her career as a journalist and PR consultant. and became a media entrepreneur and business executive, including founding a business magazine aimed at women in business.

=== Strix Television and Silverback ===
As a CEO of Strix Television she was responsible for buying the television entertainment concept Expedition Robinson (also known as Survivor in some parts of the world). Swedish television station SVT became the first channel in the world to air the concept in 1997. Bråkenhielm later became the CEO of the production company called Silverback, which she sold in 2009 to TV Global Content.

=== Scandinavian Studios ===
Until 2004, she was the CEO of the production company Scandinavian Studios which worked with TV. In 2011, Bråkenhielm and Bonnier started the production company Scandinavian Studios, the production company which suffered losses both in 2011 and 2012 with losses totaling 15 million (SEK). Bråkenhielm, in 2014, sold her 32% share and was bought out of the company.

=== Radio ===
Bråkenhielm presented the radio show Sommar i P1, broadcast on Sveriges Radio in 2010.

=== Magazine ===
She was also owner and CEO of the magazine Passion for Business which aims to reach women in business.

== Awards ==
Coming from Småland, Bråkenhielm won the "Småländer of the Year Award" in 2001.

== Personal life ==
Bråkenhielm was married to Mattias Hansson between 1996 and 1998, and for a few months in 2001 to businessman Tomas Carrfors. As of 2015, she owns a dressage horse riding facility at Österlen.
