= Svensen =

Svensen or Svensén may refer to

- Svensen, Oregon, an unincorporated community in the United States
- Åsfrid Svensen (born 1936), Norwegian literary historian
- Alf Svensén (1893–1935), Swedish Olympic gymnast
- Helge Svensen (born 1953), Norwegian luger
- Henrik Svensen (1904–2007), Norwegian judge and politician
- June Svensen (born 1954), Norwegian archer; see 2015 World Archery Championships – Women's team compound
- Sven Hans Jørgen Svensen (1856–1942), Norwegian schoolteacher, school inspector and politician

== See also ==
- Swenson (disambiguation)
