= USS Juneau =

Three ships of the United States Navy have been named USS Juneau, after the city of Juneau, Alaska:

- USS Juneau (CL-52) was an Atlanta-class light cruiser commissioned February 1942 and sunk eight months later in the Naval Battle of Guadalcanal
  - This "Juneau incident" is particularly notable for the loss of the five Sullivan brothers
- USS Juneau (CL-119) was a Juneau-class light cruiser, commissioned 1946, active in the Korean War, and scrapped in 1962
  - Juneau-class cruiser, a USN light cruiser class, a modification of the Atlanta class
- USS Juneau (LPD-10) was an amphibious transport dock, commissioned in 1969 and decommissioned in 2008. Sunk as a target 2026.
