= USS Lyman K. Swenson =

Allen M. Sumner-class destroyer

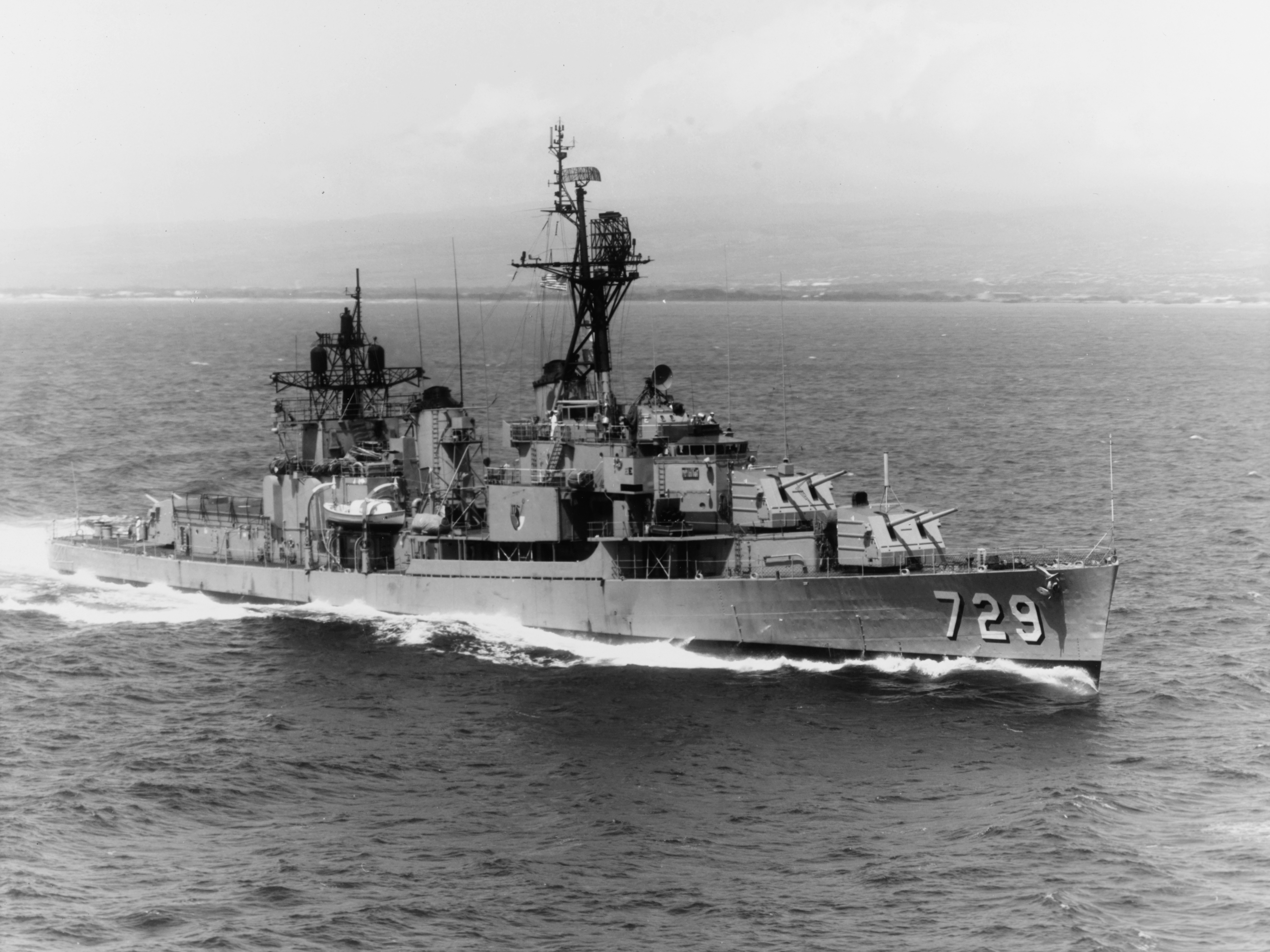
- USS Lyman K. Swenson in 1970

History

United States
- Name: USS Lyman K. Swenson
- Namesake: Lyman Knute Swenson
- Builder: Bath Iron Works
- Laid down: 11 September 1943
- Launched: 12 February 1944
- Commissioned: 2 May 1944
- Decommissioned: 12 February 1971
- Stricken: 1 February 1974
- Identification: DD-729
- Motto: Latin: Audentis fortuna juvat "Fortune favors the bold."
- Fate: To Taiwan 6 May 1974 and cannibalized for spare parts

General characteristics
- Class & type: Allen M. Sumner-class destroyer
- Displacement: 2,200 tons
- Length: 376 ft 6 in (114.76 m)
- Beam: 40 ft (12 m)
- Draft: 15 ft 8 in (4.78 m)
- Propulsion: 60,000 shp (45,000 kW); 2 propellers
- Speed: 34 knots (63 km/h; 39 mph)
- Range: 6,500 nmi (12,000 km; 7,500 mi) at 15 kn (28 km/h; 17 mph)
- Complement: 336
- Armament: 6 × 5 in (127 mm)/38 cal. guns; 12 × 40 mm AA guns; 11 × 20 mm AA guns, 10 × 21 inch (533 mm) torpedo tubes, 6 × depth charge projectors, 2 × depth charge tracks

USS Lyman K. Swenson (DD-729), an Allen M. Sumner-class destroyer, was laid down on 11 September 1943 by Bath Iron Works, Bath, Maine and launched on 12 February 1944; sponsored by Miss Cecelia A. Swenson, daughter of Captain Swenson. The ship was commissioned at Boston Navy Yard on 2 May 1944.

Lyman K. Swenson (DD-729) is the only ship of the United States Navy to be named for Lyman Knute Swenson, who was the captain of the cruiser USS Juneau. Juneau was lost during the Battle of Guadalcanal, taking with it 690 men, including Captain Swenson as well as the five Sullivan brothers. Lyman Swenson was posthumously awarded the Navy Cross for his service.

== Service history ==
=== Initial operations ===
Commissioned after the battle for the Atlantic had been decided, Lyman K. Swenson completed a Bermuda‑based shakedown cruise 25 June 1944 and prepared for duty in the Pacific. Departing Boston on 31 July, the new destroyer transited the Panama Canal on 8 August and arrived at Pearl Harbor on 30 August. After intensive training and practice in antisubmarine warfare (ASW) and antiaircraft warfare (AAW), she departed for the war zone on 28 September, dropping anchor at Ulithi—her base for the next six months‑on 13 October.

=== World War II ===
Lyman K. Swenson left Ulithi on 21 October as part of DesRon 61, screening a replenishment group of ten oilers. This group remained off the Philippines, refueling Admiral Halsey's aircraft carrier forces while the Imperial Japanese Navy suffered defeat at the Battle of Leyte Gulf, 24 to 26 October. The destroyer then joined TG 38.4 for carrier support duties. On 30 October, while supporting operations on Leyte, she saw her first hostile action. Carriers Franklin and Belleau Wood received hits and the group retired to Ulithi for replenishment and repairs.

During much of November and December, Lyman K. Swenson screened various carrier groups engaged in the process of softening up the island of Luzon. Mid‑December witnessed the rescue of four pilots and three enlisted men while on plane guard duty, and a typhoon, known as Typhoon Cobra or the Typhoon of 1944, which generated waves 50 and 60 feet (15 and 18 m) high. Though three destroyers capsized, Lyman K. Swenson emerged safely and returned to Ulithi.

The new year dawned as she steamed with TG 38.1 on a 3,800‑mile raid which spewed destruction on Formosa, Luzon, and on Japanese shipping along the Vietnamese and Chinese coasts. Okinawa also received attention from the carriers' planes before the return to Ulithi on 26 January 1945. For the next four months aircraft and repair centers on Okinawa and the Japanese home island of Kyushu were the main targets for the strike group temporarily redesignated TG 58.1.

During the Okinawa campaign the Japanese again attacked with much of their remaining airpower. With air targets plentiful, Lyman K. Swenson shot down her first plane, a Yokosuka P1Y "Frances", on 18 March, and destroyed her second on 27 March. This campaign also provided an opportunity for shore bombardment as she shelled Okino Daita Shima early in March, and Minami Daito Jima in April and again in June. With her sister ships, she then returned to San Pedro Bay, Leyte, to prepare for a mission which would continue until the surrender of Japan 71 days later.

Five carriers, three battleships, six cruisers and their destroyer screen steamed forth on 1 July to practice screen reorientation and conduct antiaircraft practice before proceeding northward to carry the war to the heart of the Japanese home islands. Air opposition remained minimal; and, after DesRon 61's anti-shipping sweep into Sagami Wan, Honshū, on the night of 22/23 July, enemy ships also proved difficult to locate. Lyman K. Swenson remained in enemy waters until after Japan's formal surrender on board battleship Missouri on 2 September.

On 20 September came the order to depart Tokyo Bay; and, after picking up additional passengers in Okinawa, Lyman K. Swenson proceeded back to the United States. She reached Seattle on 15 October, and then settled down in dry dock at San Francisco on 29 October. Lyman K. Swenson returned to the Far East as part of the 7th Fleet from 2 March 1946 to 22 February 1947. After performing patrol duties along the Chinese, Korean, and Japanese coasts, she steamed home to San Diego via Kwajalein, arriving 22 February. For the next two years she trained both her own crew and Naval reservists off the west coast.

=== Korea ===
In March 1950 she again turned westward. A member of DesRon 9, she worked with the carrier Boxer out of Okinawa until the outbreak of the Korean War brought immediate assignment to Korean waters. Reacting with the characteristic speed of seaborn power, her group launched the first carrier based strike against North Korea 3 July. Besides plane guard and patrol duties she also participated in shore bombardment and five support missions along the eastern coast.

Missions near Yongdok from 22 to 26 July and against Chongjin in the far northeast corner of Korea on 20 August were among the more successful ones.

On 12 September Lyman K. Swenson sailed as part of Task Element 90.62, the Destroyer Element of the Gunfire Support Group of the Inchon Attack Force. The following day at noon the six-ship Destroyer Element stood into Inchon harbor. On the way in they encountered a mine field. Because it was low tide the mines were visible, floating on the surface. Lyman K. Swenson destroyed one mine with 40 mm gunfire.

After anchoring in assigned positions, the destroyers conducted a one-hour bombardment against observed and suspected gun positions on the island of Wolmi-do and in the city of Inchon. This reconnaissance-in-force was intended to draw the fire of North Korean batteries. Thus their location would be revealed for neutralization by destroyer or cruiser gunfire, or by air strikes. The bombardment was highly successful. The press, and later on the historians, aptly dubbed the ships of the Destroyer Element as "Sitting Ducks". Upon retirement from the harbor, some enemy guns that had not been silenced opened up on the narrow channel through which the destroyers must pass. Shell fragments killed one officer and wounded another on board Lyman K. Swenson during channel transit.

On D‑Day, 15 September, Swenson returned eagerly to cover the landing and shell the enemy. For their gallantry all six ships received the Navy Unit Commendation and the Korean Presidential Unit Citation.

On 23 October, Lyman K. Swenson retired to Sasebo, Japan, and then on to the United States, arriving San Diego 18 November. After 7 months at home, she again departed for Korea 18 June 1951. On this 8‑month tour, and the succeeding one which began 15 September 1952, her main duties remained much the same as they had been during 1950. She took special pride in her ability to disrupt railroad and highway transportation and twice earned the praise of Vice Adm. H. M. Martin.

=== 1953-1965 ===
In the aftermath of the Korean Armistice in July 1953, Lyman K. Swenson continued to average one six-month deployment annually in the western Pacific until 1960. To catch up with changing technology she entered the Mare Island Naval Shipyard 27 June 1960 for a FRAM II refit. Antisubmarine warfare capabilities received the greatest emphasis as she received a helicopter flight and hangar deck. Following underway training and exercises, she departed 6 January 1962 with DesDiv 92 for a prolonged stay in the Far East. Yokosuka, Japan, served as her new home port. Periods of patrol duty preceded and followed SEATO operation "Tulungan", the largest peacetime amphibious landing operation ever conducted in the western Pacific. During the next two years, the ship ranged widely over the Far East. After particularly extensive 7th Fleet exercise "Crazy Horse," she paid a three-day good will visit to Bangkok, Thailand, and a four-day visit to Saigon.

On 12 June 1964, Lyman K. Swenson departed Yokosuka for the United States, arriving San Diego 27 July via Australia. Once home, time passed quickly until January 1965 when she entered Puget Sound Navy Yard for overhaul. Following refresher training, she helped host four Japan Self-Defense Forces destroyers in San Diego on a summer cruise.

With orders to proceed to the troubled coast of the Republic of Vietnam, Lyman K. Swenson departed San Diego 24 August 1965 and commenced fire support operations 4 October. In her first two weeks of action she expended as much ammunition as two months of comparable duty during the Korean War in 1950. Screen and plane guard duties for carriers Independence and Ticonderoga normally followed such periods of fire support.

=== 1966-1974 ===
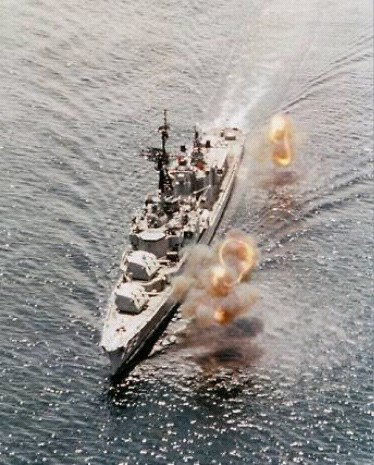
Lyman K. Swenson shelling Vietnamese targets in 1969

Lyman K. Swenson continued on station until departing for home in January 1966. She arrived in San Diego 26 February and participated in the annual midshipmen training cruise in June. For the remainder of 1966 Lyman K. Swenson operated out of her home port of San Diego on various ASW and gunnery exercises. From. 26 January to 1 March 1967 she underwent predeployment repairs in Long Beach Naval Shipyard.

On 8 April the ship once again underway for the western Pacific. After a stop in Yokosuka, Japan, she operated in the northern Tonkin Gulf as a search and rescue unit from May through August. She escorted the carrier Constellation into September, then sailed once again for home. Arriving home on 6 October 1967, after another successful deployment, the veteran destroyer served as an engineering school ship and was assigned availability to the Development and Training Command into 1968. She remained in the eastern Pacific through most of 1968, deploying to WestPac again late in the year, to serve there into 1969.

Lyman K. Swenson began her final deployment on 9 March 1970. While in WESTPAC the ship fired several naval gunfire support missions off the coast of the Republic of Vietnam, served as Search and Rescue picket escort, and escorted aircraft carriers in the Gulf of Tonkin. The destroyer returned to her home port of San Diego on 5 September 1970.

=== Fate ===
Lyman K. Swenson was decommissioned on 12 February 1971 and then later stricken from the register on 1 February 1974. Within months she was sold to Taiwan 6 May 1974 and cannibalized for spare parts.

Lyman K. Swenson received five battle stars for World War II service and six battle stars for Korean service.
