= Sveinson =

Sveinson is a surname, similar to Svensson. Notable people with the surname include:

- Ben Sveinson (born 1945), Canadian politician
- Bill Sveinson (1946–2020), Canadian poker player and politician
- Danny Sveinson (born 1991), Canadian guitarist
