= Medelsvensson =

Term referring to an average Swedish person

In Sweden, Medelsvensson (literally "average Svensson", but commonly translated as "an average Swede") is a statistically average Swedish person, similar to Average Joe. Colloquially it may also be a humorous, mildly derogatory reference to a representative of the Swedish lower middle class. The surname Svensson itself may be used as a reference to an average Swede.

== Origins ==
Frans Lundgren described it as a "statistical fiction, medial metatype and political imagination". The name is traced back to the beginning of the 20th century when a joke character "herr Medelsvensson" appeared in newspapers and advertisements. Originally he was a corpulent upper-class man, but gradually he turned into a statistically averaged middle-class person. The name was used in caricatures, exhibitions, and competitions for the most average family, as well as in statistical data. It is often claimed that the name went into mainstream since the Stockholm Exhibition of 1930. During these times Svensson was the most common Swedish surname.

== Who is Medelsvensson ==
The Statistical Yearbook of Sweden 2014 contains a whole section 25.1 Medelsvensson/ The average Swede. Before providing data about Medelsvensson, the Statistics Sweden gives some background.

We at Statistics Sweden often get questions about who Medelsvensson is. You could say a lot about the woman Medelsvensson and the man Medelsvensson, likewise about the children in an average couple's relationship. But putting together an average "family" is more difficult because there is no way to identify via existing population registers cohabitation relationships. Sweden's average man and average woman do not live together as a family.

Based on statistics for 2009-2012, neither man nor woman Medelsvensson has the surname Svensson, and this surname was only 9th most common in Sweden. Medelsvennson man was 40 years old and woman 42 years old. His name was Karl Fredrik Johansson. Her name was Anna Maria Andersson. The section has several pages of various statistical data about Medelsvenssons Fredrik and Anna.

There is a common saying that Medelsvensson has three V's: a villa, a Volvo, and a vovve (doggy). However, Statistics Sweden reported in 2012 that while the Medelsvensson family (whose surname was Johansson) did have a villa and a Volvo, it had no dog.

== See also ==
- List of terms referring to an average person
