= Lyman Knute Swenson =

United States Navy submarine commander and Navy Cross recipient

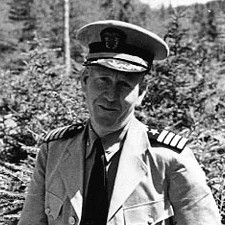
- Swenson in June 1942
- Born: October 23, 1892; Pleasant Grove, Utah
- Died: November 13, 1942 (aged 50); Killed in action during the Naval Battle of Guadalcanal
- Military career
- Allegiance: United States of America
- Branch: United States Navy
- Service years: 1916–1942
- Rank: Captain
- Commands: USS Isabel (PY-10); Destroyer Division 64; USS Juneau (CL-52)
- Conflicts: World War I World War II: Battle of the Santa Cruz Islands; Naval Battle of Guadalcanal †
- Awards: Navy Cross

Lyman Knute Swenson (23 October 1892 – 13 November 1942), was an American naval officer. Swenson was born in Pleasant Grove, Utah and graduated from the Naval Academy on June 2, 1916. After service on board USS Vermont (BB-20) and USS Denver (C-14), he prepared for submarine duty. After serving on board USS D-1 (SS-17) during World War I, he was given command of USS H-6 (SS-149) on 26 May 1919.

In 1921 he returned to surface ships, serving on USS Arkansas (BB-33) and USS New Mexico (BB-40), before commanding USS Isabel (PY-10) and then Destroyer Division 64. USS Juneau (CL-52) came under his command 18 December 1941 while still under construction. The newly promoted captain and the newly built light cruiser were both lost in the latter stage of the Naval Battle of Guadalcanal 13 November 1942. Twice torpedoed during what historian S. E. Morison called the "wildest most desperate sea fight since Jutland", Juneau sank rapidly, taking under the captain and most of her crew, including the five Sullivan brothers. This battle prevented the Japanese from landing reinforcements on Guadalcanal.

For his "extraordinary heroism...daring and determination..." Captain Swenson was posthumously awarded the Navy Cross.

== Personal life ==
Milo Abercrombie, ca 1915.

Newlyweds LT Lyman K. Swenson USN and Milo Abercrombie, on Submarine H-6, San Pedro, CA 1920

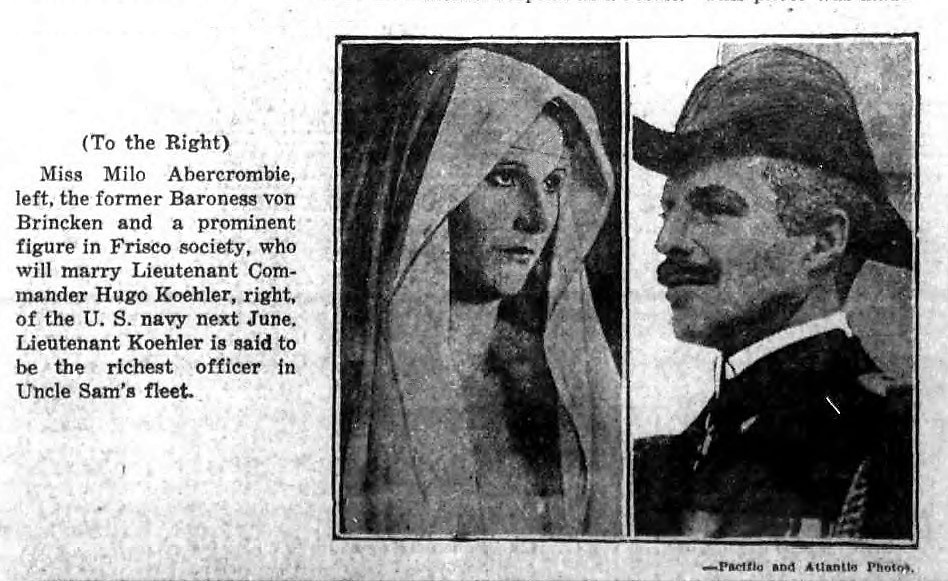
False report of LCDR Hugo W. Koehler's engagement to marry Milo Abercrombia, October 1925

In August 1920, then Lieutenant Swenson married the San Francisco socialite Milo Abercrombie (1894-1977). Born in Houston, Milo was the niece of John W. Abercrombie, U.S. congressman from Alabama and the former wife of the convicted World War One German spy and later, Hollywood movie actor, Wilhelm von Brincken. Abercrombie, acclaimed by noted portraitist Harrison Fisher as "California's greatest beauty", had married von Brincken in 1915 when he was a German military attaché in San Francisco. She divorced him in 1919 and was awarded custody of their two children while he was imprisoned at McNeil Island Federal Penitentiary on Puget Sound, after being convicted in the Hindu–German Conspiracy Trial for plotting to foment an insurrection against British colonial rule in India. Following her divorce, she changed her and their two children's last names back to her maiden name.

When the Roman Catholic Church forbade Abercrombie's intended marriage to Swenson, due to her divorce, von Brincken came forth and disclosed his earlier marriage to Alice M. Roedel. As both Roedel and von Brincken were Catholic, that marriage was sanctioned by the Church. Thus, the Church did not recognize von Brincken's later marriage to Abercrombie. Abercrombie and Swenson, who had both refused to marry unless it was sanctioned by the Catholic Church were then free to wed. The couple had two children, Lyman K. Jr. ("Robert") and Cecilia. Abercrombie obtained an interlocutory decree of divorce from Swenson in May 1925, with the final decree a year later. Several months later, in October 1925, the newspapers speculated that Abercrombie would marry another naval officer, Lieutenant Commander Hugo W. Koehler, reputed to be the "wealthiest officer" in the Navy. The third generation of a wealthy St. Louis brewery family, Koehler had been a naval intelligence and U.S. State Department spy in South Russia during the Russian Revolution.

Swenson had introduced Milo Abercrombie to Koehler in Honolulu. Koehler was in Panama when he read a newspaper account that he was engaged to marry Milo Abercrombie. Brushing it off, Koehler curtly told the press, "Some error," while Abercrombie did not take it so lightly. "I have been deeply humiliated", she told reporters, her eyes "wet with tears". "This is a most unkind blow of fate. I cannot possibly understand how this false rumor got about." Two years later, Koehler married Matilda Pell, the ex-wife of U.S. Congressman Herbert Pell (D-NY) and mother of future United States Senator Claiborne Pell (D-RI). In a bitter child visitation court battle in 1927 that went all the way to the California Court of Appeals, Abercrombie lost custody of her children with Swenson to him, after making baseless accusations that he had molested their four-year-old daughter, Cecelia. The appellate court excoriated Abercrombie, "[I]in furtherance of a manifest determination to prevent him from ever seeing the children again, under any circumstances, she was instrumental in inspiring and promoting a scheme directly involving one of the children which had for its obvious purpose the ruination of respondent's character as a man, the bringing about of his complete disgrace as a naval officer, and the destruction of the love and affection which his children had theretofore manifested toward him." Swenson v. Swenson (1929) 101 Cal.App. 440. In 1929, Lyman Swenson married Loretta B. Bruner (1897-1979). His son, Lyman K. Swenson, Jr. ("Robert") (1923-2016) was also a US Naval officer.

== Namesake ==
In 1943, the destroyer USS Lyman K. Swenson (DD-729) was named in his honor.
