= Stig Svensson =

Swedish football player

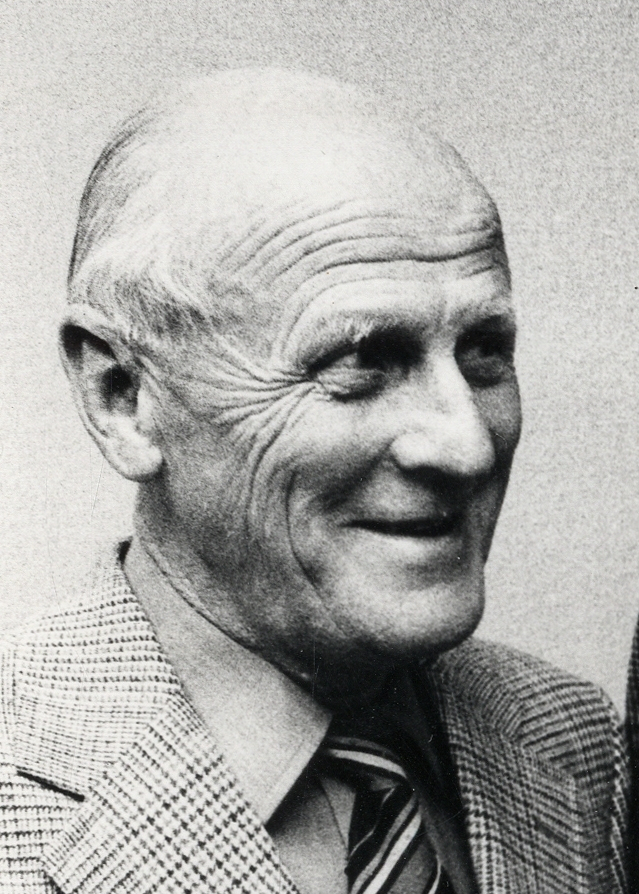

Personal information
- Born: 13 December 1914
- Died: 21 February 2004 (aged 89)

Sport
- Sport: football
- Club: Östers IF

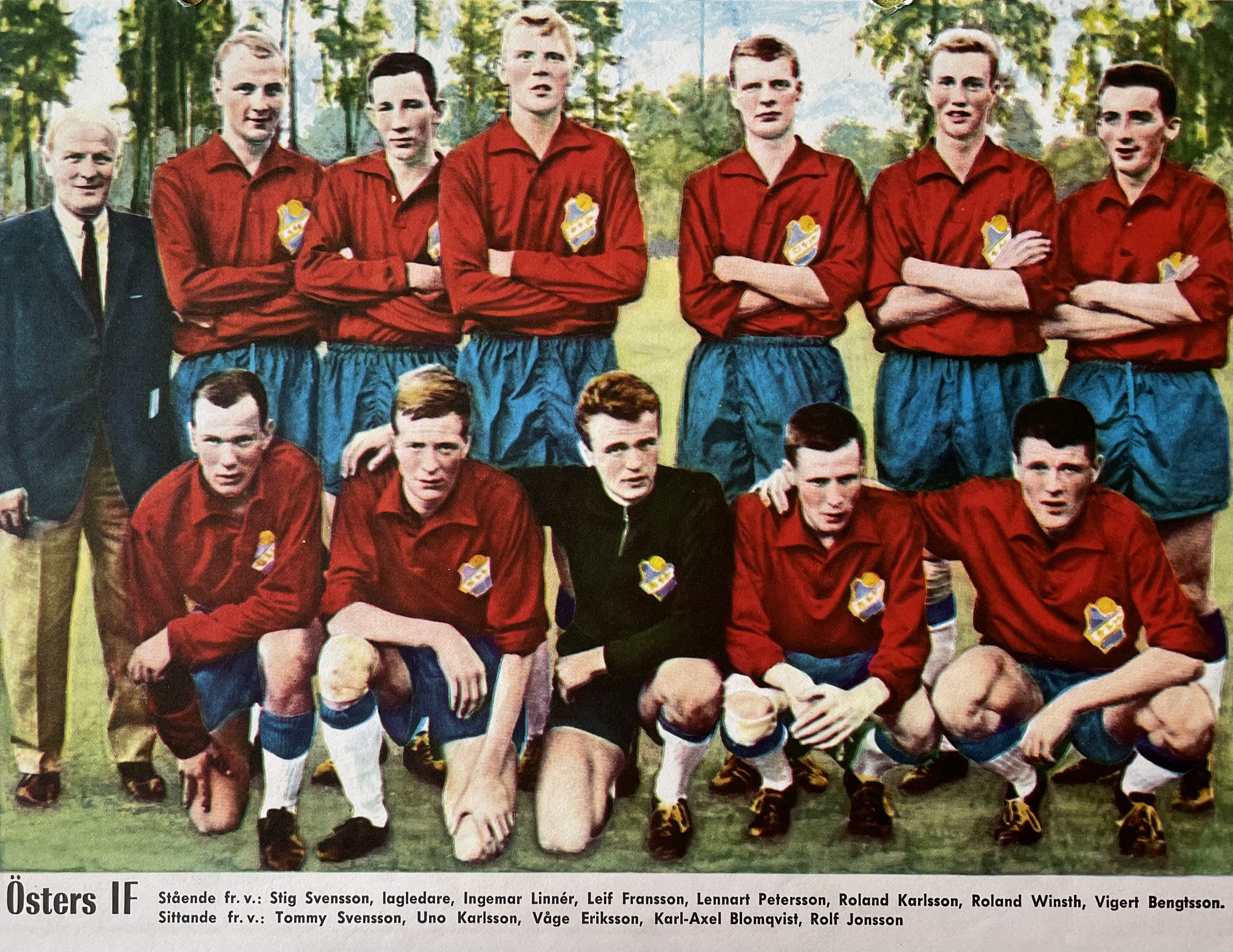
Stig Svensson as manager of Östers IF in 1964, standing far to the left. Among players in this side – Tommy Svensson and Karl-Axel Blomqvist.

Stig Svensson (13 December 1914 – 21 February 2004) was a Swedish football player and football chairman of Östers IF from 1946 to 1989. He took Östers IF from Division 5 to Division 1. He was also the father of Swedish footballer and former Sweden national team coach Tommy Svensson.

== Club career ==
Svensson played for Östers IF and made his debut in 1933. In the 1937 season, he stopped playing due to an injury. In 1942, he became the team captain. The following year Svensson gave up his playing career.

== Chairman ==
After his retirement from football, he took up a leadership career in Östers IF. The club was often called "Svensson IF" due to Svensson's involvement with the club. Shortly after the World War II end, he took over as the association's chairman, and this resulted in some progress. In 1947, the club rises through the division 3 ranks. By 1958, the club rises to Division 2 ranks. In 1961, the club qualifies for Division 1, but it's not until 1967 that the club advances to Division 1. In 1968, the club wins the league in its first season in Division 1, and becomes the national champions in football.

== Impact on Swedish football ==
Svensson is considered to be a pioneer in Swedish football. He took a Division 5 team and made them into a Division 1 team. Svensson is said to have discovered the Brazilian game style before the 1958 World Cup. While he was president, his club was the first to implement legitimate written contract for A-team players in Sweden. While President, his team took the national championships in 1968, 1978, 1980 and 1981. The club also won gold in Swedish Cup in 1977.

When Olympique Marseille bought Anders Linderoth, the French president said, "Actually, I should not buy players from you. I should buy your recipes instead. How do you do in such a small town to get as many good players?"

== Personal life ==
Svensson grew up in Växjö with ten siblings. While playing football, he worked as a timber merchant to supplement his income. Svensson has two sons Tommy Svensson, who was a successful footballer and coach, and son Peter Svensson, he is the grandfather of Joachim Bjorklund and "infected" swear sons Kalle Björklund and Karl-Axel Blomqvist.

In his memoirs, Stig described his success by saying, "We gave football a chance. We never let ourselves be guided on. We believe in camaraderie, the natural form of interaction with football overtones. It's a game with short passes from one side to the other."
