= Ann Mari Svensson =

Norwegian materials scientist

Ann Mari Svensson (born 1968) is a professor in the Department of Materials Science and Engineering at the Norwegian University of Science and Technology (NTNU). Her research concerns electrochemical energy conversion, electric batteries, fuel cells, electrolysis, and the materials used as electrodes in these processes.

Svensson completed her Ph.D. in 1997 at NTNU, and worked at SINTEF before becoming a professor at NTNU in 2012. She was elected to the Royal Norwegian Society of Sciences and Letters in 2023.
