= Nils-Gunnar Svensson =

Swedish ice hockey player

- Born: May 23, 1962 (age 63) Sweden
- Height: 6 ft 0 in (183 cm)
- Weight: 179 lb (81 kg; 12 st 11 lb)
- Position: Defence
- Shot: Right
- Played for: HV71; Team Boro
- NHL draft: Undrafted
- Playing career: 1984–1993

Nils-Gunnar Svensson (born May 23, 1962) is a Swedish former ice hockey player. He played for HV71 and Team Boro during his nine-year professional career. Svensson currently serves as the head coach for HA 74 of the Swedish Division 3.

== Playing career ==
Svensson began his career with HV71 in the Swedish Division 1 during the 1984–85 season, and was a member of the team when they were promoted to the Swedish Hockey League (then known as the Elitserien) for 1985–86. He played five seasons for HV71 in the Elitserien, before joining Team Boro of Division 1 prior to the start of the 1990–91 season. Svensson played three years for Boro, and retired at the conclusion of the 1992–93 season.
