= Tommy Svensson =

Swedish footballer and manager

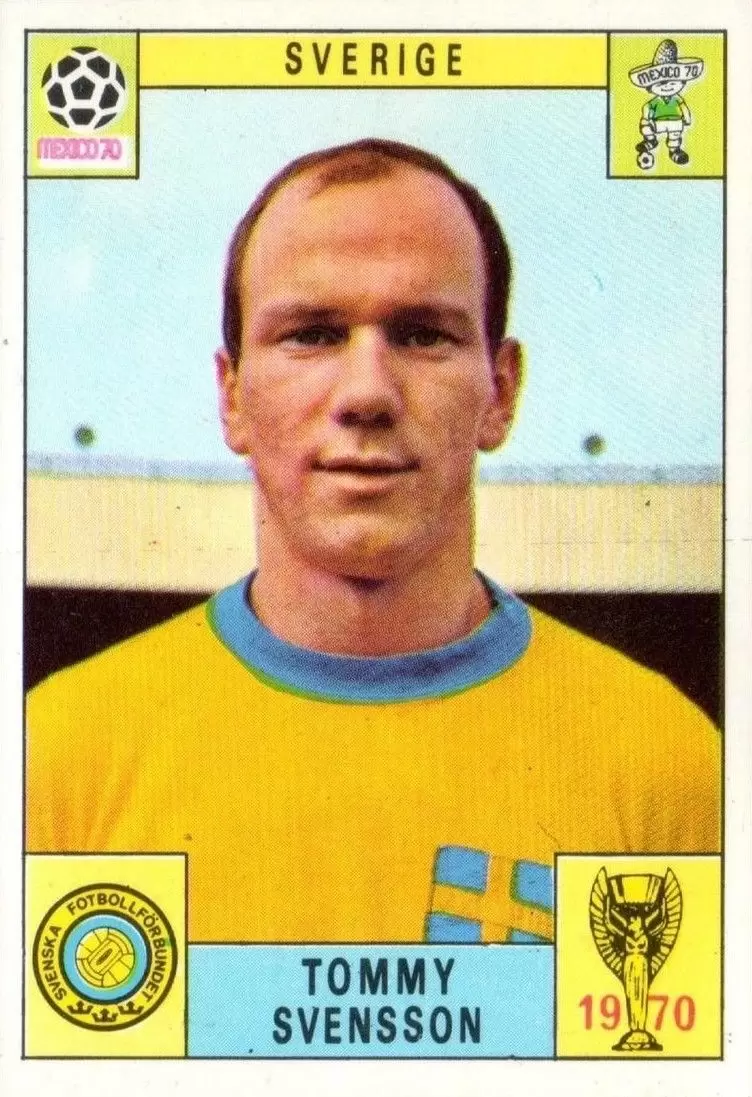
- Svensson at the 1970 FIFA World Cup

Personal information
- Full name: Leif Tommy Svensson
- Date of birth: 4 March 1945 (age 81)
- Place of birth: Växjö, Sweden
- Position: Midfielder

Senior career*
Years	Team	Apps	(Gls)
1964–1971	Östers IF	76	(14)
1971–1973	Standard Liège	41	(3)
1973–1977	Östers IF	103	(11)
Total		220	(28)

International career
1967–1973	Sweden	40	(4)

Managerial career
- 1978–1984: Östers IF (team manager)
- 1985–1986: Alvesta GIF
- 1988–1990: Tromsø IL
- 1991–1997: Sweden
- 2001: Tromsø IL
Medal record
Men's football
Representing Sweden (as manager)
FIFA World Cup
Bronze medal – third place	1994
- * Club domestic league appearances and goals

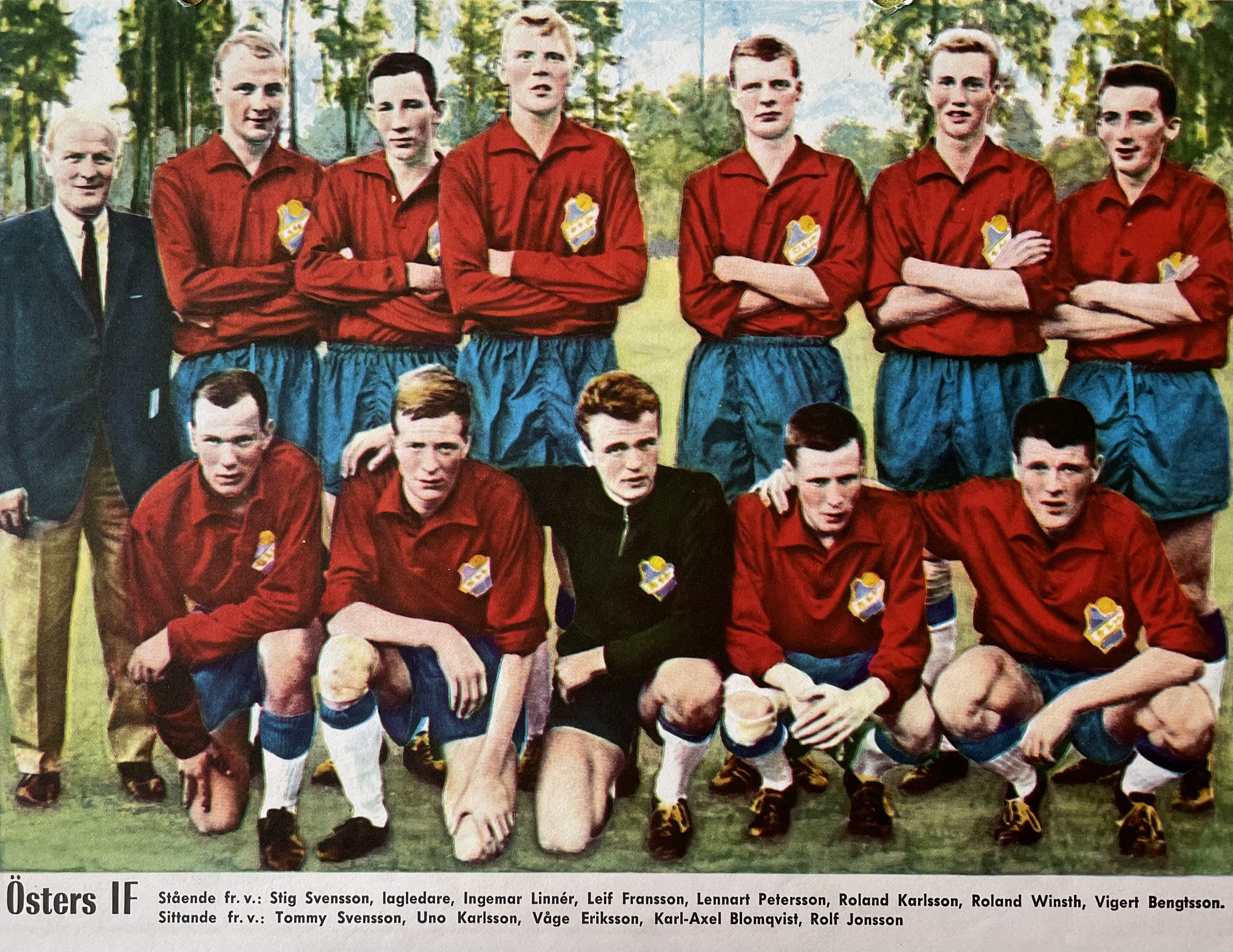
Östers IF in 1964 with Tommy Svensson, far left in the front row. His father Stig Svensson standing just behind him.

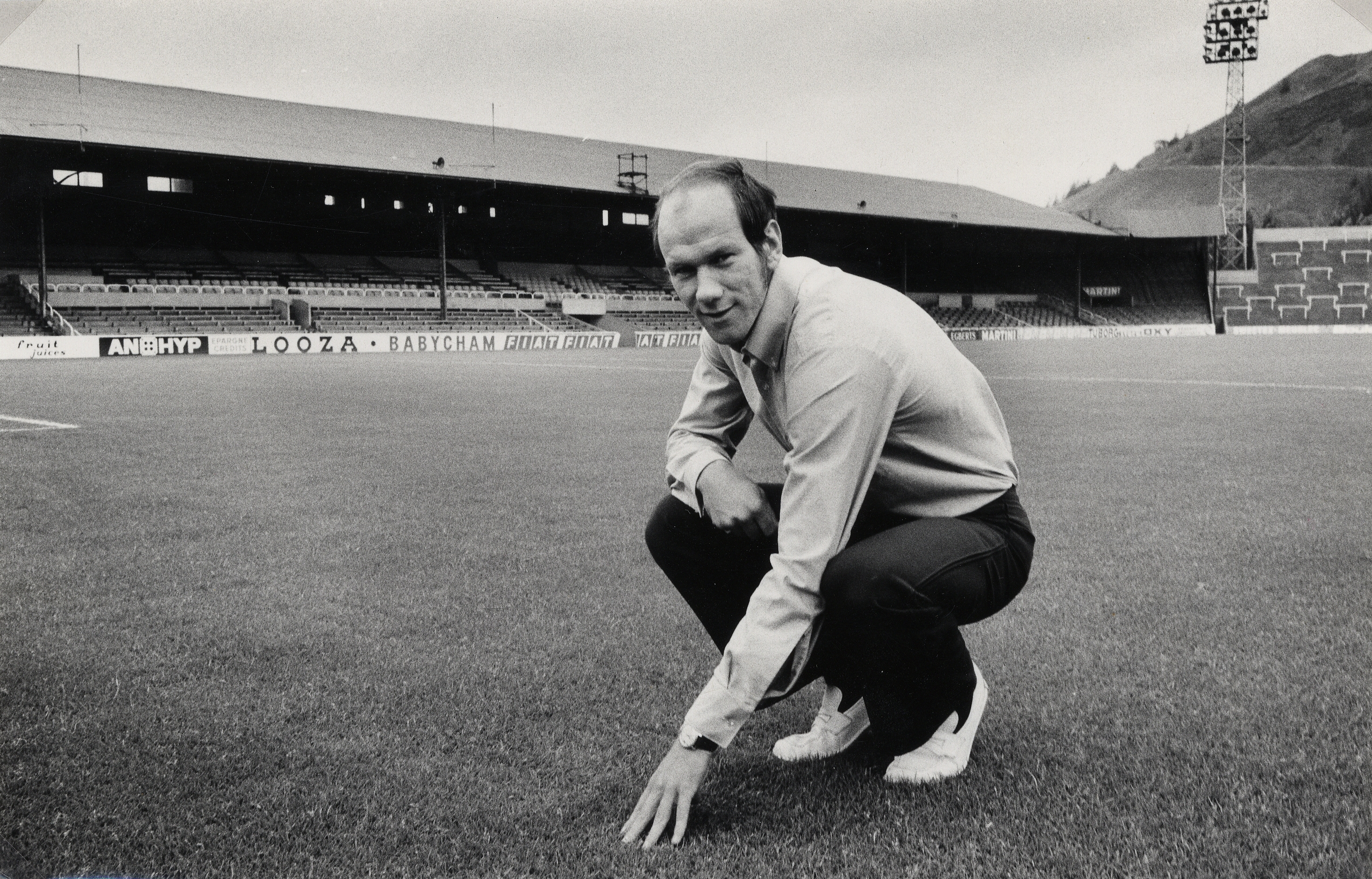
Tommy Svensson touches grass in 1971.

Leif Tommy Svensson (born 4 March 1945) is a Swedish former football manager and player. He is best known for playing for Östers IF and the Sweden men's national football team. He won the Guldbollen in 1969. He managed Sweden between 1991 and 1997 and led them to a bronze medal at the 1994 FIFA World Cup.

He is the son of Stig Svensson and the uncle of Joachim Björklund.

== Early years ==
Svensson was born on 4 March 1945 to Stig Svensson. Stig was a footballer who played for Östers IF and was dubbed Mr. Öster.

Svensson, like his father, had a natural talent for football. At just eleven years-old, he debuted for Östers youth team, and allegedly scored eight goals in the match. However, newspaper headlines said he was too weak. Tommy bought a barbell and trained. Morning, noon and night, he lifted weights in order to bulk up.

== Playing career ==
Svensson's playing career took him to Östers IF as well as Belgian Standard Liège. Throughout his career, he suffered from knee injuries. His injuries almost stopped him from competing in 1968. However, Svensson persevered. He was awarded Guldbollen in 1969 and played at the 1970 FIFA World Cup.

== Managing career ==
After retiring, Svensson started working as the Östers IF team manager while Lars "Laban" Arnesson was the coach. He later had a successful period with Tromsø IL, and became national team coach in 1991.

He led the Sweden national team to the 1992 European Football Championship semi final as well as a bronze medal at the 1994 FIFA World Cup. He resigned in 1997 after failing to qualify for UEFA Euro 1996 and 1998 FIFA World Cup, and later worked in television with match commentary as well as coaching Tromsø for a second period in 2001.

== Honours ==
=== Player ===
Östers IF

- Allsvenskan: 1968

Individual

- Guldbollen: 1969
- Stor Grabb: 1969

=== Manager ===
Öster

- Allsvenskan: 1978, 1980, 1981
- Svenska Cupen: 1976–77

Sweden

- FIFA World Cup: Third Place 1994
