= USS Juneau (CL-52) =

Atlanta-class light cruiser

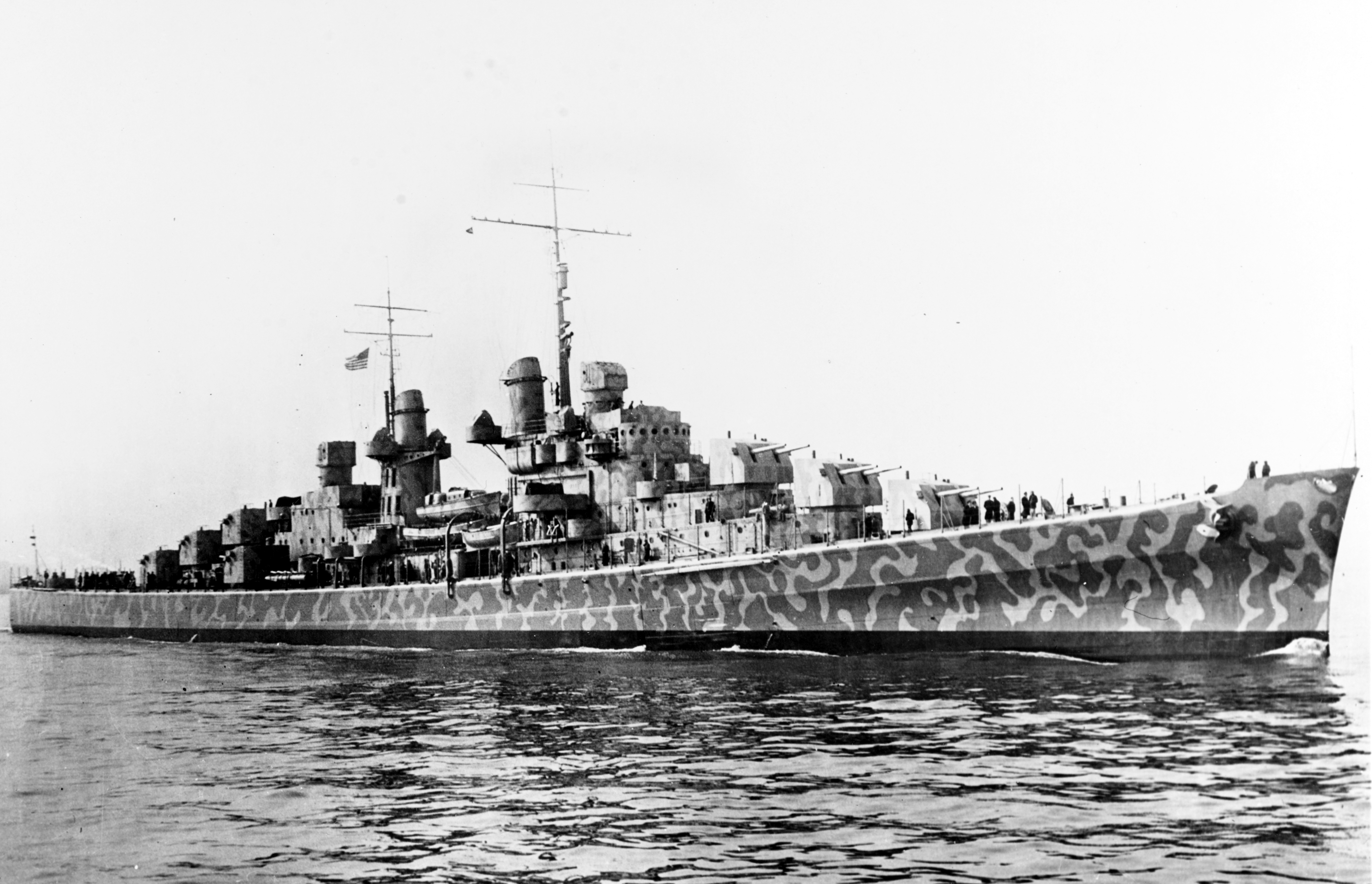
- USS Juneau in February 1942.

History

United States
- Name: Juneau
- Namesake: City of Juneau, Alaska
- Builder: Federal Shipbuilding and Drydock Company, Kearny, New Jersey
- Laid down: 27 May 1940
- Launched: 25 October 1941
- Sponsored by: Mrs. Harry I. Lucas
- Commissioned: 14 February 1942
- Identification: Hull symbol: CL-52
- Honors and awards: 4 × battle stars
- Fate: Torpedoed and sunk during Naval Battle of Guadalcanal on 13 November 1942 Shipwreck found, 17 March 2018
- Notes: Approximate location of sinking: 10°34′S 161°04′E

General characteristics (as built)
- Class & type: Atlanta-class cruiser
- Displacement: 6,718 long tons (6,826 t) (standard); 8,340 long tons (8,474 t) (max)
- Length: 541 ft 6 in (165.05 m) oa
- Beam: 53 ft (16 m)
- Draft: 20 ft 6 in (6.25 m) (mean); 26 ft 6 in (8.08 m) (max)
- Installed power: 4 × Steam boilers; 75,000 shp (56,000 kW)
- Propulsion: 2 × geared turbines; 2 × screws
- Speed: 32.5 kn (37.4 mph; 60.2 km/h)
- Complement: 673 officers and sailors
- Armament: 16 × 5 in (127 mm)/38 caliber Mark 12 guns (8×2); 16 × 1.1 in (28 mm)/75 anti-aircraft guns (4×4); 8 × single 20 mm (0.79 in) Oerlikon anti-aircraft cannons; 8 × 21 in (533 mm) torpedo tubes; 6 × depth charge projectors; 2 × depth charge tracks
- Armor: Belt: 1.1–3 3/4 in (28–95 mm); Deck: 1 1/4 in (32 mm); Turrets: 1 1/4 in (32 mm); Conning Tower: 2 1/2 in (64 mm)

USS Juneau (CL-52) was a United States Navy Atlanta-class light cruiser torpedoed and sunk at the Naval Battle of Guadalcanal on 13 November 1942. In total, 687 officers and sailors, including the five Sullivan brothers, were killed in action as a result of her sinking. Only 10 survivors were rescued after eight days in the water. To honor the five Sullivan brothers and Juneau, the U.S. Navy has since commissioned two ships named USS The Sullivans and two ships named USS Juneau. On 17 March 2018, Paul Allen's research crew on board RV Petrel located the wreck of Juneau at a depth of about 4,200 m (13,800 ft) off the Solomon Islands.

== Construction and commissioning ==
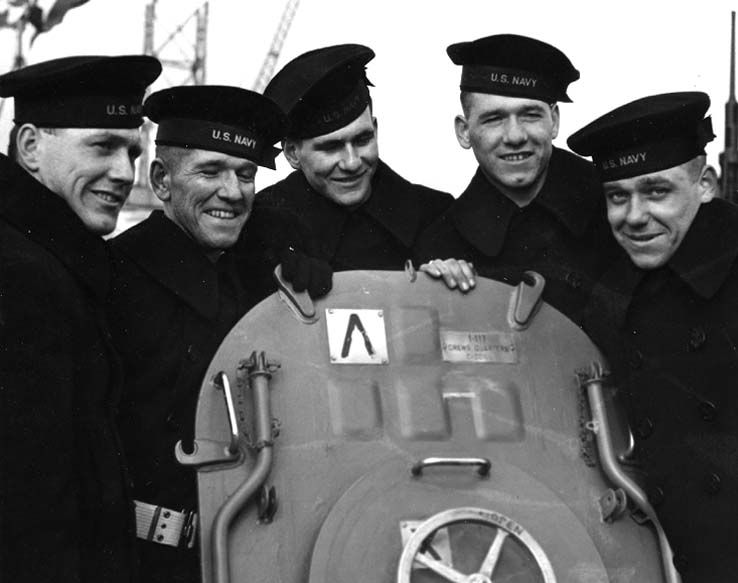
The Sullivan brothers on board the Juneau on her commissioning date. From left to right: Joseph, Francis, Albert, Madison, and George Sullivan

Juneau was laid down by Federal Shipbuilding Company at Kearny, New Jersey, on 27 May 1940. She was launched on 25 October 1941, sponsored by Mrs. Harry I. Lucas, wife of the mayor of the city of Juneau, Alaska, and commissioned on 14 February 1942, with Captain Lyman K. Swenson in command.

== Service history ==
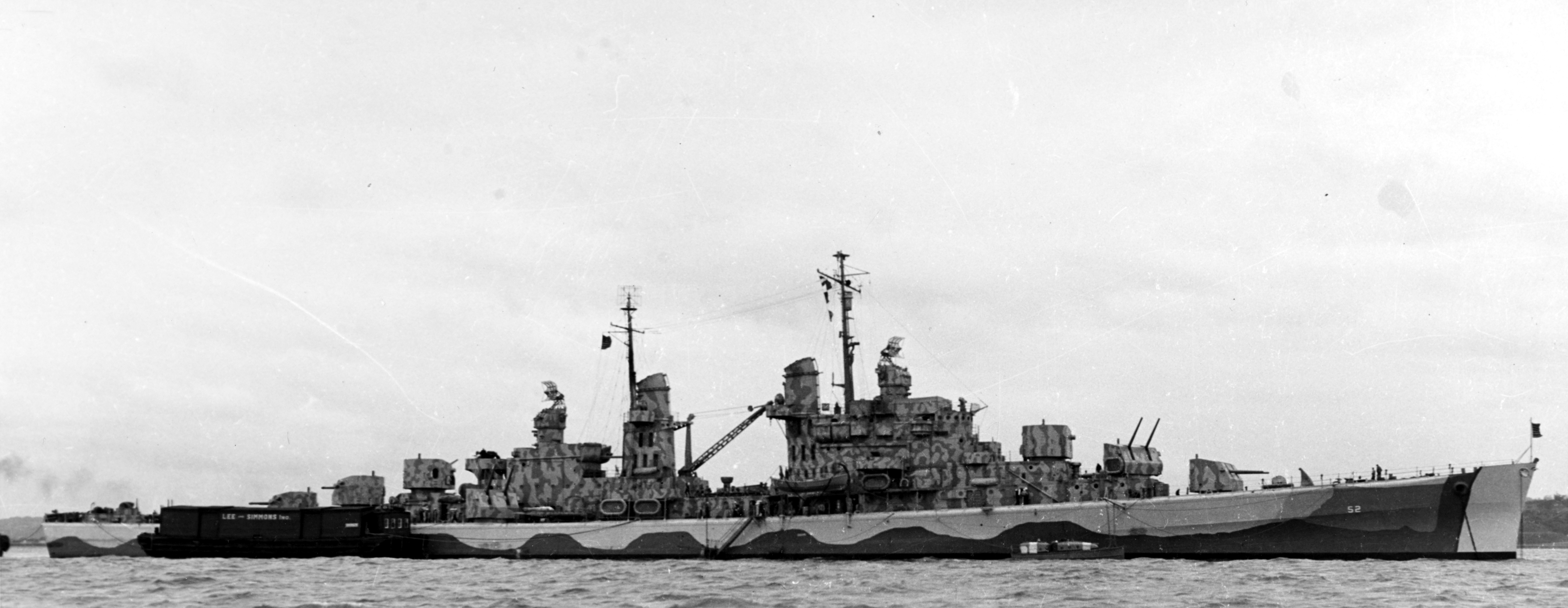
USS Juneau in June 1942

After a hurried shakedown cruise along the Atlantic coast in the spring of 1942, Juneau assumed blockade patrol in early May off the islands of Martinique and Guadeloupe to prevent the escape of Vichy French naval units. She returned to New York to complete alterations and operated in the North Atlantic and Caribbean from 1 June to 12 August on patrol and escort duties. The cruiser departed for the Pacific theater on 22 August.

=== Pacific theater ===
After stopping briefly at the Tonga Islands and New Caledonia, she rendezvoused on 10 September with Task Force 18 (TF 18) under the command of Rear Admiral Leigh Noyes, flying his flag on Wasp. The following day, TF 17, which included Hornet, combined with Admiral Noyes' unit to form TF 61, whose mission was to ferry fighter aircraft to Guadalcanal. On 15 September, Wasp took three torpedo hits from the Japanese submarine I-19, and, with fires raging out of control, was sunk at 21:00 by Lansdowne. Juneau and screen destroyers rescued 1,910 survivors of Wasp and returned them to Espiritu Santo, New Hebrides, on 16 September. The next day, the fast cruiser rejoined TF 17. Operating with the Hornet group, she supported three actions that repelled enemy thrusts at Guadalcanal: the Buin-Faisi-Tonolai Raid; the Battle of the Santa Cruz Islands; and the Naval Battle of Guadalcanal (Third Savo).

=== Battle of the Santa Cruz Islands ===
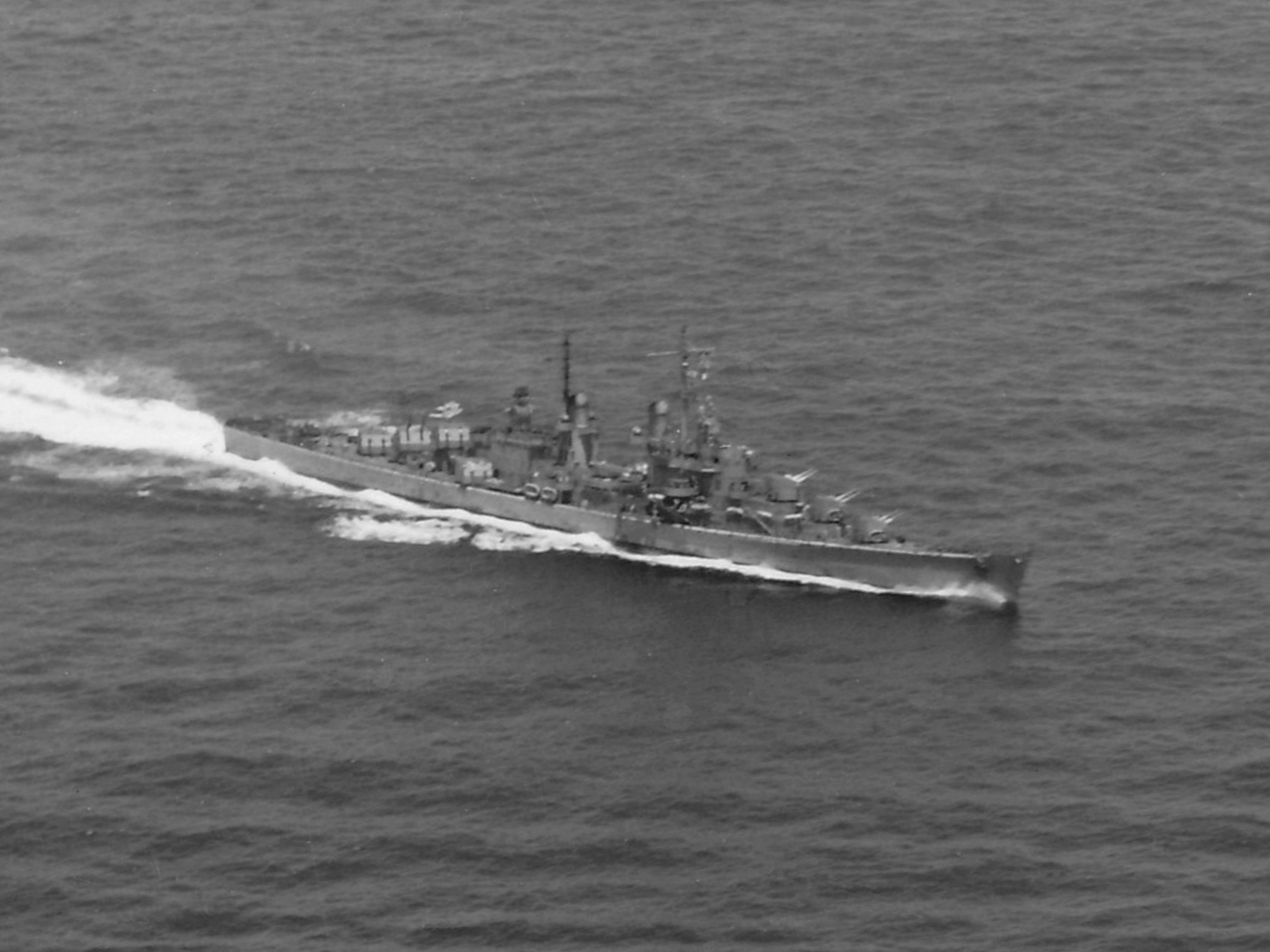
Juneau underway during the Battle of the Santa Cruz Islands, 26 October 1942

The ship's first major action was the Battle of the Santa Cruz Islands on 26 October. On 24 October, Hornet's task force had combined with Enterprise's group to reform TF 61 under the command of Rear Admiral Thomas C. Kinkaid. This force positioned itself north of the Santa Cruz Islands to intercept enemy units that might attempt to close Guadalcanal. Meanwhile, on Guadalcanal, the Japanese achieved a breakthrough during the Battle for Henderson Field on the night of 25 October. That success evidently was a signal for Japanese ships to approach the island.

Early on the morning of 26 October, U.S. carrier planes spotted the Japanese force and immediately attacked it, damaging two carriers (CVL Zuihō and CV Shōkaku), one heavy cruiser (CA Chikuma) and two destroyers, but while American aircraft were locating and engaging the enemy, American ships were also under fire. Shortly after 10:00, some 27 enemy aircraft attacked Hornet. Though Juneau and other screen ships threw up an effective anti-aircraft (AA) barrage which shot down about 20 of the attackers, Hornet was badly damaged and sank the next day. Just before noon, Juneau left Hornet's escort for the beleaguered Enterprise group several miles away. Juneau helped repel four Japanese attacks that lost 18 planes.

That evening, the American forces retired to the southeast. Although the battle had been costly, it had, combined with the Marine victory on Guadalcanal, turned back the attempted Japanese parry in the Solomons. Furthermore, the damaging of two Japanese carriers sharply reduced their air power in the subsequent battle of Guadalcanal.

=== Naval Battle of Guadalcanal ===
On 8 November, Juneau departed Nouméa, New Caledonia, as a unit of TF 67 under the command of Rear Admiral Richmond K. Turner to escort reinforcements to Guadalcanal. The force arrived there early morning on 12 November, and Juneau took up her station in the protective screen around the transports and cargo vessels. Unloading proceeded unmolested until 14:05, when 30 Japanese planes attacked the alerted United States group. The AA fire was effective, and Juneau alone accounted for six enemy torpedo bombers shot down. The few remaining Japanese planes were, in turn, attacked by American fighters; only one bomber escaped. Later in the day, an American attack group of cruisers and destroyers cleared Guadalcanal on reports that a large enemy surface force was headed for the island. At 01:48 on 13 November, Rear Admiral Daniel J. Callaghan's relatively small landing support group engaged the enemy. The Japanese force consisted of two battleships, one light cruiser, and nine destroyers.

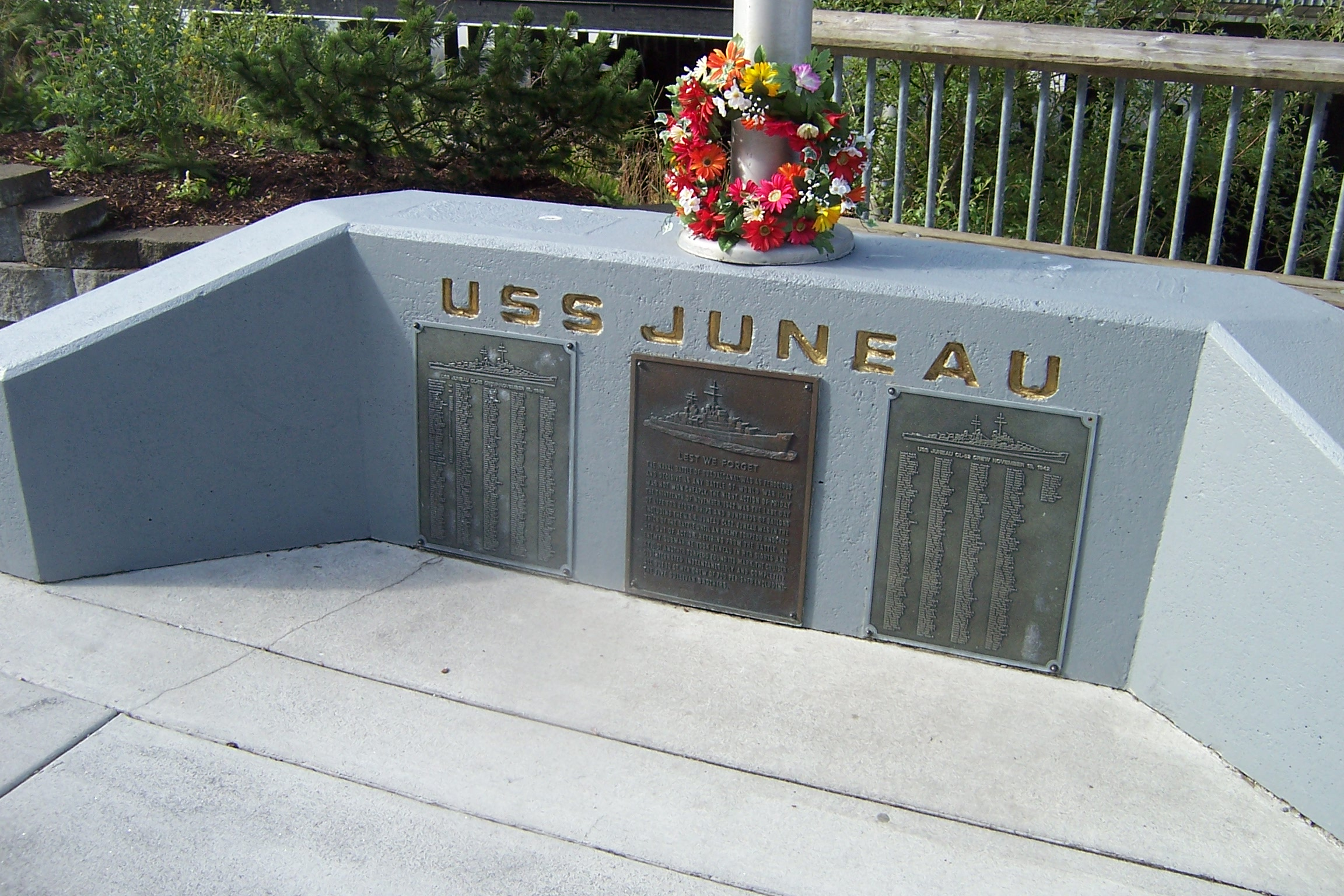
The 1987 memorial to USS Juneau, placed along the cruise ship docks in Juneau, Alaska, as seen in 2009

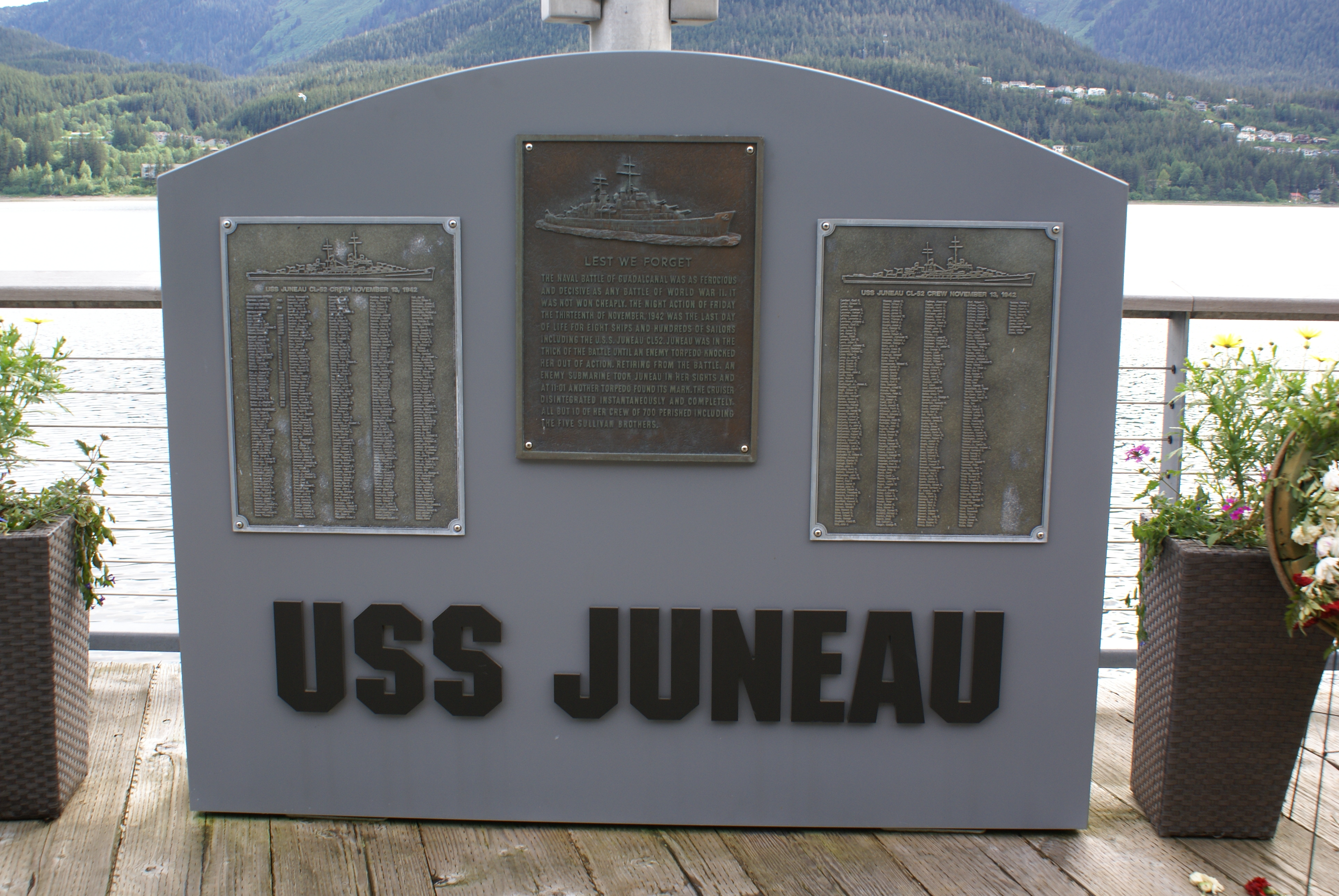
The revised and relocated 2012 memorial on the waterfront in Juneau, as seen in 2017

Because of bad weather and confused communications, the battle occurred in near-pitch darkness and at almost point-blank range, as the ships of the two sides became intermingled. During the melee, Juneau was struck on the port side by a torpedo launched by Japanese destroyer Amatsukaze, causing a severe list, and necessitating withdrawal. Before noon on 13 November, Juneau, along with two other cruisers damaged in the battle—Helena and San Francisco—headed toward Espiritu Santo for repairs. Juneau was steaming on one screw, keeping station 800 yd (730 m) off the starboard quarter of the likewise severely damaged San Francisco. She was down 12 feet (3.7 m) by the bow, but able to maintain 13 kn (15 mph, 24 km/h).

A few minutes after 11:00, two torpedoes were launched from Japanese submarine I-26. These were intended for San Francisco, but both passed ahead of her. One struck Juneau in the same place that had been hit during the battle. There was a great explosion; Juneau broke in two and disappeared in just 20 seconds. Fearing more attacks from I-26, and wrongly assuming from the massive explosion that there were no survivors, Helena and San Francisco departed without attempting to rescue any survivors. In fact, more than 100 sailors had survived the sinking of Juneau. They were left to fend for themselves in the open ocean for eight days before rescue aircraft belatedly arrived. While awaiting rescue, all but 10 died from the elements and shark attacks. Among those lost were the five Sullivan brothers. Two of the brothers apparently survived the sinking only to die in the water; two presumably went down with the ship. Some reports indicate the fifth brother also survived the sinking, but disappeared during the first night when he left a raft and got into the water. On 20 November 1942, USS Ballard recovered two of the ten survivors. Five more in a raft were rescued by a PBY Seaplane 5 miles (8.0 km) away. Three others, including a badly wounded officer, made it to San Cristobal (now Makira) Island, about 55 miles (89 km) away from the sinking. One of the survivors recovered by Ballard said he had been with one of the Sullivan brothers for several days after the sinking.

== Wreck ==
The wreck of Juneau was located on 17 March 2018 by Paul Allen's research crew on board RV Petrel. The cruiser rests 4,200 m (13,800 ft) below the surface off the Solomon Islands in several large pieces.

== Awards ==
Juneau received four battle stars for her service in World War II.

== Legacy ==
In November 2013, Building 77 at the former federal shipyard in Kearny, New Jersey was renamed the USS Juneau Memorial Center, and now houses Hudson County's Office of Emergency Management.

== See also ==
- List by death toll of ships sunk by submarines
- List of U.S. Navy losses in World War II, for other Navy ships lost in World War II
- USS Indianapolis (CA-35), another U.S. Navy cruiser sunk during World War II with substantial loss of life attributed to delayed rescue efforts
- USS The Sullivans (DD-537), a U.S. Navy destroyer named in honor of the Sullivan brothers
