= Viktor Svensson =

Swedish footballer

Personal information
- Full name: Viktor Svensson
- Date of birth: 6 March 1990 (age 36)
- Place of birth: Ystad, Sweden
- Height: 1.93 m (6 ft 4 in)
- Position: Defender

Youth career
- Öja FF

Senior career*
Years	Team	Apps	(Gls)
2009–2012	Trelleborgs FF	45	(0)
2013–2014	Lunds BK	48	(3)
2015–2018	Landskrona BoIS	90	(2)
- * Club domestic league appearances and goals as of 17 September 2018

Viktor Svensson (born 6 March 1990) is a Swedish retired footballer.

He last played for Landskrona BoIS as a defender.
