= Wallby =

Swedish manor house and estate

Coordinates: 57°21′39″N 15°22′32″E

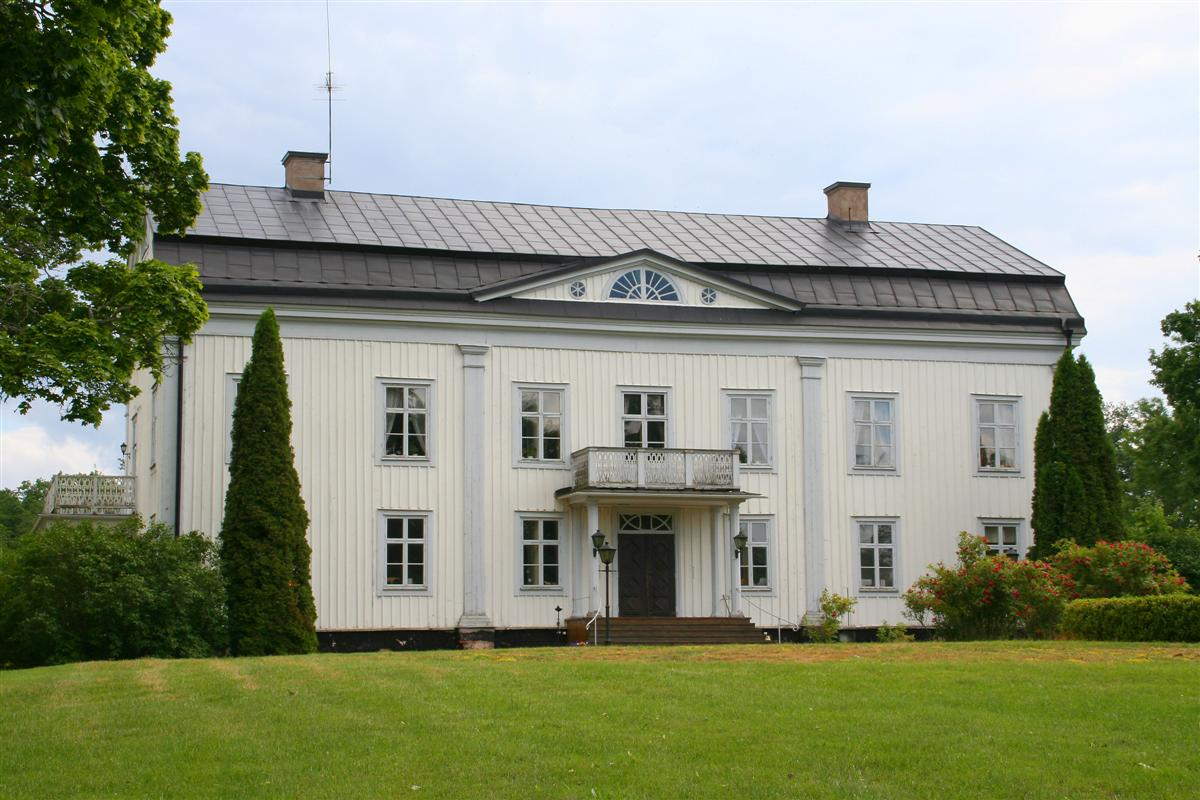
Wallby manor house

Wallby estate is situated on the outskirts of the village of Skirö in Vetlanda Municipality in Småland, Sweden. The main building was built around 1840.
