= Peter Svensson (handballer) =

Danish handball player (born 1983)

Personal information
- Full name: Peter Svensson
- Nationality: Danish (Denmark)
- Born: December 28, 1983 (age 42)
- Height: 195 cm (77 in)

Sport
- Sport: Handball
- Position: Line player
- Current club: Retired
- Number: 5

Senior clubs
- Years: Team
- -2010: GOG
- 2010: BSH

Teams managed
- 2/2011-10/2011: TMS Ringsted
- 2012-?: Holte IF

Peter Svensson (born December 28, 1983) is a Danish former handballer. He played for Danish Handball League side GOG Svendborg, with whom he won the Danish Championship in 2007 and for Bjerringbro-Silkeborg. He ended his playing career in 2010 following a knee injury at the age of 26.

In January 2011 he became the assistant coach at TMS Ringsted, and only a month later he became the head coach. He was fired from this position after only 15 matches due to bad results. In 2012 he became the head coach of the second tier team Holte IF.
