= David Svensson (footballer, born 1993) =

Swedish footballer

Personal information
- Full name: David Robert Svensson
- Date of birth: 4 August 1993 (age 33)
- Place of birth: Sweden
- Height: 1.75 m (5 ft 9 in)
- Position: Midfielder

Team information
- Current team: Eskilsminne IF

Youth career
- –2007: Ödåkra IF
- 2008–2012: Helsingborgs IF

Senior career*
Years	Team	Apps	(Gls)
2011–2014	Helsingborgs IF	6	(0)
2015	Motala AIF	25	(1)
2016–2017	Husqvarna FF	35	(1)
2018–	Eskilsminne IF	0	(0)
- * Club domestic league appearances and goals as of 13 March 2017 (UTC)

David Svensson (born 4 August 1993) is a Swedish footballer who plays for Eskilsminne IF as a midfielder.
