= Gun Svensson =

Swedish politician (born 1937)

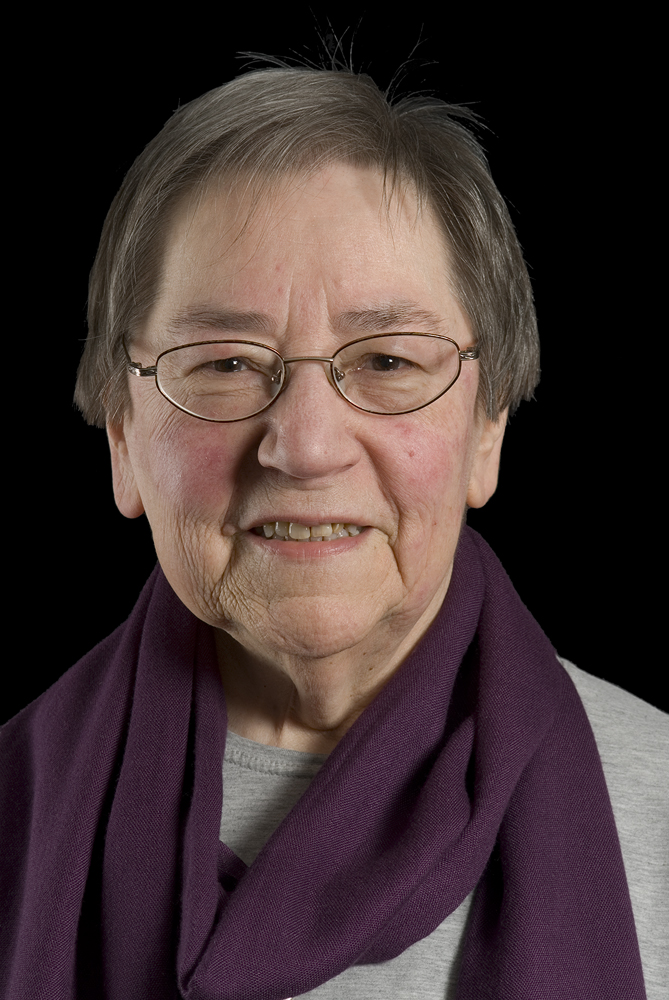
Gun Svensson

Gun Brynhild Svensson (née Nilsson; born 10 July 1937) is a Swedish politician and blogger. She was born in Stensele and is a Pirate Party member and blogs under the name Farmor Gun i Norrtälje. In 2009, she won "Stora bloggpriset" in the category Politics and Society. And in the 2010 Swedish General elections she was a candidate for the Riksdagen for the Pirate Party.

Svensson was a member of the Social Democrats until 1986 when she decided to leave the party. In 2006, she decided to start a blog, mostly about news and politics, and it also coincided with her new interest in human rights and the internet.
