= Anwan Glover =

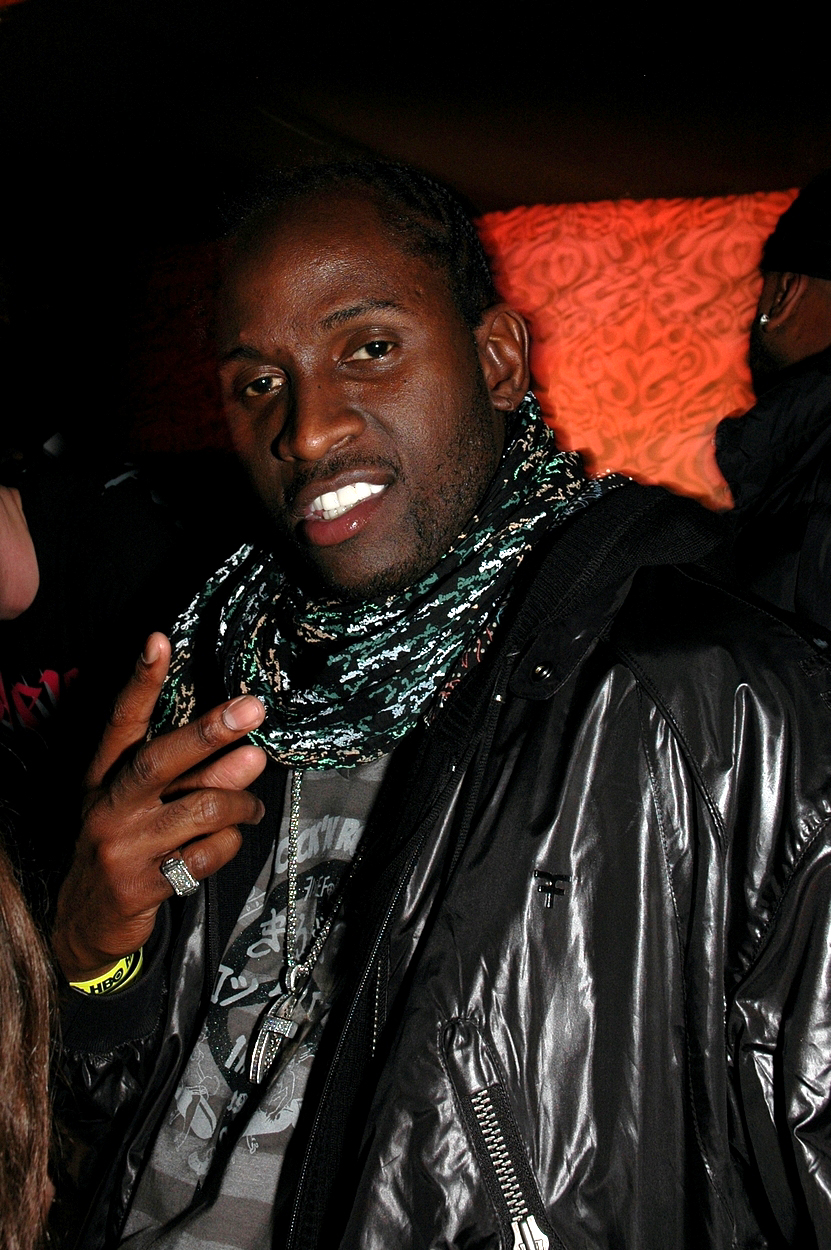
- Glover at Le Royale nightclub in New York City

Background information
- Also known as: Big G; Genghis Glover; Lil NUTS; Big Genghis; Genghis; The Ghetto Prince
- Born: Ralph Anwan Glover; May 5, 1971 (age 55)
- Origin: Washington, D.C. United States
- Genres: Go-go
- Occupations: Musician; actor; model; disc jockey
- Instrument: Vocals
- Years active: 1988–present
- Label: Future Records

Ralph Anwan Glover (born May 5, 1971) is an American rapper, actor, model, DJ, and founding member of the D.C.-based go-go band "BackYard Band" (also abbreviated as "BYB"). Glover is also known for his portrayal of Slim Charles in the HBO crime-drama television series The Wire.

== Career ==
Glover first gained local fame as a teenager in 1992 (some sources say 1988) as one of the founding members of the BackYard Band. He is described as the leader of the band, and credited as its "lead talker." The band got its start, according to its website, "beating on buckets." Glover stated that the band members learned much of their craft from go-go godfather Chuck Brown, who mentored them when they started out. The band still regularly performs in the D.C. area, has toured East Coast locations including New York, Atlanta, New Orleans, and Miami, and has released five albums; one, Hood Related, debuted at number 69 on the Billboard Magazine R&B albums chart on November 22, 1997. In February and March 2018, the band toured Ghana, bringing D.C.'s go-go music back to Africa. Explaining the band's longevity, Glover said, "Most important, we realized early on that we had a special kind of chemistry — we liked it and our fans like it — and we refused to mess with it. Other bands chose to switch members in and out but that only messed with the sound and the vibe."

Glover made his acting debut in late 2003 as Slim Charles in the HBO television series The Wire. He has also appeared in music videos, such as Boyz n da Hood's "Dem Boyz" and Wale's "Chillin", among others. He hosted a nightly radio show on 93.9 WKYS-FM radio in the Washington metropolitan area.

Glover starred in three episodes of the first season of the HBO television series Treme as a convicted killer named Keevon White. He also speaks to youth in the Washington metropolitan region, and has been accepted in the New York Film Academy. He has been working on a film titled Shoedog since 2009. It is written by author and The Wire contributor George Pelecanos.

== Personal life ==
Glover reportedly (in 2016) had six children, and a wife whose name he had not made public.

On August 26, 2007, Glover's brother Tayon was shot to death in Columbia Heights. Glover addressed the press, along with D.C. mayor Adrian Fenty, saying that "we're tired of seeing the yellow [police] tape" and calling for an end to revenge shootings. He also stated that he has been shot 13 times.

On August 3, 2014, Glover was beaten and stabbed at a nightclub in downtown Washington, D.C. The injuries were non-life-threatening.

In August 2022, Glover's 29-year-old son Kavon Glover was killed in a shooting in Upper Marlboro, Maryland.

== Awards and recognition ==
Glover received an NAACP Youth Leadership Award in 2004. He received the key to the city for Washington, D.C., on November 20, 2007, which was proclaimed Anwan Glover Day. He was recognized by a "DMV Honors Anwan Glover" event at Washington's Howard Theatre on January 18, 2014. He has been named an outstanding spokesman to youth for HIV/AIDS awareness.

== Discography ==
=== Albums ===
- We Like it Raw (with the BackYard Band, 1995)
- Hood Related (with the BackYard Band, 1997)
- Skillet (with the BackYard Band, 1999)
- Street Antidote (with the BackYard Band, 2016)
- Triple Threat

=== Singles ===
- The Dippa (2001)
- Hello (2015)

== Filmography ==
=== Films ===
- DC Noir (2019)
- Prospect (2018)
- 179th Street (announced) (2017)
- Desiree (2015)
- Jamesy Boy (2014)
- 12 Years a Slave (2013)
- LUV (2012)
- Dead Money (2012)
- Misunderstandings (2009)
- Divided City (2003)

=== Television ===
- We Own This City (2022) - David Baker EP1 Black Driver
- The Deuce (2017-2019)
- Scream Queens (2015)
- Unsung (2015)
- 68 Square Miles (documentary) (2014)
- Elementary (2013)
- Treme (2010)
- Ugly Betty (TV series) (2009)
- American Gangster (2008)
- Law & Order: Special Victims Unit (2007)
- The Wire (2004-2008)

== See also ==
- Anthony Harley
