= Multi-Facial =

1995 American short film by Vin Diesel

- DVD cover
- Directed by: Vin Diesel
- Written by: Vin Diesel
- Produced by: Vin Diesel
- Starring: Vin Diesel
- Cinematography: Ted Sappington
- Music by: Vin Diesel
- Release dates: July 1995; August 17, 1999 (DVD)
- Running time: 21 minutes
- Country: United States
- Language: English
- Budget: $3,000

Multi-Facial is a 1995 American short drama film written, directed, produced, and scored by Vin Diesel, who also stars as a multiracial actor facing various professional and emotional issues. The film is notable for essentially launching Diesel's career as it was noticed by Steven Spielberg, who then watched Diesel's film Strays, which prompted him to give Diesel his first big break by writing a small role specifically for him in Saving Private Ryan (1998).

== Plot ==
Mike, a struggling actor with a tattooed arm, auditions for an Italian-American role. He delivers an explicit anecdote in a New York Italian accent about getting into a fight with another man in a restaurant for looking at his girlfriend, discovering the man was gay and thus directing his rage at his own girlfriend, beating her up, and feeling surprised that she doesn't call him anymore. The casting director expresses interest and has Mike speak Italian before telling him they'll get back to him. When the director asks Mike where the monologue came from, he says it is a true story that happened to a friend. Mike later calls his manager and complains about the monologue, which was not a true story, saying it was offensive and worrying that it will keep him from getting the role. He wipes the fake tattoo off his arm and goes to his next audition.

Mike meets a black actor in the waiting room of an audition for a commercial, and tells him about the audition he just left, again complaining that he thought his monologue was offensive. The actor tells Mike he has just landed a role in an international commercial, but Mike says he refuses to do commercials because no great actors ever did them. Before he can audition, the director tells Mike that his skin is "a little too light" and not to bother auditioning. He suggests Mike audition for a Spanish role in a soap opera instead.

Mike goes to another audition and reads with a Cuban accent alongside a Hispanic actress. The two of them are portraying an argument, but when the actress launches into Spanish, Mike is unable to continue. As they leave the audition, the actress calls out Mike for pretending to speak Spanish but still suggests that he try out for a soap opera which is looking for Hispanic actors; Mike says he refuses to do soap operas because no great actors ever did them. He attends another audition, where his scene partner tells him that she really thinks he could do well. Mike does the reading with her in a heavy urban accent, but the casting directors cut the audition short because they are looking for more of a "Wesley type".

Mike moves on to another audition, where they are expecting him from a previous audition. The casting director sees on Mike's résumé that he can rap, prompting Mike to launch into a hip-hop routine. He then sits down and delivers a monologue about being a young man watching his father on stage in a performance of Raisin in the Sun. During his father's performance, he came to believe that his father wanted him to be a great black actor; after his father died, he realized that his father wanted him to be a great actor regardless of his skin color. The casting director is impressed, but admits that they are supposed to be casting an actor with dreadlocks, and Mike leaves with a promise that they will contact him if they are able to cast him instead.

Later, Mike sits in silent anger at a diner. He overhears an actress talking to another man about how frustrated she is to be typecast as a blonde bimbo. When the waitress comes, the actress orders coffee that's "not too light, not too dark". Mike chuckles to himself and mouths the words "not too light, not too dark".

== Production ==
Multi-Facial was written, directed, produced, and scored by Vin Diesel. The film is semi-autobiographical, drawing on Diesel's own frustration trying to find work as an actor of mixed ethnicity. In the early 1990s, Diesel returned from Los Angeles to New York, frustrated with his failures in Hollywood. His mother gave him a copy of Feature Films at Used Car Prices, a book about producing low-budget films, which he later called "truly empowering" and said that it motivated him to make his own movies.

Diesel wrote a script for a feature film called Strays, but was unable to secure financing for it due to being unknown. He decided to produce a short film instead and wrote the script for Multi-Facial in one night. He shot it over the course of three days for $3,000. He also scored the film, but became disillusioned by the response to it and stopped working on it during the editing stage. With encouragement from his stepfather, he finished the final edit and screened it at the Anthology Film Archives in Manhattan. He received a strong response, and the film was accepted for the 1995 Cannes Film Festival, where it was screened to standing-room only crowds.

== Impact on Diesel's career ==
At age 27, Diesel "would drive around [Los Angeles] with VHS copies of [the film] in the trunk just in case [he] bumped into someone who could help [him] with [his] dreams". Upon seeing Morgan Freeman outside a Four Seasons hotel, he approached Freeman and handed him a copy of the film. In 1997, Steven Spielberg saw Strays (having already been impressed with Diesel's performance in Multi-Facial) and wrote a role into Saving Private Ryan specifically for Diesel as a result, giving him his first major film role.
