= Bugged! =

- DVD cover for 'Bugged!'
- Directed by: Ronald K. Armstrong
- Written by: Ronald K. Armstrong
- Produced by: Gay Abel-Bey; Ronald K. Armstrong
- Starring: Priscilla K. Basque; Ronald K. Armstrong; Jeff Lee; Karina Felix; Al Woodley
- Cinematography: S. Torriano Berry
- Edited by: Ronald K. Armstrong
- Music by: Boris Elkis
- Distributed by: Troma Entertainment
- Release date: 1997
- Running time: 82 minutes
- Language: English

Bugged! is a 1997 black horror comedy film written and directed by Ronald K. Armstrong and distributed by Troma Entertainment. It features an all-black cast.

== Plot ==
The film tells the story of a group of bumbling exterminators who are called over to the house of an attractive young novelist to rid her house of insects. Unfortunately, due to a horrible chemical mix-up, the poison spray causes the bugs to grow to enormous sizes, and pretty soon everyone is trapped inside the house and have to find a way to stop the dastardly pests before they start multiplying and take over the world.

=== Tagline ===
"They're urban, they're vermin, and THEY exterminate YOU!"
