= Exit Strategy (film) =

- Theatrical release poster
- Directed by: Michael Whitton
- Screenplay by: Jameel Saleem
- Based on: Characters by Jameel Saleem; Kimelia Weathers; Rick Fontaine; Mustafa Harris; Reign Morton
- Produced by: Kellie Maltagliati; Quincy "QDeezy" Harris
- Starring: Jameel Saleem; Kimelia Weathers; Quincy "QDeezy" Harris; Big Boy; Kevin Hart
- Cinematography: Joseph Crist
- Edited by: Michael Whitton
- Music by: Simon A. Stevens
- Production companies: Ask Around Productions; Ida's Son Productions
- Distributed by: Ask Around Entertainment
- Release date: February 10, 2012
- Running time: 76 minutes
- Country: United States
- Language: English

Exit Strategy is a 2012 American independent romantic comedy film directed by Michael Whitton and starring Jameel Saleem, Kimelia Weathers, Quincy "QDeezy" Harris, with cameo appearances by L.A. radio host Big Boy and stand-up comedian Kevin Hart. Saleem plays a man whose main goal is to not get the girl, but to lose her. The film originated as a seven-part web series that began running in 2007.

== Plot ==
James moves in with Kim, his girlfriend of three months, and quickly discovers they are not compatible. With advice from his childhood best friends and second-hand goods store co-workers Carville and Leona, he tries to make the relationship work, but Kim's domineering nature makes this impossible. James then tries to get her to break up with him but still let him sleep on the couch. Eventually, James tells Kim the painful truth, making her realize he wasn't what she wanted after all.

== Cast ==
(in order of appearance)

- Jameel Saleem as James, co-owner of a second-hand goods store (Stuff Shop).
- Quincy "Qdeezy" Harris as Carville, James' childhood best friend and Stuff Shop co-owner.
- Noelle Balfour as Leona, James' childhood best friend and co-worker.
- Kimelia Weathers as Kim, James' girlfriend.
- Big Boy as himself, radio host of Big Boy's Neighborhood.
- Liz Hernandez as herself, radio co-host of Big Boy's Neighborhood.
- Fuzzy Fantabulous as himself, radio co-host of Big Boy's Neighborhood.
- Rick Amieva as Radio Caller.
- Jenna Willis as Tanny, Kim's friend.
- Danette Wilson as Shauna, Kim's friend.
- Jennah Hughes-Taylor as Young Woman, Young Man's fiancé.
- Juhahn Jones as Young Man, Young Woman's husband-to-be.
- Jonny Whitton as Shopper.
- Kevin Hart as Mannequin Head Man, a Stuff Shop customer.
- Nick Sinise as Scoop, a high-schooler and Stuff Shop regular.
- Marina Steele as Sandy, a woman wanting to pawn her wedding ring.
- Sid Burston as Mr. "Sweet", Kim's father.
- Matt Kawczynski as Rodney, Tanny's boyfriend.
- Carlos Javier Castillo as Jay, Shauna's boyfriend.
- Misty Alli as Yinny, Scoop's friend.
- Chad Younglove as Jeff, Leona's boyfriend.

== Production ==
Exit Strategy was independently made for under $100,000 by Ask Around Productions in association with Big Boy's Ida's Son Productions. The film was shot on a 5D camera in 14 days, with Whitton taking on much of the laptop-based post-production work.

Kellie Maltagliati, one of the film's producers, credits the ability to make this film on a shoestring budget, and release it, on both cast and crew dedication and the recent technological advancements of digital filming, post-production, exhibition, and marketing.

== Soundtrack ==
Exit Strategy Motion Picture Soundtrack

Soundtrack album by Various Artists
- Released: January 6, 2012
- Genre: Film soundtrack
- Label: Ocean View Entertainment

The official motion picture soundtrack, Music Featured In And Inspired By Exit Strategy, was released on February 6, 2012 by Ocean View Entertainment.

Track listing

No.	Title	Recording artist(s)	Length
1.	"So Fine"	Highway Jackson	3:53
2.	"Rollin'"	Tara Priya	2:51
3.	"Ever After"	Emily King	3:40
4.	"Remote Control"	Cinematic Noise Orchestra	1:00
5.	"The Fool"	Solar Taxi	3:51
6.	"I'll Be the DJ"	Beware Fashionable Women	4:16
7.	"Why Don't You Leave"	Focus! Focus!	2:35
8.	"Com'n Ova"	Julius Holliday	3:51
9.	"OMG WTF"	Kanobby	3:00
10.	"Wounded"	Tara Priya	3:15
11.	"Honeysuckle"	Left Me Bashful	3:01
12.	"Lucky"	Lettie	2:49
13.	"Convenient Fictions"	Beta.Beta	3:13
14.	"Can You Hear Me"	Kendré	5:24
15.	"Exit Strategy Theme"	Simon A. Stevens	1:07

== Release and Reception ==
Exit Strategy received a limited U.S. release on February 10, 2012 in AMC Theatres, then expanded nationwide in Rave Cinemas and Bow-Tie Cinemas on March 9, 2012.

To promote the theatrical opening of the film in Philadelphia, Ask Around Entertainment partnered with Radio One urban format station WPHI-FM to produce significant on-air content focused on the movie's relationship and break-up themes.

The film was made available June 5, 2012 on DVD, VOD, and digital download.

For Black History Month 2014, Google Play listed Exit Strategy on their "Inspiring Stories" list that includes 12 Years A Slave and Lee Daniels' The Butler.

== See also ==
- Exit strategy
- independent film
- No budget film
