= Suzanne Lanza =

American actress and model (born 1965)

- Born: 12 March 1965 (age 60); Los Angeles, California, USA
- Occupation(s): Actress, model
- Years active: 1985–present
- Children: 1

Suzanne Lanza is an American actress and model.

== Biography ==
Lanza was born in Los Angeles, California on March 12, 1965. In acting class, her teacher referred her to an agent at the Wilhelmina Modeling Agency and she began working as a model at the age of 16, right after graduating high school, with a GC shoot by Herbert Ritt. Later in life she graduated from UCLA with degrees in History and Art History. She is the director of Kaleidoscope, a non-profit organization, and Blue Ladybug Social, a social media company. She currently models for Iconic Focus. She adopted a daughter.

She has appeared on the covers of Elle, Marie Claire, Vogue, Cosmopolitan, Glamour, and Harper’s Bazaar. She was a Victoria's Secret model from the late 1980s to the mid-1990s.

Her first television appearance was as co-host of Andy Warhol's Fifteen Minutes show on MTV, in 1987. As an actress Lanza has appeared in Friends, Dexter and Ellen. Her credits include Red Shoe Diaries (1992), Strays (1997) and The Night We Never Met (1993).
