= Trumped (2009 film) =

- Theatrical release poster
- Directed by: Michael Whitton
- Written by: Michael Whitton
- Produced by: Kellie Maltagliati
- Starring: James James; Matt Kawczynski; David Whitton
- Cinematography: Sean Daly
- Edited by: Michael Whitton
- Music by: Michael Whitton
- Production companies: ON3 Films; Ask Around Productions
- Distributed by: 3 Walls Entertainment
- Release date: September 11, 2009
- Running time: 7 minutes
- Country: United States
- Language: English

Trumped is a 2009 American thriller short film written and directed by Michael Whitton and starring James James, Matt Kawczynski, and David Whitton. The film follows the spree of a three-man costumed gang bent on scaring people for fun.

== Premise ==
The film is focused around a demented scare game that the desensitized players: Greg (James), Anthony (Kawczynski), and Tommy (Whitton) think is harmless and the random victims believe is real; but when an accident blurs the two, the players are forced to face a consequence that trumps all the rest.

== Cast ==
(in order of appearance)

- James James as Greg (Blue), a thrill-seeker
- David Whitton as Tommy (Red), Greg's roommate
- Matt Kawczynski as Anthony (Green), Greg's friend by default
- Tamara Gschaider as Mia, young attack victim
- Kathy Corrigan as Ima, old attack victim
- Larry Whitton as Gentleman, Ima's husband
- Jaime Whitton as Girl, a potential attack victim
- Rodney Amieva as Dude, Girl's friend
- Ray Chavez, Jr. as Mello, a hoodie gangster
- Rene Arreola as Once, a hoodie gangster
- David Fernandez as Keso, a hoodie gangster

== Production ==
Trumped was shot in Super 16mm on location in Los Angeles, California.

== Accolades ==
- Winner BEST DRAMA at the 2010 Ivy Film Festival
- Winner BEST SHORT at the 2010 FirstGlance Short Online Contest
- Winner PREMIERE at the FirstGlance Film Fest Philadelphia TwentyTen (Shorts Too)
- SEMI-FINALIST at the 2011 Action/Cut Short Film Competition
- Shortlisted at 2010 Visionfest and the 2011 Independents' Film Festival.

== See also ==
- Aestheticisation of violence
- Adrenaline junkie
- Hooliganism
