= Boris Elkis =

Russian composer

Boris Elkis is a Russian composer. He has studied at the Gnessins music academy.

== Filmography ==
- A Perfect Getaway - original music
- Street Kings - music programmer
- Darfur Now - music programmer
- Days of Wrath - music programmer
- Awake - music programmer And Keyboards
- The Condemned (2007) - music programmer
- What About Your Friends: Weekend Getaway - additional music
- Divided City - original music
- The Godson - original music
- Streetwise - original music
- Bugged - original music
- Æon Flux - music programmer
- Call of Duty 2 (Video game) - music programmer
- Call of Duty 2: The Big Red One (Video game) - music programmer
- Harsh Times - music programmer
- The Fog - music programmer
- Walking Tall - music programmer
- Freddy vs. Jason - music programmer
- Cloud Seven - original music
- Lost - additional music score
- 9-11: American Reflections - Film editing
- The House 2 - original music
