= 9-11: American Reflections =

2001 film by Shireen Kadivar

- Directed by: Shireen Kadivar
- Edited by: Boris Elkis
- Release date: December 20, 2001
- Country: United States
- Language: English

9-11: American Reflections is a 2001 documentary film that examines the attitudes of the American public in the wake of the September 11 attacks in 2001. It is directed by Shireen Kadivar and edited by Boris Elkis. The runtime is 50 minutes.
