= Lettie (musician) =

British musician

Lettie is a British London-based singer, songwriter, and multi-instrumentalist.

== Biography ==
Lettie grew up in Suffolk, England. She is a former history student and avid collector of postcards and ephemera.

Lettie met producer/writer David Baron in 2006 and has made three records with him, Age of Solo and Everyman (2008) and Good Fortune, Bad Weather (2012). The records were primarily recorded and produced at Baron's home studio in Boiceville, New York. All three records have been independently released.

In October 2009, Lettie performed a session at the BBC's Maida Vale Studios as part of 2009's Electric Proms. She performed "Atmosphere", "My Name Is", "Red" and "Hang On", with Mike Mason on Alesis Ion and guitar. During the same month, Lettie embarked on her first European tour, supporting ex-Bauhaus frontman Peter Murphy. Lettie appears as a singer and co-writer on "Counting Waves" on Sarah Fimm's White Birds EP.

Lettie's album produced and written with David Baron, Good Fortune, Bad Weather, makes use of Baron's collection of unusual instruments such as moogs, synths, and arps. The album features the musicianship of Danny Blume, Zachary Alford on drums and Sara Lee, D James Goodwin on guitars, Jeremy Bernstein, and David Baron on synthesizers and everything else. The album received four stars from the Irish Times.

== Radio and television appearances ==
In 2009, Dermot O'Leary picked Lettie for the Electric Proms, and played her track "Hang On" on BBC Radio 2.

Lettie was one of the three featured artists in Rachel Davies' documentary Hello Glastonbury!, which first aired in the UK on BBC Four on 31 August 2010.

Her song "Lucky" was featured in the film Exit Strategy.

In 2014, she released a three track EP called Crossroads with Dave Barbarossa.

== Discography ==
- Everyman (2008)
- Age of Solo (2008)
- Good Fortune, Bad Weather (2012)
- If? (2017)
- Endless Climb (2022)

The first three albums listed were produced by David Baron.
