= Michael Whitton =

American film director

- Occupation: Film director Film editor
- Years active: 2009–present

Michael Whitton is an American film director and film editor based in Los Angeles, California.

Both his feature directorial and picture editorial debut is the independent romantic comedy film Exit Strategy, released in the U.S. in February 2012 and considered by some as one of the most popular comedy feature films released in 2012.

Prior to Exit Strategy, Whitton directed and edited the short film Trumped. He is also involved in the process of filmmaking in various capacities, credited as writer, colorist, sound designer, and graphic designer on his films, which tend to explore the psychocultural themes of control and temptation, more specifically, how and when "the demons set in," or when the emotional and physical demands that people make on themselves and/or others are not met.

As an art director and graphic designer in advertising, Whitton is credited with the packaging and cover artwork featured on many commercial album releases including Immediate Music's Trailerhead series: Saga (2011), Nu Epiq (2014), and Globus' Break From This World (2011).

== Filmography ==
- Seventy-Nine (2014)
- Exit Strategy (2012)
- Trumped (2009)
