= Divided City (film) =

2004 film directed by Bruce Brown

- theatrical release poster
- Directed by: Bruce Brown
- Screenplay by: Bruce Brown
- Produced by: Bruce Brown (exec.)
- Starring: Sheila Hayes; Kimberly Person; Big G
- Edited by: Bruce Brown
- Music by: Boris Elkis
- Release date: June 10, 2004 (San Francisco Black Film Festival)
- Running time: 113 minutes
- Country: United States
- Language: English

Divided City is a 2004 action-crime film written and directed by Bruce Brown, and stars Sheila Hayes, Kimberly Person, Tim Taylor, Raymond Daniels, and Big G. The music is by composer Boris Elkis. The film is a sequel to the 1998 film Streetwise, and it previewed at the San Francisco Black Film Festival on June 10, 2004.

== Cast ==
- Sheila Hayes
- Kimberly Person
- Tim Taylor
- Raymond Daniels
- Big G
- David Jason Orr
- Adrienne Renee Fairley
- Mark Hyde
- Jason Perkins
- Walter Suarez Jr.
- Giovanna Williams

== See also ==
- List of hood films
