= Sid Burston =

American actor

- Born: February 9, 1959 (age 67); Springfield, Massachusetts.
- Other name: Sidney Burston
- Occupations: Actor, Executive Producer, Screenplay, Script writer, Composer, Director, Playwright, Novelist.
- Years active: 1992 to present

Sid Burston is an American actor who has performed in over forty stage plays and fourteen national tours. He has played numerous lead and supporting roles in film and television. Burston release his debut gospel album Get Thee Behind Me in 1997.

== Filmography ==
=== Film ===
- I Am John Brown (????)
- Naptown (pre-production) (2018)
- The Job Interview (2017)
- CainAbel (2017)
- Opus of an Angel (2016)
- Grim Weaver (2016)
- Maul Dogs (2015)
- Miles Away (2015)
- Original Stereotype (2014)
- That Guy: Lost Undercover (2014)
- Alleged Gangster (2013)
- Attack on Maiduguri (2012)
- Exit Strategy (2012)
- Road 2 Damascus (2011)
- Trapped: Haitian Nights (2010)
- JC in tha Hood (2008)
- Eye See Me (2007)
- Reunion (2006)
- Random Acts of Violence (2002)
- Streetwise (1998)

=== Television ===
- The Restaurant (2015)
- Eros.Emmanuel and Me (2012)
- Get Thee Behind Me (2010-2011)
- Poetri-N-Motion (2009)
- Mutiny (1999)
- Columbo (1998)
