= Hood Related =

Studio album by BackYard Band
- Released: October 28, 1997
- Genre: Go-go; hip-hop
- Length: 2:18:38
- Label: Future; Liaison
- Producer: Reo Edwards (exec.); Terrance Cooper

BackYard Band chronology
We Like It Raw (1995)	Hood Related (1997)	Skillet (1999)

Professional ratings
Review scores
Source	Rating
AllMusic	4/5 stars
ARTISTdirect	4/5 stars

Hood Related is a studio album released on October 28, 1997 by the Washington, D.C.–based go-go band BackYard Band.

== Track listing ==
Disc 1

1. "Intro" – 2:36
2. "91 Dope Jam" – 8:58
3. "Gingus Live" – 1:38
4. "Hood Stars" – 4:06
5. "Friday Nite Fish Fry" – 3:22
6. "Cease Fire" – 8:44
7. "Gingus Live" – 1:30
8. "Reggae in the Yard" – 7:01
9. "Ms. Poet" – 1:38
10. "Ill Na Na" – 5:10
11. "Big G and Jas. Funk" – 8:59
12. "Junk in the Trunk" – 13:01
13. "Rock & Roll" – 2:03

Disc 2

1. "Bob and Mike" – 1:07
2. "Pimp Talk 2000" – 2:22
3. "Freestyle" – 12:01
4. "Slow Shit" – 2:26
5. "Definition of Unibomber" – 1:14
6. "Unibomber 97" – 8:33
7. "Back in the Day" – 3:36
8. "We Just Sippin" – 9:30
9. "Gingus Live" – 1:23
10. "Outstanding" – 4:37
11. "Tap, Tap" – 12:09
12. "John Salley" – 6:18
13. "Listen" – 2:19
14. "Black and Gifted" – 2:17

== Personnel ==
Adapted from AllMusic.

- Bruce (Joey from Rock) – producer, vocals
- Bubba (Italian Stallion) – electric guitar
- Carlos (Little Los) – vocals
- Eric – keyboards
- Gingus (Big G) – vocals
- Keith (Hot Sauce) – congas, percussion, rototoms
- Leroy (Unc) – bass guitar
- Mike (Whitehead Mike) – keyboards, producer
- Paul (Buggie) – drums, percussion
- Michelle Precise – vocals
- Stephanie Rhodes – vocals
- Weensey – vocals
