= Streetwise (1998 film) =

1998 film directed by Bruce Brown

- theatrical release poster
- Directed by: Bruce Brown
- Screenplay by: Bruce Brown
- Produced by: Bruce Brown (exec.); Michelle E. Dyer; Paul A. Willis; Byron Woodfork (assoc.)
- Starring: Tim Taylor; Kurt Matthews; Jerry Cummings; D.C. Scorpio; Sidney Burston; Taraji Henson
- Edited by: Bruce Brown; Dion W. Hicks (assist.)
- Music by: Boris Elkis
- Distributed by: Black Film Distributor
- Release date: 1998 (Direct-to-VHS)
- Running time: 90 minutes
- Country: United States
- Language: English
- Budget: $250,000

Streetwise (originally titled as 24/7) is a 1998 hood-action-crime thriller film written and directed by Bruce Brown in his directorial debut, and stars Tim Taylor, Kurt Matthews, Jerry Cummings, D.C. Scorpio and Sidney Burston. Streetwise also stars Taraji P. Henson making her acting debut in a featured film.

The film is set in the Anacostia neighborhood of Southeast, Washington, D.C. during the crack epidemic of the late-1980s and early-1990s. Streetwise follows the lives of three brothers as they pursue different methods trying to make it out of their drug-infested neighborhood that's surrounded by poverty, neglect and drug-related violence. In 2004, a sequel was released, called Divided City.

== Plot ==
Eric Walker along with his oldest brother Donte Walker and their friend Loco are drug dealers who have a small-time operation selling crack on the corners of Talbert Street in their Anacostia neighborhood in Southeast, D.C. On the street corners, they have to worry about muggers such as 11:30, a mentally-deranged stick-up kid who has served time in St. Elizabeths Hospital and who is fascinated with killing street thugs and then hurrying home to watch the aftermath on the 11:30 nightly news.

Eric's youngest brother Michael is different from the older brothers and is more focused on perfecting his skills in hip-hop and go-go music, along with having dreams of receiving a major record deal. Their mother is very protective of Michael and does not want him going in the same direction as his two older brothers (Eric and Donte) who have become entrenched in the extremely violent drug-infested streets, during a time when D.C. was labeled the "Murder Capital of the United States". As a result, she keeps him on a very tight-leash, so overbearing that Michael feels like he is imprisoned.

Tammy is an unmarried single-mother working as a hairdresser at "Hair Quarters", who neglects her young son. Instead, she parties heavily at the clubs and dates drug hustlers promiscuously. She does not believe there are any good men left in the world, and has chosen to live for the moment.

Her mother encourages Tammy to straighten up her life and provide motherly guidance for her son; else she will report her to the Child Protection Services for child neglect. Tammy eventually turns away from the fast-paced chasing-drug hustler's lifestyle and seeks counseling from the Max Robinson Community Center after thinking long about her mother's advice.

Since "streetlife" is what Donte knows best, he wants to leave the 'nickel and dimes' dealings and use his street knowledge to maximize their presence beyond their neighborhood and into other profitable neighborhoods in the city (including Raymond's lucrative territories in Northwest, D.C.) Donte is irritated by outsiders like Raymond, a drug lord who comes into their neighborhood and make millions of dollars selling crack off of their street corners. Donte convinces Eric and Loco that it is time to go big and expand their footprint into Raymond's territory.

In time, Donte has an unexpected run-in at a crack-house with Raymond's girlfriend Tiffany (an all-girl's prep school educated drug-addict). She came looking for cocaine, since Raymond refused to give her any. Donte offers to provide her cocaine in exchange for sex, which she agrees. After sex, Donte tries to get inside information of Raymond's drug operation. Tiffany instead gives up Raymond's daily whereabouts, including the weekly haircuts every Wednesday at 10:00 AM at Charlie's barbershop.

Donte uses the information to attempt an assassination of Raymond. Donte and Loco go to kill Raymond at the barbershop. However, they mistakenly kill the wrong person. Raymond (who was in the backroom witnessing) recognized Donte and immediately plans retaliation for "The Walker Boys". Members of his crew kidnap Michael and bring him to Raymond, where he is executed. This enrages Donte and Eric as they seek vengeance against Raymond, which climaxes into an all-out bloody street war between Donte, Raymond, and other neighborhood rivals.

== Cast ==
(All cast members were credited as "The Players")

- Tim Taylor as Eric Walker
- Kurt Matthews as Donte Walker
- Jerry Cummings as Michael Walker
- D.C. Scorpio as Loco
- Henri Edmonds as Mrs. Walker
- Sidney Burston as Raymond
- Taraji Henson as Tammy
- David Jason Orr as Tom Tom
- Shelia Hayes as Alexandria (Alex)
- Kim Persons as Mercedes
- Janine Shaw as Tiffany
- Shorty B as 11:30
- James "Jas Funk" Thomas as Milt
- Tony Fisher as Big Tony
- DJ Kool as himself (cameo appearances)
- CJ as himself (cameo appearances)
- Paco as himself (cameo appearances)
- Bunny Dorsett as Tammy's mother
- Tony Person as Dice
- Tim Coats as Peanut
- Joseph Gordon as Little Joe
- Alonzo Thompson as Malik
- Kirk Miles as Big Man
- Lynette Hill as Candy
- Kelvin Davis as Czar
- Michael Hubbard as barber
- Kenyatta as barber shop customer

== Production ==
Streetwise was filmed in and around the Washington metropolitan area, but primarily in the Anacostia neighborhood of Southeast, Washington, D.C. Several iconic landmarks are featured throughout the film, including the Barry Farms Dwellings (where the Walker family lived), The Awakening sculpture (when it was located in Hains Point), the graffiti Wall of Sheridan Terrace, the Cadillac Motel (in Brandywine, Maryland), Anacostia Park and the Big Chair. Several well-known locals made cameos throughout the film, including James "Jas Funk" Thomas (of the go-go band Rare Essence), Tony "Big Tony" Fisher (of the go-go band Trouble Funk), the radio personality Konan (credited as "CJ"), and DJ Kool.

Although Brown chose fictional characters, comparison could be drawn between Raymond and Rayful Edmond III (a legendary drug lord in D.C.), who was as ruthless in real life as that of Raymond. However, Edmond's final fate was abated by prison instead of death.

== Release ==
Streetwise screened for a few months exclusively at the "AMC Rivertowne Commons 12 Theatre" in Oxon Hill, Maryland before being released on VHS in 1998, and released on DVD in 2004 through Maverick Home Entertainment.

== Soundtrack ==
The original soundtrack for Streetwise was released on Capital City Records and included original musical performances by Drama City, Inner City Groove, Junkyard Band, Rare Essence, Triple Threat, and Trouble Funk. The album is currently out-of-print.

== See also ==
- List of hood films
- Good to Go, 1986 film
- Culture of Washington, D.C.
- Music of Washington, D.C.
