= Gordon Bijelonic =

American film producer

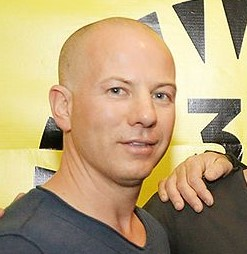
- Bijelonic at the 2014 Miami International Film Festival presentation of Kid Cannabis
- Occupation: Film Producer
- Website: http://www.gordonbijelonic.com

Gordon Bijelonic is a Serbian/American film producer known for the feature films Laggies and Kid Cannabis, and for his work as a senior executive at One Race Films. He also produces 3D documentaries for the IMAX theatre venues.

== Career ==
Born and raised in New York City, Bijelonic has produced over fifty films, involving over 300 million production dollars. He has worked with actors such as Vin Diesel, Robert De Niro, Forest Whitaker, John Travolta, Christopher Plummer, Robin Williams, Mila Kunis, Peter Dinklage, Ellen Burstyn, Bruce Willis , Keira Knightley , Morgan Freeman , and 50 cent.

Bijelonic began his career as a New York City theater actor, before segueing into production work. At the request of Vin Diesel, Bijelonic executive produced the actor's first feature film Strays in 1997, which debuted at the Sundance Film Festival. The independent film was directed, written by and starred Diesel. Bijelonic became a senior executive for ten years at Vin Diesel's production company One Race Films. While he was there, the company produced the features Fast and the Furious, xxx, A Man Apart, and The Chronicles of Riddick.

Bijelonic later teamed up with Datari Turner, a former model for the Abercrombie & Fitch catalogs. The duo have produced a series of films, including romantic comedies, crime thrillers, and black comedies. They produced the features Another Happy Day and LUV. Both were presented at the Sundance Film Festival, respectively in 2011 and 2012, with the crime drama LUV receiving a Grand Jury Prize nomination. Another Happy Day co-starring Ellen Barkin and Demi Moore, was also shown at South by Southwest. Another feature, titled Kid Cannabis, was produced in 2014. Based on a true story, the plot revolves around a teenager smuggling marijuana from Canada. The film was screened at the Miami International Film Festival.

Bijelonic's film Laggies premiered at the 2014 Sundance Film Festival and is a romantic comedy starring Keira Knightley. In 2016, Bijelonic had planned on going into production with the film Crossed. The script was co-written by his good friend, the late rapper Dwight "Heavy D" Myers who was originally supposed to star in the film.

In 2017, Bijelonic spoke about his partnership with Large Screen Cinema at the SXSW festival. In order to showcase a 3D documentary film he produced, Bijelonic is building the first IMAX Theater in Panama. The film in question is about the Panama Canal and is narrated by Morgan Freeman. He also plans on building the first IMAX theatre in Peru and producing a 3D film on Machu Picchu.

In 2018, Bijelonic partnered with the directors Joe and Anthony Russo to launch a project in Las Vegas involving immersive theater. It allows the audience to modify the play's narrative through active participation.

Bijelonic is a member of the Producers Guild of America.

== Background ==
Bijelonic's family immigrated to the United States before he was born. Both his parents are of Serb descent and left Bosnia, Yugoslavia in 1969. They spent time in an Austrian refugee camp after fleeing the Socialist regime in Bosnia. The Cathedral of Saint Sava in New York City assured them safe passage to the United States.

== Filmography ==
- 2021 Tension
- 2021 Reactor
- 2021 American Siege
- 2018 Mara
- 2017 Panama Canal in 3D: A Land Divided, A World United
- 2014 Lap Dance
- 2014 The Forger (2014 film)
- 2014 The Angriest Man in Brooklyn
- 2014 Kid Cannabis
- 2014 Laggies
- 2013 Some Velvet Morning
- 2013 Kilimanjaro
- 2012 Freelancers
- 2012 It's a Disaster
- 2012 Dysfunctional Friends
- 2012 About Cherry
- 2012 LUV (film)
- 2011 Salvation Boulevard
- 2011 Another Happy Day
- 2010 Gun
- 2009 The Bleeding
- 1998 Franky Goes to Hollywood
- 1997 Strays (1997 film)
