= Saving Private Ryan =

1998 film by Steven Spielberg

- Theatrical release poster
- Directed by: Steven Spielberg
- Written by: Robert Rodat
- Produced by: Steven Spielberg; Ian Bryce; Mark Gordon; Gary Levinsohn
- Starring: Tom Hanks; Edward Burns; Matt Damon; Tom Sizemore
- Cinematography: Janusz Kamiński
- Edited by: Michael Kahn
- Music by: John Williams
- Production companies: Amblin Entertainment; Mutual Film Company
- Distributed by: DreamWorks Pictures; Paramount Pictures
- Release date: July 24, 1998
- Running time: 170 minutes
- Country: United States
- Language: English
- Budget: $65–70 million
- Box office: $482.3 million (Note: This is the cumulative box office gross of the original theatrical release and re-releases.)

Saving Private Ryan is a 1998 American war film directed by Steven Spielberg and written by Robert Rodat. Set in 1944 in Normandy, France, during World War II, it follows a group of soldiers, led by Captain John Miller (Tom Hanks), on a mission to locate Private James Francis Ryan (Matt Damon) and bring him home safely after his three brothers have been killed in action. The film also stars Edward Burns and Tom Sizemore.

Inspired by the books of Stephen E. Ambrose and accounts of multiple soldiers in a single family, such as the Sullivan brothers and the Niland brothers, being killed in action, Rodat drafted the script, and Paramount Pictures hired him to finish writing it. The project came to the attention of Hanks and Spielberg, whose involvement, due to their previous successes, secured the project's development. Spielberg wanted to make Saving Private Ryan as authentic as possible and hired Frank Darabont and Scott Frank to do uncredited rewrites based on research and interviews with veterans. The main cast went through a week-long boot camp to help them understand the soldier's experience. Filming took place from June to September 1997, on a $65–70 million budget, almost entirely on location in England and Ireland. The opening Omaha Beach battle was the most demanding scene, costing $12 million to film over a four-week period, and using 1,500 background actors.

Released on July 24, 1998, Saving Private Ryan became one of the year's most successful films, earning critical acclaim for its graphic portrayal of combat. WWII veterans described the combat scenes as the most realistic portrayal of their own experiences they had seen; some said they had been unable to watch it due to their traumatic memories. The film earned $481.8 million, making it the second-highest-grossing film of 1998, and went on to win many accolades, including Golden Globe, Academy, BAFTA, and Saturn awards.

Considered one of the greatest war films ever made, Saving Private Ryan's battle-scene filming techniques inspired many subsequent war, action, and superhero films, and numerous directors have cited Saving Private Ryan as an influence on them. The picture is credited with having helped to renew interest in WWII at the turn of the century, inspiring other films, television shows, and video games set during the war. In 2014, the film was selected for preservation in the United States National Film Registry by the Library of Congress as "culturally, historically, or aesthetically significant".

== Plot ==
On June 6, 1944, soldiers of the U.S. Army land at Omaha Beach during the Normandy invasion, suffering heavily from artillery and machine gun fire from the fortified German defenders. Initially dazed by the ferocity of the defense, 2nd Ranger Battalion Captain John H. Miller leads a surviving group up the cliffs to neutralize the coastal defenses firing onto the beach, ensuring the success of the landings.

The United States Department of War receives communication that three of four Ryan brothers have been killed in action; the last, James Francis Ryan of the 101st Airborne Division, is listed as missing. General George C. Marshall orders that Ryan be found and sent home, to spare his family the loss of all its sons. Miller is tasked with recovering Ryan and assembles a detachment of soldiers to accompany him: Mike Horvath, Richard Reiben, Adrian Caparzo, Stanley Mellish, Daniel Jackson, medic Irwin Wade, and interpreter Timothy Upham, who lacks combat experience.

The group tracks Ryan to the town of Neuville-au-Plain, where Caparzo is killed by a German sniper while trying to rescue a young girl. Mourning their friend, the men grow resentful at being forced to risk their lives for one man. They later find James Frederick Ryan, but realize he is the wrong man with a similar name. That evening, the men rest in a chapel, where Miller tells Horvath that his hands began uncontrollably shaking after he joined the war. The men travel to a rallying point where the 101st Airborne might be after landing off course, where they find scores of wounded and displaced soldiers. Wade admonishes Reiben, Mellish, and Jackson for callously searching through a pile of deceased soldiers' dog tags in front of passing troops, hoping to find Ryan's among them and conclude their mission. Remorseful for ignoring their behavior, Miller shouts for anyone who knows Ryan; one soldier tells him that Ryan was reassigned to defend a vital bridge in the town of Ramelle.

On the way, Miller decides to neutralize a German gun nest they discover, against the advice of his men, and although they are successful, Wade is killed. The men prepare to execute a surrendered German soldier in revenge, but Upham intervenes, arguing that they should follow the rules of war. Miller releases the soldier, nicknamed "Steamboat Willie", ordering that he surrender to the next Allied patrol. Discontented with the mission, Reiben threatens to desert, leading to a standoff between the men that Miller defuses by revealing his civilian background as a teacher and baseball coach, which he had always refused to disclose. Miller muses that people often guessed his career before he became a soldier, while his men could not, implying that war has changed him, and worries whether his wife will still recognize him after the war.

In Ramelle, Miller's detachment finds Ryan and informs him of their mission, but Ryan refuses to abandon his post or his fellow soldiers, believing he does not deserve to go home more than anyone else. Horvath convinces Miller that saving Ryan might be the only truly decent thing they can accomplish during the war. Miller takes command of Ryan's group as the only officer present and prepares the soldiers for a German assault. During the battle, Jackson and Horvath are killed, and Upham stands paralyzed with fear as Mellish is stabbed to death. Steamboat Willie returns and shoots Miller before reinforcements arrive to defeat the Germans. Upham confronts Willie, who attempts to surrender again, and kills him. Upham and Reiben observe as the mortally wounded Miller tells Ryan to earn the sacrifices made to send him home.

Decades later, an elderly Ryan and his family visit Miller's grave at the Normandy Cemetery. Ryan expresses that he remembers Miller's words every day, has lived his life the best he could, and hopes he has earned their sacrifices.

== Cast ==
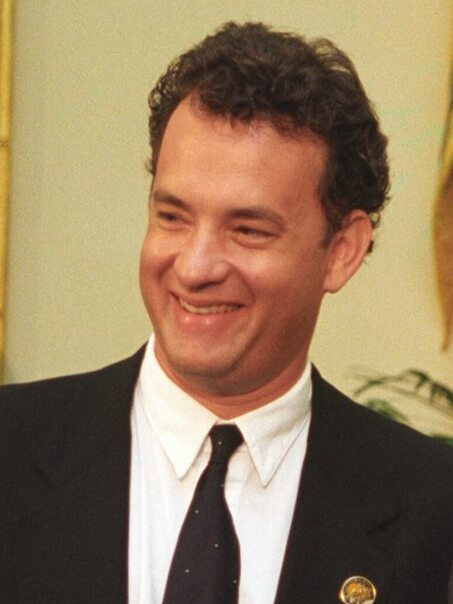
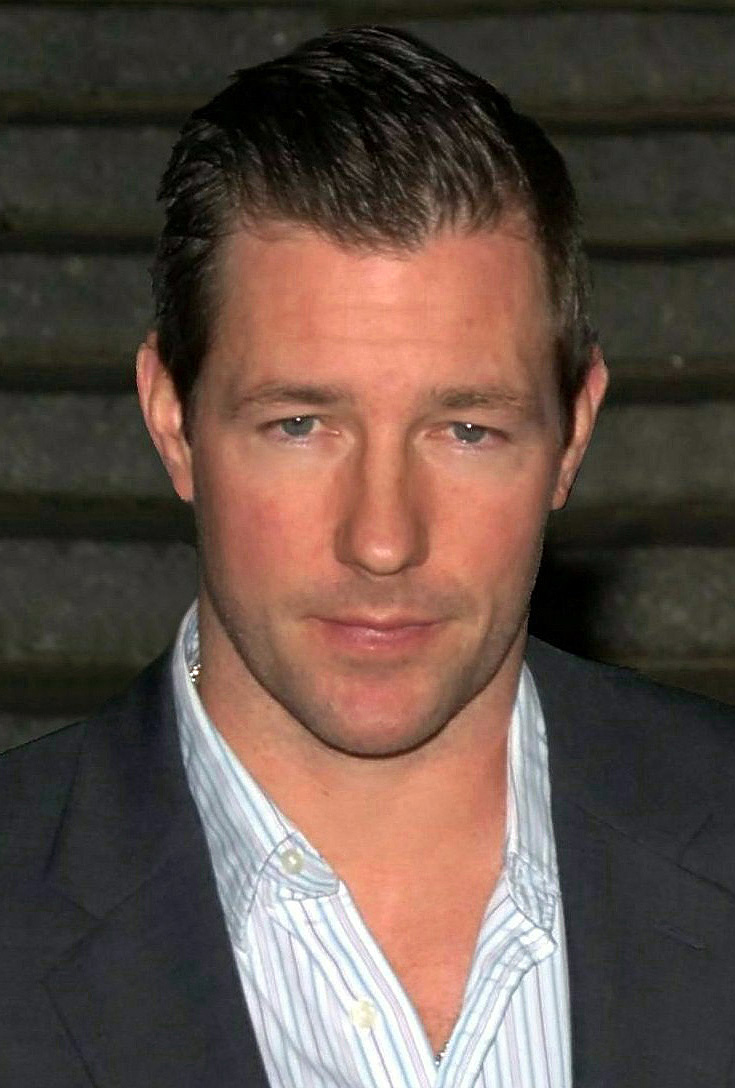
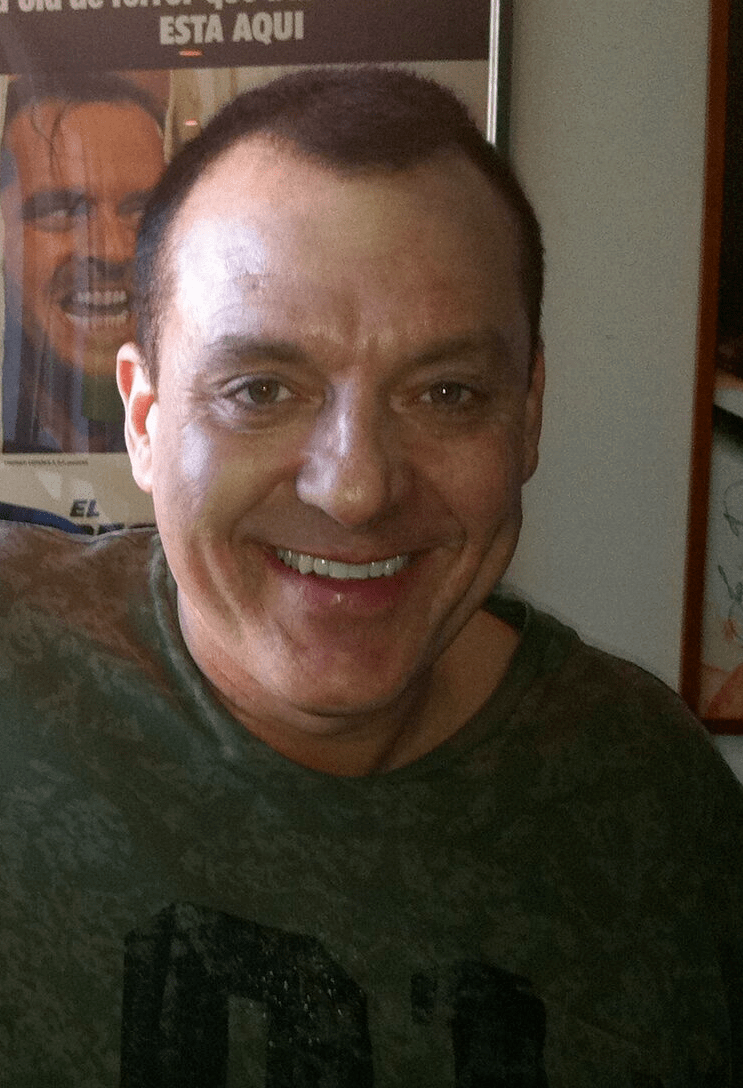
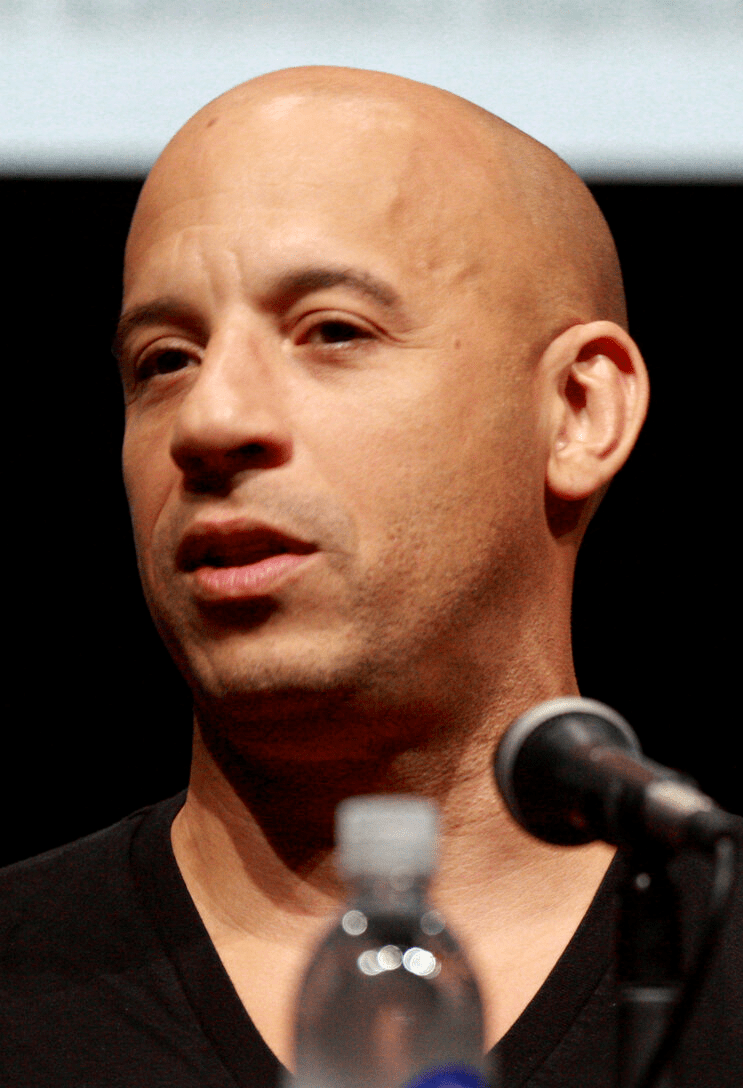
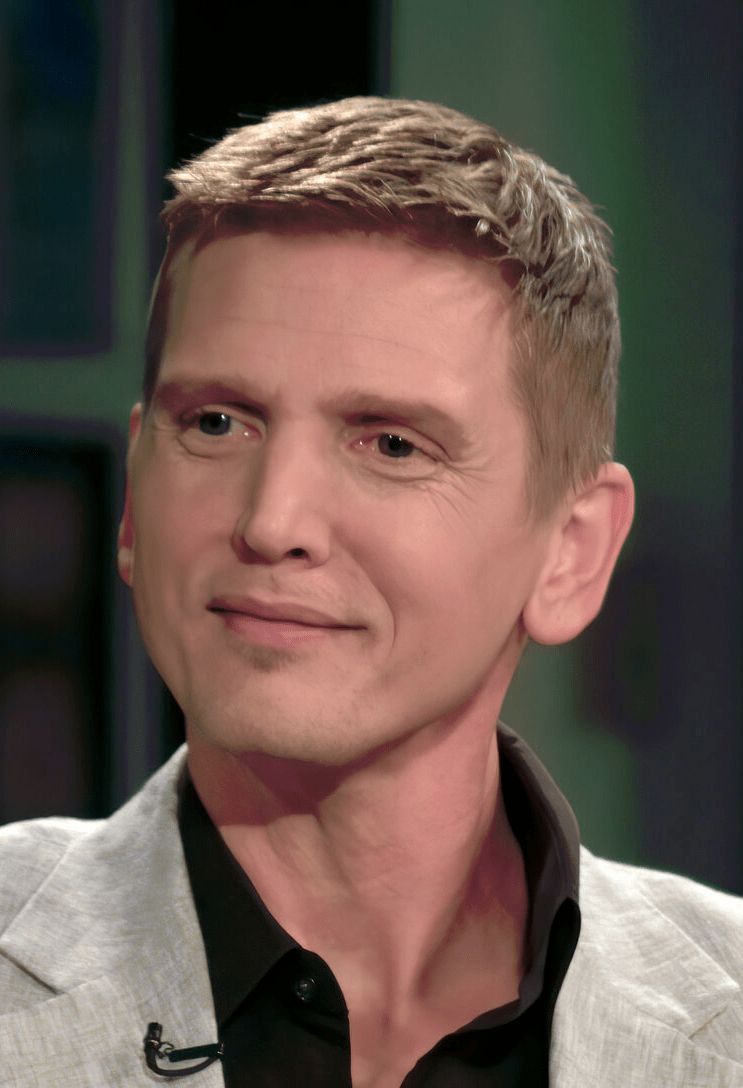
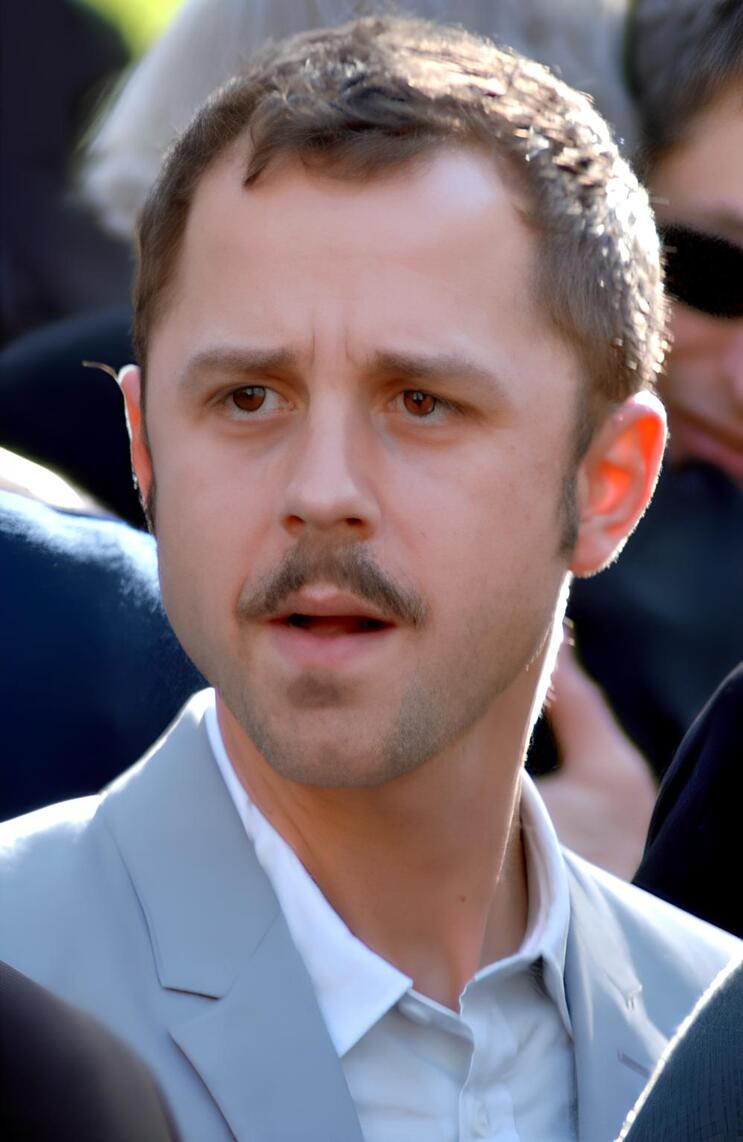
(Top, left to right) Tom Hanks (pictured in 1995), Edward Burns (2010), and Tom Sizemore (2011); (Bottom) Vin Diesel (2013), Barry Pepper (2009), and Giovanni Ribisi (2009)
- Tom Hanks as John H. Miller: A determined U.S. captain suffering from post-traumatic stress disorder
- Edward Burns as Richard Reiben: A rebellious soldier
- Tom Sizemore as Mike Horvath: Miller's long-time friend and second-in-command
- Jeremy Davies as Timothy Upham: A staff assistant lacking any combat experience, recruited by Miller as a French and German interpreter
- Vin Diesel as Adrian Caparzo: A battle-hardened and compassionate soldier
- Adam Goldberg as Stanley "Fish" Mellish: A wisecracking Jewish trooper, and Caparzo's close friend
- Barry Pepper as Daniel Jackson: A religious sniper
- Giovanni Ribisi as Irwin Wade: The team's diligent and caring combat medic
- Matt Damon as James Francis Ryan: A young soldier from Iowa
- Dennis Farina as Walter Anderson: An American officer who tasks Miller with finding Ryan
- Ted Danson as Fred Hamill: A captain in the 101st Airborne Division's Pathfinders
- Harve Presnell as George C. Marshall: The Chief of Staff of the United States Army, who orders the mission to recover Ryan.
- Bryan Cranston as I.W. Bryce: A colonel in the War Department
- David Wohl as T. E. Sanders: An officer in the War Department
- Nathan Fillion as James Frederick Ryan: A soldier mistaken for James Francis Ryan (credited as Minnesota Ryan)
- Paul Giamatti as William Hill: A war-weary sergeant in Neuville
- Ryan Hurst as Michaelson: A hearing-impaired paratrooper
- Max Martini as Henderson: A soldier in Ryan's company
- Leland Orser as DeWindt: A lieutenant from the 99th Troop Carrier Squadron

The cast also includes Glenn Wrage as Doyle, Corey Johnson as a radioman, John Sharian as Corporal Loeb, and Rolf Saxon as Lieutenant Briggs—Allied soldiers at the Omaha beach landing. Demetri Goritsas and Dylan Bruno portray Parker and Private First Class Toynbe, respectively, who aid in the battle of Ramelle. Joerg Stadler appears as Steamboat Willie, a German prisoner. Amanda Boxer portrays Ryan's mother, while Harrison Young and Kathleen Byron portray the elderly James Ryan and his wife, Margaret. Technical advisor and Marine veteran Dale Dye appears as a War Department colonel.

== Production ==
=== Concept ===
Producer Mark Gordon was a fan of writer Robert Rodat's previous work on films such as Tall Tale (1995) and Fly Away Home (1996). The pair met in early 1995 to discuss potential projects and ideas. Within a few weeks, Rodat conceived of Saving Private Ryan. He was inspired by a gift from his wife, the historical book D-Day June 6, 1944: The Climactic Battle of World War II (1994), by Stephen E. Ambrose, recounting the events of the Normandy landings. Rodat visited a monument in Keene, New Hampshire dedicated to American soldiers killed in combat; he noticed the losses included brothers. He said, "The idea of losing a son to war is painful beyond description ... the idea of losing more than one son is inconceivable". The Ryan family was based primarily on the four Niland brothers detailed in Ambrose's book, who were deployed during WWII; two were killed and a third presumed dead; the fourth was returned from the war.

=== Development ===
To develop Saving Private Ryan, Gordon founded the independent film studio Mutual Film Company, alongside producer Gary Levinsohn. Gordon brought Rodat's draft to Paramount Pictures executives; they responded positively and hired Rodat who wrote the script over the following 12 months. Michael Bay was hired as director, but left the project because he could not resolve how to approach the material. Carin Sage, a junior agent representing Tom Hanks at the Creative Artists Agency, gave the script to Hanks, who was immediately interested and met with Gordon and Levinsohn. Hanks shared the script with Steven Spielberg who agreed to direct because the pair had wanted to work together for some time. Rodat thought that Paramount would cancel the project after the studio purchased two other WWII-era scripts, Combat and With Wings as Eagles, with popular actors Bruce Willis and Arnold Schwarzenegger attached, respectively. However, having secured the involvement of Hanks and Spielberg, two of the highest-paid and most successful actors and directors, Gordon suggested Paramount executives prioritize Saving Private Ryan.

Describing what interested him about the project, Spielberg said, "So what you're doing is sending eight people out, all of whom have parents, to rescue one boy and send him back to his mom when any or all of these kids, along the mission route, could be killed. That was the central tug that made me want to tell the story." Spielberg had a lifelong interest in WWII, having made war films as a teenager because "it was the seminal conversation inside my family. My parents talked about the Holocaust and they talked about combat and war. And I was born knowing this. My dad was a veteran ... he had many veterans over to the house, and I became absolutely obsessed ... based on my father's stories, recollections, and also based on all the WWII movies". He described the project as a tribute to his father.

With Spielberg on board, DreamWorks Pictures, which he co-founded, became involved as a financier, with his company Amblin Entertainment as a production company. Spielberg's clout effectively removed Gordon and Levinsohn from the production, having no creative input, equity, or rights, but receiving a producer's credit and one-off payment. Levinsohn said, "You just know going in what the score is ... I guess it's unspoken that when you hire Steven Spielberg you're not going to be on the set making decisions". DreamWorks hired Ian Bryce to replace them. In April 1997, Sumner Redstone, chairman of Paramount's parent company Viacom, had Spielberg flip a coin to determine the film's distribution rights. Spielberg won the toss, giving DreamWorks the favored North American distribution rights and Paramount the international rights. Earnings were held collectively and split evenly between the studios. In exchange, Paramount received the North American distribution rights to DreamWorks' Deep Impact (1998). (Note: Attributed to multiple references:) To keep the budget low, Spielberg and Hanks took minimal upfront salaries in exchange for a guaranteed 17.5% of the gross profits, equivalent to 35 cents of every dollar earned.

=== Rewrite ===
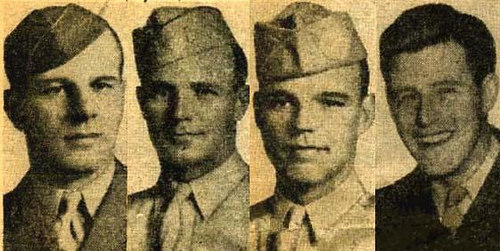
The Niland brothers (1940s) were an influence on Saving Private Ryan's plot

Spielberg's initial concept for Saving Private Ryan was a Boys' Own–style adventure film in which the search for Ryan was a public relations effort by the war department. However, after interviewing WWII veterans for research, he found this idea inappropriate. He decided to embed the story within a realistic portrayal of actual events while portraying the conflicted morality of sending men into life-threatening situations to save one man. (Note: Attributed to multiple references:) He said, "I cannot tell you how many veterans came up to me ... and said: 'Please be honest about it. Please don't make another Hollywood movie about WWII. Please tell our stories ...'" The surviving Niland family was interviewed, and the story was further influenced by other substantial family war losses, including the five Sullivan brothers killed during WWII, and the Bixby brothers during the American Civil War; the resulting letter by Abraham Lincoln is quoted in the film.

Spielberg described existing WWII films as "sanitized" and sentimentalized, focused on depicting honor and the glory of service in a manner that was "very safe and wholly untrue". (Note: Attributed to multiple references:) He wanted to present the courage of the soldiers in the face of "palpable terror, almost blind terror":

I remember one of the [veterans] telling me the entire charge up the beach was a blur—not a blur to his memory because he still remembered every single grain of sand when he had his face buried in it from that fusillade raining down on them from above. But he described how everything was not in focus for him. He described the sounds, and he described the vibrations of every concussion of every 88 shell that hit the beach, which gave some of them bloody noses, rattled their ears. The ground would come up and slam into their faces from the concussions."

Ambrose served as a historical consultant. He disliked glorified depictions of the Normandy landings that ignored the reality of soldiers slowly dying in mud and water, wanting "their mothers, they wanted morphine. It took a long time." Spielberg believed the legacy of the Vietnam War had made his generation less interested in glorifying combat in film. Even so, he was influenced by early war films such as Battleground (1949), The Steel Helmet (1951), and Hell Is for Heroes (1962).

Although Rodat's script came close to the ideal WWII project he had hoped for, Spielberg said it had "a few problems". He hired Frank Darabont and Scott Frank to perform uncredited script rewrites. (Note: Attributed to multiple references:) The scene begins as the second wave of soldiers arrives on Omaha beach (Darabont's suggestion), so they would be walking into "Hell on Earth" instead of empty beaches. Scott Frank performed rewrites based on transcriptions of Spielberg's recorded ideas and two folders of historical facts about the Normandy landings; these gave Frank ideas but he found it difficult to parse the reality of events into original ideas.

The Normandy cemetery scene was based on Spielberg's own experience visiting the area as a youth; he witnessed a family accompanying a man who fell to his knees and began to cry at a grave marker.

=== Casting ===
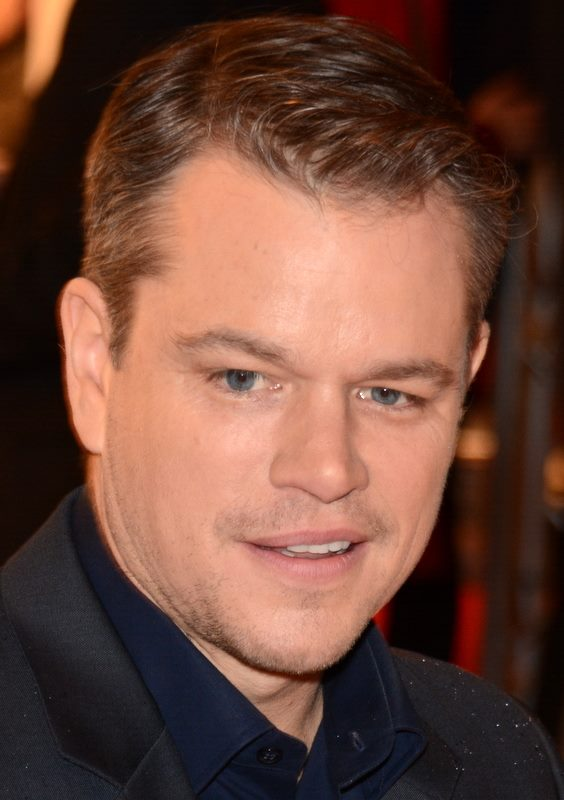
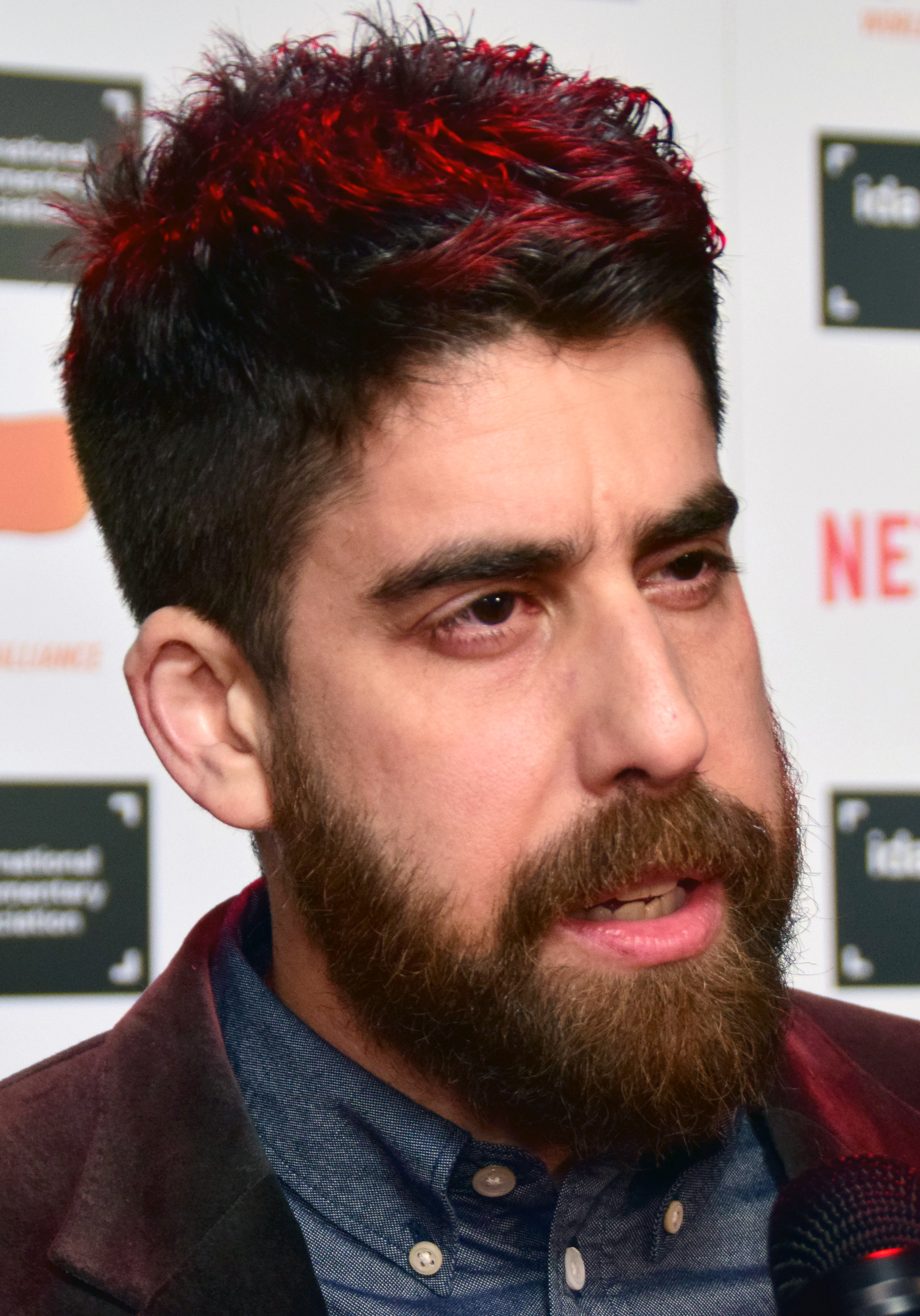
Matt Damon (pictured in 2014) and Adam Goldberg (2015)

Spielberg wanted older actors for his main cast, claiming that young soldiers would look older than their age under the stresses of war. Miller is the "adult in the story," intended to project a calmness and feeling of safety that is undermined by the character's uncontrollable handshaking. Spielberg wanted Hanks to play Miller because he was the only actor he thought of who "would not immediately want to use his teeth to pull out a pin from a hand grenade." Hanks formed Miller's character based on the history of the 2nd Ranger Battalion before Omaha Beach, saying he believed Miller was "horribly afraid" of getting more of his men killed. Mel Gibson and Harrison Ford were considered for the role. Miller's detachment is a diverse group, including a Jew and Italian, reminiscent of earlier WWII films; this was not a deliberate choice, although Spielberg believed he had subconsciously drawn on conventional WWII films. Burns described Reiben as a "wise guy" in the script, but the experience of filming the Omaha Beach landing inspired him to give the character a "much harder edge". Sizemore had been offered a role in The Thin Red Line (1998) but took Spielberg's offer of an alternative role as Horvath, Miller's friend and confidant. The actor had a history of drug addiction, and Spielberg mandated that he pass regular drug tests to keep his part, or the role would be recast and his scenes re-shot. Thomas Haden Church was considered for the role, but turned it down to star in Free Money (1998). Describing his character, Sizemore said, "he was a quiet man; he was taciturn; he followed orders, and he loved the captain ... if he had a tragic flaw, it was that he didn't know when he had had enough, when it was time to say, 'I can't do this anymore.'"

Diesel was cast after Spielberg saw his self-starring directorial efforts, Multi-Facial (1995) and Strays (1997). The actor was working as a telemarketer at the time, having struggled to secure acting jobs. Goldberg's role did not exist in the script until his casting. Spielberg wanted a relatively unknown actor to portray Private Ryan. Spielberg visited the set of Good Will Hunting (1997), and Robin Williams introduced him to Damon. Spielberg cast him shortly after, believing he possessed a "great American everyboy look," unaware that Good Will Hunting's success would significantly raise Damon's profile. (Note: Attributed to multiple references:) Neil Patrick Harris was considered for the role, and Edward Norton turned it down for American History X (1998). Noah Wyle was offered his pick of two roles: Private Ryan and Upham, but had to turn down the offer due to commitments to the television series ER. Pete Postlethwaite, Tony Shalhoub, and Garth Brooks were considered for unspecified roles.

At Hanks's and Dye's suggestion, Spielberg had the principal cast take part in a six-day boot camp, wanting them to experience cold, wet, and exhaustive conditions, like those of WWII soldiers. (Note: Attributed to multiple references:) Overseen by Dye and retired U.S. Marines, the actors remained in character while simulating attacks, performing 5-mile (8 km) runs with full backpacks, weapons training, military exercises, and push-ups after making mistakes, on three hours of sleep per night in cold and rainy conditions. The men wanted to quit, but Hanks convinced them otherwise, saying they would regret not following through and the experience would help them understand their characters and motivations. Diesel said, "at that moment we got this huge respect for him in real life, we were all exhausted, we all wanted to leave and here was this guy who was a superstar, who doesn't have to be here, voting to stay". Dye was present throughout filming to remind the actors of their training. Spielberg kept Damon out of the boot camp because he wanted the other actors to resent him and his character.

=== Pre-production ===
The pre-production for Saving Private Ryan was truncated because Spielberg chose to film Amistad (1997) immediately after finishing work on The Lost World: Jurassic Park (1997). Cinematographer Janusz Kamiński spent several weeks performing camera tests to define the film's visual aesthetic. The pair considered filming monochromatically as Spielberg had with his Holocaust film, Schindler's List (1993). However, they considered that this would seem "pretentious," and were interested in emulating the colored WWII footage from their research. Kamiński let his interpretation of the narrative dictate how to light scenes and narrowed down visual styles by identifying which films he did not want Saving Private Ryan to emulate. He and Spielberg were visually influenced by WWII documentaries, such as Memphis Belle: A Story of a Flying Fortress (1944), The Battle of Midway (1942), Why We Fight (1942–1945), and the Nazi propaganda films of Leni Riefenstahl. They also looked at various books, paintings, and photographs of the Omaha Beach invasion taken by the war photographer Robert Capa. Kamiński wanted it to look like a major production "shot on [16 mm film] by a bunch of combat cameramen".

A variety of camera techniques were used to emulate the experience of being on a battlefield: Kamiński removed the protective coating on some lenses, creating a "flatter", degraded image akin to WWII-era cameras, and mismatched lenses when using multiple cameras for an inconsistent result; alternating shutter angles and speeds; and desynchronizing the camera shutter which created a "streaking" effect. Kamiński considered this a risky option because if it failed there was no way to fix the image in post-production. A Clairmont Camera Image Shaker vibrated the camera to emulate the effects of a nearby explosion or rolling tank. Spielberg chose to film in 1.85:1 aspect ratio because he believed it was more lifelike and closer to "the way the human eye really sees," and found widescreen formats to be artificial.

Three months were spent scouting for a location to portray the Normandy coast. The real location was too developed for their needs, and many other French beaches were restricted by military or wildlife use; Spielberg believed officials were difficult because they did not want him filming there. Beaches researched in England and Scotland lacked either the aesthetics or amenities required, such as housing for the crew, and the filmmakers needed a specific depth for the cast to leap from the landing crafts into the water. Associate producer, Kevin De La Noy's earlier work on Braveheart (1995) in Ireland had developed contacts with the Irish Army and knowledge of local beaches. One such location, the 11 km (6.8 miles) long Curracloe Beach, near Curracloe, County Wexford, offered the desired golden sands and sheer cliffs and nearby amenities. (Note: Attributed to multiple references:) Spielberg selected a 1 km (0.62 miles) segment of the beach, known as Ballinesker. He said, "I was a bit disappointed that the beach we used wasn't as broad as the real Omaha Beach ... I tried to use certain wide-angle lenses to extend the length of the flats on the sandy beach before the soldiers reach the shingle. I used wider lenses for geography and tighter lenses for the compression of action." A segment adjacent to Blackwater, also in Wexford, was considered, but the local nuns could not make the land available in time. Service roads were built for vehicles to reach Ballinesker. Production designer Thomas E. Sanders led construction of the concrete battlements, bunkers, Czech hedgehogs, and barbed wire, much of which was made by local metalworkers. Over eleven weeks were spent preparing Ballinesker for filming. A storm destroyed some of the props just before filming, but they were rebuilt overnight. The main crew arrived on location on June 25, 1997.

=== Filming in Ireland ===
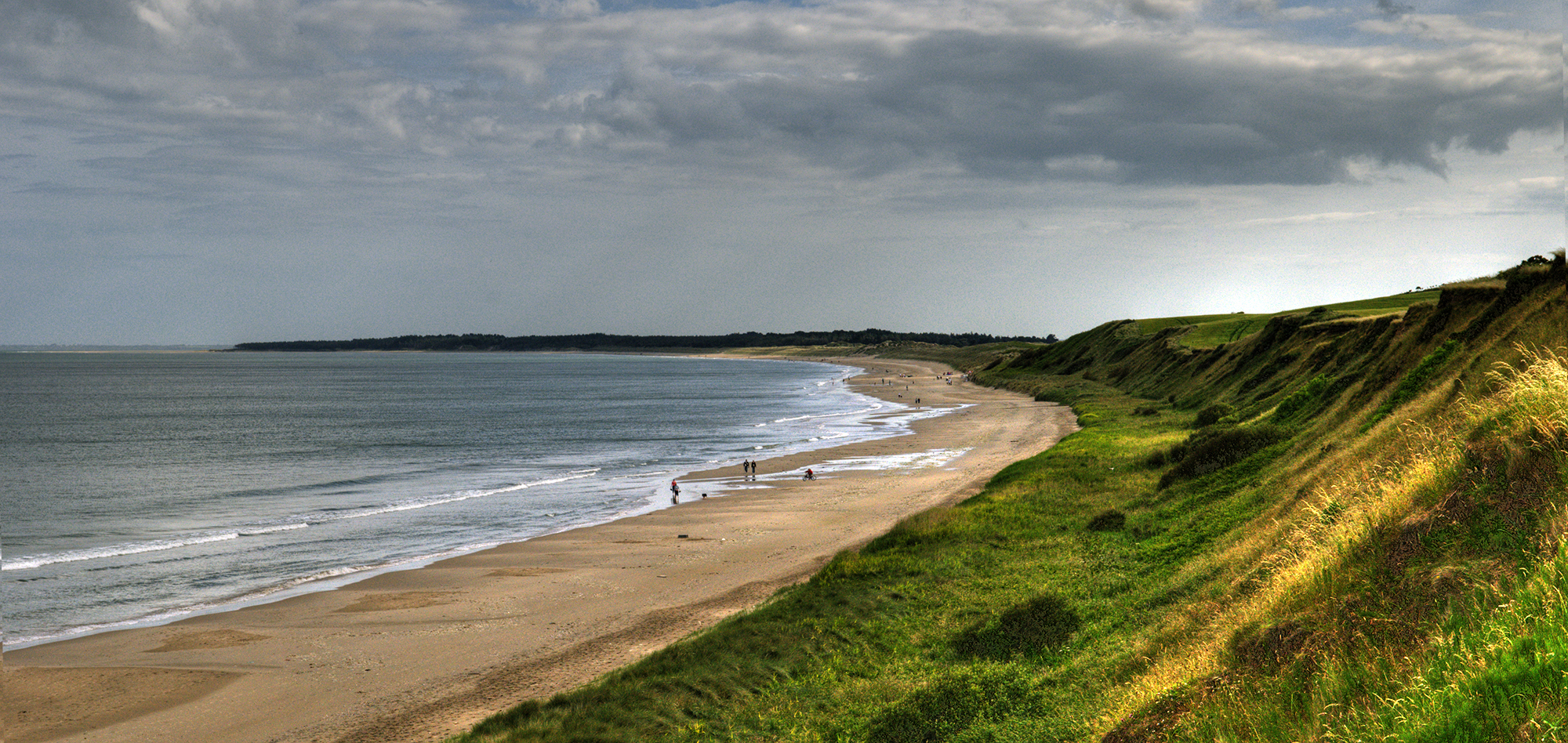
Ballinesker Beach (pictured in 2015), a segment of Curracloe strand in Ireland, was used to portray Omaha Beach

Principal photography began on June 27, 1997. Filming completed up to 50 shots per day. Spielberg wanted the actors to get little rest, "A war is fought fast, and I really wanted to keep all of the actors off-balance. I didn't want them to be able to read 75 pages of a novel ... I wanted to work fast enough so that they always felt as if they were in combat ... I had to keep them on the set, which meant shooting the film even faster than I normally do. War doesn't give you a break." Saving Private Ryan was shot almost entirely in continuity order, although some of the crew found this "a mentally demoralizing experience" because the cast started together and left as their characters died.

The Omaha Beach battle was filmed over three to four weeks, for $12 million. (Note: Attributed to multiple references:) The scene involved about 1,500 people including 400 crew, 1,000 volunteer reserve and Irish army soldiers, and dozens of extras and about 30 amputees and paraplegics fitted with prosthetic limbs to portray disfigured soldiers. (Note: Attributed to multiple references:) Their numbers were supplemented with over one thousand detailed mannequins. The extras were divided into platoons with a designated leader, allowing Dye to control their action via four different radios with aid from three non-commissioned officers. Costume designer Joanna Johnston contracted an American company responsible for making boots for soldiers during WWII to create about 2,000 pairs, using the last batch of dye from that period. Soldiers in the ocean wore wet suits beneath their uniforms to minimize hypothermia. Armorer Simon Atherton was responsible for supplying authentic weapons.

Two Higgins Boats used in the landings were used in the scene; additional boats from the 1950s were brought from California, Donegal, and Southampton. Hanks recalled:

The first day of shooting ... I was in the back of the landing craft, and that ramp went down and I saw the first 1-2-3-4 rows of guys just getting blown to bits. In my head, of course, I knew it was special effects, but I still wasn't prepared for how tactile it was. The air literally went pink and the noise was deafening and there's bits and pieces of stuff falling all on top of you and it was horrifying."

Soldiers vomiting from the boats was achieved using milk of magnesia. A crane shot moving from beneath the ocean surface to above the battlefield was achieved by placing the crane on a flatbed trailer and reversing it into the sea.

The Omaha Beach sequence was extensively choreographed by stunt coordinator Simon Crane, with squibs and explosives managed by Neil Corbould. The only serious accident resulted when an extra's foot was run over by a car. Thousands of gallons of fake blood were used, mainly to turn the ocean and shoreline red. Based on his interviews with veterans, Spielberg had dead fish strewn in the water and around the battlefield, as well as floating a Bible on the surface. Bullet impacts were emulated using air pipes concealed beneath the sand and ocean surface. Drums of diesel fuel were burned to create black smoke, while a series of pickup trucks carried systems to disperse white smoke.

During filming, the weather was cold, rainy, and overcast; Kamiński said this matched the weather during the Normandy landings, enhancing the film's accuracy. Artificial light was used sparingly apart from on the boats to highlight the actors' eyes under their helmets. Spielberg had the camera stay close to the ground to appear as if it was the view of a soldier avoiding getting shot or a combat cameraman. He intended for the audience to feel like they were a part of the battle rather than watching. Most of Saving Private Ryan was filmed with handheld cameras. This was physically demanding on camera operator Mitch Dubin and Steadicam operator Chris Haarhoff due to both proximity to the ground and movement through exploding scenery. The camera was close enough that fake blood, water, and sand would stick to the camera lens, but the filmmakers believed this made the footage more authentic.

Kamiński considered the extensive setup of explosives, smoke, and choreography of over a thousand characters to be demanding as it could take half a day to reset if something went wrong, but the majority of scenes in the sequence were captured in less than four takes, using up to three cameras simultaneously. Spielberg said, "I rarely walked away from a scene until I got what I wanted, and I'd say that I got what I wanted from those complex setups about 80 percent of the time." He reviewed each day's footage nightly in a local parish hall. The production crew remained after filming to restore the beach to its original state over the following month, per an ecological protection order.

=== Filming in England and France ===
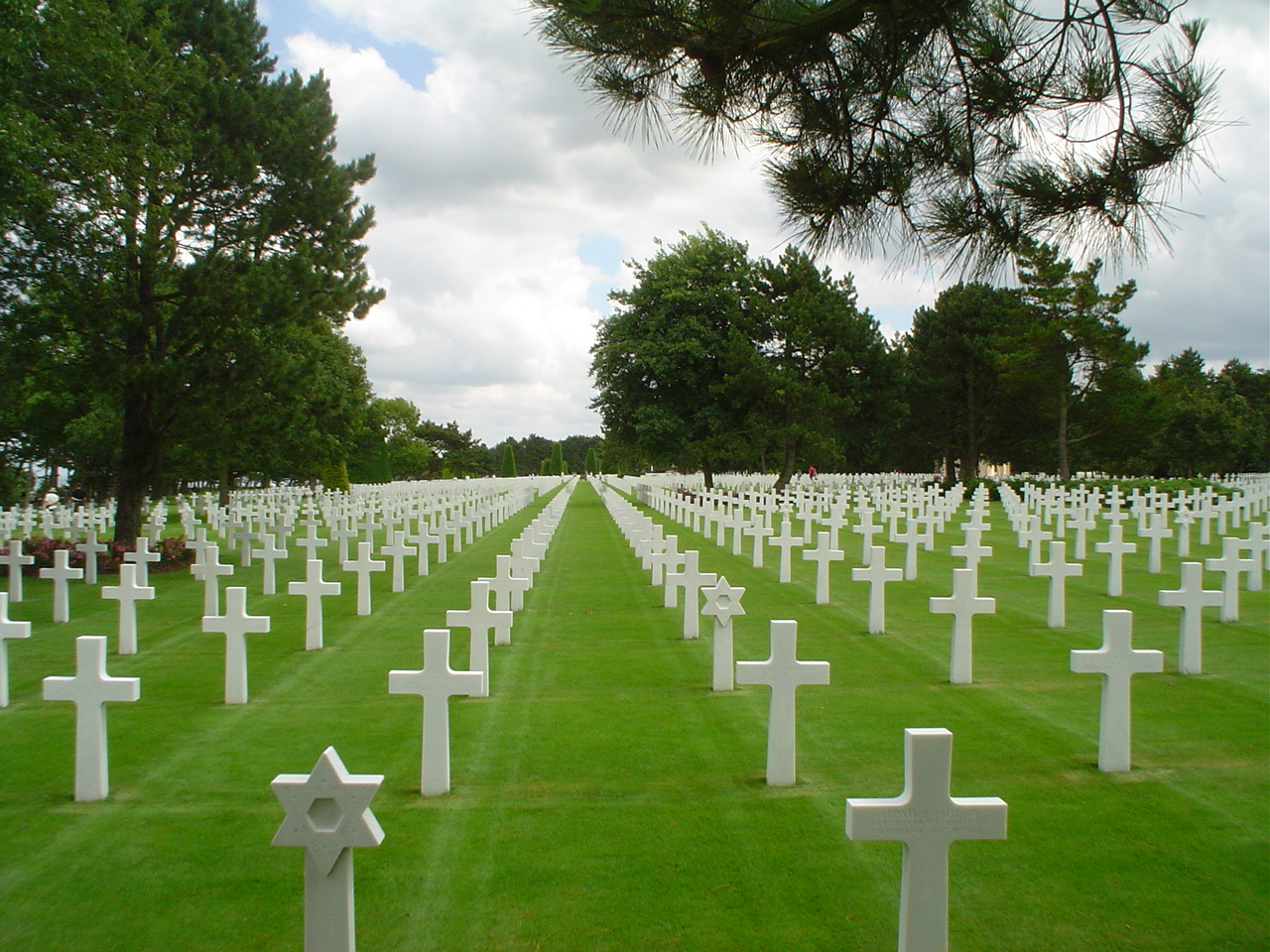
The opening and closing scenes of the film are set in the Normandy American Cemetery and Memorial near Omaha Beach.

Filming relocated to the Hatfield Aerodrome in Hertfordshire, England, at the end of August, for the remaining scenes and the battle of Ramelle. (Note: Attributed to multiple references:) French towns and rivers were scouted where a partial set could be built, but this was discarded over environmental concerns of filming contaminating the water. Instead, Sanders and his team built the fictional Ramelle on the grounds of the Aerodrome, based on five towns where fighting took place. Nearly three city blocks long, the set included fully built buildings, facades, and a custom built, 900 ft (270 m) long river. The river was lined because they "had to control the height of the water very carefully". Explosives were used to create bomb craters and damage around Ramelle. (Note: Attributed to multiple references:)

Though the battle involved fewer extras than the Omaha Beach scene, several weeks were spent developing the complex choreography based on a battle plan devised by Dye. Spielberg did not storyboard Saving Private Ryan because he wanted to position the camera spontaneously in reaction to what was taking place in each scene and he often relied on Dye and other WWII consultants for advice on staging the combat scenes. Dale also advised on technical aspects of weapons; where Spielberg wanted to use larger explosions typically found in Hollywood action films, Dye would generally advise him to "go half that size, they were never that big". The production was estimated to have spent about £8 million in the local area.

Spielberg's spontaneous approach carried into other aspects; about halfway through filming, he decided to depict the remainder of the film from Upham's perspective, believing he represented the audience's inexperience of war. Goldberg's character was only going to be shot dead until Dye suggested a hand-to-hand combat sequence on the day of filming, leading Mellish to be stabbed through the heart. A separate scene of Ryan talking about his brothers was ad-libbed by Damon.

The German machine-gun nest and following ambush of a half-track vehicle were filmed on the grounds of Thame Park, Thame, in Oxfordshire; the chapel interior where Miller's men rest was filmed in the Thame Park chapel. The Iowa cornfields where Ryan's mother lives in a house built for filming was set near West Kennet, Wiltshire. The American war office was filmed in the Hatfield Aerodrome. Kamiński wanted scenes in America to be more colorful and a relief from the muted tones of the combat scenes, so he positioned very bright lighting outside the windows. Scenes featuring the elderly Ryan were filmed at the Normandy American Cemetery and Memorial in Colleville-sur-Mer, France, adjacent to Omaha Beach.

Filming concluded ahead of schedule on September 13, 1997, after 12 weeks, with the French church interior scenes. (Note: Attributed to multiple references:) The estimated total budget was $65–$70 million. (Note: Attributed to multiple references:) (Note: The 1998 budget of $65–$70 million is equivalent to $128 million–$138 million in 2025.)

=== Post-production ===
Kamiński chose to render his footage using Technicolor's proprietary ENR process (similar to a bleach bypass) which retained more silver in the film stock and produced deeper blacks. He used "70 percent ENR" for a desaturated image which added a blue hue. Concerned this change would make the fake blood appear inauthentic, the effects department mixed blue coloring into it, giving it a dark red appearance. Visual-effects studio Industrial Light & Magic provided digital enhancements; many bullet wounds and blood splatter were computer-generated imagery.

Michael Kahn edited the final 170-minute cut. (Note: Attributed to multiple references:) Spielberg said that Kahn's style was intended to defy audience expectations and not make every scene or transition clear. Some scenes were cut because of their graphic imagery, such as Miller's unit encounter with burnt out tanks with charred bodies. Mellish's death was also trimmed, removing parts where the character screams in pain, after Spielberg's projectionist said "It's too painful to watch."

Spielberg said his movie had to be "ugly", but was worried the violent content could be seen as exploitative and earn it a restrictive NC-17 rating from the Motion Picture Association of America, restricting it to audiences over 17 years of age. He anticipated that the "historical importance" of the content would be taken into consideration; it received an R rating, meaning children could watch when accompanied by an adult.

=== Music ===
John Williams, Spielberg's longtime collaborator, produced, composed and conducted the score. Spielberg chose little music accompaniment, wanting the sounds of battle and death to be prominent. Using a spotting process, he and Williams watched a rough cut of the film to agree on which scenes would feature music. Williams deliberately avoided "anything grandiose or operatic". Williams recorded the 55-minute score over three days at Symphony Hall in Boston, with the Boston Symphony Orchestra and vocals by the Tanglewood Festival Chorus. The recording cost about $100,000 per hour. Spielberg chose the Orchestra: "This is a movie about a company of soldiers, and it seemed appropriate to use an experienced company of musicians who are all virtuosos. Also we really wanted the sound of this room, Symphony Hall. On a soundstage you can get acoustically correct sound, but you don't hear the air. Here you get a rich, warm sound off the walls and ceiling, and you do hear the air; Symphony Hall is an instrument too."

== Release ==
=== Context ===
The 1998 summer theatrical season began in early May with Deep Impact, a surprise box office hit that studios saw as a positive indicator for their upcoming 100 film releases. Godzilla and Armageddon were expected to be the biggest successes, while industry executives were hopeful for smaller budget films (costing less than $60 million) like Small Soldiers, The Negotiator, The Parent Trap, and There's Something About Mary to become sleeper hits. Fewer sequels and less escapist entertainment were scheduled for release, and more films were targeted toward older audiences. Saving Private Ryan was highly anticipated but analysis suggested the film faced commercial limitations because of its long runtime, restricting the number of times it could be screened daily, and its violent content. DreamWorks' marketing chief Terry Press said it was risky to release a serious drama in the summer, a time generally reserved for family and escapist entertainment, but this was offset by Spielberg and Hanks's popularity. A screening for DreamWorks and Paramount executives was highly praised, but Spielberg had low expectations, believing the film was too violent to attract broad audiences.

=== Box office ===
The film premiered on July 21, 1998. The event was a low-profile affair without a party or many celebrities; Press said of the premiere, "it would have been inappropriate". Saving Private Ryan was released in the United States and Canada on July 24, 1998. During its opening weekend, it earned $30.6 million across 2,463 theaters—an average of $12,414 per theater. This figure made it the number-one film of the weekend, ahead of The Mask of Zorro ($13.4 million) in its second weekend, Lethal Weapon 4 ($13.1 million) in its third, and There's Something About Mary ($12.5 million), also in its second. The audience was split evenly between women and men, and skewed towards those aged over 25. The New York Times described it as unusual for a near-three-hour-long drama to perform so well on its opening weekend, crediting positive reviews. DreamWorks believed the box-office figure would have been higher if not for a delay in film prints arriving in hundreds of theaters across California and Arizona until late in the afternoon.

In its second weekend, Saving Private Ryan remained the number-one film, with $23.6 million, ahead of the debuting The Parent Trap ($11.1 million) and There's Something About Mary ($10.9 million) in its third. Saving Private Ryan retained the number-one position in its third weekend with ($17.4 million), ahead of the debuts of Snake Eyes ($16.3 million) and Halloween H20: 20 Years Later ($16.1 million), and its fourth with $13.2 million, ahead of the debuts of How Stella Got Her Groove Back ($11.3 million) and The Avengers ($10.3 million). In its fifth weekend, Saving Private Ryan fell to number 2 with $10.1 million, behind the debut of Blade ($17.1 million). Without regaining the number 1 position, it ranked among the top ten for 12 weeks. By the end of its theatrical run, Saving Private Ryan earned a total box-office gross of $216.5 million, making it the highest-grossing film of the year, ahead of Armageddon ($201.6 million) and There's Something About Mary ($176.5 million). This also made it only the third R-rated film to earn more than $200 million, after 1984's Beverly Hills Cop ($235 million) and 1991's Terminator 2: Judgment Day ($205 million).

Outside of the U.S. and Canada, Saving Private Ryan is estimated to have earned a further $265.3 million. This gave the film a cumulative worldwide gross of $481.8 million, making it the second-highest-grossing film of 1998, behind Armageddon ($553.7 million). (Note: The 1998 theatrical box office gross of $481.8 million is equivalent to $952 million in 2025.)

Saving Private Ryan was seen as the biggest success of the theatrical summer. The New York Times wrote that the success of a "prestige film" during a time of blockbuster entertainment with broad appeal was evidence that audiences were accepting of serious dramas alongside action films, such as Armageddon and Godzilla, and "gross-out comedy" like There's Something About Mary. The publication wrote that the popularity of Saving Private Ryan was, in part, because it depicted a "nobler, cleaner era" promoting values of heroism and "patriotic duty". The 1998 box office broke records with over $7 billion earned. Despite expectations, the biggest successes had relatively modest budgets, such as Saving Private Ryan, There's Something About Mary, Rush Hour, and The Waterboy, while the anticipated blockbusters, such as Godzilla and Armageddon, were so expensive to make that they were less profitable. Re-releases of Saving Private Ryan have raised the box office to $482.3 million. Spielberg's and Hanks's pay agreement earned them an estimated $30–$40 million each of the box office.

== Reception ==
=== Critical response ===
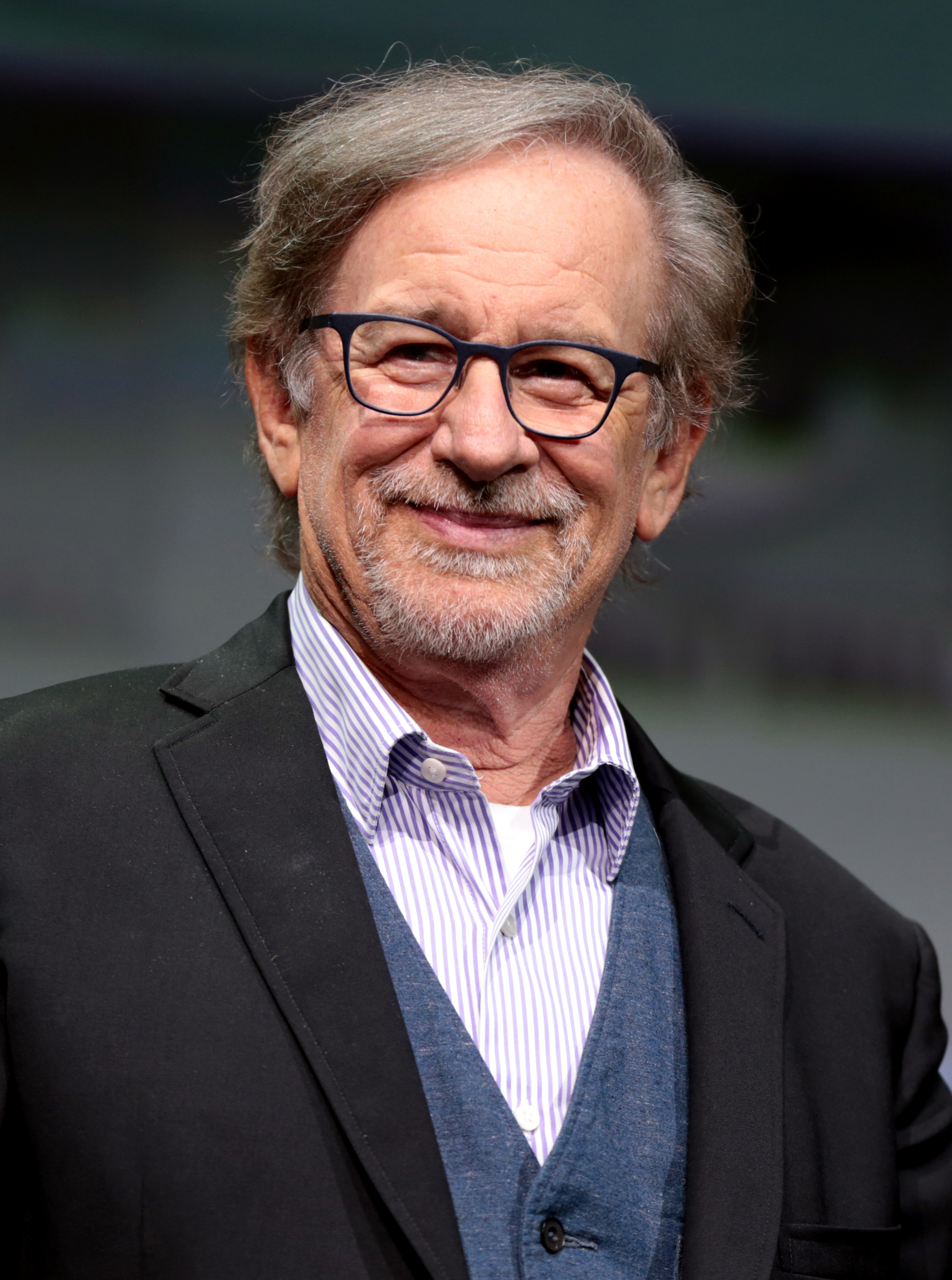
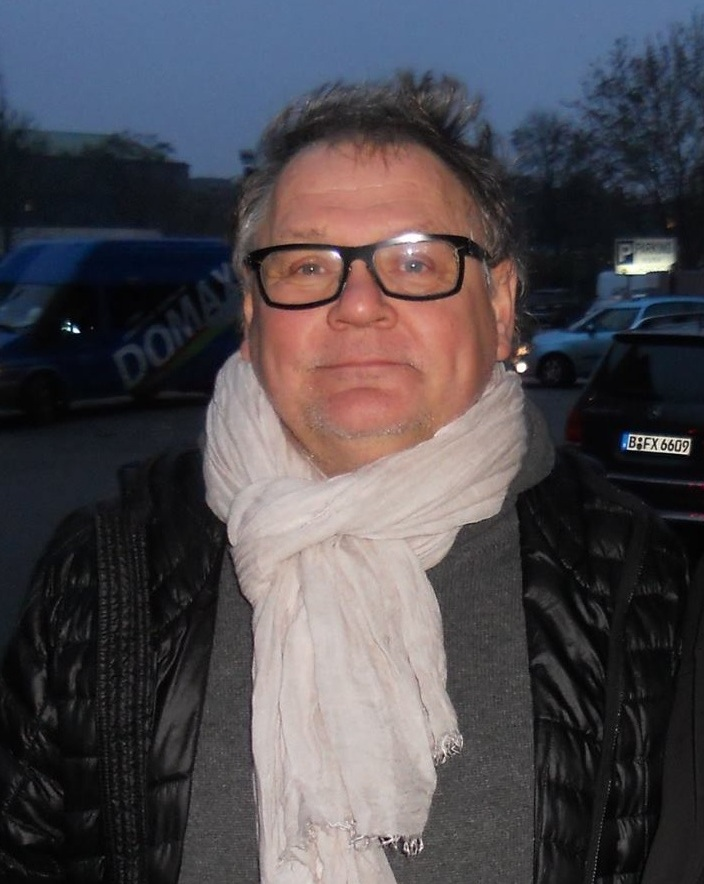
Steven Spielberg (pictured in 2017) and Janusz Kamiński (2014). The pair earned critical acclaim for their respective direction and cinematography of Saving Private Ryan

Saving Private Ryan received critical acclaim, and audiences polled by CinemaScore gave the film an average grade of "A" on an A+ to F scale. Critics generally agreed that Saving Private Ryan presented the grim and brutal reality of the "Good War" in a way previously unseen on film. (Note: Attributed to multiple references:) Writing for the Los Angeles Times, Kenneth Turan described the film as darker and more pessimistic than any of Spielberg's previous works, dispelling the mythos of WWII as staunchly good heroes fighting against evil forces, to depict the reality of combat where, "American soldiers mock virtue and shoot surrendering Germans, where decent and altruistic actions tend to be fatal, where death is random, stupid and redeems hardly anything at all". Some reviewers said this exploration of the limitations of morality in combat asked audiences to consider that the lives lost during the conflict were as valuable as those saved by their sacrifices. Writing for the Chicago Tribune, Gene Siskel lauded the film's ability to discuss the "brutality and madness" of war while "believably" celebrating the sacrifices and courage of those fighting it. Salon.com's Gary Kamiya concluded, "it will forever change the way people imagine the most important event in 20th century history. That is no small achievement." In The New York Times, Stephen Holden said "it's a safe bet that Saving Private Ryan, a powerful but flawed movie, will be revered as a classic decades hence."

Many reviewers focused on the film's two major combat sequences, particularly the opening on Omaha Beach. (Note: Attributed to multiple references:) Focus was on the "horrifying," "visceral," "brutal," "shocking," and "fierce" violence present in the opening battle, described by Entertainment Weekly's Owen Gleiberman and Time's Richard Schickel as one of the most revolutionary film sequences ever made. Roger Ebert of the Chicago Sun-Times and Schickel compared it with the energy and dread of similar scenes in the Vietnam war film Platoon (1986), but with a grander scope depicting masses of men killing each other from afar, drawing the "horror" out of a lengthy, sustained sequence, without allowing the audience to become desensitized. Some reviewers believed that the scene was so impactful and thought-provoking that it overshadowed the rest of the film. Although there was some criticism toward the realistic violence and gore, Turan believed it was done purposely and dispassionately, conveying the chaos and despair experienced by the soldiers, and not done for the sake of entertainment. Spielberg rejected this criticism, affirming he wanted the audience to understand what real combat was like and what the soldiers experienced, not observe it from afar as spectators. Some reviewers believed the concluding battle in Ramelle was more violent than Omaha Beach, particularly the slow death of Mellish as he is stabbed through the chest. The New York Observer's Andrew Sarris criticized the "pornography of violence and cruelty" depicted in severed limbs and rivers of blood.

Turan and Jonathan Rosenbaum found that, outside of the combat, the script was effective but uninspired and derivative of war films by other directors, such as Oliver Stone, Stanley Kubrick, and Francis Ford Coppola. Others criticized "manipulative" oversentimentality, particularly in the modern day framing device featuring the elderly Ryan. Even so, Kamiya described it as "enormously moving, it serves as a kind of redemption, a necessary if eternally fragile answer to the hell he witnessed".

Hanks's performance was generally praised, with some reviewers calling it the best of his career to date. Many reviewers agreed that his everyman persona allowed him to portray Miller with a gentle weariness, empathy, and vulnerability beneath a surface of strength and decency, but also cynicism toward the war. Ebert and Schickel wrote that he offered a quiet reserve "hinting at unspoken competencies" that convince his men and the audience to follow along with him. Turan believed that Hanks's "indelible" performance represented how the audience would hope to be when confronted by the same situations. The other main cast also generally received positive reviews, particularly Davies, with Ebert saying that his transformation from inexperienced interpreter to soldier was the conclusion to "Spielberg's unspoken philosophical argument". (Note: Attributed to multiple references:) Gleiberman and Turan also highlighted the performances of Pepper, Ribisi, and Sizemore, who Turan believed delivered his career's "best, most controlled" performance. Ebert praised the cast for not devolving into cliché or "zany" archetypes and effectively portraying the bonds between them. However, Kamiya wrote that Damon's performance was "jarring", believing both his more cinematic aesthetic and speech about his brothers to be artificial. The review concluded that Ryan was not very compelling, which made it difficult to care about the mission to save him.

=== Accolades ===
At the 56th Golden Globe Awards in 1999, Saving Private Ryan won Best Drama and Best Director (Spielberg), and was nominated for Best Drama Actor (Hanks), Best Original Score (Williams), and Best Screenplay (Rodat). At the 71st Academy Awards, Saving Private Ryan won Best Director (Spielberg), Best Cinematography (Kamiński), Best Film Editing (Kahn), Best Sound (Gary Rydstrom, Gary Summers, Andy Nelson, Ronald Judkins), and Best Sound Effects Editing (Rydstrom and Richard Hymns) while it was nominated for Best Actor (Hanks), Best Original Screenplay (Rodat), Best Music (Williams), Best Production Design (Sanders and Lisa Dean Kavanaugh), and Best Makeup (Lois Burwell, Conor O'Sullivan, Daniel C. Striepeke). Saving Private Ryan's unexpected loss of Best Picture to Shakespeare in Love is seen as one of the biggest upsets in the awards history and led DreamWorks executives to accuse its producers, Miramax, of "overly aggressive campaigning". (Note: Attributed to multiple references:) A 2015 poll of academy voters suggested that, given another opportunity, they would have voted Saving Private Ryan as Best Picture.

At the 52nd British Academy Film Awards, Saving Private Ryan won Best Special Effects and Best Sound, and was nominated for Best Film, Best Direction (Spielberg), and Best Actor (Hanks). At the 25th Saturn Awards, it won Best Action, Adventure, or Thriller Film. The 3rd Golden Satellite Awards also earned the film Best Editing (Kahn), and a nomination for Best Supporting Actor (Sizemore), as well as Best Director (Spielberg) and Best Actor (Hanks) at the Empire Awards.

Saving Private Ryan also won awards for Outstanding Directorial Achievement (Directors Guild of America, Spielberg), Motion Picture Producer of the Year (PGA Awards, Spielberg, Bryce, Gordon, and Levinsohn), Best Casting (Casting Society of America, Denise Chamian), Best Instrumental Composition Written for a Motion Picture (Grammy Awards, Williams), Best Sound Editing for Dialogue (Motion Picture Sound Editors, Hymns, Rydstrom, Sandina Bailo-Lape, Ethan Van der Ryn, Teresa Eckton, Frank Eulner Karen Wilson, Larry Oatfield, and Bruce Lacey), and Sound Effects (Hymns, Rydstrom, Gwendolyn Yates Whittle, Larry Singer, Ewa Sztompke Oatfield, Sara Bolder, Denise Whiting, and Thomas Whiting) and Best of Show - Audiovisual (Key Art Awards). In 2014, the United States Library of Congress selected Saving Private Ryan to be preserved in the National Film Registry as "culturally, historically, or aesthetically significant".

== Post-release ==
=== Historical accuracy and veteran responses ===
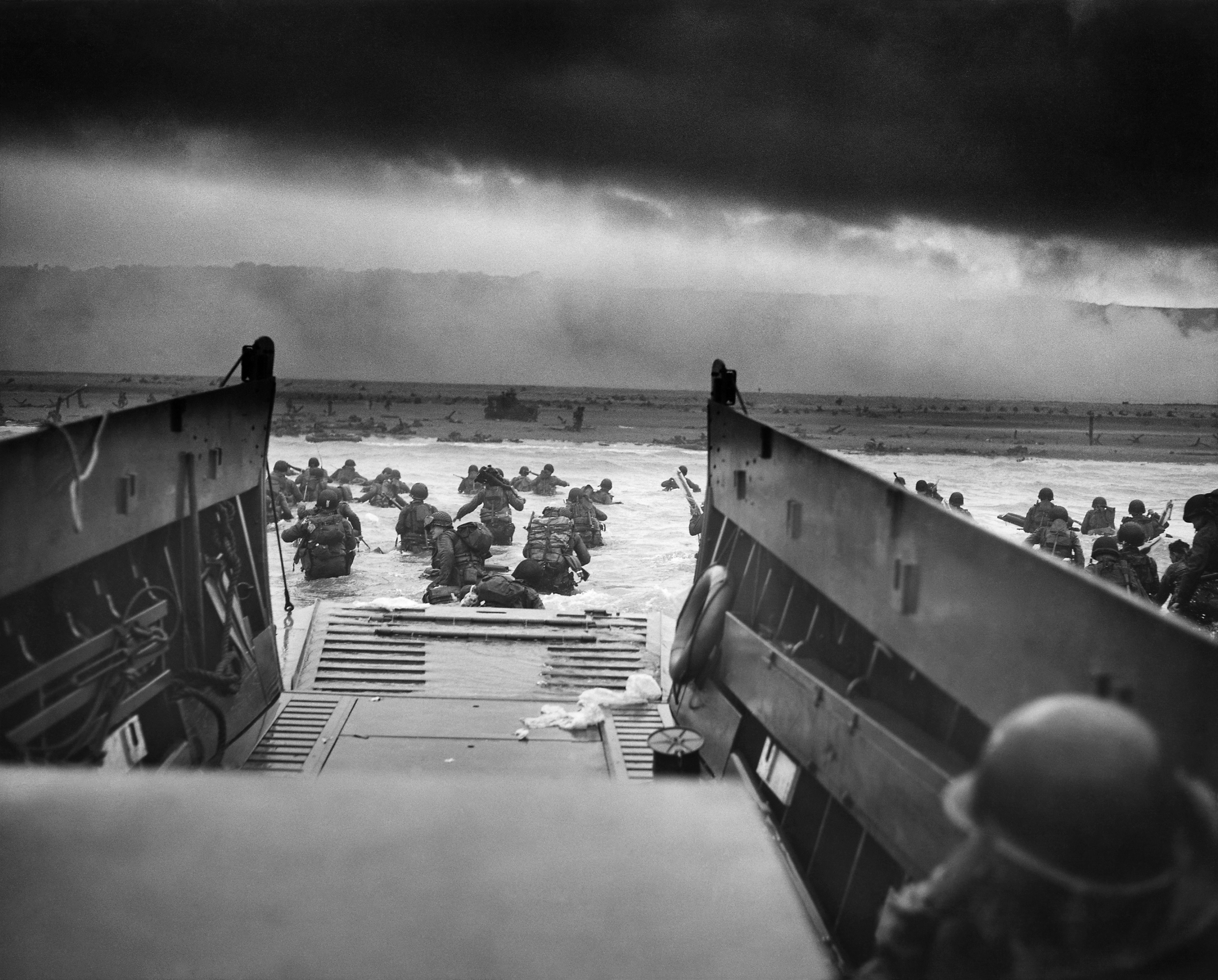
The photograph, Into the Jaws of Death, taken by Robert F. Sargent on June 6, 1944. Saving Private Ryan was lauded for its accurate recreation of the Omaha Beach landings

Several publications highlighted the accuracy of the Omaha Beach assault, down to the sound of gunfire, although some errors were noted, such as bullets killing soldiers underwater, the absence of British coxswains steering the boats, and the battle's truncated duration. Historical curator John Delaney said:

It's accurate for that unit on that bit of that beach on that day ... but you can't say, 'That's what D-Day was like', because it wasn't. Omaha beach is about three and a half miles [5.6 km] long. What's happening at one end of the beach isn't what's happening at the other end.

Discussing the core narrative, Ambrose said, "It's a stretch that they would send eight soldiers, but it could have been hard to find him ... the paratroopers were scattered everywhere."

Many World War II veterans described the opening of Saving Private Ryan as depicting the most realistic representation of combat. Another veteran, interviewed by Time, said "I remember when I walked out into the lobby of the moviehouse, not a single person coming out of that showing said one word ... everybody was stunned by it ... It just brought back so many memories." There were various reports of some veterans being unable to finish watching Saving Private Ryan because of the memories it brought back. (Note: Attributed to multiple references:) The United States Department of Veterans Affairs created a dedicated phoneline for viewers affected by the film, and more veterans visited counselors for post traumatic stress disorder.

The rest of the film is less historically accurate. Fictitious elements include the nonexistent town of Ramelle, the battle associated with it, certain military tactical errors (included for dramatic effect), much of the dialogue, and some of the methods used to locate Ryan. Total Film and some non U.S. veterans were critical of the lack of other Allied forces throughout the film. British broadcaster Channel 4 said that these critics had missed the point of the film, in that it was "unashamedly an American story".

=== Home media ===
Saving Private Ryan was released on VHS in May 1999. It became the most successful rental debut of its time, earning $9.6 million in its first week and $44 million by July 1999. A limited edition two-VHS version was released in November 1999, adding a making-of documentary, as well as a message from Spielberg about D-Day and the National D-Day Museum.

A DVD was released alongside the limited edition VHS, with the same extras. A two-disc Special Collector's Edition DVD set was released in May 2004 to coincide with the 60th anniversary of D-Day. This edition included additional content, including behind-the-scenes content recorded during filming. Spielberg discussed his interest in WWII, the Niland brothers, the story and character development, the cast's boot camp experience, the involvement of the Irish army and locations, the recreation of Omaha Beach, the music, sound effects, and a farewell from Spielberg. This was released alongside a four-disc deluxe "The World War II Collection" DVD package that included a collectible book and two documentaries: Price for Peace (directed by James Moll) about the use of dogs in WWII, and Shooting War (directed by Richard Schickel) about combat photographers, with narration by Hanks.

Saving Private Ryan was released as a two-disc Blu-ray in May 2010, including all previously released special features apart from Price for Peace. Paramount Home Entertainment issued a recall of the Blu-rays after discovering that some versions featured an audio synchronization issue. The defect was fixed in versions re-released later that month. For the film's 20th anniversary in 2018, a three-disc "Commemorative 20th Anniversary" Blu-ray set was released, including a 4K Ultra HD Blu-ray and all previously released features.

=== Other media ===
A novelization, written by Max Allan Collins and Rodat, was released alongside the film. Saving Private Ryan: The Men, the Mission, the Movie : A Film by Steven Spielberg was also released in 1998. It features illustrations, color plates, extracts from the screenplay and Ambrose's works, as well as commentary by crew including Spielberg, Hanks, and Damon.

== Thematic analysis ==
=== Patriotism ===
Leading into the early 21st century, there was renewed focus in America on glorifying the generation that had fought in WWII, depicted in films such as Saving Private Ryan and The Thin Red Line, the miniseries Band of Brothers (2001), books such as The Greatest Generation (1998), and construction of a World War II Memorial in Washington, D.C. (Note: Attributed to multiple references:) Many publications believed this resurgence of interest in the war to be a response to decades of American cynicism toward the nation's failure in the Vietnam War (1955–1975), and anticlimactic victories in the Cold and Gulf Wars that resulted in little diplomatic success or celebration. (Note: Attributed to multiple references:)

Many films about the Vietnam War depicted its American combatants as self-hating, "deeply troubled, or even psychotic," offered little respect, and portrayed the conflict itself as one mired in dread, anxiety, and general negativity. Literature professor Marzena Sokołowska-Paryż described the portrayal of World War II as "the last Good War" and its veterans as the "greatest generation" as a form of "therapeutic patriotism". She argued that this framing rehabilitated the image of American soldiers by presenting World War II veterans as an enduring model of national identity, while helping suppress lingering guilt associated with the Vietnam War. Film scholar Albert Auster described this as a reversal of earlier attitudes, noting that through the early 1990s historical wars, including World War II, were still subject to criticism and that, particularly in response to the Vietnam War, literary critics had sought to challenge the idea of World War II as the "Good War". Saving Private Ryan is American-centric, beginning and ending with an image of the nation's flag fluttering in the wind, a desaturated image suggesting a nostalgic image of "the deep pride we once felt in our flag". Stephen Holden described it as "a wholehearted celebration of American pluck and virtue and honor".

Holden and Ebert disagreed with the view of some critics that Saving Private Ryan's "harrowing" and realistic combat scenes were a statement against war. They wrote that it accepts war as a necessity and portrays its main characters not as symbols, but as real people trying to kill the enemy without getting themselves killed. The scenes of the elderly Ryan visiting Miller's grave with his family received some criticism. Author John Biguenet queried how such a "savage and unsentimental film" could conclude with a scene so sentimentalized. Spielberg said in making the film he was meant to "wave the flag and be patriotic," but that the reality of his father's experiences made him want to also convey the harsh reality. The Omaha Beach landing establishes the distance between the commanders safe at home who order Ryan be rescued, and the soldiers endangered in doing so. It is a sentimental mission intended to spare one family the grief of losing all of its sons, but Miller refers to it as a public relations scheme designed to boost civilian morale. General Marshall quotes a letter by Abraham Lincoln to a similarly affected family, but where Lincoln's letter expresses sentiment and patriotic sacrifice to the mother, it is not sentimental nor does it claim that her grief is greater than any other mother who lost her child at war. Biguenet said Marshall, in comparison, confuses sentimentality for morality.

Despite the patriotic American imagery, the characters of Saving Private Ryan do not discuss their home country or protecting democracy from fascism. The soldiers are only concerned with returning home to their loved ones. Miller's men openly state that they do not care about Ryan, but Miller says that he will go into metaphorical Hell to save him, if it means Miller can return to his wife. The soldiers actively fighting are not sentimental about their mission.

Turan and Biguenet said Saving Private Ryan "feels like an official act of atonement" for modern generations failing to acknowledge the "courage and sacrifice" of WWII soldiers. When Miller tells Ryan to "earn this," he is effectively speaking about the debt owed to veterans who made "the ultimate sacrifice" for their country. Biguenet called this a "terrible, impossible order", a moral burden that Ryan will carry until his own death because there is no way to compensate the high price paid by Miller's men. Spielberg suggested the answer was in the living paying homage to the fallen soldiers and the freedom for which they fought. History professor John Bodnar described the image of the Normandy American Cemetery and Memorial as depicting a national unity with row after row of white grave markers, serving as a permanent reminder "to other nations of the sacrifices made by the United States".

=== Morality and humanity ===
Unlike some older WWII films that portrayed the soldiers as infallible heroes, Saving Private Ryan presents battles fought by brave but frightened civilians, the majority of whom at Omaha Beach were not combat veterans. Ebert believed much of the audience, including himself, would identify with Upham, someone completely unprepared for the realities of war but who must fight regardless. Miller is the opposite: an experienced soldier who is scared and anxious because he knows exactly what to expect and is haunted by his responsibility for the lives of his men. Although 94 men have died under his command, Miller rationalizes that he can prioritize his mission over his men because each sacrifice was responsible for saving many more lives. However, his mission to rescue Ryan demands he risk the lives of several men to save just one. Turan said Miller's trembling hands were a sign that he is "dangerously close to coming apart". Far Out magazine wrote that the focus on Miller's ailment acknowledges the side effects of war such as post-traumatic stress disorder, something he suppresses to fulfil his duty.

Spielberg said the mission to rescue Ryan cannot be morally or patriotically justified, risking eight lives to save one. This theme is reinforced when they encounter the sole survivor of a glider crash caused by heavy steel shielding added to protect a single general on board, resulting in 22 deaths. No character claims that the mission of Miller and his men is heroic, and the men express the grief their own mothers will feel should they be killed on this endeavor. The "toughest" soldier, Horvath, gives it meaning when he tells Miller that saving Ryan could be the one decent thing they can accomplish in "this whole godawful, shitty mess". Biguenet said that Spielberg is explicitly condemning their mission as an immoral act to force upon soldiers. Ebert considered the decision to deviate from the mission to attack the German gun nest on the way to Ramelle to be a deliberate rebellion against their orders. The action is not part of their mission and it is possible to avoid the situation entirely, but it grants the soldiers the opportunity to do what they came to Europe for: to fight a war. Hanks said the decision to stay with Ryan and defend Ramelle was the characters "bringing meaning to a situation that until then had been absurd".

While film critic Andrew Sarris found the German characters to match evil archetypes found in other WWII films, concluding with Upham's lesson that Steamboat Willie should have been killed earlier, Saving Private Ryan does not portray the Allied soldiers as unimpeachable heroes. Following Omaha Beach, two Allied soldiers laugh as they execute two pleading German soldiers, but the soldiers are speaking Czech, indicating they are potentially from German-conquered Czechoslovakia, forcibly conscripted into the war effort. Biguenet wrote that the Germans are not portrayed as any worse than the Americans, as they are similarly affected by the horrors of war and casually execute downed American soldiers. In Saving Private Ryan, allegiances do not matter, all men are equal, and rules only matter until they conflict with the mission objective.

Upham's transformation from cowardly interpreter to Willie's executioner shows the transformative realities of combat. William J. Prior and Auster wrote that Upham represents respect for human life and moral decency when he interferes to prevent Steamboat Willie's execution, despite the fact that it would protect the mission. He offers the intellectual perspective of a civilian, but his lack of combat experience makes him unable to kill the prisoner, which results in the deaths of many of his allies. Miller's experience means he is conscious of the risk involved in releasing Willie, but he is simultaneously struggling to cling to his own humanity and decency, believing that every time he kills he is moving "farther from home". Although Willie is the enemy, he is also a human with his own right to exist, and summarily executing him would further distance Miller from the self he and his wife knew. His decision to spare Willie and reveal his civilian background, returns to him a semblance of his humanity.

== Legacy ==
=== Cultural influence ===
Saving Private Ryan was credited with renewing interest in World War II leading into the 21st century. NBC News wrote that in presenting audiences with its "stomach-churning violence and soul-shaking intensity of that pivotal chapter in the war", the film had reshaped the United States' "cultural memory". It is regarded as one of the most accurate and realistic war films ever made, particularly for the opening Omaha Beach battle. Film historian Steven Jay Rubin said, "It was a game-changer ... it was devastatingly dramatic, visceral, immersive. I didn't touch my popcorn because it felt sacrilegious to eat while I'm watching it." Even so, director and Vietnam War veteran Oliver Stone claimed that Saving Private Ryan depicted a "worship" of WWII as "the good war" that, alongside films such as Gladiator (2000) and Black Hawk Down, made audiences more in favor of war: "By the time of the Iraq War, we were ready to go back." American academic Paul Fussell similarly decried Saving Private Ryan for providing an "honest, harrowing, 15-minute opening" of Omaha Beach before descending into more broadly acceptable action-adventure fare. He said, "Its genre was pure cowboys and Indians, with the virtuous cowboys of course victorious."

The film is considered to have had a lasting influence on filmmaking, particularly its opening battle scenes. (Note: Attributed to multiple references:) Vanity Fair wrote, "no films about combat made since would look the way they do without the de-saturated, handheld, blood-splatters-and-all horror of cinema that is this extended sequence ... it's a terrifying scene, either honorable or exploitative in its all vérité, depending on whom you ask. Regardless of any moral assessment, it's easily one of the most aped and referenced scenes of the late 20th century." Saving Private Ryan was named by other directors as an influence, such as Quentin Tarantino (Inglourious Basterds, 2009), Christopher Nolan (Dunkirk, 2017), and Robert Altman. (Note: Attributed to multiple references:) The Los Angeles Times wrote that Saving Private Ryan's stylistic choices, such as placing the audience close to the on-screen action, can be seen in war and action media that followed. This includes films such as Gladiator (2000), Enemy at the Gates, Pearl Harbor (both 2001), Flags of Our Fathers (2006), Hacksaw Ridge (2016), the "psychological anguish" of American Sniper (2014), and modern superhero films. Cinematographer Oren Soffer cited the film's battle sequences as an influence on those in Gareth Edwards' science fiction film The Creator (2023), for which he served as co-cinematographer with Greig Fraser. This influence extends to television, with shows such as Game of Thrones ("The Spoils of War", 2017) and The Pacific (2010). Saving Private Ryan is also seen as an influence on video games. Spielberg and DreamWorks developed Medal of Honor (1999) to translate the realism and setting of Saving Private Ryan. Its success launched a series of Medal of Honor games, which, in turn, contributed to the creation of the Call of Duty series.

=== Retrospective reception ===
Saving Private Ryan is considered one of the greatest war films ever made. (Note: Attributed to multiple references:) In a 2018 interview, Spielberg said, "I didn't anticipate the success of the movie ... in very early screenings, certain associates and other people in my life were saying that I made it too tough. I feared that almost nobody would see it because the word of mouth would spread quickly after the first 25 minutes."

In 2007, the American Film Institute (AFI) listed Saving Private Ryan as 71st-greatest American film. The AFI listed it among the most thrilling, inspiring, and epic American films. A 2014 poll of 2,120 entertainment industry professionals by The Hollywood Reporter ranked Saving Private Ryan as the 46th-best film. Publications such as Parade and Variety named it one of the greatest films of all time. (Note: Attributed to multiple references:) Saving Private Ryan is included in the 2013 film reference book 1001 Movies You Must See Before You Die, and it is listed on Rotten Tomatoes' 300 essential movies. The film is generally considered to be among the best of Spielberg's works, (Note: Attributed to multiple references:) and of Hanks's credits. (Note: Attributed to multiple references:) In a 2025 retrospective by Vulture, Saving Private Ryan was listed among the best movies to have not won the Best Picture Academy Award.

On Rotten Tomatoes, the film holds a 94% approval rating across 148 critics, with an average score of 8.7/10. The consensus reads; "Anchored by another winning performance from Tom Hanks, Steven Spielberg's unflinchingly realistic war film virtually redefines the genre." The film has a score of 91 out of 100 on Metacritic, based on 38 critics, indicating "universal acclaim". Saving Private Ryan has remained popular with audiences, with reader and viewer-ranked polling listing it as one of the greatest war films, among the greatest films of the 1990s, and the greatest films of all time.
