= Strays (1997 film) =

- Film poster
- Directed by: Vin Diesel
- Written by: Vin Diesel
- Produced by: Gordon Bijelonic; Vin Diesel; T.J. Mancini; Jean Claude Nedelic; Robert Panaro; John Sale; Stephen Schmidt; Jill Silverthorne; George Zakk; Robert Bigelow
- Starring: Vin Diesel; Suzanne Lanza; Joey Dedio; F. Valentino Morales; Mike Epps; T.K. Kirkland; Darnell Williams
- Cinematography: Andrew Dunn
- Music by: Julius Robinson
- Distributed by: First Look International
- Release date: January 18, 1997 (Sundance)
- Running time: 105 minutes
- Country: United States
- Language: English
- Budget: $47,000 (approx.)

Strays is a 1997 American drama film written, co-produced, directed by, and starring Vin Diesel. It follows a drug dealer and hustler who is fed up with the repetitious lifestyle he leads and begins looking for meaning in his life. It marked Diesel's feature film directing debut and takes a hard look at his own adolescence and upbringing in New York City. The film premiered at the 1997 Sundance Film Festival.

== Synopsis ==
Frustrated by the repetitious grind of one-night stands and aimless hustling, Rick is looking for meaning in his life. Like his testosterone-tweaked buddies, Rick is a stray looking for a traditional family structure and wrestling unconsciously with his own father's absence. He sells small amounts of marijuana to cover the expenses of his own use but insists that he is not doing it for a living.

When he meets Heather, the girl next door, he suddenly perceives a new avenue and an opportunity for a new, committed relationship. Trying to assimilate into Heather's world, Rick takes heat from his perpetually adolescent cohorts whose ambitions are restricted to riding fast, toking slow, and ditching hard. Though the chemistry between the couple is immediately charged, Rick's street chic and volatile aggression threaten to extinguish their relationship before it has ever begun.

== Cast ==
- Vin Diesel as Rick
- Suzanne Lanza as Heather
- Joey Dedio as Fred
- F. Valentino Morales as Tony
- Mike Epps as Mike
- T.K. Kirkland as Rodney
- Darnell Williams as Keith
- Mihaela Tudorof as Danielle
- Eugene Osborne Smith as Willie
- Temple Brooks as Amy
- Freddie Pendavis as Arthur

== Production ==
Diesel drew inspiration for the film from his own upbringing in New York City. The film helped Diesel secure a role in Saving Private Ryan after director Steven Spielberg viewed it.

The film was shot in 16 mm.

== Reception ==
On review aggregator Rotten Tomatoes, the film holds a score of 40% based on five reviews, with an average rating of 5.1/10. Emanuel Levy of Variety described the film as "amiable and intermittently engaging," but also "a derivative film, a 'hanging-out' yarn that charts the familiar territory of such American movies as Mean Streets, Saturday Night Fever and Diner."
