= Gay Abel-Bey =

American director

Gay Abel-Bey is an American film director, producer, writer, editor, and academic. She currently teaches at New York University.

== Early life and education ==
Abel-Bey earned her B.A. from Mount Holyoke College, as well as her M.F.A. in Film from UCLA. In 1991, she made her thesis film Fragrance, which earned her the Dorothy Arzner Award for "high recognition of dramatic piece by a woman." While in graduate school at UCLA's School of Theater, Film, and Television, Abel-Bey taught courses in screenwriting and production. In her time at UCLA, Abel-Bey worked with ABC's Television Lighting Director Leslie Zak to produce and direct an instructional video in television lighting, and conducted a lighting seminar for film as well as producing three more instructional videos retained at the UCLA archives.

== Career ==
Abel-Bey was involved with Filmex, a Los Angeles film festival, and co-hosted a retrospective for the National Film School of London. She also helped to develop a community-based documentary workshop for at-risk youth in Los Angeles via Cal State LA's media department. Additionally, Abel-Bey has produced a variety of other film projects, some of which include Father & Son, Running 4 My Life, When It's Your Turn for WPVI-TV, Stone Cold Hustler, and Kiss Grandmother Goodbye. Father & Son was awarded a Sonny Innovators Award, while Stone Cold Hustler was awarded a local Emmy Award in Washington, D.C. for the "Drug Free School Zone" campaign.

In 1995 Abel-Bey started teaching at New York University, and as of 2023 she continues to work there as an Academic Advisor for the Undergraduate Division of Film & Television, teaching courses in production and screenwriting. As a teaching assistant, Abel-Bey taught the Remote Television Workshop and Sports Broadcasting & Intermediate Television Production.

== Filmography ==
Year	Title	Contribution	Notes
1977	Daydream Therapy	Acting role	
1980	Happy Valentine's Day	Director and writer	
1991	Fragrance	Director, producer, writer, and editor	Served as her thesis film

Additional works include:

- Father & Son
- Running 4 My Life
- When It's Your Turn
- Stone Cold Hustler
- Kiss Grandmother Goodbye

== Awards ==
- Dorothy Arzner Award
- Sonny Innovators Award
- Local Emmy Award
