= LUV (film) =

2012 film directed by Sheldon Candis

- Directed by: Sheldon Candis
- Written by: Sheldon Candis; Justin Wilson
- Produced by: Jason Michael Berman; Gordon Bijelonic; Derek Dudle; W. Michael Jenson; Joel Newton; Datari Turner
- Starring: Common; Michael Rainey Jr. Charles S. Dutton; Meagan Good; Marc John Jefferies; Lonette McKee; Michael K. Williams; Tracey Heggins; Clark Johnson; Russell Hornsby; Sammi Rotibi; Dennis Haysbert; Danny Glover
- Cinematography: Gavin Kelly
- Edited by: Jeff Wishengrad
- Music by: Nuno Malo
- Production companies: Film Forward Independent; Gordon Bijelonic/Datari Turner Films; Freedom Road Entertainment; TideRock Films; ZHI Media; Taggart Productions; Cinephile Academy; Hollywood Studios International; Rival Pictures
- Distributed by: Indomina Releasing
- Release dates: January 23, 2012 (Sundance Film Festival); January 18, 2013
- Running time: 94 minutes
- Country: United States
- Language: English
- Box office: $156,996

LUV is a 2012 crime drama film directed by Sheldon Candis. It was nominated for the Grand Jury Prize at the 2012 Sundance Film Festival. LUV was shot in and around Baltimore, Maryland, and had its Baltimore premiere at the Maryland Film Festival 2012. It was later released in theaters on January 18, 2013. The film has received mixed reviews from critics.

== Plot ==
The film begins with Woody Watson (Michael Rainey Jr.) having a dream about himself and his mother in the woods, but then he wakes up. Woody lives with his grandmother (Lonette McKee) in the inner city of Baltimore and longs to be reunited with his mother, who is in rehab in North Carolina. His charismatic uncle Vincent (Common) has recently returned home after having served 12 years of a 20-year sentence. He is determined to straighten out his life by opening a high-end crab shack. When Vincent drops Woody off at school, he notices Woody becomes embarrassed when a girl looks at him, so Vincent decides to give the boy instruction in how to become a man.

After the duo get Woody a tailored suit, they take a trip to see Cofield (Charles S. Dutton), Vincent's friend, old crime partner, and now owner of a crab shack, who tells Vincent his old crime boss, Mr. Fish (Dennis Haysbert), is looking for him.

Vincent and Woody head to the bank to sign off on the loan Vincent needs to fulfill his dreams. Unfortunately, the bank officer tells him he needs another $22,000 to start his business. With no one to turn to but his former associates, including Mr. Fish and Mr. Fish's brother Arthur (Danny Glover), Vincent reluctantly agrees to do one more drug deal for Mr. Fish as a demonstration of loyalty to him.

Vincent takes Woody with him around town as he tries to do everything he can to complete Mr. Fish's deal. Along the way, Vincent teaches him how to drive and use a gun.

The pair then meet with a client, Jamison, at his place to arrange a deal. Tensions escalate, leading to a fight between Jamison and Vincent; Vincent commands Woody to fire his gun, but Woody freezes up, forcing Vincent to kill Jamison himself.

While driving away from Jamison's, an enraged Vincent yells at Woody, and the two get into a heated argument in which Vincent claims Woody's mother does not want him. Upset and angry, Woody bolts from the car and runs to the train station hoping to get a ride to North Carolina to see his mother. Vincent stops him, and Woody decides to go home, but Vincent tells him, "We ain't got no home." Vincent then convinces Woody to help him complete the drug deal and promises to take him to North Carolina one day.

The two go to the lake to meet up with Cofield. Although they hope to meet next with a drug dealer named Enoch, Cofield believes it is too risky. Woody comes up with a plan to reduce the risk. When they get to Enoch's, his henchmen surround them, but the deal goes off without any problems. The pair then go to visit Beverly (Meagan Good), Vincent's old girlfriend, now with a new boyfriend and pregnant with his child. Furious, Vincent beats up Beverly's boyfriend and drives off with Woody.

The pair then meet Mr. Fish and Arthur at their mansion for dinner. However, things take a turn for the worse. Vincent reveals how mad he is at Mr. Fish that the last drug deal he had used Vincent for, got Vincent locked up, and here he is again, doing another deal, one in which he wound up murdering Jamison. Pulling out his gun, Vincent hits Arthur with it to knock him out and aims it at Mr. Fish.

Mr. Fish then reveals that it was Vincent who got Woody's mother hooked on drugs. An anguished Woody pulls out a gun and aims it at Vincent. Arthur then grabs a rifle and shoots Vincent, who, still alive, shoots Arthur fatally. Woody grabs his backpack and runs outside just as Vincent kills Mr. Fish.

Woody runs into the woods with a critically wounded Vincent right behind him; Woody then sees him and tries to help him escape. Having lost too much blood, Vincent falls over and dies in Woody's arms. Woody cries just as the police arrive. Taken into custody by Detectives Holloway and Pratt (Michael K. Williams & Russell Hornsby), Woody finds himself involved in a triple homicide, but he will not be charged. As he drives Woody home, Holloway tells him he and his grandmother will be brought in for questioning at 10 a.m. the next day.

Well before 10 a.m., Woody takes a cab to the crime scene. He makes his way into the woods to a particular tree, where a flashback reveals he buried some of the drug deal money. He takes it and drives off in Vincent's car. Back at home, his grandmother walks into the kitchen, where she finds money Woody left in her Bible. As Woody drives off (presumably to North Carolina), he says in a voiceover, "My Uncle Vincent said that there are two types of people: owners and renters. But the real question is, what will you own?" While having another vision of himself and his mother in the woods, he begins to choke up, and the movie ends.

== Cast ==
- Common as Vincent
- Michael Rainey Jr. as Woody Watson
- Dennis Haysbert as Mr. Fish
- Danny Glover as Arthur
- Lonette McKee as Grandma
- Charles S. Dutton as Cofield
- Meagan Good as Beverly
- Marz Lovejoy as Angel
- Marc John Jefferies as Newt
- Michael K. Williams as Detective Holloway
- Tracey Heggins as Leslie
- Clark Johnson as Harold Barnes
- Russell Hornsby as Detective Pratt
- Sammi Rotibi as Jamison

== Reception ==
On review aggregator website Rotten Tomatoes, the film holds an approval rating of 35% based on 40 reviews, with an average rating of 5.2/10. On Metacritic, the film has a weighted average score of 52 out of 100, based on 21 critics, indicating "mixed or average" reviews.

Owen Gleiberman of Entertainment Weekly gave the film a C−, writing, "The actor and rapper Common has become a highly skilled screen star, but this touchy-feely dud does him wrong... The first sign that something is off in the movie is when Vincent decides to give his kid nephew (Michael Rainey Jr.) a lesson in thug life. The second is that the director, Sheldon Candis, can't decide if that's a good thing. No wonder every scene wobbles around."

== See also ==
- List of hood films
