= Backwash (The Wire) =

- The Wire episode
- Episode no.: Season 2 Episode 7
- Directed by: Thomas J. Wright
- Story by: David Simon; Rafael Alvarez
- Teleplay by: Rafael Alvarez
- Original air date: July 13, 2003
- Running time: 58 minutes

Episode chronology
| ← Previous "All Prologue" | Next → "Duck and Cover" |
- The Wire season 2

"Backwash" is the seventh episode of the second season of the HBO original series The Wire. The episode was written by Rafael Alvarez from a story by David Simon & Rafael Alvarez and was directed by Thomas J. Wright. It originally aired on July 13, 2003.

== Plot ==
Bunk and Beadie meet with Landsman to discuss their using a computer to monitor dock traffic. Landsman is initially outraged until he learns that Daniels has granted them space in his detail's off-site location. Before storming out, he speculates that Daniels might take the Jane Doe case, which would relieve Homicide of the uncleared murders. Rawls later tries to persuade Daniels to take the Jane Does, but Daniels stands firm. Later, in an argument with Marla, Daniels defends his decision to stay in the Baltimore Police Department and tells her he is "playing their game" from now on.

Greggs and Prez follow up on the information from a friend of Shardene's and find a strip club employing Eastern European dancers. They watch as the girls leave the club and file into a van, which they follow to an apartment building. Meanwhile, Herc and Carver borrow an expensive surveillance bug to get information on the portside drug trade, allowing the clerk to hold Carver's credit card as collateral. They place the bug in a tennis ball and have some success monitoring Frog. However, when Nick arrives, Frog distractedly tosses the ball into the busy street, where it is crushed by a truck. Herc and Carver later plan to fraudulently claim to work with an informant to recoup the cost of the bug.

Beadie and Freamon continue to monitor drug trafficking through the port. When they note that Horseface will be working a ship, they call in Greggs and Prez for help with surveillance. Soon enough, Beadie sees him "lose" a container, which they follow to an east side warehouse. There, they photograph Sergei meeting with Proposition Joe. Meanwhile, McNulty tries to rekindle his relationship with Elena, who admits she can never trust him again. The detail persuades Daniels to take on the Jane Doe murders, with Daniels informing Rawls that he's willing to do so in exchange for Rawls giving him everything he asks. However, Marla expresses anger that Daniels has abandoned his career ambitions.

Nick sets himself up as a supplier to Frog and gives Ziggy his share of their first drug profits. Frank attends a seminar on robotic dock technology and is appalled when he realizes the automated systems threaten to make stevedores obsolete. He pleads with Nat to let him extend his term as union treasurer for another year. Frank also confronts the union's lobbyist, Bruce DiBiago, and expresses frustration that his efforts have failed to make political headway. Frank demands that Bruce work the politicians harder to get the canal dredged. After a stevedore named New Charles suffers a severe leg injury on the job, Frank delivers an envelope stuffed with cash to his family. Nat pointedly asks where the money comes from. Refusing to answer, Frank walks away.

Bodie buys a floral arrangement for D'Angelo's funeral and orders it to resemble the tower he controlled before his demotion. Stringer visits Brianna's house for D'Angelo's wake and finds her inconsolable. In prison, Avon and Wee-Bey discuss D'Angelo's "suicide," unaware that Stringer engineered the murder. Despite being despondent, Avon musters enough anger to dismiss D'Angelo as weak for killing himself. After the funeral, Joe approaches Stringer to discuss sharing his supply for a share in the Barksdales' territory. Stringer pragmatically agrees to present the idea to Avon during his next visit. When he does so, Avon angrily dismisses it out of hand.

== Production ==
=== Epigraph ===
Don't worry, kid. You're still on the clock.

— Horseface

Horseface makes this statement to the recently severely injured New Charles while the stevedores wait for the ambulance.

=== Writing ===
This episode was written by Rafael Alvarez, who previously worked with series creator David Simon at The Baltimore Sun. In a 2007 New Yorker profile of Simon, Margaret Talbot found that Alvarez showed an "eye for Baltimore detail", for instance including a picture of Robert Irsay on a dartboard in Frank's office. Irsay was the owner of the former Baltimore Colts, who, in 1984, took the team to Indianapolis.

=== Music ===
- The singer at D'Angelo's funeral sings "Jesus on the Mainline"
- The song playing repeatedly on the bar jukebox when Ziggy and Nick are talking about a supposed paternity suit against Ziggy is "Love Child" by Diana Ross & the Supremes.

=== Credits ===
Although credited, Paul Ben-Victor does not appear in this episode. Also, due to D'Angelo Barksdale having been killed off, Larry Gilliard, Jr. is no longer credited.

==== Guest stars ====
1. Seth Gilliam as Detective Ellis Carver
2. Domenick Lombardozzi as Detective Thomas "Herc" Hauk
3. Jim True-Frost as Detective Roland "Prez" Pryzbylewski
4. James Ransone as Ziggy Sobotka
5. Pablo Schreiber as Nick Sobotka
6. Callie Thorne as Elena McNulty
7. J.D. Williams as Preston "Boadie" Broadus
8. Hassan Johnson as Roland "Wee-Bey" Brice
9. Kristin Proctor as Aimee
10. Michael Hyatt as Brianna Barksdale
11. Robert F. Chew as Proposition Joe
12. Maria Broom as Marla Daniels
13. Lance Irwin as Maui
14. Delaney Williams as Sergeant Jay Landsman
15. Shamyl Brown as Donette
16. Keith Flippen as Bruce DiBiago (as "Keith Flippan")
17. Gary "D.Reign" as Frog
18. Tray Chaney as Malik "Poot" Carr
19. Luray Cooper as Nat Coxson
20. Charley Scalies as Thomas "Horseface" Pakusa
21. Stan Stewart as New Charles

==== Uncredited appearances ====
- Richard Burton as Sean "Shamrock" McGinty
- Richard Pelzman as Little Big Roy
- Kelvin Davis as La La
- Chris Ashworth as Sergei Malatov
- Ted Feldman as George "Double G" Glekas
- Jeffrey Pratt Gordon as Johnny "Fifty" Spamanto
- Curtis L. McClarin as florist
- Jacques Derosena as Leech
- Randall Boffman as Bill Anderson - administrator for the port of Baltimore

== Reception ==
In a 2009 review for The Star-Ledger, Alan Sepinwall praised the acting of Idris Elba for showing "Stringer always thinking, always calculating the angles in any encounter". For The Guardian, Steve Busfield quoted a blog commenter perceiving "an unusually cynical view of...female characters" in this episode.
