= One Arrest =

- The Wire episode
- Episode no.: Season 1 Episode 7
- Directed by: Joe Chappelle
- Story by: David Simon; Ed Burns
- Teleplay by: Rafael Alvarez
- Original air date: July 21, 2002
- Running time: 59 minutes

Episode chronology
← Previous "The Wire"	Next → "Lessons"
- The Wire season 1

"One Arrest" is the seventh episode of the first season of the American crime drama The Wire. It originally premiered on July 21, 2002, on HBO. "One Arrest" was written by Rafael Alvarez from a story by David Simon and Ed Burns, and was directed by Joe Chappelle. In the episode, police detective Jimmy McNulty continues to wiretap the Barksdale Organization, while being unknowingly undermined by commanding officer William Rawls.

On its premiere, "One Arrest" had over four million viewers. The Guardian and The Star-Ledger praised the episode's storytelling and character depth. This episode marked the debut of Isiah Whitlock Jr. in the cast as State Senator Clay Davis.

== Plot summary ==
Prez surprises the detail by successfully decrypting coded pager messages used by the Barksdale Organization, allowing police to identify the time and location of a drug resupply. Herc, Carver, Sydnor and Greggs arrest the courier but deliberately let Stinkum escape to avoid exposing the wiretap. When Stinkum pages Stringer from outside the towers, Sydnor photographs him as Stringer returns the call, securing the legal grounds to monitor their conversations. During interrogation, Prez recognizes the courier as Kevin Johnston, the boy he previously blinded in one eye. Daniels urges Johnston to contact him if he wants a better life, but Johnston mocks the offer.

McNulty and Pearlman meet with Phelan, who agrees to support the investigation. Phelan is surprised by Daniels' defense of the wiretaps and worries McNulty no longer trusts him after the Gant murder became public. Meanwhile, Daniels attends a fundraiser where State Senator Clay Davis' driver, Damien "Day-Day" Price, casually discusses the profits of robbing the event before learning Daniels is a police officer.

Rawls pressures Santangelo to inform on McNulty if he wishes to remain in Homicide. Desperate, Santangelo follows Landsman's joking suggestion to consult a psychic. McNulty and Bunk investigate Gant's murder using information from Omar that Bird was involved, finding a witness who supports Omar's account. The detail then arrests Bird, and ballistics testing confirms his gun was used in the killing. After Bird refuses to cooperate, he is beaten by Daniels, Landsman and Greggs. Omar later provides information to Bunk that solves one of Santangelo's cold cases; McNulty relays the information to Santangelo. Grateful, Santangelo warns McNulty that Rawls is targeting him. Concerned, McNulty turns to Pearlman as he prepares to resist Rawls' influence.

Greggs arranges for Johnny's possession charge to be dropped as a favor to Bubbles, on the condition that Johnny enters a treatment program. Bubbles and Johnny later attend a Narcotics Anonymous meeting. Inspired by the meeting's speaker, Walon, Bubbles leaves feeling hopeful and admits he has a strong desire to live.

D'Angelo visits Avon at Orlando's club, where Orlando later approaches him with a risky proposition: selling cocaine without Avon's knowledge. D'Angelo refuses to commit immediately. Meanwhile, Stringer reprimands Stinkum for careless phone use and warns that something may be wrong within D'Angelo's crew. Avon orders D'Angelo to suspend operations temporarily and worries that police have not yet connected Stinkum to his vehicle during Kevin's arrest, suggesting something unusual is happening. Back in the Pit, Bodie quizzes Poot about Wallace, who has isolated himself and turned to drugs following Brandon's murder. Growing increasingly cautious, Stringer orders the payphones in the Pit to be removed; he instructs his crew to vary the phones they use and never use the same one twice in a day, in an effort to avoid police surveillance.

== Production ==
=== Epigraph ===
A man must have a code. - Bunk

Bunk uses this phrase when Omar discusses his rules for life on the street.

=== Credits ===
==== Guest stars ====
- Peter Gerety as Judge Daniel Phelan
- Seth Gilliam as Detective Ellis Carver
- Domenick Lombardozzi as Detective Thomas "Herc" Hauk
- Clarke Peters as Detective Lester Freamon
- Jim True-Frost as Detective Roland "Prez" Pryzbylewski
- Leo Fitzpatrick as Johnny Weeks
- J. D. Williams as Preston "Boadie" Broadus
- Hassan Johnson as Roland "Wee-Bey" Brice
- Corey Parker Robinson as Detective Leander Sydnor
- Steve Earle as Walon
- Michael B. Jordan as Wallace
- Michael K. Williams as Omar Little
- Maria Broom as Marla Daniels
- Michael Salconi as Detective Michael Santangelo
- Delaney Williams as Sergeant Jay Landsman
- Tray Chaney as Malik "Poot" Carr
- Clayton LeBouef as Wendell "Orlando" Blocker
- Brandon Price as Anton "Stinkum" Artis
- Donnell Rawlings as Damien "Day-Day" Price
- Jimmy Jelani Manners as Kevin Johnston
- Lizan Mitchell as Shooting Witness
- Robin Skye as Madame LaRue
- Fredro Starr as Marquis "Bird" Hilton

=== First appearances ===
This episode marks the first appearance of Clay Davis (Isiah Whitlock Jr.) and his aide Damien Price. Davis had a brief appearance in a scene depicting a party; he would become a more relevant character in later episodes. This is also the first appearance of Walon, Bubbles's sponsor and friend.

== Broadcast ==
This episode premiered July 21, 2002, on HBO in the U.S. In the UK, this episode had its broadcast TV debut on April 7, 2009, on BBC Two.

== Reception ==
This episode had nearly 4.12 million viewers and ranked fifth in the Nielsen Media Research U.S. premium cable ratings for the week ending July 21, 2002.

In a 2008 retrospective review for The Star-Ledger, Alan Sepinwall cited this episode as an example of "people in long-standing institutions who try to think outside the box, and who get mocked or outright attacked for doing so." For The Guardian in 2009, Saptarshi Ray praised the story pacing: "For a slow-burning drama, this episode packs plenty of action." Ray also praised the scene of Bubbles and Johnny at the Narcotics Anonymous meeting as "the most powerful scene" for depicting the "naked destruction" that drug addiction causes.
