= Undertow (The Wire) =

- The Wire episode
- Episode no.: Season 2 Episode 5
- Directed by: Steve Shill
- Story by: David Simon; Ed Burns
- Teleplay by: Ed Burns
- Original air date: June 29, 2003
- Running time: 57 minutes

Episode chronology
| ← Previous "Hard Cases" | Next → "All Prologue" |
- The Wire season 2

"Undertow" is the fifth episode of the second season of the HBO original series The Wire. The episode was written by Ed Burns from a story by David Simon & Ed Burns and was directed by Steve Shill. It originally aired on June 29, 2003.

== Plot ==
Rawls puts Freamon on the Sobotka detail and recommends that Bunk bring in a fresh detective as a partner on the case. Bunk, Beadie and Cole serve grand jury summons on checkers in Frank's stevedores union, including Johnny Fifty and Horseface, as part of the investigation into the Jane Does. Frank is enraged that the detectives believe he knew anything about the dead girls. Bunk learns that the hearings brought little information and that Beadie has no informants at the port. Later, Beadie visits Maui, an old flame, and sounds him out about becoming an informant. He refuses to give her information on his fellow union men but offers a tip: the union computers may be useful in tracking containers.

Bubbles visits the marine unit and informs McNulty that he has tracked down Omar. McNulty brings Omar in to be interviewed by Ilene Nathan in preparation for Bird's trial. Nathan is surprised at Omar's candor and history but considers him a sociopath and worries about putting him on the stand in front of Levy. She gives McNulty a voucher to buy Omar some more appropriate clothes for his court appearance. Later, McNulty asks Special Agent Cleary, his contact in the INS, if he can interview any vice suspects about his floater. Cleary finds some girls being held in New Jersey but finds it hard to understand McNulty's desire to identify the girl. After traveling to New Jersey, McNulty questions them but gets no response since he can't promise to keep them from being deported.

Daniels offers Carver a position in the Sobotka detail, reasoning that Carver is unlikely to betray the team again after previously being caught. However, Daniels tells Carver that he will not be recognized as a sergeant and will report to Greggs. Herc is overjoyed to be working with Carver again. Daniels orders DNRs and finance investigations to be done quickly to placate Valchek, and has Greggs, Herc and Carver look into the drug trade around the port. Freamon arrives and surprises the detail by recognizing Frank from a photo, noting his link to the Jane Does. As they set up their operation, the detectives find that the dealers in the port area are much less organized than the Barksdales. Meanwhile, Valchek receives another photo of his missing surveillance van, this time from San Diego, and is able to pull a fingerprint.

Donette visits D'Angelo, telling him that Stringer has been supporting her and will do the same for D'Angelo when he is released. D'Angelo is cynical about Stringer's motivations. In the Pit, Poot Carr tries to restrain his dealers when an addict disparages the product sold to him. Bodie says that someone needs to tell Stringer about the product's low quality. Stringer attends his economics class at the Baltimore City Community College and asks his teacher, Mr. Lucas, about selling an "inferior product" in a competitive marketplace. Lucas advises decreasing his prices to increase market share but warns that the product will lose credibility if the price is continually low. He also gives Stringer an example of a company CEO facing that exact problem, the solution being a change of name. After visiting Avon in prison, Stringer hosts a meeting with Barksdale dealers to solicit ideas for solving the organization's problems.

Ziggy arrives to collect money from a drug dealer named Frog, who comes short and claims his stash was stolen. Ziggy threatens him, but Frog remains indifferent. As Ziggy drives away, he is blocked by Proposition Joe's nephew, Melvin "Cheese" Wagstaff, and is confronted over a debt. Cheese and his men then shake down Ziggy and become frustrated when they find very little money on him. Ziggy offers his leather jacket as partial payment, but Cheese rejects the offer and threatens to kill him if the debt is not paid by Friday. Cheese and his men then proceed to take Ziggy's car. Meanwhile, Nick views a house with Aimee; the realtor is McNulty's ex-wife Elena. Nick initially refuses to help Ziggy deal with Cheese until he realizes his cousin is in danger. However, he is still unable to help Ziggy since he has already given his share of their take to Aimee for a rented apartment.

Nick asks Vondas and Sergei to put their smuggling on hold while Frank deals with the Jane Doe investigation. Vondas asks Nick about smuggling chemicals but is evasive when Nick asks what they will be used for. Nick and La La negotiate with Cheese, asking for the return of Ziggy's car so it can be sold to raise money. Cheese offers another week but shows Nick that his crew has already torched Ziggy's car. The Greek tells Vondas that he won't meet with Frank but will double his payment. Frank is dismissive of the offer but is forced to ponder the fate of his union if he cuts ties with The Greek. At the library, Nick and Ziggy learn that the chemicals that Vondas asked for are used for processing cocaine. Nick tells Vondas and Sergei that he is happy to deal as long as the chemicals are only used for narcotics. They tell Nick that they will triple their payment if Frank agrees to continue working with them, but Frank is defiant when confronted with the offer.

== Production ==
=== Title ===
Judith Soal of The Guardian found the title "Undertow" to serve as symbolism of Frank Sobotka unable to escape a need to profit by illegal means, like "currents that trap swimmers".

=== Epigraph ===
They used to make steel there, no?

— Spiros Vondas

Vondas makes this comment as a veiled criticism of Frank's caution in pursuing further deals with The Greeks' organization when faced with a police investigation. The season's theme of industrial decay is also thereby continued.

=== Credits ===
==== Starring cast ====
Although credited, Deirdre Lovejoy does not appear in this episode.

==== Guest stars ====
1. Seth Gilliam as Detective Ellis Carver
2. Domenick Lombardozzi as Detective Thomas "Herc" Hauk
3. Jim True-Frost as Detective Roland "Prez" Pryzbylewski
4. James Ransone as Ziggy Sobotka
5. Pablo Schreiber as Nick Sobotka
6. Callie Thorne as Elena McNulty
7. J.D. Williams as Preston "Boadie" Broadus
8. Michael K. Williams as Omar Little
9. Al Brown as Major Stan Valchek
10. Richard Burton as Sean "Shamrock" McGinty
11. Kristin Proctor as Aimee
12. Bill Raymond as The Greek
13. Shamyl Brown as Donette
14. Tray Chaney as Malik "Poot" Carr
15. Luray Cooper as Nat Coxson
16. Lance Irwin as Maui
17. Susan Rome as ASA Ilene Nathan
18. Chris Ashworth as Sergei Malatov
19. Jeffrey Fugitt as Officer Claude Diggins
20. Method Man as Melvin "Cheese" Wagstaff
21. Charley Scalies as Thomas "Horseface" Pakusa
22. Gary "D. Reign" Senkus as Frog

==== Uncredited appearances ====
- Gary D'Addario as Grand Jury Prosecutor Gary DiPasquale
- Jeffrey Pratt Gordon as Johnny "Fifty" Spamanto
- Kelvin Davis as La La
- De'Rodd Hearns as Puddin
- Robert F. Colesberry as Ray Cole
- Kevin Murray as Special Agent Cleary
- Unknown as Detective Massy
- Daniel Ross as Drug Dealer
- Lev Gorn as Eton Ben-Eleazer
- Mark Kochanowicz as Yuppie Husband

=== First appearances ===
- Frog: An East side drug dealer who sometimes works for Ziggy Sobotka
- Cheese Wagstaff ^{*}: Nephew of Eastside drug kingpin Proposition Joe and a feared lieutenant in his operation.

== Reception ==
On its debut, "Undertow" had nearly 3.62 million viewers and a 2.5 share, the second most watched premium cable series in the Nielsen ratings for the week ending June 29.

Alan Sepinwall observed themes in this episode of "characters underestimating their opponents" in Ziggy attempting to sell drugs and "big business meets dope business" in Stringer taking a college macroeconomics course.

Dauntless Media graded the episode with a B+ for "a great many story and character elements under the umbrella of a very important and profound theme", namely "how necessity and greed drive people into darker and darker avenues for themselves."

== Notes ==
- Cheese's given name was originally listed on the HBO website as "Calvin" before being changed to "Melvin".
