= The Buys =

- The Wire episode
- Episode no.: Season 1 Episode 3
- Directed by: Peter Medak
- Story by: David Simon; Ed Burns
- Teleplay by: David Simon
- Original air date: June 16, 2002
- Running time: 55 minutes

Episode chronology
← Previous "The Detail"	Next → "Old Cases"
- The Wire season 1

"The Buys" is the third episode of the first season of the American crime drama The Wire. The episode was written by David Simon from a story by David Simon and Ed Burns and was directed by Peter Medak. It premiered on June 16, 2002, on HBO in the U.S. The story focuses on the Baltimore police attempting an undercover drug purchase from the Barksdale gang while dealing with internal conflicts about investigative process.

This episode also marked the debut of Michael K. Williams in the series as Omar Little. One scene involving a chess game has been noted by critics as a memorable, symbolic moment in The Wire.

== Plot summary ==
Daniels attends a meeting in Burrell's office to account for the actions of his men at the projects. When he suggests that Prez be restricted to office work, Major Stanislaus Valchek, Prez's father-in-law, insists this would be an admission of guilt. Afterward, Burrell again insists on a simple investigation focused on arrests and seizures rather than securing convictions against the Barksdale Organization. McNulty is frustrated that the detail has no photo of Avon. However, Freamon takes an interest when Greggs mentions Avon's former career in boxing. The next day, he returns with a promotional poster bearing a picture of a young Avon.

Daniels informs the detail that Prez is off the street and Herc will be placed on sick leave. McNulty and Greggs visit Fitz, looking to get some equipment to wire up Sydnor as he is sent undercover. When McNulty tells Fitz that Daniels is the commanding officer, Fitz appears to bite his tongue because Greggs is present. Meanwhile, Santangelo is revealed to be a mole in the detail, tasked with finding incriminating information on McNulty for Rawls. Sydnor is given advice from Bubbles on how to be more convincing as a street buyer. Together, Sydnor and Bubbles visit the Pit. Sydnor notices with chagrin that neither drugs nor cash passes through the hands of any key players.

Daniels informs the detail that his superiors have insisted on a fast "buy-bust"-style investigation. McNulty is angry that the case is being pushed in the opposite direction he had hoped for. He arrives at Pearlman's home that night and asks how to clone a beeper. She suggests that he needs probable cause and to demonstrate exhaustion of other investigative techniques in order to get a signed affidavit from a judge. They end up in bed together. The following day, Daniels readies the detail to storm the projects in an effort to find a stash. When McNulty refuses to participate, believing the raid will sabotage their case, Daniels is enraged at his perceived insubordination. McNulty meets again with Fitz, who reveals that the FBI investigated Daniels after discovering he had hundreds of thousands of dollars in unexplained liquid assets.

Omar Little and his gang spend several days in a white van watching the Pit crew sell drugs. D'Angelo instructs Bodie, Poot and Wallace in showing respect to their customers and shares his belief that if there were no violence involved in their trade, the police would not be interested in them. While waiting for more product to be delivered, D'Angelo spots his crew playing checkers with a chess set. He teaches them the game of chess using the Barksdales as an analogy. At Orlando's strip club, Stringer is impressed by D'Angelo's earnings in the Pit and points out that if the Barksdales sell a low-quality product, addicts will buy more of it and the Barksdales end up with more money. On his way out, D'Angelo strikes up a conversation with Shardene. She does not remember him but is open to his advances.

Back in the Pit, D'Angelo leaves to buy food just before Omar's crew steals their drugs. When one of the low-rise dealers, Sterling, refuses to reveal the location of the stash and insists that nothing is there, Omar shoots him in the knee. This prompts a younger dealer to reveal that the stash is hidden in the kitchen. Bubbles witnesses the robbery and reports back to Greggs. The next day, Wee-Bey berates D'Angelo for being absent during the theft but learns Omar's name from Bodie. Before they can discuss this further, the police raid the Pit. The detail finds little evidence, though Freamon notices a number written on a wall and writes it down. While searching the crew, Mahon is punched by Bodie. Carver, Greggs and several officers respond with a beating. Carver reports that a camera crew has offered to show their seizures. Daniels is disgusted when Greggs points out they have nothing to show.

== Production ==
=== Epigraph ===
The King stay the King.

— D'Angelo

D'Angelo uses this phrase when describing the rules of chess using the analogy of the drug trade. He explains to Bodie that pawns can only become queens, never kings.

=== Credits ===
==== Starring cast ====
Although credited, Wood Harris does not appear in this episode. This is the first episode of the series not to feature the entire starring cast.

==== Guest stars ====
- Michael K. Williams as Omar Little
- J. D. Williams as Preston "Bodie" Broadus
- Seth Gilliam as Detective Ellis Carver
- Domenick Lombardozzi as Detective Thomas "Herc" Hauk
- Clarke Peters as Detective Lester Freamon
- Jim True-Frost as Detective Roland "Prez" Pryzbylewski
- Hassan Johnson as Roland "Wee-Bey" Brice
- Michael B. Jordan as Wallace
- Corey Parker Robinson as Detective Leander Sydnor
- Richard De Angelis as Major Raymond Foerster
- Delaney Williams as Sergeant Jay Landsman
- Michael Salconi as Detective Michael Santangelo
- Nat Benchley as Detective Augustus Polk
- Tom Quinn as Detective Patrick Mahon
- Wendy Grantham as Shardene Innes
- Al Brown as Major Stanislaus Valchek
- Tony D. Head as Major Bobby Reed
- Brandon Price as Anton "Stinkum" Artis
- Tray Chaney as Malik "Poot" Carr
- Doug Olear as FBI Agent Terrance Fitzhugh
- Michael Kevin Darnall as Brandon Wright
- Lance Williams as John Bailey
- Bill Zorzi as Bill Zorzi

=== First appearances ===
This episode introduces the recurring character Omar Little, a stick-up artist who robs drug dealers for a living. Little is played by Michael K. Williams. The character became a major part of the show, frequently cited by critics and fans as one of the favorites. With the third season, Michael K. Williams joined the starring cast. His character is accompanied by his partners in crime Brandon Wright and John Bailey.

The episode also marks the first appearance of recurring Baltimore police department officers Major Bobby Reed, commander of the internal investigations division (IID), and Major Stanislaus Valchek, Southeastern district commander and Prez's father-in-law. Valchek plays a major role in the second season and appears in all five seasons of the show.

== Broadcast ==
"The Buys" premiered June 16, 2002, on HBO in the U.S. In the UK, this episode had its broadcast TV debut on April 1, 2009, on BBC Two.

== Reception ==
A San Francisco Chronicle review in 2002 picked the scene of D'Angelo instructing his subordinates in the rules of chess as one of the first season's finest moments. They praised the character of D'Angelo and the show's portrayal of his difficulties as "middle management" in the drug organization having to deal with unreliable subordinates, demanding superiors and his own conscience. Similarly, Alan Sepinwall commented in a 2008 review for The Star-Ledger: "Not only does the chess/drug metaphor work, but it shows how well D'Angelo understands the rigged, unchangeable nature of The Game, and how deep this series intends to go."

In a 2009 retrospective for The Guardian, about The Wire season one, Saptarshi Ray praised D'Angelo's speech at the chess game and the police's botched raid as two "iconic scenes" in the series.
