= Back Burners =

- The Wire episode
- Episode no.: Season 3 Episode 7
- Directed by: Tim Van Patten
- Story by: David Simon; Joy Lusco
- Teleplay by: Joy Lusco
- Original air date: November 7, 2004
- Running time: 55 minutes

Episode chronology
← Previous "Homecoming"	Next → "Moral Midgetry"
- The Wire season 3

"Back Burners" is the 32nd episode of the American crime drama The Wire, also the seventh episode of the show's third seasons. The episode was written by Joy Lusco from a story by David Simon & Joy Lusco and was directed by Tim Van Patten. It premiered November 7, 2004, on HBO in the U.S. In the episode, a designated drug dealing zone descends into chaos and violence, Omar Little hesitates in purchasing the service weapon stolen from Baltimore police officer Dozerman, and the Baltimore police attempts to unmask burner phones used by Marlo's crew and the Barksdale Organization.

Critics for The Guardian and HitFix analyzed the episode for its message about drug decriminalization.

== Plot ==
Omar visits Butchie to discuss Bunk's lecture about the loss of morality in their neighborhood. Butchie dismisses it as a ploy by Bunk, but Omar cannot put his conscience to rest. He locates Dozerman's weapon, which Butchie hands to Bunk. Elsewhere, Carcetti questions Burrell and verifies that Mayor Royce has not acted on his request to look into the death of the state's witness. D'Agostino convinces Carcetti to meet with Royce again, and hold off on attacking him until a time closer to the mayoral primaries. Carcetti approaches Royce a second time to discuss changes to the way the city protects witnesses, but the mayor claims there is no money available. Carcetti types a letter of concern while Royce and Burrell hold a press conference on the return of Dozerman's weapon.

In the Western, Slim Charles tells Avon that Marlo has withdrawn his operation from all of his corners; Avon orders him to take the corners as soon as the police watching them leave. Colvin discusses his statistics with Lieutenant Mello and the Western's community relations sergeant, which show that crime is up near designated drug dealing zone Hamsterdam but down in the rest of the district. Mello thinks the bosses should know that what they are doing is working, but Colvin insists that it should be kept a secret for the time being, to make sure the numbers are sustainable. In Hamsterdam, Bubbles feels uncomfortable amidst chaos, including a fight on the street.

Herc and Colicchio refuse to help Sergeant Carver as he assists in the Hamsterdam experiment. When Carver remarks that there are too many children, Colicchio notes that many of them are now unemployed because lookouts and runners are not needed if trade is allowed. Carver tells the dealers that they have to pay one hundred dollars a week to deal in Hamsterdam, with the money going towards supporting the children. Carver uses the first of the cash to buy a basketball hoop for the children, only for the hoop to be damaged at night. Meanwhile, Marlo tells Partlow they are going to step back and wholesale their package to other dealers and let Avon take their corners.

Bernard purchases batches of disposable phones for Shamrock, sticking to Bell's rules by buying only two phones from any single outlet. Elsewhere, Donette tells Bell that Brianna is planning to visit the police station to talk to McNulty about D'Angelo's death. An angered Bell learns that Brianna has been in contact with Levy, who recommends that they tell Avon. Bell says he will handle it. Meanwhile, Slim Charles assigns Poot to one of Marlo's corners with some muscle for protection. Poot is worried about retaliation from Marlo. Later, Snoop kills one of Poot's men in a drive-by shooting.

At the Major Crimes Unit, Daniels reports that Bell and Marlo are the unit's new targets. He calls McNulty into his office, accurately suspecting he used Colvin to force the unit's change in direction. An unapologetic McNulty defends his actions, upon which Daniels tells him that he will be out of the unit once Bell is arrested. Freamon and Prez analyze the phone that Bubbles procured, but the information is difficult to interpret without knowing more about Marlo's organization. Freamon comments that a phone from the Barksdale organization would allow them to map out the organization but it would be difficult to get a wiretap up with the phones being disposed of so quickly.

McNulty, Greggs, and Sydnor restart their surveillance work, waiting for Bodie to dump a phone. McNulty convinces them to share a drink with him, causing them to narrowly miss Avon's meeting with Bodie. Greggs comes home drunk and argues with Cheryl, who asks her to leave. The next morning, Shamrock phones Bodie and Puddin and recommends that they relocate to Hamsterdam. On their way to the zone, their SUV is stopped by McNulty and Greggs. McNulty covertly swaps out Bodie's phone for a similar model, while Bodie and the dealers angrily mention Hamsterdam several times. After being called to assist McNulty and Greggs, Carver is forced to tell them what Hamsterdam is. Colvin arrives to explain his plan to the unit, asking them to keep it secret.

Back at the detail, Prez reports the information he found on D'Agostino to McNulty. Using the information, McNulty dons a suit and attends a Washington fundraiser, where he runs into her and arranges another one night stand. The following day, McNulty arrives late and finds Pearlman and Daniels receiving a briefing from Freamon and Prez, who have identified a communication network with fifteen distinct phone users by analyzing call patterns. They have identified a coordinator who acts as a nexus for communications. The detectives have also found that the phones are pre-programmed with the numbers before being put into use. Freamon asks Greggs to have the Western DEU squad collect phones for them.

Greggs and McNulty meet with Herc and Carver and ask them to collect any stray burners they find. Herc tells them that he saw Avon driving around the neighborhood, which McNulty and Greggs both refuse to believe. Upon returning to the office, they check Avon's status on the computer and, along with Daniels, are outraged when they find he has been paroled. Meanwhile, having left the game for good, Cutty reapplies himself to the casual landscaping job he was working before and tells the Deacon that he no longer desires gang life and prefers to go by Dennis.

== Production ==
=== Epigraph ===
Conscience do cost.

— Butchie

=== Credits ===
A dedication ran at the beginning of the closing credits:

"In memory of Geraldine Peroni; editor, colleague, friend. 1953-2004"

==== Guest stars ====
1. Glynn Turman as Mayor Clarence Royce
2. Chad L. Coleman as Dennis "Cutty" Wise
3. Jamie Hector as Marlo Stanfield
4. Brandy Burre as Theresa D'Agostino
5. Melanie Nicholls King as Cheryl
6. Delaney Williams as Sergeant Jay Landsman
7. Leo Fitzpatrick as Johnny
8. S. Robert Morgan as Butchie
9. Melvin Williams as The Deacon
10. Megan Anderson as Jen Carcetti
11. Shamyl Brown as Donette
12. Jay Landsman as Lieutenant Dennis Mello
13. Richard Burton as Sean "Shamrock" McGinty
14. Tray Chaney as Malik "Poot" Carr
15. Anwan Glover as Slim Charles
16. Benjamin Busch as Officer Anthony Colicchio
17. Mia Arnice Chambers as Squeak
18. Melvin Jackson Jr. as Bernard
19. Ryan Sands as Officer Lloyd "Truck" Garrick
20. De'Rodd Hearns as Puddin
21. Michael Kostroff as Maurice Levy
22. Felicia Pearson as Snoop
23. Rico Whelchel as Rico
24. Gbenga Akinnagbe as Chris Partlow
25. R. Emery Bright as Community Relations Sergeant
26. Eugene Little as landscaping crew chief
27. Cleo Reginald Pizana as Coleman Parker

==== Uncredited appearances ====
- Rick Otto as Officer Kenneth Dozerman
- Joilet F. Harris as Officer Caroline Massey
- Richard DeAngelis as Colonel Raymond Foerster
- Gregory L. Williams as Detective Crutchfield
- Robert X. Golphin as Crackhead

=== First appearances ===
- Bernard: Barksdale organization member responsible for purchasing the disposable cell phones they use.
- Squeak: Bernard's nagging girlfriend.
- Detective Michael Crutchfield: Homicide Detective in Sergeant Landsman's unit who gets his tie cut, having fallen asleep after working a double shift.

== Reception ==
For HitFix, Alan Sepinwall cited the Hamsterdam plot as an example of how "people who think outside the box don't always think everything through". Steve Busfield of The Guardian found a similarity between Hamsterdam and real-life Baltimore mayor Kurt Schmoke advocating for drug decriminalization.
