= Moral Midgetry =

- The Wire episode
- Episode no.: Season 3 Episode 8
- Directed by: Agnieszka Holland
- Story by: David Simon; Richard Price
- Teleplay by: Richard Price
- Original air date: November 14, 2004
- Running time: 58 minutes

Episode chronology
← Previous "Back Burners"	Next → "Slapstick"
- The Wire season 3

"Moral Midgetry" is the 33rd episode of the American crime drama The Wire, also the eighth episode of the show's third season. The episode was written by Richard Price from a story by David Simon & Richard Price and was directed by Agnieszka Holland. It premiered on November 14, 2004, on HBO in the U.S. In the episode, the Baltimore police face questions from a church deacon and an ambitious politician about lawlessness and violence emerging in the police's designated drug dealing zone, Stringer Bell struggles to advance in his real estate development goals, and relatives learn the true cause of D'Angelo Barksdale's death in prison.

Nearly 1.5 million viewers watched "Moral Midgetry" on its debut. The Futon Critic named it one of the best TV episodes of 2004, and The Guardian and HitFix praised the storytelling and character development surrounding the revelations about D'Angelo Barksdale.

== Plot ==
=== The police ===
During a subcommittee hearing, Carcetti expresses concern that the impressive reduction in crime from the Western may be a misrepresentation. He further lays into Burrell about the ongoing problems in the city's witness protection program, ignoring advice from both Gray and D'Agostino. At a dinner with Carcetti and his wife, D'Agostino chastises Carcetti for his short-sightedness in using facts to win arguments instead of an inspiring message, and arranges for Carcetti to get coaching to improve his demeanor.

In Hamsterdam, drug dealers are lured into an abandoned house to buy jewelry, only to be robbed and tied up by a stick-up crew. After being freed, the dealers plead with Baltimore police officers Carver, Herc and Colicchio for better security. Elsewhere, Major Colvin takes his friend the Deacon on a tour of the improved neighborhood, then brings him into Hamsterdam. Colvin suggests to Carver that he pay the young lookouts to act as auxiliary police and watch for trouble. The Deacon, disgusted by Hamsterdam, asks Colvin to provide clean water and health care now that the addicts have been concentrated into one place.

Cutty helps the Deacon load boxes into a car, saying he needs to occupy himself to stay straight. A community leader named Roman meets with both men and suggests an abandoned gym that the kids can use for boxing training. When Roman presents Cutty with a disused gym, Cutty resolves to fix it up himself, pleased to have something to work on. Colvin leaves a meeting with the Deacon to attend a ComStat briefing, where Rawls insinuates Colvin is altering his reports to get his significantly lowered crime figures and asks Colvin to give him his records for review. After Colvin, Roman, and the Deacon meet with a representative of a public health non-profit, the major institutes initiatives to exchange needles and provide free condoms in Hamsterdam.

Using its serial number, Prez traces Bodie's disposable phone to the store where it was sold. Freamon maps out store locations and finds that they are spread along I-95 between Baltimore and Richmond. He assigns McNulty and Greggs to track the buyer of the phones. Upon visiting the store, the detectives find that the chain’s policy is that security tapes are reused after a week, so there is no chance of getting footage of the buyer. Greggs decides they should drive further out to independent stores. In Dumfries, Virginia, McNulty and Greggs find a mini-mart where Bernard bought eight phones, only to be told they also reuse their security tapes. Realizing the local police could help them, McNulty approaches a local officer and feigns racism under the assumption that the white officer will be more inclined to help him. However, McNulty learns that another officer, who is also his wife, is black. The white officer cooperates anyway and promises to provide outdoor security footage of the mini-mart. McNulty and Greggs find a motel and discuss infidelity.

Upon returning to the detail, the detectives find Agent Terrence "Fitz" Fitzhugh installing new equipment, which allows Prez to enlarge the mini-mart footage and get Bernard's plate number. Greggs and Prez track the plate number to a rental agency and find that Bernard rents a car from them every couple of weeks to make his collections. McNulty meets with Brianna and insists that D'Angelo could not have killed himself, and that he was most likely the victim of a planned murder. McNulty guilt trips Brianna concerning her role in the Barksdales and D'Angelo's turn to crime, leaving her crying uncontrollably.

=== Barksdale Organization ===
At Rico's funeral, Avon and Slim Charles plot revenge on Marlo. Meanwhile, Bell meets with Senator Davis to question him about the lack of progress in his development business. Back in the office, Avon gives Charles a contact in social services to find some of Omar's relatives. Charles suggests that splitting their efforts between Omar and Marlo may be a mistake, but Avon reassures him that he can handle everything. Shamrock bribes a social services employee and learns the address for Omar's grandmother. Charles has Sapper and Gerard to stake out the house and tells them to wait for Omar to show up. Sapper once more fails to understand the plan. Krawczyk tells Bell about a rival property developer who has garnered much success associating with Davis. When Bell comes back to insist that Davis move faster in making him money, the senator takes him to meet a contact who can arrange federal funding. Bell gives Davis a briefcase full of cash and asks if he is sure the contact can be trusted; Davis calls this a sign that Stringer is still not ready, but takes the money and tells Stringer that everything is a go. Brianna visits the funeral home looking for Avon; Bell tries to dissuade her from talking to him and promises to put them in touch.

=== Stanfield Organization ===
Marlo catches a girl watching him in a club and approaches her. Marlo checks that she is there with friends and declines both drinking and dancing. Instead they leave the club together. After they have sex in his car she persuades him to meet her again the following day. She tells him her name is Devonne.

Marlo phones Devonne to arrange a meeting, but feels suspicious. He assigns Chris Partlow to check out the meeting place to see if it is a setup. Snoop sits in the restaurant where Marlo had arranged to meet Devonne and recognizes Perry, a Barksdale soldier, buying a large quantity of food and taking it to a nearby SUV. Snoop reports in to Partlow. Partlow observes Devonne receiving a signal from the car. In response, he has his driver pull up alongside the SUV, at which point Partlow fires a shotgun through the side window, wounding Avon in the shoulder and killing Tater.

Shamrock reports the shooting to Stringer and tells him that Brianna has been calling looking for Avon. Stringer orders Shamrock to keep Brianna away from him and Avon. Avon meets with Shamrock, Slim Charles and Perry and tells them they are going to wait out Marlo, forcing him to return to the corners to make money. Stringer interrupts the meeting. He warns Avon about the consequences of war. Avon criticizes Stringer as being too concerned with money and having lost his hard edge for the street and warns he may not be smart enough for the business world. Stringer says that thinking before killing does not make him soft, but Avon challenges Stringer's toughness by asking him who he has killed. Stringer reports Brianna's meeting with McNulty and reveals to Avon that he was behind D'Angelo's death, and that his was a life that had to be taken. Avon attacks Stringer, but Stringer overpowers his wounded friend and tells him that he did it for him, to protect him from D'Angelo turning against him. Stringer lets Avon up from the ground, and Avon walks away and sits down, speechless.

== Production ==
=== Epigraph ===
Crawl, walk, and then run.

— Clay Davis

=== Writing ===
In a 2009 interview with The Wall Street Journal, producer George Pelecanos said that he sought to have Cutty serve as "a moral center" among characters and recalled constructive debates with creator David Simon about developing the Cutty character.

=== Credits ===
==== Starring cast ====
Although credited, Deirdre Lovejoy, Wendell Pierce, J. D. Williams, and Corey Parker Robinson do not appear in this episode.

==== Guest stars ====
1. Isiah Whitlock, Jr. as Clay Davis
2. Chad L. Coleman as Dennis "Cutty" Wise
3. Jamie Hector as Marlo Stanfield
4. Brandy Burre as Theresa D'Agostino
5. Michael Hyatt as Brianna Barksdale
6. Melvin Williams as The Deacon
7. Megan Anderson as Jen Carcetti
8. Clarence Clemons as Roman
9. Doug Olear as Special Agent Terrence "Fitz" Fitzhugh
10. Gbenga Akkinagbe as Chris Partlow
11. Benjamin Busch as Officer Anthony Colicchio
12. Ryan Sands as Officer Lloyd "Truck" Garrick
13. Michael Willis as Andy Krawczyk
14. Richard Burton as Sean "Shamrock" McGinty
15. Anwan Glover as Slim Charles
16. Jonathan Orcutt as Sheriff
17. William Zielinski as Gene - public health academic
18. Mayo Best as Gerard
19. Kelli R. Brown as Kimmy
20. Christopher Mann as Tony Gray
21. Brandan T. Tate as Sapper
22. Ernest Waddell as Dante
23. Perry Blackmon as Perry
24. Fran Boyd as Needle Exchange Worker
25. Tiana Harris as Devonne
26. Genevieve Hudson-Price as Dee-Dee
27. Felicia Pearson as Snoop

The female needle exchange worker is played by Fran Boyd, who was one of the main subjects of David Simon and Ed Burns' previous HBO miniseries The Corner.

==== Uncredited appearances ====
- Lee E. Cox as Officer Aaron Castor
- Rico Whelchel as Rico
- Delaney Williams as Sergeant Jay Landsman (voice only)
- Nehal Joshi as Baba Jani manager
- Edward Green as Spider
- Anthony Fedd as Tucky
- Unknown as Tater
- Unknown as Veterinary Surgeon
- [Anya Randall Nebel] as Deputy Carol Ann
- Daryl Davis as Mondo Mart Manager

== Reception ==
On its debut, "Moral Midgetry" had an estimated 1.47 million viewers, ranking third in Nielsen Media Research's U.S. premium cable ratings for the week ending November 14, 2004.

The Futon Critic named it the 15th best episode of 2004, saying "It was the showdown we all knew had to happen as Stringer surprisingly confesses to Avon his ordering the death of his nephew after being chided over his lack of toughness. What follows is absolutely jaw dropping and riveting, as Idris Elba and Wood Harris prove themselves to be some of TV's most talented actors."

For HitFix, Alan Sepinwall commented on the scene of McNulty confronting Brianna Barksdale regarding D'Angelo's death: "Brianna manipulating her son into backing out of his plea deal is one of the coldest, cruelest deeds perpetrated by any 'Wire' character, and yet it's so rare on this show to see the bad guys held emotionally accountable for their deeds." Saptarshi Ray found a rare moment of conscience for McNulty, writing in The Guardian: "McNulty may be an unreconstructed wanker when it comes to shafting many of his colleagues. He may have an unreasonable view of Stringer's danger to society compared to his desire to get his man. But in this case he is the voice of morality."
