= Old Cases =

- The Wire episode
- Episode no.: Season 1 Episode 4
- Directed by: Clement Virgo
- Story by: David Simon; Ed Burns
- Teleplay by: David Simon
- Original air date: June 23, 2002
- Running time: 60 minutes

Episode chronology
← Previous "The Buys"	Next → "The Pager"
- The Wire season 1

"Old Cases" is the fourth episode of the first season of the American crime drama The Wire. The episode was written by David Simon from a story by David Simon and Ed Burns and was directed by Clement Virgo. It originally aired on June 23, 2002, on HBO in the U.S. The story focuses on the Baltimore police struggling to persuade witnesses to divulge details of the Barksdale gang's drug dealing.

Nearly three million viewers watched the episode on its premiere. Critics praised the episode for the character development of Jimmy McNulty, along with a scene with minimalist dialogue between McNulty and Bunk Moreland.

== Plot summary ==
McNulty and Greggs attend a court hearing for Marvin Browning, a Barksdale dealer arrested for a hand-to-hand deal. Hoping he will give them information, they push Assistant State's Attorney Dawkins to pursue a maximum sentence, even though Browning had only been caught selling small amounts of heroin and cocaine. Browning nonetheless refuses their offer of a deal. Meanwhile, Mahon gets an early retirement and an increase in his pension due to his injury. Herc and Carver drive to a juvenile detention center in Prince George's County, only to find that Bodie has escaped from the low-security facility. They raid Bodie's home but find only his grandmother. Embarrassed by the rude intrusion, Herc apologizes and leaves his card.

Bunk and McNulty review old homicide cases and try to match them to the Barksdale Organization. Landsman insists they review the case of Deirdre Kresson, a college girl murdered far from West Baltimore, with a "Dee" listed as a possible suspect. McNulty reluctantly agrees to investigate the seemingly unrelated murder since the homicide unit is currently understaffed. At the crime scene, the two communicate using only variations of the word "fuck" as they recreate the murder and find a shell casing and bullet that previous detectives missed. Landsman visits Rawls and, while noting McNulty's character flaws, asserts that those very qualities make him "good police." Relenting, Rawls offers a deal: if McNulty wraps up the detail in two weeks, he can return to normal duty.

Greggs and Bubbles discuss the recent hit on the Barksdale stash by Omar. McNulty is forced to drive Bubbles to his son's soccer game. During the trip, he discusses sharing parental custody with his estranged wife Elena, but the conversation devolves into profanity. At home, Greggs notices Cheryl's cell phone bill and realizes that the Barksdale dealers use pagers to avoid any documentation of incoming and outgoing calls. Judge Phelan is disappointed when Burrell tells him they have nothing on the Barksdales and phones McNulty. Daniels meets with Burrell and tells him that he can take the Barksdale case wherever the deputy commissioner wants, raising the possibility of McNulty's suggested wire to make the case.

Greggs suggests pager cloning to monitor Barksdale communications, but Daniels points out that they need to have a number to bug. Freamon surprises everybody by revealing that the number he found in the stash house belongs to D'Angelo. While sharing a drink with McNulty, Freamon explains that he was transferred to the pawn shop unit after pursuing a politically connected suspect against his major's orders. Freamon warns that McNulty is likely on a similar path. That night, McNulty shows up at Greggs' apartment drunk. She confirms that their visual surveillance was unable to follow targets into the towers as planned. Back with Cheryl, Greggs explains that McNulty is lonely, and they begin to make love.

Omar and his associates Brandon and Bailey enjoy the proceeds from the Barksdale robbery. Brandon apologizes for using Omar's name during the raid, but Omar points out that he was already well known anyway. He is worried that the Barksdales could attack Brandon, who is revealed to be Omar's lover. An addict approaches Omar with her infant son and respectfully asks for a free fix, which he gives her.

Meanwhile, Avon discusses the loss of the stash with his enforcers Anton "Stinkum" Artis and Wee-Bey Brice, putting a contract out on Omar's crew. Avon doubles the bounty when informed that Omar is gay. Stringer tells Avon he is worried about the Pit operation since the robbery coincided with the police raid. He reassures Avon that D'Angelo is doing well but is worried there may be a leak from someone in D'Angelo's crew. Bodie returns to the Pit, where Poot and Wallace are surprised that he has returned so soon after his arrest. D'Angelo bristles when Bodie says he would still be there had it been him, telling them that he murdered Kresson, Avon's scorned girlfriend, after she had threatened to testify to police. Bodie, who has never killed anybody, is humbled. The dealers destroy some new security cameras around the towers.

== Production ==
=== Epigraph ===
Thin line 'tween heaven and here.

— Bubbles

The line is said as Bubbles is being returned to the ghetto by McNulty after the two have spent an afternoon in suburbia, which Bubbles refers to as "Leave It to Beaver land."

=== Music ===
When Freamon and McNulty start talking in the bar, Miles Davis' "All Blues", from the album Kind of Blue plays diegetically in the background. When the head has finished and Davis begins his trumpet solo, Freamon opens up and tells McNulty what happened to his career.

=== Credits ===
==== Starring cast ====
Although credited, Deirdre Lovejoy does not appear in this episode.

==== Guest stars ====
- Peter Gerety as Judge Daniel Phelan
- Callie Thorne as Elena McNulty
- Michael K. Williams as Omar Little
- J. D. Williams as Preston "Bodie" Broadus
- Seth Gilliam as Detective Ellis Carver
- Domenick Lombardozzi as Detective Thomas "Herc" Hauk
- Clarke Peters as Detective Lester Freamon
- Jim True-Frost as Detective Roland "Prez" Pryzbylewski
- Hassan Johnson as Roland "Wee-Bey" Brice
- Michael B. Jordan as Wallace
- Corey Parker-Robinson as Detective Leander Sydnor
- Delaney Williams as Sergeant Jay Landsman
- Melanie Nicholls-King as Cheryl
- Michael Salconi as Detective Michael Santangelo
- Tray Chaney as Malik "Poot" Carr
- Brandon Price as Anton "Stinkum" Artis
- Nat Benchley as Detective Augustus Polk
- Tom Quinn as Detective Patrick Mahon
- Michael Kevin Darnall as Brandon Wright
- Caroline G. Pleasant as Bodie's grandmother
- Antonio Cordova as Michael McNulty
- Lance Williams as John Bailey
- Takara Collins as Deirdre Kresson

=== First appearances ===
This episode marks the first appearance of Jimmy McNulty's estranged family. Callie Thorne plays Elena McNulty, Jimmy's estranged wife and the mother of his two sons. Callie Thorne also appeared on Homicide: Life on the Street alongside several other Wire cast members. Antonio Cordova plays Michael McNulty, Jimmy's soccer-playing younger son. His older son, Sean, remains unseen in this episode.

== Broadcast ==
"Old Cases" premiered June 23, 2002, on HBO in the U.S. In the UK, this episode had its broadcast TV debut on April 2, 2009, on BBC Two in most regions.

== Reception ==
On its debut, the episode had an estimated 2.91 million viewers, ranking second in the Nielsen Media Research U.S. premium cable ratings for the week ending June 23, 2002.

Critics praised the scene in which Bunk and McNulty repeatedly say only variations of the word "fuck" while investigating the murder of Diedre Kresson. In 2012, Time Out New York called it "proof that you don't need many words to tell a story." Alan Sepinwall commented in a 2008 review for The Star-Ledger that the "fuck" scene was a "gorgeous, precise employment of nouns, verbs, adverbs and adjectives".

Sepinwall also noted the character development of McNulty in this episode: "...the bulk of 'Old Cases' is devoted to illustrating the ways in which his personality flaws -- his addiction to himself, as Sgt. Jay Landsman puts it -- constantly get in the way of people noticing just how good he is."
