= Game Day (The Wire) =

- The Wire episode
- Episode no.: Season 1 Episode 9
- Directed by: Milčo Mančevski
- Story by: David Simon; Ed Burns
- Teleplay by: David H. Melnick; Shamit Choksey
- Original air date: August 4, 2002
- Running time: 56 minutes

Episode chronology
← Previous "Lessons"	Next → "The Cost"

"Game Day" is the ninth episode of the first season of the HBO original series The Wire (2002–2008). The episode was written by David H. Melnick and Shamit Choksey from a story by David Simon and Ed Burns and was directed by Milčo Mančevski. It originally aired on August 4, 2002.

== Plot ==
Stringer and Avon visit a gym to arrange a junior college athlete to play for them at an upcoming Eastside/Westside basketball game. After their negotiations, they discuss the hunt for Omar. Stringer wants to feign passivity until Omar re-emerges, but Avon is adamant that they need to kill him to maintain their street cred. Meanwhile, Wallace tells D'Angelo that he does not want to work anymore because he is unsettled by the deaths of Brandon and Stinkum. D'Angelo gives him his blessing to return to school as well as some cash. Poot later goes looking for Wallace and finds him buying drugs.

Bubbles and Johnny spot Walon, the speaker from their Narcotics Anonymous meeting. They are distracted by Bodie, who is throwing out free vials of the Barksdales' new product. Bubbles approaches Walon afterward and learns that he has come to the towers to try to convince his nephew to go straight. Later, Bubbles steals a large stash and shoots up with Johnny, only to realize that it is mere baking soda. Bubbles is motivated to visit his sister and persuades her that he is serious about getting clean. She reluctantly gives him a key so that he can use her basement but forbids him from coming upstairs.

Omar continues stalking the towers looking for a way to get at Avon. He eventually approaches Proposition Joe, Avon's east side competitor, and offers some of his takings from the Barksdales' stash in exchange for Avon's pager number. Omar tracks Avon to Orlando's and tricks him into answering a page using Wee-Bey's code. Avon realizes that something is amiss when Wee-Bey pulls up, diving out of range just as Omar opens fire. In the ensuing gunfight, Wee-Bey wings Omar, who is forced to retreat.

The detail's surveillance work continues with Herc and Carver on the streets and Freamon, Sydnor and Prez at the office. They intercept a call and learn that Wee-Bey is about to move some money. Herc and Carver intercept Wee-Bey and take the money, telling him that he can get it from the State's Attorney if he can explain where it came from. They discuss keeping some, but Carver decides it would not be worth the risk with the wire running. The detectives deliver the money and listen in on a call that Poot makes to his girlfriend. After a substantial amount of phone sex, they hear something pertinent. McNulty and Prez both note that they cannot use the call as evidence without justifying it. Later, Daniels finds the money short. Thinking Herc and Carver stole it, he tells them that they have until roll call the following morning to bring it back. The two bicker, each suspecting the other, but when the cash turns up in their car, Carver apologizes to Herc.

Tension builds between McNulty and Daniels. When McNulty remarks that they need to extend the wiretap, Daniels responds angrily. Freamon defends Daniels, saying that he is in a difficult position between his men and his superiors. Freamon instructs Sydnor and Prez in tracking the money which the Barksdale crew is making. He gets records from City Hall showing massive campaign contributions from the Barksdales to various politicians. These efforts also reveal information on the Barksdales' front organizations, including Orlando's strip club, a funeral parlor and several warehouses. At the basketball game, Avon mocks Proposition Joe's attempt to dress like a real coach. Poot and Bodie explain the game to Herc and Carver: the loser has to throw a party for both crews. Carver and Herc try to identify Avon but have no idea whom they are looking for. Sydnor arrives and quickly recognizes Avon from his old boxing photo.

Freamon and Greggs pick up Shardene, the exotic dancer from Orlando's strip club. In an attempt to turn her, they take her to identify Keisha's corpse, which has been found wrapped in a rug and left in a dumpster. Appalled and distraught upon realizing D'Angelo was almost certainly involved in the disposal of the body, Shardene agrees to assist police and moves out of his apartment. When he asks her for a reason, she hints that she knows what really happened to Keisha.

== Production ==
=== Title reference ===
The title refers to the Eastside/Westside basketball game (pictured).

=== Epigraph ===
Maybe we won. - Herc

Herc says this to Carver when they cannot find anyone in the Baltimore ghettos (not yet realizing that most residents are attending the East Side vs. West Side basketball game), in reference to Carver's comment in "The Target" that the war on drugs will never end.

=== Credits ===
==== Starring cast ====
Although credited, John Doman, Frankie Faison, Deirdre Lovejoy, and Wendell Pierce do not appear in this episode.

==== Guest stars ====
- Seth Gilliam as Detective Ellis Carver
- Domenick Lombardozzi as Detective Thomas "Herc" Hauk
- Clarke Peters as Detective Lester Freamon
- Jim True-Frost as Detective Roland "Prez" Pryzbylewski
- Leo Fitzpatrick as Johnny Weeks
- J. D. Williams as Preston "Boadie" Broadus
- Hassan Johnson as Roland "Wee-Bey" Brice
- Corey Parker Robinson as Detective Leander Sydnor
- Steve Earle as Walon
- Michael B. Jordan as Wallace
- Michael K. Williams as Omar Little
- Tray Chaney as Malik "Poot" Carr
- Wendy Grantham as Shardene Innes
- Clayton LeBouef as Wendell "Orlando" Blocker
- Michael Salconi as Detective Michael Santangelo
- Robert F. Chew as Proposition Joe
- Chris Clanton as Savino

=== First appearances ===
Proposition Joe: Eastside Drug Kingpin and Avon's rival in the basketball game.

The articles of corporation for the front company B-Squared (viewed by Prez on microfilm) show that Maurice Levy's address is 450 North Lombard Street, Baltimore, Maryland. The articles give the purposes of the business as that of a funeral parlor.
