= All Due Respect (The Wire) =

2nd episode of the 3rd season of The Wire

- The Wire episode
- Episode no.: Season 3 Episode 2
- Directed by: Steve Shill
- Story by: David Simon; Richard Price
- Teleplay by: Richard Price
- Original air date: September 26, 2004
- Running time: 58 minutes

Episode chronology
← Previous "Time After Time"	Next → "Dead Soldiers"
- The Wire season 3

"All Due Respect" is the 27th episode of the American crime drama The Wire and the second episode of the show's third season. The episode was written by Richard Price from a story by David Simon & Richard Price and was directed by Steve Shill. The story focuses on the Baltimore Police pursuing the crew of Cheese Wagstaff and an escalating conflict between the Barksdale and Stanfield crime organizations. It originally aired on September 26, 2004, on HBO in the U.S. Critics with The Buffalo News and San Jose Mercury News praised Price's writing and storytelling.

== Plot ==
McNulty visits medical examiner Randall Frazier, skeptical that D'Angelo Barksdale's death in prison was a suicide. Frazier reports that D'Angelo's death could have been a homicide, citing bruises on his neck and back. McNulty visits D'Angelo's ex-girlfriend Donette, who doesn't tell him anything. Meanwhile, Cheese euthanizes his dog when it loses in a dogfight. Soon afterwards, Tree, a drug dealer attending the dogfight, approaches and kills another dealer named Jelly. The MCU hears chatter about the murder over the wire, assuming a gang war has erupted.

Daniels and the Major Case Unit want to make arrests for the murders, but McNulty argues that they should gather more evidence in the hope of ultimately bringing down Bell. The unit arrests Cheese's crew. Under questioning, Cheese admits to killing his dog—not a person as the detectives assumed—meaning he can't be charged. The following day, the MCU finds that their wiretaps have gone dead. While patrolling the Western, Herc and Carver pick up Poot.

Herc, Carver and Kenneth Dozerman go to the movies with their girlfriends, where they are mortified to bump into Poot, Bodie and Puddin with their dates. Later, Dozerman is shot and wounded while undercover, and his gun is stolen. The next day, Colvin tells his men that he is suspending all undercover narcotics work, likening the war on drugs to Prohibition. Back out on the street, Herc cannot understand Colvin's reasoning. Omar and his crew stick up Shamrock and Country while they collect money for a drug resupply.

Bell visits Avon in prison and reveals his plan to supply other dealers. Avon asks Bell to target specific high-turnover areas, but Bell expresses reluctance to use violence to maintain their street cred. Country, Shamrock and Bodie are sent to talk to mid-level dealers to try to displace their suppliers. Bodie is tasked with approaching Marlo, but is unable to find him; Marlo instructs his corner boss Fruit to ignore Bodie and go back to work. At the funeral home, Bell sends Bodie out to look for Marlo again and learns of Omar's robbery. Marlo meets with Vinson, who advises him to prepare for war if he doesn't compromise with the Barksdales.

== Production ==
=== Epigraph ===
There's never been a paper bag

— Colvin

=== Writing ===
Richard Price was among several crime writers recruited by Wire creator David Simon to write for season three; Simon cited Price's 1992 novel Clockers as an influence. Caryn James of The New York Times described a May 2004 meeting between producers and writers planning this episode: "...a group college flashback, with pens and spiral notebooks scattered across a table and long pauses." George Pelecanos, a writer for other season three episodes, provided research for the dogfighting subplot prior to his upcoming novel about animal abuse, Drama City.

== Reception ==
For the San Jose Mercury News, Charlie McCollum praised Price's writing as an example of "compelling storytelling and crisp dialogue" and the movie theater encounter between the police and drug dealers as "one particularly priceless scene". Alan Pergament of The Buffalo News called the scene of Colvin comparing undercover narcotics investigations to Prohibition "one of the most clever bits of writing". Alan Sepinwall also observed regarding Colvin's decision: "The institutionalized approach we see the average cop on this series (here represented by Herc and Carver) take is to focus on the tiny picture that's staring them in the face and ignore anything that might improve the bigger picture."

Quoting Colvin calling comparing drug enforcement to "sweeping leaves on a windy day", Bret McCabe commented in a 2004 feature in the Baltimore City Paper: "The resigned metaphor fits squarely into the show’s realistic worldview, but this new season takes it out of the institutional hierarchies of the drug trade and work force and applies it to the sprawling nebula of a whole city."

In a 2009 retrospective review for The Guardian, Judith Soal found this episode to explore themes of masculinity in the dogfighting scene and "two Americas" in the opening scene about a "po' house" bought by admirers of Edgar Allan Poe.
