= The Wire (The Wire episode) =

- The Wire episode
- Episode no.: Season 1 Episode 6
- Directed by: Ed Bianchi
- Story by: David Simon; Ed Burns
- Teleplay by: David Simon
- Original air date: July 7, 2002
- Running time: 59 minutes

Episode chronology
← Previous "The Pager"	Next → "One Arrest"
- The Wire season 1

"The Wire" is the sixth episode of the first season of the American crime drama The Wire. The episode was written by David Simon from a story by David Simon and Ed Burns and was directed by Ed Bianchi. It premiered on July 7, 2002, on HBO in the U.S. In the episode, the Baltimore police struggles to surveil the Barksdale criminal organization but finds a potential lead following the murder of a man who had been in a relationship with robber Omar Little.

On its debut, the episode had nearly three million viewers, ranking second in the Nielsen Media Research weekly U.S. premium cable ratings. The Star-Ledger praised the character development and acting. Regarding the cast, Ed Norris made his series debut.

== Plot summary ==
Omar's boyfriend Brandon has been murdered. Wallace wakes up in his squatter apartment and goes through his routine of readying several children in his charge for school. Police arrive in the neighborhood and, as Wallace and Poot leave the house, they see Brandon's body. Across town, D'Angelo and Shardene discuss their blossoming relationship.

Wallace expresses his anguish at seeing Brandon's body. D'Angelo unsympathetically reminds Wallace that he knew what would happen to Brandon, and reminds him that killing is part of "the game" of drug dealing in Baltimore. Stringer tells D'Angelo they are bringing Bodie home following his recent arrests. At a court hearing, Barksdale attorney Maurice Levy lies to defend Bodie's actions, causing the judge to set him free on the condition that he makes regular phone calls to a probation officer. Herc and Carver later pick up Bodie, assuming he absconded from custody a second time, and are surprised that he managed to get released.

Avon, Stringer and Stinkum visit the Pit and deliver reward money to D'Angelo and Wallace for their part in finding Brandon; Avon also tells D'Angelo that Wee-Bey and Bird killed him. D'Angelo assures Stringer that there are no snitches in his crew. D'Angelo, still withholding payment from the Pit crew, finds his lookout, a girl named Cassandra, with groceries. She reveals she has been conspiring with Sterling to steal small amounts of drugs and sell them on the side. In order to protect them from punishment, D'Angelo reassigns them elsewhere and tells nobody except Wallace.

With Johnny released from medical care, Bubbles returns to the streets. The pair run a short con to steal copper pipes and resell them to fund their drug addictions. Bubbles and Johnny plan to steal the same copper pipes back from the site the contractor is working on. When Johnny goes out to buy more drugs, he is arrested.

McNulty meets with Rawls and Landsman. Rawls tells McNulty he expects the Barksdale investigation to wrap up in a week's time, which McNulty has no intention of doing. Pressured by Rawls, Landsman orders Bunk to charge the Barksdales in the old murder cases. McNulty, Greggs and Freamon expect issuing charges will prompt Avon to change his operation and negate all their work. Daniels fails to dissuade Rawls, but convinces Burrell to overrule him. Rawls responds by asking Santangelo to keep him informed of anything McNulty does that might be used against him.

In the detail office, Freamon notes the high level of pager activity the previous night. The new wiretaps on the payphones legally require officers to monitor them; Herc is dismayed that this will mean long hours of surveillance work. Freamon is angry at his co-workers' laziness and asks what they expected when they joined the detail. After Stinkum chastises Bodie for using his name on the phone, Freamon explains to Prez that the call should be marked "pertinent" because it is evidence of conspiracy, even without providing hard evidence of drugs. Prez shows an aptitude and interest in meticulously tracking the wiretaps, even asking an impressed Daniels if they can get additional filing cabinets. Daniels berates Polk for stumbling in drunk and orders him to either get to work or check into medical for alcohol abuse; Polk chooses the latter.

McNulty meets with Vernon Holley and Ed Norris, the detectives working Brandon's murder, and discusses the potential link to the Barksdales. McNulty gets a call from Omar while minding his sons – he is forced to bring them along to the morgue with Omar. On seeing his lover's body, Omar screams, which the boys hear. Omar visits the detail, which has been able to tie Brandon's murder to the pager activity. McNulty is angry that they were unable to use the information, complaining that they are continually one step behind. Freamon and McNulty interview the arcade owner and Freamon matches a nearby payphone to the one used the night before. Omar offers to be a witness in the Gant case. The episode ends with police photographs of Brandon's mutilated corpse on Daniels' desk.

== Production ==
=== Epigraph ===
... and all the pieces matter.

— Freamon

Freamon uses this phrase to describe the importance of the individual calls recorded by their wiretap device to Prez. Simon has also described it as referring to the need for the viewer to concentrate on all aspects of the show to follow the plot.

=== Credits ===
==== Starring cast ====
Although credited, Deirdre Lovejoy does not appear in this episode.

==== Guest stars ====
1. Seth Gilliam as Detective Ellis Carver
2. Domenick Lombardozzi as Detective Thomas "Herc" Hauk
3. Clarke Peters as Detective Lester Freamon
4. Jim True-Frost as Detective Roland "Prez" Pryzbylewski
5. Leo Fitzpatrick as Johnny
6. J. D. Williams as Preston "Bodie" Broadus
7. Michael B. Jordan as Wallace
8. Corey Parker Robinson as Detective Leander Sydnor
9. Michael K. Williams as Omar Little
10. Nat Benchley as Detective Augustus Polk
11. Richard De Angelis as Major Raymond Foerster
12. Michael Salconi as Detective Michael Santangelo
13. Delaney Williams as Sergeant Jay Landsman
14. Michael Kevin Darnall as Brandon
15. Wendy Grantham as Shardene Innes
16. Michael Kostroff as Maurice Levy
17. Caroline G. Pleasant as Bodie's Grandmother
18. Antonio Cordova as Michael McNulty
19. Ed Norris as Detective Ed Norris
20. Eric Ryan as Sean McNulty
21. Brian Anthony Wilson as Detective Vernon Holley
22. Tray Chaney as Malik "Poot" Carr
23. Gil Deeble as Hucklebuck
24. Erik Todd Dellums as Dr. Randall Frazier
25. Brandon Price as Anton "Stinkum" Artis

=== Music ===
This episode is one of the few in which the soundtrack features non-diegetic music. In a slow motion sequence (also a rarity) featuring Avon, Stringer and Stinkum in the low-rises, a piece called "Wax Box Music" by Florian Mosleh / Miles Gannett / Jason McMillan under the name: "Lorem Ipsum" is played. Usually only season finales feature music not emanating from an on-screen source.

The selection playing during the final scene, where Daniels advises McNulty that he has managed to buy them some time, is 'Fleurette Africaine' performed by Duke Ellington, Charles Mingus and Max Roach, which appears on their album Money Jungle recorded in 1962.

=== First appearances ===
This episode marks the first appearance of homicide Detectives Ed Norris and Vernon Holley, seen investigating the death of Brandon. Ed Norris is played by former Baltimore Police Commissioner Ed Norris; the character's personality is based on the real Norris, but his history is entirely different from his portrayer's. According to Homicide: A Year on the Killing Streets, there was actually an African-American detective in the Baltimore Police Department homicide division named Vernon Holley.

Also seen for the first time is Sean McNulty, the oldest son of Jimmy and Elena McNulty.

== Broadcast ==
This episode premiered July 7, 2002, on HBO in the U.S. In the UK, this episode had its broadcast TV debut on April 6, 2009, on BBC Two.

== Reception ==
On its debut, the episode had nearly 2.98 million viewers and was the second most-watched U.S. premium cable show of the week ending July 7, 2002, as ranked by Nielsen Media Research.

In 2008, Alan Sepinwall commented for The Star-Ledger: "We'd had hints before now that Wallace was just a kid playing at a deadly, grown-up game, but the episode's opening sequence simultaneously shows off his childlike and adult sides." The acting of Michael K. Williams as Omar Little attracted praise from critics such as Sepinwall: "As the man outside the system, and the show's lone character drawn slightly larger than life, Omar would stand out with almost any competent actor playing him, but Williams is, indeed, superb." For The Guardian, Paul Owen praised the character development of Little and the emotional depth shown by Williams: "...tender, full of rage, totally fresh and free of stereotypes."
