= Hamsterdam =

- The Wire episode
- Episode no.: Season 3 Episode 4
- Directed by: Ernest Dickerson
- Story by: David Simon; George Pelecanos
- Teleplay by: George Pelecanos
- Original air date: October 10, 2004
- Running time: 58 minutes

Episode chronology
← Previous "Dead Soldiers"	Next → "Straight and True"
- The Wire season 3

"Hamsterdam" (called "Amsterdam" in some releases) is the 29th episode (ep. 4 of season 3) of the American crime drama The Wire. The episode was written by George Pelecanos from a story by David Simon & George Pelecanos and was directed by Ernest Dickerson. It debuted on October 10, 2004, on HBO in the U.S. The plot focuses on Baltimore Police struggling to surveil crime boss Stringer Bell and attempting to limit drug dealing to select streets, while Tommy Carcetti launches his campaign for Mayor of Baltimore.

On its premiere, the episode attracted nearly 1.45 million viewers, with positive reviews by The Guardian, HitFix, and the San Jose Mercury News.

== Plot ==
While having dinner with white friends, Tommy Carcetti expresses disapproval when they make disparaging comments about African Americans and tells them he intends to run for mayor. He approaches Theresa D'Agostino, a political consultant he knows from law school, and courts her interest in becoming his campaign manager. D'Agostino dismisses his chances since he would be a white candidate running in a majority-black city. Elsewhere, Bunk is unable to find Dozerman's missing gun. He asks McNulty to locate Omar to help with the murders of Tank and Tosha. Later, a drunk McNulty visits Pearlman's house and demands to come inside, when he notices Daniels' car out front. Daniels and Pearlman see McNulty through the window.

In the Western, Colvin attends a town hall meeting where residents vent their frustrations on rampant crime and the perceived lack of policing. Colvin admits everything they have done has failed; while the residents seem to appreciate his candor, they are enraged that he has put forth no tangible solutions. Later, Colvin looks into working security at Johns Hopkins University following his retirement. When Carver's squad fails to corral the Western's drug crews into Colvin's free zones, Colvin orders school buses to round up the dealers. At a school assembly, Colvin tries to explain how the free zones will operate, only to face hostility and inattentiveness from students. Elsewhere, Cutty learns that his landscaping crew is entirely composed of ex-convicts. He approaches Slim Charles, offering himself for anything that pays.

McNulty observes a meeting between Bell, developer Andy Krawczyk and State Senator Clay Davis, who discuss plans for revamping Bell's properties as residences in gentrifying areas. Donette tells Bell about McNulty's visit, but Bell convinces her that D'Angelo's death couldn't be a murder because no one would have risked killing him in the same prison as Avon. Meanwhile, Avon is granted parole despite Pearlman's protests, and Cutty, Slim Charles, Gerard, and Sapper survey one of their dealers who has been short on his count. Later, Bodie hosts a party where he plies Cutty with drugs and women. At the behest of McNulty and Greggs, Bubbles explores the Barksdale territory in the Western and sees Marlo talking to Fruit, memorizing his license plate number.

Back at the detail, Freamon admonishes McNulty and Greggs for showing disloyalty towards Daniels by investigating Bell, despite what the lieutenant has done for them. Bubbles reports to the detectives about how Marlo has stayed out of the collaboration between the Barksdales and the East Side dealers. Using the license plate number, they pull up Marlo's criminal record. Greggs visits Homicide to talk to Detective Vernon Holley, who describes Marlo as pure evil. She theorizes that Marlo is working for Bell. Greggs spends a day with Bubbles mapping out the territories of the dealers, learning that they are using disposable cell phones.

McNulty visits Bell's community college and, using the school's phone records, traces a cell number to Bell. Freamon has Prez check property purchasing records for Bell's front organization. From this information, the detail learns that Bell is trying to build a "legitimate" business as a property developer, either parallel to or instead of his illicit drug operation. McNulty worries about how they can wiretap Bell's disposable phones. Freamon tells McNulty to swallow his pride and return to the Major Case Unit. Daniels has an awkward drink with McNulty as they discuss Daniels' new relationship with Pearlman.

== Production ==
=== Epigraph ===
Why you got to go and fuck with the program?

— Fruit

Fruit makes this statement in response to Carver and his team trying to move his crew into one of the new drug tolerant zones. This also ties in with Carcetti's announcement of running for mayor in Baltimore, despite his ethnicity, as well as Cutty's difficulty at changing his ways. To a lesser extent, it can apply to McNulty and Rhonda's dysfunctional relationship.

=== Credits ===
==== Starring cast ====
Although credited, John Doman and Michael K. Williams do not appear in this episode.

==== Guest stars ====
1. Callie Thorne as Elena McNulty
2. Isiah Whitlock, Jr. as Senator Clayton "Clay" Davis
3. Tray Chaney as Malik "Poot" Carr
4. Chad L. Coleman as Dennis "Cutty" Wise
5. Benjamin Busch as Officer Anthony Colicchio
6. Jay Landsman as Lieutenant Dennis Mello
7. Delaney Williams as Sergeant Jay Landsman
8. Richard Burton as Sean "Shamrock" McGinty
9. Brandon Fobbs as Fruit
10. Anwan Glover as Slim Charles
11. Mayo Best as Gerard
12. R. Emery Bright as Community Relations Sergeant
13. Clarence Clemons as Roman (credited as Clarence Clemens)
14. Brandan T. Tate as Sapper
15. Maria Broom as Marla Daniels
16. Shamyl Brown as Donette
17. Brandy Burre as Theresa D'Agostino
18. Vera Holley as School principal
19. Muna Otaru as college records clerk
20. Tony Cordova as Sean McNulty
21. Michael Kostroff as Maurice Levy
22. Eugene Little as Landscaping boss
23. Michael Willis as Andy Krawczyk
24. Brian Anthony Wilson as Detective Vernon Holley

Clarence Clemons' name is misspelled as Clarence Clemens in the credits.

==== Uncredited appearances ====
- Joilet F. Harris as Officer Caroline Massey
- Ryan Sands as Officer Lloyd "Truck" Garrick
- De'Rodd Hearns as Puddin
- Justin Burley as Justin
- Melvin T. Russell as Jamal
- Edward Green as Spider
- Rico Sterling as Tyrell
- Marc Krinsky as Angelo Martin
- Kay Lawal as concerned resident
- Unknown as William Gant's cousin
- Unknown as Pete Sinopoli

=== First appearances ===
- Spider: a young corner boy who is brought into Colvin's pep talk.
- Theresa D'Agostino: campaign manager for Carcetti

== Reception ==
"Hamsterdam" had nearly 1.45 million viewers on its debut, ranking third in Nielsen Media Research ratings among U.S. premium cable shows for the week ending October 10, 2004.

In a 2004 review, Charlie McCollum of the San Jose Mercury News rated the first four episodes of season three four out of four stars and considered the writing by Pelecanos an example of "compelling storytelling and crisp dialogue".

Alan Sepinwall of HitFix responded to the argument between McNulty and Freamon: "...I love that the show was willing to go there, and to show McNulty unafraid to put even his closest allies behind his personal demons." Paul Owen of The Guardian observed a common theme in this episode among characters Bubbles and Cutty: "...find[ing] the grind and the low pay of a labouring job hard to take after the respect and money that comes easily in the drug world."
