= The Pager =

- The Wire episode
- Episode no.: Season 1 Episode 5
- Directed by: Clark Johnson
- Story by: David Simon; Ed Burns
- Teleplay by: Ed Burns
- Original air date: June 30, 2002
- Running time: 60 minutes

Episode chronology
| ← Previous "Old Cases" | Next → "The Wire" |

"The Pager" is the fifth episode of the first season of the American crime drama The Wire. The episode was written by Ed Burns from a story by David Simon and Ed Burns and was directed by Clark Johnson. It premiered June 30, 2002, on HBO in the U.S. The story focuses on the Barksdale gang attempting counter-measures against the Baltimore police's wiretapping.

On its debut, "The Pager" had nearly three million viewers on HBO. Entertainment Weekly and The Star-Ledger praised the episode's depth of story development.

== Plot summary ==
Phelan signs the wiretap affidavit for a clone of D'Angelo's pager. Freamon finds that each pager message consists of a seven-digit phone number and a two-digit identifying tag. The phone numbers used do not work, so Freamon postulates that they are using a code to mask the numbers. The code is ultimately cracked by Prez. Freamon visits Daniels' office and tells him that they need audio surveillance on the payphones surrounding the projects to make the case.

Bubbles tells Greggs where to find Omar's van. She and McNulty sit on the van and wait for Omar to show up, hoping to convince him to become an informant. McNulty calls Elena and asks for his sons to come over, but Elena refuses to allow the visit. Meanwhile, Carver and Herc follow Bodie to the Pit and violently arrest him for absconding from juvenile detention. Bodie refuses to consider a deal, and the detectives respond to his insults with a beating. However, while waiting to hand Bodie over to juvenile intake, they end up playing pool with him.

Bunk receives a ballistics report confirming that the shell casing from the Kresson murder is linked to the Barksdales, just as Landsman predicted. At a cemetery, McNulty tries to convince Omar that they share a common enemy in Avon, but Omar thinks that working with the police is wrong. McNulty reveals that Bailey has been killed; though Omar pretends to be unfazed, he reveals two things: that a Barksdale soldier named Bird killed William Gant, and that he knows that Bubbles is their informant.

After receiving a silent phone call, Avon tells Wee-Bey to remove the phone lines. Wee-Bey tells Avon he is worried they are being paranoid. Meanwhile, Omar, Bailey and Brandon discuss their next "rip" on an East Baltimore corner. Omar draws out a plan to trap the dealers in the alley they use. He approaches from the front carrying a shotgun while nonchalantly whistling "The Farmer in the Dell", which scares the dealers.

In the Pit, Bodie and Poot discuss HIV. Bodie notices Wallace a distance away playing with an action figure and throws a bottle at the wall near him in anger, yelling that the crew keeps getting robbed because they're not on their guard. D'Angelo takes Donette out to an expensive restaurant. Requesting a quieter table, the waiter informs D'Angelo that the other table is reserved. Donette argues that D'Angelo should have been more forceful, but he worries about seeming out of place. He wonders to Donette if there are markers of their social class that they cannot avoid showing. Donette assures D'Angelo that anyone who can pay belongs at the restaurant.

Avon and Stringer discuss taking over the Edmondson Avenue corners, as they are wide open. Avon suggests that Stinkum should run the territory. Bubbles tells Johnny that he is on a mission to bring down the Barksdale hoppers that beat him, but Johnny cannot understand why Bubbles is voluntarily working with the police as he feels his misfortune is all part of the "game." Avon and D'Angelo visit Avon's brother, who has been hospitalized in a vegetative state. Avon tells D'Angelo that one mistake could see either of them end up like his brother and that the fear motivates Avon to work harder. Later, Poot and Wallace spot Brandon in an arcade and notify D'Angelo. D'Angelo pages the news in from the Pit phones. Although all the pages are logged at the detail office, the calls themselves are not recorded.

== Production ==
=== Epigraph ===
...a little slow, a little late.

— Avon Barksdale

=== Credits ===
==== Starring cast ====
Although credited, John Doman and Frankie Faison do not appear in this episode.

==== Guest stars ====
1. Peter Gerety as Judge Daniel Phelan
2. Seth Gilliam as Detective Ellis Carver
3. Domenick Lombardozzi as Detective Thomas "Herc" Hauk
4. Clarke Peters as Detective Lester Freamon
5. Jim True-Frost as Detective Roland "Prez" Pryzbylewski
6. Hassan Johnson as Roland "Wee-Bey" Brice
7. J. D. Williams as Preston "Bodie" Broadus
8. Michael K. Williams as Omar Little
9. Michael B. Jordan as Wallace
10. Clayton LeBouef as Wendell "Orlando" Blocker
11. Delaney Williams as Sergeant Jay Landsman
12. Nat Benchley as Augustus Polk
13. Shamyl Brown as Donette
14. Tray Chaney as Malik "Poot" Carr
15. Wendy Grantham as Shardene Innes
16. Michael Kevin Darnall as Brandon Wright
17. Curtis Montez as Sterling
18. Brandon Price as Anton "Stinkum" Artis
19. Lance Williams as John Bailey
20. David J. Smolar as Restaurant Piano Player

=== First appearances ===
- Marquis "Bird" Hilton: A foul-mouthed Barksdale organization enforcer. Though apparently responsible for the murder of Gant in the first episode, this is the first time Bird appears onscreen. Bird is played by rapper Fredro Starr, from the group Onyx, who becomes the second of eight musicians to play minor recurring roles on The Wire (others include Method Man and Steve Earle).

== Broadcast ==
"The Pager" premiered June 30, 2002, on HBO in the U.S. In the UK, this episode had its broadcast TV debut on April 3, 2009, on BBC Two.

== Reception ==
On its debut, "The Pager" had nearly 2.97 million viewers and a 1.9 rating as measured by Nielsen Media Research.

For Entertainment Weekly, Ken Tucker praised the episode for deep development of otherwise slow plot lines. Tucker also praised the show's naturalistic dialogue and director Clark Johnson for providing "beautifully detailed" acting from Gerety, Peters, and Reddick.

Alan Sepinwall, in a 2008 retrospective for The Star-Ledger, contrasted this episode against the first four of The Wire: "After all the rampaging incompetence and bureaucratic interference we bore witness in the first four episodes, it's almost startling to watch an episode in which virtually everybody knows what they're doing."

In 2009, Steve Busfield of The Guardian featured readers' comments claiming this episode had allusions to Shakespeare such as Richard III, for instance: "Stringer Bell, like Richard Duke of Gloucester (Later Richard III), was a loyal supporter of Edward who then betrayed his family and seized power for himself."
