= Lessons (The Wire) =

- The Wire episode
- Episode no.: Season 1 Episode 8
- Directed by: Gloria Muzio
- Story by: David Simon; Ed Burns
- Teleplay by: David Simon
- Original air date: July 28, 2002
- Running time: 56 minutes

Episode chronology
← Previous "One Arrest"	Next → "Game Day"
- The Wire season 1

"Lessons" is the eighth episode of the first season of the American crime drama The Wire. The episode was written by David Simon from a story by David Simon and Ed Burns and was directed by Gloria Muzio. It originally premiered in the United States on July 28, 2002, on HBO. In the episode, the Baltimore police arrests a suspect only to encounter internal conflict after discovering the suspect works for a local politician, while Omar Little seeks revenge after his home is burglarized by the Barksdale Organization.

Garnering nearly 3.3 million viewers during its broadcast, The Guardian and The Star-Ledger praised the episode for character development, especially regarding Omar Little, and depictions of social mobility in U.S. inner cities. Omar's line, "Come at the king, you best not miss," has been cited as a memorable quote from the series.

== Plot summary ==
Poot asks Wallace to return to work, who refuses; Poot later reports his concerns to D'Angelo. Wee-Bey, Stinkum and Savino raid Omar's apartment and destroy his van; Omar witnesses this from his hiding place across the street. They pick up D'Angelo, who mentions Orlando's proposition of selling cocaine on the side; the others tell him to consult Avon. Orlando is beaten by Avon for considering involvement in the drug trade.

Barksdale soldiers celebrate Stinkum's upcoming promotion, contingent on killing a dealer named Scar and threatening his crew. At the party, D'Angelo notices a drunk dancer, Keisha, held by Wee-Bey; D'Angelo later finds her dead, implied to be from an overdose after being drugged and raped by Wee-Bey. Later, D'Angelo discusses his future with Shardene, who encourages him to pursue other options if unhappy with drug trafficking. As Wee-Bey and Stinkum prepare to hit Scar's corner, Omar ambushes them, killing Stinkum and wounding Wee-Bey. Avon raises his bounty on Omar, while Stringer suggests luring him out under the guise of a truce.

McNulty spots Stringer while at Northeast Market with his sons; he instructs them to follow Stringer, eventually recording Stringer's license plate. Bunk disapproves of involving children in police work. Meanwhile, Herc and Carver, while helping the detail identify phone users from the wiretap, stop Senator Davis' driver, Damien "Day-Day" Price; they find a bag full of cash in his car. Burrell threatens to shut down the investigation unless the money is returned, citing Price's political connections.

Daniels tells Marla that the department brass fears wiretaps because they expose links between drug trafficking and local politicians. Judge Phelan later intervenes, threatening Burrell with a contempt charge if he terminates the wiretap prematurely. McNulty tails Stringer and discovers he is secretly attending an economics class at Baltimore City Community College. Later, at a Barksdale print shop, Stringer scolds his crew for unprofessionalism, citing elements from the course he was studying.

The detail learns Omar killed Stinkum. McNulty and Greggs question him, but Omar refuses to confess. While at the detail office, Omar notices a photo connecting Avon to Orlando's club. Greggs worries she pushed Omar into becoming a witness, but Freamon reassures her that justice can be served without Omar. They later identify Shardene as a possible informant. Bunk learns detective Ray Cole has been assigned Stinkum's murder. He and McNulty agree to protect Omar; they agree among themselves to give Cole a closed case to make up for not revealing Omar's role in the murder.

That night, while drinking, Bunk becomes intoxicated and burns his clothes to hide evidence of infidelity, and McNulty is called by the woman to take him home. Before passing out in McNulty's son's bunk bed, Bunk mumbles that McNulty is bad for the people around him.

== Epigraph ==
Come at the king, you best not miss.

— Omar

Omar uses this phrase while taunting Wee-Bey after shooting Stinkum. HowStuffWorks regards this line as "the most famous quote" from The Wire. On a 2020 episode of The Ringer podcast The Wire: Way Down in the Hole, Jemele Hill and Van Lathan ranked it the best line from the show for what Lathan called "any situation where you're thinking about taking a risk."

== Credits ==
=== Starring cast ===
Although credited, John Doman, Deirdre Lovejoy, and Andre Royo do not appear in this episode.

=== Guest stars ===
- Peter Gerety as Judge Daniel Phelan
- Seth Gilliam as Detective Ellis Carver
- Domenick Lombardozzi as Detective Thomas "Herc" Hauk
- Clarke Peters as Detective Lester Freamon
- Jim True-Frost as Detective Roland "Prez" Pryzbylewski
- Hassan Johnson as Wee-Bey Brice
- Corey Parker-Robinson as Detective Leander Sydnor
- Michael B. Jordan as Wallace
- Michael K. Williams as Omar Little
- Maria Broom as Marla Daniels
- Antonio Cordova as Michael McNulty
- Wendy Grantham as Shardene Innes
- Eric Ryan as Sean McNulty
- Tray Chaney as Poot Carr
- Clayton LeBouef as Wendell "Orlando" Blocker
- Brandon Price as Anton "Stinkum" Artis
- Donnell Rawlings as Damien "Day-Day" Price

== Broadcast ==
"Lessons" debuted July 28, 2002, in the U.S. on HBO. In the UK, this episode had its broadcast TV debut on April 8, 2009, on BBC Two.

== Reception ==
On its premiere, "Lessons" had an estimated 3.31 million viewers and ranked third in Nielsen Media Research's U.S. premium cable ratings for the week ending July 28, 2002.

Critics noted the character development and social themes of this episode. For The Star-Ledger, Alan Sepinwall considered it an example of depicting "the tremendous waste that the drug culture has created in inner-city America." Specifically regarding Stringer Bell, Sepinwall finds he has "more business savvy than your average TV druglord" by taking college economics classes. In a 2009 retrospective for The Guardian, Mark Smith noted that the episode was pivotal in depicting Omar Little: "The mythology of the man, the character and the code starts here."
