= All Prologue =

- The Wire episode
- Episode no.: Season 2 Episode 6
- Directed by: Steve Shill
- Story by: David Simon; Ed Burns; Joy Kecken; Rafael Alvarez
- Original air date: July 6, 2003
- Running time: 58 minutes

Episode chronology
← Previous "Undertow"	Next → "Backwash"
- The Wire season 2

"All Prologue" is the sixth episode of the second season of the American police drama The Wire. It originally aired on July 6, 2003, on HBO in the U.S. The episode was written by David Simon, Ed Burns, Joy Kecken, and Rafael Alvarez and was directed by Steve Shill. In the episode, the Baltimore Police investigate suspicious financial activities by the stevedore labor union, and Omar Little testifies in a murder trial.

Watched by nearly four million viewers, "All Prologue" was the second most popular program on U.S. premium cable television of its debut week. The episode was critically praised, especially for the scenes of Omar Little testifying in court. Michael K. Williams spoke positively of portraying Little in this episode. The Futon Critic named "All Prologue" one of the top ten television episodes of 2003.

== Plot ==
When Omar takes the stand (without proper attire besides a flamboyant tie), he identifies Bird and the weapon used to kill William Gant. As they observe the trial, Stringer discusses with McNulty whether Omar really witnessed the Gant murder. Levy subjects Omar to a harsh cross-examination, but Omar quickly turns the attacks back on Levy. After the jury returns a guilty verdict, Judge Daniel Phelan refuses Levy's request for an appeal bond and states that he will almost certainly sentence Bird to life in prison. Afterward, McNulty asks Omar if he really saw Bird commit the murder. Omar responds, "You really askin'?"

Freamon tells Daniels that Frank lives within his means, while his stevedores union is in financial trouble. Freamon and Prez have found a paper trail through campaign finance records linking the union to $70,000 in contributions. Herc reports that they have had success making street-level hand-to-hands but have found no ties between portside drug dealers and the union. Beadie suggests that the union is making extra money by facilitating smuggling through the port. Daniels reassigns Prez and Greggs to focus on the vice trade, and Freamon works with Beadie and Bunk to look at container movements.

McNulty visits his ex-wife Elena at her real estate office, and she agrees to go on a date with him on Friday night. When they go to dinner, McNulty drinks only wine and lies to Elena, claiming that he's not drinking so much anymore. Elena says she's still angry with him, but when McNulty asks for a chance to reunite with her, she invites him to bed instead. Later, over drinks, Bunk laments the pressure he feels from Rawls, while McNulty says he wants to make another go of things with Elena.

Greggs meets with Shardene Innes for help tracking down Eastern European girls working in the vice trade. She discusses her strip club assignment with Cheryl, who is angry that Greggs has returned to detective work and insists on accompanying her. A friend of Shardene's tells the detectives that there is a madam who organizes the girls and keeps them at a motel, where they are under guard when not working. After visiting the club, Greggs takes Cheryl to the port and explains how the Jane Does died. Beadie shows Bunk and Daniels how to track container movements on the computer. Beadie and Freamon are able to tie the missing containers to Horseface.

Nick asks Vondas for help in resolving Ziggy's problems with Cheese. Nick later tags along with Sergei to the latter's meeting with Cheese and watches from the car as Sergei and his associates draw guns on Cheese's crew. Sergei then arranges a meeting in which Proposition Joe agrees to compensate Ziggy for his torched car. However, Joe makes it clear that Ziggy and Nick would both be dead if not for their association with the Greeks. Nick, Ziggy and Johnny Fifty deliver the chemicals in exchange for drugs. Tempted by the additional payoff and Ziggy's pleas, Nick opts to take half the payment in cash and the rest in drugs. After a union meeting, Nick goes to the bar and gives Ziggy his compensation. Ziggy ostentatiously lights a cigarette with a $100 bill, causing Frank to leave in disgust. Outside, he asks Ziggy where he got his money and how he got his bruises.

Stringer delivers an envelope of cash to Leech, a contact from Washington, D.C., concerning a contract killing. Brianna visits D'Angelo and tries to persuade him to use Avon's set-up of Tilghman to shave time from his sentence. D'Angelo refuses, reminding his mother that she taught him to stand up for himself. He tells her to let him deal with things on his own and to take the fall for the Barksdale Organization. He then asks her to tell Stringer, Avon and Donette to leave him alone. D'Angelo passes Avon in the corridor and refuses to talk to him. While working in the prison library, D'Angelo is followed by an inmate named Mugs. Mugs garrotes D'Angelo with a leather strap, then ties it to a doorknob and places D'Angelo's hands in his pants, making his death appear to be the result of suicide.

== Production ==
=== Epigraph ===
It don't matter that some fool say he different...

— D'Angelo

D'Angelo makes this comment when discussing F. Scott Fitzgerald's novel The Great Gatsby and the theme of Gatsby's inability to escape his past and who he was no matter how much he tried to cover it, a sentiment that D'Angelo shares as he is unable to escape that he is a Barksdale. It also refers to Jimmy McNulty's attempts at reconciliation with his wife.

=== Credits ===
==== Starring cast ====
Although credited, John Doman and Deirdre Lovejoy do not appear in this episode.

==== Guest stars ====
1. Seth Gilliam as Detective Ellis Carver
2. Domenick Lombardozzi as Detective Thomas "Herc" Hauk
3. Jim True-Frost as Detective Roland "Prez" Pryzbylewski
4. James Ransone as Ziggy Sobotka
5. Pablo Schreiber as Nick Sobotka
6. Melanie Nicholls-King as Cheryl
7. Callie Thorne as Elena McNulty
8. Michael K. Williams as Omar Little
9. Michael Hyatt as Brianna Barksdale
10. Michael Kostroff as Maurice Levy
11. Susan Rome as ASA Ilene Nathan
12. Robert F. Chew as Proposition Joe
13. Wendy Grantham as Shardene Innes
14. Lev Gorens as Eton Ben-Eleazer
15. Charley Scalies as Thomas "Horseface" Pakusa
16. Fredro Starr as Marquis "Bird" Hilton
17. Chris Ashworth as Sergei Malatov
18. Luray Cooper as Nat Coxson
19. Erik Todd Dellums as ME Randall Frazier
20. Jeffrey Fugitt as Officer Claude Diggins
21. Richard Price as book group leader

==== Uncredited appearances ====
- Peter Gerety as Judge Daniel Phelan
- Harold L. Able, Sr. as Moonshot
- J. Valenteen Gregg as Chess
- Doug Lory as Little Big Roy
- Bus Howard as Vernon "Ott" Mottley
- Jeffrey Pratt Gordon as Johnny "Fifty" Spamanto
- Dakota Anderson as Mugs
- Jacques Derosena as Leech
- Toni Hunter as Stripper

=== First appearances ===
- Eton Ben-Eleazer: Israeli lieutenant in charge of The Greek's drug supply operation.

== Reception ==
The episode drew an average of 4.11 million viewers and was the second most watched program on U.S. premium cable television (after lead-in Sex and the City) for the week ending July 6, 2003.

Omar Little's courtroom scene in this episode was described by The Guardian in 2008 as the character's "defining scene" and was among actor Michael K. Williams' favorites. However, in a 2009 review for The Guardian, Paul Owen questioned whether this scene depicted Maurice Levy's legal defense of drug criminals as "morally wrong".

The Futon Critic named it the ninth best episode of 2003, saying "There's simply been nobody like Omar (Michael K. Williams) on television before and he absolutely steals the show in this episode as he's called on to testify for the D.A.'s office. After being grilled by the defense for his less than moral activities, Omar responds with an amazing, funny and cheer inducing monologue about the legal system."

The tragic death of D'Angelo Barksdale was highlighted, with Samuel Walters of Dauntless Media stating that the episode drew on the show's "incredible wealth of character and story background" to "forge a powerfully emotional and meaningful episode". For The Star-Ledger, Alan Sepinwall called the episode "particularly extraordinary" and "densely packed with one hilarious, or moving, or outright tragic moment after another."
