= Barksdale Organization =

Fictional criminal organization from The Wire

- Founded: Mid 1990s
- Founded by: Avon Barksdale and Stringer Bell
- Founding location: Baltimore, Maryland, U.S.
- Years active: Mid 1990s – 2004
- Territory: West Baltimore
- Ethnicity: African American
- Criminal activities: Drug trafficking, bribery, conspiracy, contract killing, money laundering, witness intimidation, murder, and battery
- Allies: New Day Co-Op
- Rivals: Stanfield Organization, Omar's crew

The Barksdale Organization is a fictional drug-dealing gang on the television series The Wire. Many of the characters featured in season one of The Wire belong to this organization. Season 1 largely deals with the Baltimore Police Department setting up a Major Crimes Unit to investigate the Barksdale Organization, led by Avon Barksdale who is portrayed as the most powerful drug kingpin in Baltimore.

The gang's criminal activities include heroin and cocaine dealing, homicides (including killing witnesses in criminal cases against the gang), and money laundering. Avon Barksdale's power in west Baltimore was established some time before the events of season 1. The Barksdale Organization started a turf war for the city's largest public housing project. When they won the war and got the prized Franklin Terrace Towers, they had the best drug territory in the city and dominated the illicit heroin trade in west Baltimore. The show starts sometime after these events.

The Baltimore Police Department as a whole is portrayed as underfunded and apathetic. While the Major Crime Unit is able to arrest a number of people in the Barksdale Organization, including Avon, they lack the resources to build a strong enough case to permanently cripple the organization. All those arrested plead out and get light sentences (with the exception of Wee-Bey and D'Angelo). Avon's best friend and second-in-command Stringer Bell runs the organization until Avon is released from prison in season 3.

Ultimately, a second prolonged investigation by the Major Crimes Unit, the organization's bloody wars against both stickup man Omar Little, as well as the emerging Stanfield Organization, and internal dissent within the group's upper leadership led to the Barksdale Organization's collapse in the fall of 2004. With most of the Barksdale Organization in prison or dead, the Stanfield Organization becomes the dominant drug trafficking group in West Baltimore.

== Structure ==
Avon ran the organization as a hierarchy with himself at the top and Stringer directly below him. Stringer oversees the drug operation and advises Avon on all matters. They were both isolated from the drugs, handling only money. Avon had a number of enforcers (soldiers) who served him through protection, contract killings, and intimidation work, including childhood friend Wee-Bey Brice. Avon himself kept an extremely low profile, eschewing overt displays of wealth so as not to attract attention, avoiding being photographed, not having a driver's license, and owning nothing in his own name. The Barksdales retained attorney Maurice Levy, who advised them on how to counter police investigations and represented members of the Barksdale organization at hearings and trials.

At the beginning of the series, Avon is the top player in the West Baltimore drug trade. His territory includes the prized Franklin Terrace Towers, a massive public housing project consisting of six high rise apartment buildings. These towers provided the best territory in the city to sell drugs. The Barksdales have a crew at each tower that sells heroin and cocaine 24 hours a day. The Barksdales also control other smaller territories, including a nearby low-rise housing project referred to as "the Pit".

The organization laundered its profits through various fronts, including a funeral parlor, Orlando's, and a property developing company named B&B. It also invested in property, never actually using either Avon or Stringer's names on official papers. It also made campaign contributions and later bribes for assistance with development contracts.

== Leadership ==
=== Avon Barksdale ===
Avon Barksdale (played by Wood Harris) is the head of the Barksdale organization. In season one, he is the target of an investigation by the Major Case Squad after homicide detective Jimmy McNulty, seemingly the only authoritative figure aware of Avon's presence or empire, reveals his identity to superiors. Avon is feared by other drug dealing criminal organizations in Baltimore due to his ferocity.

He is portrayed as hotheaded yet is also a shrewd and intuitive gangster. His drug empire includes the best territory in Baltimore for drug dealers. Together with his closest friend Stringer, Avon and their enforcers dominate the heroin trade in West Baltimore. Despite Stringer's attempts to move the two towards legitimacy, Avon shows little interest in leaving the drug business or West Baltimore.

=== Russell "Stringer" Bell ===
Stringer (played by Idris Elba) is Avon Barksdale's second-in-command, closest friend, and the main strategist behind coordinating their street dealing organization which he does as the main contact for all business. He also attends community college to better understand business and economics and to apply them to the drug trade. Together, Stringer and Avon operate out of a strip club where they discuss business, conduct meetings with their subordinates and launder money.

His greatest aspiration is to transition into the legitimate business world. Aside from wholesaling drug packages, Stringer wants to enter the business world and leave the violence. In the third season Stringer is killed by Omar Little and Brother Mouzone in his own commercial building that was in development at the time.

=== Sean "Shamrock" McGinty ===
Sean "Shamrock" McGinty, Stringer Bell loyalist, played by Richard Burton

- Played by: Richard Burton
- Appears in:

Season two: "Ebb Tide"; "Hot Shots"; "Hard Cases" and "Port in a Storm".
Season three: "Time After Time"; "All Due Respect"; "Dead Soldiers"; "Hamsterdam"; "Straight and True"; "Homecoming"; "Back Burners"; "Moral Midgetry"; "Slapstick"; "Reformation" and "Mission Accomplished".

Shamrock was Stringer Bell's main assistant while Avon Barksdale was in prison. Stringer sounds out his loyalty by having him followed on a trip to Philadelphia to collect a package of drugs, along with Bodie Broadus. The package was not delivered correctly, but Shamrock and Bodie keep to Stringer's orders and meticulously document their progress, and Stringer is satisfied with their response.

Stringer entrusts Shamrock with driving Bodie to dispose of weapons used in a misguided territory war after a young child was killed by a stray bullet. Unfortunately Bodie unknowingly drops the bag of guns onto a passing barge instead of into the water. Little comes of the mistake because Bodie had wiped the weapons clean of fingerprints.

Stringer entrusts Shamrock with the set-up of CO Dwight Tilghman to allow Avon to exchange information about Tilghman with the prison authorities for an early parole hearing. Stringer, Shamrock and Country follow Tilghman and learn that he smuggles heroin from Butchie into the prison. Stringer has Shamrock deliver a package of tainted narcotics to Tilghman through Butchie, causing several deaths in the prison. Shamrock also plants narcotics in Tilghman's car to make sure Avon could successfully inform on Tilghman.

By season three, Shamrock is Stringer's top assistant who oversees the technical aspects of drug distribution to the various drug dealing crews. Shamrock oversees Stringer's organizational meetings at the funeral home and is told to keep to Robert's Rules of Order. He tries to keep minutes at the first meeting of the New Day Co-Op, a group of major Baltimore drug players; Stringer curtly reminds him that he is taking notes on a criminal conspiracy.

Stringer uses Shamrock to insulate himself from the street; Shamrock takes phone calls on Stringer's behalf, then organizes face to face meetings at secure locations. Stringer put Shamrock in charge of overseeing Bernard in obtaining disposable cell phones used by the organization. Stringer insisted that Bernard buy a maximum of two phones from any one outlet. Once Shamrock takes over, he stops checking up on Bernard and Bernard begins to buy phones in bulk from Lester Freamon, an undercover officer in the Major Case unit investigating Stringer. Freamon thereby can supply the Barksdale crew with pre-wiretapped phones.

When Avon is paroled, Shamrock continues in his role as Stringer's assistant controlling their drug dealing through the lieutenants and crew chiefs. He is peripherally involved in Avon's turf war with Marlo Stanfield, passing messages back and forth to soldiers. Shamrock is arrested alongside Avon at the end of season three.

=== Slim Charles ===
Slim Charles was an enforcer hired by the Barksdales in season three when they needed muscle after the arrests of Savino, Wee-Bey and Bird and the deaths of Little Man and Stinkum. He proves himself to be capable and loyal on multiple occasions despite his lack of support. Upon Stringer Bell's death he became Avon Barksdale's second-in-command. After Avon's subsequent arrest, Slim Charles began working for Proposition Joe and the New Day Co-Op, an organization of which he eventually takes a leading role.

== Soldiers ==
=== Season one ===
==== Bird ====
- Played by: Fredro Starr
- Appears in:

Season one: "The Pager" (uncredited) and "One Arrest".
Season two: "All Prologue".

Marquis "Bird" Hilton is a foul-mouthed soldier in the Barksdale crew who is involved in the brutal murder of Omar Little's boyfriend and accomplice Brandon. As revenge, Omar cooperates with the police to provide testimony that Bird killed William Gant, a state witness against D'Angelo Barksdale as a warning to others not to testify. Because the police need a witness, Omar agrees to falsely testify that he saw Bird shoot Gant with his signature gun.

Omar further tells the police they will find Bird taking drugs (contrary to the rules of the Barksdale organization) and that they should be careful, as Bird is reckless. The arrest is made, and a ballistics report matches Bird's gun to the killing. Before the police begin interrogating Bird, Landsman takes a photo of the injuries on Bird's face so that he can't claim they were inflicted in custody.

Bird vehemently rejects their offer to provide information on the people he works for, throwing out as many foul-mouthed insults as he can. His vulgar attitude towards his interrogators prompts Daniels to tear up the Polaroid image, and then, along with Kima and Landsman, deliver a three-man beatdown. Largely because of Omar's testimony, Bird is convicted of murder and sentenced to life imprisonment without parole by Judge Phelan.

==== Little Man ====
- Played by: Micaiah Jones
- Appears in season one: "The Detail" (uncredited); "Lessons" (uncredited); "Game Day" (uncredited); "The Cost" (uncredited) and "The Hunt".

Wintell "Little Man" Royce was a heavyset soldier in the Barksdale crew, responsible for enforcing their regime at the Franklin Towers, mainly Tower 221. He is responsible for handing bags of cash to senator Clay Davis' aide Damien "Day Day" Price. With Wee-Bey Brice, he is involved in the shooting of "Orlando" and specifically shot Detective Greggs because he was surprised by her presence.

Stringer Bell decides that with the police cracking down on them because an officer was shot, they would be better off without the unreliable Little Man, and Wee-Bey kills him. The murder occurs offscreen, but Wee-Bey later tells police where to find Little Man's body as part of his confession.

==== Perry ====
- Played by: Perry Blackmon
- Appears in:

Season one: "Game Day" (uncredited)
Season two: "Ebb Tide" (uncredited)
Season three: "Time After Time" (uncredited); "Dead Soldiers" (uncredited); "Moral Midgetry" and "Mission Accomplished" (uncredited).

Perry was a soldier in the Barksdale organization, usually seen acting as security at the funeral home they use as a base of operations. He sometimes acts as bodyguard for Avon Barksdale. He is playing video games with Rico when Omar Little robs a Barksdale stash house he was supposed to be protecting. Perry is one of those arrested for weapons violations at the Barksdale safehouse.

==== Savino Bratton ====
Savino Bratton was a soldier in the Barksdale Organization. He is involved in setting up the shooting of Detective Greggs and Orlando and is sentenced to three years imprisonment. Savino is eventually killed in season five by Omar Little.

==== Anton "Stinkum" Artis ====
- Played by: Brandon Price
- Appears in:

Season one: "The Target" (uncredited); "The Detail"; "The Buys"; "Old Cases"; "The Pager"; "One Arrest" and "Lessons"

Anton "Stinkum" Artis was a lieutenant and enforcer in the Barksdale crew, responsible for making re-supplies from the crew's base at the Franklin Towers to their territory in the low-rise projects, known as "The Pit". He is robbed during a delivery by stick-up man Omar Little, later taking part in the brutal killing of Omar's accomplice and boyfriend Brandon in retribution. He unwittingly saves D'Angelo from a police setup, that Orlando Blocker was involved with as a side hustle, by advising him to check with his uncle. Stinkum is set to be a central piece of the Barksdale detail's case as their investigation progressed, amassing much evidence of him performing various illegal acts.

The police seizes the resupply from his subordinate Kevin Johnston, but allow Stinkum to go free to avoid arousing suspicion about their surveillance methods. After being promoted by Avon Barksdale to run new territory for the organization, Stinkum and Wee Bey prepare to make a move on the territory which is run by an independent corner boy. Whilst preparing to move in accordance with Bey's plan, he is gunned down by a shotgun blast, hitting his chest killing him instantly,the gunman is revealed to be stickup boy Omar as revenge for Brandon.

==== Roland "Wee-Bey" Brice ====
Wee-Bey was the Barksdale organization's most trusted soldier, before being arrested in season one for multiple homicides. He becomes a connection for the crew and its members while they go through the system for lesser crimes. His family uses his trusted status in the crew to its fullest advantage and after he is arrested they attempt to carry on with dealings on the street as usual, updating him on their periodic visits to speak at the prison.

=== Season two ===
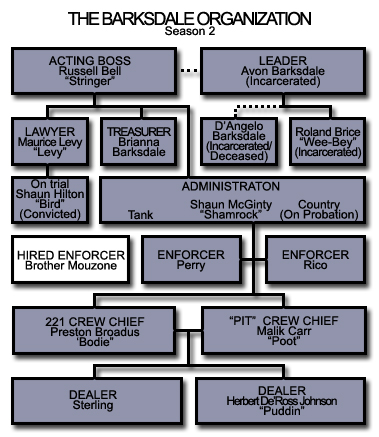
The Barksdale Organization (Season Two)

==== Country ====
- Played by: Addison Switzer
- Appears in:

Season two: "Ebb Tide" (uncredited) and "Hot Shots" (uncredited).
Season three: "Time After Time" (uncredited); "All Due Respect"; "Straight and True" and "Homecoming".

Country was a Barksdale soldier who returned to work for the organization when released from prison, despite being on parole. He is first seen trailing Bodie and Shamrock to Philadelphia, to make sure they follow Stringer Bell's orders. He also works with Shamrock to set up crooked prison guard Dwight Tilghman so that Avon Barksdale could inform on Tilghman to reduce his prison sentence.

During a later turf war between Barksdale and Marlo Stanfield, Country is one of Slim Charles' few voices of experience in a team of young soldiers until he is killed in an attempted drive-by on one of Marlo Stanfield's corners. The driver, Chipper, refuses to follow Slim's orders to wait for a signal before making a move. The car crashes with Gerard makes a quick escape, but Country is unable to get out in time and is gunned down by Stanfield corner boys.

==== Rico ====
- Played by: Rico Whelchel
- Appears in:

Season two: "Ebb Tide" (uncredited)
Season three: "Time After Time" (uncredited), "Dead Soldiers" (uncredited) and "Back Burners".

Rico was a soldier in the Barksdale organization, usually seen acting as security at the funeral home they use as a base of operations. He is playing video games with Perry when Omar Little robs a Barksdale stash house he was supposed to be keeping secure, and was involved in the subsequent shootout. He is then assigned to provide security for Poot Carr's corner because of the turf war with Marlo Stanfield. Rico is killed in a drive-by shooting by Stanfield soldier Snoop against Poot's corner.

==== Tank ====
- Played by: Jonathan D. Wray
- Appears in:

Season two: "Ebb Tide" (uncredited).
Season three: "Time After Time" (uncredited); "All Due Respect" (uncredited) and "Dead Soldiers".

Tank was a Barksdale organization soldier. He was first seen working with Country checking up on newly promoted crew chief Bodie Broadus as he made a trip to collect a new package of narcotics. Later, in the third season, Tank is shown to be guarding Barksdale stash houses. Tank is killed by Kimmy from Omar Little's crew during a shootout following an abortive heist of the stash house he was guarding.

=== Season three ===
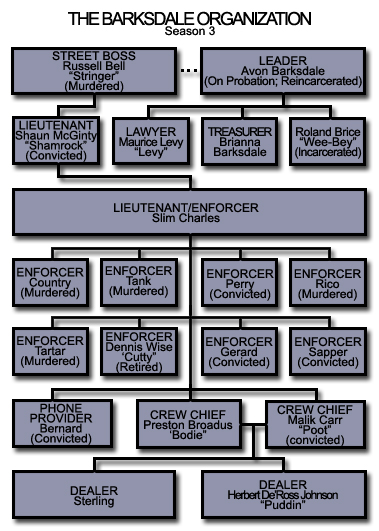
The Barksdale Organization (Season Three)

==== Bernard ====
- Played by: Melvin Jackson, Jr.
- Appears in:

Season three: "Back Burners"; "Moral Midgetry"; "Slapstick"; "Reformation" and "Mission Accomplished".

Bernard was a mule in the Barksdale organization given the task of buying their supply of disposable mobile phones used by the entire organization every two weeks in order to not be traced. "Shamrock" insists that Bernard buy no more than two phones at any one outlet (providing receipts to prove it) using rental cars to do so each time, per Stringer Bell's cautious instructions. Bernard's nagging girlfriend "Squeak", tires of the time spent repeatedly visiting dozens of stores while she accompanied him on these outings.

She puts Bernard in touch with an undercover Lester Freamon, who provides them with illegally re-charged phones at a lower price (and fake receipts), in actuality phones with pre-installed wiretaps. Information collected from these phones eventually brings down the Barksdale drug operations, including the arrest of Bernard and Squeak. Bernard says that he could not wait to go to jail to get away from Squeak, and does not seem to be entirely kidding.

==== Cutty ====
Cutty was a prisoner who became affiliated with the Barksdales when they needed muscle, recommended by his cellmate Wee-Bey. After Cutty's release from prison, he proves highly effective in the organization until he realizes that he is no longer willing to kill people, declaring "The game ain't in me no more". He leaves the organization on respectful terms from Avon, who later gives him money to start a boxing gym.

==== Devonne ====
- Played by: Tiara Harris
- Appears in:

Season three:"Moral Midgetry" and "Reformation"

Devonne is a young woman used by the Barksdale Organization as bait for Marlo Stanfield. She is first mentioned by Avon as a means to get close to Marlo Stanfield. She catches Marlo's attention in a club and he approaches her. Marlo checks that she is there with friends and declines both drinking and dancing. Instead they leave the club together. After they have sex in his car Devonne persuades him to meet her again the next day.

Marlo phones Devonne to arrange a meeting and begins to feel suspicious. He assigns Chris Partlow to investigate Devonne. Snoop sits in the restaurant Marlo arranged to meet Devonne at and notices a Barksdale soldier buying a large quantity of food and taking it to a nearby SUV. Snoop reports in to Partlow.

Partlow observes Devonne receiving a signal from the car and figures out it is a trap. Marlo and Chris Partlow set up a night time ambush for Devonne. When she emerges from her home, Marlo shoots her once in each breast, then a third time through her mouth. Partlow assures him that the murder was necessary.

She bears the distinction of being the only person that Marlo has personally murdered on-screen, as opposed to having Chris do it.

==== Gerard ====
- Played by: Leonard A. Anderson
- Appears in season three: "Dead Soldiers" (uncredited); "Hamsterdam"; "Straight and True"; "Homecoming"; "Moral Midgetry"; "Slapstick" and "Mission Accomplished".

Gerard was a dim Barksdale organization enforcer working under Slim Charles, though more intelligent than Sapper, who he usually works with. He is first seen guarding the front door during one of Omar Little's attempted heists. Later, Gerard, Sapper and Dennis "Cutty" Wise are charged with finding a thief in the Barksdale organization. Cutty's experience makes the task simple, and Gerard and Sapper punish the culprit with a savage beating. Gerard and Sapper are thrown out of Avon Barksdale's homecoming party when Barksdale saw them come in high.

Gerard receives more work as the organization becomes embroiled in a turf war with Marlo Stanfield. He is almost killed in an attempted drive by where both Chipper and Country are killed, when Chipper, the driver, impatiently sets off early. Gerard and Sapper are later involved in the attempted shooting of Omar's grandmother, in violation of the Sunday truce. They are ordered by Avon Barksdale to replace a hat that they damaged in this unsanctioned action. Gerard is arrested at a Barksdale safehouse for weapons violations.

==== Sapper ====
- Played by: Brandan T. Tate
- Appears in season three: "Dead Soldiers" (uncredited); "Hamsterdam"; "Straight and True"; "Moral Midgetry"; "Slapstick" and "Mission Accomplished".

Sapper is a young idiotic Barksdale organization enforcer working under Slim Charles. He often works with Gerard, and seems to be the dumber of the two. He is probably best remembered for enthusiastically uttering the line "like a forty-degree day!" as he misunderstands a speech from Stringer Bell. Sapper is first seen guarding the back door during an attempted heist by Omar Little. Gerard, Sapper and Dennis "Cutty" Wise were charged with finding a thief in the Barksdale organization.

Cutty's experience made the task simple and Gerard and Sapper punished the culprit with a savage beating. Gerard and Sapper were later thrown out of Avon Barksdale's homecoming party when Barksdale saw them come in high. Gerard and Sapper are later involved in the attempted shooting of Omar Little while Omar was with his grandmother after church, in violation of the Sunday truce. They are ordered by Avon Barksdale to replace a hat that they damaged in this unsanctioned action. Sapper is incarcerated at Avon's weapon stash house at the end of season 3.

== Drug dealers ==
=== D'Angelo Barksdale ===
D'Angelo Barksdale was Avon's nephew and a lieutenant in his drug dealing organization. He was mainly responsible for leading the corner boys in their street dealings and coordinating their earnings and performance. He was the main connection between the upper levels of the crew and the street kids that were selling the product. He struggles with the morality behind his trade and came close to informing on the crew because of it, only relenting because of loyalty to family ties his mother reminded him of before signing. He took the sentence and went to prison where he was killed by a hitman sent by Stringer Bell in season 2.

=== Ronnie Mo ===
- Played by: Jarvis W. George
- Appears in season one: "The Detail" (uncredited), "Cleaning Up" and "Sentencing".

"Ronnie Mo" Watkins ran the drug dealing operation in "The Pit" for the Barksdale organization before D'Angelo Barksdale. Ronnie Mo's promotion to overseeing Building 851 as a crew chief came just prior to the beginning of the series. Before the promotion, he worked with Bodie, Poot and Wallace in the low rises. Ronnie Mo is seen flirting with dancers at Avon's strip club. He is arrested by Herc, when the Barksdale investigation comes to an end, and is sentenced to fifteen years due to prior felonies.

=== Bodie Broadus ===
Bodie was a loyal drug dealer for the Barksdale organization who rose up in the ranks of the organization and was later left to run his own small independent crew after the organization fell apart. Eventually, he was forced to work for, and was subsequently killed by Marlo Stanfield's crew.

=== Poot ===
Poot is a loyal drug dealer for the Barksdale organization, who serves brief prison time for his crimes. By the end of the series he is working at a shoe store attempting to distance himself from the game after growing tired of it and reeling from the loss of many friends.

=== Sterling ===
- Played by: Curtis Montez
- Appears in season one: "The Buys" (uncredited), "The Pager" and "Sentencing".

Sterling is a drug dealer in the low rise projects (known as "the pit") under D'Angelo Barksdale. Sterling is in charge of the crew's stash of narcotics, giving vials of drugs to the runners when needed. When Omar Little robs the crew, Sterling refuses to tell him where the stash is hidden and Omar shoots him in the kneecap. When Stringer Bell asks D'Angelo to flush out leaks in his team, D'Angelo discovers that Sterling (along with Cass) is stealing from him. He lets them off with a warning and a demotion to lookouts. When Bodie Broadus takes over "The Pit", Sterling is involved in his efforts to drive off a rival crew and is seen wielding a baseball bat alongside Bodie and Poot.

=== Wallace ===
Wallace is a 16-year-old drug dealer in the Barksdale crew's low rise projects organization, who is looking after a number of younger children in the neighborhood. He tries to leave the drug trade over guilt for his role in the death of Brandon, Omar Little's boyfriend, and he informs on the Barksdale Organization for the police. He is subsequently murdered by his friends Poot Carr and Bodie Broadus on orders from Stringer Bell. D'Angelo Barksdale, who had befriended Wallace, grows outraged when he learns of the murder; it drives a permanent wedge between D'Angelo and Stringer, and is a main factor that leads D'Angelo to want to leave "the game" himself.

=== Puddin ===
- Played by: De'Rodd Hearns
- Appears in:

Season one: "The Hunt" (uncredited); "Sentencing" (uncredited)
Season two: "Ebb Tide"; "Stray Rounds" (uncredited); "Port in a Storm" and "Duck and Cover" (uncredited).
Season three: "Time After Time"; "All Due Respect"; "Dead Soldiers"; "Back Burners" and "Mission Accomplished" (uncredited).

Herbert De'Rodd "Puddin'" Johnson is a drug dealer in Bodie Broadus' crew in the 221 Tower building for the Barksdale organization. Puddin handles the count for Bodie and also spends time with him and Poot Carr when they are not working. In season two, Puddin is involved in a shoot out that results in the death of a nine-year-old boy. Puddin stays with Bodie after the towers are demolished.

Bodie is tasked with moving into Marlo Stanfield's territory, and his crew get into a turf war with a Stanfield crew led by Fruit. Puddin and his fellow dealers are severely beaten with baseball bats by Fruit, Jamal and a group of Stanfield soldiers as a warning to the Barksdale organization. Puddin is arrested along with Avon and many others in the organization at the end of season 3.

Puddin is played by De'Rodd Hearns who also works in the post production department and is the half brother of DeAndre McCullough. DeAndre plays Lamar on The Wire and was the basis of a character in David Simon's The Corner.

=== Kevin Johnston ===
- Played by: Jimmy Jelani Manners
- Appears in: "The Detail"; "One Arrest"

Kevin Johnston is a drug dealer in season one, he is first seen when Roland "Prez" Pryzbylewski, Herc, and Carver go to the 221 towers and cause a bust without backup and Prez pistol-whips Johnston, leaving him blind in one eye.

Kevin is later tailed by the police with Stinkum on their way to the low rise pit to drop four G packs of dope for D'Angelo's crew, Kevin jumps out of the car with the bag of drugs and is chased by the police at the pit and is arrested. He comes face to face with Prez again, making him nervous. He is treated sympathetically by Lieutenant Daniels who was disgusted at his assault by Prez, but covered for Prez due to him being related to a High ranking Officer he attempt to get Kevin to become an informant against the Barksdale drug empire. Kevin refuses to say anything, comparing the proposition to being pimped by the police. He is not seen again and presumed to being in jail on drug charges.

== Legal representation ==
=== Maurice Levy ===
Levy was the Barksdale organization's lawyer.

== Front workers ==
=== Wendell "Orlando" Blocker ===
- Played by: Clayton LeBouef
- Appears in season one: "The Target"; "The Pager"; "One Arrest"; "Lessons"; "Game Day"; "The Cost" and "The Hunt".

Orlando acted as a front operator for the Barksdale crew and ran their strip club, Orlando's. Orlando had ambitions to get involved with the drug dealing aspect of the organization, but his superiors needed him to keep a clean record for the club's licensing. He approached D'Angelo Barksdale to try to involve him in cocaine dealing but D'Angelo refused and eventually told his uncle, Avon. Avon punished Orlando with a humiliating beating.

Orlando was later arrested when he tried to buy drugs from an undercover Maryland State Police officer and agreed to inform on Barksdale for the police. While imprisoned for the charge he was spotted by a Barksdale affiliate inmate who phoned in Orlando's whereabouts. He was visited by Barksdale organization lawyer Maurice Levy, who was there to take his name off the club's license rather than offer help. Orlando was killed by Barksdale soldiers Wee-Bey Brice and Little Man in a botched sting operation which also resulted in the shooting of detective Kima Greggs.

=== Shardene Innes ===
- Played by: Wendy Grantham
- Appears in:

Season 1: "The Target"; "The Buys"; "The Pager"; "The Wire"; "Lessons"; "Game Day"; "The Cost"; "Cleaning Up"; "Sentencing".
Season 2: "All Prologue".
Season 5: "–30–"

Shardene was a dancer at Orlando's, who deliberately ignored the illegal activity in the club because she wanted to make quick money. Her first meeting with D'Angelo Barksdale did not go well, but she later agreed to go out with him. Shardene and D'Angelo moved in together after seeing each other for a few months, and it was going well until Detectives Freamon and Greggs showed her the body of Keesha, another dancer from the club.

D'Angelo had told her the girl was taken to a hospital following an overdose at a party. In reality, she had (unbeknownst to him) been left to die, wrapped in a carpet, and dumped by Wee-Bey Brice. She felt betrayed by D'Angelo and agreed to try to help the police however she safely could.

Shardene moved out of D'Angelo's place soon after this. Kima and Freamon wired her with a microphone, and she attempted to get close to Barksdale's conversations with little success. Frightened, Shardene begged to be allowed to stop, but Freamon persuaded her to help them determine the floorplan of the club so they could install a hidden camera in Avon Barksdale's office, which ultimately led them to catch Avon incriminating himself on video.

Freamon and Shardene grew close during the investigation, and by season 2 they were sharing an apartment. Although she was no longer a stripper (having been encouraged by Freamon to enroll in nursing school), she was able to help put the detectives in touch with some dancers when they were investigating the deaths of girls involved in the sex trade. In Season 5, in the series' penultimate episode, Freamon hopes Shardene is awake because he is "in the mood for love" as he prepares to return home after a celebratory drinking session with Bunk. Shardene appeared in the series finale with Lester as they celebrate with other policemen the "death" of Freamon and McNulty's careers as police. She was seen kissing Freamon during the series finale ending montage.

== Family ==
=== Donette ===
Donette, played by Shamyl Brown, is the mother of D'Angelo's child.

- Played by: Shamyl Brown
- Appears in:

Season one: "The Detail"; "The Pager" and "The Cost".
Season two: "Hot Shots"; "Undertow"; and "Backwash"
Season three: "All Due Respect"; "Dead Soldiers"; "Hamsterdam"; "Homecoming"; "Back Burners" and "Mission Accomplished".

Donette is drug lieutenant D'Angelo Barksdale's girlfriend in season 1 and is the mother of his son. Shortly after his acquittal, D'Angelo brings her to a party organized by Avon, where she first meets Stringer Bell. She often worries over her financial situation and nags D'Angelo for money. At one point, D'Angelo takes her to dinner at an upscale restaurant, and D'Angelo tries to explain his doubts about his lifestyle to her, but Donette dismisses his worries. D'Angelo begins seeing Shardene Innes behind Donette's back during the course of the season.

After D'Angelo is arrested, Avon gives Donette an allowance as support money. Donette then gets involved with Stringer Bell while D'Angelo is in prison. She visits D'Angelo at Stringer's behest to try to ease the experience of prison for him. Stringer has mounting concerns that D'Angelo is going to reveal to the authorities information about the Barksdale organization's drug dealing, covertly orders him killed, and has the death staged to look like a suicide.

In season 3, Jimmy McNulty reinvestigates D'Angelo's death and figures out what really happened. When he tries to use this information to coerce Donette into cooperating, she refuses to talk to him. She passes the information about McNulty's visit on to D'Angelo's mother Brianna.

Donette is shown in the montage at the end of season 3 weeping on her couch, having lost both D'Angelo and now Stringer Bell to the drug trade. This is Donette's last appearance in the series; the Barksdale organization is of only peripheral importance once Avon is imprisoned and Stringer is dead. ("Mission Accomplished").

=== Brianna Barksdale ===
Brianna Barksdale, a criminal matriarch played by Michael Hyatt

- Played by: Michael Hyatt
- Appears in:

Season one: "Cleaning Up" and "Sentencing".
Season two: "Collateral Damage"; "All Prologue"; "Backwash" and "Stray Rounds".
Season three: "Straight and True"; "Homecoming"; "Moral Midgetry"; "Slapstick"; and "Mission Accomplished".
Season four: "Margin of Error".

Brianna Barksdale is D'Angelo's mother and Avon's sister. Brianna grew up in West Baltimore, and her family has always been involved in the drug trade. With her brother Avon controlling narcotics on the West Side, Brianna acts as an advisor, helps to manage their profits, and receives a healthy income, nice home, and new car for her efforts.

She raised her son to manage the tough streets and got him working in the family business as soon as he was old enough. D'Angelo was quickly made a lieutenant in Avon's operation despite some misgivings.

She first appears bringing food to D'Angelo at work. Later, she is fiercely protective of her son when he is arrested for drug trafficking, insisting that Avon was wrong for sending him to pick up narcotics. Her brother promises to do everything he can to help D'Angelo.

When D'Angelo is ready to turn against his family, Brianna visits him and changes his mind, convincing him to accept a lengthy prison sentence to protect Avon. When D'Angelo once more begins to withdraw from his family in prison, Brianna visits him to try to talk him around. This time, D'Angelo insists that he doesn't want to see her again.

When D'Angelo is killed on Stringer's orders and his death staged to look like a suicide, Brianna is distraught. She is comforted by Stringer, oblivious to his complicity in D'Angelo's death. Brianna argues with Avon to allow Stringer to manage their business his way while Avon is imprisoned.

When Avon is released, she continues to advise both men. Jimmy McNulty, doing off-the-books work into D'Angelo's murder, tells Donette about his suspicions. Donette passes the information on to Brianna. Brianna, suspicious, meets with McNulty and is convinced by the evidence, not the least when he rips into her over how she convinced D'Angelo to accept the harsh prison sentence in the first place.

She confronts Avon and Stringer about McNulty's allegations and asks Avon, indirectly at first, if he ordered D'Angelo's killing. He truthfully denies any involvement (although Stringer has, by this point, admitted to Avon that he ordered the murder). Brianna is not convinced and begins to hold Avon responsible for D'Angelo's death.

Brianna is left at the helm of what remains of the Barksdale empire when Avon is arrested and Stringer is killed. She is responsible for distributing their funds to family members of incarcerated crew members. For example, she pays De'Londa Brice to raise Wee-Bey's son, Namond. She eventually decides to cut off the families, stating that she has no further income and no need to protect Avon because of the rift in their relationship. She calls Namond and De'Londa to her home to give them the news and tries to ensure that Namond knows his mother has received more than enough to live on already. Brianna is not seen in season 5, but is mentioned as the recipient of a large cash sum from Marlo Stanfield as part of a deal with Avon to let Marlo directly contact the Greeks.

=== De'Londa Brice ===
De'Londa Brice played by Sandi McCree

- Played by: Sandi McCree
- Appears in season four: "Soft Eyes"; "Home Rooms" (uncredited); "Alliances"; "Margin of Error"; "Misgivings;" "A New Day;" "That's Got His Own"; "Final Grades".

De'Londa is the mother of Namond Brice. Namond's father Wee-Bey Brice is incarcerated for multiple homicides. Although De'Londa has adopted Wee-Bey's last name, they are not married.

De'Londa raises her son using funds from the criminal organization Wee-Bey worked for, and she holds Wee-Bey in high regard as a male role model for Namond. She actively encourages Namond to get involved in Baltimore's drug trade and uses Wee-Bey's contacts to get him work.

De'Londa owns her own home and spends a relatively large amount on clothes, jewelry and shoppoing in New York compared to her neighbors. She ensures that Namond always wears expensive clothes even when he has misbehaved. De'Londa enjoys regular shopping trips to New York City and visits to Atlantic City while leaving Namond to care for himself.

When Brianna Barksdale cuts De'Londa off from the Barksdale empire, De'Londa is left fuming. She attempts to blackmail and threaten her but Brianna is unfazed by them. She complains to Bey who cannot do anything as violating his proffer agreement, could put him on deathrow. She decides the only way to support her way of life is to have her son work as a crew chief. She bosses one-time Barksdale lieutenant Bodie Broadus into giving Namond a package of his own and instructs Namond on how best to sell it but will not let him drop out of school for his new work. She encourages her son to use violence even against Kernard who stole his package.

After De'Londa's confrontation with her son resulting in his running away, Wee-Bey, on the advice of Howard "Bunny" Colvin, insists that she let the boy go to follow his own path. De'Londa relents and the season's final episode concludes with Namond's having been unofficially adopted by the Colvin family.
