= The Detail (The Wire) =

- The Wire episode
- Episode no.: Season 1 Episode 2
- Directed by: Clark Johnson
- Story by: David Simon; Ed Burns
- Teleplay by: David Simon
- Original air date: June 9, 2002
- Running time: 58 minutes

Episode chronology
← Previous "The Target"	Next → "The Buys"
- The Wire season 1

"The Detail" is the second episode of the first season of the American crime drama The Wire. The episode was written by David Simon from a story by David Simon and Ed Burns and was directed by Clark Johnson. It debuted on June 9, 2002, on HBO in the U.S. The story focuses on the Baltimore police investigating the murder of a witness who testified against the Barksdale gang and recruiting Bubbles as an informant.

On its premiere, "The Detail" had nearly 2.8 million viewers. The episode received positive reviews, especially regarding two scenes that commented on the Chicken McNugget and U.S. drug policy.

== Plot ==
McNulty and Bunk investigate William Gant's murder. McNulty believes the Barksdale Organization had Gant killed as a show of force towards potential witnesses; Bunk is skeptical that anybody would kill a witness after they had already testified. McNulty visits Judge Phelan, who pressures Deputy Commissioner Burrell to have Lieutenant Daniels allow McNulty on the case. Mollified, Phelan agrees not to call the media about the Gant murder.

Daniels and his detail arrive at their new office – a damp basement with little furniture. The rest of the detail is introduced, but Daniels dismisses them all as useless "humps", especially after Officer Roland "Prez" Pryzbylewski accidentally discharges his weapon indoors. When Daniels visits Assistant State's Attorney Rhonda Pearlman to complain, she tells him that Prez was nearly indicted for shooting his own patrol car. Daniels confides that he feels Burrell sent him a message by not allowing him to pick his own detail. He meets with Lieutenant Cantrell and convinces him to assign Detective Leander Sydnor (Cantrell's best man) to counterbalance Prez (his worst).

Carver, Greggs and Herc photograph Bubbles from a rooftop as he marks Barksdale dealers by pretending to sell them red hats. When Greggs brings Bubbles in to identify the dealers, McNulty is surprised by the scale of the Barksdale Organization. McNulty and Bunk visit D'Angelo in the Pit to press him on the Gant murder. When D'Angelo refuses to cooperate, they arrest him without a charge. Under interrogation, they play upon D'Angelo's conscience; he is manipulated into writing a letter of condolence to Gant's family. Barksdale attorney Maurice Levy arrives and stops D'Angelo from further self-incrimination.

Greggs and McNulty show the letter to Daniels, who is skeptical about its usefulness in building a case. Now free, D'Angelo takes his girlfriend, Donette, and their infant son to a family party, where Avon rebukes him for the letter. While drinking late at night, Herc, Carver and Prez decide to intimidate the Barksdales. Prez pistol-whips a teenager, Kevin Johnston, for leaning on his car and mouthing off. Gunfire rains down from the high-rise projects, and Herc is hit. The next day, Daniels berates the three and asks who hit Johnston. Prez confesses, and Daniels instructs him to lie that he feared for his safety.

Bunk informs McNulty that the Gant murder has made the front page, likely from a leak by Phelan. Alone, McNulty drinks heavily and is too inebriated to stop a nearby car theft. Daniels dines with his wife Marla, a local politician, who admonishes him for covering up police brutality. She counsels him to withdraw from the politically charged case. Daniels is later awakened with news that Johnston has permanently lost the use of one eye.

== Production ==
=== Epigraph ===
You cannot lose if you do not play. - Marla Daniels

This line is spoken in a conversation with Marla's husband Cedric about his impossible position of running the Barksdale investigation while trying to further his career.

=== Credits ===
==== Guest stars ====
- Ty Warren as Bottle Thrower
- Peter Gerety as Judge Daniel Phelan
- Seth Gilliam as Detective Ellis Carver
- Domenick Lombardozzi as Detective Thomas "Herc" Hauk
- Clarke Peters as Detective Lester Freamon
- Jim True-Frost as Detective Roland "Prez" Pryzbylewski
- Maria Broom as Marla Daniels
- J. D. Williams as Preston "Bodie" Broadus
- Hassan Johnson as Roland "Wee-Bey" Brice
- Michael B. Jordan as Wallace
- Corey Parker-Robinson as Detective Leander Sydnor
- Tom Quinn as Detective Patrick Mahon
- Michael Salconi as Detective Michael Santangelo
- Delaney Williams as Sergeant Jay Landsman
- Richard De Angelis as Major Raymond Foerster
- Nat Benchley as Detective Augustus Polk
- Shamyl Brown as Donette
- Tray Chaney as Malik "Poot" Carr
- Erik Todd Dellums as Dr. Randall Frazier
- Michael Kostroff as Maurice Levy
- Brandon Price as Anton "Stinkum" Artis
- Dave Trovato as Lieutenant Cantrell

== Broadcast ==
"The Detail" premiered June 9, 2002, on HBO in the U.S. In the UK, this episode had its broadcast TV debut on March 31, 2009, on BBC Two.

== Reception ==
=== Ratings ===
On its HBO debut, "The Detail" had an estimated 2.799 million viewers with a 1.8 share, ranking fifth in Nielsen Media Research's U.S. premium cable TV programming for the week ending June 9, 2002. In the UK, the episode had nearly 500,000 viewers when it premiered on BBC Two in 2009.

=== Critical reception ===
In a 2002 review rating the first few episodes of season one 3.5 out of four stars, Charlie McCollum of the San Jose Mercury News commented: "By the end of the second episode, you're almost hoping for the return of Luther Mahoney, the flamboyant criminal mastermind from 'Homicide.'"

One scene where Poot, Wallace, and D'Angelo argue about whether the creator of the Chicken McNugget was wealthy has been regarded as one of the most memorable moments of the show by critics, including Heather Havrilesky of Salon.com. Havrilesky wrote in 2006: "The dialogue may seem like a digression, until you recognize the brutal logic of the Barksdale drug empire." Alan Sepinwall, in a 2008 retrospective of this episode, commented on this scene: "The way it is, D explains, the McNugget inventor is just some anonymous grunt who found a way to make more money for his corporate overlords." For The Guardian, Paul Owen commented about that scene in 2009 that D'Angelo and Wallace demonstrate intellect and added: "...the show is keen to prove that its project characters are people, not stereotypes."

Sepinwall also noted the scene of McNulty and Bunk interrogating D'Angelo for its commentary on American drug policy, for depicting police as "wast[ing] far too many resources policing low-level dealers and users" and the dealers as committing violence "in a way that the cops just can't ignore." Similarly, regarding a scene of a drug dealer commenting, "Everything else gets sold...without people getting shot", Ben Marshall of The Guardian commented in 2005 about the episode's message: "In the drugs trade the customer is never right, but some customers are more wrong than others."
