= Dead Soldiers =

- The Wire episode
- Episode no.: Season 3 Episode 3
- Directed by: Rob Bailey
- Story by: David Simon; Dennis Lehane
- Teleplay by: Dennis Lehane
- Original air date: October 3, 2004
- Running time: 58 minutes

Episode chronology
← Previous "All Due Respect"	Next → "Hamsterdam"
- The Wire season 3

"Dead Soldiers" is the 28th episode of the American crime drama The Wire, the third episode of the third season. The episode was written by Dennis Lehane from a story by David Simon & Dennis Lehane and was directed by Rob Bailey. It originally aired on October 3, 2004, on HBO in the U.S. In the episode, the Baltimore police department clashes with the mayor's office over the city murder rate, while Omar Little's crew engages in a gunfight with the Barksdale Organization.

On its premiere, the episode had nearly 1.5 million viewers, ranking second in Nielsen Media Research's weekly U.S. premium cable ratings. Critics for The Guardian and TV Guide noted the episode's exploration of drug crime.

== Synopsis ==
At the weekly ComStat meeting, Burrell demotes Major Marvin Taylor for failing to bring down crime figures in his district. Carcetti submits to an interview in which he blames high crime rates on Mayor Clarence Royce's failure to fund police training. Burrell is outraged that Carcetti has gone to the press, and is forced by the mayor to take the hit over the story. Watkins urges Royce to fire Burrell, but the mayor decides to continue backing the acting commissioner as a reward for his political loyalty. After attending a fundraiser with his wife and children, Carcetti has sex with a woman he noticed in the crowd.

As Omar's crew scope out a Barksdale stash house, Kimmy questions Omar's vendetta against the Barksdale Organization. Their robbery the next day goes awry when the Barksdales open fire on the crew, causing Dante to accidentally kill Tosha. Kimmy shoots Tank before the crew escapes. Bell is called to meet Proposition Joe, who says that the Major Case Unit tipped their hand by bringing in Cheese and telling him about the wiretap. Stringer orders his enforcers to cover Tosha's funeral and wake in case Omar shows up. Omar takes responsibility for Tosha's death and stands outside during Tosha's memorial services.

McNulty goes to Bunk for his opinion on D'Angelo's death. Bunk has been tasked with recovering Dozerman's stolen weapon, and accompanies Holley to go to the scene of the botched robbery. There, he notices Kenard nearby pretending to be Omar and acting out the shooting with a group of other children. Daniels convenes a meeting to discuss shifting the MCU's focus from Bell and Joe to a new target, to Greggs' vocal displeasure. McNulty is angered by both the unit's change in direction and Pearlman's new relationship with Daniels. McNulty and Greggs cruise the Western to see what has changed since the towers fell instead of focusing on Daniels' target. While observing Fruit's crew the next day, McNulty learns that Ray Cole has died while exercising at the gym. He and the other detectives go to the bar to attend Cole's cop wake, where Landsman delivers the eulogy.

Colvin and a reluctant Mello survey quiet territory in their district to push drug activity into. Colvin orders his men to stop reclassifying crimes and give the statistics straight. At the next ComStat meeting, Burrell and Rawls berate Colvin for a minuscule rise in his district's figures, and threaten to remove him from his post if they do not improve. As the commanders discuss their plans to meet Rawls' demands, Colvin says that he is considering legalizing drugs; the other commanders laugh, assuming that Colvin is joking. Later, Colvin informs his men that he plans to move drug trade into three specific areas. McNulty and Greggs track down Bubbles and Johnny to offer them work. Bubbles takes the offer, saying that he is always willing to go for easy money. Marlo orders Fruit to help him invade Barksdale territory, leading Fruit and his team to assault Bodie's crew. Cutty tracks down his former girlfriend Grace Sampson, who is now a middle school teacher. Grace seems impressed that Cutty is out of the game, but gently rebuffs his attempt to rekindle their past relationship.

=== First appearances ===
- Gerard and Sapper: Young and idiotic Barksdale enforcers involved in the gunfight following Omar Little's heist attempt.
- Jen Carcetti: Tommy Carcetti's loyal wife.
- Jeff Price: A city council reporter for the city desk at The Baltimore Sun. The character would not be seen again until Season 5, which focuses heavily on the Sun and its staff.
- Grace Sampson: A school teacher and Cutty's old flame.

== Production ==
=== Epigraph ===
The gods will not save you.

— Burrell

=== Writing ===
One of several crime novelists recruited to write third season episodes, Dennis Lehane made his writing debut for The Wire in this episode. Interviewed by Caryn James of The New York Times, Lehane described his process of writing dialogue for character Stringer Bell: "Stringer's from the streets but he's trying to be beyond that, so you have a man who speaks very precisely, but at times the street slips out."

== Reception ==
On its premiere, "Dead Soldiers" had an estimated 1.54 million viewers, ranking second in Nielsen Media Research's weekly U.S. premium cable ratings.

TV Guide critic Matt Roush quoted Prop Joe suggesting that "boredom" is more dangerous for police than gun violence or liquor as an example of The Wire being "a complex urban tragedy".

Mark Smith of The Guardian found the episode title to "illuminate the amoral futility of the city's drugs policing" from perspectives of both the police and drug dealers. In a 2010 review, Alan Sepinwall of HitFix observed that conflicts in this episode stemmed from "characters who view themselves as guardians of a dysfunctional status quo brushing up against those who want to challenge or change it."
