= Charley Scalies =

American actor (1940–2025)

- Born: July 19, 1940; Philadelphia, Pennsylvania, U.S.
- Died: May 1, 2025 (aged 84); Phoenixville, Pennsylvania, U.S.
- Occupation: Actor

Charles Joseph Scalies Jr. (July 19, 1940 – May 1, 2025) was an American actor best known for his portrayal of Thomas "Horseface" Pakusa, one of the stevedores and union members on the second season of HBO's The Wire. He also appeared in season five of The Sopranos as Coach Molinaro. Scalies appeared on other shows including Homicide: Life on the Street and Law & Order.

== Background ==
Scalies was born on July 19, 1940, to Charles and Theresa Scalies (née Iacona) in Philadelphia. He lived with his wife in Pennsylvania. He was the father of five children and the grandfather of four. Scalies died in Phoenixville on May 1, 2025, at the age of 84.

== Filmography ==
=== Film ===
Year	Title	Role	Notes
1995	Condition Red	Angel's Bodyguard	
1995	Two Bits	Ballyhoo Driver	
1995	12 Monkeys	Impatient Traveler	
1999	Liberty Heights	Louie	
2000	The Doghouse	Jay	
2004	Jersey Girl	Townie	Uncredited

=== Television ===
Year	Title	Role	Notes
1996	Homicide: Life on the Street	Sgt. Sal Burns	2 episodes
1997	Law & Order	Mario	Episode: "Ritual"
2003	The Wire	Thomas 'Horseface' Pakusa	12 episodes
2004	The Sopranos	Coach Molinaro	Episode: "The Test Dream"
2006, 2008	Law & Order: SVU	Dock Foreman / Bert Ferrara	2 episodes
2008	Cold Case	Rusty Jenkins	Episode: "Glory Days"
