= Richard Burton (Baltimore) =

American actor

- Occupation(s): Rapper, television actor

Richard Burton is a Baltimore, Maryland, city council employee and runs the "Believe" campaign. He was a rapper before becoming involved in Martin O'Malley's first Mayoral campaign after meeting him in 1998.

When O'Malley became mayor, Burton was involved in his Believe campaign and became the campaign's director in 2002. The Believe campaign aims to reduce drug trafficking, drug violence and drug use in Baltimore.

Burton has also appeared as a recurring character, Sean "Shamrock" McGinty, on the HBO crime drama series set in Baltimore, The Wire.
