= Wee-Bey Brice =

Character from The Wire

Roland Brice
- The Wire character
- Hassan Johnson as Wee-Bey Brice
- First appearance: "The Target" (2002)
- Last appearance: "–30–" (2008)
- Created by: David Simon
- Portrayed by: Hassan Johnson

In-universe information
- Alias: Wee-Bey
- Gender: Male
- Occupation: Gang enforcer
- Spouse: De'Londa Brice
- Children: Namond Brice

Roland "Wee-Bey" Brice is a fictional character in the HBO drama The Wire played by Hassan Johnson. Wee-Bey is a trusted soldier and third-in-command of the Barksdale Organization.

== Character storyline ==
Wee-Bey dropped out of school in sixth grade and started dealing drugs on a corner with Avon Barksdale and Stringer Bell to become the primary soldier in their criminal organization. Wee-Bey was also responsible for more mundane activities including driving and picking up money. He and De'Londa have a son, Namond.

He has no hesitation about sleeping with other women and maintains a separate residence. De'Londa uses his last name although they are not married. He has a passion for keeping tropical fish. Wee-Bey has the distinction of being one of the characters to appear in every season.

=== Season one ===
Wee-Bey is Barksdale's main soldier. When Avon is cleaning up any possible trail of evidence leading back to him, Wee-Bey kills a witness who had previously been bought off. Wee-Bey gets involved in two different gun fights with legendary stick-up man Omar Little, after torturing and killing Omar's partner, accomplice and lover Brandon. He also hunts down accomplice John Bailey who stole from their stash house.

Their first encounter ends with Wee-Bey shot in the leg, Stinkum is killed in the same incident, by Omar as they were preparing to move on an independent territory. Avon enraged by Omar's desruption orders his crew to make hunting Omar a priority. He later defends Avon against Omar, shooting him in the shoulder and forcing him to retreat. Wee-Bey has the distinction of being the only character in the Wire to get the better of Omar in a one-to-one gunfight.

Wee-Bey was also linked to the body of a dancer from Orlando's strip club, a Barksdale front company. While he did not kill her, he took no action to prevent her death from overdose after raping her at a party. Disgusted with his callous disposal of her body, Shardene gives information to Lester Freamon.

His downfall comes when he and Little Man kill Orlando, who was working as a police informant. During the killing, Little Man shoots and critically wounds the undercover Kima Greggs, in the car with Orlando. Wee-Bey is stunned to learn that the second shooting victim was an undercover cop. Stringer orders Wee-Bey to kill Little Man, stating that he is unreliable as a soldier, and flee town. D'Angelo Barksdale is responsible for driving Wee-Bey to Philadelphia (and taking care of his fish).

When D'Angelo is arrested soon after, he gives the police information concerning Wee-Bey's whereabouts and his murder of Deirdre Kresson, a former girlfriend of Avon's. Later, through a combination of the active wiretap and phone records, the police determine Wee-Bey's location. To apprehend Wee-Bey unarmed, they lure him out of the house by having Carver break the windows on his car. Once in custody, and guaranteed a life sentence for his involvement in Kima's shooting, Wee-Bey confesses to other murders, including several he did not commit, to protect those in the Barksdale Organization.

=== Season two ===
Wee-Bey is imprisoned with Avon, serving life without parole. He keeps artificial fish in his cell and enjoys a relatively easy life under Barksdale's protection. A correctional officer named Dwight Tilghman harasses him because he confessed to murdering a relative of Tilghman's.

Wee-Bey complains to Avon. Avon and Stringer resolve the problem by arranging for Tilghman to smuggle tainted drugs into the prison. When the bad drugs kill several inmates, Avon comes forward as an "informant" and implicates Tilghman as the culprit.

=== Season three ===
Dennis "Cutty" Wise is offered a position after Wee-Bey introduces him to Avon. Though it is short lived, Wee-Bey and Cutty still keep in touch after the latter leaves prison. When Brianna Barksdale cuts De'Londa off from the Barksdale empire, De'Londa is left fuming. She complains to Bey in an attempt to get him to cooperate as leverage. But he cannot do anything as violating his agreement, could end with him on deathrow.

=== Season four ===
Wee-Bey's teenage son, Namond Brice, becomes involved in the drug trade with Bodie Broadus. Namond is responsible for Wee-Bey's fish. De'Londa and Namond regularly visit Wee-Bey, who gives Namond advice on life, especially about surviving on the streets. When Brianna Barksdale cuts off the monthly payments that the Barksdale organization was making to the Brices, Namond is pressured into dealing by his mother.

Howard "Bunny" Colvin takes a liking to Namond after dealing with him in the special program for troubled youth that Colvin is supervising. Seeing potential in the boy, Colvin approaches Wee-Bey and asks permission to take Namond into his home. Colvin tells Wee-Bey that the changing face of the drug trade and Namond's capabilities in other areas make him better suited to a life off the streets.

Though initially reluctant, Wee-Bey agrees that Colvin's offer gives Namond the best chance of escaping the drug trade and making something of himself. Acknowledging that anything is preferable to a life as a soldier, Wee-Bey orders De'Londa to allow Colvin to assume guardianship of Namond, implicitly threatening her when she appears reluctant to let Namond go.

=== Season five ===
Wee-Bey is briefly seen during the end-of-season montage conversing amicably with Chris Partlow in the courtyard of the Maryland State prison; they are in a similar situation, both having been primary enforcers for West Baltimore kingpins, and now both serving life sentences for committing (and taking sole responsibility for) murders at the behest of their respective bosses.

== Real life origins ==
Ed Burns investigated several high-end drug traffickers in the 1980s. One of these was a heroin dealer named Thomas H. Taylor, whose partner, Vernon Collins, was known as Bey-Brother. He was described by one FBI informant as a "narcotics hit man who is feared throughout the narcotics underworld in Baltimore."

Collins is mentioned in David Simon's book Homicide: A Year on the Killing Streets as one of Baltimore's notorious contract killers in the late 1970s, along with Dennis Wise, who spawned a character of the same name played by actor Chad L. Coleman. Wee-Bey is a reference to this hit man and drug trafficker. Collins was arrested in 1987 and sentenced to thirty-five years in prison.

== Internet popularity ==
The scene from the season 1 episode "The Hunt" where Wee-Bey shows a surprised expression after learning that shooting victim Greggs was a police officer resurfaced as a reaction GIF over 15 years after this episode was originally aired.

Johnson commented about the popularity of that GIF in 2022: "It doesn't get old. I guess I have an out-of-body experience to be able to see that and understand that."
