= Storm Warnings =

- The Wire episode
- Episode no.: Season 2 Episode 10
- Directed by: Rob Bailey
- Story by: David Simon; Ed Burns
- Teleplay by: Ed Burns
- Original air date: August 10, 2003
- Running time: 58 minutes

Episode chronology
← Previous "Stray Rounds"	Next → "Bad Dreams"
- The Wire season 2

"Storm Warnings" is the tenth episode of the second season of the HBO original series The Wire. The episode was written by Ed Burns from a story by David Simon & Ed Burns and was directed by Rob Bailey. It originally aired on August 10, 2003. With nearly 3.5 million viewers, it was the second most popular program of the week on U.S. premium cable.

== Plot ==
Frank causes tensions in the stevedores union when he plans to run again for treasurer, despite an earlier agreement to let Ott take the position next. Ziggy and Johnny Fifty steal several cars from the docks, with plans to fence them to Glekas. When Ziggy meets with Glekas to receive his payment, Glekas offers less than agreed upon. The two argue, and Glekas throws Ziggy out, but Ziggy returns with a gun and shoots Glekas and an employee. Ziggy breaks down at the scene as the police arrive. He is questioned by Landsman and signs a confession with little hesitation. When Aimee questions Nick about the sums of cash she has found hidden in his room, he tells her he is being paid off the books by the person who runs the warehouse he claims to work for. When they learn about Ziggy's shooting, Nick and Frank trade recriminations.

Valchek, annoyed that the detail has shifted focus away from Frank, calls in the FBI to take over the case. He hands them all the detail's information and requests their help in recovering his surveillance van. The Bureau agrees to share the case with Daniels and Pearlman on the condition that they focus attention on the union. Bunk accompanies McNulty on a fishing trip to disguise their surveillance. On the home front, Greggs is cold toward a now-pregnant Cheryl. Back at the detail, Greggs questions Beadie about balancing her police duties with being a mother. After the FBI agents offer to help trace the contraband containers' origins, Valchek arrives at the detail and lays into Daniels for failing to deliver a case on Frank. He insists Prez leave the detail, but Prez refuses to go and punches Valchek when he insults him. After an outraged Valchek leaves, Prez turns in his gun and submits himself to Daniels for a reprimand.

Koutris becomes aware of the FBI's investigation and divulges their tracking methods to The Greek. Vondas arranges for Eton to organize a meeting while insisting that phones be avoided. When Eton informs Vondas about Glekas' murder, he orders the warehouse to be cleaned out. Bunk and McNulty observe from a boat as Vondas and Eton discard their phones. Herc and Carver watch as Nick tries fruitlessly to see Vondas at The Greek's cafe. McNulty is disappointed when Fitz tells him that tracing text messages is impossible without knowing the service provider and the call's time and location. Fitz and Bunk trace a call using FBI technology and subpoena the billing information from the service provider. Bunk talks the phone company clerk into allowing them a peek at the records, and is dismayed to see messages are written in Greek. The detectives learn that Vondas has ordered the operation shut down. McNulty types warrants as Eton and Serge destroy evidence.

The Barksdales see their trade improve after they begin their collaboration with Proposition Joe. Stringer gives Cheese control of three of the six Barksdale towers. Bodie quickly adapts to the new circumstances and becomes friendly competitors with Cheese. However, Brother Mouzone shows up and tells Cheese to leave if he doesn't work for Avon. After Cheese insults Mouzone, the hitman shoots him in the arm with a round of snake shot. Cheese is sufficiently intimidated and leaves. Joe knows of Mouzone's reputation and decides not to retaliate directly. Instead, he visits Butchie and convinces him to broker a meeting between Stringer and Omar. At the towers, Bodie and other dealers observe Mouzone and are impressed by his notoriety.

== Production ==
=== Epigraph ===
It pays to go with the union card every time.

— Ziggy

Ziggy makes this comment as a joke to his (union) accomplice as they steal cars from the docks.

=== Music ===
The montage that opens the episode is accompanied by the Johnny Cash song "I Walk the Line". While the song technically has a source within the universe of the story, with Detective Pryzbylewski playing it from a CD and ending the montage by pressing pause, this scene still noticeably stands out among the rest of the show which usually makes a point of not including non-diegetic music (with few exceptions).

=== Credits ===
==== Starring cast ====
Although credited, John Doman, and Wood Harris do not appear in this episode.

==== Guest stars ====
1. Seth Gilliam as Detective Ellis Carver
2. Domenick Lombardozzi as Detective Thomas "Herc" Hauk
3. Jim True-Frost as Detective Roland "Prez" Pryzbylewski
4. James Ransone as Ziggy Sobotka
5. Pablo Schreiber as Nick Sobotka
6. Method Man as Melvin "Cheese" Wagstaff
7. Melanie Nicholls-King as Cheryl
8. Michael Potts as Brother Mouzone
9. Bill Raymond as The Greek
10. Al Brown as Major Stanislaus Valchek
11. Robert F. Chew as Proposition Joe
12. Kristin Proctor as Aimee
13. Merritt Wever as Prissy
14. Benay Berger as FBI Supervisor Amanda Reese
15. Toni Lewis as Assistant United States Attorney Nadiva Bryant
16. Tom Mardirosian as Agent Koutris
17. Delaney Williams as Sergeant Jay Landsman
18. Teddy Cañez as George "Double G" Glekas
19. Jeffrey Fugitt as Officer Claude Diggins
20. Lev Gorens as Eton Ben-Eleazer
21. Charley Scalies as Thomas "Horseface" Pakusa
22. J.D. Williams as Preston "Boadie" Broadus
23. Chris Ashworth as Sergei Malatov
24. Kevin McKelvy as FBI Agent
25. S. Robert Morgan as Butchie
26. Doug Olear as FBI Special Agent Terrance "Fitz" Fitzhugh
27. William L. Thomas as FBI Agent

==== Uncredited appearances ====
- Michael K. Williams as Omar Little
- De'Rodd Hearns as Puddin
- Jeffrey Pratt Gordon as Johnny "Fifty" Spamanto
- Richard Burton as Sean "Shamrock" McGinty
- DeAndre McCullough as Lamar
- Bus Howard as Ott
- Tommy Hahn as FBI Special Agent Salmond
- Wes Johnson as Security Supervisor

=== First appearances ===
- Lamar: Mouzone's dim-witted assistant. Lamar is played by DeAndre McCulloch, one of the people David Simon wrote about in The Corner: A Year in the Life of an Inner-City Neighborhood.
- Prissy: a friend of Nick, former girlfriend of Ziggy. Previously mentioned in "Backwash"

== Reception ==
On its debut, "Storm Warnings" had 3.51 million viewers and a 2.4 rating, ranked by Nielsen Media Research as the second most popular premium cable program of the week ending August 10, 2003. Alan Sepinwall of The Star-Ledger praised James Ransone for "one of the most indelible performances of the season" despite playing "such a deliberately irritating character" of Ziggy. For The Guardian, Judith Soal called the scene of Ziggy shooting Double G "shocking" for showing "a Baltimore nobody could take out one of the Greek's top men" and "Ziggy's personal transformation from an immature object of ridicule to a person of (rather severe) consequence."

Samuel Walters graded the episode with a B+ for Dauntless Media: "Each of the episode’s major developments is driven by some kind of conflict which has roots in mistrust, suspicion, or downright dishonesty....[T]his episode’s commentary is on how dysfunctional large groups of people inevitably become, even when they are working toward the same general goals, due to motivations of greed, jealousy, or conceit."
