= Collateral Damage (The Wire) =

- The Wire episode
- Episode no.: Season 2 Episode 2
- Directed by: Ed Bianchi
- Story by: David Simon; Ed Burns
- Teleplay by: David Simon
- Original air date: June 8, 2003
- Running time: 58 minutes

Episode chronology
← Previous "Ebb Tide"	Next → "Hot Shots"
- The Wire season 2

"Collateral Damage" is the 15th episode of the American crime drama The Wire, also the second episode of the show's second season. The episode was written by David Simon from a story by Simon and Ed Burns and was directed by Ed Bianchi. It premiered June 8, 2003, on HBO in the U.S.

== Guest stars ==
- Seth Gilliam as Detective Ellis Carver
- Domenick Lombardozzi as Detective Thomas "Herc" Hauk
- Jim True-Frost as Detective Roland "Prez" Pryzbylewski
- James Ransone as Ziggy Sobotka
- Pablo Schreiber as Nick Sobotka
- Michael Hyatt as Brianna Barksdale
- Bill Raymond as The Greek
- Al Brown as Major Stan Valchek
- Hassan Johnson as Roland "Wee-Bey" Brice
- Delaney Williams as Sergeant Jay Landsman
- Maria Broom as Marla Daniels
- Luray Cooper as Nat Coxson
- Erik Todd Dellums as Randall Frazier
- Charley Scalies as Thomas "Horseface" Pakusa
- Chris Ashworth as Sergei Malatov
- Gerard Ender as Sam
- Jeffrey Fugitt as Claude Diggins
- Brook Yeaton as "White" Mike McArdle

== Plot summary ==
Beadie deals with various agencies trying to decide which will investigate the bodies she found in the shipping container. The coroner determines the women suffocated because of a crushed air pipe on the top of the container. Meanwhile, Bunk learns that McNulty spent three hours working out where his floater was dumped in order to establish that it fell under Rawls' jurisdiction. McNulty and Beadie establish that the floater that he found in the harbor is related, as there is an extra bedroll in the container. Beadie and McNulty meet with the coroner, who agrees that this is grounds to consider the deaths as homicides.

Rawls meets with Ronnie, the commander of the Port Authority, and resists an attempt to hand off the Jane Doe cases. Rawls meets with the commanders of the other jurisdictions involved with the Jane Does, who all insist that the murders occurred in Rawls' jurisdiction. The cases are subsequently assigned to Homicide, initially to Ray Cole, but subsequently reassigned to Bunk and Freamon. The pair travel to the Port Authority and meet with Beadie. In Philadelphia, where the ship that carried the container is now docked, they interrogate the crew. McNulty awakens naked and hungover in Rhonda Pearlman's bed after celebrating getting the cases assigned to Rawls, while Daniels talks with his wife Marla about his career. Daniels says he will hand in his resignation papers.

Frank meets with his smuggling contact, Spiros "Vondas" Vondopoulos, insisting on being informed when human cargo moves through the docks. Afterward, Vondas speaks to another man in the cafe, who is revealed to be The Greek. Back at the union house, Horseface and Ott complain about harassment by the police, who Frank learns are acting under orders from Valchek. The next day, Valchek accuses Frank of illegally funding the stained glass window he donated to their church. After Frank threatens him, Valchek visits a property developer, Andy Krawczyk, and learns that Frank's financially troubled labor union has given large political contributions. Valchek meets with Ervin Burrell, in line to be appointed commissioner, and promises to rally support for him on the City Council in return for a detail investigating Frank; Burrell gives him a squad of six men for six weeks.

At the bar, Ziggy asks his cousin Nick to partner with him in selling drugs through a connection named "White Mike." Nick refuses his offer. On the way to a job, the stevedores are stopped at a police DUI checkpoint led by Sergeant Ellis Carver. Ziggy meets White Mike and asks to give him the package with payment to follow, but Mike refuses since Ziggy has messed up his last two attempts. After the stevedores are released, Horseface infiltrates Valchek's district station and steals a surveillance van filled with equipment. He drives it to the docks and La La, Frank and Nick help him load it into a container. Valchek assembles and briefs his new detail, including his son-in-law Prez, at their port side offices.

Brianna Barksdale visits her brother Avon in prison and pleads with him to look out for her son D'Angelo, as he took a twenty-year sentence for their family. When Brianna informs him that the New York Dominicans are no longer doing business with the Barksdales, Avon recommends an Atlanta contact named Vargas. Brianna and Avon note that D'Angelo's girlfriend Donette has not been keeping in touch with him. Wee-Bey is harassed by a corrections officer named Dwight Tilghman, who is the cousin of one of the victims of a crime that Wee-Bey took the fall for. Avon tells Stringer that he needs to help with Tilghman and asks that he find Donette. Stringer questions D'Angelo's loyalty, but Avon insists he can be trusted. Avon finds D'Angelo snorting heroin with another inmate and tells him that they need to talk.

Using fake Coast Guard identification, Sergei and an associate go to Philadelphia. When one of the crewmen on the cargo ship comes ashore, they chase him down, beat him and throw him into the back seat of their car. Sergei and the associate violently interrogate the crewman, who turns out to be a Turk named Sam. After Vondas and The Greek arrive, Sam initially pleads for his life in Greek, but after an ostensibly kind request from The Greek to tell him what happened, he admits that he allowed his crew access to the smuggled prostitutes in exchange for money and that one of them was killed when she resisted. Her body was dumped overboard, and Sam killed the other women to silence them. Once Sam's tale is finished, Vondas slowly cuts his throat. The Greek orders Sergei to leave the corpse without fingerprints or a face.

=== First appearances ===
- "White" Mike McArdle: East side drug dealer who has supplied Ziggy Sobotka with packages in the past.
- CO Dwight Tilghman: Embittered correctional officer whose cousin was killed by Wee-Bey Brice.
- Andy Krawczyk: Property developer and political fundraiser.
- This is the first episode that deals with Ervin Burrell being promoted to Acting Commissioner.

== Reception ==
The episode had nearly 3.5 million viewers when it was first broadcast on HBO on June 8, 2003, a 21 percent decline from the previous week's season premiere. For the Baltimore City Paper, Bret McCabe found the "behind-the-scenes in-fighting" shown in this episode among the Baltimore Police to be "rarely" dramatized on television. New York Daily News critic David Hinckley observed more plot and character development in this episode than the season premiere. For The Guardian, Paul Owen praised the "lovingly shot images of industrial decline [and] long roads curving away from factories fallen silent".

In a 2009 retrospective about The Wire season 2, Alan Sepinwall observed about this episode that Sobotka is one of the few characters "who isn't in any way motivated by self-interest" and Ziggy to be "one of the more polarizing characters...so pitiful, so obnoxious".
