= Hot Shots (The Wire) =

- The Wire episode
- Episode no.: Season 2 Episode 3
- Directed by: Elodie Keene
- Story by: David Simon; Ed Burns
- Teleplay by: David Simon
- Original air date: June 15, 2003
- Running time: 58 minutes

Episode chronology
← Previous "Collateral Damage"	Next → "Hard Cases"
- The Wire season 2

"Hot Shots" is the third episode of the second season of the HBO original series The Wire. The episode was written by David Simon from a story by David Simon & Ed Burns and was directed by Elodie Keene. It originally aired on June 15, 2003.

== Plot ==
In Philadelphia, Bunk and Freamon interview the crew of the ship that brought the Jane Does into Baltimore, but all pretend to speak no English. The first mate is more forthcoming and explains that the crew members will not speak English in the police's presence, and would not inform on each other, even if interpreters were provided. The detectives agree to let the ship go with little evidence or jurisdiction for interrogation. Later, Bunk and Beadie try to trace the movements of the shipping container in which the bodies were found and discover that much of the paperwork has been falsified.

McNulty learns that three of the Jane Does had received breast implants at the same clinic in Budapest and others performed various sex acts in the 24 hours before their deaths. McNulty visits Homicide to share his theory, but Bunk, Freamon and Beadie beat him to everything he was about to say. Bunk's team take the French addresses listed on the paperwork to the FBI, who give them more information on the international vice trade. Later, while out drinking, McNulty learns that Beadie is a single mother.

Valchek is informed of his missing surveillance van, which is shown to have been delivered to stevedores in Wilmington, North Carolina. Prez is annoyed that the Sobotka detail's commander, Lieutenant Grayson, will not authorize any wiretaps of Frank, and tells Valchek that Daniels would have brought in a better case on the Barksdale detail if Burrell had not interfered. When Valchek threatens to torpedo Burrell's efforts to become commissioner, the latter is forced to assign Daniels to the detail. Meanwhile, Omar and his new boyfriend Dante join forces with Tosha Mitchell and Kimmy to stick up stash houses together.

McNulty encounters Daniels in the evidence room, and the two discuss their career misfortunes. Daniels tells McNulty that he has put in for early retirement and plans to become a lawyer. Later, McNulty returns his sons to his ex-wife Elena, who sends him a separation agreement shortly afterward. Meanwhile, Nick's girlfriend Aimee wants them to move in together, which he promises to do when they can afford it. Ziggy tries to convince Nick to join him in the drug trade. The two steal a container of cameras with the help of Johnny Fifty and sell them to George "Double G" Glekas, a fence for the Greeks. Ziggy angers Glekas by taking his photo with one of the cameras. Glekas checks the deal with Vondas and tells him that although he thinks Ziggy is using drugs and is a "malakas," Nick can be trusted.

Frank attends a political meeting at Father Lewandowski's church with his lobbyist, Bruce DiBiago, who advises him to focus on courting politicians who may not support the stevedores union, including State Senator Clay Davis. Frank takes umbrage when he is told exactly how much money has been routed to Davis but is forced to make nice with the senator to win his support. Davis makes it clear that he expects more money to come his way in order to vote along with the union's wishes. Frank later meets with a checker named Ringo who is having trouble getting enough work to live on. When Ringo mentions he's contemplating a move to a different local, Frank sends Ringo to Delores's bar and tells him to order a shot and a beer on him. When Ringo arrives at the bar and uses Frank's name, Delores gives him a bundle of cash. Ziggy sees the exchange.

Stringer discusses his stock portfolio with a financial advisor via telephone, while Country and Shamrock listen in; they are together in a vehicle while on the tail of Tilghman. Later, Country and Shamrock watch as Tilghman receives a package of narcotics from Butchie. On Avon's orders, Stringer contacts Butchie and asks him to supply Tilghman with bad product the next time he makes a transaction. Butchie reluctantly agrees when Stringer uses Avon's name and promises compensation. It is revealed that Stringer and D'Angelo's girlfriend, Donette, are having an affair. Avon finds D'Angelo in the prison library and tells him to avoid drugs for a few days. D'Angelo is subsequently unaffected when Tilghman unwittingly smuggles bad heroin into the prison and causes several other inmates to die.

== Production ==
=== Epigraph ===
What they need is a union.

— Russell

=== Music ===
- The song playing when Omar and Dante are in the bedroom is "Get Busy" by Sean Paul.
- The song heard in Tilghman's car is "So Fine" by The Chambers Brothers.
- The song playing when Stringer visits Donette is "Sweet Thing" by Rufus, as covered by Mary J. Blige.
- ‘’The Great Pretender’’ by The Platters as covered by The Band is heard when Beadie, Bunk, and McNulty are drinking at a bar.
- "It's My Party" by Lesley Gore can be heard when Ringo meets with Sobotka.
- The song that can be heard when Nick and Ziggy are stealing the container is "Sweat It Out" by Joe Grushecky and the Houserockers.
- The song playing in Delores' bar when Ringo enters is "Mellow Down Easy" by the Paul Butterfield Blues Band.
- The song heard while Avon is reading his book at the end of the episode is "The Cisco Kid" by War.

=== Credits ===
Although credited, John Doman, Deirdre Lovejoy, and Sonja Sohn do not appear in this episode.

==== Guest stars ====
1. Seth Gilliam as Detective Ellis Carver
2. Domenick Lombardozzi as Detective Thomas "Herc" Hauk
3. Jim True-Frost as Detective Roland "Prez" Pryzbylewski
4. James Ransone as Ziggy Sobotka
5. Pablo Schreiber as Nick Sobotka
6. Kristin Proctor as Aimee
7. Callie Thorne as Elena McNulty
8. Michael K. Williams as Omar Little
9. Al Brown as Major Stan Valchek
10. Richard Burton as Sean "Shamrock" McGinty
11. S. Robert Morgan as Butchie
12. Charley Scalies as Thomas "Horseface" Pakusa
13. Delaney Williams as Sergeant Jay Landsman
14. Shamyl Brown as Donette
15. Luray Cooper as Nat Coxson
16. Michael Mack as Special Agent Marcus Lemmel
17. Kevin Murray as Special Agent Cleary
18. Ernest Waddell as Dante
19. Kelli R. Brown as Kimmy
20. Edwina Findley as Tosha Mitchell
21. Keith Flippen as Bruce DiBiago
22. Jon Garcia as Ringo
23. Tel Monks as Father Jerome Lewandowski

==== Uncredited appearances ====
- Isiah Whitlock, Jr. as Senator Clay Davis
- Antonio Charity as CO Dwight Tilghman
- Erik Todd Dellums as Dr. Randall Frazier
- Jeffrey Pratt Gordon as Johnny "Fifty" Spamanto
- Jill Redding as Delores
- Nat Benchley as Augustus Polk
- Antonio Cordova as Michael McNulty
- Eric Ryan as Sean McNulty

=== First appearances ===
- Butchie: Supplier to CO Dwight Tilghman and adviser to Omar Little.
- Aimee: Nick Sobotka's girlfriend and mother of his child.
- Dante: Omar's new boyfriend and partner in crime.
- Kimmy and Tosha: A young lesbian couple who make their living robbing drug dealers.
- Ringo: Down-on-his-luck checker from Sobotka's union.

== Reception ==
On its debut, "Hot Shots" had nearly 2.64 million viewers and a 1.8 rating. For The Baltimore Sun, David Zurawik compared Jimmy McNulty to Frank Pembleton, a police detective in Simon's previous series Homicide: Life on the Street, for "talking about how someone has to speak for the dead victim and bring the killer to justice" during the human trafficking investigation.

In a 2009 retrospective about The Wire, Alan Sepinwall observed similarities between Nick Sobotka and D'Angelo Barksdale: "Both are nephews of the detail's main target. Both have kids with women they like well enough, just not enough to really want to marry them. Both are finding that the family business isn't as rosy as they were raised to believe, and both are letting their relatives suck them deeper into a life of crime than they intend." Also in 2009, Mark Smith of The Guardian summarized a theme of this episode: "Virtually all the dockers seem to be involved in criminality in some way, but they are still merely pawns for the greater, and more immoral, pursuit of wealth by the Greek and his cartel on one side, and the politicians on the other."
