= Port in a Storm =

- The Wire episode
- Episode no.: Season 2 Episode 12
- Directed by: Robert F. Colesberry
- Story by: David Simon; Ed Burns
- Teleplay by: David Simon
- Original air date: August 24, 2003
- Running time: 63 minutes

Episode chronology
← Previous "Bad Dreams"	Next → "Time After Time"
- The Wire season 2

"Port in a Storm" is the 12th and final episode of the second season of the American police drama series The Wire. It debuted on August 24, 2003, in the U.S. on HBO. The episode was written by David Simon from a story by David Simon & Ed Burns and was directed by Robert F. Colesberry. Its story centers on Baltimore Police shifting its investigation after the death of Frank Sobotka, a labor union leader who turns witness to a drug and human trafficking scheme, along with a federal investigation into Sobotka's former stevedore union.

On its debut, "Port in a Storm" had nearly 4.5 million viewers. The Futon Critic named it one of the best TV episodes of 2003.

== Plot ==
When Frank fails to return home from his meeting with The Greek, Nick goes looking for him. He watches as Frank's body is retrieved from the harbor, his throat having been slit. After Nick's father Louis has him turn himself in, Freamon takes him to the detail.

The Greek and Vondas discuss the discovery of Frank’s corpse and whether Nick will turn on them. Disclosing to the audience that Nick in fact knows virtually nothing about their identities—Vondas is operating under a pseudonym, and “The Greek” is in fact not actually Greek at all—the mysterious pair agrees to leave Nick alone and walk away from Baltimore.

The stevedores union is decertified and seized when the union members, including Ott, stand in solidarity behind the deceased Frank's re-election as treasurer in defiance of the FBI.

Stringer visits Brother Mouzone at the hospital and promises to catch whomever was responsible for his shooting. Mouzone coolly informs Stringer that he needs no assistance and will find those responsible on his own. Stringer incriminates himself when he jumps at Mouzone's use of plurals when describing his attackers.

Bubbles and Johnny are arrested by Officer Michael Santangelo for stealing medical supplies from an ambulance. In exchange for getting the charges dropped, Bubbles tells Greggs and McNulty about Mouzone's shooting of Cheese at the Barksdale towers and Stringer's collaboration with the East Side drug kingpins. Meanwhile, Omar and Butchie realize that the shooting with Mouzone was a set-up by Stringer. Omar vows to get revenge. In prison, Avon begrudgingly agrees to work with Joe, but is noticeably unhappy with Stringer. The subsequent meeting between Stringer and Joe is photographed by Greggs and McNulty.

Daniels blackmails Valchek into not pressing charges against Prez, pointing to witness statements given by the detail and the FBI. Nick gives up information on Vondas, Eton, and Serge. He also identifies The Greek from McNulty's serendipitous photo, but is unable to give them anything beyond that. Fitz decides to check on Agent Koutris and is dismayed to learn that he has been transferred to the FBI's counterterrorism office in Washington. When Herc and Carver learn they've been left out of the loop about Nick's cooperation, they conclude that Daniels is not properly using them in the detail. Carver tells Daniels that he will request a transfer to Colvin's district in West Baltimore before storming out.

Freamon, Bunk, and Beadie travel to the Port of Philadelphia to investigate the murdered crewman. Using security tapes, they place Serge at the scene of the killing. Under questioning, Serge is forced to admit that he was present when Vondas killed the crewman in retaliation for his murder of the Jane Does. Elsewhere, Greggs' downbeat attitude about parenthood causes tensions with Cheryl.

The FBI places Nick and his family in witness protection in a basic motel. The next day, Nick leaves the hotel and is unable to find a day's work at the docks. Under pressure from Daniels, Serge reveals a location that The Greek uses for meetings. Daniels and his team move on The Greek's hotel, unaware that Vondas and The Greek are already leaving the country. With the port case over, Greggs and McNulty convince Daniels to use his new unit to go after Stringer and Joe. Fitz tells Daniels that the leak was not from Daniels' agency, but rather likely from the FBI's counterterrorism office, who would find The Greek's vast network to be valuable for the War on Terror. Valchek opens a letter from Australia with a photo of the surveillance van that is still being transported around the globe.

In the closing montage, Nick mourns his uncle's death by staring over the water near the docks; U.S. Marshals close the union hall; Pearlman prosecutes Eton and Horseface; Rawls and Landsman celebrate the clearance of their Jane Does; Ziggy is incarcerated; Davis and other politicians break ground on the condominiums that will replace the grain pier; Beadie returns to the port police; Freamon dismantles the detail's investigative board, leaving up the photo of The Greek; Frog's crew drives an old woman to sell her home; Poot and Puddin watch the police patrol their territory; and Joe takes a shipment of drugs from the back of a truck carrying newly-arrived trafficked women. The season concludes as Nick walks away and rain begins to pour.

== Production ==
=== Epigraph ===
Business. Always business.

— The Greek

This quote is from a scene of The Greek telling an airline ticket clerk that he is traveling for business purposes.

=== Music ===
Hank Williams' "A Mansion on the Hill" plays when Beadie and Bunk visit the Philadelphia port security office. A cover version of Creedence Clearwater Revival's "Have You Ever Seen the Rain?" by Joan Jett plays at the bar where the detail drown their sorrows. The Steve Earle song "I Feel Alright" plays over the closing montage. Earle has a small recurring role as a drug counselor named Walon, but does not appear in this season. Earle also sings Tom Waits' "Way Down in the Hole" for the fifth season opening credits of the show.

=== Credits ===
==== Guest stars ====
1. Seth Gilliam as Detective Ellis Carver
2. Domenick Lombardozzi as Detective Thomas "Herc" Hauk
3. Jim True-Frost as Detective Roland "Prez" Pryzbylewski (credited, but does not appear)
4. James Ransone as Ziggy Sobotka
5. Pablo Schreiber as Nick Sobotka
6. Melanie Nicholls-King as Cheryl
7. Michael Potts as Brother Mouzone
8. Bill Raymond as The Greek
9. Michael K. Williams as Omar Little
10. Maria Broom as Marla Daniels
11. Al Brown as Major Stanislaus Valchek
12. Robert F. Chew as Proposition Joe
13. Kristin Proctor as Aimee
14. Tray Chaney as Malik "Poot" Carr
15. Robert Hogan as Louis Sobotka
16. Michael Salconi as Officer Michael Santangelo
17. Charley Scalies as Thomas "Horseface" Pakusa
18. Delaney Williams as Sergeant Jay Landsman
19. Chris Ashworth as Sergei Malatov
20. Richard Burton as Shamrock
21. Leo Fitzpatrick as Johnny Weeks
22. Jeffrey Fugitt as Officer Claude Diggins
23. S. Robert Morgan as Butchie
24. Luray Cooper as Nat Coxson
25. Kelvin Davis as La La
26. Bus Howard as Ott
27. Lance Irwin as Maui
28. Jeffrey Pratt Gordon as Johnny "Fifty" Spamanto
29. Benay Berger as FBI Supervisor Amanda Reese
30. Tommy Hahn as FBI Special Agent Salmond
31. Kevin McKelvy as FBI Agent
32. Doug Olear as FBI Special Agent Terrance "Fitz" Fitzhugh
33. William L. Thomas as FBI Agent
34. Isiah Whitlock, Jr. as Senator Clay Davis

==== Uncredited appearances ====
- Brian Anthony Wilson as Detective Vernon Holley
- Michael Willis as Andy Krawczyk
- Lev Gorn as Eton Ben-Eleazer
- Brook Yeaton as "White" Mike McArdle
- Gary "D-Reign" as Frog
- De'Rodd Hearns as Puddin
- DeAndre McCullough as Lamar
- Richard Pelzman as Little Big Roy
- Doug Lory as Big Roy
- J. Valenteen Gregg as Chess
- Jon Garcia as Ringo
- Paul Majors as Officer MacGraul
- Schuster Vance as Walt Stokes

== Reception ==
"Port in a Storm" was the second most watched program on U.S. premium cable for the week ending August 24, 2003, with 4.48 million viewers and a Nielsen Media Research rating of 3.0.

The Futon Critic named it the 16th best television episode of 2003: "'The Wire' once again reminded us happy endings are all too rare in the 'real' world with its second season finale." Kevin D. Thompson of The Palm Beach Post wrote in a review shortly after the episode's debut that The Wire was "television's best show" and called the plots of season two "intricately woven".

For The Star-Ledger, Alan Sepinwall found "a sense of hopelessness" in this episode, similar to the season 1 finale "Sentencing", and cited this episode as an example of The Wire being "profound, and moving, and funny, and well-acted" despite "tragedy and despair" in the stories.

Paul Owen of The Guardian observed that the episode "gradually resumes its focus on the black housing estates and sets the scene for the next series" while expressing disappointment that the dockworker characters were written off.
