= Bad Dreams (The Wire) =

- The Wire episode
- Episode no.: Season 2 Episode 11
- Directed by: Ernest Dickerson
- Story by: David Simon; George Pelecanos
- Teleplay by: George Pelecanos
- Original air date: August 17, 2003
- Running time: 58 minutes

Episode chronology
← Previous "Storm Warnings"	Next → "Port in a Storm"
- The Wire season 2

"Bad Dreams" is the 11th episode of the second season of the American police drama television series The Wire. It originally aired on HBO in the U.S. on August 17, 2003. The episode was written by George Pelecanos from a story by David Simon and George Pelecanos and was directed by Ernest Dickerson. The story focuses on the aftermath of the arrests of Frank Sobotka and associates for a drug trafficking scheme and the resulting conflict within Sobotka's family.

On its debut, "Bad Dreams" had nearly 3.7 million viewers. It was praised in reviews by The Guardian and The Star-Ledger.

== Plot ==
The Sobotka detail serve warrants. Daniels, Bunk, Greggs and Freamon find Glekas' warehouse completely stripped of evidence. Weapons are found in Eton's home while Serge and White Mike are arrested. Herc and Carver search Nick's residence, finding heroin and cash. Daniels decides to leave Vondas on the street, hoping to identify the man he works for. When he learns that Glekas was killed by Ziggy, Daniels is outraged that Landsman left him out of the loop and that their investigation has been compromised. Meanwhile, Frank and Horseface calmly accept their arrests when the FBI raids their union. Reese delays taking the captives outside until the press arrives. The Greek's associates refuse to talk under questioning, but White Mike gives up information on Eton and Serge. Frank's lawyers shepherd him through a detention hearing.

The detail focuses attention on Vondas, who is tailed from his home to a meeting at the Inner Harbor. Greggs and Beadie follow Vondas into a parking garage, with Beadie getting her first foot pursuit by tailing Vondas to his hotel room. McNulty photographs Vondas leaving the hotel with his lawyer, mistakenly believing the attorney to be Vondas' superior, and happens to get a chance shot of The Greek. Vondas switches cars and loses Greggs, who is oblivious as The Greek walks past her. Daniels and Pearlman mistakenly assume that Vondas' lawyer is in charge of the smuggling ring. Beadie volunteers to approach Frank and convince him to cooperate in exchange for probation and witness protection. After spending the night with Prissy and avoiding the raid, Nick returns home and is treated coldly by his parents as they clean up after the police. Frank visits a jailed Ziggy, who expresses resentment that his father spent more time with union business than him, and remorse for killing Glekas. Louis, Frank's brother and Nick's father, confronts Frank about his failure to keep Nick out of a life of crime.

Frank's arrest makes him a pariah within the union, but he is allowed to work a ship. Bruce tells Frank that the arrest has dried up his political support. Beadie urges Frank to come forward as an informant to save himself, telling him that there are different kinds of wrong and that he is better than those he has gotten involved with. Frank comes to the detail and agrees to cooperate, so Nick can get leniency and Ziggy can be moved to a safer jail, on condition that he does not give up any union men. Pearlman agrees on straight probation for Frank and Nick. Vondas convinces Nick to set up a meeting with Frank with the promise of helping Ziggy, causing Frank to reconsider his deal with the police. Frank decides to meet The Greek and Vondas alone underneath the Francis Scott Key Bridge, putting his son above his dreams for the docks. However, by this point The Greek has been tipped off by Agent Koutris that Frank has turned informant, making it unlikely that Frank will survive the meeting.

Stringer tells Omar that Brother Mouzone was responsible for torturing and killing Brandon, offering to give him up if Omar will cease his pursuit of the Barksdale Organization. With the aid of his crew, Omar knocks out Mouzone's partner Lamar and shoots Mouzone. When Omar explains why he is there, Mouzone tells him that he has been misinformed. Omar believes his story and phones for an ambulance on his way out of the hotel.

== Production ==
=== Epigraph ===
I need to get clean.

— Sobotka

=== Music ===
The two Greek songs at the end of the episode were sung by Stelios Kazantzidis. In the restaurant, the song playing in the background was "To Psomi tis Ksenitias" (Bread of a Foreign Land). The song played during the montage at the end is a less well-known song, "Ena Sidero Anameno" (Ένα σίδερο αναμένο; also known by its refrain, Ephyge, "She left") a love song. Both songs were chosen by the episode's writer George Pelecanos who is Greek American.

=== Credits ===
==== Starring cast ====
Although credited, John Doman and Wood Harris do not appear in this episode.

==== Guest stars ====
1. Seth Gilliam as Detective Ellis Carver
2. Domenick Lombardozzi as Detective Thomas "Herc" Hauk
3. Jim True-Frost as Detective Roland "Prez" Pryzbylewski (credited, but does not appear)
4. James Ransone as Ziggy Sobotka
5. Pablo Schreiber as Nick Sobotka
6. Michael Potts as Brother Mouzone
7. Michael K. Williams as Omar Little
8. Chris Ashworth as Sergei Malatov
9. Al Brown as Major Stanislaus Valchek
10. Bill Raymond as The Greek
11. Delaney Williams as Sergeant Jay Landsman
12. Luray Cooper as Nat Coxson
13. Robert Hogan as Louis Sobotka
14. Bus Howard as Ott
15. Doug Lory as Big Roy
16. Richard Pelzman as Little Big Roy
17. Benay Berger as FBI Supervisor Amanda Reese
18. Toni Lewis as Assistant United States Attorney Nadiva Bryant
19. Kevin McKelvy as FBI Agent
20. Doug Olear as FBI Agent Terrance "Fitz" Fitzhugh
21. William L. Thomas as FBI Agent
22. Kelli R. Brown as Kimmy
23. Edwina Findley as Tosha Mitchell
24. Tom Mardirosian as Agent Koutris
25. Gordana Rashovich as Ilona Petrovich
26. Brook Yeaton as "White" Mike McArdle
27. Keith Flippen as Bruce DiBiago
28. Aphrodite Georgelakos as Unknown
29. Clifton Gross as stevedore
30. Steve Lukiewski as stevedore
31. Jackie Sawiris as Unknown
32. Paul G. Sepczynski as stevedore

==== Uncredited appearances ====
- Derren M. Fuentes as QRT Leader Torret
- Tommy Hahn as FBI Special Agent Salmond
- Merritt Wever as Prissy
- Lev Gorens as Eton Ben-Eleazer
- Charley Scalies as Thomas "Horseface" Pakusa
- Jeffrey Pratt Gordon as Johnny "Fifty" Spamanto
- Elisabeth Noone as Joan Sobotka
- DeAndre McCullough as Lamar
- David Simon as reporter at Sobotka's arrest

Clifton Gross, Steve Lukiewski, and Paul G. Sepczynski are all real-life stevedores who appear as stevedores in this episode. Lukiewski is a hiring hall dispatcher and emulates this position when Sobotka uses another member's card to work. Gross and Sepczynski are the stevedores helping Sobotka to unload the ship.

== Reception ==
"Bad Dreams" had nearly 3.7 million viewers on its debut, ranked by Nielsen Media Research as the third most popular U.S. premium cable program of the week ending August 17, 2003, behind HBO's Sex and the City and The Sopranos.

Alan Sepinwall of The Star-Ledger praised the writing of George Pelecanos, comparing it to "the last 70 or 80 pages of a really good thriller", and the acting of Chris Bauer as "one of the more complicated characters" Frank Sobotka. For The Guardian, Paul Owen highlighted the rare use of incidental music in the final scene for making it "all the more powerful" and the fast pacing for making the last episodes of season two "very exciting".
