= Hard Cases =

- The Wire episode
- Episode no.: Season 2 Episode 4
- Directed by: Elodie Keene
- Story by: David Simon; Joy Lusco
- Teleplay by: Joy Lusco
- Original air date: June 22, 2003
- Running time: 58 minutes

Episode chronology
← Previous "Hot Shots"	Next → "Undertow"
- The Wire season 2

"Hard Cases" is the fourth episode of the second season of the HBO original series The Wire. The episode was written by Joy Lusco from a story by David Simon & Joy Lusco and was directed by Elodie Keene. It originally aired on June 22, 2003.

== Plot ==
As McNulty tries to identify the Jane Does, he finds a letter written in a foreign language amongst their clothes. McNulty has the letter translated, but learns only the girl's name and some sparse details about her home country. Bunk and Freamon tell Rawls that they must investigate how goods move through the port to understand what happened with the shipping container. Rawls tells them they should have held the ship in Philadelphia and that they are his scapegoats if their investigation is not fruitful. The detectives try to get Horseface to tell them more about the container. Later, after Beadie shows them the stevedores' bar, they hassle both Horseface and Frank, who is terrified when he learns that the Jane Does were murdered.

To appease Valchek and convince Daniels to take the case, Burrell offers Daniels command of the Sobotka detail with the promise of a promotion. Seeing he is in a superior bargaining position, Daniels demands his own permanent unit if the investigation is successful, and the chance to pick his own people; Burrell agrees. Rawls allows Daniels to take most of his choices but refuses to let McNulty leave the marine unit. Daniels persuades Greggs to join the detail despite Cheryl's desire for her to work a desk job. Daniels' wife Marla has a difficult reaction to his promotion, and storms out of dinner after he tells her about it. Kima gets the same reaction from Cheryl.

While Daniels briefs Valchek, Herc and Greggs are reunited with Prez. Herc suggests that Carver be recruited, but Daniels ignores him and states that the detail needs to accrue at least a few drug busts by the harbor before adding to its number. Meanwhile, Bunk and ASA Ilene Nathan continue to pressure McNulty to find Omar in time for Bird's trial. While cruising around West Baltimore, McNulty spots Bubbles and Johnny; after following the pair out to Baltimore County, he catches them shoplifting and threatens to arrest them unless they find Omar for him. Kimmy, one of Omar's new crew, overhears Bubbles asking around for him, leading Omar to set a trap for the vagrant and ask why he is looking for him.

The drug deaths in prison spark an investigation. Avon tries to convince D'Angelo to use the situation to their advantage and cooperate with investigators to reduce their sentences. D'Angelo refuses to believe that Avon was not involved with the deaths, and states that he no longer wants anything to do with the drug business. Avon works with his attorney, Maurice Levy, to negotiate a reduction of his time until his first parole hearing in exchange for information about the deaths. Despite the investigator's suspicion that Avon was involved, the attorney general bluntly tells him to take the deal. Levy subsequently fingers Tilghman, who is arrested after a planted drug package is found in his car. Elsewhere, Stringer orders Cherry, the manager of his cut house, to dilute their latest package from Atlanta despite its already-poor quality.

Frank demands that Nick return the stolen cameras, only to learn that they have been fenced. The two argue about Frank's own illegal activities, which Frank tries to justify by saying he uses the money to help the stevedores union. Nick delivers Ziggy's share and warns him not to flash the money around, telling him that Frank knows about the theft. However, Ziggy buys a $2,000 leather coat. Nick and Ziggy meet with Glekas, who asks them to acquire chemicals for him. Ziggy takes the list to Johnny Fifty, who points them to a contact in another area. As Ziggy leaves, he is accosted by Maui, another checker, who intentionally spills coffee on Ziggy's jacket and mocks him for stealing from the docks. Ziggy later gets his revenge by littering Maui's computer monitor with photographs of his genitals.

Nick talks to his mother Joan about having had a successful day's employment at the docks and goes to bring his father Louis home for dinner. Louis retired from the drydock when it closed and now spends much of his time drinking and betting on horse races. Nick asks Louis if he misses the docks, to which he replies, "Wouldn't do no good." To Aimee's surprise, Nick tells her that he has come into "some back pay" and suggests they look to buy a property in the neighborhood.

== Production ==
=== Epigraph ===
If I hear the music, I'm gonna dance.

— Greggs

Greggs makes this statement about her inability to return to investigative work without becoming fully involved.

=== Music ===
- The song playing when Ziggy is fooling around with the camera in Dolores' bar is "Must Have Missed A Turn Somewhere" by Smokin' Joe Kubek.
- "He Was Really Sayin' Somethin'" by The Velvelettes can be heard when McNulty is asking the kids if they've seen Omar.
- "I Promise to Remember" by Frankie Lymon and The Teenagers can be heard as McNulty is about to ask the street gang if they've seen Omar.
- "Ruler Of My Heart" by Irma Thomas can be heard when McNulty spots Bubbles and Johnny
- The song playing when Greggs and Cheryl are stuck in traffic is "100% Dundee" by The Roots
- "Magic Carpet Ride" by Steppenwolf can be heard when Ziggy is on Maui's computer.
- "Your Good Girl's Gonna Go Bad" by Tammy Wynette is playing when Bunk, Freamon, and Beadie walk into Dolores' bar.
- The song that Bunk selects on the jukebox is "Maybe the Last Time" by James Brown.

=== Credits ===
==== Starring cast ====
Although credited, Paul Ben-Victor and Deirdre Lovejoy do not appear in this episode.

==== Guest stars ====
1. Seth Gilliam as Detective Ellis Carver
2. Domenick Lombardozzi as Detective Thomas "Herc" Hauk
3. Jim True-Frost as Detective Roland "Prez" Pryzbylewski
4. James Ransone as Ziggy Sobotka
5. Pablo Schreiber as Nick Sobotka
6. Melanie Nicholls-King as Cheryl
7. Callie Thorne as Elena McNulty
8. Michael K. Williams as Omar Little
9. Leo Fitzpatrick as Johnny
10. Robert Hogan as Louis Sobotka
11. Michael Kostroff as Maurice Levy
12. Kristin Proctor as Aimee
13. Al Brown as Major Stan Valchek
14. Richard Burton as Sean "Shamrock" McGinty
15. Lance Irwin as Maui
16. Delaney Williams as Sergeant Jay Landsman
17. Antonio Charity as CO Dwight Tilghman
18. Ted Feldman as George "Double G" Glekas
19. Elisabeth Noone as Joan Sobotka
20. Charley Scalies as Thomas "Horseface" Pakusa

==== Uncredited appearances ====
- Jeffrey Pratt Gordon as Johnny "Fifty" Spamanto
- Kelli R. Brown as Kimmy
- Stanley "Scoogie" Boyd as Cherry
- Leslie Elliard as Officer Kevin Reynolds
- Joseph Lane as Prison Guard
- Unknown as Prison Warden

=== First appearances ===
- Maui: a checker at the docks with animosity towards Ziggy Sobotka.
- Louis Sobotka: Brother of Frank Sobotka, husband to Joan Sobotka, and father of Nick Sobotka. A retired shipyard worker who spends his days drinking and watching horse races.

== Reception ==
The episode drew an average of 4.33 million viewers and was the fifth most-watched program on cable television for the week ending June 22, 2003.

In a 2009 review, Alan Sepinwall observed that the episode continued to show similarities between Nick Sobotka and D'Angelo Barksdale like the previous episode, this time for "rebelling against what their uncles want". For The Guardian, Saptarshi Ray compared Frank Sobotka's reliance on crime to the real-life drug trafficking case of John DeLorean.

Samuel Walters of Dauntless Media observed "a balanced approach between the police, the docks, and the street" in the plot and graded the episode a B for an "unfocused approach".
