= Duck and Cover (The Wire) =

- The Wire episode
- Episode no.: Season 2 Episode 8
- Directed by: Dan Attias
- Story by: David Simon; George Pelecanos
- Teleplay by: George Pelecanos
- Original air date: July 27, 2003
- Running time: 58 minutes

Episode chronology
← Previous "Backwash"	Next → "Stray Rounds"
- The Wire season 2

"Duck and Cover" is the eighth episode of the second season of the HBO original series The Wire. The episode was written by George Pelecanos from a story by David Simon and George Pelecanos and was directed by Dan Attias. It originally aired on July 27, 2003, and it was the second most popular program on U.S. premium cable on its debut week.

== Plot ==
After failing to reconcile with his ex-wife, McNulty goes on a drinking binge and tries to drive home drunk. After he crashes his car and cuts his hand, McNulty eats at a diner and ends up having a one-night stand with the waitress. While drinking with Bunk, he expresses a desire to work murder cases again.

Pearlman is shown how phone logs and photographic evidence link the East Baltimore warehouse to White Mike and Proposition Joe. They have identified Sergei and tracked his cell phone through truck rental records, showing that he calls the warehouse every day that a container goes missing. Herc and Carver have linked Nick to Frog, information which they have falsely reported as being obtained from an informant. The judge signs off on the detail's request for a wiretap but has Herc and Carver do chores in his house in exchange.

Daniels is persuaded to appeal to Rawls to allow McNulty's transfer to the Sobotka detail, which Rawls reluctantly does. Meanwhile, in a scheme to recover the money Carver lost on the destroyed surveillance bug, Herc gets his cousin Bernard to pose for photos as their fake informant, "Fuzzy Dunlop." Carver hands the paperwork to Daniels, who balks at the name and high price but signs off anyway. Pearlman meets with Bunk and Greggs, learning that the same company owns both the warehouse and the apartment building, which they speculate are being used as a cat house. They decide they need someone to go undercover to infiltrate the apartment as a john and settle on McNulty when he reports in on the Sobotka detail.

Greggs and McNulty set up surveillance of a parking garage at the apartment building. They pull over one of the johns and get him to explain how to contact the madam. Freamon, Beadie and Prez notice a potential container theft from a ship where Horseface is working as a checker. This time the surveillance work runs in combination with the wiretaps and the detail tracks the container to the warehouse. When Frank sends out a second container as a decoy, McNulty rushes to tail it. Beadie arranges to slow down the rig with a fictitious traffic stop until McNulty can get into position.

Ziggy is egged on by the other stevedores to retaliate against Maui's taunting. His attempt ends with Ziggy stranded atop a two-story container. When Horseface reports the dispute to Frank, he is too distracted by the stevedore union's month-end finances. Frank goes to pay his overdue cell phone bill and learns that his account is "flagged" to not be cut off—a possible clue that law enforcement is monitoring his activity. Later, he spots Greggs at the docks when she is posing as an engineer to watch the smuggling operation. He then learns that Beadie has been detailed to the Baltimore Police, and not transferred to Fairfield as she had claimed. Frank sends out the decoy container and sees it being stopped. He uses the untapped office phone to set up a meeting with The Greek; the detail sees that the call was made but cannot hear its contents.

Frank offers his brother Louis a position with the port advisory board. Louis refuses, noting the position has been offered to him because Frank made contributions and insists that everything he has comes straight. Frank is infuriated that Louis has a sense of moral superiority over his choices. Ziggy buys a duck from a neighborhood man who keeps birds. He meets with Nick, who asks about the fight with Maui and can't hide his amusement. Ziggy takes the duck to the bar, entertaining the other stevedores with the bird's propensity to drink whiskey and beer on top of the bar. Glekas and Sergei unload the clean container and angrily phone Vondas. The detail traces the call and recognizes it as the same number that Frank dialed. Vondas instructs Sergei to dump the container; McNulty follows it for a time but is recalled by Daniels.

Frank and Nick meet with The Greek, who is impressed by Frank's caution and suggests they only move clean containers for a while. Nick insists that they are to be paid in full for moving the containers, and The Greek agrees to their terms. After Frank slams the table, The Greek mocks him by saying he should spend some money on things that will make him happy, such as a new coat or a new car — a reference to Ziggy. Meanwhile, the detail dismisses the clean container as a mistake, but Freamon is pleased to have obtained Vondas' phone number. McNulty and Beadie go for a drink and discuss their past relationships. While at the bar, McNulty calls the number for the madam and sets up an appointment. McNulty has another drink at Beadie's home but leaves when he sees pictures of her children, realizing nothing good could come from sleeping with her.

Bodie, Poot and Puddin lament that their weak product has led to a lack of trade. After noticing an independent crew dealing on their territory with more success, Bodie and Poot organize a crew to drive them from the corner. They succeed but expect retaliation.

== Production ==
=== Epigraph ===
How come they don't fly away?

— Ziggy

=== Credits ===
==== Starring cast ====
Although credited, Idris Elba and Wood Harris do not appear in this episode. This is notable for being the first episode where Idris Elba does not appear.

==== Guest stars ====
- Seth Gilliam as Detective Ellis Carver
- Domenick Lombardozzi as Detective Thomas "Herc" Hauk
- Jim True-Frost as Detective Roland "Prez" Pryzbylewski
- James Ransone as Ziggy Sobotka
- Pablo Schreiber as Nick Sobotka
- Robert Hogan as Louis Sobotka
- Bill Raymond as The Greek
- J.D. Williams as Preston "Boadie" Broadus
- Chris Ashworth as Sergei Malatov
- Ted Feldman as George "Double G" Glekas
- Jeffrey Fugitt as Officer Claude Diggins
- Lance Irwin as Maui
- Charley Scalies as Thomas "Horseface" Pakusa
- Kelvin Davis as La La
- Bus Howard as Vernon "Ott" Mottley
- Richard Pelzman as Little Big Roy
- Jeffrey Pratt Gordon as Johnny "Fifty" Spamanto
- J. Valenteen Gregg as Chess

==== Uncredited appearances ====
- De'Rodd Hearns as Puddin
- Tray Chaney as Malik "Poot" Carr
- Luray Cooper as Nat Coxson
- Bill Heneghan as Maryland Port Authority Commander
- Kevin Jiggets as Frommers
- Lisa Bullock as Waitress
- Billy Finnigan as Bernard AKA "Fuzzy Dunlop"
- Dan Garrett as Gus the Bartender

== Reception ==
On its debut, "Duck and Cover" had nearly 3.64 million viewers and a 2.6 rating, ranked by Nielsen Media Research as the second most watched premium cable program of the week ending July 27, 2003. For The Star-Ledger, Alan Sepinwall commented that Jimmy McNulty is depicted "at his worst, and at close to his best, all in the course of an hour that manages to be more character-driven than usual".

Samuel Walters of Dauntless Media graded the episode with a C+ due to an excessive focus on Ziggy: "His antics are often cause for a bit of comic relief – which is certainly warranted in a serious series such as this....It’s so bizarre and offbeat that it doesn’t seem to be a natural fit for The Wire..."
