= Stray Rounds =

- The Wire episode
- Episode no.: Season 2 Episode 9
- Directed by: Tim Van Patten
- Story by: David Simon; Ed Burns
- Teleplay by: David Simon
- Original air date: July 27, 2003
- Running time: 58 minutes

Episode chronology
← Previous "Duck and Cover"	Next → "Storm Warnings"
- The Wire season 2

"Stray Rounds" is the ninth episode of the second season of the HBO original series The Wire. The episode was written by David Simon from a story by David Simon & Ed Burns and was directed by Tim Van Patten. It originally aired on July 27, 2003, with nearly three million viewers.

== Plot ==
The Sobotka detail is dismayed when they realize the smuggling ring has changed their operating procedures. Daniels assigns Herc and Carver to watch the warehouse as Bunk, Freamon, Prez, and Beadie man their remaining wiretaps. Valchek expresses his frustrations at a meeting with Rawls, Burrell, and Daniels that the investigation now involves more than his intended target of Frank Sobotka. Fitz agrees to look into Glekas but finds that his FBI file has been sealed by an Agent Koutris, who is working for the Greek and tips the Greek off about the focus on Glekas. Beadie sees a container go missing and Carver and Herc observe its arrival at the warehouse. McNulty infiltrates the brothel under his assumed identity of the British john. McNulty engages two prostitutes as he calls for the rest of the team to intervene. When they arrive and arrest the patrons they find McNulty having sex with them. McNulty writes a statement which is witnessed by an aghast Pearlman.

Vondas gently lets Nick know that his small orders of drugs do not require dealing with Eton and Vondas; the latter puts him in touch with White Mike to supply him with drugs and gives him a new list of clean containers to disappear. Vondas and Eton agree to get back to business importing drugs. During dinner, The Greek and his associates discuss the unreliability of their Colombian business partners. For revenge, The Greek leaks details of a huge Colombian cocaine shipment to Koutris, who makes the drug bust. Meanwhile, Bodie's crew is confronted by the competitors they previously chased off the corner. In the ensuing gunfight, a nine-year-old boy is killed by a stray bullet through his bedroom window. Stringer is angry that the drug trade will be disrupted by the killing, and has Bodie and Shamrock dispose of the weapons. However, when they throw the bag of guns over the side of the Hanover Street Bridge, it lands on the deck of a passing barge and is turned over to the police.

Colvin's district conducts a large-scale strike operation against drug dealers. Everyone in the pit is taken into custody in an attempt to glean information about who shot the child. Mello comments that they waited too long to do this, but Colvin asks what it is they think they are actually doing. Cole and Norris question Bodie, presenting the bagged weapons he failed to dispose of. Cole tells him they have matched his prints to a weapon, but Bodie quickly sees through the bluff and asks for his lawyer. Stringer lets Proposition Joe know that he accepts Joe's proposal that they pool their resources and share product and territory, making assurances that Avon will come around to the idea. Avon recruits Brother Mouzone, a feared hitman from New York, as muscle against rival dealers. Stringer tries to assure Joe that they have time to put their plan into action before Mouzone arrives, but Joe refuses to send any of his people up against him. Despite Stringer's hope that Mouzone would not arrive for a week or perhaps two, the hitman shows up the next day.

Ziggy drinks with Johnny Fifty and expresses a desire to get out of the drug business. When Nick arrives later, a drunk and distraught Ziggy tries to start a fight with him. In the bar, Nick discovers that Ziggy had accidentally killed his pet duck via alcohol poisoning. Ziggy meets with Glekas and offers him stolen cars from the docks to sell abroad. Glekas is initially reluctant but eventually agrees to give Ziggy a chance since it would be a good deal for him. Ziggy plans to create a track across the grass and a hole in the fence to take the cars through, making the theft look like an outside job.

== Production ==
=== Epigraph ===
The world is a smaller place now.

— The Greek

=== Credits ===
==== Starring cast ====
Although credited, Wood Harris does not appear in this episode.

==== Guest stars ====
1. Seth Gilliam as Detective Ellis Carver
2. Domenick Lombardozzi as Detective Thomas "Herc" Hauk
3. Jim True-Frost as Detective Roland "Prez" Pryzbylewski
4. Robert Wisdom as Major Howard "Bunny" Colvin
5. James Ransone as Ziggy Sobotka
6. Pablo Schreiber as Nick Sobotka
7. Tom Mardirosian as Agent Koutris
8. Michael Potts as Brother Mouzone
9. Bill Raymond as The Greek
10. Lev Gorens as Eton Ben-Eleazer
11. Michael Hyatt as Brianna Barksdale
12. J.D. Williams as Preston "Boadie" Broadus
13. Tray Chaney as Malik "Poot" Carr
14. Robert F. Chew as Proposition Joe
15. Luray Cooper as Nat Coxson
16. Kelvin Davis as La La
17. Chris Ashworth as Sergei Malatov
18. Al Brown as Major Stan Valchek
19. Doug Olear as Terrance "Fitz" Fitzhugh
20. Charley Scalies as Thomas "Horseface" Pakusa
21. Delaney Williams as Sergeant Jay Landsman
22. Ted Feldman as George "Double G" Glekas
23. Bus Howard as Vernon "Ott" Mottley
24. Ed Norris as Ed Norris
25. Gloria Phillips as bereaved mother

==== Uncredited appearances ====
- Jay Landsman as Lieutenant Dennis Mello
- Brook Yeaton as "White" Mike McArdle
- De'Rodd Hearns as Puddin
- Richard Burton as Shamrock
- Jeffrey Pratt Gordon as Johnny "Fifty" Spamanto
- Derren M. Fuentes as Lieutenant Torret
- Gil Deeble as Hucklebuck
- Gordana Rashovich as Ilona Petrovich
- Daniel Ferro as Police Officer
- Luke Montgomery III as young boy
- Randall Boffman as Bill Anderson - administrator for the port of Baltimore
- Jonas Grey as drug buyer

=== First appearances ===
- Howard "Bunny" Colvin: Commander of the Western District, seen at the scene of the child's shooting.
- Dennis Mello: Shift lieutenant in the Western District and Colvin's right-hand man.
- Brother Mouzone: New York hitman and drug enforcer who appears in a manner similar to Nation of Islam members.

== Reception ==
On its debut, "Stray Rounds" had 3.04 million viewers and a 2.1 rating, qualifying in Nielsen Media Research ratings as the third most watched premium cable show of the week ending August 3, 2003.

In a 2009 review for The Star-Ledger, Alan Sepinwall regarded Valchek insisting on targeting Frank Sobotka despite the police's success in opening cases against Sobotka's subordinates as one of the best scenes of the season: "Good work is damned hard to do, and if it doesn't help someone in power either stay in power or protect his own interests, then it doesn't really matter, does it?" Many characters were "victims of their own hubris, parochialism or plain stupidity," observed Saptarshi Ray for The Guardian. However, Samuel Walters of Dauntless Media graded the episode with a C+ in 2010 for an "overly simplistic portrayal of the upper echelons of the police force."
