= Ebb Tide (The Wire) =

- The Wire episode
- Episode no.: Season 2 Episode 1
- Directed by: Ed Bianchi
- Story by: David Simon; Ed Burns
- Teleplay by: David Simon
- Original air date: June 1, 2003
- Running time: 58 minutes

Episode chronology
← Previous "Sentencing"	Next → "Collateral Damage"
- The Wire season 2

"Ebb Tide" is the 14th episode of the American police drama series The Wire, also the first episode of the second season. It was written by David Simon, from a story by Simon and Ed Burns, and was directed by Ed Bianchi. The episode shows Jimmy McNulty adjusting to a new role with the Baltimore Police marine unit and introduces a group of dockworkers who turn to crime due to a lack of legitimate work opportunities. In the United States, the episode premiered June 1, 2003, on HBO.

The episode had over four million viewers on its debut. Critical reception was positive, especially regarding the character development and frank depiction of the American working class.

== Plot ==
A few months after his reassignment to the Baltimore Police Department's marine unit, Jimmy McNulty discovers a female corpse with broken legs floating in the harbor. He visits Homicide and checks in with Sergeant Jay Landsman, finding out that Colonel William Rawls passed the case off to Baltimore County because the body was found east of the Francis Scott Key Bridge. McNulty studies tide charts as he attempts to prove where the body was dumped into the water; he types up a report and faxes it to Baltimore County. Rawls and Landsman immediately realize McNulty's involvement when the case is passed back to them, his report proving the body actually went into the water west of the bridge and thus in the territory of Baltimore City.

Roland "Prez" Pryzbylewski meets with his father-in-law, Major Stan Valchek, wishing to stay in Narcotics and work cases like the recent Barksdale investigation. Valchek instead wants Prez to move up the ranks. At Narcotics, Kima Greggs is working a desk job and Thomas "Herc" Hauk has returned to street cases. Greggs and her girlfriend, Cheryl, discuss possible fathers for artificial insemination along with Greggs' job dissatisfaction. Bunk Moreland visits McNulty to ask if he can help him locate Omar Little for the upcoming murder trial of Barksdale soldier Marquis "Bird" Hilton. Bunk later has a chance meeting with Lieutenant Cedric Daniels, now in charge of the evidence room. That evening, Bunk again asks McNulty for help locating Omar, but to no avail.

Bodie Broadus drives to Philadelphia with another Barksdale dealer, Sean "Shamrock" McGinty. Bodie is enraged when the car he has collected is devoid of any narcotics and worries over informing his superiors. Stringer Bell, who now leads the Barksdale Organization while Avon Barksdale is imprisoned, reveals that he had Bodie and Shamrock followed. Bodie is later seen running a tower crew. Stringer visits Avon in prison, telling him that the Barksdales' connection with New York, Roberto, failed to deliver the product which Bodie was sent to collect. Stringer later learns that Roberto was arrested by the DEA and had become concerned that Avon implicated him in exchange for a lighter prison sentence. Stringer is assured that his funds are being returned to him, but that New York suppliers no longer feel safe dealing with the Barksdales.

At Locust Point, Frank Sobotka, the secretary-treasurer of a stevedores union, meets with fellow union leader Nat Coxson, who is angry that the Baltimore grain pier is still in a state of disrepair. The two disagree over lobbying tactics; Frank wishes to push for having the canal dredged, an ambitious and expensive project that will employ far more people than the grain pier alone, while Nat urges him to set his sights lower by focusing on rehabilitation of the grain pier.

Frank tells his nephew Nick to see someone named "The Greek" about a shipping container they have coming in. Frank confronts his son Ziggy over losing a container. Later, he visits a church where he has donated a stained glass window and asks the priest, Father Lewandowski, to set up a meeting with Senator Barbara Mikulski to discuss difficulties at the docks, including the grain pier. Valchek delivers his own window to the church but is angry that Frank's union beat him to it and apparently donated much more money to the church than the police and fire unions combined were able to. At Delores' bar, the stevedores riotously discuss days gone by. Ziggy shows off and exposes himself while standing on a table.

The following morning, Nick is met by Ziggy and Johnny Fifty on his way to meet with The Greek about the container and tells Frank that their cut will be the same. Frank and Thomas "Horseface" Pakusa are dismayed when Sergei "Serge" Malatov, The Greek's lieutenant, leaves the container sitting on the dock for several hours. When they insist that he get on with things, Sergei drives away. Frank orders Horseface to "lose" the container in the stack, so as to make it less conspicuous. Later, Maryland Transportation Authority Police officer Beadie Russell stumbles across the container and notices the broken customs seal. She finds the bodies of over a dozen young women inside and calls for backup. Frank and the stevedores gather around as the police arrive.

== Production ==
=== Starring cast ===
Paul Ben Victor, Clarke Peters, Amy Ryan, and Chris Bauer are all new additions to the opening credits this season. Credited stars Larry Gilliard, Jr., Deirdre Lovejoy, and Clarke Peters do not appear in this episode.

=== Guest stars ===
- Seth Gilliam as Detective Ellis Carver
- Domenick Lombardozzi as Detective Thomas "Herc" Hauk
- Jim True-Frost as Detective Roland "Prez" Pryzbylewski
- James Ransone as Ziggy Sobotka
- Pablo Schreiber as Nick Sobotka
- Al Brown as Major Stan Valchek
- Melanie Nicholls-King as Cheryl
- J. D. Williams as Preston "Bodie" Broadus
- Delaney Williams as Sergeant Jay Landsman
- Chris Ashworth as Sergei Malatov
- Luray Cooper as Nat Coxson
- Jeffrey Fugitt as Claude Diggins
- Bill Raymond as The Greek
- Ted Feldman as George "Double G" Glekas
- Tel Monks as Father Jerome Lewandowski
- The Nighthawks (Musical appearance)
- Elisabeth Noone as Joan Sobotka
- Charley Scalies as Thomas "Horseface" Pakusa

=== Uncredited appearances ===
- Jill Redding as Delores
- J. Valenteen Gregg as Chess
- Harold L. Able, Sr. as Moonshot
- Stan Stewart as New Charles
- Richard Pelzman as Little Big Roy
- Kelvin Davis as La La
- Bus Howard as Ott
- Doug Lory as Big Roy
- Jeffrey Pratt Gordon as Johnny "Fifty" Spamanto
- Robert F. Colesberry as Detective Ray Cole
- Jeffrey Coleman as Coast Guard Officer
- Richard Burton as Sean "Shamrock" McGinty
- De'Rodd Hearns as Puddin
- Addison Switzer as Country
- Perry Blackmon as Perry
- Rico Whelchel as Rico
- Jonathan D. Wray as Tank
- Unknown as Dominican Drug Lawyer

=== First appearances ===
==== The Port ====
- Frank Sobotka: International Brotherhood of Stevedores local 1514 checker's union secretary treasurer at the Baltimore port who is smuggling contraband to finance his political campaign to rejuvenate the docks.
- Nick Sobotka: Local 1514 stevedore and nephew of Frank Sobotka who acts as a messenger in his smuggling operation.
- Ziggy Sobotka: Son of Frank Sobotka and an incompetent stevedore at the port with aspirations of becoming a feared criminal.
- Horseface: Longstanding Polish Baltimore port checker and friend of Frank Sobotka who handles all of their smuggled containers.
- Nat Coxson: African American local 1514 stevedores union president who worries about Frank's surge in income.
- Ott: Senior African American stevedore, often found drinking at Delores' bar, who is set to replace Frank at the next election.
- Little Big Roy: Imposing Polish senior port stevedore who is often found drinking at Delores' bar.
- Chess: Large, bearded, senior, African American stevedore at Delores' bar.
- Moonshot: Smaller, bearded, senior, African American stevedore at Delores' bar.
- New Charles: Bald-headed African American Stevedore.
- Big Roy: Long-haired young Stevedore at Delores' bar.
- Johnny "Fifty" Spamanto: Young Baltimore port checker and friend to Nick and Ziggy Sobotka.
- La La: Younger African American Baltimore Port checker and friend to Nick Sobotka.
- Delores: Owner of the bar frequented by local 1514 union members.
- Joan Sobotka: Nick Sobotka's mother and Frank's sister-in-law.

==== The Greeks ====
- The Greek: Mysterious figure running smuggling in Baltimore from behind the scenes.
- Spiros "Vondas" Vondopoulos: The Greek's second in command and spokesman.
- Sergei Malatov: Driver and muscle for The Greek's smuggling operation. Ukrainian.
- George "Double G" Glekas: Warehouse front operator for The Greek's smuggling operation and fence.

==== Law Enforcement ====
- Officer Beatrice "Beadie" Russell: Inexperienced port authority police officer.
- Officer Claude Diggins: McNulty's new partner in the marine unit.
- This is the first episode where William Rawls is ranked as a colonel.

==== Barksdale organization ====
- Sean "Shamrock" McGinty: Barksdale crew lieutenant who drives Bodie to Philadelphia and is Stringer Bell's new second in command.
- Country: Recently paroled Barksdale soldier who tails Bodie to Philadelphia.
- Tank: Barksdale soldier who accompanies Country.
- Puddin: Bodie's second at his new tower drug dealing operation.
- Rico: Barksdale enforcer who acts as security at the funeral home.

== Broadcast ==
The episode debuted on HBO on June 1, 2003. A repeat broadcast on BET in April 2007 attracted attention for shortening or removing scenes of the dockworkers story.

== Reception ==
On its debut, "Ebb Tide" had 4.43 million viewers with a 2.8 share, ranking eighth in the Nielsen Media Research U.S. cable television ratings for the week of May 26 to June 1, 2003.

Critical reception of the episode was largely positive, especially regarding the depiction of working-class Americans and character development. New York Daily News critic David Hinckley rated this episode three out of four stars and praised the depth of the cast: "Unlike shows where the peripheral characters must become caricatures so they don't distract viewers from the stars, everyone in 'The Wire' has a tale." For The Baltimore Sun, David Zurawik found the episode to be a "transition from housing projects to waterfront...made gracefully" and "a groundbreaking exploration of life in working-class America." Zurawik also compared the depiction of working-class people in The Wire season 2 to the 1980 drama Skag and 1990s sitcom Roseanne on television and The Deer Hunter on film.

Similarly, Alan Sepinwall of The Star-Ledger said of this episode: "It's not a crime show. There's a lot of crime in it, yes, but it's a story about the death of an American city...and little by little the show is going to take us into every corner of that city." Bret McCabe of Baltimore City Paper also saw the dockworker plot to be such a rarity that only On the Waterfront was a comparable film. Robert Bianco of USA Today praised the episode for showing "the absurdity and pettiness that exist on both sides of the criminal battle lines" and the church window subplot: "Only in a show this clever could the plot hinge on a fight between a cop and a dock worker over which group gets to be immortalized in stained glass in a church", in a review grading the show four out of four stars. For the San Jose Mercury News, Charlie McCollum rated the season three and a half out of four stars for "a true-to-life portrayal of life on the mean streets" not found elsehwere on TV. Alessandra Stanley had a mild criticism of the plot development commenting in The New York Times that the episode was paced "abstrusely" while praising the development of minor characters as "more layered and intriguing as the story unfolds."

San Francisco Chronicle critic Tim Goodman praised the plot and character depth while acknowledging "new viewers will also have no idea why this collection of detectives is stewing in their fate."

John Plotz, professor of English at Brandeis University, observed in a New York Times essay that the scene of Bodie and Shamrock feeling surprised that they cannot receive Baltimore radio stations on a long drive to show characters "so hemmed in by segregation and lack of opportunity that they have no idea how trapped they are." McCollum of the San Jose Mercury News cited that radio scene as a rare humorous moment on the show.
