= Time After Time (The Wire) =

- The Wire episode
- Episode no.: Season 3 Episode 1
- Directed by: Ed Bianchi
- Story by: David Simon; Ed Burns
- Teleplay by: David Simon
- Original air date: September 19, 2004
- Running time: 58 minutes

Episode chronology
← Previous "Port in a Storm"	Next → "All Due Respect"
- The Wire season 3

"Time After Time" is the 26th episode of the American crime drama The Wire and the first episode of the show's third season. The episode was written by David Simon from a story by David Simon & Ed Burns and was directed by Ed Bianchi. It originally aired September 19, 2004, on HBO in the U.S. This episode introduces a new storyline involving the Baltimore Police surveilling drug dealer Cheese Wagstaff, with a subplot about the Barksdale Organization considering new territory due to the upcoming demolition of its former gathering spot at a public housing project.

On its debut, "Time After Time" had nearly 1.83 million viewers; Nielsen Media Research ranked it the most popular program on U.S. premium cable for the week. Entertainment Weekly and The New York Times provided positive reviews of this episode.

== Plot ==
Detectives Jimmy McNulty and Leander Sydnor monitor drug lieutenant Melvin "Cheese" Wagstaff. At the Major Case Unit, Lester Freamon, Roland "Prez" Pryzbylewski and new member Caroline Massey monitor a wiretap. Sydnor observes that Cheese does not use a phone, instead conducting his business face-to-face and receiving phone messages through his subordinate. After being relieved by Freamon and Kima Greggs, McNulty is told by ASA Rhonda Pearlman and Lieutenant Cedric Daniels that they are considering the abandonment of the wire. McNulty, believing the wire will eventually reach Proposition Joe and Stringer Bell, heatedly asserts that Bell is their target and that all other objectives are secondary. Daniels insists they need a break in the case to justify continued use of the wiretaps.

McNulty, Greggs and Freamon observe a dealer named Drac, who is far less discreet on the phone than Cheese's crew. Freamon states that Drac is supplied by Lavelle Mann, one of Joe's soldiers. They plan to arrest Mann in the hope that Drac, Joe's nephew, will be promoted and give them more information on the organization through his careless talk on the wire. Daniels takes the plan to Acting Commissioner Ervin Burrell, who is reluctant to fund more wiretaps. Burrell later reports to Daniels that Mayor Clarence Royce is now holding up the proposal to promote Daniels to the position of Major because Daniels' wife Marla is set to challenge one of the mayor's allies in an upcoming election.

McNulty goes to an Orioles game with his old partner Bunk Moreland. He meets his estranged wife Elena to take his children for the second half. Despite it being his day off, Bunk is forced to leave the game early when he is called to work a murder scene. The following day, Daniels marshals his men for the hand-to-hand on Mann. Once out in the field, Greggs and McNulty make a clean arrest. Drac immediately starts talking about a possible promotion on the wire. Unfortunately for the detail, the promotion goes to Cheese instead. At midnight, Prez finds McNulty reviewing old files from the Barksdale investigation.

In the Western District, Sergeant Ellis Carver marshals his new squad and plans a sting on a corner drug dealing operation. He and Thomas "Herc" Hauk eventually chase down a runner named Tyrell. When Carver and Herc bring Tyrell in with no evidence for a drug charge, Colvin criticizes their use of resources. Later, as he prepares to patrol the Western, he is disappointed to see that Carver's squad has brought in more street dealers on loitering charges with no leads into their distributors. Colvin further sees the urban decay blighting the neighborhood thanks to rampant crime.

Bodie Broadus, Poot Carr and Puddin reminisce about the Barksdale towers, which are being demolished. Bell chairs a meeting to discuss the Barksdales' new direction now that their main territory is lost; Bodie suggests that they take new territory by force. Bell instead suggests that they supply other dealers with their product rather than battle over territory, urging his subordinates to think like businessmen. Meanwhile, in prison, Wee-Bey Brice talks to former Barksdale soldier Dennis "Cutty" Wise, who is about to be paroled. Avon Barksdale asks Cutty for help securing new territory and gives him a number to call when he is released. Once outside, Cutty arranges a meeting with Shamrock and is given directions to a package of narcotics. Cutty observes one of Marlo Stanfield's crews and strikes a deal with the leader, Fruit, to work the package for a share of the profit. When Cutty returns later that night, Fruit tells him his stash was confiscated by police and drives him away with a gun.

Bubbles and Johnny lose control of their cart, which crashes into the car of Marlo's driver. He takes their trousers as punishment. Elsewhere, Royce delivers a speech at the demolition ceremony for the towers. Councilmember Tommy Carcetti grills Burrell and Deputy Commissioner William Rawls about increased violent crime in East Baltimore during a review meeting. Burrell meets with Royce and his chief of staff, Coleman Parker, who speculates Carcetti is preparing to run for mayor. Royce dismisses Carcetti's chances of winning in a majority-black city, but Parker is concerned he could use rising crime figures to his advantage. Royce and Parker pressure Burrell to have the Baltimore Police reduce violent crime citywide by 5% in each district and keep murders under 275 for the year.

At the next ComStat meeting, Burrell tells his men to cut the felony rate by Royce's figures. Colonel Raymond Foerster, now in charge of the CID, is dismayed at the directive. Colvin realizes how the commanders have been encouraged to water down their figures and questions how they could "juke the stats" with murder victims. Burrell threatens to replace commanders who fail to deliver the figures he wants. Later, Daniels attends a meeting at his home with State Delegate Odell Watkins and Marla's other political contacts. Once they have left, Marla thanks him and he returns to sleep at the office.

== Production ==
=== Epigraph ===
Don't matter how many times you get burnt, you just keep doin' the same.

— Bodie

=== Credits ===
==== Starring cast ====
Aidan Gillen, Robert Wisdom, Seth Gilliam, Domenick Lombardozzi, Jim True-Frost, Corey Parker Robinson, J. D. Williams, and Michael K. Williams are all new additions to the opening credits this season. Aidan Gillen is new to the series while the other actors have all previously appeared as guest stars. Robert Wisdom first appeared as Howard "Bunny" Colvin in a guest starring role in the second season episode "Stray Rounds." Corey Parker Robinson had a recurring role as Leander Sydnor in the first season but did not appear in the second season. Jim True-Frost (Roland "Prez" Pryzbylewski), Seth Gilliam (Ellis Carver), Domenick Lombardozzi (Thomas "Herc" Hauk), J. D. Williams (Bodie Broadus), and Michael K. Williams (Omar Little) all had significant recurring roles in the first two seasons. Although credited, Michael K. Williams does not appear in this episode.

==== Guest stars ====
1. Glynn Turman as Mayor Clarence Royce
2. Callie Thorne as Elena McNulty
3. Chad L. Coleman as Dennis "Cutty" Wise
4. Jamie Hector as Marlo Stanfield
5. Tray Chaney as Malik "Poot" Carr
6. Hassan Johnson as Roland "Wee-Bey" Brice
7. Method Man as Calvin "Cheese" Wagstaff
8. Maria Broom as Marla Daniels
9. Leo Fitzpatrick as Johnny
10. Joilet F. Harris as Officer Caroline Massey
11. Al Brown as Major Stanislaus Valchek
12. Jay Landsman as Lieutenant Dennis Mello
13. Ed Norris as Ed Norris
14. Richard Burton as Sean "Shamrock" McGinty
15. Brandon Fobbs as Fruit
16. Anwan Glover as Slim Charles
17. De'Rodd Hearns as Puddin
18. DeJuan Anderson as Bunk Junior
19. Anthony Cordova as Sean McNulty
20. Eric G. Ryan as Michael McNulty
21. Tony D. Head as Major Bobby Reed
22. Benjamin Busch as Officer Anthony Colicchio
23. Christopher Mann as Councilman Tony Gray
24. Frederick Strother as State Delegate Odell Watkins
25. Cleo Reginald Pizana as Chief of Staff Coleman Parker

==== Uncredited appearances ====
- Justin Burley as Justin
- Lee E. Cox as Aaron Castor
- Richard DeAngelis as Colonel Raymond Foerster
- Nakia Dillard as Lambert
- Mustafa Harris as Lavell Mann
- Derek Horton as Brian Baker
- Barnett Lloyd as Major Marvin Taylor
- Robert Neal Marshall as Comstat Police Major
- Keith Moyer as Junk Man
- Rick Otto as Kenneth Dozerman
- Melvin T Russell as Jamal
- Ryan Sands as Truck
- Rico Sterling as Tyrell
- Addison Switzer as Country
- Rico Whelchel as Rico
- Jonathan D. Wray as Tank
- Esley Tate as Boo
- Unknown as Dennis Carpenter (Elena's boyfriend)
- Unknown as Drac
- Unknown as Tote

=== First appearances ===
==== Police department ====
- Off. Caroline Massey: Veteran Western district officer with an ear for street slang who has joined the major case unit.
- Anthony Colicchio, Dozerman, Lambert and Truck: Drug enforcement unit officers working in Sergeant Carver's squad in the Western district.
- Patrolmen Castor and Baker: African American Rookie Western district beat officers whom Major Colvin criticizes over their sense of direction and consequently forces to carry compasses.
- Major Marvin Taylor: Baltimore Eastern District commander.
- This is the first episode in which William Rawls appears as Deputy Commissioner of Operations a.k.a. Deputy Ops.

==== Politicians ====
This episode introduced Baltimore city politicians as characters. The Baltimore Sun reported on September 27, 2004, that the new season led to speculation in Baltimore political circles that these characters were based on real-life politicians.

- Clarence Royce: Longstanding Mayor of Baltimore who is more concerned with keeping power than effecting change.
- Tommy Carcetti: Ambitious city councilman lining up for a run at the mayor's seat. The Baltimore Sun claimed that Carcetti was based on Baltimore city councilmember Nicholas C. D'Adamo Jr. and mayor Martin O'Malley, but series creator David Simon disputed that there was any connection, while council member Keiffer Mitchell Jr. did see similarities with O'Malley regarding criticism of the Baltimore police.
- Anthony Gray: Councilman and friend and colleague to Tommy Carcetti.
- State Delegate Odell Watkins: Maryland politician and chief supporter of Marla Daniels.
- Chief of Staff Coleman Parker: Mayor Royce's chief of staff and trusted adviser.

==== Drug dealers ====
- Marlo Stanfield: Up and coming, extremely ruthless Westside drug kingpin.
- Tote: Volatile lieutenant in the Stanfield Organization.
- Fruit: Kangol hat wearing Stanfield crew chief.
- Justin: Dopey young Stanfield drug dealer with a sideways cap.
- Jamal: Laconic second in Fruit's crew.
- Boo: Asthmatic drug dealer in Fruit's crew.
- Dennis "Cutty" Wise: Recently paroled former enforcer in Barksdale organization trying to stay straight.
- Slim Charles: Primary enforcer in the Barksdale organization.
- Drac: Nephew of Proposition Joe and an undisciplined crew chief in his organization.
- Lavelle Mann: Trusted lieutenant to Proposition Joe.

== Broadcast ==
This episode debuted on September 19, 2004, on U.S. premium cable channel HBO. Its 9 p.m. (Eastern Time) timeslot, critics noted, was at the same time as the 56th Primetime Emmy Awards. In the UK, "Time After Time" was first shown on January 17, 2006, on FX.

The first four episodes of The Wire season three were made available for critics prior to HBO broadcast.

== Reception ==
"Time After Time" had nearly 1.83 million viewers on its debut, leading the Nielsen Media Research U.S. premium cable ratings for the week ending September 19, 2004.

Critical reviews were mostly positive. In a preview of season three for Entertainment Weekly, Ken Tucker praised The Wire as "TV's richest, most satisfying experience" and added that the show "explores race, class, and politics without falling back on the pop-culture pieties and conventions of how blacks should be presented." New York Times critic Caryn James cited this episode's scene of Stringer Bell citing Robert's Rules of Order in a meeting as "bizarrely funny" and an example of "the show's sporadic, off-kilter humor". Saptarshi Ray of The Guardian praised the character development of Stringer Bell: "As his desire to go straight and become accepted in the social elite of Baltimore grows, his credibility among his own troops begins to wane." Matt Roush of TV Guide praised The Wire for avoiding "formula, of melodrama, of tidy resolution or comfort-food security" in contrast to most network TV crime shows.

Tim Goodman of the San Francisco Chronicle acknowledged this episode would be challenging for viewers who had never watched previous seasons. While conceding the episode was "somewhat murky", Goodman also praised the acting and writing: "The dramatic performances are off the charts, the humor is lethal and that bleak view of humanity -- that downward spiral of life being ground down one day at a time -- yep, still intact." Charlie McCollum of the San Jose Mercury News rated the episode four out of four stars and considered it an example of "compelling storytelling and crisp dialogue" early in season three.

For the Baltimore City Paper, Bret McCabe called this episode "quicker and sharper right out of the gate" and considered season three to be "one of the most complex portraits of a city in popular culture today." Similarly, Alan Sepinwall commented in 2010: "...the wonderful thing about 'The Wire' is the way that [David] Simon, Ed Burns and everyone else never let the show descend into a simple political screed. 'Time After Time,' as with all the show's episodes, features a lot of anger, but it's anger wrapped up in some very finely-crafted entertainment."
