= Prezbo =

Prezbo or PrezBo may refer to:

- Lee Bollinger, president of Columbia University from 2002 to 2023.
- Roland "Prez" Pryzbylewski, a fictional character from the HBO drama The Wire.
