= Clay Davis =

Character from The Wire

R. Clayton Davis
- The Wire character
- Isiah Whitlock Jr. as Clay Davis
- First appearance: "One Arrest" (2002)
- Last appearance: "Late Editions" (2008)
- Created by: David Simon
- Portrayed by: Isiah Whitlock Jr.

In-universe information
- Gender: Male
- Occupation: Maryland State Senator

R. Clayton "Clay" Davis is a fictional character on the HBO drama The Wire, played by actor Isiah Whitlock Jr. Davis is a corrupt Maryland State Senator with a reputation for pocketing bribes. However, throughout the series Davis remains protected by other ranking politicians and Baltimore Police Commissioner Ervin Burrell.

Davis is known for his idiosyncratic profanity, often when confronted with bad news, comically elongating the word shit as sheeeeeeeee-it.

== Storylines ==
=== Season 1 ===
When Lt. Cedric Daniels' detail discovers $20,000 belonging to Baltimore drug lord Avon Barksdale in the car of Davis's driver, Damien Price, they try to expand the wiretap-based investigation to include Davis. Deputy Commissioner Ervin Burrell calls Daniels into a private meeting with Davis, pressuring him into excluding the senator's alleged involvement. However, Daniels is unwilling to drop the case. Nevertheless, Burrell pulls the plug on the investigation, and Davis's involvement is effectively left buried. However, it is mentioned that Davis has a reputation for taking bribes, and has been under federal investigation for the last two years.

=== Season 2 ===
Davis attends a Democratic Party fundraiser thrown by stevedore union leader Frank Sobotka, accepting contributions in return for assurances that he will vote to construct the granary pier that Sobotka believes will help revitalize the union. After the press reports on criminal activities within the union, Sobotka's lobbyist advises him that none of the politicians—including Davis, presumably—will follow through. Davis is later seen at the groundbreaking ceremony for a dockside condominium being built on the site of the proposed granary pier.

=== Season 3 ===
Davis acts as a consultant for Stringer Bell, taking bribes from the Barksdale Organization while claiming to win state government contracts for the drug empire's legitimate business front, B&B. However, Bell becomes suspicious when he learns that block grants have been given to several city developers instead of B&B. Maurice Levy, Bell's lawyer, concludes that Davis has "rain made" Bell; the senator has played off Stringer's inexperience in legitimate business, taking the money and doing nothing in return. Stringer, furious, tells Slim Charles that he wants him to assassinate Davis, but Barksdale warns him that murdering a public figure will bring too much unwanted attention from the authorities.

=== Season 4 ===
Davis acts as Mayor Clarence Royce's deputy campaign chairman, and is a key fundraiser in his re-election campaign. When Detective Leander Sydnor serves a subpoena for Davis's financial records as part of the Major Crimes Unit's ongoing investigation into the Barksdale Organization's finances, the senator is outraged. In retaliation, he goes to Royce and threatens to cut off the campaign's funding unless Royce interferes with the subpoenas.

The day before the mayoral primary, Davis approaches candidate Tommy Carcetti, offering to hold off on bringing out the vote for Royce in exchange for a $20,000 payment. On Election Day, Davis campaigns for the mayor as if his offer to Carcetti had not taken place. After Carcetti defeats Royce, Davis explains that Royce gave more money, pointing out that he could easily have fleeced Carcetti for even more.

Davis strikes a deal with City Council President Nerese Campbell, offering a $25,000 jump in salary to a replacement commissioner in an attempt to appear as if Carcetti is an ally while believing the amount insufficient to attract any serious candidate. Davis is especially motivated to help Burrell when he learns that the most likely replacement is Daniels, whom he regards as too uncontrollable. Davis opposes Daniels's potential appointment based on his attitude regarding Price.

He realizes that Daniels may continue investigations into Davis's alleged money laundering. Davis convinces Campbell and Burrell that Daniels is more interested in serving Carcetti and is unwilling to be of use to the city's black community. To keep Daniels from being promoted, Davis agrees with Burrell's plans to present information regarding illegal activities from Daniels' past.

=== Season 5 ===
Davis becomes a target of prosecution for State's Attorney Rupert Bond following the MCU investigation. Detectives Sydnor and Lester Freamon are assigned to Bond's unit to lead the investigation at his behest following the rest of the unit's reassignment. Davis approaches Burrell and demands that he stop the investigation. Burrell explains that he would have to go around Daniels to interfere in the case and that acting against Daniels would put him in conflict with Bond and Mayor Carcetti. As a result, Davis and Burrell have a falling-out.

Meanwhile, Assistant State's Attorney Rhonda Pearlman begins a series of grand jury depositions to prepare evidence against Davis, with one of the key witnesses being Price. Learning that Carcetti has planned to replace Burrell, Davis offers to use his connections to smooth the transitions in exchange for help with the case; Carcetti refuses.

Having uncovered evidence that Davis lied on a mortgage application, Freamon and Sydnor suggest taking the case to federal law enforcement. However, Bond elects to ignore the evidence, hoping to gain recognition by prosecuting Davis himself. Called to testify, Davis invokes his Fifth Amendment rights to avoid incriminating himself. Davis confronts a press opportunity staged by Bond on the courthouse steps, turning on the charm and denying any wrongdoing.

When called to the stand in his own defense, Davis gives a rousing speech defending his public role, claiming the money he took from public funds was his attempt to help constituents and cut through red tape. The jury acquits him, and Davis beams before the assembled cameras and reporters afterward while Bond and Pearlman look on, unable to believe what they have just witnessed. Freamon brings the evidence relating to the mortgage application to federal law enforcement anyways, but they reject the case because the acquittal has caused the public to perceive Davis as a civil rights leader unjustly persecuted by the government.

With Bond's case concluded but the mortgage fraud uncharged, Freamon approaches Davis in a bar with the incriminating mortgage paperwork. Not knowing that Freamon has been unable to bring these charges, Davis gives up information about back-room deals involving the city's political elite, including dirt on Levy's leakage of court documents to drug dealers. In a second conversation, Davis is last seen giving Freamon additional information, as well as boasting about conning Stringer.

== Production ==
=== Origins ===
Creator David Simon has said that Clay Davis is based on three politicians in the Maryland State Senate, and that his affectionate use of the word "partner" is based on one of them, saying that everybody in Baltimore knows who this is.

In an essay in the official series guide The Wire: Truth Be Told, William Zorzi implies that Davis is patterned on former Maryland State Senator Larry Young.

=== Mannerisms ===
The character is well known for his elongated pronouncement of the word "shit" as "sheeeeeeeee-it". This mannerism originated with Whitlock's uncle, from whom Whitlock picked up the habit. It is featured in the films 25th Hour (2002) and BlacKkKlansman (2018), after Spike Lee encouraged him to use it. It is also featured in the TV series Suits between characters Mike Ross and Katrina Bennett. When Whitlock received his first script for The Wire it was already written into the part. Davis is also known to speak differently depending on his company: he freely uses black vernacular when among Black people but adjusts his speech to sound "whiter" when dealing with his (largely) white business partners.
