= Kristin Proctor =

Norwegian-American actress (born 1978)

- Born: April 16, 1978 (age 47); Los Angeles, California, U.S.
- Citizenship: American; Norwegian
- Education: Harvard University (AB)
- Occupation: Actress
- Years active: 2001–present
- Father: Philip Proctor

Kristin Proctor (born April 16, 1978) is a Norwegian-American actress. She is the daughter of actor Philip Proctor and television producer Barbro Semmingsen.

== Early life and education ==
Born in Los Angeles, Proctor grew up in Norway and made her debut, aged eight, on Norwegian television. She graduated from the Institute for Advanced Theater Training at Harvard University in 2000.

== Career ==
Proctor played Nina in Anton Chekhov's The Seagull. She went on to appear opposite Debra Winger in an American Repertory Theater production of Ivanov. She has performed on stage in Dublin, Oslo, London, New York, Boston and Los Angeles.

Proctor's first film role was in Riding in Cars with Boys. She has subsequently appeared in TV shows such as CSI: NY, Numb3rs, NCIS, All My Children, and The Wire.

== Filmography ==
=== Film ===
Year	Title	Role	Notes
2001	Riding in Cars with Boys	Cindy	
2008	La Mesa	Nancy	
2010	Gunfight at La Mesa	Nancy	

=== Television ===
Year	Title	Role	Notes
2003	The Wire	Aimee	6 episodes
2004, 2006	Entourage	Wimmer's Assistant / Julie	2 episodes
2005	NCIS	Susan Ellsworth	Episode: "An Eye for an Eye"
2005	Numbers	Sheriff's Deputy	Episode: "Toxin"
2006	CSI: NY	Tracy Colton	Episode: "Wasted"
2006	The Young and the Restless		Episode #1.8497
2007	Cold Case	Maggie Lafferty	Episode: "Justice"
2008	Medium	Wife	Episode: "Partners in Crime"
