= Beadie Russell =

Character from The Wire

Beatrice Russell
- The Wire character
- Amy Ryan as Beadie Russell
- First appearance: "Ebb Tide" (2003)
- Last appearance: "–30–" (2008)
- Created by: David Simon
- Portrayed by: Amy Ryan

In-universe information
- Alias: Beadie
- Gender: Female
- Occupation: Port Authority police officer
- Spouse: Unnamed ex-husband
- Children: Jack (son); Cary (daughter)

Beatrice "Beadie" Russell is a fictional character on the HBO drama The Wire, played by actress Amy Ryan. She was featured prominently in the second season, after she discovered thirteen corpses in a container on the Baltimore docks.

== Character storyline ==
=== Background ===
Russell is introduced into the series as a port authority officer, a job that she's been doing for two years. She took the job because she needed the pay to support her two young children after her husband abandoned them. Before her appointment, she worked collecting tolls, which did not provide a decent income. Russell's parents often help her with the kids.

She found the job unchallenging and spent most of her time patrolling the docks and checking shipping manifests. She developed a friendly working relationship with many of the stevedores, including Frank Sobotka, though she was kept out of the loop regarding major criminal activities within the stevedore's union because of the Port Authority's lack of manpower.

=== Season 2 ===
In season two, Russell notices a broken customs seal on a container while on patrol and searches the container, finding a hidden compartment filled with thirteen dead bodies of young women. She is briefly the primary investigator until Officer Jimmy McNulty intervened after noticing that the air vent in the container had been beaten shut, getting the case reassigned to the city Homicide Unit and also noticing that the Port Authority lacked the necessary resources to investigate the possible murders.

McNulty had previously fished out a fourteenth body while working for the Marine Unit, which was an obvious murder. McNulty largely proceeds with his intervention to spite Major Rawls, who sent him to the marine unit as a punishment in Season 1. Russell is subsequently detailed to Homicide to aid in the investigation. Initially she shows her lack of experience and street knowledge, but she develops some latent talent for police work while working alongside veteran homicide detectives Bunk Moreland and Lester Freamon.

Russell moves into Lieutenant Daniels' detail after he agrees to investigate the bodies, where she soon fends off an awkward advance from Herc. The detail is formed to investigate irregularities in the stevedores union's assets, suggesting theft of products from containers and possible ties with contraband and human trafficking, tying the initial detail against union leader Frank Sobotka, fueled by Commander Valchek due to a petty feud with Sobotka, with the investigation regarding the dead women inside the container, fueled by Major Rawls and Deputy Commissioner Burrell.

Her home life makes it difficult for her to work the long hours necessary for the investigation, but she perseveres. She connects with detective Kima Greggs while discussing the balance of a mother's responsibilities and the dangers inherent in their work, and enjoys flirting with McNulty both during work and while drinking after hours. McNulty visits Russell's house one night, but he feels uncomfortable with the presence of family photos and children's toys, and leaves before a more intimate relationship develops.

Russell's familiarity with the people and organization of the port proves invaluable to the investigation. She taps Maui, an old boyfriend in Frank Sobotka's union, to find out more about illegal activity in the port. Although Maui does not directly give her any information, his suggestion that all the information the Police need is on the port's computer leads the detail to clone the port's container traffic computer system, allowing them to monitor all traffic on and off of ships.

In an attempt to throw Sobotka off of any possible suspicion, Russell dons her Port Authority uniform once more and approaches Sobotka to reassure him that she is no longer detailed in the investigation.

When a suspicious Sobotka sends out a truck carrying normal goods to test the waters, Russell inadvertently tips the investigation's hand by having her colleagues in the port authority stop it. Frank later checks with other port officers who tell him she is still working with the detail, contrary to what she previously told him, and confirming his suspicions that he is being investigated. Despite these mis-steps, Russell gains the respect of the officers in the Sobotka detail.

At the end of their investigation, when the focus shifts past Sobotka, Russell is entrusted with following Spiros "Vondas" Vondopoulos to a key meeting with The Greek. She comes through, delivering the location of the meeting, and enables the surveillance crew to get a photograph of Vondas and his lawyer. The detail loses Vondas' trail.

Russell is able to convince Frank Sobotka to inform on The Greek once a strong case is built against him. Her emotional offer of a deal has Frank ready to give up everything he knows in order to help his family. Sobotka does meet with the officers and DA so he can give a statement, but he approaches without legal representation, so he agrees to meet the next day. His nephew Nick approaches him with an offer from Vondas to help his recently convicted son Ziggy from a murder charge.

Before Sobotka meets with Vondas, The Greek is tipped off with Sobotka's collaboration with the detail through an FBI mole, so they slit Sobotka's throat and dump him in the bay. His corpse is found by the Marine Unit and placed in the port, where all his stevedore union peers and his nephew Nicky gather to see. The detail is informed of the demise and Russell witnesses her former friend's mortal remains with great grief.

Through the collaboration of Nick after the murder of his uncle, the detail is able to identify The Greek and through the capture and collaboration of The Greek's enforcer Sergei Malatov, they are able to pursue both Vondas and The Greek, only missing them by a matter of hours. With several arrests made, the murder of the girls solved by Malatov's collaboration, and the voluntary dissolution of the stevedore's union due to the scandal and the violence involved, Russell returns to her work at the Port.

=== Season 3 / Season 4 ===
In 2004, Matt Roush of TV Guide responded to a reader question about Amy Ryan's absence from season three: "...unless they transferred her to the wire unit full-time, her presence would have to be shoehorned in unrealistically."

In Season three, McNulty is reminded of Russell and, feeling his life is missing something, he reinitiates their relationship and returns to beat police work. By season four, the two are living together and McNulty has overcome many of his personal demons (which he credits to Beadie's influence). Beadie's children Jack and Cary have become fond of McNulty, even referring to him as just "McNulty". Beadie has now dyed her hair blonde.

=== Season 5 ===
By the first episode of season 5, McNulty is lying about late nights at work to cover his drinking and womanizing. Despite leaving him briefly, the two are reconciled by the end of the season: she is last seen sitting with McNulty on her doorstep watching the moon, with her head on his shoulder.
