= Rhonda Pearlman =

Character from The Wire

- The Wire character
- Deirdre Lovejoy as Rhonda Pearlman
- First appearance: "The Target" (2002)
- Last appearance: "–30–" (2008)
- Created by: David Simon
- Portrayed by: Deirdre Lovejoy

In-universe information
- Alias: Ronnie
- Gender: Female
- Title: Baltimore City Judge
- Occupation: Prosecutor; Judge; Assistant State's Attorney
- Nationality: American

Rhonda Pearlman is a fictional character on the HBO drama The Wire, played by actress Deirdre Lovejoy. Pearlman has been the legal system liaison for all of Lieutenant Cedric Daniels' investigations on the show. Later in the series, she begins a relationship with Cedric Daniels.

== Biography ==
As an Assistant State's Attorney in the narcotics division, Pearlman is a legal presence through all of the wiretap detail's investigations. A prosecutor and a stickler for process, Pearlman's grasp of the nuance of surveillance law and the legalities of complex casework is used in the investigations of the Barksdales, Sobotkas, and Stanfields. She is ambitious and often worries about the political implications of the casework.

As the seasons progress, she becomes more obsessed with her own success, and willing to cut legal and moral corners in order to advance her career. She once had a soft spot for Jimmy McNulty, leading to an on-again-off-again affair that was eventually discovered by McNulty's wife and ultimately contributed to the breakup of the McNultys' marriage. Although McNulty was honest enough to give Pearlman no hint of a future together, he would occasionally show up drunk on her doorstep. This ended when Pearlman's relationship with Daniels began.

=== Season 1 ===
Pearlman is the ASA heading the Narcotics cases in Season 1, assisting Lieutenant Cedric Daniels' detail in prosecuting the Barksdale Organization, a violent drug crew whom Detective Jimmy McNulty suspects of beating the Baltimore Homicide Unit out of 10 murders. She appears telling Daniels to "make lemonade" with the lack of quality police investigators he has been given, and appears as the liaison between the detail and judge Daniel Phelan on legal matters. She approves the unit's level of "exhaustion" of conventional means – a requirement to authorize a wiretap – helping them make a case against Avon Barksdale. Throughout the season, she has a sexual relationship with McNulty.

When Detective Lester Freamon begins piecing together the Barksdale Organization’s money trail, several developers and politicians are implicated, and Pearlman's boss, Steven Demper, becomes interested in the case. As the State's Attorney for Baltimore City, Demper is more interested in his elected position than quality prosecutions and threatens Pearlman's job.

When Avon Barksdale's nephew D'Angelo is arrested for drug possession, Pearlman and McNulty try to squeeze D'Angelo into a witness protection program. The attempt fails when D'Angelo's mother Brianna Barksdale intervenes, and Avon gets a lighter prison sentence.

=== Season 2 ===
Pearlman continues her casual relationship with McNulty, but is not as involved with an investigation run by Daniels, due to the lack of drug cases. As McNulty is attempting to rebuild his marriage and cope with his unwanted posting to the Marine Unit, he and Pearlman end their relationship.

When Daniels' now-permanent Major Case Unit investigates Frank Sobotka and The Greek's illegal activities at the port, Pearlman sees the opportunity to prosecute a large-scale drug-smuggling operation. The detail, along with the FBI, manages to arrest Sobotka and other drug dealers connected to The Greek, and Pearlman tries to negotiate testimony from Frank Sobotka and an Eastside Drug Dealer named "White Mike" McArdle based on their cooperation with the FBI and BPD. The case hits a dead end when The Greek's inside man in the FBI, Ernst Koutris, leaks information about Sobotka's cooperation, and Sobotka is subsequently murdered.

=== Season 3 ===
Pearlman is the first to notice that Daniels is sleeping in the detail office, having separated from his wife. Pearlman makes a pass at Daniels, beginning a relationship that continues throughout the season. Daniels, however, is skeptical about making their relationship public, as he is still posing as Marla's husband in order to help her bid for city council. Daniels believes that it will look bad for Marla's political career if he is seen to be separated from her and with a white woman.

The detail is now chasing a drug dealer, Kintel Williamson, who is suspected in a number of murders, a task that annoys McNulty. In the meantime, Avon Barksdale is granted parole for implicating a dirty guard in a drug smuggling ring, despite Pearlman's recommendation to the contrary. When McNulty links a number of murders to Stringer Bell, the detail changes targets back to Stringer and the Barksdale Organization. The detail sees disposable cell phones are being used, and Pearlman and Daniels go to the wireless provider, but find them to be unhelpful, even after threatening them with bad publicity. Eventually, Pearlman relies on Daniels to use his FBI connections to get a wiretap.

As soon as the wiretap goes up, Stringer Bell is murdered, but not before providing information to Major Colvin, which is then passed on to the detail. The information identifies Avon Barksdale's safehouse allowing Pearlman to sign a search warrant, leading to the arrest of Avon and most of his organization. After the arrest, Daniels is promoted to Major, and he and Pearlman celebrate.

=== Season 4 ===
With Daniels now a Major, Freamon is the guiding force behind the Major Case Unit and manages to tie evidence from the Barksdale money train to several politicians and developers who are on good terms with Mayor Clarence Royce. Pearlman is reluctant to sign the subpoenas, as she feels she will be demoted for enabling an investigation that would interfere with the election of her boss, Steven Demper. She is also worried Rupert Bond, an African American candidate for State's Attorney, might win the election, as she fears he will "bounce the white girl" to a demoted position due to her race in majority African American Baltimore.

The subpoenas are served and delayed by Burrell and Rawls, who then put Lieutenant Charles Marimow in charge of Major Crimes to obstruct Freamon. Demper loses the election, and Pearlman is promoted to deputy chief prosecutor in charge of violent crimes. She is valued for her courage by the newly elected Bond, who is more interested in good prosecutions than Demper. Pearlman is shocked, but pleased with the promotion and to find Daniels has been promoted to Colonel and Criminal Investigations Division Commander, and has influence with newly elected Mayor Tommy Carcetti. Pearlman's first case in VCU begins with numerous bodies Marlo Stanfield's crew have been committing in vacant houses around the city.

=== Season 5 ===
After more than a year of investigation, the Major Crimes Unit has failed to bring a case against Marlo for the vacant house murders. Pearlman is dismayed when the investigation and MCU are shut down by Carcetti because of funding issues.

The unit has also been building a corruption case against Senator Clay Davis, which is also jeopardized. Along with her domestic partner Cedric Daniels, Pearlman appeals to State's Attorney Rupert Bond to discuss the problem with Mayor Tommy Carcetti. However, despite their efforts, the Stanfield investigation is still closed down, although Pearlman is allowed to keep detectives Leander Sydnor and Lester Freamon to prepare the Davis case.

After criminal defense attorney Maurice Levy becomes aware of the illegal wiretap of Marlo Stanfield, Pearlman offers him a deal: Marlo goes free but retires permanently from the drug trade. Otherwise, she threatens to use the wiretap in court, reminding Levy that his sentence for illegally purchasing court documents and failure to report the wiretap will be longer than hers.

Pearlman works with the detectives to prepare the case. She then begins a series of witness depositions with the Grand Jury. Her witnesses include Senator Davis' driver Damien "Day-Day" Lavelle Price.

Freamon and Sydnor uncover new evidence that would justify a federal prosecution of Davis. Pearlman presents their findings to Bond, but to earn credit for the case he elects to keep the case local and ignore the potential for additional charges. Bond instructs Pearlman to stage a deposition for Davis, and in order to mark Davis as his target stages a photo opportunity for reporters as Davis leaves the courthouse.

Pearlman is thrilled when Daniels is touted by the papers as a potential replacement for Commissioner Burrell. Daniels is concerned that his history of corruption might surface, but does not confide in Pearlman. Daniels' fears are allayed when Burrell accepts a deal to leave quietly and Pearlman attends a press conference at which Daniels' promotion is announced. In the end-of-season montage, she is shown on the bench wearing judge's robes and recusing herself from a case in which Daniels is a defense attorney.
