= Spiros Vondas =

Character from The Wire

Spiros Vondopoulos Σπύρος Βονδόπουλος
- The Wire character
- Paul Ben-Victor as Spiros Vondas
- First appearance: "Ebb Tide" (2003)
- Last appearance: "–30–" (2008)
- Created by: David Simon
- Portrayed by: Paul Ben-Victor

In-universe information
- Alias: Spiros Vondopoulos, Kirko Skaddeng, János Kovats
- Nickname: Vondas
- Gender: Male
- Occupation: International smuggling/Organized Crime underboss

Spiros "Vondas" Vondopoulos (Greek: Σπύρος Βονδόπουλος) is a fictional character on the HBO drama The Wire played by actor Paul Ben-Victor and the secondary antagonist in season 2.

== Biography ==
Vondas is the Greek's second-in-command and acts as a buffer between the Greek and his illegal activities, using a small cafe as his base of operations. Vondas tells Nick Sobotka that he has "many names, many passports". Vondas' actual name and nationality are unknown; his main alias is Greek in origin, but he laughs to his superior that his name is not really his name.

The name Spiros Vondopoulos is one of a range of identities that he has available to him. For example, he holds Hungarian and Croatian passports, but it is unclear if he is really a citizen of these countries. He is later shown destroying his Hungarian passport during a meal with the Greek. Vondas' Hungarian identity is Janos Kovats from Budapest, and his Croatian identity is Kirko Skaddeng, who is ostensibly a medical assistant from Osijek.

Vondas is almost always seen wearing a newsboy cap and has a strong fashion sense, as when Bunk Moreland observes that Vondas is wearing a Joseph Abboud blazer in the Season 2 episode "Bad Dreams".

=== Season 2 ===
Vondas manages all aspects of the Greek's illicit shipping business but keeps a low, surveillance-conscious profile. He is Frank Sobotka's point of contact for his smuggling with the Greek. Vondas is even-tempered and patient, and often soothes the increasingly angry and frightened Sobotka as the Baltimore police began a serious investigation into Sobotka's union. Vondas also handles much less savory tasks: e.g., when a sailor in the Greek's employ, Sam, murdered fourteen girls meant for work as prostitutes, Vondas killed the man after the Greek interrogated him.

Vondas manages the Greek's drug dealing through their Israeli lieutenant Eton Ben-Eleazer. Vondas' own personnel involved in the smuggling operation include driver and enforcer Sergei "Serge" Malatov and organization fence George "Double G" Glekas.

Vondas often meets with Nick Sobotka, who frequently serves as Frank's go-between, and Vondas takes an almost paternal interest in the younger man. Impressed with Nick's intelligence, Vondas gave him the task of stealing a shipment of chemicals. Vondas also intervenes in a dispute over a debt between Nick's cousin Ziggy Sobotka and a drug dealer supplied by the Greek, Cheese Wagstaff.

Vondas often acts as the voice of reason in the Greeks inner circle as he proposes to deal with the Colombians who bought the chemicals from them but only paid 40% during the deal. His suggestion to help "their friend" within the FBI as a way of paying pack a favor is meet positively by the Greek who alludes that many of the actions carried out in Colombia could be of great interest to the FBI and the Anti-Terrorist Division. This results in "their friend" Agent Koutris seizing a shipment of cocaine from the Colombians going through the port disguised as other materials.

Despite a personal dislike for Ziggy, Vondas orders Sergei to argue Ziggy's case to Proposition Joe, Cheese's uncle and superior. Vondas' distrust of Ziggy proves correct when Ziggy kills Glekas in an argument over payment for stolen cars. Ziggy is arrested soon afterward, and Vondas distances the murder from the rest of the operation by removing all evidence of the business from the warehouse.

When Lieutenant Daniels's port detail begins investigating the Greek's activity, Frank Sobotka realizes what is happening and tips Vondas. During the finale, the investigation detail finally gets a photo of Spiros meeting with his drug lieutenant Eton on the Baltimore waterfront. The detail then surveils Vondas' home and follows him to meetings at hotel rooms and the diner where he meets with associates.

The Greek orders Vondas to shut down the smuggling operation temporarily and replace all of his personnel's telephones. The Greek also withdraws from their meeting place at the cafe and begins meeting Vondas in hotel rooms.

When the detail begins rounding up members of the Greek's smuggling ring, they hold off on Vondas, hoping he can lead them to the Greek. When Sobotka is arrested, Vondas suggests that they could broker his loyalty by having a witness against Ziggy change his story. Vondas puts the proposition to Frank through Nick. Frank has already agreed to testify against the Greek's crew but decides to meet with them for Ziggy's sake. The Greek learns of Frank's agreement through his inside man at the FBI, agent Koutris, and has Vondas murder Frank.

Following the murder, the Greek and Vondas leave the country; Vondas uses a fake Croatian passport with the alias Kirko Skaddeng. Before Vondas leaves, he meets with Proposition Joe to assure him that the Greek's operation will continue to supply him, using new personnel, after a short break to avoid the investigation.

=== Season 4 ===
After Omar Little's team steals a shipment from the Greek to Proposition Joe's New Day Co-Op, Joe sets up a meeting with Vondas and Marlo Stanfield in order to assuage Marlo's suspicions that Joe had set him up in order to make him pay twice for the same shipment. It is thus revealed that Vondas had returned to Baltimore some time after the Major Crimes investigation of the docks had ended, and that Vondas had resumed his working relationship with Proposition Joe. While Marlo is satisfied with Vondas' explanation, he places a tail on him in order to learn more about Vondas' role in importing the drugs into Baltimore.

=== Season 5 ===
Once the Major Crimes investigation into his organization is shut down, Marlo Stanfield feels secure enough in making a move to establish a direct relationship with Vondas and the Greeks. He researches the port case and discovers that former Greek soldier Sergei Malatov is incarcerated at Jessup. After paying prison gang leader Avon Barksdale to gain access to Sergei, Marlo uses Sergei to locate the Greeks' diner headquarters and drops off a large sum of money in order to persuade Vondas to grant him a meeting.

Vondas is displeased that Marlo has brought him dirty money, from the street, and insists that all business should continue to go through Joe, then sends Marlo on his way. Marlo quickly has Joe clean his cash, and he drops off the fresh money at the diner, telling Vondas' man that he didn't mean for there to be any misunderstanding.

Marlo once again meets with Vondas and attempts to sell himself as an insurance policy for the Greeks, implying that if anything were to happen to Proposition Joe, they would need another agent they could do business with. While Vondas believes all that matters is that the Greeks already have a secure relationship with someone they trust, the Greek states that Marlo makes a valid point that it is wise to have an insurance policy in volatile times, implicitly telling Marlo that if he moves on Joe, they will not stop him.

After Marlo leaves, Vondas and the Greek seem resigned to Joe's demise and to initiating a new business relationship with Marlo, believing that Joe's time has come, and that Marlo's tenacity and ambition will not allow him to accept the Greeks' rejection of his business overtures.

After Marlo has Proposition Joe murdered, he receives Vondas' blessing to be Joe's replacement as agent between Vondas' drug shipments and the New Day Co-op's drug distribution activities.

Later, Marlo's first re-supply with the Greeks is busted by the Major Crimes Unit, and as part of a deal with the State's Attorney's office, Marlo is forced to retire from his life of crime. To set himself up for life, Marlo sells the connection to the Greeks to whoever can pay him 10 million dollars. In the series finale, Vondas is seen meeting with Fat Face Rick and Slim Charles at Little Johnny's Diner. They are discussing the new business arrangement, while the Greek quietly listens in the background.
