= Jay Landsman (The Wire) =

Fictional character

- The Wire character
- Delaney Williams as Jay Landsman
- First appearance: "The Target" (2002)
- Last appearance: "–30– (2008)
- Created by: David Simon
- Based on: Jay Landsman
- Portrayed by: Delaney Williams

In-universe information
- Alias: Jaybird
- Race: Jewish American
- Gender: Male
- Title: Sergeant
- Occupation: Baltimore homicide Sergeant

Jay Landsman is a character on the HBO drama The Wire, a fictionalised version of the real-life Baltimore City police officer Jay Landsman. The fictional character of Landsman is portrayed by actor Delaney Williams.

== Biography ==
=== Policing method ===
Landsman's role in the police department is that of a supervisory detective sergeant who rarely participates in real investigative work. Landsman generally acts in the best interests of his subordinates, especially those who give him the necessary clearances (closed cases). As a supervisor, Landsman acts in accordance with the wishes of his superior officers, even though, in some cases, he does not necessarily agree with specific commands.

Examples of this are when he is ordered to have Bunk Moreland find Kenneth Dozerman's missing firearm in Season 3 and when a dead state's witness becomes an electoral issue in Season 4. Throughout the series, he is shown as a commander attempting to strike a balance between loyalty to subordinates and superiors, most often favoring the latter. Landsman has only been called to solve a few murders on his own as a supervisor.

While Landsman is a source of comic relief in the series due to his laziness, girth, overeating, and penchant for nonchalantly reading pornographic magazines while on the job, he is also depicted as quick-witted and relatively cultured by Department standards. He possesses a shrewd understanding of the subtle politics in the chain of command, almost always acting in self-preservation and self-promotion without making many enemies. He states that clearly to McNulty, during the first episode of season 2, by saying it is all about self-preservation and it is too bad that McNulty never learned that.

Under Landsman's supervision, the homicide unit ends up often clearing many of the more challenging "whodunit" homicides occurring in Baltimore city, proving him to be an effective sergeant within the department. He can be mildly bullying and tends to derive his good humor from schadenfreude, though he is not generally malicious.

He has the duty of ministering in the informal "detective wakes" held in honor of the deceased at Kavanaugh's, the bar frequented by many in the department, a task he completes with uncharacteristic reverence and emotion. Wakes take place in Season 3 (for Ray Cole), Season 4 (for Raymond Foerster) and Season 5 (for the ostracized, but still-living Jimmy McNulty).

=== Season 1 ===
Landsman is a squad sergeant in the homicide division of the Baltimore police department. His commanding officer is originally William Rawls. Landsman's squad consists of Jimmy McNulty, Bunk Moreland, Michael Santangelo, Ray Cole, Ed Norris and Vernon Holley. Landsman finds the misfortune of the cops in his unit a constant source of amusement but is also protective of them at times. He is loyal to Rawls and also doggedly pursues the high case clearance rates that Rawls aims for but is realistic about the capabilities of his detectives.

When McNulty goes around the chain of command and incurs Rawls's wrath by being detailed to another unit Landsman appears unsympathetic. He insists that McNulty's work looking at old homicide cases for the detail be put to his advantage to make up for losing a detective. To this end, he insists that McNulty look into the Deirdre Kresson murder case; McNulty is initially reluctant because the case appears unrelated to the Barksdale case.

Landsman is sure a link will be found and his intuition later proves correct. However, Landsman does argue McNulty's case with Rawls and manages to get Rawls to agree that McNulty can return to Homicide with a clean slate if the investigation gets wrapped up quickly. Despite Landsman's best efforts, McNulty remains out of favor with Rawls because he refuses to end the case he is working on prematurely.

Landsman always maintains a black and twisted humor about the work of his squad. When Rawls gives Santangelo an ultimatum of clearing a "whodunit" case by day's end, Landsman sends him to a phony psychic. He claims that the woman, Madame LaRue, is especially gifted in "matters of death investigation". Santangelo takes this questionable advice by burying a doll in a grave, and waking up later that night to be given evidence in the murder that had occurred. When Santangelo sees that he has been given information regarding an open homicide, he thanks Landsman, who tells him that the Gypsy routine was a joke and that it had been Bunk and McNulty who saved his career.

Landsman's squad handles the case of the killing of Wendell "Orlando" Blocker and wounding of Kima Greggs, and he is personally involved in the investigation.

=== Season 2 ===
Initial suspicions are confirmed when Landsman admits to McNulty it was he who informed Rawls as to where he didn't want to be re-stationed. He learned of this while being present when McNulty discussed it early in season one. Landsman's squad is altered as Rawls transferred Santangelo and McNulty from the unit for displeasing him by working with the Barksdale detail, with McNulty going to the Marine unit and Santangelo becoming a beat cop in the Western District. Lester Freamon returns to homicide after a thirteen-year (and four month) absence and joins Landsman's squad.

When Rawls is forced to take on the case of fourteen unidentified dead women, he entrusts it to Landsman. Landsman replaces Detective Ray Cole as the investigator and gives the case to Freamon and Bunk. When his detectives start working with Cedric Daniels on the Sobotka detail, Landsman sees the potential to offload the responsibility of the case but Daniels initially refuses. Landsman is responsible for the interrogation of Ziggy Sobotka after he kills George "Double G" Glekas. Although Ziggy quickly confesses, Landsman fails to inform Daniels' specialized detail about the murder in time for them to become involved. Daniels is irate with Landsman for his lack of forethought when it allows the Greek and his cohorts to dispose of evidence at the Glekas crime scene. Allowing the main targets of the network to escape.

=== Season 3 ===
Landsman is mainly associated with finding the service weapon of Kenneth Dozerman, whose gun was stolen in a failed undercover buy. He has Bunk look for the gun, pressuring him intensely until Bunk writes a ten-page report stating how unproductive the investigation has become. Bunk tries to blow off the case, believing he has more important priorities, and Landsman appears to give Bunk his blessing to work murders instead. Landsman delivers the eulogy at the Detective's Wake held for Ray Cole after his sudden death.

Landsman later appears following the death of Derrick Waggoner, a black plainclothes officer accidentally killed by Prez, who had mistaken him for a criminal. Landsman is personally angry at the death, referring to it as a "clusterfuck" as Waggoner was a 6 1/2-year veteran who was 16th on the current sergeant's list with two commendations while Prez is known for his incompetence and only remains in the department all due to his father-in-law Stan Valchek, the Southeastern district commander.

=== Season 4 ===
Landsman is not above getting involved in politics. When his detective Ed Norris informs him he's investigating the murder of a state's witness Landsman passes the knowledge on to Major Valchek in secret. Valchek leaks the information to Tommy Carcetti who uses it against the current mayor in a key debate.

Landsman's squad is boosted by the return of Lester Freamon and the addition of Kima Greggs when a new unit commander drives them out of the major case unit. Landsman sums up Lieutenant Marimow's leadership style, for alientaing talented officers commenting "he heaves talent way with great effect". Landsman and his detectives constantly tease Greggs when she first joins the unit. Political pressure forces Landsman to assign Greggs, instead of Norris, to the witness murder. When this information is leaked to the press, Landsman attends a press conference with Greggs and Norris to defuse the story by claiming that they were working it together.

Greggs feels used by her superiors and this creates friction between her and Landsman. Landsman is forced to intercede in the investigation a second time when Norris threatens to break the case on the eve of the election. Rawls tells him whatever the outcome of the case, one of the candidates will be put out and it is better to leave it pending until after the election. Landsman is told to reassign Greggs and Norris to polling station duty for the day to prevent progress in their investigation.

After the election, Greggs solves the Braddock case which tends to provide less leads than were initially given and she gains Landsman's respect in the process. Landsman then is seen delivering the eulogy for Colonel Foerester who he claimed had a miraculous career serving 39 years without a trace of bitterness or hostility, a rarity in the Baltimore Police Department. Landsman is then seen criticizing Detective Moreland for reversing one of Detective Holley's clearances as he is against cases going from "black to red."

Following Foerester's death, Cedric Daniels is named C.I.D. colonel and allocates more resources to the investigative divisions to allow for more quality investigations, at the order of Mayor-elect Tommy Carcetti. Landsman then witnesses Detective Lester Freamon discovering dead bodies in abandoned houses and is initially against their discovery because it will raise the city's homicide rate.

When more bodies are discovered, Landsman realizes the squad can't maintain an acceptable clearance rate and becomes less concerned about the department's numbers. Landsman finally sees Bubbles turn himself in for murder of a teenager, and intervenes to revive Bubbles following a suicide attempt in the interrogation room. After hearing that the teenager's death was accidental, Landsman in a rare moment of empathy, decides not to press homicide charges sending him to a psychiatric unit at Bayview instead.

=== Season 5 ===
After McNulty is forced out of the police department, Landsman delivers a speech at the wake in McNulty's honor. He cites his insubordination and personality flaws but also says McNulty is the best detective he has ever had and is sorry for losing him. He fakes breaking out in tears at the end.

== Origins ==
The character is based on and named after a real homicide detective sergeant whom David Simon had met while researching the book Homicide: A Year on the Killing Streets. The character is often given dialogue that the writers recall the real Landsman using. Delaney Williams was chosen for the part because of the creators' experience of working with him in small roles on Homicide and The Corner.

The real Jay Landsman can also be seen on The Wire in the role of Dennis Mello, administrative aide to Major Colvin, first in an uncredited appearance in the season 2 episode "Stray Rounds", and later as a regular cast member. The real Landsman was the inspiration for detective John Munch, a character from Homicide: Life on the Street and Law & Order: Special Victims Unit.

Among the discrepancies between the character on The Wire and the real Jay Landsman, the most prominent is their physique: the real Landsman was the least overweight sergeant in the homicide squad, while The Wire's version is morbidly obese, sometimes referred to by his subordinates as "fat man."
