= The Greek =

Character from The Wire

- The Wire character
- Bill Raymond as The Greek
- First appearance: "Ebb Tide" (2003)
- Last appearance: "–30–" (2008)
- Created by: David Simon
- Portrayed by: Bill Raymond

In-universe information
- Gender: Male
- Occupation: International smuggler Organized crime boss

The Greek is a fictional character on the HBO drama The Wire, played by actor Bill Raymond. The Greek is the head of an international smuggling organization, including narcotics and human trafficking. The Greek is a mysterious figure involved in numerous criminal activities. His given name is never mentioned on the show and he is known only as the Greek, although he stated that he is not actually Greek.

A quiet and unassuming man, the Greek prefers to keep a low profile, operating all of his business through his lieutenant Spiros "Vondas" Vondopoulos. His smuggling organization operated from a small diner in Baltimore for years, and while Vondas would conduct business the Greek would listen in quietly at the counter. Nick Sobotka, upon seeing the Greek identify himself, was amazed that the shadowy figure had been in plain sight the entire time. He serves as the primary antagonist of the second season.

Despite his calm demeanor, the Greek is cunning and ruthless, and only interested in facts that make him more money. Series creator David Simon has said that the Greek is an embodiment of raw unencumbered capitalism. Anyone interfering in this process is eliminated immediately, and he prefers to leave victims headless and handless to hinder identification. His smuggling operation includes importing sex trade workers, illicit drugs, stolen goods and chemicals for drug processing. He bribes union stevedores to move containers through the Baltimore port for him and uses his enforcer, Sergei Malatov, to run containers back and forth from the port to his warehouse, a front managed by "Double G" Glekas.

The Greek supplies the major drug dealers in East Baltimore with pure heroin, using Eton Ben-Eleazer to move his drugs. His chief client is Proposition Joe, but he is also affiliated with smaller drug dealing organizations like those run by "White Mike" McArdle. His sex trade interests in Baltimore include a brothel run by a madam named Ilona Petrovna, bringing in girls from eastern Europe. He manages to avoid prosecution for his crimes because an FBI counter-terrorism agent named Kristos Koutris tips him off if a criminal investigation gets too close. It is suggested the Greek and Vondas may serve as federal informants.

== Biography ==
=== Season two ===
The Greek begins to draw police attention in Highlandtown, Baltimore when his contact at the docks, Frank Sobotka, becomes the target of an investigation. At the same time a container of thirteen dead young women intended for the sex trade is discovered at the docks, triggering a high-profile homicide investigation. The container belongs to the Greek; the women were killed by a crewman on board the vessel that had delivered them.

The ship's crew were paying the women for sex and when one of the girls refused, she was killed. The crewman responsible dumped her overboard (her body later being picked up by Jimmy McNulty and Claude Diggins) and collapsed the air pipe on the container to kill the remaining women by stifling them. The Greek has Sergei track the crewman down, interrogates him personally, and has Vondas kill him.

As the investigation continues, the police link Eton and Sergei to the drug smuggling operation. When police begin tracking containers as they leave the port, the Greek and Vondas close down the operation temporarily by dumping their cell phones and stealing "clean" containers. Persuading Sobotka to keep the smuggling operation going, the Greek buys further protection from Agent Koutris by betraying a load of Colombian cocaine, giving him time to destroy incriminating evidence in the warehouse and Glekas' store.

The Greek recognizes that the investigation is too extensive to stop and plans to leave, sending Vondas to assure Proposition Joe that supply of drugs would continue albeit with new faces. He attempts to buy Sobotka's silence with promised legal aid for his son, but when he learned from Koutris that Frank was planning to turn informant he had the union man killed. Frank’s nephew Nick Sobotka is considered to be a threat to the Greek’s organization briefly, before Vondas and the Greek decide he knows too little about their actual identities to be sure. Nick identifies the Greek in a photo and Sergei is pressured to give up the location of his hotel suite, Vondas and the Greek have already boarded a flight to Chicago. Aware that the Greek and Vondas are gone, the police leave the investigation behind and move on to the drug dealers he supplied.

=== Seasons four and five ===
The Greek continues to supply "Proposition Joe" Stewart, who forms an organization with other drug dealers, the New Day Co-Op, to provide the Greek's product to them in exchange for reduced violence and sharing of territory. When Omar Little steals an entire shipment of heroin from the Greek's men as it is being delivered to Stewart's people, Marlo Stanfield demands a meeting with Spiros "Vondas" Vondopoulos in order to allay his fears that Stewart was responsible. Once Stanfield is satisfied, he waits for the Major Crimes Unit's investigation into his activities to cease and then moves to establish a direct relationship with Vondas and the Greek, after getting in communication with Vondas through former soldier Sergei.

Marlo eventually sells himself as Joe's replacement by convincing the Greek that he requires an insurance policy in the form of a replacement for Proposition Joe, in the event that anything should happen to him. Realizing that Stanfield will move against Stewart regardless of his approval, the Greek accepts Marlo's proposal to act as an "insurance policy," knowing that it will mean Joe's death. While the Greek and Vondas make peace with this development they still sadly acknowledge that Stanfield is "not Joe" as Proposition Joe was a steady partner which they could rely and had business with for years.

After Stewart's murder, Stanfield meets with Vondas to initiate their new business relationship. Stanfield's tenure proves short lived when he is forced into retirement by an investigation, and the other Co-Op members purchase the connection from Stanfield. In the closing montage of the series finale, Slim Charles and Fat-Face Rick take over meeting with Vondas while the Greek listens quietly in the background.
