= Delaney Williams =

American actor (born 1962)

- Born: William Delaney; December 12, 1962 (age 63); Washington, D.C., U.S.
- Occupation: Actor
- Years active: 1997–present
- Website: DelaneyWilliams.com

Delaney Williams (born December 12, 1962) is an American character actor from Washington, D.C. He appeared on the HBO drama The Wire (2002–2008) as a recurring guest star playing homicide sergeant Jay Landsman. He also had a small role on HBO's mini-series The Corner (2000), which brought him to the attention of the producers who worked on The Corner prior to casting The Wire. He has also made appearances on such shows as Law & Order: Special Victims Unit, Law & Order: Criminal Intent, Veep, Cold Case, and The Punisher.

== Filmography ==
Television roles
Year	Title	Role	Notes
1998	Homicide: Life on the Street	Joey Grimaldi	1 episode
2000	The Corner	Scale Guy	2 episodes
2002–2008	The Wire	Sgt. Jay Landsman	45 episodes
2003	The West Wing	Reporter	1 episode Uncredited
2004	Law & Order: Criminal Intent	Ernie Dominguez	1 episode
2004	Cold Case	Fred Calvin	1 episode
2010–2020	Law & Order: Special Victims Unit	Defense Attorney John Buchanan	14 episodes
2013	Veep	Joe Walker	1 episode
2016	Blue Bloods	Bureau Chief Dennis Egan	3 episodes
2017	Elementary	Joseph Tommolino	1 episode
2017	The Punisher	O'Connor	3 episodes
2022	We Own This City	Kevin Davis	6 episodes
2025	Chicago P.D.	Warden Scott	1 episode

=== Film ===
Year	Title	Role	Notes
1998	Pecker	Construction Worker	
1998	A Case Against Karen	Sebastian Carter	Uncredited
1999	Falling to Peaces	Ed Thomas	
2000	Eat Me!	Daryl	Credited as Bill Delaney
2003	Head of State	Teamster	
2004	Ladder 49	Fireman Bill	
2013	Beneath the Harvest Sky	James	
