= Frank Sobotka =

Character from The Wire

- The Wire character
- Chris Bauer as Frank Sobotka
- First appearance: "Ebb Tide" (2003)
- Last appearance: "Port in a Storm" (2003)
- Created by: David Simon
- Portrayed by: Chris Bauer

In-universe information
- Title: IBS Secretary/Treasurer
- Occupation: Union Leader, Smuggler
- Family: Louis Sobotka (brother), Nick Sobotka (nephew), Three unseen sisters
- Spouse: Unseen wife
- Children: Chester "Ziggy" Sobotka

Francis "Frank" Sobotka is a fictional character in season two of the HBO drama The Wire, played by the actor Chris Bauer.

== Plot ==
Frank is a respected Polish-American treasurer for the International Brotherhood of Stevedores at the Baltimore docks. As the pater familias for the docks' longshoremen population, he manages the finances of the labor union and ensures that workers are taken care of—a task made harder by the decline of the local shipping industry and lack of available hours.

In Episode 6, Sobotka lobbies the Maryland state government to promote more employment at the Baltimore shipyards through grants to improve the port. Yet the power of the International Brotherhood of Stevedores (IBS), Sobotka's union, was already diminished. With union membership down, the IBS collaborated with smugglers to offset some of its lost revenue.

Desperate to return prosperity to the docks, he begins making overtures to lobbyists and politicians to support initiatives that will make the port a more attractive shipping location. His two main objectives are to have the Chesapeake & Delaware Canal dredged to increase the depth for incoming ships and to re-open the grain pier. Bruce DiBiago, a lobbyist, serves as a go-between for Sobotka and politicians such as State Senator Clay Davis.

To obtain the necessary funds for paying the bribes, Sobotka arranges with European gangsters "The Greek" and Spiros "Vondas" Vondopoulos to smuggle goods through the port. Ships with contraband such as drugs and human trafficking victims for the purpose of sexual slavery will be tagged by Frank's union cohort Thomas "Horseface" Pakusa, with the crates disappearing in the computer system and driven out by the Greek's man Sergei "Serge" Malatov. Frank's nephew Nick Sobotka, another union member, acts as a go-between for his uncle and Vondas by passing messages and delivering lists of containers to be moved. Unbeknownst to Frank, his troubled son, Chester "Ziggy" Sobotka, often accompanies Nick to these meetings.

Frank's criminal activities begin to be suspected by the police following a feud with Major Stan Valchek, district commander for the Baltimore Police Department's Southeast District, whose gift of a stained glass window to a local church has been eclipsed by Sobotka's more elaborate window (a move to have the priest get Frank closer to a senator in his congregation). Suspicious of how a dockworker could have so much disposable income, Valchek persuades Deputy Commissioner Ervin Burrell to assemble a detail to investigate Sobotka's activities.

The investigation gains further traction with the discovery of thirteen dead girls in a shipping container ("can"), who turn out to be human trafficking victims for the purpose of sexual slavery smuggled in by The Greek and who were killed by the sailors shipping them in for witnessing the death of one of their colleagues (whose body had earlier been tossed overboard and was picked up by Jimmy McNulty).

Frank is enraged that human trafficking is taking place in his port. He confronts Vondas, asking why he was not informed about it so that he could have taken extra precautions. Vondas points out that Frank said he did not want to know what the Greeks were smuggling into the country (to distance himself from further criminal liability). Frank says that if anything is breathing inside a container, he needs to know about it.

With detectives asking questions about the dead girls, some strange goings-on with his cell phone, and his suspicions about his friend Officer Beadie Russell's involvement in the case, Frank becomes increasingly nervous. He demands to meet The Greek and tells him he wants out. The Greek, who needs Frank's system, objects. Nick then asks for more money so they can take on the extra risk. The Greek and Frank agree to this arrangement, but Frank is ever more uneasy, and his world unravels.

Towards the end of the season, Frank is arrested on smuggling charges after the detail is pressured into making arrests. Valchek personally escorts a compliant Frank out of the union hall in handcuffs, and the resulting media attention leads lawmakers to cut their ties. With his efforts to save the port sunk, and with Ziggy arrested for murdering a fence and Nick wanted for selling drugs, Sobotka decides to accept Russell's advice and turn informant on The Greek.

Before passing information to the police, The Greek arranges for a meeting in which Frank will be offered to have a state's witness change their story at Ziggy's trial in exchange for Frank's silence. However, The Greek is tipped off by his inside man in the FBI that Frank is about to turn informant. Frank is last seen alive, walking resolutely beneath a bridge to the rendezvous with The Greek in a final effort to save his son.

Frank's body is found in the harbor the following day, with multiple stab wounds and his throat cut. Detectives remark that numerous defensive wounds indicate he died fighting. After his death, his fellow dockworkers, in tribute to Frank, re-elect him as treasurer in defiance of federal warnings, which leads to the dissolution of his local union office.

== Miscellaneous ==
A picture of former Baltimore Colts owner Robert Irsay is pinned on Frank Sobotka's dartboard. Irsay moved the Colts from Baltimore to Indianapolis in 1984. As a result, he is one of the most hated figures in Baltimore.

== Bibliography ==
- Warren, Kenneth W. (2011). "Sociology and The Wire" (PDF). Critical Inquiry. 38 (1).
