= Nick Sobotka =

Character from The Wire

- The Wire character
- Pablo Schreiber as Nick Sobotka
- First appearance: "Ebb Tide" (2003)
- Last appearance: "The Dickensian Aspect" (2008)
- Created by: David Simon
- Portrayed by: Pablo Schreiber

In-universe information
- Gender: Male
- Occupation: Dock worker, drug dealer, smuggler
- Family: Louis Sobotka (father), Joan Sobotka (mother)
- Spouse: Aimee
- Children: Ashley
- Relatives: Frank Sobotka (uncle), Ziggy Sobotka (cousin)

Nicholas Andrew Sobotka is a fictional character on the HBO drama The Wire, played by actor Pablo Schreiber. Nick is the cousin of Ziggy Sobotka, the wayward and rebellious son of Nick's uncle Frank Sobotka.

== Plot details ==
=== Season 2 ===
Nick is a dockworker in the Port of Baltimore, and works for his uncle Frank Sobotka, the secretary treasurer for a stevedores union. He often has to keep his cousin (and Frank's son) Ziggy out of trouble, something his uncle appreciates. Despite Nick's disdain for Ziggy's antics, Nick shows considerable patience and genuinely cares about Ziggy. He is also firm, trusted and streetwise in the community.

Involved in his uncle's smuggling operation, Nick often serves as Frank's go-between in meetings with Spiros "Vondas" Vondopoulos. At the diner Vondas uses as an office, Nick acquires the serial numbers of cargo containers being smuggled in by The Greek.

Nick has a girlfriend, Aimee, with whom he has a daughter, Ashley. They want to move in together, but are unable to afford a place of their own. The fact that Nick lives with his parents and lacks a steady income leads to tension between the two. Since Nick is one of the younger stevedores, seniority prevents him from getting enough work at the docks.

Desperate for cash, he and Ziggy steal a trailer full of cameras and sell it to the Greek's front man, Glekas. This brings Nick to the attention of Vondas, who asks for large quantities of chemicals. Nick accepts this job after learning that the chemicals are used in the processing of drugs instead of bombs.

Nick enters the drug trade to help relieve Ziggy from the debt he owes to Proposition Joe's nephew Cheese. Cheese cooperates when Nick arrives with Sergei "Serge" Malatov to threaten him at gunpoint. Later, Nick sells heroin to a drug dealer named Frog after receiving it as payment from Vondas. Nick begins dealing with "White" Mike McArdle in order to continue supplying Frog. Despite his favour for his cousin, Ziggy rejects Nick's help and makes an ill-fated attempt to start a car theft racket. Killing Glekas after he shorts him on the payment, Nick delivers the news to his uncle who is angry, that Ziggy is involved with the Greeks.

Nick is distraught when Ziggy is arrested for killing Glekas. Knowing that Ziggy's stature and temperament make him ill-suited for prison, Nick descends into a drunken depression and tearfully laments the circumstances that landed Ziggy behind bars. Eventually, police obtain a warrant for Nick's arrest. Nick is not picked up as he spent the night with a former girlfriend. His parents are aghast to see Nick's stash of money and drugs when their house is raided. He meets with Vondas, regretful of getting involved with the Greeks, Spiros floats the idea of running away showing him an Austrian passport.

Knowing about Ziggy's case, the Greeks make an offer of witness intimidation in hopes of buying Frank's silence. Nick relays this offer, prompting Frank to arrange a meeting with the Greeks alone, Nick attempts to go with Frank but his Uncle angrily orders him to stay away. From their mole in the FBI, the Greeks learn that Frank had previously told the police he intended to co-operate and kill him once he arrives. Unknown to Nick he goes to look for his uncle but only finds his car, arriving at the docks when his Uncle's body is brought to the shore, realising he would've likely been killed as well, in anger he attempts to go after the Greeks but is stopped by Horseface and restrained by other dock workers. Grieving over his uncle's death, Nick at his father urging turns himself in to the police in order to testify and help them. Bunk dispels the Greek's lies that they could've helped Ziggy as he cooperated, signed a statement and gave them a receipt from the store where he purchased the firearm. Nick cooperates helping them identify the Greek for the first time and identifying the network. Doing so on the condition that they honor the agreement that his uncle made regarding Ziggy and to avoid serious prison time for his role.

At the end of season two, Nick, Aimee and Ashley enter federal witness protection. In the last scene, he sheds a tear looking at the decaying shipping shoreline, symbolizing the death of blue-collar work in American industry.

=== Season 5 ===
Nick makes a brief appearance in season five, heckling Mayor Tommy Carcetti’s ribbon-cutting ceremony for the conversion of a derelict grain pier into condos and waterfront commercial space, contrary to what his uncle Frank had hoped. This, together with the appearance of Johnny Fifty in a homeless encampment earlier in the season, suggests that the port has been continuing job cuts since season two. No information about Nick's life is provided, although Simon has since said that Nick left the witness protection program after missing his friends and family.
