= Roland Pryzbylewski =

Character from The Wire

- The Wire character
- Jim True-Frost as Roland Pryzbylewski
- First appearance: "The Detail" (2002)
- Last appearance: "–30–" (2008)
- Created by: David Simon
- Portrayed by: Jim True-Frost

In-universe information
- Aliases: Prez; Mr. Prezbo
- Gender: Male
- Occupation: Detective; School teacher
- Spouse: Judy Pryzbylewski
- Relatives: Stanislaus Valchek (father-in-law)

Roland "Prez" Pryzbylewski is a fictional character on the HBO drama The Wire, played by actor Jim True-Frost. Pryzbylewski is a detective of Polish heritage in the Baltimore Police Department. Initially seen as incompetent and rash, he proves to function better behind the scenes as a talented code-cracker. He eventually leaves the Baltimore Police Department due to the turmoil surrounding his accidental shooting of another officer, and later finds meaning as a dedicated middle school teacher.

== Casting ==
Jim True-Frost had worked on an episode of Homicide: Life on the Street, and was cast on the strength of that performance.

== Character background and plot relations ==
"Prez" is well known within the department for his incompetence; an oft-recounted incident involved shooting up his own squad car in a panic and then calling in a false report. He has been bounced around various units, and many fellow police officers consider him an inept detective. Because he is married to senior officer Stanislaus "Stan" Valchek's daughter Judy, he is protected from termination, despite their mutual animosity. Prior to Season 1, Pryzbylewski had been working in the casualty division under Major Walter Cantrell.

Though portrayed as a decent man who occasionally shows flashes of intelligence, Prez shies away from the brutal realities of Baltimore police work. Despite eventually winning his colleagues' respect in the Barksdale Detail through his code-breaking and paper-trail skills, he is never truly comfortable as a police officer. By contrast, he later becomes a dedicated and capable teacher.

=== Season one ===
Prez is sent to Lieutenant Daniels' Barksdale detail because Deputy Commissioner Burrell allows the unit commanders to dump their most incompetent officers on Daniels. Upon arrival, he accidentally shoots a wall while showing off modifications to his gun. Though appalled, Daniels agrees to keep Prez if Cantrell will also give him Leander Sydnor, the best detective under Major Cantrell's command.

Later, Prez, Herc, and Carver drunkenly incite a near-riot at the Franklin Terrace Towers, and Prez pistol-whips a teenager with his service weapon, blinding him in one eye. Notably, even the brutality-prone duo of Herc and Carver think Prez's actions are unjustified. Daniels stands up for his detective and protects him from serious repercussions by providing Prez with a suitable story for Internal Investigations; Prez is ultimately suspended from street duty, but Valchek thanks Daniels for helping Prez.

Stuck in the office, a bored Prez begins playing with the Barksdale organization's pager codes, eventually breaking them and greatly contributing to the case. Mentored by Freamon, he discovers a gift for wiretap work and following the paper trail, eventually becoming valuable to the team.

=== Season two ===
Prez confesses to his father-in-law that his earlier problems were largely due to dissatisfaction with his traffic police work. He tells him that detailed case work is his passion and that he wants to continue to work major cases. When Valchek starts feuding with Frank Sobotka, he requests a detail similar to the Barksdale detail. As in the previous case, Burrell gives him a team largely consisting of incompetent "humps".

Prez is given minor authority in the detail, but Lieutenant Grayson will not follow his recommendations on how to proceed. Prez tells his father-in-law that the detail is making little progress, and after witnessing the unit, Valchek demands that Daniels be made unit commander, threatening Burrell's bid to become police commissioner.

When the focus of the investigation shifts away from Sobotka, Valchek angrily confronts the detail, berating Prez specifically. Prez stands up for their work and punches Valchek. With Prez facing charges of insubordination and assaulting a commanding officer, Daniels stands up for him again, pointing out that if there is an official inquiry the FBI agents present during the incident would affirm that Prez hit Valchek only after the latter shoved and insulted him. Valchek agrees that Prez can return to the detail following a written apology and two months of working the midnight shift as a narcotics detective in his district.

=== Season three ===
Prez joins Daniels' newly formed Major Crimes Unit. Late one night, while responding with McNulty to a distress call, Prez does not properly identify himself and kills a plainclothes officer Derrick Waggoner in a case of mistaken identity. He is brought up on administrative charges and suspended because the officer was African American, and the shooting is seen as being potentially racially motivated. Despite his strained relationship with Prez, Valcheck urges Daniels to defend him. Daniels verifies from other officers in the Unit the Prez is not a racist and urges Prez to get his union involved, Prez who is too defeated refuses and is put on suicide watch. Landsman in a conversation to Jimmy, describes the situation as a "Clusterfuck". Comparing Prez less than favourably to Waggoner who has beeen commmended for bravery twice and was on a list for potential promotion.

This prompts a hearing from both the courts and the Vanguard (Baltimore's African American police officer union). Horrified by what he has done, Prez quits the force despite Daniels, Caroline Massey and Lester Freamon (who are African-American) agreeing to testify that they believe Prez is not a racist. Despite Freamons support and counsel that people will realise it was an accident. The incident is enough for Prez to realise that he will only be seen as a liability, who will only be regarded for his incompetence and nepotism.

=== Season four ===
Prez starts a new career as a math teacher at Edward Tilghman Middle School. As a teacher, he initially struggles with comanding respect and behaviour of his pupils. He becomes attached to the students in his classroom, even going as far as to assist neglected student Duquan "Dukie" Weems with laundry and food that his family does not provide (they sell his possessions for drug money). After Randy admits to knowing about Lex's murder to Principal Donnelley, Prez agrees to handle this discreetly and passes the information on to Daniels.

He later finds out that Randy has been labelled a snitch after Herc mishandles an interview with Randy and is disappointed with his friends at the precinct. He refuses to aid the investigation any further but gives information to Bunk and Freamon helping them uncover Lex's and other drug rival related murders. Later, Prez discovers that Dukie is no longer attending middle school and is working on the corner. Prez sees through the school system's flaws, but adapts well, and becomes a dedicated teacher who enjoys helping his students advance through class.

=== Season five ===
Prez is only seen once in Season 5, appearing in the series finale "–30–". He has grown a beard, and appears to have become a capable and well-respected teacher. Duquan "Dukie" Weems visits him and asks for money, ostensibly to pay rent and enroll in a GED program, but actually to buy heroin. Prez agrees, but warns Dukie that if he is lying their friendship is over. Prez drives off disappointed but unsurprised when he sees Dukie using the money to support his newly developed drug addiction.

== Origins ==
The character's code-breaking ability, and the season 1 pager code itself, are based on the Melvin Williams case investigated by Harry Edgerton and Ed Burns. Prez's experiences as a teacher are based on those of Ed Burns, who became a Baltimore middle school teacher when he retired from the Police.
