= Stan Valchek =

Character from The Wire

Stanislaus Valchek
- The Wire character
- Al Brown as Stan Valchek
- First appearance: "The Buys" (2002)
- Last appearance: "–30–" (2008)
- Created by: David Simon
- Portrayed by: Al Brown

In-universe information
- Gender: Male
- Title: Commissioner
- Occupation: Baltimore Police
- Spouse: Kate
- Children: Joan Pryzbylewski (daughter)
- Relatives: Roland Pryzbylewski (son-in-law)

Stanislaus "Stan" Valchek is a fictional character on the HBO drama The Wire, played by actor Al Brown.

== Biography ==
Valchek is the Polish-American commander of the Baltimore Police Department in the Southeastern district, home to many of the remaining white neighborhoods in Baltimore. More a politician than a policeman, he has ties with various Democratic organizations close to City Hall, most notably the politically influential developer Andrew Krawczyk. His political adroitness helps him quickly ascend the ranks, though commanding officers, such as Commissioner Ervin Burrell and Deputy Commissioner William Rawls, dislike him. Valchek is Roland "Prez" Pryzbylewski's father-in-law.

=== Season 1 ===
Valchek first appears in a meeting with Deputy Commissioner Burrell and Lieutenant Cedric Daniels, trying to smooth over Prez's drunken maiming of a fourteen-year-old. Valchek tells Daniels that if he helps Prez, Valchek will owe him a favor.

=== Season 2 ===
Valchek pushes for an investigation into corruption at the docks, due to his petty feud with stevedore union treasurer Frank Sobotka. Both men want to donate stained glass windows to a local church, and Sobotka refuses to withdraw his larger, more expensive window which had been installed first. Curious as to how the struggling union can afford the window, Valchek has the cops in his district harass Sobotka and his union, having Ellis Carver ticket their cars for minor infractions and pulling them over for "random" DUI checkpoints directly outside the bar they frequent. The union steals Valchek's expensive surveillance van and ships it from port to port, sending him photographs from each destination.

Valchek engages in a conversation with Krawczyk, who is aware of Sobotka's significant campaign contributions. Valchek suspects potential illegal activity and, at the same time, takes note of Burrell's nomination for Acting Commissioner. Recognizing Burrell's struggle to garner support from the first district council members, Valchek proposes a deal. He offers Burrell political influence in exchange for a specialized unit dedicated to investigating Sobotka, with Prez at the helm of the investigation. Burrell agrees to Valchek’s terms and creates a special investigative detail, although he allows Rawls to staff the detail with ineffectual castoffs from other police units. Observing the lack of diligence from the task force, Valchek threatens to withdraw his political support and coerces Burrell into providing him with a genuine police detail led by Daniels.

As the investigation broadens to include Greek drug traffickers, Sobotka loses prominence as the primary target. An infuriated Valchek turns to the FBI to redirect the focus of the investigation, but the Bureau remains more fixated on the union than Sobotka. Frustrated, Valchek confronts Daniels' team, leading to a physical altercation with Prez who, in response to Valchek's insults and shoving, punches him in the face. Enraged, Valchek disowns Prez and threatens him with dismissal from the BPD. Daniels manages to persuade Valchek to lessen Prez's punishment, highlighting that any official action would have to acknowledge Valchek's provocation. Reluctantly, Valchek assigns Prez to a two-month stint on the midnight shift at the district's narcotics unit and accepts a written apology to avoid pressing charges.

The FBI’s investigation, triggered by Valchek’s tip, triggered a cascade of devastating events for the community. It caused the union to lose all political support in the Maryland state house as it came under investigation. That lobbying was secured with funds Sobotka got from aiding The Greeks’ smuggling operation, and was intended to get funding for a project to dredge part of the Baltimore harbor, something desperately needed to improve the conditions of the local working class who is depicted throughout the season as being in economic collapse. When the investigation ends, Valchek delights in personally arresting Sobotka and holds him in the union offices until he can be perp walked. The tip also triggered a conversation between the FBI and Sobotka regarding his son Ziggy, who had murdered a fencer working for The Greeks.

A mole for The Greeks inside the FBI, Agent Koutros, tipped off The Greeks about the conversation, right as Sobotka went to meet with them, triggering Sobotka’s murder. The surveillance van is still being shipped around the world. Although Valchek greatly hates Sobotka during the whole season, after Sobotka's death he whispers "Spoczywaj w pokoju" (Polish for "rest in peace").

=== Season 3 ===
Valchek sets up a meeting between Burrell and Tommy Carcetti, a city councilman from Valchek's district, knowing that Carcetti is doing deals behind Mayor Clarence Royce's back. When Royce pressures the BPD to lower crime rates in each district, Valchek announces plans to increase foot patrols in his district's housing projects, use more of his flex squads, request more overtime and "juke the stats" if all else fails.

Valchek is surprised and amused when Major Howard "Bunny" Colvin confronts Rawls and questions how to juke the stats with regard to dead bodies. He is amused by Colvin's proposal of drug legalization (ostensibly as a joke) to decrease the felonies in the Western District. Later, while pursuing a suspect, Prez accidentally kills a black plain clothes officer. Despite disowning him earlier, Valchek uses his influence to have the charges dismissed.

=== Season 4 ===
After Thomas "Herc" Hauk, a member of Royce's security detail, catches the mayor receiving fellatio from a secretary, Valchek mentors him in exploiting the situation. After following Valchek's advice, Herc is promoted to sergeant. Valchek supports Carcetti for mayor and leaks information about the murder of a state's witness that helps Carcetti best Royce in a debate. When Valchek leaks the news that Burrell has assigned rookie Kima Greggs on the state's witness case, the fallout leads to Royce deciding to fire Burrell as commissioner. Before this happens, Carcetti is elected Mayor and Burrell retains his position.

Carcetti notifies Rawls that Valchek will be promoted to Deputy Commissioner of Administration as a reward for his loyalty. Carcetti urges Rawls to ensure that Valchek doesn't cause any trouble. During the promotion ceremony, Valchek's wife Kate and daughter Joan attend, but Prez is noticeably absent. As power within the department shifts and Carcetti plans to remove Burrell, Valchek points out to Rawls that Daniels, now holding the rank of Colonel, is a likely candidate to replace Burrell as Commissioner due to his race.

=== Season 5 ===
Valchek leaks the BPD's statistics on increased crime to Mayor Carcetti, urging that both Burrell and Rawls be fired. He also suggests that Carcetti promote him to Acting Commissioner until Daniels or another African-American is named to the permanent post. Carcetti and assistant Norman Wilson both agree that Valchek cannot deal with pressure from the City Council and the minister's alliance, even on an acting basis, but keep the statistics nonetheless. It is later revealed that Valchek is a prime source for Baltimore Sun reporter Roger Twigg.

Facing budget constraints and unable to take disciplinary action for an increase in crime rates, Carcetti opts to give Burrell a pass as long as honest statistics are provided. Burrell, unaware that Valchek has already released the actual crime stats, submits manipulated figures showing no change in the crime rate. Seizing this opportunity, Carcetti uses the doctored stats to terminate Burrell. To mitigate potential backlash from black voters, Carcetti strategically leaks a story to the Sun with Daniels' photograph, suggesting a consideration for a change in commissioner.

In the series finale, Daniels is named Commissioner but resigns to prevent an FBI case against him from going public. Valchek is then promoted to the position of Commissioner (with a full five-year term) by new mayor Nerese Campbell. Valchek is not well regarded for his police work throughout the BPD, as mentioned by Leandor Sydnor when he visits Judge Daniel Phelan to get some back-channel pressure applied to a case and mentions how the current police commissioner "doesn't have an idea of what police work is".
