= The Wire season 2 =

The Wire
- Season 2
- DVD cover
- Starring: Dominic West; Chris Bauer; Paul Ben-Victor; John Doman; Idris Elba; Frankie R. Faison; Larry Gilliard Jr.; Wood Harris; Deirdre Lovejoy; Clarke Peters; Wendell Pierce; Lance Reddick; Andre Royo; Amy Ryan; Sonja Sohn
- No. of episodes: 12

Release
- Original network: HBO
- Original release: June 1 – August 24, 2003

Season chronology
- ← Previous; Season 1 Next → Season 3

The second season of the television series The Wire consisted of 12 episodes and first aired in the United States on HBO from June 1 to August 24, 2003. It introduces the stevedores of the Port of Baltimore and an international organized crime operation led by a figure known only as "The Greek" and continues the story with the drug-dealing Barksdale crew and the Baltimore Police Department who featured in season one. While continuing the series' central themes of dysfunctional institutions and the societal effects of the drug trade, the second season also explores the decline of the American working class, and the hardship its members endure during the transition from an industrial to post-industrial society.

It was released as a five-disc DVD boxed set in January 2005.

== Summary ==
The second season continued to follow the police and those involved with the Barksdale drug-dealing organization. The returning cast included Dominic West as detective Jimmy McNulty, whose insubordinate tendencies and personal problems continued to overshadow his ability. Lance Reddick reprised his role as Lieutenant Cedric Daniels, who was sidelined because of his placement of case over career, but used his political acumen to regain some status. Sonja Sohn played Kima Greggs, who had transferred to a desk job, but could not resist the lure of a good case. Deirdre Lovejoy continued as assistant state's attorney Rhonda Pearlman, the legal liaison between the detail and the courthouse.

Wood Harris and Lawrence Gilliard Jr. reprised their roles as newly incarcerated drug dealers Avon and D'Angelo Barksdale. Idris Elba's character Stringer Bell took over the operations of the Barksdale Organization. Andre Royo returned as Bubbles, who continued to indulge his drug addiction and act as an occasional informant.

The police were overseen by two commanding officers who are concerned with politics and promoting their own careers: Colonel William Rawls (John Doman) and Acting Commissioner Ervin Burrell (Frankie Faison). Wendell Pierce portrayed homicide detective Bunk Moreland, who became more involved with the core case. Previously recurring guest star Clarke Peters joined the starring cast and his character, veteran detective Lester Freamon, joined the homicide unit as Moreland's new partner.

The new season also introduced a further group of characters working in the Baltimore port area, including Spiros "Vondas" Vondopoulos (Paul Ben-Victor), Beadie Russell (Amy Ryan), and Frank Sobotka (Chris Bauer). Vondas was the underboss of a global smuggling operation, Russell an inexperienced Port Authority officer and single mother thrown in at the deep end of a multiple homicide investigation, and Sobotka a union leader who turned to crime in order to raise funds to save his union.

Also joining the show in season two were recurring characters Nick Sobotka (Pablo Schreiber), Frank's nephew; Ziggy Sobotka (James Ransone), Frank's troubled son; and "The Greek" (Bill Raymond), Vondas' mysterious boss.

Returning guest stars included: Jim True-Frost as Detective Roland "Prez" Pryzbylewski; Seth Gilliam as newly promoted Sergeant Ellis Carver; Domenick Lombardozzi as errant Detective Thomas "Herc" Hauk; J. D. Williams as Barksdale crew chief Bodie Broadus; and Michael K. Williams as renowned stick-up man Omar Little.

== Cast ==
=== Main cast ===
- Dominic West as James "Jimmy" McNulty (12 episodes), a BPD marine officer whose boring job is disrupted by the discovery of a body in the Patapsco River.
- Chris Bauer as Francis "Frank" Sobotka (12 episodes), the secretary-treasurer of the local stevedore's union who allows criminals to use his business for smuggling.
- Paul Ben-Victor as Spiros "Vondas" Vondopoulos (10 episodes), the collected underboss of a powerful crime organization that works with the stevedores.
- John Doman as William Rawls (8 episodes), a BPD colonel who is forced to choose between his hatred for McNulty and his desire for case clearances.
- Idris Elba as Russell "Stringer" Bell (11 episodes), the intelligent and business-minded acting boss of the Barksdale Organization who seeks to keep it afloat financially.
- Frankie Faison as Ervin Burrell (5 episodes), the BPD's acting commissioner.
- Lawrence Gilliard Jr. as D'Angelo Barksdale (5 episodes), Avon's sensitive nephew who, while in prison with him, finds himself disillusioned with his life of crime.
- Wood Harris as Avon Barksdale (8 episodes), the imprisoned boss of the Barksdale Organization that plots to get out early by any means necessary.
- Deirdre Lovejoy as Rhonda Pearlman (7 episodes), an assistant state's attorney who helps the detail.
- Clarke Peters as Lester Freamon (11 episodes), an intelligent BPD homicide detective and Bunk's new partner who teams up with Russell to solve a mass murder.
- Wendell Pierce as William "Bunk" Moreland (12 episodes), an intelligent BPD homicide detective and McNulty's former partner who teams up with Russell to solve a mass murder.
- Lance Reddick as Cedric Daniels (12 episodes), an evidence control officer and former lieutenant who is approached to run a detail on Sobotka.
- Andre Royo as Reginald "Bubbles" Cousins (4 episodes), a friendly heroin addict whom McNulty tasks with locating a feared criminal.
- Amy Ryan as Beatrice "Beadie" Russell (12 episodes), an MDTA officer who discovers several bodies in a shipping container.
- Sonja Sohn as Shakima "Kima" Greggs (10 episodes), a BPD narcotics detective who finds herself frustrated with her domestic life.

== Episodes ==
No. overall	No. in season	Title	Directed by	Written by	Original release date	U.S. viewers (millions)
14	1	"Ebb Tide"	Ed Bianchi	Story by : David Simon & Ed Burns; Teleplay by : David Simon	June 1, 2003	4.43
Epigraph: "Ain't never gonna be what it was." -Little Big Roy McNulty finds a woman's body in the Port of Baltimore, but Rawls passes the case to county police because she was found east of the Key Bridge. McNulty studies tide charts to prove she landed west, getting the case sent back to the BPD, and is asked by Bunk to find Omar to testify in Bird Hilton's upcoming murder trial. Avon turns a supplier in to the DEA for a lighter prison sentence, causing his New York contacts to cut him off. Stevedore union secretary-treasurer Frank Sobotka donates a window to a church to get a meeting with Barbara Mikulski and talk about repairing Silo Point. Stan Valchek (Note: A BPD major and Prez's father-in-law, first seen in "The Buys".) is enraged when he donates his own window too late. A container for "the Greek", a crime boss Sobotka helps with smuggling, is dropped off. MDTA officer Beadie Russell notices its broken customs seal and finds several dead women inside.
15	2	"Collateral Damage"	Ed Bianchi	Story by : David Simon & Ed Burns; Teleplay by : David Simon	June 8, 2003	3.50
Epigraph: "They can chew you up, but they gotta spit you out." -McNulty McNulty and Russell deduce through an extra bedroll that the harbor woman was in the container and notice a crushed air pipe, getting the case deemed a homicide and given to the partnered Bunk and Freamon. Daniels, stuck in an evidence room, plans to resign and become an attorney. Avon points Brianna Barksdale (Note: Avon's sister and D'Angelo's mother, first seen in "Cleaning Up".) to a drug contact in Atlanta. Wee-Bey Brice is harassed by guard Dwight Tilghman for claiming to have killed his cousin. (Note: As depicted in "Sentencing".) Sobotka's delinquent son Chester "Ziggy" Sobotka is denied a supply when he tries to sell drugs. Valchek is given a detail to investigate Sobotka by Burrell, now acting commissioner, in exchange for backing his promotion, while stevedore Thomas "Horseface" Pakusa steals his surveillance van. The Greek's lieutenant Serge Malatov follows the container's ship to Philadelphia and abducts Sam Choksey, the seaman who killed the women, who explains to the Greek that he prostituted them, killing one when she resisted before suffocating the rest. Underboss Spiros Vondas kills him.
16	3	"Hot Shots"	Elodie Keene	Story by : David Simon & Ed Burns; Teleplay by : David Simon	June 15, 2003	2.64
Epigraph: "What they need is a union." -Russell Omar returns and forms a new crew. The Philadelphia men refuse to speak to Bunk and Freamon, while Bunk and Russell discover that the women's container had sketchy paperwork. McNulty's ex-wife Elena gives him a separation agreement. Valchek is sent photos of the van being shipped around the country, and Prez, frustrated with the detail's laziness, tells him of Daniels's effectiveness. Valchek pressures Burrell into getting Daniels for him. Sobotka buys Davis's union support. Ziggy's cousin Nick, wanting to buy a house for his girlfriend, helps him steal a container of cameras, which they sell to Greek fence George Glekas. Through Stringer, Avon orders drug supplier "Butchie" to give Tilghman bad heroin to distribute, which several prisoners die from.
17	4	"Hard Cases"	Elodie Keene	Story by : David Simon & Joy Lusco; Teleplay by : Joy Lusco	June 22, 2003	4.33
Epigraph: "If I hear the music, I'm gonna dance." -Greggs Nick and Sobotka argue about their illegal activities, which the latter justifies by using the profits to help the union. Ziggy's theft starts a petty rivalry between him and checker Maui. Glekas asks the cousins to get chemicals for him, and a checker points them to a contact. McNulty orders Bubbles to find Omar, who approaches Bubbles himself. Avon rats on Tilghman to shorten the time until his parole hearing. Disturbed by the plot, D'Angelo refuses to do the same. Stringer has his already poor quality drugs diluted. Daniels picks Greggs and Herc for the detail. Both Daniels and Greggs's partners are upset with their new positions. Bunk, Freamon and Russell reveal to Sobotka that the women were murdered, leaving him horrified.
18	5	"Undertow"	Steve Shill	Story by : David Simon & Ed Burns; Teleplay by : Ed Burns	June 29, 2003	3.62
Epigraph: "They used to make steel there, no?" -Spiros Vondas Joe Stewart's (Note: The leader of Baltimore's East side, first seen in "Game Day".) nephew, Melvin "Cheese" Wagstaff, destroys Ziggy's car over unpaid drug debt. Nick learns that the chemicals are used to make cocaine. Russell presses her old boyfriend Maui for information, who notes that the port's computer system could help her track containers. Freamon is added to the detail and recognizes Sobotka as connected to the dead women. Daniels adds Carver, believing he will not betray him again after being caught the first time, (Note: As depicted in "Sentencing".) and orders the detail to look into Sobotka's finances and the port drug trade. McNulty tracks trafficked women to New Jersey, but they refuse to talk about the dead woman for fear of deportation. Omar agrees to testify. Stringer's diluted drugs cause problems with sales, and his economics professor advises him to rebrand when he presents his situation as a hypothetical. Stringer, having an affair with Donette, (Note: D'Angelo's girlfriend, first seen in "The Detail".) believes D'Angelo is planning to snitch. Sobotka refuses to keep smuggling unless he meets with the Greek, who refuses his demands to quit and offers to triple his payment.
19	6	"All Prologue"	Steve Shill	Story by : David Simon & Ed Burns; Teleplay by : David Simon	July 6, 2003	4.11
Epigraph: "It don't matter that some fool say he different..." -D'Angelo Omar's testimony gets Bird found guilty, though he responds ambiguously when McNulty asks if he truly saw him kill William Gant. (Note: As depicted in "The Target.") Serge strong-arms his way into a meeting with Joe when asked for help, getting Cheese to compensate Ziggy for his car. The cousins deliver the chemicals and are paid. The detail finds no links between port drugs and the union, so Russell theorizes that they are making money via smuggling. She and Bunk learn how to operate the port computers and discover that Horseface moved the women's container. Greggs and Shardene Innes case strip clubs and learn that madam Ilona Petrovich controls several trafficked women. McNulty and Elena go to dinner, where he lies about reducing his drinking and they have sex. Brianna fails to convince D'Angelo to inform on Tilghman. Stringer has D'Angelo killed despite him taking his full sentence quietly, the death being staged as suicide.
20	7	"Backwash"	Thomas J. Wright	Story by : David Simon & Rafael Alvarez; Teleplay by : Rafael Alvarez	July 13, 2003	N/A
Epigraph: "Don't worry, kid. You're still on the clock." -Horseface At D'Angelo's funeral, Joe offers to share his drugs with Stringer if he shares his territory, which Avon rebukes when Stringer relays the deal to him. The cousins begin supplying drug dealer "Frog". Herc and Carver borrow a bug on a free trial and stash it in a tennis ball, but Frog tosses it and it is run over by a truck. Sobotka is horrified when he attends a seminar that advocates for automated port work and leans on the union's lobbyist to hurry his Silo Point efforts. Russell and Freamon use the computer to monitor Horseface sidelining a container for smuggling, which the detail follows to a warehouse and photographs Serge meeting with Joe. Greggs and Prez tail a van of trafficked strippers to an apartment building. Elena rejects McNulty's attempt to restart their relationship. Daniels resists Rawls's attempts to push the women's case to the detail, but they persuade him to take it, leaving Marla Daniels disappointed as he drops his career change.
21	8	"Duck and Cover"	Dan Attias	Story by : David Simon & George Pelecanos; Teleplay by : George Pelecanos	July 27, 2003	3.64
Epigraph: "How come they don't fly away?" -Ziggy McNulty goes on a bender and laments about wanting to work a case to Bunk. He informs Daniels, who convinces Rawls to put McNulty on the detail. Herc has his cousin pose as an informant so he can pay off Carver's bug debt with the reward money and legally tie Nick to Frog. The detail obtains wires after presenting their findings to Pearlman. After learning that the same company owns the warehouse and apartment, the detail suspects the latter is being used as a brothel and McNulty sets up a session after forcing a client to give up Petrovich's number. He almost sleeps with Russell, but leaves when he realizes she is a single mother. The stevedores convince Ziggy to fight Maui, who beats and humiliates him. He buys a duck and gains some popularity when he lets the stevedores feed it alcohol. After his unpaid phone is not shut off and he learns that Russell lied about being transferred, Sobotka realizes the detail is watching him and tricks them by sending a normal container to the Greeks. He calls Vondas, which gives the detail Vondas's number. Sobotka and the Greek agree to move clean containers for the time being.
22	9	"Stray Rounds"	Tim Van Patten	Story by : David Simon & Ed Burns; Teleplay by : David Simon	August 3, 2003	3.04
Epigraph: "The world is a smaller place now." -The Greek Bodie's crew gets in a shootout with rivals, accidentally killing a child. He throws their weapons over a bridge, but they land on a barge and are given to the BPD. Major Howard "Bunny" Colvin orders mass arrests, and Bodie goes free after seeing through the bluff that they have his fingerprints. McNulty infiltrates the brothel and the detail busts in to find him having sex with a pair of prostitutes. Petrovich is arrested. Terrance Fitzhugh looks into Glekas at McNulty's request, but finds that FBI agent Kristos Koutris, in league with the Greeks, has sealed his file. Vondas plans to go back to importing drugs rather than distributing them. Ziggy's duck dies from alcohol poisoning and Glekas agrees to buy a stolen shipment of cars from him. Stringer takes Joe's deal, prompting Avon to hire New York hitman "Brother" Mouzone to protect his territory.
23	10	"Storm Warnings"	Rob Bailey	Story by : David Simon & Ed Burns; Teleplay by : Ed Burns	August 10, 2003	3.51
Epigraph: "It pays to go with the union card every time." -Ziggy As the detail focuses on the Greeks, an annoyed Valchek calls the FBI, who agrees to split work with the detail if they focus on Sobotka. Valchek tries to take Prez off the detail while mocking Daniels, prompting Prez to hit him. Koutris warns the Greeks of FBI involvement and Vondas disposes of his phone, which Bunk and McNulty witness. Cheese is shot by Mouzone when he moves to his new territory. Joe asks Butchie to set up a meeting between Stringer and Omar. Sobotka plans to run for treasurer again despite promising the position to another stevedore. Glekas shorts Ziggy his payment for the cars and beats him when he protests, prompting Ziggy to kill him and be arrested. Vondas orders the Greeks to wipe the warehouse after Glekas's death, an order which the detail intercepts but is powerless to stop.
24	11	"Bad Dreams"	Ernest Dickerson	Story by : David Simon & George Pelecanos; Teleplay by : George Pelecanos	August 17, 2003	3.70
Epigraph: "I need to get clean." -Sobotka The detail arrests several Greeks and stevedores, including Sobotka. They leave Vondas on the street and have Russell tail him, mistaking his lawyer for the Greek while McNulty unwittingly catches the real one in a photograph. Stringer convinces Omar that Mouzone helped kill Brandon Wright, (Note: As depicted in "The Wire".) so he breaks into his motel room and shoots him. Mouzone convinces him that he is innocent. Ziggy bitterly expresses his hatred of Sobotka prioritizing the union over him when he visits him in jail. As his arrest tanks his run for treasurer, Sobotka agrees to cooperate with the detail so long as no stevedores are implicated. He goes to meet with Vondas and the Greek to get Ziggy freed, only for Koutris to call them as he arrives to relay that he met with the FBI.
25	12	"Port in a Storm"	Robert F. Colesberry	Story by : David Simon & Ed Burns; Teleplay by : David Simon	August 24, 2003	4.48
Epigraph: "Business. Always business." -The Greek Sobotka's body is found in the harbor and Nick's father forces him to turn himself in. He identifies the Greek in McNulty's photo and mentions Choksey. Bunk and Russell pull Philadelphia footage and find Serge chasing him, which they use to make him explain how the women died. He gives up Vondas and the Greek, but they have already left the country. Fitzhugh realizes that Koutris protected the Greek in exchange for tips to aid the war on terror. Joe takes over Sobotka's role with the Greeks. The union is shut down for voting Sobotka as treasurer, while Davis breaks ground on a condo that will replace Silo Point. Mouzone deduces that Stringer set him up. Herc and Carver transfer to Colvin's unit after being left to uselessly monitor Nick for hours. Daniels saves Prez's job by pointing out that he was provoked by Valchek, who receives a picture of the van in Australia and bids Sobotka a solemn goodbye. Bubbles and Johnny Weeks are arrested for stealing morphine and inform on Joe and Stringer's dealings to go free, who McNulty and Greggs photograph meeting. They convince Daniels to shift the detail's focus to them. Nick is placed in witness protection. Unable to find work at the docks, he stares mournfully at them from behind a fence, then walks away as it starts to rain.

== Reception ==
On Metacritic, the second season achieved an aggregate score of 95 out of 100, indicating universal acclaim. On Rotten Tomatoes, the season has an approval rating of 95% with an average score of 8.8/10 based on 21 reviews. The website's critical consensus reads, "An ambitious introduction to a new network of characters allows The Wire to expand its focus on societal ills."

=== Awards and nominations ===
20th TCA Awards

- Nomination for Outstanding Achievement in Drama
