= List of The Wire episodes =

The Wire is an American television drama series created by David Simon that premiered on HBO in the United States on June 2, 2002, and ended on March 9, 2008. 60 episodes aired over the show's five seasons, plus three additional prequel shorts. Each episode has a running time of 55–60 minutes (except for the series finale, which has a running time of 93 minutes).

The Wire is set in Baltimore, Maryland; each season of the series expands its focus on a different part of the city. The show features a large ensemble cast; many characters are only featured prominently in a single season. A group of characters, mainly in the Baltimore Police Department, appear in every season.

The show is available on DVD in Region 1, 2 and 4.

== Series overview ==
Season	Episodes	Originally released	
Season	Episodes	First released	Last released
1	13	June 2, 2002	September 8, 2002
2	12	June 1, 2003	August 24, 2003
3	12	September 19, 2004	December 19, 2004
4	13	September 10, 2006	December 10, 2006
5	10	January 6, 2008	March 9, 2008

== Episodes ==
=== Season 1 (2002) ===
No. overall	No. in season	Title	Directed by	Written by	Original release date	U.S. viewers (millions)
1	1	"The Target"	Clark Johnson	Story by : David Simon & Ed Burns; Teleplay by : David Simon	June 2, 2002	3.70
2	2	"The Detail"	Clark Johnson	Story by : David Simon & Ed Burns; Teleplay by : David Simon	June 9, 2002	2.80
3	3	"The Buys"	Peter Medak	Story by : David Simon & Ed Burns; Teleplay by : David Simon	June 16, 2002	N/A
4	4	"Old Cases"	Clement Virgo	Story by : David Simon & Ed Burns; Teleplay by : David Simon	June 23, 2002	2.91
5	5	"The Pager"	Clark Johnson	Story by : David Simon & Ed Burns; Teleplay by : Ed Burns	June 30, 2002	2.97
6	6	"The Wire"	Ed Bianchi	Story by : David Simon & Ed Burns; Teleplay by : David Simon	July 7, 2002	2.98
7	7	"One Arrest"	Joe Chappelle	Story by : David Simon & Ed Burns; Teleplay by : Rafael Alvarez	July 21, 2002	4.12
8	8	"Lessons"	Gloria Muzio	Story by : David Simon & Ed Burns; Teleplay by : David Simon	July 28, 2002	3.31
9	9	"Game Day"	Milčo Mančevski	Story by : David Simon & Ed Burns; Teleplay by : David H. Melnick & Shamit Choksey	August 4, 2002	3.42
10	10	"The Cost"	Brad Anderson	Story by : David Simon & Ed Burns; Teleplay by : David Simon	August 11, 2002	4.15
11	11	"The Hunt"	Steve Shill	Story by : David Simon & Ed Burns; Teleplay by : Joy Lusco	August 18, 2002	3.43
12	12	"Cleaning Up"	Clement Virgo	Story by : David Simon & Ed Burns; Teleplay by : George Pelecanos	September 1, 2002	3.66
13	13	"Sentencing"	Tim Van Patten	David Simon & Ed Burns	September 8, 2002	3.77

=== Season 2 (2003) ===
No. overall	No. in season	Title	Directed by	Written by	Original release date	U.S. viewers (millions)
14	1	"Ebb Tide"	Ed Bianchi	Story by : David Simon & Ed Burns; Teleplay by : David Simon	June 1, 2003	4.43
15	2	"Collateral Damage"	Ed Bianchi	Story by : David Simon & Ed Burns; Teleplay by : David Simon	June 8, 2003	3.50
16	3	"Hot Shots"	Elodie Keene	Story by : David Simon & Ed Burns; Teleplay by : David Simon	June 15, 2003	2.64
17	4	"Hard Cases"	Elodie Keene	Story by : David Simon & Joy Lusco; Teleplay by : Joy Lusco	June 22, 2003	4.33
18	5	"Undertow"	Steve Shill	Story by : David Simon & Ed Burns; Teleplay by : Ed Burns	June 29, 2003	3.62
19	6	"All Prologue"	Steve Shill	Story by : David Simon & Ed Burns; Teleplay by : David Simon	July 6, 2003	4.11
20	7	"Backwash"	Thomas J. Wright	Story by : David Simon & Rafael Alvarez; Teleplay by : Rafael Alvarez	July 13, 2003	N/A
21	8	"Duck and Cover"	Dan Attias	Story by : David Simon & George Pelecanos; Teleplay by : George Pelecanos	July 27, 2003	3.64
22	9	"Stray Rounds"	Tim Van Patten	Story by : David Simon & Ed Burns; Teleplay by : David Simon	August 3, 2003	3.04
23	10	"Storm Warnings"	Rob Bailey	Story by : David Simon & Ed Burns; Teleplay by : Ed Burns	August 10, 2003	3.51
24	11	"Bad Dreams"	Ernest Dickerson	Story by : David Simon & George Pelecanos; Teleplay by : George Pelecanos	August 17, 2003	3.70
25	12	"Port in a Storm"	Robert F. Colesberry	Story by : David Simon & Ed Burns; Teleplay by : David Simon	August 24, 2003	4.48

=== Season 3 (2004) ===
No. overall	No. in season	Title	Directed by	Written by	Original release date	Viewers (millions)
26	1	"Time After Time"	Ed Bianchi	Story by : David Simon & Ed Burns; Teleplay by : David Simon	September 19, 2004	1.83
27	2	"All Due Respect"	Steve Shill	Story by : David Simon & Richard Price; Teleplay by : Richard Price	September 26, 2004	N/A
28	3	"Dead Soldiers"	Rob Bailey	Story by : David Simon & Dennis Lehane; Teleplay by : Dennis Lehane	October 3, 2004	1.54
29	4	"Hamsterdam"	Ernest Dickerson	Story by : David Simon & George Pelecanos; Teleplay by : George Pelecanos	October 10, 2004	1.45
30	5	"Straight and True"	Dan Attias	Story by : David Simon & Ed Burns; Teleplay by : Ed Burns	October 17, 2004	1.34
31	6	"Homecoming"	Leslie Libman	Story by : David Simon & Rafael Alvarez; Teleplay by : Rafael Alvarez	October 31, 2004	1.42
32	7	"Back Burners"	Tim Van Patten	Story by : David Simon & Joy Lusco; Teleplay by : Joy Lusco	November 7, 2004	N/A
33	8	"Moral Midgetry"	Agnieszka Holland	Story by : David Simon & Richard Price; Teleplay by : Richard Price	November 14, 2004	1.47
34	9	"Slapstick"	Alex Zakrzewski	Story by : David Simon & George Pelecanos; Teleplay by : David Simon	November 21, 2004	N/A
35	10	"Reformation"	Christine Moore	Story by : David Simon & Ed Burns; Teleplay by : Ed Burns	November 28, 2004	1.67
36	11	"Middle Ground"	Joe Chappelle	Story by : David Simon & George Pelecanos; Teleplay by : George Pelecanos	December 12, 2004	2.04
37	12	"Mission Accomplished"	Ernest Dickerson	Story by : David Simon & Ed Burns; Teleplay by : David Simon	December 19, 2004	2.04

=== Season 4 (2006) ===
No. overall	No. in season	Title	Directed by	Written by	Original release date
38	1	"Boys of Summer"	Joe Chappelle	Story by : David Simon & Ed Burns; Teleplay by : David Simon	September 10, 2006
39	2	"Soft Eyes"	Christine Moore	Story by : Ed Burns & David Mills; Teleplay by : David Mills	September 17, 2006
40	3	"Home Rooms"	Seith Mann	Story by : Ed Burns & Richard Price; Teleplay by : Richard Price	September 24, 2006
41	4	"Refugees"	Jim McKay	Story by : Ed Burns & Dennis Lehane; Teleplay by : Dennis Lehane	October 1, 2006
42	5	"Alliances"	David Platt	Story by : David Simon & Ed Burns; Teleplay by : Ed Burns	October 8, 2006
43	6	"Margin of Error"	Dan Attias	Story by : Ed Burns & Eric Overmyer; Teleplay by : Eric Overmyer	October 15, 2006
44	7	"Unto Others"	Anthony Hemingway	Story by : Ed Burns & William F. Zorzi; Teleplay by : William F. Zorzi	October 29, 2006
45	8	"Corner Boys"	Agnieszka Holland	Story by : Ed Burns & Richard Price; Teleplay by : Richard Price	November 5, 2006
46	9	"Know Your Place"	Alex Zakrzewski	Story by : Ed Burns & Kia Corthron; Teleplay by : Kia Corthron	November 12, 2006
47	10	"Misgivings"	Ernest Dickerson	Story by : Ed Burns & Eric Overmyer; Teleplay by : Eric Overmyer	November 19, 2006
48	11	"A New Day"	Brad Anderson	Story by : David Simon & Ed Burns; Teleplay by : Ed Burns	November 26, 2006
49	12	"That's Got His Own"	Joe Chappelle	Story by : Ed Burns & George Pelecanos; Teleplay by : George Pelecanos	December 3, 2006
50	13	"Final Grades"	Ernest Dickerson	Story by : David Simon & Ed Burns; Teleplay by : David Simon	December 10, 2006

=== Season 5 (2008) ===
No. overall	No. in season	Title	Directed by	Written by	Original release date	U.S. viewers (millions)
51	1	"More with Less"	Joe Chappelle	Story by : David Simon & Ed Burns; Teleplay by : David Simon	January 6, 2008	1.23
52	2	"Unconfirmed Reports"	Ernest Dickerson	Story by : David Simon & William F. Zorzi; Teleplay by : William F. Zorzi	January 13, 2008	1.19
53	3	"Not for Attribution"	Scott Kecken & Joy Kecken	Story by : David Simon & Chris Collins; Teleplay by : Chris Collins	January 20, 2008	0.85
54	4	"Transitions"	Dan Attias	Story by : David Simon & Ed Burns; Teleplay by : Ed Burns	January 27, 2008	1.28
55	5	"React Quotes"	Agnieszka Holland	Story by : David Simon & David Mills; Teleplay by : David Mills	February 3, 2008	0.53
56	6	"The Dickensian Aspect"	Seith Mann	Story by : David Simon & Ed Burns; Teleplay by : Ed Burns	February 10, 2008	0.74
57	7	"Took"	Dominic West	Story by : David Simon & Richard Price; Teleplay by : Richard Price	February 17, 2008	0.57
58	8	"Clarifications"	Anthony Hemingway	Story by : David Simon & Dennis Lehane; Teleplay by : Dennis Lehane	February 24, 2008	N/A
59	9	"Late Editions"	Joe Chappelle	Story by : David Simon & George Pelecanos; Teleplay by : George Pelecanos	March 2, 2008	0.71
60	10	"-30-"	Clark Johnson	Story by : David Simon & Ed Burns; Teleplay by : David Simon	March 9, 2008	1.10

=== Prequel shorts ===
Three short film vignettes set prior to the series events were filmed during the fifth season's production. They were made available via HBO On Demand during broadcast of the final season, and included as extras on the complete series DVD box set.

- "When Bunk Met McNulty"
- "Young Omar"
- "Young Prop Joe"
