= The Wire season 3 =

The Wire
- Season 3
- DVD cover
- Starring: Dominic West; John Doman; Idris Elba; Frankie R. Faison; Aidan Gillen; Wood Harris; Deirdre Lovejoy; Clarke Peters; Wendell Pierce; Lance Reddick; Andre Royo; Sonja Sohn; Jim True-Frost; Robert Wisdom; Seth Gilliam; Domenick Lombardozzi; J. D. Williams; Michael K. Williams; Corey Parker Robinson
- No. of episodes: 12

Release
- Original network: HBO
- Original release: September 19 – December 19, 2004

Season chronology
- ← Previous; Season 2 Next → Season 4

The third season of the television series The Wire of 12 episodes first aired in the United States on HBO in 2004, from September 19 to December 19. It introduces Baltimore's local politicians and the upstart drug dealing Stanfield organization while continuing to examine the Barksdale Organization and the Baltimore Police Department.

The third season aired on Sundays at 9:00 pm ET in the United States to widespread critical acclaim. The season was released on DVD as a five-disc boxed set under the title of The Wire: The Complete Third Season on August 8, 2006, by HBO Video.

== Production ==
Following the death of Robert F. Colesberry, director Joe Chappelle joined the production staff as a co-executive producer and continued to regularly direct episodes. Baltimore Sun writer and political journalist William F. Zorzi joined the writing staff in the third season and brought a wealth of experience to the show's examination of Baltimore politics.

David Simon had originally hoped to create a city hall spinoff show, which would run in tandem with subsequent seasons of The Wire, and had even written scripts for it. But HBO declined, according to Simon: "HBO said, 'No, we only want one show that nobody is watching in Baltimore, not two!'."

== Cast ==
=== Starring cast ===
The third season returned with the focus on investigating the Barksdale Organization and introducing new characters such as the rival Stanfield Organization and local politicians. The returning cast consisted of Dominic West as Detective Jimmy McNulty, whose insubordinate tendencies and personal problems continued to overshadow his ability; Lance Reddick as Lieutenant Cedric Daniels, now commanding his own unit; Kima Greggs, played by Sonja Sohn, now McNulty's new partner within the unit; Clarke Peters as Lester Freamon; and Deirdre Lovejoy as Assistant State's Attorney Rhonda Pearlman.

Wood Harris reprised his role as incarcerated drug kingpin Avon Barksdale. Idris Elba's character Stringer Bell continued to run the Barksdale Organization in Avon's absence. Andre Royo returned as Bubbles, who continued to indulge his drug addiction and act as an occasional informant.

Deputy Commissioner of Operations William Rawls (John Doman) and Acting Commissioner Ervin Burrell (Frankie Faison), the two commanding officers, seem to be more concerned with politics and their own careers than actual police work. Wendell Pierce portrayed veteran homicide detective Bunk Moreland.

The new season saw several previously recurring characters assuming larger starring roles, including Seth Gilliam as Sergeant Ellis Carver, Domenick Lombardozzi as Detective Thomas "Herc" Hauk, Detective Leander Sydnor (Corey Parker Robinson), Detective Roland Pryzbylewski (Jim True-Frost), Bodie Broadus (J. D. Williams), Omar Little (Michael K. Williams), and Major Howard "Bunny" Colvin (Robert Wisdom).

Colvin commanded the Western district where the Barksdale organization operated, and nearing retirement, he came up with a radical new method of dealing with the drug problem. Herc and Carver joined the Western District Drug Enforcement Unit under Colvin's command. Sydnor, a rising young star in the police department in season 1, returned to the cast as part of the major crimes unit along with Pryzbylewski.

Bodie had been seen gradually rising in the Barksdale organization since the first episode; he was born to their trade and showed a fierce aptitude for it. Omar had a vendetta against the Barksdale organization and gave them all of his lethal attention. A new starring character was also introduced in the third season: Tommy Carcetti (Aidan Gillen), an ambitious city councilman.

Several members of the second season starring cast did not return for the third season with the change in focus and the termination of some characters' storylines. Chris Bauer (Frank Sobotka), Paul Ben-Victor (Spiros Vondas) and Amy Ryan (Beadie Russell) all left the starring cast with the third season. Ryan returned as a guest star for a short scene at the end of the season.

==== Main cast ====
- Dominic West as James "Jimmy" McNulty (12 episodes), an intelligent but egotistical BPD major crimes detective that becomes frustrated with his detail's constantly shifting focus.
- John Doman as William Rawls (10 episodes), the BPD's deputy commissioner who works with Burrell to try and keep the department's crime rates down.
- Idris Elba as Russell "Stringer" Bell (12 episodes), Avon's intelligent and business-minded underboss whose friendship with him frays under his desires to go legitimate.
- Frankie Faison as Ervin Burrell (10 episodes), the BPD's commissioner who desperately tries to keep the department's crime rates down.
- Aidan Gillen as Thomas "Tommy" Carcetti (12 episodes), a scheming city councilman who plans to run for mayor and regularly presses the BPD on their statistics.
- Wood Harris as Avon Barksdale (11 episodes), a drug kingpin who plots to take his territory back from a new competitor after being released from prison.
- Deirdre Lovejoy as Rhonda Pearlman (10 episodes), an assistant state's attorney who starts a relationship with Daniels.
- Clarke Peters as Lester Freamon (11 episodes), an intelligent BPD homicide detective who works with Prez to crack the Baltimore drug dealer phone network.
- Wendell Pierce as William "Bunk" Moreland (8 episodes), an intelligent BPD homicide detective who crosses paths with Omar while searching for an officer's stolen gun.
- Lance Reddick as Cedric Daniels (12 episodes), the lieutenant of the BPD's major crimes unit who frequently argues with McNulty over his leadership.
- Andre Royo as Reginald "Bubbles" Cousins (10 episodes), a friendly heroin addict who is torn between his best friend and providing the detail with information.
- Sonja Sohn as Shakima "Kima" Greggs (12 episodes), a BPD major crimes detective whose domestic problems become even more pronounced.
- Jim True-Frost as Roland "Prez" Pryzbylewski (9 episodes), a good-natured major crimes detective who works with Freamon to crack the Baltimore drug dealer phone network.
- Robert Wisdom as Howard "Bunny" Colvin (12 episodes), a major and the commander of the Western district, who develops an unorthodox plan to reduce violent crime in the area.
- Seth Gilliam as Ellis Carver (11 episodes), a BPD sergeant who works under and gives his full loyalty to Colvin.
- Domenick Lombardozzi as Thomas "Herc" Hauk (11 episodes), a BPD officer who works under Colvin and begins to doubt his decisions.
- J. D. Williams as Preston "Bodie" Broadus (11 episodes), a Barksdale crew chief.
- Michael K. Williams as Omar Little (10 episodes), an extremely dangerous robber who seeks revenge on Stringer after being manipulated by him.
- Corey Parker Robinson as Leander Sydnor (8 episodes), a BPD major crimes detective.

=== Recurring roles ===
Many guest stars from the earlier seasons reprised their roles. Proposition Joe (Robert F. Chew), the East Side's cautious drug kingpin, became more cooperative with the Barksdale Organization. His lieutenant "Cheese" (Method Man) became involved in the Major Crimes Unit investigation. Brother Mouzone (Michael Potts) returned to Baltimore looking for revenge. Hassan Johnson reprised his role as incarcerated Barksdale enforcer Wee-Bey Brice. Tray Chaney continued to portray Barksdale crew chief Poot Carr. Leo Fitzpatrick returned as hapless drug addict Johnny Weeks.

Michael Hyatt and Shamyl Brown reprised their respective roles as Brianna Barksdale and Donette with both characters dealing with the loss of D'Angelo Barksdale. Michael Kostroff returned as the Barksdales' retainered defense attorney Maurice Levy. Isiah Whitlock, Jr. reprised his role as corrupt State Senator Clay Davis, who continued to be involved with Barksdale money. Stringer continued to use Shamrock (Richard Burton) to insulate himself from investigation. Background characters like Barksdale enforcers Tank and Country also returned. Omar Little's crew continued to rob the Barksdale Organization and consisted of his boyfriend Dante (Ernest Waddell), partners Tosha Mitchell (Edwina Findley) and Kimmy (Kelli R. Brown), and advisor Butchie (S. Robert Morgan).

Many guest stars also reprised their characters from the police department. Returning guest stars in the homicide unit include Delaney Williams as Sergeant Jay Landsman, Ed Norris as Detective Ed Norris, and Brian Anthony Wilson as Detective Vernon Holley. Al Brown and Jay Landsman reprised their roles as patrol division officers Stan Valchek and Dennis Mello. Michael Salconi recurred as veteran Western patrolman Michael Santangelo.

New recurring characters in the third season were also spread between the Street and the Law. The upstart Stanfield Organization introduced several new roles: Marlo Stanfield (Jamie Hector), a ruthless leader seeking to challenge Avon's dominance; Chris Partlow (Gbenga Akinnagbe), Stanfield's chief enforcer; Felicia "Snoop" Pearson (Felicia Pearson), Partlow's protege; Norris Davis as rimshop owner and advisor Vinson; Brandon Fobbs as crew chief Fruit; and Melvin T. Russell and Justin Burley as young drug dealers Jamal and Justin. The Barksdale Organization also found several new recruits: Slim Charles (Anwan Glover), Avon's new chief enforcer; Bernard (Melvin Jackson Jr.), responsible for procuring disposable cell phones; and Dennis "Cutty" Wise (Chad L. Coleman), a newly released convict uncertain of his future.

The introduction of a political storyline brought many new characters. Glynn Turman played Mayor Clarence Royce, the incumbent whom Carcetti planned to unseat. Cleo Reginald Pizana portrayed Coleman Parker, Royce's chief-of-staff. Brandy Burre appeared as Theresa D'Agostino, a political campaign consultant. Frederick Strother performed as Odell Watkins, a state delegate and political king-maker. Christopher Mann played Carcetti's city council colleague Anthony Gray.

Several new police characters also debuted with the third season. Gregory L. Williams played Michael Crutchfield, a cantankerous homicide detective. Joilet F. Harris had a small role as Caroline Massey, a new officer in the Major Crimes Unit. The focus on Colvin's command of the Western District introduced several new characters both in Carver's Drug Enforcement Unit and in the Patrol Division. Carver's squad included Kenneth Dozerman (Rick Otto), Anthony Colicchio (Benjamin Busch), Lloyd "Truck" Garrick (Ryan Sands), and Lambert (Nakia Dillard). New rookie patrol officer Aaron Castor (Lee Everett Cox), Brian Baker (Derek Horton) and Officer Turner (Darrell M. Smith) also featured.

== Episodes ==
No. overall	No. in season	Title	Directed by	Written by	Original release date	Viewers (millions)
26	1	"Time After Time"	Ed Bianchi	Story by : David Simon & Ed Burns; Teleplay by : David Simon	September 19, 2004	1.83
Epigraph: "Don't matter how many times you get burnt, you just keep doin' the same." -Bodie Barksdale territory is razed by the city and Stringer decides to work with other dealers rather than fight for new ground. Barksdale soldier Dennis "Cutty" Wise is paroled after 14 years in prison and is given a bag of drugs for his loyalty. He gives it to "Fruit", a dealer for kingpin Marlo Stanfield, for a cut of the profits. Fruit loses it and threatens Cutty when confronted. The floundering detail hopes that Joe Stewart will promote his loud-mouthed nephew when they arrest a higher-up, but Cheese Wagstaff is promoted instead. Burrell warns Daniels that mayor Clarence Royce is stalling his promotion because a separated Marla is running for city council against Royce's ally. Royce suspects that councilman Tommy Carcetti plans to run for mayor when he presses Burrell and deputy commissioner Rawls on increasing crime rates. Colvin goes for a drive in his district and is disgusted when a young boy tries to sell drugs to him.
27	2	"All Due Respect"	Steve Shill	Story by : David Simon & Richard Price; Teleplay by : Richard Price	September 26, 2004	N/A
Epigraph: "There's never been a paper bag" -Colvin A medical examiner informs McNulty that D'Angelo's death (Note: As depicted in "All Prologue".) could have been murder, which he tells a disbelieving Donette. (Note: D'Angelo's former girlfriend and Stringer's lover, first seen in "The Detail".) Cutty takes a job as a landscaper. Marlo refuses to meet with Bodie when he is sent to talk business. Cheese is forced to put his dog down after it is wounded in a rigged fight, sparking several murders when he has the opponent's trainer killed. The detail mistakes him mourning the dog over the phone as admitting to murder, and the wiretaps go silent after his arrest and release. Pearlman sleeps with Daniels despite McNulty's attempts to be with her. Burrell admits to Carcetti that he is understaffed under Royce. Colvin's officer is shot while undercover and his gun is stolen. Colvin expresses desire for the option to look the other way on safe drug sales, which his men do not understand.
28	3	"Dead Soldiers"	Rob Bailey	Story by : David Simon & Dennis Lehane; Teleplay by : Dennis Lehane	October 3, 2004	1.54
Epigraph: "The gods will not save you." -Burrell Colvin selects three low population neighborhoods to push drug activity into, planning to make sales legal there. Carcetti repeats Burrell's issue in an interview, who Royce forces to take the scorn the news brings but allows him to keep his job for his loyalty. Bunk is tasked with finding the stolen gun, while McNulty investigates the room where D'Angelo died and concludes that suicide was impossible. He and Greggs are irate when Daniels switches the detail's focus to an easier target. Cutty informs his old girlfriend, schoolteacher Grace Sampson, that he has gone straight, but she gently rebuffs his advances. Fruit forcibly takes some of Bodie's territory for Marlo. Omar's boyfriend Dante accidentally kills his accomplice Tosha Mitchell in a shootout following a botched Barksdale robbery. Stringer has her wake guarded in case Omar shows up, who observes it from afar.
29	4	"Hamsterdam"	Ernest Dickerson	Story by : David Simon & George Pelecanos; Teleplay by : George Pelecanos	October 10, 2004	1.45
Epigraph: "Why you got to go and fuck with the program?" -Fruit Carcetti asks consultant Theresa D'Agostino to be his campaign manager, who dismisses his chances due to his whiteness. McNulty discovers Daniels and Pearlman's relationship, and after a drink with Daniels, he wishes them well. Bubbles gets Marlo's license plate for McNulty and Greggs, who pull his records and learn that he has a habit of killing witnesses. As Stringer tries to soothe Donette's worries about D'Angelo, he has a meeting with Davis and property developer Andy Krawczyk that McNulty spies on. McNulty gets Stringer's number from BCCC records, while Prez checks property records and finds that Stringer is building a legitimate developer business. Avon is granted parole. After learning that all his coworkers are felons, Cutty asks Barksdale enforcer "Slim" Charles for work.
30	5	"Straight and True"	Dan Attias	Story by : David Simon & Ed Burns; Teleplay by : Ed Burns	October 17, 2004	1.34
Epigraph: "I had such fuckin' hopes for us." -McNulty A deacon tries to help Cutty get into a GED program, but he leaves when Grace does not attend. He helps catch a Barksdale thief but is disturbed by the man being brutally beaten. Bunk learns from a witness that Omar was present at the shootout. Colvin shows drug lieutenants the "free zones" (who dub them "Hamsterdam") and has his men drop off people to freely do business. McNulty realizes that Stringer is funding the Barksdales with his venues. He meets and begins a casual relationship with D'Agostino. McNulty and Greggs observe Marlo rejecting Stringer's offer to join his alliance of dealers, the "New Day Co-Op". Avon is thrown a party upon his release, where Stringer shows him his new apartment.
31	6	"Homecoming"	Leslie Libman	Story by : David Simon & Rafael Alvarez; Teleplay by : Rafael Alvarez	October 31, 2004	1.42
Epigraph: "Just a gangster, I suppose." -Avon Barksdale The district becomes peaceful after dealers are pushed into Hamsterdam. Bunk asks Tosha's family to contact Omar, who leans on the witness to change his story. He goes to Bunk, who expresses disgust at the sense of community they had when they knew each other as children being gone. Daniels rejects Marla's proposal of reconciliation, but asks Pearlman to keep their relationship quiet for Marla's image. Carcetti manipulates his colleague Anthony Gray into plotting a mayoral run, then hires D'Agostino, believing Gray and Royce will split the black vote. Stringer bribes Davis to speed construction of his first property along. Donette mentions McNulty's visit to Brianna Barksdale. D'Angelo's investigation is closed because there is no suspect. Avon orders his men to take his corners back from Marlo. Cutty corners Fruit but is unable to kill him, deciding to retire for good with Avon's consent. Bubbles tells Greggs about the attacks, but Daniels is more concerned with her and McNulty's insubordination when she informs him. McNulty breaks chain of command by going to his old commander Colvin, who gets the detail's focus reassigned.
32	7	"Back Burners"	Tim Van Patten	Story by : David Simon & Joy Lusco; Teleplay by : Joy Lusco	November 7, 2004	N/A
Epigraph: "Conscience do cost." -Butchie Marlo feigns retreat to let Avon take over, then has soldier Felicia "Snoop" Pearson attack Poot Carr. (Note: A Barksdale soldier and Bodie's best friend, first seen in "The Target".) Barksdale phone mule Bernard is pressed by his bored girlfriend to hurry, breaking Stringer's rule to only buy two per store. Unsettled by Bunk's words, Omar finds the gun and has it sent to him. Carcetti confronts Royce on a murdered state's witness, who claims they had no money to protect him. Greggs is kicked out by her girlfriend Cheryl after claiming to have never wanted their baby Elijah. Daniels promises McNulty that he will be dropped from major crimes for his treachery after Stringer's arrest. McNulty pulls over Bodie and covertly takes his phone. Freamon and Prez discover that the phone has numbers pre-programmed into it. Carver imposes a tax on Hamsterdam's dealers and buys a basketball hoop for the local kids with the money, but it is quickly destroyed. Herc spots Avon on the street and informs the shocked detail. The episode is dedicated to Geraldine Peroni, who edited several episodes of the first two seasons and died shortly before the third season's premiere.
33	8	"Moral Midgetry"	Agnieszka Holland	Story by : David Simon & Richard Price; Teleplay by : Richard Price	November 14, 2004	1.47
Epigraph: "Crawl, walk, and then run." -Clay Davis Colvin's friend the deacon is unsettled by Hamsterdam and Colvin takes his advice to fund aid for the area. Cutty is shown an abandoned boxing gym and vows to repair it for the local kids. The detail pulls footage from the chain Bodie bought his phone from and trace Bernard's license plate to a rental company. McNulty gives Brianna evidence that D'Angelo was murdered and blames her for convincing him to go to jail. (Note: As depicted in "Sentencing".) Avon sends a woman named Devonne to seduce Marlo, but when they meet up again, his underboss Chris Partlow notices her talking to Avon nearby and shoots his car up. Stringer bribes a social services agent for Omar's grandmother's address and has men stake it out. He gives Davis another bribe to ensure he gets a federal grant. Avon accuses him of going soft and he spitefully reveals he had D'Angelo killed, insisting he did it to protect Avon.
34	9	"Slapstick"	Alex Zakrzewski	Story by : David Simon & George Pelecanos; Teleplay by : David Simon	November 21, 2004	N/A
Epigraph: "...while you're waiting for moments that never come." -Freamon McNulty gives up on pursuing a serious relationship with D'Agostino due to their intellect gap. Pearlman leans on the phones' manufacturer to secure a wiretap. Sydnor follows Bernard from the rental place as he buys and delivers phones. The detail gives Bubbles money to buy up Bodie's product and force a resupply. Stringer's men shoot at Omar and his grandmother as they leave for church, violating the universal "Sunday truce." Avon tries to convince Brianna that McNulty was lying to her when she confronts him. Cutty finds support in delegate Odell Watkins, who is allied with Marla and likes that the gym is in her district. Carcetti and Gray convince Watkins to fund witness protection. Carver finds a man killed by the Barksdales and drags the body out of Hamsterdam. Colvin threatens to close Hamsterdam to make the shooter turn himself in, and a disgusted Herc tips off the Baltimore Sun. Prez kills a black plainclothes officer on the street after mistaking him for a shooter.
35	10	"Reformation"	Christine Moore	Story by : David Simon & Ed Burns; Teleplay by : Ed Burns	November 28, 2004	1.67
Epigraph: "Call it a crisis of leadership." -Proposition Joe Marlo kills Devonne. Avon insists on continuing the war despite the Co-Op's plans to side with Marlo. Stringer learns that the grant was given to another company. The Barksdales ditch their phones, so the detail has Bubbles point Bernard to Freamon, posing as a shady salesman who sells him bugged phones. A reporter arrives in Hamsterdam, who Colvin convinces to hold writing about it for a week. Out of options, he admits to his superiors what he has done and promises to take the fall so long as his men are unscathed. Royce notes the positives of Hamsterdam when Burrell tells him about it. Cutty invites youths to the gym, but Marlo's dealer Justin angers him and he drives them away. After receiving advice to not let the kids fail, he apologizes to Justin. Brother Mouzone returns and has his bodyguard scope out gay clubs for Omar. Dante notices and attacks him but is subdued by Mouzone.
36	11	"Middle Ground"	Joe Chappelle	Story by : David Simon & George Pelecanos; Teleplay by : George Pelecanos	December 12, 2004	2.04
Epigraph: "We ain't gotta dream no more, man." -Stringer Bell Mouzone tortures Dante for Omar's location and goes to confront him, where Omar explains that Stringer set them both up. (Note: As depicted in "Bad Dreams".) Cutty secures funding from Avon and holds a match with another gym. His students are beaten, but he commends them, particularly Justin, for their effort and attitude. Royce leaves Hamsterdam untouched and Burrell suspects he is planning to blame it on the BPD. He asks Carcetti to pass the story to Gray, hoping he can use it to beat Royce. Carcetti talks to Colvin to get the full story, who has him observe Hamsterdam. D'Agostino pursues McNulty, who rebuffs her when he realizes she is looking for dirt on Colvin. McNulty uses a machine that records cell signals and uses it to get Stringer's number. Terrance Fitzhugh secures a quick wire by claiming to the FBI that Stringer is linked with terrorism. Levy tells Stringer that Davis is known for pocketing bribes, and the detail records him planning to kill Davis over the phone. Stringer gives Colvin Avon's address to end the war, while Mouzone threatens to cut off Avon's drug contacts unless he gives up Stringer. He relays Stringer's meeting with Krawczyk, where Mouzone and Omar reveal that Avon sold him out. A resigned Stringer allows them to kill him.
37	12	"Mission Accomplished"	Ernest Dickerson	Story by : David Simon & Ed Burns; Teleplay by : David Simon	December 19, 2004	2.04
Epigraph: "We fight on that lie." -Slim Charles Colvin passes McNulty Avon's location, who he arrests and tells that Stringer gave him up. Marlo attends Avon's prosecution and they see each other for the first time. McNulty pursues a relationship with Russell and rejects Daniels's request that he stay in major crimes, finding peace as an officer. Royce blames Burrell when the press discovers Hamsterdam, who threatens to pin it on Royce to save his job. Royce placates Watkins, demanding Burrell's firing, by offering support to Marla. With her career safe, Pearlman and Daniels, the latter taking Colvin's job, are free to openly pursue a relationship. Rawls has Hamsterdam raided, where Johnny Weeks (Note: Bubbles's best friend and fellow addict, first seen in "The Target".) is found dead of an overdose. At the subsequent hearing, Carcetti sets up his campaign with a rousing speech about the administration's failure to protect the city. Awaiting his hearing, Prez admits to Freamon that he never wanted to be a cop. Greggs misses a call from Cheryl while cheating on her. Grace again rejects Cutty but expresses pride at the good he has done, and he intimidates Fruit to get Justin to come back to the gym. Colvin approaches Bubbles in the wreckage of Hamsterdam and asks if it was a good idea. Bubbles responds ambiguously and they part ways.

== Reception ==
On Rotten Tomatoes, the season has an approval rating of 100% with an average score of 10/10 based on 21 reviews. The website's critical consensus reads, "In its third season, The Wire's taut, unflinching examination of Baltimore expands from the criminal underworld to the top of the political machine." The season holds a score of 98/100 indicating "universal acclaim" on Metacritic.

The Nielsen ratings for season 3 were substantially worse than season 2, generally averaging around 1–2 million viewers compared to season 2's 3–4 million viewers. David Simon later wrote that this apparent steep drop in popularity was an illusion: Nielsen changed their methodology in-between seasons to separate out viewers watching HBO sister channels (e.g. HBO2, HBO3, HBO Family, etc.) where before it had grouped all HBO watchers of any channel as watching whatever was on the main HBO channel. The ratings of seasons 1 and 2 were thus overestimated.

=== Awards and nominations ===
57th Primetime Emmy Awards

- Nomination for Outstanding Writing for a Drama Series (George Pelecanos & David Simon) (Episode: "Middle Ground")
