= Straight and True =

- The Wire episode
- Episode no.: Season 3 Episode 5
- Directed by: Dan Attias
- Story by: David Simon; Ed Burns
- Teleplay by: Ed Burns
- Original air date: October 17, 2004
- Running time: 58 minutes

Episode chronology
← Previous "Hamsterdam"	Next → "Homecoming"
- The Wire season 3

"Straight and True" is the 30th episode of the American crime drama The Wire, also the fifth episode of the show's third season. The episode was written by Ed Burns from a story by David Simon and Ed Burns, and was directed by Dan Attias. It originally aired on October 17, 2004, on HBO in the U.S. In the episode, the Baltimore Police continues its mission to restrict drug dealing to specific zones, while the Barksdale Organization celebrates Avon Barksdale being paroled from prison.

The episode had nearly 1.34 million viewers on its premiere.

== Plot ==
Bubbles and Johnny argue about the morality of acting as paid police informants. Johnny persuades Bubbles to run a short con with him instead of reporting to Kima Greggs. Once Johnny has the money, Bubbles is nowhere to be found. Meanwhile, Tommy Carcetti reads a story in the paper about a murdered state's witness. He shares it with Mayor Clarence Royce, who promises to act quickly. At a committee hearing, Gray confronts Burrell and Rawls about the witness, while Carcetti urges him to lay off.

At the ComStat meeting, Rawls questions Foerster about Dozerman's missing gun. At Homicide, Bunk canvasses for witnesses in the shootings and is told that Omar was present. In the Western, Colvin decides to coerce dealers and crew chiefs into moving their corner operations to an area known as Hamsterdam under threat of arrest for dealing elsewhere. Despite initially being unable to find any intelligence on the high-level dealers, Colvin gets what he needs when he is put in touch with the Major Case Unit.

Colvin orders his men to bring in drug lieutenants, telling Carver he can sympathize with their position as middle management. Carver and Herc are tasked with bringing in Marlo, but they find him surrounded by soldiers and refusing to move. Carver realizes the danger they are in and has them withdraw. Meanwhile, Officer Anthony Colicchio has picked up Bodie. Herc, Carver and Colicchio staff one of the Hamsterdam zones and are tasked with rounding up drug addicts, including Johnny, for the dealers.

Cutty returns to work checking on the dealer that Slim Charles suspects of stealing from the Barksdales. Cutty leaves the crew to meet an appointment with The Deacon, who tells him that he will have to work to find a job but that he can help him get into a GED program. Cutty, having thought Grace would be present, leaves the church. After snorting cocaine with Gerard and Sapper, Cutty is put in touch with an old man who helps him cheat a urine test. When Cutty's crew confronts the girlfriend of the suspected dealer, Cutty slaps her. However, Cutty is appalled when Gerard and Sapper later beat the dealer unconscious.

After chairing a meeting of the New Day Co-Op, Stringer Bell angrily admonishes Shamrock for taking down notes of the meeting. Later, Shamrock picks up the newly paroled Avon from prison. Bodie reports to a suspicious Bell about what is going on with Hamsterdam. After meeting with Marlo and failing to reach any compromise, Bell attends Avon's welcome party and talks business with Levy, Krawczyk, and State Senator Davis. Bell shows Avon his new apartment, telling him they have enough legitimate money to put whatever they like out in the open under their own names.

In the MCU, Bubbles tells Greggs more about Marlo's organization and names Chris Partlow as his chief bodyguard. He gives Greggs a disposable phone previously used by Fruit. McNulty continues following Bell and approaches him in his copy shop. Bell responds by brazenly offering to sell him a condominium in his development, to which McNulty states his disappointment as he had high hopes for their continuing game of cat and mouse. McNulty tells Prez and Freamon that Bell has become "the bank" - working legitimate businesses to produce funds to buy packages of narcotics for distribution that he will never touch. Greggs tracks down Marlo and finds Bell visiting him at his headquarters. Inside, Bell tries to persuade Marlo to join the Co-Op and is met with silent treatment. After Bell leaves, Marlo tells his people to gather weapons.

While attending an open house event at his sons' school, McNulty encounters D'Agostino doing fundraising work. The two flirt and end up having a one night stand, before D'Agostino tells McNulty off so that she can focus on her work. Meanwhile, Omar's crew prepare weapons for their next heist, and Omar warns Dante and Kimmy that they must get along or leave the crew.

== Production ==
=== Epigraph ===
I had such fuckin' hopes for us.

— McNulty

=== Credits ===
==== Starring cast ====
Although credited Deirdre Lovejoy does not appear in this episode.

==== Guest stars ====
1. Callie Thorne as Elena McNulty
2. Glynn Turman as Mayor Clarence Royce
3. Isiah Whitlock, Jr. as Senator Clayton "Clay" Davis
4. Chad L. Coleman as Dennis "Cutty" Wise
5. Jamie Hector as Marlo Stanfield
6. Michael Hyatt as Brianna Barksdale
7. Leo Fitzpatrick as Johnny
8. Delaney Williams as Sergeant Jay Landsman
9. Kelli R. Brown as Kimmy
10. Benjamin Busch as Officer Anthony Colicchio
11. Robert F. Chew as Proposition Joe
12. Jay Landsman as Lieutenant Dennis Mello
13. Ernest Waddell as Dante
14. Mayo Best as Gerard
15. Richard Burton as Sean "Shamrock" McGinty
16. Anwan Glover as Slim Charles
17. Addison Switzer as Country
18. Brandan T. Tate as Sapper
19. Brandy Burre as Theresa D'Agostino
20. Richard DeAngelis as Colonel Raymond Foerster
21. Christopher Mann as Councilman Tony Gray
22. Cleo Reginald Pizana as Chief of Staff Coleman Parker
23. Michael Salconi as Officer Michael Santangelo
24. Tony Cordova as Sean McNulty
25. Michael Kostroff as Maurice Levy
26. Melvin Williams as The Deacon
27. Michael Willis as Andy Krawczyk
28. Eric Ryan as Michael McNulty

==== Uncredited appearances ====
- R. Emery Bright as Community Relations Sergeant Richardson
- Gbenga Akinnagbe as Chris Partlow
- Ken Arnold as Auto Crime Lieutenant
- Robert Neal Marshall as Comstat Police Major
- Lawrence Cameron Steele as Western District Lieutenant
- Chester West as Shift Lieutenant Dent
- Troj Strickland as Fat Face Rick
- Mike D. Anderson as Ghost
- Unknown as Kintel Williamson
- Unknown as Mee-Maw
- Unknown as thieving Barksdale crew chief
- Unknown as Uniqua
- Unknown as Major George Smith
- Unknown as Bruiser
- Unknown as Tucky
- Unknown as Lil Mikey

=== First appearances ===
- Chris Partlow: Ruthless second in command of the Stanfield organization. First appears when Marlo tells him to get ready to go to war with the Barksdales.

== Reception ==
On its debut on HBO, "Straight and True" had nearly 1.34 million viewers, ranking third in Nielsen Media Research's U.S. premium cable ratings for the week ending October 17, 2004.

Alan Sepinwall praised the plot development in a 2010 review for HitFix: "...we see two huge leaps forward in reform campaigns being attempted on both sides of the law. Bunny finally manages to get Hamsterdam up and running by targeting the middle managers and not the grunts, while Stringer and Prop Joe unite most of Baltimore's major drug kingpins in their New Day Co-Op..." Sepinwall also observed "characters butting up against calcified, backwards thinking" in other subplots. In 2009, Simon Jeffery wrote a review for The Guardian analyzing characters' clothing choices, finding: "Clothes, for those high enough up the ranks, are important to the Barksdale crew," and: "On the non-unformed [sic] side, Carver's clothes become sharper, more fitted, more metrosexual as he moves up the ranks. His signature look is his police badge worn as a medallion."
