= Joy Lusco =

American film director

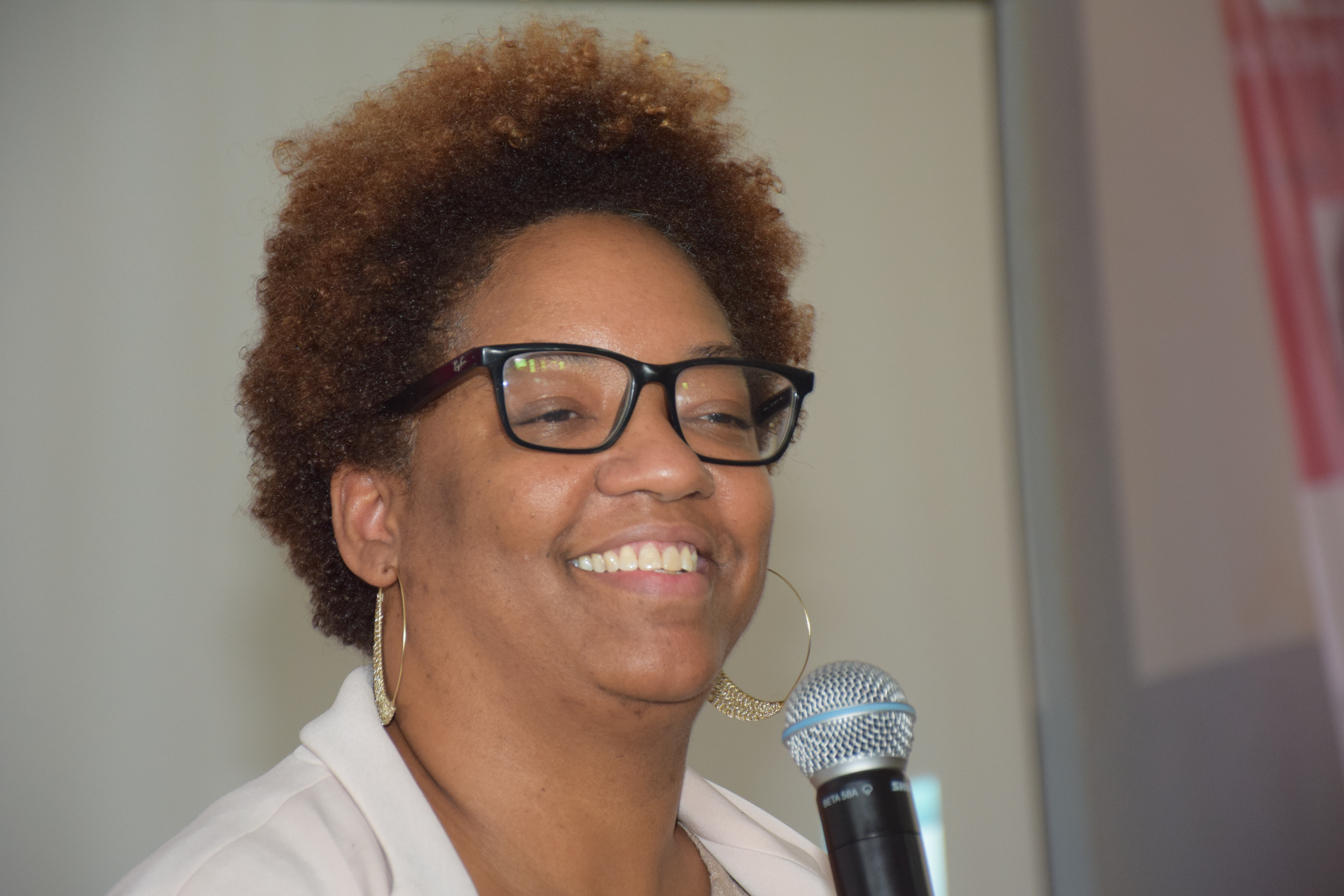
- Born: United States
- Occupations: Director, Producer, Television Writer
- Writing career
- Subjects: Documentary film Television drama
- Notable work: We Are Arabbers

Joy Lusco, also known as Joy Kecken and Joy Lusco Kecken, is an American film and television director and writer. She often works with her husband, Scott Kecken. They worked on the HBO drama series The Wire on four of the show's five seasons.

== Biography ==
Lusco moved with her family as a teenager to the Baltimore area. In 1995, while attending Towson University, she met her future husband Scott Kecken.

After graduating from college, she took an internship with the Baltimore-based television show Homicide: Life on the Street. Eventually she became a freelance writer for the show. In 1998 she wrote the teleplay for episode 6.23 "Fallen Heroes: Part 2." Later that year she wrote the teleplay for episode 7.08, "Kellerman, P.I.: Part 1."

In 1997 she and Scott Kecken began work on a documentary film on Baltimore's "arabbers" (produce vendors who work from horse-drawn carts). They also started a production company called The Film Foundry. The project was funded by grants from the Maryland Arts Council and the Maryland Humanities Council.

In 1998 she and Scott released the short film Louisville, starring Andre Braugher (Homicide), which was screened at 35 film festivals. It won best short at the New York Independent International Film Festival, a Jury Award from the Atlanta Film and Video Festival, and the Lumiere Award from the New Orleans Film and Video Festival.

In 2001 she was a member of the writing staff of The Division a show about an all-female detective squad for the Lifetime network. In 2001 she programmed the Women In Film and Video festival, Diverse Voices. She and Scott married in 2002. She worked with a Girl Scout troop in a video production on self-expression, Teen Voices.

In 2002 Lusco was a member of the writing staff and the script coordinator for the first season of The Wire. Lusco and The Wire creator David Simon had been writing colleagues for Homicide. She wrote the teleplay for the eleventh episode "The Hunt". She worked as a staff writer for the season of 2002, as well. She co-wrote the story and wrote the teleplay for the fourth episode "Hard Cases". She returned as a member of the writing team for the show's third season in 2004. She co-wrote the story and wrote the teleplay for seventh episode "Back Burners".

Lusco joined the Advisory Board of the Maryland Film Festival in 2003. She worked on Jim Sheridan's 50 Cent biography movie, Get Rich or Die Tryin' as a story consultant. Also in 2003 she worked as a story producer for the A&E reality TV series, Random 1.

In 2004 she and Scott had a son, Tawabi Kecken. The family settled in southern Pennsylvania. They continued to work on their documentary We Are Arabbers, which premiered September 9, 2004 at Villa Julie College. Lusco has said that the project gave her an insight into the "hard scrabble" nature of her grandparents' lives. That year she also released a short, Woman Hollering Creek, starring Larry Gilliard Jr. (The Wire); it was adapted from a short story of the same name by Sandra Cisneros. It screened at the Maryland Film Festival and the Boston International Film Festival.

In 2006 Lusco joined the writing staff of the short-lived NBC series, Standoff. She wrote episode 1.04, "Partners in Crime".

She has co-written a feature film, Maker of Saints, which is set to star Erykah Badu.

== Filmography ==
- Swagger (2023)
  - Episode 2.03 "RISE + FALL" Story and Teleplay (2023)
- Kindred (2022)
  - Episode 1.03 "Furniture" (2022) Writer
  - Episode 1.06 "Celeste" (2022) Writer
- Motherland: Fort Salem (2020)
  - Episode 1.05 "Bellweather Season" (2020) Writer
  - Episode 1.08 "Citydrop" (2020) Writer
- Cloak & Dagger (2019)
  - Episode 2.04 "Rabbit Hold" (2019) Writer
  - Episode 2.07 "Two Player" (2019) Writer
- Tales (2017)
  - Episode 1.07 "You Got Me" (2017) Writer
- Standoff (2006)
  - Episode 1.04 "Partners in Crime" (2006) Writer
- We Are Arabbers (2004) Co-Producer and Co-Director
- Woman Hollering Creek (2004) Writer, Co-Producer and Co-Director
- The Wire (2002)
  - Episode 1.11 "The Hunt" (2002) Teleplay
  - Episode 2.04 "Hard Cases" (2003) Story and Teleplay
  - Episode 3.07 "Back Burners" (2004) Story and Teleplay
  - Episode 5.03 "Not for Attribution" (2008) Co-Director (with Scott Kecken)
- The Division (2001) Writer
- Homicide: Life on the Street (1993)
  - Episode 6.23 "Fallen Heroes: Part 2" (1998) Teleplay
  - Episode 7.08 "Kellerman, P.I.: Part 1" (1998) Teleplay
- Louisville (1998) Writer, Co-Producer and Co-Director
