= Bubbles (The Wire) =

Fictional character from The Wire

- The Wire character
- Andre Royo as Bubbles
- First appearance: "The Target" (2002)
- Last appearance: "–30–" (2008)
- Created by: David Simon
- Portrayed by: Andre Royo

In-universe information
- Aliases: Bubbles; Bubbs; Bubs
- Gender: Male
- Occupation: Confidential informant; Recovering drug addict; Entrepreneur; Newspaper salesman; Soup kitchen volunteer
- Family: Grace; Beth; Aleah; Sydney
- Children: KeyShawn (son)

Reginald "Bubbles" Cousins is a fictional character on the HBO drama The Wire, played by actor Andre Royo. Bubbles is a recovering heroin addict. His real name is not revealed until a fourth-season episode when he is called "Mr. Cousins" and in the fifth-season premiere when he is called "Reginald". Bubbles has a son named KeyShawn, who lives with his mother. He is nicknamed "Bubbles" because when he is in a heroin-induced stupor, he tends to make bubbles with his spit.

Bubbles is a crucial police informant throughout the series due to his extraordinarily detailed knowledge of the streets of Baltimore and their inhabitants. Bubbles is an intelligent and compassionate man who genuinely cares about his friend Johnny Weeks and Sherrod, the teenager he informally adopts. Bubbles's struggle to deal with his addiction and make a better life for himself is a major sub-plot over the course of the series.

== Depiction ==
=== Season one ===
Bubbles is first seen as a homeless addict and best friend and mentor to Johnny Weeks. The two run a scam creating counterfeit money using a photocopier and coffee staining. Bubbles successfully uses the money to purchase drugs from a crew of dealers working for the Barksdale organization. However, when the money is passed on to D'Angelo Barksdale, it is recognized as fake. The next time they try the scam, a nervous Johnny is unsuccessful. He is stopped and severely beaten by the Barksdale drug dealers, who put him in the hospital.

Bubbles offers to inform on the Barksdale gang for Kima Greggs, to get some measure of revenge for Johnny's beating. Bubbles' knowledge of the street proves invaluable to Cedric Daniels' unit as they investigate the Barksdale organization. He helps identify the crew members who run the Barksdale pit and those who work in the high-rise towers. When Omar Little robs the Barksdale stash, Bubbles is present, and gives the license plate number of Omar's van to Greggs, which helps the detail track down the stick-up man.

After nearly being killed while trying to steal drugs, he tries to get off drugs, but reverts to his old habits when Kima gets shot: he pages Kima after she had promised to help him stay clean, not realizing that she is hospitalized with a life-threatening injury after a botched sting. As the police seek murder suspects, Bubbles is mistaken as a suspect and brutally beaten in custody by Vernon Holley until Jay Landsman and other officers restrain Holley, calling in Jimmy McNulty to clear things up.

=== Season two ===
McNulty recruits Bubbles to track down Omar when he's needed to testify as a witness in the William Gant murder. Bubbles grudgingly agrees, and in a nervous encounter with a shotgun-wielding Omar, delivers McNulty's message. At the end of season two, he is arrested by Michael Santangelo while trying to steal needles and morphine from an ambulance; in exchange for his release, he tips off Greggs and McNulty to the new alliance between Proposition Joe and Stringer Bell.

=== Season three ===
Bubbles is back to assisting the Major Crimes Unit once again. Bubbles is a former associate of Squeak, the girlfriend of Bernard, the runner assigned by the Barksdale gang to pick up their burner phones. Bubbles puts them in touch with an undercover Lester Freamon, allowing the unit to sell pre-tapped burner phones directly to the gang. During this time Bubbles' continued cooperation with the police starts to create a rift between Bubbles and Johnny, who encourages Bubbles to end his career as an informant. Eventually Bubbles leaves Johnny to fend for himself.

As the investigation progresses Bubbles begins to supplement the income he is earning as an informant by collecting discarded cell phones and T-shirts to sell out of a shopping cart; upon discovering Major Howard "Bunny" Colvin's "Hamsterdam" zones he expands his inventory to suit the needs of the dealers and addicts there. While in Hamsterdam, Bubbles also comes back into contact with Johnny and, upon recognizing that his friend's health was failing due to drug abuse, encourages him to leave – his fears are realized at the end of the season, when Johnny dies from an overdose.

=== Season four ===
Bubbles shares an abandoned garage with a teenager named Sherrod, peddling small goods from a shopping cart to support themselves. Sherrod has trouble with the arithmetic involved. Bubbles fails in his attempts to encourage the boy to return to school. After a brief fall-out, Sherrod returns to Bubbles. In Sherrod's absence, however, Bubbles has become the daily victim of another street addict who constantly robs him and beats him up. To stop this daily assault, Bubbles concocts a "hot shot" of heroin and sodium cyanide that he supposes the vagrant will steal from him and then consume.

However, Sherrod uses the tainted drugs while Bubbles sleeps and Bubbles awakes to find that Sherrod has died. Consumed by guilt and grief, Bubbles goes to the police and confesses his actions, before unsuccessfully attempting suicide in the Homicide interrogation room. Jay Landsman sees that the death was unintentional, and in an attempt to reduce the murder count in the city, has him sent to a state psychiatric facility rather than charge him with murder.

=== Season five ===
When the fifth season begins Bubbles has been clean for more than a year. He is living in his sister's basement with strict rules not to come upstairs or stay in the house unattended. Bubbles spends his days selling copies of The Baltimore Sun to make money. His Narcotics Anonymous sponsor is Walon. Walon encourages Bubbles to open up about Sherrod's death in meetings but Bubbles is not ready to take that step. Walon suggests that Bubbles should find an outlet elsewhere and Bubbles begins volunteering at a local Catholic Worker soup kitchen called Viva House.

Eventually Bubbles comes to terms with his role in Sherrod's death and has his life story published in an article in the Baltimore Sun. In his final scene of the series, he is seen being brought back into his sister's life when she allows him upstairs from the basement to have dinner with her and her child.

== Origin ==
Bubbles was based on a real police informant known as "Possum", whose true identity has not been made public at the request of his family. Possum was noted as having an incredible memory for faces, and was often very helpful in pointing out drug dealers to police. David Simon met with him twice, shortly before Possum's death from AIDS, intending to write an article about him. He ended up turning it into an obituary.

== Trivia ==
While filming, Royo was once approached by a Baltimore resident, who handed him a package of heroin and said he looked like he needed a fix. Royo calls this his "street Oscar."
