= Rafael Alvarez =

American author (born 1958)

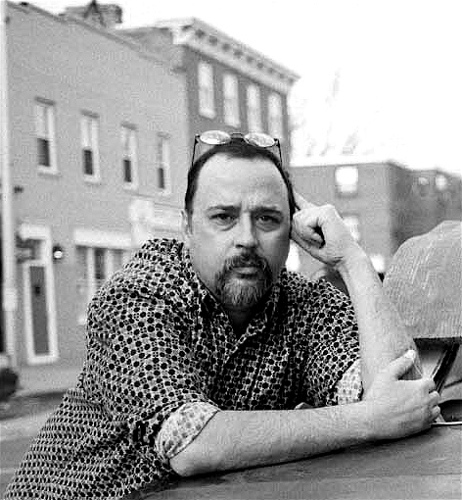
- Born: May 24, 1958 (age 68); Baltimore, Maryland
- Occupations: Journalist, screenwriter
- Writing career
- Subjects: Short fiction, Non-fiction
- Notable work: The Fountain of Highlandtown
- Website: Archived 2013-08-28 at the Wayback Machine

Rafael Alvarez (born May 24, 1958) is an American author based in Baltimore and Los Angeles. Alvarez went to work for the Sunpapers of Baltimore as a teenager—first in the circulation department and then the horse racing desk in sports—before landing on the City Desk as a utility man and neighborhood folklorist. He was with The Sun from 1977 through 2001. After leaving the paper, Alvarez worked on ships as a laborer before joining the staff of the HBO drama The Wire. He also worked on the NBC crime dramas Life and The Black Donnellys.

Among his many books are two short story collections—The Fountain of Highlandtown and Orlo & Leini; a history of the Archdiocese of Baltimore; two anthologies of journalism—Hometown Boy and Storyteller; and The Tuerk House, a history of Baltimore's pioneering drug and alcohol treatment center for the poor. In 2010, he was nominated for an Edgar Award for The Wire: Truth Be Told, an encyclopedic companion to the television series.

== Biography ==
The first of three sons of Manuel Rafael Alvarez and the former Gloria Jones, the author was born at St. Agnes Hospital in southwest Baltimore across from a former Catholic orphanage and reform school—St. Mary's Industrial School—attended by Babe Ruth. He was raised in suburban Linthicum and graduated in 1976 from Mt. St. Joseph High School. Alvarez is of Polish, Italian, and Spanish descent and was raised in a culturally Polish-American home. He is often assumed to be Hispanic, but he does not identify as such.

He returned to the City of Baltimore while attending Loyola College, buying a rowhouse on North Ellwood Avenue in East Baltimore in 1980. A decade later, he moved into his paternal grandparents' house on Macon Street in Greektown.

Alvarez began his journalism career in 1977, writing for a new Baltimore weekly—City Paper—while working in the circulation department of the Baltimore Sun, dispatching trucks. In 1978, he moved to the paper's sports department to compile horse racing results. In 1981, he was moved to the City Desk and learned to write obituaries while covering the police districts. He remained at the Sun through January 2001, when he took a buyout and went to work as a laborer on merchant ships.

The Sun has published two anthologies of his journalism: Hometown Boy (1999) and Storyteller (2001).

Alvarez also writes fiction and has had two collections of short fiction published: The Fountain of Highlandtown (1997) and Orlo and Leini (2001). The former includes the autobiographical short story "The Fountain of Highlandtown" which won the Baltimore City's Artscape Award for the short story. Alvarez is at work on another short story collection called Sea Stories. He credits his time as a journalist with providing him with a wealth of information to use in his fiction. He has also published the non-fiction anniversary book, First and Forever: The Archdiocese of Baltimore, A People's History. He contributed three short stories to the collection Out of Tune (2006). The project also includes stories by Alvarez's daughter Sofia, Baltimore musician Jason Tinney, Rosalia Scalia and Airin Miller.

In 2001, Alvarez left the Baltimore Sun and joined the Seafarers International Union with the intention of working on ships. He has since worked as a writer/producer on several television shows. Alvarez first worked in television as a freelance screenwriter on Homicide: Life on the Street contributing the teleplay for the sixth season episode "All is Bright". The show was based on a book by his former Sun colleague David Simon who was working as a producer on the sixth season in 1997 when Alvarez was hired.

Alvarez worked with Simon again as a writer on The Wire. He was credited as a staff writer for the second season. He contributed a teleplay for an episode in each of the first three seasons including "One Arrest", "Backwash" and "Homecoming". Alvarez also wrote a guide book on the series called The Wire: Truth be Told. Simon credits Alvarez with bringing a wealth of experience to their depiction of the Baltimore port in the show's second season. Alvarez described The Wire as similar to a Russian novel in that "the reader does the work for the first hundred pages, and then it turns and you're lost in it[.] With The Wire, it might be Episode 6 before it turns and you're in."

He left The Wire's writing staff after the show's third season. He now splits his time between Baltimore and Los Angeles. He worked as a writer and consulting producer for the gambling drama Tilt in 2005. He wrote the episode "Nobody Ever Listens". The series was cancelled while airing its first season. He worked as a staff writer and producer on Andre Braugher's FX cable mini-series, Thief in 2006. He worked on Paul Haggis' NBC drama The Black Donnellys in 2007. He was credited as a producer and wrote the episode "The Only Sure Thing". The series aired as a mid-season replacement and was cancelled after thirteen episodes.

Alvarez also wrote a pilot called Panic in Detroit for NBC. Based on this piece, they hired him to work on Life as a writer and producer. Alvarez co-wrote the episode "A Civil War" with series creator and show runner Rand Ravich. He left the crew of Life after the first season.

Since 2021, Alvarez has written columns for the local news website Baltimore Fishbowl.

== Work ==
=== Bibliography ===
- The Wire: Truth Be Told, Grove Press, 2010.
- Hometown Boy, Baltimore Sun, 1999.
- The Fountain of Highlandtown, Woodholm House Pub, 1997.
- Storyteller, Baltimore Sun, 2001.
- Orlo and Leini, Woodholme House Pub, 2000.
- First and Forever: The Archdiocese of Baltimore, A People's History, Editions Du Signe, 2006.
- Tales from the Holy Land, Perpetual Motion Machine Publishing, 2014.

=== Filmography ===
Writer

Year	Show	Episode	Notes
2007	Life	"A Civil War"	Season 1, episode 7 With Rand Ravich
2007	The Black Donnellys	"The Only Thing Sure"	Season 1, episode 6 With Mick Betancourt
2006	Thief	"No Direction Home"	Episode 4
2005	Tilt	"Nobody Ever Listens"	Season 1, episode 8
2004	The Wire	"Homecoming"	Season 3, episode 6 Story co-written with David Simon, teleplay by Alvarez
2003	The Wire	"Backwash"	Season 2, episode 7 Story co-written with David Simon, teleplay by Alvarez
2002	The Wire	"One Arrest"	Season 1, episode 7 Teleplay by Alvarez from a story by David Simon and Ed Burns
1997	Homicide: Life on the Street	"All Is Bright"	Season 6, episode 8 Teleplay by Alvarez from a story by James Yoshimura and Julie Martin

Producer

Year	Show	Role	Notes
2007	Life	Producer and writer	Season 1
2007	The Black Donnellys	Producer and writer	Season 1
2006	Thief	Producer	Mini-series
2005	Tilt	Consulting producer and writer	Season 1
2004	The Wire	Story editor and writer	Season 3
2003	The Wire	Staff writer	Season 2
