= Right as Rain (disambiguation) =

Right as Rain is a 2001 crime novel by George Pelecanos.

Right as Rain may also refer to:

- "Right as Rain", a song by Adele from the album 19, 2008
- "Right as Rain", a song by Alison Moyet from the album The Minutes, 2013
- "Right as Rain", a song by the band Collective Soul from the album Blood, 2019
- "Right as Rain", a song by the band Deus from the album Worst Case Scenario, 1994
- "Right as Rain", a song by the band Face to Face from the album Three Chords and a Half Truth, 2013
- "Right as Rain", a song by the Band from the album Islands, 1977
- Right as Rain, a 2007 album by the singer Gia Ciambotti
