= A Firing Offense =

1992 novel by George Pelecanos

- First edition
- Author: George Pelecanos
- Language: English
- Series: Nick Stefanos series
- Genre: Crime novel
- Published: 1992 (St Martins Press)
- Publication place: United States
- Media type: Print (hardback & paperback)
- Pages: 216 pp
- ISBN: 0-312-06970-7 (Hardcover first edition)
- OCLC: 24667198
- Dewey Decimal: 813/.54 20
- LC Class: PS3566.E354 F57 1992
- Followed by: Nick's Trip

A Firing Offense is a 1992 crime novel and the debut from author George Pelecanos. It is set in Washington, D.C., and focuses on marketing executive Nick Stefanos as he investigates the disappearance of a colleague. It is the first of several Pelecanos novels to feature the character and the first of a trilogy with Stefanos as the main character. The other books in this series are Nick's Trip and Down by the River Where the Dead Men Go.

== Plot ==
Nick Stefanos is a marketing executive for electrical goods chain Nutty Nathan's. When a stock boy from the company disappears he is convinced to locate the boy by his grandfather.
