= 1968 Washington, D.C., riots =

- Part of the King assassination riots
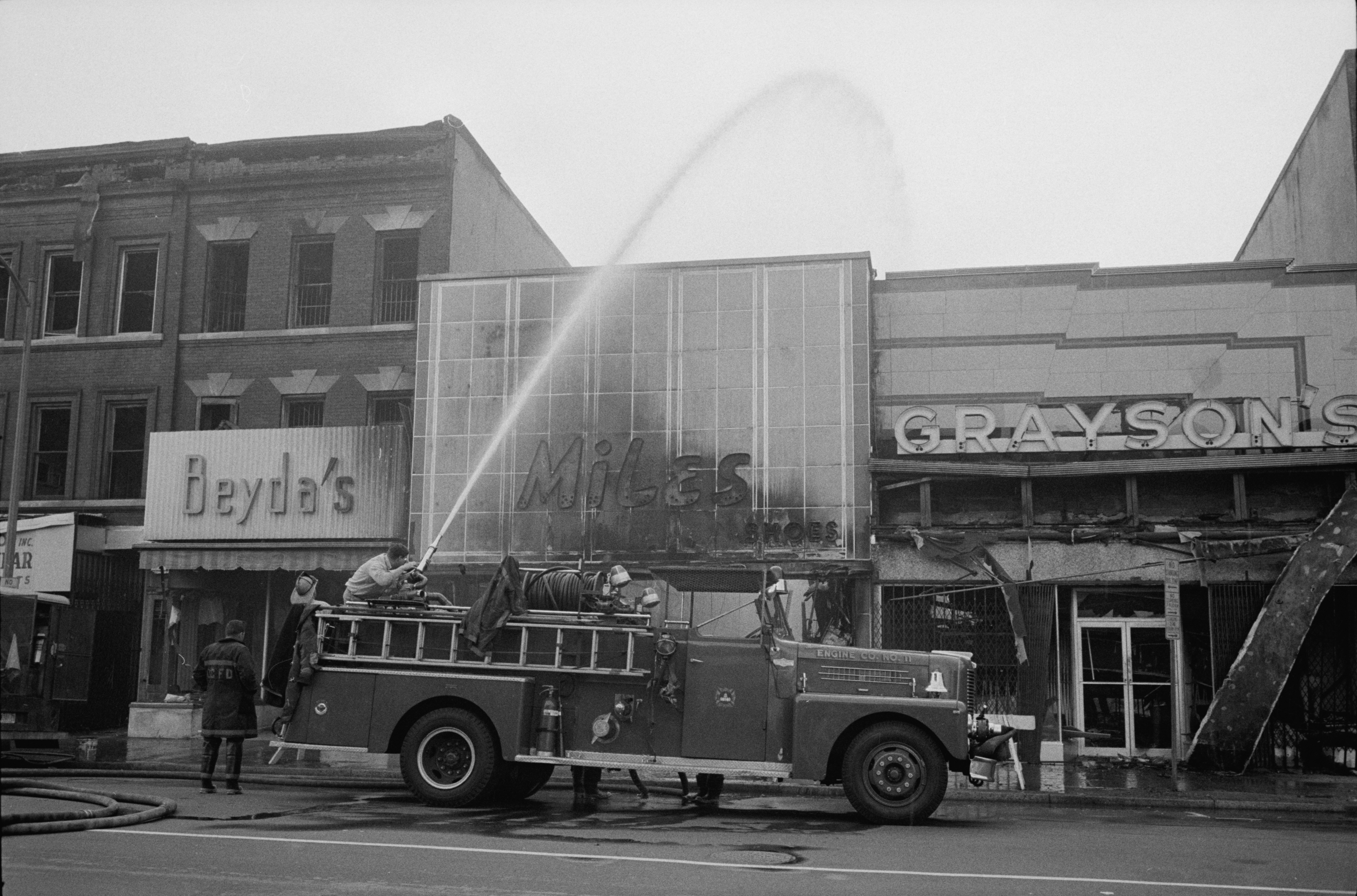
- A firetruck douses smoldering shops burnt out during the riots
- Date: April 4–8, 1968 (4 days)
- Location: Washington, D.C., U.S. 38°55′01″N 77°01′55″W
- Caused by: Assassination of Martin Luther King Jr.
- Methods: Rioting, race riots, protests, looting, attacks
- Result: Riots suppressed by federal troops and D.C. National Guard; Passage of the Civil Rights Act of 1968; Severe economic and structural damage to inner-city neighborhoods

Parties
U.S. government; United States Army Military District of Washington; D.C. Army National Guard; (Washington, D.C.) D.C. government; D.C. Metropolitan Police	Rioters

Casualties
- Deaths: 13
- Injuries: 1,098
- Arrested: 6,100+

Following the assassination of Martin Luther King Jr., a leading African-American civil rights activist, on April 4, 1968, Washington, D.C., experienced a four-day period of violent civil unrest and rioting. Part of the broader riots that affected at least 110 U.S. cities, those in Washington, D.C.—along with those in Chicago and in Baltimore—were among those with the greatest numbers of participants. As the unrest and damage to buildings went on, Lyndon B. Johnson ordered federal troops to enter the city in an effort to restore order. At the same time, Walter E. Washington announced a citywide curfew beginning at 5:30 p.m. By the evening of April 5, roughly 6,000 military personnel had been deployed throughout Washington, D.C., including soldiers from the Army, members of the Marine Corps, and troops from the D.C. National Guard. Ultimately, 13 people were killed, with approximately 1,000 people injured and over 6,100 arrested.

== Background ==
Starting in the late 19th century through the 1960s, the ready availability of jobs in the United States government attracted many people to Washington, D.C., including African American men, women, and children. This era is known as the Great Migration. As a result, middle-class African American neighborhoods prospered, but the lower class was plagued by poor living conditions and fell deeper into poverty.

Despite the end of legally mandated racial segregation after the 1954 decision of Brown v. Board of Education, the neighborhoods of Shaw, the Atlas District Northeast corridor, and Columbia Heights remained the centers of African-American commercial life in the city. The intersection of 14th and U Streets NW, often referred to as "Black Broadway," served as a cultural and professional hub, housing diverse businesses ranging from jazz clubs to pharmacies, as well as civil rights organizational offices.

== Pre-existing conditions ==
=== Housing ===
Housing in D.C. was deeply segregated. Most of the slums in the city were in the southern part of the city, and most of the inhabitants of these slums were black. The United States Commission on Civil Rights said in a 1962 report that housing was much harder to attain for blacks than for whites, and that the housing blacks could find within the city's border was in a severely worse condition (often alley slums) than the housing of their white counterparts. The Commission also stated that it was the United States Department of Housing and Urban Development's (HUD) segregationist zoning plot for the city that was to blame for housing inequality. HUD also came under fire from a group called ACCESS (Action Coordinating Committee to End Segregation in Suburbs) when they protested HUD for giving federal money to buildings that restricted blacks from living in them.

=== Education ===
Ghettoization resulting from housing discrimination led into a feedback loop of low property taxes and low funding for public schools in D.C., with many white parents sending children to private schools. Two-thirds of D.C.'s population was black, while 92% of public school children were black. Striking statistics such as one out of three ninth grade public school students ending up graduating gave way to rising frustration from the black majority towards the white-dominated government and only gave way to louder and louder calls for their demands to be met. The federal government granted $5.5 million under Title 1 of the Elementary and Secondary Education Act, however there were still many schools serving a majority of students in poverty that did not receive additional Title I funds.

=== Police ===
With 80% of the D.C. police force being white and 67% of the city being black, tension between police and the community rose along with tension between whites and blacks before 1968. Harsh police tactics, which started in the South in the 1960s to put a buffer on civil rights protests, left inner-city nationwide blacks more scared of police than ever. In the years leading up to 1968, there were many incidents in which D.C.'s black community held protests and turned angry against white police officers. In 1965, the same time and place as Dr. Martin Luther King Jr. worked with white lawmakers to pass the Voting Rights Act of 1965, two white D.C. police officers arrested a group of black boys with ages ranging from 12 to 16 for playing basketball in an alley. This prompted majority black crowds to gather around police stations around the city throwing rocks and, in some cases, firecrackers. These small, disorderly protests would happen multiple times before the end of 1965.

There were three programs put in place after a long string of controversial arrests of black people by white police officers:

1. A police run Department of Community Relations.
2. A civilian-run Advisory Council for every precinct.
3. A Complaint Review Board made up of civilians that would look over complaints thrown out by the police chief and see if the complaint warranted a look at a repeal by the mayor.

In 1968, before the riots began, a popular black D.C. reverend said that relations between black residents and white cops had reached a "danger point."

=== Unemployment ===
In June 1967, the national unemployment rate was 4% for white Americans and 8.4% for non-white Americans. In D.C., non-white unemployment was over 30% for much of the 1960s, many times higher than national rates.

== Course of events ==
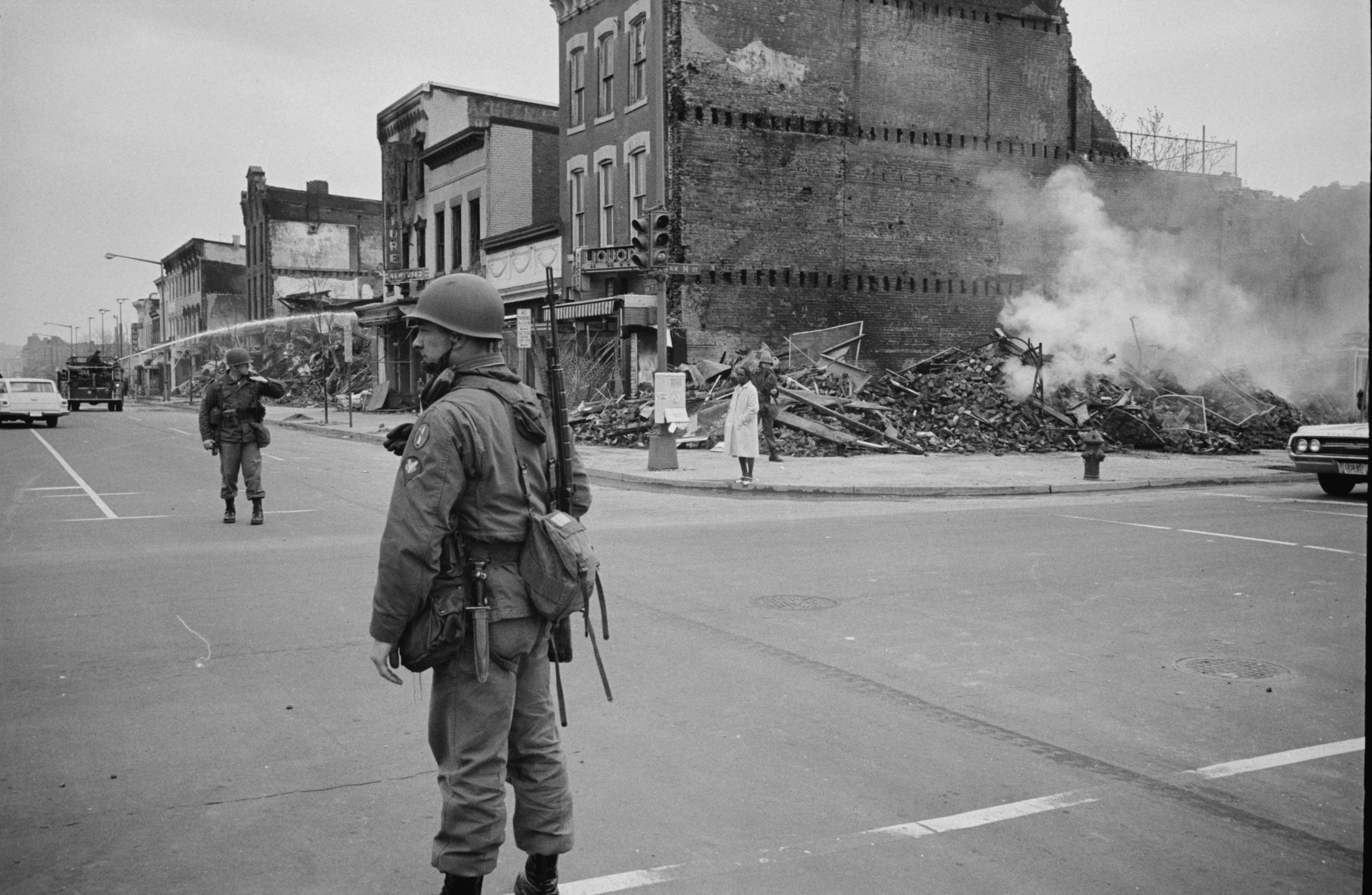
Aftermath from the riots, at corner of 7th & N Street NW – within two blocks of two separate fire-related deaths

=== Looting and arson ===
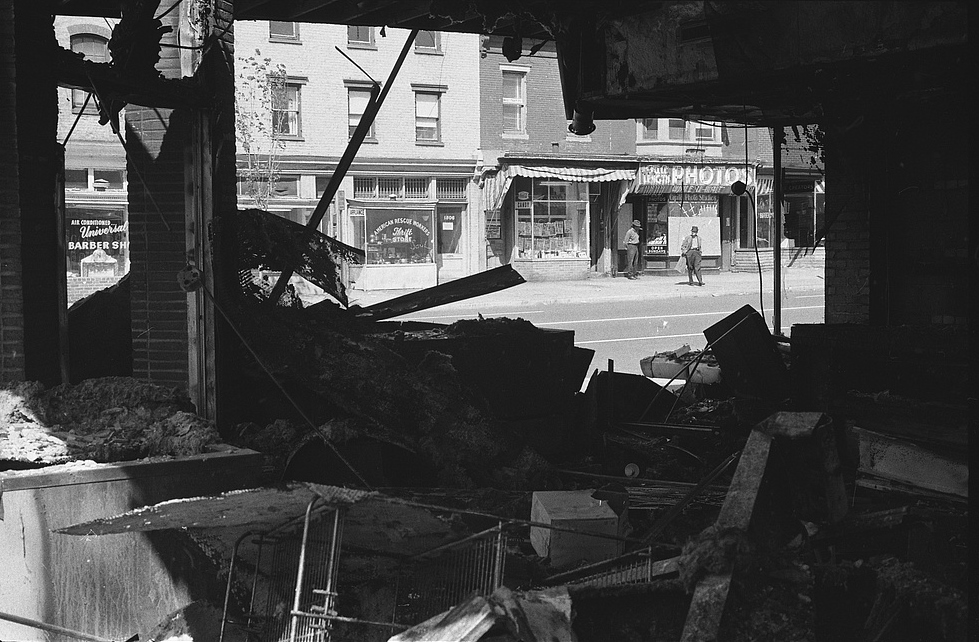
Ruins of a store destroyed during the riots

On the evening of Thursday, April 4, as word of King's assassination in Memphis, Tennessee spread, crowds began to gather at the intersection of 14th and U Streets. Stokely Carmichael, the militant civil and political rights activist who had parted with King in 1966 and had been removed as head of the Student Nonviolent Coordinating Committee in 1967, led members of the SNCC to stores in the neighborhood demanding that they close out of respect. Although polite at first, the crowd fell out of control and began breaking windows. Carmichael, who supported the riots, told rioters to "go home and get your guns."

The disturbances began when a window was broken at the People's Drug Store at the intersection of 14th and U Streets, NW. An hour and half later, by 11 pm, window-smashing and looting spread throughout the area. Looting occurred generally where there was little police protection. Store windows were broken, and people who had been watching began rushing inside to steal whatever they could, including televisions, clothes, food, alcohol, hats, and shoes. Amid the disorder, one man died after severely cutting his neck and chest on the shattered glass of a store window. The local police department could not handle the disturbance, as one officer said, "This situation is out of control, we need help it's too much for us to handle." The civil disturbance unit was later activated, but by the time order was restored around 3 am, 200 stores had their windows broken and 150 stores were looted, most of them emptied. Black store owners wrote "Soul Brother" on their storefronts so that rioters would spare their stores.

The looting and arson spread throughout DC by April 5 with 4 major areas containing much of the violence, the first being the downtown area where many department stores were looted which was bounded by H Street NW in the north, F Street NW in the south, 15th Street NW in the west, and 7th Street NW in the east. The 7th Street corridor in Shaw experienced the most significant destruction; nearly 80% of its businesses were affected, accounting for half of the total residential damage across Washington, D.C. The second area hit was along 7th Street NW from K to P Streets, which was where much of the fires took place and drained much police manpower. The third area hit was an over 2-mile long strip along 14th Street from downtown F Street NW to Park Rd, halfway to the border with Maryland. Another area of looting and arson was the area across the Anacostia River in Southeast DC, where 2 deaths took place.

The District of Columbia Fire and Emergency Medical Services Department reported 1,180 fires between March 30 and April 14, 1968, as arsonists set buildings ablaze.

=== Carmichael speeches ===
The next morning, Mayor-Commissioner Walter Washington ordered the damage cleaned up immediately. However, at 10 am, anger and discontent was still evident, and was exacerbated when Carmichael addressed a rally, saying "white America has declared war on black America", there is "no alternative to retribution" and "Black people have to survive, and the only way they will survive is by getting guns". "White America killed Dr. King last night. She made a whole lot easier for a whole lot of black people today. There no longer needs to be intellectual discussions, black people know that they have to get guns. White America will live to cry that she killed Dr. King last night. It would have been better if she had killed Rap Brown and/or Stokely Carmichael, but when she killed Dr. King, she lost." "I think white America made its biggest mistake when they killed Dr. King last night... He was the one man in our race who was trying to preach mercy and forgiveness for what the white man has done." He said "Execution of this retaliation will not be in the courts but in the streets,...We're going to die on our feet-we're tired of living on our stomachs."

During a Havana broadcast, he told blacks to stay away from their jobs to protest the slaying and "make the white racist Americans understand that Negroes have the necessary force to set right the outrages which have been made against Negroes in the United States."

=== Clashes with police and firefighters ===
Rioters walking down 7th Street NW and H Street NE came into violent confrontations with police. Around midday, arsonists set buildings ablaze while firefighters were attacked with bottles and rocks and unable to address the fires. By 1 pm, the riot was once again in full effect. False alarms about snipers spread quickly and repeatedly, creating confusion and fear. Even though officers had been told not to fire at people involved in the unrest, police still shot and killed two individuals, including a 15-year-old boy. In an attempt to manage the crowds, authorities began deploying tear gas, which mixed with the thick smoke already polluting the air, and police unsuccessful in their attempts.

=== Presidential radio address ===
In a radio address after the announcement of King's death, President Lyndon B. Johnson asked all citizens not to resort to violence. The following morning, he held a meeting at the White House with black civil rights leaders and government officials. He made a statement saying to "deny violence its victory," pleading that all citizens come together to keep King's dream alive. He declared the Sunday of that week to be Martin Luther King Jr. Day, a day of mourning, and ordered that all American flags be flown at half staff. He also made the final decision to bring in the military to stop the rioting.

=== Mayor-Commissioner Walter E. Washington attempts to quell the violence ===
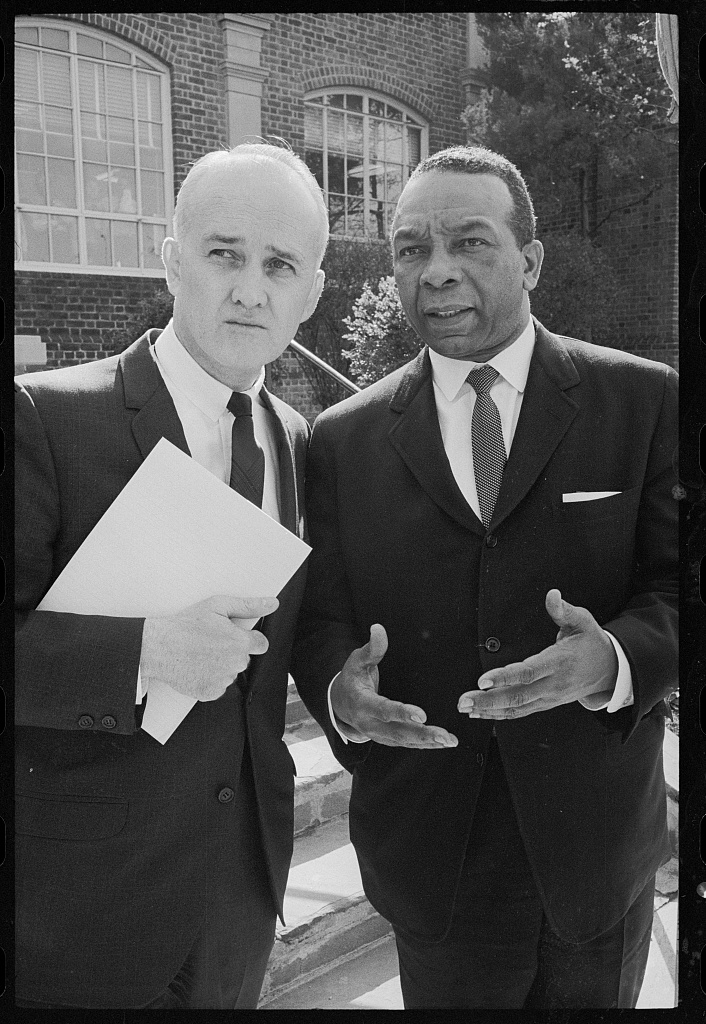
Mayor-Commissioner Walter Washington (right)

Walter Washington made nightly appearances during the riots, and these appearances were credited by many in the city with helping dampen the violence during the time. In addition, he refused FBI director J. Edgar Hoover's commands to shoot at rioters on the grounds that it would be needless slaughter and to avoid harm to nearby civilians. In 1974, Washington became the city's first elected mayor and its first black mayor, but only served one term after being overwhelmed with managing the city.

=== Coordination by Cyrus Vance ===
Cyrus Vance was the former Deputy Secretary of Defense and special Pentagon representative in D.C. 1968 Riots. Mayor Washington acted with Vance's guidance during Thursday night, the first hours of rioting. He also acted as the Pentagon's special representative from Friday night and on. He was called upon by Mayor Washington on Friday afternoon to coordinate the National Guard, the Army, and the police. He was the leading force in a shift in the military emphasis which focused on the overwhelming use of men, the use of tear gas, and an early, strictly enforced curfew.

=== Police response ===
Before the riots, John Layton, the police chief of Washington, emphasized that if there ever was a riot in Washington, he would use a large number of policemen with no guns, rather than fewer policemen with guns. During the riots, Layton put those words into action. Rather than acting immediately to the reports of rioting, looting, and window-breakings with a smaller force, he played the waiting game until a large enough force could be brought together. They then used tear gas instead of bullets to disrupt the rioting.

=== Military intervention ===
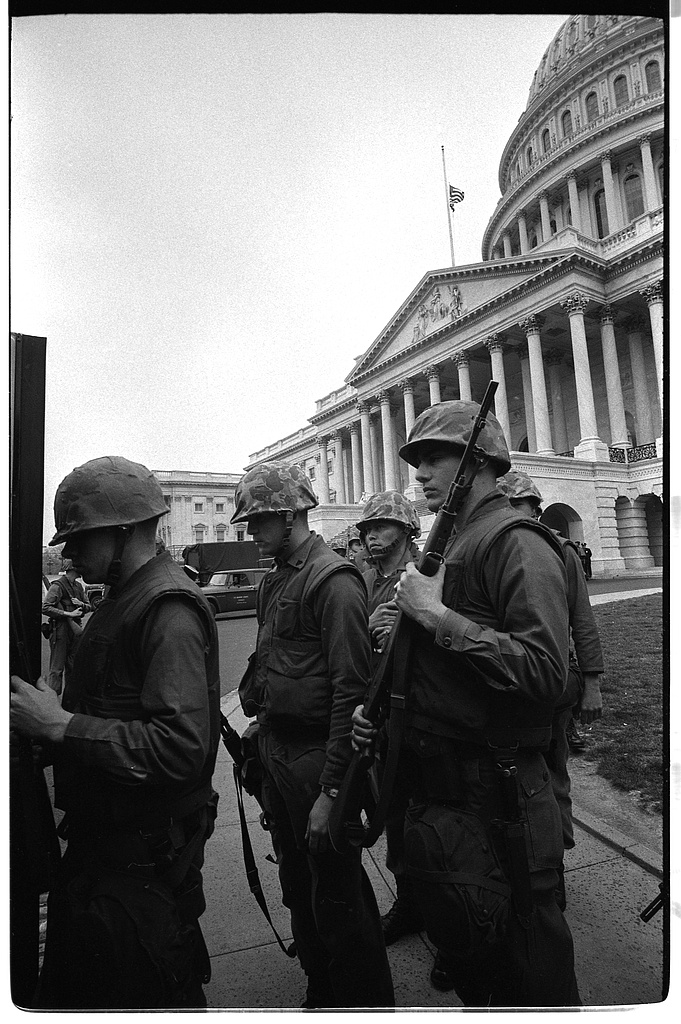
D.C. National Guard troops on patrol at the Capitol on April 8

On Friday, April 5, President Johnson invoked the Insurrection Act of 1807 and dispatched 11,850 federal troops along with 1,750 D.C. Army National Guardsmen to assist the overwhelmed D.C. police force. Marines mounted machine guns on the steps of the Capitol and Army soldiers from the 3rd Infantry Regiment guarded the White House. The 2nd Brigade of the 82nd Airborne Division from Fort Bragg, North Carolina and 6th Cavalry Regiment from Fort Meade, Maryland were among the principal federal forces sent to the city. At one point, on April 5, rioting reached within two blocks of the White House before rioters retreated. The occupation of Washington was the largest of any American city since the Civil War.

Federal troops and National Guardsmen imposed a strict curfew, worked riot control, patrolled the streets, guarded looted stores, and provided aid to those who were displaced by the rioting. They continued to remain after the rioting had officially ceased to protect against a second riot and further damage.

=== Deaths ===
By Sunday, April 7, when the city was considered pacified, 13 people had been killed in fires, by police officers, or by rioters. An additional 1,097 people were injured and over 7,600 people were arrested.

Name	Race	Gender	Age	Cause of death	Location of death	(Order died) Date of death
George Marvin Fletcher	White	Male	28 years old	Stabbed in confrontation with eight African-American youth	Gas station near 14th and U Street, NW	1. Thursday, April 4, 1968
Unidentified teenager	Black	Male	14~ years old	Killed in fire	G.C Murphy Store, 3128 14th Street, NW	2. Friday, April 5, 1968
George W. Neely	Black	Male	18 years old	Killed in fire	G.C Murphy Store, 3128 14th Street, NW	3. Friday, April 5 ~12:20 p.m, 1968
Unidentified teenager	Black	Male	14–17 years old	Killed in fire	Morton's store, 7th and H Streets	4. Friday, April 5 ~4 p.m, 1968
Vincent Lawson	Black	Male	15 years old	Killed in fire	Warehouse at 653 H St. NE, next to Morton's store	5. Friday, April 5, 1968; remains discovered in 1971
Harold Bentley	Black	Male	34 years old	Killed in fire	513 8th Street, NE, I–C Furniture Company	6. Friday, April 5, 1968
Thomas Stacey Williams	Black	Male	15 years old	Shot by policeman	Near 42nd Street, NE, 20019	7. Friday April 5 ~6 p.m, 1968
Ernest McIntyre	Black	Male	20 years old	Shot by policeman	409 South Carolina Ave. SE, by Al's Liquor Store	8. Friday, April 5, 1968
Annie James	Black	Female	52 years old	Smoke inhalation from fire	Apartment above Quality Clothing Store at 701 Q St. NW	9. Friday, April 5, 1968
Ronald James Ford	Black	Male	29 years old	Bled to death after slashing his neck and chest on a broken store window	Found outside the playground fence of Cardozo High School on 13th Street NW	10. Saturday, April 6, 1968
Cecil Hale 'Red Rooster'	Black	Male	40~ years old	Smoke inhalation from fire	Carolina Market, 1420 7th Street, NW	11. Sunday, April 7, 1968
William Paul Jeffers	Black	Male	40 years old	Killed in fire	Jan's Drygoods Store, 1514 7th Street, NW	12. Sunday, April 7, 1968
Fred Wulf	White	Male	78 years old	Found unconscious, allegedly beaten by black youths, developed pneumonia at hospital	Sidewalk at New Jersey and H streets	13. Monday, April 8, 1968

=== Civil Rights Act ===
On April 11, 1968, Johnson signed the Civil Rights Act of 1968, which included the Fair Housing Act section that prohibited discrimination concerning the sale, rental, and financing of housing based on race, religion, national origin, or gender. While a bill had been in question for some time, Johnson sped up the process following the assassination of Dr. King. The Act helped desegregate D.C. and reduced the amount of blacks living in ghettos, separated from wealthier whites-only areas.

=== Rebuilding after the riots ===
==== Fauntroy's proposal ====
Walter Fauntroy, City Council vice chairman and the leader of the Southern Christian Leadership Conference, played a key role in the rebuilding of D.C. after the 1968 riots. When the riots first broke out, Fauntroy expressed his connection with Dr. King, stating that "There is no one in the city whose heart is more crushed and broken than [his]" after King's assassination. He challenged people to "Handle your grief the way Dr. King would have wanted it," and those who acted otherwise "do dishonor to the life and mission of Dr. King."

Following the riots, Fauntroy proposed a program that would allow property owners the right to build bigger and more profitable buildings, as long as they spent money on community projects such as housing, apartment renovations, or retail centers. If someone wanted to go forward with a commercial project, they would need to first make a firm commitment to undertake a local project in a D.C. neighborhood. As part of their returning to the community, participants would be required to return 50% of the cash value of the bonuses they received through the program. Fauntroy estimated an increase of $500 million in revenue for the city government.

==== Property damage and white flight ====
The property loss caused by the riots was extensive and included damage to 1,199 buildings, including 283 residential and 1,590 commercial units. Losses to at least partially insured properties in the concentrated area of looting and destruction were estimated at $25 million. Insurance covered only 29% of the total loss suffered by these businesses. As a result of the riot damage, an estimated 2,900 insurance policies were cancelled and 500 businesses suffered inflated insurance rates. The Board of Trade estimated a loss of $40 million in tourist trade during April and May including those due to the cancellation of the National Cherry Blossom Festival.

The riots devastated Washington's inner city economy. With the destruction or closing of businesses, thousands of jobs were lost, and insurance rates soared. Made uneasy by the violence, white flight from the city accelerated, depressing property values. Crime in the burned out neighborhoods rose sharply, further discouraging investment.

On some blocks, only rubble remained for decades. Columbia Heights and the U Street Corridor did not begin to recover economically until the opening of metro (subway) stations at U Street in 1991 and Columbia Heights stations in 1999, which in turn assisted the areas' gentrification in the 2010s.

A 2024 study found that destruction during the riots "caused lots to remain vacant for the next thirty years and only recently converge in terms of structure value. The city acted to preclude for-profit land owners from leaving land vacant until demand conditions improved by purchasing nearly half of all properties in damaged neighborhoods. Despite this and other steps, the city had limited success in speeding up redevelopment."

== See also ==
- List of incidents of civil unrest in the United States
- Washington race riot of 1919
- 1991 Washington, D.C., riot
- 1968 New York City riot
- 1968 Detroit riot
- 1968 Louisville riots
- 1968 Pittsburgh riots
- 1968 Kansas City, Missouri riot
- Wilmington riot of 1968
- Protests of 1968
- Hard Revolution, novel by George Pelecanos
