= Late Edition =

Late Edition or Late Editions may mean:

- late edition of a newspaper, see Newspaper#Zoned and other editions
- Late-night news broadcasts in general
- Late Edition with Wolf Blitzer, broadcast on CNN from 1993 to 2009
- BBC4's The Late Edition (2005–08)
- "Late Editions" episode 9, season 5 of The Wire
- Late Night Edition, an Indian late-night television news show broadcast by CNN-News18
