= Hard Revolution =

2003 novel by George Pelecanos

- First edition cover
- Author: George Pelecanos
- Language: English
- Genre: Crime novel
- Set in: Washington, DC
- Published: 2003 by Little, Brown and Company
- Publication place: United States
- Media type: Print
- Pages: 376 pp
- ISBN: 978-0-3166-0897-8
- OCLC: 52341528
- Dewey Decimal: 813.54
- LC Class: PS3566.E354

Hard Revolution is a crime novel written by George Pelecanos and set in Washington, DC.

The main character of the book is Derek Strange, a black rookie police officer. The story is a prequel to other novels featuring Strange as a private detective. The book begins in 1959 when Strange is a child, setting the stage for the moral paths that the characters take as Pelecanos shows their evolution. The story then jumps to 1968 just after Strange joins the police force.

As in all of Pelecanos’ books, Washington, DC is a character throughout the book, featuring major local landmarks, personalities and music. Another major theme in the book is race and racial tension. Throughout the book, Strange fought through the pressure of work and of peer for acceptance of his community. The book climaxes with the assassination of Martin Luther King Jr. and the ensuing April 1968 Washington, D.C., riots, as Strange and veteran Detective Frank Vaughn search for the killer of Strange’s brother in the chaos.

== Critical reception ==
A review in BookReport.com stated "Pelecanos's Washington, D.C. is not that of the edifices and facades of government; rather, he walks the streets that aren't mentioned in any guidebooks."

Booklist Oneline wrote: "As Strange, a proud black man and a good cop, is forced to work riot control in his own neighborhood, all of the unresolvable conflicts--personal, racial, historical, political--that have roiled in the background of this novel are ignited in front of our eyes."

Library Journal wrote: "Pelecanos sets both cases against the backdrop of racial unrest in Washington, D.C., brilliantly using his characters and their situations to examine the era's social realities. As with the previous Strange works, this is a superior crime novel from one of the genre's outstanding writers."
