= Soul Circus (novel) =

2003 crime novel by George Pelecanos

- First edition cover
- Author: George Pelecanos
- Language: English
- Series: Strange and Quinn
- Genre: Crime
- Publisher: Little Brown
- Publication date: March 2003 (First edition)
- Publication place: USA
- Media type: Print
- Pages: 336
- ISBN: 0-316-60843-2 (Hardcover first edition)
- OCLC: 49332886
- Dewey Decimal: 813/.54 21
- LC Class: PS3566.E354 S68 2003
- Preceded by: Hell to Pay
- Followed by: Hard Revolution

Soul Circus is a 2003 crime novel by George Pelecanos. It is set in Washington DC and focuses on private investigators Derek Strange and Terry Quinn. The title refers to dialogue from within the novel where two young drug dealers discuss their lives. It is the third novel to involve Strange and Quinn, following Right as Rain (2001) and Hell to Pay (2002).

The book won the 2003 Los Angeles Times Book Prize for Mystery/Thriller.

== Plot introduction ==
The novel follows private investigators Derek Strange and Terry Quinn as they work on several cases in Washington DC. Strange's main case is to provide evidence for the defense lawyers of drug lord Granville Oliver. Two secondary cases involve the disappearance of women.

== Plot summary ==
Strange is working on the defence of Granville Oliver. Oliver has been charged with the murder of his uncle and faces the death penalty. Strange is trying to locate Devra Stokes who can discredit the testimony of the prosecution's witness Phillip Wood. He learns that Stokes is working in a beauty salon paid for by Wood's successor Horace McKinley. She refuses to testify. Quinn is working on a separate case for his girlfriend. He believes a group of young men have the information he needs but is unable to get them to talk to him.

Dewayne Durham and Horace McKinley are considering eliminating one another's organizations to cut down on competition. McKinley's enforcers James and Jeremy Coates perform a drive-by shooting on Jerome Long and Alante Jones as they deal drugs for Durham. Durham is forced to respond and instructs Long to kill the Coates brothers. McKinley learns that Stokes talked to Strange and tries to intimidate her by sexually assaulting her. Stokes is enraged by his actions and decides to testify.

Strange and Quinn are employed to locate Olivia Elliot by Mario Durham. They find her quickly and pass the information to Durham. Durham rents a gun from Ulysses Foreman and approaches Elliot. They argue and he murders her and conceals her body in the woods. He returns the gun to Foreman and admits to firing it but claims he did not shoot anyone. Foreman rents the gun to Mario's brother Dewayne for Jerome Long. Mario goes into hiding with his friend Donut.

Long manages to kill Jeremy Coates but is shot by James immediately afterwards. Jones drives his car at James Coates and kills him but is shot as he does so. The police tie the shooting to the murder of Olivia Elliot by matching the gun. Durham learns of the link between the incidents when the police question him; he puts Mario into hiding and begins to suspect that Foreman is working against him.

Strange and Quinn are questioned by the police and give them Durham's identity. They try to track Mario themselves as they feel partly responsible for Elliot's murder but the police beat them to Donut. Donut refuses to give up Mario's whereabouts to either the investigators or the police. Mario begins to follow in Donut's footsteps and sells fake narcotics on the street. One of his customers returns and murders him.

Strange finds that his home has been burgled and his files relating to the Oliver case stolen. He has an answerphone message threatening him with obstruction of justice as one of the witnesses he interviewed gave him information that he should have passed to the police. Strange was unaware of the requirement and seeks advice from Oliver's legal team.

Strange meets with Devra and agrees to relocate her for safety. He begins to follow McKinley and tracks him to Foreman's home where he sells weapons. Strange has Quinn meet him there and Quinn tails McKinley back to his home but is noticed. Strange tracks an employee of Foreman's to a gun store and observes him buying a weapon under false pretences. He passes the information to a contact in the police. He asks Quinn to watch over Devra. Quinn leaves Devra unwatched to return to question the men about his missing girl but is again unsuccessful. He is increasingly agitated about being intimidated by the men.

Strange and Quinn meet at the beauty salon and find that McKinley has abducted Stokes. They ambush him at his home and rescue her. McKinley has had his enforcer Mike Montgomery take her son to a separate location. Quinn takes Stokes home and finds that Montgomery has had a change of heart and returned the boy. Strange cuts McKinley and McKinley threatens him in a way similar to the answerphone message. Strange leaves McKinley injured but alive. McKinley calls Foreman for help when he is unable to get hold of Montgomery and tries to recruit him into attacking Durham. When they confront Durham Foreman shoots McKinley and rants about not taking orders from drug dealers.

Despite their success with Stokes Quinn is unable to let go of his failure with the other case. He again visits the group of men, this time taking his gun, he intimidates them into giving him the information he needs which he writes down. As he drives away the men ambush and murder him at a stop sign.

Months later Oliver is convicted and faces the death penalty despite Stokes's testimony. Dewayne Durham and Ulysses Foreman have been arrested and are facing trial. Quinn's missing girl is found using the information he wrote down. Angry at his partner's violent death Strange returns to the gun store at night and burns it down.

== Major themes ==
Reviews note the theme of violence. The novel examines some of the social causes for the violence depicted. The Guardian pointed out the irony that the state is working to execute Granville Oliver against Washingtonians' consensus when so many other African American men die on the street. and called this an original argument against the death penalty. The New York Times compared the depiction of violence growing from smaller actions to the work of Richard Price. Pelecanos has described the book as an anti-detective novel because no case is solved by the private investigators and they are constantly a step behind the police.

== Reception ==
Reviews have praised the novel's realism, believable characters and dialogue, sense of place and the complexity of the novel. The Guardian picked out Pelecanos' ability to provide authentic voices for his characters but criticised instances where the narrative voice was inconsistent with the reality of the character. Other reviewers have commented that the gory detail and social realism may be offputting for some readers. The New York Times commented that the blaming of some of the characters' behaviour on the absence of father figures may be an oversimplification.

== Allusions and references ==
Strange and Quinn continue their partnership from the 2001 novel Right as Rain. The novel follows directly on from Hell to Pay in terms of Strange gathering evidence for the defence of Granville Oliver. Minor characters from earlier novels in the series that appear include Lieutenant Lydell Blue, Oliver's associate Phillip Wood, Strange's protégé Lamar Williams, Quinn's girlfriend Sue and Strange's young football player Robert Gray.

Continuing plot lines include Quinn's relationship with Sue, Strange's relationship with Janine and Lorenzo, Strange's involvement with orphaned Robert Gray and his coaching of a children's football team. Strange is seen to have become more comfortable with himself since his marriage.

Strange's reasons for defending Oliver stem from a past incident where Strange was responsible for the death of Oliver's father. The character justifies his defence of the criminal by stating that he is not defending Oliver but his rights.

Nick Stefanos, main character of Pelecanos' first three books, appears in the novel. He assists Strange in the arson of the gun store and helps him with his case. Stefanos now works for Elaine Clay, the wife of Marcus Clay from Pelecanos DC Quartet series. Strange and Stefanos meet at his friend Billy Georgelakos' place - Strange has visited there in each of the books he appears in.

A reviewer commented that the interweaving of characters from Pelecanos' other novels gives a sense of place and a story larger than the novels themselves. Pelecanos has commented that he deliberately interweaves characters from his novels to create a sense of a fictional universe that parallels the real world.

== Awards and nominations ==
Soul Circus was awarded the 2003 Los Angeles Times Book Prize for Mystery/Thriller.
