= Shame the Devil =

1999 crime novel written by George Pelecanos

- First edition
- Author: George Pelecanos
- Language: English
- Series: D.C. Quartet
- Genre: Crime novel
- Publisher: Dennis McMillan
- Publication date: 1999
- Publication place: United States
- Media type: Print (Hardback & Paperback)
- Pages: 299 pp
- ISBN: 0-316-69523-8 (Hardcover first edition)
- OCLC: 41285041
- Dewey Decimal: 813/.54 21
- LC Class: PS3566.E354 S53 2000
- Preceded by: The Sweet Forever

Shame the Devil is a 1999 crime novel written by George Pelecanos. It is set in Washington DC and focuses on a botched robbery and its consequences. It is the last of four books comprising the D.C. Quartet. The other books in this series are The Big Blowdown, King Suckerman, and The Sweet Forever.

The book was a finalist for the Los Angeles Times Book Prize for Mystery/Thriller.

== Plot introduction ==
Two ruthless killers head into a pizza place to rob the joint while one of the men's brother waits in the car. The robbery goes wrong and the men kill the restaurant's employees. The robber in the getaway car is killed by a cop and the robbers hit a little boy in their escape.

The novel jumps forward two and a half years and introduces the character of Dimitri Karras, the father of the young boy. He attends grief counseling sessions with the family members of those who were killed that day. Karras begins to get used to living again when his friend, Nick Stefanos sets him up with a job as a bartender at "The Spot". Meanwhile, the robbers are plotting revenge. It all leads up to a showdown of good versus evil.
