= Nick's Trip =

1993 novel by George Pelecanos

- First edition
- Author: George Pelecanos
- Language: English
- Series: Nick Stefanos series
- Genre: Crime novel
- Publisher: St Martins Press
- Publication date: March 1993
- Publication place: United States
- Media type: Print (Hardback & Paperback)
- Pages: 276 pp
- ISBN: 0-312-08862-0 (Hardcover first edition)
- OCLC: 27068911
- Dewey Decimal: 813/.54 20
- LC Class: PS3566.E354 N5 1993
- Preceded by: A Firing Offense
- Followed by: Down by the River Where the Dead Men Go

Nick's Trip is a 1993 crime novel from author George Pelecanos. It is set in Washington D.C. and focuses on bartender Nick Stefanos as he investigates the disappearance of an old friend's wife and the murder of another friend. It is the second of several Pelecanos novels to feature the character and the second book of a trilogy with Stefanos as the main character. The preceding book in this series is A Firing Offense and the series concludes with Down by the River Where the Dead Men Go.

== Plot ==
Nick Stefanos is a bartender at a neighborhood place called "The Spot". His high-school friend Billy Goodrich asks him to search for his missing wife.
