= Namond Brice =

Character from The Wire

- The Wire character
- Julito McCullum as Namond Brice
- First appearance: "Boys of Summer" (2006)
- Last appearance: "Late Editions" (2008)
- Created by: David Simon
- Portrayed by: Julito McCullum

In-universe information
- Alias: "Nay"
- Gender: Male
- Occupation: Drug dealer
- Family: Wee-Bey Brice (father); De'Londa Brice (mother); Howard "Bunny" Colvin (legal guardian); Lolita Colvin (legal guardian)

Namond Brice (/ˈneɪmənd/ NAY-mənd) is a fictional character on the HBO drama The Wire, played by Julito McCullum. In the series, Namond is a middle school student who first appears during the 4th season. He is friends with Michael Lee and Randy Wagstaff. He often bullies Duquan “Dukie” Weems. He is the son of Wee-Bey Brice and De'Londa Brice, and lives with his mother. Thanks to his father's connection with the Barksdale drug dealing organization, they receive excellent financial support.

Wee-Bey is serving consecutive life sentences for multiple homicides committed on behalf of the Barksdales, including having confessed to crimes he did not commit. Grateful to Wee-Bey for shielding the rest of the organization, the Barksdales provide for Namond and De’Londa. The incarceration of Avon Barksdale shatters the organization, however, his sister Brianna Barksdale continues to pay them. This steady income means that Namond is much better off than his peers.

== Character storyline ==
=== Season 4 ===
Namond regularly accompanies Michael to a community gym run by Dennis “Cutty” Wise but seldom boxes himself. He works for former Barksdale lieutenant, Bodie Broadus, as a drug runner. Bodie gave Namond the job out of respect for Wee-Bey, who he worked with before his imprisonment, and deliberately reminds Namond of this.

Not interested in his line of work, Namond often reads while working and is seen leaving early to catch pigeons with his friends. He becomes impatient with Randy while trying to trap a potential homing pigeon, but quiets when Michael tells him his voice may scare away the birds. It enrages Namond when Dukie scares the birds off by smashing a bottle nearby, so he taunts Dukie until he attacks him, and Michael breaks up the fight.

When Dukie gets beaten up by a rival gang, Namond says he wants revenge, and Randy suggests an ambush using water balloons filled with urine. The plan backfires on Namond, who bursts his balloon on himself. The terrace boys then chase after Namond and his friends, catching Michael. While the rival gang beat up Michael, Namond is hiding nearby and watches. Namond later buys ice cream for his friends, including Dukie, at Michael's urging.

Namond and De’Londa often visit Wee-Bey in prison, who relies on them to take care of his beloved pet fish. Namond follows his father's instructions. Wee-Bey, glad that Namond is working with Bodie, gives him advice on succeeding as a drug dealer, including getting a less distinctive haircut. De’Londa is less than impressed with Namond's poor attitude towards his work and threatens to withhold money for new school clothes until he applies himself. For Michael to earn money for a while, Namond swaps his job with Michael, irritating Bodie, who points out his corner is not “social services”. Despite her threats and Namond's job swap, De’Londa buys the new clothes.

When school begins, Namond proves to be disruptive in class and shows a general disregard for school rules. Assistant Principal Marcia Donnelly soon reprimands him for wearing non-uniform clothing. Namond, Michael, Dukie, and his friend Kareem Williams are in Roland "Prez" Pryzbylewski's math class, along with Chiquan, Laetitia, and Zenobia. His frequent disruptions ultimately get him suspended for three days, and of his own volition, he then apologizes to Prez. The knife Namond kept hidden in a bush at school gets confiscated by Donnelly in a random sweep.

De'Londa takes Namond to visit his father during his suspension. Wee-Bey continues to take more interest in the street than in Namond's school. While he admires Namond's attitude, Wee-Bey cautions his son on the increasingly savage and two-faced nature of the drug trade as symbolized by Marlo Stanfield's organization.

Namond and De'Londa suffer a major change in circumstance when Brianna cuts them off. De'Londa is outraged but powerless to argue. Brianna tells Namond that she wanted them both to be there so that De’Londa could not lie to him about what happened.

De'Londa sets Namond up to deal narcotics to support them. She still refuses to let him drop out of school. She insists she will convince Bodie to give him a package. Namond asks about what Brianna meant about them already having enough money and De'Londa tells him that Brianna was lying. She visits Bodie and convinces him to give Namond a package to work, threatening to tell Wee-Bey with the suggestion that he might arrange something unpleasant for Bodie if he refuses.

When Namond returns to school, he is placed in a special class under Howard "Bunny" Colvin. He acts out to get out early to sell his package but learns that in his new class, there will be no further suspensions. He also cannot faze Colvin as Colvin is a former Western district police commander who has grown up in West Baltimore. Because of this, Colvin is not as scared as the academic types in the classroom, as he has dealt with many people much worse than Namond during his 30-year tenure with the Baltimore Police Department.

Namond recruits Donut, Little Kenard, and Byron to help him move a package, but despite his best efforts, he cannot convince Michael to get involved. A rival crew forces Namond away from his preferred choice of territory. Another young dealer called Sherrod attacks him as he leaves Cutty's gym to warn him off. Cutty breaks up the fight, rescuing Namond from a beating. It does not impress his young dealers when his second choice of territory slows down trading.

Namond enjoys the Special Class when the teacher gives him a chance to talk about his ambitions and his views on what makes a successful “corner boy”. Namond says he believes he will be dead in ten years but still claims to have the ambition of becoming a drug kingpin. He reveals a likely motive for his disruptive behavior when he says he should not have to obey the rules when there are so many examples of others profiting from wrongdoing, giving steroids, liquor, cigarettes, and Enron as examples.

Namond's shrewd descriptions of life on the corner in the classroom do not translate into success in his business. He doesn't move the package as fast as his mother is expecting and upsets her by transferring the narcotics into vials in their home. She tells him to recruit a lieutenant to handle that aspect of the business and visits Bodie once more to demand better territory for Namond. Namond makes Kenard his lieutenant and entrusts him with the package.

Namond does not appear to have inherited his father's stomach for the violence inherent in drug dealing. He talks and acts tough around his friends to enhance his corner boy image, but they see through his charade. This reaches a pivotal point when Kenard steals the package. Namond berates Dukie, causing Michael, who is fast-growing into a ruthless hitter under Chris's guidance, to slap Namond three times and push him into a wall.

Namond breaks down in tears, saying his friend “ain’t Mike” anymore. Sergeant Ellis Carver calls De’Londa to explain events, but assuming the call is about a charge, she tells him to throw Namond into “baby booking” to teach him a lesson, hanging up before Carver can explain Namond's innocence. De’Londa throws Namond out, bringing him to Howard Colvin's attention.

Colvin then talks Wee-Bey into allowing him to adopt Namond, so he can have a better life than on the streets. Wee-Bey agrees and tells De’Londa to get out of the way, even though she still wants him to become a drug dealer. She eventually agrees after realizing there is no other choice because she will lose everything if Wee-Bey cuts her off. Colvin and his wife Lolita become Namond's legal guardians.

Namond's fate has parallels with D’Angelo Barksdale, in that both have domineering mothers who force their sons into illegal drug dealing. Namond, however, avoids D’Angelo's end by being adopted by Colvin.

=== Season 5 ===
In the series, a year later, Namond is excelling academically, participating in a city-wide school debate, as the Colvins look on with pride. He has escaped the dangerous streets of West Baltimore, unlike Michael, Duquan, and Randy.

== Critical response ==
Entertainment Weekly named Namond one of the five most interesting characters in season four.
