= Pilot (The Deuce) =

- The Deuce episode
- Episode no.: Season 1 Episode 1
- Directed by: Michelle MacLaren
- Written by: George Pelecanos; David Simon
- Cinematography by: Pepe Avila del Pino
- Editing by: Alex Hall
- Original air dates: August 25, 2017 (online); September 10, 2017 (HBO)
- Running time: 84 minutes

Episode chronology
← Previous —	Next → "Show and Prove"

"Pilot" is the first episode of the American television drama series The Deuce. It premiered on September 10, 2017, on premium cable network HBO; the pilot was released in advance on HBO streaming service HBO Go on August 25. The episode was written by creators and showrunners George Pelecanos and David Simon, and was directed by Michelle MacLaren.

== Plot ==
In 1971, Brooklyn bartender Vincent "Vinnie" Martino (James Franco) is beaten by muggers while he is performing a cash drop for his employer's bar. Vinnie's identical twin brother, reckless gambler Frankie (Franco), owes money to several mobsters and bookies. Fed up with his unfaithful wife, Andrea (Zoe Kazan), Vinnie leaves his family and decides to focus on his bar.

Pimp C.C. (Gary Carr) recruits Lori (Emily Meade), a new arrival from Minnesota, as a prostitute. C.C's prized possession is Ashley (Jamie Neumann), who is in love with C.C. and becomes jealous of Lori. Eileen "Candy" Merrell (Maggie Gyllenhaal), a prostitute and single mother, chooses to work without a pimp. She explains the realities of the sex trade to a nervous teen trying to lose his virginity, and later visits her son in the suburban home where he lives with Candy's mother. Another pimp, Larry Brown (Gbenga Akinnagbe), manages sweet-natured sex worker Darlene (Dominique Fishback), who is injured by a regular client during a rape role play and later stays out until sunrise watching a movie with an elderly client.

College student Abigail "Abby" Parker (Margarita Levieva) is arrested for buying drugs. At the station, she meets officer Chris Alston (Lawrence Gilliard Jr.), who is versed on the players in the streets. The arresting officer, Flanagan (Don Harvey), lets her go without charge and takes her to Vinnie's bar, but Abby becomes attracted to Vinnie. She arrives for her exam the following morning, but leaves the building. At his hotel, Vinnie witnesses C.C. wounding Ashley with a knife after she refuses to work in the rain.

== Production ==
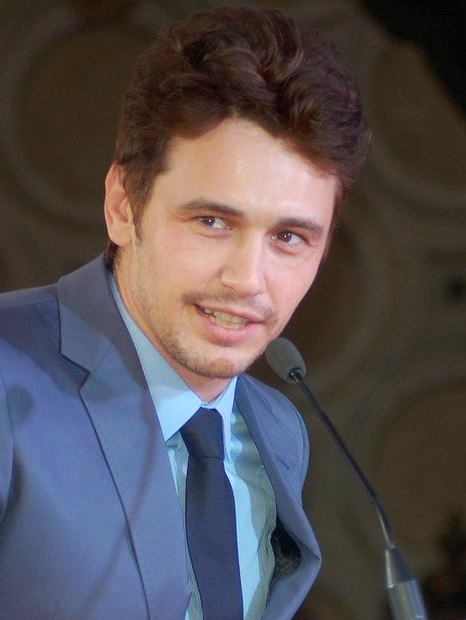
James Franco was the first actor to sign on to the project

In August 2015, it was reported that HBO had picked up two David Simon pilots, one of which being The Deuce, which would star James Franco and be directed by Breaking Bad regular Michelle MacLaren. In September, Maggie Gyllenhaal was cast as a Times Square hooker in the pilot, which was set to begin filming in the fall of that year. In preparation for the project, she consulted with former prostitute and porn star Annie Sprinkle. “She had some very simple helpful insights... How many people do you fuck a night, what do you do if it’s really cold.” Gyllenhaal also went to the set of a porn shoot in Los Angeles, having been invited by a former adult film star who was working craft services for the shot. Of the project, Simon said "We’re interested in what it means when profit is the primary metric for what we call society. In that sense, this story is intended as neither prurient nor puritan. It’s about a product, and those human beings who created, sold, profited from and suffered with that product... Porn, prostitution, pimps, the Mob, after-hours nightlife, institutional corruption, and New York in its Wild West heyday ... it’s a world rich in character, and a fascinating story we’re eager to tell."

Filming began in October 2015, and in January, 2016, the pilot was picked up for series.

== Reception ==
The pilot episode was watched by 830,000 viewers and received an 0.24 18-49 rating.
