= The Night Gardener =

2006 crime novel by George Pelecanos

- First edition cover
- Author: George Pelecanos
- Language: English
- Genre: Crime novel
- Publisher: Little Brown
- Publication date: 8 August 2006
- Publication place: United States
- Media type: Print (hardback & paperback)
- Pages: 384 pp
- ISBN: 0-316-15650-7 (Hardcover first edition)
- OCLC: 63108402
- Dewey Decimal: 813/.54 22
- LC Class: PS3566.E354 N53 2006

The Night Gardener is a 2006 crime novel by George Pelecanos. It is set in Washington, DC and focuses on homicide detective Gus Ramone, and ex-cops Dan "Doc" Holiday and TC Cook as they investigate the possible return of a serial killer.

The book was a finalist for the Los Angeles Times Book Prize for Mystery/Thriller.

== Plot ==
The novel opens in 1985 at the scene of the discovery of a third victim of the "Night Gardener" so called by the homicide investigators, and establishes Cook as the lead investigator with Ramone and Holiday as rookies. All three victims of the killer were found in community gardens, shot in the head after being similarly assaulted.

Twenty years later Holiday has left the force and Ramone has become a homicide detective. Ramone is working with his squad on the murder of Jacqueline Taylor. They manage to arrest and extract a confession from her boyfriend Tyree Williams which is backed by physical evidence. At home Ramone enjoys a happy family life and tries to mentor his son through the prejudices of his new school.

Holiday now works as a chauffeur, drinks in a bar and is unmotivated. One night after cruising, drinking and getting lost, Holiday falls asleep in his car near a community garden. He witnesses some events before sleeping again and awakes to find the body of Asa Johnson with a gunshot wound to the temple. Holiday makes an anonymous call to the police.

Bill "Garloo" Wilkins is the primary investigator on the Johnson case. Ramone becomes involved because of the boy's friendship with his son. He begins to notice similarities to the palindrome murders but says nothing. The Johnson family pressures Ramone to find a suspect. Evidence and the autopsy show a link with the palindrome murders. Wilkins uncovers evidence that Johnson was homosexual on his home computer. Ramone recognises Holiday's voice on the tape of the anonymous call and tracks him down.

Holiday also realises the similarity to the palindrome murders and contacts Cook. Now retired and afflicted by a small stroke, Cook continues to trail the early suspect Reginald Wilson. Wilson went to prison shortly after the last murder in the 80s and Cook still believes Wilson is the "Night Gardener". He is invigorated by the possibility of another chance to prove his theory and eagerly joins Holiday in an unofficial investigation.

Ramone arranges to meet with Cook and Holiday. Holiday is truthful about everything he saw on the night of Johnson's death and Cook tells Ramone about his suspicions over Wilson but it turns out that Wilson has an alibi for the night in question.

The night after the Johnson killing Ramone's partner, Rhonda Willis becomes the primary investigator on a new case, the murder of Jamal White. They find that the same gun was used in the deaths of White and Johnson. Through a tangled chain of connections detectives trace and arrest Aldan "Beano" Tinsley who, under pressure, confesses to finding the gun when walking through the gardens - after Asa Johnson shot himself.

Remembering the number of the patrol car from his night near the gardens, Holiday manages to identify the officer driving as Grady Dunne without Ramone's help. Ramone meets Holiday and tells him that Johnson's death was not related to the palindrome murders. Ramone convinces Holiday to identify Tinsley as the man he saw in the gardens on the night of Johnson's death in order to strengthen the White case because he abused Tinsley's rights in order to get the information he needed. Holiday is surprised to find that Ramone is not as straight as he believed.

Ramone returns to the gardens and finds Asa Johnson's journal hidden near where his body was found. He reads the diary in full and finds that Johnson had a relationship with a man who used the pseudonym "RoboMan". Ramone believes this was Johnson's math teacher Robert Bolton. Ramone resolves to trace the origins of the gun Johnson used, finding it belonged to Terrance Johnson which he remains quiet about. Instead he passes the information about the teacher on to the Morals Unit.

Holiday keeps the information about Johnson's suicide from Cook as he is worried it will demoralise him. Holiday and Cook follow Dunne to the gas station where Wilson works and are excited at the potential connection. They split up and Holiday confronts Dunne and realises that while he is corrupt he was not involved in Johnson's death. Holiday resolves to tell Cook the truth. Cook follows Wilson and then goes to his home with plans to break in. Cook approaches the house but becomes suddenly unwell and passes away in his car outside.

Holiday tells Ramone that Cook is missing and eventually finds his body. Holiday moves it to another location to avoid the press saying that Cook was still obsessed with the palindrome case. Blaming himself for Cook's death, he resolves to break into Wilson's home himself. In an unrelated drug shootout, Dunne is on the take, and in the melee, Brock, Benjamin and Dunne are killed and Henderson flees.

The novel closes with a return to 1985 and the revelation that Wilson was responsible for the palindrome murders, hiding trophies from each victim in his record collection.
