= The Big Blowdown =

1996 novel by George Pelecanos

- First edition
- Author: George Pelecanos
- Language: English
- Series: D.C. Quartet
- Genre: Crime novel
- Publisher: St. Martin's Press
- Publication date: June 1996
- Publication place: United States
- Media type: Print (hardback & paperback)
- Pages: 313 pp
- ISBN: 0-312-14284-6 (Hardcover first edition)
- OCLC: 33971095
- Dewey Decimal: 813/.54 20
- LC Class: PS3566.E354 B54 1996

The Big Blowdown is a 1996 crime novel written by George Pelecanos. It is set in Washington, D.C., and focuses on Peter Karras. It is the first of four books comprising the D.C. Quartet. The other books in this series are King Suckerman, The Sweet Forever and Shame the Devil.

== Plot ==
The book opens with a gravely injured Peter Karras in a D.C. hospital in 1946. The plot flashes back to Karras and his friends as children in 1933. Karras gets into a fight with a group of African-American boys and his opponent, Junior Oliver, earns his grudging respect. Next the story jumps to 1944 and the Philippines theatre of World War II. Karras kills his first man and one of his childhood friends, Billy Nicodemus, is killed. Next the book returns to 1946 and we learn Karras has married Eleni, and how he came to be injured. Karras flippant attitude upsets his superior Mr. Burke and when Karras fails to collect a debt from another Greek Burke decides to have him punished. He instructs Recevo to betray his friend Karras. Burke dispatches his enforcer Reed to assault Karras after Recevo sets him up. Reed beats Karras with a baseball bat.

When promiscuous Lola disappears in 1948 after moving to Washington her brother Mike Florek decides to search for her. Eventually Florek takes a job at Nick Stefanos' diner in 1949. Karras is now working there as a chef. Jimmy Boyle, now a beat cop, has become peripherally involved in the investigation of the murder of several prostitutes by a serial killer. Karras correctly suspects that Lola has become a prostitute and aids Florek in his search. Lola's madam Lydia is murdered by the killer and Lola witnesses the crime. Boyle locates Lola for Karras and Karras and Florek extract her from Morgan's brothel. Karras lets Florek and Lola leave town.

Burke targets Stefanos' diner for his protection racket. When Stefanos resists Burke hires Bender's outfit to pressure Stefanos and fool him into believing he needs the protection. Karras sees through the scheme and they lure Bender's men into a trap and kill them. After rescuing Lola Karras suspects Gearhart as the murderer from her description. He enlists the help of Joe Recevo who informs Burke of Gearhart's murderous tendencies. Burke confronts Gearhart and begins to organize a cover-up. Recevo informs Jimmy Boyle of Gearhart's involvement and tells him to go to his apartment to retrieve the murder weapon. Burke dispatches Reed on the same mission. When Boyle reaches the apartment he is grievously wounded by Gearhart, who had disobeyed Burke's instructions and returned home. Boyle manages to shoot Gearhart in the struggle.

Burke realizes that Karras is the common-link between Boyle and Gearhart and confronts Recevo. He instructs Recevo to bring Karras to him. Recevo brings Karras in but the two make a last stand together and kill Burke, Reed and many of their men before being shot. The book ends with a coda set in 1959 as Stefanos and Costa visiting Karras' grave.

== Reception ==
The Richmond Review compared the novel to the works of James Ellroy and Eddie Bunker. In particular Karras search for redemption through his involvement in solving the prostitute murders sub-plot was described as evoking Ellroy. Reviews praised Pelecanos' dialogue and sense of place. They also remarked upon Pelecanos' use of film and music references and the cinematic nature of the book. Karras has been described as a flawed hero because of his infidelity and lack of commitment to his family. The novel's moral complexity has been praised. The use of violent set pieces has been praised as enlivening the novel.

== Awards ==
In 1997, The Big Blowdown was the recipient of the International Crime Novel of the Year award in France, Germany and Japan.
