= Hell to Pay (novel) =

2002 crime novel by George Pelecanos

- First edition cover
- Author: George Pelecanos
- Language: English
- Series: Strange and Quinn
- Genre: Crime novel
- Publisher: Little Brown
- Publication date: March 2002
- Publication place: United States
- Media type: Print (hardback & paperback)
- Pages: 288 pp
- ISBN: 0-316-69506-8 (Hardcover first edition)
- OCLC: 47120402
- Dewey Decimal: 813/.54 21
- LC Class: PS3566.E354 H45 2002
- Preceded by: Right as Rain
- Followed by: Soul Circus

Hell to Pay is a 2002 crime novel by George Pelecanos. It is set in Washington DC and focuses on private investigator Derek Strange and his partner Terry Quinn. It is the second novel to involve the characters and is preceded by Right as Rain (2001) and followed by Soul Circus (2003), and Hard Revolution (2004).

In 2003, Hell to Pay was a finalist for the Anthony Award for Best Mystery, Barry Award for Best Novel, Shamus Award for Best Novel, and Dilys Award.

== Plot ==
The novel's central plotline concerns the murder by drug dealers of a no-account deadbeat over an unpaid debt and the incidental killing of the intended victim's nephew, starting with the killers’ efforts to locate the victim and continuing through Strange's investigation of the murders and the killings’ repercussions in the world of the DC drug trade. Secondary plotlines involve efforts by Strange's white associate, Terry Quinn, to locate a young girl who has disappeared into prostitution, as well as Strange's background investigation of a potentially shady young man who is engaged to marry the beautiful daughter of Strange's wealthy friend.

== Reception ==
Hell to Pay received starred reviews from Booklist and Publishers Weekly, who noted the novel's action starts early "and continues to throb all the way through". They also called the novel's protagonist "a rich, sometimes frustrating but always warmly human character".

Kirkus Reviews wrote that "despite all the scenes illustrating the hopelessness of growing up in the nation’s capital, the author’s ardent muckraking makes his tenth novel his most hopeful, even though it takes the edge off his trademark grasp of urban evil".
