= The Man Who Came Uptown =

Twenty-first novel by author George Pelecanos

- First edition (US)
- Author: George Pelecanos
- Language: English
- Published: 2018
- Publisher: Mulholland Books (US); Orion Books (UK)
- Publication place: United States
- ISBN: 978-0316479837

The Man Who Came Uptown is a 2018 novel by George Pelecanos – his twenty-first – about Michael Hudson, a man who after being released from incarceration struggles with doing the right thing despite it not being the easiest; the novel also addresses Pelecanos's repeated theme of the "redemptive power of books".

== Plot ==
The novel begins with a private investigator (PI), Philip Ornazian, interviewing a prisoner named Antonius about a failed robbery attempt. Antonius and three other men attempted to rob a drug store in the middle of summer while wearing long sleeves and masks. Ornazian is attempting to ask who came up with the plan, but Antonius refuses to give the other man up because he lives by a code saying he is not as bad as the true criminals in the world. Ornazian's PI business is based in Washington DC; he is partnered with another retired cop and they conspire to rob criminals of their stolen money. This is how they make most of their income. During one of their jobs they ask Michael Hudson to be their getaway driver.

== Theme ==
The Man Who Came Uptown has themes that run through the novel about the redemptive power of books after Hudson begins to read in jail. It also follows his choices between right or wrong.
