= Howard "Bunny" Colvin =

Character from The Wire

Howard Colvin
- The Wire character
- Robert Wisdom as Bunny Colvin
- First appearance: "Stray Rounds" (2003)
- Last appearance: "Late Editions" (2008)
- Created by: David Simon
- Portrayed by: Robert Wisdom

In-universe information
- Alias: Bunny
- Gender: Male
- Title(s): Major; Lieutenant
- Occupation: Commander of the Western District in Baltimore Police department Head of hotel security Academic aide in University of Maryland's Social Sciences research department
- Spouse: Lolita
- Children: Two unnamed, Namond Brice (adopted)

Howard "Bunny" Colvin is a fictional character on the HBO drama The Wire, played by actor Robert Wisdom. Colvin is a wise and able police major in the Baltimore's Western District, alienated by the careerism and bureaucracy rampant in the Baltimore Police Department and the detrimental social effects of the war on drugs. Close to retirement, he secretly breaks chain of command and puts his resources into "Hamsterdam", three zones within his district where drug dealers are pressured to non-violently congregate in exchange for informal legal sanction.

Colvin also concentrates policing in these areas and attracts important ground-level social services, such as needle and condom distribution. Despite unprecedented statistical gains, Colvin is forced to retire from the force. He later becomes a field researcher alongside academic Dr. David Parenti in Baltimore city schools. In this role, Colvin falls into the guardianship of Namond Brice.

== Character storyline ==
Colvin joined the Baltimore Police Department in 1973, patrolling his home neighborhood in Baltimore's Western District. Over his tenure, he advanced to the rank of district commander in the Western. Colvin's philosophy of policing involves protecting the community he serves by making quality arrests through the use of trusted informants on his foot post.

As a commander, he insists that his men learn their foot post and urges them to focus on doing real police work. Toward the end of his career, he begins seeing the war on drugs as an ineffective waste of time and resources that has led to many needless casualties in his district.

=== Season two ===
Colvin is at the scene when a child is accidentally shot during a turf war, appalled at the senselessness of the killing. When ordered to crack down on the area, his second in command, Dennis Mello, states that they waited too long to make the arrests they had. Colvin begins to question if they are actually doing their job.

=== Season three ===
Colvin, months away from being eligible to retire on a major's pension, decides to make a last effort to have a real impact on the community. He recognizes that much of his time and resources are spent on policing addicts and low level dealers, which never improves the situation in his district and leaves little time for "real" police work. All of Baltimore's district majors are under extreme pressure to reduce the city's violent crime rate from Mayor Clarence Royce, who is seeking re-election.

After Commissioner Ervin Burrell relieves Major Marvin Taylor from his post commanding the Eastern District due to his poor performance, other district commanders begin "juking" their stats to make crime rates appear to drop. Colvin refuses to do this, and his stats honestly reflect a 2% rise in felonies. He is quickly chewed out by Deputy Commissioner William Rawls, while Burrell threatens to have him replaced.

Colvin wonders if there is a way for low-level users to take drugs safely without facing punishment. After the attempted murder of Kenneth Dozerman, Colvin decides that he will independently set up three "free zones" in the Western where addicts and dealers can conduct their business under supervision, but without interference. This moves the drug trade into a controlled, uninhabited area to protect the rest of his district.

Colvin does not seek the permission or approval of his superiors before implementing his plan, and ignores the concerns of his subordinates, including Mello and Ellis Carver, who are charged with ensuring no violence takes place within the free zones. One of these areas becomes known as "Hamsterdam", after Amsterdam's liberal drug laws. Because his retirement is imminent and he is guaranteed a pension, Colvin believes he'll be free from any consequences should his plan be discovered. Legalizing drugs in Hamsterdam allows him to redirect police resources to quality felony cases elsewhere.

After implementing the Hamsterdam plan for five weeks, Colvin delivers a cumulative 14% reduction in the felony rate, unheard of in the Western's history. Colvin is forced to take his vacation time immediately after revealing his experiment to Rawls and Burrell. Royce considers trying to spin Hamsterdam as an enforcement strategy because of its success in lowering the crime rate. However, in the meantime, Herc leaks information about Hamsterdam to the press after rejecting Carver's request to help him move a homicide victim off the free zone premises.

After realizing that public opinion is sharply against the free zones, and that there are broader political ramifications (the White House's Deputy Drug Czar threatens to pull all Federal funding from the city if the entire endeavor isn't immediately ended and publicly negated), Royce recants and decides to end the Hamsterdam experiment. Burrell and Rawls force Colvin into becoming a scapegoat by threatening to persecute his officers. He is demoted to lieutenant and thus gets a lowered pension. Burrell also contacts Johns Hopkins University and convinces them to withdraw a job offer for their campus security force.

As a commanding officer, Colvin is well liked by his men. Colvin has a major impact on Carver, convincing him to reassess his role as DEU sergeant and to take a more community-minded approach to policing. He also reconnects with Jimmy McNulty, who had started out as a beat officer under his command. Colvin's last piece of detective work involves McNulty's Major Case Unit: Stringer Bell contacts Colvin to inform on Avon Barksdale, and Colvin passes the information on to McNulty. In Colvin, Stringer sees a fellow reformer who feels his superiors are preventing useful work from being done. As Bell puts it, they are "both trying to make sense of this game," though from opposite sides of the law.

=== Season four ===
Colvin attempts to supplement his diminished pension by working as the head of security for a downtown hotel. He becomes disillusioned with the post when the hotel manager refuses to let him arrest a wealthy client who had assaulted a prostitute in his hotel room, and quits the job soon thereafter. Later, he is approached with another job from The Deacon, who has learned of a large grant to the University of Maryland to look at repeat violent offenders.

The study is led by Dr. David Parenti. Colvin has developed a reputation among academics as a result of his Hamsterdam experiment, and the Deacon helps him secure a job offer with Parenti as a field researcher. Parenti initially plans to focus on 18- to 21-year-olds, but Colvin convinces Parenti to look at Edward Tilghman Middle School for his target group.

Colvin identifies for Parenti the two types of West Baltimore students: "stoop" kids who obey their parents' instructions and who are respectful of authority, and "corner" kids, the kids who sell drugs, disrupt class, and are aspiring gangsters disrespectful of authority. Together, they isolate ten corner kids into a classroom where Parenti and a UM doctoral student study them while Colvin acts as the mediator. In this classroom, no suspensions are handed down to misbehaving students, as it is seen as a punishment the students often utilize to get out of class intentionally.

Colvin begins to take an interest in Namond Brice, one of the most disruptive students. He allows Namond to stay at his home when Carver arrests him for selling drugs and his mother is out of town. Colvin takes him home the next day and sees first hand that his mother is pushing him into drug dealing. After seeing how Namond has progressed in school, Colvin sees Namond's potential and realizes he will only get himself killed or arrested if he remains in his current household. He also learns from Principal Marcia Donnelly that funding for his school programme has been cut, meaning his programme will not continue.

Colvin then talks with Wee-Bey Brice, Namond's incarcerated father, explaining Namond could have a life outside of West Baltimore given the proper support from Colvin and his wife. After thinking it over, Wee-Bey tells Namond's mother to send him to live with Colvin as he wants him to have a future. Namond is seen to be living with Colvin and his wife at the conclusion of season four.

=== Season five ===
Colvin appears briefly with a gray and white goatee, attending Namond's high school competitive debate. He looks displeased when Mayor Tommy Carcetti visits the event, using it to burnish his political image. Outside the debate, Carcetti approaches Colvin and apologizes for being unable to support the Hamsterdam experiment, saying no politician could run with the idea politically despite hinting at the time that he supported the initiative. Colvin refuses to shake Carcetti's extended hand, as he is still aggreived over the fact the mayor cut the funding for his school support programme and leaves the Mayor ashamed and speechless when he bluntly says "well then, Mr. Mayor, I guess there's nothing more to be done".
