= Late Editions =

- The Wire episode
- Episode no.: Season 5 Episode 9
- Directed by: Joe Chappelle
- Story by: David Simon; George Pelecanos
- Teleplay by: George Pelecanos
- Original air date: March 2, 2008
- Running time: 60 minutes

Episode chronology
← Previous "Clarifications"	Next → "–30–"

"Late Editions" is the ninth episode of the fifth season of the HBO original series The Wire, the penultimate episode of the series. The episode was written by George Pelecanos from a story by David Simon and George Pelecanos and was directed by Joe Chappelle. It aired on March 2, 2008.

== Plot ==
In a meeting with Snoop and Levy, O-Dog reluctantly agrees to take the charge for Snoop and Partlow. Levy tells O-Dog he might have to do a short stretch but assures him that he will be well-compensated. At the Baltimore Sun, Gus enlists an old colleague, Robert Ruby, to do fact-checking on Templeton's articles.

Garrick and Dozerman are watching the warehouse at the docks while Partlow is inspecting a shipment and then they see Cheese and his crew arrive. Rawls and Daniels express their frustration to Steintorf, who tells them to continue manipulating the crime statistics. While Freamon tells Daniels about the sting on Marlo, Sydnor calls to tell him they caught Monk "riding dirty." In the resulting raid, the narcotics shipment is seized while Marlo, Partlow, and Cheese are arrested. After Mayor Carcetti gives a rousing speech about the raid, Alma attempts to interview Daniels, who is still upset because of the fabricated remarks Templeton attributed to him in the Sun. As Marlo and his crew sit in jail, a comment by Monk about Omar causes Marlo to go into an angry tirade. The crew debates whether Michael was the snitch. McNulty becomes depressed at the situation he has put himself in with his serial killer hoax. Templeton continues to get praise for his fabricated stories, which he learns might give him a shot at a Pulitzer Prize. Gus scratches the quote Alma received from Daniels and his suspicion of Templeton flares up once again.

Colvin and his wife proudly watch Namond deliver a speech about AIDS at a youth debate event. Mayor Carcetti appears and tries to apologize for not supporting the Hamsterdam project, failing to mention how his budget cuts terminated Colvin and Parenti's pilot program. Carcetti is frozen out by the bitter Colvin. McNulty works the serial killer case with little enthusiasm and is ordered by Landsman to go to the scene of another homeless man's death. After questioning Templeton, Gus goes to the Walter Reed Army Medical Center to investigate Templeton's writing regarding Terry, the homeless Iraq War veteran. He meets a patient who verifies that Terry served, and that he was not involved in a firefight on the day Templeton had claimed. Bubbles continues talking with Fletcher, and takes him to a Narcotics Anonymous meeting where he finally opens up about Sherrod's death (without mentioning his own involvement, however).

Freamon meets Senator Davis and manages to get information on Levy's corrupt dealings. Marlo talks with Levy and comes to the conclusion that no one on his crew snitched because everyone who knows about the clock messages is locked up and charged. Greggs approaches Carver, who indicates that he has made peace with his decision to bring police brutality charges against Colicchio. Carver's words convince her to go to Daniels with her knowledge about McNulty's conduct. Daniels and Pearlman visit evidence control and realize that the tapped phone that was supposed to be the "serial killer's" actually belonged to Marlo.

Snoop tells Michael that with everyone locked up, she needs him for some "serious business" and tells him that there is no need for him to bring his gun because she has a "clean one" for him on location. Realizing he's the target, Michael follows Partlow's advice and catches Snoop at the hit's location beforehand. He takes the clean gun stashed there and kills Snoop with it on the way to the supposed hit. Michael goes home to find Duquan watching a TV show about a serial killer who only kills serial killers and asks him to pack up. He, Dukie and Bug pack and drive to his aunt's house in Howard County. Michael walks Bug to the door with a shoebox full of cash. Back in Baltimore, Michael tells Dukie that it would be too dangerous for them to stay together. At Dukie's request, he drives him to the squalid area where the junk man lives among homeless people and junkies. Dukie recalls the day when they "threw the piss-balloons at the terrace boys", but Michael responds that he does not remember. Dukie hesitates when he sees a man injecting heroin and turns back to Michael but he has already left.

== Production ==
=== Epigraph ===
Deserve got nuthin' to do with it.

— Snoop, in Late Editions

As the series winds down, many of its principal players will be fired, honored, arrested, acquitted, or killed. A central tenet of the series is that the ethics of the characters dictate these fates much less than the uncontrollable machinations of the 21st-century city. This is also a direct quote from 1992's Unforgiven.

=== Non-fiction elements ===
Lester mentions to Leander that they will "need a Title 3" before being able to use the evidence found on Marlo's crew phones. This refers to the Title III of The Omnibus Crime Control and Safe Streets Act of 1968 (Wiretap Act), whereby for example, agents need to indicate on the Title 3 affidavit probable cause ("PC"). PC has been mentioned throughout the series.

Lester also mentions to Daniels he needs an "S.-and-s. warrant", that is, a search and seizure warrant, requested by the "S.A.O." (State Attorney Office).

When Gus tells Steve he needs to get into Walter Reed, Steve reminds him that as a journalist, after the "Post" unveiled a scandal there in 2007, he may not be welcome.

=== Credits ===
==== Starring cast ====
Although credited, Michael Kenneth Williams, who plays Omar Little, does not appear in this episode.

==== Guest stars ====
- Robert Wisdom as Howard "Bunny" Colvin
- Julito McCullum as Namond Brice
- Felicia Pearson as Felicia "Snoop" Pearson
- Steve Earle as Walon
- Method Man as Melvin "Cheese" Wagstaff
- Delaney Williams as Jay Landsman
- Marlyne Afflack as Nerese Campbell
- David Costabile as Thomas Klebanow
- Sam Freed as James Whiting
- Darrell Britt-Gibson as Darius "O-Dog" Hill
- Edward Green as Spider
- Kwame Patterson as Monk Metcalf
- Tom McCarthy as Tim Phelps
- Robert Poletick as Steven Luxenberg
- William F. Zorzi as Bill Zorzi
- Michael Mosley as Raymond Wiley
- Donald Neal as Jay Spry
- Stephen Schnetzer as Robert Ruby
- Brandon Young as Mike Fletcher
- Keenon Brice as Aaron "Bug" Manigault
- Eisa Davis as Rae - Bubbles' sister
- Dawn Ursula as Lolita Colvin
- Melvin Williams as The Deacon
- Nat Benchley as Augustus Polk
- Bobby Brown as Bobby Brown
- Rick Otto as Kenneth Dozerman
- Ryan Sands as Officer Lloyd "Truck" Garrick
- Bryan Anderson as Marino
- Reggie A. Green as Arabber
- Kathy Lally as Kathy Lally
- Pam Spilliadis as Pam Spiliadis
- Dennis Hill as Detective Christeson
- Jason Moffett as Tony
- Mary Beth Wise as Karen
- Jon Jolles as Sun librarian
- D.L. Hopkins as hack driver
- Dimitros "Jimmy" Stakias as Greek deliveryman
- Ayanna Fleming as unknown
- Kim Bogues as unknown
- Charlie Limber as unknown

==== Uncredited appearances ====
- Todd Scofield as Jeff Price
- Brian E. McLarney as Brian McLarney
- Marcus Hamm as Marcus
