= Down by the River Where the Dead Men Go =

1995 novel by George Pelecanos

- First edition cover
- Author: George Pelecanos
- Publisher: St. Martin's Press
- Publication date: January 1, 1995
- Preceded by: Nick's Trip

Down by the River Where the Dead Men Go is a 1995 novel by American writer George Pelecanos. It is the third book of a trilogy with the same protagonist, Nick Stefanos.

== Plot ==
In this volume, Stefanos has retired from his previous job as a crime investigator in Washington D.C., and makes a living as a bartender at a local bar. He struggles with his growing unhappiness and tries to drown it in alcohol. He gets drawn into the murder of Calvin Jeter and his conscience pulls him back to his earlier occupation. It becomes a journey through the harshest part of the American capital and the blackest part of the human soul.
