= Right as Rain =

2001 crime novel by George Pelecanos

- First edition cover
- Author: George Pelecanos
- Language: English
- Series: Strange and Quinn
- Genre: Crime novel
- Publisher: Little Brown
- Publication date: February 2001
- Publication place: United States
- Media type: Print (Hardback & Paperback)
- Pages: 336 pp
- ISBN: 0316695262 (Hardcover first edition)
- OCLC: 44128318
- Dewey Decimal: 813/.54 21
- LC Class: PS3566.E354 R54 2001
- Followed by: Hell to Pay

Right as Rain is a 2001 crime novel by George Pelecanos. It is set in Washington DC and focuses on private investigator Derek Strange and his new partner Terry Quinn. It is the first novel to involve the characters and is followed by Hell to Pay (2002), Soul Circus (2003) and Hard Revolution (2004).

== Plot ==
The novel follows private investigator Derek Strange as he works on several cases in Washington DC. Strange's main case is to investigate the death of Chris Wilson. Strange focuses on ex-cop Terry Quinn who shot Wilson. Both were police officers and the shooting led to Quinn's discharge from the police department. The shooting was high profile and characterised as racially motivated; Quinn is caucasian while Wilson was African American. Quinn becomes involved in the investigation himself as he is desperate to clear his conscience.
