= George Pelecanos =

American author (born 1957)

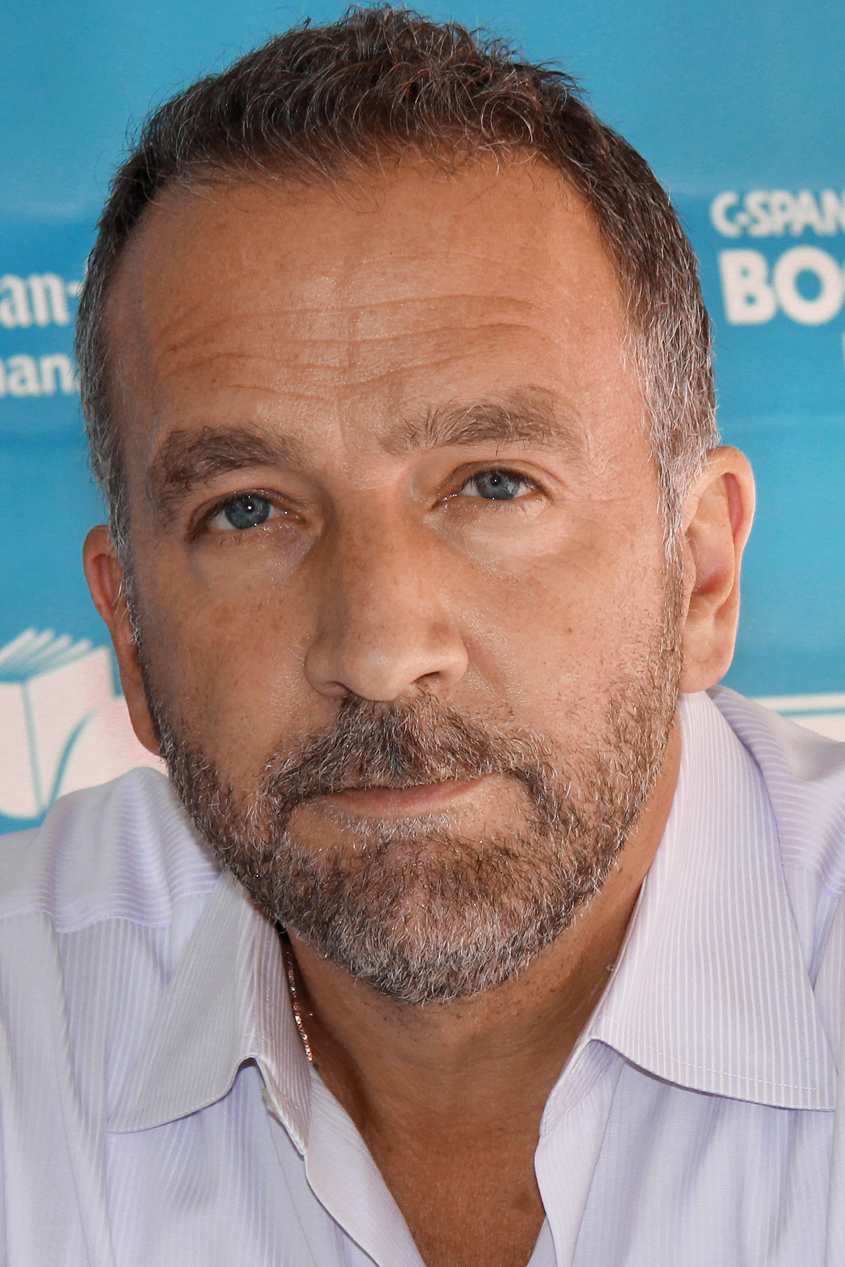
- Pelecanos in 2013
- Born: February 18, 1957 (age 69); Washington, D.C., U.S.
- Occupations: Novelist; journalist; television writer
- Writing career
- Genre: Detective fiction
- Website: www.hachettebookgroup.com/features/georgepelecanos/

George P. Pelecanos (born February 18, 1957) is an American author, producer, and television writer. Many of his 20 books are in the genre of detective fiction and set primarily in his hometown of Washington, D.C. On television, he frequently collaborates with David Simon, writing multiple episodes of Simon's HBO series The Wire and Treme, and is also the co-creator (with Simon) of the HBO series The Deuce and We Own This City.

== Early life ==
Pelecanos was born in Washington, D.C., on February 18, 1957. He is a Greek American.

== Career ==
=== Novelist ===
Inspired by the works of Elmore Leonard, Dashiell Hammett, Raymond Chandler, John D. MacDonald, Ross Macdonald, Mickey Spillane, and John le Carré, he began his career as an author of crime fiction.

Pelecanos's early novels were written in the first person voice of Nick Stefanos, a Greek resident of Washington, D.C., and sometime private investigator.

After the success of his first four novels, the Stefanos-narrated A Firing Offense, Nick's Trip, and Down by the River Where the Dead Men Go, and the non-series (though some characters do cross over) Shoedog, Pelecanos switched his narrative style considerably and expanded the scope of his fiction with his D.C. Quartet. He has commented that he did not feel he had the ability to be this ambitious earlier in his career. The quartet, often compared to James Ellroy's L.A. Quartet, spanned several decades and communities within the changing population of Washington. Now writing in the third person, Pelecanos relegated Stefanos to a supporting character and introduced his first "salt and pepper" team of crime fighters, Dimitri Karras and Marcus Clay.

In The Big Blowdown, set a generation before Karras and Clay would appear (the 1950s), Pelecanos followed the lives of dozens of D.C. residents, tracking the challenges and changes that the second half of the twentieth century presented to Washingtonians. King Suckerman, set in the 1970s and generally regarded as the fans' favorite, introduced the recurring theme of basketball in Pelecanos' fiction. Typically, he employs the sport as a symbol of cooperation amongst the races, suggesting the dynamism of D.C. as reflective of the good will generated by multi-ethnic pick up games. However, he also indulges the reverse of the equation, wherein the basketball court becomes the site of unresolved hostilities. In such cases, violent criminal behavior typically emerges amongst the participants, usually escalating the mystery. The Sweet Forever (1980s) and Shame the Devil (1990s) closed the quartet and Pelecanos retired Stefanos and the other characters that populated the novels. (Stefanos and other characters do reappear in subsequent works).

In 2001, he introduced a new team of private detectives, Derek Strange and Terry Quinn, as the protagonists of Right as Rain. They have subsequently starred in the author's more recent works Hell to Pay (which won a Gumshoe Award in 2003) and Soul Circus. While these books have cemented the author's reputation as one of the best current American crime writers and sold consistently, they have not garnered the critical and cult affection his D.C. quartet did. Rather, they seem to be continuing the author's well received formula of witty protagonists chasing unconflicted criminals behind the backdrop of popular culture references and D.C. landmarks.

Perhaps sensing this, Pelecanos again switched his focus in his 2004 novel, Hard Revolution, taking one of his new detectives, Derek Strange, back in time to his early days on the D.C. police force. In another interesting move, Pelecanos attached a CD to the book itself, emulating Michael Connelly who included a CD with his 2003 Harry Bosch book Lost Light.

In 2005, Pelecanos saw another novel published, Drama City. This book revisited the examination of dogfighting begun in his book Hell To Pay. Pelecanos is a dog owner and has written about his views of dogfighting.

In 2006, he published The Night Gardener, which represented a major change of style and which featured a cameo of himself. Pelecanos has also published short fiction in a variety of anthologies and magazines, including Measures of Poison and Usual Suspects. His reviews have been published in The Washington Post Book World, The New York Times Book Review, and elsewhere.

The Turnaround was published in August 2008, reflecting a return to his roots, as the novel opens in the 70s in a Greek diner, and a continuation of his more modern style in the portion set in the present. The Turnaround won the 2008's Hammett Prize.

In 2011, Pelecanos published The Cut, introducing the character Spero Lucas, a young veteran of the Iraq war. The former Marine works part-time as a private investigator for a D.C. defense attorney as well as taking jobs finding stolen items for a 40% cut of the value of the returned item. In 2013, Pelecanos published The Double, the second Spero Lucas book.

Pelecanos has in turn influenced other novelists. They include Kristen Lepionka, who won the Shamus Award for Best First P.I. Novel in 2018. Lepionka cited his "lean, laconic prose." The introduction to a 2018 interview with William Boyle pointed to Pelecanos's influence on Boyle, in particular as a "meticulous chronicler of process."

=== Film and television ===
Pelecanos has written and produced for HBO's The Wire and is part of a literary circle with The Wire creator David Simon and novelist Laura Lippman. Simon sought out Pelecanos after reading his work. Simon was recommended his novels several times but did not read his work initially because of territorial prejudice; Simon is from Baltimore. Once Simon received further recommendations, including one from Lippman, he tried The Sweet Forever and changed his mind. The two writers have much in common including a childhood in Silver Spring, Maryland, attendance at the University of Maryland, and their interest in the "fate of the American city and the black urban poor". They first met at the funeral of a mutual friend shortly after Simon delivered the pilot episode. Simon pitched Pelecanos the idea of The Wire as a novel for television about the American city as Pelecanos drove him home. Pelecanos was excited about the prospect of writing something more than simple mystery for television as he strived to exceed the boundaries of genre in his novels.

Pelecanos joined the crew as a writer for the first season in 2002. He wrote the teleplay for the season's penultimate episode, "Cleaning Up", from a story by Simon and Ed Burns. Pelecanos was promoted to producer for the second season in 2003. He wrote the teleplay for the episodes "Duck and Cover" and "Bad Dreams" from stories he co-wrote with Simon. He remained a writer and producer for the third season in 2004. He wrote the teleplay for the episodes "Hamsterdam" and "Middle Ground" from stories he co-wrote with Simon. Simon wrote the teleplay for the episode "Slapstick" from a story he co-wrote with Pelecanos. Simon and Pelecanos' collaboration on "Middle Ground" received the show's first Emmy Award nomination, in the category Outstanding Writing for a Drama Series. Pelecanos left the production staff of The Wire after the show's third season to concentrate on writing his novel The Night Gardener. His role as a producer was taken on by Eric Overmyer.

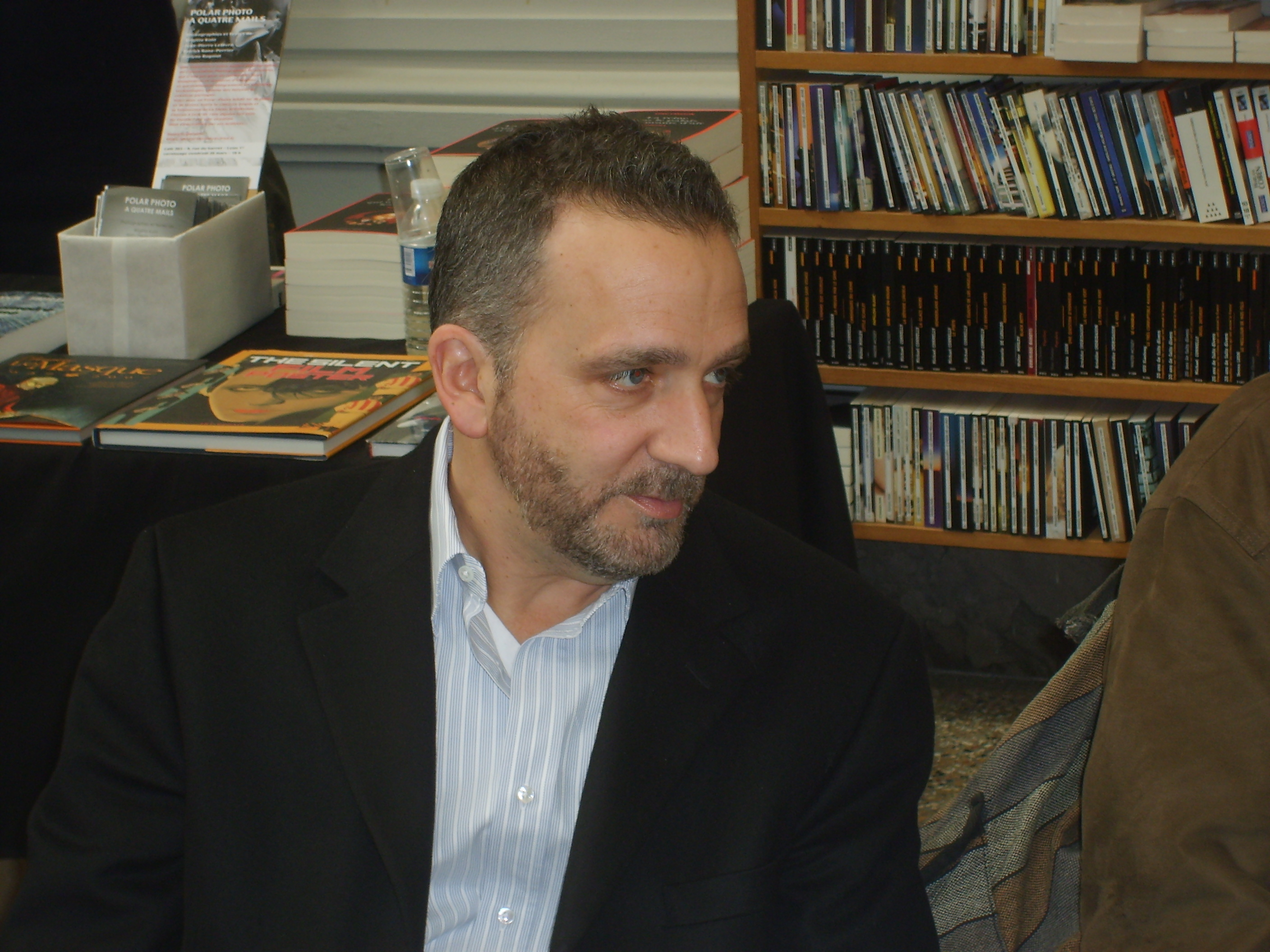
Pelecanos at Quais du Polar in Lyon, France, in 2008

Pelecanos remained a writer for the fourth season in 2006. He wrote the teleplay for the penultimate episode "That's Got His Own" from a story he co-wrote with producer Ed Burns. Simon has commented that he missed having Pelecanos working on the show full-time but was a fan of The Night Gardener. Simon also spent time embedded with a homicide unit while researching his own book Homicide: A Year on the Killing Streets. Pelecanos and the writing staff won the Writers Guild of America (WGA) Award for Best Dramatic Series at the February 2008 ceremony and the 2007 Edgar Award for Best Television Feature/Mini-Series Teleplay for their work on the fourth season. Pelecanos returned as a writer for the series fifth and final season. He wrote the teleplay for the episode "Late Editions" from a story he co-wrote with Simon. Pelecanos and the writing staff were again nominated for the WGA award for Best Dramatic Series at the February 2009 ceremony for their work on the fifth season but Mad Men won the award.

Following the conclusion of The Wire Pelecanos joined the crew of the HBO World War II mini-series The Pacific as a co-producer and writer. After a lengthy production process the series aired in 2010. He co-wrote "Part 3" of the series with fellow co-producer Michelle Ashford. The episode focused on Marines on leave in Australia and featured a displaced Greek family in a prominent guest role. Pelecanos saw the project as a chance to make a tribute to his father, Pete Pelecanos, who served as a Marine in the Philippines.

Also in 2010 Pelecanos joined the crew of HBO New Orleans drama Treme as a writer. The series was created by Simon and Overmeyer. It follows the lives of residents of the Tremé neighborhood after Hurricane Katrina. Pelecanos wrote the teleplay for the episode "At the Foot of Canal Street" from a story he co-wrote with Overmyer. Pelecanos returned as a Consulting Producer and writer for the second season in 2011. He joined the crew full-time as a writer and executive producer for the third season in 2012. He remained in this role for the fourth and final season in 2013.

Following the conclusion of Treme Pelecanos worked with Overmyer on his next series Bosch. The series was developed by Overmyer and is based on the series of novels by Michael Connelly. The series stars The Wire alumni Jamie Hector and Lance Reddick. Pelecanos and Michael Connelly co-wrote the show's fourth episode "Fugazi".

In 2017, HBO premiered The Deuce, a new series developed by Pelecanos and David Simon. The show focuses on the birth of the pornography industry in 1970s Times Square. George also co-authored several of the teleplays, including the pilot, with Simon, and co-authored episodes with Richard Price and Lisa Lutz.

In 2019, Pelecanos' D.C. Noir anthology was made into a film featuring several short fictional crime stories which take place in Washington, D.C. Pelecanos wrote the film and also served as a director and executive producer. The film was shot on location in Washington, D.C., and is reminiscent of HBO's The Wire.

He is currently developing a series based on his Derek Strange character for HBO. The first season will be based on the Derek Strange novel Hard Revolution. More recently, he signed an overall deal with HBO.

=== Personal life ===
As of 2006, Pelecanos lives in Silver Spring, Maryland, a suburb of Washington, D.C. with his wife and three children.

== Published works ==
=== Novels ===
==== Standalone novels ====
- Shoedog (1994). ISBN 0312110618
- Drama City (2005). ISBN 0316608211
- The Night Gardener (2006). ISBN 978-0316156509
- The Turnaround (2008). ISBN 978-0316156479
- The Way Home (2009). ISBN 978-0316156493
- The Man Who Came Uptown (2018) ISBN 978-0316479820

==== Nick Stefanos series ====
- A Firing Offense (1992). ISBN 0312069707
- Nick's Trip (1993). ISBN 0312088620
- Down by the River Where the Dead Men Go (1995). ISBN 0312130562

==== D.C. Quartet series ====
- The Big Blowdown (1996). ISBN 0312142846
- King Suckerman (1997). ISBN 0316695904
- The Sweet Forever (1998). ISBN 0316691097
- Shame the Devil (2000). ISBN 0316695238

==== Derek Strange and Terry Quinn series ====
- Right as Rain (2001). ISBN 0316695262
- Hell to Pay (2002). ISBN 0316695068
- Soul Circus (2003). ISBN 0316608432
- Hard Revolution (2004). ISBN 0316608971
- What It Was (2012). ISBN 978-0316209533
- The Blue Flame (2026). ISBN 978-1-5387-7910-1

==== Spero Lucas series ====
- The Cut (2011). ISBN 978-0316078429
- The Double (2013). ISBN 978-0316078399

=== Short fiction ===
==== Collections ====
- The Martini Shot (2015). ISBN 978-0316284370
- Owning Up (2024). ISBN 978-0316570473

==== Edited anthologies ====
- D.C. Noir (2006). ISBN 978-1888451900
- D.C. Noir 2: The Classics (2008). ISBN 978-1933354583
- Best American Mystery Stories 2008, with Otto Penzler (2008). ISBN 978-0618812677

=== Essays, reporting and other contributions ===
- Pelecanos, George (June 10–17, 2013). "Twisted". True Crimes. The New Yorker. Vol. 89, no. 17. pp. 54–55.

== Filmography ==
Production staff

Year	Show	Role	Notes
2022	We Own This City	Executive Producer	Season 1
2019	D.C. Noir	Writer, Director, Executive Producer	Anthology Film
2017	The Deuce	Executive Producer	Season 1
2013	Treme	Executive Producer	Season 4
2012	Treme	Executive Producer	Season 3
2011	Treme	Consulting Producer	Season 2
2010	The Pacific	Co-Producer	Mini-series
2004	The Wire	Producer	Season 3
2003	The Wire	Writer	Season 1

Writer

Year	Show	Season	Episode title	Episode	Notes
2022	We Own this City	1	"Part One"	1	co-written with David Simon
2022	We Own this City	1	"Part Five"	5	
2017	The Deuce	1	"Pilot"	1	co-written with David Simon
2017	The Deuce	1	"Show and Prove"	2	co-written with Richard Price
2017	The Deuce	1	"I See Money"	4	Teleplay by Lisa Lutz, story by Pelecanos and Lisa Lutz
2017	The Deuce	1	"My Name Is Ruby"	8	co-written with David Simon
2011	Treme	2	"What is New Orleans?"	9	Teleplay by Pelecanos, story by Pelecanos and David Simon
2010	Treme	1	"At the Foot of Canal Street"	4	Teleplay by Pelecanos, story by Pelecanos and Eric Overmyer
2010	The Pacific	1	Part 3	3	Co-written with Michelle Ashford
2008	The Wire	5	"Late Editions"	9	Teleplay by Pelecanos, story by Pelecanos and David Simon
2006	The Wire	4	"That's Got His Own"	12	Teleplay by Pelecanos, story by Pelecanos and Ed Burns
2004	The Wire	3	"Middle Ground"	11	Teleplay by Pelecanos, story by Pelecanos and David Simon
2004	The Wire	3	"Slapstick"	9	Teleplay by David Simon, story by Pelecanos and David Simon
2004	The Wire	3	"Hamsterdam"	4	Teleplay by Pelecanos, story by Pelecanos and David Simon
2003	The Wire	2	"Bad Dreams"	11	Teleplay by Pelecanos, story by Pelecanos and David Simon
2003	The Wire	2	"Duck and Cover"	8	Teleplay by Pelecanos, story by Pelecanos and David Simon
2002	The Wire	1	"Cleaning Up"	12	Teleplay by Pelecanos, story by David Simon and Ed Burns

== Awards ==
Year	Award	Category	Result	Work	Notes
2009	Writers Guild of America Award	Outstanding Dramatic Series	Nominated	The Wire season 5	Shared with Ed Burns, Chris Collins, Dennis Lehane, David Mills, Richard Price, David Simon and William F. Zorzi
2008	Writers Guild of America Award	Outstanding Dramatic Series	Won	The Wire season 4	Shared with Ed Burns, Chris Collins, Kia Corthron, Dennis Lehane, David Mills, Eric Overmyer, Richard Price, David Simon and William F. Zorzi
2007	Edgar Award	Best Television Feature/Mini-Series Teleplay	Won	The Wire season 4	Shared with Ed Burns, Kia Corthron, Dennis Lehane, David Mills, Eric Overmyer, Richard Price, David Simon and William F. Zorzi
2005	Emmy Award	Outstanding Writing for a Drama Series	Nominated	The Wire episode "Middle Ground"	Shared with co-writer David Simon
1999	Maltese Falcon Award, Japan	Best hardboiled mystery novel published in Japan	Won	The Big Blowdown	
