= List of fellows of the Minerals, Metals & Materials Society =

The Minerals, Metals & Materials Society honors members with the designation Fellow for having made significant accomplishments to the field of materials science and engineering.

== 1963 ==
- James Austin
- John Chipman
- Morris Cohen
- Lawrence Darken
- Walter R. Hibbard Jr.
- Augustus Kinzel
- Robert Mehl
- F. Richardson
- Reinardt Schuhmann Jr.
- Cyril Stanley Smith

== 1964 ==
- Edgar Bain
- Charles Barrett
- Karl Fetters
- Francis Frary
- Zay Jeffries
- Thomas Joseph
- Charles Kuzell
- Champion Mathewson
- Ronald McNaughton
- Albert Phillips
- Leo Reinartz
- Earle Schumacher
- Robert Sosman
- Carl Wagner
- Clyde Williams

== 1965 ==
- Paul Beck
- Bruce Chalmers
- G. Kurdyumov
- Carleton Long
- Oscar Marzke

== 1966 ==
- Pol Duwez
- Werner Koster
- Earl Parker
- William Pfann
- Jack Scaff

== 1967 ==
- Harold Emerick
- Sir Charles Goodeve
- Paul Queneau
- George Roberts
- J. Smart Jr.

== 1968 ==
- Marc Allard
- Earl Bunce
- John Elliott
- Benjamin Lustman
- Lloyd Pidgeon

== 1969 ==
- Gerhard Derge
- William Harris Jr.
- J. Hollomon
- Maurice Shank
- Kent Van Horn

== 1970 ==
- John Dorn
- Frank Forward
- Bruce Gonser
- Michael Tenenbaum

== 1971 ==
- Mars Fontana
- Maxwell Gensamer
- Julius Harwood
- Frederick Rhines
- David Swan

== 1972 ==
- John Convey
- Robert Jaffee
- Herbert Kellogg
- Max Lightner
- William Manly

== 1973 ==
- John Frye Jr.
- William Philbrook
- Raymond Smith

== 1974 ==
- Tasuku Fuwa
- John Hirth
- John Low Jr.
- Albert Schlechten
- Clarence Sims

== 1975 ==
- Morris Fine
- Thomas Ingraham
- James Keeler
- Thomas King
- Harold Paxton

== 1976 ==
- James Fulton
- George St. Pierre
- Charles Taylor
- David Turnbull
- Milton Wadsworth
- Victor Zackay

== 1977 ==
- Jagdish Agarwal
- W. Lankford Jr.
- Arthur Nowick
- William Opie
- Terkel Rosenqvist

== 1978 ==
- Robert Balluffi
- Thomas Henrie
- Carl McHargue
- Frederick Rosi

== 1979 ==
- Robert Lund
- Robert Maddin
- Allen Russell
- Paul Shewmon
- Gareth Thomas

== 1980 ==
- Wayne Hazen
- Mats Hillert
- Eugene Machlin
- Dale Stein
- Jack Wernick

== 1981 ==
- Charles Alcock
- George Ansell
- Gilbert Chin
- Jerome Cohen
- Nicholas Grant

== 1982 ==
- G. Couch
- Robert Rapp

== 1983 ==
- John Cahn
- Robert Pehlke
- Guy Pound
- Francis VerSnyder
- Charles Wert

== 1984 ==
- Hubert Aaronson
- Charles McMahon Jr.
- Alexander Troiano

== 1985 ==
- James Li
- Oleg Sherby

== 1986 ==
- Ernest Peters

== 1987 ==
- Kenneth Jackson
- U. Kocks

== 1988 ==
- William Nix
- King-Ning Tu
- C. Wayman
- Fred Weinberg

== 1989 ==
- J. Brimacombe
- Merton Flemings
- Thaddeus Massalski
- E. Verink Jr.

== 1990 ==
- Karl Gschneidner Jr.
- John Kirkaldy
- Nikolas Themelis
- Johannes Weertman
- Albert Westwood

== 1991 ==
- Y. Chang
- William Leslie
- Takeshi Nagano
- Peter Tarassoff
- Ethem Turkdogan

== 1992 ==
- J. Embury
- Bhakta Rath
- John Stringer

== 1993 ==
- George Dieter
- Julian Szekely
- Julia Weertman

== 1994 ==
- Martin Glicksman
- Chain Liu
- Vladimir Mackiw

== 1995 ==
- Howard Birnbaum
- Robert Mehrabian

== 1996 ==
- John J. Gilman
- William Mullins
- Frans Spaepen
- David Williams

== 1997 ==
- Alan Ardell
- Carolyn Hansson
- Terence Mitchell
- David Seidman

== 1998 ==
- Richard Arsenault
- Ye Chou
- Siegfried Hecker
- Ryoichi Kikuchi*
- James Williams

== 1999 ==
- Subhash Mahajan
- Jagdish Narayan
- Vaclav Vitek

== 2000 ==
- Reza Abbaschian
- Robert Cahn*
- Lionel Kimerling
- Subra Suresh
- Jeffrey Wadsworth

== 2001 ==
- Stan David
- Sungho Jin
- Carl Koch
- John Morris Jr.
- Gregory Olson

== 2002 ==
- Gary Purdy
- Ricardo Schwarz
- Changxu Shi*
- Edgar Starke
- Man Yoo*

== 2003 ==
- Hans Conrad
- Didier de Fontaine
- William Johnson
- George Krauss
- Robert Wagoner

== 2004 ==
- Michael Baskes
- Ronald Gibala
- Tai-Gang Nieh
- John Perepezko
- Robert O. Ritchie

== 2005 ==
- Hamish Fraser
- Terence Langdon
- Alton Romig

== 2006 ==
- Diran Apelian
- Clyde Briant
- Doris Kuhlmann-Wilsdorf *

== 2007 ==
- William Boettinger
- Roger Doherty
- Armen Khachaturyan
- Stephen Pearton
- Erland Schulson

== 2008 ==
- Tsu-Wei Chou
- Campbell Laird
- David Laughlin
- S. Semiatin

== 2009 ==
- William Gerberich
- Douglas Granger
- Michael Miller
- Tresa Pollock
- Hong Yong Sohn

== 2010 ==
- Jeff DeHosson
- James Evans
- Easo George
- Richard Hoagland
- Philip Mackey

== 2011 ==
- David Bourell
- Kazuhiro Hono
- Marc A. Meyers
- Anthony Rollett
- Steven Zinkle

== 2012 ==
- Ian Baker
- David Dunand
- Sung Kang
- Pradeep Rohatgi

== 2013 ==
- George T. Gray III
- Robert Shull
- David Srolovitz
- Peter Voorhees

== 2014 ==
- John Allison
- Kevin Hemker
- Enrique Lavernia
- Michel Rappaz
- Ruslan Valiev

== 2015 ==
- Iver Anderson
- Surya Kalidindi
- David Matlock
- Michael Mills
- Christopher Schuh
- Barry Welch

== 2016 ==
- Brajendra Mishra
- G. Odette
- George Pharr
- Ian Robertson
- James Smialek
- Bruce Wessels

== 2017 ==
- Long-Qing Chen
- Ke Lu
- Gary Was
- Yuntian Zhu

== 2018 ==
- Gerbrand Ceder
- Brent Fultz
- Carol Handwerker
- Peter Liaw
- Daniel Miracle
- Ray Peterson

== 2019 ==
- Thomas Bieler
- M. Grace Burke
- Frank Crossley
- Dennis Dimiduk
- Roderick Guthrie
- Elizabeth A. Holm
- Nack Joon Kim
- Alan Taub
- Dan J. Thoma

== 2020 ==
- Mark Asta
- Rodney Boyer
- Marc De Graef
- Diana Farkas
- Dorte Juul Jensen
- Karl Kainer
- David McDowell
- Neville Moody

== 2021 ==
- Dipankar Banerjee
- Raymond Decker
- David DeYoung
- Fiona Doyle
- Somnath Ghosh
- Hani Henein
- Donald Sadoway
- Julie Schoenung
