= Irene Beyerlein =

American materials scientist

Irene Jane Beyerlein
- Born: 1971 (age 54–55)
- Education: Cornell University; Clemson University
- Scientific career
- Workplaces: University of California, Santa Barbara; Los Alamos National Laboratory
- Thesis: Failure of fibrous composites: Elastic and time-dependent stress analyses, Monte Carlo simulation, and probability modeling. (1997)
- Website: Beyerlein Lab

Irene Jane Beyerlein (born November 1971) is an American materials scientist who is the Mehrabian Interdisciplinary Endowed Chair at the University of California, Santa Barbara. She is a Fellow of the Materials Research Society. Beyerlein was elected a member of the US National Academy of Engineering in 2024 for contributions to methodologies predicting the mechanics of complex engineering materials to improve their stability and strength.

== Early life and education ==
Beyerlein was born in Clemson, South Carolina. She completed undergraduate studies at Clemson University. After her junior year she realized that she was interested mathematics and materials, and decided to major in mechanical engineering. She moved to Cornell University for graduate studies, where she studied fibrous composites. After earning her doctorate, Beyerlein joined the Los Alamos National Laboratory as a J. R. Oppenheimer Fellow. She spent three years as a research fellow before being appointed to the faculty at the LANL.

== Research and career ==
Beyerlein worked as a theorist at Los Alamos National Laboratory for several years, where she was co-director of the Energy Frontiers Research Center. In 2016, Beyerlein joined the University of California, Santa Barbara.

Beyerlein's research considers the design of materials that can withstand extreme conditions, including high stress, temperature and strain. She has studied how plastic deformations propagate through materials and how strain localization can give rise to the initiation of slip bands. She is particularly interested in how lightweight materials that can improve fuel economy in aircraft.

Beyerlein is the editor of Scripta Materialia and on the editorial board of Acta Materialia. In 2019, Beyerlein was recognized as a Brimacombe Medalist by The Minerals, Metals & Materials Society for her "groundbreaking work on the plasticity of HCP metals and metal nanocomposites as well as for her commitment to mentorship of the next generation of materials scientists."

To date, Beyerlein has published over 500 academic manuscripts, and has been cited over 30,000 times, resulting in an h-index and i10-index of 93 and 390 respectively.

== Awards and honors ==
- 2012 Los Alamos National Laboratory Fellows' Prize
- 2013 International Journal of Plasticity Young Research Award
- 2014 Distinguished Mentor Award
- 2016 NSF ADVANCE STEM Professor Fellowship
- 2018 The Minerals, Metals & Materials Society Distinguished Scientist/Engineering Award
- 2018 The Minerals, Metals & Materials Society Brimacombe Medalist
- 2019 AIME Champion H. Mathewson Award
- 2021 Elected Fellow of the Materials Research Society
- 2021 LMD Magnesium Technology Award - Best Poster

== Selected publications ==
- J.Y Huang; Y.T Zhu; X.Z Liao; I.J Beyerlein; M.A Bourke; T.E Mitchell (January 2003). "Microstructure of cryogenic treated M2 tool steel". Materials Science and Engineering A. 339 (1–2): 241–244. doi:10.1016/s0921-5093(02)00165-x. ISSN 0921-5093. Wikidata Q57944798.
- Beyerlein, I.J.; Tomé, C.N. (May 2008). "A dislocation-based constitutive law for pure Zr including temperature effects". International Journal of Plasticity. 24 (5): 867–895. doi:10.1016/j.ijplas.2007.07.017. ISSN 0749-6419.
- Beyerlein, Irene J.; Tth, Lszl S. (2009), "Texture Evolution in Equal-Channel Angular Extrusion", Bulk Nanostructured Materials, Weinheim, Germany: Wiley-VCH Verlag GmbH & Co. KGaA, pp. 387–421, doi:10.1002/9783527626892.ch18, ISBN 9783527626892
- Marcel Risse, Martin Lentz, Christoph Fahrenson, Walter Reimers, Marko Knezevic and Irene J. Beyerlein. Elevated Temperature Effects on the Plastic Anisotropy of an Extruded Mg-4 Wt Pct Li Alloy: Experiments and Polycrystal Modeling. Metallurgical and Materials Transactions A volume 48, pages 446–458 (2017). doi:https://doi.org/10.1007/s11661-016-3780-4

== Personal life ==
Beyerlein is a road cyclist, and was named Los Alamos, New Mexico State Cycling Champion in 2005 and 2010.
