= Hemker =

Hemker can refer to:

== Places ==
- Hemker Park and Zoo, a zoo in Freeport, Minnesota, U.S.
- Hemker, Missouri, U.S., an unincorporated community

== People ==
- Coen Hemker (born 1934), a Dutch biochemist and academic administrator
- Kevin Hemker, an American materials scientist
- Maria Oliva-Hemker, a Cuban-American pediatrician
