= First Light (2025 film) =

2025 drama film by James J. Robinson

- Australian theatrical release poster
- Directed by: James J. Robinson
- Written by: James J. Robinson
- Produced by: Gabrielle Pearson; Jane Pe Aguirre; Christelle Dychangco
- Starring: Ruby Ruiz; Kare Adea; Maricel Soriano; Emmanuel Santos; Rez Cortez; Soliman Cruz; Kidlat Tahimik; Lui Manansala
- Cinematography: Amy Dellar
- Edited by: Geri Docherty
- Music by: Ana Roxanne
- Production companies: Majella Productions; Good Thing Productions
- Distributed by: Bonsai Films
- Release dates: 10 August 2025 (Melbourne International Film Festival); 24 June 2026 (Philippines)
- Running time: 118 minutes
- Countries: Philippines; Australia
- Language: Filipino

First Light is a 2025 drama film written and directed by James J. Robinson, in his feature debut. A co-production of Philippines and Australia, it stars Ruby Ruiz, Kare Adea, Maricel Soriano, Emmanuel Santos, Rez Cortez, Soliman Cruz, and Kidlat Tahimik.

The film premiered in competition in the Bright Horizons section at the 2025 Melbourne International Film Festival, where Robinson won the Blackmagic Design Best Australian Director Award. It was also selected as the Australian entry for the Best International Feature Film at the 99th Academy Awards.

== Premise ==
Set in a decaying convent in the mountains of Luzon, the film follows Sister Yolanda, a middle-aged Catholic nun whose faith is shaken by a tragic accident. As pressure mounts from the Church and state to suppress the truth, she finds herself questioning the institution she has devoted her life to. The story explores themes of spiritual doubt, institutional corruption, and postcolonial trauma.

== Cast ==
- Ruby Ruiz as Sister Yolanda
- Kare Adea as Sister Arlene
- Maricel Soriano as Linda
- Emmanuel Santos as Cesar
- Rez Cortez as Edward
- Soliman Cruz as Father Claridad
- Kidlat Tahimik as Farmer
- Lui Manansala as Mother Angie

== Production ==
The film received development funding from Screen Australia in 2023, with additional production financing from VicScreen, the Film Development Council of the Philippines, Clou Media Productions, and the Melbourne International Film Festival Premiere Fund. Principal photography took place on location in the Philippines in May 2024.

The film marked James J. Robinson’s transition from photography to feature filmmaking. Robinson has stated that the project was a way of reconnecting with his Filipino and Australian heritage and re-examining his Catholic upbringing. Much of the cast and crew were based in the Philippines, and Robinson noted that working in the country allowed him to engage with family histories and spiritual practices that influenced the film’s perspective.

During production, Robinson reported that an exorcism took place on set, reflecting the religious context in which the film was made. Ruby Ruiz described her role as demanding significant emotional intensity, while Kare Adea recalled that Robinson emphasised silence and physical expression during performance. Robinson later described the filmmaking process as “a really beautiful” merging of his Australian and Filipino cultural backgrounds.

== Release ==
First Light premiered in August 2025 at the Melbourne International Film Festival, screening in competition in the Bright Horizons section against films including Sound of Falling, Renoir and Urchin. Director James J. Robinson was awarded with the Blackmagic Design Best Australian Director award for the film, taking out a $50,000 cash prize. The film had its international premiere at the 22nd edition of the Marrakech International Film Festival, where it screened in main competition and was nominated for the Étoile d'Or. It was followed by screenings in 2026 at International Film Festival Rotterdam, Shanghai International Film Festival, Glasgow Film Festival, New Zealand International Film Festival, Miami Film Festival and Lima Alterna Film Festival.

The film was the GIO Audience Award runner up for Best Australian Feature at the Sydney Film Festival in 2026.

The film was released in Philippine cinemas on June 24 and Australian cinemas on July 9. The film's sales are represented by Independent Entertainment.

== Reception ==
After its world premiere, First Light received positive critical response. On review aggregator Rotten Tomatoes, the film holds an approval rating of 83% based on 12 reviews, with an average rating of 7.6/10.

The Curb's Andy Hazel described it as “an astonishing debut feature,” praising James J. Robinson’s assured direction and the film’s “painterly, evocative” visuals that "firmly announce a major new voice in Australian and Southeast Asian cinema" Screen International's Allan Hunter similarly described the film as an "assured, precisely crafted debut", noting that the "philosophical heft is matched by the gentle, understated humanity of Ruby Ruiz," drawing parallels to Lucrecia Martel and Powell & Pressburger. The Australian's Nikki Gemmell called the film a "profound and haunting masterwork from an exciting new voice in Australian cinema."

=== Accolades ===
Award / Festival	Date of ceremony	Category	Recipient(s)	Result	Ref.
Melbourne International Film Festival	23 August 2025	Bright Horizons Award	James J. Robinson	Nominated	
Melbourne International Film Festival	23 August 2025	Best Australian Director	James J. Robinson	Won	
Marrakech International Film Festival	6 December 2025	Étoile d'Or	First Light	Nominated	
Glasgow Film Festival	4 March 2026	Audience Award	First Light	Nominated	
Sydney Film Festival	17 June 2026	Best Australian Feature	First Light	Runner-up	

== See also ==
- List of submissions to the 99th Academy Awards for Best International Feature Film
- List of Australian submissions for the Academy Award for Best International Feature Film
