= The Minerals, Metals & Materials Society =

US-based professional organization

- Founded: 1957
- Type: Professional Society
- Legal status: 501(c)(3) Tax-exempt Organization
- Purpose: Minerals, Metals, and Materials Science and Engineering
- Location: Pittsburgh, Pennsylvania
- Origins: Member society of AIME
- Region served: Worldwide
- Method: Conferences, Publications, Courses
- Members: 13,000
- President: Viola Acoff
- Key people: Trudi Dunlap (Executive Director and CEO),
- Revenue: $7M+
- Employees: 30
- Website: www.tms.org

The Minerals, Metals & Materials Society (TMS) is a professional organization for materials scientists and engineers that encompasses the entire range of materials and engineering, from minerals processing and primary metals production to basic research and the advanced applications of materials.

The society's functions include providing forums for the exchange of information; encouraging technology transfer; promoting the education and development of professionals and students; representing the profession in the accreditation of educational programs and in the registration of professional engineers (a U.S.-grounded activity); encouraging professionalism, ethical behavior, and concern for the environment; and stimulating a worldwide sense of unity in the profession.

TMS is headquartered in Pittsburgh, United States, but is international in scope. Included among its approximately 13,000 professional and student members are metallurgical and materials engineers, scientists, researchers, educators, and administrators from more than 70 countries on six continents. It uses a volunteer driven structure with members serving at all levels of the society including shaping the policy, programming, and publications of the society.

== Technical divisions ==
The society comprises five technical divisions to program conferences, develop content for publications, and perform other activities:

- Extraction & Processing Division
- Functional Materials Division
- Light Metals Division
- Materials Processing & Manufacturing Division
- Structural Materials Division

== Publications ==
TMS is a major publisher in the materials community. The society publishes seven internationally respected technical journals, as well as multiple influential roadmapping studies and reports. In addition, each year the society publishes numerous proceedings volumes containing papers presented at society-sponsored meetings.

=== Journals ===
- JOM, a monthly journal devoted to exploring the complete range of minerals, metals, and materials science and engineering.
- Journal of Electronic Materials, which prints peer-reviewed technical articles each month on advances in electronics materials.
- Metallurgical and Materials Transactions, which comprises two peer-reviewed archival journals. Volume A, published monthly, covers physical metallurgy and materials science, and Volume B, published bi-monthly, covers process metallurgy and materials processing science.
- Journal of Sustainable Metallurgy, a quarterly journal which explores metallurgical processes and related innovations in improving the sustainability of metal-producing industries.
- Integrating Materials and Manufacturing Innovation, which explores innovations in materials which support Integrated Computational Materials Engineering (ICME).

=== Studies ===
TMS has developed influential technology and/or roadmapping studies and reports convening experts in the minerals, metals, and materials communities. These publications are made freely accessible to the public.

- Advanced Materials for Stationary Electrical Energy Storage, which includes a technical roadmap of the highest impact areas of research and development in the field, and the report, "Electric Power Industry Needs for Grid-Scale Storage."
- Linking Transformational Materials and Processing for an Energy-Efficient and Low-Carbon Economy, a three-part study on into areas where new materials and processing breakthroughs can create substantial advancements in carbon emission reduction, energy efficiency, and energy security.
- Implementing Integrated Computational Materials Engineering (ICME) in the Aerospace, Automotive, and Maritime Industries, which compiles the expertise of nearly 50 technical leaders in ICME and its allied fields to offer practical guidance for implementing an ICME-accelerated product development program within three years.
- Diversity in the Minerals, Metals, and Materials Professions (DMMM1), which offers insights into and highlights common themes across issues related to diversity and inclusion in the workplace.
- Modeling Across Scales, a roadmapping study which offers practical guidance in for connecting materials models across length and time scales.
- Building a Materials Data Infrastructure, which explores the barriers related to data storage and data sharing and offers recommendations to overcoming them.
- Harnessing Materials Innovations to Support Next Generation Manufacturing Technologies, documenting the results of a workshop forecasting key technological breakthroughs supporting the next wave of U.S. manufacturing.
- Advanced Computation and Data in Materials and Manufacturing: Core Knowledge Gaps and Opportunities, which focuses on determining the gaps in core knowledge that, if fulfilled, would enable transformative science and engineering breakthroughs within the materials and manufacturing arenas.
- Verification & Validation of Computational Models Associated with the Mechanics of Materials, which charts a course for widespread adoption of robust V&V among computational modelers and experimentalists in mechanics and materials science and engineering.
- Metamorphic Manufacturing: Shaping the Future of On-Demand Components, which provides insight to jump-start a potentially disruptive technology which combines the incremental deformation of a metalsmith with the precision and control of intelligent machines and robotic systems.
- Creating the Next-Generation Materials Genome Initiative Workforce offers a series of action plans and recommendations that address the education and training goals outlined in the 2014 strategic plan of the Materials Genome Initiative (MGI).
- Accelerating the Broad Implementation of Verification & Validation in Computational Models of the Mechanics of Materials and Structures outlines recommended practices, and provides detailed action plans that are designed to support the progress of verification and validation in the mechanics of materials and structures.

== Board of directors ==
TMS Board of Directors
year	President	Vice President	Past President	Financial Planning Officer	Extraction & Processing Division	Functional Materials Division	Materials Processing & Manufacturing Division	Structural Materials Division	Light Metals Division	Professional Development	Content Development & Dissemination	Membership & Student Development	Programming	Public & Governmental Affairs	Executive Director
2025-2026	Daniel Miracle	Viola Acoff	Srinivas Chada	Alexis Lewis	Elsa Olivetti	Saryu Fensin	Carelyn Campbell	Clarissa Yablinsky	Randy Beals	Kester Clarke	Jonathan Madison	Jenifer Locke	Robert Maaß	Michael Titus	James J. Robinson
2024-2025	Srinivas Chada	Daniel Miracle	Brad Boyce	Alexis Lewis	Elsa Olivetti	Saryu Fensin	Paul Mason	Suveen Mathaudhu	Edward Williams	Kester Clarke	Jonathan Madison	Viola Acoff	Robert Maaß	Michael Titus	James J. Robinson
2023-2024	Brad Boyce	Srinivas Chada	W. Jud Ready	Alexis Lewis	Elsa Olivetti	Saryu Fensin	Paul Mason	Suveen Mathaudhu	Edward Williams	Kester Clarke	Jonathan Madison	Viola Acoff	Timothy Rupert	Michael Titus	James J. Robinson
2022-2023	W. Jud Ready	Brad Boyce	Ellen Cerreta	Charles Ward	Christina Meskers	Paul Ohodnicki	Paul Mason	Suveen Mathaudhu	Edward Williams	David Bourell	Judy Schneider	Viola Acoff	Timothy Rupert	Eric N. Brown	James J. Robinson
2021-2022	Ellen Cerreta	W. Jud Ready	Thomas Battle	Charles Ward	Christina Meskers	Paul Ohodnicki	Mark R. Stoudt	Daniel Miracle	Eric Nyberg	David Bourell	Judy Schneider	Alexis Lewis	Timothy Rupert	Eric N. Brown	James J. Robinson
2020-2021	Thomas Battle	Ellen Cerreta	James C. Foley	Charles Ward	Christina Meskers	Paul Ohodnicki	Mark R. Stoudt	Daniel Miracle	Eric Nyberg	David Bourell	Judy Schneider	Alexis Lewis	Brad Boyce	Eric N. Brown	James J. Robinson
2019-2020	James C. Foley	Thomas Battle	Kevin Hemker	Adrian Deneys	Cynthia K. Belt	Raymundo Arróyave	Mark R. Stoudt	Daniel Miracle	Eric Nyberg	Chester J. Van Tyne	Michele V. Manuel	Alexis Lewis	Brad Boyce	John A. Howarter	James J. Robinson
2018-2019	Kevin Hemker	James C. Foley	David DeYoung	Adrian Deneys	Cynthia K. Belt	Raymundo Arróyave	Corbett Battaile	Ellen Cerreta	Alan Luo	Chester J. Van Tyne	Michele V. Manuel	Amy Clarke	Brad Boyce	John A. Howarter	James J. Robinson
2017-2018	David DeYoung	Kevin Hemker	Stanley M. Howard	Joy H. Forsmark	Cynthia K. Belt	Raymundo Arróyave	Corbett Battaile	Ellen Cerreta	Alan Luo	Chester J. Van Tyne	Michele V. Manuel	Amy Clarke	Srinivas Chada	John A. Howarter	James J. Robinson
2016-2017	Stanley M. Howard	David DeYoung	Patrice E. A. Turchi	Joy H. Forsmark	Mark E. Schlesinger	Roger Narayan	Corbett Battaile	Ellen Cerreta	Alan Luo	Jeffrey Fergus	Eric N. Brown	Amy Clarke	Srinivas Chada	Edward D. Herderick	James J. Robinson
2015-2016	Patrice E. A. Turchi	Stanley M. Howard	Hani Henein	Joy H. Forsmark	Mark E. Schlesinger	Roger Narayan	James C. Foley	Rajiv S. Mishra	David H. DeYoung	Jeffrey Fergus	Eric N. Brown	Amy Clarke	Srinivas Chada	Edward D. Herderick	James J. Robinson
2014-2015	Hani Henein	Patrice E. A. Turchi	Elizabeth A. Holm	Robert Hyers	Mark E. Schlesinger	Roger Narayan	James C. Foley	Rajiv S. Mishra	David H. DeYoung	Jeffrey Fergus	Eric N. Brown	David Bahr	Neville Moody	Edward D. Herderick	James J. Robinson

TMS Board of Directors: Before "Electronic, Magnetic & Photonic Materials Division" renamed "Functional Materials Division"
year	President	Vice President	Past President	Financial Planning Officer	Extraction & Processing Division	Electronic, Magnetic & Photonic Materials Division	Materials Processing & Manufacturing Division	Structural Materials Division	Light Metals Division	Professional Development	Content Development & Dissemination	Membership & Student Development	Programing	Public & Governmental Affairs	Executive Director
2013-2014	Elizabeth A. Holm	Hani Henein	Wolfgang A. Schneider	Robert Hyers	Adrian Deneys	Srinivas Chada	James C. Foley	Rajiv S. Mishra	David H. DeYoung	David A. Shifler	W. Jud Ready & Carl Cady	David Bahr	Neville Moody	Edward D. Herderick	James J. Robinson
2012-2013	Wolfgang A. Schneider	Elizabeth A. Holm	Garry W. Warren	Robert Hyers	Adrian Deneys	Srinivas Chada	James W. Sears	Dennis M. Dimiduk	John Hryn	David A. Shifler	W. Jud Ready & Carl Cady	David Bahr	Neville Moody	Kevin Hemker	Warren H. Hunt, Jr
2011-2012	Garry W. Warren	Wolfgang A. Schneider	George T. 'Rusty' Gray III	Stanley M. Howard	Adrian Deneys	Srinivas Chada	James W. Sears	Dennis M. Dimiduk	John Hryn	David A. Shifler	W. Jud Ready & Carl Cady	Ellen Cerreta	Hani Henein	Kevin Hemker	Warren H. Hunt, Jr

TMS Board of Directors: Before "Information Technology" and "Publications" Committees combined into "Content Development & Dissemination"
year	President	Vice President	Past President	Financial Planning Officer	Extraction & Processing Division	Electronic, Magnetic & Photonic Materials Division	Materials Processing & Manufacturing Division	Structural Materials Division	Light Metals Division	Professional Development	Information Technology	Publications	Membership & Student Development	Programing	Public & Governmental Affairs	Executive Director
2010-2011	George T. 'Rusty' Gray III	Garry W. Warren	Ray D. Peterson	Stanley M. Howard	Thomas Battle	Zi-Kui Liu	James W. Sears	Dennis M. Dimiduk	John Hryn	David A. Shifler	Nikhilesh Chawla	Elizabeth A. Holm	Ellen Cerreta	Hani Henein	Kevin Hemker	Warren H. Hunt, Jr
2009-2010	Ray D. Peterson	George T. 'Rusty' Gray III	Diran Apelian	Stanley M. Howard	Thomas Battle	Zi-Kui Liu	Joy Forsmark	Eric M. Taleff	Wolfgang A. Schneider	David A. Shifler	Nikhilesh Chawla	Elizabeth A. Holm	Ellen Cerreta	Hani Henein	Kevin Hemker	Warren H. Hunt, Jr
2008-2009	Diran Apelian	Ray D. Peterson	Robert D. Shull	Garry W. Warren	Thomas Battle	Zi-Kui Liu	Joy Forsmark	Eric M. Taleff	Wolfgang A. Schneider	David A. Shifler	Nikhilesh Chawla	Elizabeth A. Holm	W. Jud Ready	James C. Foley	Kevin Hemker	Alexander Scott
2007-2008	Robert D. Shull	Diran Apelian	Brajendra Mishra	Garry W. Warren	Robert L. Stephens	Patrice E. A. Turchi	Joy A. Hines (now Forsmark)	Eric M. Taleff	Wolfgang A. Schneider	Anthony A. Pengidore	Marc J. DeGraef	George T. Gray III	W. Jud Ready	James C. Foley	Iver E. Anderson	Alexander Scott
2006-2007	Brajendra Mishra	Robert D. Shull	Tresa M. Pollock	Garry W. Warren	Robert L. Stephens	Patrice E. A. Turchi	John Smugeresky	Elizabeth A. Holm	Ray D. Peterson	Anthony A. Pengidore	Marc J. DeGraef	George T. Gray III	W. Jud Ready	James C. Foley	Iver E. Anderson	Alexander Scott

TMS Board of Directors: Before "Student Affairs" and "Membership Development" Committees combined into "Membership & Student Development"
year	President	Vice President	Past President	Financial Planning Officer	Extraction & Processing Division	Electronic, Magnetic & Photonic Materials Division	Materials Processing & Manufacturing Division	Structural Materials Division	Light Metals Division	Professional Development	Information Technology	Publications	Student Affairs	Membership Development	Programing	Public & Governmental Affairs	Executive Director
2005-2006	Tresa M. Pollock	Brajendra Mishra	Gregory J. Hildeman	John Parsey	Robert L. Stephens	Patrice E. A. Turchi	John Smugeresky	Elizabeth A. Holm	Ray Peterson	Anthony A. Pengidore	Marc J. DeGraef	George T. Gray III	Walter W. Milligan	Wolfgang Schneider	Richard Wright	Iver E. Anderson	Alexander Scott

TMS Board of Directors: Before "Professional Registration" and "Education" Committees combined into "Professional Development"
year	President	Vice President	Past President	Financial Planning Officer	Extraction & Processing Division	Electronic, Magnetic & Photonic Materials Division	Materials Processing & Manufacturing Division	Structural Materials Division	Light Metals Division	Professional Development	Education	Information Technology	Publications	Student Affairs	Membership Development	Programing	Public & Governmental Affairs	Executive Director
2004-2005	Gregory J. Hildeman	Tresa M. Pollock	Dan J. Thoma	John Parsey	Brajendra Mishra	Sungho Jin	John Smugeresky	Elizabeth A. Holm	Ray Peterson	Wayne Reitz	Dennis Readey	Marc J. DeGraef	Dallis Hardwick	Walter W. Milligan	Wolfgang Schneider	Richard Wright	Warren Hunt	Alexander Scott
2003-2004	Dan J. Thoma	Gregory J. Hildeman	John E. Allison	John Parsey	Brajendra Mishra	Sungho Jin	John Smugeresky	Tresa M. Pollock	Subodh Das	Wayne Reitz	Dennis Readey	Marc J. DeGraef	Dallis Hardwick	Walter W. Milligan	Wolfgang Schneider	Richard Wright	Warren Hunt	Alexander Scott
2002-2003	John E. Allison	Dan J. Thoma	Wayne R. Hale	Gregory J. Hildeman	Brajendra Mishra	Sungho Jin	John Smugeresky	George T. Gray III	Subodh Das	Wayne Reitz	Dennis Readey	Marc J. DeGraef	Dallis Hardwick	Walter W. Milligan	Darrel Frear	Richard Wright	Warren Hunt	Alexander Scott

== See also ==
- List of Fellows of The Minerals, Metals & Materials Society
