= Bhakta B. Rath =

Indian American physicist

- Born: Banki, Odisha, India
- Occupations: Material physicist Writer
- Years active: Since 1961
- Known for: United States Naval Research Laboratory service
- Spouse: Sushama
- Awards: Padma Bhushan; Michigan Tech Distinguished Alumni Award; Acta Materialia J. Herbert Hollomon Award; DOD Distinguished Civilian Service Award; Fred Saalfeld Award; Presidential Rank Award for Distinguished Executive; NRL Lifetime Achievement Award; National Materials Advancement Award; Presidential Rank Award of Meritorious Executive Award; S. Chandrasekhar Award; George Kimball Burgess Memorial Award; Charles S. Barrett Medal; The Minerals, Metals & Materials Society Leadership Award

Bhakta B. Rath is an Indian American material physicist and head of the Materials Science and Component Technology of the United States Naval Research Laboratory (NRL), the corporate research laboratory for the United States Navy and the United States Marine Corps. He is the chief administrative officer for program planning, interdisciplinary coordination, supervision and control of research and is the associate director of research for Materials Science and Component Technology at NRL.

He was elected a member of the National Academy of Engineering in 2008 for leadership in advancing materials research and technology to support national security. Rath is also an elected fellow of The Minerals, Metals and Materials Society, ASM International, Washington Academy of Sciences, Materials Research Society of India, the American Association for the Advancement of Science (AAAS) and the Institute of Materials, Minerals and Mining, UK and a recipient of several awards and honors including Presidential Rank Award three times. The Government of India awarded him the third highest civilian honour of the Padma Bhushan, in 2009, for his contributions to science and technology.

== Biography ==
Born in Banki, in the Indian state of Odisha, Rath graduated in Physics and Mathematics from Utkal University in 1955 and shifting his base to the US, he followed it up with a master's degree (MS) from Michigan Technological University in 1958 after which he secured his doctoral degree (PhD) from Illinois Institute of Technology in 1961. His career started as an assistant professor of Metallurgy and Material Science at the Washington State University in 1961. Subsequent to his stay at the university till 1965, he moved to the United States Steel Corporation at their Edgar C. Bain Laboratory for Fundamental Research where he worked till 1972, when he was appointed as the head of the Metal Physics Research Group of the McDonnell Douglas Research Laboratories, Missouri. Concurrently, he also served Carnegie Mellon University, the University of Maryland, and the Colorado School of Mines as their adjunct professor. In 1976, he joined the Naval Research Laboratory as the head of the Physical Metallurgy Division where he rose in ranks to become the superintendent of the Materials Science and Technology Division in 1982 and the head of the Materials Science and Component Technology Directorate in 1986, a post he holds to date. He also served on the Engineering and Computer Science jury for the Infosys Prize in 2016 and 2017.

Rath is a member of the Advisory Boards of several organizations and agencies such as US Navy, US Department of Defense, National Research Council, National Academy of Engineering, National Academy of Sciences and National Science Foundation, and educational institutions including Carnegie-Mellon University, University of Virginia, Colorado School of Mines, University of Maryland, University of Connecticut, Florida Atlantic University, Lehigh University, Illinois Institute of Technology, University of Wisconsin–Milwaukee and the University of Florida. In India, he is a former chairman of the Technology Advisory Board of the International Advanced Research Centre for Powder Metallurgy and New Materials (ARCI), Hyderabad, an advisor to the Indian Institute of Minerals and Materials Technology, Bhubaneswar and a distinguished visiting professor at the Indian Institute of Technology, Bhubaneswar. He sits in the planning committee on methane hydrates of the Department of Energy of the Government of India as well as the Indo-US Joint Commission on Science and Technology as the representative of US Navy. He has also represented the US Navy at The Technical Cooperation Program (TTCP) countries such as UK, Australia, Canada and New Zealand.

Rath, who is married to Sushama, has published several articles and scientific papers, co-authored a text, Textbook of Nanoscience and Nanotechnology and has contributed chapters to books written by others. He served as the president of the ASM International the Materials Information Society in 2004–2005. He has also been associated with organizations such as Education Foundation, the Federation of Materials Society and The Minerals, Metals & Materials Society as a member of the board of trustees and has been a member of the editorial boards of three global research journals on material physics.

== Awards and honors ==
Rath, a Michigan Tech Alumni Association Distinguished Alumni Award winner, received three Presidential Rank Awards, in 1999, 2004 and 2005. He received the George Kimball Burgess Memorial Award in 1991 and ASM Distinguished Life Membership Award as well as the National Materials Advancement Award from the Federation of Materials Societies in 2001. The United States Naval Research Laboratory awarded him their Lifetime Achievement Award in 2004 and the next year, he received the Fred Saalfeld Award for Outstanding Lifetime Achievement in Science. He was awarded the Acta Materialia J. Herbert Hollomon Award and the Illinois Institute of Technology Mechanical Materials & Aerospace Engineering Department Alumni Recognition Award in 2008 and the Government of India included him in the Republic Day Honors list in 2009, for the civilian award of the Padma Bhushan. In 2015, his alma mater, the Illinois Institute of Technology awarded him the Alumni Award for Professional Achievement. He is also a recipient of S. Chandrasekhar Award, Charles S. Barrett Medal and the Minerals, Metals and Materials Society Leadership Award and several other Oration awards.

Rath is an elected fellow of such scientific societies as Indian National Academy of Engineering, The Minerals, Metals and Materials Society, ASM International the Materials Information Society, Washington Academy of Sciences, Materials Research Society of India, American Association for the Advancement of Science (AAAS) and the Institute of Materials, UK. He is a member of the National Academy of Engineering, and an honorary member of the Indian Institute of Metals. Michigan Technological University conferred an honorary doctorate on him in 2007 and he received the degree of Doctor of Science from Ravenshaw University in 2010. Two years later, the Indian Institute of Technology, Bhubaneswar awarded him their first honoris causa doctorate. One of the departmental libraries at Colorado School of Mines has been named after him, post his donation of a number of rare technical books to the school and Michigan Technological University has instituted an annual award, Bhakta B. Rath Research Award, which is awarded to the best doctoral thesis in science and engineering.

== See also ==
- United States Naval Research Laboratory
