= Ellen Cerreta =

American materials scientist

Ellen Kathleen Cerreta
- Education: Carnegie Mellon University (PhD) University of Virginia (B.S.)
- Scientific career
- Fields: Materials science Microstructure; Strength of materials
- Workplaces: Los Alamos National Laboratory
- Thesis: Substructural Evolution of Creep Deformed Titanium Aluminides (2001)
- Doctoral advisor: Tresa Pollock and Subhash Mahajan
- Website: www.lanl.gov/engage/organizations/physical-sciences/materials-science-technology

Ellen K. Cerreta is a materials scientist at Los Alamos National Laboratory, working to provide materials science and technology solutions for national security missions. She is Fellow of ASM International.

Cerreta is internationally recognized for her research on the relationship between microstructure and dynamic materials properties.

== Education ==
Cerreta received her B.S. degree in aerospace engineering from the University of Virginia in 1996. She moved to Carnegie Mellon University for her M.S. and Ph.D. degrees in materials science and engineering in 1997 and 2001 respectively. For her doctoral studies, she worked with Tresa Pollock and Subhash Mahajan on Substructural Evolution of Creep Deformed Titanium Aluminides. She performed some of her graduate research as a visiting scientist in the Center for High Resolution Microscopy (CHREM) at Arizona State University.

== Research and career ==
Cerreta joined Los Alamos National Laboratory in 2001 as a Postdoctoral Fellow and then Technical Staff Member in 2003 in the Structure/Properties Relations Group (MST-8). At Los Alamos as a Technical Staff Member and Scientist, she has led a number of projects to investigate dynamic materials performance and provide insight toward advanced predictive capabilities for strength and damage in extreme environments. Cerrera's work has made major achievements on elucidating microstructural and substructural evolution mechanisms for dynamic mechanical properties and damage processes in metals. She has demonstrated sustained excellence and achievement in science related to materials science and engineering, both through her work in the open literature and through contribution to our national security. She has an H-index of 34. She was the Deputy Group Leader for MST-8 from 2013 to 2015, Group Leader of MST-8 from 2015 to 2017, Deputy Division Leader for Explosive Science and Shock Physics (M-Division), and Division Leader for Materials Science and Technology (MST-Division) since 2019. She has been an adjunct faculty member in The Institute of Shock Physics at Washington State University since 2012. She was a Trustee of ASM International from 2015 to 2018. She was an Associate Technical Editor of the Journal of Dynamic Behavior of Materials. She is the 2021-2022 President of the Minerals, Metals & Materials Society (TMS), and she has been on the organization's board of directors as the Director for Membership Development and Structural Materials Division and a member of various committees since joining TMS in 1997.

Ellen Cerreta serves as the associate Laboratory director for Physical Sciences at Los Alamos National Laboratory (2022 - present). She is responsible for overseeing the development and application of a broad set of capabilities in materials science and experimental physics to programs and problems of national importance, including through the stewardship and advancement of the Los Alamos Neutron Science Center (LANSCE) and the Sigma Complex. In 2024 and 2025, Cerreta led teams conducting forefront research in areas spanning advanced polymers, low-enriched fuel fabrication, isotope production, prototype-fabrication, materials used in high-energy explosives, additive manufacturing/3D printing, components for pit production, and more.

== Awards and recognition ==
- 2004 TMS SMD Young Leaders Professional Development
- 2007 TMS Young Leaders International Scholar - Japan Institute of Metals
- 2007 Alexander von Humboldt Foundation/National Academy of Engineers Sponsored, German-American Frontiers of Engineering
- 2013 TMS Brimacombe Medalist
- 2016 ASM International Fellow
- 2020 TMS SMD Distinguished Service Award
