= Jeff Th. M. DeHosson =

- Occupation: Materials scientist

Academic background
- Education: Candidate Degree, Mathematics and Physical Sciences; M.Sc., Theoretical Physics and Chemical Physics; Ph.D., Physics
- Alma mater: University of Utrecht; University of Groningen

Academic work
- Institutions: University of Groningen

Jeff Th. M. DeHosson is a materials scientist. He is a professor of Applied Physics at the Zernike Institute of Advanced Materials, University of Groningen, the Netherlands.

DeHosson's research focuses on the physics of materials, electron microscopy, and nanostructured materials. He was awarded the Knight of the Order of the Netherlands Lion and received the Eminent Scientist Medal from the Wessex Institute of Technology. He is also a fellow of the American Society for Metals and The Minerals, Metals & Materials Society, as well as an elected member of Academia Europaea and the Royal Netherlands Academy of Arts and Sciences.

== Education ==
DeHosson completed his candidate degree in Mathematics and Physical Sciences from the University of Utrecht in 1971. Later, in 1973, he earned his master's degree in Theoretical Physics and Chemical Physics from the same university. He completed his Ph.D. in Physics from the University of Groningen in 1976, with thesis supervisor André Wegener Sleeswijk.

== Career ==
DeHosson was appointed professor of Applied Physics at the University of Groningen by Royal Decree in 1977, a position he continues to hold. Between 1985 and 2015, he assumed the role of central departmental chair in Applied Physics, and also worked as chairman of the Executive Board of the Materials Science Centre of the University of Groningen. Additionally, he was a guest professor at Tsinghua University and the University of Science and Technology in China, as well as at Nelson Mandela Metropolitan University in South Africa.

DeHosson was an executive board member and founding member of the Netherlands Institute for Metals Research from 1997 to 2007. He was also an editor for the Acta Materialia Journals, Acta & Scripta Materialia from 1984 to 2026, as well as the Book Series from 2022 to 2028.

== Research ==
DeHosson's research focuses on advanced materials science, with emphasis on understanding how internal imperfections and defects influence the behavior and performance of materials. He investigated how materials responded to stress, deformation, and external forces by examining their structural features at different length scales that affected their behavior.

An aspect of DeHosson's research is the dynamics of defects, including the dislocation storage in ultrafine and nanograined materials, which governs their mechanical behavior. He also showed that at micro- and nano-scales, plastic deformation was governed by unstable, discrete defect-driven events, leading to intermittent strain bursts rather than smooth, continuous flow.

DeHosson also contributed to the study of nanostructured materials, demonstrating that materials with high specific surface area were suitable for applications such as sensors and electrochemical actuators. In his book Metals as Clean Fuels, he extended his research to energy-related applications, including hydrogen storage and the concept of nanostructured metals as scalable, CO₂-free fuels. Moreover, he highlighted how processing parameters influenced both structure, such as nano-phases, and properties, including hardness and residual stress, as well as how structural features like porosity and coatings affected functional properties such as adhesion.

== Awards and honors ==
- 2001 – Member, Royal Netherlands Academy of Arts and Sciences
- 2002 – Fellow, American Society of Metals
- 2005 – European Materials Gold Medal, Federation of European Materials Societies
- 2005 – Eminent Scientist Medal, Wessex Institute of Technology
- 2009 – NANOSMAT Prize, NANOSMAT
- 2010 – Fellow, The Minerals, Metals & Materials Society (TMS)
- 2016 – Elected member, Academia Europaea
- 2018 – Distinguished Scientist Award, THERMEC International Conference
- 2019 – Knight of the Order of the Netherlands Lion, Kingdom of the Netherlands

== Bibliography ==
=== Books ===
- Th.M. DeHosson, Jeff (2019). Put the Pedal to the Metal. Groningen University Press. pp. 1–612. ISBN 978-94-034-1349-5.
- Detsi, Eric; DeHosson, Jeff Th M. (2025). Metals as Clean Fuels. Amsterdam: Elsevier. ISBN 978-0-443-13537-8.

== Selected articles ==
- DeHosson, J. Th. M.; Kanert, O.; Sleeswijk, A. W. (1983). "Dislocations in solids investigated by means of nuclear magnetic resonance". Dislocations in Solids. 6: 442–534.
- Michelsen, K.; De Raedt, H.; DeHosson, J.Th.M. (2003). "Aspects of mathematical morphology". Advances in Imaging and Electron Physics. 125: 119–194. doi:10.1016/S1076-5670(02)80016-7. hdl:11370/14ab6ec7-06be-4753-a569-6a5f2f3047d7.
- Greer, Julia R.; DeHosson, Jeff Th. M. (2011). "Plasticity in small-sized metallic systems: Intrinsic versus extrinsic size effect". Progress in Materials Science. 56 (6): 654–724. doi:10.1016/j.pmatsci.2011.01.005. hdl:11370/29b92ebf-28a7-454c-9328-4418c65d2d22.
- De Hosson, J. Th. M. (2012). "In-situ Transmission Electron Microscopy on Metals". Handbook of Nanoscopy. Wiley: 1099–1151. doi:10.1002/9783527641864.ch30.
- Martínez-Martínez, D.; DeHosson, J.Th.M. (2014). "On the deposition and properties of DLC protective coatings on elastomers: a critical review". Surface and Coatings Technology. 258: 677–690. doi:10.1016/j.surfcoat.2014.08.016.
- Faber, E.T.; Martinez-Martinez, D.; Mansilla, C.; Ocelík, V.; DeHosson, J.Th.M. (2015). "Calibration-free quantitative surface topography reconstruction in scanning electron microscopy". Ultramicroscopy. 148: 31–41. doi:10.1016/j.ultramic.2014.08.009. hdl:11370/98c0e3d5-8a73-4748-8bbc-d84f2bb3bb74.
- Detsi, E.; Tolbert, S. H.; Punzhin, S.; DeHosson, J. Th. M. (2016). "Metallic muscles and beyond: nanofoams at work". Journal of Materials Science. 51: 615–634. doi:10.1007/s10853-015-9317-1. hdl:11370/e294a8ad-f737-4fcf-8c54-385bf0eba450.
- Rao, J.C.; Diao, H.Y.; Ocelík, V.; Vainchtein, D.; Zhang, C.; Kuo, C.; Tang, Z.; Guo, W.; Poplawsky, J.D.; Zhou, Y.; Liaw, P.K.; De Hosson, J. Th. M. (2017). "Secondary phases in AlxCoCrFeNi high-entropy alloys: An in-situ TEM heating study and thermodynamic appraisal". Acta Materialia. 131: 206–220. doi:10.1016/j.actamat.2017.03.066. hdl:11370/e821456c-f8cc-4616-9a68-d60c2a83cabf.
- Fu, Jintao; Detsi, Eric; DeHosson, Jeff Th.M. (2018). "Recent advances in nanoporous materials for renewable energy resources conversion into fuels". Surface & Coatings Technology. 347: 320–336. doi:10.1016/j.surfcoat.2018.05.001. hdl:11370/c7a7b5c2-8936-4124-87b9-15c3fc9628a0.
- Fidder, Herman; Basu, Indranil; DeHosson, Jeff Th.M. (2023). "Twinning induced spatial stress gradients: Local versus global stress states in hexagonal close-packed materials". Acta Materialia. 256: 119142–119159. doi:10.1016/j.actamat.2023.119142. hdl:11370/3adfbbb8-af74-4c5c-bc00-8daf90dd37c0.
