= Ashley Gilbertson =

Australian photographer (born 1978)

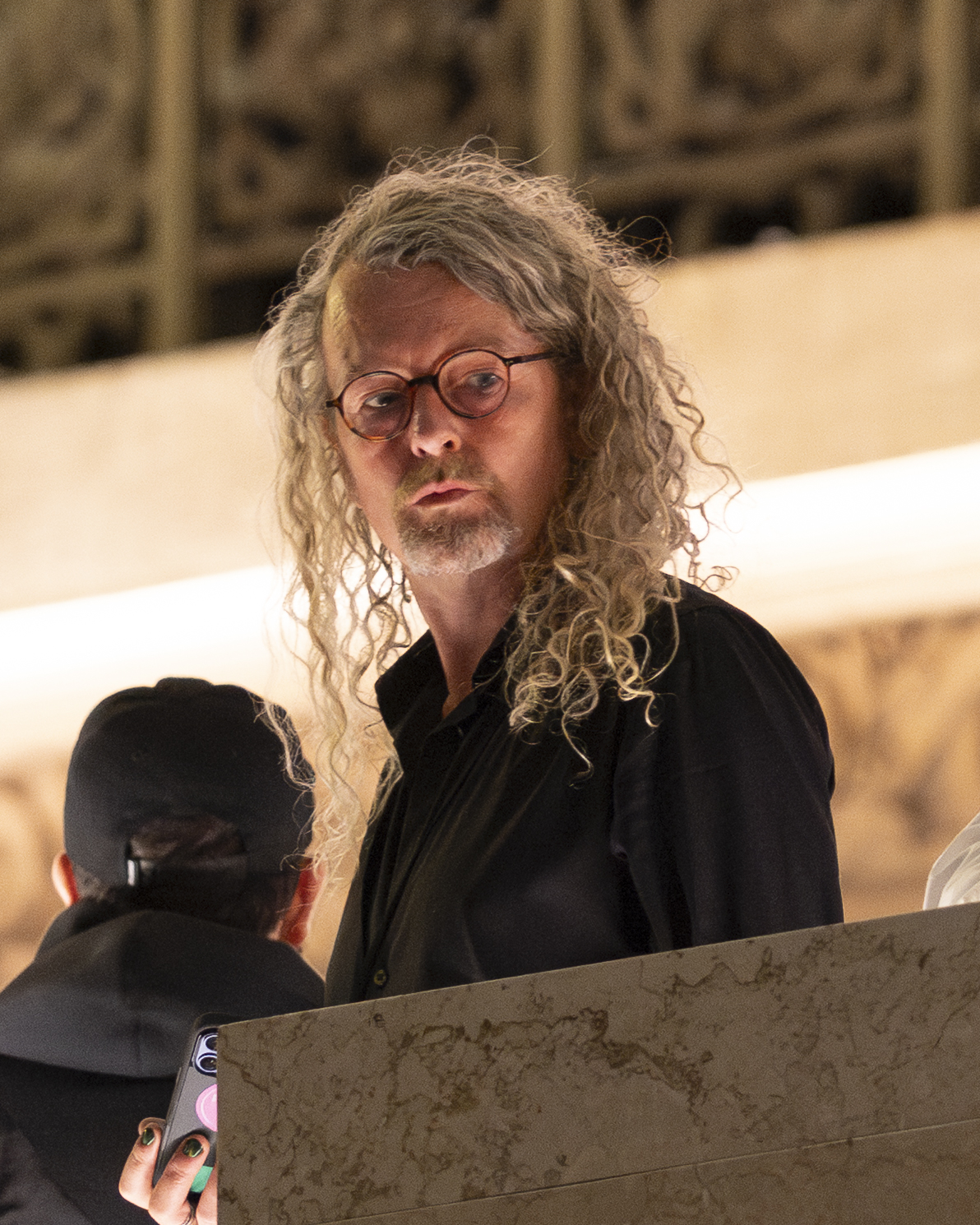
Gilbertson in 2026

Ashley Gilbertson (born 1978) is an Australian photographer. He is known for his images of the Iraq War and the effects of the wars in Afghanistan and Iraq on returning veterans and their families. Gilbertson is a member of VII Photo Agency.

In 2004 Gilbertson won the Robert Capa Gold Medal Award from the Overseas Press Club for his photographic reportage on the Battle for Fallujah.

== Early life and education ==
Born in Melbourne, Australia, Gilbertson started his career at thirteen taking pictures of skateboarders. After graduating secondary school, he was mentored by Filipino photographer Emmanuel Santos, and later Masao Endo in the Japanese highlands.

== Career ==
While based in Australia, Gilbertson worked on socially driven photo essays including on drug addiction in Melbourne and war zones in Southeast Asia and the South Pacific. In 1999 he photographed Kosovar refugees in Australia. For the next three years Gilbertson's work focused on refugee issues around the world.

In 2002, Gilbertson travelled to the Kurdish enclave of northern Iraq. Shortly thereafter, President George W. Bush made a case for war in Iraq, and Gilbertson travelled back to cover the story at the beginning of 2003. His work was published widely. In 2004, The New York Times offered Gilberston and their senior writer, Dexter Filkins, an embed with the 1/8 Marines. Gilbertson continued to cover Iraq on contract for The New York Times until 2008. A photographic memoir of his time there entitled Whiskey Tango Foxtrot: A Photographer's Chronicle of the Iraq War was published in 2007.

In March 2009, he became a member of the VII Photo Agency's VII Network, and in 2011 he became a full member.

Gilbertson's book Bedrooms of the Fallen (2014) consists of panoramic black and white photographs of the bedrooms left behind by 40 U.S., Canadian, and European soldiers—the number of soldiers in a platoon.

== Publications ==
- 21 Days to Baghdad: Photos and Dispatches from the Battlefield. Time, 2003. ISBN 1-932273-12-3.
- Witness Iraq: A War Journal. PowerHouse, 2003.
- Beautiful Suffering: Photography and the Traffic in Pain. University of Chicago Press, 2006.
- Whiskey Tango Foxtrot: A Photographer's Chronicle of the Iraq War. University of Chicago Press, 2007. ISBN 0-226-29325-4.
- Bedrooms of the Fallen. University of Chicago Press, 2014. ISBN 978-0-226-13511-3. With a foreword by Philip Gourevitch.

== Awards ==
- 2001 – Leica/CCP Documentary Award (Melbourne)
- One of his images from the invasion of Iraq was included in Time magazine's 'Pictures of the Year'.
- 2004 – Included in Photo District News '30 under 30'
- 2004 – Publisher's Award, The New York Times
- 2004 – Robert Capa Gold Medal, Overseas Press Club (New York) (winner)
- 2004 – Photographer of the Year, National Photo Awards (Minnesota) (winner)
- 2005 – Joop Swart Masterclass, World Press Photo (Amsterdam) (participant)
- 2008 – The Staige D. Blackford Prize for Nonfiction
- 2009 – Photo District News, Photo Annual
- 2010 – Aaron Siskind Foundation, grant recipient
- 2011 – National Magazine Award, Photography, for his series Bedrooms of the Fallen, published as a work in progress in The New York Times Magazine.
- 2014 – Photo District News, Photo Annual
