= NMGC =

NMGC may refer to:

- Nanoporous Materials Genome Center, developed under the Materials Genome initiative, a materials sciences lab at the University of Minnesota sponsored by the US DOE to study microporous and mesoporous materials for computer design
- National Multicultural Greek Council, a trade association of US-based multicultural fraternities and sororities, founded in 1998
- NeoMagic, a software company, traded over-the-counter as NMGC
- New Mexico Gas Company (NMGC), a subsidiary of Emera, a North American provider of natural gas
