= Michele Manuel =

American materials scientist

Michele V. Manuel is an American materials scientist whose research topics have included biodegradable materials for medical implants, and high-strength self-healing alloys for aerospace applications. She is the U. S. Steel Dean of the Swanson School of Engineering at the University of Pittsburgh.

== Education and career ==
Manuel did her undergraduate studies at the University of Florida, in materials science and engineering, and completed a Ph.D. in the same subject at Northwestern University.

After working at NASA and General Motors, she returned to academia and to the University of Florida in 2008, taking a position as an assistant professor. She became chair of the University of Florida's Department of Materials Science and Engineering in 2017, "the first woman and person of color to hold the position". She also became Rolf E. Hummel Professor of Electronic Materials at the University of Florida. In 2024, she moved to the Swanson School of Engineering as U. S. Steel Dean, becoming the first female dean of engineering at the University of Pittsburgh.

== Recognition ==
Manuel received the Bradley Stoughton Award for Young Teachers of the American Society of Metals in 2013, and the Presidential Early Career Award for Scientists and Engineers in 2016. She was named as a Fellow of the American Society of Metals in 2017. In 2021 she was a recipient of the Brimacombe Medal of The Minerals, Metals & Materials Society "for significant contributions in the integration of systems-based materials design approaches to light metals and her meaningful service to the profession".

In 2022 she was named to the National Academy of Engineering, "for contributions to research, implementation, and teaching of computational materials design of biomimetic self-healing metals and high-performance lightweight alloys".
