= James J. Robinson =

Australian photographer and director (born 1995)

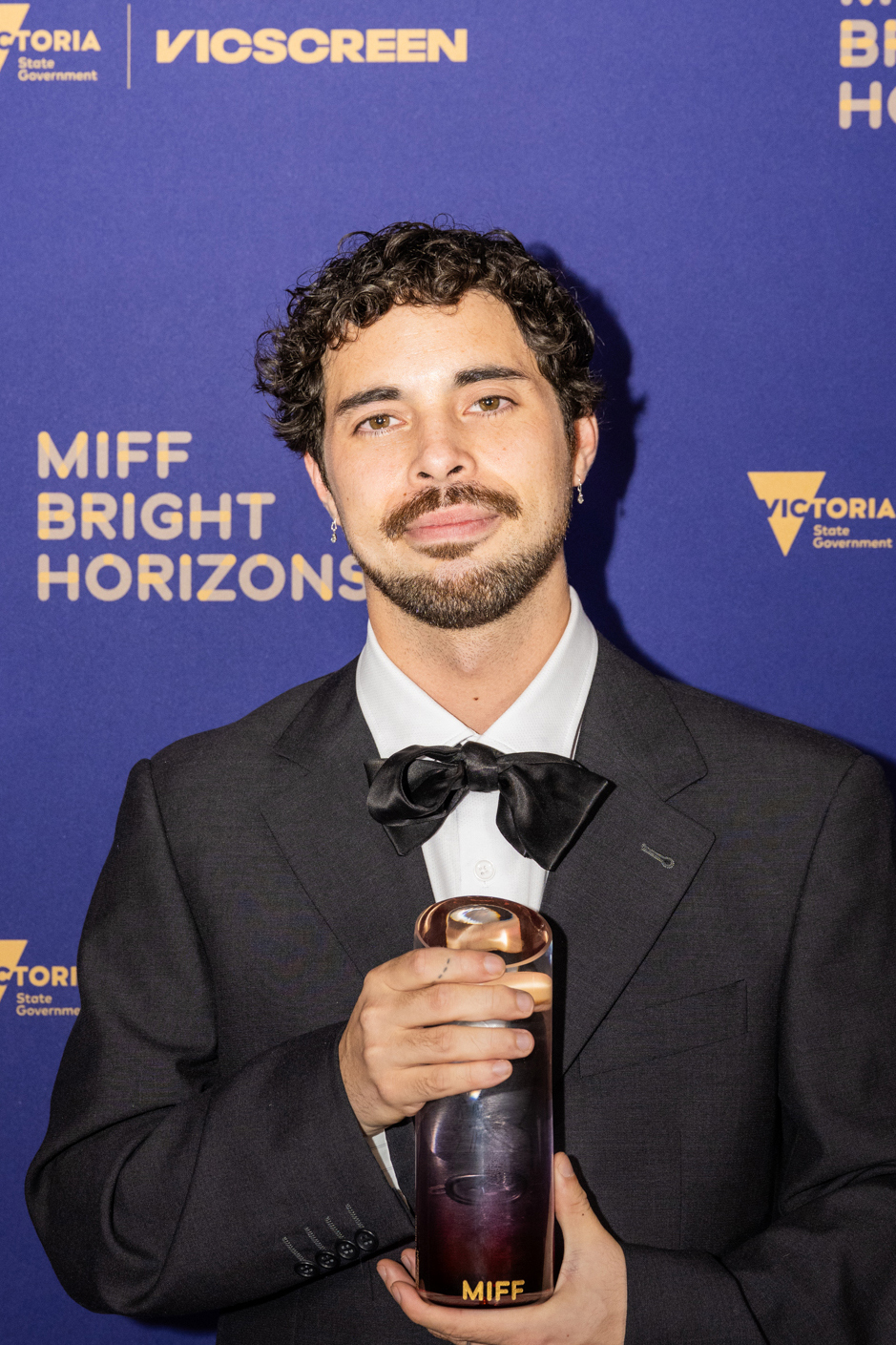
- Robinson in 2025
- Born: July 12, 1995 (age 31); Melbourne, Australia
- Education: Swinburne University of Technology
- Occupations: Photographer, filmmaker
- Years active: 2014–present
- Website: jamespdf.com

James J. Robinson (born July 12, 1995) is an Australian-Filipino filmmaker and photographer known for his work in publications such as Vogue Australia, GQ Australia, and Wonderland. His photography often explores themes of identity, representation, and nostalgia, earning recognition for its cinematic and evocative style.

Robinson's work spans editorial, commercial, and fine art photography, as well as filmmaking. His protest photography piece Burn the Blazer (2021), critiquing the culture of hypermasculinity in his old school St Kevin’s College, made national headlines and sparked widespread cultural commentary.

Robinson's debut feature film as a writer and director, First Light, had its world premiere at the Melbourne International Film Festival in 2025. He was awarded Best Australian Director by an independent jury at the festival for his work on the film.

== Early life ==
James J. Robinson was born and raised in Melbourne's south-eastern suburbs. His mother migrated from the Philippines in the 1970s, and his father is from Albury, New South Wales.

Robinson attended St. Kevin's College, a Catholic all-boys school in Melbourne. He has spoken about the challenges he faced during his time there, citing instances of systemic homophobia and racism within the school's culture. These formative experiences influenced his perspectives on identity and representation as an artist.

Robinson went on to study film at Swinburne University of Technology.

== Career ==
After graduating, Robinson moved to New York. In New York, he began photographing for publications including The New York Times, Los Angeles Times, Vogue Australia, GQ Australia, Refinery29, Gay Times and Wonderland. His editorial work is known for its cinematic lighting style, which is photographed on film.

Robinson has collaborated with celebrities, including Kylie Jenner, Sydney Sweeney, Shania Twain, Rose Byrne, Tame Impala, Harris Dickinson, Demi Lovato and Lily-Rose Depp. His commercial campaigns include work for Maison Valentino, Apple, and The Australian Ballet.

Robinson has directed several short films and music videos. His 2021 short documentary, Inang Maynila, premiered on Nowness and screened at the Brooklyn Film Festival. His debut 2022 solo exhibition, On Golden Days, debuted at the PHOTO 2022 festival in Melbourne, before exhibiting at Gallery Tsukigime in Tokyo, and then online by the Fotografisk Centre's On The Go program in Copenhagen.

In 2021, Robinson's photograph Kevin at Midnight was nominated for the National Photographic Portrait Prize.

Later that year, his protest photography piece Burn the Blazer gained national media coverage. The project, which featured an image of Robinson burning his school blazer on the school's oval, critiqued the culture of hypermasculinity and elitism in Australian same-sex schools and was reported on by The Age, Herald Sun, SBS, Channel 7, ABC News and The Australian. The post went viral and led to "#burntheblazer" trending on social media.

== Filmography ==
In 2024 production began in the Philippines on Robinson's debut feature film, First Light. The film premiered at the Melbourne International Film Festival in 2025, where it was programmed in main competition for the Bright Horizons award. Robinson was awarded with the Blackmagic Design Best Australian Director prize for the film, deliberated by jury president Charlotte Wells and fellow jury members including Alex Ross Perry, Athina Rachel Tsangari and Nam Le.

The Curb's Andy Hazel described the film as “an astonishing debut feature,” praising Robinson’s assured direction and the film’s “painterly, evocative” visuals that "firmly announce a major new voice in Australian and Southeast Asian cinema."

=== Feature film ===
Year	Title	Director	Writer	Notes
2025	First Light	Yes	Yes	Completed

=== Short films ===
Year	Title	Director	Writer
2021	Inang Maynila	Yes	Yes
2022	On Golden Days	Yes	Yes

=== Music videos ===
Year	Title	Artist
2017	"Sense"	Kllo
2017	"Catching Feelings"	Mall Grab
2017	"Love Tonight"	Shouse
2018	"I'm Good"	Wafia
2018	"DYT"	Oscar Key Sung
2021	"Prove It"	Divide and Dissolve
2023	"Teeth"	Mallrat
2023	"Your Love"	Mallrat
2023	"Running With The Hurricane"	Camp Cope
