= Peter Liaw =

Taiwanese materials scientist

Peter K. Liaw is a Taiwanese materials scientist.

Liaw graduated from the National Chiayi Senior High School and pursued a Bachelor of Science in physics from National Tsing Hua University. He then completed a PhD in materials science and engineering at Northwestern University in 1980 and worked in research and development for Westinghouse. In 1993, Liaw began teaching at the University of Tennessee at Knoxville as the Ivan Racheff Chair of Excellence. He currently and concurrently holds the John Fisher Professorship and is a National Alumni Association Distinguished Service Professor. In 2018, Liam was elected a fellow of The Minerals, Metals & Materials Society.
