= Subodh Das =

Indian-American Materials Scientist

Subodh Kumar Das
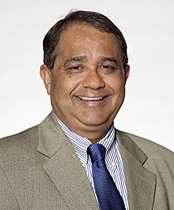
- Subodh Kumar Das
- Born: 19 June 1947 (age 79)
- Education: (B.Tech.) BIT Sindri (M.Tech) IIT Kanpur (PhD) University of Michigan (M.B.A) University of Pittsburgh
- Scientific career
- Workplaces: University of Kentucky

Subodh Kumar Das (born 19 June 1947) is an Indian-American scientist, engineer, and inventor who works in the aluminum industry. He is the founder and CEO of Phinix, LLC, an international consulting firm serving the aluminum industry. Previously, Das has served on the boards of The Aluminum Association, SECAT, Inc., and the Minerals, Metals and Materials Society. The American Society of Metals elected him as ASM Fellow in 2002. The Minerals, Metals and Materials Society also awarded Das its prestigious Distinguished Service Award in 2001. He was also awarded the JOM Best Paper Award in 2011.

== Early life ==
Subodh was born and grew up close to the Nepalese border in small villages and towns of north-eastern province of Bihar in India. He came to the United States in 1971.

== Education ==
Das has attended a number of institutions throughout his career. He received his Bachelor of Science in 1968 from the Birsa Institute of Technology, Sindri) in Jharkhand, India. In 1972, he received his master's in technology, with a focus in metallurgical engineering, from the IIT Kanpur In 1974, he received his PhD in metallurgical engineering from the University of Michigan. In 1982, he received his MBA, with a focus on corporate planning, from the University of Pittsburgh.

== Career ==
=== ALCOA ===
Das' career began in 1974, when he started working for the Aluminum Company of America (ALCOA), in Pittsburgh. Das served as a research scientist, developing new aluminum smelting and carbon electrode technologies. Das would eventually obtain 20 U.S. patents for ALCOA.

=== ARCO ===
Throughout the 1980s and 90s, Das served as the VP of technology and quality for ARCO Aluminum, Inc. in Louisville, Kentucky. Das was involved in various projects, including the manufacturing aspects of alumina refineries, qualifying an aluminum rolling plant (Logan Aluminum in Kentucky, US), and developing and commercializing ARCO Aluminum's can sheet business. Das' efforts in the region led to the product development, customer qualification, and market commercialization of aluminum beverage can sheet products produced from the Logan Aluminum mill, the world's largest can-sheet mill.

=== University of Kentucky ===
Das worked as an adjunct professor for the University of Kentucky from 2004 to 2008. During his tenure in Lexington, he launched a number of projects, including SECAT, Inc., UK's Center for Aluminum Technology, and the Alfred P. Sloan Foundation's Sloan Industry Center for Sustainable Aluminum Industry (CSAI).

=== SECAT, Inc. ===
In the August 1999, Das established SECAT, Inc., a commercial technical research firm whose work focuses primarily on the aluminum industry. The company has also provided opportunities to University of Kentucky students, "providing scholarship and assistantship opportunities, as well as summer and full time employment, to promising students". Das served as SECAT president and CEO from 1999 through 2008.

=== CAT ===
The same year he founded SECAT, Das also established the University of Kentucky's Center for Aluminum Technology, a research center dedicated to conducting basic and applied research for the global aluminum industry. Das served as center director from 1999 to 2008.

=== The Sloan Foundation ===
In 2005, while working with the University of Kentucky's Gatton College of Business and Economics, Das founded the Alfred P. Sloan Foundation's Sloan Industry Center for Sustainable Aluminum Industry (CSAI). The center primarily worked on the business and technology aspects of analyzing, devising implementable strategies and promoting aluminum recycling and enhancing recycling rates for all industrial sectors. Das served as CSAI's executive director from 2005 to 2008.

=== Phinix, LLC ===
In 2008, Das founded Phinix, LLC., an international consulting firm serving the aluminum industry. Phinix also provides services in the areas of the renewable energy project developments for agricultural methane and waste to energy from municipal solid waste and carbon management services to cities, states, and countries. Das is the current CEO of the company.

In 2013, Phinix LLC published Sustainability Gone Postal, a 15-part guide to green living, based on the United States Postal Service Go Green Stamp Collection.

On 19 September 2013, Advanced Research Projects Agency-Energy awarded Phinix a grant to develop a new electrochemical cell technology that can recover high-quality magnesium from aluminum- magnesium scrap. Following the APRA-E announcement, Congressman Andy Barr congratulated Das for Phinix' success, "I congratulate Phinix, LLC as it is announced that the company's innovative metal recycling project will receive funding from ARPA-E following a competitive review process...Phinix's presence in Lexington, established following Dr. Subodh Das's tenure at the University of Kentucky, demonstrates the important role of the Commonwealth's university system in providing an educated workforce for the industries of the future."

== Publications ==
Das has published over 45 papers and has edited 6 books in the areas of aluminum processes, product development, and recycling. Das has signed a contract with John Wiley & Sons, Inc. to publish a book titled, Carbon Management for the Global Metals Industry. The book, scheduled to be published in 2015, addresses the current methods being currently used and suggests new ways to mitigate the carbon footprint.
