= Alan Luo =

American engineer (National Academy of Engineering member)

Alan Aihua Luo (Chinese: 罗爱华; pinyin: Luó ài-Huà) (born 1964) is an American engineer and academic, specializing in advanced materials and manufacturing. He is currently the Donald D. Glower Chair in Engineering, Professor of Materials Science and Engineering and Integrated Systems Engineering (Manufacturing) at The Ohio State University (OSU). Luo is leading the Lightweight Materials and Manufacturing Research Laboratory (LMMRL) and is Director of the Advanced Casting Research Center (ACRC) at OSU. He is also a technical leader in the REMADE (Reducing EMbodied-Energy And Decreasing Emissions) Institute.

In 2023, Luo was elected to the National Academy of Engineering "for the implementation of lightweight aluminum, magnesium, and titanium materials and advanced manufacturing processes for automotive applications".

== Biography ==
Luo was born in Anhui, China in 1964. Luo received his Bachelor of Engineering degree in Mechanical Engineering from Anhui Polytechnic University in 1984, and Master of Engineering degree in Materials Science and Engineering from Harbin Institute of Technology in 1987. He pursued his PhD research on advanced aluminum alloys at the University of Windsor in Canada and obtained his PhD in Engineering Materials in 1993.

After his PhD, Luo went to industry to design lightweight alloys and develop manufacturing processes for the automotive industry. He was a GM Technical Fellow at General Motors Research and Development Center with 20 years of industrial experience.

In 2013, Luo joined the Departments of Materials Science and Engineering and Integrated Systems Engineering at The Ohio State University as a tenured full professor. He has been awarded the Donald D. Glower Chair in Engineering since 2023 for his research and teaching focusing on transportation.

== Research ==
Luo uses classical thermodynamics and CALPHAD (CALculation of PHAse Diagrams) modeling in designing new aluminum, magnesium and lightweight high entropy alloys. His computational thermodynamics tools have been coupled with kinetic models to simulate manufacturing processes (casting, welding and additive manufacturing) to optimize alloy design and processing of multi-component systems for improved mechanical and corrosion properties. Luo has applied the fundamental principles of thermodynamics, kinetics, solidification, thermomechanical processing in developing new and innovative processes for lightweight alloys and composites. For these innovations, he received the 2023 TMS Research to Industrial Practice Award.

== Major awards and honors ==
- 2023 Elected Member of the National Academy of Engineering
- 2023 Fellow Award and Research to Industrial Practice Award, TMS
- 2021 Bruce Chalmers Award, TMS
- 2021 LMD (Light Metals Division) Distinguished Service Award, TMS
- 2020 International Magnesium Award for Distinguished Scientist, International Magnesium Society
- 2017 Award of Excellence for Automotive Product, International Magnesium Association (IMA)
- 2015 Fellow, Society for Automotive Engineering (SAE) International
- 2013 Fellow, American Society for Metals (ASM) International
- 2013 Brimacombe Medalist Award, TMS
- 2004-2006 three Charles L. McCuen Awards, technology implementation awards, General Motors R&D Center
- 2003 and 2008 two John M. Campbell Awards, fundamental research awards, General Motors R&D Center
