= Bruce W. Wessels =

American materials scientist (1946–2024)

- Born: 1946; Glen Cove, New York, U.S.
- Died: April 7, 2024; Wilmette, Illinois, U.S.
- Known for: Electronic materials research Semiconductor defect characterization
- Awards: Fellow, American Physical Society; Fellow, Optica; Fellow, ASM International; Fellow, TMS

Academic background
- Education: University of Pennsylvania (BS); Massachusetts Institute of Technology (PhD)

Academic work
- Discipline: Materials science
- Institutions: Northwestern University; General Electric

Bruce W. Wessels (1946 – April 7, 2024) was an American materials scientist and academic who spent most of his career at Northwestern University, where he held the Walter P. Murphy Professorship in Materials Science and Engineering. He founded the university's Electronic Materials Program and made contributions to semiconductor defect characterization, optoelectronic materials, and ferroelectric thin films.

== Early life and education ==
Wessels was born in 1946 in Glen Cove, New York, and graduated from Glen Cove High School in 1964. He received his Bachelor of Science degree in Metallurgy and Materials Science from the University of Pennsylvania in 1968. He earned his Ph.D. in Materials Science from the Massachusetts Institute of Technology in 1972.

== Career ==
=== Industry ===
After completing his doctorate, Wessels worked at General Electric from 1972 to 1977, where he developed fabrication processes for light-emitting diodes (LEDs).

=== Northwestern University ===
Wessels joined Northwestern University's McCormick School of Engineering as an assistant professor in 1977. He was promoted to associate professor in 1980 and full professor in 1984.

He founded the Electronic Materials Program within the Department of Materials Science and Engineering and served as its director from 1980 to 1990. In 1987, he received a concurrent appointment in the Department of Electrical Engineering and Computer Science. He was named the Walter P. Murphy Professor of Materials Science and Engineering in 1998.

Wessels served as chair of the Department of Electrical Engineering and Computer Science from 2005 to 2007, during the first two years following the merger of the electrical engineering and computer science departments. He also directed the MRC Microfabrication facility and chaired the General Faculty Committee.

He became professor emeritus in 2020 and continued research activities until his death.

== Research ==
Wessels's research focused on thin films and nanostructures for electronic, magnetic, and photonic applications. His work included:

- Development of transient current spectroscopy techniques for detecting semiconductor defects at part-per-billion concentrations
- Preparation of II-VI and III-V compound semiconductors for optoelectronic devices
- Epitaxial growth of ferroelectric oxide thin films, including barium titanate photonic crystal electro-optic modulators
- Demonstration of ferromagnetic semiconductors (InMnAs and InMnSb) with Curie temperatures above room temperature
- Development of perovskite semiconductors for radiation detection

He published 405 peer-reviewed articles and held 21 U.S. patents. His publications appeared in journals including Nature Communications, Physical Review Letters, Journal of the American Chemical Society, and Applied Physics Letters.

He served on the editorial board of the Journal of Electronic Materials from 1982 to 1988 and as associate editor from 1997 to 2008.

== Professional affiliations ==
Wessels was elected a fellow of multiple professional organizations:

- Fellow, American Physical Society (2003), cited for "seminal contributions to understanding of defect structure and dopant behavior in epitaxial semiconductor and ferroelectric oxide thin films and heterostructures"
- Fellow, Optica (2014), for "pioneering research in epitaxial materials and devices, especially wide-gap semiconductors and ferroelectric oxides for optoelectronic and electro-optic applications"
- Fellow, ASM International
- Fellow, The Minerals, Metals & Materials Society (2016)

He served as president of The Minerals, Metals & Materials Society (TMS) in 1996 and concurrently as president of the TMS Foundation. He was also an AIME Trustee from 1996 to 1997.

== Personal life ==
Wessels resided in Wilmette, Illinois. He died on April 7, 2024, at age 77. He was survived by his wife, two children, eight grandchildren, and other family members.
