= Elizabeth A. Holm =

American materials scientist

Elizabeth Ann Holm
- Education: Michigan (Ph.D., B.S.E.); MIT (S.M.)
- Scientific career
- Fields: Materials science Microstructure; Strength of materials
- Workplaces: University of Michigan
- Thesis: Modeling microstructural evolution in single-phase, composite and two-phase polycrystals (1992)
- Doctoral advisor: David J. Srolovitz

Elizabeth Ann Holm, Richard F. and Eleanor A. Towner Professor of Engineering, is chair of the Department of Materials Science and Engineering, University of Michigan. Her research focus is computational materials. She worked at Sandia National Laboratories for 20 years before joining the faculty of Carnegie Mellon in 2012. She was elected to the 2025 class of the National Academy of Engineering. She is a Fellow of The Minerals, Metals & Materials Society and Fellow of ASM International. She was the 2013 President of the society. She is internationally known for her theory and modeling work on microstructural response, interfaces, carbon nanotubes, and additive manufacturing.

== Education ==
Holm received her Bachelor of Science in Engineering degree in Materials Science and Engineering from the University of Michigan in 1987. She moved to Massachusetts Institute of Technology for a Master of Science in Ceramics in 1989, before returning to the University of Michigan to earn dual Ph.D.s in materials science and engineering and scientific computing in 1992.

== Research and career ==
Holm performs research on microstructural evolution in complex polycrystals employing computational materials science tools. She has bridged length scales from molecular dynamics at the atomic scale to Monte Carlo and phase field methods at the mesoscale to finite element at the continuum scale. Her research areas include theory and modeling of microstructural evolution in complex polycrystals, physical and mechanical response of microstructures, and machine learning to predict rare events. She makes novel use of machine vision and machine learning.

In 2023, Holm returned to the University of Michigan as chair of the Materials Science and Engineering Department of the College of Engineering.

== Awards and recognition ==
- 2002 Fellow of ASM International
- 2013 President of The Minerals, Metals & Materials Society
- 2019 Fellow of The Minerals, Metals & Materials Society
- 2020 The Minerals, Metals & Materials Society Alexander Scott Distinguished Service Award
- 2025 Member of the National Academy of Engineering
