= Viola Acoff =

American metallurgist and academic

Viola L. Acoff
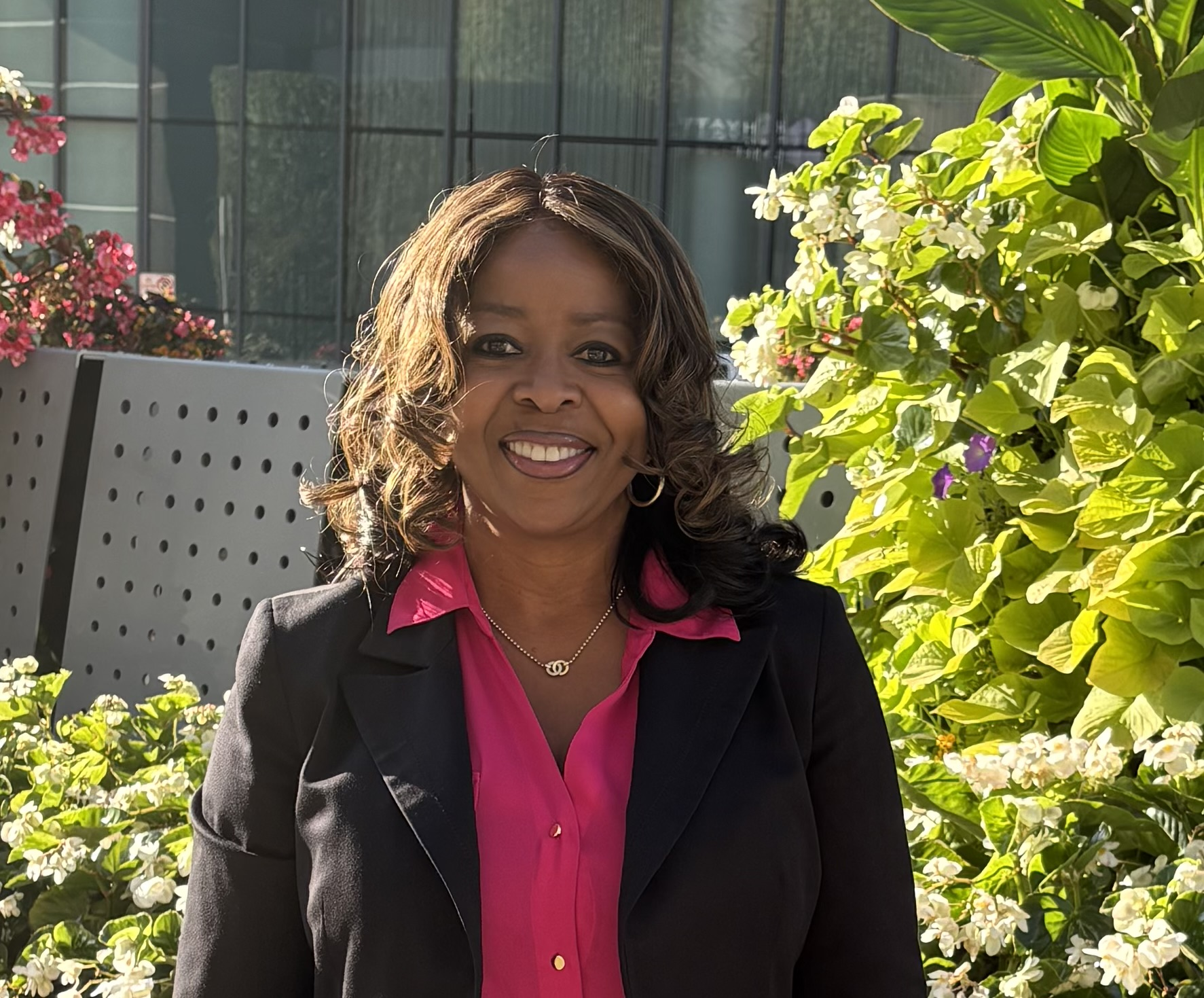
- Education: University of Alabama, BIrmingham (BS, MS, and Ph.D)
- Occupations: Metallurgist and academic
- Employer(s): University of Alabama, Birmingham
- Organization(s): The Minerals, Metals & Materials Society, president
- Title: Dean of Engineering and Professor of Mechanical Engineering,
- Website: https://olemiss.edu/profiles/vacoff

Viola L. Acoff is an American metallurgist. She is the dean of the school of engineering at the University of Mississippi. She is the current president of The Minerals, Metals & Materials Society (TMS) for 2026.

== Early life and education ==
Acoff received her bachelor's of science in materials engineering from the University of Alabama Birmingham in 1989. She continued her graduate education at this institution, completing both a master of science in materials engineering with a thesis titled “The effect of Postweld Heat Treatment on the Fusion Zone Microstructure and Microhardness of Ti-14.2 Wt% Al-21.3 Wt% Nb Titanium Aluminide” in 1991 and a Ph.D. with a dissertation titled “An Analysis of constitutional Liquid Film Migration in Nickel-Base Alloy 718” in 1994.

== Career ==
Acoff began her academic career as an assistant professor in the department of metallurgical and materials engineering at the University of Alabama Tuscaloosa in 1994 and was the first African American female faculty member in the University of Alabama College of Engineering. She was promoted to associate professor with tenure in 2000 and full professor in 2004, a title she held until she left the University of Alabama in 2023. During her time there she served as the department head of the department of metallurgical and materials engineering from 2009 to 2014, and also the department head of chemical and biological engineering from 2008-2010. She was appointed the Associate Dean for Undergraduate and Graduate programs for the college of engineering in 2014 and served in that role until leaving the University of Alabama in 2023. Acoff was appointed as the Dean of the School of Engineering at the University of Mississippi with a full professorship in mechanical engineering in July of 2023.

In parallel to her academic positions Acoff has served in a number of leadership roles. These include the director of the University of Alabama's National Science Foundation Louis Stokes Alliance for Minority Participation (LSAMP) since 1996 and the project manager of the Alabama LSAMP program since 2016. She served as the Vice President of TMS for 2025 and is the incoming president for 2026.

== Recognition ==
- Distinguished Lectureship in Materials and Society Award (2023) from The Minerals, Metals and Materials Society and ASM International, formerly known as the American Society for Metals.
- Inaugural Ellen Swallow Richards Award from The Minerals, Metals & Materials Society (TMS) in 2014.
- T. Morris Hackney Endowed Faculty Leadership Award
- Fellow of the Southeastern Conference Academic Leadership Development Program
- University of Alabama Alumni Association Outstanding Commitment to Teaching Award for 2014
- Recognized as one the Most Influential Corporate Directors by Women Inc. and as one of the Most Influential Black Corporate Directors by Savoy magazine.
