= Kevin Hemker =

American mechanical engineering professor

Alonzo G. Decker Chair in Mechanical Engineering Kevin Hemker
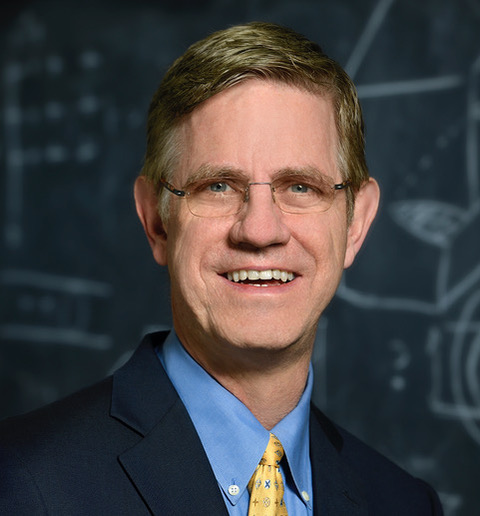
- Born: United States
- Occupation: Professor
- Spouse: Maria Oliva-Hemker

Academic background
- Education: Stanford University (Ph.D.) University of Cincinnati (B.S.)

Kevin J. Hemker is the Alonzo G. Decker Chair and Professor of Mechanical Engineering at Johns Hopkins University and holds joint appointments in the Departments of Materials Science & Engineering and Earth & Planetary Sciences.

== Education ==
He earned a BS in metallurgy from the University of Cincinnati, MS and PhD degrees in materials science and engineering from Stanford University, and completed a postdoctoral fellowship in physics at the Ecole Polytechnique Federale de Lausanne. His doctoral advisor at Stanford was Prof. William Nix.

== Career ==
He joined the faculty at Johns Hopkins University in 1993, was an NSF National Young Investigator (1994), an invited Professor at the EPFL (1995) and the University of Paris XIII (2001), and received the ASM Materials Science Research Silver Medal in 2001. He served as Chair of the Department of Mechanical Engineering (2007–2013) and editor of Scripta Materialia (2004–2011).

Hemker was a member and vice-chair of the DARPA Defense Science Research Council (2010–2014), a member of the SRI Technology Council (2017–2019) and was the 2018 President of The Minerals, Metals & Materials Society (TMS). He is currently a member of the HRL Technical Advisory Group and the NCMS AMMP Advisory Council. Hemker has been named Fellow of AAAS, ASME, ASM International and TMS.

Hemker has mentored over 75 postdoctoral fellows, doctoral and masters students since coming to Hopkins, about 20 of whom now have tenured or tenure-track academic positions in major research universities (U Penn, UIUC, UCSB, Tohoku U, U Freiburg, KAIST, TAMU, and others).

== Research ==
The results of Hemker's research have been disseminated in approximately 250 scientific articles, 4 co-edited books and over 300 invited presentations and plenary lectures.

Hemker's research expertise centers on identifying the underlying atomic, nano and microstructural details that govern the mechanical response, performance and reliability of materials. His group has made key observations and discoveries in:

- nanostructured materials,
- materials for MEMS,
- metallic micro-lattices,
- structural intermetallics
- thermal barrier coatings for gas turbines and satellites, armor ceramics and high temperature aerospace materials.

More recent activities include the development of nanotwinned NiMoW thin films with extreme strength (3-4GPa) and an exceptional balance of properties. Having demonstrated that they can be micromachined into micro-cantilevers with requisite dimensional stability, Hemker collaborates with General Electric to promote the use of metal MEMS devices for use in extreme environments and the Internet of Things (IoT). A parallel effort involves the marriage of topology optimization-based design, small-scale and scale-specific characterization and the fabrication of architected materials with 3D textile and additive manufacturing.

More fundamental studies include atomic-scale characterization of boron carbide with high resolution TEM and atom probe tomography, nanoscale orientation and stress mapping, and the advancement of ICMSE and MGI principles through the development of micro-scale experiments to benchmark physics-based hierarchal models at appropriate scales.

== Awards and recognition ==
2016	Fellow, American Association for the Advancement of Science (AAAS)
2014	Fellow, The Minerals, Metals, Materials Society (TMS)
2009	Fellow, American Society of Materials (ASM International)
2007	Fellow, American Society of Mechanical Engineers (ASME)
2001	Materials Science Research Silver Medal, American Society of Materials (ASM)
1994	National Young Investigator, National Science Foundation, Division of Materials Research, Metals Research Program
1994	Research Initiation Award, National Science Foundation, Directorate for Engineering, Mechanics and Materials Program
1985	Herman Schneider Medal (top engineering graduate), University of Cincinnati
