= JOM (journal) =

- Discipline: Materials science
- Language: English
- Edited by: Justin A. Scott, Maureen Byko

Publication details
- Former name: Journal of Metals
- History: 1949–present
- Publisher: The Minerals, Metals & Materials Society (TMS), Springer Science+Business Media
- Frequency: Monthly
- Impact factor: 2.471 (2020)

Standard abbreviations
- ISO 4: JOM

Indexing
- ISSN: 1047-4838 (print); 1543-1851 (web)

Links
- Journal homepage; Web-enhanced JOM archive (1997 to 2011)

JOM is a technical journal devoted to exploring the many aspects of materials, science and engineering published monthly by The Minerals, Metals & Materials Society (TMS) (a member-based professional society). JOM reports scholarly work that explores the many aspects of materials science and engineering within the broad topical areas of light metals, structural materials, functional materials, extraction and processing, and materials processing and manufacturing. JOM strives to balance the interests of the laboratory and the marketplace by reporting academic, industrial, and government-sponsored work from around the world.

== History ==
From 1949 through 1988, the journal was named Journal of Metals. With materials systems becoming commonplace and with the journal frequently covering composites, plastics, and other materials, its name was changed to JOM. It is published by TMS, which is headquartered in Pittsburgh, Pennsylvania.
