= Terence G. Langdon =

British scientist and academic

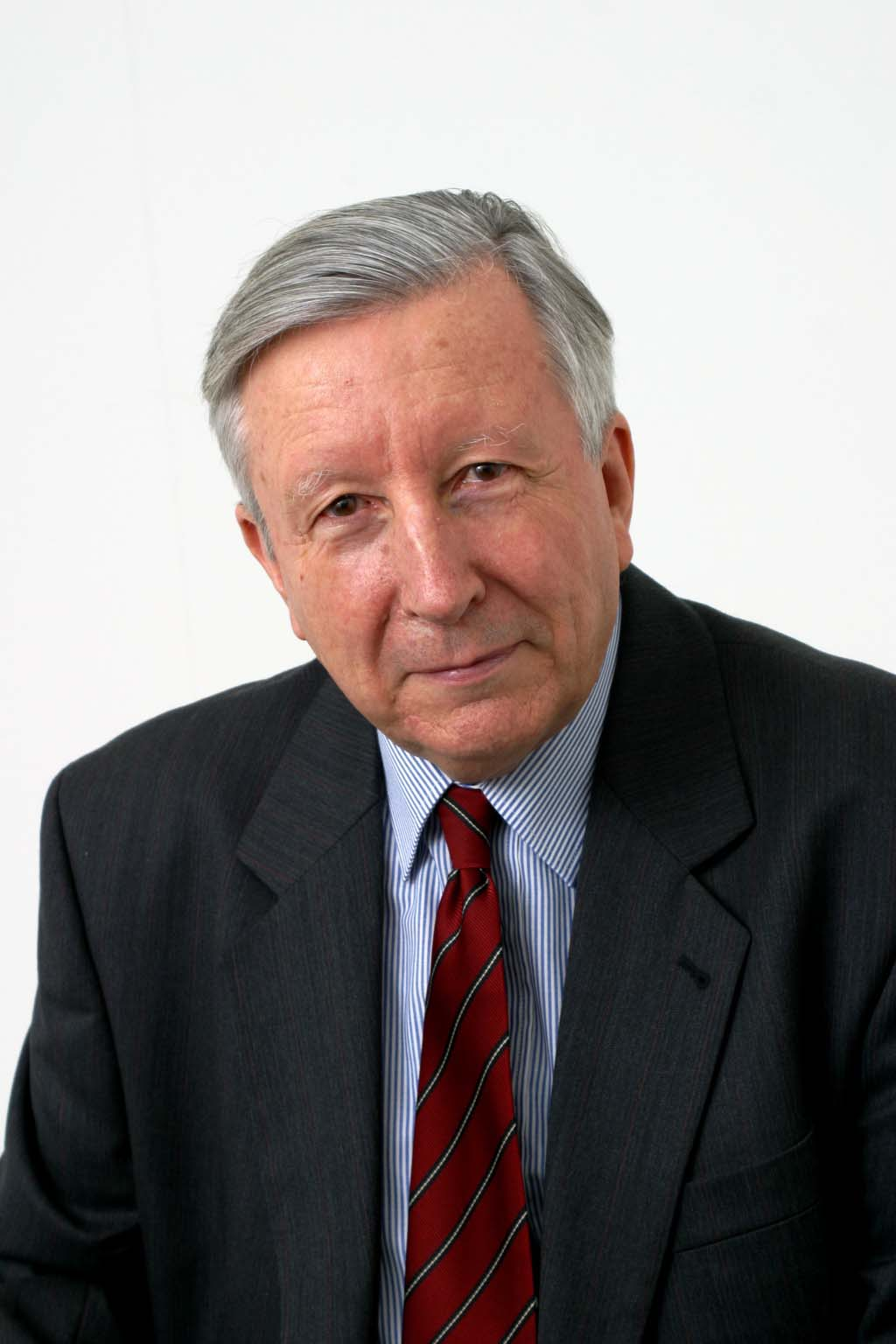
- Education: B.Sc. Physics; Ph.D., Physical Metallurgy; D.Sc. Physics
- Alma mater: University of Bristol; Imperial College
- Known for: Grain boundary sliding, creep, superplasticity, severe plastic deformation, ultrafine-grained materials
- Awards: Sōmiya Award, IUMRS (2005); Acta Materialia Gold Medal (2012)
- Scientific career
- Fields: Materials Science
- Institutions: University of Southampton; University of Southern California

Terence G. Langdon is a British scientist and an academic. He was a Professor of Materials Science at the University of Southampton from 2012 to 2025, and he is a Professor of Engineering Emeritus at the University of Southern California.

== Education ==
Langdon graduated in Physics from the University of Bristol in 1961 and received his Ph.D. in Physical Metallurgy from Imperial College, University of London, in 1965. Moreover, he received a D.Sc. degree in Physics from the University of Bristol in 1980. He also received honorary doctorates from the Russian Academy of Sciences in 2003 and Peter the Great Saint Petersburg Polytechnic University in 2016.

== Career ==
Following post-doctoral positions at the University of California Berkeley, the University of Cambridge and the University of British Columbia, Langdon was appointed Associate Professor of Materials Science and Mechanical Engineering at the University of Southern California in 1971 and then promoted to Professor in 1976. In 2003 he was appointed the William E. Leonhard Professor of Engineering at USC. In 2012 he retired, was appointed Emeritus Professor at USC, and returned to England to take an appointment as Professor of Materials Science at the University of Southampton. Moreover, he has held numerous visiting appointments at various institutions including Universidad Nacional Autónoma de México, University of Melbourne, and Danish Technical University. Besides, he holds several visiting and honorary appointments at various institutions including Kyushu University, Warsaw University of Technology, University of Tehran, Federal University of Minas Gerais, Beijing Institute of Technology, Harbin Institute of Technology, and Nanjing University of Science and Technology. Additionally, he is a Professor of Engineering Emeritus at the University of Southern California, USA.

Langdon is a Fellow of ASM, TMS, MRS, AAAS, the American Ceramic Society, the Institute of Physics, the Institute of Materials, Minerals and Mining, and an Honorary Member of the Japan Institute of Metals. He was appointed as a Foreign Academician at the Academy of Sciences of the Bashkortostan Republic, Russia, in 1994, a Fellow of The Royal Academy of Engineering in the U.K. in 2002, a Fellow of The European Academy of Sciences in 2008, and a Member of the Academia Europaea in 2014.

== Research ==
According to Web of Science, Langdon has published over 1300 papers in peer-reviewed journals. He was ranked number 2 worldwide out of 3123 materials scientists by Web of Science for his publications in the field of Materials Science, based on the number of citations received for papers published from January 1996 to December 2006. Additionally, he held the number 3 worldwide ranking for the total number of High Impact Papers published in Materials Science during the period 1981–2001. He was recognized by Thomson Reuters/ISI in the 2014 Highly Cited Researchers List for citations received for publications from January 2002 to December 2012. Furthermore, research.com ranked him as the 5th best Materials Science Scientist in the United Kingdom, based on data collected up to December 2022. Langdon’s research has received more than 100,000 citations.

Langdon's research centered initially on the flow mechanisms occurring in the high-temperature creep of metals and especially on the role of grain boundary sliding and the interactions between flow by dislocation climb and dislocation glide. Later, he expanded this work to cover metals, ceramics and geological materials. He undertook extensive research on superplasticity and especially the significance of grain boundary sliding under both creep conditions with reasonably large grain sizes and superplastic flow with grain sizes typically smaller than ~10 μm. His report in 1977 of a superplastic tensile elongation of 4850% in a Pb-62% Sn eutectic alloy was followed in 1994 by a record-breaking elongation of 7550% in the same alloy. With experiments in Russia in 1988 showing that it was possible to use the application of severe plastic deformation (SPD) to achieve exceptional grain refinement in metals, to the submicrometer or even the nanometer range, he travelled to Russia in 1989 and then set up the first experimental SPD facility outside of Russia. Using this equipment, he published in 1993 the first scientific report from a western institute describing the use of SPD in producing ultrafine-grained materials. Much of his more recent research has focused on the use and development of SPD procedures, the unusual and beneficial mechanical characteristics that may be achieved using this type of processing and, more recently, the potential for achieving a unified understanding of the effect of grain size on the flow of metals at both high and low temperatures.

== Awards and honors ==
- 2000 – Henry Marion Howe Medal, ASM International
- 2005 – Special issue of Materials Science and Engineering A published in honour of 65th birthday
- 2005 – Structural Materials Division Distinguished Scientist/Engineer Award, The Minerals, Metals and Materials Society
- 2005 – Sōmiya Award, International Union of Materials Research Societies
- 2007 – Albert Sauveur Achievement Award, ASM International
- 2009 – Lee Hsun Award and Lecture, Chinese Academy of Sciences
- 2009 – Honorary Medal "De Scientia et Humanitate Optime Meritis," Academy of Sciences of the Czech Republic
- 2009 – Memorial Medal of the Faculty of Mathematics and Physics, Charles University, Prague
- 2012 – Acta Materialia Gold Medal
- 2018 – Oleg D. Sherby Award, The Minerals, Metals and Materials Society
- 2020 – Special issue of Advanced Engineering Materials published in honour of 80th birthday
- 2023 – Senior Career Award, Journal of Materials Research and Technology, São Paulo, Brazil
- 2025 – William D. Nix Award, The Minerals, Metals and Materials Society

== Bibliography ==
=== Books ===
- Nanomaterials by Severe Plastic Deformation: NanoSPD5 (2010) ISBN 9783038134558
- Bulk Nanostructured Materials: Fundamentals and Applications (2013) ISBN 9781118095409
- Ultrafine-Grained Materials (2024) ISBN 9783031317286

=== Selected articles ===
- Iwahashi, Y., Horita, Z., Nemoto, M., Wang, J., & Langdon, T. G. (1996). Principle of equal-channel angular pressing for the processing of ultra-fine grained materials. Scripta Materialia, 35(2), 143-146.
- Iwahashi, Y., Horita, Z., Nemoto, M., & Langdon, T. G. (1998). The process of grain refinement in equal-channel angular pressing. Acta Materialia, 46(9), 3317–3331.
- Valiev, R. Z., & Langdon, T. G. (2006). Principles of equal-channel angular pressing as a processing tool for grain refinement. Progress in Materials Science, 51(7), 881–981.
- Valiev, R. Z., Estrin, Y., Horita, Z., Langdon, T. G., Zechetbauer, M. J., & Zhu, Y. T. (2006). Producing bulk ultrafine-grained materials by severe plastic deformation. JOM, 58(4), 33–39.
- Zhilyaev, A. P., & Langdon, T. G. (2008). Using high-pressure torsion for metal processing: Fundamentals and applications. Progress in Materials Science, 53(6), 893–979.
