= Dan J. Thoma =

American metallurgist

- Born: January 30, 1963 (age 63)
- Citizenship: American
- Education: University of Wisconsin–Madison
- Scientific career
- Fields: Metallurgy
- Workplaces: Grainger Institute for Engineering, University of Wisconsin–Madison
- Website: Official website

Dan J. Thoma (born January 30, 1963) is an American metallurgist who is a Professor in the Department of Materials Science and Engineering at the University of Wisconsin–Madison. He is the director of the Grainger Institute for Engineering at the University of Wisconsin–Madison. Thoma is also a past President of the American Institute of Mining, Metallurgical, and Petroleum Engineers (AIME). Thoma is well-known for his research on 3D printing technology, which he has carried out for over two decades.

== Education ==
Thoma attended the University of Cincinnati for his undergraduate studies, and obtained a B.S. in Metallurgical Engineering in 1986. During his undergraduate studies, Thoma was a co-op student at the NASA Lewis Research Center in Cleveland, Ohio. In 1992, he graduated with a Ph.D. in Metallurgical Engineering from the University of Wisconsin–Madison.

== Career ==
From 1992 to 2015, Thoma worked at the Los Alamos National Laboratory in Los Alamos, New Mexico, where he most recently served as the Deputy Division Leader at the Materials Science and Technology Division.

In 2015, he became the inaugural director of the Grainger Institute for Engineering at UW-Madison's College of Engineering. The institute had been initially given a funding of $25 million by the Grainger Foundation in Illinois in 2014. The Grainger Institute for Engineering is currently part of the College of Engineering at UW-Madison.

Thoma's research interests include 3D printing technology, additive manufacturing, materials processing, and alloying theory.

Thoma has received a number of honors and awards, including the 2010 Distinguished Achievement Award from the College of Engineering at the University of Wisconsin–Madison, and 2019 TMS Fellow Award.

== Memberships and affiliations ==
Thoma has been the president of several societies and institutes.

- 2003: The Minerals, Metals & Materials Society (TMS)
- 2008: American Institute of Mining, Metallurgical, and Petroleum Engineers (AIME)
- 2009-2010: Federation of Materials Societies (FMS)

Thoma currently sits on the Advisory Board of Directors of the NASA University Leadership Initiative, the eXtremeMat Technical Advisory Board, the AIME Council of Excellence, the HC Starck Strategic Advisory Council, and the University of California, Irvine Institute for Design and Manufacturing Innovation Advisory Board. Thoma is a former member of the Board of Directors of the Midwest Energy Research Consortium (M-WERC).

== Selected publications ==
Dan Thoma has over 120 publications, some of which are:

1. A.J. Clarke, S.D. Imhoff, J.C. Cooley, B.M. Patterson, W.-K. Lee, K. Fezzaa, A. Deriy, T.J. Tucker, M.R. Barker, K.D. Clarke, R.D. Field, D.J. Thoma, D.F. Teter. "Proton Radiography Peers into Metal Solidification". Scientific Reports, 3, 2020 (2013).
2. R. D. Field and D.J. Thoma. "Crystallographic and Kinetic Origins of Acicular and Banded Microstructures in U-Nb Alloys". J. of Nuclear Materials, 436, 105-117 (2013).
3. A.J. Clarke, R.D. Field, R.J. McCabe, C.M. Cady, R.E. Hackenberg, D.J. Thoma. "EBSD and FIB/TEM Examination of Shape Memory Effect Deformation Structures in U-14 at.% Nb". Acta Materialia, 35, 2638-2648 (2008).
4. J.C. Lashley, H. Ledbetter, T.W. Darling, A. Saxena, A. Malinowski, M.F. Hundley, J.L. Smith and D.J. Thoma. "Free-Energy Density of the Shape-Memory Alloy AuZn". Materials Transactions, 47, 587-593 (2006).
5. R.D. Field, D.J. Thoma, P.S. Dunn, D.W. Brown, and C.M. Cady. "Martensite Structures and Deformation Twinning in the U-Nb Shape Memory Alloys". Philosophical Magazine A, 81, 1691-1724, (2001).
6. D.J. Thoma. "Intermetallics: Laves Phases". In Encyclopedia of Materials: Science and Technology (Elsevier Science Ltd., London) 4205-4213 (2001).
7. D.F. Teter and D.J. Thoma. "The Prediction of the Hydriding Thermodynamics of Pd-Rh-Co Ternary Alloys". Metallurgical and Materials Transactions B, 30, 667-673, (2000).
8. F. Chu, D.J. Thoma, K. McClellan, P. Peralta. "Mo5Si3 Single Crystals: Physical Properties and Mechanical Behavior". Materials Science and Engineering A 261, 44-52, (1999).
9. M.A. Willard, D.E. Laughlin, M.E. McHenry, D.J. Thoma, K. Sickafus, J.O. Cross, V.G. Harris. "Structure and Magnetic Properties of (Fe.5Co.5)88Zr7B4Cu1 Nanocrystalline Alloys". J. of Applied Physics 84, 6773-6777, (1998).
10. J.O. Milewski, G.K. Lewis, D.J. Thoma, G.I. Keel, R.B. Nemec, and R.A. Reinert. Directed Light Fabrication of a Solid Metal Hemisphere Using 5-Axis Powder Deposition". Journal of Materials Processing Technology, 75, 165-172, (1998).
11. F. Chu, D. J. Thoma, P. G. Kotula, S. Gerstl, T. E. Mitchell, I. M. Anderson, and J. Bentley. "Phase Stability and Defect Structure of the C15 Laves Phase Nb(Cr,V)2 ". Acta Mater., 46 #5, 1759-1769, (1998).
12. R.D. Field and D.J. Thoma. "In-Situ Hydrogen Charging of Pd and Pd-Rh in the TEM". Scripta Materialia, 37 #3, 347-353, (1997).
13. D.J. Thoma, G.K. Lewis, and R.B. Nemec. "Solidification Behavior during Directed Light Fabrication". In Beam Processing of Advanced Materials, J. Singh, ed. (ASM, Materials Park, OH), 247-253, (1996).
14. D.J. Thoma and J.H. Perepezko. "A Geometric Analysis of Solubility Ranges in Laves Phases". J. of Alloys and Compounds, 224, 330-341, (1995).
15. D.J. Thoma and J.H. Perepezko. "An Experimental Evaluation of the Phase Relationships and Solubilities in the Nb-Cr System". Mater. Sci. & Eng. A, 156, 97-108, (1992).
