= Maria Oliva-Hemker =

Cuban-American paediatrician

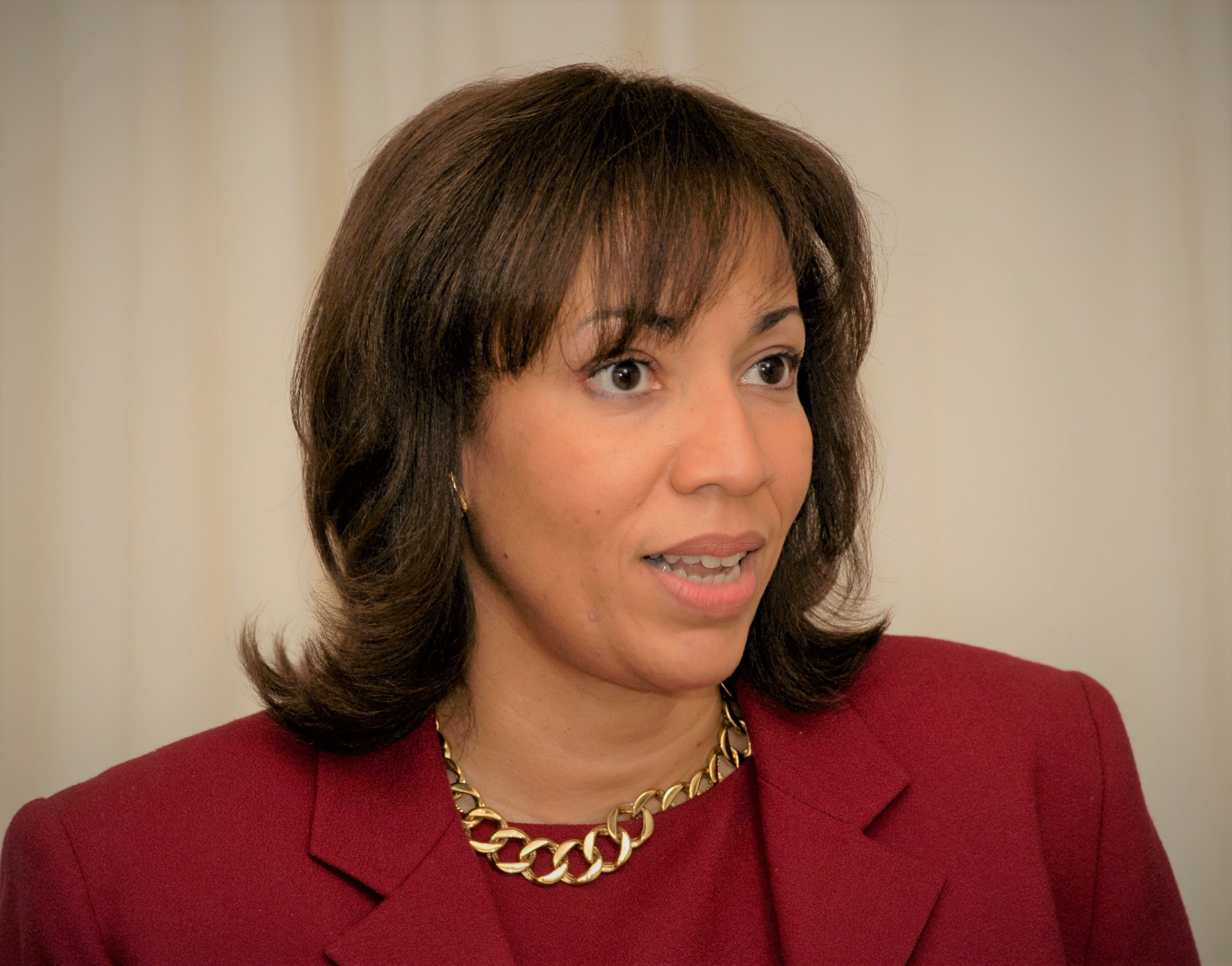
- Born: Cuba
- Spouse: Kevin Hemker
- Parent(s): Erneido Oliva, Graciela Oliva

Academic background
- Education: Georgetown University; Johns Hopkins School of Medicine, MD, 1986

Academic work
- Institutions: Johns Hopkins School of Medicine

Maria M. Oliva-Hemker is a Cuban-American pediatrician. She is the Stermer Family Professor of Pediatric Inflammatory Bowel Disease (IBD), Director of the Division of Pediatric Gastroenterology, Hepatology and Nutrition and Vice Dean for Faculty at the Johns Hopkins University School of Medicine.

== Early life and education ==
Oliva-Hemker was born to Army General Erneido Oliva in Cuba. Her family was exiled to the United States when she was a child. She received her undergraduate degree from Georgetown University. Oliva-Hemker was then accepted into Johns Hopkins School of Medicine where she remained for her residency and fellowship in pediatrics.

== Career ==
Following her residency and fellowship, Oliva-Hemker joined the Johns Hopkins faculty in 1993. During her early years with the institution, she launched the Pediatric Inflammatory Bowel Disease (IBD) Center at Johns Hopkins, which specializes in the evaluation, diagnosis, and treatment of children and teens with Crohn's disease and ulcerative colitis. In 2005, she was appointed the inaugural Stermer Family Professorship in Pediatric Inflammatory Bowel Disease in the Department of Pediatrics.

Dr. Oliva-Hemker is an active clinical researcher who has co-authored more than 100 articles and book chapters and is regularly invited to give national and international talks. She has served on multiple editorial boards and organizational leaders positions including the Subboard of Pediatric Gastroenterology of the American Board of Pediatrics, the Crohn's and Colitis Foundation of America (CCFA) Board of Trustees, the American Gastroenterological Association Council, the American Academy of Pediatrics and the editorial board for the Journal of Pediatric Gastroenterology and Nutrition.

As a result of her academic accomplishments, Oliva-Hemker was appointed chief of the Division of Pediatric Gastroenterology, Hepatology and Nutrition. While serving in this role, she tripled the number of faculty members and expanded the academic clinical practice. By 2011, Oliva-Hemker was promoted to the rank of Full professor at Johns Hopkins, becoming the first Hispanic woman and the third woman of color to be promoted to that title in the School of Medicine. In 2021, she was named Vice Dean for Faculty at the Johns Hopkins University School of Medicine.

Dr. Oliva-Hemker has consistently named among “America’s Top Doctors” by Castle Connolly Medical Ltd. and Marquis’ “Who’s Who in Medicine and Health Care.” She has repeatedly been selected a Baltimore “Top Doc” by peer physicians and was on the cover of Baltimore Magazine's 2013 Top Doc issue.

== Personal life ==
Oliva-Hemker and her husband Kevin Hemker have two sons together. In her free time, she likes to cook, read, watch sports, and play tennis.
