= Kazuhiro Hono =

Japanese materials scientist

- 宝野 和博
- Education: Tohoku University; Pennsylvania State University
- Known for: Materials science and Engineering, Magnetic Materials, Physical Metallurgy, Atom probe tomography
- Scientific career
- Fields: Materials science
- Workplaces: National Institute for Materials Science (NIMS); Tohoku University; University of Tsukuba

Kazuhiro Hono (Japanese: 宝野 和博; Hono Kazuhiro) is a Japanese materials scientist specializing in metallurgy, magnetic and spintronic materials. He has applied atom probe tomography and electron microscopy to study relationships between microstructure and properties in metallic materials, including light alloys, rare-earth magnet, rare-earth permanent magnets and magnetic recording media.

== Education and career ==
Hono received his B.S. and M.S. degrees in Materials Science from Tohoku University in 1982 and 1984. He earned a Ph.D. in Metals Science and Engineering from Pennsylvania State University in 1988. After a postdoctoral fellowship from Carnegie Mellon University, he returned to Tohoku University as a research associate in 1990.

In 1995, Hono joined the National Research Institute for Metals (now NIMS). He has also been a professor at the University of Tsukuba Graduate School of Pure and Applied Sciences and supervised over 30 Ph.D. students in his career from 1999 to 2022. He was appointed as President of NIMS on April 1, 2022.

== Research contributions ==
Hono's research primarily focuses on characterization of metallic nanostructures for metallurgy, alloy design, and magnetic materials. He has pioneered in such techniques atom probe tomography to understand microstructure-property relationship in materials, using which to advance high-performance permanent magnetic materials in addressing rare-earth resources crisis in Japan.

== Awards and recognition ==
Hono's is a Fellow of the Materials Research Society, the Japan Institute of Metals, and the International Field Emission Society. In 2024, he was awarded the Acta Materialia Gold Medal in recognition of his work in the application of atom probe tomography to materials science. In 2024, Hono was awarded Japan’s Medal with Purple Ribbon (紫綬褒章) for his contributions to materials engineering.
