= Anhui Polytechnic University =

Provincial public university in Wuhu, Anhui, China

- 安徽工程大学
- Other names: AHPU
- Former names: Anhui Mechanical University; Wuhu Mechanical School; Anhui University of Technology and Science
- Type: Public university
- Established: 1935
- President: Wang Shaowu
- Academic staff: 800
- Administrative staff: 1,200
- Students: 19,000
- Location: Wuhu, Anhui, China
- Campus: Urban area
- Colours
- Website: ahpu.edu.cn

Anhui Polytechnic University (AHPU; Chinese: 安徽工程大学; pinyin: Ānhuī gōngchéng dàxué) is a provincial public university in Wuhu, Anhui, China. It is affiliated with the Anhui Provincial Government.

The university provides programs in the fields of science and technology, engineering, management and economics.

== History ==
Anhui Polytechnic University (AHPU) is located in the national open city: Wuhu city in Anhui province, with an easy access to Nanjing (about 40 minutes by fast train) and Shanghai (about 2 and a half hours by fast train). AHPU is a provincial, multi-disciplinary university with strength in engineering and one of the universities for priority development in Anhui. The schooling can be traced back to 1935 when the Spanish Catholic Church founded Anhui Neisi Technical School, which, thereafter, renewed its name as Wuhu Electrical Motor Manufacture School, Wuhu Mechanical School, Anhui College of Mechanical & Electrical Engineering, Anhui University of Technology & Science and Anhui Polytechnic University since 2010.

AHPU covers an area of 140 hectares, with a total construction area over 500,000 square meters, a total asset for teaching and research equipment 258 million RMB and a collection of over 1.5 million books in the library. Its faculty totals approximately 1300, with over 1000 as full-time teachers, of which 85% have doctorate or master degrees. Besides, AHPU employs renowned scholars both at home and abroad as its guest professors, including academicians of Chinese Academy of Sciences and Chinese Academy of Engineering, and introduces some high-level talents, including "The Yangtze River Scholars", to be its leading scientists of disciplines. Currently, with disciplines covering engineering, science, humanities, management, economy, law and arts etc., AHPU comprises 14 schools, offering 74 undergraduate programs, among which 14 are national or provincial featured programs, 15 are national or provincial comprehensive reform programs and 12 are national or provincial "Excellent Talents Programs". AHPU runs the master programs in 12 major disciplines and 7 professional master programs, of which 5 are in engineering fields. Nowadays, AHPU is jointly constructing "School of international engineers" with Wuhu municipal government and thus initiates a new talent cultivation pattern characterized by a combination of "Industry, School, Research and Application" and an integrity of "Internationalization, Engineering, Industrialization and Diversity". AHPU has established partnership with about 20 renowned universities from USA, UK, France, Germany, Italy, South Korea, Thailand and Taiwan Region to carry out joint-education programs, talent cultivation and scientific researches.
