= Elsa Olivetti =

American materials scientist

Elsa A. Olivetti
- Known for: Olivetti’s research blends industrial ecology with materials science and engineering to improve and mitigate the environmental and economic impact of materials use.
- Awards: Paul Gray Award for Public Service (2020); MacVicar Faculty Fellowship (2021)
- Scientific career
- Institutions: Massachusetts Institute of Technology; University of Virginia
- Patrons: Massachusetts Institute of Technology
- Thesis: Composite cathodes for lithium rechargeable batteries (2007)

Elsa A. Olivetti is an American materials scientist who is the Esther and the Jerry McAfee (1940) Professor in Engineering at the Massachusetts Institute of Technology. Olivetti studies the environmental and economic sustainability of materials.

== Early life and education ==
Olivetti studied engineering science at the University of Virginia and graduated in 2000. She moved to Massachusetts Institute of Technology for graduate studies, where she investigated composite cathodes for lithium rechargeable batteries. In particular, Olivetti studied how nanoarchitectured electrode materials based on nanoscale vanadium oxide phases could improve batter performance.

== Research and career ==
Olivetti's research considers materials research and discovery. She looks to understand the impact of human-made materials using analytical models, as well as predicting the impact of novel materials on environments and economies. She has worked to help decision-makers understand the impact of materials substitution and recycling. Olivetti worked with Asics to develop innovative sustainable materials for running shoes.

Olivetti has pioneered materials science education courses, including the Climate and Sustainability Scholars Program. In 2021, she was awarded the MIT Bose Award for materials science education.

== Awards and honors ==
- 2017 Earll M. Murman Award for Excellence in Undergraduate Advising
- 2020 Paul Gray Award for Public Service
- 2021 MIT Bose Award
- 2021 MacVicar Faculty Fellow

== Selected publications ==
- Gaustad, Gabrielle; Olivetti, Elsa; Kirchain, Randolph (January 2012). "Improving aluminum recycling: A survey of sorting and impurity removal technologies". Resources, Conservation and Recycling. 58: 79–87. doi:10.1016/j.resconrec.2011.10.010. ISSN 0921-3449.
- Bocken, Nancy M. P.; Olivetti, Elsa A.; Cullen, Jonathan M.; Potting, José; Lifset, Reid (May 2017). "Taking the Circularity to the Next Level: A Special Issue on the Circular Economy". Journal of Industrial Ecology. 21 (3): 476–482. doi:10.1111/jiec.12606. ISSN 1088-1980. S2CID 157499596.
- Olivetti, Elsa A.; Ceder, Gerbrand; Gaustad, Gabrielle G.; Fu, Xinkai (October 2017). "Lithium-Ion Battery Supply Chain Considerations: Analysis of Potential Bottlenecks in Critical Metals". Joule. 1 (2): 229–243. doi:10.1016/j.joule.2017.08.019. ISSN 2542-4351. S2CID 73647268.
