= Tsu-Wei Chou =

Tsu-Wei Chou (born 1940) is an American materials scientist.

Chou was born in Shanghai in 1940. His family then moved to Taiwan to avoid the Chinese Civil War, and he obtained a bachelor's degree in civil engineering from the National Taiwan University in 1963. Chou then relocated to the United States to study materials science, completing a masters degree at Northwestern University in 1966, followed by a PhD from Stanford University in 1969. He began teaching at the University of Delaware in July 1969, and remained on the faculty for five decades, eventually being appointed the Unidel Pierre S. du Pont Chair of Engineering and receiving emeritus status in retirement. In 1998, Chou was elected fellow of the American Society of Mechanical Engineers, and elevated to honorary member of ASME in 2022.

Chou and his wife Mei-Sheng Lo raised three children.
