= Hemker Park & Zoo =

- Interactive map of Hemker Park & Zoo
- 45°40′19″N 94°40′3″W
- Date opened: 1977
- Location: Oak Township, Minnesota, United States
- No. of species: 51
- Website: hemkerzoo.com

The Hemker Park & Zoo is a seasonal, family owned zoo founded in 1977 in Freeport, Minnesota, United States. The zoo was founded by Mark and Joan Hemker.

== History ==
The Hemker Park and Zoo was started in 1977 by Mark and Joan Hemker in Freeport, Minnesota, when the couple acquired their first collection of waterfowl. It started out as the Hemker Game Farm. In 1980, the farm acquired its first pair of white-tail deer and a black bear. The zoo expanded in 1985 when it acquired a pronghorn antelope and a pair of reindeer. In 1992, they rebranded to the Hemker Wildlife Park and later that same year added six black-footed penguins to their collection. In 1994, the Hemker Wildlife Park opened to the public for the first time. The turn of the century brought new exhibits to the Hemker Wildlife Park such as the African Safari. After Mark Hemker's death in 2006, the family continued operations to honor his memory. In 2008, Hemker Wildlife Park became the Hemker Park & Zoo and added a new picnic area and farm petting zoo. In 2010, the penguins returned and in 2012, the zoo added two New Guinea singing dogs - Gus and Lucy.

== Animals ==
Mammals

- Reindeer
- Bactrian camel
- Dromedary camel
- Giraffe
- Eastern grey kangaroo
- Alpine ibex
- Bighorn sheep
- Dall sheep
- Mountain goat
- Sichuan takin
- Grant's zebra
- Indian rhinoceros
- Addra gazelle
- Gerenuk
- Lesser kudu
- Nyala
- Sitatunga
- Pronghorn
- Markhor
- Transcaspian urial
- West Caucasian tur
- Yak
- Alpaca
- Crested porcupine
- White-lipped deer
- Black-handed spider monkey
- Black-and-white ruffed lemur
- Ring-tailed lemur
- Tufted capuchin
- Common marmoset
- Cotton-top tamarin
- Colombian white-faced capuchin
- Buff-cheeked gibbon
- Vervet monkey
- Wolf's mona monkey
- Bobcat
- Canada lynx
- North American river otter
- Red panda

Reptiles

- African spurred tortoise
- Leopard tortoise
- Boa constrictor
- Bearded dragon
- Leopard gecko
- Mexican black kingsnake
- Corn snake
- Burmese python

Birds

- African penguin
- Blue and gold macaw
- Military macaw
- Double yellow head amazon
- Budgerigar
- Chilean flamingo
- American flamingo
- Red-crowned crane
- Black swan
- Black-necked swan
- Trumpeter swan
- Peafowl
- Great curassow
- Helmeted curassow
- Secretarybird
- Great horned owl
- White-naped crane
- American white ibis
- Scarlet ibis
- Great hornbill
- Silvery-cheeked hornbill
- Southern ground hornbill
- and a variety of waterfowl species

Other

- Green tree frog
- Rose hair tarantula

== Experiences ==
Other experiences offered by the zoo include educational tours, reindeer sleigh rides, picnics, birthday parties, wagon rides, and a mobile petting zoo. Also offered by the zoo is the Zoo Keeper Experience Day. For this, visitors get to spend a day with one of the zoo keepers and help with feeding, enrichment programs, educational programs, and cleaning.

== See also ==
- Minnesota Zoo
- Como Zoo and Conservatory
- Zollman Zoo
- Como Zoo, Saint Paul, Minnesota
