= Alexis Lewis =

American inventor and public speaker

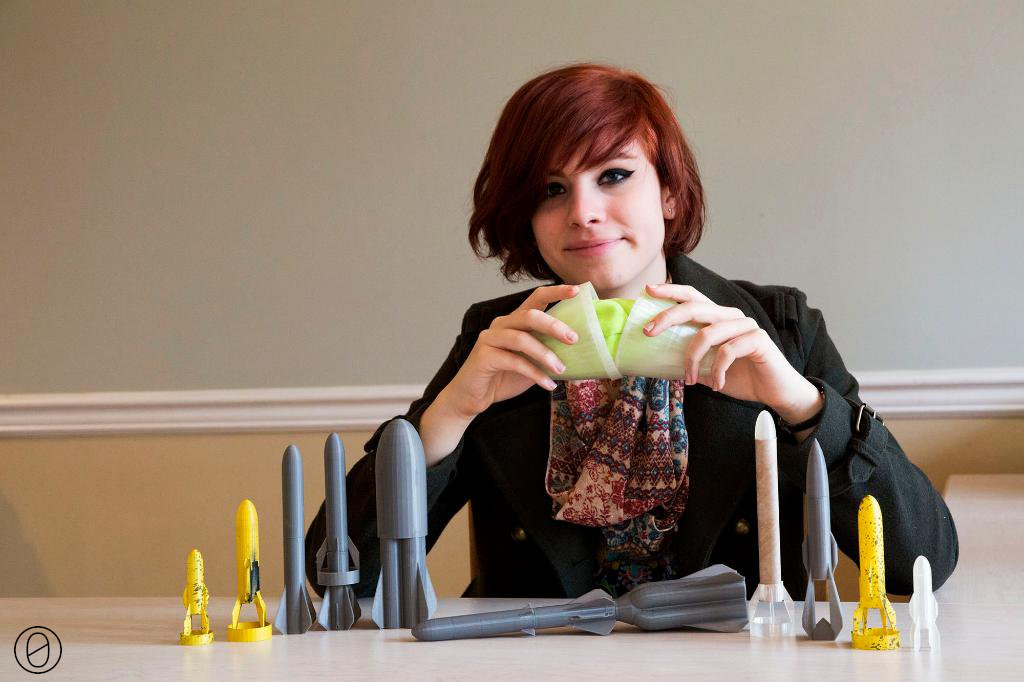
- Lewis in 2016
- Born: 1999 (age 26–27)
- Education: University of North Carolina
- Occupations: Futurist; inventor; public speaker; artist; writer
- Website: www.alexislewisinventor.me

Alexis Lewis is an American inventor and public speaker. She is best known for her advocacy for invention education and her humanitarian inventions. She is known to have given talks at the White House, Smithsonian, SXSW, National Maker Faire, the 2018 Social Innovation Summit, as well as at TEDx events. Lewis also gained repeat standing as a finalist or winner in national and international science and invention fairs, including the 2012 Broadcom MASTERS Challenge. In the course of the Spark!Lab Invent It Challenge, Lewis won pro-bono patent counsel, and holds a patent on the "Rescue Travois", granted 2015 and has one pending, on the "Emergency Mask Pod".

Additionally, in 2019, Lewis served on the selection committee of Tool Foundry, a science tools accelerator, and in 2013, she served as a representative of LEGO Education at the 2013 FIRST World Championship.

== Documentaries ==
Lewis has been featured in two mini-documentaries:

- 2015 Smithsonian mini-documentary "Teen Inventor Alexis Lewis on Youth and the Innovative Spirit"
- 2017 The Stem 10, a series of mini-documentaries featuring Alexis Lewis and others

== Advisory positions ==
- Tool Foundry Accelerator Selection Committee
- Lifeboat Foundation
  - Education Board
  - Engineering Board
  - Futurists Board
  - Media & Arts Board
  - Space Settlement Board

== Speaking engagements ==
- TEDxAshburn, 2014
- Smithsonian-USPTO Innovation Family Festival, 2015
- Obama-White House address: National Week of Making, 2015
- TEDxUNC 2015
- South By Southwest (SXSW), 2017
- Social Innovation Summit, 2018

== Awards and recognition ==
- 2012 Broadcom MASTERS 1st in Engineering
- 2012 Spark!Lab Invent It Challenge winner
- 2012 Finalist in Discovery Education 3M Young Scientist Challenge
- 2013 Iron Man 3 Inventor and Innovator Fair winner
- 2014 Spark!Lab Invent It Challenge winner
- 2014 Big Hero 6 Inventor and Innovator Fair winner
- 2016 Scholastic Gold Key in Poetry
