= Anthony Rollett =

British materials scientist and engineer

- Education: Cambridge University (MA); Drexel University (PhD)
- Scientific career
- Fields: Computational materials science
- Workplaces: Carnegie Mellon University

Anthony Rollett is a British materials scientist and engineer currently at Carnegie Mellon University and a Fellow of the Institute of Physics. His research interests are within computational materials science, specifically mesoscale methods and microstructure evolution.

== Selected publications ==
- "One crystal out of many", Anthony Rollett, Science 362 (6418), 996-997 (2018)
- "Simulation of plastic deformation in Ti-5553 alloy using a self-consistent viscoplastic model", Sudipto Mandal, Brian T. Gockel, Shanoob Balachandran, Dipankar Banerjee, Anthony D. Rollett, International Journal of Plasticity, 94, 57-73 (2017)
- “Simulation Domain Size Requirements for Elastic Response of 3D Polycrystalline Materials”, Tugce Ozturk, Clayton Stein, Reeju Pokharel, Christopher Hefferan, Harris Tucker, Sushant Jha, Reji John, Ricardo A. Lebensohn, Peter Kenesei, Robert M. Suter, Anthony D. Rollett, Modelling and Simulation in Materials Science and Engineering (2015)
- "Tutorial: Consistent representations of and conversions between 3D rotations" by Rowenhorst, D., Rollett, A.D., Rohrer, G.S., Groeber, M., Jackson, M., Konijnberg, P., De Graef, M., Modelling and Simulation in Materials Science and Engineering (2015)
- “Evolution of texture and microstructure in deformed and annealed Copper-Iron multilayer” by K.S. Suresh, Anthony Rollett, and Satyam Suwas, Metallurgical and Materials Transactions A (2015)
- “Annealing Twins in Nickel Nucleate at Triple Lines During Grain Growth”, B. Lin, Y. Jin, C.M. Hefferan, S.F. Li, J. Lind, R.M. Suter, M. Bernacki, N. Bozzolo, A.D. Rollett, G.S. Rohrer, Acta Materialia, 99, 63-68 (2015)
- “Abnormal Grain Growth in the Potts Model Incorporating Grain Boundary Complexions that Increase the Mobility of Individual Boundaries”, W.E. Frazier, G.S. Rohrer, and A.D. Rollett, Acta Materialia, 96, 390–398 (2015)
- “Simulation of Residual Stress and Elastic Energy Density in Thermal Barrier Coatings Using Fast Fourier Transforms”, S.P. Donegan and A.D. Rollett, Acta Materialia, 96, 212–228 (2015)
- "Evaluating the Effect of Processing Parameters on Porosity in Electron Beam Melted Ti-6Al-4V via Synchrotron X-ray Microtomography", Ross Cunningham, Sneha P. Narra, Jack Beuth, and A.D. Rollet, Journal of Minerals, Metals and Materials (2015)
