= Metallurgical and Materials Transactions =

- Discipline: Metallurgy, materials science
- Language: English
- Edited by: Tresa M. Pollock

Publication details
- Publisher: Springer Science+Business Media
- Impact factor: 3.0 (A), 3.3 (B) (2025)

Standard abbreviations
- ISO 4: Metall. Mater. Trans.

Indexing
- Section A
- ISSN: 1073-5623
- Section B
- ISSN: 1073-5615

Links
- Journal homepage; Section A; Section B

Metallurgical and Materials Transactions is a peer-reviewed scientific journal published in three sections (A, B, and E) covering metallurgy and materials science. The journals are jointly published by The Minerals, Metals & Materials Society and ASM International.

== Metallurgical and Materials Transactions A ==
This monthly section focuses on physical metallurgy and materials science, and publishes international scientific contributions on all aspects of physical metallurgy and materials science, with a special emphasis on relationships among the processing, structure, and properties of materials.

== Metallurgical and Materials Transactions B ==
This bimonthly section is uniquely focused on process metallurgy and materials processing science. Coverage emphasizes the theoretical and engineering aspects of the processing of metals and other materials, including studies of electro- and physical chemistry, mass transport, modeling, and related computer applications.
