= Diran Apelian =

American materials scientist

Diran Apelian (born in Cairo, Egypt, in October 1945) is an American materials scientist, educator and a member of the National Academy of Engineering. He currently serves as a Distinguished Professor at University of California, Irvine's Samueli School of Engineering. He is also Chief Strategy Officer and leads the Advanced Casting Research Center. Earlier in his career, he served as Provost at Worcester Polytechnic Institute, where he established the Metal Processing Institute.

== Research ==
Apelian's research has spanned materials processing, with sustained contributions to solidification science, casting technology, and—more recently—materials recovery and recycling. According to his UC Irvine faculty profile, his research areas include solidification processing, aluminum metallurgy, clean metal and melt refining, plasma processing and spray forming, powder metallurgy, nanostructured materials, semi-solid processing, thermal processing, and resource recovery and recycling.

Diran Apelian
- Born: October 28, 1945 (age 80); Cairo, Egypt
- Education: Drexel University (BS, 1968); Massachusetts Institute of Technology (ScD, 1972)
- Known for: Spray forming; Aluminum recycling and sustainable metallurgy
- Awards: National Academy of Engineering (2009); Academia Europaea (2007); Foreign member, Chinese Academy of Sciences (2021)
- Scientific career
- Fields: Materials science; Metallurgy
- Workplaces: University of California, Irvine; Worcester Polytechnic Institute; Drexel University
