= Emmanuel Santos =

Filipino photographer (born 1957)

Emmanuel Santos (born 1957 in the Philippines) is a Melbourne, Australia-based documentary and art photographer. While still living in the Philippines, he was a photographer for the United Nations High Commissioner for Refugees . After moving to Australia in 1982, he worked briefly as a folk singer.

His creative work since the late 1980s has focused on the Jewish Diaspora, which he has photographed throughout the world. Santos' photographs are included in a number of museum collections, including the Bibliothèque nationale de France, Jewish Museum of Australia, State Library of Victoria, National Gallery of Victoria, Victorian Arts Centre, Immigration Museum (Melbourne), Jewish Holocaust Centre, and the National Library of Australia. Santos has held solo exhibitions throughout the world. He is also curator at Obscura Gallery in St Kilda, Melbourne, which specialises in fine art and documentary photography.
