= The Curb (website) =

Australian film website

The Curb is an Australian website focused on Australian films. It is based in Perth, Western Australia.

It was founded in 2018 and is run by film enthusiast and reviewer Andrew F. Peirce. He cites one of his reasons for establishing the website was that there was little coverage of Australian films in the media after David Stratton and Margaret Pomeranz disappeared from Australian television screens (when At the Movies finished in 2014). Peirce aims to draw attention to little-known films that struggle to get a cinema release, and by including reviews, articles, and interviews, to promote Australian filmmakers. The website hosts articles and reviewers by other writers, as well as his own. Another aim is to raise the profile of Australian reviews of Australian films, which are often overlooked by sites such as Rotten Tomatoes in favour of American sources such as Hollywood Reporter or Indiewire.

The Curb's interviews are often cited on other film industry-related websites, including Rotten Tomatoes. Pop culture website Soda & Telepaths described The Curb in 2021 as a "mainstay on independent reporting on the Australian film industry".

In March 2022 the website published The Australian Film Yearbook – 2021 Edition, covering films and events in the film industry of the preceding year. It also regularly releases podcasts.

There is also a podcast aligned to the website and run by Peirce. It was created on 10 August 2014 by Auscast Network and had undergone various name changes before being relaunched as The Curb in September 2018.
