= Materials genome =

Materials genome is an analogy to genomes in biology, but in a conceptual sense: the many important phases, defects, and processes that make up engineered materials are the "genome" of materials science. The Materials Genome Initiative (MGI) is a federal, multi-agency effort to design, manufacture, and deploy materials and materials-based technologies significantly faster and cheaper than ever before. The MGI partially references the Human Genome Project, but only conceptually, and is a broader and less targeted effort.

== History ==
The name "materials genome" was coined in December 2002 by Dr. Zi-Kui Liu who incorporated the company MaterialsGenome, Inc. in Pennsylvania, USA, and filed the trademark protection on March 5, 2004 (78512752). The Certificate of Registration (Reg. No. 4,224,035) was issued by the Patent and Trademark office on October 16, 2012.

In 2005, Zi-Kui Liu and Pierre Villars jointly crafted a proposal on "Materials Genome Foundation" when they met in Switzerland. In January 2006, they presented the proposal to a panel organized by ASM International.

In 2008, United States Automotive Materials Partnership (USAMP) supported by the United States Department of Energy funded a smaller version of the concept of "Materials Genome Foundation", which resulted in the development of the software package ESPEI.

In June 2011, the name "materials genome" was used in the United States National Science and Technology Council "Materials Genome Initiative" in consent with MaterialsGenome, Inc.

In 2014, Liu published an article to reflect "Perspective on Materials Genome" in English, and in Chinese

In early 2015, Chenxi Qian, Todd Siler and Geoffrey Ozin jointly published a paper in Small, discussing about the possibilities and limitations of a nanomaterials genome, expanding concept of the materials genome by incorporating the important parameters of nanomaterials such as size and shape information into the roadmap.

In May 2016, a group led by Sorelle A. Friedler, Joshua Schrier and Alexander J. Norquist claimed the first machine-learning-assisted materials discovery, as an example of humanity's early attempts to design and develop materials via data-driven approaches proposed by the Materials Genome Initiative.

In May 2017, progress on the Materials Genome Initiative was reviewed in 2017 at a workshop sponsored by NSF and future directions were identified.
