= Tresa Pollock =

American materials scientist

Tresa Pollock NAE, GASL
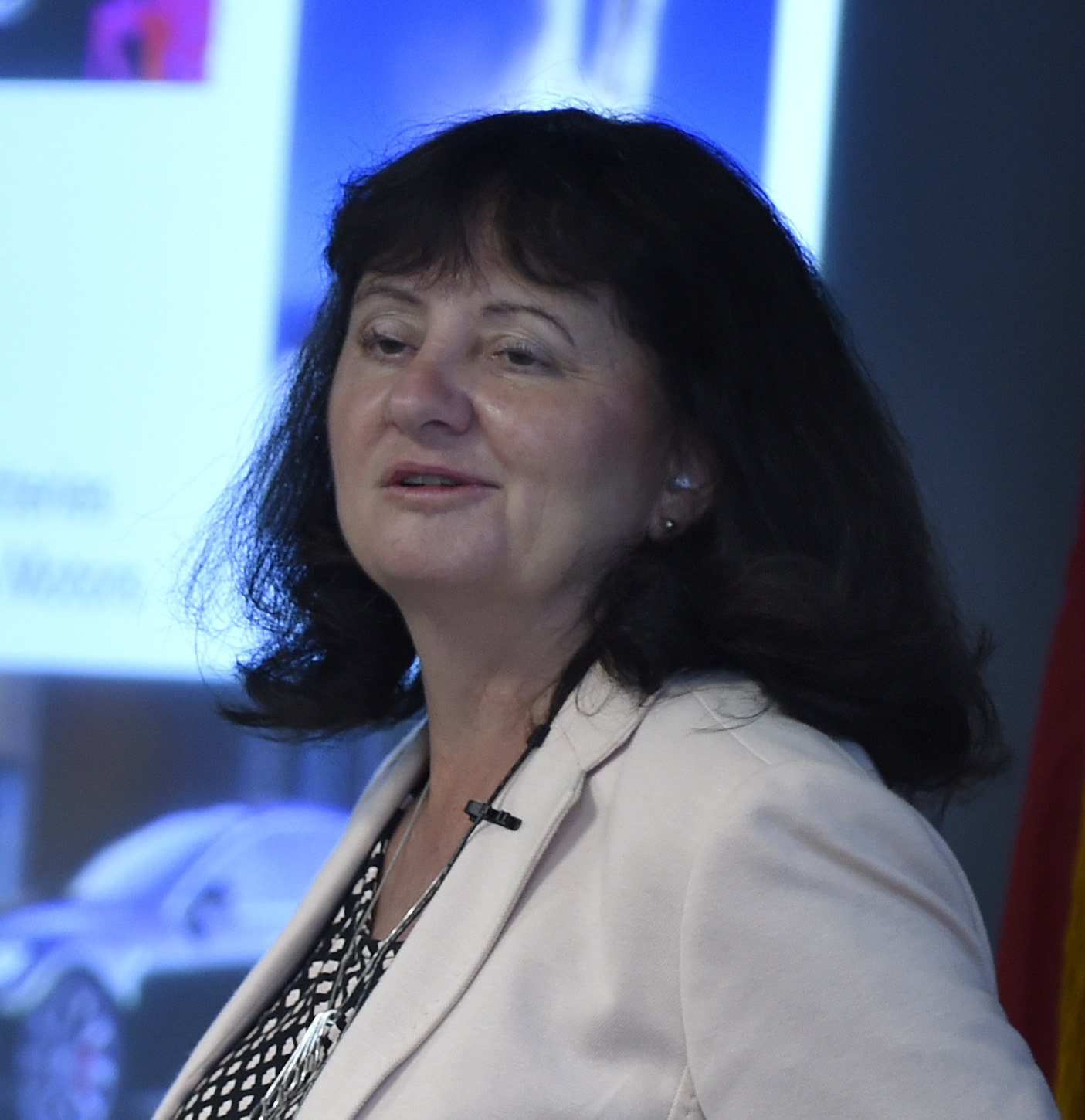
- Pollock in 2016
- Born: Tresa M. Pollock
- Education: Massachusetts Institute of Technology (PhD) Purdue University (B.S.)
- Scientific career
- Fields: Metallurgy; Microstructural Characterisation; Materials science Nickel-based superalloys
- Workplaces: University of California, Santa Barbara
- Doctoral advisor: Ali Argon
- Website: https://materials.ucsb.edu/people/faculty/tresa-pollock

Tresa M. Pollock is ALCOA Distinguished Professor of Materials at the Department of Materials, University of California, Santa Barbara. Pollock is internationally recognised in the development of new materials systems, including alloys, 3D characterisation of structure and properties, and development of integrated computation materials engineering.

Pollock was elected a member of the US National Academy of Engineering in 2005 for contributions to our understanding of the processing and performance of advanced metallic materials. She is also a fellow of the Materials, Minerals and Mining Society.

== Education ==
Pollock grew up in Ohio, near the Wright Patterson Air Force Base and was inspired to study Engineering by the experimental high tech aircraft at the base, as well as Amelia Earhart. This motivated her to enroll at Purdue University as a first generation college student. During her studies, Pollock was a co-op student with Allison Gas Turbine (now Rolls-Royce) in Indianapolis. She completed her Bachelor of Science in Metallurgical Engineering in 1984. For her doctoral studies, she worked with Ali S. Argon at the Massachusetts Institute of Technology and completed her PhD in Materials Science in 1989.

== Research and career ==
After her studies, Pollock worked at General Electric Aircraft Engines as a Materials Research Engineer from 1989 to 1991 and developed high temperature alloys for aircraft turbine engines. In 1991, she moved to Carnegie Mellon University as a Professor. During this time, she was also a Guest Scientist at General Electric. In 2000, Pollock moved to University of Michigan and took up the L.H and F.E. Van Vlack Professorship in Materials Science and Engineering. In 2010, Pollock moved to University of California, Santa Barbara where she presently works as a Distinguished Professor of Materials and the Alcoa Chair. At the University of California at Santa Barbara, Pollock Directs the Microscopy and Microanalysis Facility. Pollock is a pioneer in the use of femtosecond lasers for 3D tomography of materials. Pollock also acts as Chair of the Scientific Advisory Board for MAPP (a UK consortium for advanced materials processing).

== Awards and recognition ==
- 1992: Young Investigator Award, National Science Foundation
- 1995: ASM Bradley Stoughton Award
- 1997: Outstanding Materials Engineering, Purdue University, USA
- 1997-2015: Associate Editor, Metallurgical and Materials Transactions Journals
- 1999: ASM Silver Medal Research Award
- 2005: Member, Chinese Academy of Sciences
- 2005: Lee Husn Award, Chinese Academy of Sciences
- 2005: TSM Magnesium Technology Award
- 2005: Member, US-National Academy of Engineering
- 2005-2006: President of the Minerals, Metals and Materials Society.
- 2007: ASM Jeffries Lecture
- 2009: AIME Raymond Award
- 2005: Elected to the U.S. National Academy of Engineering
- 2009: Fellow of TMS and ASM International
- 2011: TMS Structural Materials Distinguished Service Award
- 2012: ASM International Gold Medal
- 2013: TMS-ASM Joint Distinguished Lectureship in Materials and Society
- 2015: Acta Materialia Holloman Award in Materials and Society
- 2015: Member, German National Academy of Sciences Leopoldina
- 2016: Principal Editor of Metallurgical and Materials Transactions
- 2018: Morris Cohen Award
- 2018: AIME Honorary membership
- 2018: Alexander Scott Distinguished Service Award
- 2019: AIME Champion H. Mathewson Award
- 2021: Institute of Metals/Robert Franklin Mehl Award
