= Acta Materialia =

- Discipline: Materials science
- Language: English
- Edited by: Gregory S. Rohrer

Publication details
- Former names: Acta Metallurgica, Acta Metallurgica et Materialia
- History: 1953–present
- Publisher: Elsevier, on behalf of Acta Materialia Inc.
- Frequency: 20/year
- Impact factor: 10.7 (2025)

Standard abbreviations
- ISO 4: Acta Mater.

Indexing
- CODEN: AMATEB
- ISSN: 1359-6454 (print); 1873-2453 (web)
- LCCN: 96643329
- OCLC no.: 473236745

Links
- Journal homepage; Online archive; Nanostructured Materials archive

Acta Materialia is a peer-reviewed scientific journal published twenty times per year by Elsevier on behalf of Acta Materialia Inc. The editor-in-chief is Gregory S. Rohrer. The journal covers research on all aspects of materials science and publishes original papers and commissioned reviews called Overviews.

== History ==
The journal was established in 1953 as Acta Metallurgica and renamed to Acta Metallurgica et Materialia in 1990, before obtaining its current name in 1996. Since 1956, it was published by Pergamon Press, with the imprint being retained for some time after the acquisition by Elsevier. It incorporates Nanostructured Materials that was published independently from 1992 to 1999. Scripta Materialia was established in 1967 as a companion journal, publishing rapid communications as well as opinion articles called Viewpoints.

== Abstracting and indexing ==
The journal is abstracted and indexed in:

- Applied Mechanics Reviews
- Cambridge Scientific Abstracts
- Chemical Abstracts
- Current Contents/Engineering, Computing & Technology
- Current Contents/Physical, Chemical & Earth Sciences
- Engineering Index
- Inspec
- Materials Science Citation Index
- PASCAL
- Science Citation Index Expanded
- Scopus

According to the Journal Citation Reports, the journal has a 2025 impact factor of 10.7.

== See also ==
- Physical metallurgy
