= Scripta Materialia =

- Discipline: Materials science
- Language: English
- Edited by: Gregory S. Rohrer

Publication details
- Former name(s): Scripta Metallurgica, Scripta Metallurgica et Materialia
- History: 1967–present
- Publisher: Elsevier on behalf of Acta Materialia Inc.
- Frequency: Biweekly
- Impact factor: 5.611 (2020)

Standard abbreviations
- ISO 4: Scr. Mater.

Indexing
- CODEN: SCMAF7
- ISSN: 1359-6462
- LCCN: 96660540
- OCLC no.: 39224621

Links
- Journal homepage; Online access

Scripta Materialia is a peer-reviewed scientific journal. It is the "letters" section of Acta Materialia and covers novel properties, or substantially improved properties of materials. Specific materials discussed are metals, ceramics and semiconductors at all length scales, and published research endeavors explore the functional or mechanical behavior of these materials. Articles tend to focus on the materials science and engineering aspects of discovery, characterization, development (including advances), structure, chemistry, theory, experiment, modeling, simulation, physics processes (thermodynamics, mechanics, etc.), synthesis, processing (production), mechanisms, and control.

The journal also publishes comments on papers published in both Acta Materialia and Scripta Materialia and "Viewpoint Sets", which are sets of short articles invited by guest editors. The editor-in-chief is Gregory S. Rohrer, who also edits Acta Materialia.

== History ==
The journal was established in 1967 as Scripta Metallurgica. It was renamed Scripta Metallurgica et Materialia in 1990, finally obtaining its current name in 1996.

== Abstracting and indexing ==
The journal is abstracted and indexed in:

- BIOSIS Previews
- Cambridge Scientific Abstracts
- Current Contents/Physical, Chemical & Earth Sciences
- Current Contents /Engineering, Computing & Technology
- Energy Database
- Energy Research Abstracts
- Engineering Index
- Internationale Bibliographie der Zeitschriftenliteratur
- MSCI
- Metals Abstracts
- Science Citation Index
- Scopus
- World Aluminum Abstracts

According to the Journal Citation Reports, the journal has a 2020 impact factor of 5.611.
