= List of University of Wisconsin–Milwaukee people =

This is a list of people who attended, or taught at, the University of Wisconsin–Milwaukee, including those who attended Milwaukee State Normal School, Wisconsin State Teacher’s College, Wisconsin State College–Milwaukee and the University of Wisconsin-Extension Center in Milwaukee:

== Notable alumni ==
=== Academics ===
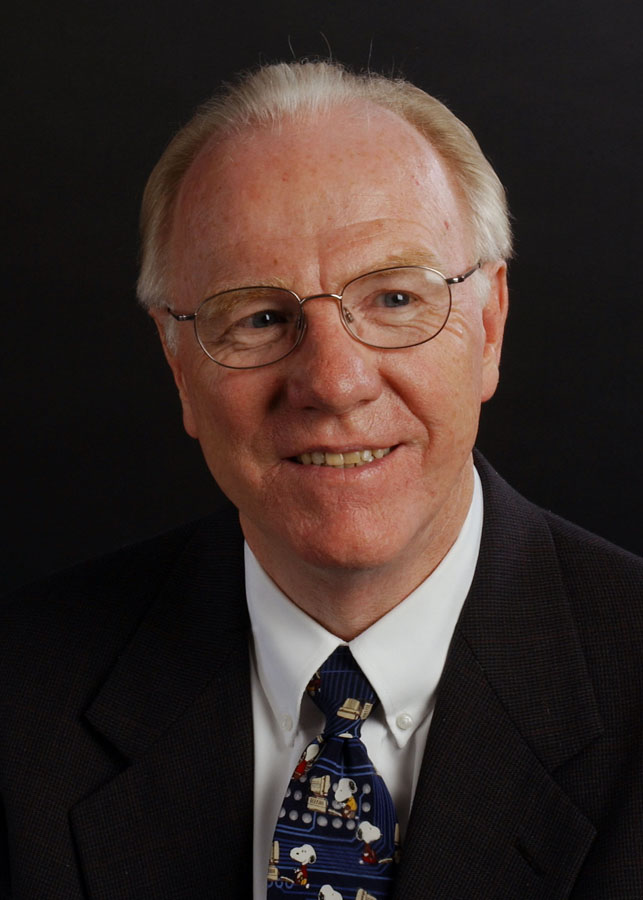
Larry N. Vanderhoef, chancellor of University of California, Davis

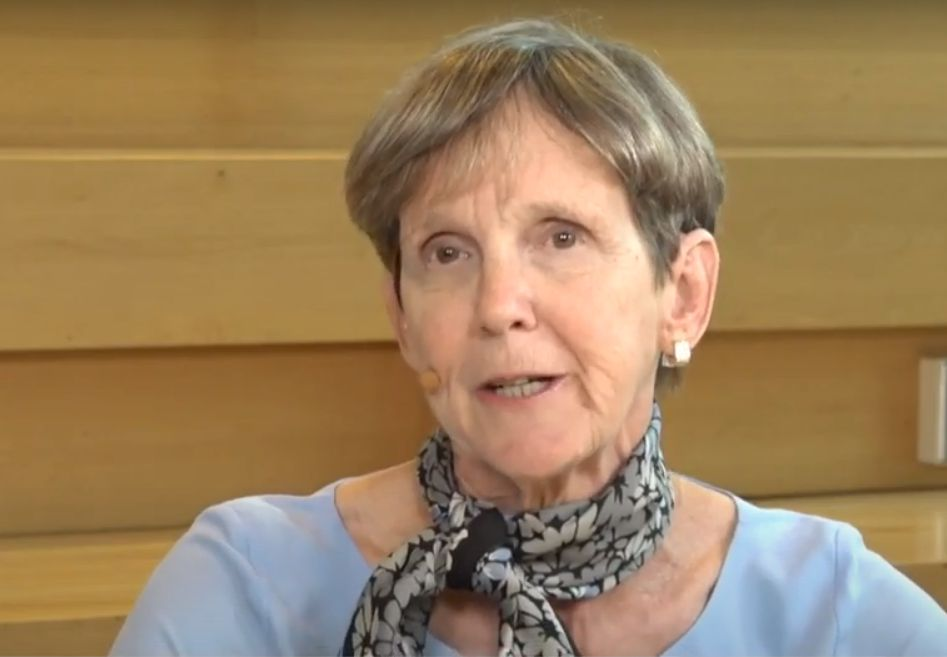
Jeanne W. Ross, director of MIT Center for Information Systems Research, founding editor of MIS Quarterly Executive, fellow of the Association for Information Systems

- George R. Blumenthal (B.S. Physics), astrophysicist, 10th chancellor of University of California, Santa Cruz
- Robert R. Caldwell (1992 Ph.D. Physics), professor at Dartmouth College, Fellow of the American Association for the Advancement of Science, Fellow of the American Physical Society
- Juan Carlos Campuzano (1978 Ph.D. Physics), fellow of American Physical Society, 2011 Buckley Prize winner,Argonne distinguished fellow
- Carlos Castillo-Chavez (1977 MS Mathematics), Regents and Joaquin Bustoz Jr. Professor at Arizona State University, fellow of American Mathematical Society
- Alok R. Chaturvedi (1989 Ph.D. MIS), professor of MIS at Purdue University, founder and director of Krannert School of Management SEAS Laboratory
- Jodi Cooley (1997 BS Math and Physics), Fellow of the American Association for the Advancement of Science, Fellow of the American Physical Society
- James Elsner (1988 Ph.D.), Earl and Sophia Shaw Professor of Geography at Florida State University
- Keith Hamm (1977 PhD Political Science), Edwards Professor of Political Science at Rice University
- Pamela E. Harris (PhD Math), inaugural class of Karen EDGE Fellows, Fellow of the American Mathematical Society
- William D. Haseman (MBA in MIS), Wisconsin Distinguished Professor of MIS at University of Wisconsin–Milwaukee
- Gary Hoover (1993 B.A. economics), director of the Murphy Institute at Tulane University
- Timothy P. Johnson (MA Political science), Fellow of the American Statistical Association
- George L. Kelling (M.S.W.), professor of criminal justice at Rutgers University, senior fellow at the Manhattan Institute for Policy Research, and fellow at the Kennedy School of Government at Harvard University
- Jack Kilby (1950 M.S. Electronic Engineering), Nobel Prize Laureate in Physics 2000, inventor of the integrated circuit
- Justin Marlowe (2004 PhD Political Science), Director of the Center for Municipal Finance, University of Illinois at Chicago, fellow of the National Academy of Public Administration
- Laura Mersini-Houghton (2000 PhD Physics), theoretical physicist-cosmologist and professor at the University of North Carolina at Chapel Hill
- Prakash Panangaden (PhD), computer scientist, Fellow of the Royal Society of Canada, Fellow of the Royal Society
- Marilyn Rantz (1992 Ph.D. Nursing), Living Legend of the American Academy of Nursing 2020
- Havidan Rodriguez (1986 MA Sociology), sociologist, 20th president of the University at Albany, SUNY
- Jeanne W. Ross (PhD MIS), director of MIT Sloan School's MIT Center for Information Systems Research, founding editor of MIS Quarterly Executive, Fellow of the Association for Information Systems
- Jean Schwarzbauer (BS Chemistry), Eugene Higgins Professor of Molecular Biology at Princeton University
- Eugenie Scott (BS, MS), physical anthropologist, executive director of the National Center for Science Education
- Robert M. Stein (1977 PhD), Lena Gohlman Fox Professor of Political Science at Rice University, former Dean of Rice University School of Social Sciences
- Larry N. Vanderhoef (M.S. Biology), 5th chancellor of University of California, Davis
- Madeline Wade (2015 PhD Physics), Fellow of the American Physical Society
- Wayne A. Wiegand (1970 MA History), library and information scientist, the "dean of American library historians"

=== Architecture and urban planning ===
- Will Bruder (BA Fine Art), architect, Fellow of the American Institute of Architects
- Andres Mignucci (1979 BS Arch), architect and urbanist, Fellow of the American Institute of Architects
- Thomas Vonier (1974, M.Arch.), Fellow of the American Institute of Architects, RIBA, founding president of the Continental Europe chapter of American Institute of Architects, president of the International Union of Architects

=== Business ===
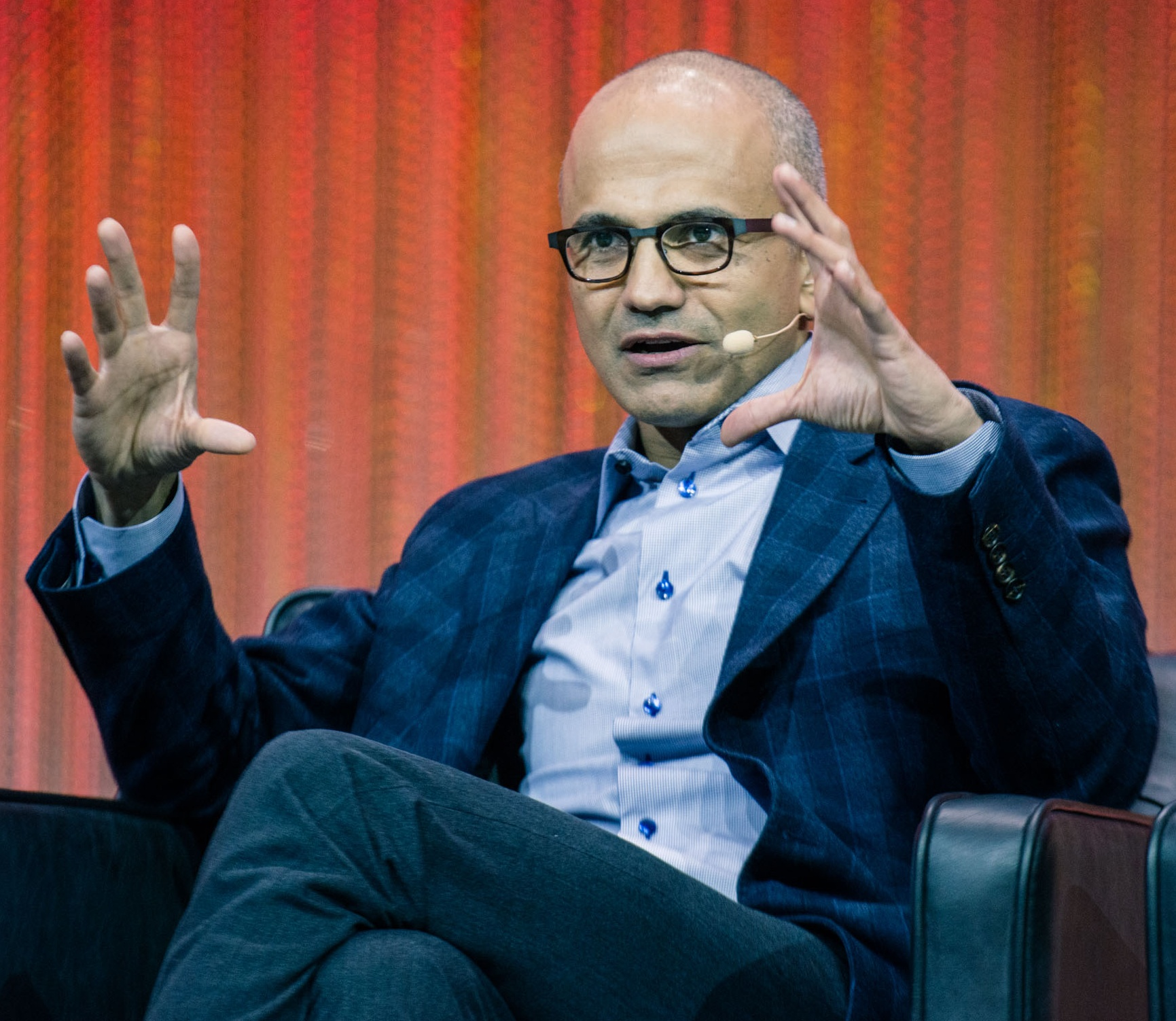
Satya Nadella, CEO of Microsoft Corporation

- Steven Burd (1973 MA Economics), retired president and CEO of Safeway Inc.
- Steven Davis (1980 BA Business), CEO of Bob Evans Restaurants; former president of Long John Silver's and A&W Restaurants
- Roger Fitzsimonds (1960 BA Business, '71 MBA Finance), retired chairman and CEO, Firstar Corp (now U.S. Bank)
- Dennis R. Glass (1971 BA Business, '73 MBA), president and CEO of Lincoln National Corporation
- Gale E. Klappa (1972 BBA Communication), chairman, president and CEO of Wisconsin Energy Corporation
- Dennis J. Kuester (1966 BBA), former chairman and CEO of Marshall & Ilsley Corporation; member of the Federal Reserve Advisory Council
- William H. Lacy Jr. (1968, BBA), former president and chief executive officer, MGIC Investment Corp.
- Satya Nadella (1990 MS Computer Science), CEO of Microsoft
- Keith Nosbusch (MBA), president and CEO of Rockwell Automation, formerly Rockwell International
- Richard Notebaert (1983, MBA), former chairman and CEO, Qwest Communications International, Inc., and Ameritech
- Jack F. Reichert (1957), former president of Brunswick Corp.
- James L. Ziemer (1975 BBA, 1986 EMBA), former president and CEO of Harley-Davidson, Inc.
- Edward J. Zore (1968 BS Economics, 1970 MS Economics), president and CEO of Northwestern Mutual

=== Fine arts and pop culture ===
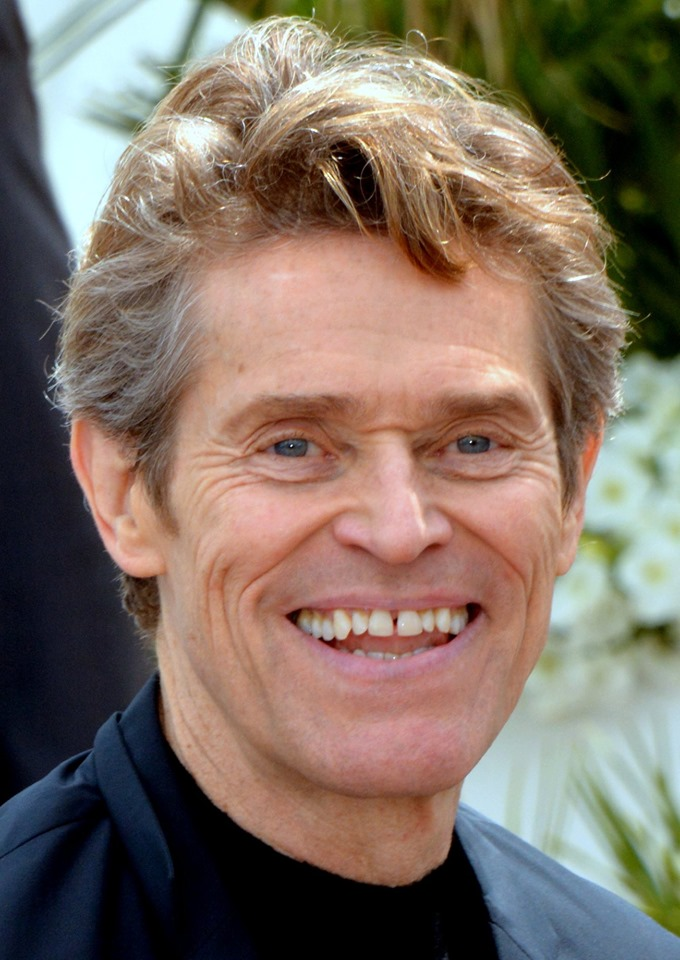
Willem Dafoe, actor

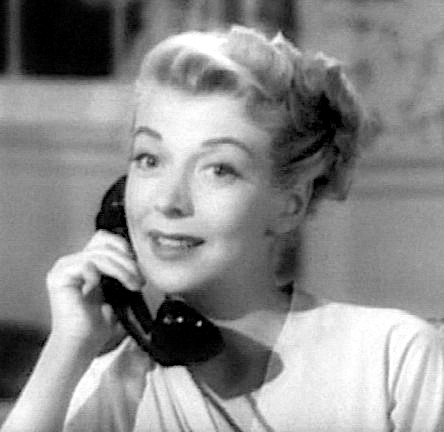
Pamela Britton, Broadway, film and television actress

==== Film, television and performing arts ====
- Pamela Britton, Broadway, film and television actress (D.O.A.; My Favorite Martian)
- Frank Caliendo (1996 BA, Mass Communication-Broadcast Journalism), comedian
- Chukwudi Iwuji, actor
- Willem Dafoe (1974), actor
- Angna Enters, dancer, mime, painter, writer, novelist and playwright
- Trixie Mattel (2012 BFA, Music, Inter-Arts), drag queen, singer-songwriter, comedian and television personality
- Jim Rygiel (1977 BFA, Painting and Drawing), Oscar winner of digital effects for Lord of the Rings
- Chris M. Smith (1999 MFA, Film), filmmaker and founder of Bluemark Production and ZeroTV.com

==== Music ====
- Naima Adedapo (2007 BFA, Dance), American Idol finalist
- Victor DeLorenzo, drummer for Violent Femmes
- Frederick Hemke (1961 BS, Music Education), saxophonist
- Guy Hoffman (1978 BFA, Art), drummer and vocalist, former Violent Femmes and BoDeans member
- Andy Hurley (2014 BA, Committee Interdiciplinary), drummer for Fall Out Boy
- Jerome Kitzke (1978 BFA, Music), composer
- Willie Pickens (1958 BS Music Education), jazz pianist, composer, arranger, and educator
- Jessica Suchy-Pilalis, harpist, Byzantine singer and composer

==== Visual arts ====
- Michelle Grabner (1984 BFA Art, 1987 MA Art History), painter
- Sky Hopinka (MA) Guggenheim Fellowship, MacArthur Fellowship recipient
- Hanna Jubran (1980 BFA Art, 1983 MFA Sculpture), sculptor
- Denis Kitchen (1968 BS, Mass Communications-Journalism), underground comics artist, publisher, author, founder of the Comic Book Legal Defense Fund
- Dennis Kois (1995, BA), museum designer (Metropolitan Museum of Art, Smithsonian); Director, DeCordova Museum and Sculpture Park, Boston, MA
- David Lenz (1963 BA, Art), painter
- Jan Serr (1968 MFA, Art), visual artist
- Donald George Vogl (1958 MS, Art Education), artist, retired professor of art at University of Notre Dame

=== Journalism and public media ===
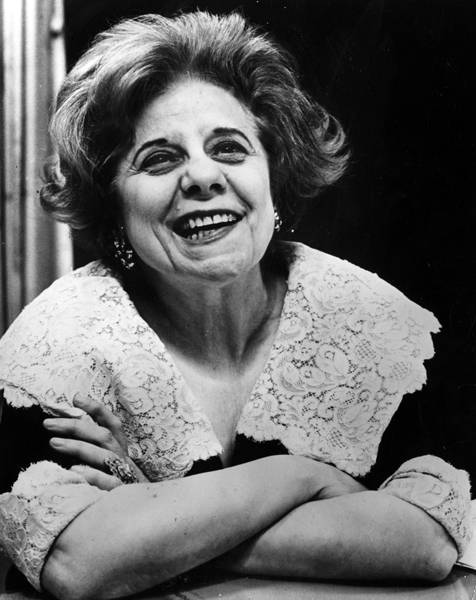
Dorothy Fuldheim, journalist and anchor, "First Lady of television news"

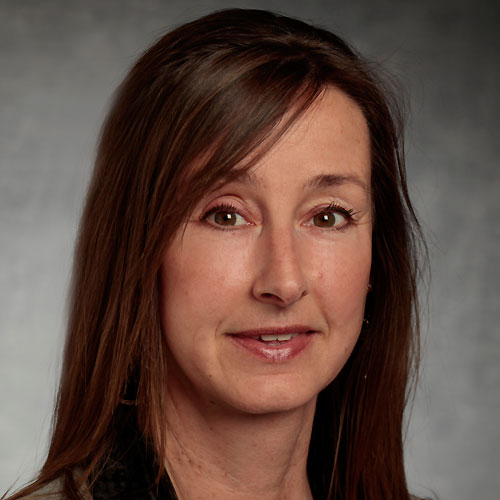
Raquel Rutledge, Pulitzer Prize-winning journalist

- Maureen Bunyan, television journalist, lead co-anchor at WJLA-TV
- Milton Coleman (1968 BFA), deputy managing editor of The Washington Post, president of Inter American Press Association; former president of American Society of News Editors
- Dorothy Fuldheim, journalist and anchor, "First Lady of television news"
- John K. Iglehart (1961 Journalism), founding editor of Health Affairs
- Derrick Zane Jackson, opinion columnist/associate editor for the Boston Globe, UCS fellow
- Ross A. Lewis (1923), Pulitzer Prize-winning editorial cartoonist
- Jim Ott, WTMJ-TV meteorologist; Wisconsin state representative
- Raquel Rutledge (1990 Journalism), Pulitzer Prize-winning journalist
- Terry Zahn, television reporter and anchorman

=== Literature ===
- Emily Ballou, Australian-American poet, novelist and screenwriter
- Robert Cialdini (1967 BS Psychology), psychologist and best-selling author
- Sandra Tabatha Cicero, author
- José Dalisay, Jr. (1988 Ph.D English), writer, poet, playwright
- John Gurda (1978 MA Cultural Geography), writer and narrator of The Making of Milwaukee; eight-time winner of the Wisconsin Historical Society’s Award of Merit
- Adrienne L. Kaeppler, anthropologist, curator of Oceanic Ethnology at the National Museum of Natural History at the Smithsonian Institution
- Caroline Knox, poet
- Marie Kohler (1979 MA English Literature), writer and playwright; member of the Kohler family of Wisconsin
- James Lowder (1999, MA Literary Studies), author and editor
- Mary Rose O'Reilley, poet, Walt Whitman Award recipient
- Lynne Rae Perkins (1991 MA), Newbery Award-winning writer
- Virginia Satir (1936 BA Education), author and psychotherapist
- Gordon Weaver, novelist and short-story writer, O. Henry Award recipient

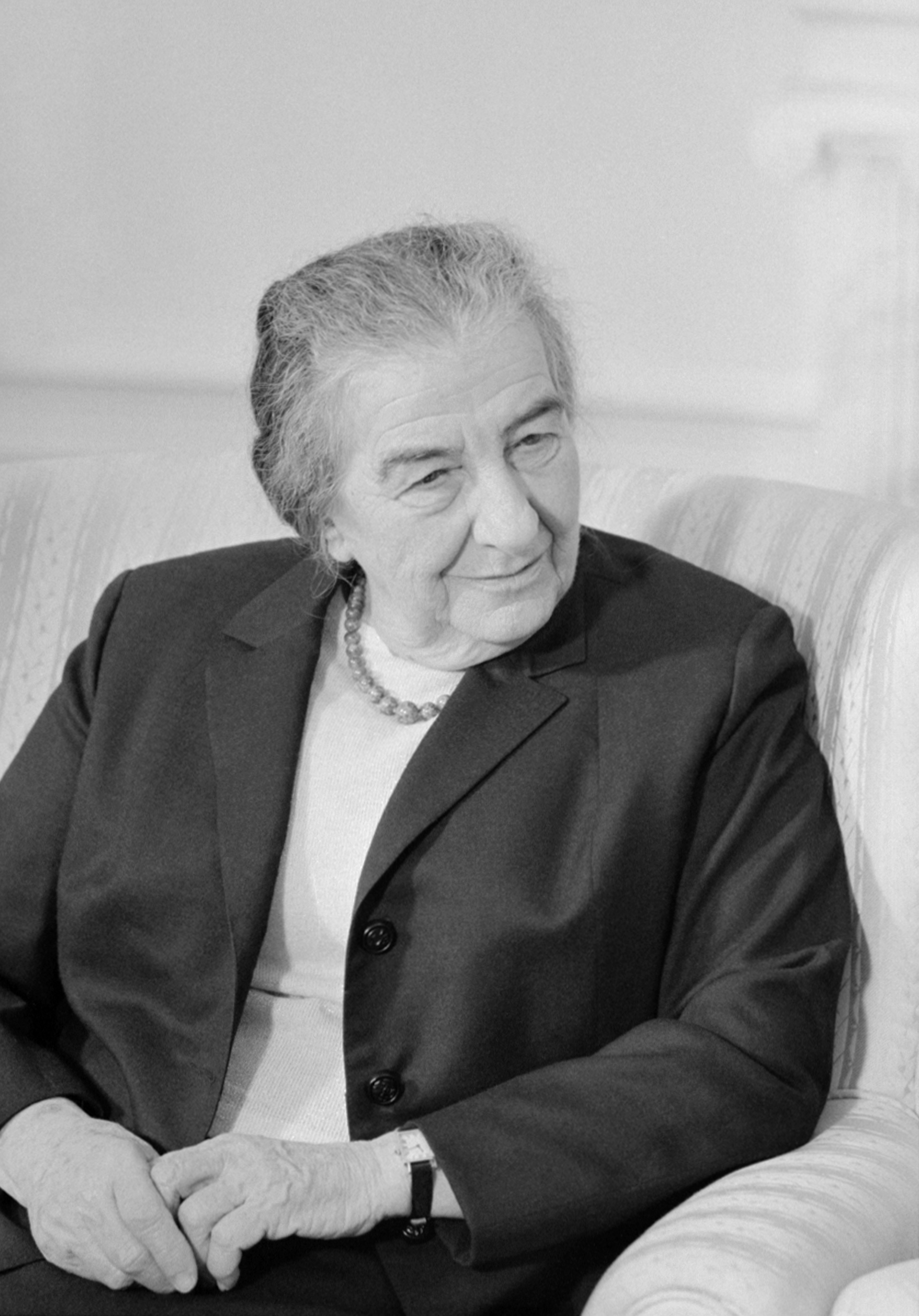
Golda Meir, the fourth Prime Minister of Israel

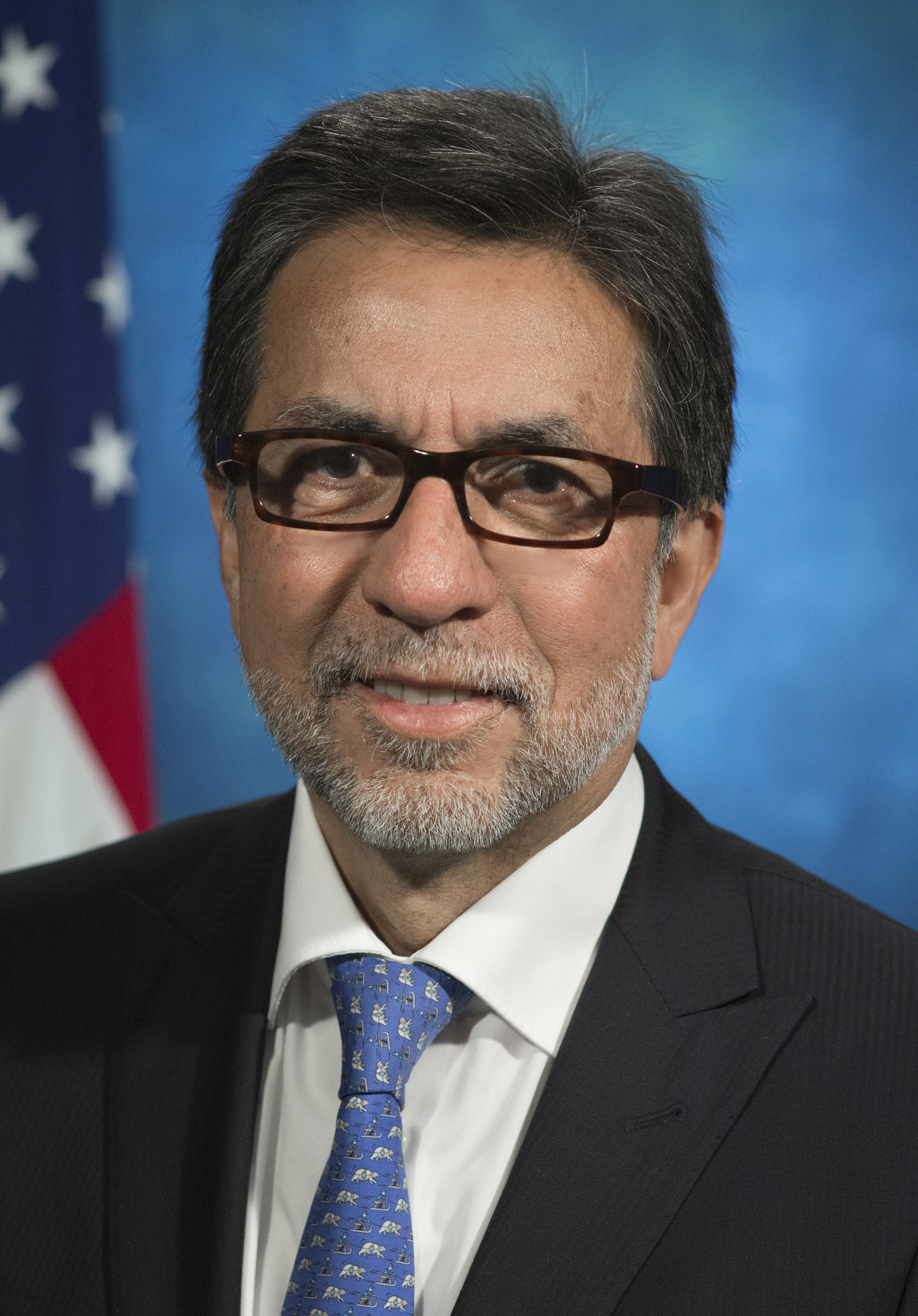
Luis E. Arreaga, United States Ambassador to Guatemala

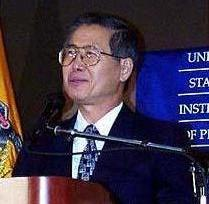
Alberto Fujimori, 90th president of Peru

=== Politics and government ===
- Luis E. Arreaga, U.S. ambassador to Iceland, U.S. ambassador to Guatemala
- Peter W. Barca, U.S. congressman and Wisconsin state representative from Kenosha
- Tim Carpenter, Wisconsin state senator from Milwaukee
- Alberta Darling, Wisconsin state representative 1990–1992, Wisconsin state senator, 1992–present from River Hills
- John E. Douglas, former special agent of U.S. Federal Bureau of Investigation (FBI), one of the first criminal profilers, and criminal psychology author
- Alberto Fujimori (1972 MS Mathematics), president of Peru, 1990–2000
- Jeff Halper (Ph.D. in Cultural and Applied Anthropology), anthropologist, political activist, co-founder and director of the Israeli Committee Against House Demolitions
- Jerry Kleczka, U.S. congressman 1984–2005
- Chris Larson, Wisconsin state senator from Milwaukee
- Mary Lazich, president of the Wisconsin State Senate
- Henry Maier (1964 MA Political Science), Milwaukee mayor 1960–1988
- Golda Meir (1917, Education), fourth prime minister of Israel; one of the signers of the Declaration of Independence of the State of Israel
- Paa Kwesi Nduom, former Minister for Economic Planning & Regional Cooperation, Energy, and Public Sector Reform of Republic of Ghana
- Jim Ott, Wisconsin state representative from Mequon
- Rudolph T. Randa, Article III federal judge in the United States District Court for the Eastern District of Wisconsin
- Jim Risch, U.S. senator from Idaho
- Karen Sasahara, U.S. ambassador to Jordan, consul general in Jerusalem
- Brad Schimel (1987 BA Political Science), 44th Wisconsin attorney general
- Martin J. Schreiber (1960), 38th lieutenant governor of Wisconsin and 39th governor of Wisconsin
- Steve Sisolak (1974, BS Business), 30th governor of Nevada
- Paul Trombino III (BS civil engineering), director of the Iowa Department of Transportation, president of the American Association of State Highway and Transportation Officials

=== Science and technology ===
- Michael Dhuey, electrical and computer engineer, co-inventor of the Macintosh II and the iPod
- Luther Graef (1961 MS Structural Engineering), founder of Graef Anhalt Schloemer & Associates Inc., former president of American Society of Civil Engineers
- Justin Jacobs (2005 MS Mathematics), recipient of Presidential Early Career Award for Scientists and Engineers
- Phil Katz (1984, BS Computer Science), computer programmer known as the author of PKZIP
- Jack Kilby (1950 MS Electrical Engineering), engineer
- Satya Nadella (MS Computer Science), CEO of Microsoft
- Cheng Xu (1997 Ph.D Turbomachinery), aerodynamic design engineer, American Society of Mechanical Engineers fellow
- Scott Yanoff (1993 BS Computer Science), Internet pioneer

=== Sports ===
==== Athletes ====
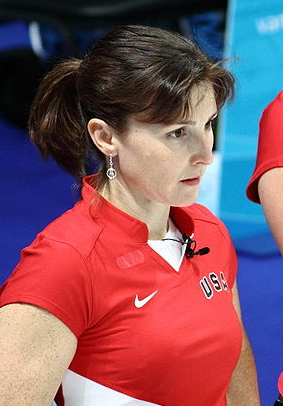
Allison Pottinger , USA female curling athlete of the year in 2008, 2012

- Christine Boskoff, world-class mountaineer, reached more record summits than any other female in history
- Tighe Dombrowski, MLS soccer player
- Ricky Franklin, basketball player
- Don Gramenz, Minnesota Thunder defender
- Sarah Hagen, American footballer of FC Kansas City United States women's national soccer team
- Demetrius Harris, NFL football player, tight end of Kansas City Chiefs
- P. J. Johns, soccer goalkeeper, member of the United States national futsal team
- Ken Kranz, NFL football player
- Alan Kulwicki (1977 BS Mechanical Engineering), 1992 NASCAR Winston Cup champion, named one of NASCAR's 50 Greatest Drivers, inducted into the International Motorsports Hall of Fame

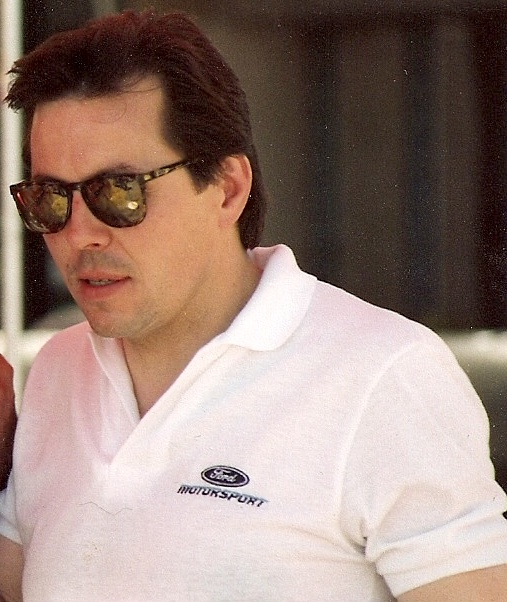
Alan Kulwicki, NASCAR Winston Cup champion, inducted into the International Motorsports Hall of Fame

- Manny Lagos, MLS soccer player; U.S. Olympian
- Clem Neacy, NFL football player
- Dylan Page, Chorale Roanne Basket basketball player in France
- Allison Pottinger (MBA Marketing), curler; 2003 gold medalist and 2006 silver medalist at the World Curling Championships
- Mike Reinfeldt (1975 BA Business), NFL All-Pro defensive back, general manager of Tennessee Titans, former Seattle Seahawks chief financial officer
- Tony Sanneh, MLS soccer player; United States men's national soccer team and U.S. World Cup team member * George H. Sutton, professional billiard player, the "handless billiard player"
- Clay Tucker basketball player
- Daulton Varsho MLB baseball player
- Mitchell Whitmore, speed skater

==== Coaches and referees ====
- Jimmy Banks (1987 Education), Milwaukee School of Engineering men's soccer team head coach
- Bill Carollo (1974 BBA Industrial Relations), NFL referee
- Sasho Cirovski (1985 BBA, 1989 MBA), University of Maryland men's soccer team head coach
- Jeff Rohrman, UW–Madison men's soccer team head coach
- Bruce Weber (1978 BA Education), Kansas State University men's basketball head coach

=== Others ===
- Lynde Bradley Uihlein (MS Social Welfare), philanthropist
- Clara Stanton Jones, first African-American president of the American Library Association, first African-American director of a major city public library in the US
- Patricia Wells (BA Journalism), cookbook author

== Notable faculty ==
- Bruce Allen, physicist and professor, fellow of American Physical Society and fellow of Institute of Physics (UK)
- Anne Basting, professor of theater and expert on aging, dementia and the arts; 2016 MacArthur Fellowship winner
- Y. Austin Chang, former professor and department chair of material engineering; elected member of the National Academy of Engineering; elected foreign member of the Chinese Academy of Sciences; fellow of The Minerals, Metals & Materials Society; fellow of ASM International
- Cecelia Condit, video artist, professor in film, video, animation and new genres
- Rebecca Dunham, poet, professor of English
- Millicent (Penny) Ficken, ornithologist who specialized in birds' vocalizations and their social behaviors
- Jane Gallop, writer, university distinguished professor
- John Brian Harley, professor of geography
- William D. Haseman, Wisconsin Distinguished Professor of Business
- John Koethe, professor of philosophy, poet and essayist
- Leonard Parker, physicist and professor, fellow of American Physical Society
- Brett Peters, industrial engineer, fellow of the Institute of Industrial Engineers, dean of the College of Engineering and Applied Science
- Amos Rapoport, University Distinguished Professor of Architecture
- Pradeep Rohatgi, UWM Distinguished Professor of Engineering
- Harriet Werley, professor of nursing; charter fellow and a Living Legend of the American Academy of Nursing; fellow of the American College of Medical Informatics; founding editor of Research in Nursing and Health; co-creator of the Nursing Minimum Data Set

== University chancellors ==
- J. Martin Klotsche (1956–1973)
- Werner A. Baum (1973–1979)
- Frank E. Horton (1980–1985)
- Clifford V. Smith, Jr. (1985–1990)
- John H. Schroeder (1991–1998)
- Nancy L. Zimpher (1998–2003)
- Carlos E. Santiago (2004–2010)
- Michael Lovell (2010–2014)
- Thomas J. Gibson (2015–to present)
