= University of Wisconsin–Milwaukee College of Engineering and Applied Science =

College within the University of Wisconsin–Milwaukee

Coordinates: 43.0758°N 87.8859°W

UW-Milwaukee College of Engineering and Applied Science
- Motto: Discover. Innovate. Lead.
- Type: Public
- Established: 1964
- Dean: Brett Peters
- Undergraduates: 1,568
- Postgraduates: 399
- Location: Milwaukee, Wisconsin, United States
- Campus: University of Wisconsin–Milwaukee
- Website: http://www.uwm.edu/CEAS
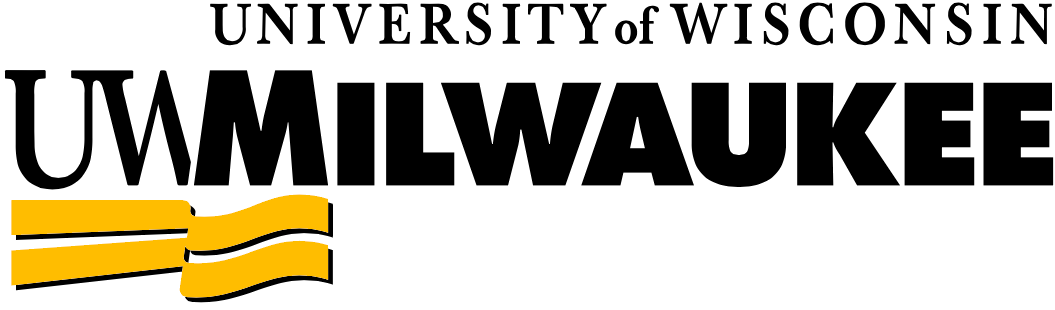

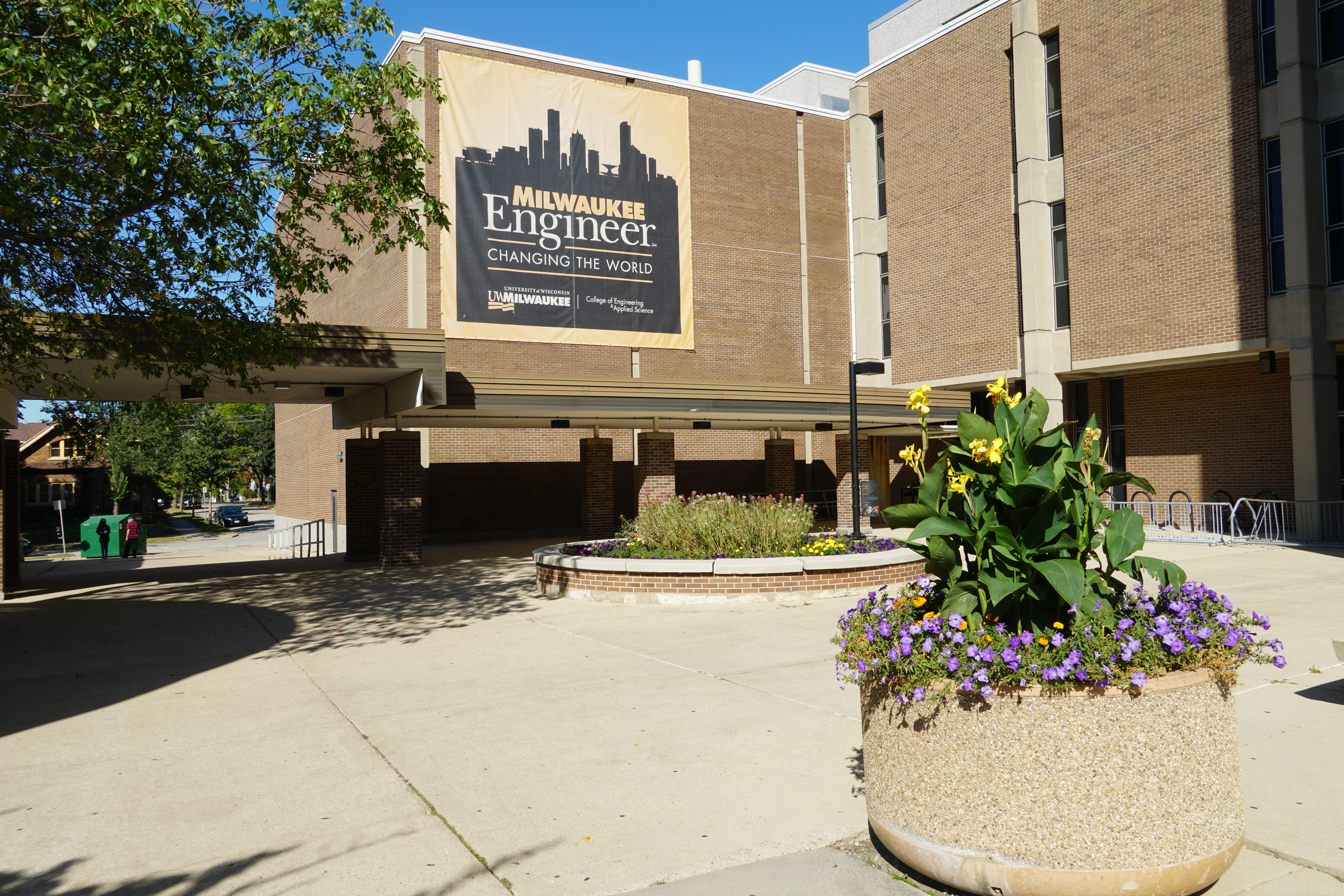
Engineering and Math Building

The College of Engineering and Applied Science is a college within the University of Wisconsin–Milwaukee. It offers bachelor, master and doctoral degrees in civil engineering, electrical engineering, industrial engineering, materials engineering, mechanical engineering, and computer science.

Based on the statistical analysis by H.J. Newton, Professor of Statistics at Texas A&M University in 1997 on the National Research Council report issued in 1995, the school was ranked 73rd nationally in the National Research Council (NRC) rankings, with its Civil Engineering program 69th, Electronic Engineering 96th, Industrial Engineering 34th, Materials science 60th, and Mechanical Engineering 87th. The school ranks 129th nationally by U.S. News & World Report, with its computer science program ranked 110th in 2011.

== Departments ==
- Civil Engineering & Mechanics
- Computer Science
- Electrical Engineering
- Industrial & Manufacturing Engineering
- Materials Science
- Mechanical Engineering

== Research centers ==
- Center for Alternative Fuels Research Programs
- Center for By-Products Utilization
- Center for Composite Materials
- Center for Cryptography, Computer, & Network Security
- Center for Ergonomics
- Center for Urban Transportation Studies
- Center for Energy Analysis & Diagnostics
- Southeastern Wisconsin Energy Technology Research Center

== Notable people ==
- Satya Nadella ('90 MS Computer Science), Microsoft CEO.
- Michael Dhuey, electrical and computer engineer, co-inventor of the Macintosh II and the iPod.
- Luther Graef ('61 MS Structural Engineering), Founder of Graef Anhalt Schloemer & Associates Inc., and former President of ASCE.
- Phil Katz ('84, BS Computer Science), a computer programmer best known as the author of PKZIP.
- Pradeep Rohatgi, Wisconsin Distinguished Professor of Engineering
- Cheng Xu, aerodynamic design engineer, American Society of Mechanical Engineers Fellow
- Y. Austin Chang, material engineering researcher and educator
- Scott Yanoff ('93 BS Computer Science), Internet pioneer.
- Alan Kulwicki ('77 BS Mechanical Engineering), 1992 NASCAR Cup Series champion driver and team owner

== See also ==
- Jantar-Mantar
