= List of Northern Michigan Wildcats in the NFL draft =

This is a list of Northern Michigan Wildcats football players in the NFL draft.

== Key ==
B	Back	K	Kicker	NT	Nose tackle
C	Center	LB	Linebacker	FB	Fullback
DB	Defensive back	P	Punter	HB	Halfback
DE	Defensive end	QB	Quarterback	WR	Wide receiver
DT	Defensive tackle	RB	Running back	G	Guard
E	End	T	Offensive tackle	TE	Tight end

== Selections ==
Year	Round	Pick	Overall	Player	Team	Position
1961	16	9	219	Gus Krantz	Detroit Lions	T
1961	19	10	262	Gene Valesano	Detroit Lions	B
1962	10	3	129	Jerry Goerlitz	Cleveland Browns	C
1964	13	13	181	Jack Mauro	Green Bay Packers	T
1964	17	13	237	Len St. Jean	Green Bay Packers	E
1967	4	23	103	Curtis Marker	Dallas Cowboys	G
1968	12	25	325	Dennis Porter	Green Bay Packers	T
1969	14	23	361	Gerald Lutri	Dallas Cowboys	T
1970	11	2	262	Ted Rose	Chicago Bears	TE
1970	12	13	299	Lonnie Holton	Atlanta Falcons	RB
1972	4	5	83	Tim Kearney	Dallas Cowboys	LB
1973	17	10	426	Guy Falkenhagen	Baltimore Colts	T
1974	4	23	101	Andy Adrade	Dallas Cowboys	RB
1974	9	3	211	Jim Rathje	New York Giants	RB
1975	13	16	328	Joe Harvey	New England Patriots	DE
1976	8	26	235	Stu Betts	New England Patriots	RB
1977	11	9	288	Maurice Mitchell	Kansas City Chiefs	WR
1980	8	9	202	Todd Krueger	Buffalo Bills	QB
1981	10	9	257	Phil Kessel	Washington Redskins	QB
1989	7	3	170	Jerry Woods	Detroit Lions	DB
1991	9	26	249	Mark Maddox	Buffalo Bills	LB
2023	7	19	236	Jake Witt	Indianapolis Colts	T
