= List of Northern Michigan University people =

List of Northern Michigan University people contains a dynamic list of all notable alumni of Northern Michigan University.

== Alumni ==
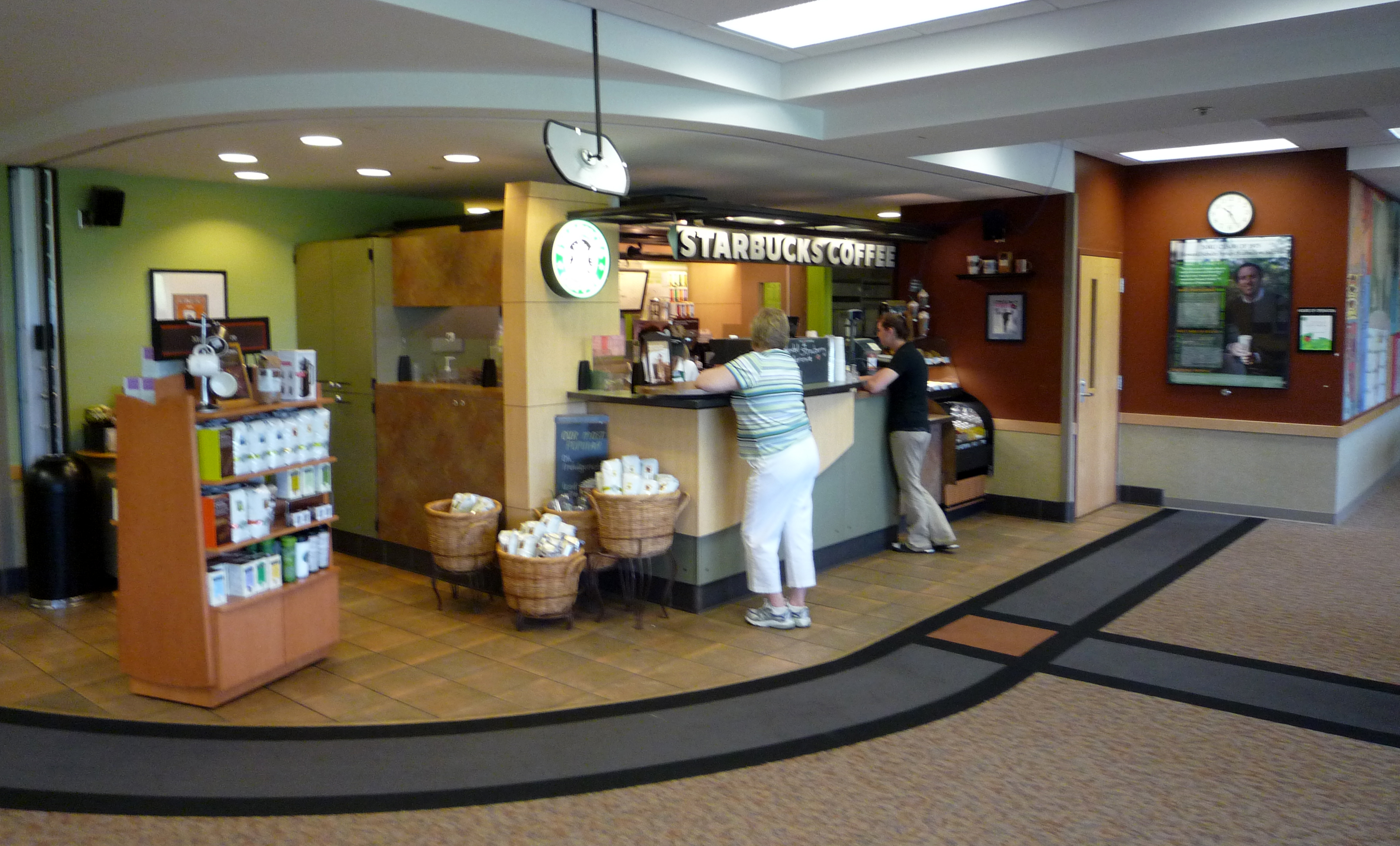
Longtime Starbucks CEO Howard Schultz is an alumnus of NMU. As a result, NMU had the first Starbucks in Michigan's Upper Peninsula (formerly located in the Learning Resource Center). He is pictured in the poster at right.

- Nick Baumgartner, Winter X Games gold medalist in 2011 Snowboard Cross event, became oldest Olympic gold medalist in 2022
- Andy Bisek, Greco-Roman wrestler
- Steve Bozek, NHL player, Calgary Flames, San Jose Sharks
- Timothy Bradley, professional boxer, welterweight and junior-welterweight champion
- Jason Cameron, actor and personal trainer; formerly of While You Were Out, currently affiliated with DIY Network
- Lloyd Carr, former head football coach, University of Michigan
- Bob Chase, play-by-play announcer for Fort Wayne Komets
- Cornelius Coe, football player
- Dan David, investor, activist short-seller, and whistle-blower
- Shani Davis, Olympic speed skater; first black athlete from any nation to win gold medal in individual Winter Olympics sport
- Dallas Drake, hockey player, won Stanley Cup with Detroit Red Wings in 2008; former captain of St. Louis Blues
- Vernon Forrest, professional boxer, welterweight and light-heavyweight champion
- Chad Gable, Greco-Roman wrestler, professional wrestler signed to WWE on the Raw brand
- Jerry Glanville, head coach of NFL's Houston Oilers and Atlanta Falcons; also of Portland State University
- Aurora Gozmic, drag queen
- Caitlin Compton Gregg, cross-country skier, took bronze in 2015 World Ski Championships
- Erik Gustafsson, hockey player for Philadelphia Flyers
- Sheila E. Hixson, member of the Maryland House of Delegates
- John D. Holum, under secretary of state for Arms Control and International Security under Bill Clinton
- Tom Izzo, men's basketball coach, Michigan State University
- Bobby Jurasin, CFL player for Saskatchewan Roughriders, and Toronto Argonauts
- Tim Kearney, NFL, 10-year veteran
- Bob Kroll, NFL player for Green Bay Packers
- Tom Laidlaw, NHL player
- John Lautner, modern architect
- Mark Maddox, NFL player for Buffalo Bills
- Kelsey Mann, director, Inside Out 2
- Steve Mariucci, head coach of Detroit Lions, San Francisco 49ers, and University of California
- Justin Marlowe, professor of public finance at the University of Washington
- Helen Maroulis, first American gold medalist in Olympic women's freestyle wrestling (2016)
- Randi Miller, bronze medalist in Olympic women's freestyle wrestling (2008)
- Jason Morgan, representative-elect for Michigan House of Representatives District 23 and Northern Michigan University trustee
- Mark Olver, hockey player for Colorado Avalanche
- Nathan Oystrick, hockey player for Phoenix Coyotes
- David Prychitko, researcher, author and professor of economics at Northern Michigan University
- Jan Quarless, PhD, Division 1 head football coach
- Robert Saleh, NFL head coach, Tennessee Titans
- Mike Santorelli, hockey player for Vancouver Canucks
- Howard Schultz, CEO and chairman of Starbucks
- Dave Siciliano, ice hockey coach and player, Master of Physical Education degree
- Joseph A. Strohl, former member of the Wisconsin State Senate
- Jackie Swanson, actress, television series Cheers, films including Lethal Weapon and numerous TV commercials
- Brian Viloria, professional boxer
- Don Waddell, NHL player and coach
- Ed Ward, hockey player for Calgary Flames
- Steve Weeks, NHL player, New York Rangers, Vancouver Canucks
- DaVarryl Williamson, professional boxer, Colorado Golden Gloves Hall of Fame member
- Jake Witt, NFL player for the Indianapolis Colts
- Jerry Woods, NFL player for Green Bay Packers
- James Worth, a.k.a. J. Mark Worth, Maine state representative
