= Merry E. Wiesner-Hanks =

American historian

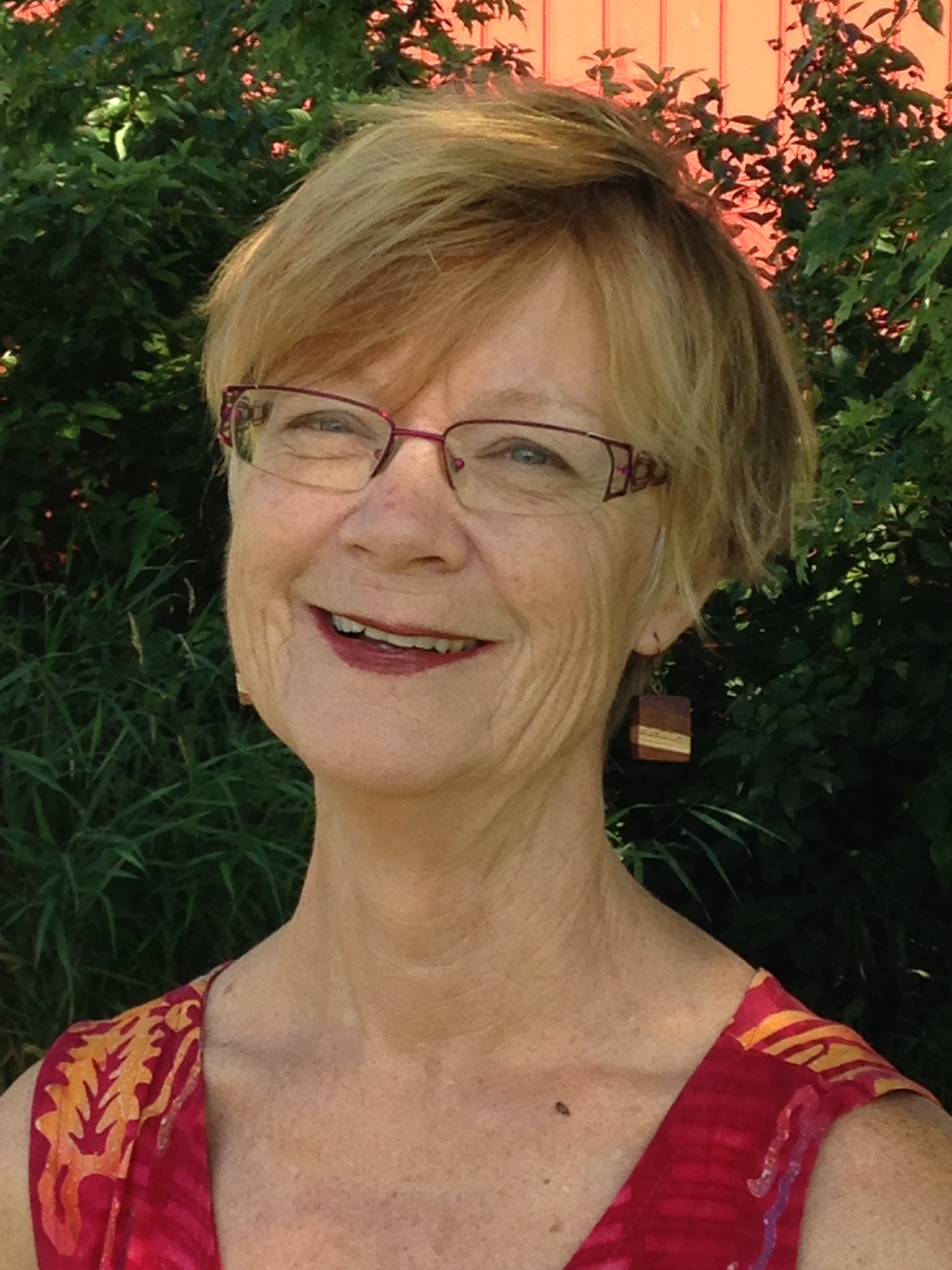
- 2017
- Born: 20th century
- Education: University of Wisconsin-Madison (PhD)
- Occupations: Academic, historian
- Employer: University of Wisconsin–Milwaukee (Distinguished Professor Emerita)

Merry E. Wiesner-Hanks (born 20th century) is an American historian and Distinguished Professor Emerita at the University of Wisconsin–Milwaukee's Department of History.

She describes herself as wearing "two hats, one as a historian of early modern Europe and the other as a world/global historian, with a primary focus on women, gender, and sexuality within these." She has taught and published in European history, world history, and history pedagogy, and has served as the president of the Sixteenth Century Society, the Society for Reformation Research, the Society for the Study of Early Modern Women and Gender, and the World History Association.

== Biography ==
She received a Ph.D. from the University of Wisconsin–Madison, and before moving to the University of Wisconsin–Milwaukee she was an assistant professor at Augustana College, Rock Island, Illinois, from 1979 to 1985.

She is editor-in-chief of the seven-volume 2015 Cambridge World History, and co-editor of three of its parts: Volume 5: Expanding Webs of Exchange and Conflict, 500 CE–1500 CE with Benjamin Z. Kedar and Volume 6: The Construction of a Global World, 1400–1800 CE, Part 1: Foundations and Part 2: Patterns of Change with Jerry H. Bentley and Sanjay Subrahmanyam. She is also the co-editor, with Mathew Kuefler, of the four-volume 2024 Cambridge World History of Sexualities: Volume 1: General Overviews; Volume 2: Systems of Thought and Belief; Volume 3: Sites of Knowledge and Practice; and Volume 4: Modern Sexualities.

Wiesner-Hanks is the senior editor of Sixteenth Century Journal, and from 2011 to 2020 was an editor of the Journal of Global History. She was the Chief Reader for Advanced Placement World History, is on the board for the Society for History Education and World History Commons, and was one of the history authors of the College, Career, and Civic Life (C3) Framework for Social Studies State Standards, which by 2017 had been incorporated into the social studies standards in twenty-three states.

She has also been on the author team of several textbooks used in college and Advanced Placement high school classrooms. These include Discovering the Western Past (Cengage Group, 7th ed., 2014) and A History of Western Society (Bedford/St. Martin's, 14th ed., 2023) often used in Advanced Placement European History classes.

She edited the book Challenging Women’s Agency and Activism in Early Modernity (Amsterdam University Press, 2021), which was the winner of the 2021 Society for the Study of Early Modern Women and Gender Prize for a Collaborative Project.

== Selected publications ==
- Working Women in Renaissance Germany. New Brunswick, New Jersey: Rutgers University Press, 1986.
- Women and Gender in Early Modern Europe. Cambridge University Press, 1993.
- Editor, co-translator with Joan Skocir, Convents Confront the Reformation: Catholic and Protestant Nuns in Germany. Milwaukee: Marquette University Press, 1996.
- Gender, Church, and State in Early Modern Germany: Essays by Merry E. Wiesner. London, Longman, 1998.
- Co-editor with Renate Bridenthal and Susan Stuard, Becoming Visible: Women in European History. 3rd edition, Boston: Houghton Mifflin, 1998.
- Co-editor with Lisa Di Caprio, Lives and Voices: A Sourcebook on European Women. Boston: Houghton Mifflin, 2001.
- Co-editor with Monica Chojnacka, Ages of Woman, Ages of Man: Sources in European Social History, 1400–1750. London: Longman, 2002.
- Christianity and Sexuality in the Early Modern World: Regulating Desire, Reforming Practice. London: Routledge/Kegan Paul, 2000.
- Gender in History: Global Perspectives. London: Blackwell, 2001.
- Co-editor and co-translator with Susan Karant-Nunn, Luther on Women: A Sourcebook. Cambridge University Press, 2003. ISBN 9780521658843.
- Co-editor with Teresa Meade: A Companion to Global Gender History, London: Blackwell, 2004.
- An Age of Voyages, 1350-1600. New York: Oxford University Press, 2005. ISBN 9780195176728.
- Early Modern Europe, 1450-1789. Cambridge University Press, 2006.
- The Marvelous Hairy Girls: The Gonzales Sisters and their Worlds. London: Yale University Press, 2009. ISBN 9780300127331.
- Religious Transformations in the Early Modern World: A Brief History with Documents. Boston: Bedford/St. Martin's, 2009. ISBN 9780312458867.
- Co-editor with Peter Y. Paik, Debt: Ethics, the Environment, and the Economy. Bloomington: Indiana University Press, 2013.
- A Concise History of the World. Cambridge University Press, 2015. ISBN 9781107694538.
- Editor, Mapping Gendered Routes and Spaces in the Early Modern World. Aldershot: Ashgate, 2015. ISBN 9780367880149.
- With Urmi Engineer Willoughby, A Primer for Teaching Women, Gender, and Sexuality in World History. Durham, North Carolina: Duke University Press, 2018. ISBN 9781478002475.
- Editor, Gendered Temporalities in the Early Modern World. Amsterdam University Press, 2018. ISBN 9789462984585.
- What Is Early Modern History? London: Polity, 2021. ISBN 9781509540563.
- Editor, Challenging Women’s Agency and Activism in Early Modernity. Amsterdam University Press, 2021. ISBN 9789463729321.
- Women and the Reformations: A Global History. Yale University Press, 2024. ISBN 9780300268232.

== See also ==
- List of historians
- List of people from Illinois
- List of University of Wisconsin–Madison people
- List of University of Wisconsin–Milwaukee people
- List of women writers
