= Vogl =

Vogl is a surname. Notable people with the surname include:

- Alois Vogl (born 1972), German alpine skier
- Donald George Vogl (born 1929), American artist and academic
- Emerich Vogl (1905–1971), Romanian footballer and manager
- Heinrich Vogl (1845–1900), German opera singer
- Johann Michael Vogl (1768–1840), Austrian opera singer and composer
- Joseph Vogl (born 1957), German philosopher
- Julia Vogl (born 1985), American artist
- Kajetán Vogl (c. 1750–1794), Czech composer
- Markus Vogl (born 1970), Austrian politician
- Otto Vogl (born 1927), American chemist
- Sylvia Vogl (born 1974), Austrian yacht racer
- Therese Vogl (1845–1921), German opera singer
- Thomas Vogl (born 1958), German radiologist
