= Alpha Sigma Mu =

International metallurgy honor society

- ΑΣΜ
- Founded: January 1932; 94 years ago Michigan Technological University
- Type: Honor
- Affiliation: ACHS
- Status: Active
- Emphasis: Metallurgy and Materials Engineering
- Scope: International
- Colors: Silver and Gold
- Symbol: C-curve
- Publication: ASM blog
- Chapters: 34
- Members: 150 active 8,000+ lifetime
- Headquarters: c/o Walter W. Milligan; Department of Materials Science and Engineering; Michigan Technological University; 1400 Townsend Drive; Houghton, Michigan 49931; United States
- Website: www.alphasigmamu.org

Alpha Sigma Mu (ΑΣΜ) is an international scholastic honor society recognizing academic achievement among students in the fields of metallurgy and materials engineering. It was established in 1932 at Michigan Technological University.

== History ==
Alpha Sigma Mu was founded by the Metallurgy Department of the Michigan College of Mining and Technology (now Michigan Technological University) in January 1932. It was established as a scholastic honor society to recognize academic achievement of students of metallurgy, metallurgical engineering, and materials engineering.

After expanding to three campuses, it maintained these three chapters without further growth. In 1957, the society was reorganized with the assistance of the American Society for Metals. Alpha Sigma Mu was admitted to the Association of College Honor Societies in 1965.

It separated from the American Society for Metals in the 1990s. In the 21st century, it expanded internationally, with chapters installed in Australia, India, Russia, and Spain.

In 2012, the society had 34 active chapters, 150 active members, and a total membership of over 8,000. Its headquarters are housed at Michigan Technological University in Houghton, Michigan.

== Symbols ==
The Alpha Sigma Mu badge is a rectangular gold or silver key engraved with a C-curve and the Greek letters ΑΣΜ. The society's colors are silver and gold. Its symbol is the C-curve. Its publication is ASM Blog.

== Membership ==
Alpha Sigma Mu has three classes of membership: regular (student), honorary, and distinguished life members. Potential student members are nominated by the chapters' faculty advisors. Initiates are juniors and seniors ranked in the top 25 percent of the department, with and a GPA in the top fifty percent. Graduate students are also eligible for membership.

== Chapters ==
Following is list of Alpha Sigma Mu chapters.

Chapter	Charter date and range	Institution	Location	Status	Ref.
Michigan Alpha	January 1932	Michigan Technological University	Houghton, Michigan	Active	(Note: Chapter formed at the Michigan College of Mining and Technology, now Michigan Technological University.)
		Auburn University	Auburn, Alabama	Active	
		Boise State University	Boise, Idaho	Inactive	
		California Polytechnic State University, San Luis Obispo	San Luis Obispo, California	Active	
		California State Polytechnic University, Pomona	Pomona, California	Active	
		Carnegie Mellon University	Pittsburgh, Pennsylvania	Inactive	
		Case Western Reserve University	Cleveland, Ohio	Inactive	
Colorado Alpha		Colorado School of Mines	Golden, Colorado	Active	
		Cornell University	Ithaca, New York	Active	
Pennsylvania Alpha		Drexel University	Philadelphia, Pennsylvania	Active	
		Georgia Tech	Atlanta, Georgia	Inactive	
India Alpha	2016	IIT Bombay	Mumbai, Maharashtra, India	Active	
		Iowa State University	Ames, Iowa	Inactive	
		Lafayette College	Easton, Pennsylvania	Inactive	
		Lehigh University	Bethlehem, Pennsylvania	Active	
		Massachusetts Institute of Technology	Cambridge, Massachusetts	Inactive	
		Michigan State University	East Lansing, Michigan	Active	
		Missouri University of Science and Technology	Rolla, Missouri	Active	(Note: Chapter formed at the Missouri School of Mines and Metallurgy, now Missouri University of Science and Technology.)
		Montana Technological University	Butte, Montana	Inactive	(Note: Chapter formed at the Montana College of Mineral Science and Technology, now the Montana Technological University.)
		New Jersey Institute of Technology	Newark, New Jersey	Inactive	
		New Mexico Institute of Mining and Technology	Socorro, New Mexico	Inactive	
		North Carolina State University	Raleigh, North Carolina	Inactive	
		Northwestern University	Evanston, Illinois	Inactive	
		Ohio State University	Columbus, Ohio	Inactive	
		Pennsylvania State University	State College, Pennsylvania	Inactive	
Russia Alpha	May 2014	Peter the Great St. Petersburg Polytechnic University	Saint Petersburg, Russia	Active	
		Purdue University	West Lafayette, Indiana	Active	
		Rensselaer Polytechnic Institute	Troy, New York	Active	
		South Dakota School of Mines and Technology	Rapid City, South Dakota	Inactive	
Australia Alpha	October 5, 2010	Swinburne University of Technology	Melbourne, Victoria, Australia	Active	
		Texas A&M University	College Station, Texas	Active	
		University of Alabama	Tuscaloosa, Alabama	Inactive	
		University of Alabama at Birmingham	Birmingham, Alabama	Active	
		University of California, Irvine	Irvine, California	Inactive	
		University of California, Los Angeles	Los Angeles, California	Inactive	
		University of Cincinnati	Cincinnati, Ohio	Inactive	
		University of Connecticut	Storrs, Connecticut	Active	
		University of Florida	Gainesville, Florida	Inactive	
		University of Illinois Urbana-Champaign	Urbana, Illinois	Inactive	
		University of Kentucky	Lexington, Kentucky	Active	
		University of Maryland, College Park	College Park, Maryland	Active	
Michigan Gamma		University of Michigan	Ann Arbor, Michigan	Active	
		University of North Texas	Denton, Texas	Active	
		University of Notre Dame	Notre Dame, Indiana	Inactive	
Spain Alpha	2013	University of Oviedo	Asturias, Spain	Active	
		University of Pennsylvania	Philadelphia, Pennsylvania	Inactive	
		University of Pittsburgh	Pittsburgh, Pennsylvania	Active	
		University of Texas at El Paso	El Paso, Texas	Active	
		University of Wisconsin–Madison	Madison, Wisconsin	Inactive	
	19xx ? – 1988; May 2009	Virginia Tech	Blacksburg, Virginia	Active	
		Worcester Polytechnic Institute	Worcester, Massachusetts	Active	
		Wright State University	Fairborn, Ohio	Inactive	

== Notable members ==
- Y. Austin Chang, material engineering researcher and professor emeritus at the University of Wisconsin–Madison
- Anthony G. Evans, professor of materials and mechanical engineering at the University of California, Santa Barbara
- Mukta Farooq, metallurgical engineer for IBM
- Larry L. Hench, emeritus professor at the University of Florida and chair of the Ceramic Materials Department at Imperial College London; inventor of Bioglass 45S5
- Julie Schoenung, materials scientist who is a professor at the University of California, Irvine

== See also ==
- Professional fraternities and sororities
