= Fogl =

Fogl is a surname, a Czech (Fógl) and Hungarian (Fógl, Fogl) variant of Vogl. Notable people with the surname include:

- Ferenc Fogl (1887–1954), Hungarian footballer
- József Fogl, also Károly Fogoly, Fogl III or József Újpesti (1897–1971), Hungarian footballer
- Katalin Fogl (born 1983), Hungarian footballer
- Károly Fogl, also JózsefFogoly, Fogl II, or Károly Újpesti (1895–1969), Hungarian footballer
