= Julie Schoenung =

American materials scientist and academic

Julie Mae Schoenung
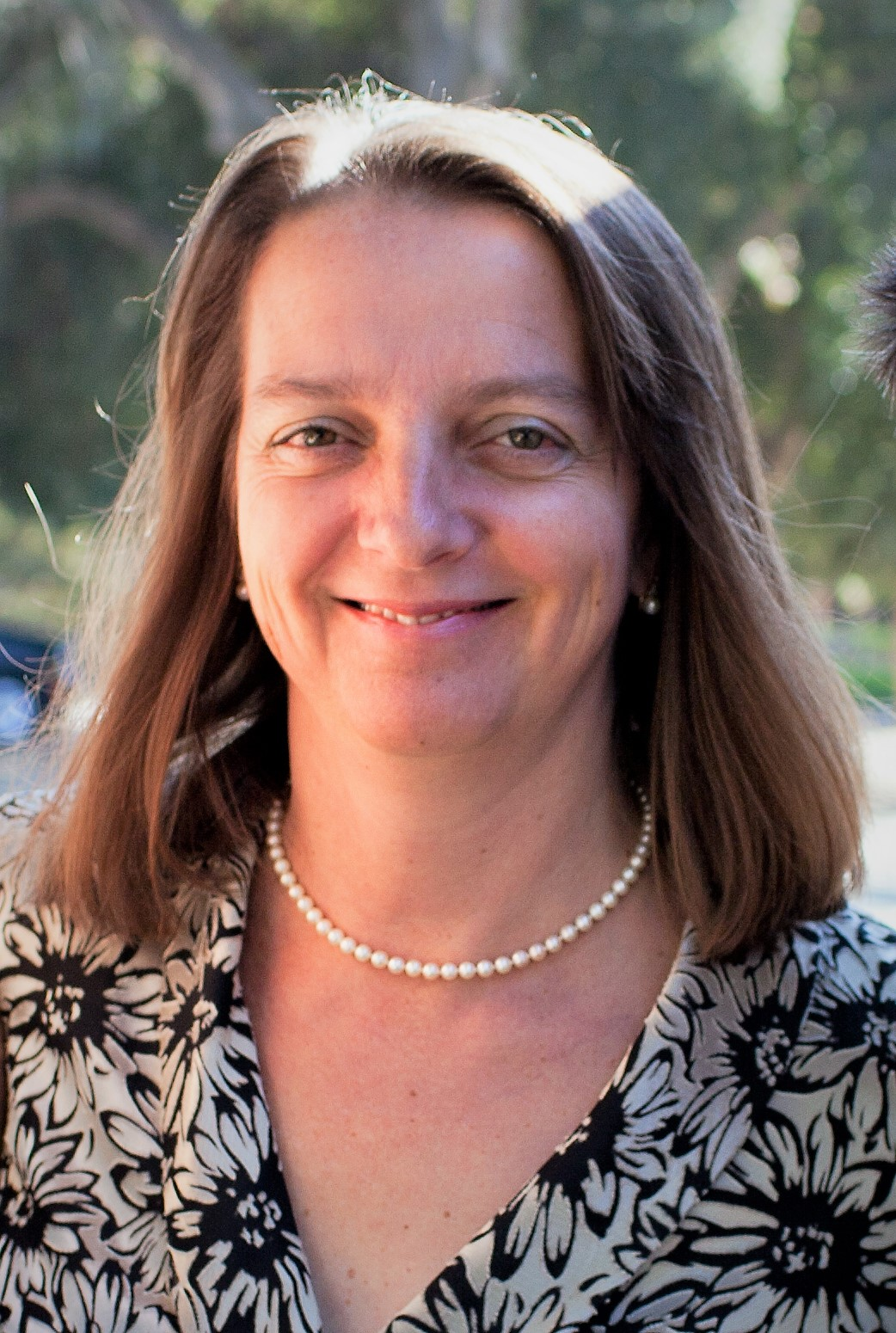
- Schoenung at the UC Davis 50th Anniversary Gala in 2012
- Education: Massachusetts Institute of Technology; University of Illinois Urbana-Champaign
- Scientific career
- Workplaces: California State Polytechnic; University of California, Davis; University of California, Irvine; Texas A&M University
- Thesis: An engineering and economic assessment of the potential for ceramics in automotive engines. (1987)

Julie Mae Schoenung is an American materials scientist who is a professor at Texas A&M University. She was previously a professor at the University of California, Irvine. She is co-director for the University of California Toxic Substances Research and Teaching Program Lead Campus in Green Materials. Her research considers trimodal composites and green engineering. She was elected Fellow of The Minerals, Metals & Materials Society in 2021.

== Early life and education ==
Schoenung was an undergraduate student in Chicago, where she studied materials science at the University of Illinois Urbana-Champaign. She moved to Massachusetts Institute of Technology for graduate studies, earning a master's degree in 1985 and a PhD in 1987. Her doctoral research considered an economic assessment of ceramics for automotive engines. After earning her doctorate Schonung moved to California. She joined California State Polytechnic University in 1989.

== Research and career ==
Schonung moved to the University of California, Davis. She was appointed to the faculty at the University of California, Irvine in 2015. She is interested in nanostructured materials and green engineering processes. To generate nanostructures in functional materials, Schoenung makes use of cryomilling. Cryomilling can improve the oxidation behaviour of thermal barrier coatings as well as generating boron carbide reinforced aluminium nanocomposites. Green engineering processes are safer for the environment; they are less energy demanding, generate less pollution and do not release toxic chemicals. In particular, Schoenung is interested in the problem of electronic-waste and the infrastructure required for e-waste recycling.

Her research considers the factors that surround decision making in materials selection, with a particular focus on sustainability. She combines life-cycle assessment with management theory and environmental economics.

In 2008, Schoenung was appointed to the Green Ribbon Science Panel, a group of researchers appointed by Arnold Schwarzenegger to protect Californians from toxic chemicals.

== Awards and honors ==
- 2012 Elected Fellow of the ASM International
- 2016 Acta Materialia, Inc Holloman Award for Materials & Society
- 2016 Elected Fellow of the Alpha Sigma Mu International Professional Honor Society
- 2017 Materials Science & Engineering-A Innovation in Research Award
- 2018 ASM International Edward DeMille Campbell Memorial Lectureship
- 2018 Elected Fellow of the American Ceramic Society
- 2021 The Minerals, Metals & Materials Society Fellow Award

== Selected publications ==
- Kang, Hai-Yong; Schoenung, Julie M. (2005). "Electronic waste recycling: A review of U.S. infrastructure and technology options". Resources, Conservation and Recycling. 45 (4): 368–400. doi:10.1016/j.resconrec.2005.06.001. ISSN 0921-3449.
- Ma, Kaka; Wen, Haiming; Hu, Tao; Topping, Troy D.; Isheim, Dieter; Seidman, David N.; Lavernia, Enrique J.; Schoenung, Julie M. (2014). "Mechanical behavior and strengthening mechanisms in ultrafine grain precipitation-strengthened aluminum alloy". Acta Materialia. 62: 141–155. Bibcode:2014AcMat..62..141M. doi:10.1016/j.actamat.2013.09.042. ISSN 1359-6454.
- Scipioni Bertoli, Umberto; Wolfer, Alexander J.; Matthews, Manyalibo J.; Delplanque, Jean-Pierre R.; Schoenung, Julie M. (2017). "On the limitations of Volumetric Energy Density as a design parameter for Selective Laser Melting". Materials & Design. 113: 331–340. doi:10.1016/j.matdes.2016.10.037. ISSN 0264-1275.
