= Sixteenth Century Journal =

- Discipline: History
- Language: English
- Edited by: Raymond B. Waddington; Merry Wiesner-Hanks

Publication details
- History: 1969-present
- Publisher: University of Chicago Press (United States)
- Frequency: Quarterly

Standard abbreviations
- ISO 4: Sixt. Century J.

Indexing
- ISSN: 0361-0160
- LCCN: 72624293
- JSTOR: 03610160
- OCLC no.: 818900636

Links
- Journal homepage; Online archive

The Sixteenth Century Journal: The Journal of Early Modern Studies (SCJ) is a quarterly journal of early modern studies. The senior editors are Merry Wiesner-Hanks and Patricia Phillippy. Until 2022 it was published by Sixteenth Century Publisher Inc. and affiliated with the Sixteenth Century Society and Conference. In 2023, the Sixteenth Century Society took over ownership of the journal, which is to be published from 2024 by the University of Chicago Press.

SCJ was founded in 1969, and has been at Truman State University since 1971. It was initially a biannual journal and moved to quarterly publication in 1976.
