= Northern Michigan Wildcats football =

| 2025 Northern Michigan Wildcats football team |
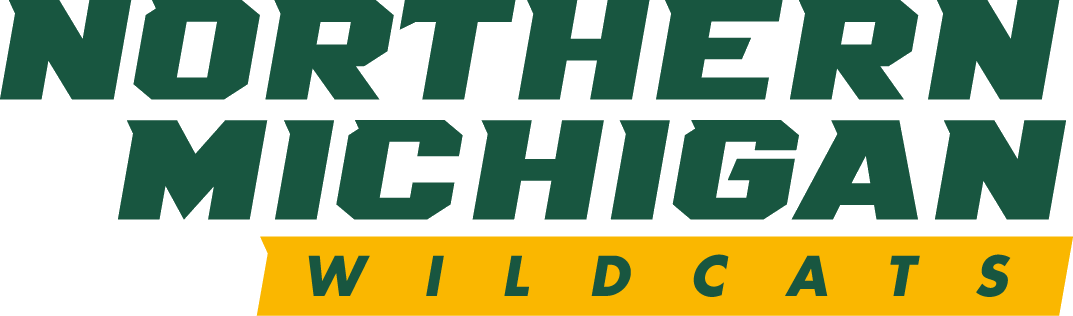
- First season: 1904; 122 years ago
- Athletic director: Rick Comley
- Head coach: Matt Janus; 1st season, 2–9 (.182)
- Location: Marquette, Michigan
- Stadium: Superior Dome (capacity: 8,000)
- NCAA division: Division II
- Conference: Great Lakes Intercollegiate Athletic Conference (GLIAC)
- Colors: Green and gold

NCAA Division II championships
- 1975

Conference championships
- 1987
- Rivalries: Michigan Tech (rivalry)
- Fight song: NMU Fight Song
- Mascot: Wildcat Willy
- Marching band: Wildcat Marching Band (aka: The Pride of the North)
- Website: nmuwildcats.com/football

The Northern Michigan Wildcats football program is the intercollegiate American football team for the Northern Michigan University located in the U.S. state of Michigan.

== Championships ==
=== National championships ===
| Year | Association | Division | Head coach | Record | Opponent | Result |
|---|---|---|---|---|---|---|
| 1975 | NCAA (1) | Division II (1) | Gil Krueger | 13–1 | Western Kentucky | W, 16–14 |

== Postseason appearances ==
=== NAIA ===
The Wildcats made two appearances in the NAIA playoffs, with a combined record of 0–1–1.

| Year | Round | Opponent | Result |
|---|---|---|---|
| 1960 | Semifinals | Lenoir Rhyne | T, 20–20 |
| 1967 | Semifinals | Fairmont State | L, 7–21 |

=== NCAA Division II ===
The Wildcats have made seven appearances in the NCAA Division II playoffs, with a combined record of 6–6. They were national champions in 1975.

| Year | Round | Opponent | Result |
|---|---|---|---|
| 1975 | Quarterfinals; Semifinals; National Championship | Boise State; Livingston; Western Kentucky | W, 24–21; W, 28–26; W, 16–14 |
| 1976 | Quarterfinals; Semifinals | Delaware; Akron | W, 28–17; L, 26–29 |
| 1977 | Quarterfinals | North Dakota State | L, 6–20 |
| 1980 | Quarterfinals | Santa Clara | L, 26–27 |
| 1981 | Quarterfinals | Elizabeth City State; Southwest Texas State | W, 55–6; L, 0–62 |
| 1982 | Quarterfinals | UC Davis | L, 21–42 |
| 1987 | Quarterfinals; Semifinals | Angelo State; Portland State | W, 23–20 ^{OT} L, 7–13 |

== Retired numbers ==
| Inducted | Player | Position | Years With Team | # |
|---|---|---|---|---|
| October 11, 2025 | Steve Mariucci | QB | 1974–1977 | 18 |
| | Tom Schwalbach | QB | 1956–1959 | 17 |
| | Curtis W. Marker | OL | 1964–1966 | 75 |

== Notable former players ==
There have been many notable former players for Northern Michigan Wildcats football including 22 NFL Draft Picks List of Northern Michigan Wildcats in the NFL draft. Some of the notable former players are:

- Steve Avery
- Lloyd Carr
- Jerry Glanville
- Phil Kessel
- Chuck Klingbeil
- Todd Krueger
- Mark Maddox
- Steve Mariucci
- Jim Rathje
- Robert Saleh
- Len St. Jean
- Jake Witt
- Tim Kearney
- Jan Quarless
- Bob Kroll
- Bobby Jurasin
- Howard Schultz
- Nick Baumgartner
