= Celebrating the Arts =

Artwork by Narendra M. Patel

- Artist: Narendra M. Patel
- Year: 1989
- Dimensions: 610 cm × 430 cm × 91 cm (240 in × 168 in × 36 in)
- Location: W. Walnut St. and N. 8th St., Milwaukee; 43°03′10.51″N 87°55′17.71″W

Celebrating the Arts is a public artwork by Indian artist Narendra M. Patel located at the Roosevelt Creative Arts Middle School, which is in Milwaukee, Wisconsin, United States. The sculpture is an abstract form created from over two tons of steel sheets welded together. It is 20' high x 14' wide x 6' deep and was constructed in 1989.

== Description ==
The unsigned abstract sculpture consists of steel triangular forms welded together and rising from three different points. The piece is bolted to three concrete bases and painted red and black. The form is large enough for children to move around it and through it. There is a plaque nearby that reads: Celebrating the Arts/ Created by Narendra Patel/ as a tribute to/ Linda Nice/ Beloved Music teacher/ Roosevelt Middle School of the Arts/ Dedicated on October 12, 1989. Celebrating the Arts was originally lit at night, but the fixtures were vandalized and had to be removed.

== Information ==
Celebrating the Arts is a site-specific work prompted by a teacher at what was then known as the Roosevelt Middle School of the Arts. "When Linda Nice, one of the Roosevelt School of the Arts' original and most popular music teachers, died in October 1988, she left a small sum of money ($5000) to commission a sculpture for the school. The bequest sparked the Milwaukee public schools to make a commitment to the concept of sculpture as part of a school environment." The Milwaukee Public Schools proceeded to add the funds needed for the foundation, the lighting and the landscaping. Narendra M. Patel, one of Linda Nice's close friends, was commissioned to create the sculpture. Professor Patel worked on the piece at the University of Wisconsin–Milwaukee's sculpture studio, where he taught. Other departments at the university contributed to the project with engineering advice.

The abstract geometric stabile form was dedicated on October 12, 1989. Many of Linda Nice's former students attended the celebration, which included student dancers performing around the sited sculpture. The sculpture is currently administered by the Milwaukee Public Schools, Facilities and Maintenance Services.

== Artist ==
Narendra M. Patel was born in 1929. He attended the University of Baroda in India, where he received an art degree. In the early 1960s, Patel and his wife moved to Michigan. He received his Master of Arts in sculpture from Wayne State University and a Master of Fine Arts from the Cranbrook Academy of Art in 1967. Patel moved to Milwaukee where he taught, and became professor emeritus, at the University of Wisconsin-Milwaukee. "He is known for his sculpture and the innovative technique of chemically changing colors on metal." He has works around the city including a sculpture on the Milwaukee Riverwalk, a sculpture at the Sixth District police station, and two low-relief bronze plaques at the Milwaukee County War Memorial Center. Professor Patel is also known for landscape paintings on metal, which are collected throughout the United States and India.

== See also ==
- Jantar-Mantar
