= Jantar-Mantar =

Artwork by Narendra Patel

- Artist: Narendra Patel
- Type: concrete
- Location: Milwaukee, Wisconsin; 43.075393°N 87.885644°W
- Owner: University of Wisconsin-Milwaukee

Jantar-Mantar is a public art work by sculptor Narendra Patel, located on the campus of the University of Wisconsin–Milwaukee (UWM) on the east side of Milwaukee, Wisconsin.

== Description ==
Jantar-Mantar is a monumental sculpture of cast concrete located near the College of Engineering and Applied Science building on the west end of the UWM campus. The sculpture's title references the astronomical observation structures constructed in eighteenth century Jaipur, India. The work was created by UWM sculpture professor Narendra Patel in collaboration with an engineering faculty member and a crew of student workers. According to UWM art history department faculty member Kenneth Bendiner, the sculpture is created from a "newly patented concrete" made from recycled "tires, coal slag and whatnot."

A 12-member crew constructed the work over four months.

== See also ==
- Celebrating the Arts – Artwork by Narendra M. Patel
