= Phil Kessel (American football) =

American football player (born 1958)

Profile
- Position: Quarterback

Personal information
- Born: April 28, 1958 (age 68); Ann Arbor, Michigan, U.S.
- Listed height: 6 ft 2 in (1.88 m)
- Listed weight: 197 lb (89 kg)

Career information
- High school: James Madison Memorial (Madison, Wisconsin)
- College: Northern Michigan
- NFL draft: 1981: 10th round, 257th overall pick

Career history
- Washington Redskins (1981); Calgary Stampeders (1982); Birmingham Stallions (1984)

Philip Joseph Kessel Sr. (born April 28, 1958) is an American former professional football quarterback. After being selected by the Washington Redskins of the National Football League (NFL) in 1981, he later played for the Calgary Stampeders of the Canadian Football League (CFL) and for the Birmingham Stallions of the United States Football League (USFL). He played college football at Northern Michigan University.

He spent the entire 1981 NFL season on injured reserve and was released by the Redskins on August 16, 1982.

Kessel is the father of National Hockey League (NHL) player Phil Kessel.
