= Jack F. Reichert =

American chairman and CEO (1930-2004)

- Born: September 27, 1930; West Allis, Wisconsin, U.S.
- Died: May 9, 2004 (aged 73); Lake Forest, Illinois, U.S.
- Education: University of Wisconsin–Milwaukee, 1957; Harvard University, 1970
- Occupations: Chairman and CEO of Brunswick Corp
- Spouse: Corrine Reichert
- Children: Susan Reichert Milanak, John Reichert

Jack F. Reichert (September 27, 1930 — May 9, 2004) was the retired chairman and CEO of Brunswick Corp, who made Brunswick a global leader, and helped the company "develop a presence that was virtually synonymous with the bowling and marine industries, two of the pillars of Brunswick’s current world leadership in recreation and leisure".

== Biography ==
Reichert was born in 1930 in West Allis, Wisconsin and was the youngest child of Arthur and Emily Reichert. His father Arthur was a championship bowler, who died when Reichert was only 13. To help support his family, he worked as a pinsetter at a bowling alley owned by his father's 1932–33 Greater Wisconsin Doubles champions partner.

During the Korean War, Reichert served in the army. He attended University of Wisconsin–Milwaukee and graduated with a bachelor's degree in 1957 and became a salesman for Brunswick Corp. He was promoted to vice president of marketing in the Mercury Marine Division in 1971, and become the division president the next year and group executive and corporate vice president two years later. In 1977, he was elected president and chief operating officer and was named to its board of directors. In 1982, Reichert was named the company's CEO and board chairman three years later.

He was widely credited with powering Brunswick and bowling to enormous popularity in the 1960s, more than tripling the number of bowling lanes in the United States. In 1986, Reichert acquired two pleasure-boat manufacturers, Bayliner Marine Corporation and Ray Industries for $773 million. Along with other acquisitions, he made Brunswick the world's largest manufacturer of pleasure boats and marine engines.

Reichert retired from Brunswick in 1996 at the mandatory retirement age of 65 and died of pancreatic cancer at age 73 in Lake Forest.

His wife Corrine later died in 2021 at age 93 in Lake Forest.

== Education ==
- University of Wisconsin–Milwaukee, BA 1957
- Harvard University Graduate School of Business AMP program, 1970.

== Legacy ==
- The Reichert Foundation
- Jack F. Reichert Business Scholarships at University of Wisconsin–Milwaukee is named after him.
- The Reichert learning center at the International Bowling Museum and Hall of fame

== See also ==
- Brunswick Corporation
