= Raquel Rutledge =

American newspaper reporter

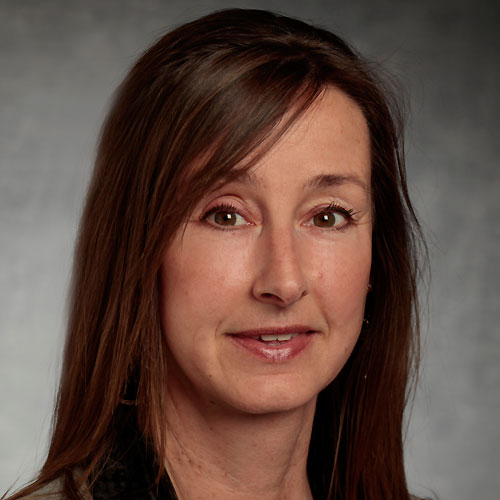
- Notable works: Milwaukee Journal Sentinel

Raquel Rutledge is a Pulitzer Prize-winning American investigative journalist working at The Examination, an independent nonprofit newsroom that investigates preventable health threats across the globe. Rutledge has edited projects that revealed risks from lead battery plants in Africa(named a Loeb finalist), unscrupulous 'influencer' dieticians, oil companies belching hydrogen sulfide gas into Texas communities (recognized by Investigative Reporters and Editors) and the tobacco industry's push for flavored cigarettes across Latin America.

Previously, Rutledge was an investigative reporter at the Milwaukee Journal Sentinel. Her investigations uncovered government benefits fraud, public health risks, workplace safety issues, tax oversight failures, malfeasance in undercover federal law enforcement stings, life-threatening dangers of alcohol poisoning at resorts in Mexico, and a disproportionate fire risk faced by renters living in Milwaukee's most distressed neighborhoods.

In April 2010, she won the Pulitzer Prize for Local Reporting for a yearlong series for the Journal Sentinel that exposed widespread fraud in the "Wisconsin Shares" child-care system. The series also won the 2010 Goldsmith Prize for Investigative Reporting. Her work also won the Worth Bingham Prize for Investigative Reporting and 2009 George Polk Awards.

Rutledge was awarded the Nieman Fellowship at Harvard University in 2011, studying food regulation and its impact on public health. In 2012, she led an investigation into a Wisconsin company responsible for distributing tainted alcohol wipes nationwide, that were ultimately linked to the death of a 2-year-old boy in Texas. That series, "Shattered Trust" won the 2012 Gerald Loeb Award for Medium & Small Newspapers.

Rutledge also co-authored an investigation into the Bureau of Alcohol, Tobacco, Firearms and Explosives’ use of undercover storefront stings that exposed how agents mishandled operations across the country utilizing people with intellectual disabilities and later charging them with crimes. The “Backfire” investigation was recognized in 2014 with the top award in the print/online category from the Investigative Reporters and Editors organization among other awards.

In 2015, Rutledge uncovered how a chemical known to cause deadly lung disease is endangering coffee workers and those who use e-cigarettes. That series, “Gasping for Action,” was awarded two top prizes from the Society of American Business Editors and Writers and a 2016 James Aronson Award for Social Justice Journalism. Rutledge researched the Gasping for Action series while on the O'Brien Fellowship in Public Service Journalism at Marquette University.

In 2017, Rutledge exposed dangers from alcohol poisoning faced by unsuspecting tourists visiting resorts in Mexico. After the mysterious death of a Wisconsin college student in a resort swimming pool, Rutledge uncovered widespread problems with tainted alcohol, derelict law enforcement, price gouging from hospitals — and warnings to others muzzled by TripAdvisor. The series prompted demands for action from Congress and was recognized with the American Legion's Fourth Estate Award among other national recognition.

Rutledge led an investigation in 2021 revealing the disproportionate risk facing Black renters in Milwaukee's most economically burdened neighborhoods and how officials were doing little to fix the problem. Reporters hired an electrical inspector to do what the city was not and found in a statistically valid study that as many as 80% of the residents in the area were living in housing with an elevated risk of electrical fire. The "Wires and Fires" series was honored as a 2022 finalist for the Pulitzer Prize for Public Service. It also was a Goldsmith Prize for Investigative Reporting finalist and won honors from Investigative Reporters and Editors and Society of Professional Journalists.

Rutledge was a Visiting Distinguished Professor at the University of Arkansas Center for Ethics in Journalism in fall 2021.

In 2022, Rutledge and Ken Armstrong, an investigative reporter from ProPublica, published 'The Landlord and Tenant,' which revealed two systems of justice — one for wealthy landlords and another for poor renters — that collided in a horrific fire in Milwaukee. The work was honored as best feature by the American Society of Magazine Editors and the Dart Award for Excellence in Coverage of Trauma.

== Life ==
Rutledge is Milwaukee native. She graduated from Shorewood High School and the University of Wisconsin–Milwaukee. Before joining the Milwaukee Journal Sentinel in 2004, she had worked for the Waukesha Freeman and the Colorado Springs Gazette.
