= Todd Krueger =

American football player (born 1957)

Profile
- Position: Quarterback

Personal information
- Born: September 10, 1957 (age 69); Stoughton, Wisconsin, U.S.
- Listed height: 6 ft 4 in (1.93 m)
- Listed weight: 260 lb (118 kg)

Career information
- High school: Marquette
- College: Northern Michigan
- NFL draft: 1980: 8th round, 202nd overall pick

Career history
- Buffalo Bills (1980); Arizona Wranglers (1983)

Todd A. Krueger (born September 10, 1957) is an American former professional football player who was a quarterback for one season with the Arizona Wranglers of the United States Football League (USFL). He played college football for the Northern Michigan Wildcats. He was selected by the Buffalo Bills in the eighth round (202nd overall) of the 1980 NFL Draft.
