= Thomas Vogl =

German radiologist

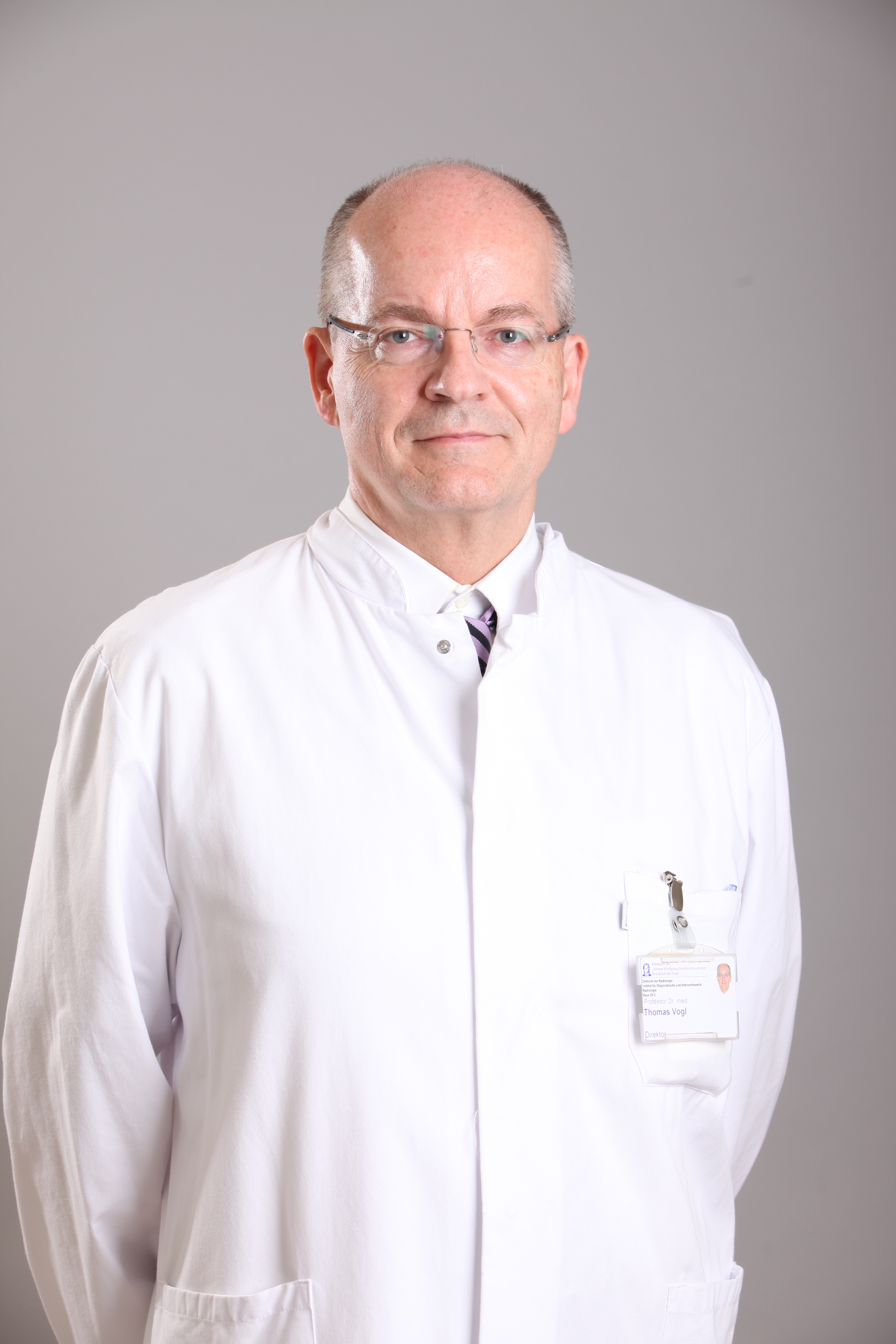
Thomas J. Vogl

Thomas Joseph Vogl (born 17 May 1958, Munich) is a world-reowned German radiologist. He is a professor for radiography at the University of Frankfurt and director of the Institute for Diagnostic and Interventional Radiology at the University Hospital Frankfurt/Main. Vogl's work is in the fields of interventional oncology, vascular procedures, multidetector computed tomography (MDCT), magnetic resonance imaging (MRI), evaluation of contrast agent and MR-guided procedures.

== Biography ==
In 1993 Vogl was appointed professor for general radiology at the Charité, Berlin. He was approved as neuroradiologist and became visiting professor at the Jinan University in China in 1996. In 1998 he was appointed professor for general radiation diagnostics at the University of Frankfurt/Main. There he leads the Institute for Diagnostic and Interventional Radiology since 1998. He was visiting professor at the University of Charleston. Since 2005 Vogl is deputy medical director of the Institute for Diagnostic and Interventional Radiology at the University Hospital Frankfurt/Main. He is its clinical chairman.

== Scientific contribution ==
Vogl's scientific focal points are interventional oncology, vascular procedures, ablative procedures such as laser-induced thermotherapy (LITT), ablation (MWA), radiofrequency ablation (RFA), multidetector computed tomography (MDCT), magnetic resonance imaging (MRI), evaluation of contrast agent, MR-guided procedures With patented practices of new procedures of laser induced thermotherapy and technique of chemoembolization (TACE) Vogl introduced new procedures for interventional radiology. Actually he also deals with multiple sclerosis, aiming a new therapy with „Ballooning“.

== Controversies ==
Vogl's experimental treatments, especially chemoembolization, have attracted many patients from abroad, pushing a Canadian health authority to emphasize that "there is no available evidence about the efficiency of chemoembolization to support its recommendation instead of systemic chemotherapy" and Quebec Health Minister Gaétan Barrette to accuse him of "selling hope".

Vogl admitted working closely with the Hallwang Clinic, a controversial institution known for selling unproven and ineffective therapies alongside more conventional cancer treatments.
