= Brett Peters =

University Dean

Brett A. Peters

Dean of the College of Engineering and Applied Science at the University of Wisconsin–Milwaukee
- Incumbent
- Assumed office September 1, 2012
- Preceded by: Tien-Chien Jen (interim)

Personal details
- Education: University of Arkansas; Georgia Institute of Technology
- Profession: Industrial engineer, educator, administrator
- Institutions: Texas A&M University; University of Wisconsin–Milwaukee

Brett A. Peters is an American industrial engineer and the current dean of the College of Engineering and Applied Science at the University of Wisconsin–Milwaukee. He has held this position since September 1, 2012. Prior to his appointment at UW-Milwaukee, Peters chaired the industrial and systems engineering department at Texas A&M University.

== Background ==
Peters received a bachelor of science degree in industrial engineering from the University of Arkansas in 1987. He completed a masters of science degree in industrial engineering at the Georgia Institute of Technology in 1988, followed by a Ph.D. in industrial and systems engineering at Georgia Tech in 1992. He was a professor of industrial and systems engineering at Texas A&M University from 1992 through 2011, serving as the department chair from 2002 through 2011. His appointment as dean of the College of Engineering and Applied Science at UW-Milwaukee by chancellor Michael Lovell in 2012 filled the position vacated when Lovell was appointed chancellor in April 2011. Peters' research interests include manufacturing systems, facilities logistics and planning, and sustainability in manufacturing. He is a Fellow of the Institute of Industrial Engineers.
