= William D. Haseman =

American computer scientist (died 2019)

William David Haseman (2 April 1948 - 2 December 2019) was an American computer scientist who was an expert in Management Information Systems and Wisconsin Distinguished Professor of MIS of University of Wisconsin–Milwaukee (UWM). His expertise is Internet-based technologies.

He was the director of SBA Center for Technology Innovation at the University of Wisconsin–Milwaukee and was the Conference Chair of the 1999 AIS National Conference and is the conference chair for the premiere International Conference on Information Systems 2006. Before taking the job at UMW he taught at Carnegie Mellon University.

== Personal ==
Haseman's wife's name was Barbara and they had four children together. He earned his MBA from the UWM and his PhD from Purdue University.

== Publications ==
=== Books and chapters ===
- "Introduction to Data Management", (with A.B. Whinston), Richard D. Irwin, Inc., 1977.
- "Design of an Integrated Medical Database," (with P. De), Chapter in Applied Systems Research and Cybernetics, G. E. Lasker (ed.), Pergamon Press, 1981.
- "The Quality of Financial Reporting by General Local Governments: An Empirical Study," (with R. Strauss), Chapter in Objectives of Accounting and Financial Reporting for Governmental Units: A Research Study, Vol. II, NCGA Research Report, 1981.
- "Introduction to Multimedia: Presentations and the Internet", William D. Haseman, Academic Press.
- "Emerging Information Technology - On Line Guide", William D. Haseman, An online book, 2000.
- "The Influences of the Degree of Interactivity on user-Oucomes in a Multimedia Environment: An Empirical Investigation", (with V. Polatoglu and K. Ramamurthy), Advanced Topics in Information resources Management, Volume 2, 2003, Ed. by M. Khosrow-Pour, Idea Group Publishing.

=== Articles ===
- "Water Quality Management and Information Systems" (with A. Lieberman and A.B. Whinston), Journal of Hydraulics Division, American Society of Civil Engineers, March, 1975, pp. 477–493.
- "A Data Base for Nonprogrammers," (with A.B. Whinston), Datamation, May, 1975, pp. 101–107.
- "A Partial Implementation of the CODASYL DBTG Report as an Extension to Fortran," (with J.F. Nunamaker and A.B. Whinston), Management Datamatics, October, 1975.
- "Information Systems for Public Sector Management," (with A.B. Whinston), Annals of Economic and Social Measurement, January, 1976.
- "Design of Multidimensional Accounting Information Systems," (with A.B. Whinston), Accounting Review, January, 1976.
- "O.R. Data Base Interface--An Application to Pollution Control," (with C. Holsapple and A.B. Whinston), Journal of Computing and Operations Research, Vol. 3, Nos. 2-3, 1976.
- "Security for the GPLAN System," (with J. Cash and A.B. Whinston), International Journal of Information Systems, August, 1976.
- "Automatic Application Program Interface to a Data Base," (with A.B. Whinston), The Computer Journal, May, 1977.
- "Review of Public Budgeting Systems", by Robert D. Lee, Jr. and Ronald W. Johnson, in Accounting Review, April, 1978.
- "Toward an Optimal Design of a Network Database from Relational Descriptions," (with P. De and C. Krieble), Operations Research, Vol. 26, No. 5, 1978, pp. 805–823.
- Review of MIS Concepts and Design, by Robert G. Murdick, in Accounting Review, April, 1981.
- "Four Schema Approach: An extended Model for Database Architecture," (with P. De and Y. So), Information Systems, Volume 6, No. 2, 1981, pp. 117–124.
- "Data Base Design for Decision Support Systems: A Medical Example," (with P. De, J. Fedorowicz, and M. Golibersuch), Policy and Analysis and Information Systems, Vol. 6, No. 4, 1982, pp. 325–349.
- "An Extended Model for Database Implementation (P. De and C. Kriebel), Information Systems, Vol. 7, No. 7, 1982, pp. 139-145.
- "An Integrated Database Design for Accounting Systems," (with P. De), Information Processing and Management, Vol. 20, No. 4, 1984, pp. 507–518.
- "An Optimal Access Path Handling Strategy in a Data Base Environment" (with Y. Uckan), Journal of Systems and Software, 6, 1986, pp. 237–249.
- "Connectivity of Disjoint End-User Communities," (with F. Groom and D. Hale), 3rd-place winner in the 1988 Society For Information Management Jury Paper Competition, MIS-Q, December 1989.
- "Implementation of an Interface to Multiple Databases ", (with Towell), Database Management, Spring 1995
- "Semantic Resolution in Multi-Database Environments", (with Towell), Database Management, Summer 1995.
- "Migrating Corporate Legacy Systems to Distributed Platforms", (with Groom), Annual Review of Communications, 1994–95, Vol. XLVIII, 455-462
- "User Attitude as a Mediator to Learning Performance Improvement in an Interactive Multimedia Environment: An Empirical Investigation of the Degree of Interactivity", (with Kettanurak, V., and K. Ramamurthy), International Journal of Human-Computer Studies (IJHCS), 54, 2001, 541-583.
- "An Empirical Investigation of the Influences of the Degree of Interactivity on User-Outcomes in a Multimedia Environment", (with V. Kettanurak, and K. Ramamurthy), Information Resources Management Journal, Volume 15, No.2, April–June 2002, 31-48.

== Grants ==
- Principal Investigator, Congressional Budgetary Research, funded by C-MU Public Policy Institute.
- Principal Investigator, Computer-Aided Instruction in Accounting and Management Information Systems, funded by Touche Ross Foundation.
- Principal Investigator, Design of Optimal Data Base Structures, funded by National Science Foundation.
- Principal Investigator, Distributed Data Base Design, funded by National Science Foundation, transferred from CMU to UWM July, 1980.
- Project Director (with D. Sholund), Cash Flow Study: State of Wisconsin, funded by National Science Foundation.
