= Dennis R. Glass =

American businessman

- Born: 1949 (age 76–77)
- Education: University of Wisconsin–Milwaukee, BA, MBA
- Occupations: President and CEO of Lincoln National Corporation
- Spouse: Deborah
- Children: 2

Dennis R. Glass (born 1949) is the former president and CEO of Lincoln National Corporation. He also served as the chairman of the board of the American Council of Life Insurers.

Glass was formerly the president and CEO of Jefferson Pilot Corporation, which merged with Lincoln Financial Group in 2006. Before joining Jefferson Pilot Corporation in 1993, he held executive-level finance and investment positions with Protective Life and Northwestern Mutual. He became the president and chief operating officer of Lincoln Financial Group in April 2006 and was appointed as Lincoln Financial's CEO in 2007. He retired from his position as Lincoln Financial’s CEO in May 2022. He is succeeded by Ellen Cooper. Now, Glass is serving as chairman of the Lincoln National Corporation board.

Glass is a graduate of the University of Wisconsin–Milwaukee, where he obtained his B.A. and MBA degrees in business administration in 1971 and 1973.
