= Madeline Wade =

American physicist

Madeline C. Wade is an American astrophysicist who participates in the LIGO Scientific Collaboration in analyzing gravitational wave data from black hole mergers. She is an associate professor of physics at Kenyon College.

== Education and career ==
Wade majored in physics at Bates College, graduating with honors in 2009 under the mentorship of Eric Wollman. Her undergraduate studies also included a semester at the Danish Institute for Study Abroad in Copenhagen. She continued her studies at the University of Wisconsin–Milwaukee, where she completed her Ph.D. in 2015. Her dissertation, Gravitational-wave science with the Laser Interferometer Gravitational-Wave Observatory, was jointly supervised by Jolien Creighton and Xavier Siemens.

She joined Kenyon College as an assistant professor of physics in 2015 and was promoted to associate professor in 2021. From 2019 to 2022 she was Harvey F. Lodish Junior Faculty Development Professor in the Natural Sciences.

== Recognition ==
Wade was elected as a Fellow of the American Physical Society (APS) in 2021, after a nomination from the APS Division of Gravitational Physics, "for important contributions to and leadership of the low-latency calibration of LIGO data that played a vital role in the discovery of gravitational waves, of the electromagnetic follow-up of gravitational wave transients, and to multimessenger astronomy with GW170817".

She has also shared in the many honors awarded to the LIGO Collaboration, including the Princess of Asturias Award, Gruber Prize in Cosmology, and Breakthrough Prize in Fundamental Physics.

== Personal life ==
Wade is married to Leslie Wade, another gravitational physicist at Kenyon College.
