= Gale E. Klappa =

Gale E. Klappa is the current chairman and chief executive officer of WEC Energy Group. Before joining Wisconsin Energy, Klappa was the executive vice president, chief financial officer and treasurer of Southern Company in Atlanta, Georgia. He has also served as chief strategic officer for Southern Company; president and CEO of South Western Electricity

Klappa is also the chairman of the finance committee and vice chairman of the board of directors of Nuclear Electric Insurance Limited, and the director of the Edison Electric Institute and the American Gas Association. He was elected to Badger Meter Board in 2010.

He graduated cum laude from the University of Wisconsin–Milwaukee in 1972, with a bachelor's degree in mass communications. He also serves as a member of the Advisory Council of the University's business school.

In August 2019, Klappa was awarded Best CEO | Electricity and Natural Gas Industry’ & ‘Growth Strategy CEO of the Year – USA at the CEO Awards 2019 by Business Worldwide Magazine.
