= Jean Schwarzbauer =

American molecular biologist

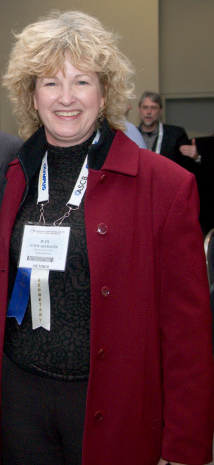
- Citizenship: United States
- Education: University of Wisconsin-Milwaukee; University of Wisconsin at Madison
- Known for: Fibronectin
- Spouse: Donald A. Winkelmann
- Scientific career
- Workplaces: Princeton University

Jean E. Schwarzbauer is an American molecular biologist currently the Eugene Higgins Professor of Molecular Biology at Princeton University. A cited expert in her field, Schwarzbauer's interests are kidney fibrosis, tissue regeneration and repair, cartilage development and tumor formations.

== Education ==
She earned her Ph.D. in Molecular Biology from University of Wisconsin at Madison and her B.S. in chemistry from University of Wisconsin-Milwaukee.

== Selected publications ==
- Miller CG, Budoff G, Prenner JL, Schwarzbauer JE. Minireview: Fibronectin in retinal disease. Exp Biol Med (Maywood). 2017; 242(1):1-7
- Goyal R, Vega ME, Pastino AK, Singh S, Guvendiren M, Kohn J, et al. A periplasmic polymer curves vibrio. J Biomed Mater Res A. 2017; 105(8):2162-2170.
- Vega ME, Schwarzbauer JE. Collaboration of fibronectin matrix with other extracellular signals in morphogenesis and differentiation. Curr Opin Cell Biol. 2016; 42:1-6.
- Pastino AK, Greco TM, Mathias RA, Cristea IM, Schwarzbauer JE. Stimulatory effects of advanced glycation endproducts (AGEs) on fibronectin matrix assembly. Matrix Biol. 2016
- Schwarzbauer JE, W Leader M, Drubin DG. Setting the bar for cell biology best practices. Mol Biol Cell. 2016; 27(18):2803
- Harris GM, Madigan NN, Lancaster KZ, Enquist LW, Windebank AJ, Schwartz J, et al. Nerve Guidance by a Decellularized Fibroblast Extracellular Matrix. Matrix Biol. 2016
