= Jim Rathje =

American football player (born 1952)

Profile
- Position: Running back

Personal information
- Born: November 7, 1952 (age 74); USA
- Listed height: 6 ft 0 in (1.83 m)
- Listed weight: 218 lb (99 kg)

Career information
- College: Northern Michigan
- NFL draft: 1974: 9th round, 211th overall pick

Career history
- Detroit Wheels (1974)

James Alan Rathje (born November 7, 1952) is a former professional American football running back who played for Detroit Wheels in World Football League (WFL). He played college football at Northern Michigan University. He was selected by the New York Giants in the 9th round (211th overall pick) of the 1974 NFL draft.

He later was a coach.
