= Mukta Farooq =

Indian metallurgical engineer

Mukta Ghate Farooq
- Education: IIT Bombay; Northwestern University; Rensselaer Polytechnic Institute

Mukta Ghate Farooq is an Indian metallurgical engineer of Marathi descent working for the IBM Corporation in Hopewell Junction, New York. She was named a Fellow of the Institute of Electrical and Electronics Engineers (IEEE) in 2016 for her contributions to 3D integration and interconnect technology. She is currently a Distinguished Research Scientist at IBM Research and has over 250 issued US patents including patent numbers 10199315, 20180061749, and 8367543. In 2017, IIT Bombay awarded her the notable alumna award

== Education ==
Mukta received her B.Tech. degree in Metallurgical Engineering from IIT Bombay in 1983. Farooq got her master's degree from Northwestern University in Materials Science in 1985 and got her Ph.D. in materials science from Rensselaer Polytechnic Institute in 1988.

== Distinctions ==
Dr. Mukta Ghate Farooq was recognized for numerous achievements throughout her educational career, including the Gold Medal Award for undergraduate achievements from the Indian Institute of Foundry (1982), the Dorab Tata Scholarship award (1983), the J.N. Tata Endowment Scholarship (1983), and the IBM Fellowship Award for doctoral studies (1986 - 1988). In 1988, she was nominated to Alpha Sigma Mu, a professional honor society affiliated with ASM International.

In her professional career, Farooq received the Best Paper Award at the IMAPS International Conference (2006), the Technology All Star Award from National Women of Color in STEM (2008), and was designated an IEEE EDS Distinguished Lecturer in 2012. In 2014, she became an IBM Lifetime Master Inventor and was appointed to the IBM Academy of Technology. She also received the Outstanding Technical Achievement Award for 3D Technology Integration in 2015.

In 2016, Dr. Farooq was named a Fellow of the Institute of Electrical and Electronics Engineers (IEEE). Shortly thereafter, in 2017, she was awarded Bombay's Distinguished Alumnus/Alumna Award from her undergraduate institution, the Indian Institute of Technology Bombay. In 2016, she was named a GLOBALFOUNDRIES Fellow. In 2023, she was the sole recipient of the IEEE EDS J.J Ebers Award, the highest technical award given by the Electron Devices Society.

== Works ==
As of 2022, Farooq was the author of 227 granted U.S. patents, earning her a place on the List of Prolific Inventors. She has also authored a number of lectures, conference papers, and journal articles on subjects including heterogeneous integration for artificial intelligence, 3D TSV integration and Pb-free ceramic ball grid array (CBGA) assemblies.
