= CFL (disambiguation) =

CFL is the Canadian Football League, a professional sports league in Canada.

CFL may also refer to:

== Football leagues ==
- Bohemian Football League, (Czech: Česká fotbalová liga), in the Czech Republic
- Calcutta Football League, in India
- Central Football League, in Scotland
- Cheshire Football League, in England
- Constantinople Football League, (defunct) Ottoman Empire
- Continental Football League, in North America
- Czechoslovak First League, in Czechoslovakia
- Montenegrin football leagues:
  - Montenegrin First League (Montenegrin: Prva crnogorska fudbalska liga; 1. CFL)
  - Montenegrin Second League (Montenegrin: Druga crnogorska fudbalska liga; 2. CFL)

== Football organizations ==
- Chinese Professional Football League, in China

== Language ==
- Chinese as a foreign language
- College of Foreign Languages, Vietnam National University, Hanoi
- Commission on the Filipino Language, a Philippine language regulator

== Politics ==
- Campaign for Liberty, an American libertarian organization
- Connecticut for Lieberman, an American political party
- Council of Four Lands, the central body of Jewish authority in Poland from 1580 to 1764

== Science and technology ==
- Color–flavor locking
- Compact fluorescent lamp/light
- Compressed file library
- Context-free language
- Courant–Friedrichs–Lewy condition

== Trade unions ==
- Ceylon Federation of Labour, Sri Lanka
- Chicago Federation of Labor, United States
- Chinese Federation of Labour, Taiwan

== Transportation ==
- Contraflow Left, a type of road junction
- Caledonian MacBrayne, a Scottish ferry operator

=== Railways ===
- Caminhos de Ferro de Luanda, Angola
- Chemin de fer Lanaudière, Canada
- Compagnie du chemin de fer du Congo supérieur aux Grands Lacs africains, Belgian Congo
- Société Nationale des Chemins de Fer Luxembourgeois, Luxembourg
