= Donald George Vogl =

American artist (born 1929)

Donald George Vogl (born 1929 in Milwaukee) is a prolific artist and retired art professor from the University of Notre Dame. His art is on display in permanent collections at Notre Dame's Snite Museum of Art, Indianapolis Museum of Art, Midwest Museum of American Art-Elkhart, Haggerty Museum of Marquette University Milwaukee, Brauer Museum at Valparaiso University, Blank Center for the Arts in Michigan City, and South Bend Museum of Art. He's listed in Who's Who in American Art 1988-2010.

== Career ==
Vogl received a bachelor's in art education from the Art Institute of Chicago at the University of Chicago in 1957 and a Master of Science in Art Education from the University of Wisconsin–Milwaukee in 1958.

He taught painting and printmaking as Associate Professor of Art at the University of Notre Dame from 1963 to 1994.
