= Scott Yanoff =

American computer programmer (born 1969)

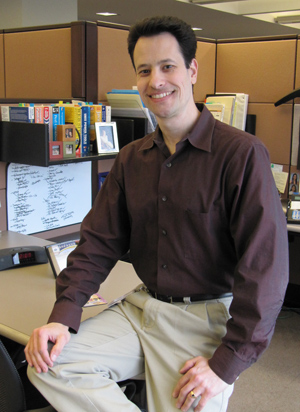
Scott Yanoff

Scott Yanoff (born October 20, 1969) is an IT manager and web developer who was a key person in the early days of the internet, most notably for creating and maintaining the Yanoff List, an alphabetical list of internet sites.

== Career ==
Yanoff authored the Inter-Network Mail Guide, a text written in 1997 documenting the different methods of sending email from one network to another. He was also a co-author of The Web Site Administrator's Survival Guide with Jerry Ablan, a book that explains how to set up, administer, care for, and feed your own Web server. Most of this work was accomplished as an undergraduate student at the University of Wisconsin–Milwaukee, while working as a mainframe/UNIX consultant for the university.

He has worked for SpectraCom, Inc., and the now-defunct Strong Capital Management in Menomonee Falls, Wisconsin and at Northwestern Mutual in Milwaukee, Wisconsin from February, 2004 to June, 2023.

=== The Yanoff List ===
In the early and mid-1990s, before the use of search engines, the Yanoff List became an important tool for internet users. The list consisted of internet sites listed alphabetically and grouped by subject acting as a type of internet yellow pages containing hundreds of FTP, gopher, and web locations relevant to each subject. Users of the internet in the early 1990s would eagerly await the latest version of this list. As a minor tribute to his service, a popular Palm-based newsreader, Yanoff, was named after him.

=== Additional work ===
Yanoff created a visual basic script called "iTunesStats" in 2008 that can be run on Windows-based computers to generate a file of statistics of one's listening habits based upon the user's iTunes library. Additionally, he transposed popular music guitar tablature in the 1990s including that of The Beatles, R.E.M., Bruce Springsteen, and U2.
