= Y. Austin Chang =

American material engineer and academic

Y. Austin Chang (Chinese: 張永山; pinyin: Zhāng Yǒngshān; 1932–2011) was a material engineering researcher and educator. He was a Wisconsin Distinguished Professor Emeritus, a member of the National Academy of Engineering, a foreign member of the Chinese Academy of Sciences, Fellow of the Minerals, Metals and Materials Society, and Fellow of ASM International.

Chang received his B.S. from University of California, Berkeley, and M.S. degree from University of Washington, Seattle, both in Chemical Engineering. He obtained his Ph.D. in metallurgy from UC-Berkeley.

He had been on the faculty of Materials Science and Engineering at University of Wisconsin–Madison since 1980. He was appointed Wisconsin Distinguished Professor in 1988 and currently the Wisconsin Distinguished Professor Emeritus. He served as chairs of two materials engineering departments at University of Wisconsin–Milwaukee (1971–77) and University of Wisconsin–Madison (1982–91) for a total of 15 years.

He also served as board member, vice president and the 2000 president of TMS, trustee of ASM and AIME, the national president of Alpha Sigma Mu and a National Honor Society for students in MS&E.
