= Michael Dhuey =

Michael Joseph Dhuey (born July 20, 1958, in Milwaukee, Wisconsin, United States) is an electrical and computer engineer.

== Information ==
He is chiefly known as the co-creator (with Ron Hochsprung) of the Macintosh II computer in 1987, the first Macintosh computer with expansion slots. He was also one of the two hardware engineers (with Tony Fadell) who developed the hardware for the original iPod in 2001, particularly the battery.

He began programming at age 14 at the University of Wisconsin–Milwaukee and by age 15 was working professionally as a programmer at Northwestern Mutual Life Insurance. He received his computer engineering degree in 1980 from the University of Wisconsin-Madison. He worked at Apple Computer from 1980 to 2005. He is currently employed at Cisco Systems, where he has worked on the Cisco TelePresence remote conferencing system.

Design News nominated him for "Engineer of the Year" in 2006 and 2007.
