= GRAEF =

Graef-USA, Inc.
- Type: Private
- Industry: Engineering
- Founded: 1961
- Founder: Luther W. Graef, Leonard Anhalt, Robert Schloemer
- Headquarters: Milwaukee, Wisconsin, United States
- Key people: John H. Kissinger (President and CEO)
- Website: www.graef-usa.com

GRAEF is a private industry engineering and consulting firm based in Milwaukee, Wisconsin, servicing civil, construction management, environmental and landscape architecture, MEP/commissioning, operations consulting, planning, structural, survey, and transportation industries. GRAEF was founded in 1961 by Luther W. Graef, Leonard Anhalt and Robert Schloemer.

Based in Milwaukee, GRAEF also has offices located in Madison and Green Bay, Wisconsin; Chicago Loop and O'Hare, Chicago, Illinois; Minneapolis, Minnesota; and Orlando, and Miami, Florida.

== Company Leadership ==
Five individuals have served as president and CEO of GRAEF since 1961, including the three founders. John Kissinger currently holds the position as president and CEO of the Milwaukee headquarters. He was appointed January 1, 2012 and succeeded Richard (Rich) Bub, who held the position from 1995-2011. Bub is currently chairman of the board for the firm.

== Projects ==
In Milwaukee, where GRAEF is headquartered, developments the firm has been involved in include the Milwaukee Art Museum, Harley Davidson Museum, Midwest Airlines Center, Intermodal Station, General Mitchell International, Grand Avenue Mall, Marcus Amphitheater, State Fair Exposition Center, Pettit National Ice Center, Bayshore Town Center, the Bradley Center, and the University of Wisconsin-Milwaukee.

Statewide, GRAEF has been involved in the Lambeau Field reconstruction, Madison’s Hilton Hotel at Monona Terrace and the State Capitol Building, Lawrence University’s student center, and buildings on the University of Wisconsin-Madison campus, including the Children’s Hospital.

Projects in Chicago include the I-94/I-294 capacity expansion, Camp John Paul Jones Multiple Recruit Barracks, the McCormick Place West Expansion, Silver Cross Hospital, Palos Community Hospital and ISTHA Open Road Tolling.

In Orlando, projects include the Fannie Road Bridge over Dead Lake and Ed Smith Stadium.

== Awards ==
- 2012 ENR Top National Design Firms
- 2012 Giants 300 Engineering/Architecture Firms
- 2011 Building Design + Construction Top Green Design Firms
- 2011 BD+C Top Reconstruction/Renovation Design Firms
- 2007 BD+C Top 100 Industrial Design Firms

== Markets ==
GRAEF has worked on projects in the following development markets:

- Airports
- Bridges
- Chemicals
- Commercial Development
- Education
- Energy
- Foods
- Government
- Healthcare
- Land and water resources
- Manufacturing
- Municipal
- Printing
- Residential
- Sports and recreation
- Transportation
- Water/wastewater
