= Jake Witt =

American football player (born 2000)

No. 76
- Position: Offensive tackle

Personal information
- Born: February 7, 2000 (age 26); Bruce Crossing, Michigan, U.S.
- Listed height: 6 ft 7 in (2.01 m)
- Listed weight: 302 lb (137 kg)

Career information
- High school: Ewen-Trout Creek (MI)
- College: Michigan Tech (2018); Northern Michigan (2019–2022)
- NFL draft: 2023: 7th round, 236th overall pick

Career history
- Indianapolis Colts (2023)
- Stats at Pro Football Reference

Jake Witt (born February 7, 2000) is an American former professional football offensive tackle. Witt played college football for the Northern Michigan Wildcats and was drafted by the Indianapolis Colts of the National Football League (NFL). He was a tight end with Northern Michigan before a position change during the 2021 season. He had previously played college basketball at Michigan Tech.

== Early life ==
Witt was born on February 7, 2000. He grew up in the small town of Bruce Crossing, Michigan which is located east of Duluth by three hours and south of Lake Superior by approximately 30 minutes. The town did not have any football teams, not even pee-wee youth leagues. He began playing basketball in second grade and continued through high school.

Witt was a standout athlete at Ewen-Trout Creek High School, at which he played basketball and track, and, starting as a junior, football. He played for the school's eight-man football team (they did not have a full team, as they did not have enough players) and playing wide receiver, recorded 102 receptions in 18 games while being named all-state. Witt initially received attention from colleges for basketball, but he generated interest from schools for football as well. As a senior, he concentrated on basketball and he was subsequently named the Upper Peninsula Mr. Basketball. He finished his high school career with over 1,000 points scored and over 1,000 rebounds. Witt was valedictorian of his class.

== College career ==
=== Michigan Tech ===
After graduating from high school, Witt had a decision to make about college – not just about which to attend, but also about what sports to play. "[It] came down to Michigan Tech for basketball, Northern Michigan [NMU] for football or [to] take my preferred walk-on spot at Central Michigan," he later said. "So two of my final three choices were football. But I decided to go the basketball route." Witt announced his commitment to Michigan Tech in November 2017, and played his first season in 2018, posting an average of 6.4 points-per-game. According to The Athletic, he "appeared to have a bright future" with the team, but as a sophomore decided to change his major, which also meant in his case changing schools.

=== Northern Michigan ===
Witt transferred to NMU, and started pursuing a sports and fitness management degree. After not playing sports for a year, he decided he wanted to try out football again in 2020. He joined the team at tight end but soon after the season was canceled due to COVID-19. The following year, with activities being resumed, he played but was mainly used as a blocker, having compiled only 79 receiving yards on six catches through the year's first eight matches.

At halftime during their mid-season game against the eventual national champions Ferris State, Witt was told that he needed to play offensive lineman because of injuries to NMU teammates. He was selected because no one else wanted to play the position, and because his size (6 ft 7 in [2.01 m], 265 lb [120 kg]) made him the best player for the position among remaining members of the team. He had never played the position before, but "after 10 minutes of coaching Jake to play a whole new position, he allowed zero sacks or pressures against the best defensive line in the country," said coach Dylan Chmura. It took "five or six" practice repetitions for him to get the correct stance, and that was the only preparation Witt had before he went up against undefeated Ferris State and their lineman Caleb Murphy, among the top players in Division II.

"The film was silly," Witt later said. "I looked like a basketball player out there trying to defend someone. I didn't know what else to do." He played the last two games of the year as NMU's starting right tackle and after the season his coaches decided he would stay on the line for 2022, although on the left side, instead of the right. Witt gained 15 pounds to prepare for the 2022 season and appeared in 11 games, all as a starter. In December 2022, he declared for the NFL draft.

== Professional career ==
Pre-draft measurables
Height	Weight	Arm length	Hand span	40-yard dash	10-yard split	20-yard split	20-yard shuttle	Three-cone drill	Vertical jump	Broad jump	Bench press
6 ft 7 1/8 in (2.01 m)	302 lb (137 kg)	33 1/2 in (0.85 m)	10 1/8 in (0.26 m)	4.89 s	1.71 s	2.76 s	4.62 s	7.44 s	37.0 in (0.94 m)	10 ft 3 in (3.12 m)	22 reps

Witt declined an opportunity to participate in the College Gridiron Showcase, as he wanted more time to prepare himself to show his talents to National Football League (NFL) teams. Although not invited to the NFL Scouting Combine, he began receiving attention from NFL teams after impressing at his pro day. Witt's 4.89-second 40-yard dash would have placed first at the combine for his position, as well as his 37-inch (94 cm) vertical jump; additionally, his 10-foot-3-inch (3.12 m) broad jump would have been the longest for a lineman in the past decade. He also was given a Relative Athletic Score (RAS) of 9.92, which was the 11th-best out of 1,233 offensive tackles going back to 1987.

In the 2023 NFL draft, Witt was selected in the seventh round, 236th overall, by the Indianapolis Colts, the first Wildcat drafted since Mark Maddox in 1991. He was placed on season-ending injured reserve on August 5, 2023 with a hip injury.

On August 27, 2024, Witt was released by the Colts. After being released, Witt announced his retirement from football.

== After football ==
Witt currently works as the Health and Wellness Coach at the Lac Vieux Desert Health Center in Watersmeet, MI.
