= Cheng Xu =

Chinese-American aerodynamicist (born 1968)

- Born: April 11, 1968 (age 58); Huangshan City, Anhui, China
- Education: Nanjing University of Aeronautics and Astronautics
- Occupation: Aerospace engineer
- Known for: Aerodynamic design for Turbomachinery
- Children: 3
- Scientific career
- Fields: Aerodynamic design, axial / centrifugal compressor design, axial turbine design, Computational Fluid Dynamics, turbomachinery

Cheng Xu is a Chinese American aerodynamic design engineer and engineering manager. He is a Fellow of the American Society of Mechanical Engineers and a member of the Technical Committee on Energy and Power Systems, IASTED. He also served as a guest editor of International Journal of Rotating Machinery.

Xu has made important contributions to the three-dimensional aerodynamic design and turbomachinery research. He is one of the foremost pioneers of the three-dimensional centrifugal compressor impeller, diffuser design, axial compressor blade design, turbine blade, turbine endwall optimization with efficiency and cooling effectiveness, and gas turbine LPT and nozzle optimization in the field of turbomachinery. He has performed advanced aerodynamic research and applied his research results to industry turbomachinery design. He developed a three-dimensional viscous optimization design procedure for industry turbomachinery aerodynamic and heat transfer design. He was one of the pioneers that helped develop high efficiency and wide operating range centrifugal compressor and axial compressor compressors. He has published many papers in peer-reviewed academic journals and refereed conferences. In 2006, Xu was awarded the 2006 Best Paper Award from ASME for his paper A study of Single Stage Centrifugal Compressor. His papers are also cited widely by many researchers.

== Biography ==
Xu attended the Nanjing University of Aeronautics and Astronautics and received an MS in aerodynamics in 1992. That same year, he became an assistant professor at the same college. In 1994, he went to Singapore where he proceeded to receive a PhD in mechanical and production engineering from the Nanyang Technological University. He moved to Milwaukee, Wisconsin in 1998 where he studied for a PhD in turbomachinery from the University of Wisconsin, Milwaukee.

After he graduated in 2000, he began work as an aerodynamic development engineer for General Electric Energy in Schenectady, New York. In 2004, he moved to North Carolina to work as a principal engineer for Ingersoll-Rand in Cornelius, North Carolina, where he worked to make many of his advances and discoveries in the field of turbomachinery. In 2007, he was hired as an engineering manager in Honeywell and then promoted to a chief engineer in 2011. In 2012, he was hired as a senior staff engineer to work for General Electric in Mason, Ohio.

== Selected publications ==
=== Academic and professional journals ===
- Cheng Xu and W. W. H. Yeung, Discrete Vortex Method for Airfoil with Unsteady Separated Flow. AIAA Journal of Aircraft, Nov.-Dec. 1996.
- W. W. H. Yeung, Cheng Xu and W. Gu, Reduction of transient adverse effects of spoilers, AIAA Journal of Aircraft, May–June, 1997.
- W. W. H. Yeung and Cheng Xu, Separated Flows around Spoilers and Forward-Facing Flaps, AIAA Journal of Aircraft, January-Feb. Vol.35, 1998.
- Cheng Xu and W. W. H. Yeung, Numerical Study of Unsteady Flow around Airfoil with Spoiler, ASME Journal of Applied Mechanics, Vol.65, No. 1.1998.
- Cheng Xu, W. W. H. Yeung and R. W. Guo, Inviscid and viscous simulation of spoiler performance, The Aeronautical Journal, Aug/Sept. 1998.
- Cheng Xu and W.W.H.Yeung, Aerodynamic characteristics of moving spoilers, AIAA Journal of Aircraft, Vol. 36, May/June, 1999.
- C. Xu, and Amano, R.S., Computational Analysis Of Pitch-Width Effects On The Secondary Flows Of Turbine Blades, Computational Mechanics, Vol. 34, No. 2, 2004, pp. 111–120.
- Xu, C., Amano, R.S., and Lee, E.K., Investigation of an Axial Fan-Blade Stress and Vibration Due to Pressure Field Measurement, JSME International Journal, Series B, Vol. 47, No. 1, 2004, pp. 75–90.
- Xu C, Amano, R.S. and Perez, R.A., Experimental Study on Unsteady Pressure Field Investigation of an Axial Fan: Inlet and Outlet Unsteady Pressure Field Measurement, International Journal of Rotating Machinery, Vol. 8, No. 6, 2002, pp. 375–383.
- Xu C and Amano, R.S., Experimental Study on Unsteady Pressure Field Investigation of an Axial Fan: Blade Unsteady Pressure Field Measurement, International Journal of Rotating Machinery, Vol. 8, No. 6, 2002, pp. 385–395.
- Xu C. and Amano, R.S., Flux-Splitting Finite Volume Method for Turbine Flow and Heat Transfer Analysis, Computational Mechanics, 2001, Vol. 27, no. 2, pp. 119–127.
- Xu, C. and Amano, R.S., A Hybrid Numerical Procedure for Cascade Flow Analysis, Numerical Heat Transfer, Part B, 2000, Vol. 37, No. 2, pp. 141–164.
- Cheng Xu and R. S. Amano, An Implicit scheme for cascade flow and heat transfer analysis, ASME Journal of Turbomachinery, April, 2000.
- Cheng Xu and Michael Muller, Development and Design of a Centrifugal Compressor Volute, 2005, International Journal of Rotating Machinery, 2005, issue 3. Pages 190–196.
- Cheng Xu, Design experience and considerations for centrifugal compressor development, proc. IMech E, Vol.221 Part G: J. Aerospace Eng. 2007. pp273–286.
- C. Xu and R. S. Amano, “Computational Analysis of Swept Compressor Rotor Blades” International Journal for Computational Methods in Engineering Science and Mechanics, 9:374–382, 2008
- C. Xu; R. S. Amano, Development of a Low Flow Coefficient Single Stage Centrifugal Compressor, International Journal for Computational Methods in Engineering Science and Mechanics, Volume 10 Issue 4 2009, Pages 282 – 289.
- C. Xu; R. S. Amano, The Development of a Centrifugal Compressor Impeller, International Journal for Computational Methods in Engineering Science and Mechanics, Volume 10 Issue 4 2009, Pages 290 – 301.
- C. Xu, R. S. Amano, On the Development of Turbomachine Blade Aerodynamic Design System, International Journal for Computational Methods in Engineering Science and Mech, Vol. 10, No. 3, pp. 186–196. 2009.
- C. Xu and Amano, computational Analysis of Scroll Tongue Shape to Compressor Performance by Using Different Turbulence Models, International Journal for Computational Methods in Engineering Science and Mechanics, Vol.11 No.2, 85-99, 2010
- C. Xu, R. S. Amano, Study of the flow in centrifugal compressor, International Journal of Fluid Machinery and System, Vol.3 No.3, 2010. pp. 260–270.
- C. Xu, R. S. Amano, Empirical Design Considerations for Industrial Centrifugal Compressors, International Journal of Rotating Machinery, Volume 2012, 2012.
- C. Xu, R. S. Amano, Meridional considerations of the centrifugal compressor development, International Journal of Rotating Machinery, Volume 2012, 2012.
- C. Xu, R. S. Amano, Centrifugal compressor design impacts: lean and meridional shape, international journal of fluid machinery and systems, 2014.
- C. Xu and R.S. Amano, "Effects of asymmetric radial clearance on performance of a centrifugal compressor", J. Energy Resour. Technol.140(5), pp. 052003-0520016, doi:10.1115/1.4038387..
- C. Xu, R. S. Amano, 2017, “Centrifugal Compressor Performance Improvements Through Impeller Splitter Location”, J. Energy Resour. Technol 140(5), 051201–0512016, doi: 10.1115/1.4037813.

=== Journal editorial ===
- International Journal of Rotating Machinery
- http://www.hindawi.com/journals/ijrm/2012/370425/

=== US patents ===
- Volute for a centrifugal compressor, US Patent. US 7604457 B2. https://patents.google.com/patent/US7604457
- Diffuser for a centrifugal compressor, US Patent. US7581925 B2. https://patents.google.com/patent/US7581925
- Impeller for a centrifugal compressor, US Patent. US 7563074 B2. https://patents.google.com/patent/US7563074
- Blade features for turbocharger wheel, US Patent. US20120269636. https://patents.google.com/patent/US20120269636
- Hub features for turbocharger wheel, US Patent. US20120269635. https://patents.google.com/patent/US20120269635
