= Justin Marlowe =

American academic (born 1978)

Justin Marlowe (born June 24, 1978) is a professor at the Harris School of Public Policy at the University of Chicago. He is an expert on public finance and budgeting. He has published four books and more than 50 articles on topics such as: capital budgeting and finance, state and local tax policy, public pension liabilities, public health systems finance, government financial disclosure, and public-private partnerships. In 2018, Marlowe was elected as a fellow of the National Academy of Public Administration.

== Early life and education ==
Marlowe was born in Iron River in the Upper Peninsula of Michigan and grew up in Pulaski, Wisconsin. He attended Northern Michigan University (BA and MPA) and the University of Wisconsin-Milwaukee (Ph.D.).

== Career ==
Before coming to the University of Chicago he was a professor at the University of Kansas and the University of Washington.

== Selected publications ==
- "Public Money" - column (every-other-month) in Governing magazine
- Governing Guides to Financial Literacy. Guides to public finance
- Municipal Bonds and Infrastructure Development: Past, Present, and Future - report for the International City/County Management Association and Government Finance Officers Association
- Capital Budgeting: A Guide for Local Governments. 2nd ed. (with Bill Rivenbark and Jack Vogt) (2009). ICMA.

In 2016 he co-authored the first free, open source textbook on public financial management, Financial Strategy for Public Managers.
