= Pradeep Rohatgi =

Indian materials scientist

Pradeep K. Rohatgi
- Born: 14 August 1943 (age 81); Kanpur, United Provinces, British India

Pradeep K. Rohatgi (born 14 August 1943) is a professor of materials engineering, and director of the Center for Composites at the University of Wisconsin–Milwaukee.

== Education and career ==
In India Institute of Technology, Kanpur he pioneered incorporating renewable materials such as coir(fiber from coconut shell), banana and sial plant fiber into composites. "The solidification processing of metal-matrix composites: The Rohatgi Symposium." This first creation of a cast metal matrix composite material is considered a landmark in the 11,000-year history of metal casting Rohatgi served as founding director of the Regional Research Laboratories (CSIR) at Trivandrum and Bhopal, and as a professor at the Indian Institute of Science and the Indian Institute of Technology, Kanpur, where he worked on incorporating renewable materials such as coir (fiber from the coconut shell), and banana and sisal plant fibers into polymer composites.

== Honors and achievements ==
Rohatgi has been elected as a Fellow of the American Society for Metals, Institute of Metals, Institute of Ceramics, Institution of Engineers, American Association for the Advancement of Science, and the Third World Academy of Sciences. He has been a consultant to several industries as well as to the government of India, the state governments of Kerala and Madhya Pradesh, the World Bank and the United Nations on science, technology and development. Rohatgi has coauthored and edited eleven books, including the first monograph on biomimetic self-healing materials. In March 2006, he was honored by the holding of a "Rohatgi Honorary Symposium" on Solidification Processing of Metal Matrix Composites by The Minerals, Metals & Materials Society (TMS) in San Antonio, Texas. Rohatgi was inducted into the Wisconsin Academy of Arts, Sciences & Letters in 2014.
