= Luther W. Graef =

American civil engineer

Luther W. Graef is the founder of Graef, Anhalt, Schloemer and Associates Inc., former President of American Society of Civil Engineers (ASCE) and the fourth president of ASCE Foundation.

Graef graduated from Marquette University in 1952. After he finished his MS in civil engineering from University of Wisconsin–Milwaukee, he and three partners founded the consulting engineering firm of Graef, Anhalt, Schloemer and Associates Inc. Graef also served on the industrial advisory committee of several UW system schools, including the Department of Civil and Environmental Engineering at University of Wisconsin–Madison.

He was awarded the Outstanding Professional Engineer in Private Practice Award, and the Engineer of the Year Award by the Wisconsin Section of the American Society of Professional Engineers in 1976 and in 1983.
