= Tim Kearney (American football) =

American football player (born 1950)

No. 56, 50
- Position: Linebacker

Personal information
- Born: November 5, 1950 (age 76); Kingsford, Michigan, U.S.
- Listed height: 6 ft 2 in (1.88 m)
- Listed weight: 227 lb (103 kg)

Career information
- High school: Kingsford
- College: Northern Michigan
- NFL draft: 1972: 4th round, 83rd overall pick

Career history
- Dallas Cowboys (1972)*; Green Bay Packers (1972)*; Cincinnati Bengals (1972–1974); Kansas City Chiefs (1975); Tampa Bay Buccaneers (1976); St. Louis Cardinals (1976–1981)
- * Offseason or practice squad member only

Awards and highlights
- Second-team Little All-American (1971)

Career NFL statistics
- Sacks: 4.5
- Fumble recoveries: 10
- Interceptions: 3
- Interception yards: 30
- Stats at Pro Football Reference

Timothy Edward Kearney (born October 5, 1950) is an American former professional football player who was a linebacker in the National Football League (NFL) for the Cincinnati Bengals, Kansas City Chiefs, Tampa Bay Buccaneers and St. Louis Cardinals. He played college football for the Northern Michigan Wildcats.

== Early life ==
Kearney attended Kingsford High School. He accepted a scholarship from Northern Michigan University. He was a three-year starter at linebacker. As a senior, he received Little All-American honors in 1971.

In 1982, he was inducted into the Northern Michigan University Sports Hall of Fame.

== Professional career ==
=== Dallas Cowboys ===
Kearney was selected in the fourth round (83rd overall) of the 1972 NFL draft by the Dallas Cowboys, who were the defending Super Bowl champions. He faced a difficult challenge in making the team, after the Cowboys drafted a total of 5 linebackers and had one of the best linebacking corps in NFL history already in place. He was waived on September 7, 1972.

=== Green Bay Packers ===
The Green Bay Packers claimed him off waivers on September 11, 1972, but was waived three days later to make room for wide receiver Jon Staggers.

=== Cincinnati Bengals ===
Kearney was claimed off waivers by the Cincinnati Bengals on September 15, 1972. He was a special teams player while backing up Bill Bergey at middle linebacker.

On September 1, 1975, he was traded along with Bernard Jackson to the Detroit Lions in exchange for a draft choice, but the transaction was canceled after both players failed their respective physical exams and Kearney was released.

=== Kansas City Chiefs ===
He was claimed off waivers by the Kansas City Chiefs on September 5, 1975 to backup Willie Lanier. He was waived on September 6, 1976, after his role was taken over by rookie Jimbo Elrod.

=== Tampa Bay Buccaneers ===
Kearney was signed by the Tampa Bay Buccaneers on September 13, 1976. He was inactive for one game, before being released on September 20.

=== St. Louis Cardinals ===
The St. Louis Cardinals signed him in 1976 to replace an injured Greg Hartle. The team at the time was known in the media as the "Cardiac Cardinals". He became a starter at inside linebacker in the team's 3-4 defense, leading the Cardinals in tackles in 1978 and 1980.

In 1979, he was placed on the injured reserve list with a knee injury after the fifth game of the season. He was released on May 20, 1982, after failing a physical exam with a neck injury.

== Personal life ==
His daughter is former Miss Missouri USA Katie Kearney.
