= List of members of the National Academy of Engineering (materials) =

This list is a subsection of the List of members of the National Academy of Engineering, which includes members and international members of the United States National Academy of Engineering, living and deceased, each affiliated with one of the academy's disciplinary sections. Members are listed under their primary section, and each entry gives the person's name, primary institution, and election year. For deceased members, the year of death is noted.

== Materials ==
| Name | Institution | Year elected |
|---|---|---|
| Hubert I. Aaronson (died 2005) | Carnegie Mellon University | 1997 |
| John Alf Lennart Agren | KTH-Royal Institute of Technology | 2018 |
| Takuzo Aida | The University of Tokyo | 2021 |
| Joanna Aizenberg | Harvard University | 2019 |
| AbdulHameed AlHashem | Kuwait Institute for Scientific Research | 2021 |
| John E. Allison | University of Michigan | 2011 |
| Khalil Amine | Argonne National Laboratory | 2025 |
| Kevin R. Anderson | Mercury Marine | 2016 |
| Peter Louis Andresen | GE Global Research | 2013 |
| John C. Angus (died 2023) | Case Western Reserve University | 1995 |
| Thomas R. Anthony (died 2017) | GE Corporate Research and Development | 1990 |
| Diran Apelian | University of California, Irvine | 2009 |
| Ali S. Argon (died 2019) | Massachusetts Institute of Technology | 1989 |
| Barry Arkles | Gelest Inc. | 2021 |
| Roman F. Arnoldy (died 2002) | Triten Corporation | 1998 |
| Eduard Arzt | Leibniz Institute for New Materials (INM) | 2020 |
| Michael F. Ashby | University of Cambridge | 1990 |
| Aziz Ibrahim Asphahani | QuesTek Innovations, LLC | 2017 |
| Harry Albert Atwater Jr. | California Institute of Technology | 2015 |
| William O. Baker (died 2005) | Bell Laboratories, Lucent Technologies | 1975 |
| Anna C. Balazs | University of Pittsburgh | 2022 |
| Mari Lou Balmer-Millar | Caterpillar Inc. | 2026 |
| Zhenan Bao | Stanford University | 2016 |
| John Bardeen (died 1991) | University of Illinois Urbana-Champaign | 1972 |
| Craig R. Barrett | Intel Corporation | 1994 |
| Michael I. Baskes | University of North Texas | 2012 |
| Ray Baughman (died 2025) | The University of Texas at Dallas | 2008 |
| Moungi Gabriel Bawendi | Massachusetts Institute of Technology | 2026 |
| Peter Beardmore (died 2017) | Ford Motor Company | 1992 |
| Paul A. Beck (died 1997) | University of Illinois Urbana-Champaign | 1981 |
| Angela M. Belcher | Massachusetts Institute of Technology | 2018 |
| Arden L. Bement Jr. | Purdue University | 1983 |
| Mark G. Benz | Engineering Horizons International, LLC | 1999 |
| Howard K. Birnbaum (died 2005) | University of Illinois Urbana-Champaign | 1988 |
| Ilan A. Blech | Flexus Corporation | 2005 |
| Donald J. Blickwede (died 2011) | Bethlehem Steel Corporation | 1976 |
| William James Boettinger | National Institute of Standards and Technology | 2006 |
| Dawn A. Bonnell | University of Pennsylvania | 2013 |
| Ray H. Boundy (died 1992) | Independent Consultant | 1967 |
| Yves Jean Marc Brechet | Monash University | 2026 |
| Clyde L. Briant | Brown University | 2010 |
| Peter R. Bridenbaugh | University of South Florida | 1992 |
| J. Keith Brimacombe (died 1997) | University of British Columbia | 1997 |
| C. Jeffrey Brinker | The University of New Mexico | 2002 |
| Harvey Brooks (died 2004) | Harvard University | 1968 |
| Alfred E. Brown (died 2004) | Hoechst Celanese Corporation | 1975 |
| Walter L. Brown (died 2017) | Lehigh University | 1986 |
| Ronald Bullough (died 2020) | Independent Consultant | 2011 |
| Timothy Bunning | Air Force Research Laboratory | 2026 |
| Joseph E. Burke (died 2000) | GE Corporate Research and Development | 1976 |
| Spencer H. Bush (died 2005) | Review and Synthesis Associates | 1970 |
| John W. Cahn (died 2016) | University of Washington | 1998 |
| Robert D. Caligiuri | Exponent, Inc. | 2023 |
| Gerbrand Ceder | University of California, Berkeley | 2017 |
| Edwin A. Chandross | Materials Chemistry, LLC | 2007 |
| Y. Austin Chang (died 2011) | University of Wisconsin–Madison | 1996 |
| Praveen Chaudhari (died 2010) | Brookhaven National Laboratory | 1988 |
| Long-Qing Chen | The Pennsylvania State University | 2025 |
| Tze-Chiang Chen | IBM Research | 2025 |
| Stephen Z. D. Cheng | University of Akron | 2008 |
| John H. Chesters (died 1994) | Independent Consultant | 1977 |
| Yet-Ming Chiang | Massachusetts Institute of Technology | 2009 |
| Uma Chowdhry (died 2024) | E.I. du Pont de Nemours & Company | 1996 |
| Michael J. Cima | Massachusetts Institute of Technology | 2011 |
| David R. Clarke | Harvard University | 1999 |
| Jerome B. Cohen (died 1999) | Northwestern University - Evanston | 1993 |
| Morris Cohen (died 2005) | Massachusetts Institute of Technology | 1972 |
| Paul M. Cook (died 2020) | Promptu Corporation | 1985 |
| Alfred R. Cooper (died 1996) | Case Western Reserve University | 1996 |
| Alan Cottrell (died 2012) | University of Cambridge | 1976 |
| Alan William Cramb | Illinois Institute of Technology | 2014 |
| John J. Croat | John Croat Consulting | 2026 |
| L. Eric Cross (died 2016) | The Pennsylvania State University - University Park | 1983 |
| Charles Crussard (died 2008) | Pechiney (France) | 1976 |
| Jerome J. Cuomo | North Carolina State University | 1993 |
| Santosh K. Das | Polymer Technologies, Inc. | 2015 |
| Lance A. Davis | National Academy of Engineering | 1992 |
| Robert F. Davis | Carnegie Mellon University | 2001 |
| Delbert E Day | Missouri University of Science and Technology | 2004 |
| James J. De Yoreo | Pacific Northwest National Laboratory | 2022 |
| Raymond F. Decker | Thixomat, Inc. | 1980 |
| Alexa Ann Dembek | DuPont | 2025 |
| Steven P. DenBaars | University of California, Santa Barbara | 2012 |
| Joseph M. DeSimone | Stanford University | 2005 |
| Robert C. DeVries (died 2021) | GE Corporate Research and Development | 1998 |
| George E. Dieter (died 2020) | University of Maryland, College Park | 1993 |
| Allen F. Donovan (died 1995) | Independent Consultant | 1969 |
| Harry G. Drickamer (died 2002) | University of Illinois Urbana-Champaign | 1979 |
| Paul Stephen Drzaic | Apple | 2026 |
| Nancy J. Dudney | Oak Ridge National Laboratory | 2022 |
| David A. Duke (died 2017) | Corning Incorporated | 1992 |
| Carolyn Duran | Apple Inc. | 2024 |
| Thomas W. Eagar (died 2022) | Massachusetts Institute of Technology | 1997 |
| James Economy (died 2021) | University of Illinois Urbana-Champaign | 1987 |
| Daniel C. Edelstein | International Business Machines Corporation | 2011 |
| Manuel Elices | Polytechnic University of Madrid | 2004 |
| Adam James Ellison | Corning Incorporated | 2016 |
| J. David Embury | McMaster University | 2002 |
| Igor Emri | University of Ljubljana | 2020 |
| Jerald L. Ericksen (died 2021) | University of Minnesota, Minneapolis | 1993 |
| Anthony G. Evans (died 2009) | University of California, Santa Barbara | 1997 |
| Ersel A. Evans (died 2011) | Westinghouse Hanford Company | 1975 |
| Brian L. Eyre (died 2014) | University of Oxford | 2009 |
| Antonio Facchetti | Georgia Institute of Technology | 2025 |
| John C.C. Fan | Lightning Silicon Technology, Inc. | 2020 |
| Frank J. Feely Jr. (died 1995) | Exxon Corporation | 1979 |
| Linda S. Schadler Feist | University of Vermont | 2025 |
| Claudia Anna-Maria Felser | Max Planck Institute for Chemical Physics of Solids | 2020 |
| John D. Ferry (died 2002) | University of Wisconsin–Madison | 1992 |
| Morris E. Fine (died 2015) | Northwestern University - Evanston | 1973 |
| Yoel Fink | Massachusetts Institute of Technology | 2025 |
| Edith M. Flanigen (died 2026) | Independent Consultant | 1991 |
| Robert L. Fleischer (died 2011) | Union College | 1993 |
| Merton C. Flemings | Massachusetts Institute of Technology | 1976 |
| Paul A. Fleury | Yale University | 1996 |
| Gordon E. Forward (died 2018) | US Business Council for Sustainable Development | 1996 |
| Daniel W. Fox (died 1989) | General Electric Company | 1984 |
| Charles Frank (died 1998) | University of Bristol | 1980 |
| Katharine G. Frase | International Business Machines Corporation | 2006 |
| Peter Fratzl | Max Planck Institute of Colloids and Interfaces | 2021 |
| Jean M. Fréchet | University of California, Berkeley | 2000 |
| L. B. Freund (died 2024) | University of Illinois Urbana-Champaign | 1994 |
| Richard Henry Friend | University of Cambridge | 2013 |
| Richard J. Fruehan (died 2022) | Carnegie Mellon University | 1999 |
| Eric Edward Fullerton | University of California, San Diego | 2018 |
| David U. Furrer | Pratt & Whitney | 2023 |
| Tasuku Fuwa (died 2013) | Tohoku University | 1979 |
| Richard J. Gambino (died 2014) | MesoScribe Technologies, Inc | 2004 |
| Harry C. Gatos (died 2015) | Massachusetts Institute of Technology | 1983 |
| Alan Neville Gent (died 2012) | University of Akron | 1991 |
| Alexander F. Giacco (died 2013) | Rheometric Scientific | 1987 |
| John J. Gilman (died 2009) | University of California, Los Angeles | 1975 |
| Norman A. Gjostein (died 2006) | Ford Motor Company | 1990 |
| Alastair M. Glass | Tyndall National Institute | 1987 |
| Herbert Gleiter | Karlsruhe Institute of Technology (KIT) | 2004 |
| Martin E. Glicksman | Florida Institute of Technology | 1996 |
| Bruce Edward Gnade | The University of Texas at Dallas | 2026 |
| Mary L. Good (died 2019) | University of Arkansas at Little Rock | 1987 |
| John B. Goodenough (died 2023) | The University of Texas at Austin | 1976 |
| John M. Googin (died 1994) | Martin Marietta Energy Systems, Inc. | 1988 |
| Arthur C. Gossard (died 2022) | University of California, Santa Barbara | 1987 |
| Amit Goyal | State University of New York College at Buffalo | 2018 |
| Nicholas J. Grant (died 2004) | Massachusetts Institute of Technology | 1980 |
| George (Rusty) T. Gray III | Los Alamos National Laboratory | 2017 |
| Peter Fitzroy Green | National Laboratory of the Rockies | 2023 |
| Joseph E. Greene (died 2022) | University of Illinois Urbana-Champaign | 2003 |
| Charles D. Greskovich (died 2007) | CDG Ceramic Solutions | 2000 |
| Gary S. Grest | Sandia National Laboratories | 2008 |
| Alfred Grill | IBM Thomas J. Watson Research Center | 2012 |
| Robert Howard Grubbs (died 2021) | California Institute of Technology | 2015 |
| Karl A. Gschneidner Jr. (died 2016) | Iowa State University | 2007 |
| Supratik Guha | Argonne National Laboratory | 2015 |
| Peter Gumbsch | Karlsruhe Institute of Technology (KIT) | 2016 |
| Peter Haasen (died 1993) | University of Gottingen | 1981 |
| Georges Hadziioannou | Universite de Bordeaux | 2017 |
| Gene H. Haertling | Clemson University | 1995 |
| Horst W. Hahn | University of Arizona | 2017 |
| Naomi J. Halas | Rice University | 2014 |
| Eugene Ernest Haller (died 2018) | University of California, Berkeley | 2010 |
| N. Bruce Hannay (died 1996) | AT&T Bell Laboratories | 1974 |
| Niels Hansen (died 2021) | Technical University of Denmark | 1995 |
| Milton Harris (died 1991) | Gillette Company | 1976 |
| Julius J. Harwood (died 2014) | Ford Motor Company | 1977 |
| Craig J Hawker | University of California, Santa Barbara | 2021 |
| David Hays | 3M | 2026 |
| Siegfried S. Hecker | Texas A&M University | 1988 |
| James Lupton Hedrick | IBM Almaden Research Center | 2014 |
| Larry L. Hench (died 2015) | Florida Institute of Technology | 2000 |
| Mark Hersam | Northwestern University - Evanston | 2024 |
| Arthur H. Heuer | Case Western Reserve University | 1990 |
| Walter R. Hibbard Jr. (died 2010) | Virginia Polytechnic Institute and State University | 1966 |
| Julia S. Higgins | Imperial College London | 1999 |
| Mats H. Hillert (died 2022) | KTH-Royal Institute of Technology | 1997 |
| Peter B. Hirsch (died 2025) | University of Oxford | 2001 |
| John P. Hirth | Washington State University | 1974 |
| John D. Hoffman (died 2004) | Johns Hopkins University | 1980 |
| Elizabeth Ann Holm | University of Michigan | 2025 |
| Wei Huang | Northwestern Polytechnical University | 2023 |
| John K. Hulm (died 2004) | Westinghouse Electric Corporation | 1980 |
| Jennie S. Hwang | H-Technologies Group, Inc. | 1998 |
| Kazuo Inamori (died 2022) | Kyocera Corp. | 2000 |
| Akihisa Inoue | Josai International University | 2008 |
| F. Kenneth Iverson (died 2002) | Nucor Corporation | 1994 |
| Tatsuo Izawa | Chitose Institute of Science and Technology | 2004 |
| Kenneth A. Jackson (died 2022) | University of Arizona | 2005 |
| Frederick G. Jaicks (died 1998) | Inland Steel Company | 1979 |
| Noel Jarrett (died 2015) | Independent Consultant | 1979 |
| Lei Jiang | Chinese Academy of Sciences | 2016 |
| Sungho Jin | University of California, San Diego | 1999 |
| David W. Johnson Jr. | Bell Laboratories, Lucent Technologies | 1993 |
| James R. Johnson (died 2019) | Minnesota Mining & Manufacturing Company | 1972 |
| William L. Johnson | California Institute of Technology | 1999 |
| Bruce G. Johnston (died 1989) | University of Michigan | 1979 |
| Jan Kaczmarek (died 2011) | Polish Academy of Sciences | 1977 |
| Zakya H. Kafafi | Lehigh University | 2021 |
| John F. Kahles (died 1993) | Metcut Research Associates Inc. | 1984 |
| Frank E. Karasz | University of Massachusetts at Amherst | 1991 |
| Bernard H. Kear | Rutgers, The State University of New Jersey, New Brunswick | 1979 |
| Herbert H. Kellogg (died 2016) | Columbia University | 1978 |
| Anthony Kelly (died 2014) | University of Cambridge | 1986 |
| Thomas F. Kelly | Steam Instruments, Inc. | 2021 |
| W. David Kingery (died 2000) | University of Arizona | 1975 |
| Reiner Kirchheim | Universität Göettingen | 2017 |
| John F. Knott (died 2017) | University of Birmingham | 2003 |
| Carl C. Koch | North Carolina State University | 2013 |
| U. Fred Kocks (died 2023) | University of California, San Diego | 1999 |
| Jack L. Koenig (died 2022) | Case Western Reserve University | 2000 |
| William J. Koros | Georgia Institute of Technology | 2000 |
| Theresa Kotanchek | Evolved Analytics LLC | 2022 |
| Nicholas A. Kotov | University of Michigan | 2025 |
| Paul E. Krajewski | General Motors Research Laboratories | 2020 |
| Edward J. Kramer (died 2014) | University of California, Santa Barbara | 1989 |
| Charles T. Kresge | ChemSciConsulting, LLC | 2007 |
| Ondrej Ladislav Krivanek | Bruker AXS | 2025 |
| Thomas F Kuech | National Science Foundation | 2010 |
| Charles J. Kuehmann | SpaceX | 2019 |
| Doris Kuhlmann-Wilsdorf (died 2010) | Kuhlmann-Wilsdorf Motors | 1994 |
| Georgy V. Kurdjumov (died 1996) | Russian Academy of Sciences | 1977 |
| Charles R. Kurkjian (died 2023) | Rutgers, The State University of New Jersey, New Brunswick | 1994 |
| Max G. Lagally | University of Wisconsin–Madison | 2001 |
| Edwin H. Land (died 1991) | Rowland Institute for Science | 1965 |
| Frederick F. Lange (died 2010) | University of California, Santa Barbara | 1992 |
| Francis L. LaQue (died 1988) | International Nickel Inc. | 1985 |
| David C. Larbalestier | Florida State University | 2003 |
| Ronald M. Latanision | Purdue University | 1985 |
| Kei May Lau | The Hong Kong University of Science and Technology | 2024 |
| Robert A. Laudise (died 1998) | Bell Laboratories, Lucent Technologies | 1980 |
| Enrique J. Lavernia | Texas A&M University-College Station | 2013 |
| Alan Lawley (died 2017) | Drexel University | 1998 |
| Brian R. Lawn | National Institute of Standards and Technology | 2001 |
| Carlos Levi | University of California, Santa Barbara | 2023 |
| Jennifer A. Lewis | Harvard University | 2017 |
| James C.M. Li (died 2025) | University of Rochester | 2006 |
| Qinghuang Lin | Canon Nanotechnologies, Inc | 2024 |
| Don Mark Lipkin | Texas A&M University | 2025 |
| Bin Liu | National University of Singapore | 2022 |
| Chain T. Liu | City University of Hong Kong | 2004 |
| James Duane Livingston (died 2019) | Massachusetts Institute of Technology | 1994 |
| Luis M. Liz-Marzán | CICBIOMAGUNE | 2023 |
| Arthur S. Lodge (died 2005) | University of Wisconsin–Madison | 1992 |
| Andrew J. Lovinger | National Science Foundation | 2004 |
| Karen Lozano | Rice University | 2023 |
| Ke Lu | Chinese Academy of Sciences | 2018 |
| Fred E. Luborsky (died 2010) | GE Corporate Research and Development | 1985 |
| Frank W. Luerssen (died 2013) | Inland Steel Company | 1977 |
| Alan Luo | The Ohio State University | 2023 |
| Benjamin Lustman (died 2004) | Westinghouse Electric Corporation | 1968 |
| John W. Lyons (died 2024) | National Defense University | 1985 |
| John B. MacChesney (died 2021) | Bell Laboratories, Lucent Technologies | 1985 |
| Alan G. MacDiarmid (died 2007) | The University of Texas at Dallas | 2002 |
| John D. Mackenzie (died 2020) | University of California, Los Angeles | 1976 |
| William J. MacKnight | University of Massachusetts at Amherst | 1998 |
| Christopher W. Macosko | University of Minnesota, Minneapolis | 2001 |
| Subhash Mahajan (died 2023) | University of California, Davis | 2005 |
| William D. Manly (died 2003) | Oak Ridge National Laboratory | 1974 |
| Michele V. Manuel | University of Pittsburgh | 2022 |
| Tobin J. Marks | Northwestern University - Evanston | 2012 |
| David B. Marshall | University of Colorado | 2007 |
| David K. Matlock | Colorado School of Mines | 2003 |
| Sachio Matoba (died 1987) | Nippon Steel Corporation | 1988 |
| Shiro Matsuoka (died 2025) | Columbia University | 1989 |
| Krzysztof Matyjaszewski | Carnegie Mellon University | 2006 |
| Robert D. Maurer (died 2025) | Corning Incorporated | 1979 |
| John Christopher Mauro | The Pennsylvania State University | 2022 |
| James W. Mayer (died 2013) | Arizona State University | 1984 |
| David W. McCall (died 2002) | Bell Laboratories, Lucent Technologies | 1984 |
| James E. McGrath (died 2014) | Virginia Polytechnic Institute and State University | 1994 |
| Charles J. McMahon Jr. (died 2022) | University of Pennsylvania | 1980 |
| Robert Mehrabian | Teledyne Technologies Incorporated | 1984 |
| Robert D. Miller | IBM Almaden Research Center | 2009 |
| Chad A. Mirkin | Northwestern University - Evanston | 2009 |
| James W. Mitchell | Howard University | 1989 |
| Sumita B. Mitra | Mitra Chemical Consulting, LLC | 2021 |
| Leslie A. Momoda | HRL Laboratories, LLC | 2025 |
| Joseph B. Moore (died 2006) | United Technologies | 1986 |
| Paul W. Morgan (died 1992) | Independent Consultant | 1977 |
| John W. Morris Jr. | University of California, Berkeley | 2007 |
| David L. Morse | Corning Incorporated | 2010 |
| David Anthony Muller | Cornell University | 2026 |
| Donald W. Murphy | Retired-Other | 1998 |
| Christopher B. Murray | University of Pennsylvania | 2019 |
| Frank R. N. Nabarro (died 2006) | University of the Witwatersrand | 1996 |
| Tsuneo Nakahara (died 2016) | Sumitomo Electric Industries, Ltd. | 1999 |
| Omkaram Nalamasu | Applied Materials Inc. | 2017 |
| Jagdish Narayan | North Carolina State University | 2017 |
| Tina Nenoff | Sandia National Laboratories | 2024 |
| Marc S. Newkirk (died 2019) | The Lightfield Foundation | 1997 |
| Robert E. Newnham (died 2009) | The Pennsylvania State University - University Park | 1989 |
| Thuc-Quyen Nguyen | University of California, Santa Barbara | 2023 |
| Robin B. Nicholson (died 2024) | University of Exeter | 1983 |
| Zenji Nishiyama (died 1991) | Osaka University | 1982 |
| William D. Nix | Stanford University | 1987 |
| Christopher Kemper Ober | Cornell University | 2023 |
| Bruce S. Old (died 2003) | Bruce S. Old Associates, Inc. | 1968 |
| Warren Carl Oliver | KLA Corporation | 2016 |
| Gregory B. Olson | Massachusetts Institute of Technology | 2010 |
| Elburt F. Osborn (died 1998) | The Pennsylvania State University - University Park | 1968 |
| Gordon C. Osbourn | Sandia National Laboratories | 2002 |
| Yuri A. Ossipyan (died 2008) | Russian Academy of Sciences | 1993 |
| Walter S. Owen (died 2007) | Massachusetts Institute of Technology | 1977 |
| Un-Chul Paek (died 2011) | Gwangju Institute of Science and Technology | 1998 |
| Thomas O. Paine (died 1992) | Thomas Paine Associates | 1973 |
| John Williams Palmour (died 2022) | Wolfspeed, Inc. | 2022 |
| Earl R. Parker (died 1998) | University of California, Berkeley | 1969 |
| Stuart S. P. Parkin | Max Planck Institute of Microstructure Physics | 2009 |
| Joseph A. Pask (died 2003) | University of California, Berkeley | 1975 |
| Neil E. Paton | Independent Consultant | 2002 |
| Donald R. Paul | The University of Texas at Austin | 1988 |
| Harold W. Paxton (died 2021) | Carnegie Mellon University | 1978 |
| Paul S. Peercy (died 2016) | University of Wisconsin–Madison | 2001 |
| Alan W. Pense (died 2022) | Lehigh University | 1993 |
| John H. Perepezko | University of Wisconsin–Madison | 2004 |
| Kristin A. Persson | UC Berkeley | 2025 |
| George M. Pharr IV | Texas A&M University | 2014 |
| Julia M. Phillips | Sandia National Laboratories | 2004 |
| R. Byron Pipes | Purdue University | 1987 |
| Tresa M. Pollock | University of California, Santa Barbara | 2005 |
| Thalappil Pradeep | Indian Institute of Technology - Madras | 2024 |
| William R. Prindle (died 2016) | Corning Incorporated | 1990 |
| Nathan E. Promisel (died 2005) | Independent Consultant | 1978 |
| Gary R. Purdy | McMaster University | 2003 |
| Paul E. Queneau (died 2012) | Dartmouth College | 1981 |
| Dierk Raabe | Max Planck Institute for Sustainable Materials | 2025 |
| Ramamoorthy Ramesh | University of California, Berkeley | 2011 |
| Palle R. Rao | International Advanced Research Centre for Powder Metallurgy and New Materials (ARCI) | 2012 |
| Robert A. Rapp | The Ohio State University | 1988 |
| Bhakta B. Rath | U.S. Naval Research Laboratory-Washington, D.C. | 2008 |
| Elsa Reichmanis | Lehigh University | 1995 |
| Kenneth L. Reifsnider | University of South Carolina | 2004 |
| Maureen Theresa Fahey Reitman | Exponent, Inc. | 2024 |
| Heike Riel | IBM Research, Zurich | 2022 |
| Robert O. Ritchie | University of California, Berkeley | 2001 |
| George A. Roberts (died 2013) | Teledyne, Inc. | 1978 |
| Lloyd M. Robeson | Air Products and Chemicals, Inc. | 2001 |
| John A. Rogers | Northwestern University - Evanston | 2011 |
| Frances Mary Ross | Massachusetts Institute of Technology | 2026 |
| Della M. Roy (died 2021) | The Pennsylvania State University - University Park | 1987 |
| Rustum Roy (died 2010) | Arizona State University | 1973 |
| Manfred Rühle | Max Planck Institute for Intelligent Systems | 1998 |
| Allen Stevenson Russell (died 2015) | Aluminum Company of America | 1976 |
| Anil K. Sachdev | General Motors Company | 2023 |
| Shinroku Saito (died 1994) | Kanagawa Academy of Science and Technology | 1994 |
| George A. Samara (died 2006) | Sandia National Laboratories | 1986 |
| Indira Vasanti Samarasekera | University of Alberta | 2014 |
| Isaac C. Sanchez | The University of Texas at Austin | 1997 |
| Harvey W. Schadler (died 2014) | GE Corporate Research and Development | 1991 |
| Jon Conrad Schaeffer | GE Power | 2017 |
| Robert E. Schafrik Sr (died 2018) | The University of Texas at Arlington | 2013 |
| George W. Scherer | Princeton University | 1997 |
| Darrell G. Schlom | Cornell University | 2017 |
| Julie M Schoenung | Texas A&M University-College Station | 2022 |
| Christopher A. Schuh | Northwestern University - Evanston | 2019 |
| Reinhardt Schuhmann Jr. (died 1996) | Purdue University | 1976 |
| Peter C. Schultz | Peter Schultz Consulting, LLC | 2001 |
| Lyle H. Schwartz | University of South Florida | 1994 |
| Ricardo B. Schwarz | Los Alamos National Laboratory | 2006 |
| David N. Seidman | Northwestern University - Evanston | 2018 |
| Sheldon Lee Semiatin | Air Force Research Laboratory | 2019 |
| Don W. Shaw | Texas Instruments Incorporated | 1988 |
| Eugene D. Shchukin | Johns Hopkins University | 1984 |
| Dan Shechtman | Technion-Israel Institute of Technology | 2000 |
| Oleg D. Sherby (died 2015) | Stanford University | 1979 |
| Paul G. Shewmon (died 2015) | The Ohio State University | 1979 |
| Richard P. Simmons (died 2026) | Allegheny Technologies Inc | 1998 |
| Raj N Singh | Oklahoma State University | 2024 |
| Subhash C. Singhal | Pacific Northwest National Laboratory | 2005 |
| Raymond E. Smallman (died 2015) | University of Birmingham | 2005 |
| Thor L. Smith (died 1999) | IBM Almaden Research Center | 1990 |
| Donald M. Smyth (died 2015) | Lehigh University | 1996 |
| Winston Oluwole Soboyejo | SUNY Polytechnic Institute | 2021 |
| Harold G. Sowman (died 2012) | Minnesota Mining & Manufacturing Company | 1984 |
| Frans Spaepen | Harvard University | 2008 |
| Nicola Spaldin | ETH Zurich | 2019 |
| John G. Speer | Colorado School of Mines | 2019 |
| David B. Spencer | wTe Corporation | 2014 |
| Rangaswamy Srinivasan | UVTech Associates | 1999 |
| David Joseph Srolovitz | The University of Hong Kong | 2015 |
| Roger W. Staehle (died 2017) | Staehle Consulting | 1978 |
| Vivian T. Stannett (died 2002) | North Carolina State University | 1995 |
| Edgar A. Starke Jr. | University of Virginia | 1998 |
| Dale F. Stein (died 2023) | Michigan Technological University | 1986 |
| Richard S. Stein (died 2021) | University of Massachusetts at Amherst | 1991 |
| Morris A. Steinberg (died 2016) | Lockheed Corporation | 1977 |
| Stanley Donald Stookey (died 2014) | Corning Incorporated | 1977 |
| Gerald B. Stringfellow (died 2025) | University of Utah | 2001 |
| Samuel I. Stupp | Northwestern University - Evanston | 2012 |
| Subra Suresh | Massachusetts Institute of Technology | 2002 |
| Julian Szekely (died 1995) | Massachusetts Institute of Technology | 1982 |
| Maria C. Tamargo | City College of New York | 2020 |
| Alan I. Taub | University of Michigan | 2006 |
| Kathleen C. Taylor | General Motors Corporation | 1995 |
| Michael Tenenbaum (died 2005) | Inland Steel Company | 1974 |
| Jerry Tersoff | IBM Thomas J. Watson Research Center | 2018 |
| Michael Makepeace Thackeray | Argonne National Laboratory | 2021 |
| Nickolas J. Themelis | Columbia University | 1983 |
| Cristina Urdaneta Thomas | 3M | 2024 |
| Edwin L. Thomas | Texas A&M University-College Station | 2009 |
| Gareth Thomas (died 2014) | University of California, Berkeley | 1982 |
| Donald O. Thompson (died 2013) | Iowa State University | 1991 |
| Mark Edward Thompson | University of Southern California | 2020 |
| R. Bruce Thompson (died 2011) | Iowa State University | 2003 |
| Charles W. Tobias (died 1996) | University of California, Berkeley | 1983 |
| Luisa Torsi | Università degli Studi di Bari Aldo Moro | 2026 |
| James Mitchell Tour | Rice University | 2024 |
| Elias Towe | Carnegie Mellon University | 2023 |
| Peter Trefonas | DuPont de Nemours Chemicals and Plastics | 2018 |
| Alexander R. Troiano (died 2002) | Case Western Reserve University | 1986 |
| Susan Elizabeth Trolier-McKinstry | The Pennsylvania State University | 2019 |
| Rudolf Maria Tromp | IBM Thomas J. Watson Research Center | 2020 |
| Rao R. Tummala | Georgia Institute of Technology | 1991 |
| Donald R. Uhlmann | University of Arizona | 1996 |
| Richard A. Vaia | Air Force Research Laboratory | 2020 |
| Chris G. Van de Walle | University of California, Santa Barbara | 2016 |
| Le Grand Van Uitert (died 1999) | AT&T Bell Laboratories | 1981 |
| Anil V. Virkar | University of Utah | 2007 |
| Vaclav Vitek | University of Pennsylvania | 2006 |
| John B. Wachtman Jr. (died 2022) | Rutgers, The State University of New Jersey, New Brunswick | 1976 |
| Jeffrey Wadsworth | Battelle | 2005 |
| Milton E. Wadsworth (died 2013) | University of Utah | 1979 |
| Robert H. Wagoner (died 2025) | The Ohio State University | 1995 |
| Kenneth L. Walker | BrightView Technologies | 2002 |
| Christine A. Wang | MIT Lincoln Laboratory | 2019 |
| Johannes Weertman (died 2018) | Northwestern University - Evanston | 1976 |
| Julia R. Weertman (died 2018) | Northwestern University - Evanston | 1988 |
| Sheldon Weinig (died 2026) | Columbia University | 1984 |
| David A. Weitz | Harvard University | 2016 |
| Robert H. Wentorf Jr. (died 1997) | Rensselaer Polytechnic Institute | 1979 |
| Jack H. Wernick (died 2006) | Telcordia Technologies, Inc. | 1979 |
| Jack H. Westbrook | Brookline Technologies | 1997 |
| Albert R. C. Westwood (died 2023) | Sandia National Laboratories | 1980 |
| Robert M. White | Carnegie Mellon University | 1989 |
| George M. Whitesides | Harvard University | 2005 |
| M. Stanley Whittingham | Binghamton University | 2018 |
| Sheldon M. Wiederhorn (died 2021) | National Institute of Standards and Technology | 1991 |
| James C. Williams | The Ohio State University | 1987 |
| C. Grant Willson | The University of Texas at Austin | 1992 |
| Karen Irene Winey | University of Pennsylvania | 2026 |
| Ching-Ping Wong | Georgia Institute of Technology | 2000 |
| Karen Lynn Wooley | Texas A&M University-College Station | 2026 |
| Daniel Christopher Worledge | International Business Machines Corporation | 2024 |
| Kuangdi Xu | Chinese Academy of Engineering | 2006 |
| Gregory J. Yurek | American Superconductor Corporation | 2011 |
| James A. Yurko | Apple Inc. | 2022 |
| Matthew J. Zaluzec | University of Florida | 2021 |
| Qiming Zhang | The Pennsylvania State University - University Park | 2026 |
| Ji-Cheng Zhao | University of Connecticut | 2023 |
| Steven J. Zinkle | The University of Tennessee, Knoxville | 2012 |
