= Jona Island =

Island in Graham Land, Antarctica

- Location within Antarctica

Geography
- Location: Antarctica
- Coordinates: 66°55′S 67°42′W

Administration
- Administered under the Antarctic Treaty System

Demographics
- Population: Uninhabited

Jona Island is an island off the western coast of Graham Land on the Antarctic Peninsula. It is one of the smaller of the Bennett Islands, lying in Hanusse Bay 6 kilometres (3 nmi) north of the eastern end of Weertman Island and near Adelaide Island. It is within the Argentine, British and Chilean Antarctic claims.

The island was mapped from air photos taken by the Ronne Antarctic Research Expedition (1947–48) and the Falkland Islands and Dependencies Aerial Survey Expedition (1956–57). It was named by the UK Antarctic Place-Names Committee for Franco P. Jona, an American (formerly Italian) physicist who in 1951 made an accurate determination of the elastic constant of a single ice crystal.

== See also ==
- List of Antarctic and sub-Antarctic islands
