= Mügge Island =

Island in Graham Land, Antarctica

- Location within Antarctica

Geography
- Location: Antarctica
- Coordinates: 66°55′S 67°45′W

Administration
- Administered under the Antarctic Treaty System

Demographics
- Population: Uninhabited

Mügge Island is one of the Bennett Islands, lying 2.8 kilometres (1.5 nmi) north of the west end of Weertman Island in Hanusse Bay. Mapped from air photos taken by Ronne Antarctic Research Expedition (RARE) (1947–48) and Falkland Islands and Dependencies Aerial Survey Expedition (FIDASE) (1956–57). It was named by the United Kingdom Antarctic Place-Names Committee (UK-APC) for Johannes O.C. Mügge (1858-1932), a German mineralogist who made pioneer studies of the plasticity of ice, in 1895.

== See also ==
- List of Antarctic and sub-Antarctic islands
