= Kenneth Jackson =

Kenneth Jackson may refer to:

- Kenneth H. Jackson (1909–1991), linguist specializing in the Brythonic languages
- Kenneth T. Jackson (born 1939), historian specializing in New York City
- Kenny Jackson (born 1962), former professional American football player
- Kenny Jackson (cricketer) (born 1964), former first class cricketer
- Ken Jackson (trade unionist) (1937–2024), British trades unionist
- Ken Jackson (gridiron football) (1929–1998), American football player
- Ken Jackson (rugby league), rugby league footballer of the 1950s and 1960s for Great Britain, and Oldham
- Kenneth A. Jackson (born 1957), businessman in Baltimore, Maryland, with past connections to the illegal drug trade
- Ken Jackson (baseball) (born 1963), former Major League Baseball player
- Kenneth Jackson (sportsman) (1913–1982), Scottish cricketer and rugby union player
