= Otto Mügge =

German mineralogist and crystallographer

Johannes Otto Conrad Mügge (4 March 1858, Hannover – 9 June 1932, Göttingen) was a German mineralogist and crystallographer.

From 1875 to 1879 he studied mathematics and sciences at the Technical University of Hannover and at the University of Göttingen. After graduation, he spent three years as an assistant to Harry Rosenbusch at the mineralogical-geological institute of the University of Heidelberg. From 1882 he worked as curator of the mineralogical and geological department at the Natural History Museum in Hamburg, and in 1886 became an associate professor at the academy in Münster. Later on, he served as a full professor at the University of Königsberg, where in 1903/04 he was named dean to the faculty of philosophy. In 1908 he relocated as a professor to the University of Göttingen.

Mügge Island, one of the Bennett Islands off the coast of Antarctica, commemorates his name.

== Published works ==
He was the author of 152 scientific works; dealing with subjects such as, the translation of crystals by mechanical deformation, the regular adhesion of different types of minerals, the formation temperature of quartz and plagioclase twinning, the correlation of pleochroic haloes with radioactive radiation and the petrography of selected rock complexes in Westphalia, Hesse and the Harz. With Ernst Anton Wülfing, he published the fifth edition of Harry Rosenbusch's Mikroskopische Physiographie der Mineralien und Gesteine (1921–27). Other noted works by Mügge include:

- Krystallographische Untersuchung einiger organischen Verbindungen, 1879 – Crystallographic study of some organic compounds.
- Untersuchungen über die "Lenneporphyre" in Westfalen und den angrenzenden Gebieten, 1893 – Studies on the "Lenne porphyries" in Westphalia and adjacent areas.
- Über Translationen und verwandte Erscheinungen in Kristallen, Neues Jb. Miner. Geol. u. Palaont., J_, 71–159, 1898 – On translation and related phenomena in crystals.
- Ueber die Structur des grönländischen Inlandeises und ihre Bedeutung für die Theorie der Gletscherbewegung, 1899 – Concerning the structure of the Greenland ice sheet and its importance for the theory of glacier movement.
- Über regelmässige Verwachsungen von Bleiglanz mit Eisenkies und Kupferkies mit Kobaltglanz, Min. Petr. Mitt., Wien, 20, 1901, (349- 354) – On regular adhesions of galena with iron pyrites and chalcopyrite with cobaltite.
- Krystallographie, 1905 (with Theodor Liebisch and Arthur Moritz Schoenflies).
