= Stéphane Mangin =

French physicist (born 1971)

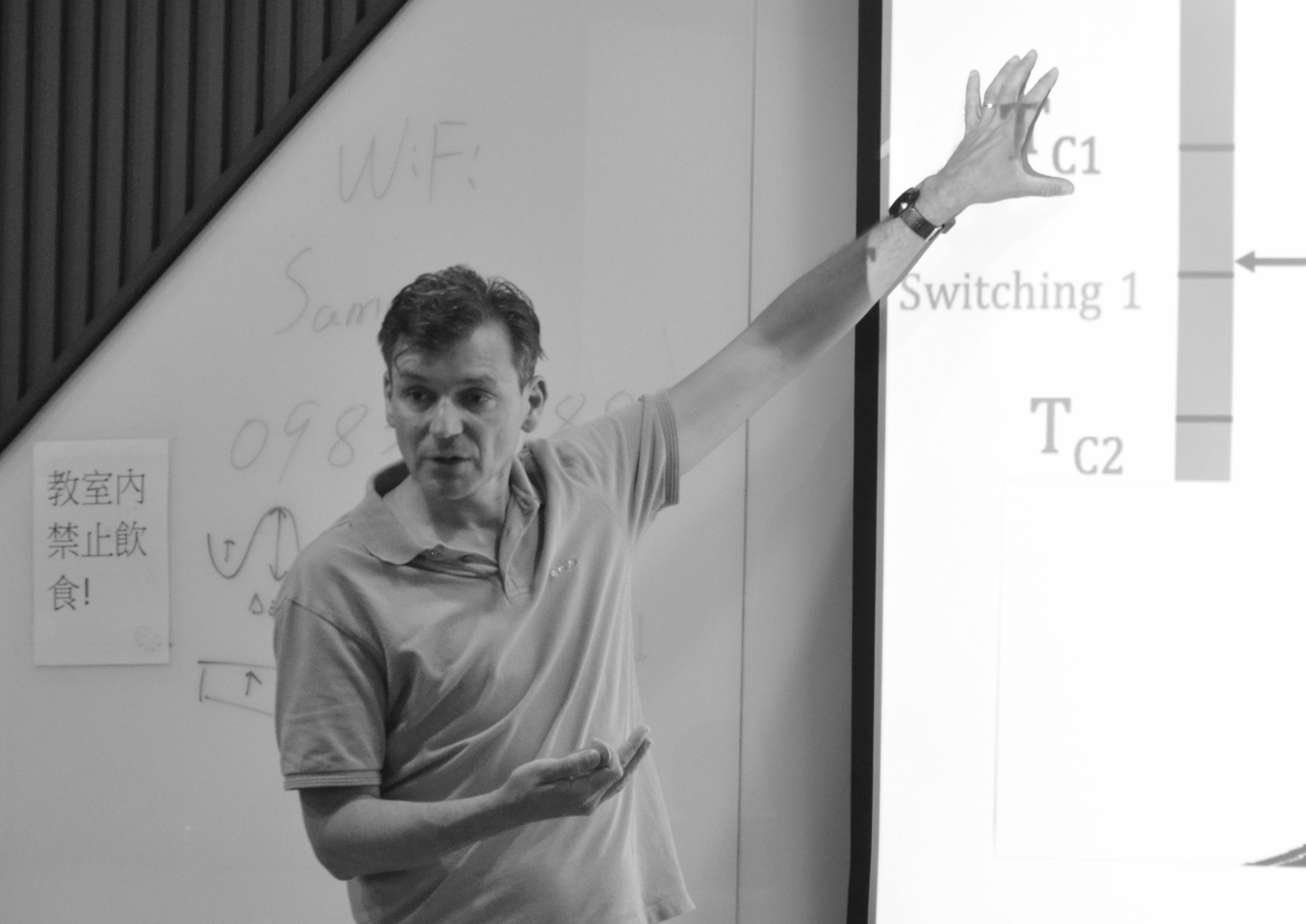
- Born: 17 September 1971 (age 54)
- Education: Joseph Fourier University
- Occupations: Physicist, professor
- Employer(s): University of Louvain, Henri Poincaré University, IBM Almaden Research Center, University of California, San Diego, Nancy School of Mines, University of Lorraine, University of Cambridge
- Organization(s): Institut universitaire de France, Parliamentary Office for the Evaluation of Scientific and Technological Choices (France), American Physical Society, IEEE Magnetics Society, Churchill College, Cambridge, European Academy of Sciences
- Known for: Spintronics, Nanomagnetism, Nanoelectronics, Nanomaterials
- Awards: Chevalier de l'Ordre national du mérite (2025)

Stéphane Mangin is a physicist and professor at the University of Lorraine in Nancy, France. He is head of the Nanomagnetism and Spintronics group at the Institut Jean Lamour, a laboratory jointly run by the CNRS and the University of Lorraine.

His research concerns the study of nanomagnets and their magnetization dynamics under the influence of different stimuli such as a magnetic field, a current pulse which can generate a spin-transfer torque, a spin-orbit torque (see spin-orbit interaction), or an ultrashort pulse laser.

His work has had technological applications to magnetoresistive random-access memory (MRAM) and magnetic data storage on hard disk drives, for example heat-assisted magnetic recording (HAMR) using a laser beam.

== Biography ==
Stéphane Mangin obtained his PhD thesis in 1997 at the Université Joseph Fourier in Grenoble, France, later becoming a post-doctoral researcher at the Université catholique de Louvain in Belgium. He was an assistant professor at the Henri Poincaré University in Nancy, before promotion to a full professorship in 2008.

He has worked in collaboration with many laboratories all over the world. In 2004–2005, he was an invited researcher at Hitachi GST San Jose Research center California and in 2012–2013, an invited professor at the Center for Magnetic Recording Research in the University of California, San Diego (UCSD). In 2015, he co-founded an International Laboratory on NanoElectronics with Eric Fullerton at UCSD, Dafiné Ravélosona at Paris-Sud University and Andrew Kent at New York University. In 2021-2022, he had been a visiting fellow and professor at Churchill College, University of Cambridge.

Since 2009, he has been the scientific director of project Tube Daνm (Deposit and Analysis of Nanomaterials under Ultra-High Vacuum), a 70-meter-long technological platform, the only such device in the world. This tube allows researchers and companies to work under ultra-high vacuum conditions in order to grow thin film material with new properties, allowing for example future data storage possibilities.

He has organized or co-organized several international conferences and workshops, including the Magnetic Single Nano-Object Workshop and School and the World Materials Forum.

Mangin had actively engaged in interactions between science and the general public, including popularization and mainstream conferences. Between 2013 and 2019, he served on the committee of the "Parliamentary Office for the Evaluation of Scientific and Technological Choices", a French governmental advisory group.

== Honors and awards ==
- 2007: Junior member of the Institut Universitaire de France
- 2008: First research prize from the Lorraine region
- 2010: President of the local section of Société française de Physique
- 2015: Member of the local section of the French Academy of Sciences
- 2017: Senior member of the Institut Universitaire de France
- 2018: Fellow of the American Physical Society
- 2019: President of IEEE Magnetics Society France Chapter
- 2021: IEEE Fellow of the Magnetic Society
- 2022: Visiting Fellow of Churchill College, Cambridge
- 2025: Member of European Academy of Sciences
- 2025: Chevalier de l'Ordre national du Mérite (nominated the 15 may 2025)
