= Nathan Barksdale =

American drug dealer

- Born: 1961; Baltimore, Maryland, U.S.
- Died: February 13, 2016 (aged 54–55); Butner, North Carolina, U.S.
- Other name: Nathan "Bodie" Barksdale
- Occupations: Drug dealer, Counselor (Safe Streets program)
- Convictions: Battery (1985), Drug-related conviction (2014)
- Criminal charges: Battery, Federal charge of being a felon with a gun (acquitted), Drug trafficking
- Penalty: 15 years in state prison (Battery), Nearly four years in federal prison (Drug conviction)

Nathan "Bodie" Barksdale (1961 – February 13, 2016) was a Baltimore, Maryland, stick up kid dramatized in the HBO series The Wire, although the extent to which any of the show's characters or plot lines are based on his life is disputed. His life is the subject of the unreleased docudrama Baltimore Chronicles: Legends of the Unwired, which purports to be the true story behind The Wire. He was in the early stages of writing his autobiography at the time of his death.

== Early life ==
Barksdale was raised in the Lexington Terrace projects in Baltimore. He was involved in boxing, as were other family members. When he was young, a man ran over Barksdale's leg with his truck after Barksdale stole from him. As a result, Barksdale underwent an amputation and subsequently became addicted to opiates.

== Criminal career ==
Barksdale was a drug dealer in West Baltimore who purportedly survived 21 gunshots, some of which were fired while Barksdale was in the hospital after a prior, failed murder attempt. In 1985, Barksdale was sentenced to 15 years in state prison for battery. In 2003, he was acquitted of a federal charge of being a felon with a gun.

Barksdale's name appeared in the Baltimore Sun's 1987 series Easy Money: Anatomy of a Drug Empire, written by David Simon, who went on to be the creator, executive producer, and head writer of The Wire. In the newspaper series, which focuses on the criminal career of Melvin Williams, Simon depicts Barksdale as a ruthless killer. Simon also writes that Barksdale once tortured three people in the Baltimore projects and that his battery conviction was related to the torture incident.

== Legends of the Unwired ==
Baltimore Chronicles: Legends of the Unwired is an unreleased, low-budget docudrama based on Barksdale's life. It is directed by Bruce Brown, and Drew Berry is the writer and producer. Kenneth A. Jackson is the executive producer, and singer Troy May of the Manhattans is the narrator. Legends of the Unwired consists of dramatizations of alleged events in Barksdale's criminal career, interviews with his family and friends, and interviews of Barksdale by actor Wood Harris, who plays drug kingpin Avon Barksdale on The Wire.

== Disputed connection to The Wire ==
Simon denies that Nathan Barksdale or any other individual is the basis for any specific character in The Wire. A major point of contention is Barksdale's claim that his middle name is Avon. According to Simon, this name was not associated with Barksdale in any official document, and Barksdale has failed to produce any documentary evidence of having any middle name.

However, in his director's commentary to the first episode of The Wire, Simon says: "We tend to mix the names up … but it’s our kind of back-handed homage to the reality of West Baltimore. There really was a Nathan Bodie Barksdale. We split that up. There’s a Bodie character in this tale, there’s an Avon Barksdale character. The Barksdale family was famous in their day in West Baltimore back in the '80s for their endeavors in the projects. That’s how we’re playing it. They’re not based on real people, individually, but a character might be a composite..."

Some connections between The Wire and Simon's reporting on Barksdale, however, are evident. In addition to the name and the boxing background, for example, in Easy Money, Simon claims that Marlow Bates and Timmirror Stanfield were rivals of Barksdale's. In The Wire, Marlo Stanfield becomes a major rival of Avon Barksdale's who eventually takes over the Baltimore drug trade. However, Nathan Barksdale claimed that Bates was a close friend of his.

== Later years and death ==
In his later years, Barksdale worked for the city Health Department in Baltimore, in the Safe Streets program and counseled young people to help them avoid his mistakes. However, during that time, the Baltimore Sun reports: "Barksdale said he had lapsed back into heroin addiction and had been running a scam to feed his habit. He said he would try to get samples of heroin, promising to pass them on to big-time dealers, but would use the drugs himself."

In 2014, Barksdale was "ensnared in a Drug Enforcement Administration wiretap investigation", and after pleading guilty was convicted and sentenced to nearly four years in federal prison. He served time at a Federal Correctional Complex in North Carolina. In February 2016, he died from an undisclosed illness at a medical prison in Butner, North Carolina, aged 54.
