= Institute for Energy Efficiency =

Research institute at University of California, Santa Barbara

The Institute for Energy Efficiency (IEE) is a research institute of the University of California, Santa Barbara (UCSB). IEE is an interdisciplinary research institute dedicated to the development of science and technologies that increase energy efficiency, reduce energy consumption, and support an efficient and sustainable energy future.

The institute was founded in 2008 with the proposition to establish a new, cross-disciplinary institute that would integrate the many diverse research projects in energy efficiency and provide a focus for work in this area. Four years later, in 2012, IEE cofounder and then-Oracle Corporation chairman Jeff Henley, calling UC Santa Barbara the “best-kept secret in the world,” donated $50M to IEE and its parent College of Engineering to boost research and market solutions in clean energy and energy efficiency.

In 2020 the Institute moved into a new, purpose-built building, named Henley Hall. In 2025 founding Director John E. Bowers retired and under its new Director Steven P. DenBaars the Institute pulled in the Solid State Lighting and Energy Electronics Center (SSLEEC), expanding its size and scope.

== Research ==
Research at IEE falls into three programs, all of which address broad and complex energy efficiency-related grand challenges:

- Smart societal infrastructure. Research is aimed at exploring ways to update the existing power grid, integrate renewable energy sources, and reduce and manage power consumption in buildings, homes and other systems that attach to the grid.
- Computing and communications. Research anticipates the growing consumption of energy by data centers and computational facilities, and seeks to find ways to reduce the energy used to move data within and between data centers, as society moves toward a growing Internet of Things.
- Food, energy and water. Research focuses on finding ways to reduce power consumption and wasted water in the production of food for an exponentially growing global population.

To meet these challenges, IEE faculty and researchers align their work along three technical foundations:

- Electronics and photonics materials. Recognizing that light is the fastest, lowest-cost and highest-capacity method of transmitting data and thus has become vital to many emerging and future technologies, IEE research explores optics and photonics to replace electronic transmission of information. The research also aims at increasing the efficiency of energy conversion.
- AI and machine learning. Energy efficiency research in this area concentrates on decreasing the amount of energy used to process the vast amounts of data in artificial intelligence applications through both hardware and algorithmic improvements.
- Policy and sustainability. Research in this area explores topics such as environmental impact, sustainability and life cycle assessment to understand the long-term social and environmental effects of the production of chemicals and other materials.

== Programs ==
IEE administers several programs to support research, implement research and engage with industry partners. A major program is being the West Coast Hub for the American Institute of Manufacturing Photonics (AIM Photonics), which is one of 16 manufacturing innovation institutes within the Manufacturing USA network. Other programs in IEE include the Industry Partner program, seed funding and fellowship programs, Apprentice Researchers program, previous contributions to University of California's Carbon Neutrality Initiative and a program to distribute energy efficient solar power lighting through a nonprofit called Unite to Light. At the institute's Emerging Technologies Review event, speakers from across the industry and academia come together to discuss better efforts to battle carbon emissions.

== Education and outreach ==
IEE hosts weekly public seminars and energy leadership lectures, as well as an emerging technology review and regular technology roundtable discussions for stakeholders from industry, government and academia. Its Apprentice Researchers Program gives high school students the opportunity to conduct scientific investigations present their findings.

== Leadership ==
The institute is led by founding emeritus Director John E. Bowers, Director Steven P. DenBaars, Executive Director Mark Abel and Assistant Director Jenna Craig.

Guidance also comes from the Director's Council, headed by Oracle vice-chairman Jeff Henley. The Director's Council also includes Mark Bertelsen, partner Wilson Sansini; Dan Burnham, former Raytheon CEO; Jim Dehlsen, CEO of Ecomerit; Reece Duca, founder, GlobalEnglish; Bob Duggan, former CEO of Pharmacyclics; Glenn Duvall, CEO of Challenger Cable; Wenbin Jiang, CEO of Cytek Biosciences; John MacFarlane, former SONOS CEO; John Marren, Technology Chief, TPG; and Fredric Steck, partner Goldman Sachs.

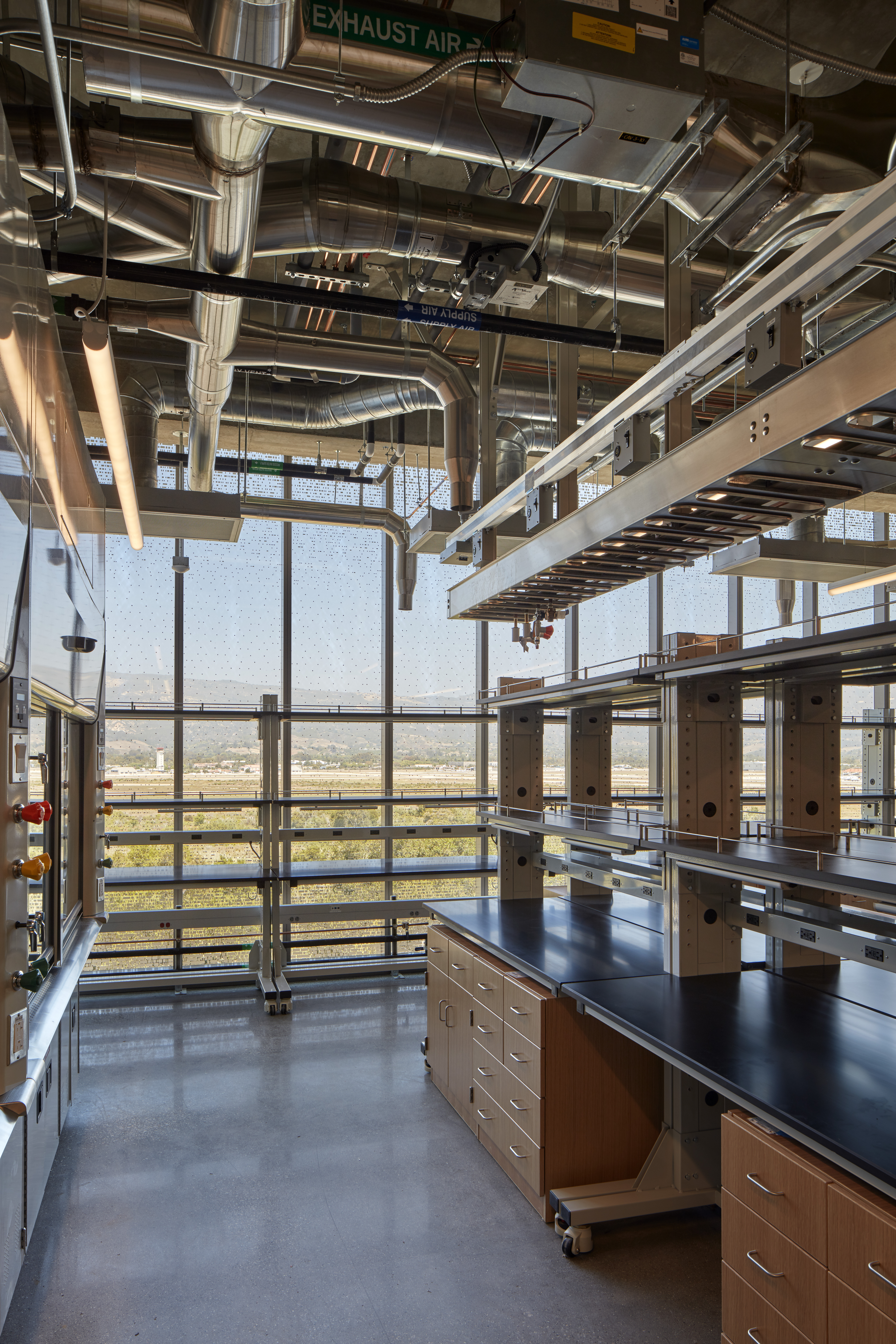

== Researchers ==
Approximately 40 UCSB faculty from disciplines including electrical and computer engineering, computer science, environmental science and management, chemistry, biochemistry and materials conduct research within the institute. Roughly 14 graduate student researchers and six postdoctoral researchers are currently affiliated with the institute.

Notable faculty include 2000 Chemistry Nobel laureate Alan Heeger, 2014 Physics Nobel laureate Shuji Nakamura and 2016 National Medal of Technology and Innovation medalist Arthur Gossard. IEE faculty members hold awards and honors from organizations including the National Academies of Engineering, Inventors, and Sciences; the American Association for the Advancement of Science (AAAS); the Institute of Electrical and Electronics Engineers (IEEE); The Optical Society (OSA); the American Physical Society (APS); and the Association for Computing Machinery (ACM).

== History ==
Aware of the need to create and promote energy efficient technologies and noticing a convergence of many energy-efficiency related research projects across the UCSB campus, College of Engineering Dean Matt Tirrell and UCSB Chancellor Henry T. Yang, together with a group of business leaders including Jeff Henley, Dan Burnham, Fred Steck, and John Marin in 2008 proposed the establishment of the Institute for Energy Efficiency. Professor John Bowers of the Department of Electrical and Computer Engineering and of the Department of Materials, was selected as the founding director.

For the first 10 years, the institute was organized into six Solution Groups, led by UCSB faculty members prominent in their fields:

Solution Group	Leader
Lighting	Steven DenBaars
Energy Production & Storage	Guillermo Bazan
Electronics & Photonics	John Bowers
Buildings & Design	Igor Mezic
Computing	Rich Wolski
Economics & Policy	Sangwon Suh

In 2019, IEE organized its research into three main thrusts:

- Smart Societal Infrastructure
- Computing and Communications
- Food, Energy and Water

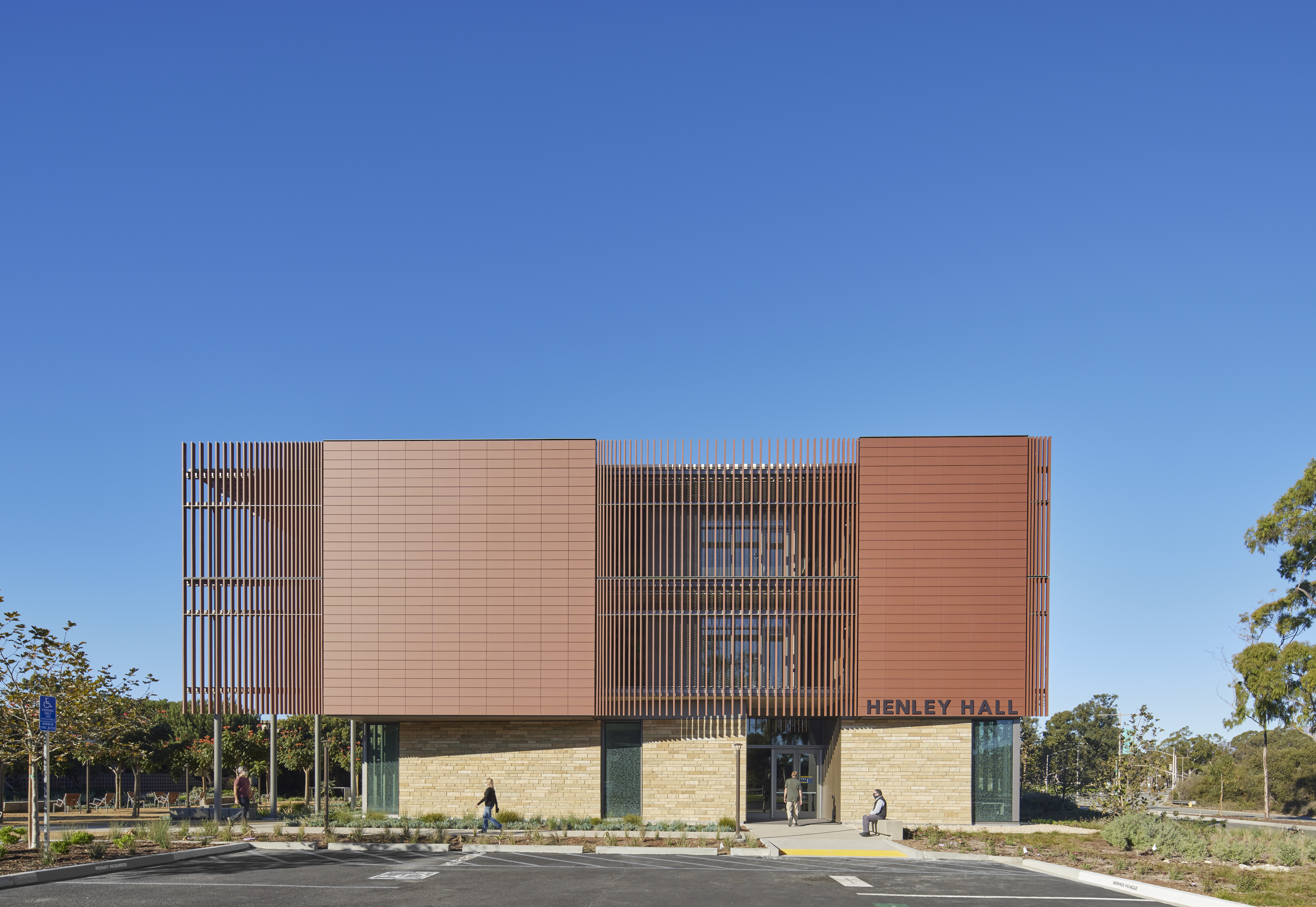

== Henley Hall ==
The Institute for Energy Efficiency is housed in Henley Hall, a three-story 49,900 gross square foot building designed to house IEE's research activity and programs. The building consists of wet- and dry laboratories, conference and collaboration spaces, a 124-seat lecture hall and faculty and administrative offices. Co-locating IEE faculty and students into one building is expected to foster collaborations and expedite the commercialization of new technologies. As of November 2021, Henley Hall has been awarded the U.S. Green Building Council's 2021 Leadership in Energy and Environmental Design (LEED) Platinum certification. LEED Platinum is the top level of LEED certification recognizing Henley Hall's exceptional environmentally friendly and sustainable design.
