= Larbalestier =

Larbalestier (from Old French meaning "the arbalist" or "the arbalister") is an English surname from Devon, where the family held a seat as Lords of the Manor. Notable people with the surname include:

- David Larbalestier, American physicist
- Justine Larbalestier (born 1967), Australian writer
- Simon Larbalestier (born 1962), Welsh photographer
- Sir Lewis Hamilton (born 1985), British F1 racing driver and world champion, changed his name in 2022 to incorporate his mother's surname, including 'Larbalestier' as a middle name rather than adding it to his surname.
