= J. Reid Shelton =

Professor

Dr. J. Reid Shelton (January 16, 1911 – December 31, 2007) was a professor of chemistry at Case Western University in Cleveland, Ohio. He is known for his work on oxidation and antioxidants in rubber, and for his application of laser-Raman spectroscopy to the study of sulfur vulcanization. His research on synthetic rubber was particularly important during World War II, when access to natural rubber in Southeast Asia was cut off by the Japanese, and the new SR made from styrene and butadiene displayed stability problems.

With his students, he undertook fundamental studies of the reactions occurring in the oxidation, degradation, and stabilization of rubber and other polymers with support at various times from Firestone, Goodyear, the U.S. Army Ordnance Research and other government agencies, and the Petroleum Research Fund.

In 1983, Shelton received the ACS Rubber Division's Charles Goodyear Medal. Shelton mentored another Charles Goodyear Medalist: Jack L. Koenig. Koenig won the award in 2000.

Shelton retired in 1977 after 41 years of teaching.

He died December 31, 2007 at the age of 96.
