= James Stark Koehler =

American physicist (1914–2006)

James Stark Koehler (10 November 1914 in Oshkosh, Wisconsin – 19 June 2006 in Urbana, Illinois) was an American physicist, specializing in metal defects and their interactions. He is known for the eponymous Peach-Koehler stress formula.

== Career ==
Koehler received 1935 his bachelor's degree from Oshkosh State Teachers College (now called the University of Wisconsin, Oshkosh). In 1940 he received from the University of Michigan his Ph.D. under David M. Dennison with a thesis Hindered rotation in methyl-alcohol. After a postdoc fellowship in 1940–1941, supervised by Frederick Seitz, at the University of Pennsylvania, and another fellowship for about six months in 1941–1942 at the Westinghouse Electric Company in Pittsburgh, he became a physics instructor at Carnegie Tech in early 1942.

His original focus was on plastic waves in metals upon impact. By 1944 Koehler joined the Manhattan Engineer District, to study the effects produced in solids by irradiation. One of his many contributions was the measurement of the self-diffusion activation energy of uranium, which was used to calculate the change in the shape of the cylindrical uranium slugs in the Hanford plutonium-producing reactors. After the war, the new Office of Naval Research in 1947 began to support his work on plastic deformation. In 1949, Koehler was invited to join the new Illinois department program in condensed matter physics. Koehler moved his Navy equipment to Urbana, and ONR support continued through 1970. Upon his arrival, substantial support from the Atomic Energy Commission began for a program in radiation damage, which used the Illinois cyclotron. Later his dream was realized to have a dedicated facility for “simple” radiation damage (2 MeV electrons) in the new Illinois Materials Research Laboratory.

Koehler supervised 7 doctoral dissertations at Carnegie Tech (now called Carnegie Mellon University) and 38 doctoral dissertations at the University of Illinois Urbana-Champaign, where he was a faculty member from 1949 until his retirement as professor emeritus in 1981. He was elected in 1949 as a Fellow of the American Physical Society. For the academic year 1956–1957, he was a Guggenheim Fellow at the Cavendish Laboratory.

His name is easily attached to some fundamental properties of defects in crystals. The Peach-Koehler formula gives the basic relation now widely used for the force on a dislocation in terms of an applied stress and the Vibrating String Model is the first formulation of the equation of motion underlying dislocation dynamics. Almost nobody believed Koehler’s 1952 prediction of L^{2} and L^{4} loop segment length dependence of the elastic modulus and internal friction, respectively, until 1956 measurements by Thompson and Holmes of Oak Ridge National Laboratory showed it to be correct. Thereafter, this signature became the standard for identifying dislocation losses, and one of the most sensitive detectors of interstitials available.

Koehler is also known for the Cooper-Koehler-Marx experiment, the Magnuson-Palmer-Koehler experiment, and the Bauerle-Koehler experiment.

== Students ==
Several of Koehler's doctoral students were elected Fellows of the American Physical Society:

Name	Year of PhD	Year of election to APS
Thomas H. Blewitt	1950 (Carnegie Tech)	1971
Edward I. Salkowitz	1950 (Carnegie Tech)	1963
Johannes Weertman	1951 (Carnegie Tech)	1975
Abraham Sosin	1954 (UIUC)	1969
Ralph O. Simmons	1957 (UIUC)	1961
Kenneth L. Kliewer	1964 (UIUC)	1981
