= Steven P. DenBaars =

American material scientist and electrical engineer

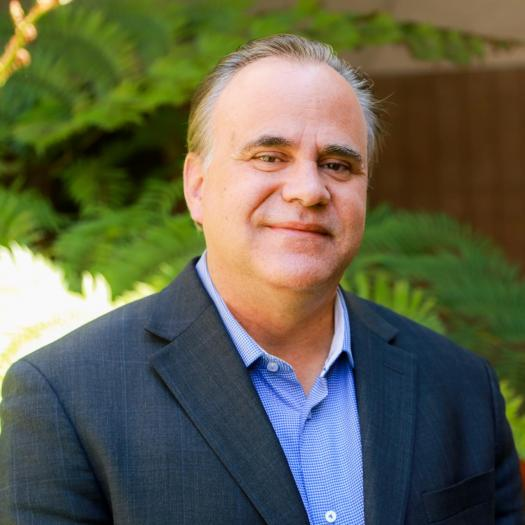
- Education: University of Arizona; University of Southern California
- Known for: Nitride Semiconductors; MOCVD; Light-emitting diode Laser Diode
- Scientific career
- Fields: Materials, Electrical Engineering & Nitrides
- Workplaces: University of California, Santa Barbara

Steven P. DenBaars is an American material scientist, electrical engineer, and academic. He is a professor of Materials and Electrical and Computer Engineering, and the executive director of the Solid State Lighting and Energy Electronics Center at the University of California, Santa Barbara, and as of 2025, the Director for the Institute for Energy Efficiency at the University of California, Santa Barbara. He is also a Fellow of National Academy of Inventors (NAI), and was selected as a Member of National Academy of Engineering (NAE) in 2012 for contributions to gallium nitride-based materials and devices for solid state lighting and displays.

== Education ==
DenBaars received his bachelor's degree in Materials and Metallurgical Engineering from University of Arizona in 1984. He was selected as the outstanding senior in metallurgical engineering, and valedictorian of his class. He then enrolled at University of Southern California, and earned his master's degree in materials science, and a Doctoral degree in Electrical Engineering in 1986 and 1988, respectively.

== Career ==
DenBaars started his academic career as a research assistant at the University of Southern California Compound Semiconductor Laboratory in 1984. Following this, he held appointment as an assistant professor in Materials Department in 1991, and was promoted to associate professor in 1994, and became a professor at the University of California, Santa Barbara in 1998.

DenBaars also held administrative appointments in his career. He served as an executive director at Solid State Lighting and Display Center from 2002 till 2007, and at Solid State Lighting and Energy Center from 2007 till 2014. He currently serves as an executive director of Solid State Lighting and Energy Electronics Center.

DenBaars also has professional experience in his field. He was a member of the technical staff at Hewlett Packard's Optoelectronics Division from 1988 to 1991, where he developed high brightness visible LEDs. He has served on the editorial board of MRS Internet Journal of Nitride Research, Compound Semiconductor Magazine, and as an editor for Materials Research Society Conference Proceedings since 2010. From 2013 until 2020, he was the chairman and co-founder of Soraa Laser Diode Inc. He has served as a Scientific Advisor for CREE Inc., as a Consultant for Seoul Semiconductor, and is currently the Endowed Mitsubishi Chemical Chair in Solid State Lighting and Display, and on the advisory board of Crystals, and on the board of directors for Akoustis Inc.

== Research ==
DenBaars has published over 800 papers, has been cited over 84,000 times, and has a Google Scholar H-index of 143. His research primarily focuses on MOCVD growth of wide-bandgap semiconductors (GaN-based) and their application to blue and UV LEDs and laser diodes as well as RF and high-power electronic devices. This research has led to the first U.S. University demonstration of a blue GaN laser diode, first RF Power measurements from GaN HEMTs, and highest efficiency Micro-LEDs.

In early studies, DenBaars focused on the formation process of quantum‐sized dots from uniform coherent islands of InGaAs on GaAs surfaces, and highlighted the photoluminescence at ~1.2 eV from these islands by conducting a comparison between samples with and without dots. In 2009, he explored the prospects for LED lighting. He also discussed the role of roughened surfaces of light-emitting diodes (LEDs) in terms of improving light extraction efficiency. Furthermore, he along with co-authors presented a report on temperature-dependent time-integrated and time-resolved photoluminescence (PL) studies regarding InGaN/GaN multiple quantum wells (MQWs).

DenBaars conducted a study in 2000 focusing the two-dimensional electron gas (2DEG) in AlGaN/GaN heterostructure field effect transistors, and also described the role of the polarization-induced dipole. He studied threading dislocation structure and explored its impact on the x‐ray diffraction peak widths in epitaxial GaN films. Moreover, he based his research on the energy gap, absorption coefficient, exciton binding energy, and recombination lifetime of GaN obtained from transmission measurements.

== Awards and honors ==
- 1994 – NSF Young Investigator Award
- 1998 – Young Scientist Award, Int Compound Semiconductors Symposium ‘98
- 2007 – USC Distinguished Alumni Award, University of Southern California
- 2008 – Fellow, Institute of Electrical and Electronics Engineers (IEEE)
- 2010 – Aron Kressel Award, IEEE Photonics Society
- 2012 – Member, National Academy of Engineering
- 2013 – Fellow, National Academy of Inventors
- 2021 – Central Coast Innovation Award, Pacific Coast Business Times (joint w/ Shuji Nakamura)
- 2021 – Quantum Device Award, Intl Compound Semiconductor Symposium
- Mitsubishi Distinguished Professor, UC Santa Barbara Materials
- 2026 – IEEE Nick Holonyak, Jr. Medal for Semiconductor Optoelectronic Technologies

== Selected publications ==
- Leonard, D., Krishnamurthy, M., Reaves, C., DenBaars, S. P., & Petroff, P. M. (1993). Direct formation of quantum‐sized dots from uniform coherent islands of InGaAs on GaAs surfaces. Applied Physics Letters, 63(23), 3203–3205.
- Heying, B., Wu, X. H., Keller, S., Li, Y., Kapolnek, D., Keller, B. P., ... & Speck, J. S. (1996). Role of threading dislocation structure on the x‐ray diffraction peak widths in epitaxial GaN films. Applied physics letters, 68(5), 643–645.
- Wu, Y. F., Keller, B. P., Keller, S., Kapolnek, D., Denbaars, S. P., & Mishra, U. K. (1996). Measured microwave power performance of AlGaN/GaN MODFET. IEEE Electron Device Letters, 17(9), 455–457.
- Ibbetson, J. P., Fini, P. T., Ness, K. D., DenBaars, S. P., Speck, J. S., & Mishra, U. K. (2000). Polarization effects, surface states, and the source of electrons in AlGaN/GaN heterostructure field effect transistors. Applied Physics Letters, 77(2), 250–252.
- Fujii, T., Gao, Y., Sharma, R., Hu, E. L., DenBaars, S. P., & Nakamura, S. (2004). Increase in the extraction efficiency of GaN-based light-emitting diodes via surface roughening. Applied physics letters, 84(6), 855–857.
- Pimputkar, S., Speck, J. S., DenBaars, S. P., & Nakamura, S. (2009). Prospects for LED lighting. Nature photonics, 3(4), 180–182.
- Wong, M. S., Oh, S. H., Back, J., Lee, C., Speck, J. S., Nakamura, S., & DenBaars, S. P. (2021). Enhanced external quantum efficiency of III-nitride micro-light-emitting diodes using vertical and transparent package. Japanese Journal of Applied Physics, 60(2), 020905.
