= Julia Weertman =

American materials scientist (1926–2018)

- Born: Julia Randall; February 10, 1926; Mount Lebanon, Pennsylvania, U.S.
- Died: July 31, 2018 (aged 92); Evanston, Illinois, U.S.
- Education: Carnegie Institute of Technology (BS, MS, DSc)
- Known for: Nanocrystalline materials, Dislocation theory, High-temperature alloys
- Title: Walter P. Murphy Professor
- Spouse: Johannes Weertman (m. 1950)
- Awards: National Academy of Engineering (1988); Guggenheim Fellowship (1986); John Fritz Medal (2014); ASM International Gold Medal (2005)
- Scientific career
- Fields: Materials science, Metallurgy
- Workplaces: Northwestern University

Julia Randall Weertman (February 10, 1926 – July 31, 2018) was an American materials scientist who taught at Northwestern University as the Walter P. Murphy Professor of Materials Science and Engineering.

== Education ==
She was the first female student of the College of Science and Engineering at the Carnegie Institute of Technology, where she earned her baccalaureate and graduate degrees.

Weertman met her husband Johannes at Carnegie, and both later joined the Northwestern University faculty.

== Career ==
In 1986, Julia Weertman was awarded a Guggenheim Fellowship. She became the first woman in the United States to lead a materials science department when she was appointed chair of Northwestern's Department of Materials Science and Engineering the next year. Weertman was elected a member of the National Academy of Engineering in 1988, "for exceptional research on failure mechanisms in high-temperature alloys." In 1989, she became the first female member of the Board of Directors of The Minerals, Metals & Materials Society.

== Fellowships ==
She was also a fellow of the American Academy of Arts and Sciences, ASM International, the American Physical Society, and the American Geophysical Union and the first female Fellow of The Minerals, Metals & Materials Society.

== Recognition ==
Since her death in 2018, several major honors have been established or renamed in her memory:

- Julia and Johannes Weertman Medal: In 2019, the European Geosciences Union renamed its cryosphere medal the Julia and Johannes Weertman Medal.
- TMS Award: The Minerals, Metals & Materials Society (TMS) now grants the Julia and Johannes Weertman Educator Award to recognize excellence in metallurgical education.
- Endowed Positions: Northwestern University now features the Julia Weertman Assistant Professorship, currently held by researchers like Cécile Chazot (as of 2025/2026).

== Death ==
Weertman died, aged 92, on July 31, 2018.
