= Weertman Island =

Island in Graham Land, Antarctica

Weertman Island (66°58′S 67°44′W) is the largest and southernmost of the Bennett Islands, lying in Hanusse Bay. It was mapped from air photos taken by Ronne Antarctic Research Expedition (RARE) (1947–48) and Falkland Islands and Dependencies Aerial Survey Expedition (FIDASE) (1956–57), and named by United Kingdom Antarctic Place-Names Committee (UK-APC) for Johannes Weertman, American metallurgist who proposed a theory of slip of glaciers on their beds and has made important contributions to the theory of glacier flow.

== See also ==
- List of Antarctic and sub-Antarctic islands
