= Maria C. Tamargo =

Cuban-American scientist

- Education: University of Puerto Rico, Johns Hopkins University
- Scientific career
- Fields: semiconductors

Maria C. Tamargo is a leading Cuban-American scientist in compound semiconductors and materials science. She is a CUNY Distinguished Professor of Chemistry at The City College of New York.

== Life and education ==
Maria Tamargo was born in Baton Rouge, Louisiana, in 1951 to Cuban parents. She lived in Havana, Cuba, from 1952 to 1962, at which time she moved with her family to the United States and has lived there ever since.

Maria Tamargo received her first degree (B.S.) in chemistry from the University of Puerto Rico in 1972. She moved to Johns Hopkins University where she completed an M.S. in chemistry in 1974 followed by a Ph.D. in chemistry in 1978.

She is married to MacRae Maxfield, also a chemist and educator, and has two children, Nicolas and Marcela Maxfield.

== Research and career ==
Maria Tamargo's research covers a wide range of compound semiconductors and she has particular expertise in molecular beam epitaxy. Her work spans III-V compounds, strained-layer and short-period superlattices, surface and interface chemistry, visible-light emitters and optoelectronic devices, wide-bandgap II-VI compounds, II-VI/III-V heteroepitaxy, low-dimensional nanostructures, intersubband devices, quantum cascade lasers, and topological insulators (Bi₂Se₃ and related compounds), including magnetic topological materials with high Curie temperatures, which have potential applications in spintronics and quantum computing.

After completing her Ph.D. at Johns Hopkins University she spent several years as technical staff at AT&T Bell Labs (1978-1984) and Bellcore (1984-1993), where she established a research program on the molecular beam epitaxy of wide-bandgap II-VI compounds, with an emphasis on visible-light emitters.

She moved her MBE research program to City College of New York in 1993, becoming a professor of chemistry there. She is a member of the doctoral faculty in chemistry (since 1993) and physics (since 1996) at the CUNY Graduate Center, and of the doctoral faculty of electrical engineering at CCNY's Grove School of Engineering (since 2005). Between 2001 and 2007 she served as Dean of Science at City College of New York, and from 2011 to 2014 she was Executive Officer of the Ph.D. Program in Chemistry at the CUNY Graduate Center.

In 2023, Tamargo was named a CUNY Distinguished Professor, the highest faculty rank CUNY confers. She was one of 12 faculty members elevated to that rank university-wide that year and one of eight with appointments at the CUNY Graduate Center.

Tamargo is the founding director of the National Science Foundation (NSF) CREST Center for Interface Design and Engineered Assembly of Low Dimensional Systems (IDEALS), which she has led since 2016, when it was established with a five-year NSF CREST grant; it is now in its Phase II as a Center of Research Excellence. She previously served as deputy director of the CREST Center CENSES (2010–2015).

Tamargo has served on the editorial boards of the Journal of Vacuum Science and Technology, the Journal of Applied Physics, Semiconductor Science and Technology, and Physica Status Solidi C. She is a member of the National Academy of Engineering, the Materials Research Society, the American Physical Society, and the American Chemical Society.

She has co-authored more than 300 papers in refereed journals, plus eleven book chapters, and holds four patents, with an h-index of 45 (Google Scholar).

== Awards ==
- Fellow, American Physical Society, Division of Materials Physics, elected 2000/2001, "for significant original contributions to the development and understanding of the growth and properties of novel semiconductor materials and heterostructures, in particular, in the field of wide bandgap II-VI compounds."
- MBE Innovator Award, North American Conference on Molecular Beam Epitaxy (NAMBE), 2017, "for advancing the growth of wide-bandgap II-VI semiconductors by molecular beam epitaxy and demonstrating their unique physical properties and potential novel device applications."
- Member, National Academy of Engineering, elected 2020, "for forging the way toward an inclusive science and engineering research community and for contributions to molecular-beam epitaxy of semiconductor materials."
- SACNAS Distinguished Scientist Award, 2021
- CCNY Division of Science Excellence in Mentoring Minorities Award, 2019
- CCNY President's Distinguished Service Award, 2014
- CCNY Alumni Association Latino Group Career Achievement Award, 2010
- CUNY Distinguished Professor of Chemistry, 2023

== Publications ==
Tamargo edited a book titled "II-VI Semiconductor Materials and their Applications", which is part of the series "Optoelectronic properties of semiconductors and superlattices". She has also co-edited Proceedings of the Eleventh International Conference on II-VI Compounds (Physica Status Solidi C, 2004), Epitaxial Growth Processes (Proceedings of the SPIE, 1994), and Proceedings of the Tenth Molecular Beam Epitaxy Workshop (J. Vac. Sci. Technol. B, 1990).
