= Jack L. Koenig =

American chemical engineer (1933–2021)

Jack L. Koenig (1933–2021) was an American chemical engineer noted for pioneering spectroscopic methods of polymer characterization. He played a significant role in developing characterization methods to provide fundamental structure-property relationships for polymers used in thermoplastic and thermoset systems.

Koenig was elected a member of the National Academy of Engineering in 2000 for applications of spectroscopic methods of polymeric materials.

== Education ==
Koenig earned his B.A. in Chemistry and Mathematics from Yankton College and his M.S. and Ph.D. in theoretical chemistry from the University of Nebraska.

== Career ==
Before joining the faculty at Case Institute of Technology in 1963, he worked for a short time at DuPont on spectroscopic methods for characterizing polymers.

Early in his career he was mentored by Goodyear medalist Prof. J. Reid Shelton.

He is known for inventing the infrared method of measuring branches in polyethylene and for the method of determining the molecular weight of insoluble PTFE polymers. Both of his methods are now ASTM standard test methods.

Koenig was promoted to the position of J. Donnell Institute Endowed Chair in the Department of Macromolecular Science and Engineering at Case Western Reserve University in Cleveland, OH in 1990. He retired in 2004 as a professor emeritus from Case Western Reserve University.

== Honors and awards ==
- 1970 - American Physical Society Fellow
- 1984 - Pittsburgh Society Spectroscopy Award
- 1986 - Alexander Von Humboldt Award for Senior U.S. Scientists
- 2000 - Charles Goodyear Medal
- 2000 - Elected to the National Academy of Engineering (U.S.)
- 2006 - Plastics Academy Hall of Fame

== Publications ==
Koenig published 542 articles. His most highly cited articles are:

1. Miller-Chou, B.A., Koenig, J.L. "A review of polymer dissolution." Progress in Polymer Science (Oxford), 2003, 28(8), pp. 1223–1270. https://doi.org/10.1016/S0079-6700(03)00045-5
2. Mathlouthi, M., Koenig, J.L. "Vibrational spectra of carbohydrates." Advances in Carbohydrate Chemistry and Biochemistry, 1987, 44(C), pp. 7–89. https://doi.org/10.1016/S0065-2318(08)60077-3
3. Tuinstra, F., Koenig, J.L. "Characterization of Graphite Fiber Surfaces with Raman Spectroscopy." Journal of Composite Materials, 1970, 4(4), pp. 492–499. https://doi.org/10.1177/002199837000400405
4. Chiang, C.-H., Ishida, H., Koenig, J.L. "The structure of γ-aminopropyltriethoxysilane on glass surfaces." Journal of Colloid And Interface Science, 1980, 74(2), pp. 396–404. https://doi.org/10.1016/0021-9797(80)90209-X
5. Ishida, H., Wellinghoff, S.T., Baer, E., Koenig, J.L. "Spectroscopic Studies of Poly[N,N'-bis(phenoxyphenyl)pyromellitimide]. 1. Structures of the Polyimide and Three Model Compounds." Macromolecules, 1980, 13(4), pp. 826–834. https://doi.org/10.1021/ma60076a011
