= Sangwon Suh =

American industrial ecologist

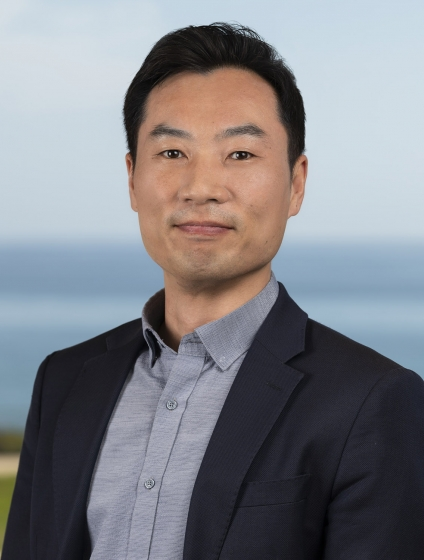
- Born: Seoul, South Korea

Academic background
- Education: BS, MS, Environmental Engineering, Ajou University; PhD, Environmental Science & Engineering, 2004, Leiden University
- Thesis: Materials and energy flows in industry and ecosystem networks: life cycle assessment, input-output analysis, material flow analysis, ecological network flow analysis, and their combinations for industrial ecology (2004)

Academic work
- Institutions: University of California, Santa Barbara; University of Minnesota College of Food, Agricultural and Natural Resource Sciences; Carnegie Mellon University

Sangwon Suh is an American industrial ecologist.

== Early life and education ==
Suh was born in Seoul, South Korea, where he spent his childhood. Suh served the South Korean military (army) and was discharged as a sergeant. Suh completed his Bachelor of Science and Master's degree in environmental engineering from Ajou University in South Korea. Following this, he moved to the Netherlands and enrolled at Leiden University for his PhD.

== Career ==
During his PhD research, Suh contributed to two books, The Computational Structure of Life Cycle Assessment and Handbook on life cycle assessment: operational guide to the ISO standards.

Upon completing his PhD (cum laude), Suh taught in the Department of Civil and Environmental Engineering at Carnegie Mellon University for one year before joining the University of Minnesota College of Food, Agricultural and Natural Resource Sciences as an assistant professor. While there, Suh used a life-cycle assessment approach to quantify the environmental effect of products and services. He analyzed 44 greenhouse gas emissions among about 500 product and service groups throughout the United States economy and determined that service sectors produced less than 5% of the nation's overall greenhouse gas emissions directly, while 37.6% of the nation's total greenhouse gas emissions were generated directly and indirectly to support service sectors throughout the supply chain. Suh contributed to the development of methods and data for quantifying climate change and other environmental and natural resource impacts of producing, using, and disposing of goods and services. In particular, Suh and his colleagues contributed to the development and applications of input-output LCA (EIO-LCA) and its combination with process analysis, called hybrid approach. In 2009 Suh published an edited volume, Handbook of Input-Output Economics in Industrial Ecology.

In 2009, Suh's research team was the first to compare water use in corn-ethanol production on a state-by-state basis. As a result, he was awarded the McKnight Land-Grand Professorship in 2009 and 2010 by the University of Minnesota, and received the International Society for Industrial Ecology's Robert A. Laudise Prize. Due to his research, Suh was appointed as one of the 28 members of the International Resources Panel of the United Nations Environment Programme.

Suh contributed to the development of international standards on Life Cycle Assessment and carbon accounting. In 2009, Suh was appointed as a member of the working group organized by the World Resources Institute and the World Business Council for Sustainable Development that was in charge of drafting the Greenhouse Gas Protocol standards. Suh served the Technical Committee 207 of the International Organization for Standardization (ISO) in its effort to produce ISO standards on greenhouse gas emissions reporting, communication, and management (ISO 14064 and ISO 14068) as a Technical Liaison by the Society of Environmental Toxicology and Chemistry.

Suh left the University of Minnesota to join the Bren School of Environmental Science & Management as an associate professor in 2010. As a faculty member, Suh and members of various faculties established the Sustainable Chemical Network to track the health and environmental impacts of new substances. In this collaboration, they created an online tool called the Chemical Life-Cycle Collaborative (CLiCC) to quantify the environmental and health implications of new synthetic chemicals and materials over their life cycles. Suh received the Leontief Memorial Prize by the International Input-Output Association (IIOA) in 2011 with a paper entitled "The Structure of Life-Cycle Environmental Impact of the U.S. Economy". He also received the Sir Richard Stone Award from the same organization in that year. In 2017, Suh was named the lead principal investigator of the Reducing Embodied-energy and Decreasing Emissions (R.E.M.A.D.E.) project to improve energy efficiency.

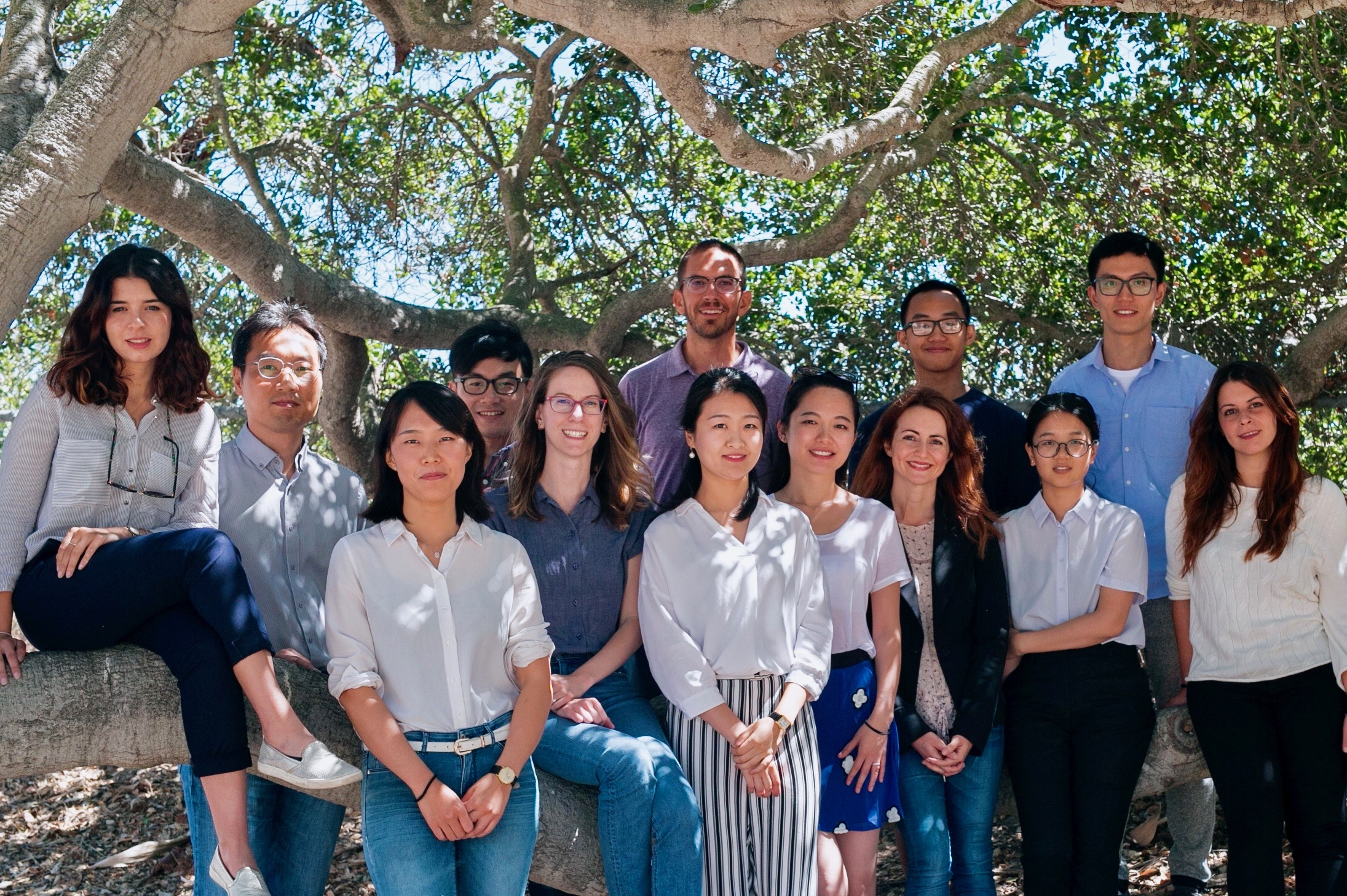
Together with the members of the Suhstainability lab

In 2013, Suh was appointed as a Coordinating Lead Author of the Intergovernmental Panel on Climate Change (IPCC), under which he co-authored the IPCC Fifth Assessment Report and corresponding Summary for Policy Makers.

In 2019, Suh was appointed as the founding Editor-in-Chief of the Frontiers in Sustainability, a peer-reviewed scientific journal published by Frontiers Media.

During the COVID-19 pandemic, Suh was selected as the recipient of the 2020 Rita Schenck Lifetime Individual Leadership in LCA Award. He was also recognized on Clarivate Analytics's Highly Cited Researchers as a scientist who ranked in the top 1% by citations for field and publication year. The following year, Suh was elected a member of the Royal Society of Arts for his global leadership in sustainability solutions.

== Entrepreneurship ==
In 2005, Suh founded VitalMetrics Inc, a data-as-a-service company for carbon accounting and life-cycle assessment. In 2023, VitalMetrics was acquired by Watershed, a sustainability software company serving Fortune 500 clients including Walmart, FedEx, and BlackRock, and Suh joined Watershed in full time as Head of Science since the acquisition.

Suh also co-founded Carbon Minds, a German software and data firm specialized in sustainability measurement of chemical industry in 2019. He serves Carbon Minds as a scientific advisor.

== Philanthropy ==
In 2018, Suh founded a not-for-profit initiative, Adopt a Cookstove Today (ACT) aiming to disseminate high efficiency cookstoves and replace inefficient three stone fire and charcoal stoves in rural Africa. Through this initiative, Suh and his team support underprivileged rural communities in Africa to improve the welfare of women and children and to reduce greenhouse gas emissions and indoor air pollution.

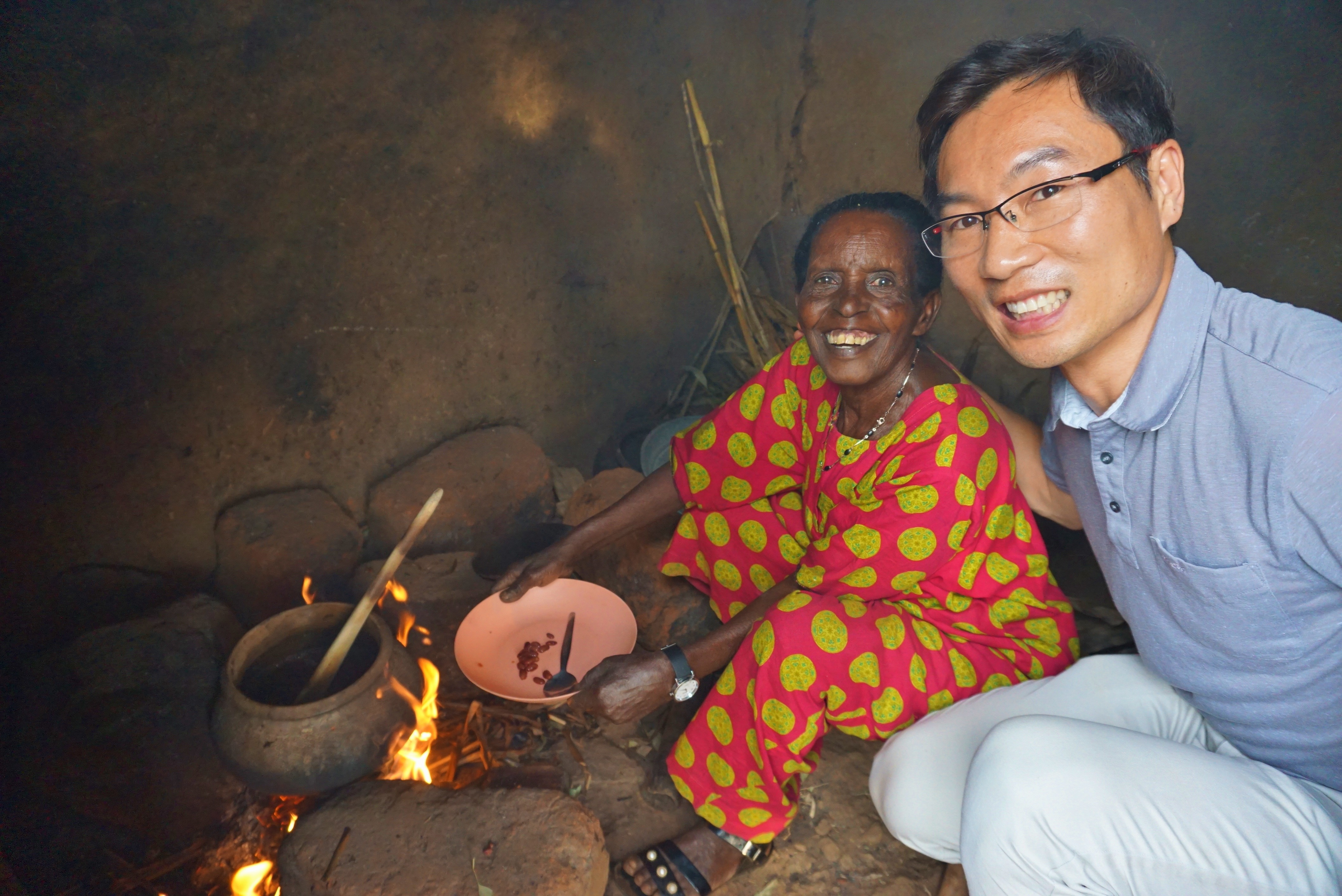
Dr. Suh posing with a co-op member in Kayonza district, who just made a three-stone fire for cooking.

Since 2019, Suh is serving a local philanthropic organization, World Dance for Humanity, as a board member. The organization supports 28 underprivileged communities in rural Rwanda.

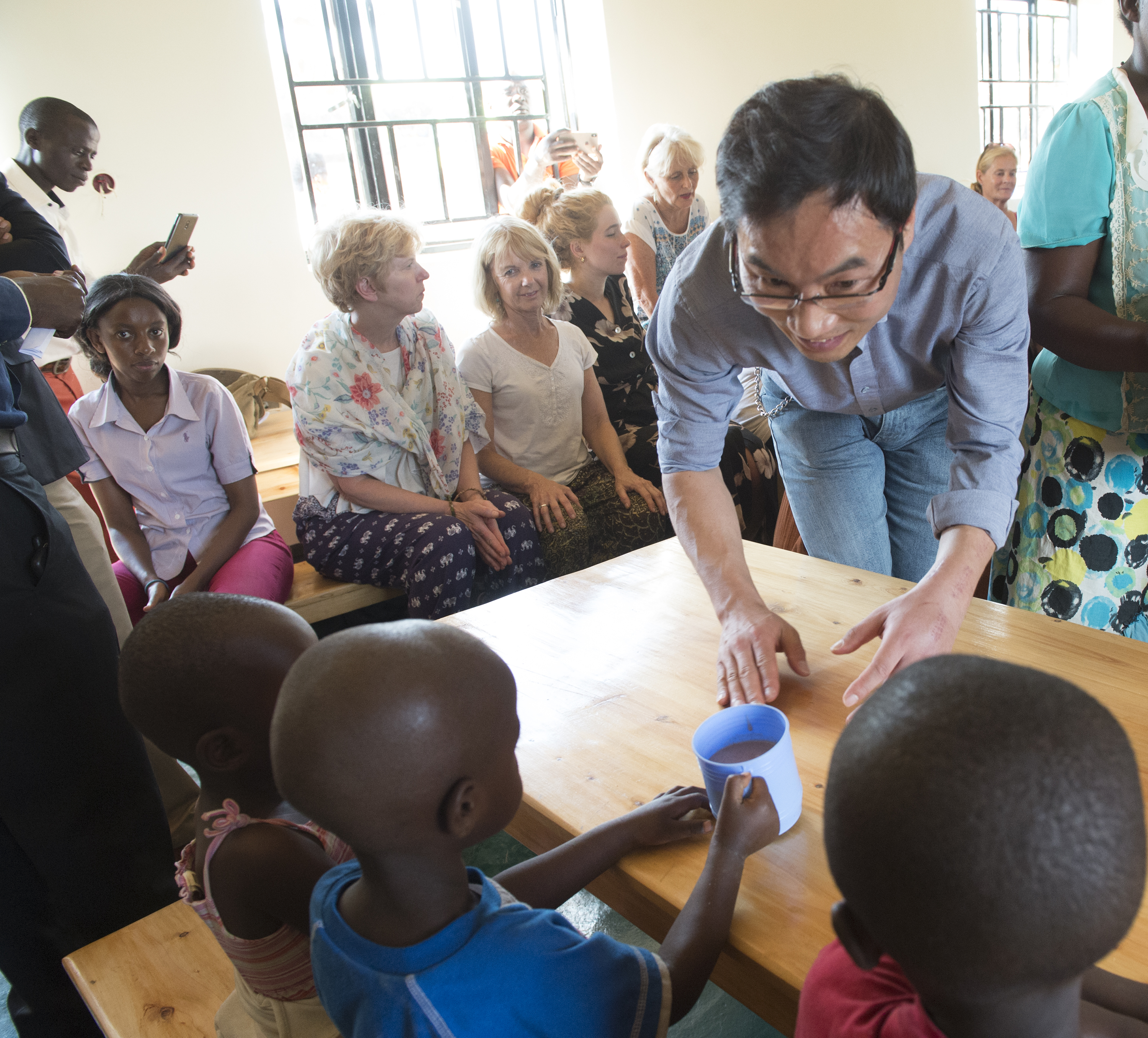
Dr. Suh serving milk to children at a preschool in Kayonza, Rwanda

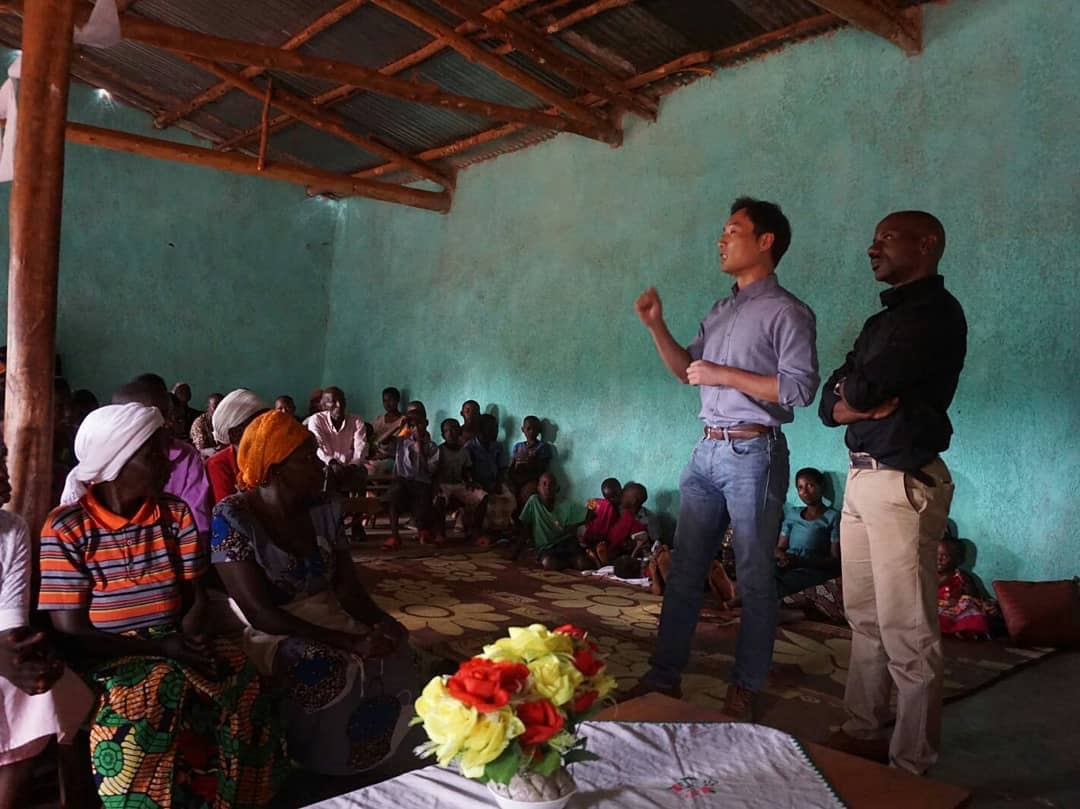
Dr. Sangwon Suh giving a talk on the transformative nature of education at a co-op established by single moms fled from threats by their own families and communities
