= Supratik Guha =

Indian-American materials scientist

Supratik Guha is an Indian–American materials scientist.

Guha graduated from the Indian Institute of Technology, Kharagpur in 1985 and earned a doctorate in materials science from the University of Southern California in 1991. Between 1995 and 2015, he worked for IBM. He headed the Center for Nanoscale Materials from 2015 to 2019. After vacating the directorship, Guha remained a senior adviser to Argonne National Laboratory and on the faculty of the University of Chicago.

Guha was elected a fellow of the American Physical Society in 2009, "[f]or his leadership in semiconductor materials and devices and, in particular, for providing the scientific and technological underpinnings of the high dielectric constant gate stack scheduled to replace the venerable silicon dioxide gate film in field-effect transistor products in IBM." In 2015, Guha was cited "[f]or contributions to field-effect transistor technology that allow continued scaling of silicon microelectronics" in his election to the National Academy of Engineering.
