= Kenneth A. Jackson =

American businessman

Kenneth A. Jackson is a businessman in Baltimore, Maryland, with alleged past connections to the illegal drug trade in the city. He is alleged to be one of the Baltimore figures whose stories are dramatized in the HBO series The Wire, but his actual influence upon the show is disputed. The connections among drug trafficking, legitimate businesses, and political donations depicted in The Wire reflect aspects of Jackson's life.

== Early life ==
Jackson was born in 1957 and raised in the Latrobe Homes in East Baltimore.

When he was seventeen, he committed his first murder when he killed a Baltimore business man during a robbery. With drug and gang influence Jackson was able to secure a high-profile lawyer and gain an acquittal on a technicality.

== Criminal career ==
He was convicted in 1978 for manslaughter, in 1979 for resisting arrest, and in 1984 on a drug charge. Jackson took an Alford plea in 1977 on a charge of manslaughter, and his sentence was suspended.

Jackson's name appeared in the Baltimore Sun's 1987 series Easy Money: Anatomy of a Drug Empire, the author of which was David Simon, who went on to be the creator, executive producer, and head writer of The Wire. In the newspaper series, Simon claims that Jackson used to be one of the trusted surrogates of Melvin Williams, a legendary Baltimore heroin dealer whose story influenced The Wire character Avon Barksdale. Jackson explicitly denies any past connection to Williams. Jackson is believed to be responsible for initiating a 1981 drug war for control of the Lafayette Court housing project. In the mid-1980s Jackson was convicted on a federal gun charge, but was acquitted of murder charges in 1991. In 1992, Jackson pled a bribery charge down to one count of giving false information to a state trooper. Federal tax-evasion charges were dropped in 1994.

== Business career ==
By 1984, Jackson owned a mini-market, a shoe store, a produce and carry-out stand, rental properties in West Baltimore, and ran his family's business. But his most successful business venture has been the Eldorado Lounge, an adult entertainment club in East Baltimore. In 1978, Jackson's mother, Rosalie, acquired the Eldorado Lounge from Michael Stewart. Rosalie hired Kenny to manage the club; and in 1986, Kenny advanced the Eldorado Lounge's format. The Eldorado Lounge property was sold in 2000 but re-emerged in 2003 at a different location on East Lombard Street, outside downtown. Kenny Jackson continues to run the Eldorado Lounge there. In 2007, Jackson earned a business degree from American InterContinental University in Atlanta, Georgia.

== Political activities ==
In 1995, Jackson was involved in establishing a political action committee ("PAC") that advocated for convicts' voting rights. The PAC donated a total of $8,000 to the campaigns of various Democratic political candidates, including then-mayor Kurt Schmoke and future mayor Sheila Dixon. Jackson's PAC no longer operates.

After the Eldorado Lounge property was sold, Jackson contributed $2,500 to then-City Council President Dixon. Dixon was criticized for her role in the sale of the property after a story regarding the sale appeared in the Baltimore Sun in 2000. Then-Mayor Martin O'Malley returned $2,000 which he had received from Rosalie. Rosalie also donated $1,000 to Al Gore's 2000 presidential primary campaign.

== Possible connections to The Wire ==
In Season 5 of The Wire, the show's fictional Sun reports on the sale of a strip-club property owned by a drug dealer, Fat Face Rick. Nerese Campbell, the fictional City Council President is then shown angrily reading a critical newspaper article about her role in the sale. The anecdote appears to allude to Sheila Dixon's part in the sale of the Eldorado Lounge.

Another similarity to Jackson's life is the entrepreneurial impulse of Stringer Bell, the number-two in Barksdale's organization. In Season 1 of The Wire, detective Jimmy McNulty tracks Bell to his business course at a local community college. According to Jackson, Baltimore police actually were present while he took classes at Baltimore Community College. On the show, Bell strives to become a part of the legitimate business world and even gets involved in bribing politicians.

Jackson has collaborated with Nathan Barksdale on an unreleased docudrama titled Baltimore Chronicles: Legends of the Unwired, which purports to be the true story of Avon Barksdale and The Wire.
