= Wolfspeed =

American semiconductor manufacturer

Wolfspeed, Inc.
- Formerly: Cree, Inc. (1999–2021)
- Type: Public
- Traded as: NYSE: WOLF; Nasdaq: CREE (1993–2021
- Industry: Electronics
- Founded: 1987; 39 years ago
- Headquarters: Research Triangle Park, North Carolina, US
- Products: Wide-bandgap semiconductors
- Revenue: ▲US$807 million (2024)
- Operating income: ▼US$–445 million (2024)
- Net income: ▼US$–864 million (2024)
- Total assets: ▲US$7.98 billion (2024)
- Total equity: ▼US$882 million (2024)
- Number of employees: 5,013 (2024)
- Website: wolfspeed.com

Wolfspeed, Inc. is an American developer and manufacturer of wide-bandgap semiconductors, focused on silicon carbide materials and devices for power applications such as transportation, power supplies, power inverters, and wireless systems. The company was formerly named Cree, Inc.

== History ==
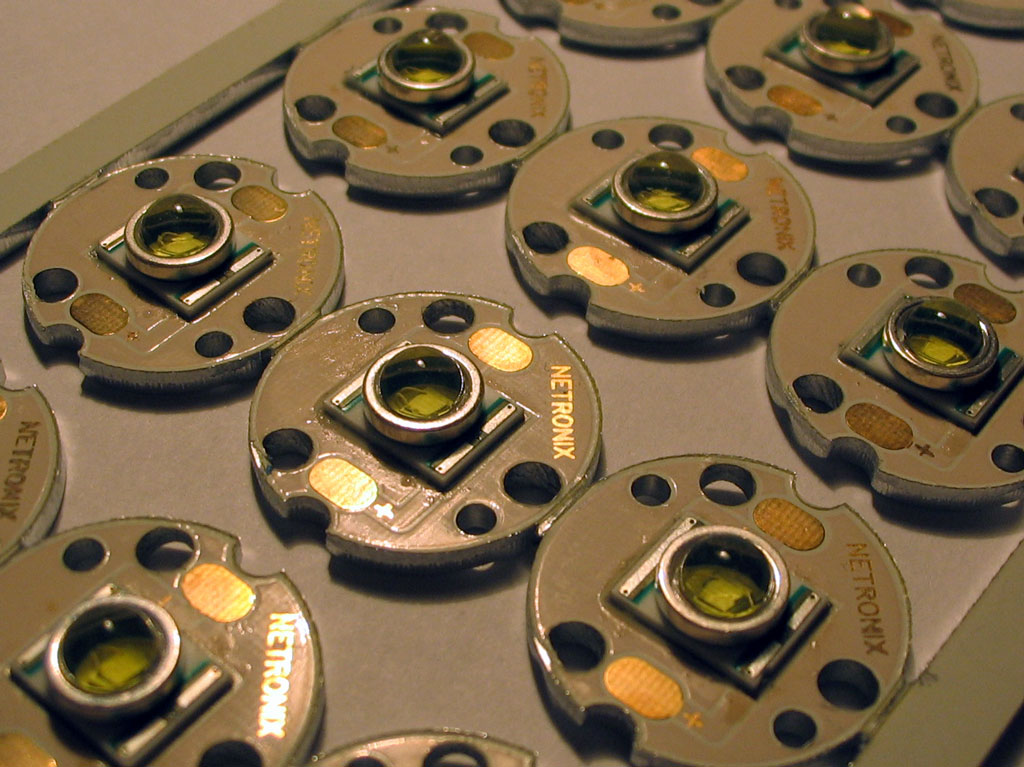
XLamp 7090 XR-E Q4

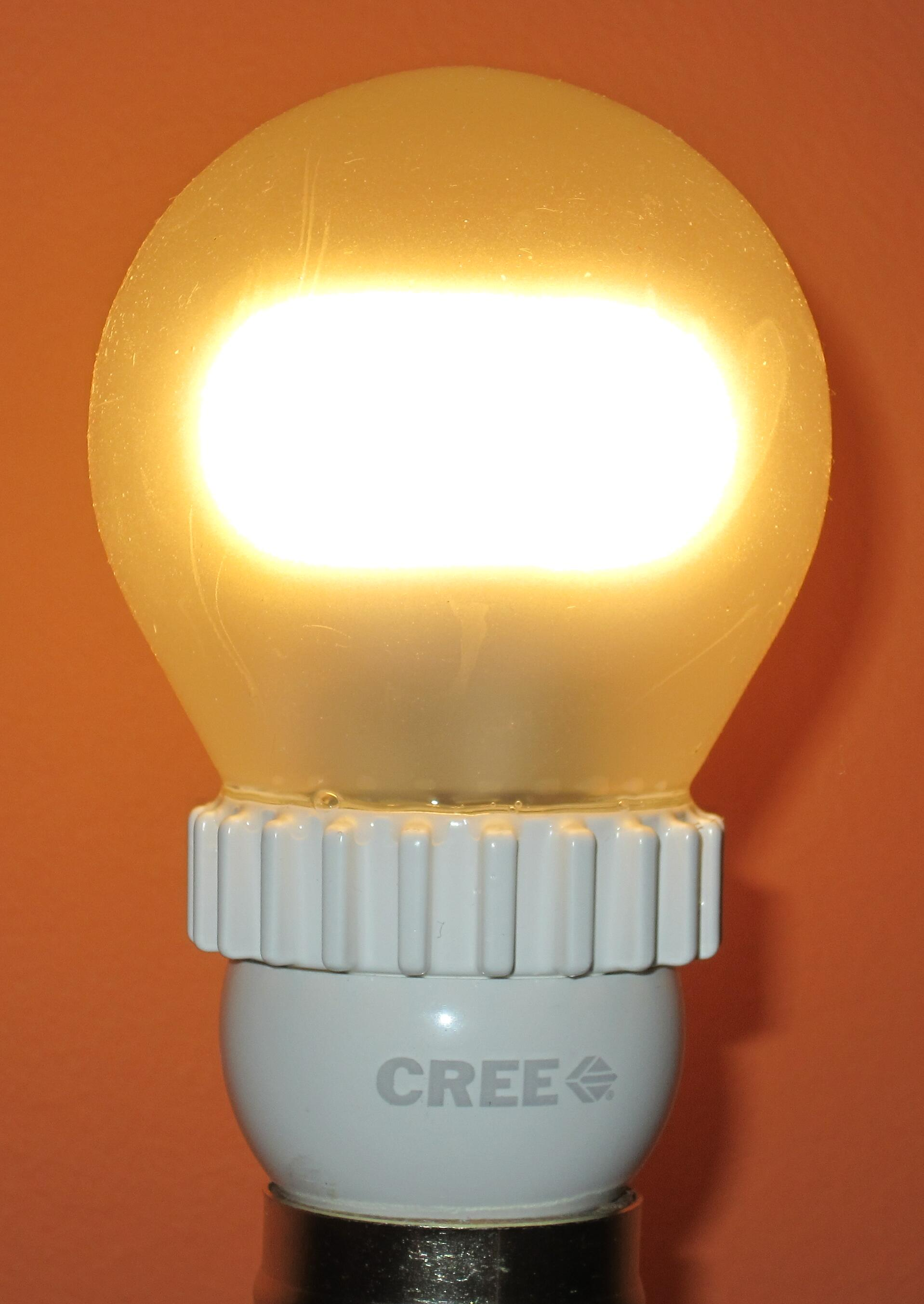
9.5 watt 800 lumen dimmable lamp bulb, with 2700 K color temperature, introduced in March 2013

Cree Research was founded in July 1987 in Durham, North Carolina. Five of the six founders – Neal Hunter, Thomas Coleman, John Edmond, Eric Hunter, John Palmour, and Calvin Carter – are graduates of North Carolina State University.

In 1983, the founders – one a research assistant professor and the others student researchers – were seeking ways to leverage the properties of silicon carbide to enable semiconductors to operate at higher operating temperatures and power levels. They also knew silicon carbide could serve as the diode in light-emitting diode (LED) lighting, a light source first demonstrated in 1907 with an electrically charged diode of silicon carbide. The research team devised a way to grow silicon crystals in the laboratory, and in 1987 founded the company to produce silicon carbide to be used commercially in both semiconductors and lighting.

In 1989, the company introduced the first blue LED, enabling the development of large, full-color video screens and billboards.

In 1991, the company released the first commercial silicon carbide wafer.

In 1993, the company became a public company via an initial public offering.

In 1999, the company name was changed from Cree Research to Cree, Inc.

In 2011, the company acquired Ruud Lighting for $525 million.

In August 2011, the company announced the XLamp XT-E Royal Blue LED for use in remote phosphor lighting.

In 2013, the company's first consumer products, two household LED bulbs, qualified for Energy Star rating by the United States Environmental Protection Agency.

In July 2016, Infineon Technologies agreed to acquire the company's Wolfspeed RF and power electronics devices unit for $850 million. However, the deal was terminated in February 2017 due to regulators’ national security concerns.

In March 2018, the company acquired Infineon Technologies AG's RF Power Business for €345 million.

In May 2019, the company sold its Lighting Products division (now branded as Cree Lighting) to Ideal Industries.

In September 2019, the company announced a $1 billion investment in a semiconductor manufacturing plant in Marcy, New York, to build the world’s largest silicon carbide fabrication facility with a $500 million grant from New York State.

In March 2021, the company sold its LED business (Cree LED) to SMART Global Holdings (SGH), which later became Penguin Solutions, for up to $300 million.

Cree Inc. logo, used prior to the October 2021 rebranding

In October 2021, the company changed its name to Wolfspeed.

In April 2022, the Marcy, New York, facility opened. New York governor Kathy Hochul and U.S. senator Chuck Schumer spoke at the event.

In November 2022, the company announced that co-founder and Chief Technology Officer John Palmour had died.

In February 2023 it announced it would build its first European factory in Germany. It is supposed to be on the site of a former coal plant in Ensdorf, Saarland, with ZF Friedrichshafen as a coinvestor and subsidized by the EU as an important project of common European interest (IPCEI) for Microelectronics and Communication Technologies.

In August 2023, it was announced the Lowell-headquartered semiconductor company, MACOM had entered into a definitive agreement to acquire Wolfspeed's RF business.

In June 2024, Wolfspeed delayed its $3 billion semiconductor plant in Germany to mid-2025, exacerbating concerns among analysts that the European Union could miss its target of 20% semiconductor market share. Wolfspeed announced the project's indefinite hold in October 2024, citing low demand. As a result, ZF ceased to take part in the project.

In October 2024, the Biden Administration announced that it would provide Wolfspeed with up to $750 million in direct funding to support the company's new silicon carbide factory in North Carolina that makes the wafers used in advanced computer chips and its factory in Marcy, New York.

On May 20, 2025, it was reported that Wolfspeed was preparing to file for Chapter 11 bankruptcy within the coming weeks after warning that it may be unable to continue future operations after lower than expected annual sales were reported. Wolfspeed's stock slid to barely over a dollar per share that day.

On June 18, 2025, Wolfspeed announced that they would sell itself to Apollo Global Management in a deal that would put the company into a prepackaged Chapter 11 bankruptcy filing, which would allow for the elimination of the majority of its multi-billion dollar debt. Wolfspeed entered into a restructuring support agreement with its lenders and Renesas Electronics, and announced that they would file for prepackaged Chapter 11 bankruptcy by July 1, as part of a plan to eliminate $4.6 billion of debt, stating they only had about $1.1 billion left in cash. The company will also receive $275 million in financing backed by its lenders, with plans to complete restructuring by Q3 2025. After the announcement, Wolfspeed's stock fell 30%, sliding under $1 per share. On June 26, 2025, Wolfspeed began laying off employees from their manufacturing facility located in Racine, Wisconsin. On June 30, 2025, Wolfspeed filed for Chapter 11 bankruptcy protection.

On September 9, 2025, Wolfspeed's stock went up to $1.82 per share after a U.S. bankruptcy judge approved its Chapter 11 bankruptcy plan that would allow it to exit bankruptcy with over 70% of its debt reduced and eliminate 60% of cash interest payments. On September 29, 2025, Wolfspeed canceled its old shares and gave shareholders new shares, which surged in a gain of over 1000%. That same day, the company announced that it had exited Chapter 11 bankruptcy.

On October 7, 2026 Wolfspeed announced it had received conditional commitment for a 30 year $1.5 billion loan from the United States Department of Defense in exchange for a 7.5% equity stake.

== Semiconductor Technology ==
Wolfspeed specializes in silicon carbide (SiC) materials and power semiconductor devices, including SiC wafers, epitaxial materials, discrete power devices, and power modules used in high-voltage and high-efficiency power electronics applications. Reuters described Wolfspeed as a company focused on silicon carbide chips for applications such as electric vehicle powertrains, renewable energy systems, battery storage, and industrial power electronics.

Compared with conventional silicon-based power semiconductors, silicon carbide devices can operate at higher voltages, higher temperatures, and improved switching efficiency, characteristics that make them useful in electric vehicles, renewable energy systems, industrial power conversion, aerospace, and fast-charging infrastructure. Wolfspeed’s own technical materials describe silicon carbide as a high-efficiency wide-bandgap semiconductor platform for these applications.

Wolfspeed has also developed 200 mm silicon carbide wafer technology, and in 2025 announced the commercial launch of 200 mm SiC wafers and epitaxial materials intended to support manufacturing scale and device production for next-generation power semiconductor applications. Reuters also reported that Wolfspeed transitioned parts of its device business to a 200 mm silicon carbide fabrication platform as part of its manufacturing strategy.

== Incidents ==
On October 13, 2022, a facilities electrician was electrocuted at the Wolfspeed Research Triangle Park in Durham, North Carolina. The incident sparked a state investigation into his death as well as public concern for the company's poor work safety record. State Department of Labor investigations into the company have uncovered 17 workplace safety violations between 2012 and 2023, including six serious violations.
