= John Williams Palmour =

Co-founder of Wolfspeed (1960–2022)

John Williams Palmour (October 14, 1960 – November 13, 2022) was co-founder and chief technology officer of Wolfspeed in Durham, North Carolina. He was named a Fellow of the Institute of Electrical and Electronics Engineers (IEEE) in 2013 for his work in the development and commercialization of wide-bandgap semiconductor devices.

Palmour died on November 13, 2022, aged 62.
