= C. Jeffrey Brinker =

American materials scientist and engineer

- Born: Charles Jeffrey Brinker; Easton, Pennsylvania, U.S.
- Education: Rutgers University (BS, MS, PhD)
- Known for: Sol-gel processing Evaporation-induced self-assembly (EISA); Mesoporous materials Protocells
- Awards: Ernest Orlando Lawrence Award (2002); Materials Research Society Medal (2003)
- Honors: Member, National Academy of Engineering; Member, National Academy of Inventors; Member, National Academy of Sciences; Fellow, American Academy of Arts and Sciences
- Scientific career
- Fields: Materials science Chemical engineering Nanotechnology
- Workplaces: Sandia National Laboratories; University of New Mexico

Charles Jeffrey Brinker (known as C. Jeffrey Brinker) is an American materials scientist and engineer. He is a Distinguished and Regents' Professor Emeritus at the University of New Mexico (UNM) and a Sandia Fellow Emeritus at Sandia National Laboratories. Brinker is best known for his pioneering research in sol-gel processing, molecular self-assembly, porous and nanostructured materials, and the development of mesoporous silica–lipid hybrid nanoparticles known as protocells for targeted drug delivery. He is a member of the National Academy of Engineering, the National Academy of Inventors, and the National Academy of Sciences, and a Fellow of the American Academy of Arts and Sciences.

== Early life and education ==
Brinker was born in Easton, Pennsylvania. He attended Rutgers University, where he earned a Bachelor of Science degree with high honors in 1972, a Master of Science degree in 1975, and a Ph.D. in 1978, all in Ceramic Science and Engineering.

== Career ==
Brinker began his professional career at Sandia National Laboratories in 1979 as a member of the technical staff, later serving as a Distinguished Member of the Technical Staff until 1998. In 1991, Brinker also began a joint academic appointment at the University of New Mexico (UNM) as Distinguished National Laboratory Professor of Chemistry and Chemical and Nuclear Engineering, serving in this role until 1999. In 1999, he was appointed Professor of Chemistry and Chemical and Nuclear Engineering at UNM, a position he held until 2006.

From 1999 to 2003, Brinker concurrently served as a Senior Scientist in the Chemical Synthesis and Nanomaterials Department at Sandia National Laboratories. In 2003, he was named a Laboratory Fellow at Sandia and served in that role until 2019.

At UNM, Brinker was appointed Regents’ Professor of Chemical and Nuclear Engineering and Molecular Genetics and Microbiology in 2006 and designated Distinguished Professor in 2008. In 2010, he became a member of the UNM Comprehensive Cancer Center. From 2006 to 2020, he also served as a Distinguished Affiliate Scientist at the Center for Integrated Nanotechnologies, a U.S. Department of Energy research center. Since 2020, he has served as an associate editor of ACS Nano. Following his retirement from full-time academic duties, he was named Distinguished and Regents’ Professor Emeritus at UNM.

== Research ==
Brinker’s research spans sol–gel chemistry, porous and nanostructured materials, organic–inorganic hybrid materials, and nano–bio interfaces. A recurring theme of his work has been the investigation of relationships between synthesis methods, material structure, and resulting physical and chemical properties in solution-derived inorganic systems. His work has also explored biomimetic approaches to materials design, in which structural features observed in natural systems are replicated using inorganic materials.

In parallel with his research activities, Brinker played a role in promoting interdisciplinary approaches within materials science, including through his involvement with the Materials Research Society symposium series Better Ceramics Through Chemistry, which ran through multiple editions during the 1980s and 1990s and later evolved into symposium series on organic–inorganic hybrid materials.

He co-authored the textbook Sol-Gel Science: The Physics and Chemistry of Sol-Gel Processing (1990), which describes the physical and chemical principles underlying sol–gel processing and has been widely cited in the materials science literature. His early research examined mechanisms of hydrolysis, condensation, gelation, and sintering in silicate systems, contributing to the development of glasses, thin film coatings, and particulate materials processed under relatively mild conditions.

During the 1990s, Brinker and collaborators developed an ambient-pressure drying method for silica aerogels, addressing limitations associated with supercritical drying. The approach involved surface modification of wet gels to reduce condensation reactions and capillary stresses during drying, allowing the material to recover porosity after shrinkage. This work demonstrated a pathway toward lower-cost aerogel production and influenced subsequent commercial manufacturing methods.

In the late 1990s, Brinker and collaborators introduced evaporation-induced self-assembly (EISA), a processing strategy in which solvent evaporation promotes the organization of surfactant–inorganic composites into ordered mesoporous materials. The method enabled the fabrication of mesoporous silica as uniform thin films via dip coating and was later extended to the formation of spherical mesoporous nanoparticles using aerosol-assisted processing.

Subsequent studies expanded EISA-based approaches to include organic–inorganic nanocomposites, ordered nanoparticle–silica arrays, optically responsive nanopores, and low-dielectric mesoporous films. EISA-based methods have since been applied in the fabrication of membranes, sensors, low-dielectric materials, and nanocomposites across materials science and nanotechnology.

From the late 2000s onward, Brinker’s research increasingly addressed nano–bio interfaces and applications in nanomedicine. This work included the development of mesoporous silica nanoparticles encapsulated by supported lipid bilayers, commonly referred to as protocells, designed for the delivery of therapeutic and diagnostic cargos. Such systems have been investigated for applications in cancer therapy, vaccine delivery, and biosensor development.

== Selected honors and awards ==
- W. H. Zachariasen Award for best contribution to the glass literature (1988), Journal of Non-Crystalline Solids
- Fellow, American Ceramic Society (1990)
- Elected to the National Academy of Engineering (2002)
- Ernest Orlando Lawrence Award, U.S. Department of Energy (2002)
- Materials Research Society Medal, Materials Research Society (2003)
- Edward R. Orton Jr. Memorial Award, American Ceramic Society and ASM International (2008)
- Fellow of the Materials Research Society (2009)
- Robert B. Sosman Award, American Ceramic Society (2010)
- Elected to the Board of Directors, Materials Research Society (2014)
- University of New Mexico STC Innovation Fellow Award (2015)
- UNM Presidential Medal of Distinction, University of New Mexico (2015)
- Elected to the National Academy of Inventors (2015)
- Lifetime Achievement Award, International Sol-Gel Society (2017)
- Elected to the American Academy of Arts and Sciences (2018)
- Elected to the National Academy of Sciences (2021)

== Books ==
- Brinker, C. J.; Clark, D. E.; Ulrich, D. R. (eds.). Better Ceramics Through Chemistry. North-Holland, 1984.
- Brinker, C. J.; Clark, D. E.; Ulrich, D. R. (eds.). Better Ceramics Through Chemistry II. Materials Research Society, 1986.
- Brinker, C. J.; Clark, D. E.; Ulrich, D. R. (eds.). Better Ceramics Through Chemistry III. Materials Research Society, 1988.
- Brinker, C. J.; Scherer, G. W. Sol-Gel Science: The Physics and Chemistry of Sol-Gel Processing. Academic Press, San Diego, 1990.
- Brinker, C. J.; Clark, D. E.; Ulrich, D. R. (eds.). Better Ceramics Through Chemistry IV. Materials Research Society, 1990.
- Brinker, C. J.; Clark, D. E.; Ulrich, D. R. (eds.). Better Ceramics Through Chemistry V. Materials Research Society, 1992.
- Brinker, C. J.; Clark, D. E.; Ulrich, D. R. (eds.). Better Ceramics Through Chemistry VI. Materials Research Society, 1994.
- Brinker, C. J. (co-author). Nanotechnology Research Directions for Societal Needs in 2020: Retrospective and Outlook. Springer, 2010.
