= Karen I. Winey =

American materials scientist

- Education: Cornell University (BS); University of Massachusetts Amherst (MS, PhD)
- Scientific career
- Fields: Chemical engineering Material science Polymer morphologies Polymer electrolytes Polymer nanocomposites
- Workplaces: University of Pennsylvania
- Thesis: Morphologies and morphological transitions in binary blends of diblock copolymer and homopolymer (1991)
- Doctoral advisor: Edwin L. Thomas

Karen Irene Winey is an American polymer scientist with a 50:50 appointment in Chemical and Biomolecular Engineering and Materials Science Engineering at the University of Pennsylvania.

== Education ==
Winey majored in materials science and engineering for her undergraduate degree (1985) at Cornell University. Winey earned her masters (1989) and PhD (1991) in polymer science and engineering at the University of Massachusetts Amherst, the latter in the laboratory of Edwin L. Thomas. She completed a postdoc under Ronald G. Larson at Bell Labs. While at Cornell, Winey was a McMullen Scholar, and while at the University of Massachusetts Winey received a Graduate Student Fellowship from the National Science Foundation.

== Career Overview ==
Winey is currently the Pender Professor of Engineering at the University of Pennsylvania, where she has taught since 1992. From XX to YY, Winey was the Towerbrook Faculty Fellow. She has also served as the department chair of the materials science and engineering department from 2016 to 2021. During her time as department chair she hired Erich Stach, Liang Feng, Vanessa Chan, and Chris Madl. Winey continues to serve as the faculty director of the Dual Source and Environmental X-ray Scattering (DEXS) facility with Penn's Laboratory for Research on the Structure of Matter (LRSM).

She has mentored students as part of the Research and Education in Active Technologies for the Human Habitat program in collaboration with the Grenoble Innovation for Advanced New Technologies. In 2020, Winey won the Braskem Award for Excellence in Materials Engineering and Science for her work in nanocomposites and ion-containing polymers. She has been a Penn Engineering Wellness Ambassador.

Winey is known internationally for her work using X-ray scattering to characterize polymers, including a recent collaboration with the University of Konstanz. Her lab also focuses on solid polymer electrolyte materials (with such applications as batteries) to replace materials like Nafion. Winey has described Nafion as "something of a fluke. Its structure has been the subject of debate for decades, and will likely never be fully understood or controlled." Winey's group uses scattering and imaging techniques to characterize nanoscale morphologies of polymers and relate them to their ion transport properties.

== Recognitions ==
In 2003, Winey was named a Fellow of the American Physical Society (APS), after a nomination from the APS Division of Polymer Physics, "for exquisite application of electron microscopy and x-ray scattering to the determination of the microstructure of polymers and to elucidating the role of microdomain geometry on polymer properties". In 2012 she received the National Science Foundation George H. Heilmeier Faculty Award for Excellence in Research.
