= Johannes Weertman =

American materials scientist

Johannes Weertman (May 11, 1925 – October 13, 2018) was an American materials scientist and geophysicist.

== Biography ==
Born in 1925 in Fairfield, Alabama, Weertman served in the United States Marine Corps for three years. He then received from Carnegie Institute of Technology his bachelor's degree in 1948 and his Ph.D. in physics in 1951 under the supervision of James Koehler. As a postdoc Weertman was a Fulbright Fellow at the École Normale Supérieure in Paris. Beginning in 1952 he was at the US Naval Research Laboratory. At Northwestern University he became in 1959 an associate professor and then a full professor; in 1963 he became there a professor of geophysics and from 1968 Walter P. Murphy Professor for Materials Science and Engineering (now professor emeritus).

He was from 1967 to 1991 a consultant for the Los Alamos National Laboratory. In 1964 he was a visiting professor at Caltech. From 1960 to 1975 he was a consultant for the US Army Cold Regions Research and Engineering Laboratory. He was also a consultant for the Bain Laboratory of the US Steel Corporation and Oak Ridge National Laboratory. In 1986 he was a visiting scientist at the Swiss reactor research institute and in 1971–1972 at Scott Polar Research Institute in Cambridge.

Our research areas are the mechanical properties of metals, including fatigue and fracture of metals, the high-temperature creep of crystalline solids, and dislocation theory applied to these phenomena. We are developing dislocation-based solutions of the plastic regions around stressed cracks. These solutions rely on dislocation crack tip shielding and dislocation crack extension force conditions. ... In the area of geophysics, we recently developed a theory for the migration of subglacial lakes under ice sheets and earthquake dislocations moving at a transonic velocity on a fault separating rock of sightly different elastic constants.In the area of geophysics, our primary research area is in the theory of the flow of glaciers and ice sheets.

Weertman Island off Antarctica is named after him. Weertman was married since 1950 to Julia Randall Weertman and had a son and a daughter. He died on October 13, 2018, at the age of 93.

== Awards and honors ==
- Seligman Crystal of the International Glaciological Society, 1983
- Acta Metallurgica Gold Medal, 1980
- Champion H. Mathewson Gold Medal of the Metallurgical Society of AIME for work on creep and fatigue fracture, 1977
- Guggenheim Fellowship, 1970
- Robert E. Horton Medal, American Geophysical Union, 1962
- Fulbright Fellowship, 1951
- Fellow of Geological Society of America, 1970
- Fellow of the American Physical Society, 1975
- Fellow of the American Geophysical Union, 1982

== Selected publications ==
- with Julia R. Weertman: Elementary dislocation theory, Macmillan 1964, Oxford University Press 1993
- Dislocation based fracture mechanics, World Scientific 1996
- Weertman, J. (1957). "On the sliding of glaciers" (PDF). Journal of Glaciology. 3 (21): 33–38. Bibcode:1957JGlac...3...33W. doi:10.1017/S0022143000024709.
- Weertman, J. (1957). "Steady-state creep through dislocation climb". Journal of Applied Physics. 28 (3): 362–364. Bibcode:1957JAP....28..362W. doi:10.1063/1.1722747.
