= David Larbalestier =

American scientist

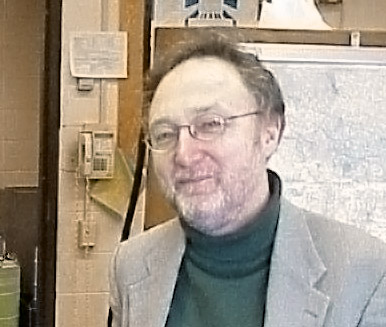
- David C. Larbalestier
- Born: England
- Education: Imperial College London; University of London
- Known for: Materials research for superconductivity applications
- Scientific career
- Fields: Materials Science
- Workplaces: Florida State University
- Doctoral advisor: H.W. King

David C. Larbalestier is an American scientist who has contributed to research in superconducting materials for magnets and power applications. He is currently a Professor of Mechanical Engineering and a member of the Applied Superconductivity Center at the National High Magnetic Field Laboratory at Florida State University, and serves as the Interim Chair of the new Material Science and Engineering Department in the FAMU-FSU College of Engineering. He also holds emeritus status in the Materials Science and Engineering department at the University of Wisconsin–Madison, which was his academic home until 2006.

He was elected a member of the National Academy of Engineering in 2003 for advancing our understanding of the materials science of high-field superconductors and for developing processing techniques that incorporate this knowledge. He is a fellow of the Royal Academy of Engineering.

His materials research interests include improving superconducting properties of many materials, including NbTi, Nb_{3}Sn, MgB_{2}, YBCO, and BSCCO.

== Awards and honors ==
- Fellow of the American Physical Society (1990)
- Member, National Academy of Engineering (2003)
- The International Cryogenics Materials Conference Lifetime Achievement Award (2007)
- Distinguished Alumnus, Imperial College London (2024)
