= Melvin Williams (actor) =

American actor and mobster (1941–2015)

- Born: December 14, 1941; Baltimore, Maryland, U.S.
- Died: December 3, 2015 (aged 73); Baltimore, Maryland, U.S.
- Occupations: Author, Actor, Entrepreneur, Community Activist
- Years active: 1960s–1980s (drug trafficking); 2004–2015 (acting)

Melvin Douglas "Little Melvin" Williams (December 14, 1941 – December 3, 2015) was an American actor, author, entrepreneur, public speaker, educator, community activist, gambler and reformed drug trafficker. Considered a drug kingpin in the 1960s, Williams was known for trafficking heroin in Baltimore before he was sentenced to prison in 1985. After his release he began working as a community activist to help reform the lives of underprivileged minorities and youth. He later appeared as “The Deacon” in the HBO series The Wire and served as an inspiration for the show.

== Early life ==
Williams was born in Baltimore, Maryland. His father worked as a cab driver, while his mother worked as a nurse's assistant.

== Drug trafficking ==
Williams was heavily involved with drug trafficking throughout the 1970s and early 1980s. In the FX documentary Tapping the Wire about the HBO show The Wire, Williams volunteers the information that he made at least "a couple hundred million [dollars]" through heroin trafficking. During that time, Williams was a gambler and states that he was framed by Baltimore police for possession of narcotics. He was periodically arrested on minor charges culminating in federal agents, along with the Baltimore Police Department, launching an investigation into his activities in the early 1980s. One of the Baltimore Police Department investigators working on the case was Ed Burns.

On December 6, 1984, Williams was arrested on cocaine trafficking charges. On February 7, 1985, he was convicted and sentenced to 34 years in prison. He served part of his sentence in the Lewisburg Federal Penitentiary. In May 1987, the Internal Revenue Service assessed taxes in the amount of $425,055. While still in prison, his life story was featured in a series of articles written by future The Wire creator David Simon. "Easy Money: Anatomy of a Drug Empire", a series of five articles, was published in the Baltimore Sun in 1987. During his sentence Melvin became extremely knowledgeable about the law and helped other inmates with their cases. Williams was released on parole in 1996.

In March 1999, he was convicted of a new offense. Williams, who at the time was on parole was sentenced to 22 years in prison in December 2000 after one mistrial. However, he appealed his sentence and it was overturned due to the sentence being outside of the mandatory guidelines. He was released from prison in September 2003.

== Acting career ==
Williams began to appear on the HBO show The Wire during the show's second season. He played the role of the Deacon starting in the third season. The BET show American Gangster profiled Williams in one episode.

In the 1999 film Liberty Heights, the character Little Melvin portrayed by actor Orlando Jones is loosely based upon Williams in the early stages of his career. Other appearances include his cameo in Baltimore hip hop duo Dirt Platoon's video for the song "Pennsylvania Avenue" in 2010.

== Death ==
Williams died on December 3, 2015, at the University of Maryland Medical Center in Baltimore, Maryland. According to acquaintances, he was battling cancer.
