= Eric Edward Fullerton =

Eric Edward Fullerton (born May 7, 1962) from the Aiiso Yufeng Li Family Department of Chemical and Nano Engineering at the University of California, San Diego, was named Fellow of the Institute of Electrical and Electronics Engineers (IEEE) in 2012 "for contributions to the synthesis and characterization of magnetic exchange coupled films, superlattices and recording media".

In 2018, Fullerton was elected a member of the National Academy of Engineering for the invention and development of multilayer high-density magnetic recording media.
