= Bennett Islands =

Island group in Graham Land, Antarctica

- Location within Antarctica Location within Antarctic Peninsula

Geography
- Location: Antarctica
- Coordinates: 66°56′S 67°40′W

Administration
- Administered under the Antarctic Treaty System

Demographics
- Population: Uninhabited

The Bennett Islands are a group of islands at the southwest side of Liard Island in Hanusse Bay, extending in a southwest direction for 10 km (6 mi) off the west coast of Graham Land. The islands were sighted and sketched from the air in February 1937 by the British Graham Land Expedition under John Rymill. They were named in 1954 by the UK Antarctic Place-Names Committee for Arthur G. Bennett, British representative on whaling in the South Shetland Islands and South Orkney Islands for many years between 1913 and 1927, and acting government naturalist in the Falkland Islands, 1924–38.

== See also ==
- List of Antarctic and sub-Antarctic islands
