= List of honorary doctors of the Norwegian University of Science and Technology =

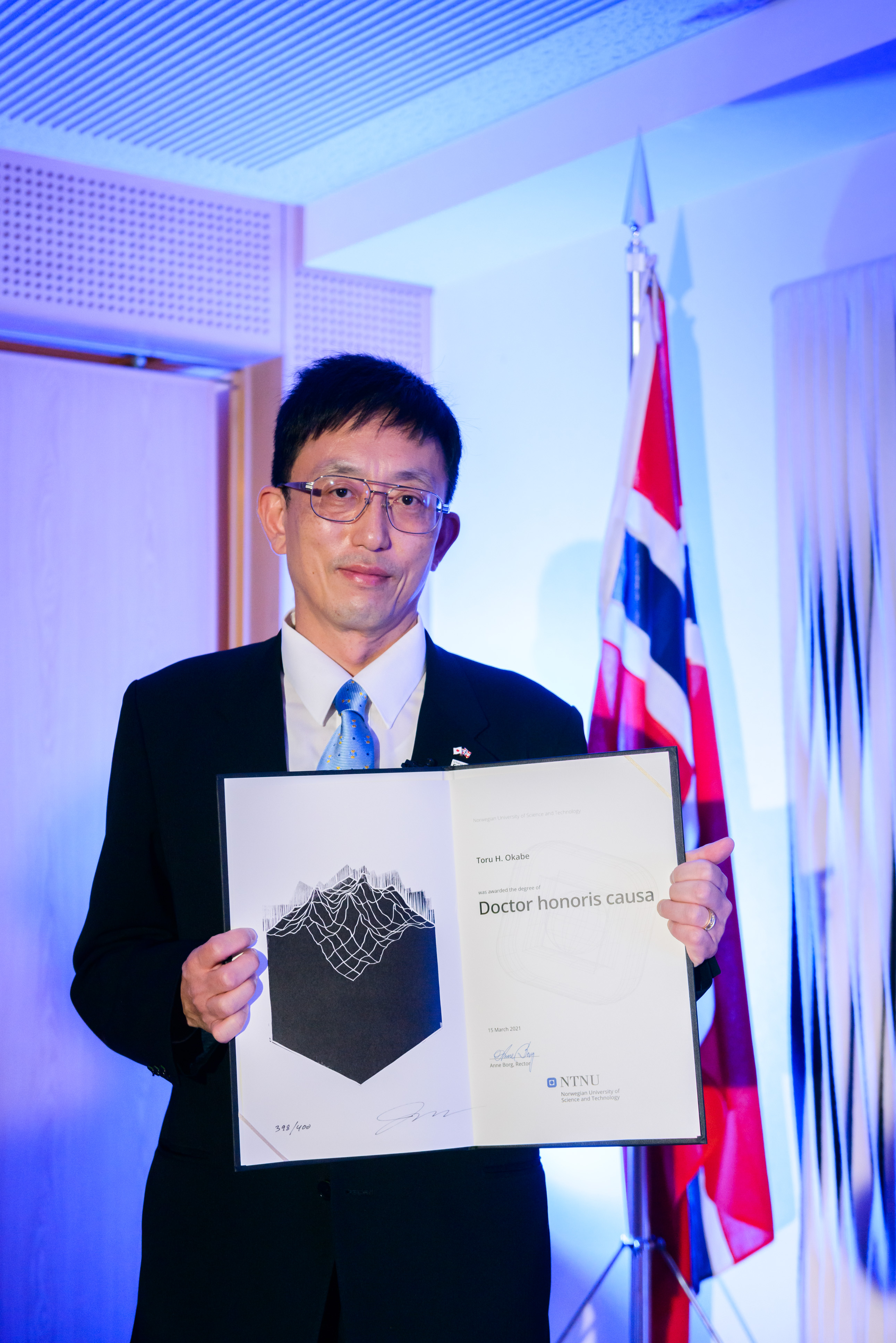
Toru H. Okabe with diploma in 2021

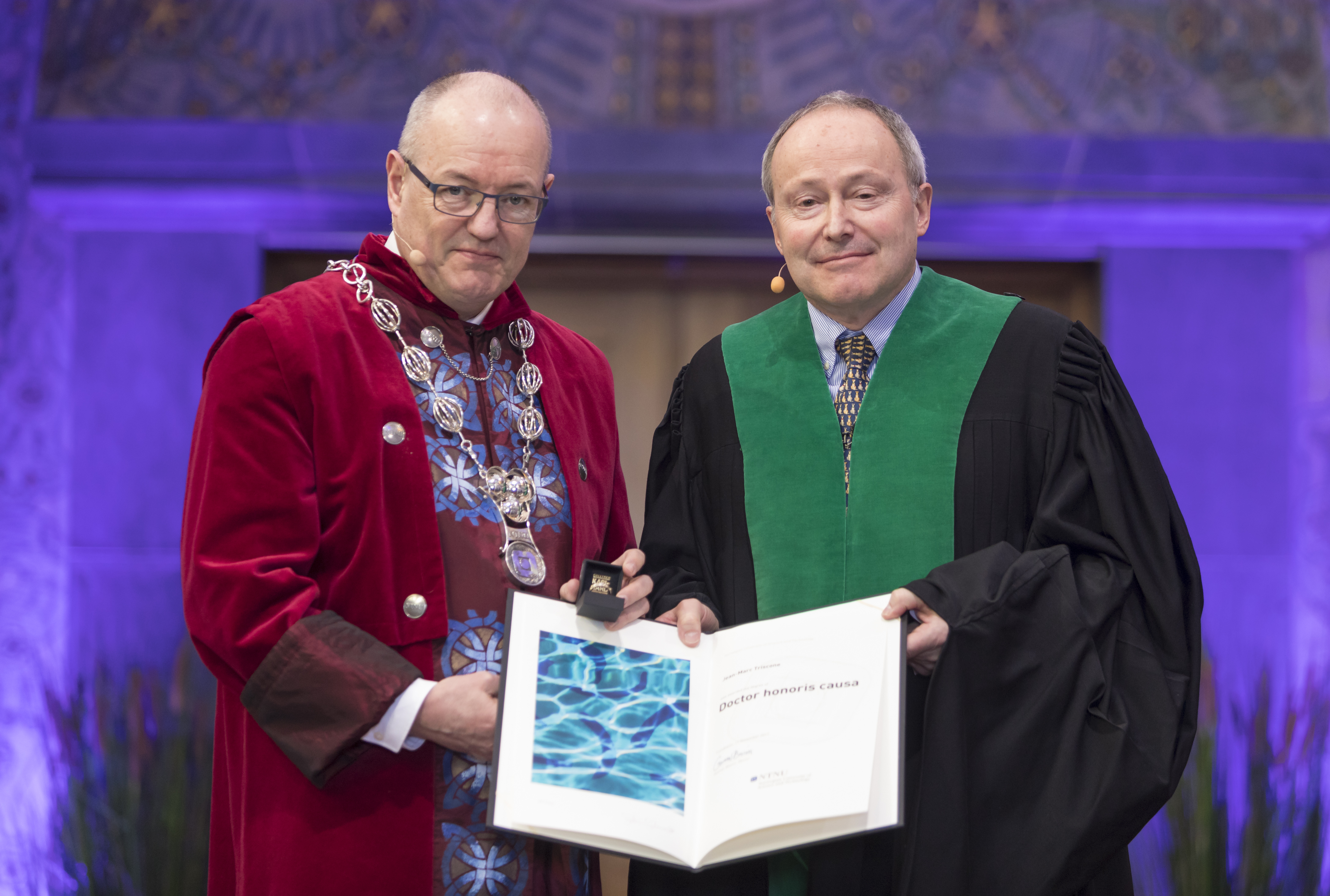
Jean-Marc Triscone (right) and Gunnar Bovim, rector of NTNU

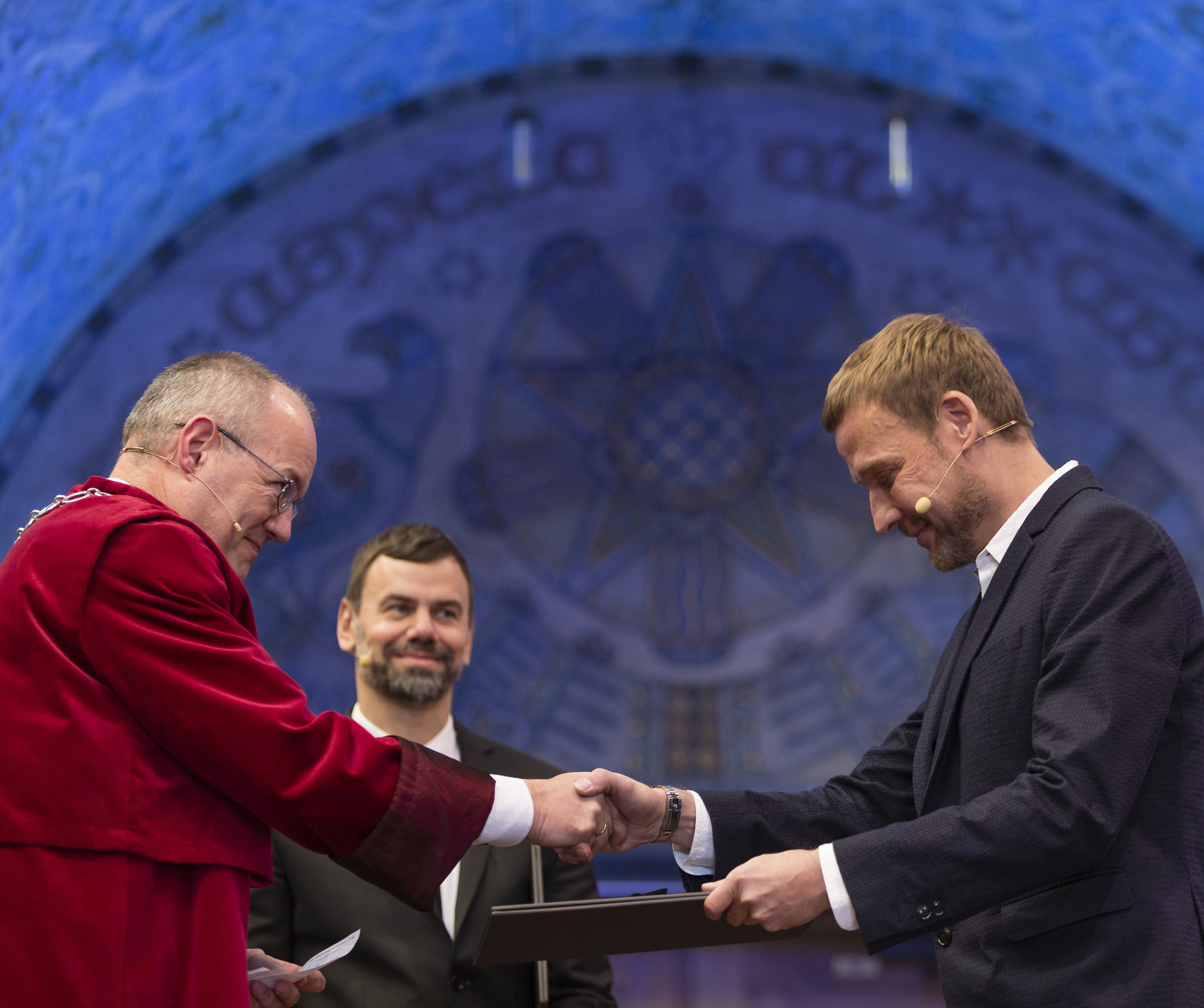
The artists Elmgreen & Dragset receiving their diplomas as honorary doctors of NTNU in 2015. Rector Gunnar Bovim to the left.

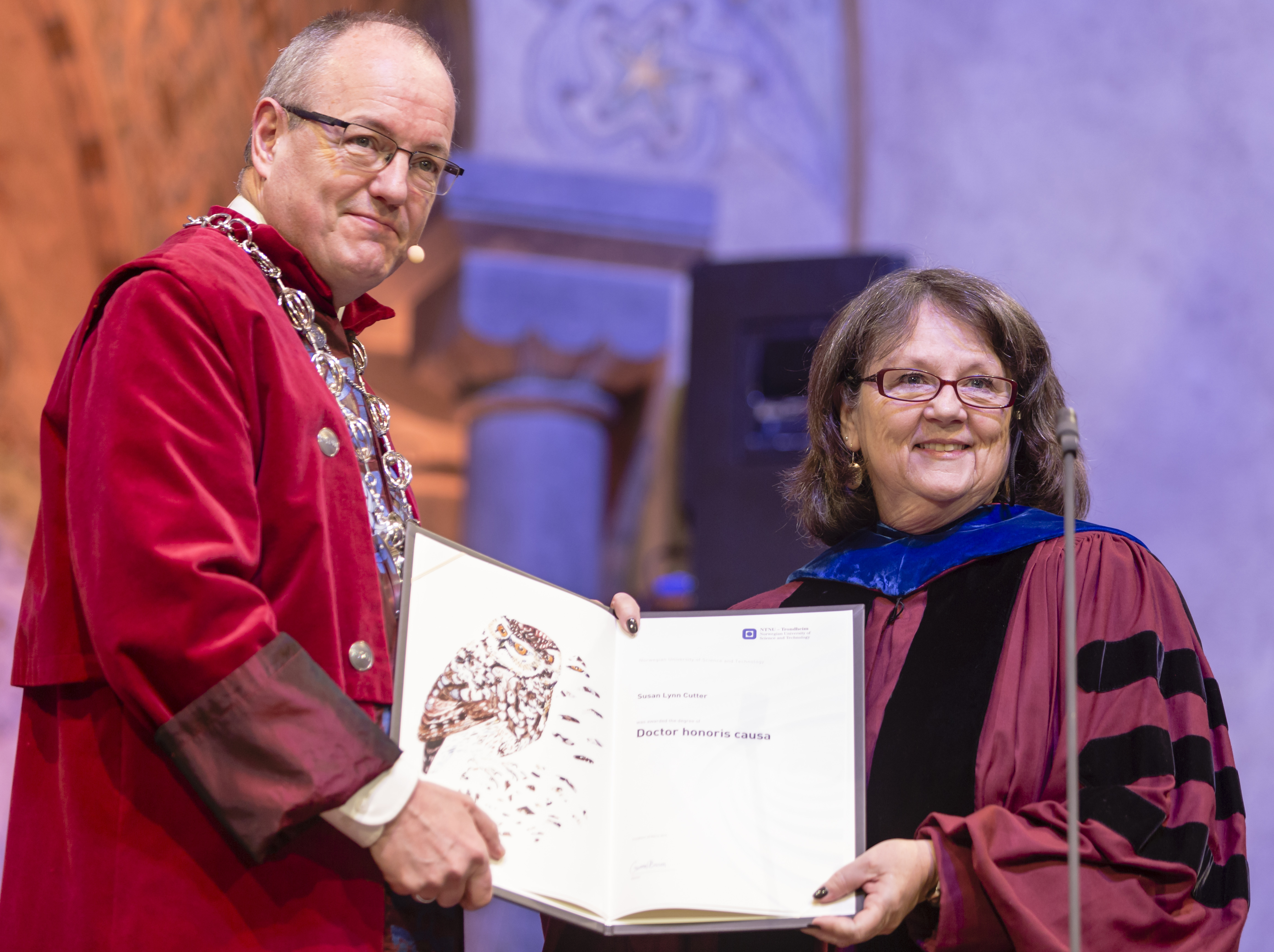
Susan L. Cutter with her diploma in 2015. Rector Bovim to the left.

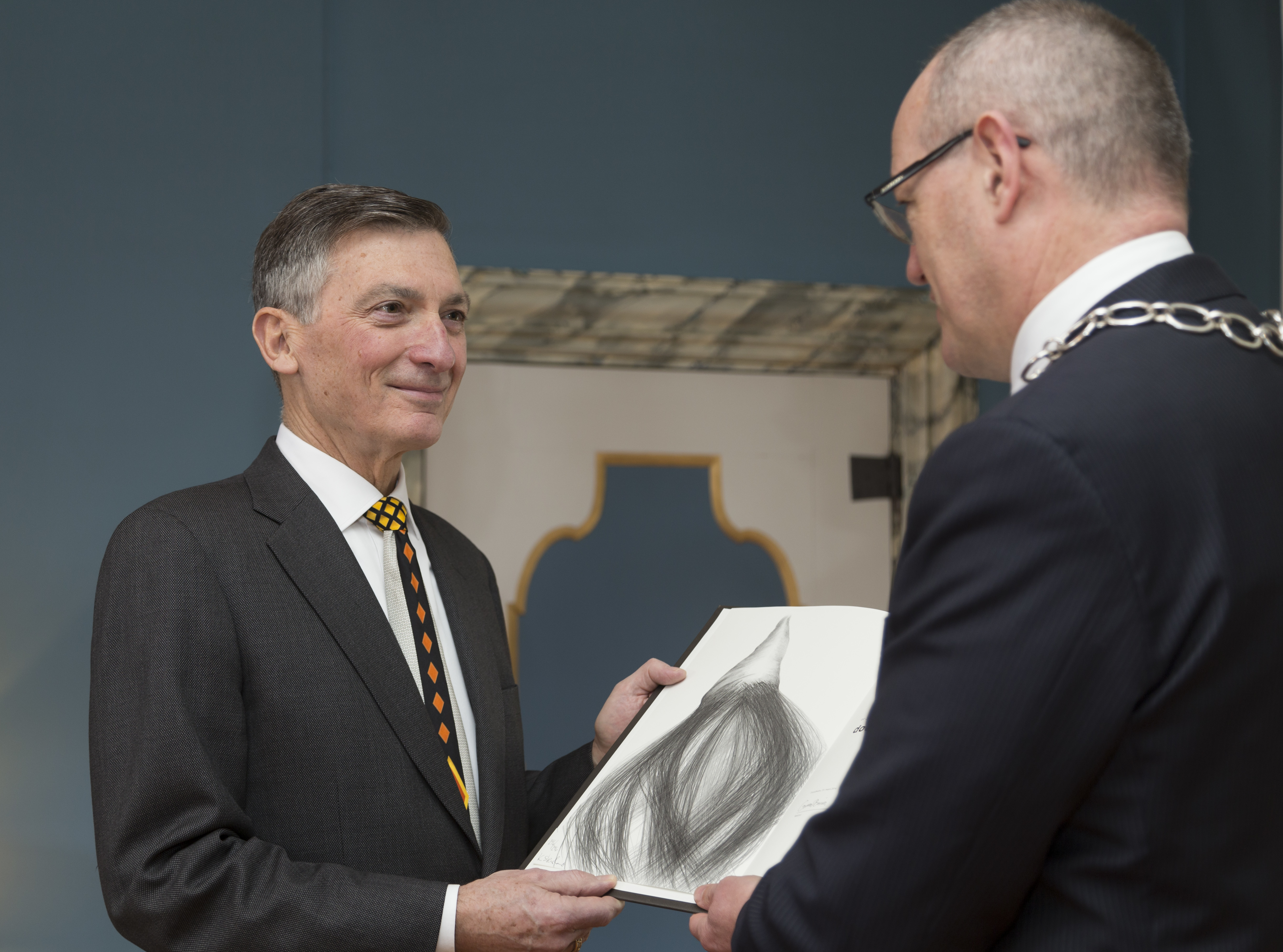
Donald Sadoway receiving his diploma in 2014. Rector Bovim to the right.

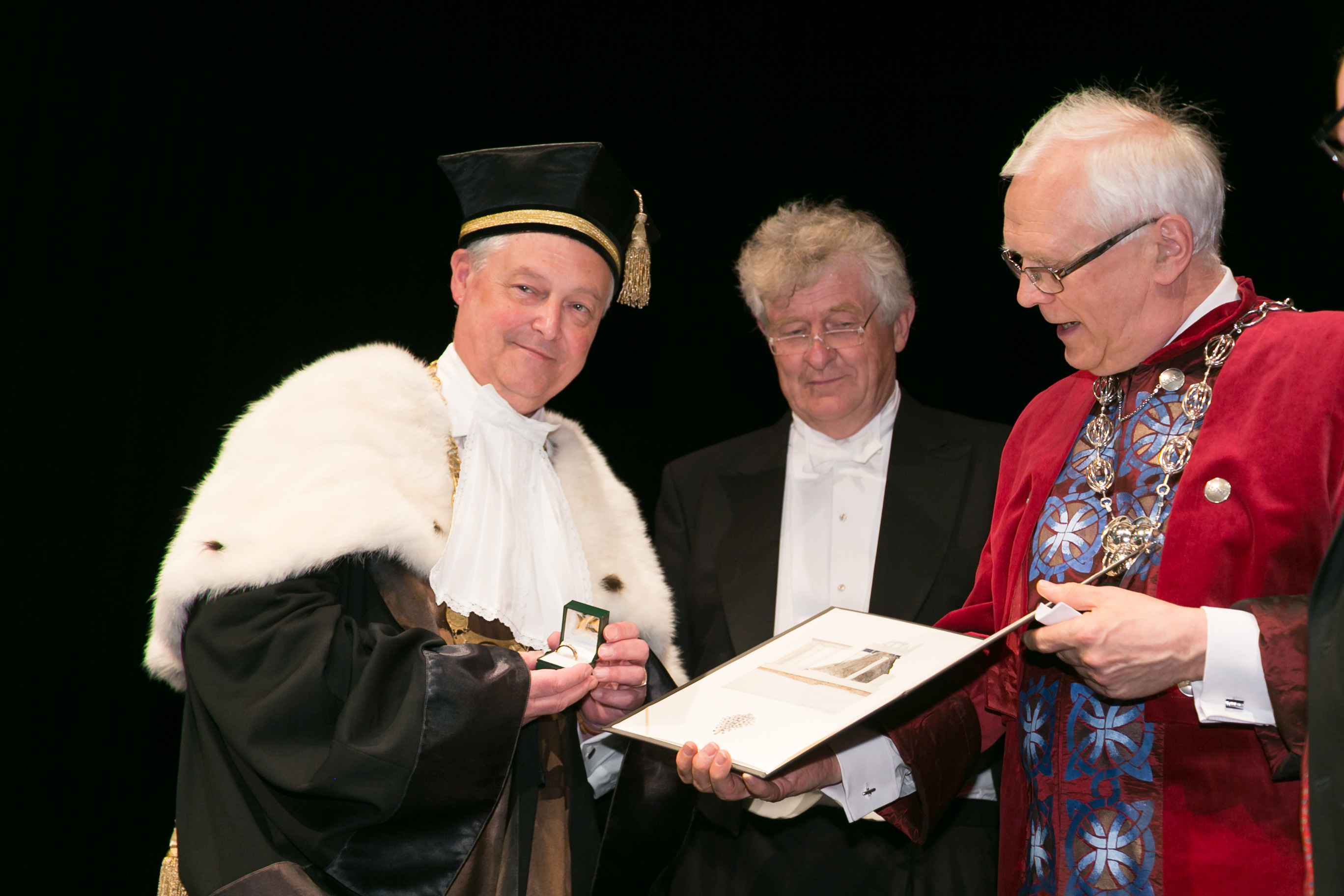
Left to right: Sergio Paoletti with his ring and diploma, Master of Ceremony Truls Gjestland, rector Torbjørn Digernes (2013)

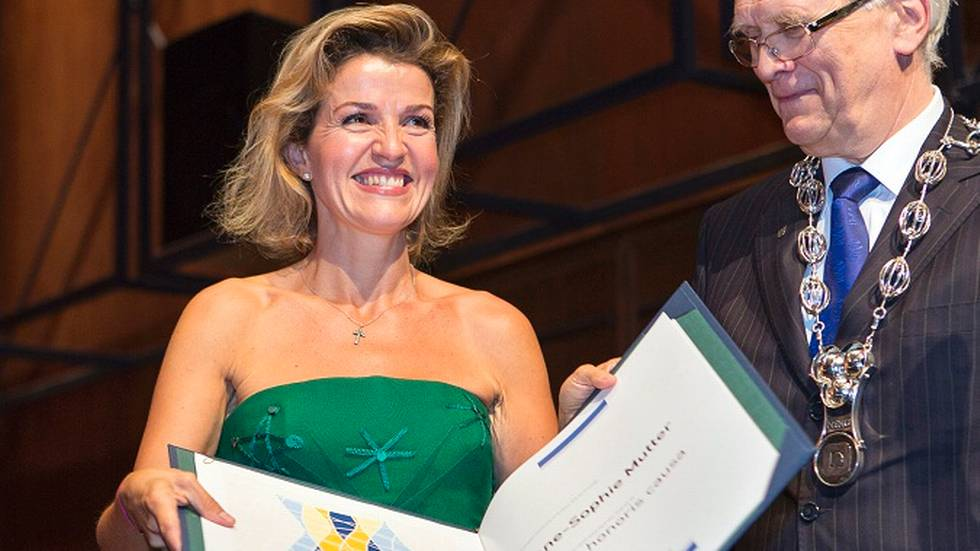
Doctor honoris causa Anne-Sophie Mutter receiving her diploma. Rector Digernes to the right.

This list of honorary doctors of the Norwegian University of Science and Technology (NTNU) shows recipients of honorary doctorates bestowed by NTNU and its precursors, the Norwegian Institute of Technology (NTH) (1910–1967) and the University of Trondheim (UNiT) (1968–1996). The first honorary doctorates, at NTH, were granted in 1935.

2025

- Maria Viklander, Sweden
- Timothy J. Steiner, United Kingdom

2024

- Christopher J.L. Murray, United States
- Emmanuela Gakidou, United States
- Richard Spontak, United States

2023

- Carla J. Shatz, United States
- Roland Span, Germany
- Trond Petersen, United States

2022

- Patricia Lago, Italy
- Dierk Raabe, Germany
- Stephen Harrison, United Kingdom

2021

- James A. Robinson, United Kingdom
- Toru H. Okabe, Japan
- Gilbert Laporte, Canada
- Paul D.N. Hebert, Canada

2020 - postponed due to the COVID-19 pandemic

2019

- Vishantie Sewpaul, South Africa

2018

- Jean-Marc Triscone, Italy
- James E. Young, United States

2017

- Charis Thompson, United States
- Kristina Edström, Sweden
- Robert Jackson, Great Britain and Sweden (visiting professor)

2016

- Artemis Alexiadou, Greece
- Ottoline Leyser, Great Britain
- Michael Marmot, Great Britain
- Miguel Rubi, Spain

2015

- Elmgreen & Dragset, Denmark & Norway
- Susan L. Cutter, United States
- Bruce Beutler, United States

2014

- Suresh Raj Sharma, Nepal
- Donald Sadoway, United States

2013

- Sergio Paoletti, Italy

2012

- Donald Glenn Byrne, Australia
- Jens Norskov, Denmark

2011

- Eric Kandel, United States
- Kjetil Trædal Thorsen, Norway

2010

- Chick Corea, United States
- Ingrid Daubechies, United States
- Ilkka Hanski, Finland
- Anne-Sophie Mutter, Germany
- Preben Terndrup Pedersen, Denmark

2009

- Piers Blaikie, United States
- Thomas J.R. Hughes, United States

2008

- Fred Kavli, United States
- Elinor Ostrom, United States

2007

- David Embury, Canada

2006

- Liv Ullmann, Norway
- Hans Mooij, Netherlands

2005

- Chris Jenks, Great Britain

2004

- Elizabeth Barrett-Connor, United States
- Claus Michael Ringel, Germany

2003

- Carmen Andrade, Spania
- Jon Elster, Norway

2002

- Suzanne Lacasse, United States
- Toril Moi, Norway
- Yuki Ueda, Japan

2001

- Joseph V. Bonventre, United States
- David Hendry, Great Britain
- Hiroyuki Yoshikawa, Japan

2000

- David Mumford, United States

1998

- Thomas Luckmann, United States

1997

- Liv Hatle, Norway
- Frederick William Gehring, United States
- Torsten Hägerstrand, Sweden
- Karl Stenstadvold, Norway
- Jürgen Warnatz, Germany

1996

- Raymond Ian Page, Great Britain
- Arve Tellefsen, Norway

1995

- Helmer Dahl, Norway

1994

- Robert Glaser, United States
- Mats Hillert, Sweden

1993

- Vigdís Finnbogadóttir, Iceland
- Knut Schmidt-Nielsen, United States
- Marshall B. Stranding, United States
- Ernst H. Beutner, United States

1992

- Walter Eversheim, Germany
- K. Alex Müller
- Nick Newman, United States
- Kenneth W. Hedberg
- Robert Ader

1985

- Ivar Giæver, Norway
- Edwin N. Lightfoot, Jr., United States
- Olgierd Zienkiewicz, Spain

1982

- James William Fulbright, United States
- James Hamilton, Denmark
- Lars von Haartman, Finland
- John W. Kanwisher, United States
- Lars Y. Terenius, Sweden
- Gunnar Kullerud, United States
- Olof E. H. Rydbeck, Sweden
- Ray William Clough, United States

1976

- Theodore Theodorsen, United States

1972

- John H. Argyris, Germany
- Aage Bohr, Denmark
- Matts Bäckstrøm, Sweden
- Cornelis Jacobus Gorter, Netherlands
- Knud Grue-Sørensen, Denmark
- Einar Ingvald Haugen, United States
- Lipke Bijdeley Holthuis, Netherlands
- Knud Winstrup Johansen, Denmark
- Ralph Kronig, Netherlands
- Atle Selberg, United States

1960

- Alvar Aalto, Finland
- Anker Engelund, Denmark
- Ragnar Lundholm, Sweden
- Lars Onsager, United States
- Paul Scherrer, Switzerland
- Frank Whittle, Great Britain
- Ragnar Woxén, Sweden

1935

- Ragnar Liljeblad, Sweden
- Ludwig Prandtl, Germany
- Raymond Unwin, United States
