= Dierk Raabe =

German materials scientist (born 1965)

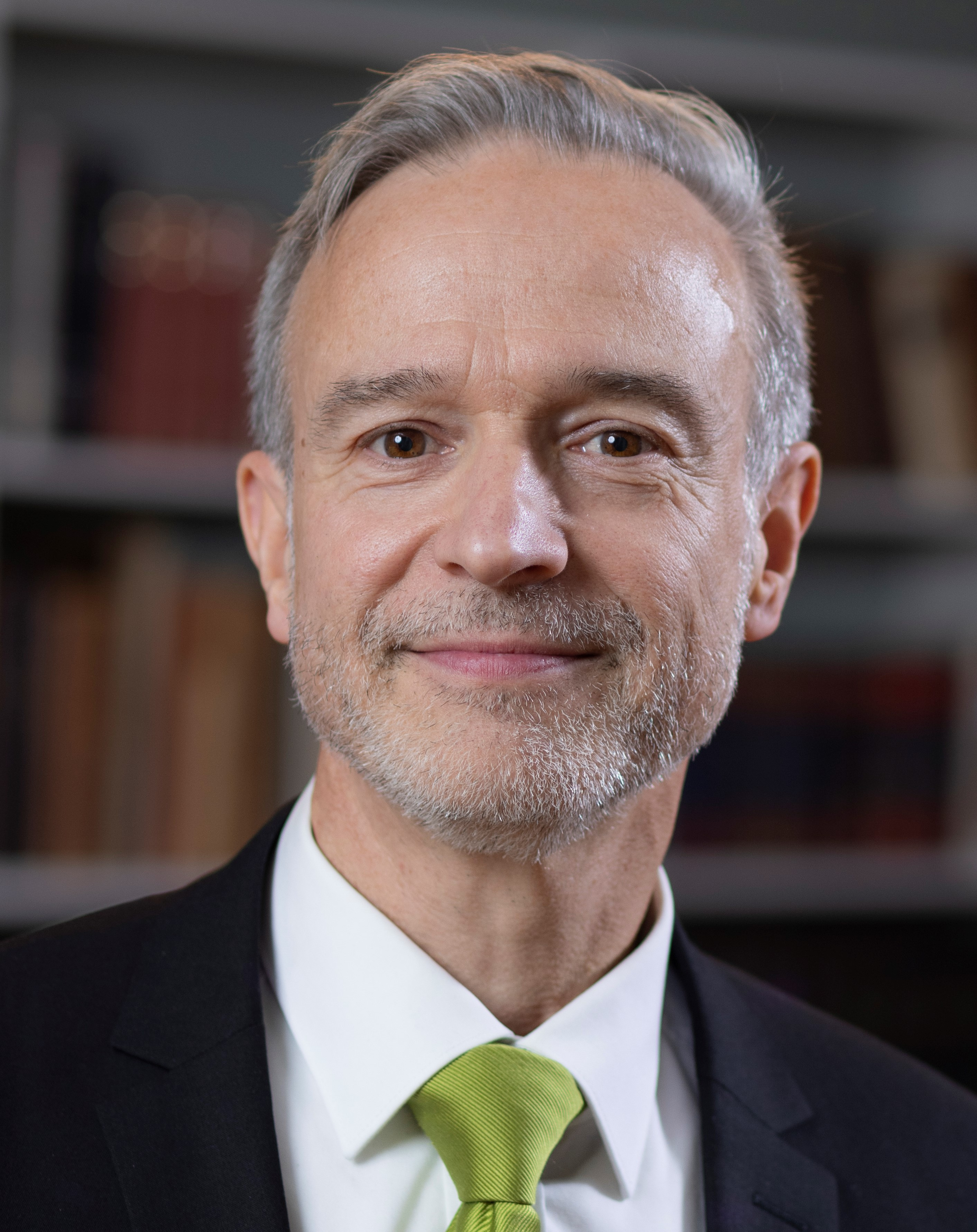
- Raabe in Trondheim, 2022, on the occasion of receiving his honorary doctorate at NTNU
- Born: 18 April 1965 (age 61); Hilden, West Germany
- Education: RWTH Aachen University
- Awards: Leibniz Prize (2004); Henry Marion Howe Medal, ASM (2016); Gold Medal, Acta Materialia (2022); Honorary Doctorate, NTNU (2022)
- Scientific career
- Fields: Computational materials science; Microstructural characterisation; Micromechanics; Materials processing
- Workplaces: RWTH Aachen; Max Planck Institute for Iron Research
- Thesis: (1992)
- Doctoral advisor: Kurt Lücke
- Website: dierk-raabe.com

Dierk Raabe (born 18 April 1965) is a German materials scientist and researcher, who has contributed significantly to the field of materials science. He is a professor at RWTH Aachen University and director of the Max Planck Institute for Sustainable Materials, Düsseldorf in Düsseldorf. He is the recipient of the 2004 Leibniz Prize, and the 2022 Acta Materialia's Gold Medal. He also received the honorary doctorate of the Norwegian University of Science and Technology. As of March 2023, he is the most cited computational materials scientist and physical metallurgist, with a H-index of 155.

== Life and career ==
=== Early life and education ===
Dierk Raabe was born on 18 April 1965 in Hilden, North Rhine-Westphalia, West Germany. Raabe initially studied music for four semesters (1983–1984) at the Conservatory Rheinland. However, in 1984, he switched to Physical Metallurgy and Metal Physics at RWTH Aachen University. He received his diploma in 1990, his doctorate in 1992, and his habilitation in 1997.

=== Career ===
Between his dissertation and habilitation, Raabe worked as a research assistant and group leader for computer simulation and composites at the Institute for Metallurgy and Metal Physics in Aachen. A Heisenberg grant from the German Research Foundation enabled Raabe to study and research in Carnegie-Mellon University and the National High Magnetic Field Laboratory, in the United States from 1997 to 1999.

Since 1999, Raabe has been the Director of the Department of Microstructure Physics and Alloy Design at RWTH Aachen University, and, since 2010, he has been the Chairman of the Management Board of the Max Planck Institute for Iron Research in Düsseldorf. At the same time, he teaches master courses on Computational Materials Science, Microstructure Mechanics and Sustainable Materials at RWTH Aachen University, and supervise PhD students.

== Research ==
Raabe's research activities are focused on advancing the field of materials science by developing new materials, characterising their properties, and optimising their processing techniques for various applications. Some of Raabe's research activities include:

- New materials: Raabe's team is involved in the development of new materials with unique properties that can be used in various applications. This includes the study of steels, high-entropy alloys, high-field magnets, and advanced aerospace alloys.
- Microstructure characterisation: Raabe's research also focuses on the characterisation of materials at the microstructure level. This involves the use of advanced microscopy techniques to study the structure and properties of materials at the nanoscale.
- Materials modeling: Raabe's team also uses computational modeling to predict the behaviour of materials under different conditions. This helps to guide the design of new materials and improve the performance of existing ones.
- Materials processing: Raabe's research also involves the development of new processing techniques for materials. This includes the study of advanced manufacturing processes and the optimisation of existing ones to improve the quality and properties of materials. Much of his recent work also addresses the question of how new alloys with multi-functional properties can be sustainable, with a focus on green steel.

In 2012, Raabe received a European Research Council (ERC) advanced grant, the most significant individual research grant in Europe. In 2022, he received another € 2.5 million Advanced Grant for his project Reducing Iron Oxides without Carbon by using Hydrogen-Plasma (ROC). The ROC project intends to make the production of steel greener by reducing CO_{2} emissions. This is an essential goal, since the manufacture of metallic materials is one of the largest single sources of greenhouse gases.

Raabe's research is highly cited and featured in high-impact journals including Nature, Nature Materials, and Nature Communications.

== Awards and honours ==
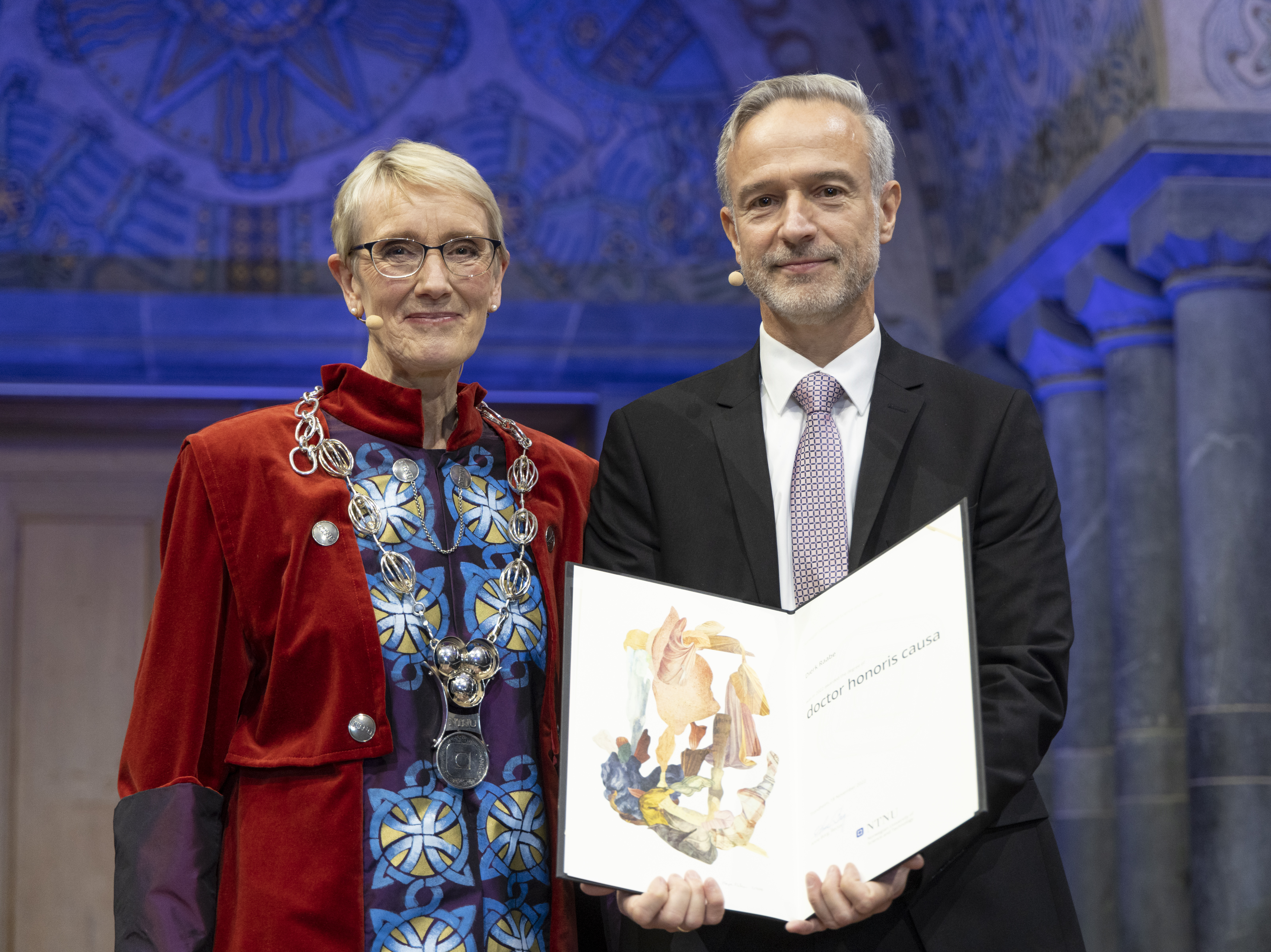
Raabe (right) receiving an honorary doctorate from the Norwegian University of Science and Technology in 2022

Raabe received Borchers Award and Friedrich-Wilhelm Award from RWTH Aachen University, Adolf Martens Award from the Federal Institute for Materials Research and Testing, FEMS Materials Science & Technology Prize in 2001, Leibniz Prize in 2004, Lee Hsun Lecture Award from the Chinese Academy of Sciences in 2009, Weinberg Lecture Award from the University of British Columbia in 2011, Werner Koester Prize in 2015, ASM's Henry Marion Howe Medal in 2016, KAIST's Lecture Series Award in 2019, Imperial College London's Bauerman Lecture Award in 2019, and Acta Materialia's Gold Medal award in 2022.

Raabe has been a full member of the North Rhine-Westphalian Academy of Sciences, Humanities and the Arts since 2008, the German National Academy of Sciences Leopoldina since 2013, and the German Academy of Science and Engineering (Acatech) since 2016. He is the vice senator of the German National Academy of Sciences Leopoldina. He was a member of the Alexander von Humboldt Foundation's selection board (2007–2016), Acta Materialia's governor board (2007–2014), and the German Science and Humanities Council (2010–2016) and was the Chairman of the Board of Governors of RWTH Aachen University (2012–2017).

In 2014, he was appointed honorary professor at the Katholieke Universiteit Leuven Kulak. In 2022, he received an honorary doctorate from the Norwegian University of Science and Technology (NTNU). In 2025, he was selected a member of the US National Academy of Engineering.

== Books ==
- Raabe, Dierk (1998). Computational Materials Science. Wiley VCH. ISBN 1-280-56067-3. OCLC 824553909.
- Raabe, Dierk (2001). Morde, Macht, Moneten: Metalle zwischen Mythos und High-Tech [Murder, Power, Money: Metals Between Myth and High-tech] (in German). Weinheim: Wiley. ISBN 978-3-527-30419-6. OCLC 237544644.
- Raabe, Dierk; Roters, Franz; Barlat, Frédéric; Chen, Long-Qing (6 March 2006). Continuum Scale Simulation of Engineering Materials: Fundamentals - Microstructures - Process Applications. John Wiley & Sons. ISBN 978-3-527-60421-0.
- Janssens, Koenraad George Frans; Raabe, Dierk; Kozeschnik, Ernest; Miodownik, Mark A.; Nestler, Britta (26 July 2010). Computational Materials Engineering: An Introduction to Microstructure Evolution. Academic Press. ISBN 978-0-08-055549-2.
- Roters, Franz; Eisenlohr, Philip; Bieler, Thomas R.; Raabe, Dierk (4 August 2011). Crystal Plasticity Finite Element Methods: in Materials Science and Engineering. John Wiley & Sons. ISBN 978-3-527-64209-0.
