= Torsten Hägerstrand =

Swedish geographer (1916–2004)

- Hägerstrand in 1991
- Born: October 11, 1916; Moheda, Sweden
- Died: May 4, 2004 (aged 87); Lund, Sweden
- Citizenship: Sweden
- Education: Lund University
- Known for: Time geography Human migration Cultural diffusion
- Awards: Lauréat Prix International de Géographie Vautrin Lud; Outstanding Achievement Award from the Association of American Geographers; Victoria Medal (1979)
- Scientific career
- Fields: Geography
- Workplaces: Lund University

Torsten Stig Erik Hägerstrand (October 11, 1916, in Moheda – May 3, 2004, in Lund) was a Swedish geographer. He is known for his work on migration, cultural diffusion and time geography.

A native and resident of Sweden, Hägerstrand was a professor (later professor emeritus) of geography at Lund University, where he received his doctorate in 1953. His doctoral research was on cultural diffusion. His research has helped to make Sweden, and particularly Lund, a major center of innovative work in cultural geography. He also influenced the practice of spatial planning in Sweden through his students.

== Early life ==
Hägerstrand's father was a teacher at a remote elementary school and the family lived at the school. Hägerstrand recalled that his early education was based on the pedagogical ideas of Swiss educator Johann Pestalozzi. Several of Hägerstrand's students speculated that his holistic and visionary thinking was rooted in his early education:

He was taught local geography, history and folklore at home in the Pestalozzi tradition which was being introduced at that time. Cartography, geology, botany and agronomy were all interrelated parts of a more holistic understanding of processes within a spatial area. To start with, children learned about their immediate environment (e.g., the school room and the farm), then about the village, and gradually the whole district. As a pupil of Hägerstrand, it is easy for me to recognize parts of this tradition which later became what we today would refer to as an 'integrative perspective'.

== Academic career ==
Hägerstrand entered Lund University in 1937. His 1953 doctoral thesis Innovation Diffusion as a Spatial Process gained fame for its innovative use of Monte Carlo simulation of demographic development. It showed how dynamic, incremental simulation of spatial processes could be used at the spatial scale of the individual as well as large spatial aggregates. Forty years later, geographer Andrew Cliff remarked on the foresight of Hägerstrand's methodology: "Bearing in mind that much of the research upon which the book is based dates from a time when computers were almost nonexistent, let alone used by geographers, it is remarkable that the simulation methodology which is so critically dependent upon computing power should have been contemplated."

Hägerstrand's research was aided by developments at Lund University, notably the establishment of the Siffermaskinen i Lund (SMIL), one of Sweden's first computers. Hägerstrand noted that the Swedish computer scientist Carl-Erik Fröberg, who had been Hägerstrand's "school-mate since secondary school", had introduced him to the Monte Carlo method that would define his doctoral thesis, following a trip by Fröberg and other young Swedish scientists to the United States, a trip that was financed by the Swedish government's project to build its own computer.

In 1969, he presented a paper titled "What about People in Regional Science?" to the European Congress of the Regional Science Association in Copenhagen, Denmark. This paper, published in 1970, developed two concepts:

- The need to study the individual in order to understand social and group practices. Modern cultural geographers commonly now study everyday practices on an individualistic basis, in order to understand larger scale patterns. The study of just groups creates a homogenization of reality and hides the truth.
- A link between space and time that had previously been poorly developed. Historically, social scientists had treated time as a relevant but external factor to spatial features. Hägerstrand's early work on innovation diffusion (studying the geographical spread of new technologies) made him realise that the two, though separate, were not independent of each other; they have what French theorist Henri Lefebvre would call a dialectical relationship.

== Legacy ==
Hägerstrand's initial work was primarily quantitative, which is important as the discipline of geography was, when he published his first paper in 1942, a highly descriptive subject. In the 1950s he was a pioneer of geocoding statistical primary data. He developed models and statistical techniques, such as the time–space cube and time–space prism, which later became important in the development of geographic information systems that process and visualize movement data. His work informed the likes of Allan Pred and Nigel Thrift, who helped take it to the English speaking world.

Hägerstrand's work contributed to the introduction of humanistic thought into geography, which led to the development of critical geography. While his early work was largely quantitative, Hägerstrand's later work paid closer attention to notions of embodiment and emotion. Still, his methods were critiqued by feminist geographer Gillian Rose, who claimed that his models showed a masculine and falsely-ordered view of the world. More recent geographers have tried to combine time geography with the qualitative research and affective phenomenology of feminist geography.

Development of Hägerstrand's work has continued to form part of the basis for non-representational theory, and a reappraisal of his work by new generations of social scientists and biologists means that he remains an influential thinker today. In 2005, Nigel Thrift summarized five benefits of Hägerstrand's time geography for contemporary social science:

First, it provides a sense of concreteness, of the power of 'thereness', and it does so in a way—visually—that is still the preserve of too few social theorists. All those intricate diagrams were, in part, an attempt to describe the pragmatics of events, a theme which has now, in the work of writers like Deleuze, become fashionable in the social sciences and humanities but, at the time at which Hägerstrand was working, tended to be restricted to the field of philosophy, except for the work of social interactionists and ethnomethodologists which was often very imperfectly understood by other than a relatively small coterie of enthusiasts. Secondly, Hägerstrand's work was an attack on the Durkheimian idea that space and time were social categories, collective representations which both derived from society and also dictated to society. [...] Time-geography makes it possible to go beyond social constructionism by emphasizing the physical constraints on human action and the wider networks of competing opportunities that they set up which act to steer situations. [...] Thirdly, and as a directly related point, those time-geographic diagrams did something else too. They radically lessened the distinction between humans and other objects. They provided a kind of neutrality of representation, even a democracy of description, of the world. [...] Fourthly, Hägerstrand's work espoused a geographical ethics, centred on the wise use of space and time. Although Hägerstrand would often use economic metaphors to describe that wisdom in the use of space and time, I am sure that he meant something broader and more encompassing which it seems to me to be well worth keeping hold of, a kind of democratic ethos of the cardinal dimensions, a conviviality in the use of space and time. Fifthly, Hägerstrand provided a language which could register the world in different ways. Perhaps one way of looking at Hägerstrand's work is as a means of saying 'hello' in a language many can understand: drawing as a kind of visual Esperanto.

== Honors ==
He received honorary doctorates from University of Bergen, Norwegian school of economics and business administration, Norwegian University of Science and Technology, University of Bristol, University of Edinburgh, University of Glasgow and Ohio State University. The commendation accompanying the honorary degree at Ohio State University noted that "his work on innovation diffusion, carried out in the 1950s and 1960s, continues to be cited as a standard against which current research is measured" and that "this distinguished individual...inspired a generation of scholars around the world."

He was a member of the Royal Swedish Academy of Sciences, the Royal Swedish Academy of Letters, the Royal Swedish Academy of Engineering Sciences, the Norwegian Academy of Science and Letters, the Finnish Academy of Sciences, the American Academy of Arts and Sciences, a Corresponding Fellow of the British Academy, and a member of Société de Géographie in France. He was also one of the founding members of Academia Europaea.

In 1968 Professor Hägerstrand was awarded the Charles P. Daly Medal of the American Geographical Society and in 1968 received an Outstanding Achievement Award from the Association of American Geographers. In 1979 he received the Victoria Medal from the Royal Geographical Society.

In 1992 Torsten Hägerstrand was awarded Lauréat Prix International de Géographie Vautrin Lud, the highest award in the geography research field.

== Key publications ==
- Hägerstrand, Torsten (1952). The propagation of innovation waves. Lund studies in geography: Series B, Human geography, 4. Lund: Royal University of Lund, Dept. of Geography. OCLC 254752.
- Hägerstrand, Torsten (1955). "Statistiska primäruppgifter, flygkartering och "data processing"-maskiner: ett kombineringsprojekt". Svensk Geografisk Årsbok (in Swedish) (31): 233–255.
- Hannerberg, David; Hägerstrand, Torsten, eds. (1957). Migration in Sweden: a symposium. Lund studies in geography: Series B, Human geography, 13. Lund: CWK Gleerup. OCLC 170619.
- Hägerstrand, Torsten (1967a) [1953]. Innovation diffusion as a spatial process [Innovationsförloppet ur korologisk synpunkt]. Translated by Allan Pred; Greta Haag. Chicago: University of Chicago Press. OCLC 536383.
- Hägerstrand, Torsten (1967b). "The computer and the geographer". Transactions of the Institute of British Geographers (42): 1–19. doi:10.2307/621369. JSTOR 621369. S2CID 147121939.
- Hägerstrand, Torsten (1970). "What about people in regional science?". Papers of the Regional Science Association. 24 (1): 6–21. Bibcode:1970PRegS..24....6H. doi:10.1007/BF01936872. S2CID 198174673.
- Hägerstrand, Torsten (1973). On the definition of migration. Rapporter och notiser, 9. Lund: Lunds universitets kulturgeografiska institution. OCLC 185647319.
- Hägerstrand, Torsten (1973). "The domain of human geography". In Chorley, Richard J (ed.). Directions in geography. London: Methuen. pp. 67–87. ISBN 978-0-416-60830-4. OCLC 789168.
- Hägerstrand, Torsten (1974). "Ecology under one perspective". In Bylund, Erik; Linderholm, Håkan; Rune, Olof (eds.). Ecological problems of the circumpolar area: papers from the international symposium at Luleå, Sweden, June 28–29, 1971. Luleå: Norrbottens Museum. pp. 271–276. OCLC 3035384.
- Hägerstrand, Torsten (1974). The impact of transport on the quality of life. Rapporter och notiser, 13. Lund: Lunds universitets kulturgeografiska institution. OCLC 185647393.
- Hägerstrand, Torsten (1975). "Space, time and human conditions". In Karlqvist, Anders; Lundqvist, Lars; Snickars, Folke (eds.). Dynamic allocation of urban space. Lexington, MA: Lexington Books. pp. 3–14. ISBN 978-0-347-01052-8. OCLC 1364735.
- Hägerstrand, Torsten (1976). "Geography and the study of interaction between nature and society". Geoforum. 7 (5–6): 329–334. doi:10.1016/0016-7185(76)90063-4.
- Hägerstrand, Torsten (1978). "Survival and arena: on the life-history of individuals in relation to their geographical environment". In Carlstein, Tommy; Parkes, Don; Thrift, Nigel J (eds.). Human activity and time geography. Timing space and spacing time. Vol. 2. New York: Wiley. pp. 122–143. ISBN 978-0-7131-5989-9. OCLC 4935024.
- Buttimer, Anne; Hägerstrand, Torsten (1980). Invitation to dialogue: a progress report. DIA paper, 1. Lund: University of Lund. OCLC 8534714.
- Hägerstrand, Torsten (1982). "Diorama, path and project". Tijdschrift voor economische en sociale geografie. 73 (6): 323–339. doi:10.1111/j.1467-9663.1982.tb01647.x.
- Hägerstrand, Torsten (1983). "In search for the sources of concepts". In Buttimer, Anne (ed.). The practice of geography. London; New York: Longman. pp. 238–256. ISBN 978-0-582-30087-3. OCLC 8629687.
- Hägerstrand, Torsten, ed. (1985). The identification of progress in learning. Cambridge: Cambridge University Press. ISBN 978-0-521-30087-2. OCLC 10924966.
- Hägerstrand, Torsten (1985). "Time geography: focus on the corporeality of man, society and environment". In Aida, Shūhei (ed.). The science and praxis of complexity: contributions to the symposium held at Montpellier, France, 9–11 May, 1984. Tokyo: United Nations University Press. pp. 193–216. ISBN 978-92-808-0560-4. OCLC 13025296.
- Hägerstrand, Torsten (1991). Gösta Carlestam; Barbro Sollbe (eds.). Om tidens vidd och tingens ordning (in Swedish). Stockholm: Byggforskningsrådet. ISBN 978-91-540-5363-6. OCLC 29548202.
- Hägerstrand, Torsten (1992). "The global and the local". In Svedin, Uno; Aniansson, Britt Hägerhäll (eds.). Society and the environment: a Swedish research perspective. Ecology, economy & environment, 2. Dordrecht; Boston: Kluwer Academic Publishers. pp. 13–21. ISBN 978-0-7923-1796-8. OCLC 25788428.
- Hägerstrand, Torsten (1995). "Action in the physical everyday world". In Haggett, Peter; Cliff, Andrew (eds.). Diffusing geography: essays for Peter Haggett. The Institute of British Geographers special publications series, 31. Oxford; Cambridge, MA: Blackwell. pp. 35–45. ISBN 978-0-631-19534-4. OCLC 30895028.
- Hägerstrand, Torsten (2001) [1995]. "A look at the political geography of environmental management". In Buttimer, Anne (ed.). Sustainable landscapes and lifeways: scale and appropriateness. Sterling, VA: Cork University Press. pp. 35–58. ISBN 978-1-85918-300-7. OCLC 45879916.
- Hägerstrand, Torsten; Carlstein, Tommy (December 2004). "The two vistas". Geografiska Annaler: Series B, Human Geography. 86 (4): 315–323. doi:10.1111/j.0435-3684.2004.00170.x. S2CID 218589178.
- Hägerstrand, Torsten (2009). Kajsa Ellegård; Uno Svedin; Bo Lenntorp (eds.). Tillvaroväven (in Swedish). Stockholm: Forskningsrådet Formas. ISBN 978-91-540-6033-7. OCLC 456875435.

== See also ==
- Time geography
