= Kenneth Hedberg =

American chemist (1920–2019)

Kenneth Wayne Hedberg
- Born: February 2, 1920; Portland, Oregon, United States
- Died: January 5, 2019 (aged 98); Oregon, United States
- Education: Oregon State University, California Institute of Technology
- Known for: Molecular structure research, spectroscopy
- Spouse: Lise Hedberg (née Smedvik)
- Awards: Fulbright Scholarship, Guggenheim Fellowship, Sloan Fellowship
- Scientific career
- Fields: Chemistry
- Workplaces: Oregon State University
- Doctoral advisor: Linus Pauling, Verner Shoemaker

Kenneth Wayne Hedberg (February 2, 1920 – January 5, 2019) was an American chemist.

== Biography ==
Hedberg was born on February 2, 1920, to parents Gustave and Ruth. As a child, he lived in Portland, Oregon and Hoquiam, Washington. Hedberg completed high school in Medford, Oregon. Upon graduating from Oregon State University, Hedberg worked for Shell Development Company. After World War II ended, Hedberg returned to school, obtaining a doctorate at California Institute of Technology in 1948, under Linus Pauling and Verner Shoemaker. Hedberg was awarded a Fulbright Scholarship and Guggenheim Fellowship. While researching in Norway, Hedberg met Lise Smedvik (later Lise Hedberg). The two returned to the United States in 1956 and joined the Oregon State University faculty. Some of Hedberg's later research was funded by a Sloan Fellowship. He taught at Oregon State until 1987. Over the course of his career, Hedberg was elected a fellow of the American Physical Society and the American Association for the Advancement of Science. He was also elected to membership within the Norwegian Academy of Science and Letters and awarded an honorary doctorate from the Norwegian University of Science and Technology. Hedberg died on January 5, 2019, aged 98.
