= Max Planck Institute for Sustainable Materials =

Materials Research institute in Düsseldorf, Germany

- Max-Planck-Institut für Nachhaltige Materialien
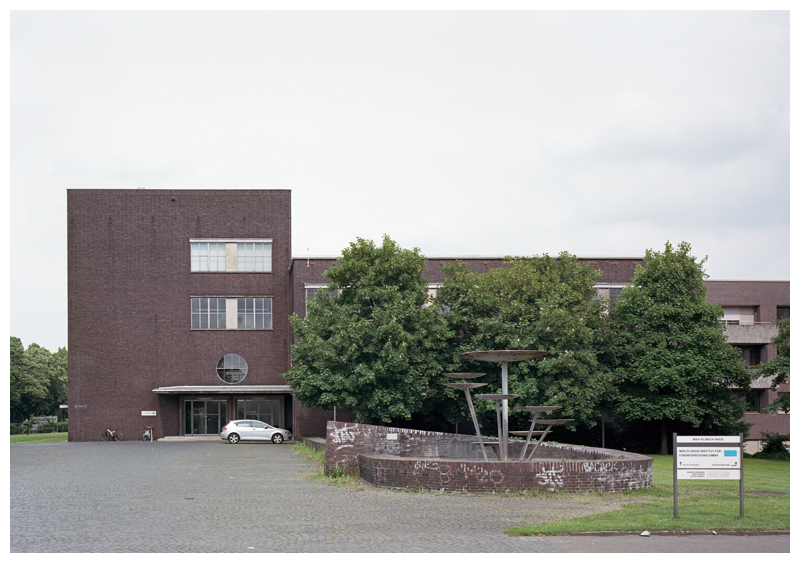
- Institute building in Düsseldorf
- Formation: 1917
- Type: Research institute
- Legal status: GmbH
- Purpose: Basic research
- Location: Düsseldorf, Germany
- Coordinates: 51°14′21″N 6°48′52″E
- Fields: Chemistry, physics, materials science, informatics, engineering, metallurgy
- Owner: Max Planck Society
- Executive Director: Dierk Raabe
- Staff: 350
- Website: www.mpie.de/en

The Max Planck Institute for Sustainable Materials (MPI-SusMat) is a research institute of the Max Planck Society located in Düsseldorf, Germany. It conducts fundamental research in materials science with a focus on developing sustainable materials for applications in energy, mobility, infrastructure, and medicine.

The institute investigates how materials can be produced, used, and recycled in a climate-friendly and resource-efficient manner. Its research addresses challenges such as reducing greenhouse gas emissions from materials production and enabling a circular materials economy.

Founded in 1917 as the Kaiser Wilhelm Institute for Iron Research, the institute became part of the Max Planck Society in 1948. In 2024, it was renamed to reflect its strategic focus on sustainability, decarbonisation, and circular materials research.

== Mission and impact ==
The institute's research aims to enable more sustainable industrial processes by reducing the environmental impact of materials production and use. Materials production accounts for a significant share of global greenhouse gas emissions, particularly in sectors such as steel and non-ferrous metals.

By developing new materials and processes, the institute contributes to climate change mitigation, resource efficiency, and the transition towards a circular economy.

== History ==
The institute was founded in 1917 as Kaiser Wilhelm Institute for Iron Research in Aachen, with Fritz Wüst being the founding director. It moved to Düsseldorf in 1921 and relocated from the "Rheinische Metallwaarenfabrik" to its current location in 1935. In 1943, it moved temporarily to Clausthal and in 1946 back to Düsseldorf.

The long-term institutional co-sponsoring by Steel Institute VDEh determined a unique example of a public private partnership for both the Max Planck Society and European industry and was intended to ensure a close link between knowledge-oriented and pre-competitive basic research on the one hand and commercial relevance on the other.

After the VDEh had reduced its annual subsidies since 2016 due to structural problems in the steel industry and completely terminated the financing agreement in 2021, it transferred all shares to the Max Planck Society, making it the sole shareholder.

In April 2024, the institute was renamed to Max Planck Institute for Sustainable Materials to reflect its expanded focus on sustainability, decarbonisation, and circular materials research.

== Fields of research ==
The institute's research focuses on understanding the relationship between the structure, properties, and performance of materials across multiple length scales, from the atomic to the macroscopic level.

Key research areas include:

- sustainable and low-carbon materials production
- circular use and recycling of metals and alloys
- artificial intelligence and digitalisation in materials design
- materials for extreme environments

These research activities aim to improve the efficiency, durability, and environmental footprint of materials used in modern technologies.

The research is conducted in four main departments and independent, interdepartmental and partner groups. The four departments are:

- Computational Materials Design (director: Professor Jörg Neugebauer)
- Interface Chemistry and Surface Engineering (director position vacant; provisional head: Professor Jörg Neugebauer)
- Circular Metallurgy and Alloy Design (Professor Dierk Raabe)
- Structure and Nano-/Micromechanics of Materials (Professor Gerhard Dehm)

== Applications ==
Applications of the institute's research include lightweight materials for transportation, high-performance alloys for energy systems, materials for hydrogen technologies, and recyclable materials for electronics and infrastructure.

== Literature ==
- Adolf von Harnack: Rede zur Weihe des Kaiser-Wilhelm-Instituts für Eisenforschung. 1921, In: Adolf von Harnack . Wissenschaftspolitische Reden und Aufsätze. zusammengestellt und herausgegeben von Bernhard Fabian, Olms-Weidmann, Hildeheim-Zürich-New York 2001, ISBN 3-487-11369-4 (German).
- Max-Planck-Gesellschaft (Hrsg.): Max-Planck-Institut für Eisenforschung, Reihe: Berichte und Mitteilungen der Max-Planck-Gesellschaft 1993/5, ISSN 0341-7778 (German).
