= Stahlinstitut VDEh =

German steel industry organization

The Steel Institute VDEh (German: Stahlinstitut VDEh) is a techno-economic organisation of the German steel industry headquartered in Düsseldorf, Germany. The institute was founded in 1860 as "Technical association for steelmaking" (Technischer Verein für Eisenhüttenwesen). Between 1880 and 2002, the association was called "Association of German steel manufacturers" (Verein Deutscher Eisenhüttenleute) or VDEh for short. In 2003, the name was changed to its present form "Steel Institute VDEh" (Stahlinstitut VDEh), while retaining the old abbreviation VDEh as part of the name.

The Steel Institute VDEh is one of the largest steelmaking associations in the world. It has approximately 6600 members and 160 supporting companies. The current chairman of the association is Henrik Adam and the CEO is Stefanie Brockmann.

The association supports the development of steel technology and steel as a material through the technical, techno-economical and scientific co-operation of engineers. It offers its own training courses and co-operates with DIN e.V. in defining technical norms. The Steel Institute VDEh co-ordinates the joint research projects of its members and has its own research facility, the VDEh-Betriebsforschungsinstitut (BFI). The shares in the Max Planck Institute for Iron Research were transferred to the Max Planck Society in March 2020. The Steel Institute VDEh publishes technical reports, scientific journals and books through Verlag Stahleisen GmbH and maintains a technical library that is accessible to the public. The three specialist journals – stahl und eisen, MPT International and stahlmarkt – are printed and also available as mobile tablet apps and e-papers on the internet. The new stahl und eisen INTERNATIONAL is only published electronically (four issues per year).

The Steel Institute VDEh has been involved in the standardisation of steel products for over a hundred years. The offices of the Normenausschuss Eisen und Stahl (FES) (the Committee for Iron and Steel Standardisation) are associated with the VDEh regarding their organisation, financing and personnel. The FES specialists elaborate standards in the area of steel and iron according to the rules of the Deutsches Institut für Normung (DIN) (The German Institute for Standardisation).

== Websites ==
- Website of the Steel Institute VDEh
- Website of the VDEh-Betriebsforschungsinstitut (BFI)
- Website of the Verlag Stahleisen GmbH
