= Patricia Lago =

Italian computer scientist

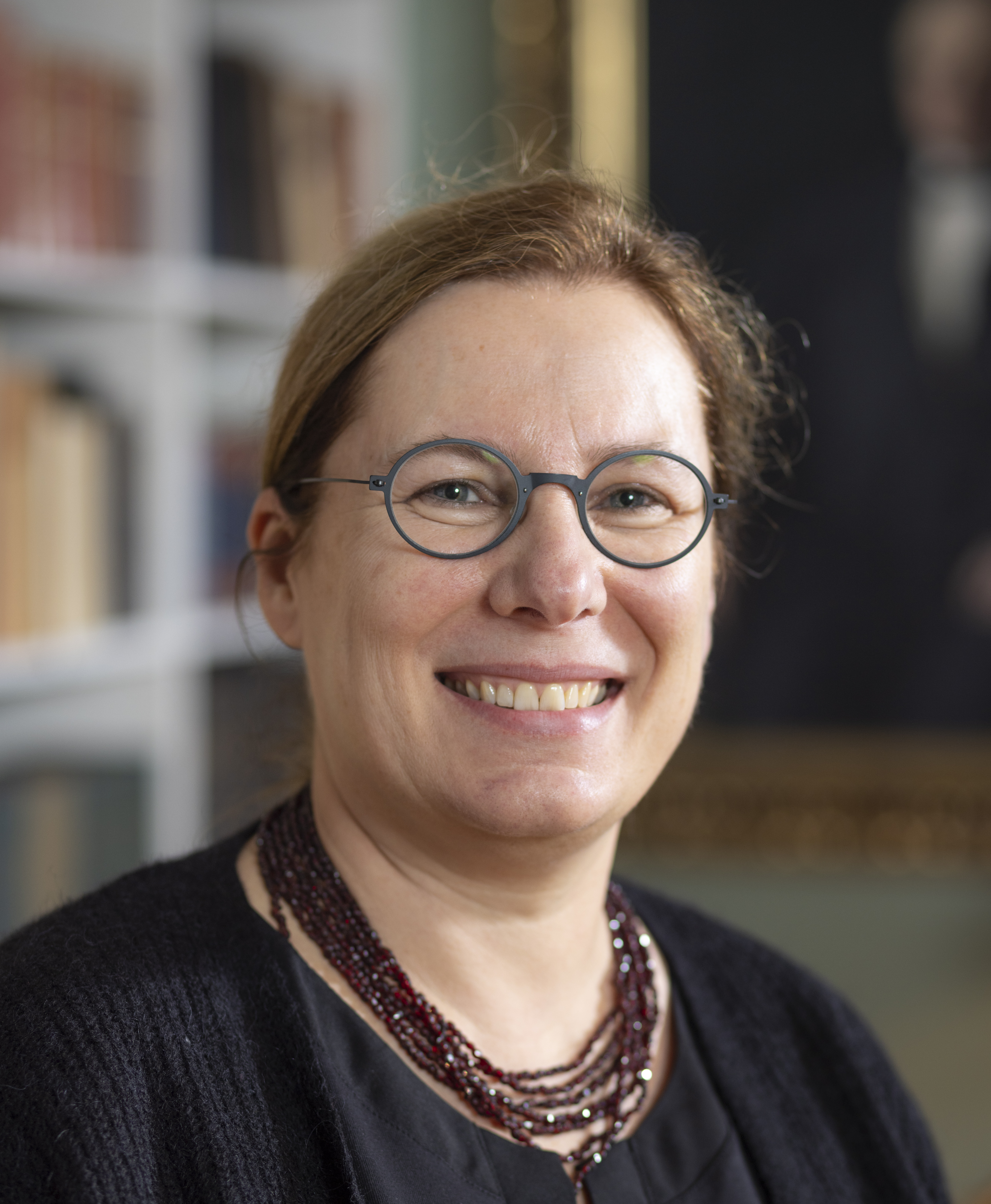
- Lago in 2022
- Education: University of Pisa; Polytechnic University of Turin
- Scientific career
- Fields: Computer science
- Workplaces: Vrije Universiteit Amsterdam

Patricia Lago is an Italian computer scientist. She is a full professor at the Vrije Universiteit Amsterdam in the Netherlands, where she leads the Software and Sustainability Research Group S2, which she established and has led since 2011. Her research interests are software engineering, software architecture and software sustainability.

== Education and career ==
My approach to academic research is characterized by action research driven by social- and industry-relevant research problems and exploitation of empirical research methods

— Patricia Lago.

Lago took her master's degree in computer science at the Università degli Studi di Pisa in 1992, and in 1996 a Ph.D. degree in control and computer engineering at the Politecnico di Torino. After completing her Ph.D. degree, she was associated with the Politecnico di Torino as a postdoctoral researcher and then as an assistant professor until 2003. Since 2003 she has been employed at the Vrije Universiteit Amsterdam, first as an associate professor, and since 2015 as professor.

The aim of Lago's research is to create software engineering knowledge that makes software better, smarter and more sustainable. The research has been applied to areas such as smart cities, digital transformation and digital healthcare. She has been an editor for several key professional journals and chaired program boards for important international research conferences.

In 2022, Lago was the recipient of an Honorary Doctorate, dr.h.c., from the Norwegian University of Science and Technology (NTNU).
