= Uno Svedin =

Swedish sustainability scientist

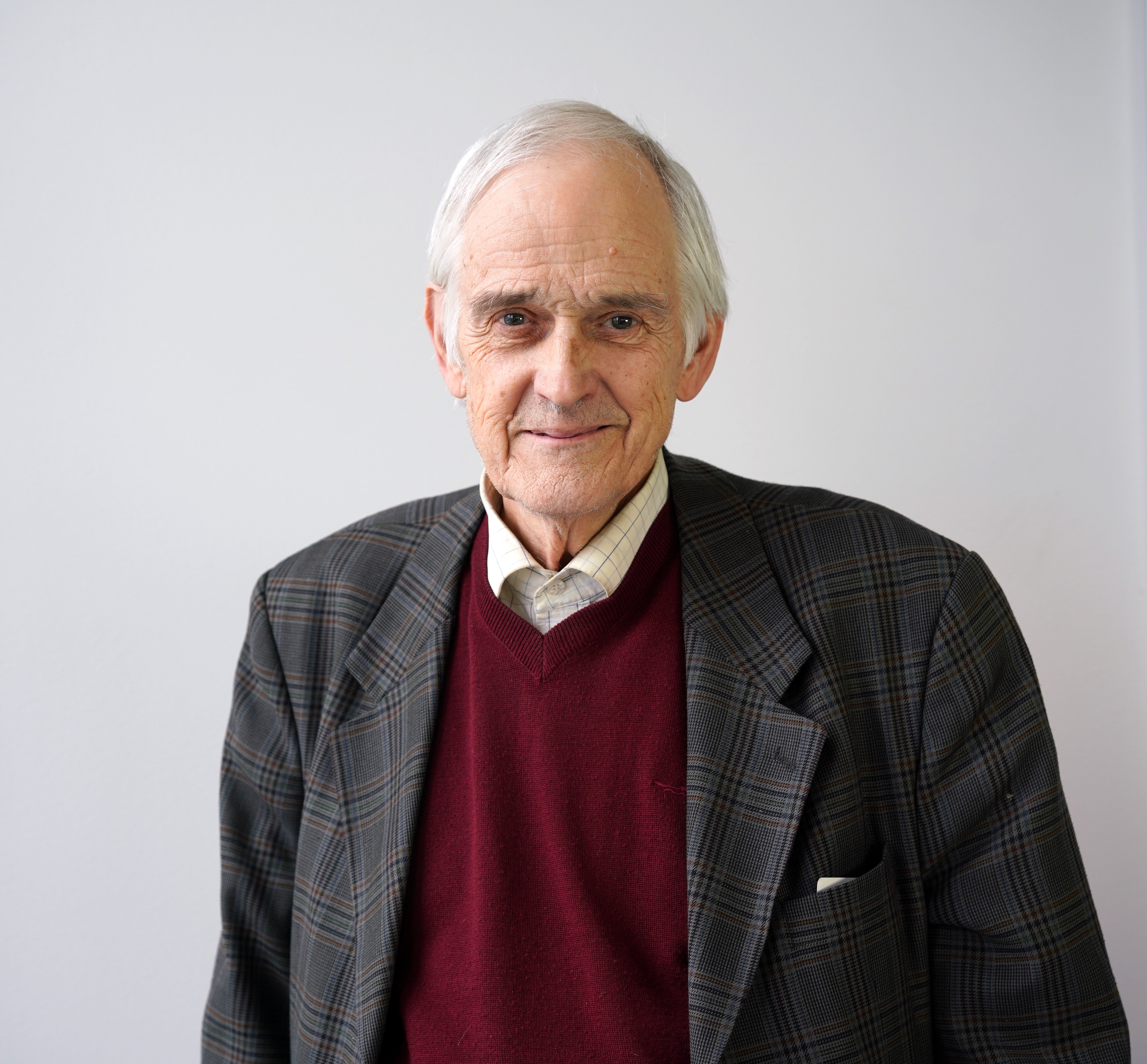
- Uno Svedin
- Born: 22 February 1943
- Died: 30 January 2026
- Education: Stockholm University
- Known for: Sustainability science Planetary boundaries Science–policy interfaces
- Awards: Doctor honoris causa, Linköping University (2010)
- Scientific career
- Fields: Sustainability science Science–policy interaction Research governance

Uno Svedin (22 February 1943 – 30 January 2026) was a Swedish sustainability researcher who influenced the creation of sustainability science internationally and in Sweden. His work focused on science-policy interaction and research governance, with particular attention to interdisciplinary approaches to sustainability and resilience.

He has been described as an "accomplished science organizer" who played a key role in bridging ecology and policy in the development of global environmental governance.

== Education ==
Svedin received a PhD from Stockholm University in 1974 following doctoral work in physics.

== Career ==
Svedin is a senior researcher at the Stockholm Resilience Centre at Stockholm University.

Earlier in his career, Svedin held senior positions in research policy and research funding organizations. He worked at the Swedish Council for Planning and Coordination of Research (FRN) and later served as Director of International Affairs at the Swedish Research Council for Environment, Agricultural Sciences and Spatial Planning (Formas). From 1981 to 2001 he was director of research at the Swedish Council for Planning and Coordination of Research (Forskningsrådsnämnden, FRN), then international director at the funding agency Formas until 2010.

At the European and international level, Svedin has served as chair of the European Consultative Forum on the Environment and Sustainable Development, chair of the International Group of Funding Agencies for Global Change Research (IGFA), and as a board member and president of EURAGRI.

He was also an adjunct professor at Tema, Linköping University, beginning in 1994. In 2010, he was awarded an honorary doctorate (doctor honoris causa) by Linköping University (Faculty of Arts and Sciences and Educational Sciences).

== Role in the emergence of sustainability science ==
In October 2000, Svedin was a co-organizer of an influential international workshop on sustainability science held at Friibergh Manor near Örsundsbro in southern Sweden. The meeting convened researchers from natural and social sciences to discuss how scientific research could better address challenges of sustainable development through integrative, problem-driven approaches. Participants included William C. Clark, Bert Bolin, Jane Lubchenco, and Robert Corell, among others associated with global environmental change research and science–policy interfaces.

The workshop produced a consensus statement outlining research challenges and priorities for sustainability-oriented research and is frequently cited in retrospective accounts as an early forum that helped consolidate sustainability science as a distinct interdisciplinary field, and led to the 2001 Science Policy Forum article that defined Sustainability Science, of which Svedin was a co-author.

== Contributions to sustainability and resilience research ==
Svedin was a co-author of the 2009 Nature article "A safe operating space for humanity", which introduced the planetary boundaries framework. This framework has become one of the most cited concepts in modern environmental science, being cited more than 10,000 times. He was also a co-author of the related 2009 article "Planetary boundaries: Exploring the safe operating space for humanity", published in Ecology and Society. Svedin was one of a small core group who participated in a May 2008 meeting where the planetary boundaries concept was being refined before it was publicly introduced later than year.

In later work, Svedin contributed to research integrating social, cultural, and institutional dimensions into sustainability and resilience studies. He co-authored publications on bio-cultural refugia and agricultural biodiversity, sense of place in social–ecological systems research, and relational values and stewardship in sustainability governance.

Svedin's publications have been cited over 50,000 times.

== Social commitment ==
In addition to his academic career, Svedin has been deeply involved in social work in Stockholm for over five decades. Alongside his wife, Elisabeth Svedin, he is a central figure in the movement Ny Gemenskap ("New Community"), which works to support homeless and socially vulnerable individuals through social hubs, meals, and cultural activities. The Svedins have focused on creating inclusive environments where culture and music play a significant role in social recovery.

== Honours ==
- Honorary Doctor (Doctor honoris causa), Linköping University, 2010.
- Eldsjälspriset, Stiftelsen Oscar Hirschs Minne, 2017 (awarded jointly with Elisabeth Svedin for their lifelong commitment to the organization Ny Gemenskap and their work with vulnerable populations in society).
