= Long-Qing Chen =

Chinese-American engineer (born 1962)

Long-Qing Chen (Chinese: 陈龙庆; born 1962) is a Chinese-American materials scientist, engineer, and academic. He is Evan Pugh University Professor and Donald W. Hamer Professor of Materials Science and Engineering at the Pennsylvania State University, where he also holds appointments in engineering science and mechanics, mathematics, and physics. He is known for contributions to computational materials science, particularly the development and application of phase-field methods for predicting phase transformations and microstructure evolution in materials.

After earning degrees from Zhejiang University, Stony Brook University, and the Massachusetts Institute of Technology, Chen joined the Penn State faculty in 1992. His research interests include computational materials science, phase transformations, ferroelectric and multiferroic materials, additive manufacturing, energy materials, and quantum materials. He has served as founding editor-in-chief of npj Computational Materials, a journal published by Nature Portfolio.

Chen was elected to the United States National Academy of Engineering in 2025 for "making the phase-field method the most powerful tool for predicting the mesoscopic microstructure and properties of engineering materials". He is also a Foreign Member of Academia Europaea and a recipient of a Guggenheim Fellowship. He has been recognized as a Clarivate Highly Cited Researcher and is a Fellow of several scientific societies, including the Materials Research Society, The Minerals, Metals & Materials Society, the American Physical Society, the American Association for the Advancement of Science, ASM International, and the American Ceramic Society.

== Early life and education ==
Chen received a Bachelor of Science degree in Materials Science and Engineering from Zhejiang University in 1982. He subsequently earned a Master of Science degree in Materials Science and Engineering from the State University of New York at Stony Brook in 1985 and a Ph.D. in Materials Science and Engineering from the Massachusetts Institute of Technology in 1990.

Following completion of his doctoral studies, Chen conducted postdoctoral research with materials scientist Armen G. Khachaturyan at Rutgers University before joining the faculty of Pennsylvania State University in 1992.

== Career and research ==
Chen joined the Pennsylvania State University faculty as an assistant professor in 1992, became an associate professor in 1998, and was promoted to professor in 2002. He was later appointed Donald W. Hamer Professor of Materials Science and Engineering and Evan Pugh University Professor.

His research focuses on computational materials science and the thermodynamics and kinetics of materials. He is particularly associated with the development and application of phase-field methods for modeling microstructure evolution, phase transformations, ferroic domain structures, and mesoscale phenomena in engineering materials. His work has addressed metallic alloys, ferroelectric and multiferroic materials, energy materials, additive manufacturing, and quantum materials.

Chen has also served as founding editor-in-chief of npj Computational Materials and has directed the U.S. Department of Energy Center for Computational Mesoscale Materials Science (COMMS).

== Honors and awards ==
Chen was elected to the United States National Academy of Engineering in 2025. The academy cited his contributions to advancing the phase-field method as a predictive tool for engineering materials.

In 2023, he was elected a Foreign Member of Academia Europaea for "pioneering contributions to the development and applications of phase-field method to understanding and predicting materials microstructure and property evolution".

He received a Guggenheim Fellowship in Engineering in 2005. His other honors include the Materials Research Society Materials Theory Award, the Humboldt Research Award, the TMS John Bardeen Award, the TMS Cyril Stanley Smith Award, the TMS William Hume-Rothery Award, the ASM International Silver Medal, and the IEEE Ferroelectrics Recognition Award.

Chen has been recognized as a Clarivate Highly Cited Researcher in materials science and related fields.

== Professional memberships ==
Chen is a Fellow of the Materials Research Society (MRS), The Minerals, Metals & Materials Society (TMS), the American Physical Society (APS), the American Association for the Advancement of Science (AAAS), ASM International, and the American Ceramic Society (ACerS).
