= Lars von Haartman =

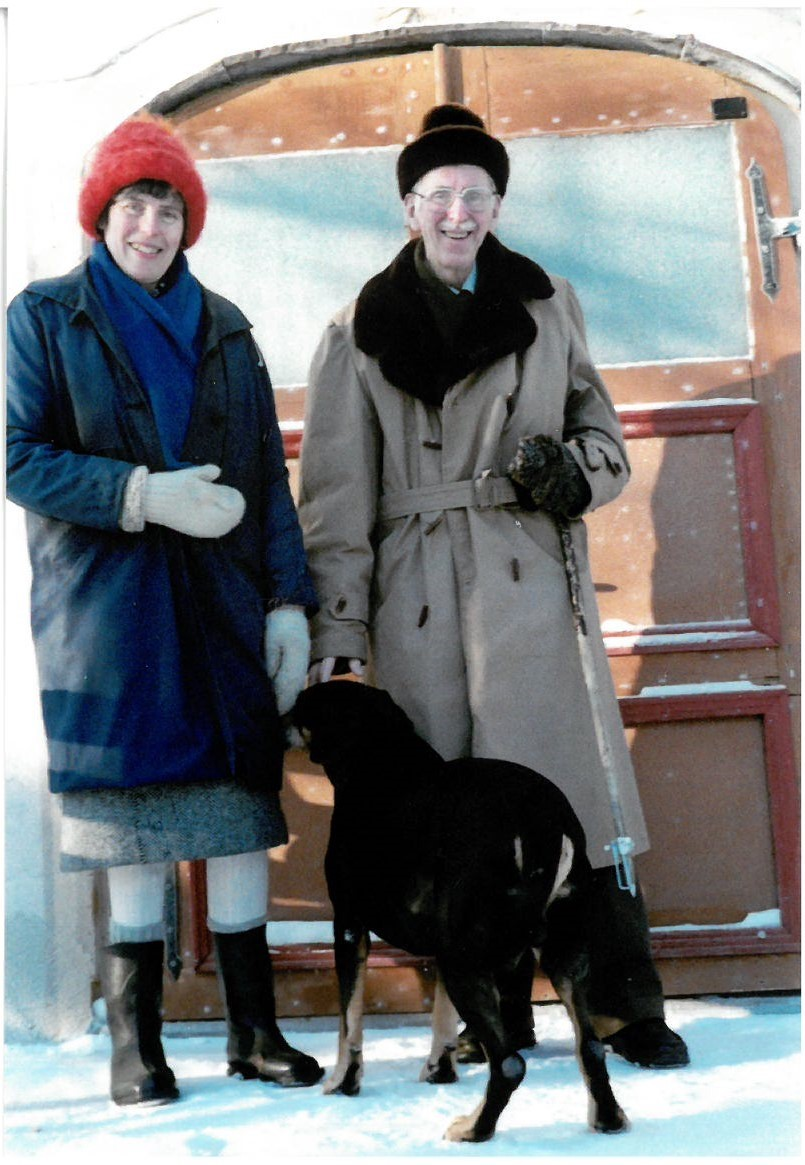
Brita and Lars von Haartman, 1987

Baron Lars Arvid Axel von Haartman (24 March 1919 – 28 October 1998) was a Finnish ornithologist, artist, poet and writer who came from a noble family of Swedish descent. He was best known for examining the population dynamics of birds through a long-term study of the pied flycatcher. He served as a professor of zoology at the University of Helsinki from 1968 to 1984.

== Life and work ==
Lars von Haartman was born in an old country manor Lempisaari in Askainen, near Turku. An ancestor was Lars Gabriel von Haartman. His grandfather August von Haartman and father Lars Gabriel (1877–1956) had been interested in birds. His mother was Hellen Maria Kumlin (1883–1969) who was earlier married to Johannes Sundwall. Their home library included classic books including those by Charles Darwin. While at school he accompanied classmates Göran Bergman and Eric Fabricius who also became ornithologists. Influenced by the studies of Margaret Morse Nice on the song sparrow and the work of David Lack on the European robin, he began to study pied flycatchers on his family estate of Lemsjöholm, colour banding them from 1941. He published initially in German but he was fluent in several languages. His doctoral thesis published in 1945 was on coastal birds Zur Biologie der Wasser- und Ufervögel im Schärenmeer Südwest-Finnlands . He took an interest in the evolution of clutch size, hole nesting, polygamy, migration while also taking an interest in changes in Finnish avifauna. He began a nest-card program in Finland in the 1950s, managing the project single-handedly. This resulted in a major work on the nesting of Finnish birds. He organized the International Ornithological Congress at Helsinki in 1958 and served as a professor of zoology at the University of Helsinki from 1968. He also wrote poetry and was an artist as well as an acclaimed art critic, writing for the Hufvudstadsbladet.

His long-term observations on the breeding of pied flycatchers was used to determine climate-related changes. He married textile artist Brita Maria Fortelius in 1964.
