= Toru H. Okabe =

Japanese scientist (born 1965)

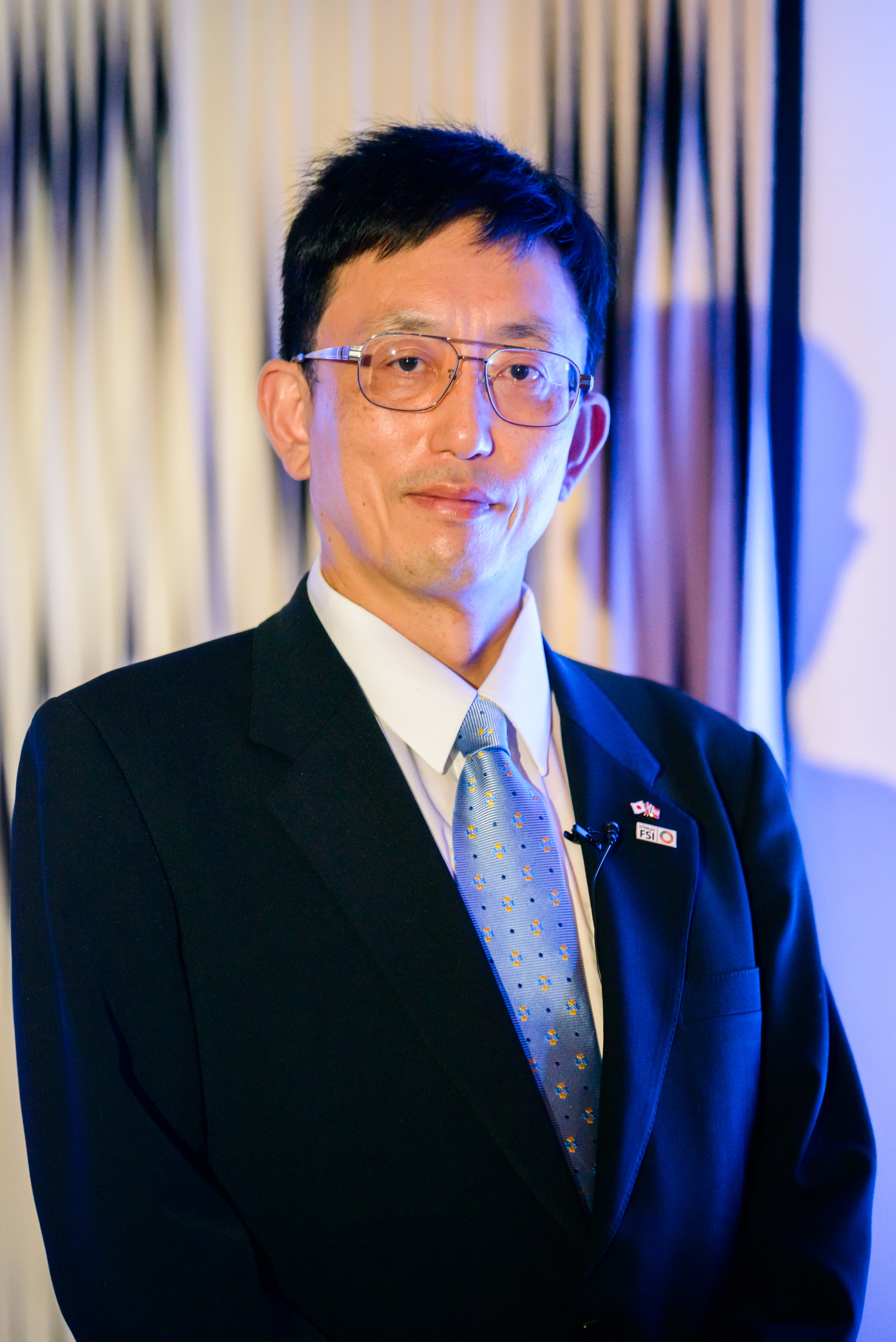
Toru H. Okabe

Toru H. Okabe (born December 4, 1965) is a Japanese scientist specializing in materials science, environmental science, resource circulation engineering, and rare metals process engineering, particularly for electronic waste. His most recent work involves the advancement of new processing technology to recycle rare metals like niobium, titanium, yttrium, rhenium, neodymium, other lanthanides and precious metals. He is also involved in sustainable urban mining.

== Biography ==
Toru H. Okabe graduated from The Japanese School in London, in 1981, and from Senior High School at Otsuka, University of Tsukuba, Japan, in 1984. He then received his Bachelor's and master's degrees in engineering, Metallurgy, from Kyoto University, Japan, in 1988 and 1990 respectively. Okabe pursued his doctoral studies in Engineering, Metallurgy and Materials Science, at Kyoto University, during which he developed processing techniques for reactive metals such as titanium and niobium. He received his PhD in 1993.

Supported by the Japan Society for the Promotion of Science (JSPS, Postdoctoral Fellowship for Research Abroad), Okabe took up residence for 3 years as a postdoctoral researcher at the Massachusetts Institute of Technology (MIT), USA. He then returned to Japan to become Research Associate at the Institute of Advanced Materials Processing, Tohoku University (currently known as the Institute of Multidisciplinary Research for Advanced Materials, IMRAM) where he remained till the end of 2000.

In 2001, Okabe began his stint at the Institute of Industrial Science, University of Tokyo, as an associate professor. He then progressed to professorship, and became the Vice President from 2019 to 2021. Presently, Okabe is serving as the Director-General of the Institute of Industrial Science at the University of Tokyo.

In 2021, Toru H. Okabe received the Degree of Doctor Honoris Causa at the Norwegian University of Science and Technology (NTNU), for working closely with researchers at NTNU for many years, and was appointed an Honorary Doctor at NTNU.

== Awards ==
1. 14th Honda Memorial Silver Prize (Honda-kinen-shourei-shou) from the Honda Memorial Foundation in Tokyo, May 19, 1993
2. 11th Inoue Research Prize (Inoue-kenkyu-shourei-shou) from the Inoue Foundation for Science in Tokyo, February 6, 1995
3. 23rd Murakami Prize (Murakami-Shourei-shou) from the Murakami Memorial Foundation in Sendai, May 15, 2003
4. The 38th Ichimura Prize in Technology–Meritorious Achievement Prize from The New Technology Development Foundation, April 28, 2006
5. 65th JIM Meritorious Award from the Japan Institute of Metals at the 140th Spring meeting, Chiba, March 27, 2007
6. 26th Technology Award (Gijutsu-shou) from The Japan Titanium Society, November 9, 2009
7. 2012 Nikkei Global Environmental Technology Awards for the establishment of innovative approaches to the global environment, Nikkei Inc., November 7, 2012
8. The 12th Green and Sustainable Chemistry Award (GSC Award), The Minister of the Environment Award (The Japan Association for Chemical Innovation (JACI), Green and Sustainable Chemistry Network (GSCN)), “Development of Green Recycling Technology for Rare Earth Metals,” June 6, 2013
9. The ASM Henry Marion Howe Medal for 2013 for the paper titled, “Effective Dissolution of Platinum by Using Chloride Salts in Recovery Process,” ASM International (The Materials Information Society), Montreal, Canada, October 29, 2013
10. 13th Honda Frontier Prize (Honda-Frontier -shou) from the Honda Memorial Foundation, May 27, 2016
11. 86th Hoko Prize (Hattori-Hoko-Shou) from the Hattori Hokokai Foundation, October 7, 2016.
12. The Commendation for Science and Technology by the Minister of Education, Culture, Sports, Science, and Technology (MEXT), Prizes for Science and Technology, Public Understanding Promotion Category, April 17, 2019
13. TMS Extraction & Processing Division Pyrometallurgy Best Paper Award, February 26, 2020
14. The Degree of Doctor Honoris Causa at NTNU, Honorary Doctor of the Norwegian University of Science and Technology (NTNU), March 26, 2021
15. The Commendation for Science and Technology by the Minister of Education, Culture, Sports, Science and Technology (MEXT), Prizes for Science and Technology, Research Category, April 14, 2021

== Noteworthy publications ==
=== Original articles ===
- 'Preparation and Characterization of Extra-Low-Oxygen Titanium', T. H. Okabe, T. Oishi, and K. Ono: J. Alloy. Compound., vol.184 (1992) pp. 43–56. doi:10.1016/0925-8388(92)90454-H
- 'Electrochemical Deoxidation of Titanium', T. H. Okabe, M. Nakamura, T. Oishi, and K. Ono: Met. Trans. B, vol.24B, (1993) pp. 449–455. doi:10.1007/BF02666427
- 'Electrochemical Deoxidation of Yttrium-Oxygen Solid Solution', T. H. Okabe, T. Deura, T. Oishi, K. Ono, and D. R. Sadoway: J. Alloy. Compound., vol.237 (1996) pp. 150–154. doi:10.1016/0925-8388(95)02129-9
- 'Metallothermic Reduction as an Electronically Mediated Reaction', T. H. Okabe and D. R. Sadoway: J. Mater. Res., vol.12, no.13 (1998) pp. 3372–3377. doi:10.1557/JMR.1998.0459
- 'Production of Niobium Powder by Electronically Mediated Reaction (EMR) Using Calcium as a Reductant', T. H. Okabe, Il Park, K. T. Jacob, and Y. Waseda: J. Alloy. Compound., vol.288 (1999) pp. 200–210. doi:10.1016/S0925-8388(99)00130-9
- 'Direct Extraction and Recovery of Neodymium Metal from Magnet Scrap', T. H. Okabe, O. Takeda, K. Fukuda, and Y. Umetsu: Materials Trans. (JIM), vol.44, no.4 (2003) pp. 798–801. doi:10.2320/matertrans.44.798
- 'Titanium Powder Production by Preform Reduction Process (PRP)', T. H. Okabe, T. Oda, and Y. Mitsuda: J. Alloy. Compound., vol.364 (2004) pp. 156–163. doi:10.1016/S0925-8388(03)00610-8
- 'Effective Dissolution of Platinum by Using Chloride Salts in Recovery Process', C. Horike, K. Morita, and T. H. Okabe: Metall. Mater. Trans. B, vol.43, no.6 (2012), pp. 1300–1307. doi:10.1007/s11663-012-9746-z
- 'Direct Oxygen Removal Technique for Recycling Titanium Using Molten MgCl_{2} Salt', Toru H. Okabe, Y. Hamanaka, and Y. Taninouchi: Faraday Discussions, 190 (2016) pp. 109–126. doi:10.1039/C5FD00229J
- 'Bottlenecks in Rare Metal Supply and the Importance of Recycling: a Japanese Perspective', Toru H. Okabe: Mineral Proces. Extract. Metall., vol.126, no.1–2, (2017) pp. 22–32. doi:10.1080/03719553.2016.1268855
- 'Thermodynamic Considerations of Direct Oxygen Removal from Titanium by Utilizing the Deoxidation Capability of Rare Earth Metals', T. H. Okabe, C. Zheng, and Y. Taninouchi: Metall. Mater. Trans. B, vol. 49, no. 3, (2018) pp. 1056–1066. doi:10.1007/s11663-018-1172-4
- 'Thermodynamic Analysis of Deoxidation of Titanium Through the Formation of Rare Earth Oxyfluorides', T. H. Okabe, Y. Taninouchi, and C. Zheng: Metall. Mater. Trans. B, vol. 49, no. 6, (2018), pp. 3107–3117. doi:10.1007/s11663-018-1386-5

=== Review articles ===
- 'Producing Titanium Through an Electronically Mediated Reaction', T. H. Okabe and Y. Waseda: J. Metal., vol.49 (1997) pp. 28–32. doi:10.1007/BF02914710
- 'Current Status on Resource and Recycling Technology for Rare Earths', O. Takeda, T. H. Okabe: Metall. Mater. Trans. E, vol.1, no.2, (2014) pp 160–173. doi:10.1007/s40553-014-0016-7
- 'Current Status of Titanium Recycling and Related Technologies', O. Takeda, T. H. Okabe: J. Metal., vol.71, no.6 (2019) pp. 1981–1990. doi:10.1007/s11837-018-3278-1
- 'Recent Progress in Titanium Extraction and Recycling', O. Takeda, T. Ouchi, and T. H. Okabe: Metall. Mater. Transact. B, (2020) pp. 1315–1328. doi:10.1007/s11663-020-01898-6

=== Books ===
- 'Removal of Oxygen in Reactive Metals' in Purification Process and Characterization of Ultra High Purity Metals, T. H. Okabe (Shared author): edited by Y. Waseda and M. Isshiki, Springer, Berlin (2001) (total 411 pages) pp. 3–37. ISBN 978-3-642-56255-6
- Extractive Metallurgy of Titanium, 1st Edition: Conventional and Recent Advances in Extraction and Production of Titanium Metal, T. H. Okabe (Shared author): Editors: Z. Z. Fang, F. Froes, Y. Zhang, Elsevier (2019) (Page Count: 436). Paperback ISBN 9780128172001, eBook ISBN 9780128172018
  - Chapter 5 - Fundamentals of thermochemical reduction of TiCl_{4} (T. H. Okabe and O. Takeda) pp. 65–96.
  - Chapter 8 - Metallothermic reduction of TiO_{2} (T. H. Okabe) pp. 131–164.
  - Chapter 16 - Recycling of Ti (O. Takeda and T. H. Okabe) pp. 363–388.

To see the full list of his books and publications click here.
