= Richard J. Spontak =

American chemical engineer and scientist

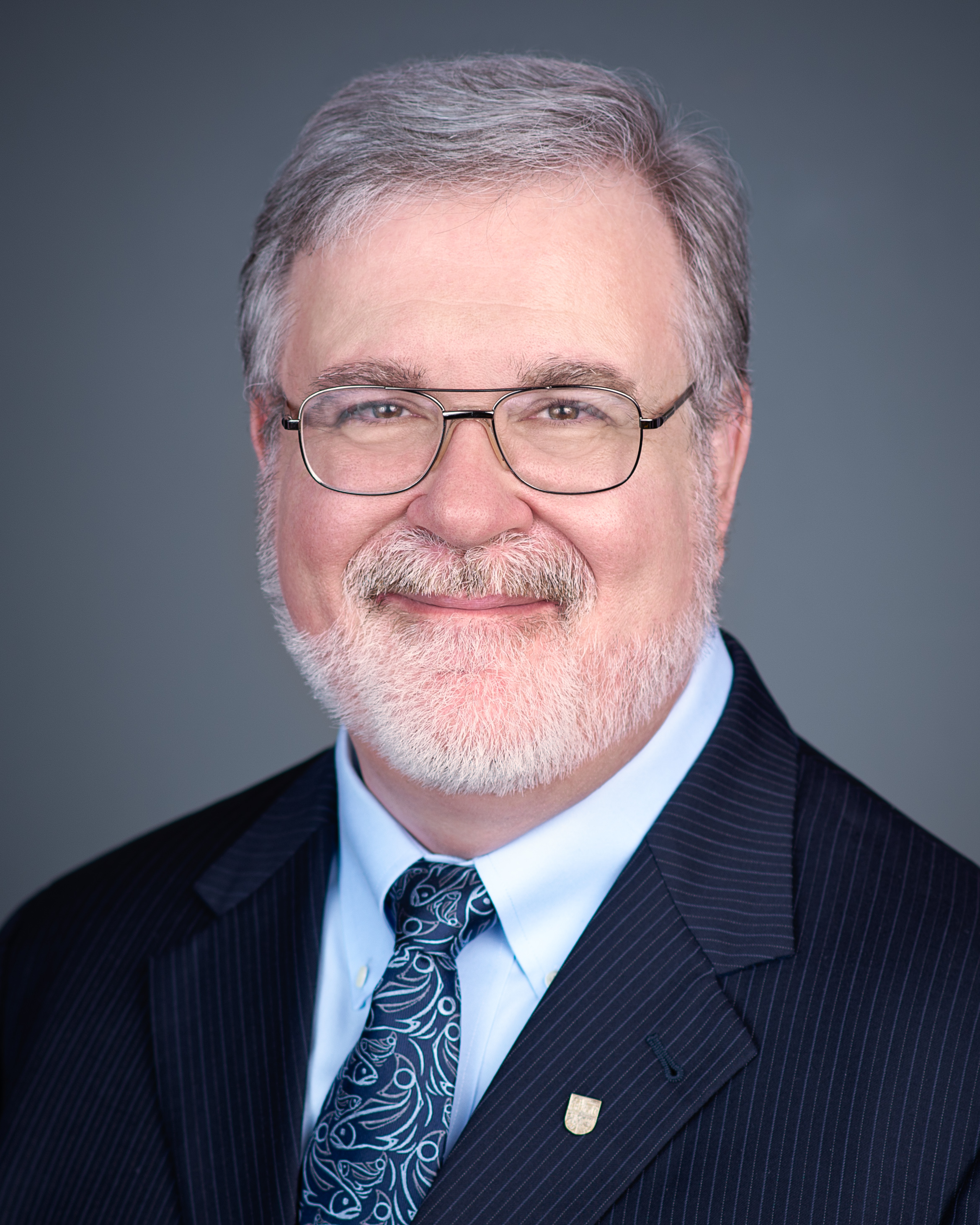
- Born: Richard John Spontak; 1961 (age 64–65); Pottsville, Pennsylvania, United States
- Occupations: Chemical engineer and materials scientist
- Spouse: Josephine U. Spontak

Academic background
- Education: Pennsylvania State University (B.S.); University of California at Berkeley (Ph.D.)
- Doctoral advisor: Michael C. Williams

Academic work
- Institutions: North Carolina State University

Richard John Spontak (born 1961, Pottsville, Pennsylvania) is an American chemical engineer and polymer materials scientist. He is a Distinguished Professor of Chemical & Biomolecular Engineering and Professor of Materials Science & Engineering at North Carolina State University.

Spontak has collaborated extensively with researchers at international institutions, including the Norwegian University of Science and Technology (NTNU).

In March 2024, he was awarded an honorary doctorate from NTNU.

== Early life and education ==
Spontak was born in Pottsville, Pennsylvania in 1961 and resided with his parents (Peter and Helen D. Spontak) in Saint Clair, Pennsylvania. In 1975, he was the Pottsville Republican Spelling Bee champion and participated in the Scripps National Spelling Bee in Washington, D.C. In 1976, his poem celebrating the U.S. bicentennial was entered into the U.S. Congressional Record. He earned his bachelor's degree in chemical engineering in 1983 from the Pennsylvania State University. Later supervised by Michael C. Williams, Spontak received his Ph.D. in chemical engineering from the University of California at Berkeley in 1988.

He subsequently pursued post-doctoral research in liquid crystalline polymers with Alan H. Windle at the University of Cambridge (UK) and in small-angle scattering with Tormod Riste and Jon Samseth at the Institute for Energy Technology (Norway).

== Career ==
In 1988, Spontak was a Research Scholar at the University of Cambridge in Cambridge, United Kingdom. In 1989, he worked as a Research Fellow at the Institute for Energy Technology in Kjeller, Norway.

Spontak began his career as a researcher in the Corporate Research Division at The Procter and Gamble Company, where he remained from 1990 until 1992. In 1992, he joined the faculty at North Carolina State University. He is currently an Alumni Distinguished Undergraduate and Graduate Professor, Distinguished Professor of Chemical and Biomolecular Engineering and Professor of Materials Science & Engineering at North Carolina State University.

He has also held visiting appointments at various universities around the world, including the Lars Onsager Professor at NTNU in Norway, Erudite Professor at the Mahatma Gandhi University in India, Alexander von Humboldt Research Fellow at the University of Freiburg in Germany, and Tewkesbury Fellow at the University of Melbourne in Australia.

He has sat on the advisory boards of more than 20 international journals and holds editorial positions in three of them as of 2023.

== Publications ==
Spontak's research includes over 300 peer-reviewed journal publications, including:

- Jinnai, Hiroshi; Nishikawa, Yukihiro; Spontak, Richard J.; Smith, Steven D.; Agard, David A.; Hashimoto, Takeji (2000-01-17). "Direct Measurement of Interfacial Curvature Distributions in a Bicontinuous Block Copolymer Morphology". Physical Review Letters. 84 (3): 518–521. Bibcode:2000PhRvL..84..518J. doi:10.1103/PhysRevLett.84.518. ISSN 0031-9007. PMID 11015953.
- Merkel, T. C.; Freeman, B. D.; Spontak, R. J.; He, Z.; Pinnau, I.; Meakin, P.; Hill, A. J. (2002-04-19). "Ultrapermeable, Reverse-Selective Nanocomposite Membranes". Science. 296 (5567): 519–522. Bibcode:2002Sci...296..519M. doi:10.1126/science.1069580. ISSN 0036-8075.
- Shankar, R.; Ghosh, T. K.; Spontak, R. J. (2007-09-03). "Electroactive Nanostructured Polymers as Tunable Actuators". Advanced Materials. 19 (17): 2218–2223. Bibcode:2007AdM....19.2218S. doi:10.1002/adma.200602644. ISSN 0935-9648.
- Peddinti, Bharadwaja S. T.; Scholle, Frank; Vargas, Mariana G.; Smith, Steven D.; Ghiladi, Reza A.; Spontak, Richard J. (2019). "Inherently self-sterilizing charged multiblock polymers that kill drug-resistant microbes in minutes". Materials Horizons. 6 (10): 2056–2062. doi:10.1039/C9MH00726A. ISSN 2051-6347.
- Sandru, Marius; Sandru, Eugenia M.; Ingram, Wade F.; Deng, Jing; Stenstad, Per M.; Deng, Liyuan; Spontak, Richard J. (2022). "An integrated materials approach to ultrapermeable and ultraselective CO 2 polymer membranes". Science. 376 (6588): 90–94. doi:10.1126/science.abj9351. ISSN 0036-8075. PMID 35357934.

== Selected awards ==
- 2006 – Cooperative Research Award in Polymer Science & Engineering, American Chemical Society (PMSE Division)
- 2007 – Ernst Ruska Prize, German Electron Microscopy Society
- 2008 – Chemistry of Thermoplastic Elastomers Award, American Chemical Society (Rubber Division)
- 2011 – Colwyn Medal, Institute of Materials, Minerals and Mining
- 2022 – Global Award Winner: Research Project of the Year, Institution of Chemical Engineers (UK)
- 2022 – SPSJ International Award, Society of Polymer Science (Japan)
- 2022 – Roy W. Tess Award in Coatings, American Chemical Society (PMSE Division)
- 2022 – Alexander Quarles Holladay Medal for Excellence, North Carolina State University
- 2023 – Underwood Medal, Institution of Chemical Engineers
- 2024 – Medal for Excellence, Institute of Materials, Minerals and Mining (UK)
- 2025 – Walston Chubb Award for Innovation, Sigma Xi: The Scientific Research Honor Society
- 2025 – Hollomon Award for Materials and Society, Acta Materialia, Inc

== Affiliations ==
Spontak is currently a fellow of the American Physical Society, American Chemical Society (PMSE Division), Institute of Materials, Minerals and Mining, International Association of Advanced Materials, Royal Society of Chemistry, and the Society of Plastics Engineers. He is also a member of the Norwegian Academy of Technological Sciences.

== Personal life ==
Since 1987, Spontak has been married to Josephine U. Spontak, with whom he has two children, Danielle and Joshua.
