= Software sustainability =

Research topic within software engineering

Software sustainability is a research topic within software engineering. Both researchers and industry practitioners have tried to identify ways to incorporate sustainability into software projects, with environmental, social, technical, economic and individual considerations.
