= Vishanthie Sewpaul =

Vishanthie Sewpaul PhD
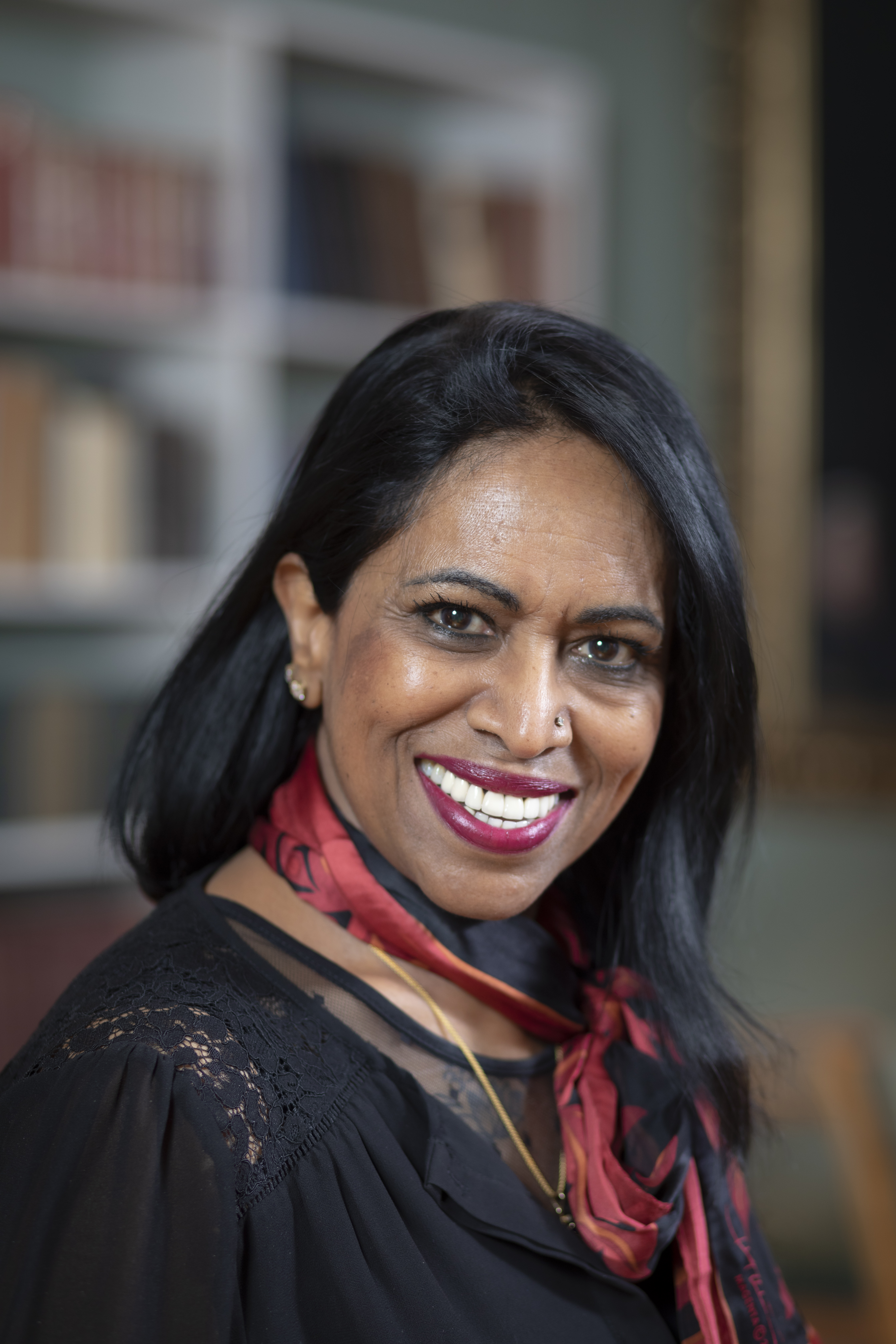
- Vishanthie Sewpaul

Academic background
- Education: University of KwaZulu Natal
- Thesis: Confronting the pain of infertility : feminist, ethical and religious aspects of infertility and the new reproductive technologies (1995)

Academic work
- Discipline: Social Work
- Institutions: University of KwaZulu-Natal; University of Stavanger

Vishanthie Sewpaul was a senior professor of social work at the University of KwaZulu Natal (UKZN), Durban, South Africa where she remains an Emeritus Professor, and she held a professor II position at the University of Stavanger, Stavanger, Norway, and a full professor position at Zayed University, UAE. Her research and teaching interests are in the fields of social justice, human rights, critical social work, emancipatory praxis and globalization among others. Sewpaul holds a bachelor's (B.A.) and a master's (M. Medical Sc.) in social work. She obtained her PhD from the University of Natal in 1995. The title of her dissertation was Confronting the pain of infertility: Feminist, ethical and religious aspects of infertilely and the new reproductive technologies.

== Personal life ==
Sewpaul grew up in South Africa under apartheid. She and her siblings were raised solely by her mother after Sewpaul's father committed suicide when she was five months old. These experiences influenced her research and teaching interests.

== Career ==
Sewpaul has lectured at universities around the world. She was a professor at the College of Education at Zayed University, UAE. She holds honorary doctoral degrees at Mid Sweden University, Sweden, Miguel de Cervantes University, Chile and at the Norwegian University of Science and Technology (NTNU), Norway. Sewpaul has also been a guest lecturer and keynote speaker at universities and events in many countries.

Sewpaul served as a vice-president on the board of the International Association of Schools of Social Work (IASSW) and as the president of the Association of Schools of Social Work in Africa (ASSWA). She also served as President of the Association of South African Social Work Education Institutions and was the inaugural President of the National Association of Social Workers, South Africa - the first unified, non-racial professional association for social workers in post apartheid South Africa.

== Publications ==
A selection of books, chapters in books and articles published by Sewpaul can be found on her staff profile at UKZN.

- Vishanthie Sewpaul 'The Arc of Our Paths: Growing into Wholeness' (A Memoir) 2020/2021
- Vishanthie Sewpaul, Linda Kreitzer and Tanusha Raniga 'The Tensions Between Culture and Human Rights: Afrocentricity and Emancipatory Social Work in a Global World' 2021.
- Vishanthie Sewpaul, Dorothee Hölscher Social Work in Times of Neoliberalism: A Postmodern Discourse 2004. ISBN 9780627026065
- Vishanthie Sewpaul, Grete Oline Hole, Participation in Community Work: International Perspectives, Taylor & Francis, 2013. ISBN 9781135122966,
- Mark Henrickson, David Chipanta, Vincent J Lynch, Harnando Muñoz Sanchez, Vimla V. Nadkarni, Tetyana Semigina, Vishanthie Sewpaul, Getting to Zero: Global Social Work Responds to HIV, Massey University Press, 2017. ISBN 9780994141545
- "The global–local dialectic: Challenges for African scholarship and social work in a post-colonial world", British Journal of Social Work, Oxford University Press, 2006/4/1, Volume 36, Issue 3, Pages 419-434
